= EuroBrun ER189B =

1990 Formula 1 racing car

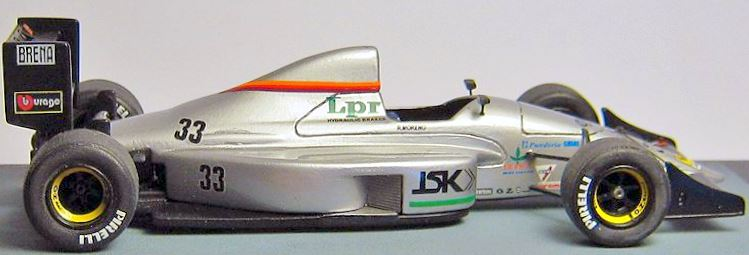
- 1:43 scale model of the EuroBrun ER189B
- Designers: George Ryton, Roberto Ori, Kees van der Grint
- Predecessor: EuroBrun ER189

Technical specifications
- Chassis: Molded Carbon fibers Monocoque
- Suspension (front): Spring/Fork/Triangle/Pushrod, Koni shock absorbers
- Suspension (rear): Spring/Fork/Triangle/Pushrod, Koni shock absorbers
- Axle track: Front track: 1,810 mm Rear track: 1,688 mm
- Wheelbase: 2,905 mm
- Engine: Judd CV V8 atmospheric 90° open Longitudinal engine
- Transmission: EuroBrun
- Weight: 500 kg
- Fuel: Agip
- Brakes: Brembo / SEP discs and calipers
- Tires: Pirelli

Competition history
- Notable entrants: EuroBrun
- Notable drivers: Roberto Moreno; Claudio Langes
- Debut: 1990 United States Grand Prix
Races	Wins	Poles	F/Laps
14	0	0	0

The EuroBrun ER189B is the last Formula 1 single-seater entered by the EuroBrun Racing team in its final participation in the Formula 1 World Championship, in 1990.

It made its championship debut at the U.S. Grand Prix, succeeding the EuroBrun ER189. This single-seater, designed by George Ryton, Roberto Ori and Kees van der Grint, was directly inspired by its predecessor from the 1989 season. Piloted by Brazilian driver Roberto Moreno and Italian Claudio Langes, it was entered fourteen times but only managed to qualify twice, at the start of the season in the hands of Roberto Moreno.

After the European season, Walter Brun, owner of EuroBrun Racing, announced that he wished to devote himself solely to his commitment to the World Sports Car Championship, and withdrew for the remainder of the season. Fined $400,000 for his two forfeits, EuroBrun left Formula 1 for good. The ER189B is therefore the team's last Formula 1 single-seater.

== Single-seater design ==
=== The ER190: the single-seater of renewal ===
EuroBrun Racing had a catastrophic year in 1989 in terms of sporting results, as the team was never able to pre-qualify or qualify for any Grand Prix, either with the EuroBrun ER188, a transitional single-seater, or with the EuroBrun ER189, its new single-seater designed by George Ryton. When the team's financial partners left the venture before the 1989 season was even over, and Giampaolo Pavanello, one of the team's co-founders, sold all his shares to Walter Brun, the Formula 1 microcosm expected Brun to give up Formula 1 and devote himself solely to the World Sports Car Championship.

However, surprisingly, in February 1990 the EuroBrun Racing team applied for two single-seaters for Roberto Moreno and Enrico Bertaggia for 1990. In addition, Walter Brun announced that he was in contact with the promoters of a new 12-cylinder V-engine, and that he planned to install this block in his single-seaters as early as the Italian Grand Prix.

During the off-season, Walter Brun bought out all the shares held by his partner Giampaolo Pavanello and signed an agreement with the Austrian developers of a new Neotech engine designed by Rolf-Peter Marlow, a former Porsche and BMW engineer. Weighing 137 kg, the Neotech was a 12-cylinder, 70° V engine with forty-eight valves, rated at 640 hp at 12,400 rpm. Some fifty million francs were needed to mass-produce this block, of which only three prototypes had been built. Brun was particularly interested in this engine, which could power both his Formula 1 single-seaters and his Group C cars.

Brun announced that he had found sponsors in the United Arab Emirates willing to invest a sum of 45 million Swiss francs in his team for the 1990 and 1991 seasons, which would enable him to finance an order for twenty Neotech engines.

In March 1990, the FIA published the list of entered drivers, and EuroBrun entered two single-seaters, powered by a Neotech engine but starting with the Judd V8 from the previous season.

=== Ambition downgraded with ER189B ===
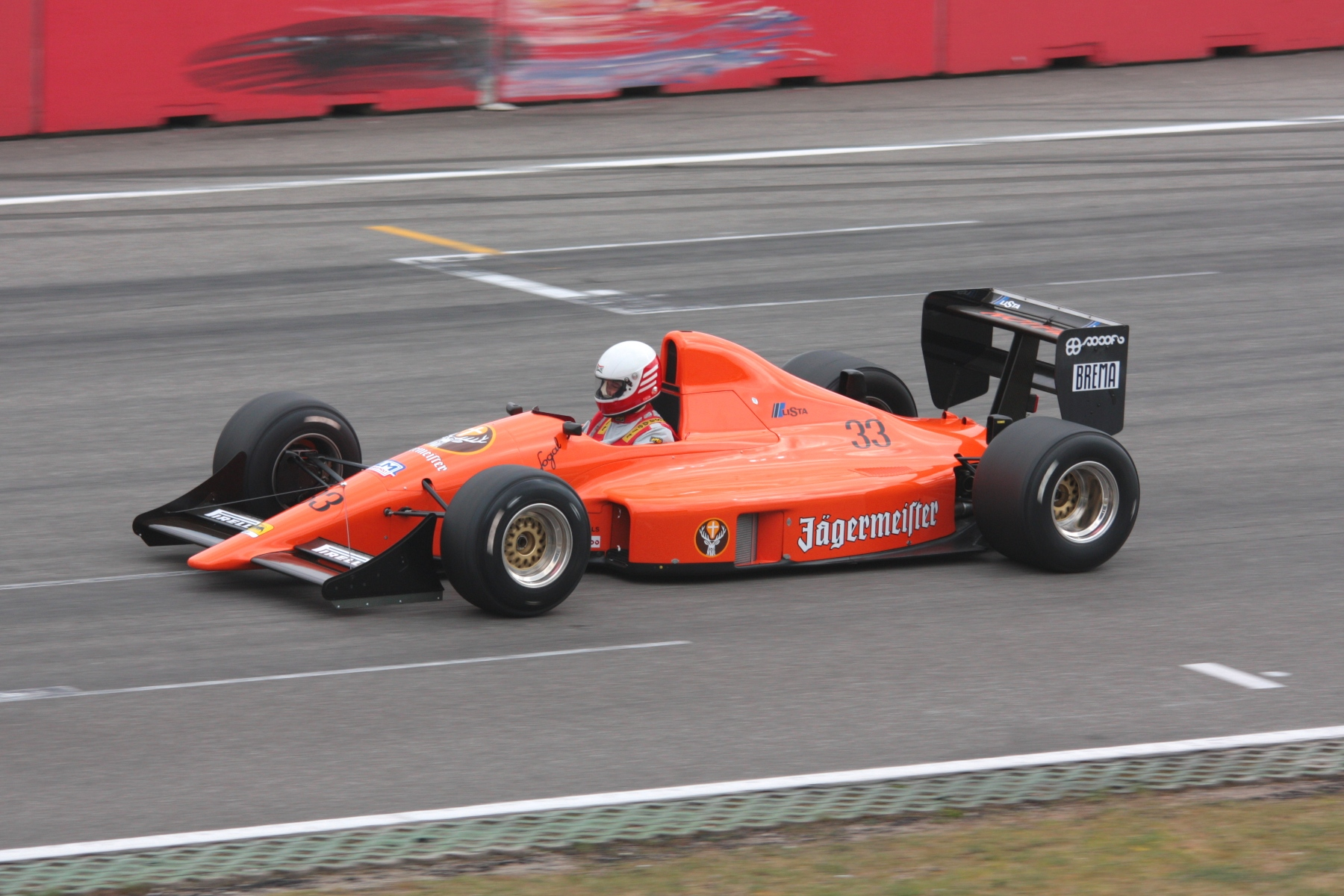
Due to a lack of financial resources, the EuroBrun ER189B was merely an evolution of the previous season's ER189.

George Ryton, a British automotive engineer known for his work as a designer of Formula 1 single-seaters at the Guildford Technical Office, Ferrari's technical arm headed by John Barnard, and recruited the previous year by Walter Brun, was commissioned to design the chassis for the new single-seater named EuroBrun ER190.

However, having only sketched the design of the future single-seater, Ryton left the new engineering office, Brun Technics, in Basingstoke, Hampshire (where Wiet Huidekopet and Tim Feast, behind the aborted Swiss Formula 1 team Ekström Racing, had also worked) to join the Tyrrell Racing team before finalizing the rear end, which would initially be fitted with a V8 engine, then a V12 block requiring new mounting points.

Roberto Ori, who had been assisting Ryton since the previous year, returned to the drawing board and, for lack of time, gave up developing the ER190 project and had to content himself with modifying the old ER189, which eventually became the ER189B. The main feature of the single-seater was the pushrod front suspension, with the front handsets transferred to the cowl, a solution directly inspired by the Ferrari 640 (John Barnard said at the time that the single-seater's design proved that George Ryton had left his job at Guildford Technical Office, the Ferrari technical branch he headed, taking aerodynamic studies with him). Ryton also drew inspiration from the McLaren MP4/5 for the shape of the hood.

Substituting for Ryton, Dutch engineer Kees van der Grint took over from Roberto Ori and did his best to lighten a chassis considered too heavy compared to the competition. For the start of the season, van der Grint modified the "in-house" gearbox to limit its bulk and worked on the rear suspension, a "monoshock" front suspension (suspension with a single spring-damper combination for both suspension arms) to be installed later.

== Driver selection ==
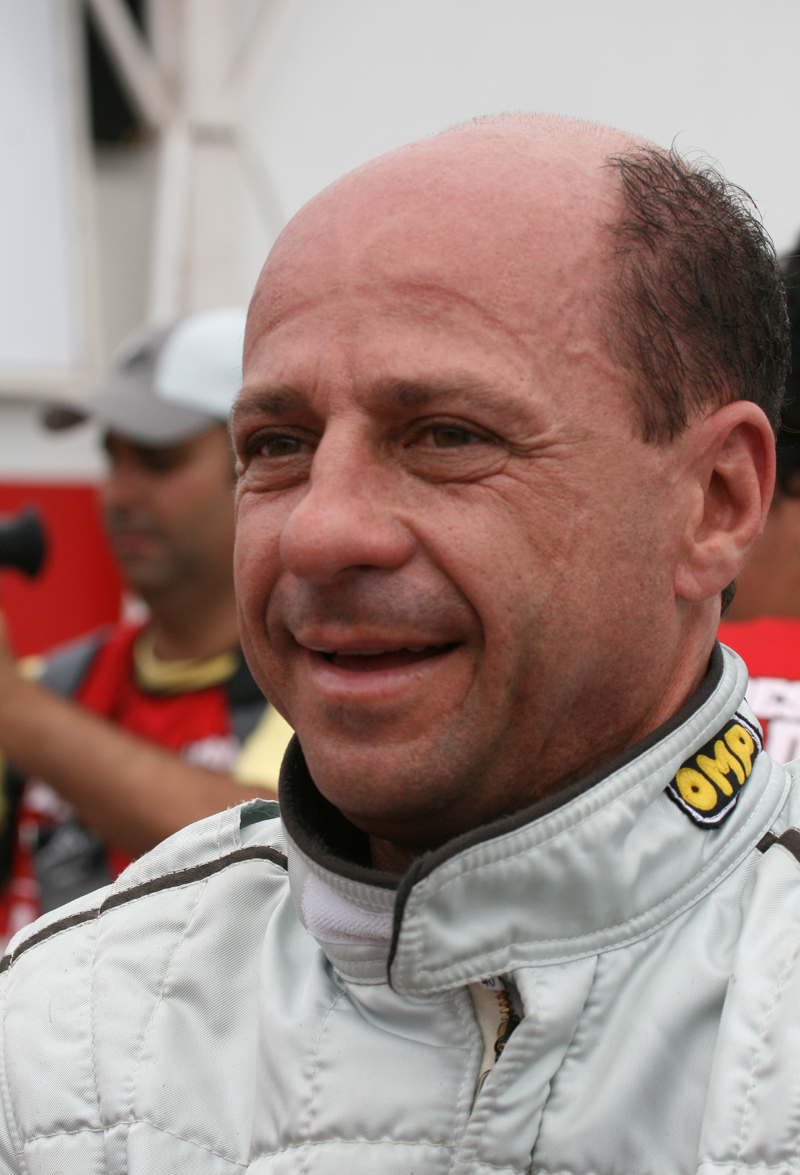
Roberto Moreno (pictured here in 2007), the team's only driver to qualify in 1990

In the previous season, Brun ran a single car teamed with pay-driver Gregor Foitek. Karl Foitek, who contributed part of the team's budget, despaired at not seeing his son at the start of a single race. Disillusioned by his team's lack of results, Gregor Foitek broke his contract mid-season and left the team just before the Italian Grand Prix, where his father looked for a drive in a team that did not have to go through pre-qualifying, and found him a position with Rial Racing, where he competed in the Spanish Grand Prix. Oscar Larrauri, who had already raced for EuroBrun in 1988, made a comeback at the end of the season, but was not retained at the end.

In February 1990, Brun announced that he had recruited Roberto Moreno and Enrico Bertaggia. Although Moreno was subsequently confirmed as first driver, Claudio Langes eventually replaced Enrico Bertaggia, who was short of funds and, after applying for a position as test driver with McLaren, went into exile to compete in the Japanese Formula 3000 championship.

Roberto Moreno made his Formula 1 debut in 1987 with AGS, where he started two Grands Prix. In 1989, with Coloni, a team at the back of the grid, he qualified four times but never made it to the finish line. Despite an impressive track record in the minor divisions (Brazilian karting champion in 1976, British Formula Ford champion in 1980, US Formula Atlantic vice-champion in 1983, European Formula 2 vice-champion in 1984, third in the International Formula 3000 Championship in 1987), the Brazilian struggled to make his mark in Formula 1. At the end of the 1989 season, he coveted a seat at Rial Racing, but as the team did not continue in Formula 1, he unsuccessfully approached Scuderia Minardi and Scuderia Italia before taking refuge at EuroBrun.

Claudio Langes was a driver with a considerably more modest record than his leader. In 1984, he finished fourth in the European Formula 3 Championship and, from 1985 to 1989, raced in Formula 3000, where his best world ranking was twelfth in the 1989 championship. Unknown to most team managers, he owed his place in Formula 1 only to his status as a paying driver: he brought in extra money to race, which was of particular interest to Walter Brun in his quest for cash.

== World Championship entry ==
=== An encouraging start to the season with the V8 engine ===
The ER189B makes its debut at the inaugural Grand Prix in Phoenix in a brand-new metallic-gray livery, the fifth in three years (after the original white, white and yellow, orange and black). With thirty-five drivers competing for twenty-seven qualifying places, both EuroBruns have to pass through pre-qualification and qualification stages. Pre-qualification is reserved for newly-entered teams and the lowest-ranked single-seaters from the previous season. The four fastest drivers in pre-qualification earn the right to take part in the qualifying tests. The three slowest drivers are eliminated, leaving just twenty-seven cars to start the race.

From the very first free practice sessions, Pirelli tires proved perfectly suited to the unusually cool temperatures in the city and the circuit's bumpy surface. Claudio Langes, however, failed to make the most of his Italian tires, setting the eighth fastest time of the nine drivers who had to pre-qualify. Roberto Moreno, on the other hand, set the fastest time in pre-qualifying with a time of 1 min 32 s 292, and progressed to the qualifying session. In the first qualifying session, he further improved his lap time, making him one of the provisionally qualified drivers. The rain then set in and Moreno, fearful of losing his provisional grid position, was one of twenty-one drivers to take part in the second free practice session to test his single-seater in the rain. He set the thirteenth fastest time and fine-tuned his set-up for the wet. Only fourteen drivers took part in the second qualifying session, which took place in the rain: the top-ranked drivers at the end of the first session had no fear of seeing their times beaten. Roberto Moreno achieved a minor feat by setting the second fastest time of the session, ahead of Alain Prost, Nigel Mansell, Jean Alesi, Riccardo Patrese and Ayrton Senna. He secured sixteenth place on the starting line, less than three seconds behind Gerhard Berger's pole position. For the first time in a year, a EuroBrun is allowed to start a Formula 1 Grand Prix.

Just after the start of the race, Moreno forgot to disconnect his electric fuel pump and had to make a quick pit stop on the second lap to change his flat battery. He had to make a second pit stop to change his tires and finally finished thirteenth in the race, five laps behind the winner Ayrton Senna. It was the first chequered flag for a EuroBrun in nineteen races.

=== The V12 engine will not power the ER189B ===
Behind the scenes, Walter Brun struggles to raise his budget to finance the Neotech engine, and the Austrian engine manufacturer announces that it plans to halt negotiations with EuroBrun and is looking for potential new partners. At the following Grand Prix in Brazil, Claudio Langes again missed out on pre-qualification, while Roberto Moreno broke down on the circuit with his engine cut. He borrowed his teammate's single-seater, but also failed to pre-qualify.

Shortly before the San Marino Grand Prix, when Rolf-Peter Marlow claimed to be able to supply EuroBrun with its first engine blocks, the Neotech project coordinator announces that Walter Brun has still not honored his financial commitments and is looking for a new partner to mass-produce the block. Walter Brun confirms Stappert's statement, announcing that he has been dropped by his contacts in the United Arab Emirates. He also declares that it is now highly likely that his single-seaters will remain powered by the Judd V8 block until the end of the season, and that the ER189B chassis will not evolve much during the year after Kees van der Grint has brought them into line with the new regulations.

At Imola, Claudio Langes failed to pre-qualify, unlike his team-mate. Moreno set the twenty-fourth fastest time in qualifying and was therefore eligible to start the race. In the race, Nigel Mansell went off into the grass on the outside of the first curve and Ivan Capelli braked, blinded by the dust raised by the Briton's single-seater. He was then hit by Satoru Nakajima, who destroyed his single-seater. When Roberto Moreno arrived at the scene of the accident, his throttle slides were immediately blocked by the dust and debris from the Japanese driver's single-seater: he retired before completing the first lap of the race.

=== One non-qualification led to another as the season progressed ===
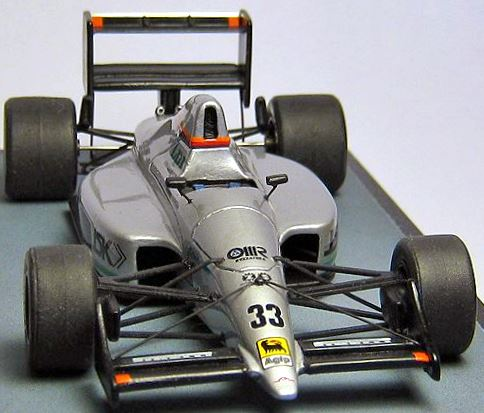
1:43 scale model of the EuroBrun ER189B

In Monaco, Claudio Langes still failed to pre-qualify, while his team-mate set the fourth fastest time of the session and progressed to the qualifying phase. During free practice on Saturday, when engineer Kees van der Grint had already left the circuit to return to the factory, the mechanics tested new suspension settings which did not prove satisfactory. They tried unsuccessfully to contact van der Grint to return to the original configuration, and Roberto Moreno, forced to take part in qualifying with a single-seater that had deteriorated, failed to qualify.

At the Canadian Grand Prix, the team's financial situation was at its worst: Claudio Langes no longer had the budget to race, and since the collapse of negotiations with partners in the Middle East, the team had become virtually dependent on the financial contributions of the Italian paying driver. It is now clear that, since the start of the season, Langes has been seen more as a providential financial provider than a real driver. Walter Brun, who had considered sacking him before the San Marino race, was forced to keep him on as he was unable to find another paying driver to replace him. In the absence of a budget, Langes was only authorized by his boss to complete two laps of the circuit in pre-qualifying: by giving him a symbolic run in this way, the team avoided a forfeit which would have cost them a $200,000 fine. Under such conditions, the Italian obviously missed his pre-qualification and had to quickly find new partners to continue the season. Meanwhile, Moreno perfectly adjusted his single-seater to the wet track and set the fastest time in pre-qualifying, lapping almost twenty seconds faster than his team-mate. However, during the qualifying session, which took place on a dry track, the engineers were unable to find the right settings, and the Brazilian missed out on qualifying by six hundredths of a second (1 min 25 s 172 compared with 1 min 25 s 113 for Alex Caffi on Arrows).

In Mexico, Langes had still not found a financial partner and, as at the previous Grand Prix, was only present to avoid his team having to pay the $200,000 fine. His three laps in pre-qualifying failed to earn him a place in qualifying. Moreno, for his part, set the third fastest time in pre-qualifying and progressed to qualifying. The first preparatory free practice session enabled him to improve his performance by almost five seconds, three seconds off the best time set by Nigel Mansell. In the first part of the qualifying session, he set the worst time of all the participants, and was therefore obliged to improve his performance in the second session. In the second preparatory free practice and in qualifying, he managed to raise his level of driving and set the provisional 24th fastest time, which enabled him to take the start. Shortly afterwards, however, he spun and stalled. As the marshals pushed his car off the track, he restarted his engine and took to the track again: he was then excluded from the Grand Prix for non-compliance with the rules, having benefited from “outside help". Later in the season, this rule, judged to be too severe, was revised to be applied only in races and not in qualifying.

In France, no EuroBrun took the start, as both drivers only set the sixth and seventh fastest times in pre-qualifying. For the next Grand Prix, at Silverstone, Walter Brun contacted Brazilian Formula 3000 driver Marco Greco with a view to taking over from Claudio Langes. At the last minute, however, Langes provided additional funding to enable him to continue with the team. However, no EuroBrun passed the pre-qualification hurdle.

In Germany, the team introduces the new “monochoc” front suspension on Claudio Langes' car, which serves as a test car for his teammate. This suspension features a single spring-damper unit for both suspension arms, reducing both size and weight. EuroBrun was one of the first teams to install such a system in Formula 1. Indeed, Tyrrell Racing has had the system since the previous year and has mastered its use perfectly, with AGS also testing the new system. Although tests were carried out the week before the event on the Hockenheim circuit, where the Grand Prix was held, the mechanics soon realized that the new suspension was not yet up to scratch, with Langes turning slower than his teammate. Although the team had an innovative solution that could give them a substantial advantage in pre-qualifying, the lack of financial resources meant that they were unable to take advantage of it: the Italian set the last pre-qualifying time in 1 min 50 s 897, and his team-mate, who suffered an off-track accident, the sixth in 1 min 48 s 983: neither car made it through to qualifying. What's more, Langes had to stop his pre-qualifying session when Moreno went off the track: the Brazilian having damaged his engine cover, Langes went back to the garage so that the mechanics could strip his car to repair his teammate's car.

As the season progressed, the team focused its technological efforts on just one of its two racing cars. The team had only three chassis at its disposal: the ER189B/01, an old ER189 chassis from the previous season reconfigured for Claudio Langes; the ER189B/02, a new chassis built in 1990 for Moreno's use; and the ER189B/03, the final chassis built in the spring for Moreno, who then freed up the ER189B/02 for Langes. Although Claudio Langes made it possible for the team to continue in Formula 1 with his financial contributions, he never benefited from the best single-seater the team had ever entered, and it was always on his car that the team tested the riskiest solutions, so as not to penalize Roberto Moreno. What's more, his single-seater is often used as a replacement car for the Brazilian, and increasingly as a spare parts bank.

In Hungary, due to a lack of development, no EuroBrun pre-qualified. From the Belgian Grand Prix onwards, following the withdrawal of the two Onyx single-seaters despite Monteverdi's purchase of the team due to bankruptcy, although only three cars were eliminated in pre-qualifying instead of five, the AGS and Coloni cars consistently took the lead over the EuroBruns.

In Belgium, Italy, Portugal, and Spain, the EuroBrun vehicles placed ahead of Bruno Giacomelli’s Life Racing Engines, a car that has frequently held the final position on the grid during the season.

== Retirement from Formula 1 before the end of the season ==
At the end of the European season, Walter Brun informs his drivers that he now wishes to devote his attention solely to entering his three cars in the World Sports Car Championship, and that he will forego the costly trips to Japan and Australia. FIA Vice-President Bernie Ecclestone confirms a $200,000 fine for each forfeit until the end of the season. Ecclestone also announced that any team failing to pay its forfeit fines would automatically be refused entry for the 1991 season. EuroBrun thus left Formula 1 for good.

== Non-World Championship entry ==
On 8 and 9 December 1990 the ER189B took part in the Trofeo Indoor di Formula 1, an exhibition event organized in conjunction with the Bologna Motor Show, an international exhibition recognized by the International Organization of Motor Vehicle Manufacturers and held in the halls of the Bologna Fair. Although the event is called indoor, the 1,300-meter-long track is located outside the show premises. Only Italian teams took part in the third edition of this “competition-show”, which enabled them to present themselves to their national public and was a way for team managers to establish contacts with potential financial partners to supplement their budget for the coming season.

Scuderia Minardi entered an M190 single-seater driven by Italian Gianni Morbidelli. Osella entrusts an FA1M-E to its incumbent Olivier Grouillard. Scuderia Italia fields its regular Jyrki Järvilehto in a Dallara 190. Coloni signs newcomer Pedro Chaves and Paolo Coloni, son of Italian team owner Enzo Coloni, on the FC189C. EuroBrun calls on two drivers who have never driven in Formula 1, Andrea Montermini and Domenico Schiattarella.

The competition comprised three rounds. While Andrea Montermini did not take part in the event, Domenico Schiattarella, up against Gianni Morbidelli, was forced to retire after the first lap due to a suspension problem.

== Complete Formula One World Championship results ==
(key)

Year	Entrant	Engines	Tyres	Drivers	Grands Prix																Points	WCC
Year	Entrant	Engines	Tyres	Drivers	USA	BRA	SMR	MON	CAN	MEX	FRA	GBR	GER	HUN	BEL	ITA	POR	ESP	JPN	AUS	Points	WCC
1990	EuroBrun Racing	Judd CV V8	P	(Brazil) Roberto Moreno	13	DNPQ	Ret	DNQ	DNQ	EX	DNPQ	DNPQ	DNPQ	DNPQ	DNPQ	DNPQ	DNPQ	DNPQ			0	NC
1990	EuroBrun Racing	Judd CV V8	P	(Italy) Claudio Langes	DNPQ	DNPQ	DNPQ	DNPQ	DNPQ	DNPQ	DNPQ	DNPQ	DNPQ	DNPQ	DNPQ	DNPQ	DNPQ	DNPQ			0	NC
