= 1989 United States Grand Prix =

Coordinates: 33°26′52.5″N 112°4′28.5″W

- Race 5 of 16 in the 1989 Formula One World Championship

Race details
- Date: June 4, 1989
- Official name: XXVI Iceberg United States Grand Prix
- Location: Phoenix Street Circuit; Phoenix, Arizona
- Course: Temporary street circuit
- Course length: 3.800 km (2.361 miles)
- Distance: 75 laps, 285.00 km (177.075 miles)
- Weather: Hot, sunny; temperature up to maximum of 38.3 °C (100.9 °F)
- Attendance: 31,441

Pole position
| Driver | (Brazil) Ayrton Senna | McLaren-Honda |
- Time: 1:30.108

Fastest lap
| Driver | (Brazil) Ayrton Senna | McLaren-Honda |
- Time: 1:33.969 on lap 38

Podium
| First | (France) Alain Prost | McLaren-Honda |
| Second | (Italy) Riccardo Patrese | Williams-Renault |
| Third | (United States) Eddie Cheever | Arrows-Ford |

The 1989 United States Grand Prix was a Formula One motor race held in Phoenix, Arizona on June 4, 1989. It was the fifth race of the 1989 Formula One World Championship and the first United States Grand Prix to be held in Phoenix.

== Background ==
In October 1988, officials in the city of Detroit, Michigan, refused to invest more money to bring the Detroit Street Circuit up to new Formula 1 regulations, and an attempt to move the circuit to a new circuit on Belle Isle, an island in the Detroit River, failed (although there was success for IndyCar's move to Belle Isle for 1992). This resulted in the cancellation of the Detroit Grand Prix for the 1989 season. City officials in Phoenix, Arizona, were interested in hosting a major sporting event to promote their city, and with Bernie Ecclestone desperate to retain a US race in the Formula 1 calendar, on January 13, 1989 the Phoenix City Council approved a five-year contract to promote and run the race. Because of the relatively short notice, the first race was scheduled for June 4, despite the weather in Phoenix typically being extremely hot in June.

On the Thursday before qualifying, Formula Atlantic, the support category for the weekend, had the first practice session on the new track before the Formula One cars hit the circuit for pre-qualifying at 8 o'clock on Friday morning. The Formula Atlantic session caused a couple of problems: a manhole cover was lifted, and the track surface at turn 9 at the end of the back straight (Washington Street) had begun to break up in the same way Detroit and Dallas had done in the past. Overnight, quick-dry cement was used to patch up the broken surface and while dusty and bumpy, the cement held for the remainder of the weekend.

== Qualifying ==
=== Pre-qualifying report ===
A Brabham topped the pre-qualifying session time sheets for the fifth time this season as Martin Brundle was fastest. It was the same four pre-qualifiers as at the last event in Mexico, albeit in a different order, as Alex Caffi took second in the Dallara, Stefan Johansson was third in the Onyx, and Brundle's Brabham team-mate Stefano Modena was fourth.

Those to miss out included Piercarlo Ghinzani, who was fifth in his Osella, and sixth-fastest Pierre-Henri Raphanel in the Coloni. Seventh was Gregor Foitek in the EuroBrun, ahead of the second Osella of Nicola Larini. In a better showing than in previous races, Joachim Winkelhock was ninth in his AGS, followed by Volker Weidler in the Rial. Then came the two Zakspeeds of Bernd Schneider and Aguri Suzuki, with Bertrand Gachot slowest in the other Onyx, after a CV joint failed on his car, and the spare car would not start.

=== Pre-qualifying classification ===
| Pos | No | Driver | Constructor | Time | Gap |
|---|---|---|---|---|---|
| 1 | 7 | (United Kingdom) Martin Brundle | Brabham-Judd | 1:32.293 | — |
| 2 | 21 | (Italy) Alex Caffi | Dallara-Ford | 1:32.992 | +0.699 |
| 3 | 36 | (Sweden) Stefan Johansson | Onyx-Ford | 1:33.768 | +1.475 |
| 4 | 8 | (Italy) Stefano Modena | Brabham-Judd | 1:33.924 | +1.631 |
| 5 | 18 | (Italy) Piercarlo Ghinzani | Osella-Ford | 1:34.281 | +1.988 |
| 6 | 32 | (France) Pierre-Henri Raphanel | Coloni-Ford | 1.35.110 | +2.817 |
| 7 | 33 | (Switzerland) Gregor Foitek | Euro Brun-Judd | 1:35.805 | +3.512 |
| 8 | 17 | (Italy) Nicola Larini | Osella-Ford | 1:36.470 | +4.177 |
| 9 | 41 | (West Germany) Joachim Winkelhock | AGS-Ford | 1:36.498 | +4.205 |
| 10 | 39 | (West Germany) Volker Weidler | Rial-Ford | 1:36.583 | +4.290 |
| 11 | 34 | (West Germany) Bernd Schneider | Zakspeed-Yamaha | 1:36.610 | +4.317 |
| 12 | 35 | (Japan) Aguri Suzuki | Zakspeed-Yamaha | 1:37.776 | +5.483 |
| 13 | 37 | (Belgium) Bertrand Gachot | Onyx-Ford | 1:45.530 | +13.237 |

=== Qualifying report ===
In qualifying on Friday, Ayrton Senna went progressively faster and faster, eventually posting a time 1.5 seconds ahead of McLaren teammate Alain Prost and the rest of the field. Senna's Friday time of 1:30.710 stood up through the second session and gave him his 34th career pole position, breaking Jim Clark's record of 33 which he had equalled in the previous race in Mexico.

During the morning practice on Saturday, Prost spun backward into a wall and damaged the monocoque and gearbox. It was the first monocoque Prost had broken since returning to the team in 1984. Prost then had to take Senna's spare car for the race.

The only American driver in the field, Phoenix native Eddie Cheever, qualified his Arrows-Ford in 17th place, some 3.1 seconds slower than pole man Senna.

=== Qualifying classification ===
| Pos | No | Driver | Constructor | Q1 | Q2 | Gap |
|---|---|---|---|---|---|---|
| 1 | 1 | (Brazil) Ayrton Senna | McLaren-Honda | 1:30.108 | 1:30.710 | — |
| 2 | 2 | (France) Alain Prost | McLaren-Honda | 1:31.620 | 1:31.517 | +1.409 |
| 3 | 19 | (Italy) Alessandro Nannini | Benetton-Ford | 1:32.924 | 1:31.799 | +1.691 |
| 4 | 27 | (United Kingdom) Nigel Mansell | Ferrari | 1:31.927 | 1:33.383 | +1.819 |
| 5 | 7 | (United Kingdom) Martin Brundle | Brabham-Judd | 1:32.750 | 1:31.960 | +1.852 |
| 6 | 21 | (Italy) Alex Caffi | Dallara-Ford | 1:32.819 | 1:32.160 | +2.052 |
| 7 | 8 | (Italy) Stefano Modena | Brabham-Judd | 1:34.267 | 1:32.286 | +2.178 |
| 8 | 28 | (Austria) Gerhard Berger | Ferrari | 1:33.697 | 1:32.364 | +2.256 |
| 9 | 4 | (Italy) Michele Alboreto | Tyrrell-Ford | 1:33.377 | 1:32.491 | +2.383 |
| 10 | 9 | (United Kingdom) Derek Warwick | Arrows-Ford | 1:32.640 | 1:32.492 | +2.384 |
| 11 | 16 | (Italy) Ivan Capelli | March-Judd | 1:36.136 | 1:32.493 | +2.385 |
| 12 | 30 | (France) Philippe Alliot | Lola-Lamborghini | 1:34.721 | 1:32.562 | +2.454 |
| 13 | 22 | (Italy) Andrea de Cesaris | Dallara-Ford | 1:33.061 | 1:32.649 | +2.541 |
| 14 | 6 | (Italy) Riccardo Patrese | Williams-Renault | 1:34.523 | 1:32.795 | +2.687 |
| 15 | 23 | (Italy) Pierluigi Martini | Minardi-Ford | 1:34.794 | 1:33.031 | +2.923 |
| 16 | 5 | (Belgium) Thierry Boutsen | Williams-Renault | 1:35.227 | 1:33.044 | +2.936 |
| 17 | 10 | (United States) Eddie Cheever | Arrows-Ford | 1:33.214 | 1:33.361 | +3.106 |
| 18 | 15 | (Brazil) Maurício Gugelmin | March-Judd | 1:35.236 | 1:33.324 | +3.216 |
| 19 | 36 | (Sweden) Stefan Johansson | Onyx-Ford | 1:34.637 | 1:33.370 | +3.262 |
| 20 | 24 | (Spain) Luis Pérez-Sala | Minardi-Ford | 1:34.636 | 1:33.724 | +3.616 |
| 21 | 3 | (United Kingdom) Jonathan Palmer | Tyrrell-Ford | 1:34.748 | 1:33.741 | +3.633 |
| 22 | 11 | (Brazil) Nelson Piquet | Lotus-Judd | 1:33.745 | 1:33.804 | +3.637 |
| 23 | 12 | (Japan) Satoru Nakajima | Lotus-Judd | 1:35.188 | 1:33.782 | +3.674 |
| 24 | 40 | (Italy) Gabriele Tarquini | AGS-Ford | 1:34.455 | 1:33.790 | +3.682 |
| 25 | 20 | (United Kingdom) Johnny Herbert | Benetton-Ford | 1:35.377 | 1:33.806 | +3.698 |
| 26 | 38 | (West Germany) Christian Danner | Rial-Ford | 1:35.453 | 1:33.848 | +3.740 |
| 27 | 26 | (France) Olivier Grouillard | Ligier-Ford | 1:35.124 | 1:34.153 | +4.045 |
| 28 | 31 | (Brazil) Roberto Moreno | Coloni-Ford | 2:10.795 | 1:34.352 | +4.244 |
| 29 | 25 | (France) René Arnoux | Ligier-Ford | 1:35.823 | 1:34.798 | +4.715 |
| 30 | 29 | (France) Yannick Dalmas | Lola-Lamborghini | 1:35.771 | 1:35.496 | +5.388 |

== Race ==
=== Race report ===
Alessandro Nannini crashed his Benetton heavily in the morning warm-up session and was forced to start the race not only in the spare car but also wearing a neck brace due to a very sore neck.

Prost got a jump on Senna at the start, but hit a bump in the straight, causing his wheels to spin and the engine to be cut momentarily by the rev limiter allowing Senna to pull ahead, but by the end of the first lap his lead was only 0.45 seconds. Nannini ran third followed by Nigel Mansell, Alex Caffi, Stefano Modena, Martin Brundle, Gerhard Berger, Andrea de Cesaris and Michele Alboreto. Nannini's neck could only take 10 laps of racing before he pulled into the pits to retire. He had been third until a spin on lap four dropped him to eighth and retired after not being able to hold his head up properly and complaining of dizziness. After 16 laps, Senna's lead over Prost was 4.25 seconds. He suddenly doubled that on the next lap when Prost's engine began overheating, forcing the Frenchman to back off for a few laps in a bid to get the water and oil temperatures back to normal. Despite Senna's seemingly commanding position, Prost remained confident of winning as he had seen that his McLaren was handling better than his teammate's. He reasoned that later in the race his only problem would be getting past. Maurício Gugelmin was black flagged for adding brake fluid in contravention of the regulations.

The gap between the two McLarens varied as they worked their way through traffic, but on lap 29, Prost closed the gap when Senna suffered a misfire. The problem disappeared momentarily, with Senna doing his fastest lap of the race, but then returned, worse than before. Nigel Mansell would soon retire for the 4th time out of 5 races by lap 32 with the result of an alternator failure. On lap 34, with Prost only one second back, Senna waved his teammate past as they went down the back straight and then pitted at the end of the lap.

The Honda engine's electronic fuel injection system was acting up and after two pit stops to change the black box, battery and plugs, and with successive fastest laps in between, Senna retired on lap 44 with electrical problems (notably his 1st retirement of the season). Since joining McLaren at the start of 1988 it was his first ever retirement because of a Honda engine failure and the first failure of their V10 engine under race conditions. It was also only the second time in 21 races with McLaren that a Honda engine had failed, the first being when Prost's V6 turbo had blown up halfway through the 1988 Italian Grand Prix, the only race of the 1988 season that McLaren did not win.

Alex Caffi, who had started in sixth in his Pirelli shod Dallara-Ford, was up to second with Senna's retirement. A stop for new tires, after being passed by Berger (whose palms were still raw and sore from his Imola crash only six weeks before), dropped him back two more spots to fifth. As he tried to re-lap his teammate de Cesaris, however, de Cesaris turned in, forcing Caffi into the wall and out of the race. After the race de Cesaris said that he simply did not see Caffi and did not even know about putting him into the wall until after the race. De Cesaris continued on to an 8th-place finish. Berger's Ferrari suffered alternator failure (meaning no power to the revolutionary semi-automatic transmission) 9 laps after Caffi's retirement. Reporters tried to interview Berger but his mechanic closed the garage door; just before the garage door closed ESPN pit reporter John Bisignano saw Berger being splashed with water.

Throughout the race, Riccardo Patrese, Ivan Capelli and Eddie Cheever had been in close contact. When Capelli retired on lap 21 with a gearbox failure, Patrese and Cheever carried on the battle alone. After lap 51, the fight was for second place, with Patrese ahead. Despite a fuel pickup problem with his engine, Cheever mounted a challenge in the closing laps until his front brakes and one rear brake failed. He finished in third place.

Stefan Johansson had managed to drag the Onyx not only through pre-qualifying but also onto the grid and drove a steady race to be running in 7th place just outside the points before having to retire on lap 50 with suspension damage from a previous puncture.

As was predicted, the two-hour time limit was reached after 75 of the scheduled 81 laps, and Prost coasted to his only United States win (after not having won at Watkins Glen, Long Beach, Las Vegas, Detroit or Dallas), and increased his then all-time record victory total to 36 and his first win in a naturally aspirated car (his only other season in F1 without turbo power had been his rookie season with McLaren in 1980 when the team used the Cosworth DFV V8 engine). He also took the lead, by two points over Senna, in the Driver's Championship, which he eventually won. Patrese's runner-up placing was his second in a row. After struggling through practice, qualifying and warm up, and starting from 14th spot, Patrese and technical director Patrick Head had guessed at a setup and finally got it right for the race. Eddie Cheever's third place was the ninth and last podium finish of his F1 career. Christian Danner benefited from retirements ahead of him to take fourth place for Rial. It was his best career finish and matched the best ever finish for the team.

=== Post-race ===
Before the race there was a push to reduce the number of race laps from 81 to 70, due to the expected hot weather and after practice times had revealed the race would likely hit the two hour mark well before the scheduled number of laps had been reached. With the track slightly longer than the Adelaide Street Circuit used for the Australian Grand Prix (measuring 3800 metres, against 3780 metres of the Australian track), the prediction was that lap times would be around the 1:15 to 1:20 mark; however, qualifying times were around 15 seconds slower than this. Ken Tyrrell was the only team boss who refused to sign the document which would have allowed the race length to be reduced. In the race, Jonathan Palmer lost a certain 4th place when his Tyrrell 018 ran out of fuel on lap 69. Had the race been flagged after 70 laps, Palmer would have finished 4th having already been lapped by Prost instead of running out of fuel and being classified as 9th and last.

The organizers were slightly disappointed with a crowd of 31,441 turning out for the race on Sunday in 100 degrees Fahrenheit (38 °C) heat, having hoped for 40,000.

=== Race classification ===
| Pos | No | Driver | Constructor | Laps | Time/retired | Grid | Points |
|---|---|---|---|---|---|---|---|
| 1 | 2 | (France) Alain Prost | McLaren-Honda | 75 | 2:01:33.133 | 2 | 9 |
| 2 | 6 | (Italy) Riccardo Patrese | Williams-Renault | 75 | + 39.696 | 14 | 6 |
| 3 | 10 | (United States) Eddie Cheever | Arrows-Ford | 75 | + 43.210 | 17 | 4 |
| 4 | 38 | (West Germany) Christian Danner | Rial-Ford | 74 | + 1 lap | 26 | 3 |
| 5 | 20 | (United Kingdom) Johnny Herbert | Benetton-Ford | 74 | + 1 lap | 25 | 2 |
| 6 | 5 | (Belgium) Thierry Boutsen | Williams-Renault | 74 | + 1 lap | 16 | 1 |
| 7 | 40 | (Italy) Gabriele Tarquini | AGS-Ford | 73 | Engine | 24 | |
| 8 | 22 | (Italy) Andrea de Cesaris | Dallara-Ford | 70 | Out of fuel | 13 | |
| 9 | 3 | (United Kingdom) Jonathan Palmer | Tyrrell-Ford | 69 | Out of fuel | 21 | |
| Ret | 28 | (Austria) Gerhard Berger | Ferrari | 61 | Alternator | 8 | |
| Ret | 21 | (Italy) Alex Caffi | Dallara-Ford | 52 | Collision | 6 | |
| Ret | 11 | (Brazil) Nelson Piquet | Lotus-Judd | 52 | Spun off | 22 | |
| Ret | 36 | (Sweden) Stefan Johansson | Onyx-Ford | 50 | Suspension | 19 | |
| Ret | 24 | (Spain) Luis Pérez-Sala | Minardi-Ford | 46 | Engine | 20 | |
| Ret | 1 | (Brazil) Ayrton Senna | McLaren-Honda | 44 | Electrical | 1 | |
| Ret | 7 | (United Kingdom) Martin Brundle | Brabham-Judd | 43 | Brakes | 5 | |
| Ret | 8 | (Italy) Stefano Modena | Brabham-Judd | 37 | Brakes | 7 | |
| Ret | 27 | (United Kingdom) Nigel Mansell | Ferrari | 31 | Alternator | 4 | |
| Ret | 23 | (Italy) Pierluigi Martini | Minardi-Ford | 26 | Engine | 15 | |
| Ret | 12 | (Japan) Satoru Nakajima | Lotus-Judd | 24 | Throttle | 23 | |
| Ret | 16 | (Italy) Ivan Capelli | March-Judd | 22 | Transmission | 11 | |
| DSQ | 15 | (Brazil) Maurício Gugelmin | March-Judd | 20 | Additional brake fluid | 18 | |
| Ret | 4 | (Italy) Michele Alboreto | Tyrrell-Ford | 17 | Gearbox | 9 | |
| Ret | 19 | (Italy) Alessandro Nannini | Benetton-Ford | 10 | Physical | 3 | |
| Ret | 9 | (United Kingdom) Derek Warwick | Arrows-Ford | 7 | Collision | 10 | |
| Ret | 30 | (France) Philippe Alliot | Lola-Lamborghini | 3 | Spun off | 12 | |
| DNQ | 26 | (France) Olivier Grouillard | Ligier-Ford | | | | |
| DNQ | 31 | (Brazil) Roberto Moreno | Coloni-Ford | | | | |
| DNQ | 25 | (France) René Arnoux | Ligier-Ford | | | | |
| DNQ | 29 | (France) Yannick Dalmas | Lola-Lamborghini | | | | |
| DNPQ | 18 | (Italy) Piercarlo Ghinzani | Osella-Ford | | | | |
| DNPQ | 32 | (France) Pierre-Henri Raphanel | Coloni-Ford | | | | |
| DNPQ | 33 | (Switzerland) Gregor Foitek | Euro Brun-Judd | | | | |
| DNPQ | 17 | (Italy) Nicola Larini | Osella-Ford | | | | |
| DNPQ | 41 | (West Germany) Joachim Winkelhock | AGS-Ford | | | | |
| DNPQ | 39 | (West Germany) Volker Weidler | Rial-Ford | | | | |
| DNPQ | 34 | (West Germany) Bernd Schneider | Zakspeed-Yamaha | | | | |
| DNPQ | 35 | (Japan) Aguri Suzuki | Zakspeed-Yamaha | | | | |
| DNPQ | 37 | (Belgium) Bertrand Gachot | Onyx-Ford | | | | |

== Championship standings after the race ==
Drivers' Championship standings

| Pos | Driver | Points |
|---|---|---|
| 1 | (France) Alain Prost | 29 |
| 2 | (Brazil) Ayrton Senna | 27 |
| 3 | (Italy) Riccardo Patrese | 12 |
| 4 | (United Kingdom) Nigel Mansell | 9 |
| 5 | (Italy) Alessandro Nannini | 8 |

Constructors' Championship standings

| Pos | Constructor | Points |
|---|---|---|
| 1 | (United Kingdom) McLaren-Honda | 56 |
| 2 | (United Kingdom) Williams-Renault | 16 |
| 3 | (United Kingdom) Benetton-Ford | 13 |
| 4 | (Italy) Ferrari | 9 |
| 5 | (United Kingdom) Arrows-Ford | 8 |

- Note: Only the top five positions are included for both sets of standings.

| Previous race: 1989 Mexican Grand Prix | FIA Formula One World Championship; 1989 season | Next race: 1989 Canadian Grand Prix |
| Previous race: 1980 United States Grand Prix | United States Grand Prix | Next race: 1990 United States Grand Prix |
