= EuroBrun =

Formula One constructor

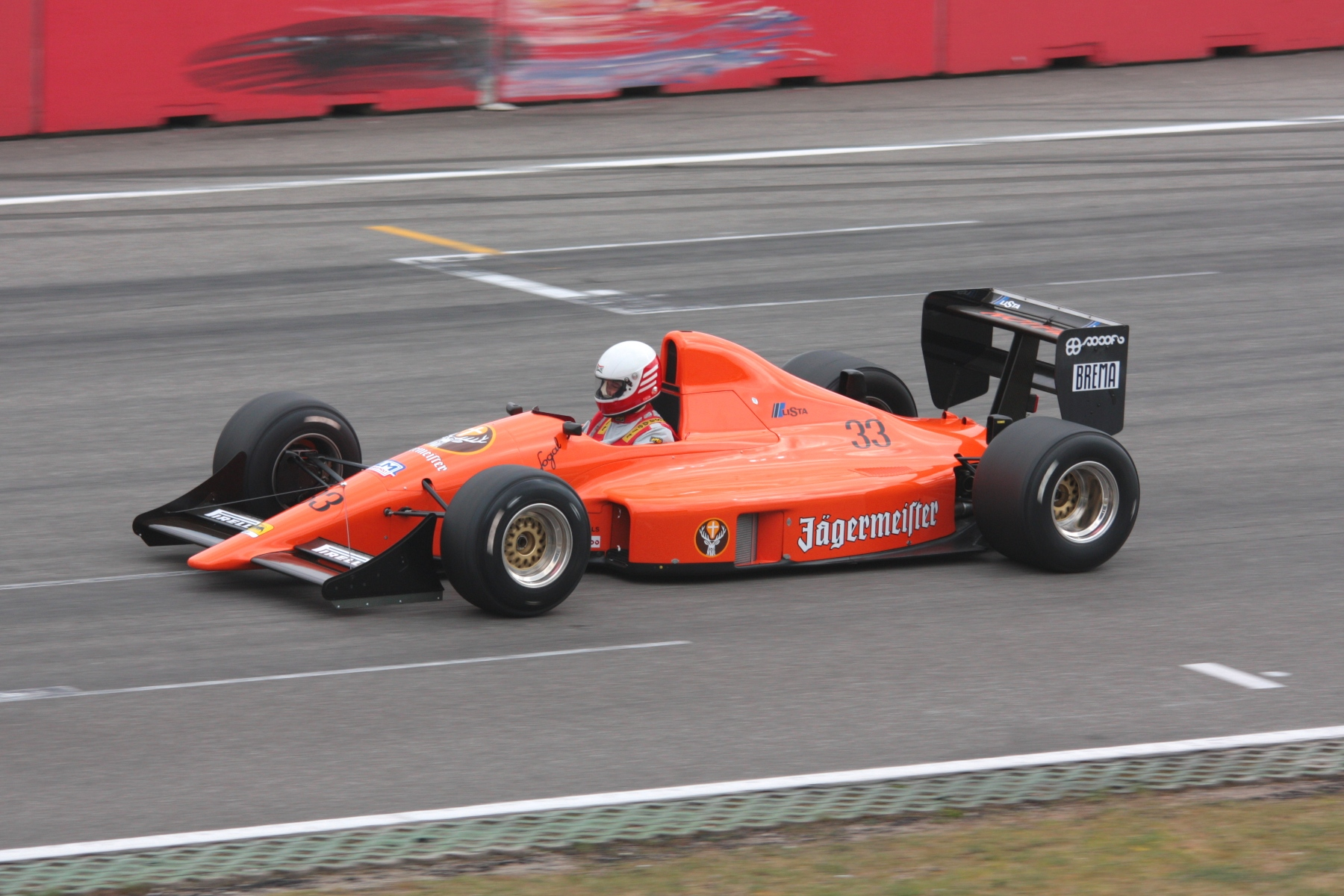
- Full name: EuroBrun Racing
- Base: Senago, Milan, Italy
- Noted staff: Walter Brun; Giampaolo Pavanello
- Noted drivers: (Italy) Stefano Modena (Argentina) Oscar Larrauri (Brazil) Roberto Moreno (Switzerland) Gregor Foitek

Formula One World Championship career
- First entry: 1988 Brazilian Grand Prix
- Races entered: 46 (20 starts)
- Engines: Ford; Judd
- Constructors' Championships: 0
- Drivers' Championships: 0
- Race victories: 0 (best finish: 11th, 1988 Hungarian Grand Prix)
- Pole positions: 0 (best grid position: 15th, 1988 Canadian Grand Prix)
- Fastest laps: 0
- Final entry: 1990 Spanish Grand Prix

EuroBrun Racing was a Swiss-Italian Formula One constructor based in Senago, Milan, Italy. They participated in 46 Grands Prix between 1988 and 1990, with an Italian license, entering a total of 76 cars.

== Background ==
The team was a combination of two outfits – the mechanical manpower and skill of Giampaolo Pavanello's Euroracing team, who had also run the factory-backed Alfa Romeo Formula One team from 1982–85, and the financial muscle and organisational skill of Swiss slot machine magnate and former touring car driver Walter Brun, who owned and ran the Brun Motorsport sports car team.

== 1988 ==
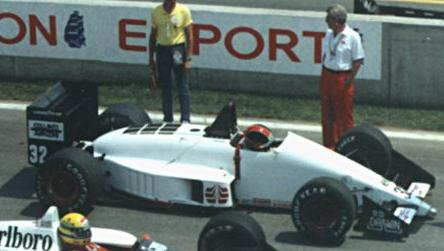
Oscar Larrauri driving for EuroBrun at the 1988 Canadian Grand Prix.

For the team's debut season in 1988, Mario Tolentino designed the ER188 chassis, to be powered by a normally-aspirated 3.5-litre Cosworth DFZ engine. 1987 Formula 3000 champion Stefano Modena and long-time Brun sportscar stalwart Oscar Larrauri were signed to drive. Despite a solid if unspectacular start to the season, EuroBrun were soon struggling as money ran low. There was internal trouble when Brun unsuccessfully tried to replace Larrauri with Christian Danner (the Argentine driver had gained the unwanted reputation among his fellow drivers of being a 'mobile chicane' in both qualifying and races) and Euroracing were showing disinterest in Formula One. Both drivers failed to qualify at certain events (Modena missing out four times and being excluded from another two races for technical infringements, and Larrauri failing seven times). Modena's 11th place at the Hungarian Grand Prix was the team's best result of the year.

== 1989 ==
Before the 1989 season, Euroracing slimmed down to a nominal level of involvement, in the shape of a handful of engineers and mechanics. EuroBrun scaled back to a single car (being the only team to enter one car that year, as opposed to two) to be driven by Swiss driver Gregor Foitek, while the ER188 was modified slightly to take a Judd V8 engine and Pirelli tyres. The team would only make it through pre-qualifying once, in the opening race of the season in Brazil, and then Foitek failed to qualify. Even the introduction of George Ryton's new ER189 for the German Grand Prix did not help. Foitek quit after the Belgian Grand Prix, to be replaced by the returning Larrauri, who was no more successful.

== 1990 ==
Despite failing to start a single race in 1989, the team returned in 1990 with two cars once again. Euroracing had now left the partnership altogether and the team started the season with an upgraded version of the ER189 known as the ER189B. Roberto Moreno led the team, with Claudio Langes in the second car. Langes would not make it through pre-qualifying once. A freak qualifying session at the opening race of the season in the United States saw Moreno start 16th on the grid and he eventually finished 13th. The capable Brazilian qualified again in San Marino and came close on other occasions, but as Brun lost enthusiasm, the EuroBruns fell further and further away from the grid. After 14 rounds the team withdrew from the Formula One Championship, having made only 20 starts from 76 entries. In 2021, Moreno claimed that the team purposely did not want to qualify for races so as not to spend funds they did not have on extra tyres and engine rebuilds, stating that the team gave him race-marked tyres to qualify on and the Judd engines went as long as four events without rebuilds.

== Complete Formula One results ==
(key)

Year	Chassis	Engines	Tyres	No.	Drivers	1	2	3	4	5	6	7	8	9	10	11	12	13	14	15	16	Points	WCC
1988	ER188	Ford Cosworth DFZ 3.5 V8	G			BRA	SMR	MON	MEX	CAN	DET	FRA	GBR	GER	HUN	BEL	ITA	POR	ESP	JPN	AUS	0	NC
1988	ER188	Ford Cosworth DFZ 3.5 V8	G	32	(Argentina) Oscar Larrauri	DNS	DNQ	Ret	13	Ret	Ret	Ret	DNQ	16	DNQ	DNPQ	DNPQ	DNPQ	DNQ	DNQ	Ret	0	NC
1988	ER188	Ford Cosworth DFZ 3.5 V8	G	33	(Italy) Stefano Modena	Ret	NC	EX	EX	12	Ret	14	12	Ret	11	DNQ	DNQ	DNQ	13	DNQ	Ret	0	NC
1989	ER188B; ER189	Judd CV 3.5 V8	P			BRA	SMR	MON	MEX	USA	CAN	FRA	GBR	GER	HUN	BEL	ITA	POR	ESP	JPN	AUS	0	NC
1989	ER188B; ER189	Judd CV 3.5 V8	P	33	(Switzerland) Gregor Foitek	DNQ	DNPQ	DNPQ	DNPQ	DNPQ	DNPQ	DNPQ	DNPQ	DNPQ	DNPQ	DNPQ						0	NC
1989	ER188B; ER189	Judd CV 3.5 V8	P	33	(Argentina) Oscar Larrauri												DNPQ	DNPQ	DNPQ	DNPQ	DNPQ	0	NC
1990	ER189B	Judd CV 3.5 V8	P			USA	BRA	SMR	MON	CAN	MEX	FRA	GBR	GER	HUN	BEL	ITA	POR	ESP	JPN	AUS	0	NC
1990	ER189B	Judd CV 3.5 V8	P	33	(Brazil) Roberto Moreno	13	DNPQ	Ret	DNQ	DNQ	EX	DNPQ	DNPQ	DNPQ	DNPQ	DNPQ	DNPQ	DNPQ	DNPQ			0	NC
1990	ER189B	Judd CV 3.5 V8	P	34	(Italy) Claudio Langes	DNPQ	DNPQ	DNPQ	DNPQ	DNPQ	DNPQ	DNPQ	DNPQ	DNPQ	DNPQ	DNPQ	DNPQ	DNPQ	DNPQ			0	NC
