= Onyx Grand Prix =

Former British Formula One constructor

Onyx
- Full name: Onyx Grand Prix
- Base: Westergate House, West Sussex, United Kingdom
- Founder(s): Mike Earle; Greg Field
- Noted staff: Mike Earle; Greg Field; Jo Chamberlain; Paul Shakespeare; Jean-Pierre Van Rossem; Martin Dickson; Alan Jenkins; Peter Rheinhardt; Peter Monteverdi
- Noted drivers: (Sweden) Stefan Johansson (Belgium) Bertrand Gachot (Finland) JJ Lehto (Switzerland) Gregor Foitek

Formula One World Championship career
- First entry: 1989 Brazilian Grand Prix
- Races entered: 26 (17 starts)
- Engines: Ford
- Constructors' Championships: 0
- Drivers' Championships: 0
- Race victories: 0
- Pole positions: 0
- Fastest laps: 0
- Final entry: 1990 Hungarian Grand Prix

Onyx Grand Prix is a former Formula One constructor from Britain that competed in the 1989 and 1990 Formula One seasons. The team participated in 26 World Championship Grands Prix (25 starts) and scored six World Constructors' Championship points. Its best result was third place, in the 1989 Portuguese Grand Prix, for Stefan Johansson.

== Pre-Formula One beginnings ==
Onyx Grand Prix began life as Onyx Race Engineering in late 1978 as a partnership between old colleagues Mike Earle and Greg Field. Prior to approaching Field and asking him to join him in a new venture, Earle had had extensive experience in open-wheel racing, running the successful Church Farm Racing team in F3, F2 and Formula 5000, as well as previously working with Field and driver David Purley in the LEC racing team in Formula Atlantic, F2, European Formula 5000 and occasional Formula One races. In their first foray into team ownership the duo intended to enter their own chassis in Formula 2 for the 1979 season but it turned out to be a largely unsuccessful campaign. They returned in 1980 and 1981 running semi-works Marches for Johnny Cecotto and Riccardo Paletti. After a competitive 1981 season Paletti's sponsors took him to Formula One with Osella. Not wanting to be left behind, Onyx tried their hand at F1 by entering a private March in 5 rounds for Spaniard Emilio de Villota, with de Villota failing to qualify for any of the races. Onyx planned to enter their own car once again in 1983 but this time taking a step up into the world of Formula One with a returning Paletti. Disaster struck as Paletti was killed at the 1982 Canadian Grand Prix and this seemed to curtail Onyx's progression forward.

== Next step ==
At this time, co-founder Greg Field decided to leave the team and sold his share to racing enthusiast Jo Chamberlain, which looked like a further step backwards for the team. Some good fortune arrived as March Engineering co-founder Robin Herd had decided to outsource the running of the works March Formula 2 team and he approached Earle and Onyx to do it. Onyx had now inherited a class-leading chassis, a dominant BMW engine and the best Michelin tyres for the 1983 season, along with capable drivers in Beppe Gabbiani, Thierry Tassin and Christian Danner. The season did not turn out to be a good one as the team fell behind the works Ralts. 1984 would see the team slip further behind the Ralts and even a privately entered March. In 1985 Formula 3000 replaced F2 as the stepping-stone series to Formula One and Onyx continued to run the works March effort, finishing 3rd with Emanuele Pirro in 1985, then progressing even further as Pirro finished as runner-up in 1986, before Onyx achieved their finest moment as Stefano Modena was crowned the 1987 Formula 3000 champion. With Modena off to Formula One, Onyx set their sights on retaining the championship with Volker Weidler but 1988 turned out to be a huge disappointment, as Weidler battled with the March 88B, finishing in 15th position overall. Nevertheless, buoyed by a largely successful Formula 2 and Formula 3000 tenure, Earle was now eager to enter Formula One and set about building a solid team with which to enter the pinnacle of motorsport.

== Formula One ==
Prior to entering Formula One, Paul Shakespeare had purchased the majority shares of the team in September 1988 and this provided Onyx with the much needed injection of cash to make the step up. Martin Dickson was hired as team manager and the team was further boosted by sponsorship from Marlboro and Moneytron, a company owned by flamboyant Belgian Jean-Pierre Van Rossem. Van Rossem would soon purchase all of Shakespeare's shares, becoming the majority owner in a deal that would cause the team a considerable number of problems in the future. In the meantime, the team, now rebranded as Onyx Grand Prix, had struck a deal to use Ford V8s and Goodyear tyres. Respected engineer Alan Jenkins, who had previously worked for McLaren, was commissioned to design the team's first Formula One car, resulting in the tidy-looking Onyx ORE-1. Earle went for a mixture of youth and experience on the driving front and hired the respected Stefan Johansson and the young Belgian rookie Bertrand Gachot, who had actually been responsible for the arrival of Van Rossem and his Moneytron sponsorship. With a solid business plan in place, a wealth of experience in junior formulae, a sound car and engine package and a solid driver duo, Onyx Grand Prix looked set to have a rather promising future in Formula One. At the car's debut in England, Autosport's Nigel Roebuck described the Moneytron sponsorship as "the most tasteless I have ever seen".

== 1989 season ==
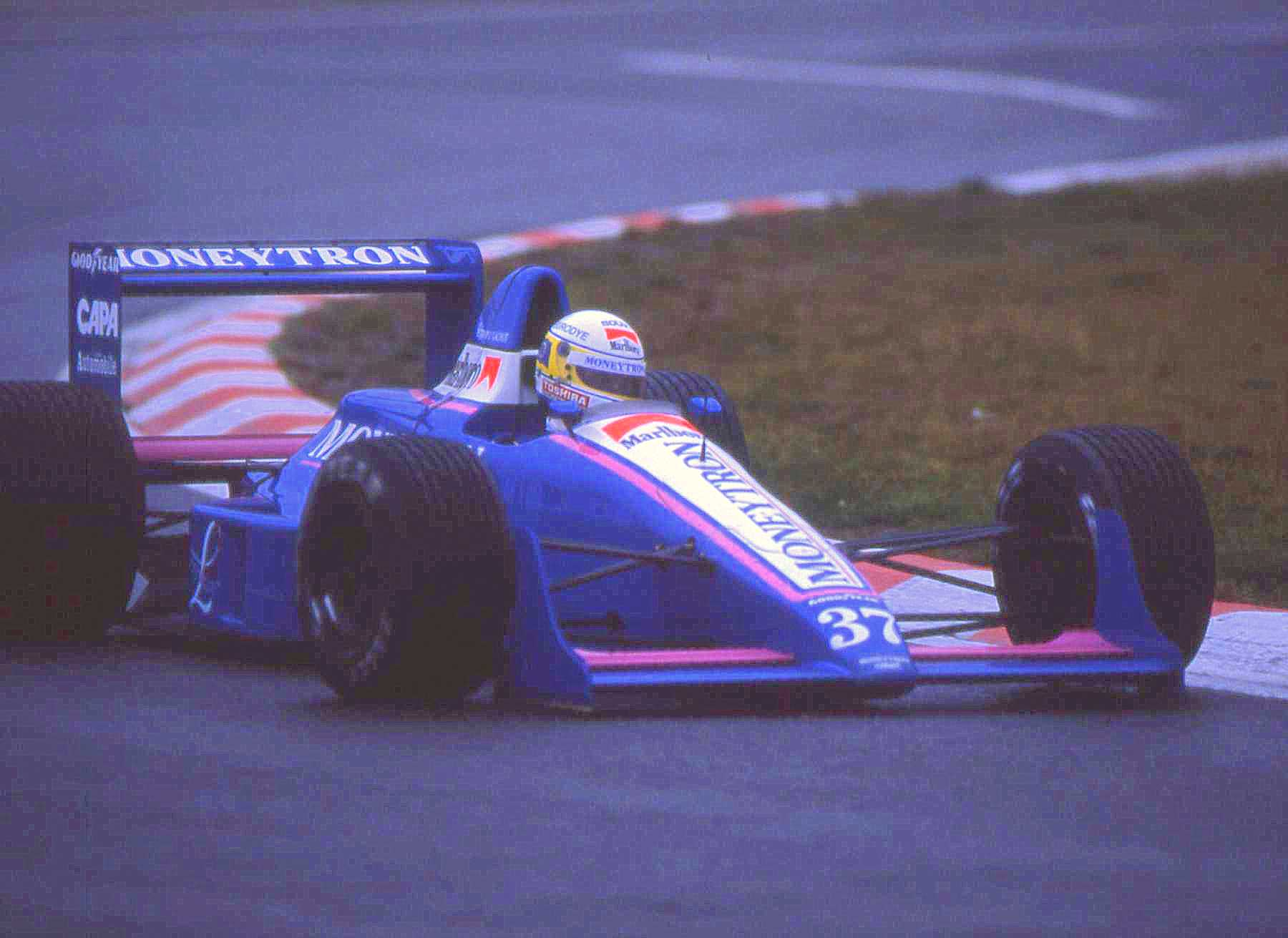
Bertrand Gachot at the 1989 Belgian Grand Prix

Despite all of the excitement and preparation, Onyx only just made it to their first Grand Prix. Their cars were only completed on the morning of their launch, before having to be hastily packed and sent off to Heathrow Airport the same day for transportation to Brazil, the scene of the season's first race. Having had no testing to fine-tune the cars, neither car would make it out of pre-qualifying in the first 3 rounds. Things got worse as a testing accident completely destroyed one chassis prior to the race at Imola and at the race itself, brake failure on Johansson's car resulted in another car-destroying crash. Positive signs were beginning to show as Gachot just missed out on pre-qualifying in Imola, Johansson would do the same at Monaco, before finally Johansson would make it out of pre-qualifying in Mexico, setting the 6th fastest time in Saturday free practice before qualifying 21st for the race, ahead of the illustrious Nelson Piquet and respected drivers Pierluigi Martini, René Arnoux and Eddie Cheever. The car however, and expectedly, would suffer a mechanical failure in its debut race, but progress was being made. More good news arrived at Phoenix with the return of Greg Field who replaced Dickson as Team Manager and Johansson once again making the grid, qualifying 19th before a front suspension failure ended his day. Johansson was once again on the grid in Canada, this time 18th. Gachot had yet to make his first Grand Prix start but he was getting ever closer.

Van Rossem purchased a US$20 million Gulfstream IV business jet prior to the Phoenix Grand Prix. Johansson was also disqualified in Canada after a botched pit-stop saw him tear the air gun rig apart. Amidst all the dark clouds, a sunny day arrived at the 1989 French Grand Prix. Both cars were ideally suited to the Paul Ricard circuit and comfortably finished 1–2 in pre-qualifying. They both had an even more impressive qualifying proper, with Gachot ending up 11th on the grid and Johansson 13th. Gachot ran with Alesi, who finished 4th, before a battery problem put him down to 13th, while Johansson scored the team's first points with a fine 5th place. The two points were now set to get the team out of pre-qualifying for the remainder of the season, but it came to nothing at the next round in Britain. Johansson failed to qualify and Gachot qualified 21st before having his race blighted by handling problems. The Minardis would finish 5th and 6th however, condemning Onyx to the ruthless world of pre-qualifying, although the fact that the two Brabhams and Dallara's Alex Caffi were no longer pre-qualifiers made this task easier for them. Johansson would qualify in Germany, Hungary and Belgium, with Gachot missing out in Germany (which would be the only time during the 1989 season that an Onyx would succeed in getting through pre-qualifying without then going on to qualify). Trouble flared up once again with Van Rossem and his flamboyancy as he had been quoted in the press as saying he was attempting to attract top drivers to the team and was in the process of investing US$40 million into Porsche's F1 engine project while, in reality and behind closed doors, Van Rossem was beginning to bemoan the cost of running a Formula One team and was even rumoured to be reluctant to pay the team's bills. Van Rossem went one step further by saying on Belgian TV that he would quit F1 if the Porsche engine deal fell through. Many saw this as an admission that he was tired of the sport and sought a reason to get out. Van Rossem's spectacularly destructive and erratic antics went on: he also made some controversial comments in a Belgian newspaper during the Belgian GP weekend, drawing the ire of two of F1's most powerful men, F1 commercial rights holder and F1 management CEO Bernie Ecclestone and then-FIA president Jean-Marie Balestre. He denied apparent allegations that he had referred to Balestre as a Nazi (Balestre apparently was part of the pro-Nazi Vichy French military during World War II) and Ecclestone as a Mafia boss. Ecclestone then banned Van Rossem from attending any further Grands Prix.

At the Italian Grand Prix Gachot qualified for what would be his final race for the team, while Johansson failed to make the grid. Gachot raised the ire of his erratic boss and was sacked for voicing his displeasure at the team's lack of testing and an apparent lack of faith in his driving. JJ Lehto was drafted in at the last minute as his replacement, but with little time to familiarise himself with the new car he failed to qualify for the next round in Portugal. Yet again it was Johansson that came to the fore and gave Onyx a reason to smile at the Portuguese Grand Prix. He decided not to change tyres during the race and after everybody else had made their pit-stops and following Mansell and Senna's collision, he was running an incredible 3rd before his tyres started to go off. He was rapidly caught and passed by both Williams but they soon retired and Johansson was left with a clear run home in 3rd, crossing the line with no fuel left. It was a great moment for the team but it would also turn out to be their last points finish. With Van Rossem reluctant to make funds available, development on the car was slow and Johansson would not qualify for the rest of the season, although Lehto would continue to improve, making the grid in Spain and Australia.

The team finished in a respectable 10th position overall in their debut season, scoring 6 points and being rewarded with not having to take part in pre-qualifying for the following season.

== 1990 season ==
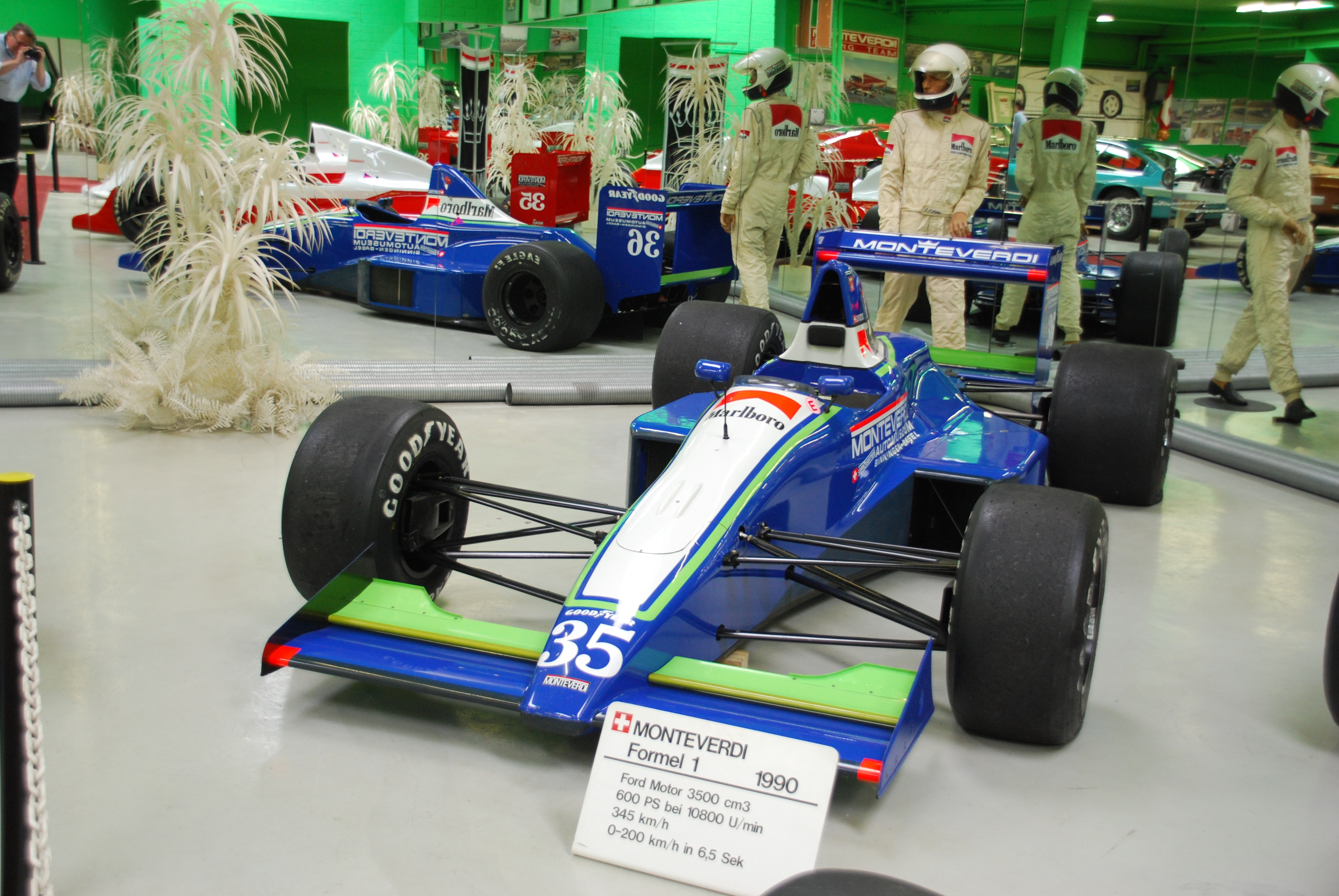
The Onyx ORE-1B that was used in the 1990 season.

After what should have been a solid foundation to build on in 1989, things started coming apart heading into 1990. At the end of the 1989 season Van Rossem's lack of interest began to show. Finances quickly dried up and Van Rossem's flamboyant and uncooperative personality resulted in Earle and Chamberlain quitting the team, with Field leaving for a second time. Alan Jenkins took charge, with Peter Rheinardt taking over as Team Manager from Field. Having failed to secure a deal for either Honda or Porsche V10s for 1991, Van Rossem acted on his threats and left, taking his Moneytron sponsorship with him. Now seeking new ownership, Swiss car collector and former racer Peter Monteverdi purchased 50% of the team, with Karl Foitek purchasing 25% and Brune Frei purchasing the remaining 25%. Onyx was already in such dire financial straits that Foitek had to pay for Goodyear tyres used by the team in 1989 before the company would provide them with tyres for the 1990 season. The team then rehired Earle and Chamberlain, but Alan Jenkins was soon fired after refusing to work with Earle. To make matters worse Earle and Chamberlain left once again, along with Team Manager Rheinhardt and the bulk of Onyx's experienced staff.

For 1990 the team retained JJ Lehto and opted to go with Gregor Foitek, son of part-owner Karl Foitek, in the second car. Foitek was contracted to Brabham for two races so Johansson was kept for the opening two rounds. As little money had been put into developing a car for the 1990 season, Onyx arrived at the opening two rounds with last year's ORE-1. Neither driver qualified for the first two races, with Johansson destroying two chassis in the process. At the San Marino Grand Prix the team arrived with slightly updated ORE-1B chassis. Foitek replaced Johansson, who sued Onyx for breach of contract and, along with Alan Jenkins, attempted to get a court injunction to block Monteverdi's planned relocation of the team. Both cars made the grid at Imola, with Lehto coming home 12th. At Monaco Foitek was running in 6th position at a late stage in the race when he collided with Éric Bernard's Larrousse, resulting in him being classified 7th, a result that would be Onyx's best finish of the season. Both cars made the grid in Canada and Mexico, but could only manage one finish between them, with Foitek's 15th place in Mexico. In July Monteverdi had fulfilled his desire to move the team to Switzerland but that improved nothing. A clear indication of how far behind the team had fallen came in France where both cars failed to make the grid, where at the same track last season they had both qualified high up and netted a points finish. At the British Grand Prix neither car made the grid. By the time of the German Grand Prix, Monteverdi had succeeded in changing the team's name to Monteverdi Onyx Formula One, but once again it meant nothing as although both cars scraped onto the grid, Foitek retired early and Lehto finished six laps behind and was unclassified.

There were also rumours circulating regarding poor car preparation, including broken suspension parts being welded back together instead of being replaced and the cannibalising of Monteverdi's sports car collection for spare parts. One incident saw Lehto repeatedly complaining of poor handling, a problem that was finally solved when his driveshaft was discovered to have been installed the wrong way around. At around this time part-owner Karl Foitek withdrew his money and barred his son from driving a car that he now felt was dangerous. With finances already a huge problem, Foitek's withdrawal was the final straw and the team would ultimately not see out the championship, wrapping up operations at the Hungarian Grand Prix.

== Reformation ==
After a time spent running Arena Motorsport, Earle reformed the team initially to contest the 2014 World Touring Car Championship with TC1 version of Ford Fiesta saloon. However the plans were abolished in February 2014 due to lack of support by Ford. Instead the team was to build the Ford Focus ST for the 2015 TCR International Series season. However, the car was underdeveloped and uncompetitive and only contested half the events in the inaugural season, recording just two classified finishes at Monza, before the assets were sold to the FRD racing team for 2016.

== Complete International Formula 3000 results ==
(Results in bold indicate pole position; Results in italics indicate fastest lap)

Year	Chassis	Engine	Tyres	Driver(s)	1	2	3	4	5	6	7	8	9	10	11	Points	TC
1985	March	Cosworth V8	?		SIL	THR	EST	VAL	PAU	SPA	DIJ	PER	ZEL	ZAN	DON	47	n/a
1985	March	Cosworth V8	?	(Italy) Emanuele Pirro	7	1	4	1	**2**	Ret	Ret	2	4	5	Ret	47	n/a
1985	March	Cosworth V8	?	(United Kingdom) Johnny Dumfries	Ret	7	Ret	6								47	n/a
1985	March	Cosworth V8	?	(Sweden) Mario Hytten					Ret	Ret	12	5	10	Ret	2	47	n/a
1986	March	Cosworth V8	?		SIL	VAL	PAU	SPA	IMO	MUG	PER	ZEL	BIR	BUG	JAR	33.5	n/a
1986	March	Cosworth V8	?	(Italy) Emanuele Pirro	2	3	**2**	19	Ret	6	13	Ret	Ret	**1**	**1**	33.5	n/a
1986	March	Cosworth V8	?	(United States) John Jones	20	DNQ	6	Ret	DNQ	12	11	14	7	15	10	33.5	n/a
1986	March	Cosworth V8	?	(United States) Cary Bren	21	DNQ	DNQ	DNQ								33.5	n/a
1986	March	Cosworth V8	?	(South Africa) Wayne Taylor							DNQ					33.5	n/a
1986	March	Cosworth V8	?	(United Kingdom) Russell Spence								11	6	10	Ret	33.5	n/a
1987	March	Cosworth V8	?		SIL	VAL	SPA	PAU	DON	PER	BRH	BIR	IMO	BUG	JAR	47	2
1987	March	Cosworth V8	?	(Italy) Stefano Modena	4	1	Ret	Ret	2	6	4	1	1	Ret	6	47	2
1987	March	Cosworth V8	?	(France) Pierre-Henri Raphanel	16	4	8	**Ret**	3	Ret	Ret	Ret	Ret	14	Ret	47	2

== Complete Formula One results ==
(key)

Year	Entrant	Chassis	Engines	Tyres	Drivers	1	2	3	4	5	6	7	8	9	10	11	12	13	14	15	16	Points	WCC
1989	Onyx Moneytron Formula One Team	Onyx ORE-1	Ford DFR V8	G		BRA	SMR	MON	MEX	USA	CAN	FRA	GBR	GER	HUN	BEL	ITA	POR	ESP	JPN	AUS	6	10th
1989	Onyx Moneytron Formula One Team	Onyx ORE-1	Ford DFR V8	G	(Sweden) Stefan Johansson	DNPQ	DNPQ	DNPQ	Ret	Ret	DSQ	5	DNPQ	Ret	Ret	8	DNPQ	3	DNPQ	DNPQ	DNPQ	6	10th
1989	Onyx Moneytron Formula One Team	Onyx ORE-1	Ford DFR V8	G	(Belgium) Bertrand Gachot	DNPQ	DNPQ	DNPQ	DNPQ	DNPQ	DNPQ	13	12	DNQ	Ret	Ret	Ret					6	10th
1989	Onyx Moneytron Formula One Team	Onyx ORE-1	Ford DFR V8	G	(Finland) JJ Lehto													DNPQ	Ret	DNPQ	Ret	6	10th
1990	Monteverdi Onyx Formula One	Onyx ORE-1; Onyx ORE-1B	Ford DFR V8	G		USA	BRA	SMR	MON	CAN	MEX	FRA	GBR	GER	HUN	BEL	ITA	POR	ESP	JPN	AUS	0	NC
1990	Monteverdi Onyx Formula One	Onyx ORE-1; Onyx ORE-1B	Ford DFR V8	G	(Sweden) Stefan Johansson	DNQ	DNQ															0	NC
1990	Monteverdi Onyx Formula One	Onyx ORE-1; Onyx ORE-1B	Ford DFR V8	G	(Switzerland) Gregor Foitek			Ret	7	Ret	15	DNQ	DNQ	Ret	DNQ							0	NC
1990	Monteverdi Onyx Formula One	Onyx ORE-1; Onyx ORE-1B	Ford DFR V8	G	(Finland) JJ Lehto	DNQ	DNQ	12	Ret	Ret	Ret	DNQ	DNQ	NC	DNQ							0	NC
