= 1990 French Grand Prix =

7th round of the 1990 Formula One season

- Race 7 of 16 in the 1990 Formula One World Championship
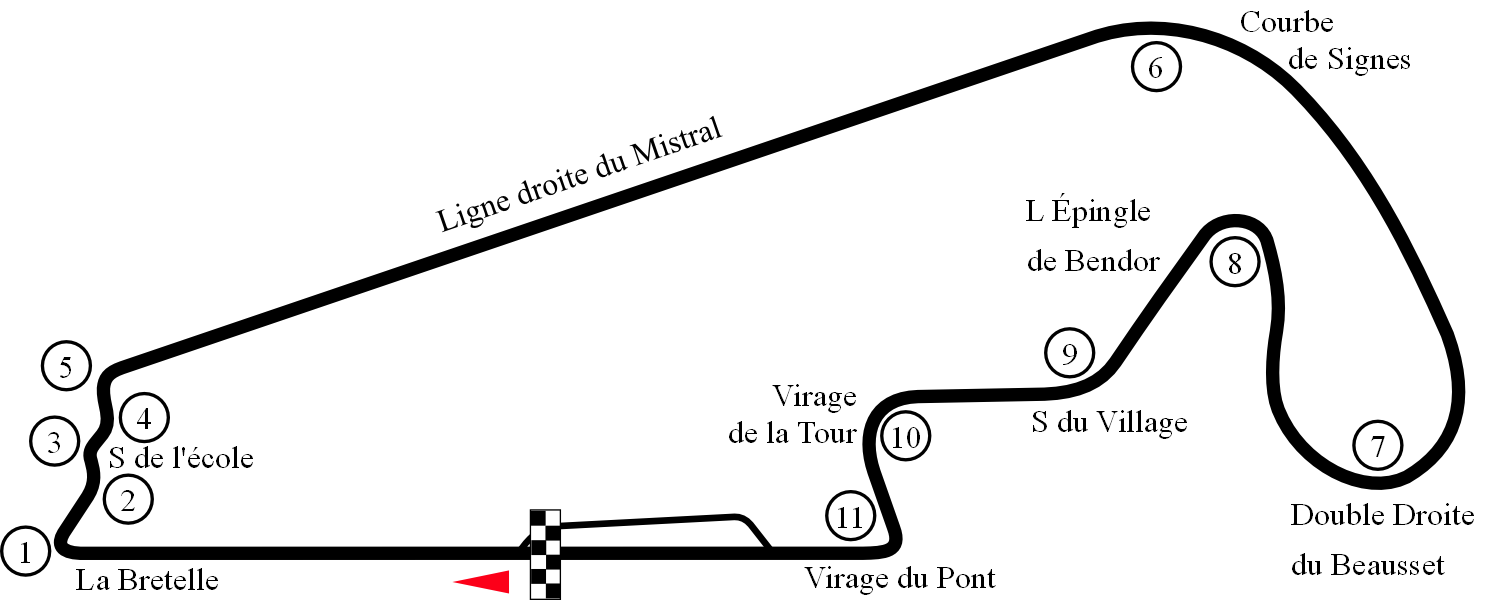

Race details
- Date: 8 July 1990
- Official name: Rhône-Poulenc Grand Prix de France
- Location: Paul Ricard; France
- Course: Permanent racing facility
- Course length: 3.813 km (2.369 miles)
- Distance: 80 laps, 305.040 km (189.543 miles)
- Weather: Hot, dry, sunny

Pole position
| Driver | (United Kingdom) Nigel Mansell | Ferrari |
- Time: 1:04.402

Fastest lap
| Driver | (United Kingdom) Nigel Mansell | Ferrari |
- Time: 1:08.012 on lap 64

Podium
| First | (France) Alain Prost | Ferrari |
| Second | (Italy) Ivan Capelli | Leyton House-Judd |
| Third | (Brazil) Ayrton Senna | McLaren-Honda |

The 1990 French Grand Prix was a Formula One motor race held at Paul Ricard on 8 July 1990. It was the seventh race of the 1990 Formula One World Championship. It was the 68th French Grand Prix and the 14th and last to be held at Paul Ricard until the 2018 French Grand Prix. It was held over 80 laps of the four kilometre circuit for a race distance of 305 kilometres. This race was held the same day as the 1990 FIFA World Cup Final in Rome, Italy, but that event took place later in the day from this Grand Prix.

The race almost saw one of the most remarkable upsets in Formula One history with the Leyton House Racing team of Italian driver Ivan Capelli and Brazilian driver Maurício Gugelmin running first and second for an extended period of the race in their Leyton House CG901s. Local driver Alain Prost claimed the lead late in the race to take the win in his Ferrari 641 by eight seconds over Capelli. Brazilian driver Ayrton Senna finished third in his McLaren MP4/5B.

The win, Prost's third for the season, marked Ferrari's 100th race victory in Formula One, and closed the gap to championship points leader Senna to just three points.

== Qualifying ==
=== Pre-qualifying report ===
In the Friday morning pre-qualifying session, it was a return to the top two places for the Larrousse-Lola drivers, their fourth 1–2 of the season. Éric Bernard was over a second faster than his team-mate Aguri Suzuki, who in turn was seven tenths faster than the next fastest driver. For the first time this season, at their home race, both AGS drivers pre-qualified, with Gabriele Tarquini third and Yannick Dalmas fourth. It was the first successful pre-qualification for Tarquini this season, and only the second for Dalmas.

In fifth place, missing out by just under seven hundredths of a second, was Olivier Grouillard in the sole Osella, the first time he had failed to pre-qualify in 1990. Sixth was Roberto Moreno in his EuroBrun, some way adrift of Grouillard and nearly five seconds off Bernard's pace. It was the second time this season Moreno had failed to pre-qualify. Seventh, and much closer to his team-mate this time, was Claudio Langes in the other EuroBrun. The other two runners were not remotely competitive; Bertrand Gachot suffered an engine failure on his first lap in his Coloni, still with the heavy, fragile and underpowered Subaru engine, while Bruno Giacomelli failed to leave the pits in the Life.

=== Pre-qualifying classification ===
| Pos | No | Driver | Constructor | Time | Gap |
|---|---|---|---|---|---|
| 1 | 29 | (France) Éric Bernard | Lola-Lamborghini | 1:05.165 | — |
| 2 | 30 | (Japan) Aguri Suzuki | Lola-Lamborghini | 1:06.505 | +1.340 |
| 3 | 17 | (Italy) Gabriele Tarquini | AGS-Ford | 1:07.232 | +2.067 |
| 4 | 18 | (France) Yannick Dalmas | AGS-Ford | 1:08.151 | +2.986 |
| 5 | 14 | (France) Olivier Grouillard | Osella-Ford | 1:08.219 | +3.054 |
| 6 | 33 | (Brazil) Roberto Moreno | EuroBrun-Judd | 1:09.885 | +4.720 |
| 7 | 34 | (Italy) Claudio Langes | EuroBrun-Judd | 1:10.368 | +5.203 |
| 8 | 31 | (Belgium) Bertrand Gachot | Coloni-Subaru | 4:02.465 | +2:57.300 |
| 9 | 39 | (Italy) Bruno Giacomelli | Life | no time | — |

=== Qualifying report ===
Nigel Mansell took pole position from Gerhard Berger and Ayrton Senna being followed by Alain Prost, Alessandro Nannini fifth, Riccardo Patrese sixth, Ivan Capelli seventh followed by Thierry Boutsen in eighth, Nelson Piquet in ninth and Maurício Gugelmin tenth.

=== Qualifying classification ===
| Pos | No | Driver | Constructor | Q1 | Q2 | Gap |
|---|---|---|---|---|---|---|
| 1 | 2 | (United Kingdom) Nigel Mansell | Ferrari | 1:04.402 | 1:04.871 | — |
| 2 | 28 | (Austria) Gerhard Berger | McLaren-Honda | 1:05.350 | 1:04.512 | +0.110 |
| 3 | 27 | (Brazil) Ayrton Senna | McLaren-Honda | 1:04.549 | 1:08.886 | +0.147 |
| 4 | 1 | (France) Alain Prost | Ferrari | 1:04.792 | 1:04.781 | +0.379 |
| 5 | 19 | (Italy) Alessandro Nannini | Benetton-Ford | 1:05.670 | 1:05.009 | +0.607 |
| 6 | 6 | (Italy) Riccardo Patrese | Williams-Renault | 1:05.059 | 1:05.394 | +0.657 |
| 7 | 16 | (Italy) Ivan Capelli | Leyton House-Judd | 1:06.384 | 1:05.369 | +0.967 |
| 8 | 5 | (Belgium) Thierry Boutsen | Williams-Renault | 1:05.446 | 1:06.394 | +1.044 |
| 9 | 20 | (Brazil) Nelson Piquet | Benetton-Ford | 1:05.640 | 1:05.744 | +1.238 |
| 10 | 15 | (Brazil) Maurício Gugelmin | Leyton House-Judd | 1:05.818 | 1:06.446 | +1.416 |
| 11 | 29 | (France) Éric Bernard | Lola-Lamborghini | 1:05.910 | 1:05.852 | +1.450 |
| 12 | 26 | (France) Philippe Alliot | Ligier-Ford | 1:05.980 | 1:06.866 | +1.578 |
| 13 | 4 | (France) Jean Alesi | Tyrrell-Ford | 1:06.084 | 1:06.200 | +1.682 |
| 14 | 30 | (Japan) Aguri Suzuki | Lola-Lamborghini | 1:06.100 | 1:06.158 | +1.598 |
| 15 | 3 | (Japan) Satoru Nakajima | Tyrrell-Ford | 1:06.999 | 1:06.563 | +2.161 |
| 16 | 11 | (United Kingdom) Derek Warwick | Lotus-Lamborghini | 1:06.624 | 1:07.031 | +2.222 |
| 17 | 12 | (United Kingdom) Martin Donnelly | Lotus-Lamborghini | 1:06.647 | 1:07.248 | +2.245 |
| 18 | 9 | (Italy) Michele Alboreto | Arrows-Ford | 1:06.847 | 1:07.239 | +2.445 |
| 19 | 25 | (Italy) Nicola Larini | Ligier-Ford | 1:07.224 | 1:06.856 | +2.444 |
| 20 | 8 | (Italy) Stefano Modena | Brabham-Judd | 1:06.937 | 1:06.943 | +2.535 |
| 21 | 22 | (Italy) Andrea de Cesaris | Dallara-Ford | 1:09.727 | 1:07.137 | +2.735 |
| 22 | 10 | (Italy) Alex Caffi | Arrows-Ford | 1:07.496 | 1:07.207 | +2.805 |
| 23 | 23 | (Italy) Pierluigi Martini | Minardi-Ford | 1:07.315 | 1:07.333 | +2.913 |
| 24 | 21 | (Italy) Emanuele Pirro | Dallara-Ford | 1:07.687 | 1:07.692 | +3.285 |
| 25 | 7 | (Australia) David Brabham | Brabham-Judd | 1:07.733 | 1:08.532 | +3.331 |
| 26 | 18 | (France) Yannick Dalmas | AGS-Ford | 1:08.630 | 1:07.926 | +3.524 |
| 27 | 24 | (Italy) Paolo Barilla | Minardi-Ford | 1:08.008 | 1:08.592 | +3.606 |
| 28 | 17 | (Italy) Gabriele Tarquini | AGS-Ford | 1:09.176 | 1:08.147 | +3.745 |
| 29 | 35 | (Switzerland) Gregor Foitek | Onyx-Ford | 1:08.794 | 1:08.232 | +3.830 |
| 30 | 36 | (Finland) JJ Lehto | Onyx-Ford | 1:08.954 | 1:08.487 | +4.085 |

== Race ==
=== Race report ===
The Leyton House cars of Ivan Capelli and Maurício Gugelmin ran first and second for almost two-thirds of the race. Neither car had qualified for the previous race in Mexico, but on the smooth surface of Paul Ricard with its 1.1 km long Mistral Straight, the team were able to exploit their highly efficient aerodynamic package, as well as being the only team to attempt to race without stopping for fresh tyres. Gugelmin stopped late in the race while third, and Capelli led until three laps from home when his engine encountered problems and dropped to second.

Berger took the lead at the start followed by pole sitter Mansell, Senna, Nannini, Patrese, Prost, Boutsen, Piquet and Jean Alesi. Later in the race when the leaders pitted, Capelli took the lead being followed by teammate Gugelmin. Prost overtook Gugelmin on lap 54 and Gugelmin's engine blew on lap 57. Mansell was battling for seventh position with the McLaren of Gerhard Berger after his second pit-stop, but was eventually forced to retire on lap 73 with engine troubles (Mansell was classified 18th). Alessandro Nannini overtook Senna for third place but eventually retired three laps after Mansell with electrical problems (Nannini was classified 16th). Prost overtook Capelli for the lead on lap 77 of 80 and went on to win in front of his home crowd at the last French Grand Prix held at Paul Ricard before the race was moved to Magny-Cours in 1991 for many years until it eventually returned to Paul Ricard in 2018.

Prost's win was the 42nd of his career, his third French Grand Prix in succession, his fifth French GP overall (and his fourth at Paul Ricard), and the 100th Grand Prix victory for Ferrari. Prost won ahead of Capelli, Senna, Piquet and Berger, with Patrese rounding out the top six. It proved to be the third and last podium finish for Ivan Capelli, and the only podium finish for the Leyton House Racing team.

=== Race classification ===
| Pos | No | Driver | Constructor | Laps | Time/Retired | Grid | Points |
|---|---|---|---|---|---|---|---|
| 1 | 1 | (France) Alain Prost | Ferrari | 80 | 1:33:29.606 | 4 | 9 |
| 2 | 16 | (Italy) Ivan Capelli | Leyton House-Judd | 80 | + 8.626 | 7 | 6 |
| 3 | 27 | (Brazil) Ayrton Senna | McLaren-Honda | 80 | + 11.606 | 3 | 4 |
| 4 | 20 | (Brazil) Nelson Piquet | Benetton-Ford | 80 | + 41.207 | 9 | 3 |
| 5 | 28 | (Austria) Gerhard Berger | McLaren-Honda | 80 | + 42.219 | 2 | 2 |
| 6 | 6 | (Italy) Riccardo Patrese | Williams-Renault | 80 | + 1:09.351 | 6 | 1 |
| 7 | 30 | (Japan) Aguri Suzuki | Lola-Lamborghini | 79 | + 1 lap | 14 | |
| 8 | 29 | (France) Éric Bernard | Lola-Lamborghini | 79 | + 1 lap | 11 | |
| 9 | 26 | (France) Philippe Alliot | Ligier-Ford | 79 | + 1 lap | 12 | |
| 10 | 9 | (Italy) Michele Alboreto | Arrows-Ford | 79 | + 1 lap | 18 | |
| 11 | 11 | (United Kingdom) Derek Warwick | Lotus-Lamborghini | 79 | + 1 lap | 16 | |
| 12 | 12 | (United Kingdom) Martin Donnelly | Lotus-Lamborghini | 79 | + 1 lap | 17 | |
| 13 | 8 | (Italy) Stefano Modena | Brabham-Judd | 78 | + 2 laps | 20 | |
| 14 | 25 | (Italy) Nicola Larini | Ligier-Ford | 78 | + 2 laps | 19 | |
| 15 | 7 | (Australia) David Brabham | Brabham-Judd | 77 | + 3 laps | 25 | |
| 16 | 19 | (Italy) Alessandro Nannini | Benetton-Ford | 75 | Electrical | 5 | |
| 17 | 18 | (France) Yannick Dalmas | AGS-Ford | 75 | + 5 laps | 26 | |
| 18 | 2 | (United Kingdom) Nigel Mansell | Ferrari | 72 | Engine | 1 | |
| DSQ | 22 | (Italy) Andrea de Cesaris | Dallara-Ford | 78 | Underweight | 21 | |
| Ret | 3 | (Japan) Satoru Nakajima | Tyrrell-Ford | 63 | Gearbox | 15 | |
| Ret | 15 | (Brazil) Maurício Gugelmin | Leyton House-Judd | 58 | Engine | 10 | |
| Ret | 23 | (Italy) Pierluigi Martini | Minardi-Ford | 40 | Electrical | 23 | |
| Ret | 4 | (France) Jean Alesi | Tyrrell-Ford | 23 | Differential | 13 | |
| Ret | 10 | (Italy) Alex Caffi | Arrows-Ford | 22 | Suspension | 22 | |
| Ret | 5 | (Belgium) Thierry Boutsen | Williams-Renault | 7 | Engine | 8 | |
| Ret | 21 | (Italy) Emanuele Pirro | Dallara-Ford | 7 | Brakes | 24 | |
| DNQ | 24 | (Italy) Paolo Barilla | Minardi-Ford | | | | |
| DNQ | 17 | (Italy) Gabriele Tarquini | AGS-Ford | | | | |
| DNQ | 35 | (Switzerland) Gregor Foitek | Onyx-Ford | | | | |
| DNQ | 36 | (Finland) JJ Lehto | Onyx-Ford | | | | |
| DNPQ | 14 | (France) Olivier Grouillard | Osella-Ford | | | | |
| DNPQ | 33 | (Brazil) Roberto Moreno | EuroBrun-Judd | | | | |
| DNPQ | 34 | (Italy) Claudio Langes | EuroBrun-Judd | | | | |
| DNPQ | 31 | (Belgium) Bertrand Gachot | Coloni-Subaru | | | | |
| DNPQ | 39 | (Italy) Bruno Giacomelli | Life | | | | |

== Championship standings after the race ==
Drivers' Championship standings

| Pos | Driver | Points |
|---|---|---|
| 1 | (Brazil) Ayrton Senna | 35 |
| 2 | (France) Alain Prost | 32 |
| 3 | (Austria) Gerhard Berger | 25 |
| 4 | (Brazil) Nelson Piquet | 16 |
| 5 | (France) Jean Alesi | 13 |

Constructors' Championship standings

| Pos | Constructor | Points |
|---|---|---|
| 1 | (United Kingdom) McLaren-Honda | 60 |
| 2 | (Italy) Ferrari | 45 |
| 3 | (United Kingdom) Benetton-Ford | 23 |
| 4 | (United Kingdom) Williams-Renault | 21 |
| 5 | (United Kingdom) Tyrrell-Ford | 14 |

- Note: Only the top five positions are included for both sets of standings.

| Previous race: 1990 Mexican Grand Prix | FIA Formula One World Championship; 1990 season | Next race: 1990 British Grand Prix |
| Previous race: 1989 French Grand Prix | French Grand Prix | Next race: 1991 French Grand Prix; Next race at Paul Ricard: 2018 French Grand Prix |
