= 1990 Monaco Grand Prix =

Coordinates: 43°44′4.74″N 7°25′16.8″E

- Race 4 of 16 in the 1990 Formula One World Championship
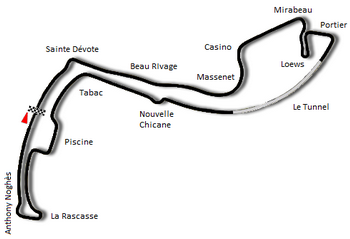

Race details
- Date: 27 May 1990
- Official name: XLVIII Grand Prix Automobile de Monaco
- Location: Circuit de Monaco; Monte Carlo, Monaco
- Course: Temporary street circuit
- Course length: 3.328 km (2.068 miles)
- Distance: 78 laps, 259.584 km (161.298 miles)
- Weather: Warm, dry, sunny

Pole position
Driver	(Brazil) Ayrton Senna	McLaren-Honda
- Time: 1:21.314

Fastest lap
Driver	(Brazil) Ayrton Senna	McLaren-Honda
- Time: 1:24.468 on lap 59

Podium
First	(Brazil) Ayrton Senna	McLaren-Honda
Second	(France) Jean Alesi	Tyrrell-Ford
Third	(Austria) Gerhard Berger	McLaren-Honda

The 1990 Monaco Grand Prix was a Formula One motor race held on 27 May 1990 at Monaco. It was the fourth race of the 1990 Formula One World Championship and the 48th Monaco Grand Prix. The race was held over 78 laps of the 3.32-kilometre (2.06 mi) circuit for a race distance of 259 kilometres (161 mi).

The race was won by Brazilian driver Ayrton Senna, driving a McLaren-Honda. Senna started from pole position, led every lap and set the fastest race lap, en route to his second consecutive Monaco win and third in all. French driver Jean Alesi finished second in a Tyrrell-Ford, with Senna's Austrian teammate Gerhard Berger third.

== Qualifying ==
=== Pre-qualifying report ===
The four successful pre-qualifiers in the one-hour Thursday morning session were the same four drivers as at the previous race at Imola, in the same order. The Larrousse-Lola cars finished first and second for the third time in a row, with Éric Bernard again outpacing his teammate Aguri Suzuki. The Osella of Olivier Grouillard was third fastest, followed by Roberto Moreno in the EuroBrun.

The AGS drivers were frozen out in fifth and sixth, with Gabriele Tarquini considerably faster than Yannick Dalmas on this occasion. Seventh was Claudio Langes in the second EuroBrun, six seconds off Bernard's pace. The other two runners were far behind; Bertrand Gachot was over twelve seconds adrift in the Coloni after another engine failure, with the team now in some disarray, but still nearly two seconds faster than the Life, driven again by Bruno Giacomelli. This time, however, the Italian managed to complete a stint of seven laps and return to the pits without breaking down. Well off the pace, Giacomelli went back out on to the circuit and completed another lap before the W12 engine failed.

=== Pre-qualifying classification ===
Pos	No	Driver	Constructor	Time	Gap
1	29	(France) Éric Bernard	Lola-Lamborghini	1:27.134	—
2	30	(Japan) Aguri Suzuki	Lola-Lamborghini	1:27.548	+0.414
3	14	(France) Olivier Grouillard	Osella-Ford	1:27.938	+0.804
4	33	(Brazil) Roberto Moreno	EuroBrun-Judd	1:28.295	+1.161
5	17	(Italy) Gabriele Tarquini	AGS-Ford	1:28.677	+1.543
6	18	(France) Yannick Dalmas	AGS-Ford	1:30.511	+3.377
7	34	(Italy) Claudio Langes	EuroBrun-Judd	1:33.195	+6.061
8	31	(Belgium) Bertrand Gachot	Coloni-Subaru	1:39.295	+12.161
9	39	(Italy) Bruno Giacomelli	Life	1:41.187	+14.053

=== Qualifying report ===
There were no surprises in qualifying with Ayrton Senna taking pole from his rival Alain Prost. Jean Alesi continued to impress in his Tyrrell, qualifying third ahead of Riccardo Patrese. Row three was formed of Gerhard Berger and Thierry Boutsen; Nigel Mansell lined up seventh alongside the Minardi of Pierluigi Martini, while Emanuele Pirro and Nelson Piquet rounded out the top ten. Young Australian driver David Brabham qualified in 25th, thus making his first Formula One race start.

=== Qualifying classification ===
Pos	No	Driver	Constructor	Q1	Q2	Gap
1	27	(Brazil) Ayrton Senna	McLaren-Honda	1:21.797	1:21.314	—
2	1	(France) Alain Prost	Ferrari	1:23.449	1:21.776	+0.462
3	4	(France) Jean Alesi	Tyrrell-Ford	1:23.372	1:21.801	+0.487
4	6	(Italy) Riccardo Patrese	Williams-Renault	1:24.179	1:22.026	+0.712
5	28	(Austria) Gerhard Berger	McLaren-Honda	1:23.001	1:22.682	+1.368
6	5	(Belgium) Thierry Boutsen	Williams-Renault	1:23.936	1:22.691	+1.377
7	2	(United Kingdom) Nigel Mansell	Ferrari	1:24.433	1:22.733	+1.419
8	23	(Italy) Pierluigi Martini	Minardi-Ford	1:24.012	1:23.149	+1.835
9	21	(Italy) Emanuele Pirro	Dallara-Ford	1:24.766	1:23.494	+2.180
10	20	(Brazil) Nelson Piquet	Benetton-Ford	1:25.273	1:23.566	+2.252
11	12	(United Kingdom) Martin Donnelly	Lotus-Lamborghini	1:24.724	1:23.600	+2.286
12	22	(Italy) Andrea de Cesaris	Dallara-Ford	1:25.849	1:23.613	+2.299
13	11	(United Kingdom) Derek Warwick	Lotus-Lamborghini	1:24.070	1:23.656	+2.342
14	8	(Italy) Stefano Modena	Brabham-Judd	1:25.485	1:23.920	+2.606
15	30	(Japan) Aguri Suzuki	Lola-Lamborghini	1:27.193	1:24.023	+2.709
16	19	(Italy) Alessandro Nannini	Benetton-Ford	1:25.926	1:24.139	+2.825
17	25	(Italy) Nicola Larini	Ligier-Ford	1:24.206	1:24.270	+2.892
18	26	(France) Philippe Alliot	Ligier-Ford	1:25.387	1:24.294	+2.980
19	24	(Italy) Paolo Barilla	Minardi-Ford	1:26.352	1:24.334	+3.020
20	35	(Switzerland) Gregor Foitek	Onyx-Ford	1:26.183	1:24.367	+3.053
21	3	(Japan) Satoru Nakajima	Tyrrell-Ford	1:25.679	1:24.371	+3.057
22	10	(Italy) Alex Caffi	Arrows-Ford	1:26.520	1:25.000	+3.686
23	16	(Italy) Ivan Capelli	Leyton House-Judd	1:26.969	1:25.020	+3.706
24	29	(France) Éric Bernard	Lola-Lamborghini	1:25.398	1:25.541	+4.084
25	7	(Australia) David Brabham	Brabham-Judd	1:28.339	1:25.420	+4.106
26	36	(Finland) JJ Lehto	Onyx-Ford	1:27.923	1:25.508	+4.194
27	9	(Italy) Michele Alboreto	Arrows-Ford	1:27.282	1:25.622	+4.308
28	14	(France) Olivier Grouillard	Osella-Ford	1:25.785	1:26.781	+4.471
29	15	(Brazil) Maurício Gugelmin	Leyton House-Judd	1:26.943	1:26.192	+4.878
30	33	(Brazil) Roberto Moreno	EuroBrun-Judd	1:26.604	1:27.265	+5.290

== Race ==
=== Race report ===
At the start there was an overly long delay between the red and green lights, which caused the drivers to be a little more agitated than usual, resulting in an accident between Prost and Berger at the Mirabeau corner. The track was blocked and the race had to be stopped. At the second start everything went to plan and Senna led from Prost, Alesi, Berger, Patrese and Boutsen, with Pirro being the first retirement when his engine blew on the opening lap. Eighth-placed Nigel Mansell was the centre of action in the early stages, quickly passing Martini before setting off after Boutsen, but his overtaking attempt on the Belgian was unsuccessful as he touched the back of the Williams at the seafront chicane and had to limp back to the pits for a new front wing. At the front Senna led comfortably, even more so after Prost retired on lap 30 with battery problems. On lap 35, Piquet spun approaching Loewes Hairpin and stalled his engine; he received a push start from the marshals and was disqualified as a result. While Senna maintained his lead, there was action further back where Mansell was charging through the field. First he disposed of Derek Warwick and then managed to successfully pass Boutsen for fourth, as Alesi and Berger fought over second place. In the late stages Senna started to slow, which allowed Alesi and Berger to close up on him, but Senna's McLaren survived to the finish for his third career win at Monaco. Alesi was second, followed by Berger, Boutsen, Alex Caffi and the only other survivor, Éric Bernard, who had taken sixth place in the late stages after he had forced himself past Gregor Foitek's Onyx by pushing him into the wall. In doing so, Bernard earned his first point in Formula One. Despite not finishing the race, Foitek was classified seventh, his best F1 result.

=== Race classification ===
Pos	No	Driver	Constructor	Laps	Time/Retired	Grid	Points
1	27	(Brazil) Ayrton Senna	McLaren-Honda	78	1:52:46.982	1	9
2	4	(France) Jean Alesi	Tyrrell-Ford	78	+ 1.087	3	6
3	28	(Austria) Gerhard Berger	McLaren-Honda	78	+ 2.073	5	4
4	5	(Belgium) Thierry Boutsen	Williams-Renault	77	+ 1 lap	6	3
5	10	(Italy) Alex Caffi	Arrows-Ford	76	+ 2 laps	22	2
6	29	(France) Éric Bernard	Lola-Lamborghini	76	+ 2 laps	24	1
7	35	(Switzerland) Gregor Foitek	Onyx-Ford	72	Collision	20	
Ret	11	(United Kingdom) Derek Warwick	Lotus-Lamborghini	66	Spun off	13	
Ret	2	(United Kingdom) Nigel Mansell	Ferrari	63	Battery	7	
Ret	24	(Italy) Paolo Barilla	Minardi-Ford	52	Gearbox	19	
Ret	36	(Finland) JJ Lehto	Onyx-Ford	52	Gearbox	26	
Ret	26	(France) Philippe Alliot	Ligier-Ford	47	Gearbox	18	
Ret	6	(Italy) Riccardo Patrese	Williams-Renault	41	Distributor	4	
Ret	22	(Italy) Andrea de Cesaris	Dallara-Ford	38	Engine	12	
Ret	3	(Japan) Satoru Nakajima	Tyrrell-Ford	36	Spun off	21	
Ret	1	(France) Alain Prost	Ferrari	30	Battery	2	
Ret	19	(Italy) Alessandro Nannini	Benetton-Ford	20	Gearbox	16	
Ret	7	(Australia) David Brabham	Brabham-Judd	16	Transmission	25	
Ret	16	(Italy) Ivan Capelli	Leyton House-Judd	13	Brakes	23	
Ret	25	(Italy) Nicola Larini	Ligier-Ford	12	Differential	17	
Ret	30	(Japan) Aguri Suzuki	Lola-Lamborghini	11	Steering	15	
Ret	23	(Italy) Pierluigi Martini	Minardi-Ford	7	Electrical	8	
Ret	12	(United Kingdom) Martin Donnelly	Lotus-Lamborghini	6	Gearbox	11	
Ret	8	(Italy) Stefano Modena	Brabham-Judd	3	Transmission	14	
Ret	21	(Italy) Emanuele Pirro	Dallara-Ford	0	Engine	9	
DSQ	20	(Brazil) Nelson Piquet	Benetton-Ford	34	Push start	10	
DNQ	9	(Italy) Michele Alboreto	Arrows-Ford				
DNQ	14	(France) Olivier Grouillard	Osella-Ford				
DNQ	15	(Brazil) Maurício Gugelmin	Leyton House-Judd				
DNQ	33	(Brazil) Roberto Moreno	EuroBrun-Judd				
DNPQ	17	(Italy) Gabriele Tarquini	AGS-Ford				
DNPQ	18	(France) Yannick Dalmas	AGS-Ford				
DNPQ	34	(Italy) Claudio Langes	EuroBrun-Judd				
DNPQ	31	(Belgium) Bertrand Gachot	Coloni-Subaru				
DNPQ	39	(Italy) Bruno Giacomelli	Life				

== Championship standings after the race ==
Drivers' Championship standings

Pos	Driver	Points
1	(Brazil) Ayrton Senna	22
2	(Austria) Gerhard Berger	16
3	(France) Jean Alesi	13
4	(France) Alain Prost	12
5	(Italy) Riccardo Patrese	9

Constructors' Championship standings

Pos	Constructor	Points
1	(United Kingdom) McLaren-Honda	38
2	(United Kingdom) Williams-Renault	18
3	(Italy) Ferrari	15
4	(United Kingdom) Tyrrell-Ford	14
5	(United Kingdom) Benetton-Ford	10

- Note: Only the top five positions are included for both sets of standings.

Previous race: 1990 San Marino Grand Prix	FIA Formula One World Championship; 1990 season	Next race: 1990 Canadian Grand Prix
Previous race: 1989 Monaco Grand Prix	Monaco Grand Prix	Next race: 1991 Monaco Grand Prix
