= Claudio Langes =

Italian racing driver (born 1961)

- Born: 4 August 1961 (age 65); Brescia, Italy

Formula One World Championship career
- Nationality: (Italy) Italian
- Active years: 1990
- Team: EuroBrun
- Entries: 14 (0 starts)
- Championships: 0
- Wins: 0
- Podiums: 0
- Career points: 0
- Pole positions: 0
- Fastest laps: 0
- First entry: 1990 United States Grand Prix
- Last entry: 1990 Spanish Grand Prix

Claudio Langes (born 4 August 1961) is a former racing driver from Italy.

In 1978, Langes won the Italian 125 cc go-kart championship. In subsequent years, he competed in Formula 3 and in Formula 3000, where his best result was a second place at Pergusa-Enna, achieved in 1989 with a Lola Formula 3000.

Reaching Formula One in 1990, Langes failed to pre-qualify for all 14 of the grands prix that he entered with EuroBrun (still a record). Aside from Gary Brabham and Bruno Giacomelli in the Life entries, and at times Bertrand Gachot's Coloni, Langes was always the next slowest, often several seconds slower than his teammate Roberto Moreno before the cash-strapped team was closed. Langes later raced in touring cars.

== Racing record ==
=== Complete International Formula 3000 results ===
(key) (Races in bold indicate pole position; races in italics indicate fastest lap.)

Year	Entrant	Chassis	Engine	1	2	3	4	5	6	7	8	9	10	11	12	Pos.	Pts
1985	Barron Racing	Tyrrell 012	Cosworth	SIL; Ret	THR; 15	EST	NÜR	VAL	PAU	SPA	DIJ	PER	ÖST	ZAN	DON	NC	0
1986	BS Automotive	Lola T86/50	Cosworth	SIL	VAL	PAU	SPA	IMO	MUG; 9	PER; 5	ÖST; Ret	BIR; Ret	BUG; 6	JAR; 12		17th	3
1987	First Racing	March 87B	Cosworth	SIL	VAL	SPA	PAU	DON; DNQ	PER; Ret	BRH; Ret	BIR; 10	IMO	BUG	JAR; Ret		NC	0
1988	GA Motorsports	Lola T88/50	Cosworth	JER; 7	VAL; Ret	PAU; 10	SIL; Ret	MNZ; 5	PER; 4	BRH; Ret	BIR; Ret	BUG; Ret	ZOL; 10			15th	5
1988	Barcelona Motorsport	Lola T88/50	Cosworth											DIJ; Ret		15th	5
1989	Forti Corse	Lola T89/50	Cosworth	SIL; 12	VAL; Ret	PAU; Ret	JER; 7	PER; 2	BRH; 6	BIR; 9	SPA; 15	BUG; 9	DIJ; 7			12th	7

=== Complete Formula One results ===
(key) (Races in bold indicate pole position; races in italics indicate fastest lap)

Year	Entrant	Chassis	Engine	1	2	3	4	5	6	7	8	9	10	11	12	13	14	15	16	WDC	Pts
1990	EuroBrun Racing	EuroBrun ER189	Judd CV 3.5 V8	USA; DNPQ	BRA; DNPQ															NC	0
1990	EuroBrun Racing	EuroBrun ER189B	Judd CV 3.5 V8			SMR; DNPQ	MON; DNPQ	CAN; DNPQ	MEX; DNPQ	FRA; DNPQ	GBR; DNPQ	GER; DNPQ	HUN; DNPQ	BEL; DNPQ	ITA; DNPQ	POR; DNPQ	ESP; DNPQ	JPN	AUS	NC	0
