= 1990 San Marino Grand Prix =

- Race 3 of 16 in the 1990 Formula One World Championship
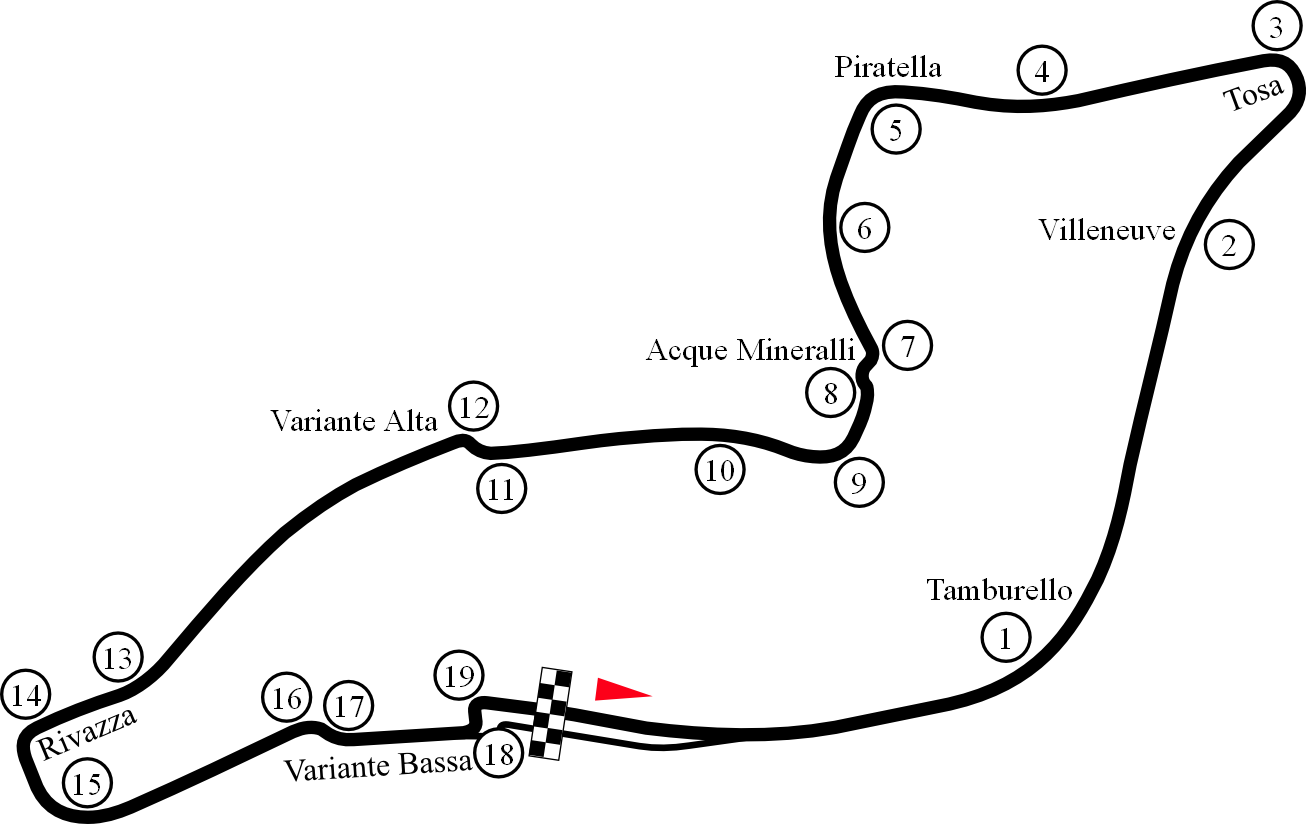

Race details
- Date: 13 May 1990
- Official name: 10^{o} Gran Premio di San Marino
- Location: Autodromo Enzo e Dino Ferrari; Imola, Emilia-Romagna, Italy
- Course: Permanent racing facility
- Course length: 5.040 km (3.132 miles)
- Distance: 61 laps, 307.44 km (191.034 miles)
- Weather: Warm, dry, sunny

Pole position
Driver	(Brazil) Ayrton Senna	McLaren-Honda
- Time: 1:23.220

Fastest lap
Driver	(Italy) Alessandro Nannini	Benetton-Ford
- Time: 1:27.156 on lap 60

Podium
First	(Italy) Riccardo Patrese	Williams-Renault
Second	(Austria) Gerhard Berger	McLaren-Honda
Third	(Italy) Alessandro Nannini	Benetton-Ford

The 1990 San Marino Grand Prix (formally the 10^{o} Gran Premio di San Marino) was a Formula One motor race held on 13 May 1990 at Imola. It was the third race of the 1990 Formula One World Championship and the first race in the European continent. The race was held over 61 laps of the 5.04-kilometre (3.13 mi) circuit for a race distance of 307.44 kilometres (191.03 mi).

The race was won by Italian driver Riccardo Patrese, driving a Williams-Renault. It was Patrese's third Grand Prix victory, and his first since the 1983 South African Grand Prix. As of 2025 Patrese holds the record for the longest waiting period between two Grand Prix wins, at 6 years, 6 months and 28 days. The record of most Grands Prix between wins was also broken and would be retained by Patrese until the 2018 United States Grand Prix when Kimi Räikkönen took the record. Patrese was also the most recent Italian driver to win on home soil until Kimi Antonelli won the 2026 Italian Grand Prix. Completing the podium was Austrian driver Gerhard Berger in second in a McLaren-Honda, and Patrese's compatriot Alessandro Nannini third in a Benetton-Ford.

== Background ==
In the run-up to the first European race of the 1990 World Championship, there were a few changes to the grid. Brabham replaced Swiss driver Gregor Foitek with Australian driver David Brabham, the youngest son of team founder Sir Jack Brabham. Foitek moved over to the troubled Onyx team (part-run by his father Karl), replacing Stefan Johansson, who was unhappy at the way the team was being run. David Brabham's older brother Gary had quit the Life team, describing it as "totally disorganised and unprofessional", and had been replaced by Italian veteran Bruno Giacomelli, who had last raced in F1 in 1983. Meanwhile, Emanuele Pirro returned to the Dallara team, having missed the first two races of the season due to hepatitis. Several teams unveiled new cars, with the Tyrrell 019 – designed by Harvey Postlethwaite – drawing much attention as the first F1 car to sport a "high-nose" design with downward-extending supports for the front wing.

== Qualifying ==
=== Pre-qualifying report ===
The Friday morning pre-qualifying session took shape very soon into the one-hour session, after both AGS cars dropped out almost immediately. The team had brought their new JH25 car to this race, but Yannick Dalmas was withdrawn due to a hand injury he suffered in a testing accident, and Gabriele Tarquini's car failed on its first lap with a fuel pressure issue. This left seven cars in the session, three of which were uncompetitive.

The Larrousse-Lola team also brought a new car to the Grand Prix, the LC90. As at the previous race in Brazil, they finished first and second, with Éric Bernard nearly a second faster than his team-mate Aguri Suzuki. The updated Osella FA1ME of Olivier Grouillard was third fastest, a fraction ahead of Roberto Moreno in the EuroBrun.

Apart from the AGS cars, the other runners who failed to pre-qualify included Bertrand Gachot in the Coloni, which, despite revised aerodynamics and a 23 kg weight reduction, was still seven seconds away from Bernard's time. Even slower was Claudio Langes in the other EuroBrun, down in sixth place. At the Life team, Bruno Giacomelli drove the L190 for the first time, having replaced Gary Brabham. A drivebelt failed on the Italian's very slow first lap, and the car did not reappear for the rest of the session.

=== Pre-qualifying classification ===
Pos	No	Driver	Constructor	Time	Gap
1	29	(France) Éric Bernard	Lola-Lamborghini	1:26.475	—
2	30	(Japan) Aguri Suzuki	Lola-Lamborghini	1:27.344	+0.869
3	14	(France) Olivier Grouillard	Osella-Ford	1:28.155	+1.680
4	33	(Brazil) Roberto Moreno	EuroBrun-Judd	1:28.178	+1.703
5	31	(Belgium) Bertrand Gachot	Coloni-Subaru	1:33.554	+7.079
6	34	(Italy) Claudio Langes	EuroBrun-Judd	1:34.272	+7.797
7	39	(Italy) Bruno Giacomelli	Life	7:16.212	+5:49.737
8	17	(Italy) Gabriele Tarquini	AGS-Ford	no time	—
9	18	(France) Yannick Dalmas	AGS-Ford	no time	—

=== Qualifying report ===
In practice, Benetton's Alessandro Nannini and Minardi's Pierluigi Martini both crashed heavily, Martini cracking his heel and withdrawing from the race as a result.

In the qualifying sessions, the McLarens filled the front row, with Ayrton Senna on pole and team-mate Gerhard Berger alongside him. The two Williams were on the second row with Riccardo Patrese ahead of Thierry Boutsen, while the two Ferraris made up the third row, Nigel Mansell ahead of Alain Prost. The top ten was completed by the Tyrrell of Jean Alesi, the Benettons of Nelson Piquet and Nannini, and the Lotus of Derek Warwick.

=== Qualifying classification ===
Pos	No	Driver	Constructor	Q1	Q2	Gap
1	27	(Brazil) Ayrton Senna	McLaren-Honda	1:24.079	1:23.220	—
2	28	(Austria) Gerhard Berger	McLaren-Honda	1:24.027	1:23.781	+0.561
3	6	(Italy) Riccardo Patrese	Williams-Renault	1:24.486	1:24.444	+1.224
4	5	(Belgium) Thierry Boutsen	Williams-Renault	1:25.832	1:25.039	+1.819
5	2	(United Kingdom) Nigel Mansell	Ferrari	1:25.539	1:25.095	+1.875
6	1	(France) Alain Prost	Ferrari	1:26.080	1:25.179	+1.959
7	4	(France) Jean Alesi	Tyrrell-Ford	1:26.138	1:25.230	+2.010
8	20	(Brazil) Nelson Piquet	Benetton-Ford	1:26.316	1:25.761	+2.541
9	19	(Italy) Alessandro Nannini	Benetton-Ford	1:26.889	1:26.042	+2.822
10	11	(United Kingdom) Derek Warwick	Lotus-Lamborghini	1:28.055	1:26.682	+3.462
11	12	(United Kingdom) Martin Donnelly	Lotus-Lamborghini	1:27.151	1:26.714	+3.494
12	15	(Brazil) Maurício Gugelmin	Leyton House-Judd	1:29.339	1:26.836	+3.616
13	29	(France) Éric Bernard	Lola-Lamborghini	1:26.988	1:26.838	+3.618
14	8	(Italy) Stefano Modena	Brabham-Judd	1:28.763	1:27.008	+3.788
15	30	(Japan) Aguri Suzuki	Lola-Lamborghini	1:27.211	1:27.068	+3.848
16	26	(France) Philippe Alliot	Ligier-Ford	1:27.533	1:27.214	+3.994
17	22	(Italy) Andrea de Cesaris	Dallara-Ford	1:27.570	1:27.217	+3.997
18	16	(Italy) Ivan Capelli	Leyton House-Judd	1:29.904	1:27.521	+4.301
19	3	(Japan) Satoru Nakajima	Tyrrell-Ford	1:27.746	1:27.532	+4.312
20	25	(Italy) Nicola Larini	Ligier-Ford	1:27.642	1:27.564	+4.344
21	21	(Italy) Emanuele Pirro	Dallara-Ford	1:27.849	1:27.613	+4.393
22	14	(France) Olivier Grouillard	Osella-Ford	1:28.590	1:28.009	+4.789
23	35	(Switzerland) Gregor Foitek	Onyx-Ford	1:28.111	1:28.435	+4.891
24	33	(Brazil) Roberto Moreno	EuroBrun-Judd	1:28.603	1:31.653	+5.383
25	36	(Finland) JJ Lehto	Onyx-Ford	1:28.625	no time	+5.405
26	24	(Italy) Paolo Barilla	Minardi-Ford	1:29.566	1:28.667	+5.447
27	10	(Italy) Alex Caffi	Arrows-Ford	1:29.242	1:28.699	+5.479
28	9	(Italy) Michele Alboreto	Arrows-Ford	1:29.615	1:28.797	+5.577
29	7	(Australia) David Brabham	Brabham-Judd	1:31.282	1:28.927	+5.707
WD	23	(Italy) Pierluigi Martini	Minardi-Ford	1:26.466	no time	+3.246

== Race ==
=== Race report ===
Pirro, who had qualified 21st, started from the back of the grid after his Dallara stalled at the start of the formation lap. At the start, Senna led away from Berger while Boutsen got ahead of Patrese. At Tamburello, Mansell ran wide and kicked up dust, which caused the Leyton House of Ivan Capelli and the second Tyrrell of Satoru Nakajima to collide with each other, while at Tosa Martin Donnelly spun his Lotus, narrowly avoiding other drivers. Meanwhile, Boutsen got past Berger but was unable to close on Senna. The order remained the same until lap 3 when Senna pulled off with a broken wheel rim, allowing Boutsen to take the lead with Berger close behind. Further back, Alesi collided with Piquet at Tosa; both drivers continued.

Boutsen led until his Renault engine blew on lap 17, which left Berger ahead of Patrese and Mansell. The Englishman passed Patrese going into Tosa, much to the delight of the Italian fans. Mansell continued to charge, despite being hit by Andrea de Cesaris while trying to lap him and challenged Berger for the lead. On the run up to Villeneuve, Mansell tried to go around the outside, but Berger pushed Mansell onto the grass, causing Mansell to spin dramatically. The Englishman avoided hitting anything and ended up pointing in the right direction, he continued in second place, however, dirt and debris had entered Mansell's engine, causing it to overheat and blow-up a few laps later.

Mansell's demise left Berger ahead of Patrese, who went through into the lead on lap 51. Nannini and Prost battled over third place, with Nannini winning out. Patrese duly won his first race since the 1983 South African Grand Prix, leading home Berger, Nannini, Prost, Piquet, and Alesi. With 98 races between victories, Patrese claimed the record for most starts between wins - a record that would be taken 28 years later by Kimi Räikkönen, who started 113 races between winning the 2013 Australian Grand Prix and the 2018 United States Grand Prix.

For Patrese this was also a significant win coming 7 years after he had failed to secure victory in the 1983 San Marino Grand Prix while driving a Brabham-BMW. On that occasion he had passed the Ferrari of Patrick Tambay for the lead 6 laps from the end, only to reliquinsh it less than half a lap later by crashing into the tyre barriers after going off at Acque Minerali. On this occasion after taking the lead he made no such mistake and went on to take just his 3rd Grand Prix win in his then record 195th Grand Prix start.

=== Race classification ===
Pos	No	Driver	Constructor	Laps	Time/Retired	Grid	Points
1	6	(Italy) Riccardo Patrese	Williams-Renault	61	1:30:55.478	3	9
2	28	(Austria) Gerhard Berger	McLaren-Honda	61	+ 5.117	2	6
3	19	(Italy) Alessandro Nannini	Benetton-Ford	61	+ 6.240	9	4
4	1	(France) Alain Prost	Ferrari	61	+ 6.843	6	3
5	20	(Brazil) Nelson Piquet	Benetton-Ford	61	+ 53.112	8	2
6	4	(France) Jean Alesi	Tyrrell-Ford	60	+ 1 lap	7	1
7	11	(United Kingdom) Derek Warwick	Lotus-Lamborghini	60	+ 1 lap	10	
8	12	(United Kingdom) Martin Donnelly	Lotus-Lamborghini	60	+ 1 lap	11	
9	26	(France) Philippe Alliot	Ligier-Ford	60	+ 1 lap	16	
10	25	(Italy) Nicola Larini	Ligier-Ford	59	+ 2 laps	20	
11	24	(Italy) Paolo Barilla	Minardi-Ford	59	+ 2 laps	26	
12	36	(Finland) JJ Lehto	Onyx-Ford	59	+ 2 laps	25	
13	29	(France) Éric Bernard	Lola-Lamborghini	56	Clutch	13	
Ret	14	(France) Olivier Grouillard	Osella-Ford	52	Wheel	22	
Ret	2	(United Kingdom) Nigel Mansell	Ferrari	38	Engine	5	
Ret	35	(Switzerland) Gregor Foitek	Onyx-Ford	35	Engine	23	
Ret	8	(Italy) Stefano Modena	Brabham-Judd	31	Brakes	14	
Ret	22	(Italy) Andrea de Cesaris	Dallara-Ford	29	Wheel	17	
Ret	15	(Brazil) Maurício Gugelmin	Leyton House-Judd	24	Electrical	12	
Ret	5	(Belgium) Thierry Boutsen	Williams-Renault	17	Engine	4	
Ret	30	(Japan) Aguri Suzuki	Lola-Lamborghini	17	Clutch	15	
Ret	27	(Brazil) Ayrton Senna	McLaren-Honda	3	Wheel	1	
Ret	21	(Italy) Emanuele Pirro	Dallara-Ford	2	Spun off	21	
Ret	16	(Italy) Ivan Capelli	Leyton House-Judd	0	Collision	18	
Ret	3	(Japan) Satoru Nakajima	Tyrrell-Ford	0	Collision	19	
Ret	33	(Brazil) Roberto Moreno	EuroBrun-Judd	0	Throttle	24	
DNS	23	(Italy) Pierluigi Martini	Minardi-Ford		Practice accident		
DNQ	10	(Italy) Alex Caffi	Arrows-Ford				
DNQ	9	(Italy) Michele Alboreto	Arrows-Ford				
DNQ	7	(Australia) David Brabham	Brabham-Judd				
DNPQ	31	(Belgium) Bertrand Gachot	Coloni-Subaru				
DNPQ	34	(Italy) Claudio Langes	EuroBrun-Judd				
DNPQ	39	(Italy) Bruno Giacomelli	Life				
DNPQ	17	(Italy) Gabriele Tarquini	AGS-Ford				
DNPQ	18	(France) Yannick Dalmas	AGS-Ford				

== Championship standings after the race ==
Drivers' Championship standings

Pos	Driver	Points
1	(Brazil) Ayrton Senna	13
2	(France) Alain Prost	12
3	(Austria) Gerhard Berger	12
4	(Italy) Riccardo Patrese	9
5	(France) Jean Alesi	7

Constructors' Championship standings

Pos	Constructor	Points
1	(United Kingdom) McLaren-Honda	25
2	(United Kingdom) Williams-Renault	15
3	(Italy) Ferrari	15
4	(United Kingdom) Benetton-Ford	10
5	(United Kingdom) Tyrrell-Ford	8

- Note: Only the top five positions are included for both sets of standings.

Previous race: 1990 Brazilian Grand Prix	FIA Formula One World Championship; 1990 season	Next race: 1990 Monaco Grand Prix
Previous race: 1989 San Marino Grand Prix	San Marino Grand Prix	Next race: 1991 San Marino Grand Prix
