= 1989 Italian Grand Prix =

- Race 12 of 16 in the 1989 Formula One World Championship
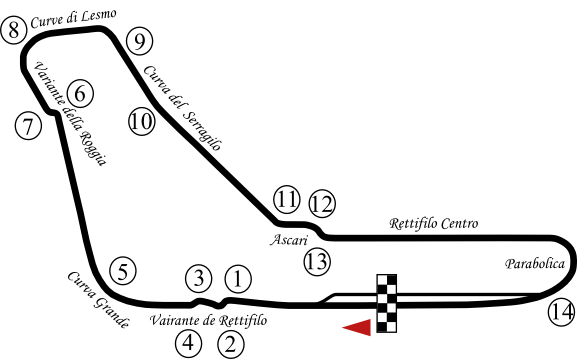

Race details
- Date: 10 September 1989
- Official name: LX Coca-Cola Gran Premio d'Italia
- Location: Autodromo Nazionale di Monza; Milan, Italy
- Course: Permanent racing facility
- Course length: 5.80 km (3.6039 miles)
- Distance: 53 laps, 307.400 km (191.009 miles)
- Weather: Hot, dry, sunny

Pole position
Driver	(Brazil) Ayrton Senna	McLaren-Honda
- Time: 1:23.720

Fastest lap
Driver	(France) Alain Prost	McLaren-Honda
- Time: 1:28.107 on lap 43

Podium
First	(France) Alain Prost	McLaren-Honda
Second	(Austria) Gerhard Berger	Ferrari
Third	(Belgium) Thierry Boutsen	Williams-Renault

The 1989 Italian Grand Prix was a Formula One motor race held at Monza on 10 September 1989. It was the twelfth race of the 1989 Formula One season.

Alain Prost took his fourth and final win of the season after McLaren teammate and pole-sitter Ayrton Senna suffered an engine failure with nine laps to go, thus extending the Frenchman's lead over the Brazilian in the Drivers' Championship to 20 points. Having earlier announced that he was moving to Ferrari for 1990, Prost dropped his winners' trophy from the podium into the crowd, to the severe disapproval of his team manager Ron Dennis. Gerhard Berger, the man Prost would be replacing at Ferrari, recorded his first finish of the season with second, followed by the two Williams of Thierry Boutsen and Riccardo Patrese. The final points went to Jean Alesi in the Tyrrell and Martin Brundle in the Brabham.

== Pre-race ==
Before the Italian Grand Prix, Alain Prost announced that he had signed with Ferrari for the upcoming 1990 season. To the Tifosi who had previously seen Prost as the villain, he was now the hero of the crowd. It mattered not that he was still driving for McLaren, he was a confirmed Ferrari driver now and was treated as such (in previous years he had been jostled, jeered, and even pelted with tomatoes by some of the Tifosi for daring to beat the Ferraris).

Prost's announcement allowed Frank Williams to re-sign Riccardo Patrese for 1990 (Prost had offers from both Ferrari and Williams). Lotus also announced at the Grand Prix that they would be using the Lamborghini V12 engine in 1990. They also confirmed that their 1990 drivers would be Derek Warwick and the team’s test driver Martin Donnelly. For his part, Piquet claimed after the press conference that his reason for leaving Lotus was his belief that although it had potential, the under-developed and underpowered Lamborghini V12 wouldn't be competitive and at that stage of his career he didn't want to spend another season developing an engine like he had done with the BMW turbo back in 1982. History would prove him correct with Lotus only scoring 3 points in 1990. Piquet on the other hand would link with Benetton and their exclusive Ford HB V8 engines for 1990 and would ultimately finish 3rd in the championship with 2 wins and 43 points.

== Qualifying ==
=== Pre-qualifying report ===
For the first time in six Grands Prix, Onyx were not fastest in pre-qualifying. That credit went to Larrousse-Lola, as their cars were first and second on Friday morning, with Philippe Alliot ahead of Michele Alboreto. Third was Nicola Larini in the Osella, with Bertrand Gachot's Onyx fourth. Gachot's team-mate and once a hero of the Tifosi as a Ferrari driver in 1985 and 1986 Stefan Johansson, missed out in fifth.

Sixth was the AGS of Gabriele Tarquini, with Roberto Moreno's Coloni seventh. Eighth was Larini's Osella team-mate Piercarlo Ghinzani, his eleventh pre-qualifying failure this season. As at the previous meeting, the Zakspeeds were ninth and tenth, Bernd Schneider again ahead of Aguri Suzuki. Argentine Oscar Larrauri had returned to EuroBrun for whom he raced in 1988, replacing Swiss driver Gregor Foitek, but with no improvement down in eleventh. Twelfth was the other AGS of Yannick Dalmas, ahead only of the second Coloni of Enrico Bertaggia.

=== Pre-qualifying classification ===
Pos	No	Driver	Constructor	Time	Gap
1	30	(France) Philippe Alliot	Lola-Lamborghini	1:26.623	—
2	29	(Italy) Michele Alboreto	Lola-Lamborghini	1:27.829	+1.206
3	17	(Italy) Nicola Larini	Osella-Ford	1:27.980	+1.357
4	37	(Belgium) Bertrand Gachot	Onyx-Ford	1:28.344	+1.721
5	36	(Sweden) Stefan Johansson	Onyx-Ford	1:28.588	+1.965
6	40	(Italy) Gabriele Tarquini	AGS-Ford	1:28.813	+2.190
7	31	(Brazil) Roberto Moreno	Coloni-Ford	1:28.864	+2.241
8	18	(Italy) Piercarlo Ghinzani	Osella-Ford	1:28.884	+2.261
9	34	(West Germany) Bernd Schneider	Zakspeed-Yamaha	1:29.472	+2.849
10	35	(Japan) Aguri Suzuki	Zakspeed-Yamaha	1:30.085	+3.462
11	33	(Argentina) Oscar Larrauri	EuroBrun-Judd	1:30.089	+3.466
12	41	(France) Yannick Dalmas	AGS-Ford	1:30.882	+4.259
13	32	(Italy) Enrico Bertaggia	Coloni-Ford	1:31.606	+4.983

=== Qualifying report ===
Predictably, the McLaren-Honda of Ayrton Senna was the fastest in qualifying for his 38th career pole position. Second was a surprise as Ferrari's Gerhard Berger joined Senna on the front row, whilst his teammate Nigel Mansell was third. Prost was only 4th, some 1.79 seconds slower than his Brazilian teammate, publicly complaining all weekend of a down on power engine compared to Senna's.

Prost's claims that Honda were favouring Senna were refuted by both Honda and McLaren boss Ron Dennis. However Prost's assertion was supported by former Honda drivers Mansell and 1982 World Champion Keke Rosberg who also told the press that when it became known they would not be driving Honda powered cars any more that their engines did not work as well or have as much power as was previous. BBC commentator Murray Walker also reported during the race itself that Prost was over 7 mph (11 km/h) slower than Senna through the speed trap in the race morning warm-up session despite the two cars running similar wing settings.

Senna's time of 1:23.720 in his V10 McLaren-Honda was 2.254 seconds faster than he had been a year earlier in the turbocharged McLaren MP4/4. His time was only 0.26 seconds shy of the fastest ever lap of the Monza circuit set by Nelson Piquet in a Williams-Honda in qualifying for the 1987 race when the turbo engines were developing some 300 bhp (224 kW; 304 PS) more than the naturally aspirated engines of 1989.

Eddie Cheever, who had finished 3rd in the 1988 race, failed to qualify his Arrows-Ford. It was the second time in 1989 that the American had failed to qualify for a race. His teammate Derek Warwick qualified 16th. The Brabham-Judd of Stefano Modena was excluded from the meeting when his car was found to be underweight. This promoted the Minardi of Luis Pérez-Sala onto the grid.

=== Qualifying classification ===
Pos	No	Driver	Constructor	Q1	Q2	Gap
1	1	(Brazil) Ayrton Senna	McLaren-Honda	1:25.021	1:23.720	—
2	28	(Austria) Gerhard Berger	Ferrari	1:24.734	1:24.998	+1.014
3	27	(United Kingdom) Nigel Mansell	Ferrari	1:24.739	1:24.979	+1.019
4	2	(France) Alain Prost	McLaren-Honda	1:25.872	1:25.510	+1.790
5	6	(Italy) Riccardo Patrese	Williams-Renault	1:26.195	1:25.545	+1.825
6	5	(Belgium) Thierry Boutsen	Williams-Renault	1:26.155	1:26.392	+2.435
7	30	(France) Philippe Alliot	Lola-Lamborghini	1:27.118	1:26.985	+3.265
8	19	(Italy) Alessandro Nannini	Benetton-Ford	1:27.162	1:27.052	+3.332
9	20	(Italy) Emanuele Pirro	Benetton-Ford	1:28.367	1:27.397	+3.677
10	4	(France) Jean Alesi	Tyrrell-Ford	—	1:27.399	+3.679
11	11	(Brazil) Nelson Piquet	Lotus-Judd	1:28.135	1:27.508	+3.788
12	7	(United Kingdom) Martin Brundle	Brabham-Judd	1:27.627	1:27.637	+3.907
13	29	(Italy) Michele Alboreto	Lola-Lamborghini	1:28.586	1:27.803	+4.083
14	3	(United Kingdom) Jonathan Palmer	Tyrrell-Ford	1:29.187	1:27.822	+4.102
15	23	(Italy) Pierluigi Martini	Minardi-Ford	1:28.397	1:27.923	+4.203
16	9	(United Kingdom) Derek Warwick	Arrows-Ford	1:28.092	1:29.031	+4.372
17	22	(Italy) Andrea de Cesaris	Dallara-Ford	1:28.129	1:28.180	+4.472
18	16	(Italy) Ivan Capelli	March-Judd	1:31.969	1:28.430	+4.710
19	12	(Japan) Satoru Nakajima	Lotus-Judd	1:28.769	1:28.441	+4.721
20	21	(Italy) Alex Caffi	Dallara-Ford	1:28.596	1:28.708	+4.876
21	26	(France) Olivier Grouillard	Ligier-Ford	1:28.669	1:29.537	+4.949
22	37	(Belgium) Bertrand Gachot	Onyx-Ford	1:28.684	1:29.058	+4.964
23	25	(France) René Arnoux	Ligier-Ford	1:28.685	1:28.843	+4.965
24	17	(Italy) Nicola Larini	Osella-Ford	1:29.265	1:28.773	+5.053
25	15	(Brazil) Maurício Gugelmin	March-Judd	1:29.192	1:28.923	+5.203
26	24	(Spain) Luis Pérez-Sala	Minardi-Ford	1:29.592	1:29.293	+5.573
27	10	(United States) Eddie Cheever	Arrows-Ford	1:29.884	1:29.554	+5.834
28	38	(West Germany) Christian Danner	Rial-Ford	1:32.074	1:31.830	+8.110
29	39	(France) Pierre-Henri Raphanel	Rial-Ford	—	1:36.295	+12.575
EX	8	(Italy) Stefano Modena	Brabham-Judd	—	—	—

== Race ==
=== Race report ===
As the grid was in the process of forming up before the start, the McLaren team transferred the settings from Senna's car to Prost's in the hope of curing its handling problem (Prost had actually been more than 2 seconds slower in the race morning warm up than Senna). Prost would later say that while handling and grip were significantly improved, the down on power engine remained and despite the same wing settings he still could not match his teammate for straight line speed.

Senna led from the start and built up a small lead over Berger, while Mansell (whose 'development' V12 engine was not revving right) and especially Prost struggled to stay in touch. Indeed, in the early stages of the race Prost, who was getting used to his cars new set up, was having a hard time holding off the V10 Williams-Renault of Thierry Boutsen, though the BBC's James Hunt explained that Prost was using a harder set of "B" compound tyres in the hope of not having to pit during the race.

Emanuele Pirro was the races first retirement, the transmission in his Benetton-Ford not lasting a single lap. Only just longer was the Lola-Lamborghini of Philippe Alliot. The V12 powered Lolas of Alliot and Michele Alboreto had easily been the fastest in pre-qualifying, and Alliot went on to qualify a fine 7th (ahead of the Benetton's) before spinning into the sand trap at Ascari on just his second lap.

Alessandro Nannini's Benetton lost its brakes on lap 33 putting him into retirement, while Nigel Mansell suffered gearbox failure on lap 41. Through all of this, Senna was still comfortably in the lead with Prost having fought his way past Berger into second following Mansell's retirement. Prost passed Berger in front of the pits and the main grandstand and this saw the unusual sight of the Tifosi cheering when a McLaren passed a Ferrari. It must be remembered though that Prost was a confirmed Ferrari driver for 1990 while Berger, the hero of the 1988 race, was leaving the Scuderia to take Prost's seat at McLaren. The Williams' pair of Boutsen and Patrese, having found the limits of the older FW12 model, were circulating in 4th and 5th places but at no stage threatened the leaders.

On lap 44 the roar of the crowd told the story as the V10 Honda in Senna's McLaren comprehensively blew up going into the Parabolica, dumping its oil onto the rear tyres and sending Senna into a gentle spin and retirement, handing Prost the lead which he held to win his first Italian Grand Prix since 1985. Berger finished second for not only his first points of the season but indeed his first race finish while Boutsen came home third. Despite Prost's engine complaints, he still managed to set the fastest lap of the race on lap 43.

Prost's win restored his 20-point championship lead over Senna with only four races remaining in the season. However, due to the "Best 11" scoring system, Prost had now scored major points in 11 races while Senna could still score from all four remaining races. This meant that unless Prost won races, he would be able to score only a small number of points for the remainder of the season while Senna could conceivably score a maximum of 36 points (and win the championship) if he won the last four rounds.

McLaren-Honda won the Constructors' Championship with four races left.

=== Race classification ===
Pos	No	Driver	Constructor	Laps	Time/Retired	Grid	Points
1	2	(France) Alain Prost	McLaren-Honda	53	1:19:27.550	4	9
2	28	(Austria) Gerhard Berger	Ferrari	53	+ 7.326	2	6
3	5	(Belgium) Thierry Boutsen	Williams-Renault	53	+ 14.975	6	4
4	6	(Italy) Riccardo Patrese	Williams-Renault	53	+ 38.722	5	3
5	4	(France) Jean Alesi	Tyrrell-Ford	52	+ 1 Lap	10	2
6	7	(United Kingdom) Martin Brundle	Brabham-Judd	52	+ 1 Lap	12	1
7	23	(Italy) Pierluigi Martini	Minardi-Ford	52	+ 1 Lap	15	
8	24	(Spain) Luis Pérez-Sala	Minardi-Ford	51	+ 2 Laps	26	
9	25	(France) René Arnoux	Ligier-Ford	51	+ 2 Laps	23	
10	12	(Japan) Satoru Nakajima	Lotus-Judd	51	Suspension	19	
11	21	(Italy) Alex Caffi	Dallara-Ford	47	Engine	20	
Ret	22	(Italy) Andrea de Cesaris	Dallara-Ford	45	Engine	17	
Ret	1	(Brazil) Ayrton Senna	McLaren-Honda	44	Engine	1	
Ret	27	(United Kingdom) Nigel Mansell	Ferrari	41	Gearbox	3	
Ret	37	(Belgium) Bertrand Gachot	Onyx-Ford	38	Radiator	22	
Ret	19	(Italy) Alessandro Nannini	Benetton-Ford	33	Brakes	8	
Ret	16	(Italy) Ivan Capelli	March-Judd	30	Engine	18	
Ret	26	(France) Olivier Grouillard	Ligier-Ford	30	Exhaust	21	
Ret	11	(Brazil) Nelson Piquet	Lotus-Judd	23	Spun Off	11	
Ret	3	(United Kingdom) Jonathan Palmer	Tyrrell-Ford	18	Engine	14	
Ret	9	(United Kingdom) Derek Warwick	Arrows-Ford	18	Fuel System	16	
Ret	17	(Italy) Nicola Larini	Osella-Ford	16	Gearbox	24	
Ret	29	(Italy) Michele Alboreto	Lola-Lamborghini	14	Electrical	13	
Ret	15	(Brazil) Maurício Gugelmin	March-Judd	14	Throttle	25	
Ret	30	(France) Philippe Alliot	Lola-Lamborghini	1	Spun Off	7	
Ret	20	(Italy) Emanuele Pirro	Benetton-Ford	0	Transmission	9	
DSQ	8	(Italy) Stefano Modena	Brabham-Judd				
DNQ	10	(United States) Eddie Cheever	Arrows-Ford				
DNQ	38	(West Germany) Christian Danner	Rial-Ford				
DNQ	39	(France) Pierre-Henri Raphanel	Rial-Ford				
DNPQ	36	(Sweden) Stefan Johansson	Onyx-Ford				
DNPQ	40	(Italy) Gabriele Tarquini	AGS-Ford				
DNPQ	31	(Brazil) Roberto Moreno	Coloni-Ford				
DNPQ	18	(Italy) Piercarlo Ghinzani	Osella-Ford				
DNPQ	34	(West Germany) Bernd Schneider	Zakspeed-Yamaha				
DNPQ	35	(Japan) Aguri Suzuki	Zakspeed-Yamaha				
DNPQ	33	(Argentina) Oscar Larrauri	EuroBrun-Judd				
DNPQ	41	(France) Yannick Dalmas	AGS-Ford				
DNPQ	32	(Italy) Enrico Bertaggia	Coloni-Ford				

== Championship standings after the race ==
- Bold Text indicates World Champions

Drivers' Championship standings

Pos	Driver	Points
1	(France) Alain Prost	71
2	(Brazil) Ayrton Senna	51
3	(United Kingdom) Nigel Mansell	38
4	(Italy) Riccardo Patrese	28
5	(Belgium) Thierry Boutsen	24

Constructors' Championship standings

Pos	Constructor	Points
1	(United Kingdom) McLaren-Honda	122
2	(United Kingdom) Williams-Renault	52
3	(Italy) Ferrari	44
4	(United Kingdom) Benetton-Ford	19
5	(United Kingdom) Tyrrell-Ford	12

- Note: Only the top five positions are included for both sets of standings.

Previous race: 1989 Belgian Grand Prix	FIA Formula One World Championship; 1989 season	Next race: 1989 Portuguese Grand Prix
Previous race: 1988 Italian Grand Prix	Italian Grand Prix	Next race: 1990 Italian Grand Prix
