= Life F190 =

Formula One car designed by Richard Divila and Gianni Marelli for the Life team

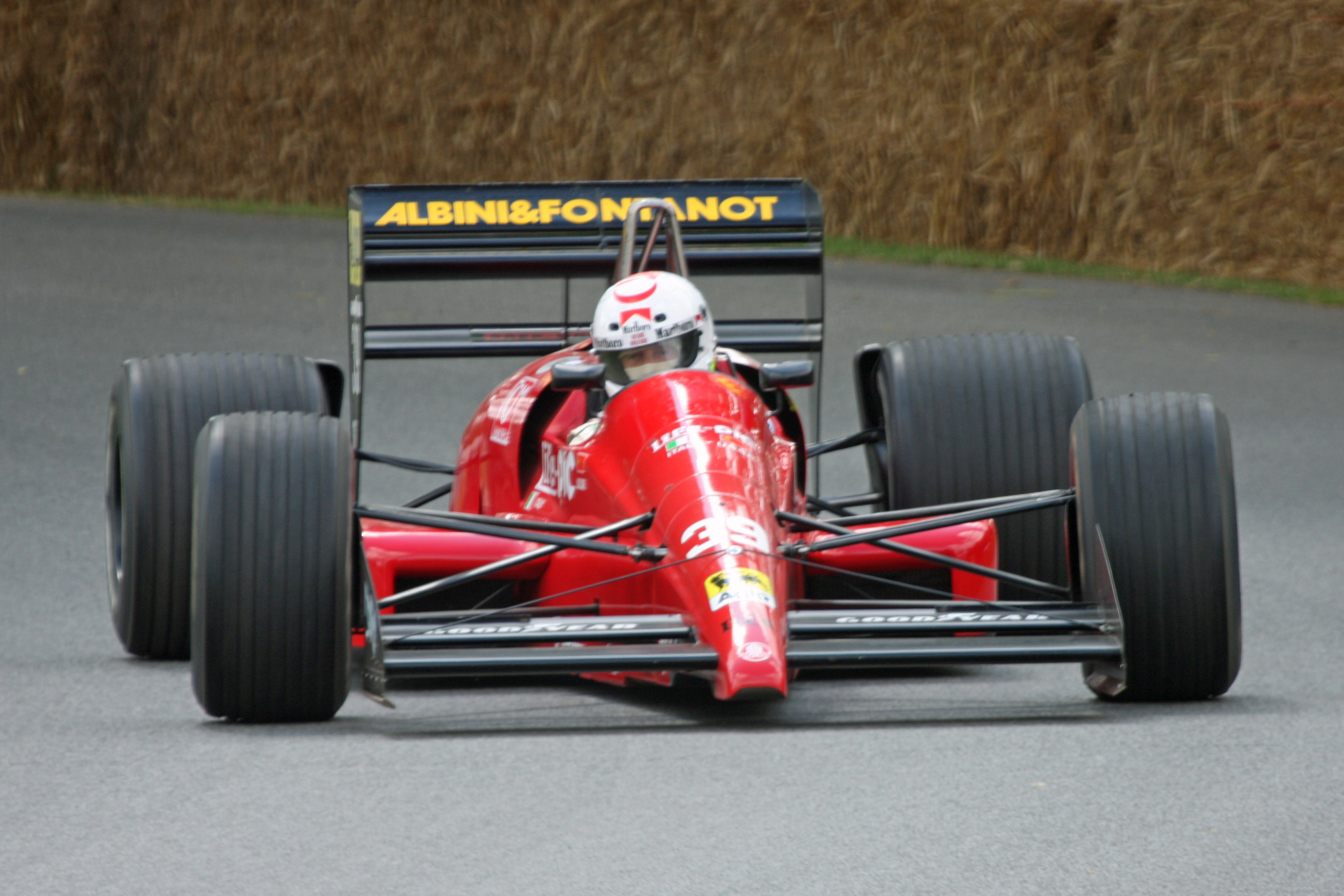
- Life F190 during the 2009 Goodwood Festival of Speed
- Category: Formula One
- Designers: Richard Divila; Gianni Marelli
- Production: First Racing; Life Racing Engines

Technical specifications
- Chassis: monocoque from carbon fibers
- Engine: Life F35 3.5 W12 (Rounds 1-12); Judd CV 3.5 V8 (Rounds 13-14)
- Transmission: Life/Hewland 6-speed + reverse manual
- Fuel: Agip
- Tires: Goodyear

Competition history
- Notable drivers: 39. (Australia) Gary Brabham; 39. (Italy) Bruno Giacomelli
- Debut: 1990 United States Grand Prix
Races	Wins	Poles	F/Laps
0	0	0	0

The Life F190, also known as Life L190, is a Formula One car designed by Richard Divila and Gianni Marelli for the Life team, which participated in 14 Grands Prix during the 1990 season before withdrawing after the Spanish Grand Prix. Initially driven by Gary Brabham, who was later replaced by Bruno Giacomelli, the car was essentially a repurposed First Racing chassis. It proved to be highly ineffective, with Life's drivers never managing to pre-qualify, often being significantly slower than their competitors. The team's attempt to use an unconventional W12 engine turned out to be particularly misguided.

== Concept ==
Engineer Franco Rocchi, who had been working at Scuderia Ferrari since 1949, left the company in 1980 to start developing a new racing engine with a W configuration. This was an unusual choice since V engines are typically used in major racing series. However, Rocchi was convinced of the viability of his idea. Theoretically, a W12 engine should be shorter and more flexible than a V12 engine. Rocchi's engine was completed by mid-1989, and Rocchi claimed that it weighed 140 kg, compared to the 155 kg Cosworth engines.

The late 1980s in Formula One saw a ban on turbocharged engines, leading teams using such engines to switch to naturally aspirated ones. Several new engine suppliers entered Formula One during this time, including Ilmor, Judd, Lamborghini, and Yamaha, while Carlo Chiti supplied underperforming Motori Moderni B12 engines to teams like Minardi and Scuderia Coloni. Meanwhile, Renault and Honda were developing V10 engines for Williams and McLaren, respectively.

In this context, Italian businessman Ernesto Vita became interested in Rocchi's engine. Hoping for a quick profit, Vita bought the rights to the W12 engine from Rocchi and tried to sell it to other teams. Vita believed that the unique engine would attract sponsors, but this did not happen, and most experts and international corporations doubted the engine's success. Vita then decided to establish the Life Racing Engines team and use the unconventional engine himself. The team's name, Life, came from the founder's surname, which means life in Italian.

=== First Racing ===
Vita decided not to build his own car but to use an existing one. To that end, he purchased a car from the First Racing team. First Racing, founded by former racing driver Lamberto Leoni, debuted in Formula 3000 in 1987, and in 1988, with drivers Pierluigi Martini and Marco Apicella, the team achieved good results. In 1989, Leoni planned to enter his team in Formula One. To design the car, Richard Divila, a former employee of teams like Fittipaldi Automotive, was hired. To keep costs down, the car was based on a Formula 3000 vehicle, the March 88B. However, during the development of the model, Divila left First Racing to join Équipe Ligier.

The FIRST F189, equipped with a Judd engine, was ready by the end of 1988 and was unveiled during the Memorial Attilio Bettega. Tests conducted by Gabriele Tarquini, who was set to drive for First Racing in 1989, revealed that the rolling chassis was poorly constructed and that the car was unsafe. Additionally, the car failed mandatory crash tests before the season, preventing First Racing from competing in Formula One. Divila told the First Racing management that the car was a time bomb, highlighting issues with the gearbox, suspension, chassis, and steering column, and warned potential drivers against driving the F189. He also took legal action to dissociate his name from the project, stating that the car would be good, but only as an interesting flowerpot.

Without money, a compliant car, or tires (Pirelli and Goodyear refused to supply them), Leoni abandoned plans to participate in Formula One and returned to Formula 3000.

== Engine and transmission ==
The Life W12 engine featured three rows of four cylinders each – two rows in a V configuration and one positioned vertically between them. This setup was unusual since W12 engines typically have four rows of three cylinders. Theoretically, this engine should have been as compact as a V8 while generating as much power as a V12. However, the Life W12 engine turned out to be a failure, producing only 470 bhp (350 kW; 477 PS) – over 200 bhp (149 kW; 203 PS) less than its competitors (some sources claim the Life engine produced just 360 bhp (268 kW; 365 PS) compared to the 700 bhp (522 kW; 710 PS) Honda V10 engine in McLarens). The engine, designated as the Life F35, was thus the weakest power unit in the 1990 season. Before the Portuguese Grand Prix, the Life engines were replaced with Judd V8 engines which produced around 600 bhp (447 kW; 608 PS).

The fuel-injected engine had five valves per cylinder and four camshafts.

The six-speed manual gearbox was developed by Life in collaboration with Hewland.

== Chassis and suspension ==
Vita purchased the FIRST F189 from Leoni and installed the Life W12 engine in it. Most of the mechanical work was carried out by Gianni Marelli. To pass crash tests, the roll bar was modified. The F190 model was, in essence, a fairly conventional and simple car. Its major drawback was its excessive weight: the Life F190 was the heaviest car on the grid. It featured a very narrow nose, resulting in minimal air resistance. The model was equipped with additional air intakes near the driver's arms. The car's side sections were very low, narrow, and thin. The shallow cockpit exposed the driver to danger, something Divila pointed out to the car's first driver, Gary Brabham, warning him about the risks of driving the car.

The carbon disc brakes were produced by Brembo/CI, and the shock absorbers were made by Koni.

== Testing ==
The initial driver for the team was British Formula 3000 champion Gary Brabham. The reserve and test driver was Franco Scapini, a former Formula 3000 driver and Minardi tester in 1987. However, since the team had only one car, Scapini had the opportunity to test the model only once. The first tests were scheduled for January 28 at the Misano World Circuit, but they did not take place. Eventually, the car was ready in February but was hardly tested at all. The first test took place on February 18 at the Vallelunga Circuit, with both Gary Brabham and Franco Scapini present. However, only Brabham drove the car, which briefly attracted sponsors (Agip, Beta, Nardi Borelli, and Albini & Fontanot).

The next test occurred on February 25 at the Monza Circuit; in total, only a few laps were completed during these tests. The F190 handled poorly, was slow, unreliable, and heavy, weighing from 25 to 30 kg more than other cars. Additionally, the team had only one chassis, two engines, and no spare parts.

== Racing ==
In the 1990 season, 19 teams fielded 35 cars, but the regulations allowed only 26 drivers to compete in each race, with 30 eligible for qualifying. The worst-performing teams had to go through pre-qualifying.

The season began on 11 March 1990 with the United States Grand Prix at the Phoenix street circuit. Gary Brabham posted a time of 2:07.147, nearly 30 seconds slower than Claudio Langes ahead of him, while pole-sitter Gerhard Berger's time was nearly 40 seconds faster. Ivan Capelli, who qualified last (26th) for the race, posted a time of 1:33.044. Derek Warwick recorded the top speed at the circuit with 271.44 km/h, while Brabham managed only 185.57 km/h. The car completed just two timed laps before the engine overheated.

During a press conference in Phoenix, Brabham revealed that the mechanics, who wanted to check the tire pressure, had to borrow a pressure gauge from the EuroBrun team. He also expressed concerns that the team might fold before the Brazilian Grand Prix. To help save the team, Brabham sought sponsors and contributed some of his own funds, as did Ernesto Vita, who invested an additional 3 million dollars into the team.

At the Brazilian Grand Prix, Brabham's car only managed 400 meters because the mechanics, striking due to unpaid wages, did not fill the engine with oil. Tensions soon arose between Brabham and Vita, with the Australian driver blaming the team's lack of professionalism and resources needed to repair the car after a connecting rod broke during the Brazilian Grand Prix. His manager, Don MacPherson, stated that Life's level of professionalism was not worthy of Formula One and that his client wanted to leave the Italian team.

Brabham recommended engineer Rony Salt, with whom he had worked in Formula 3000 at Bromley Motorsports, to Vita. He also suggested switching to Judd V8 engines. When Vita refused, Brabham left the team and moved to Formula 3000.

Vita initially wanted to hire Bernd Schneider as Brabham's replacement. Schneider debuted in Formula One in 1988 with Zakspeed and raced in the 1990 United States Grand Prix with the Arrows team. Schneider was present at the Brazilian Grand Prix, hoping a team would be interested in his services, and Vita made him an offer. However, after realizing how poor the F190 was, Schneider declined the offer and chose to compete in Group C with Kremer Racing, hoping that good performances would attract a better Formula One team.

In late April and early May, Gianni Marelli left the team, and Goodyear announced its intention to stop supplying tires to Life. Goodyear later reversed this decision, but Bernie Ecclestone, Vice President of the Fédération Internationale de l'Automobile (FIA), met with Vita and tried to dissuade him from continuing the team's participation in Formula One due to its limited financial resources and lack of competitiveness.

In search of a driver, Ernesto Vita contacted Franco Scapini, but he did not receive an FIA Super Licence. Vita again offered Schneider a contract, but he once again refused. The next candidate to drive for the team was Rob Wilson, a Barber Saab Pro Series driver and would-be Tyrrell driver in 1981. However, Vita eventually negotiated with Bruno Giacomelli, and Wilson feared becoming a reserve driver, expressing hope that he would drive for Life if the team fielded a second car. Ultimately, Vita hired Giacomelli, a former driver for McLaren, Alfa Romeo, and Toleman in Formula One, who raced from 1977 to 1983, participating in 83 Grands Prix and scoring 14 points, one pole position, and one podium. Giacomelli later admitted that he knew the car was very slow but missed the Formula One environment.

Vita also reached an agreement with Soviet businessman Mikhail Pichkovsky and sold 67% of the team to a wealthy industrialist from Verona, Daniele Battaglini. This was supposed to allow Vita to purchase Judd engines used in Brabhams and Lotuses, realizing the Life engine's significant power deficiencies.

During qualifying for the San Marino Grand Prix, Giacomelli's oil and water pump belt snapped, resulting in a top speed of 104.44 km/h (Riccardo Patrese reached 313.95 km/h). Only being able to select third gear, he finished qualifying with a best time of 7:16.212. Not taking into account the 1957 Pescara Grand Prix's 10-minute-on-average laps, this was also the slowest lap time ever recorded in Formula One history until Andrea Moda's Perry McCarthy set 17:05.924 during pre-qualifying for the 1992 Monaco Grand Prix. Giacomelli also admitted that he was afraid of being hit from behind because he was driving so slowly.

In qualifying for the Monaco Grand Prix, Giacomelli completed two consecutive timed laps for the first time that season without any issues. He reached a top speed of 213 km/h compared to Ayrton Senna's 272 km/h, and his time of 1:41.187 was over 15 seconds slower than 26th-placed JJ Lehto and slower than all Formula Three cars racing in a support event on the same track.

At the Canadian Grand Prix, Giacomelli's time of 1:50.253 was nearly half a minute slower than Ayrton Senna's. Giacomelli recorded the lowest top speed on the track – 216 km/h – while Nelson Piquet recorded the highest – 297 km/h. Marelli was replaced by former Zakspeed technical director Peter Wyss, who, though invited by Giacomelli, officially served as an advisor to help overcome the team's difficulties. Giacomelli contacted his former employer, Leyton House (for whom he tested a car in 1989), to purchase Judd engines prior to the Mexican Grand Prix, while Vita held talks with Brabham and Lotus. Life's sporting director Sergio Barbasio announced that the team had purchased Judd CV engines from Team Lotus and that its designers were working on developing the car to properly install the V8 engine in place of the W12.

In Mexico, Giacomelli posted a time of 4:04.475 and a top speed almost 200 km/h slower than fastest-on-track Satoru Nakajima. In qualifying for the French Grand Prix, Giacomelli did not complete a single timed lap and did not record a time. The Italian driver again placed last at the British Grand Prix with a time of 1:25.947, more than 14 seconds slower than Gabriele Tarquini before him. Giacomelli's time was three seconds faster than the Formula Three cars racing at Silverstone at the time.

Despite having a Judd engine, during the German Grand Prix, Barbasio revealed that Life mechanics had not had time to replace the Life engine with the Judd engine between two Grands Prix, and it was likely that the team would continue using the W12 engine for the rest of the season. Barbasio also revealed that he considered fielding a second car with a Judd engine, but the team lacked the funds to do so. In pre-qualifying, Giacomelli was 20 seconds slower than second-to-last Claudio Langes.

In the next three Grands Prix – Hungary, Belgium, and Italy – the team continued to use the Life engines, and Giacomelli continued to lose several seconds to the drivers ahead of him. In the Hungarian Grand Prix, he was 15 seconds behind second-to-last Langes, 18 seconds behind in the Belgian Grand Prix, and 20 seconds behind in the Italian Grand Prix. Giacomelli's time at the Italian Grand Prix was slower than all the Formula One cars from the 1969 season.

Before the Portuguese Grand Prix, the F190 was fitted with a Judd engine. The team spent 10 days rebuilding the car, as the chassis, bodywork, and engine mounts had to be modified; after these changes, the car was about 80 kg lighter. Giacomelli expressed hope that after the engine switch, his car would be able to reach 300 km/h. The final work on the engine installation took place at the Circuito do Estoril circuit just before the Portuguese Grand Prix, when it was discovered that the engine cover did not fit the Judd unit. Giacomelli failed to leave the pit lane due to an electrical system failure.

For the Spanish Grand Prix, the cover was fully adapted to the Judd engine, but mechanics had to lift the car by the suspension arms because the team did not bring a jack. Giacomelli's time was 1:42.699, while second-to-last Langes posted a time of 1:25.736.

Due to the high costs of traveling to the final two overseas Grands Prix (Japan and Australia), Life withdrew from them, for which they received a $200,000 fine from the FIA. Despite the team's poor results, Vita announced Life Racing Engines' participation in the 1991 season, stating that the W12 engine would continue to be developed to eventually compete with Judd V8 and Lamborghini V12 engines. He also announced an investment of 5 to 8 billion lire in the team and an increase in personnel. However, this never happened, and Life withdrew from Formula One after the 1990 season.

== Further fate of the model ==
The only model was sold to a private collector. In 2009, it was showcased with its original engine, which had been rebuilt by Lorenzo Prandina, at the Goodwood Festival of Speed, where it was driven by Derek Bell.

== Complete Formula One results ==
(key)

Year	Team	Engine(s)	Tyres	Drivers	1	2	3	4	5	6	7	8	9	10	11	12	13	14	15	16	Points	WCC
1990	Life Racing Engines	Life 3.5 W12	G		USA	BRA	SMR	MON	CAN	MEX	FRA	GBR	GER	HUN	BEL	ITA	POR	ESP	JPN	AUS	0	NC
1990	Life Racing Engines	Life 3.5 W12	G	(Australia) Gary Brabham	DNPQ	DNPQ															0	NC
1990	Life Racing Engines	Life 3.5 W12	G	(Italy) Bruno Giacomelli			DNPQ	DNPQ	DNPQ	DNPQ	DNPQ	DNPQ	DNPQ	DNPQ	DNPQ	DNPQ					0	NC
1990	Life Racing Engines	Judd 3.5 V8	G	(Italy) Bruno Giacomelli													DNPQ	DNPQ			0	NC
