= 1990 Belgian Grand Prix =

- Race 11 of 16 in the 1990 Formula One World Championship
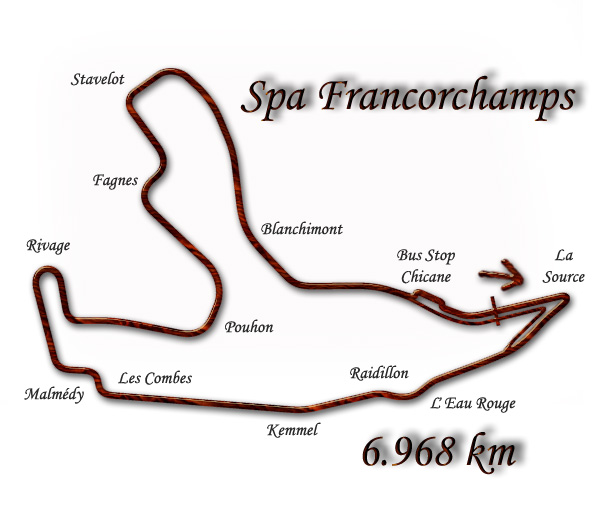

Race details
- Date: 26 August 1990
- Location: Circuit de Spa-Francorchamps; Francorchamps, Wallonia, Belgium
- Course: Permanent racing facility
- Course length: 6.940 km (4.312 miles)
- Distance: 44 laps, 301.172 km (187.136 miles)
- Weather: Dry

Pole position
Driver	(Brazil) Ayrton Senna	McLaren-Honda
- Time: 1:50.365

Fastest lap
Driver	(France) Alain Prost	Ferrari
- Time: 1:55.087 on lap 38

Podium
First	(Brazil) Ayrton Senna	McLaren-Honda
Second	(France) Alain Prost	Ferrari
Third	(Austria) Gerhard Berger	McLaren-Honda

The 1990 Belgian Grand Prix was a Formula One motor race held at Spa-Francorchamps on 26 August 1990. It was the eleventh race of the 1990 Formula One World Championship. The race was the 48th Belgian Grand Prix. It was the 36th to be held at Spa-Francorchamps and the seventh since the circuit was extensively redeveloped in 1979. The race was held over 44 laps of the seven kilometre circuit for a race distance of 301 kilometres.

Brazilian driver Ayrton Senna claimed his fifth race victory for the season in his McLaren MP4/5B taking a four-second win over the Ferrari 641 driven the reigning world champion, Frenchman Alain Prost. It was Senna's fourth victory in the Belgian Grand Prix, and his third in succession. Senna's Austrian teammate Gerhard Berger finished third, while further back Maurício Gugelmin scored a point for the Leyton House team.

Three attempts were made to start the race, the first two being red-flagged after collisions. Aguri Suzuki's Lola LC90 was eliminated after the first start, Paolo Barilla's Minardi M190 after the second.

Off-track, Nigel Mansell was rumoured to be reconsidering his prior announcement to retire, and he was strongly linked with Williams. He had demanded undisputed number one status as a driver, and various assurances from engine supplier Renault, which Frank Williams had told him were impossible.

The Onyx team pulled out of Formula One before the weekend of the race, for financial reasons, having competed at this level for a season and a half.

== Qualifying ==
=== Pre-qualifying report ===
With the withdrawal of the Onyx team, Ligier were relieved of the requirement to pre-qualify, and returned to the main qualifying pool. They had only been required to pre-qualify twice, which both cars did comfortably on both occasions.

Therefore, there was slightly less pressure on the other entrants in the pre-qualifying session. Olivier Grouillard was fastest in the Osella, the second time he had been top of the Friday morning time sheets, and the first time since round six in Mexico. Second fastest was Yannick Dalmas in the AGS, his fifth successful pre-qualification of the season from eleven attempts. Third fastest was Bertrand Gachot in the improving Coloni, and this was the first time in 1990 that he had pre-qualified. Fourth was Gabriele Tarquini in the other AGS, his fourth pre-qualification this season.

Missing the cut in fifth and sixth positions were the EuroBruns of Roberto Moreno and Claudio Langes. The margin of failure was fairly narrow however, with Moreno 0.36 seconds behind Tarquini, and Langes just over a second further behind. Bruno Giacomelli was slowest again in the Life, with the L190 refusing to start until the closing stages of the session. The car managed five slow laps before an electrical failure. "Nothing impressive," Giacomelli stated. He also announced that work was restarting on the chassis to allow a Judd CV V8 engine to be fitted by round 13 in Portugal, in place of the disastrous in-house W12.

=== Pre-qualifying classification ===
Pos	No	Driver	Constructor	Time	Gap
1	14	(France) Olivier Grouillard	Osella-Ford	1:57.941	—
2	18	(France) Yannick Dalmas	AGS-Ford	1:58.339	+0.398
3	31	(Belgium) Bertrand Gachot	Coloni-Ford	1:59.130	+1.189
4	17	(Italy) Gabriele Tarquini	AGS-Ford	1:59.910	+1.969
5	33	(Brazil) Roberto Moreno	EuroBrun-Judd	2:00.270	+2.329
6	34	(Italy) Claudio Langes	EuroBrun-Judd	2:01.405	+3.464
7	39	(Italy) Bruno Giacomelli	Life	2:19.445	+21.504

=== Qualifying report ===
The two McLarens were on the front row, with Senna ahead of Berger. Prost in the Ferrari was third ahead of Boutsen and the second Ferrari of Mansell.

=== Qualifying classification ===
Pos	No	Driver	Constructor	Q1	Q2	Gap
1	27	(Brazil) Ayrton Senna	McLaren-Honda	1:52.278	1:50.365	—
2	28	(Austria) Gerhard Berger	McLaren-Honda	1:51.211	1:50.948	+0.583
3	1	(France) Alain Prost	Ferrari	1:51.841	1:51.043	+0.678
4	5	(Belgium) Thierry Boutsen	Williams-Renault	1:54.024	1:51.902	+1.537
5	2	(United Kingdom) Nigel Mansell	Ferrari	1:52.601	1:52.267	+1.902
6	19	(Italy) Alessandro Nannini	Benetton-Ford	1:55.800	1:52.648	+2.283
7	6	(Italy) Riccardo Patrese	Williams-Renault	1:54.260	1:52.703	+2.338
8	20	(Brazil) Nelson Piquet	Benetton-Ford	1:53.689	1:52.853	+2.488
9	4	(France) Jean Alesi	Tyrrell-Ford	1:54.116	1:52.885	+2.520
10	3	(Japan) Satoru Nakajima	Tyrrell-Ford	1:55.798	1:53.468	+3.103
11	30	(Japan) Aguri Suzuki	Lola-Lamborghini	1:55.294	1:53.523	+3.158
12	16	(Italy) Ivan Capelli	Leyton House-Judd	1:55.012	1:53.783	+3.418
13	8	(Italy) Stefano Modena	Brabham-Judd	1:57.014	1:53.916	+3.551
14	15	(Brazil) Maurício Gugelmin	Leyton House-Judd	1:54.497	1:54.120	+3.755
15	29	(France) Éric Bernard	Lola-Lamborghini	1:56.213	1:54.251	+3.886
16	23	(Italy) Pierluigi Martini	Minardi-Ford	1:56.074	1:54.312	+3.947
17	21	(Italy) Emanuele Pirro	Dallara-Ford	1:56.239	1:54.595	+4.230
18	11	(United Kingdom) Derek Warwick	Lotus-Lamborghini	1:56.246	1:55.068	+4.703
19	10	(Italy) Alex Caffi	Arrows-Ford	1:56.562	1:55.199	+4.834
20	22	(Italy) Andrea de Cesaris	Dallara-Ford	1:56.923	1:55.261	+4.896
21	25	(Italy) Nicola Larini	Ligier-Ford	1:57.471	1:55.278	+4.913
22	12	(United Kingdom) Martin Donnelly	Lotus-Lamborghini	1:56.666	1:55.304	+4.939
23	14	(France) Olivier Grouillard	Osella-Ford	1:57.770	1:55.334	+4.969
24	7	(Australia) David Brabham	Brabham-Judd	1:58.034	1:55.668	+5.303
25	24	(Italy) Paolo Barilla	Minardi-Ford	1:57.221	1:55.859	+5.494
26	9	(Italy) Michele Alboreto	Arrows-Ford	1:57.255	1:56.055	+5.690
27	26	(France) Philippe Alliot	Ligier-Ford	no time	1:56.118	+5.753
28	17	(Italy) Gabriele Tarquini	AGS-Ford	1:58.293	1:57.566	+7.201
29	18	(France) Yannick Dalmas	AGS-Ford	1:58.995	1:57.704	+7.339
30	31	(Belgium) Bertrand Gachot	Coloni-Ford	no time	1:58.520	+8.155

== Race ==
=== Race report ===
The first start had seen two incidents. The first of them saw Nelson Piquet in the Benetton push the Ferrari 641 of Nigel Mansell off the track. In the second of the incidents, the Tyrrell of Satoru Nakajima collided with the Brabham of Stefano Modena, which caused the race to be stopped.

The second start had seen Senna's McLaren take the lead with the Williams of Thierry Boutsen slicing his way into second place from fourth, whilst rival Alain Prost had dropped down to fifth place after starting third. However, there was another first lap accident when the Minardi of Paolo Barilla crashed heavily at Eau Rouge, leaving debris all over the track in that area and causing the race to be stopped again.

The third start, however, had proven to be cleaner, as Senna held on to the lead ahead of teammate Gerhard Berger, Prost, Boutsen, Patrese and Alessandro Nannini in the leading Benetton. Mansell in the second Ferrari went into the pits on lap 11 with handling problems. He was able to rejoin the race but retired eight laps later. Meanwhile, back up front, Prost took second ahead of Berger but then pitted for tyres. The margin between Senna and Prost was only two seconds when they made their second pit stops for fresh tyres. Both the Williams cars of Patrese and Boutsen were soon forced to retire with gearbox problems by lap 22. The pit stops of Senna and Prost had allowed Nannini (who was once again planning to go the full race distance without a pit stop) to take second place. Prost was able to overtake Nannini and Berger attempted to do the same thing but was unable to pass until lap 41 when Nannini ran wide at La Source, which allowed Berger to take third place from the Italian. Ayrton Senna took his fifth win of the season by 3.5 seconds over Prost, whilst the rest of the top six were rounded out by teammate Berger, Nannini, Piquet in the second Benetton and Mauricio Gugelmin in the Leyton House.

=== Race classification ===
Pos	No	Driver	Constructor	Laps	Time/Retired	Grid	Points
1	27	(Brazil) Ayrton Senna	McLaren-Honda	44	1:26:31.997	1	9
2	1	(France) Alain Prost	Ferrari	44	+ 3.550	3	6
3	28	(Austria) Gerhard Berger	McLaren-Honda	44	+ 28.462	2	4
4	19	(Italy) Alessandro Nannini	Benetton-Ford	44	+ 49.337	6	3
5	20	(Brazil) Nelson Piquet	Benetton-Ford	44	+ 1:29.650	8	2
6	15	(Brazil) Maurício Gugelmin	Leyton House-Judd	44	+ 1:48.851	14	1
7	16	(Italy) Ivan Capelli	Leyton House-Judd	43	+ 1 lap	12	
8	4	(France) Jean Alesi	Tyrrell-Ford	43	+ 1 lap	9	
9	29	(France) Éric Bernard	Lola-Lamborghini	43	+ 1 lap	15	
10	10	(Italy) Alex Caffi	Arrows-Ford	43	+ 1 lap	19	
11	11	(United Kingdom) Derek Warwick	Lotus-Lamborghini	43	+ 1 lap	18	
12	12	(United Kingdom) Martin Donnelly	Lotus-Lamborghini	43	+ 1 lap	22	
13	9	(Italy) Michele Alboreto	Arrows-Ford	43	+ 1 lap	26	
14	25	(Italy) Nicola Larini	Ligier-Ford	42	+ 2 laps	21	
15	23	(Italy) Pierluigi Martini	Minardi-Ford	42	+ 2 laps	16	
16	14	(France) Olivier Grouillard	Osella-Ford	42	+ 2 laps	23	
17	8	(Italy) Stefano Modena	Brabham-Judd	39	Engine	13	
Ret	7	(Australia) David Brabham	Brabham-Judd	36	Electrical	24	
Ret	22	(Italy) Andrea de Cesaris	Dallara-Ford	27	Engine	20	
Ret	5	(Belgium) Thierry Boutsen	Williams-Renault	21	Transmission	4	
Ret	2	(United Kingdom) Nigel Mansell	Ferrari	19	Handling	5	
Ret	6	(Italy) Riccardo Patrese	Williams-Renault	18	Gearbox	7	
Ret	21	(Italy) Emanuele Pirro	Dallara-Ford	5	Water leak	17	
Ret	3	(Japan) Satoru Nakajima	Tyrrell-Ford	4	Engine	10	
Ret	30	(Japan) Aguri Suzuki	Lola-Lamborghini	0	Accident	11	
Ret	24	(Italy) Paolo Barilla	Minardi-Ford	0	Accident	25	
DNQ	26	(France) Philippe Alliot	Ligier-Ford				
DNQ	17	(Italy) Gabriele Tarquini	AGS-Ford				
DNQ	18	(France) Yannick Dalmas	AGS-Ford				
DNQ	31	(Belgium) Bertrand Gachot	Coloni-Ford				
DNPQ	33	(Brazil) Roberto Moreno	EuroBrun-Judd				
DNPQ	34	(Italy) Claudio Langes	EuroBrun-Judd				
DNPQ	39	(Italy) Bruno Giacomelli	Life				

== Championship standings after the race ==
Drivers' Championship standings

Pos	Driver	Points
1	(Brazil) Ayrton Senna	63
2	(France) Alain Prost	50
3	(Austria) Gerhard Berger	33
4	(Belgium) Thierry Boutsen	27
5	(Brazil) Nelson Piquet	24

Constructors' Championship standings

Pos	Constructor	Points
1	(United Kingdom) McLaren-Honda	96
2	(Italy) Ferrari	63
3	(United Kingdom) Williams-Renault	42
4	(United Kingdom) Benetton-Ford	40
5	(United Kingdom) Tyrrell-Ford	14

- Note: Only the top five positions are included for both sets of standings.

Previous race: 1990 Hungarian Grand Prix	FIA Formula One World Championship; 1990 season	Next race: 1990 Italian Grand Prix
Previous race: 1989 Belgian Grand Prix	Belgian Grand Prix	Next race: 1991 Belgian Grand Prix
