= First Racing =

Auto racing team

(Italy) First Racing
- Founded: 1969
- Founder(s): Lamberto Leoni
- Folded: 1991
- Team principal(s): Lamberto Leoni
- Former series: European F2; International Formula 3000; Italian Formula Three Championship
- Noted drivers: (Italy) Marco Apicella (Italy) Fabrizio Giovanardi (France) Éric Hélary (Italy) Lamberto Leoni (Italy) Pierluigi Martini (Italy) Gabriele Tarquini (Brazil) Marco Greco (Switzerland) Jean-Denis Delétraz

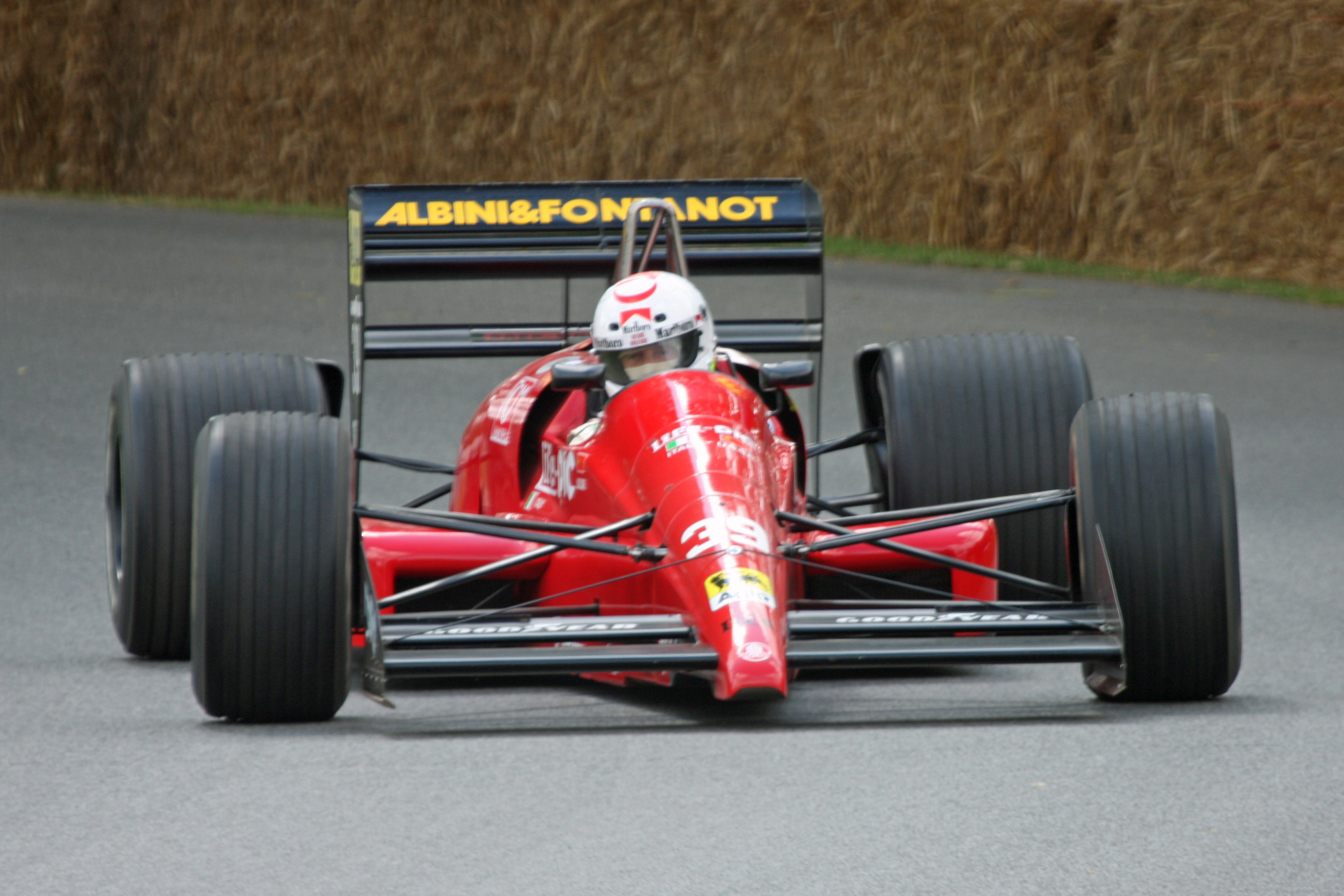
The Life L190 which was initially developed by FIRST in 1989.

First Racing (sometimes written as FIRST Racing) was an Italian motor racing team founded by Lamberto Leoni, which competed in International Formula 3000 from 1987 to 1991 and the Italian Formula Three Championship in 1990. The team also made an unsuccessful attempt to enter Formula One in 1989.

== Formula 3000 ==
In 1987 former Formula One racing driver Lamberto Leoni returned to competitive racing by founding his own Formula 3000 team. First Racing debuted in Silverstone with two cars, one for Leoni and another one for Gabriele Tarquini. Although Leoni was the first of the two drivers to score points, with a sixth place at the Pau Grand Prix, Tarquini was able to finish on the podium twice, with a third place at Pergusa and a second place at Imola. Over the course of the season, the team occasionally fielded a third car, with Aldo Bertuzzi, Beppe Gabbiani, Claudio Langes and Alain Ferté alternating at the wheel. For the following season, Leoni decided to limit his involvement to management, and hired Pierluigi Martini and Marco Apicella, with Martini scoring the team's first win at Pergusa and finishing fourth in the championship. In 1989, First set off to a promising start when Fabrizio Giovanardi won the second round of the championship at Vallelunga. Apicella, in the second car, proved to be a regular points-scorer, and finished fourth in the final standing podium finishes at Pau, Jerez, Birmingham and Spa. With the line-up of Giovanardi and Apicella confirmed, the team entered the 1990 season full of expectations, but the two drivers, despite scoring points on a regular basis, were not able to win any races. 1991 proved to be First's final season in Formula 3000. Financial difficulties prompted Leoni to hire two pay drivers, Michael Bartels and Jean-Denis Délétraz. The car, however, was uncompetitive, and following a string of poor results, Leoni decided to retire the team and concentrate on managing the career of Apicella.

== Formula One ==
Buoyed by the promising results accomplished during his first Formula 3000 season, Leoni commissioned Richard Divila to design a car for entry into the 1989 Formula One championship. The team opted to use a Judd V8 engine. Gabriele Tarquini was signed to drive. After a run at the 1989 Attilio Bettega Memorial event in Bologna and the Formula One Indoor Trophy, the team realized that the chassis was poorly manufactured due to a temperature mistake in the autoclave, with the result that a second chassis had to be re-commissioned. Having concluded that the delay would cost the team a penalty for missing the first two races of the season, Divila and his engineers tried to reinforce the chassis with injections of a material called Redus 410 NA. Although the car passed the mandatory FIA pre-season crash test in Cranfield, it was now significantly overweight. Divila himself claimed that the car as it was, was good for nothing but being "an interesting flowerpot". Faced with the perspective of racing an uncompetitive car in a packed field (the 1989 Formula One World Championship counted over forty participants with pre-qualifying sessions), Leoni decided to withdraw before the opening Brazilian Grand Prix and concentrate his efforts on the Formula 3000 season.

The second chassis commissioned by Leoni would be later purchased by Ernesto Vita and used in the 1990 Formula One World Championship for his Life L190.

== Competition record ==
=== Complete Formula 3000 results ===
first column of every race	10	= grid position

second column of every race	10	= race result

Year	Driver	Country	Place	Chassis	Engine	1		2		3		4		5		6		7		8		9		10		11
1987	Gabriele Tarquini	Italy	8th	March	Ford Cosworth	9	10	9	R	11	12	5	R11	15	19	7	3	18	17	7	14	8	2	19	5	4	R
1987	Lamberto Leoni	Italy	8th	March	Ford Cosworth	18	8	8	8	25	13	18	6	6	R	10	5	17	11	18	R
1987	Lamberto Leoni	Italy	8th	March	Judd																	9	4	12	4	17	4
1987	Beppe Gabbiani	Italy	NC	March	Ford Cosworth	-	-	20	12	19	R	-	-	-	-	-	-	-	-	-	-	-	-	-	-	-	-
1987	Claudio Langes	Italy	NC	March	Ford Cosworth	-	-	-	-	-	-	-	-	29	NQ	20	R	21	R	24	10	-	-	-	-	15	R
1987	Alain Ferté	France	NC	March	Ford Cosworth	-	-	-	-	-	-	-	-	-	-	-	-	-	-	-	-	-	-	22	R	-	-
1988	Pierluigi Martini	Italy	4th	March	Judd	17	8	16	11	4	3	7	10	6	R	2	1	3	2	4	3	-	-	10	R	12	10
1988	Marco Apicella	Italy	11th	March	Judd	20	13	7	7	17	5	6	6	3	2	7	R	18	R	5	R	11	R	21	R	15	R
1988	Alain Ferté	France	NC	March	Judd	-	-	-	-	-	-	-	-	-	-	-	-	-	-	-	-	20	12	-	-	-	-
1989	Marco Apicella	Italy	4th	March	Judd	13	8
1989	Marco Apicella	Italy	4th	Reynard	Judd			2	R	1	2	5	3	5	4	12	R	2	2	8	3	8	R	9	R
1989	Fabrizio Giovanardi	Italy	10th	March	Judd	28	NQ	7	1
1989	Fabrizio Giovanardi	Italy	10th	Reynard	Judd					6	R	21	14	12	R	29	NQ	21	NS	26	13	28	NQ	20	12
1989	Jean-Denis Delétraz	Switzerland	NC	March	Judd	26	14	19	R	16	R	25	15
1989	Jean-Denis Delétraz	Switzerland	NC	Reynard	Judd									18	R	15	R	13	12	27	NQ	15	R	12	9
1990	Marco Apicella	Italy	6th	Reynard	Mugen Honda	3	13	6	3	3	R	2	2	7	5	2	R	2	2	5	DIS(3)	1	R	5	R	11	5
1990	Fabrizio Giovanardi	Italy	10th	Reynard	Mugen Honda	16	R	10	R	2	2	13	6	21	10	15	6	13	7	19	R	18	5	18	R	10	R
1990	Jean-Denis Délétraz	Switzerland	NC	Reynard	Ford Cosworth	21	7	31	NQ	18	R	27	NQ	25	R	-	-	-	-	-	-	-	-	-	-	-	-
1990	Marco Greco	Brazil	NC	Reynard	Ford Cosworth	-	-	-	-	-	-	-	-	-	-	-	-	-	-	-	-	-	-	28	NQ	32	NQ
1991	Éric Hélary	France	8th †	Reynard	Ford Cosworth	14	11	7	3	16	R	17	R16	-	-	-	-	-	-	-	-	-	-	-	-	-	-
1991	Michael Bartels	Germany	NC	Reynard	Ford Cosworth		-	11	8	10	R	14	15	-	-	-	-	-	-	-	-	-	-	-	-	-	-
1991	Giovanni Bonanno	Italy	NC	Reynard	Ford Cosworth	22	R	-	-	-	-	-	-	-	-	-	-	-	-	-	-	-	-	-	-	-	-
1991	Jean-Denis Délétraz	Switzerland	NC	Reynard	Ford Cosworth	15	NS	24	NQ	13	R	-	-	-	-	-	-	-	-	-	-	-	-	-	-	-	-

† Éric Hélary finished season with Cobra Racing
