= Life Racing Engines =

Italian Formula One constructor

Life
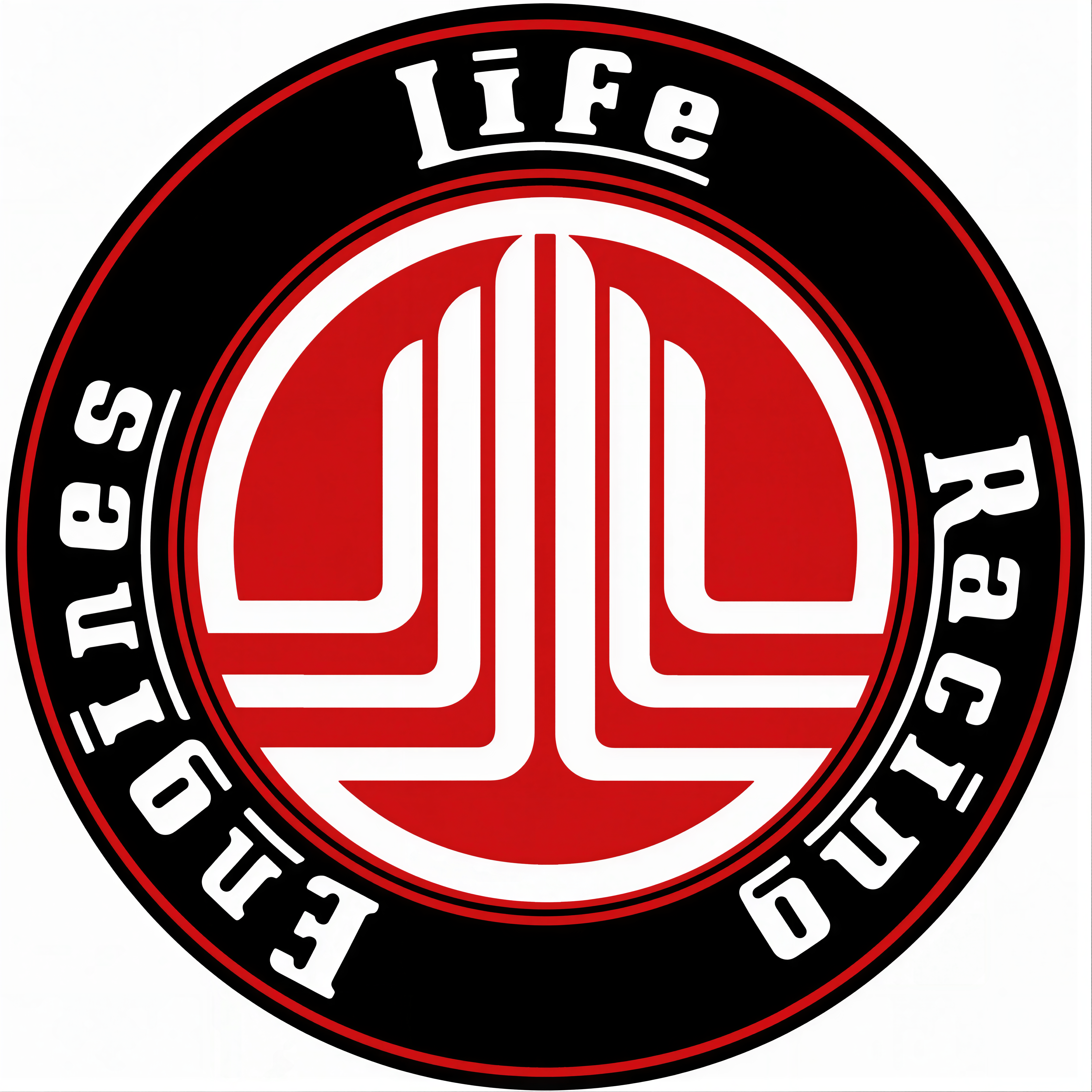
- Full name: Life Racing Engines
- Base: Formigine, Italy
- Founder(s): Ernesto Vita
- Noted staff: Oliver Piazzi
- Noted drivers: (Australia) Gary Brabham (Italy) Bruno Giacomelli (Italy) Franco Scapini

Formula One World Championship career
- First entry: 1990 United States Grand Prix
- Races entered: 14 (0 starts)
- Constructors' Championships: 0
- Drivers' Championships: 0
- Race victories: 0
- Pole positions: 0
- Fastest laps: 0
- Final entry: 1990 Spanish Grand Prix

Life was a Formula One constructor from Modena, Italy. The company was named for its founder, Ernesto Vita ("Vita" is Italian for "Life"). Life first emerged on the Formula One scene in 1990, trying to market their unconventional W12 3.5-litre engine.

The team had a disastrous single season, and failed to make the grid in all 14 attempted starts during the 1990 season, often clocking in laps many seconds slower than their next competitor.

== W12 engine ==
Life's W12, or "broad arrow", engine had been designed by the former Ferrari engineer Franco Rocchi, who had been responsible for, among others, Ferrari's 3-litre V8 for the 1970s 308 GTB and GTS. Rocchi's W12 plans dated back to a 1967 single-module W3 of 500 cc (31 cu in) as a prototype for a 3-litre W18 Ferrari engine of a planned 480 hp. After his dismissal in 1980, Rocchi worked privately on an engine in a W12 configuration.

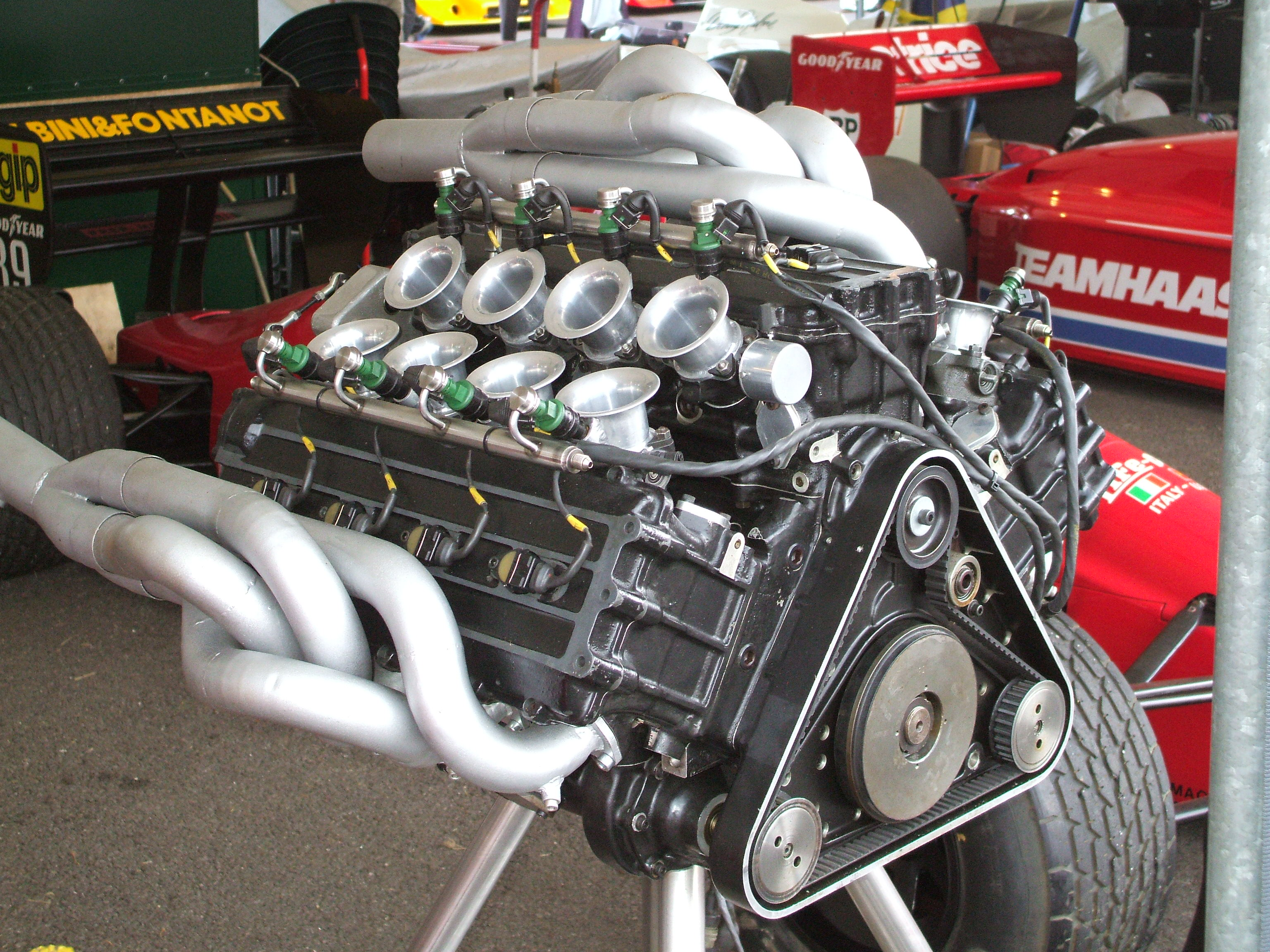
Life W12 engine on display at Goodwood Festival of Speed 2009

According to his concept, the engine had three banks of four DOHC cylinders; hence it was short like a V8 but taller than a regular V-banked engine. In France, Guy Nègre from Moteurs Guy Nègre worked on a similar machine that saw the light of day in 1989 before being tested privately in an out-dated AGS JH22, chassis. Apart from the W12 configuration, both engines bore no other similarities, nor were there any links between their designers. Life's W12 architecture resembles closely that of the Napier-Lion W12 engine.

Ernesto Vita was able to convince the retired ex-Ferrari engineer to go back to the drawing board to make the W12 concept come true. Rocchi's W12 was ready in the first half of the 1989 Formula One season. It was the time when turbocharged engines were no longer legal in Formula One and the rules required a naturally aspirated motor. New engine manufacturers entered Formula One (such as Ilmor, Judd and Yamaha), and new ideas broke through. Ferrari and Lamborghini used V12 engines (successfully in the former's case), Carlo Chiti's Motori Moderni unsuccessfully tried to revive flat-12 engines, badged as Subarus and used by the Coloni team, whilst Renault and Honda developed V10 engines, used successfully by Williams and McLaren.

Vita's plan was to sell the engine concept to a well-funded Formula One team. During 1989, he searched for a partner without any success. Finally, he gave up his search and decided to run the engine on his own in the 1990 Formula One season.

== Birth of the team ==
Vita founded the Life Team, "life" being the English translation of his family name. The team's headquarters were originally split between the technical offices in Reggio Emilia and the factory in Formigine, near Modena, then regrouped under the same roof in Formigine. While not having state of the art facilities, the factory was equipped with a "Borghi e Severi" dyno bench and related AVL datalogging computers, which was used for the development of the W12 motor, standard toolshop machines, and a warehouse. As Life was not able to build a car on its own, the team purchased the still-born Formula One chassis from First Racing that had been designed by Richard Divila for Lamberto Leoni's abortive Formula One team the year before. In late 1989, the chassis was fitted with his W12 engine. The major engineering work had been done by Gianni Marelli, another former Ferrari man. The car – now dubbed Life L190 – was ready by February 1990, and tested briefly at Vallelunga and Monza.

== 1990 season ==
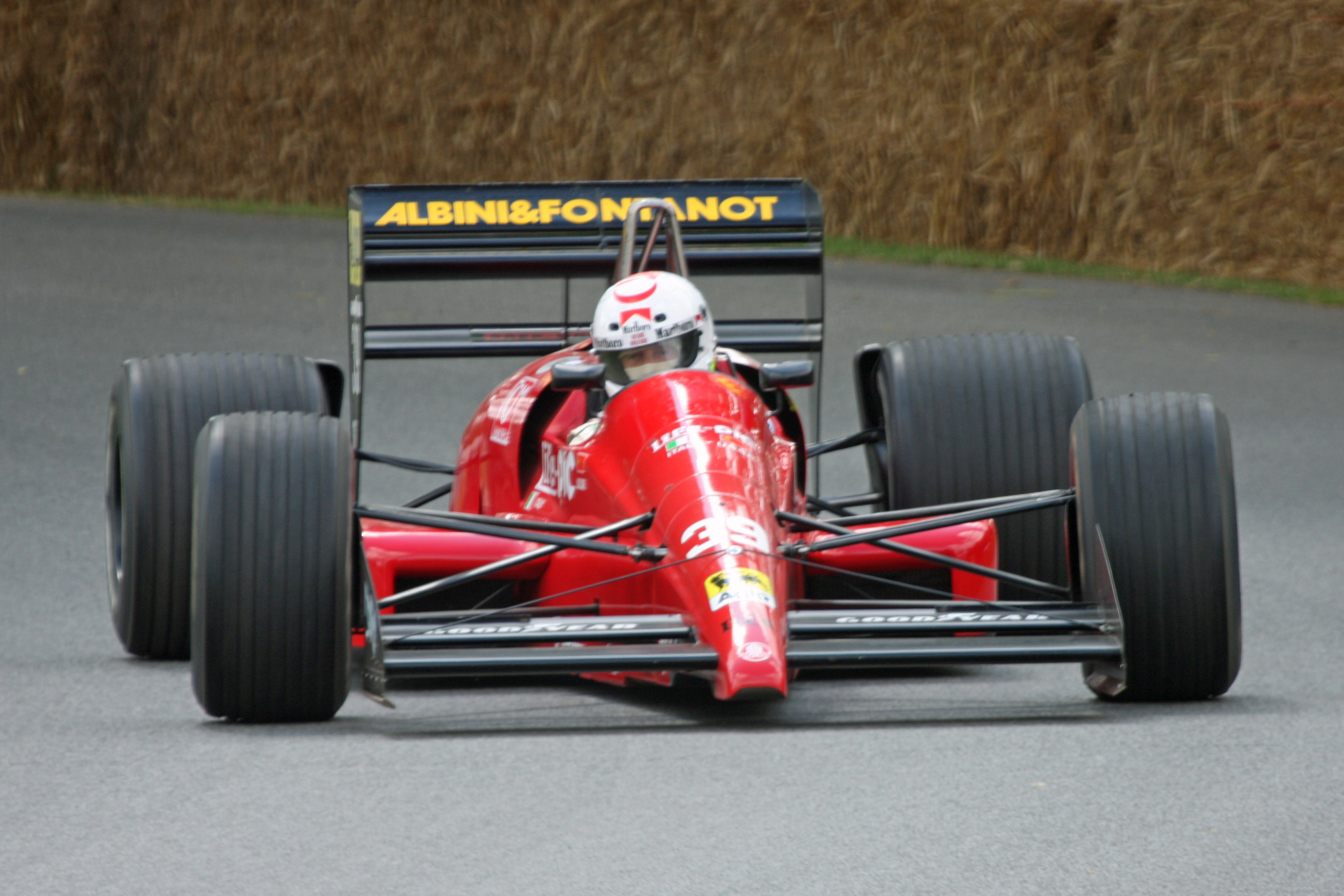
The Life L190 at Goodwood Festival of Speed 2009 driven by Arturo Merzario

When the new season came, the team had one chassis, four engines and spare parts, and a spare chassis. The W12 turned out to be the least powerful engine of the year: its widely reported output was 470 bhp (350 kW; 477 PS) while others produced 600 bhp (447 kW; 608 PS) to 700 bhp (522 kW; 710 PS). At the same time, the ex-First L190 chassis was one of the heaviest cars in the field at 530 kg. Handling was bad and reliability was poor. As a result, the Life was no faster than a Formula 3 car. Even in Formula 3000, it would have been outclassed. However, during an episode of motorsport website The Race's Bring Back V10s podcast Andrew van der Burgt said that Giacomelli had told him that the W12 engine produced even less power than the team claimed and produced little more than 300 bhp.

Several drivers were approached to drive for the team, including Gabriele Tarquini, Pierluigi Martini, Marco Apicella, Roberto Moreno and Gianni Morbidelli. Ultimately Sir Jack Brabham's son Gary Brabham was signed to drive with Franco Scapini hired as test driver and Sergio Barbasio as team manager. When Brabham failed to pre-qualify twice he left the team for good, as the car had coasted to a halt after 400 yards with a malfunctioning battery. Brabham later stated that the car did not have a functioning tachometer in either of the pre-qualifying sessions, and that the team did not possess a tyre pressure gauge, having to borrow one from the EuroBrun team. This claim is disputed by the team's former mechanics. He also made efforts to persuade the team to switch to a Judd CV V8 engine, but was unsuccessful. Designer Gianni Marelli also left the team at this stage, after a disagreement with Vita.

After Brabham left, Vita tried to replace the Australian with Bernd Schneider, who had stood in at Arrows at the first race of the season, but the German driver refused. "I definitely don't want to drive for them", he said. Test driver Scapini was also a candidate to replace Brabham, but the Italian was not granted an FIA Super Licence. Another driver contacted by the team was New Zealander Rob Wilson, who said he would be interested in driving for Life, especially if the team expanded to two cars.

Bruno Giacomelli, an Italian veteran who had last raced in Formula One in 1983, was then signed by the team. Giacomelli was an attractive proposition as he had recent experience of Formula 1 cars in his role as test driver for Leyton House Racing and good contacts with Engine Developments, who designed and manufactured the Judd Formula 1 engines. The most laps made by the car during pre-qualifying was twenty-two in Silverstone. At the 1990 San Marino Grand Prix Giacomelli said that he was scared he might be struck from behind as his car was so slow. In the pre-qualifying sessions for that race, Giacomelli apparently finished his run with an almost six-minute gap to the second slowest time, as his car broke down at the end of the pit lane on the out lap, and the car's transponder was left switched on, resulting in it being timed while being towed. For the Portuguese Grand Prix, the team replaced its original W12 engine with the more conventional Judd CV V8, an enormous undertaking completed in under three weeks by a minuscule and chronically underfunded company. The car successfully began the pre-qualifying round, however, on its first lap at Estoril, the engine cover came loose and flew off. The last appearance of the car was at Jerez for the Spanish GP. Subsequently, the team opted to withdraw before the final two Grands Prix.

The race team usually consisted of only nine people: the racing driver; Sergio Barbasio (team manager); Franco Scapini (test driver); Francesca Papa (Ernesto Vita's wife); Maurizio Ferrari (engineer); Emilio Gabrielli (truckie and mechanic); and the three mechanics: chief mechanic Oliver Piazzi, Heinz Willi Mueller and Luca Cassoni.

== After Formula One ==
The Life L190 which took part in the 1990 Formula One World Championship was fully restored in 2009 by Oliver Piazzi and ran at the 2009 Goodwood Festival of Speed with its original W12 engine back in place. It made two successful attempts at completing the Goodwood hill climb, driven by Arturo Merzario, and Lorenzo Prandina, who at that time was the owner of the car.

== Complete Formula One results ==
(key)

Year	Chassis	Engines	Tyres	Drivers	1	2	3	4	5	6	7	8	9	10	11	12	13	14	15	16	Points	WCC
1990	L190	F35 3.5 W12	G		USA	BRA	SMR	MON	CAN	MEX	FRA	GBR	GER	HUN	BEL	ITA	POR	ESP	JPN	AUS	0	NC
1990	L190	F35 3.5 W12	G	(Australia) Gary Brabham	DNPQ	DNPQ															0	NC
1990	L190	F35 3.5 W12	G	(Italy) Bruno Giacomelli			DNPQ	DNPQ	DNPQ	DNPQ	DNPQ	DNPQ	DNPQ	DNPQ	DNPQ	DNPQ					0	NC
1990	L190	Judd CV 3.5 V8	G	(Italy) Bruno Giacomelli													DNPQ	DNPQ			0	NC
