= 1990 Spanish Grand Prix =

- Race 14 of 16 in the 1990 Formula One World Championship

Race details
- Date: 30 September 1990
- Official name: XXXI Gran Premio Tio Pepe de España
- Location: Circuito Permanente de Jerez; Jerez de la Frontera, Spain
- Course: Permanent racing facility
- Course length: 4.218 km (2.6209 miles)
- Distance: 73 laps, 307.918 km (191.328 miles)
- Weather: Dry, hot, sunny

Pole position
Driver	(Brazil) Ayrton Senna	McLaren-Honda
- Time: 1:18.387

Fastest lap
Driver	(Italy) Riccardo Patrese	Williams-Renault
- Time: 1:24.513 on lap 53

Podium
First	(France) Alain Prost	Ferrari
Second	(United Kingdom) Nigel Mansell	Ferrari
Third	(Italy) Alessandro Nannini	Benetton-Ford

The 1990 Spanish Grand Prix was a Formula One motor race held at Jerez on 30 September 1990. It was the fourteenth race of the 1990 Formula One World Championship, and the fifth and last Spanish Grand Prix to be held at Jerez (though the circuit would host the European Grand Prix in 1994 and 1997).

The 73-lap race was won by Alain Prost, driving a Ferrari, with teammate Nigel Mansell second and Alessandro Nannini third in a Benetton-Ford. Prost's Drivers' Championship rival, Ayrton Senna, took the 50th pole position of his career in his McLaren-Honda, but retired with a failed radiator, allowing Prost to close to within nine points of him in the championship with two races remaining.

This would be the last Ferrari race win until the 1994 German Grand Prix and the last one-two victory until the 1998 French Grand Prix. Also for the all-time Grand Prix wins leader of the time in Prost, this would be his last win until the 1993 South African Grand Prix.

The event was marred by a serious incident during Friday practice, when Martin Donnelly crashed his Lotus 102 at the high-speed Turn 14. Donnelly was thrown from the wreckage, suffering serious injuries that ended his Formula One career. This also turned out to be the last F1 race and podium for Nannini, who severed his right arm in a helicopter crash the following week (though he would return to racing as a touring car driver), as well as the last race for the back-marking EuroBrun and Life teams.

Footage from Donnelly's practice crash was used to present a major plot point for the 2025 film F1.

== Qualifying ==
=== Pre-qualifying report ===
In the Friday morning pre-qualifying session, the same four drivers went through to the main qualifying sessions as had progressed in the previous three events. This time it was Yannick Dalmas who topped the time sheets in his AGS, the first time he had done so this season. Gabriele Tarquini made it an AGS 1–2, just over a tenth of a second behind. Olivier Grouillard was a shade slower in third in the Osella, while Bertrand Gachot was nearly two seconds slower in the Coloni, back in fourth.

In fifth place, Roberto Moreno missed the cut by just 0.018 of a second in the EuroBrun, with Claudio Langes just over a second behind in sixth. Langes' gap to Gachot of 1.133 seconds represented the closest the Italian had come all season to successfully pre-qualifying, as he had failed to pre-qualify for all 14 races so far this season. This proved to be his last opportunity, as EuroBrun withdrew from Formula One after this event.

It was also the last event for the hapless Life team, who also withdrew afterwards. Bruno Giacomelli managed two laps in the L190 before it stopped midway through the circuit, its new Judd engine apparently not providing much improvement. The car had never come within 12 seconds of pre-qualifying successfully at any of its 14 events. To make matters worse, the Life team did not bring a jack to Jerez, forcing mechanics to lift the L190 by its suspension arms. The absence of EuroBrun and Life at the last two Grands Prix of the season avoided the need for pre-qualifying at those events.

=== Pre-qualifying classification ===
Pos	No	Driver	Constructor	Time	Gap
1	18	(France) Yannick Dalmas	AGS-Ford	1:22.470	—
2	17	(Italy) Gabriele Tarquini	AGS-Ford	1:22.592	+0.122
3	14	(France) Olivier Grouillard	Osella-Ford	1:22.708	+0.238
4	31	(Belgium) Bertrand Gachot	Coloni-Ford	1:24.603	+2.133
5	33	(Brazil) Roberto Moreno	EuroBrun-Judd	1:24.621	+2.151
6	34	(Italy) Claudio Langes	EuroBrun-Judd	1:25.736	+3.266
7	39	(Italy) Bruno Giacomelli	Life-Judd	1:42.699	+20.229

=== Qualifying classification ===
Pos	No	Driver	Constructor	Q1	Q2	Gap
1	27	(Brazil) Ayrton Senna	McLaren-Honda	1:18.900	1:18.387	—
2	1	(France) Alain Prost	Ferrari	1:20.026	1:18.824	+0.437
3	2	(United Kingdom) Nigel Mansell	Ferrari	1:21.005	1:19.106	+0.719
4	4	(France) Jean Alesi	Tyrrell-Ford	1:19.923	1:19.604	+1.217
5	28	(Austria) Gerhard Berger	McLaren-Honda	1:19.643	1:19.618	+1.231
6	6	(Italy) Riccardo Patrese	Williams-Renault	1:20.562	1:19.647	+1.260
7	5	(Belgium) Thierry Boutsen	Williams-Renault	1:20.721	1:19.689	+1.302
8	20	(Brazil) Nelson Piquet	Benetton-Ford	1:21.111	1:19.700	+1.313
9	19	(Italy) Alessandro Nannini	Benetton-Ford	1:21.383	1:20.367	+1.980
10	11	(United Kingdom) Derek Warwick	Lotus-Lamborghini	1:22.111	1:20.610	+2.223
11	23	(Italy) Pierluigi Martini	Minardi-Ford	1:22.255	1:21.060	+2.673
12	15	(Brazil) Maurício Gugelmin	Leyton House-Judd	1:23.019	1:21.167	+2.780
13	26	(France) Philippe Alliot	Ligier-Ford	1:23.783	1:21.170	+2.783
14	3	(Japan) Satoru Nakajima	Tyrrell-Ford	1:22.690	1:21.215	+2.828
15	30	(Japan) Aguri Suzuki	Lola-Lamborghini	1:21.740	1:21.244	+2.857
16	21	(Italy) Emanuele Pirro	Dallara-Ford	1:23.485	1:21.277	+2.890
17	22	(Italy) Andrea de Cesaris	Dallara-Ford	1:22.953	1:21.467	+3.080
18	29	(France) Éric Bernard	Lola-Lamborghini	1:22.403	1:21.551	+3.164
19	16	(Italy) Ivan Capelli	Leyton House-Judd	1:23.866	1:21.916	+3.529
20	25	(Italy) Nicola Larini	Ligier-Ford	1:23.290	1:21.996	+3.609
21	14	(France) Olivier Grouillard	Osella-Ford	1:24.784	1:22.288	+3.901
22	17	(Italy) Gabriele Tarquini	AGS-Ford	1:23.260	1:22.466	+4.079
23	12	(United Kingdom) Martin Donnelly	Lotus-Lamborghini	1:22.659	no time	+4.272
24	18	(France) Yannick Dalmas	AGS-Ford	1:23.249	1:22.716	+4.329
25	8	(Italy) Stefano Modena	Brabham-Judd	1:23.641	1:23.133	+4.746
26	9	(Italy) Michele Alboreto	Arrows-Ford	1:24.043	1:23.161	+4.774
27	7	(Australia) David Brabham	Brabham-Judd	1:25.899	1:23.163	+4.776
28	24	(Italy) Paolo Barilla	Minardi-Ford	1:25.093	1:23.274	+4.887
29	10	(Germany) Bernd Schneider	Arrows-Ford	1:24.675	1:23.924	+5.537
30	31	(Belgium) Bertrand Gachot	Coloni-Ford	1:26.593	1:25.114	+6.727

== Race ==
=== Race report ===
On the start Patrese collided with Jean Alesi, and sending the Frenchman into a heavy spin at turn 1 into the gravel trap and then retired as a result. As it was Senna who lead the early stages before lap 27 as Nelson Piquet then took the lead for two laps as a result of not pitting before Prost then took the lead on lap 29, Piquet who pitted after 40 laps would eventually retire with battery problems after 48 laps, Ayrton Senna would also retire with the result of a punctured radiator on lap 54 forcing the Brazilian into retirement, as did Gerhard Berger after colliding with Thierry Boutsen on Lap 57. From there the Ferrari drivers eventually dominated the race with reigning world champion Alain Prost leading his teammate Nigel Mansell home by 22 seconds for a 1-2 finish. British Team Lotus driver Martin Donnelly had a horrific crash during Friday practice at the very fast Turn 14; the seat of his Lotus 102 broke free and was flung clear of the wreck. Donnelly received serious injuries that took months of recovery, bringing an end to his Formula One career, although he later returned to racing. Team Lotus decided not to retire from the race, and Derek Warwick was close to the point-scoring positions when he became the race's final retirement on lap 63 with a broken gearbox in the other Lotus 102. Donnelly attributed his survival to safety improvements made after Riccardo Paletti's fatal accident at the 1982 Canadian Grand Prix.

The race also turned out to be the last race of Alessandro Nannini's Formula One career. Nannini claimed the final podium position of the race in his Benetton B190, the ninth podium of his career, finishing ahead of the Williams pair of Thierry Boutsen and Riccardo Patrese. One week after the race, his right arm was severed in a helicopter accident. Nannini recovered and returned to racing as a touring car driver.

At the start of the race, Gerhard Berger, desperate to move up from his fifth place on the grid, gave Jean Alesi no room, resulting in Alesi moving to the outside, where he was hit and put out of the race by Riccardo Patrese.

The Larrousse-Lola of Aguri Suzuki claimed the final championship point of the race, continuing an encouraging season for the French team. It was an encouraging race for another French team, Yannick Dalmas and Gabriele Tarquini both qualified in AGS JH25s in a first for the team, but AGS never again got two cars onto a Formula One grid. Dalmas finished in ninth position, the highlight of the season for the small French team. The ninth-placed finish saved the team from pre-qualifying for the first half of 1991 as it moved them up to a crucial 13th place in the Constructors Championship. As a consequence, Scuderia Italia dropped into pre-qualifying, as they failed to finish higher than 10th all season.

McLaren driver Ayrton Senna's lap 53 retirement with a failed radiator reduced his lead in the world championship over Prost to nine points with just the Japanese and Australian Grands Prix remaining in the season.

=== Race classification ===
Pos	No	Driver	Constructor	Laps	Time/Retired	Grid	Points
1	1	(France) Alain Prost	Ferrari	73	1:48:01.461	2	9
2	2	(United Kingdom) Nigel Mansell	Ferrari	73	+ 22.064	3	6
3	19	(Italy) Alessandro Nannini	Benetton-Ford	73	+ 34.874	9	4
4	5	(Belgium) Thierry Boutsen	Williams-Renault	73	+ 43.296	7	3
5	6	(Italy) Riccardo Patrese	Williams-Renault	73	+ 57.530	6	2
6	30	(Japan) Aguri Suzuki	Lola-Lamborghini	73	+ 1:03.728	15	1
7	25	(Italy) Nicola Larini	Ligier-Ford	72	+ 1 lap	20	
8	15	(Brazil) Maurício Gugelmin	Leyton House-Judd	72	+ 1 lap	12	
9	18	(France) Yannick Dalmas	AGS-Ford	72	+ 1 lap	23	
10	9	(Italy) Michele Alboreto	Arrows-Ford	71	+ 2 laps	25	
Ret	11	(United Kingdom) Derek Warwick	Lotus-Lamborghini	63	Gearbox	10	
Ret	16	(Italy) Ivan Capelli	Leyton House-Judd	59	Physical	19	
Ret	28	(Austria) Gerhard Berger	McLaren-Honda	56	Collision	5	
Ret	27	(Brazil) Ayrton Senna	McLaren-Honda	53	Radiator	1	
Ret	20	(Brazil) Nelson Piquet	Benetton-Ford	47	Battery	8	
Ret	22	(Italy) Andrea de Cesaris	Dallara-Ford	47	Engine	17	
Ret	14	(France) Olivier Grouillard	Osella-Ford	45	Wheel bearing	21	
Ret	23	(Italy) Pierluigi Martini	Minardi-Ford	41	Spun off	11	
Ret	26	(France) Philippe Alliot	Ligier-Ford	22	Spun off	13	
Ret	29	(France) Éric Bernard	Lola-Lamborghini	20	Gearbox	18	
Ret	3	(Japan) Satoru Nakajima	Tyrrell-Ford	13	Spun off	14	
Ret	17	(Italy) Gabriele Tarquini	AGS-Ford	5	Engine	22	
Ret	8	(Italy) Stefano Modena	Brabham-Judd	5	Collision	24	
Ret	4	(France) Jean Alesi	Tyrrell-Ford	0	Spun off	4	
Ret	21	(Italy) Emanuele Pirro	Dallara-Ford	0	Throttle	16	
DNS	12	(United Kingdom) Martin Donnelly	Lotus-Lamborghini		Driver injured		
DNQ	7	(Australia) David Brabham	Brabham-Judd				
DNQ	24	(Italy) Paolo Barilla	Minardi-Ford				
DNQ	10	(Germany) Bernd Schneider	Arrows-Ford				
DNQ	31	(Belgium) Bertrand Gachot	Coloni-Ford				
DNPQ	33	(Brazil) Roberto Moreno	EuroBrun-Judd				
DNPQ	34	(Italy) Claudio Langes	EuroBrun-Judd				
DNPQ	39	(Italy) Bruno Giacomelli	Life-Judd				

== Championship standings after the race ==
Drivers' Championship standings

Pos	Driver	Points
1	(Brazil) Ayrton Senna	78
2	(France) Alain Prost	69
3	(Austria) Gerhard Berger	40
4	(United Kingdom) Nigel Mansell	31
5	(Belgium) Thierry Boutsen	30

Constructors' Championship standings

Pos	Constructor	Points
1	(United Kingdom) McLaren-Honda	118
2	(Italy) Ferrari	100
3	(United Kingdom) Williams-Renault	49
4	(United Kingdom) Benetton-Ford	47
5	(United Kingdom) Tyrrell-Ford	15

- Note: Only the top five positions are included for both sets of standings.

Previous race: 1990 Portuguese Grand Prix	FIA Formula One World Championship; 1990 season	Next race: 1990 Japanese Grand Prix
Previous race: 1989 Spanish Grand Prix	Spanish Grand Prix	Next race: 1991 Spanish Grand Prix; Next race at Jerez: 1994 European Grand Prix
