= 1990 Hungarian Grand Prix =

- Race 10 of 16 in the 1990 Formula One World Championship

Race details
- Date: 12 August 1990
- Location: Hungaroring; Mogyoród, Hungary
- Course: Permanent racing facility
- Course length: 3.968 km (2.466 miles)
- Distance: 77 laps, 305.536 km (189.851 miles)
- Weather: Dry

Pole position
Driver	(Belgium) Thierry Boutsen	Williams-Renault
- Time: 1:17.919

Fastest lap
Driver	(Italy) Riccardo Patrese	Williams-Renault
- Time: 1:22.058 on lap 63

Podium
First	(Belgium) Thierry Boutsen	Williams-Renault
Second	(Brazil) Ayrton Senna	McLaren-Honda
Third	(Brazil) Nelson Piquet	Benetton-Ford

The 1990 Hungarian Grand Prix was a Formula One motor race held at Hungaroring on 12 August 1990. It was the tenth race of the 1990 Formula One World Championship. The race was the sixth Hungarian Grand Prix and the fifth to be held at the Hungaroring. It was held over 77 laps of the 3.97-kilometre (2.47 mi) circuit for a race distance of 305.5 kilometres (189.8 mi).

Belgian driver Thierry Boutsen, driving a Williams-Renault, took his third and final Grand Prix win after leading the entire race. Ayrton Senna, driving a McLaren-Honda, finished less than 0.3 seconds behind Boutsen, having survived a collision with the Benetton-Ford of Alessandro Nannini. Nannini's teammate Nelson Piquet finished third. It turned out to be Boutsen's final podium of his career. As of 2026, this is the last victory and podium finish in Formula One for a driver competing under the Belgian flag.

With rival Alain Prost failing to finish, Senna increased his lead in the Drivers' Championship over the Frenchman.

== Pre-race ==
In the run-up to the race, Camel announced that it was ending its sponsorship of Lotus at the end of 1990 and would be sponsoring Williams and Benetton in 1991.

== Qualifying ==
=== Pre-qualifying report ===
As at the previous event in Germany, the Ligier drivers were first and second in the Friday morning pre-qualifying session. The positions were reversed, however, with Nicola Larini outpacing team-mate Philippe Alliot. The other two pre-qualifiers were the AGS cars, driven by Yannick Dalmas in third, and Gabriele Tarquini in fourth, the pair nearly two seconds slower than the Ligiers. It was the first time since the French Grand Prix that both AGS cars had pre-qualified, and only the second time this season.

Also for only the second time this season, Olivier Grouillard failed to pre-qualify in the Osella, as he was fifth fastest, less than two tenths of a second slower than Tarquini. There was a big improvement from Bertrand Gachot in the Coloni, now seeing the benefits of the Cosworth DFR engine in place of the Subaru, as he was sixth fastest, just 0.264 seconds behind Tarquini. The EuroBruns were seventh and eighth, Roberto Moreno a couple of seconds faster than Claudio Langes, and bottom of the time sheets as usual was Bruno Giacomelli in the Life, missing the cut by a very wide margin. On this occasion the L190 managed five laps before the engine expired.

=== Pre-qualifying classification ===
Pos	No	Driver	Constructor	Time	Gap
1	25	(Italy) Nicola Larini	Ligier-Ford	1:21.518	—
2	26	(France) Philippe Alliot	Ligier-Ford	1:21.710	+0.192
3	18	(France) Yannick Dalmas	AGS-Ford	1:23.227	+1.709
4	17	(Italy) Gabriele Tarquini	AGS-Ford	1:23.406	+1.888
5	14	(France) Olivier Grouillard	Osella-Ford	1:23.582	+2.064
6	31	(Belgium) Bertrand Gachot	Coloni-Ford	1:23.670	+2.152
7	33	(Brazil) Roberto Moreno	EuroBrun-Judd	1:24.386	+2.868
8	34	(Italy) Claudio Langes	EuroBrun-Judd	1:26.514	+4.996
9	39	(Italy) Bruno Giacomelli	Life	1:41.431	+19.913

=== Qualifying report ===
On the tight and twisty Hungaroring, the two Williams filled the front row with Thierry Boutsen 0.036 seconds ahead of Riccardo Patrese. This was to be the only pole position of Boutsen's career. Gerhard Berger was third ahead of McLaren teammate Ayrton Senna, while Senna's Drivers' Championship rival Alain Prost could only manage eighth, behind Ferrari teammate Nigel Mansell, Jean Alesi in the Tyrrell and Alessandro Nannini in the Benetton. The top ten was completed by Nelson Piquet in the second Benetton and Andrea de Cesaris in the Dallara.

=== Qualifying classification ===
Pos	No	Driver	Constructor	Q1	Q2	Gap
1	5	(Belgium) Thierry Boutsen	Williams-Renault	1:19.691	1:17.919	—
2	6	(Italy) Riccardo Patrese	Williams-Renault	1:19.419	1:17.955	+0.036
3	28	(Austria) Gerhard Berger	McLaren-Honda	1:18.127	1:18.703	+0.208
4	27	(Brazil) Ayrton Senna	McLaren-Honda	1:20.389	1:18.162	+0.243
5	2	(United Kingdom) Nigel Mansell	Ferrari	1:18.739	1:18.719	+0.800
6	4	(France) Jean Alesi	Tyrrell-Ford	1:19.042	1:18.762	+0.843
7	19	(Italy) Alessandro Nannini	Benetton-Ford	1:19.300	1:18.901	+0.982
8	1	(France) Alain Prost	Ferrari	1:20.309	1:19.029	+1.110
9	20	(Brazil) Nelson Piquet	Benetton-Ford	1:21.109	1:19.453	+1.534
10	22	(Italy) Andrea de Cesaris	Dallara-Ford	1:21.675	1:19.675	+1.756
11	11	(United Kingdom) Derek Warwick	Lotus-Lamborghini	1:21.154	1:19.839	+1.920
12	29	(France) Éric Bernard	Lola-Lamborghini	1:21.692	1:19.963	+2.044
13	21	(Italy) Emanuele Pirro	Dallara-Ford	1:21.070	1:19.970	+2.051
14	23	(Italy) Pierluigi Martini	Minardi-Ford	1:21.242	1:20.197	+2.278
15	3	(Japan) Satoru Nakajima	Tyrrell-Ford	1:21.449	1:20.202	+2.283
16	16	(Italy) Ivan Capelli	Leyton House-Judd	1:21.512	1:20.385	+2.466
17	15	(Brazil) Maurício Gugelmin	Leyton House-Judd	1:22.198	1:20.397	+2.478
18	12	(United Kingdom) Martin Donnelly	Lotus-Lamborghini	1:21.324	1:20.602	+2.683
19	30	(Japan) Aguri Suzuki	Lola-Lamborghini	1:21.577	1:20.619	+2.700
20	8	(Italy) Stefano Modena	Brabham-Judd	1:22.024	1:20.715	+2.786
21	26	(France) Philippe Alliot	Ligier-Ford	1:22.701	1:21.003	+3.084
22	9	(Italy) Michele Alboreto	Arrows-Ford	1:22.909	1:21.758	+3.839
23	24	(Italy) Paolo Barilla	Minardi-Ford	1:22.784	1:21.849	+3.930
24	17	(Italy) Gabriele Tarquini	AGS-Ford	1:23.827	1:21.964	+4.045
25	25	(Italy) Nicola Larini	Ligier-Ford	1:22.584	1:22.078	+4.159
26	10	(Italy) Alex Caffi	Arrows-Ford	1:22.986	1:22.126	+4.207
27	18	(France) Yannick Dalmas	AGS-Ford	1:23.116	1:22.263	+4.344
28	7	(Australia) David Brabham	Brabham-Judd	1:23.923	1:22.488	+4.569
29	36	(Finland) JJ Lehto	Onyx-Ford	no time	1:22.647	+4.728
30	35	(Switzerland) Gregor Foitek	Onyx-Ford	1:24.361	1:24.863	+6.442

== Race ==
=== Race report ===
At the start, Boutsen led away while Berger moved ahead of Patrese. Mansell and Alesi both passed Senna at the first corner, while de Cesaris shot past both Benettons and Prost. The top four started to pull away, while Alesi held up the cars behind him.

Nannini soon re-passed de Cesaris, but the Dallara driver kept ahead of Piquet and Prost before retiring on lap 23 with an engine failure. Senna passed Alesi on lap 21, only to suffer a puncture which dropped him to tenth. Nannini passed the Tyrrell driver shortly afterwards and quickly caught up to the top four, followed by Prost. On lap 36, Alesi collided with the Minardi of Pierluigi Martini, putting them both out; Prost retired at around the same time with a gearbox failure.

At the halfway point of the race, the top five remained Boutsen, Berger, Patrese, Mansell and Nannini, with Senna back up to sixth and closing fast. He moved ahead of teammate Berger when the Austrian pitted for new tyres. On lap 52 Mansell made an attempt to pass Patrese, only to fall behind Nannini and Senna. Patrese pitted a few laps later, falling to seventh behind Berger and Piquet.

On lap 64, Senna attempted to pass Nannini at the chicane. The two collided, putting the Benetton driver out. Then on lap 72, Berger attempted a similar move on Mansell, taking both drivers out. This left Boutsen and Senna nearly half a minute clear of Piquet. Senna tried to find a way past Boutsen, but the Belgian held him off, crossing the line 0.288 seconds ahead. Boutsen would later claim that if the race had continued for any longer his brakes would likely have failed. Piquet finished four seconds ahead of Patrese, with Derek Warwick in the Lotus and Éric Bernard in the Larrousse-Lola completing the top six.

Senna increased his lead over Prost in the Drivers' Championship to ten points, 54 to 44, with Berger on 29 and Boutsen on 27. McLaren also increased their lead in the Constructors' Championship, with 83 points to Ferrari's 57, followed by Williams on 42 and Benetton on 35.

=== Race classification ===
Pos	No	Driver	Constructor	Laps	Time/Retired	Grid	Points
1	5	(Belgium) Thierry Boutsen	Williams-Renault	77	1:49:30.597	1	9
2	27	(Brazil) Ayrton Senna	McLaren-Honda	77	+ 0.288	4	6
3	20	(Brazil) Nelson Piquet	Benetton-Ford	77	+ 27.893	9	4
4	6	(Italy) Riccardo Patrese	Williams-Renault	77	+ 31.833	2	3
5	11	(United Kingdom) Derek Warwick	Lotus-Lamborghini	77	+ 1:14.244	11	2
6	29	(France) Éric Bernard	Lola-Lamborghini	77	+ 1:24.308	12	1
7	12	(United Kingdom) Martin Donnelly	Lotus-Lamborghini	76	+ 1 lap	18	
8	15	(Brazil) Maurício Gugelmin	Leyton House-Judd	76	+ 1 lap	17	
9	10	(Italy) Alex Caffi	Arrows-Ford	76	+ 1 lap	26	
10	21	(Italy) Emanuele Pirro	Dallara-Ford	76	+ 1 lap	13	
11	25	(Italy) Nicola Larini	Ligier-Ford	76	+ 1 lap	25	
12	9	(Italy) Michele Alboreto	Arrows-Ford	75	+ 2 laps	22	
13	17	(Italy) Gabriele Tarquini	AGS-Ford	74	+ 3 laps	24	
14	26	(France) Philippe Alliot	Ligier-Ford	74	+ 3 laps	21	
15	24	(Italy) Paolo Barilla	Minardi-Ford	74	+ 3 laps	23	
16	28	(Austria) Gerhard Berger	McLaren-Honda	72	Collision	3	
17	2	(United Kingdom) Nigel Mansell	Ferrari	71	Collision	5	
Ret	19	(Italy) Alessandro Nannini	Benetton-Ford	64	Collision	7	
Ret	16	(Italy) Ivan Capelli	Leyton House-Judd	56	Gearbox	16	
Ret	30	(Japan) Aguri Suzuki	Lola-Lamborghini	37	Engine	19	
Ret	1	(France) Alain Prost	Ferrari	36	Gearbox	8	
Ret	4	(France) Jean Alesi	Tyrrell-Ford	36	Collision	6	
Ret	8	(Italy) Stefano Modena	Brabham-Judd	35	Engine	20	
Ret	23	(Italy) Pierluigi Martini	Minardi-Ford	35	Collision	14	
Ret	22	(Italy) Andrea de Cesaris	Dallara-Ford	22	Engine	10	
Ret	3	(Japan) Satoru Nakajima	Tyrrell-Ford	9	Brakes	15	
DNQ	18	(France) Yannick Dalmas	AGS-Ford				
DNQ	7	(Australia) David Brabham	Brabham-Judd				
DNQ	36	(Finland) JJ Lehto	Onyx-Ford				
DNQ	35	(Switzerland) Gregor Foitek	Onyx-Ford				
DNPQ	14	(France) Olivier Grouillard	Osella-Ford				
DNPQ	31	(Belgium) Bertrand Gachot	Coloni-Ford				
DNPQ	33	(Brazil) Roberto Moreno	EuroBrun-Judd				
DNPQ	34	(Italy) Claudio Langes	EuroBrun-Judd				
DNPQ	39	(Italy) Bruno Giacomelli	Life				

== Championship standings after the race ==
Drivers' Championship standings

Pos	Driver	Points
1	(Brazil) Ayrton Senna	54
2	(France) Alain Prost	44
3	(Austria) Gerhard Berger	29
4	(Belgium) Thierry Boutsen	27
5	(Brazil) Nelson Piquet	22

Constructors' Championship standings

Pos	Constructor	Points
1	(United Kingdom) McLaren-Honda	83
2	(Italy) Ferrari	57
3	(United Kingdom) Williams-Renault	42
4	(United Kingdom) Benetton-Ford	35
5	(United Kingdom) Tyrrell-Ford	14

- Note: Only the top five positions are included for both sets of standings.

Previous race: 1990 German Grand Prix	FIA Formula One World Championship; 1990 season	Next race: 1990 Belgian Grand Prix
Previous race: 1989 Hungarian Grand Prix	Hungarian Grand Prix	Next race: 1991 Hungarian Grand Prix
