= 1990 Mexican Grand Prix =

- Race 6 of 16 in the 1990 Formula One World Championship

Race details
- Date: 24 June 1990
- Official name: XIV Gran Premio de Mexico
- Location: Autódromo Hermanos Rodríguez; Mexico City, Mexico
- Course: Permanent racing facility
- Course length: 4.421 km (2.747 miles)
- Distance: 69 laps, 305.049 km (189.549 miles)
- Weather: Overcast; 21 °C (70 °F)

Pole position
Driver	(Austria) Gerhard Berger	McLaren-Honda
- Time: 1:17.227

Fastest lap
Driver	(France) Alain Prost	Ferrari
- Time: 1:17.958 on lap 58

Podium
First	(France) Alain Prost	Ferrari
Second	(United Kingdom) Nigel Mansell	Ferrari
Third	(Austria) Gerhard Berger	McLaren-Honda

The 1990 Mexican Grand Prix was a Formula One motor race held at Autodromo Hermanos Rodriguez on 24 June 1990. It was the sixth race of the 1990 Formula One World Championship, the 14th Mexican Grand Prix and the fifth since the Mexico City circuit returned to the Formula One calendar in 1986. It was held over 69 laps of the 4.4 kilometre circuit for a race distance of 305 kilometres.

The race was won by reigning world champion, French driver Alain Prost driving a Ferrari 641. Prost, the 1988 race winner, became the second multiple-winner in Mexican Grand Prix history, joining British driver Jim Clark who won the race in 1962 (non-championship), 1963 and 1967. It was Prost's second win of the year after the Brazilian Grand Prix. Prost won the race by 26 seconds over his British teammate Nigel Mansell. Third was Austrian driver Gerhard Berger driving a McLaren MP4/5B. Ayrton Senna stopped with a puncture late in the race, allowing both Prost and Berger to close to eight points behind him in the Driver's Championship. The one-two finish for Ferrari at this race would be the last for the team until the 1998 French Grand Prix.

Ferrari would wait a further 34 years until their next win in Mexico was secured in 2024 by Carlos Sainz Jr.

This was the last race of the season to be held in the continent of North America.

== Qualifying ==
=== Pre-qualifying report ===
During the Friday morning pre-qualifying session, Olivier Grouillard was fastest for the first time this season, in the Osella. The Larrousse-Lolas of Éric Bernard and Aguri Suzuki were second and fourth, with the EuroBrun of Roberto Moreno between them in third place.

For the third Grand Prix in succession, the AGS cars missed out in fifth and sixth positions, with Yannick Dalmas faster than Gabriele Tarquini this time. AGS technical director Hugues de Chaunac left the team prior to this event, frustrated at the team's lack of progress. Seventh again was Bertrand Gachot in the Coloni, although he was much closer to the pace on this occasion, just three tenths of a second behind Tarquini. Claudio Langes was a distant eighth again after only completing the minimum three laps required by the regulations, as the team concentrated on Moreno. Bottom of the time sheets as usual was Bruno Giacomelli in the Life, only managing an out-lap before his engine failed. Team manager Sergio Barbasio confirmed that his engineers were working on converting the L190 chassis to run with the Judd CV engines he now claimed to have bought from Lotus.

=== Pre-qualifying classification ===
Pos	No	Driver	Constructor	Time	Gap
1	14	(France) Olivier Grouillard	Osella-Ford	1:25.281	—
2	29	(France) Éric Bernard	Lola-Lamborghini	1:25.456	+0.175
3	33	(Brazil) Roberto Moreno	EuroBrun-Judd	1:26.724	+1.443
4	30	(Japan) Aguri Suzuki	Lola-Lamborghini	1:27.511	+2.230
5	18	(France) Yannick Dalmas	AGS-Ford	1:27.830	+2.549
6	17	(Italy) Gabriele Tarquini	AGS-Ford	1:28.499	+3.218
7	31	(Belgium) Bertrand Gachot	Coloni-Subaru	1:28.805	+3.524
8	34	(Italy) Claudio Langes	EuroBrun-Judd	1:40.414	+15.133
9	39	(Italy) Bruno Giacomelli	Life	4:07.475	+2:42.194

=== Qualifying report ===
There were no driver changes as the F1 show moved to Mexico City. The weather was changeable during the weekend, catching some drivers out, with both of the Larrousse team's drivers having major accidents on the Saturday morning. Despite that, both Aguri Suzuki and Éric Bernard managed to qualify for the race. The Leyton House drivers Ivan Capelli and Maurício Gugelmin both failed to qualify. At the front of the grid, Gerhard Berger took pole from Riccardo Patrese, Ayrton Senna, Nigel Mansell, Thierry Boutsen, Jean Alesi, Pierluigi Martini, Nelson Piquet, Satoru Nakajima, and Stefano Modena, with championship contender Alain Prost, not happy with the qualifying set up of his Ferrari so deciding instead to qualify with his race set up, 13th. Roberto Moreno was disqualified for receiving a push start in qualifying.

=== Qualifying classification ===
Pos	No	Driver	Constructor	Q1	Q2	Gap
1	28	(Austria) Gerhard Berger	McLaren-Honda	1:17.227	1:17.850	—
2	6	(Italy) Riccardo Patrese	Williams-Renault	1:18.215	1:17.498	+0.271
3	27	(Brazil) Ayrton Senna	McLaren-Honda	1:18.417	1:17.670	+0.443
4	2	(United Kingdom) Nigel Mansell	Ferrari	1:17.938	1:17.732	+0.505
5	5	(Belgium) Thierry Boutsen	Williams-Renault	1:19.062	1:17.883	+0.656
6	4	(France) Jean Alesi	Tyrrell-Ford	1:18.727	1:18.282	+1.055
7	23	(Italy) Pierluigi Martini	Minardi-Ford	1:18.526	1:18.590	+1.299
8	20	(Brazil) Nelson Piquet	Benetton-Ford	1:19.022	1:18.561	+1.334
9	3	(Japan) Satoru Nakajima	Tyrrell-Ford	1:19.551	1:18.575	+1.348
10	8	(Italy) Stefano Modena	Brabham-Judd	1:18.592	1:19.817	+1.365
11	11	(United Kingdom) Derek Warwick	Lotus-Lamborghini	1:19.557	1:18.951	+1.724
12	12	(United Kingdom) Martin Donnelly	Lotus-Lamborghini	1:19.769	1:18.994	+1.767
13	1	(France) Alain Prost	Ferrari	1:19.378	1:19.026	+1.799
14	19	(Italy) Alessandro Nannini	Benetton-Ford	1:19.909	1:19.227	+2.000
15	22	(Italy) Andrea de Cesaris	Dallara-Ford	1:21.635	1:19.865	+2.638
16	24	(Italy) Paolo Barilla	Minardi-Ford	1:19.897	1:21.242	+2.670
17	9	(Italy) Michele Alboreto	Arrows-Ford	1:21.212	1:19.941	+2.714
18	21	(Italy) Emanuele Pirro	Dallara-Ford	1:21.067	1:20.044	+2.817
19	30	(Japan) Aguri Suzuki	Lola-Lamborghini	1:21.077	1:20.268	+3.041
20	14	(France) Olivier Grouillard	Osella-Ford	1:20.274	1:21.167	+3.047
21	7	(Australia) David Brabham	Brabham-Judd	1:20.447	1:20.636	+3.220
22	26	(France) Philippe Alliot	Ligier-Ford	1:21.451	1:20.657	+3.430
23	35	(Switzerland) Gregor Foitek	Onyx-Ford	1:21.012	1:21.400	+3.785
24	25	(Italy) Nicola Larini	Ligier-Ford	1:21.584	1:21.116	+3.889
25	29	(France) Éric Bernard	Lola-Lamborghini	1:21.273	1:21.677	+4.046
26	36	(Finland) JJ Lehto	Onyx-Ford	1:21.519	1:21.687	+4.292
27	16	(Italy) Ivan Capelli	Leyton House-Judd	1:23.639	1:21.544	+4.317
28	15	(Brazil) Maurício Gugelmin	Leyton House-Judd	1:22.612	1:21.665	+4.438
29	10	(Italy) Alex Caffi	Arrows-Ford	1:22.278	1:22.154	+4.927
EX	33	(Brazil) Roberto Moreno	EuroBrun-Judd	1:21.142	no time	+3.915

== Race ==
=== Race report ===
Sunshine greeted the drivers on race day and at the start it was Patrese who got away from Senna, Berger, Boutsen, and Piquet. Senna and Berger both passed Patrese on lap 2, and the McLaren drivers opened a significant lead over the rest of the field. Prost was charging through the field from his poor grid position, while Piquet moved up to third. Berger's run in second place came to an early end when he had to stop for new tyres on lap 13, leaving Piquet in second but under pressure from his former team-mate Nigel Mansell, who was able to pass him soon afterwards. Prost continued his charge through the field, eventually taking second from Mansell with 15 laps to go. Prost proceeded to set off after Senna, who was beginning to slow with tyre problems. The Brazilian had gambled on tyre durability by not making a stop for fresh rubber. On lap 60, Prost got past Senna with a simple move and three laps later Senna's rear tyre exploded, forcing him to retire from his 100th Grand Prix. As he had completed over 90% of the race, he was classified as a finisher in 20th place, the lowest classified result of his career. The battle for second place between Mansell and Berger culminated in Mansell passing around the outside of Berger going into the ultra-fast Peraltada corner. Mansell thus finished second behind Prost, with Berger third from Alessandro Nannini, Boutsen, and Piquet.

=== Race classification ===
Pos	No	Driver	Constructor	Laps	Time/Retired	Grid	Points
1	1	(France) Alain Prost	Ferrari	69	1:32:35.783	13	9
2	2	(United Kingdom) Nigel Mansell	Ferrari	69	+ 25.351	4	6
3	28	(Austria) Gerhard Berger	McLaren-Honda	69	+ 25.530	1	4
4	19	(Italy) Alessandro Nannini	Benetton-Ford	69	+ 41.099	14	3
5	5	(Belgium) Thierry Boutsen	Williams-Renault	69	+ 46.669	5	2
6	20	(Brazil) Nelson Piquet	Benetton-Ford	69	+ 46.943	8	1
7	4	(France) Jean Alesi	Tyrrell-Ford	69	+ 49.077	6	
8	12	(United Kingdom) Martin Donnelly	Lotus-Lamborghini	69	+ 1:06.142	12	
9	6	(Italy) Riccardo Patrese	Williams-Renault	69	+ 1:09.918	2	
10	11	(United Kingdom) Derek Warwick	Lotus-Lamborghini	68	+ 1 lap	11	
11	8	(Italy) Stefano Modena	Brabham-Judd	68	+ 1 lap	10	
12	23	(Italy) Pierluigi Martini	Minardi-Ford	68	+ 1 lap	7	
13	22	(Italy) Andrea de Cesaris	Dallara-Ford	68	+ 1 lap	15	
14	24	(Italy) Paolo Barilla	Minardi-Ford	67	+ 2 laps	16	
15	35	(Switzerland) Gregor Foitek	Onyx-Ford	67	+ 2 laps	23	
16	25	(Italy) Nicola Larini	Ligier-Ford	67	+ 2 laps	24	
17	9	(Italy) Michele Alboreto	Arrows-Ford	66	+ 3 laps	17	
18	26	(France) Philippe Alliot	Ligier-Ford	66	+ 3 laps	22	
19	14	(France) Olivier Grouillard	Osella-Ford	65	+ 4 laps	20	
20	27	(Brazil) Ayrton Senna	McLaren-Honda	63	Tyre	3	
Ret	36	(Finland) JJ Lehto	Onyx-Ford	26	Engine	26	
Ret	29	(France) Éric Bernard	Lola-Lamborghini	12	Brakes	25	
Ret	30	(Japan) Aguri Suzuki	Lola-Lamborghini	11	Collision	19	
Ret	3	(Japan) Satoru Nakajima	Tyrrell-Ford	11	Collision	9	
Ret	7	(Australia) David Brabham	Brabham-Judd	11	Electrical	21	
Ret	21	(Italy) Emanuele Pirro	Dallara-Ford	10	Engine	18	
EX	33	(Brazil) Roberto Moreno	EuroBrun-Judd		Push start		
DNQ	16	(Italy) Ivan Capelli	Leyton House-Judd				
DNQ	15	(Brazil) Maurício Gugelmin	Leyton House-Judd				
DNQ	10	(Italy) Alex Caffi	Arrows-Ford				
DNPQ	18	(France) Yannick Dalmas	AGS-Ford				
DNPQ	17	(Italy) Gabriele Tarquini	AGS-Ford				
DNPQ	31	(Belgium) Bertrand Gachot	Coloni-Subaru				
DNPQ	34	(Italy) Claudio Langes	EuroBrun-Judd				
DNPQ	39	(Italy) Bruno Giacomelli	Life				

== Championship standings after the race ==
Drivers' Championship standings

Pos	Driver	Points
1	(Brazil) Ayrton Senna	31
2	(France) Alain Prost	23
3	(Austria) Gerhard Berger	23
4	(France) Jean Alesi	13
5	(United Kingdom) Nigel Mansell	13

Constructors' Championship standings

Pos	Constructor	Points
1	(United Kingdom) McLaren-Honda	54
2	(Italy) Ferrari	36
3	(United Kingdom) Williams-Renault	20
4	(United Kingdom) Benetton-Ford	20
5	(United Kingdom) Tyrrell-Ford	14

- Note: Only the top five positions are included for both sets of standings.

Previous race: 1990 Canadian Grand Prix	FIA Formula One World Championship; 1990 season	Next race: 1990 French Grand Prix
Previous race: 1989 Mexican Grand Prix	Mexican Grand Prix	Next race: 1991 Mexican Grand Prix
