= Franco Scapini =

Italian racing driver

Franco Scapini (born April 7, 1962) is a former Italian racing driver from Varese.

== European racing ==
Scapini was passionate about cars and technology from an early age, because he attended his father's workshop, where racing cars were prepared and classic cars were restored. He began to frequent the racetracks with his father and also to have the first experiences with go-karts. After racing go-karts for three years, he began his professional career in 1981 in the Italian F.Fiat Abarth Championship, having suffered from a serious accident at Imola. Once recovered from the accident he joined the F2000 Championship immediately getting a fourth and a third place. After these results, the team gave him the opportunity to debut in F3 at Mugello European Formula Three Championship. Without any sponsor's support he participated in partial seasons there until 1983, but always with excellent results, being always among the fastest drivers with a very aggressive but profitable driving. Much appreciated by the team's engineers for his technical skills in the development of the chassis and engines, he moved to Italian Formula Three in 1984 and finished fourth in the series points with three wins for the Automotor team. In 1984, he was awarded the coveted Autosprint gold medal (famous international motorsport newspaper) for sporting and competitive merits. Following is successes in 1984, he remained in the same team as well in 1985, spending a large part of the season testing and developing the electronic injection system on the VW Brabham-Judd factory engine and also a system of special air shock absorbers on the flat-bottomed Ralt RT30, devoid of coil springs, but another serious accident put an end to his season. Shortly supported by sponsors he participated in a partial season of Formula 3000 in 1986 with little success. In 1987, he came back to Italian F3 with Automotor, Coloni and Euroteam and also became a test driver for Minardi in F1. In 1988 he made one more Formula 3000 start as well as making his only American Racing Series appearance. In 1989, he returned to F3000 for two more starts and also drove the Mussato Lancia LC2-Ferrari in the World Sport Prototype Championship. In 1990, he signed on as the official test and reserve driver for the Life team in Formula One, however, as the team only had a single chassis, he reportedly only drove in few practice sessions. The Life team and car was a colossal failure and failed to pre-qualify for the first 14 events of the 1990 Formula One season before the team shut down. In 1991 he has the American experience in the IndyCar Championship with the Euromotorsport Lola-Cosworth DFS. Later he decided to prepare a Ferrari F355 for the GT3 category and he did it independently with his own company, the Supertech Racing team. He deserves credit for having brought Ferrari cars back to compete in international GT championships and endurance races such as the 24 Hours of Daytona. And this has probably convinced Ferrari to reconsider the importance of GT racing for sporting customers. At the wheel of the Ferrari F355 GT3, he raced in the French, Spanish and Italian GT Championships, with some good results in the top three and two wins, before retiring to become a racing instructor and F1 Powerboat team manager for the D.A.C. Racing team winning two European Championships, 8 World Championships and two World speed records. He is currently involved in motorsport management and collaborates as a motorsport technical commentator with a major European pay per view network. He also manages a small executive flight company owned by him and he often personally flies planes of this company

== American racing ==
Scapini made one CART IndyCar World Series start for Euromotorsport in 1991 at Surfers Paradise where he finished a surprising 11th, good enough for two points and 28th in series points. He later competed in two Grand-Am events in 1999 and 2000 driving a Ferrari F355. Both events were the Daytona 24 Hours race. His best finish was 12th in class (1999).

== Career results ==
Season	Series	Team name	Races	Poles	Wins	Points	Final Placing
1981	European Formula Three	Ermolli	1	0	0	0	NC
1982	European Formula Three	Mario Crugnola	4	0	0	0	NC
1982	Italian Formula Three	Mario Crugnola	11	0	0	7	10th
1983	European Formula Three	Cesare Gariboldi	1	0	0	0	NC
1983	Italian Formula Three	Cesare Gariboldi; Team Merzario	8	0	0	8	10th
1984	Italian Formula Three	Elf Alloni; Automotor Racing	10	2	2	34	4th
1985	Italian Formula Three	Automotor Racing	12	0	0	7	11th
1986	International Formula 3000	Italia 3000; Lola Motorsport	4	0	0	0	NC
1987	Italian Formula Three	Automotor; Coloni Racing; Euroteam	10	0	0	1	20th
1988	International Formula 3000	Italia 3000; Lola Motorsport	1	0	0	0	NC
1988	Indy Lights	TEAMKAR International	1	0	0	2	28th
1989	International Formula 3000	Automotive BVM	2	0	0	0	NC
1990	Formula One	Life F1	Test driver				
1991	CART World Series	Euromotorsports	1	0	0	2	28th
1997	Ferrari Challenge - Italy	Motor	8	0	0	?	7th
1998	French GT Championship	S.B. Racing Supertech	2	0	0	0	NC
1999	Spanish GT Championship	Supertech	5	1	0	0	NC

=== Complete International Formula 3000 results ===
(key) (Races in bold indicate pole position; races in italics indicate fastest lap.)

Year	Entrant	1	2	3	4	5	6	7	8	9	10	11	DC	Points
1986	Corbari Italia Italia F3000	SIL; 17	VAL; Ret	PAU; DNQ	SPA; DNQ	IMO; DNQ	MUG						NC	0
1986	Lola Motorsport							PER; Ret	ÖST; 13	BIR	BUG	JAR	NC	0
1988	Cowman Racing	JER; DNQ	VAL; 15	PAU; DNQ	SIL; DNQ	MNZ; DNQ	PER; DNQ	BRH	BIR; DNQ	BUG	ZOL	DIJ	NC	0
1989	Automotive / BVM	SIL	VAL	PAU	JER; DNQ	PER; Ret	BRH; DNQ	BIR; 10	SPA; DNQ	BUG; DNQ	DIJ		NC	0

=== Complete CART/Indycar results ===
(key) (Races in bold indicate pole position)

Year	Team	1	2	3	4	5	6	7	8	9	10	11	12	13	14	15	16	17	Rank	Points	Ref
1991	Euromotorsports	SRF; 11	LBH	PHX	INDY	MIL	DET	POR	CLE	MEA	TOR	MIS	DEN	VAN	MDO	ROA	NAZ	LS	28th	2	

=== Complete Indy Lights results ===
(key)

Year	Team	Series	1	2	3	4	5	6	7	8	9	10	11	12	Rank	Points
1988	TEAMKAR International	ARS	PHX	MIL	POR	CLE	TOR	MEA	POC	MDO	ROA	NAZ	LS	MIA; 11	28th	2

=== Complete 24 Hours of Le Mans results ===
Class winners in bold. Cars failing to complete 70% of the winner's distance marked as Not Classified (NC).

Year	Pos	Class	No	Team	Drivers	Chassis	Tyre	Laps
Year	Pos	Class	No	Team	Drivers	Engine	Tyre	Laps
1989	DNQ	C1	26	(Italy) Mussato Action Car	(Italy) Almo Coppelli (Austria) Ernst Franzmaier	Lancia LC2	**D**	-
1989	DNQ	C1	26	(Italy) Mussato Action Car	(Italy) Almo Coppelli (Austria) Ernst Franzmaier	Ferrari 308C 3.0L Turbo V8	**D**	-
