= 1990 Italian Grand Prix =

- Race 12 of 16 in the 1990 Formula One World Championship
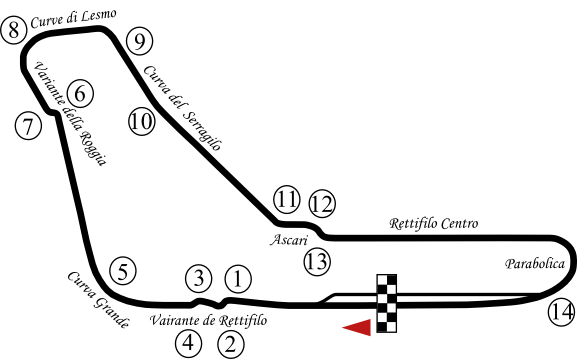

Race details
- Date: 9 September 1990
- Official name: Coca-Cola 61º Gran Premio d'Italia
- Location: Autodromo Nazionale di Monza; Monza, Lombardy, Italy
- Course: Permanent racing facility
- Course length: 5.800 km (3.604 miles)
- Distance: 53 laps, 307.400 km (191.009 miles)
- Weather: Hot, dry, sunny

Pole position
Driver	(Brazil) Ayrton Senna	McLaren-Honda
- Time: 1:22.533

Fastest lap
Driver	(Brazil) Ayrton Senna	McLaren-Honda
- Time: 1:26.254 on lap 46

Podium
First	(Brazil) Ayrton Senna	McLaren-Honda
Second	(France) Alain Prost	Ferrari
Third	(Austria) Gerhard Berger	McLaren-Honda

The 1990 Italian Grand Prix (formally the Coca-Cola 61º Gran Premio d'Italia) was a Formula One motor race held at Monza on 9 September 1990. It was the twelfth race of the 1990 Formula One World Championship. The race was the 60th Italian Grand Prix and the 55th to be held at Monza.

The 53-lap race was won by Brazilian driver Ayrton Senna, driving a McLaren-Honda. Senna took pole position, led every lap and set the fastest race lap, thus achieving a Grand Slam. Senna's Driver's Championship rival, Frenchman Alain Prost, finished second in his Ferrari, some six seconds behind, with Senna's Austrian teammate Gerhard Berger third.

The win enabled Senna to extend his lead over Prost in the Drivers' Championship to 16 points with four races remaining.

== Qualifying ==
=== Pre-qualifying report ===
The Friday morning pre-qualifying session at Monza followed a similar pattern to the previous race at Spa, with the same four drivers progressing to the main qualifying sessions. Olivier Grouillard was fastest again in the Osella, his tenth pre-qualification from twelve attempts. Bertrand Gachot achieved his best pre-qualifying position of the season so far in second place in the Coloni, his second success at this stage. The AGS cars both pre-qualified again in third and fourth, with Gabriele Tarquini outpacing Yannick Dalmas this time.

Therefore the same three cars missed out on pre-qualification, namely the two EuroBruns and the Life. Fifth again was the EuroBrun of Roberto Moreno, just under six tenths of a second slower than Dalmas, although Claudio Langes was nearly 6.5 seconds further adrift in the sister car. Bruno Giacomelli was 20 seconds further behind in the Life, having only managed two laps at the team's home event before a substantial engine failure. It was the last appearance for their unusual, but hugely underdeveloped W12 engine.

=== Pre-qualifying classification ===
Pos	No	Driver	Constructor	Time	Gap
1	14	(France) Olivier Grouillard	Osella-Ford	1:26.947	—
2	31	(Belgium) Bertrand Gachot	Coloni-Ford	1:27.594	+0.647
3	17	(Italy) Gabriele Tarquini	AGS-Ford	1:27.773	+0.826
4	18	(France) Yannick Dalmas	AGS-Ford	1:28.113	+1.166
5	33	(Brazil) Roberto Moreno	EuroBrun-Judd	1:28.703	+1.756
6	34	(Italy) Claudio Langes	EuroBrun-Judd	1:35.061	+8.114
7	39	(Italy) Bruno Giacomelli	Life	1:55.244	+28.297

=== Qualifying classification ===
Pos	No	Driver	Constructor	Q1	Q2	Gap
1	27	(Brazil) Ayrton Senna	McLaren-Honda	1:22.972	1:22.533	—
2	1	(France) Alain Prost	Ferrari	1:23.497	1:22.935	+0.402
3	28	(Austria) Gerhard Berger	McLaren-Honda	1:23.239	1:22.936	+0.403
4	2	(United Kingdom) Nigel Mansell	Ferrari	1:23.141	1:23.720	+0.608
5	4	(France) Jean Alesi	Tyrrell-Ford	1:24.159	1:23.526	+0.993
6	5	(Belgium) Thierry Boutsen	Williams-Renault	1:24.042	1:23.984	+1.451
7	6	(Italy) Riccardo Patrese	Williams-Renault	1:24.253	1:24.555	+1.720
8	19	(Italy) Alessandro Nannini	Benetton-Ford	1:25.567	1:24.583	+2.050
9	20	(Brazil) Nelson Piquet	Benetton-Ford	1:24.699	1:24.987	+2.166
10	15	(Brazil) Maurício Gugelmin	Leyton House-Judd	1:26.170	1:25.556	+3.023
11	12	(United Kingdom) Martin Donnelly	Lotus-Lamborghini	1:26.110	1:25.629	+3.096
12	11	(United Kingdom) Derek Warwick	Lotus-Lamborghini	1:25.728	1:25.677	+3.144
13	29	(France) Éric Bernard	Lola-Lamborghini	1:25.927	1:26.154	+3.394
14	3	(Japan) Satoru Nakajima	Tyrrell-Ford	1:26.449	1:26.081	+3.548
15	23	(Italy) Pierluigi Martini	Minardi-Ford	1:26.330	1:26.516	+3.797
16	16	(Italy) Ivan Capelli	Leyton House-Judd	1:26.712	1:26.735	+4.179
17	8	(Italy) Stefano Modena	Brabham-Judd	1:26.950	1:27.997	+4.417
18	30	(Japan) Aguri Suzuki	Lola-Lamborghini	1:27.074	1:26.962	+4.429
19	21	(Italy) Emanuele Pirro	Dallara-Ford	1:27.790	1:26.964	+4.431
20	26	(France) Philippe Alliot	Ligier-Ford	1:27.153	1:27.043	+4.510
21	10	(Italy) Alex Caffi	Arrows-Ford	1:27.828	1:27.410	+4.877
22	9	(Italy) Michele Alboreto	Arrows-Ford	1:27.784	1:27.448	+4.915
23	14	(France) Olivier Grouillard	Osella-Ford	1:27.541	1:28.228	+5.008
24	18	(France) Yannick Dalmas	AGS-Ford	1:28.564	1:27.673	+5.140
25	22	(Italy) Andrea de Cesaris	Dallara-Ford	1:27.772	1:27.749	+5.216
26	25	(Italy) Nicola Larini	Ligier-Ford	1:28.626	1:27.937	+5.404
27	17	(Italy) Gabriele Tarquini	AGS-Ford	1:28.107	1:28.256	+5.574
28	24	(Italy) Paolo Barilla	Minardi-Ford	1:28.258	1:28.521	+5.725
29	7	(Australia) David Brabham	Brabham-Judd	1:28.382	1:30.446	+5.849
30	31	(Belgium) Bertrand Gachot	Coloni-Ford	1:28.952	1:30.140	+6.419

== Race ==
=== Race report ===
Near the end of the first lap, Derek Warwick ran wide at the Parabolica, his Lotus hitting the guard rail at around 140 mph (230 km/h) and flipping upside down. Warwick clambered out of the car unhurt. The race was stopped on the second lap and restarted over the original distance, with Warwick taking the spare car and eventually retiring with a clutch failure. Jean Alesi became the first retirement as he went off Variante del Rettifilo on lap 5 and hit the wall, as the Lotus of Martin Donnelly had a dramatic engine failure at the start of lap 14. And Alboreto in the Arrows spun off at Ascari with only 1 lap to go.

=== Race classification ===
Pos	No	Driver	Constructor	Laps	Time/Retired	Grid	Points
1	27	(Brazil) Ayrton Senna	McLaren-Honda	53	1:17:57.878	1	9
2	1	(France) Alain Prost	Ferrari	53	+ 6.054	2	6
3	28	(Austria) Gerhard Berger	McLaren-Honda	53	+ 7.404	3	4
4	2	(United Kingdom) Nigel Mansell	Ferrari	53	+ 56.219	4	3
5	6	(Italy) Riccardo Patrese	Williams-Renault	52	+ 1:25.274	7	2
6	3	(Japan) Satoru Nakajima	Tyrrell-Ford	52	+ 1 lap	14	1
7	20	(Brazil) Nelson Piquet	Benetton-Ford	52	+ 1 lap	9	
8	19	(Italy) Alessandro Nannini	Benetton-Ford	52	+ 1 lap	8	
9	10	(Italy) Alex Caffi	Arrows-Ford	51	+ 2 laps	21	
10	22	(Italy) Andrea de Cesaris	Dallara-Ford	51	+ 2 laps	25	
11	25	(Italy) Nicola Larini	Ligier-Ford	51	+ 2 laps	26	
12	9	(Italy) Michele Alboreto	Arrows-Ford	50	Spun off	22	
13	26	(France) Philippe Alliot	Ligier-Ford	50	+ 3 laps	20	
NC	18	(France) Yannick Dalmas	AGS-Ford	45	+ 8 laps	24	
Ret	16	(Italy) Ivan Capelli	Leyton House-Judd	36	Engine	16	
Ret	30	(Japan) Aguri Suzuki	Lola-Lamborghini	36	Electrical	18	
Ret	14	(France) Olivier Grouillard	Osella-Ford	27	Wheel bearing	23	
Ret	15	(Brazil) Maurício Gugelmin	Leyton House-Judd	24	Engine	10	
Ret	8	(Italy) Stefano Modena	Brabham-Judd	21	Engine	17	
Ret	5	(Belgium) Thierry Boutsen	Williams-Renault	18	Suspension	6	
Ret	11	(United Kingdom) Derek Warwick	Lotus-Lamborghini	15	Clutch	12	
Ret	21	(Italy) Emanuele Pirro	Dallara-Ford	14	Spun off	19	
Ret	12	(United Kingdom) Martin Donnelly	Lotus-Lamborghini	13	Engine	11	
Ret	29	(France) Éric Bernard	Lola-Lamborghini	10	Clutch	13	
Ret	23	(Italy) Pierluigi Martini	Minardi-Ford	7	Suspension	15	
Ret	4	(France) Jean Alesi	Tyrrell-Ford	4	Spun off	5	
DNQ	17	(Italy) Gabriele Tarquini	AGS-Ford				
DNQ	24	(Italy) Paolo Barilla	Minardi-Ford				
DNQ	7	(Australia) David Brabham	Brabham-Judd				
DNQ	31	(Belgium) Bertrand Gachot	Coloni-Ford				
DNPQ	33	(Brazil) Roberto Moreno	EuroBrun-Judd				
DNPQ	34	(Italy) Claudio Langes	EuroBrun-Judd				
DNPQ	39	(Italy) Bruno Giacomelli	Life				

== Championship standings after the race ==
Drivers' Championship standings

Pos	Driver	Points
1	(Brazil) Ayrton Senna	72
2	(France) Alain Prost	56
3	(Austria) Gerhard Berger	37
4	(Belgium) Thierry Boutsen	27
5	(Brazil) Nelson Piquet	24

Constructors' Championship standings

Pos	Constructor	Points
1	(United Kingdom) McLaren-Honda	109
2	(Italy) Ferrari	72
3	(United Kingdom) Williams-Renault	44
4	(United Kingdom) Benetton-Ford	40
5	(United Kingdom) Tyrrell-Ford	15

- Note: Only the top five positions are included for both sets of standings.

Previous race: 1990 Belgian Grand Prix	FIA Formula One World Championship; 1990 season	Next race: 1990 Portuguese Grand Prix
Previous race: 1989 Italian Grand Prix	Italian Grand Prix	Next race: 1991 Italian Grand Prix
