= 1990 Brazilian Grand Prix =

- Race 2 of 16 in the 1990 Formula One World Championship

Race details
- Date: 25 March 1990
- Official name: XIX Grande Prêmio do Brasil
- Location: Autódromo José Carlos Pace; São Paulo, Brazil
- Course: Permanent racing facility
- Course length: 4.325 km (2.687 miles)
- Distance: 71 laps, 307.075 km (190.808 miles)
- Weather: Hot, dry, sunny

Pole position
Driver	(Brazil) Ayrton Senna	McLaren-Honda
- Time: 1:17.277

Fastest lap
Driver	(Austria) Gerhard Berger	McLaren-Honda
- Time: 1:19.899 on lap 55

Podium
First	(France) Alain Prost	Ferrari
Second	(Austria) Gerhard Berger	McLaren-Honda
Third	(Brazil) Ayrton Senna	McLaren-Honda

The 1990 Brazilian Grand Prix was a Formula One motor race held at Interlagos, São Paulo on 25 March 1990. It was the second race of the 1990 Formula One World Championship. It was also the first Brazilian Grand Prix to be held at Interlagos since 1980, following the renovation and shortening of the circuit and the ascendancy of São Paulo driver Ayrton Senna.

The 71-lap race was won by Alain Prost, driving a Ferrari. Senna took pole position in his McLaren-Honda and led until he collided with Satoru Nakajima in the Tyrrell-Ford, allowing Prost through. Prost took his 40th Grand Prix victory, and his sixth and final Brazilian win, with Senna's teammate Gerhard Berger second and Senna himself recovering to third.

== Background ==
The rebuilt Interlagos circuit, which hosted the race for the first time since 1980, had been dramatically altered. The track had been shortened by 3.5 km and lost many fast sweepers and the Retao straight, which had allowed Formula One drivers to use full throttle for 20 seconds.

== Qualifying ==
=== Pre-qualifying report ===
In the Friday morning pre-qualifying session, the Larrousse-Lola cars secured a 1–2, with Éric Bernard a couple of tenths of a second faster than his team-mate Aguri Suzuki. Five thousandths of a second behind Suzuki in third was Olivier Grouillard in the Osella. The other pre-qualifier was Yannick Dalmas in his AGS, the first time the Frenchman had progressed to the main qualifying sessions this season. Dalmas edged out his team-mate Gabriele Tarquini, who was fifth, the fastest runner to drop out at this stage.

Roberto Moreno also missed out in sixth in an eventful session. His EuroBrun suffered an ignition problem just 200 metres after leaving the pitlane and the team decided to let Moreno use the car of his team-mate Claudio Langes, who at that stage had the sixth best time. Moreno promised Langes he would return the car for the last 10 minutes of the session. Moreno managed a fast lap that placed him at the top of the pre-qualifying table at that point, with a time of 1:25.763. But as he attempted a second fast lap straight afterwards, the car stopped on the track, because the team had miscalculated the fuel quantity needed for two fast laps and the EuroBrun ran out of fuel. Moreno's hope of progressing to qualifying proper ended as the track dried up, and in the final minutes of the session he was bumped down to sixth place. Langes never got back in the car, and was ultimately thirteen seconds adrift of Moreno's time in eighth place.

Bertrand Gachot struggled badly again in the Coloni, faster than Langes but still ten seconds off Bernard's pace in seventh. The Coloni's Subaru 1235 engine, built by Motori Moderni, was proving to be overweight, underpowered and fragile. Bottom of the time sheets was Gary Brabham in the Life, failing to post a time at all. The car's engine broke a connecting rod after a quarter of a lap, leaving Brabham and his manager to question the Australian's future at the team. Brabham later stated that he had been uncertain his team would even be present at Interlagos, until he saw the car in the pit garage.

=== Pre-qualifying classification ===
Pos	No	Driver	Constructor	Time	Gap
1	29	(France) Éric Bernard	Lola-Lamborghini	1:23.763	—
2	30	(Japan) Aguri Suzuki	Lola-Lamborghini	1:23.982	+0.219
3	14	(France) Olivier Grouillard	Osella-Ford	1:23.987	+0.224
4	18	(France) Yannick Dalmas	AGS-Ford	1:24.015	+0.252
5	17	(Italy) Gabriele Tarquini	AGS-Ford	1:24.265	+0.502
6	33	(Brazil) Roberto Moreno	EuroBrun-Judd	1:25.763	+2.000
7	31	(Belgium) Bertrand Gachot	Coloni-Subaru	1:34.046	+10.283
8	34	(Italy) Claudio Langes	EuroBrun-Judd	1:39.188	+15.425
9	39	(Australia) Gary Brabham	Life	no time	—

=== Qualifying report ===
Local hero Ayrton Senna took his 43rd career pole position and led from the start. Gianni Morbidelli made it through qualifying for the first time in his Formula One career.

=== Qualifying classification ===
Pos	No	Driver	Constructor	Q1	Q2	Gap
1	27	(Brazil) Ayrton Senna	McLaren-Honda	1:17.769	1:17.277	—
2	28	(Austria) Gerhard Berger	McLaren-Honda	1:17.888	1:18.504	+0.611
3	5	(Belgium) Thierry Boutsen	Williams-Renault	1:18.375	1:18.150	+0.873
4	6	(Italy) Riccardo Patrese	Williams-Renault	1:18.465	1:18.288	+1.011
5	2	(United Kingdom) Nigel Mansell	Ferrari	1:18.509	1:19.475	+1.232
6	1	(France) Alain Prost	Ferrari	1:18.631	1:18.884	+1.354
7	4	(France) Jean Alesi	Tyrrell-Ford	1:19.230	1:18.923	+1.646
8	23	(Italy) Pierluigi Martini	Minardi-Ford	1:19.039	1:19.688	+1.762
9	22	(Italy) Andrea de Cesaris	Dallara-Ford	1:19.125	1:19.964	+1.848
10	26	(France) Philippe Alliot	Ligier-Ford	1:19.309	—	+2.032
11	29	(France) Éric Bernard	Lola-Lamborghini	1:19.406	1:21.024	+2.129
12	8	(Italy) Stefano Modena	Brabham-Judd	1:19.425	1:20.126	+2.148
13	20	(Brazil) Nelson Piquet	Benetton-Ford	1:19.629	1:20.317	+2.352
14	12	(United Kingdom) Martin Donnelly	Lotus-Lamborghini	1:20.032	—	+2.755
15	19	(Italy) Alessandro Nannini	Benetton-Ford	1:20.055	1:20.317	+2.778
16	21	(Italy) Gianni Morbidelli	Dallara-Ford	1:20.164	1:20.229	+2.887
17	24	(Italy) Paolo Barilla	Minardi-Ford	1:20.282	1:21.121	+3.005
18	30	(Japan) Aguri Suzuki	Lola-Lamborghini	1:20.557	1:21.086	+3.280
19	3	(Japan) Satoru Nakajima	Tyrrell-Ford	1:20.568	1:21.086	+3.291
20	25	(Italy) Nicola Larini	Ligier-Ford	1:20.650	1:20.794	+3.373
21	14	(France) Olivier Grouillard	Osella-Ford	1:21.292	1:20.884	+3.607
22	7	(Switzerland) Gregor Foitek	Brabham-Judd	1:20.965	1:20.902	+3.625
23	9	(Italy) Michele Alboreto	Arrows-Ford	1:20.920	1:21.002	+3.643
24	11	(United Kingdom) Derek Warwick	Lotus-Lamborghini	1:21.244	1:20.998	+3.721
25	10	(Italy) Alex Caffi	Arrows-Ford	1:21.065	1:22.057	+3.788
26	18	(France) Yannick Dalmas	AGS-Ford	1:22.426	1:21.087	+3.810
27	35	(Sweden) Stefan Johansson	Onyx-Ford	1:21.241	1:22.184	+3.964
28	36	(Finland) JJ Lehto	Onyx-Ford	1:21.323	1:21.417	+4.046
29	16	(Italy) Ivan Capelli	Leyton House-Judd	1:21.383	1:21.422	+4.106
30	15	(Brazil) Maurício Gugelmin	Leyton House-Judd	1:21.616	1:22.862	+4.339

== Race ==
=== Race report ===
After qualifying, Williams driver Thierry Boutsen, himself third on the grid, predicted that the Ferraris on the third row of the grid would be the cars to beat, citing their semi-automatic transmission and its paddle shift which allowed both Alain Prost and Nigel Mansell to keep their hands on the wheel around the bumpy turns at the back of the circuit

At the first corner, Jean Alesi, Riccardo Patrese and Andrea de Cesaris tangled, eliminating de Cesaris. Also in the first corner Alessandro Nannini tangled with Philippe Alliot and requiring the Benetton driver to stop for a new nosecone. On lap eight Boutsen passed Berger for second place, and Prost took the V12 Ferrari past the McLaren driver on lap 17. Mansell pitted on lap 27 for new tyres and also to inspect a broken rollbar, rejoining in 9th place. Boutsen's pit stop on lap 30 went disastrously wrong. With failing brakes, and a tricky bump in the pitlane, the Williams was unable to stop and crashed into some of his mechanics and the wheel and tyre equipment stacked outside the garage. This required a new nosecone and when he rejoined, he was down in 11th position.

Prost was piling on the pressure, and by lap 35 he had climbed to second within 10 seconds of Senna, and was now ahead of Riccardo Patrese, Berger and Nelson Piquet. When Senna came up to lap former Lotus teammate Satoru Nakajima, there was contact and the McLaren had to pit for a new nosecone. He rejoined and challenged hard, but the reduced downforce levels made the car difficult to drive. On lap 66, Patrese retired with a broken oil cooler.

Prost took his 40th victory, and his first for Ferrari, from Berger and the recovering Senna. Mansell finished an excellent fourth, having driven through the field with a broken rollbar. Boutsen finished a creditable fifth and Piquet claimed the final point in front of his home crowd after passing Alesi – who was suffering severe tyre wear after attempting to run non-stop on his Pirellis – on the last lap.

=== Race classification ===
Pos	No	Driver	Constructor	Laps	Time/Retired	Grid	Points
1	1	(France) Alain Prost	Ferrari	71	1:37:21.258	6	9
2	28	(Austria) Gerhard Berger	McLaren-Honda	71	+13.564	2	6
3	27	(Brazil) Ayrton Senna	McLaren-Honda	71	+37.722	1	4
4	2	(United Kingdom) Nigel Mansell	Ferrari	71	+47.266	5	3
5	5	(Belgium) Thierry Boutsen	Williams-Renault	70	+1 lap	3	2
6	20	(Brazil) Nelson Piquet	Benetton-Ford	70	+1 lap	13	1
7	4	(France) Jean Alesi	Tyrrell-Ford	70	+1 lap	7	
8	3	(Japan) Satoru Nakajima	Tyrrell-Ford	70	+1 lap	19	
9	23	(Italy) Pierluigi Martini	Minardi-Ford	69	+2 laps	8	
10	19	(Italy) Alessandro Nannini	Benetton-Ford	68	Puncture	15	
11	25	(Italy) Nicola Larini	Ligier-Ford	68	+3 laps	20	
12	26	(France) Philippe Alliot	Ligier-Ford	68	+3 laps	10	
13	6	(Italy) Riccardo Patrese	Williams-Renault	65	Oil pressure	4	
14	21	(Italy) Gianni Morbidelli	Dallara-Ford	64	+7 laps	16	
Ret	10	(Italy) Alex Caffi	Arrows-Ford	49	Clutch	25	
Ret	12	(United Kingdom) Martin Donnelly	Lotus-Lamborghini	43	Spun off	14	
Ret	8	(Italy) Stefano Modena	Brabham-Judd	39	Spun off	12	
Ret	24	(Italy) Paolo Barilla	Minardi-Ford	38	Engine	17	
Ret	18	(France) Yannick Dalmas	AGS-Ford	28	Suspension	26	
Ret	11	(United Kingdom) Derek Warwick	Lotus-Lamborghini	25	Electrical	24	
Ret	30	(Japan) Aguri Suzuki	Lola-Lamborghini	24	Suspension	18	
Ret	9	(Italy) Michele Alboreto	Arrows-Ford	24	Suspension	23	
Ret	7	(Switzerland) Gregor Foitek	Brabham-Judd	14	Transmission	22	
Ret	29	(France) Éric Bernard	Lola-Lamborghini	13	Gearbox	11	
Ret	14	(France) Olivier Grouillard	Osella-Ford	8	Collision	21	
Ret	22	(Italy) Andrea de Cesaris	Dallara-Ford	0	Collision	9	
DNQ	35	(Sweden) Stefan Johansson	Onyx-Ford				
DNQ	36	(Finland) JJ Lehto	Onyx-Ford				
DNQ	16	(Italy) Ivan Capelli	Leyton House-Judd				
DNQ	15	(Brazil) Maurício Gugelmin	Leyton House-Judd				
DNPQ	17	(Italy) Gabriele Tarquini	AGS-Ford				
DNPQ	33	(Brazil) Roberto Moreno	EuroBrun-Judd				
DNPQ	31	(Belgium) Bertrand Gachot	Coloni-Subaru				
DNPQ	34	(Italy) Claudio Langes	EuroBrun-Judd				
DNPQ	39	(Australia) Gary Brabham	Life				

== Championship standings after the race ==
Drivers' Championship standings

Pos	Driver	Points
1	(Brazil) Ayrton Senna	13
2	(France) Alain Prost	9
3	(France) Jean Alesi	6
4	(Austria) Gerhard Berger	6
5	(Belgium) Thierry Boutsen	6

Constructors' Championship standings

Pos	Constructor	Points
1	(United Kingdom) McLaren-Honda	19
2	(Italy) Ferrari	12
3	(United Kingdom) Tyrrell-Ford	7
4	(United Kingdom) Williams-Renault	6
5	(United Kingdom) Benetton-Ford	4

- Note: Only the top five positions are included for both sets of standings.

Previous race: 1990 United States Grand Prix	FIA Formula One World Championship; 1990 season	Next race: 1990 San Marino Grand Prix
Previous race: 1989 Brazilian Grand Prix; Previous race at Interlagos: 1980 Brazilian Grand Prix	Brazilian Grand Prix	Next race: 1991 Brazilian Grand Prix
