= 1990 Portuguese Grand Prix =

- Race 13 of 16 in the 1990 Formula One World Championship
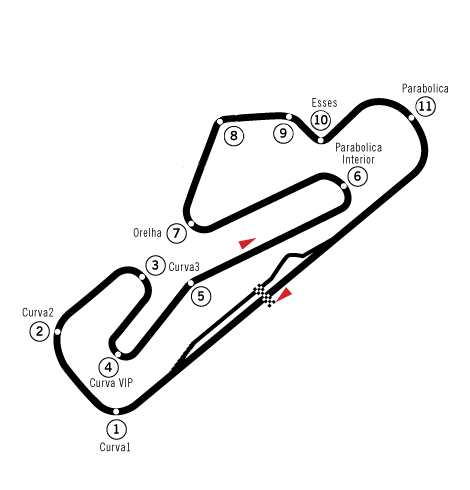

Race details
- Date: 23 September 1990
- Official name: XIX Grande Premio de Portugal
- Location: Autódromo do Estoril; Estoril, Portugal
- Course: Permanent racing facility
- Course length: 4.350 km (2.703 miles)
- Distance: 61 laps, 265.35 km (164.88 miles)
- Scheduled distance: 71 laps, 308.85 km (191.91 miles)

Pole position
Driver	(United Kingdom) Nigel Mansell	Ferrari
- Time: 1:13.557

Fastest lap
Driver	(Italy) Riccardo Patrese	Williams-Renault
- Time: 1:18.306 on lap 56

Podium
First	(United Kingdom) Nigel Mansell	Ferrari
Second	(Brazil) Ayrton Senna	McLaren-Honda
Third	(France) Alain Prost	Ferrari

The 1990 Portuguese Grand Prix was a Formula One motor race held on 23 September 1990 at Autódromo do Estoril. It was the thirteenth race of the 1990 FIA Formula One World Championship. The race was the 19th Portuguese Grand Prix and the seventh to be held at Estoril. It was scheduled to be held over 71 laps of the 4.35-kilometre (2.70 mi) circuit but was stopped after 61 laps, a race distance of 265.35 kilometres (164.88 mi), after an accident involving the Arrows of Alex Caffi and the Lola of Aguri Suzuki.

Nigel Mansell took pole position in his Ferrari and was leading when the race was stopped, thus taking his only victory of the season and his last for the Ferrari team. Mansell finished 2.8 seconds ahead of Drivers' Championship leader Ayrton Senna in the McLaren-Honda, who in turn finished 1.3 seconds ahead of rival Alain Prost in the other Ferrari. Senna thus extended his lead over Prost to 18 points with three races remaining.

This also marked the first race in which an effective traction control system was used in Formula One. Scuderia Ferrari used the system on Prost's Ferrari 641; which gave the Frenchman an eventual third-place podium finish. Mansell's 641 was also equipped with the same traction control system; however, the Englishman decided to switch his system off for the race. Nonetheless, he still won the race.

== Qualifying ==
=== Pre-qualifying report ===
The Friday morning pre-qualifying session produced a similar result to the previous two races, with the same four cars pre-qualifying, albeit in a slightly different order. Olivier Grouillard was fastest for the third time in a row in the Osella, half a second ahead of the AGS of Yannick Dalmas. Now a regular pre-qualifier after the disastrous period with the Subaru engine, Bertrand Gachot was third fastest in the Coloni, nearly a second ahead of Gabriele Tarquini in the other AGS.

This left the now-usual trio missing out on pre-qualification. The two EuroBruns of Robert Moreno and Claudio Langes were again fifth and sixth, with Langes more than two seconds slower than his team-mate as the team began to lose touch with their rivals. The Life team had finally abandoned their unreliable and vastly underpowered W12 engine, and had fitted the L190 with a well-used Judd CV V8. It had taken ten days to modify the chassis, and the car was now 80 kg lighter. But the engine cover now did not fit properly, and it flew off on Bruno Giacomelli's shakedown lap, halfway through the session. It was slightly damaged and the team had no replacement, so no further running was possible.

=== Pre-qualifying classification ===
Pos	No	Driver	Constructor	Time	Gap
1	14	(France) Olivier Grouillard	Osella-Ford	1:19.384	—
2	18	(France) Yannick Dalmas	AGS-Ford	1:19.885	+0.501
3	31	(Belgium) Bertrand Gachot	Coloni-Ford	1:20.000	+0.616
4	17	(Italy) Gabriele Tarquini	AGS-Ford	1:20.942	+1.558
5	33	(Brazil) Roberto Moreno	EuroBrun-Judd	1:21.188	+1.804
6	34	(Italy) Claudio Langes	EuroBrun-Judd	1:23.447	+4.063
7	39	(Italy) Bruno Giacomelli	Life-Judd	no time	—

=== Qualifying report ===
Tyrrell's Satoru Nakajima qualified 20th but withdrew due to influenza after crashing in the Sunday morning warm-up session. The grid was adjusted accordingly, although only 25 drivers started as no non-qualifier was reinstated.

=== Qualifying classification ===
Pos	No	Driver	Constructor	Q1	Q2	Gap
1	2	(United Kingdom) Nigel Mansell	Ferrari	1:14.861	1:13.557	—
2	1	(France) Alain Prost	Ferrari	1:14.536	1:13.595	+0.038
3	27	(Brazil) Ayrton Senna	McLaren-Honda	1:14.246	1:13.601	+0.044
4	28	(Austria) Gerhard Berger	McLaren-Honda	1:14.552	1:14.292	+0.735
5	6	(Italy) Riccardo Patrese	Williams-Renault	1:15.539	1:14.723	+1.166
6	20	(Brazil) Nelson Piquet	Benetton-Ford	1:15.542	1:14.728	+1.171
7	5	(Belgium) Thierry Boutsen	Williams-Renault	1:15.646	1:14.934	+1.377
8	4	(France) Jean Alesi	Tyrrell-Ford	1:16.092	1:15.112	+1.555
9	19	(Italy) Alessandro Nannini	Benetton-Ford	1:16.123	1:15.411	+1.854
10	29	(France) Éric Bernard	Lola-Lamborghini	1:16.477	1:15.673	+2.116
11	30	(Japan) Aguri Suzuki	Lola-Lamborghini	1:17.189	1:16.012	+2.455
12	16	(Italy) Ivan Capelli	Leyton House-Judd	1:18.242	1:16.284	+2.727
13	21	(Italy) Emanuele Pirro	Dallara-Ford	1:17.653	1:16.290	+2.733
14	15	(Brazil) Maurício Gugelmin	Leyton House-Judd	1:17.569	1:16.296	+2.739
15	12	(United Kingdom) Martin Donnelly	Lotus-Lamborghini	1:17.414	1:16.762	+3.205
16	23	(Italy) Pierluigi Martini	Minardi-Ford	1:17.045	1:16.795	+3.238
17	10	(Italy) Alex Caffi	Arrows-Ford	1:18.725	1:16.946	+3.389
18	22	(Italy) Andrea de Cesaris	Dallara-Ford	1:17.252	1:17.066	+3.509
19	9	(Italy) Michele Alboreto	Arrows-Ford	1:18.630	1:17.081	+3.524
20	3	(Japan) Satoru Nakajima	Tyrrell-Ford	1:17.097	no time	+3.540
21	26	(France) Philippe Alliot	Ligier-Ford	1:17.330	1:17.120	+3.563
22	11	(United Kingdom) Derek Warwick	Lotus-Lamborghini	1:17.904	1:17.259	+3.702
23	25	(Italy) Nicola Larini	Ligier-Ford	1:18.958	1:17.269	+3.712
24	8	(Italy) Stefano Modena	Brabham-Judd	1:17.962	1:17.341	+3.784
25	18	(France) Yannick Dalmas	AGS-Ford	1:18.581	1:17.621	+4.064
26	7	(Australia) David Brabham	Brabham-Judd	1:18.967	1:17.715	+4.158
27	14	(France) Olivier Grouillard	Osella-Ford	1:18.512	1:17.775	+4.218
28	24	(Italy) Paolo Barilla	Minardi-Ford	1:18.669	1:18.280	+4.723
29	17	(Italy) Gabriele Tarquini	AGS-Ford	1:20.226	1:18.815	+5.258
30	31	(Belgium) Bertrand Gachot	Coloni-Ford	1:20.662	1:20.516	+6.959

== Race ==
=== Race report ===
At the start, with both Ferraris on the front row (Mansell on pole, Alain Prost second), Mansell got too much wheelspin and slid across the track towards Prost, who had to avoid being shunted into the pitwall. All of this allowed the McLarens of Ayrton Senna and Gerhard Berger to slip past Mansell and Prost to make it a McLaren 1–2 with Senna leading into the first corner. After all the mid race tyre stops, it was Senna who emerged as the race leader, followed by Mansell, Berger, and Prost. A few laps later Mansell had caught Senna and passed him into turn one (Senna letting him through, unlike the year before when they collided).

On lap 52, race leader Nigel Mansell was attempting to lap the Ligier JS33B of Philippe Alliot when the Frenchman stuck to the racing line by driving inches in front of Mansell into the inside of "Curva 2" corner. However, the right rear wheel of his car hit the left front of Mansell's Ferrari and Alliot was sent spinning into the Armco barrier. Mansell came out unscathed from this incident, and eventually won the race which was stopped early due to an accident between Suzuki and Caffi.

Ferrari announced that Jean Alesi would partner Alain Prost for 1991. Alesi was reported to have already signed a contract with Williams, but changed his mind when Ferrari showed an interest, feeling that this would give him a better chance of winning a championship.

By winning this race, Mansell tied Stirling Moss' longstanding record of most F1 Grand Prix wins without a Drivers' Championship, at 16. Mansell would then extend it to 29 across the next two years, until finally clinching the title at the 1992 Hungarian Grand Prix, at which point Moss would have that record handed back to him.

=== Race classification ===
Pos	No	Driver	Constructor	Laps	Time/Retired	Grid	Points
1	2	(United Kingdom) Nigel Mansell	Ferrari	61	1:22:11.014	1	9
2	27	(Brazil) Ayrton Senna	McLaren-Honda	61	+ 2.808	3	6
3	1	(France) Alain Prost	Ferrari	61	+ 4.189	2	4
4	28	(Austria) Gerhard Berger	McLaren-Honda	61	+ 5.896	4	3
5	20	(Brazil) Nelson Piquet	Benetton-Ford	61	+ 57.418	6	2
6	19	(Italy) Alessandro Nannini	Benetton-Ford	61	+ 58.249	9	1
7	6	(Italy) Riccardo Patrese	Williams-Renault	60	+ 1 lap	5	
8	4	(France) Jean Alesi	Tyrrell-Ford	60	+ 1 lap	8	
9	9	(Italy) Michele Alboreto	Arrows-Ford	60	+ 1 lap	19	
10	25	(Italy) Nicola Larini	Ligier-Ford	59	+ 2 laps	22	
11	23	(Italy) Pierluigi Martini	Minardi-Ford	59	+ 2 laps	16	
12	15	(Brazil) Maurício Gugelmin	Leyton House-Judd	59	+ 2 laps	14	
13	10	(Italy) Alex Caffi	Arrows-Ford	58	Collision	17	
14	30	(Japan) Aguri Suzuki	Lola-Lamborghini	58	Collision	11	
15	21	(Italy) Emanuele Pirro	Dallara-Ford	58	+ 3 laps	13	
Ret	26	(France) Philippe Alliot	Ligier-Ford	52	Accident	20	
Ret	7	(Australia) David Brabham	Brabham-Judd	52	Gearbox	25	
Ret	16	(Italy) Ivan Capelli	Leyton House-Judd	51	Engine	12	
Ret	5	(Belgium) Thierry Boutsen	Williams-Renault	30	Engine	7	
Ret	29	(France) Éric Bernard	Lola-Lamborghini	24	Gearbox	10	
Ret	8	(Italy) Stefano Modena	Brabham-Judd	21	Gearbox	23	
Ret	12	(United Kingdom) Martin Donnelly	Lotus-Lamborghini	14	Alternator	15	
Ret	11	(United Kingdom) Derek Warwick	Lotus-Lamborghini	5	Throttle	21	
Ret	18	(France) Yannick Dalmas	AGS-Ford	3	Halfshaft	24	
Ret	22	(Italy) Andrea de Cesaris	Dallara-Ford	0	Spun off	18	
DNS	3	(Japan) Satoru Nakajima	Tyrrell-Ford		Driver unwell		
DNQ	14	(France) Olivier Grouillard	Osella-Ford				
DNQ	24	(Italy) Paolo Barilla	Minardi-Ford				
DNQ	17	(Italy) Gabriele Tarquini	AGS-Ford				
DNQ	31	(Belgium) Bertrand Gachot	Coloni-Ford				
DNPQ	33	(Brazil) Roberto Moreno	EuroBrun-Judd				
DNPQ	34	(Italy) Claudio Langes	EuroBrun-Judd				
DNPQ	39	(Italy) Bruno Giacomelli	Life-Judd				

== Championship standings after the race ==
Drivers' Championship standings

Pos	Driver	Points
1	(Brazil) Ayrton Senna	78
2	(France) Alain Prost	60
3	(Austria) Gerhard Berger	40
4	(Belgium) Thierry Boutsen	27
5	(Brazil) Nelson Piquet	26

Constructors' Championship standings

Pos	Constructor	Points
1	(United Kingdom) McLaren-Honda	118
2	(Italy) Ferrari	85
3	(United Kingdom) Williams-Renault	44
4	(United Kingdom) Benetton-Ford	43
5	(United Kingdom) Tyrrell-Ford	15

- Note: Only the top five positions are included for both sets of standings.

Previous race: 1990 Italian Grand Prix	FIA Formula One World Championship; 1990 season	Next race: 1990 Spanish Grand Prix
Previous race: 1989 Portuguese Grand Prix	Portuguese Grand Prix	Next race: 1991 Portuguese Grand Prix
