= Benetton Grand Prix results =

Grand Prix racing results

These are the complete Grand Prix racing results for Benetton Formula.

== Complete Formula One results ==
(key)

Year	Chassis	Engine	Tyres	Drivers	1	2	3	4	5	6	7	8	9	10	11	12	13	14	15	16	17	Points	WCC
1986	B186	BMW M12/13 L4 t	P		BRA	ESP	SMR	MON	BEL	CAN	DET	FRA	GBR	GER	HUN	AUT	ITA	POR	MEX	AUS		19	6th
1986	B186	BMW M12/13 L4 t	P	(Italy) Teo Fabi	10	5	Ret	Ret	7	Ret	Ret	Ret	Ret	Ret	Ret	Ret^{P}	Ret^{P}^{F}	8	Ret	10		19	6th
1986	B186	BMW M12/13 L4 t	P	(Austria) Gerhard Berger	6	6	3	Ret	10	Ret	Ret	Ret	Ret	10^{F}	Ret	7^{F}	5	Ret	1	Ret		19	6th
1987	B187	Ford Cosworth GBA 1.5 V6 t	G		BRA	SMR	BEL	MON	DET	FRA	GBR	GER	HUN	AUT	ITA	POR	ESP	MEX	JPN	AUS		28	5th
1987	B187	Ford Cosworth GBA 1.5 V6 t	G	(Italy) Teo Fabi	Ret	Ret^{F}	Ret	8	Ret	5	6	Ret	Ret	3	7	4	Ret	5	Ret	Ret		28	5th
1987	B187	Ford Cosworth GBA 1.5 V6 t	G	(Belgium) Thierry Boutsen	5	Ret	Ret	Ret	Ret	Ret	7	Ret	4	4	5	14	Ret	Ret	5	3		28	5th
1988	B188	Ford Cosworth DFR 3.5 V8	G		BRA	SMR	MON	MEX	CAN	DET	FRA	GBR	GER	HUN	BEL	ITA	POR	ESP	JPN	AUS		39	3rd
1988	B188	Ford Cosworth DFR 3.5 V8	G	(Italy) Alessandro Nannini	Ret	6	Ret	7	Ret	Ret	6	3	18^{F}	Ret	DSQ	9	Ret	3	5	Ret		39	3rd
1988	B188	Ford Cosworth DFR 3.5 V8	G	(Belgium) Thierry Boutsen	7	4	8	8	3	3	Ret	Ret	6	3	DSQ	6	3	9	3	5		39	3rd
1989	B188; B189	Ford Cosworth DFR 3.5 V8; Ford HBA1 3.5 V8; Ford HBA4 3.5 V8	G		BRA	SMR	MON	MEX	USA	CAN	FRA	GBR	GER	HUN	BEL	ITA	POR	ESP	JPN	AUS		39	4th
1989	B188; B189	Ford Cosworth DFR 3.5 V8; Ford HBA1 3.5 V8; Ford HBA4 3.5 V8	G	(Italy) Alessandro Nannini	6	3	8	4	Ret	DSQ	Ret	3	Ret	Ret	5	Ret	4	Ret	1	2		39	4th
1989	B188; B189	Ford Cosworth DFR 3.5 V8; Ford HBA1 3.5 V8; Ford HBA4 3.5 V8	G	(United Kingdom) Johnny Herbert	4	11	14	15	5	DNQ												39	4th
1989	B188; B189	Ford Cosworth DFR 3.5 V8; Ford HBA1 3.5 V8; Ford HBA4 3.5 V8	G	(Italy) Emanuele Pirro							9	11	Ret	8	10	Ret	Ret	Ret	Ret	5		39	4th
1990	B189B; B190	Ford HBA4 3.5 V8	G		USA	BRA	SMR	MON	CAN	MEX	FRA	GBR	GER	HUN	BEL	ITA	POR	ESP	JPN	AUS		71	3rd
1990	B189B; B190	Ford HBA4 3.5 V8	G	(Italy) Alessandro Nannini	11	10	3^{F}	Ret	Ret	4	16	Ret	2	Ret	4	8	6	3				71	3rd
1990	B189B; B190	Ford HBA4 3.5 V8	G	(Brazil) Roberto Moreno															2	7		71	3rd
1990	B189B; B190	Ford HBA4 3.5 V8	G	(Brazil) Nelson Piquet	4	6	5	DSQ	2	6	4	5	Ret	3	5	7	5	Ret	1	1		71	3rd
1991	B190B; B191	Ford HBA4 3.5 V8; Ford HBA5 3.5 V8	P		USA	BRA	SMR	MON	CAN	MEX	FRA	GBR	GER	HUN	BEL	ITA	POR	ESP	JPN	AUS		38.5	4th
1991	B190B; B191	Ford HBA4 3.5 V8; Ford HBA5 3.5 V8	P	(Brazil) Roberto Moreno	Ret	7	13	4	Ret	5	Ret	Ret	8	8	4^{F}							38.5	4th
1991	B190B; B191	Ford HBA4 3.5 V8; Ford HBA5 3.5 V8	P	(Germany) Michael Schumacher												5	6	6	Ret	Ret		38.5	4th
1991	B190B; B191	Ford HBA4 3.5 V8; Ford HBA5 3.5 V8	P	(Brazil) Nelson Piquet	3	5	Ret	Ret	1	Ret	8	5	Ret	Ret	3	6	5	11	7	4^{‡}		38.5	4th
1992	B191B; B192	Ford HBA5 3.5 V8; Ford HBA7 3.5 V8	G		RSA	MEX	BRA	ESP	SMR	MON	CAN	FRA	GBR	GER	HUN	BEL	ITA	POR	JPN	AUS		91	3rd
1992	B191B; B192	Ford HBA5 3.5 V8; Ford HBA7 3.5 V8	G	(Germany) Michael Schumacher	4	3	3	2	Ret	4	2	Ret	4	3	Ret	1^{F}	3	7	Ret	2^{F}		91	3rd
1992	B191B; B192	Ford HBA5 3.5 V8; Ford HBA7 3.5 V8	G	(United Kingdom) Martin Brundle	Ret	Ret	Ret	Ret	4	5	Ret	3	3	4	5	4	2	4	3	3		91	3rd
1993	B193; B193B	Ford HBA7 3.5 V8; Ford HBA8 3.5 V8	G		RSA	BRA	EUR	SMR	ESP	MON	CAN	FRA	GBR	GER	HUN	BEL	ITA	POR	JPN	AUS		72	3rd
1993	B193; B193B	Ford HBA7 3.5 V8; Ford HBA8 3.5 V8	G	(Germany) Michael Schumacher	Ret	3^{F}	Ret	2	3^{F}	Ret	2^{F}	3^{F}	2	2^{F}	Ret	2	Ret	1	Ret	Ret		72	3rd
1993	B193; B193B	Ford HBA7 3.5 V8; Ford HBA8 3.5 V8	G	(Italy) Riccardo Patrese	Ret	Ret	5	Ret	4	Ret	Ret	10	3	5	2	6	5	16	Ret	8		72	3rd
1994	B194	Ford ECA Zetec-R 3.5 V8	G		BRA	PAC	SMR	MON	ESP	CAN	FRA	GBR	GER	HUN	BEL	ITA	POR	EUR	JPN	AUS		103	2nd
1994	B194	Ford ECA Zetec-R 3.5 V8	G	(Germany) Michael Schumacher	1^{F}	1^{F}	1	1^{P}^{F}	2^{P}^{F}	1^{P}^{F}	1	DSQ	Ret	1^{P}^{F}	DSQ			1^{P}^{F}	2^{P}	Ret^{F}		103	2nd
1994	B194	Ford ECA Zetec-R 3.5 V8	G	(Netherlands) Jos Verstappen	Ret	Ret					Ret	8	Ret	3	3	Ret	5	Ret				103	2nd
1994	B194	Ford ECA Zetec-R 3.5 V8	G	(Finland) JJ Lehto			Ret	7	Ret	6						9	Ret					103	2nd
1994	B194	Ford ECA Zetec-R 3.5 V8	G	(United Kingdom) Johnny Herbert															Ret	Ret		103	2nd
1995	B195	Renault RS7 3.0 V10	G		BRA	ARG	SMR	ESP	MON	CAN	FRA	GBR	GER	HUN	BEL	ITA	POR	EUR	PAC	JPN	AUS	137 (Note: Benetton was not awarded constructor points for Schumacher's win in Brazil as it was deemed to be using illegal fuel.)	1st
1995	B195	Renault RS7 3.0 V10	G	(Germany) Michael Schumacher	1^{F}	3^{F}	Ret^{P}	1^{P}	1	5^{P}^{F}	1^{F}	Ret	1^{F}	11	1	Ret	2	1^{F}	1^{F}	1^{P}^{F}	Ret	137	1st
1995	B195	Renault RS7 3.0 V10	G	(United Kingdom) Johnny Herbert	Ret	4	7	2	4	Ret	Ret	1	4	4	7	1	7	5	6	3	Ret	137	1st
1996	B196	Renault RS8 3.0 V10	G		AUS	BRA	ARG	EUR	SMR	MON	ESP	CAN	FRA	GBR	GER	HUN	BEL	ITA	POR	JPN		68	3rd
1996	B196	Renault RS8 3.0 V10	G	(France) Jean Alesi	Ret	2	3^{F}	Ret	6	Ret^{F}	2	3	3	Ret	2	3	4	2	4	Ret		68	3rd
1996	B196	Renault RS8 3.0 V10	G	(Austria) Gerhard Berger	4	Ret	Ret	9	3	Ret	Ret	Ret	4	2	13	Ret	6^{F}	Ret	6	4		68	3rd
1997	B197	Renault RS9 3.0 V10	G		AUS	BRA	ARG	SMR	MON	ESP	CAN	FRA	GBR	GER	HUN	BEL	ITA	AUT	LUX	JPN	EUR	67	3rd
1997	B197	Renault RS9 3.0 V10	G	(France) Jean Alesi	Ret	6	7	5	Ret	3	2	5	2	6	11	8	2^{P}	Ret	2	5	13	67	3rd
1997	B197	Renault RS9 3.0 V10	G	(Austria) Gerhard Berger	4	2	6^{F}	Ret	9	10				1^{P}^{F}	8	6	7	10	4	8	4	67	3rd
1997	B197	Renault RS9 3.0 V10	G	(Austria) Alexander Wurz							Ret	Ret	3									67	3rd
1998	B198	Playlife GC37-01 3.0 V10	B		AUS	BRA	ARG	SMR	ESP	MON	CAN	FRA	GBR	AUT	GER	HUN	BEL	ITA	LUX	JPN		33	5th
1998	B198	Playlife GC37-01 3.0 V10	B	(Italy) Giancarlo Fisichella	Ret	6	7	Ret	Ret	2	2	9	5	Ret^{P}	7	8	Ret	8	6	8		33	5th
1998	B198	Playlife GC37-01 3.0 V10	B	(Austria) Alexander Wurz	7	4	4^{F}	Ret	4	Ret	4	5	4	9	11	16^{†}	Ret	Ret	7	9		33	5th
1999	B199	Playlife FB01 3.0 V10	B		AUS	BRA	SMR	MON	ESP	CAN	FRA	GBR	AUT	GER	HUN	BEL	ITA	EUR	MAL	JPN		16	6th
1999	B199	Playlife FB01 3.0 V10	B	(Italy) Giancarlo Fisichella	4	Ret	5	5	9	2	Ret	7	12^{†}	Ret	Ret	11	Ret	Ret	11	14^{†}		16	6th
1999	B199	Playlife FB01 3.0 V10	B	(Austria) Alexander Wurz	Ret	7	Ret	6	10	Ret	Ret	10	5	7	7	14	Ret	Ret	8	10		16	6th
2000	B200	Playlife FB02 3.0 V10	B		AUS	BRA	SMR	GBR	ESP	EUR	MON	CAN	FRA	AUT	GER	HUN	BEL	ITA	USA	JPN	MAL	20	4th
2000	B200	Playlife FB02 3.0 V10	B	(Italy) Giancarlo Fisichella	5	2	11	7	9	5	3	3	9	Ret	Ret	Ret	Ret	11	Ret	14	9	20	4th
2000	B200	Playlife FB02 3.0 V10	B	(Austria) Alexander Wurz	7	Ret	9	9	10	12^{†}	Ret	9	Ret	10	Ret	11	13	5	10	Ret	7	20	4th
2001	B201	Renault RS21 3.0 V10	MI		AUS	MAL	BRA	SMR	ESP	AUT	MON	CAN	EUR	FRA	GBR	GER	HUN	BEL	ITA	USA	JPN	10	7th
2001	B201	Renault RS21 3.0 V10	MI	(Italy) Giancarlo Fisichella	13	Ret	6	Ret	14	Ret	Ret	Ret	11	11	13	4	Ret	3	10	8	17^{†}	10	7th
2001	B201	Renault RS21 3.0 V10	MI	(United Kingdom) Jenson Button	14^{†}	11	10	12	15	Ret	7	Ret	13	16^{†}	15	5	Ret	Ret	Ret	9	7	10	7th

Notes

- † – The driver did not finish the Grand Prix, but was classified, as he completed over 90% of the race distance.
- ‡ – Half points awarded as less than 75% of the race distance was completed.
