= Benetton B189 =

Formula One racing car

Benetton B189 Benetton B189B
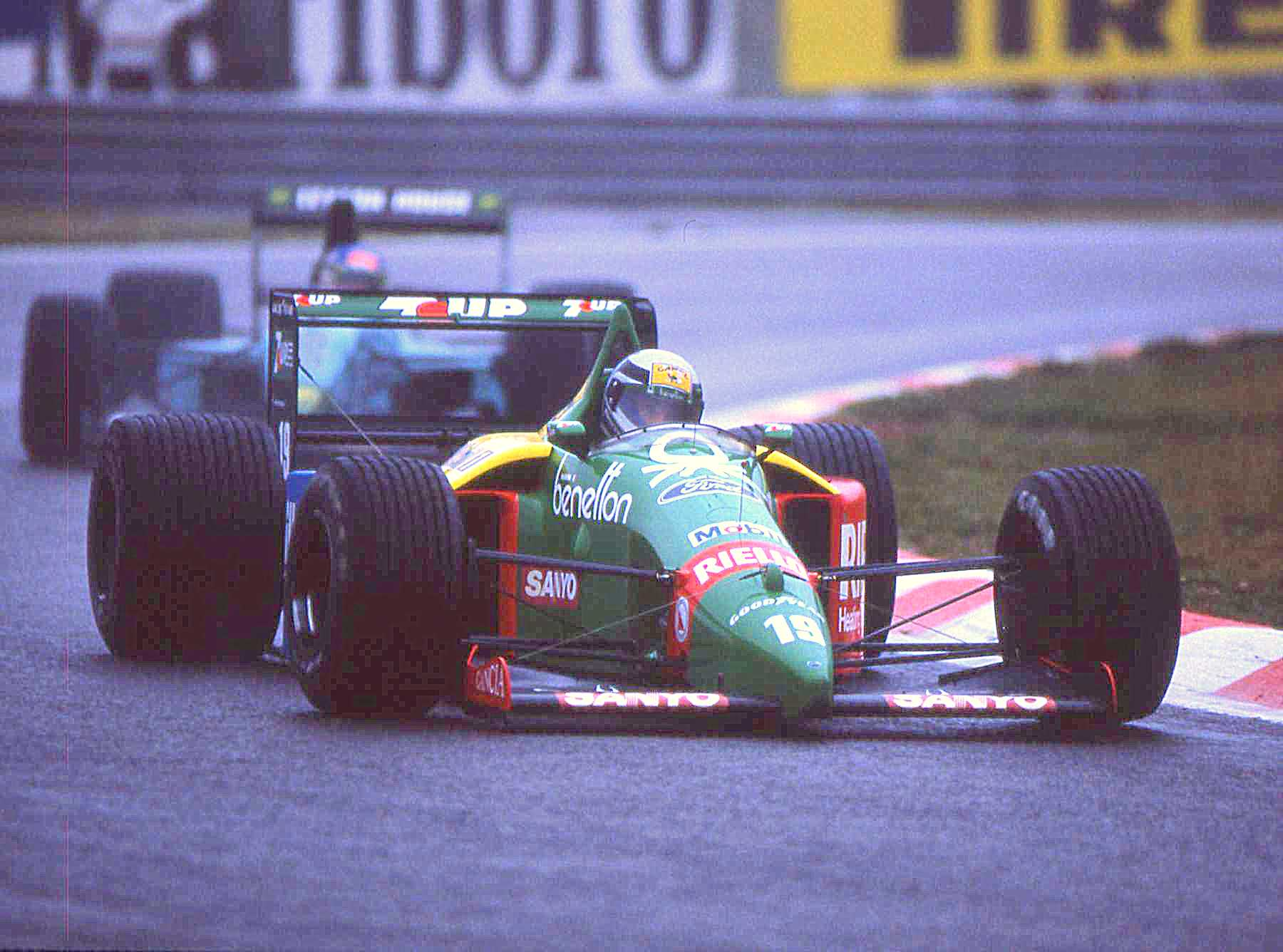
- Alessandro Nannini driving the B189 at the 1989 Belgian Grand Prix.
- Category: Formula One
- Constructor: Benetton
- Designers: Rory Byrne (chassis); Geoff Goddard (engine) (Ford-Cosworth)
- Predecessor: Benetton B188
- Successor: Benetton B190

Technical specifications
- Chassis: Carbon fibre monocoque
- Suspension (front): Double-wishbone, push-rod
- Suspension (rear): Double-wishbone, push-rod
- Engine: 1989: Ford HBA1, 3,498 cc (213.5 cu in), 75° V8, NA, mid-engine, longitudinally-mounted 1989/1990: Ford HBA4, 3,498 cc (213.5 cu in), 75° V8, NA, mid-engine, longitudinally-mounted
- Transmission: Benetton transverse 6-speed manual
- Power: 630-650 hp @ 13,000 rpm
- Fuel: Mobil 1
- Tyres: Goodyear

Competition history
- Notable entrants: Benetton Formula
- Notable drivers: 19. (Italy) Alessandro Nannini; 20. (Italy) Emanuele Pirro; 20. (Brazil) Nelson Piquet
- Debut: 1989 French Grand Prix
- First win: 1989 Japanese Grand Prix
- Last win: 1989 Japanese Grand Prix
- Last event: 1990 United States Grand Prix
Races	Wins	Podiums	Poles	F/Laps
12	1	2	0	0
- Constructors' Championships: 0
- Drivers' Championships: 0

The Benetton B189 is a Formula One racing car designed by Rory Byrne and raced by the Benetton team in the 1989 Formula One season.

== 1989 ==
The car was due to be available from the start of the season but was delayed by various problems as it was designed to take Ford-Cosworth's new HBA1 V8 engine which was in ongoing development. As the HBA1 was a 75° V8 rather than the 90° DFR engine used in the B188, this meant that it was impossible to simply slot in the old engine in order to race the new car. The B189 was also delayed as the team's lead driver Alessandro Nannini had crashed it during testing. This meant that for the first 6 rounds of the season the team was forced to use the B188 until the new car was available. While the B188 was still competitive enough to compete for podium places, the limit of the car and its older engine (which was now in use by other Ford-Cosworth powered teams) had been reached and Benetton was beginning to lag behind the V10 McLaren-Hondas and Williams-Renaults as well as the V12 Ferraris.

The B189 finally appeared at the French Grand Prix where Nannini showed the potential of both the car and the new Ford engine by qualifying 4th ahead of both the Williams-Renaults and the Ferrari of Gerhard Berger. He then ran a strong race in the top three but retired with broken rear suspension on lap 40 that sent him spinning down the escape road at the end of the pit straight, thankfully without hitting the barriers (or Satoru Nakajima's Lotus-Judd which Nannini had been preparing to lap). A second B189 was made available from the German Grand Prix and was driven by McLaren test driver Emanuele Pirro. While still testing for McLaren, Pirro was allowed by McLaren boss Ron Dennis to also test with Benetton and he became highly regarded within the team for his testing abilities.

The B189 got its only win - and Benetton's second ever win - at the 1989 Japanese Grand Prix when Nannini finished 2nd on the road but was awarded the win after McLaren's Ayrton Senna was disqualified. After using the more powerful development HBA4 V8 to qualify in 6th place, he then ran the race-proven HBA1 engine to enhance reliability. He had been third for most of the race, a long way behind the more powerful McLaren-Hondas of Senna and race leader Alain Prost, before their infamous coming together at the Suzuka chicane. Pirro, at the track where he was based as the McLaren test driver, used the development engine in the race and moved quickly from his 22nd starting spot to 10th by lap 33 before being forced out due to a crash with the Dallara of fellow Italian Andrea de Cesaris at the hairpin.

Nannini then finished off the season with a fine second place in the extremely wet Australian Grand Prix in Adelaide while Pirro, in his last race for the team, managed to keep the car on the road (while many of his more experienced rivals failed to do so) and finished 5th for his only points of the season.

== 1990 ==
A modified version of the car, the B189B, raced in the first two races of the 1990 Formula One season. The car was again driven by Alessandro Nannini who was joined at Benetton by three time World Drivers' Champion Nelson Piquet. The B189B was powered by a development of the Ford HBA1 V8, the HBA4.

The B189B was replaced after the second race of the 1990 season by the B190. The B189B was the last Benetton to use the distinctive air intakes on either side of the cockpit, with the B190 having a single airbox in the now standard position above the driver's head.

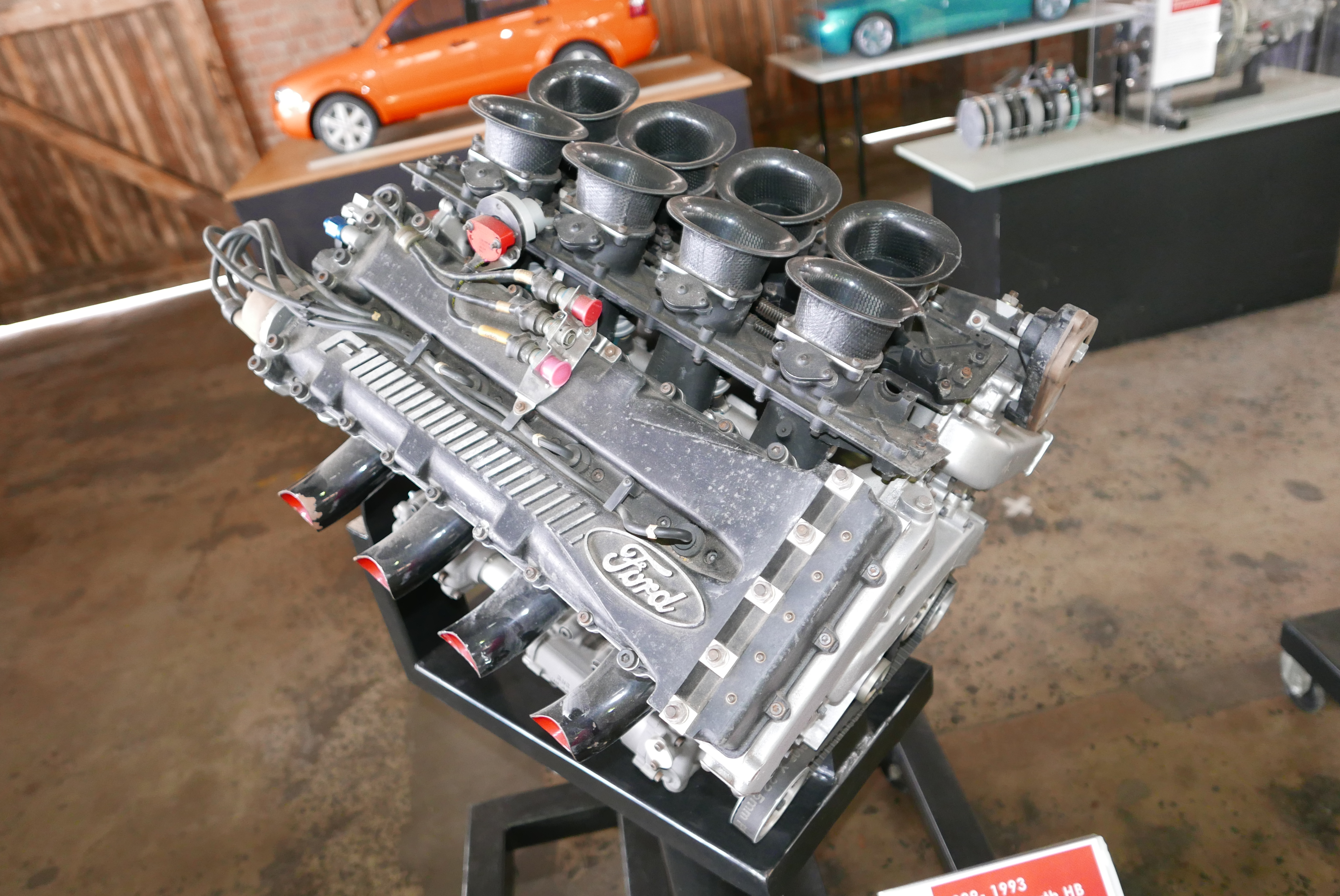
Ford-Cosworth's HBA V8 engine

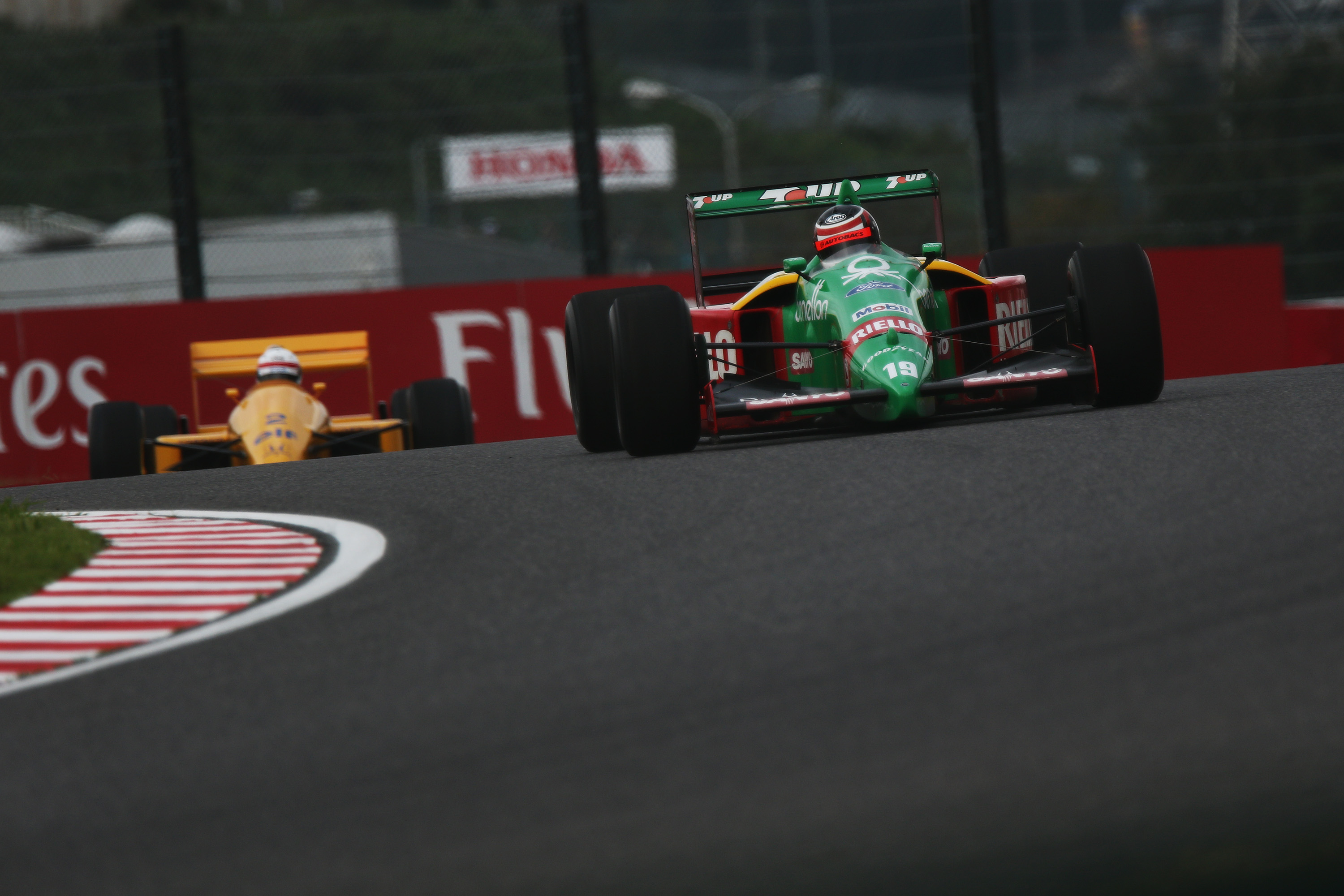
Aguri Suzuki demonstrates the B189 at the 2018 Japanese Grand Prix

== Complete Formula One results ==
(key)

Year	Entrant	Chassis	Engine	Tyres	Driver	1	2	3	4	5	6	7	8	9	10	11	12	13	14	15	16	Pts.	WCC
1989	Benetton Formula Ltd	B189	Ford HBA1 / HBA4; V8	G		BRA	SMR	MON	MEX	USA	CAN	FRA	GBR	GER	HUN	BEL	ITA	POR	ESP	JPN	AUS	39*	4th
1989	Benetton Formula Ltd	B189	Ford HBA1 / HBA4; V8	G	Alessandro Nannini							Ret	3	Ret	Ret	5	Ret	4	Ret	1	2	39*	4th
1989	Benetton Formula Ltd	B189	Ford HBA1 / HBA4; V8	G	Emanuele Pirro									Ret	8	10	Ret	Ret	Ret	Ret	5	39*	4th
1990	Benetton Formula Ltd	B189B	Ford HBA4; V8	G		USA	BRA	SMR	MON	CAN	MEX	FRA	GBR	GER	HUN	BEL	ITA	POR	ESP	JPN	AUS	71**	3rd
1990	Benetton Formula Ltd	B189B	Ford HBA4; V8	G	Alessandro Nannini	11	10															71**	3rd
1990	Benetton Formula Ltd	B189B	Ford HBA4; V8	G	Nelson Piquet	4	6															71**	3rd

* 13 points in 1989 were scored with the B188
** 67 points in 1990 were scored with the B190
