= Benetton B190 =

Formula One racing car

Benetton B190 Benetton B190B
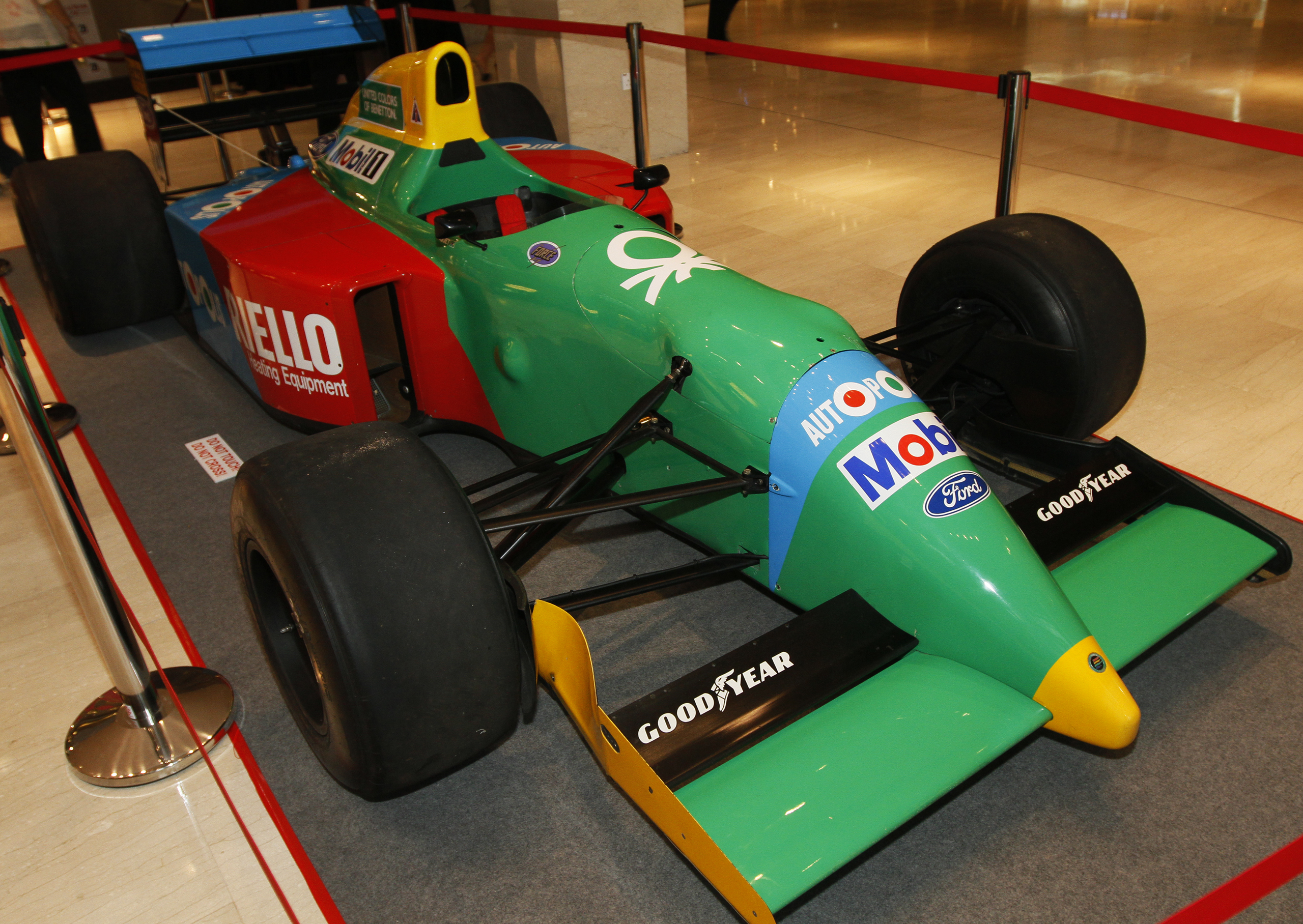
- Benetton B190 (1990)
- Category: Formula One
- Constructor: Benetton
- Designers: John Barnard (Technical Director); Rory Byrne (Chief Designer); Geoff Goddard (Chief Engine Designer) (Ford-Cosworth)
- Predecessor: Benetton B189
- Successor: Benetton B191

Technical specifications
- Chassis: Carbon-fibre monocoque
- Suspension (front): Double-wishbone, push-rod
- Suspension (rear): Double-wishbone, push-rod
- Axle track: Front: 1,816 mm (71.5 in); Rear: 1,680 mm (66 in)
- Wheelbase: 2,870 mm (113.0 in)
- Engine: Ford HBA4, 3,498 cc (213.5 cu in), 75° V8, NA, mid-engine, longitudinally-mounted
- Transmission: Benetton transverse 6-speed manual
- Power: 650 hp @ 13,000 rpm
- Weight: 500 kg (1,102.3 lb)
- Fuel: Mobil
- Tyres: 1990: Goodyear; 1991: Pirelli

Competition history
- Notable entrants: Benetton Formula Ltd; Camel Benetton Ford
- Notable drivers: 19. (Italy) Alessandro Nannini; 19. (Brazil) Roberto Moreno; 20. (Brazil) Nelson Piquet
- Debut: 1990 San Marino Grand Prix
- First win: 1990 Japanese Grand Prix
- Last win: 1990 Australian Grand Prix
- Last event: 1991 Brazilian Grand Prix
Races	Wins	Podiums	Poles	F/Laps
16	2	9	0	1
- Constructors' Championships: 0
- Drivers' Championships: 0

The Benetton B190 is a Formula One racing car designed by Rory Byrne in collaboration with Benetton's Technical Director, John Barnard, a designer with experience at racing companies McLaren and Ferrari and arguably the most successful Formula One designer of the 1980s with his cars winning 31 races since 1981 (Barnard also enjoyed success designing the ground effects Chaparral 2K that won the 1980 Indianapolis 500). Geoff Goddard, chief designer at Cosworth was responsible for designing the car's engine, which was of exclusive use for Benetton. The B190 was raced by Benetton in all but the first two races of the 1990 Formula One season.

== Background ==
Benetton began sponsoring Formula One teams in 1983 with its sponsorship of Tyrrell. In both the 1984 and 1985 seasons, they sponsored the factory Alfa Romeo team. At the end of 1985 Benetton stepped up its involvement in Formula One after acquiring the Toleman and Spirit teams (Benetton had been Toleman's major sponsor in 1985 as well as Alfa). Following the Benetton family's acquisition, Toleman was renamed Benetton Formula in 1986, and with the use of the powerful BMW engines as well as young Austrian driver Gerhard Berger, Benetton became a Grand Prix winner.

South African Rory Byrne, head designer for the team who had designed the Benetton B186 that had given the team its first win, assisted former McLaren and Ferrari designer John Barnard with the design of the B190 (Barnard joined the team in 1990 as its Technical Director). The B190 was the team's first naturally aspirated car to feature the air box located above the drivers head. Its predecessors, the B188 and B189, featured twin air intakes located either side of the cockpit on top of the side pods. This was a carry over from the design of the turbocharged B187 from 1987. All of the cars were designed by Byrne.

== Competition history ==
The B190, which replaced the highly successful B189, utilized the Ford HBA4 V8 engine. As Ford's official team in F1, Benetton were given the latest engine while customer teams had to make do with the older Ford DFR which Benetton had first used in 1988. Through the season, Nelson Piquet and Alessandro Nannini successfully kept the B190 apace with other front runners including the V10 McLaren-Honda's and Williams-Renault's, and Ferrari's V12 with its Semi-automatic transmission, despite the power advantage the multi-cylinder engines had over the Ford V8. Indeed, at some races, the Ford-powered Benettons were as fast in a straight line as the more powerful multi-cylinder engines, the lower weight of the V8 allowing the team to use less downforce which also reduced tyre wear.

The Ford HBA4 V8 engine produced approximately 650 bhp (485 kW; 659 PS) in 1990. This compared to 690 bhp (515 kW; 700 PS) for the Honda V10, 680 bhp (507 kW; 689 PS) for the Ferrari V12 and 660 bhp (492 kW; 669 PS) for the Renault V10 (the old Ford DFR engine was rated at only 620 bhp (462 kW; 629 PS)). What the HBA4 lacked in power to the multi-cylinder engines was generally made up by being smaller and lighter than its main competitors, giving it a lower centre of gravity (weight distribution) which offered a significant handling benefit. The Ford V8 had less frictional losses and therefore thermal discharge than its rivals, meaning less plumbing and smaller radiators could be used, significantly increasing the aerodynamic efficiency of the B190 and improving its co-efficient of drag, which explains the very competitive straight line speed of the B190 in 1990.

After placing third in the Spanish Grand Prix, the popular, chain-smoking Italian Nannini was seriously injured in a helicopter crash near his home in Siena, Italy. The crash severed his right forearm, putting a premature end to a promising Formula One career (doctors were able to re-attach the limb using Micro-surgery and Nannini has since regained partial use of it). On Piquet's recommendation, he was replaced by Brazilian driver Roberto Moreno for the last two Grand Prix races.

Piquet won the final two races of the season, including a 1–2 finish for Piquet and Moreno at the controversial Japanese Grand Prix. During the season's last race in Adelaide, Australia (the 500th World Championship Grand Prix held since it all began in 1950), Piquet won after holding off former Williams teammate Nigel Mansell who was racing in a Ferrari. During the race morning warm up in Australia, Piquet's B190 was the fastest car on the 900-metre-long Brabham Straight at 287 km/h (178 mph) (although this was significantly slower than the 320 km/h (199 mph) seen from the turbo powered cars of 1985–1988, the Piquet's fastest race lap time, the second fastest of the race behind only Mansell, was comfortably under the lap record for Adelaide that had been set in 1987 by Gerhard Berger in a 900 bhp (671 kW; 912 PS) Ferrari).

The 18 points gained from the last two races saw Piquet move to third in the Drivers' Championship, behind the year's champion Ayrton Senna (McLaren) and runner-up Alain Prost (Ferrari), and the team was awarded third place in the Constructors' Championship, again behind McLaren and Ferrari.

== B190B ==
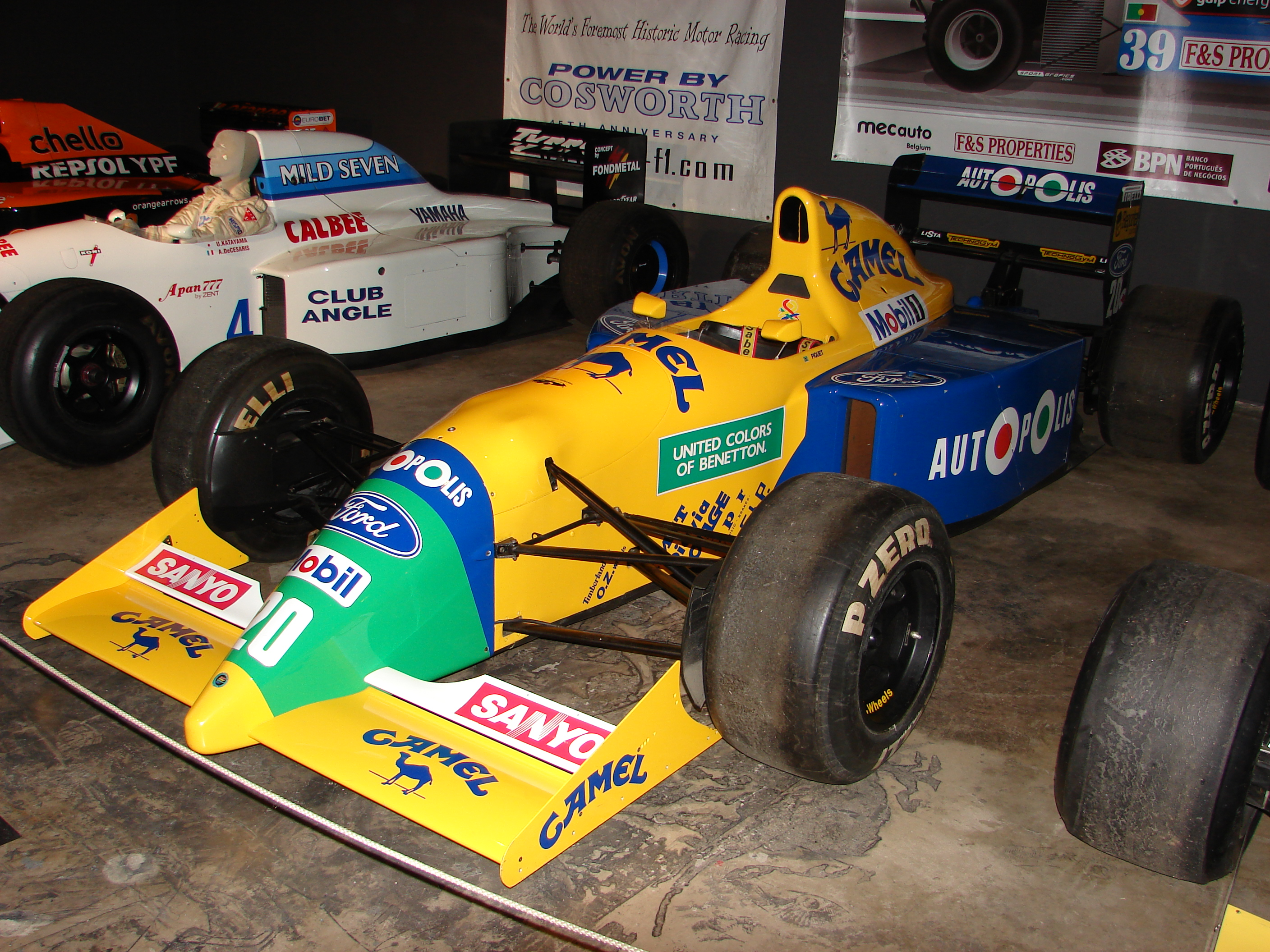
Benetton B190B (1991)

The B190 was updated for the first two races of the 1991 season and was dubbed the B190B. This updated model was subsequently replaced for the 1991 San Marino Grand Prix by the first "nose-up" car for the team, the B191.

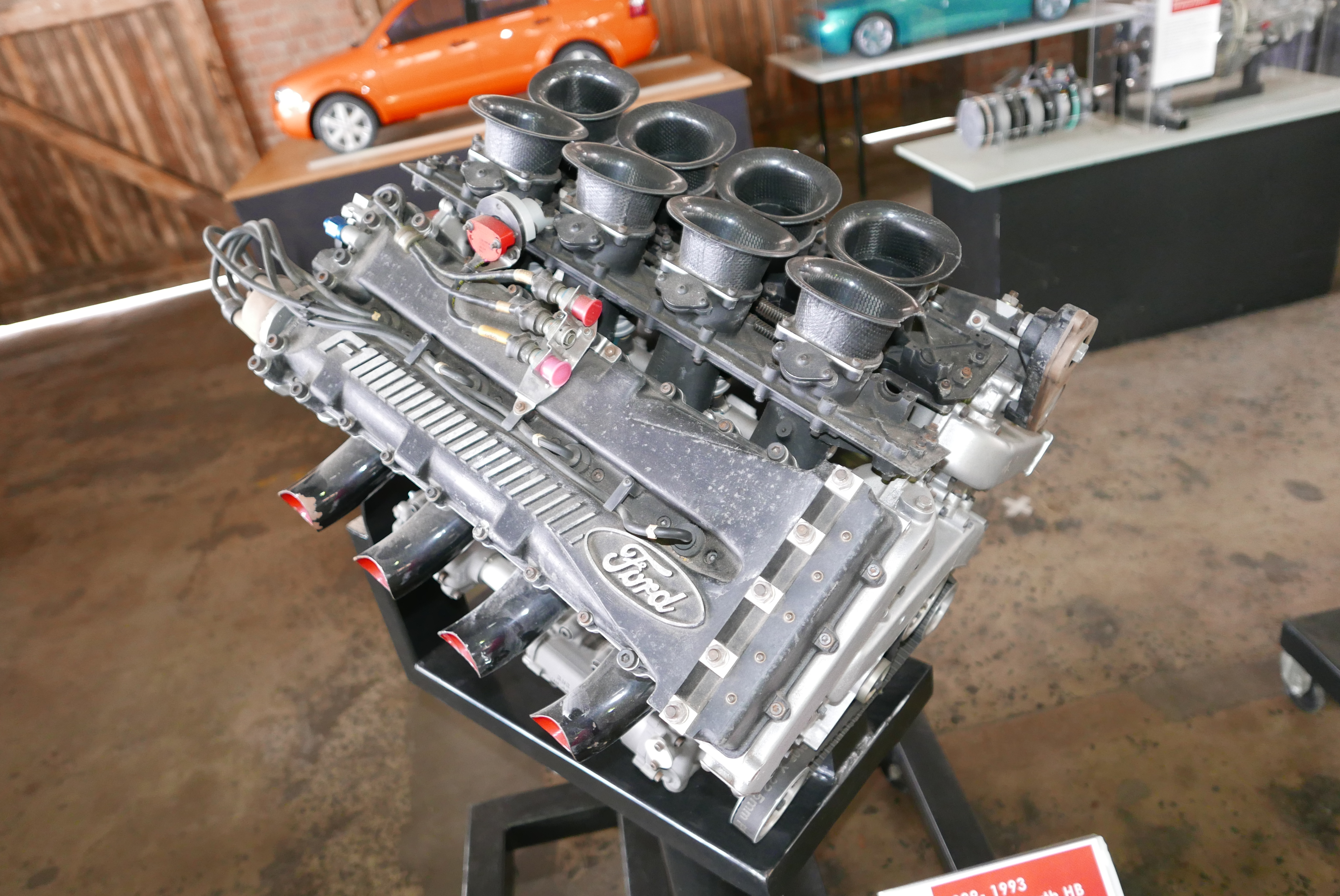
Ford-Cosworth's HBA V8 engine

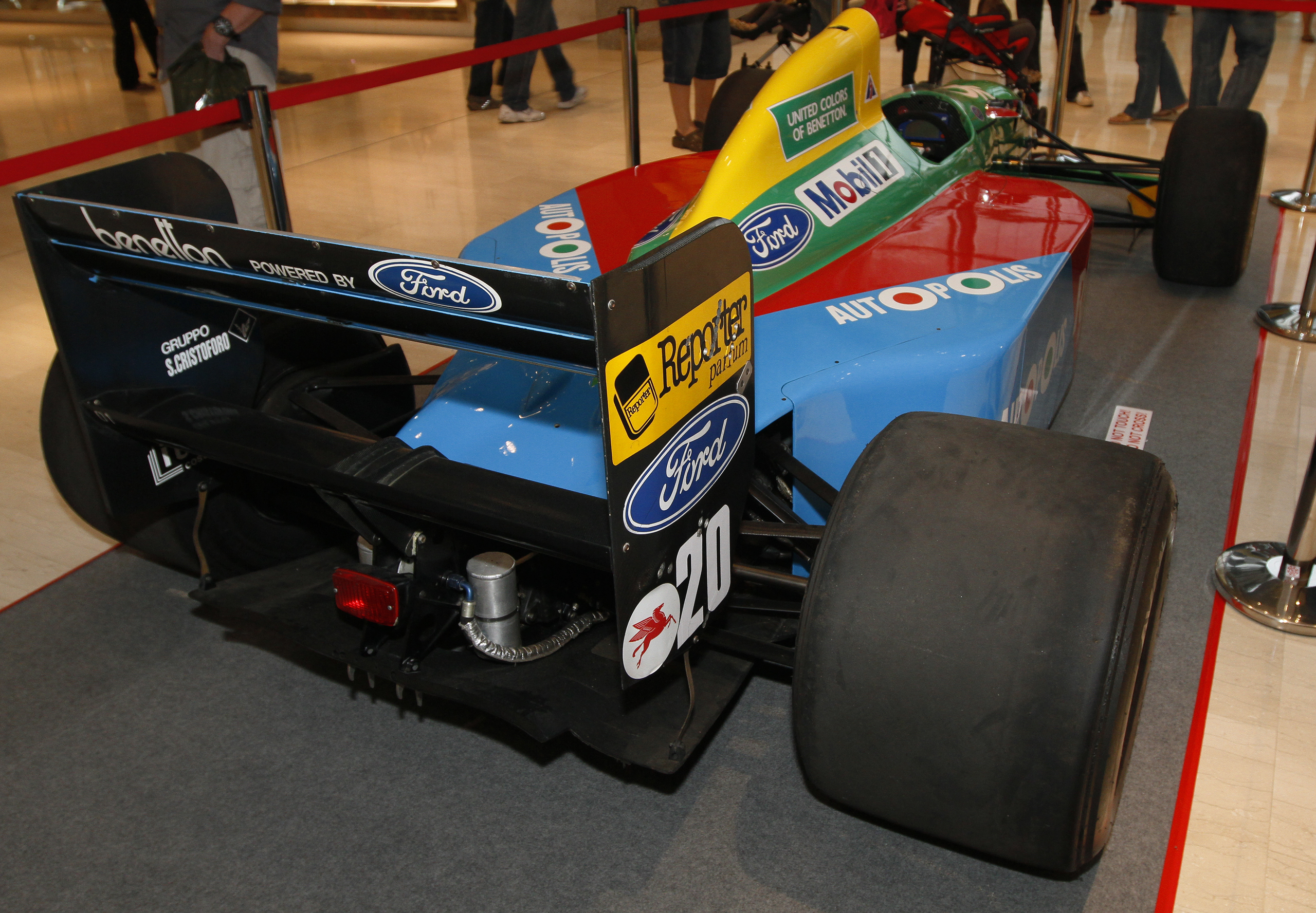
Rear view of the Benetton B190

== Complete Formula One results ==
(key)

Year	Entrant	Chassis	Engine	Tyres	Driver	1	2	3	4	5	6	7	8	9	10	11	12	13	14	15	16	Pts.	WCC
1990	Benetton Formula Ltd	B190	Ford HBA4; V8	G		USA	BRA	SMR	MON	CAN	MEX	FRA	GBR	GER	HUN	BEL	ITA	POR	ESP	JPN	AUS	71*	3rd
1990	Benetton Formula Ltd	B190	Ford HBA4; V8	G	Alessandro Nannini			3	Ret	Ret	4	16	Ret	2	Ret	4	8	6	3			71*	3rd
1990	Benetton Formula Ltd	B190	Ford HBA4; V8	G	Roberto Moreno															2	7	71*	3rd
1990	Benetton Formula Ltd	B190	Ford HBA4; V8	G	Nelson Piquet			5	DSQ	2	6	4	5	Ret	3	5	7	5	Ret	1	1	71*	3rd
1991	Camel Benetton Ford	B190B	Ford HBA4; V8	P		USA	BRA	SMR	MON	CAN	MEX	FRA	GBR	GER	HUN	BEL	ITA	POR	ESP	JPN	AUS	38.5*	4th
1991	Camel Benetton Ford	B190B	Ford HBA4; V8	P	Roberto Moreno	Ret	7															38.5*	4th
1991	Camel Benetton Ford	B190B	Ford HBA4; V8	P	Nelson Piquet	3	5															38.5*	4th

* 4 points scored in 1990 using Benetton B189B
* 32.5 points scored in 1991 using Benetton B191
