= 1989 British Grand Prix =

- Race 8 of 16 in the 1989 Formula One World Championship
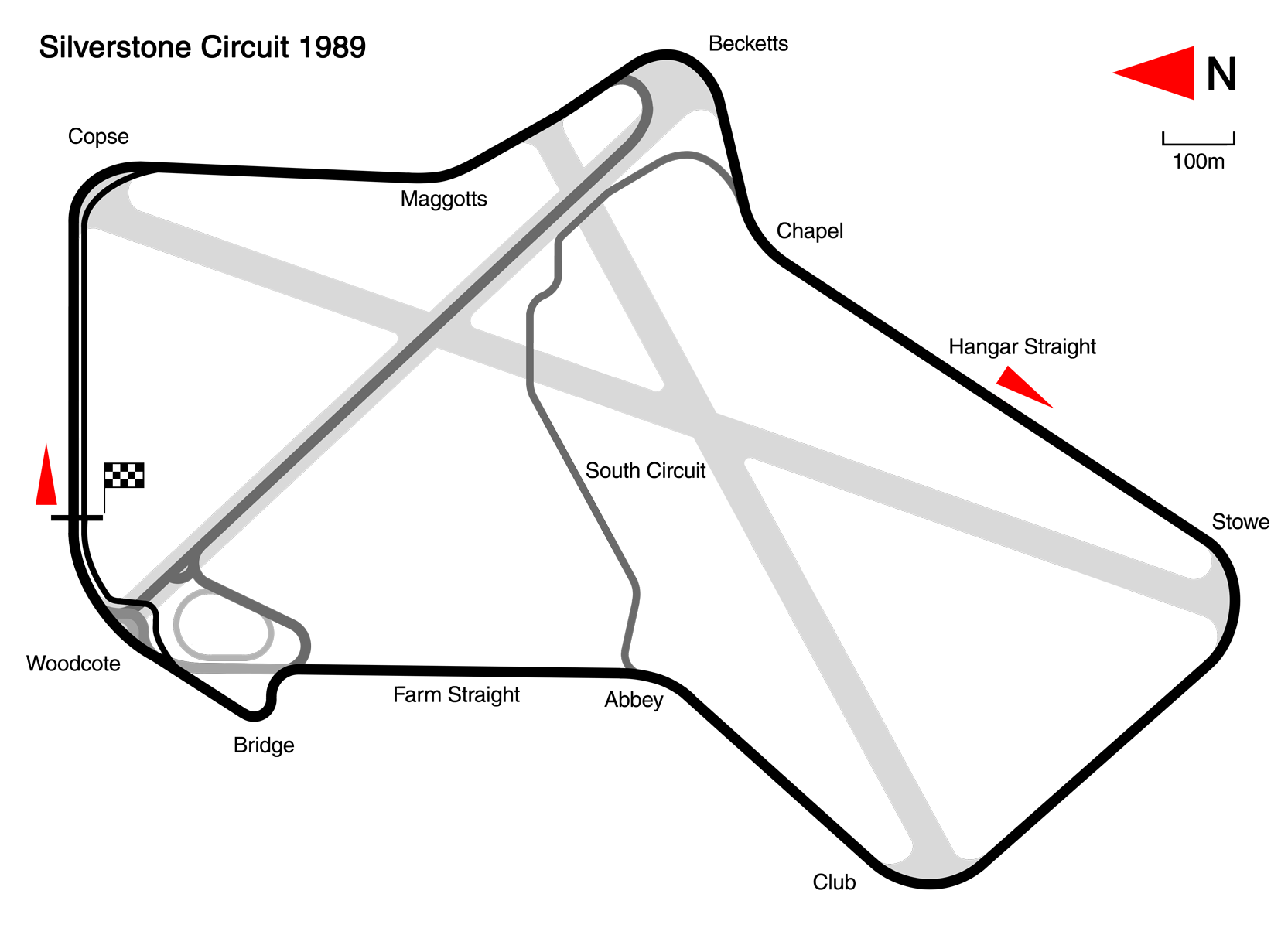

Race details
- Date: 16 July 1989
- Official name: XLII Shell British Grand Prix
- Location: Silverstone Circuit; Silverstone, Northamptonshire, England
- Course: Permanent racing facility
- Course length: 4.778 km (2.969 miles)
- Distance: 64 laps, 305.904 km (190.080 miles)
- Weather: Warm, dry, sunny

Pole position
Driver	(Brazil) Ayrton Senna	McLaren-Honda
- Time: 1:09.099

Fastest lap
Driver	(United Kingdom) Nigel Mansell	Ferrari
- Time: 1:12.017 on lap 57

Podium
First	(France) Alain Prost	McLaren-Honda
Second	(United Kingdom) Nigel Mansell	Ferrari
Third	(Italy) Alessandro Nannini	Benetton-Ford

The 1989 British Grand Prix (formally the XLII Shell British Grand Prix) was a Formula One motor race held at Silverstone on 16 July 1989. It was the eighth race of the 1989 Formula One World Championship.

The 64-lap race was won by Frenchman Alain Prost, driving a McLaren-Honda, after he started from second position. Prost's Brazilian teammate, Ayrton Senna, took pole position and led until he spun off on lap 12. Local driver Nigel Mansell finished second in a Ferrari, with Italian Alessandro Nannini third in a Benetton-Ford. This marked the last win for a Honda-powered car at Silverstone until Max Verstappen won the 70th Anniversary Grand Prix in 2020, and is also the last time a McLaren driver had won at the venue, until David Coulthard won the 1999 British Grand Prix there.

== Qualifying ==
=== Pre-qualifying report ===
For the second Grand Prix in a row, the Onyx of Bertrand Gachot topped the time sheets in Friday morning's pre-qualifying session. It was Gachot's second pre-qualifying success. Two tenths of a second slower in second place was Nicola Larini in the Osella, pre-qualifying for the third time this season. The other two to go through to the main qualifying sessions were the Brabham pairing of Stefano Modena and Martin Brundle. This was the team's last pre-qualifying session of the season, as their five points in Monaco were enough to enable them to avoid having to pre-qualify for the rest of the season. Modena had pre-qualified at all eight events so far in 1989, and Brundle six, with both drivers qualifying for all of those races.

Brundle, who had failed to pre-qualify in both Canada and France, told in a pit lane interview during qualifying proper that he was glad to make it through as he had been "Driving like an old tart quite frankly".

Stefan Johansson narrowly missed out in fifth place in the second Onyx, his fourth failure this season. Alex Caffi was sixth in the Dallara, only his second failure, but Dallara were another team who would avoid pre-qualifying for the rest of the season, having scored eight points.

Gregor Foitek was seventh in the sole EuroBrun, still only able to pre-qualify once this season, which was once more than Piercarlo Ghinzani, eighth in the second Osella. Ninth was Yannick Dalmas, who had replaced Joachim Winkelhock at AGS, and for the rest of the season, both AGS cars would have to take part in pre-qualifying sessions. The Zakspeed pairing of Bernd Schneider and Aguri Suzuki were tenth and twelfth, with no success at this stage since the first race of the season. Pierre-Henri Raphanel was eleventh in his Coloni, and from here on, both Colonis would have to take part in pre-qualifying. At the bottom of the time sheets was the Rial of Volker Weidler, his eighth consecutive failure to pre-qualify, but Christian Danner's three points at Phoenix meant both cars would avoid pre-qualifying for the rest of the season.

=== Pre-qualifying classification ===
Pos	No	Driver	Constructor	Time	Gap
1	37	(Belgium) Bertrand Gachot	Onyx-Ford	1:11.506	—
2	17	(Italy) Nicola Larini	Osella-Ford	1:11.766	+0.260
3	8	(Italy) Stefano Modena	Brabham-Judd	1:11.809	+0.303
4	7	(United Kingdom) Martin Brundle	Brabham-Judd	1:12.021	+0.515
5	36	(Sweden) Stefan Johansson	Onyx-Ford	1:12.248	+0.742
6	21	(Italy) Alex Caffi	Dallara-Ford	1.12.501	+0.995
7	33	(Switzerland) Gregor Foitek	EuroBrun-Judd	1:13.128	+1.622
8	18	(Italy) Piercarlo Ghinzani	Osella-Ford	1:13.429	+1.923
9	41	(France) Yannick Dalmas	AGS-Ford	1:13.720	+2.214
10	34	(Germany) Bernd Schneider	Zakspeed-Yamaha	1:14.124	+2.618
11	32	(France) Pierre-Henri Raphanel	Coloni-Ford	1:14.206	+2.700
12	35	(Japan) Aguri Suzuki	Zakspeed-Yamaha	1:14.266	+2.760
13	39	(Germany) Volker Weidler	Rial-Ford	1:15.096	+3.590

=== Qualifying report ===
McLaren took control of qualifying with Ayrton Senna ahead of Alain Prost. Having announced before the previous race in France that he would be leaving McLaren at the end of the season, Prost now announced that he would be joining Ferrari in 1990.

Derek Warwick returned after missing the French Grand Prix, qualifying 19th. Still in pain from his karting accident, he had a special seat fitted in his Arrows. Maurício Gugelmin qualified sixth, but his March developed a water-related problem moments before the race, forcing him to start from the pit lane.

=== Qualifying classification ===
Pos	No	Driver	Constructor	Q1	Q2	Gap
1	1	(Brazil) Ayrton Senna	McLaren-Honda	1:09.124	1:09.099	—
2	2	(France) Alain Prost	McLaren-Honda	1:10.156	1:09.266	+0.167
3	27	(United Kingdom) Nigel Mansell	Ferrari	1:09.488	1:10.279	+0.389
4	28	(Austria) Gerhard Berger	Ferrari	1:09.855	1:10.130	+0.756
5	6	(Italy) Riccardo Patrese	Williams-Renault	1:09.865	1:09.963	+0.766
6	15	(Brazil) Maurício Gugelmin	March-Judd	1:10.336	1:12.665	+1.237
7	5	(Belgium) Thierry Boutsen	Williams-Renault	1:10.376	1:10.771	+1.277
8	16	(Italy) Ivan Capelli	March-Judd	1:10.650	1:11.544	+1.551
9	19	(Italy) Alessandro Nannini	Benetton-Ford	1:11.034	1:10.798	+1.699
10	11	(Brazil) Nelson Piquet	Lotus-Judd	1:11.589	1:10.925	+1.826
11	23	(Italy) Pierluigi Martini	Minardi-Ford	1:11.368	1:11.582	+2.269
12	30	(France) Philippe Alliot	Lola-Lamborghini	1:11.541	1:12.408	+2.442
13	29	(France) Éric Bernard	Lola-Lamborghini	1:12.193	1:11.687	+2.588
14	8	(Italy) Stefano Modena	Brabham-Judd	1:12.262	1:11.755	+2.656
15	24	(Spain) Luis Pérez-Sala	Minardi-Ford	1:11.955	1:11.826	+2.727
16	12	(Japan) Satoru Nakajima	Lotus-Judd	1:12.326	1:11.960	+2.861
17	17	(Italy) Nicola Larini	Osella-Ford	1:12.061	1:12.395	+2.962
18	3	(United Kingdom) Jonathan Palmer	Tyrrell-Ford	1:12.070	1:12.157	+2.971
19	9	(United Kingdom) Derek Warwick	Arrows-Ford	1:12.295	1:12.208	+3.109
20	7	(United Kingdom) Martin Brundle	Brabham-Judd	1:12.616	1:12.327	+3.228
21	37	(Belgium) Bertrand Gachot	Onyx-Ford	1:12.329	1:12.928	+3.230
22	4	(France) Jean Alesi	Tyrrell-Ford	1:12.994	1:12.341	+3.242
23	31	(Brazil) Roberto Moreno	Coloni-Ford	1:12.680	1:12.412	+3.313
24	26	(France) Olivier Grouillard	Ligier-Ford	1:12.853	1:12.605	+3.506
25	22	(Italy) Andrea de Cesaris	Dallara-Ford	1:13.335	1:12.904	+3.805
26	20	(Italy) Emanuele Pirro	Benetton-Ford	1:13.233	1:13.148	+4.049
27	25	(France) René Arnoux	Ligier-Ford	1:13.240	1:13.550	+4.141
28	10	(United States) Eddie Cheever	Arrows-Ford	1:13.655	1:13.386	+4.287
29	40	(Italy) Gabriele Tarquini	AGS-Ford	1:13.496	1:13.997	+4.397
30	38	(Germany) Christian Danner	Rial-Ford	1:15.387	1:15.394	+6.288

== Race ==
=== Race report ===
Prost beat Senna off the line, but the Brazilian was later on the brakes. He re-took the lead going into Copse Corner by chopping across his team mate's nose, with both Prost and the following Nigel Mansell confirming it was "close". The Ferraris of Mansell and Gerhard Berger were 3rd and 4th. At the end of lap 4, Berger pulled into the pits with electrical problems, rejoining the race some laps later. On lap 5 the race order was Senna, Prost, Mansell, the Williams-Renault pair of Thierry Boutsen and Riccardo Patrese, and Alessandro Nannini in the new Benetton B189 and its equally new, and more powerful, Ford HB V8.

Senna spun out on lap 12 going into Becketts due to gear selection problems (Becketts was a 3rd gear corner at the time and coming down through the gears Senna could not get 3rd to engage) and spun, handing Prost the lead from Mansell. Patrese overtook teammate Boutsen for third, before suffering a huge accident on lap 20 when a burst radiator sprayed water onto his rear wheels, causing him to spin off into the tyre barrier at Club Corner. With Prost and Mansell pulling away, Nelson Piquet moved into third in his Lotus-Judd on lap 23, ahead of Boutsen, Philippe Alliot in the Larrousse-Lola and Jean Alesi in the Tyrrell. Boutsen dropped back with a rear puncture while Alesi spun off at Club Corner on lap 29, at which point Prost led Mansell by 3.2 seconds, followed by Piquet, Nannini, Gugelmin and Alliot.

Alliot retired with an engine failure on lap 40. On lap 42, Mansell developed a puncture on his right front tyre, forcing him to pit. Prost was then delayed during his own pit stop for fresh tyres, but retained a healthy lead over Mansell. Gugelmin retired from fifth with a gearbox failure on lap 55, before Nannini passed Piquet for third on lap 56, pulling away in the closing laps.

At the chequered flag, Prost was 19 seconds ahead of Mansell, with Nannini a further 29 seconds back and Piquet the last driver on the lead lap. From early on the overheating light had been on in the Lotus cockpit, so Piquet pushed as hard as he could in a make or break attitude and was rewarded with easily his best drive of the year. The Minardis of Pierluigi Martini and Luis Pérez-Sala finished fifth and sixth, scoring three points which prevented the team from being relegated to the pre-qualifying sessions for the second half of 1989 (and kept the Onyx team in these sessions, despite their two points for Stefan Johansson's fifth place at the previous race in France). This was Sala's only point in Formula One.

=== Race classification ===
Pos	No	Driver	Constructor	Laps	Time/Retired	Grid	Points
1	2	(France) Alain Prost	McLaren-Honda	64	1:19:22.131	2	9
2	27	(United Kingdom) Nigel Mansell	Ferrari	64	+ 19.369	3	6
3	19	(Italy) Alessandro Nannini	Benetton-Ford	64	+ 48.019	9	4
4	11	(Brazil) Nelson Piquet	Lotus-Judd	64	+ 1:06.735	10	3
5	23	(Italy) Pierluigi Martini	Minardi-Ford	63	+ 1 lap	11	2
6	24	(Spain) Luis Pérez-Sala	Minardi-Ford	63	+ 1 lap	15	1
7	26	(France) Olivier Grouillard	Ligier-Ford	63	+ 1 lap	24	
8	12	(Japan) Satoru Nakajima	Lotus-Judd	63	+ 1 lap	16	
9	9	(United Kingdom) Derek Warwick	Arrows-Ford	62	+ 2 laps	19	
10	5	(Belgium) Thierry Boutsen	Williams-Renault	62	+ 2 laps	7	
11	20	(Italy) Emanuele Pirro	Benetton-Ford	62	+ 2 laps	26	
12	37	(Belgium) Bertrand Gachot	Onyx-Ford	62	+ 2 laps	21	
Ret	15	(Brazil) Maurício Gugelmin	March-Judd	54	Gearbox	6	
Ret	7	(United Kingdom) Martin Brundle	Brabham-Judd	49	Engine	20	
Ret	28	(Austria) Gerhard Berger	Ferrari	49	Gear fire	4	
Ret	29	(France) Éric Bernard	Lola-Lamborghini	46	Engine	13	
Ret	30	(France) Philippe Alliot	Lola-Lamborghini	39	Engine	12	
Ret	3	(United Kingdom) Jonathan Palmer	Tyrrell-Ford	32	Accident	18	
Ret	8	(Italy) Stefano Modena	Brabham-Judd	31	Engine	14	
Ret	4	(France) Jean Alesi	Tyrrell-Ford	28	Spun off	22	
Ret	17	(Italy) Nicola Larini	Osella-Ford	23	Handling	17	
Ret	6	(Italy) Riccardo Patrese	Williams-Renault	19	Radiator/accident	5	
Ret	16	(Italy) Ivan Capelli	March-Judd	15	Transmission	8	
Ret	22	(Italy) Andrea de Cesaris	Dallara-Ford	14	Engine	25	
Ret	1	(Brazil) Ayrton Senna	McLaren-Honda	11	Spun off/gearbox	1	
Ret	31	(Brazil) Roberto Moreno	Coloni-Ford	2	Gearbox	23	
DNQ	25	(France) René Arnoux	Ligier-Ford				
DNQ	10	(United States) Eddie Cheever	Arrows-Ford				
DNQ	40	(Italy) Gabriele Tarquini	AGS-Ford				
DNQ	38	(Germany) Christian Danner	Rial-Ford				
DNPQ	36	(Sweden) Stefan Johansson	Onyx-Ford				
DNPQ	21	(Italy) Alex Caffi	Dallara-Ford				
DNPQ	33	(Switzerland) Gregor Foitek	EuroBrun-Judd				
DNPQ	18	(Italy) Piercarlo Ghinzani	Osella-Ford				
DNPQ	41	(France) Yannick Dalmas	AGS-Ford				
DNPQ	34	(Germany) Bernd Schneider	Zakspeed-Yamaha				
DNPQ	32	(France) Pierre-Henri Raphanel	Coloni-Ford				
DNPQ	35	(Japan) Aguri Suzuki	Zakspeed-Yamaha				
DNPQ	39	(Germany) Volker Weidler	Rial-Ford				

== Championship standings after the race ==
Drivers' Championship standings

Pos	Driver	Points
1	(France) Alain Prost	47
2	(Brazil) Ayrton Senna	27
3	(Italy) Riccardo Patrese	22
4	(United Kingdom) Nigel Mansell	21
5	(Belgium) Thierry Boutsen	13

Constructors' Championship standings

Pos	Constructor	Points
1	(United Kingdom) McLaren-Honda	74
2	(United Kingdom) Williams-Renault	35
3	(Italy) Ferrari	21
4	(United Kingdom) Benetton-Ford	17
5	(United Kingdom) Tyrrell-Ford	10

- Note: Only the top five positions are included for both sets of standings.

Previous race: 1989 French Grand Prix	FIA Formula One World Championship; 1989 season	Next race: 1989 German Grand Prix
Previous race: 1988 British Grand Prix	British Grand Prix	Next race: 1990 British Grand Prix
