= 1989 French Grand Prix =

Formula One motor race held in 1989

- Race 7 of 16 in the 1989 Formula One World Championship
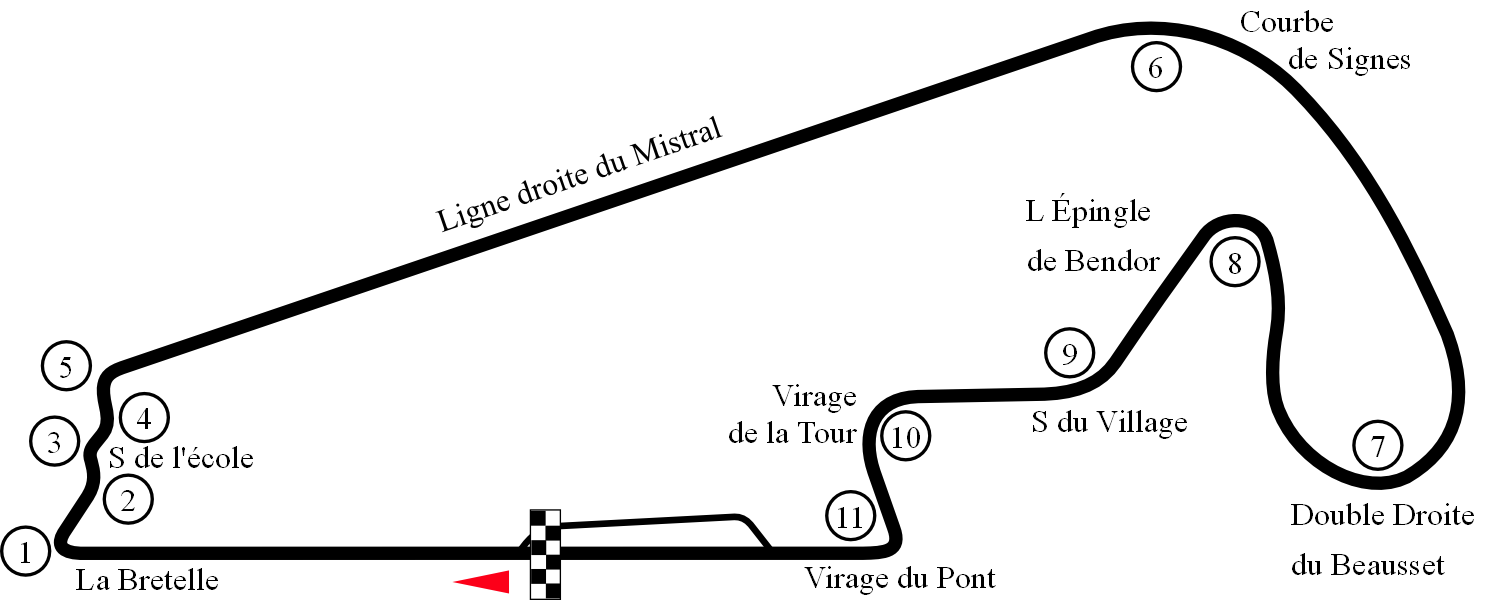

Race details
- Date: 9 July 1989
- Official name: LXXV Rhône-Poulenc Grand Prix de France
- Location: Circuit Paul Ricard; Le Castellet, Var, France
- Course: Permanent racing facility
- Course length: 3.813 km (2.369 mi)
- Distance: 80 laps, 305.040 km (189.543 mi)
- Weather: Hot, dry, sunny

Pole position
Driver	(France) Alain Prost	McLaren-Honda
- Time: 1:07.203

Fastest lap
Driver	(Brazil) Maurício Gugelmin	March-Judd
- Time: 1:12.090 on lap 29

Podium
First	(France) Alain Prost	McLaren-Honda
Second	(United Kingdom) Nigel Mansell	Ferrari
Third	(Italy) Riccardo Patrese	Williams-Renault

The 1989 French Grand Prix was a Formula One motor race held at Paul Ricard on 9 July 1989. It was the seventh race of the 1989 Formula One World Championship.

The 80-lap race was won from pole position by local driver Alain Prost, driving a McLaren-Honda, with Englishman Nigel Mansell second in a Ferrari and Italian Riccardo Patrese third in a Williams-Renault.

== Background ==
The event, officially called the Rhône-Poulenc Grand Prix de France, was held at the 3.813-kilometre (2.369 mi) Circuit Paul Ricard in Le Castellet, Var, near the French city of Marseille. Free and qualifying practice sessions were held on Friday 7 July and Saturday 8 July, while a morning warmup session and the main Grand Prix race were held on Sunday 9 July 1989.

In a press conference before the race, Alain Prost announced that he would be leaving McLaren at the end of the season, with the speculation being that he would join Scuderia Ferrari in 1990.

Four drivers would make their F1 debuts at this race. Frenchman Jean Alesi, then contesting the Formula 3000 Championship, replaced Michele Alboreto at Tyrrell when the team took on Camel as its major sponsor, clashing with Alboreto's Marlboro sponsorship. Another Frenchman, Éric Bernard, replaced Yannick Dalmas at Larrousse, Dalmas still suffering the effects of Legionnaires' disease. Lotus test driver Martin Donnelly took the place of Derek Warwick at Arrows for this race after Warwick injured his back in a karting accident.

Finally, McLaren test driver Emanuele Pirro replaced Johnny Herbert at Benetton after it was decided that Herbert needed more time to recover from the leg and ankle injuries he had sustained in the Formula 3000 race at Brands Hatch in 1988. Benetton debuted their B189 car, with the new Ford HB engine, at Paul Ricard, Alessandro Nannini driving this car while Pirro drove the older, DFR-powered B188.

== Qualifying ==
=== Pre-qualifying report ===
For the first time, both Onyx cars made it into the main qualifying sessions, as Bertrand Gachot and Stefan Johansson came first and second in pre-qualifying. It was Gachot's first pre-qualifying success in seven attempts. Alex Caffi in the Dallara was a few hundredths of a second back in third, and Stefano Modena in the Brabham was the fourth and last prequalifier, marginally faster than the Osella of Nicola Larini.

The other entrants who failed to pre-qualify on the Friday morning were Modena's Brabham team-mate Martin Brundle in sixth, the second time in a row the British driver had failed at this stage. Volker Weidler was seventh in the Rial, his seventh successive failure to pre-qualify. Both Zakspeeds again missed out, Bernd Schneider eighth, and Aguri Suzuki eleventh. Ninth was Piercarlo Ghinzani in the second Osella, the Italian's seventh consecutive pre-qualifying failure, and Pierre-Henri Raphanel was tenth in his Coloni. Gregor Foitek's EuroBrun and Joachim Winkelhock's AGS were bottom of the timesheets. Winkelhock left AGS after this weekend having failed to pre-qualify at any Grand Prix thus far, to be replaced by the recently sacked Larrousse-Lola driver Yannick Dalmas.

=== Pre-qualifying classification ===
Pos	No	Driver	Constructor	Time	Gap
1	37	(Belgium) Bertrand Gachot	Onyx-Ford	1:09.617	
2	36	(Sweden) Stefan Johansson	Onyx-Ford	1:09.668	+0.051
3	21	(Italy) Alex Caffi	Dallara-Ford	1:09.726	+0.109
4	8	(Italy) Stefano Modena	Brabham-Judd	1:09.917	+0.300
5	17	(Italy) Nicola Larini	Osella-Ford	1:09.989	+0.372
6	7	(United Kingdom) Martin Brundle	Brabham-Judd	1.10.181	+0.564
7	39	(Germany) Volker Weidler	Rial-Ford	1:11.059	+1.442
8	34	(Germany) Bernd Schneider	Zakspeed-Yamaha	1:11.098	+1.481
9	18	(Italy) Piercarlo Ghinzani	Osella-Ford	1:11.528	+1.911
10	32	(France) Pierre-Henri Raphanel	Coloni-Ford	1:11.953	+2.336
11	35	(Japan) Aguri Suzuki	Zakspeed-Yamaha	1:12.031	+2.414
12	33	(Switzerland) Gregor Foitek	EuroBrun-Judd	1:12.179	+2.562
13	41	(Germany) Joachim Winkelhock	AGS-Ford	1:13.173	+3.556

=== Qualifying report ===
For the second successive race, Alain Prost narrowly beat McLaren teammate Ayrton Senna to pole position, this time by 0.025 seconds. On the second row were Nigel Mansell in the Ferrari and Nannini in the new Benetton, and on the third row were Thierry Boutsen in the Williams and Gerhard Berger in the second Ferrari. The Larrousse team had also sacked Philippe Alliot prior to the race only to then re-hire him; he responded by qualifying seventh, with the second Williams of Riccardo Patrese alongside him on the fourth row. The top ten was completed by Jonathan Palmer in the Tyrrell and Maurício Gugelmin in the March.

The Onyxes continued their good form from pre-qualifying, with Gachot taking 11th on the grid and Johansson 13th. Debutants Donnelly, Bernard and Alesi were 14th, 15th and 16th respectively, with Pirro 24th in the older Benetton. The other two pre-qualifiers, Modena and Caffi, were 22nd and 26th respectively, Caffi edging out teammate Andrea de Cesaris for the last grid spot.

During the season, the Pirelli qualifying tyres were regularly seen to be faster than their Goodyear counterparts, often allowing the usual lower grid teams to qualify higher up the grid than they might otherwise have been. In France however on the abrasive Paul Ricard surface, this was virtually reversed with Pirelli runners reporting little grip from their usually "demon" qualifiers while the Goodyear runners reported no such issues.

=== Qualifying classification ===
Pos	No	Driver	Constructor	Q1	Q2	Gap
1	2	(France) Alain Prost	McLaren-Honda	1:08.285	1:07.203	
2	1	(Brazil) Ayrton Senna	McLaren-Honda	1:07.920	1:07.228	+0.025
3	27	(United Kingdom) Nigel Mansell	Ferrari	1:09.030	1:07.455	+0.252
4	19	(Italy) Alessandro Nannini	Benetton-Ford	1:09.615	1:08.137	+0.934
5	5	(Belgium) Thierry Boutsen	Williams-Renault	1:08.299	1:08.211	+1.008
6	28	(Austria) Gerhard Berger	Ferrari	1:09.011	1:08.233	+1.030
7	30	(France) Philippe Alliot	Lola-Lamborghini	1:09.478	1:08.561	+1.358
8	6	(Italy) Riccardo Patrese	Williams-Renault	1:09.326	1:08.993	+1.790
9	3	(United Kingdom) Jonathan Palmer	Tyrrell-Ford	1:10.238	1:09.026	+1.823
10	15	(Brazil) Maurício Gugelmin	March-Judd	1:10.122	1:09.036	+1.833
11	37	(Belgium) Bertrand Gachot	Onyx-Ford	1:10.564	1:09.122	+1.919
12	16	(Italy) Ivan Capelli	March-Judd	1:09.569	1:09.283	+2.080
13	36	(Sweden) Stefan Johansson	Onyx-Ford	1:10.600	1:09.299	+2.096
14	9	(United Kingdom) Martin Donnelly	Arrows-Ford	1:11.223	1:09.524	+2.321
15	29	(France) Éric Bernard	Lola-Lamborghini	1:25.401	1:09.596	+2.393
16	4	(France) Jean Alesi	Tyrrell-Ford	1:09.668	1:09.909	+2.465
17	26	(France) Olivier Grouillard	Ligier-Ford	1:10.410	1:09.717	+2.514
18	25	(France) René Arnoux	Ligier-Ford	1:10.725	1:10.077	+2.874
19	12	(Japan) Satoru Nakajima	Lotus-Judd	1:12.125	1:10.119	+2.916
20	11	(Brazil) Nelson Piquet	Lotus-Judd	1:10.473	1:10.135	+2.932
21	40	(Italy) Gabriele Tarquini	AGS-Ford	1:11.136	1:10.216	+3.013
22	8	(Italy) Stefano Modena	Brabham-Judd	1:10.910	1:10.254	+3.051
23	23	(Italy) Pierluigi Martini	Minardi-Ford	1:10.640	1:10.267	+3.064
24	20	(Italy) Emanuele Pirro	Benetton-Ford	1:11.566	1:10.292	+3.089
25	10	(United States) Eddie Cheever	Arrows-Ford	1:10.372	—	+3.169
26	21	(Italy) Alex Caffi	Dallara-Ford	1:11.409	1:10.468	+3.265
27	22	(Italy) Andrea de Cesaris	Dallara-Ford	1:12.078	1:10.591	+3.388
28	24	(Spain) Luis Pérez-Sala	Minardi-Ford	1:11.539	1:11.079	+3.876
29	38	(Germany) Christian Danner	Rial-Ford	1:12.569	1:11.178	+3.975
30	31	(Brazil) Roberto Moreno	Coloni-Ford	1:14.746	1:11.372	+4.169

== Race ==
=== Race report ===
At the first start, Senna led into the first corner from Prost, while behind them, Gugelmin locked his brakes and veered into Boutsen's Williams and Berger's Ferrari. The March launched into the air and flipped upside down, also knocking off Mansell's rear wing. The race was immediately red-flagged, a shaken Gugelmin taking the restart from the pit lane along with Mansell and Donnelly.

At the restart, Senna suffered a differential failure, leaving Prost to lead every lap of the race. Berger ran second in the early stages, ahead of Nannini, Boutsen and Ivan Capelli in the second March, before spinning on lap 12 and eventually retiring with a clutch failure. Boutsen developed gearbox problems while Nannini suffered a suspension failure on lap 41, promoting Capelli to second for three laps before his engine failed. This left Alesi second on his debut, ahead of Patrese and Mansell, before he pitted for tyres. Alliot and Gachot also ran in the top six before Alliot suffered an engine failure and Gachot pitted with a flat battery. On lap 61, Patrese spun under pressure from Mansell, allowing the Englishman through into second.

Prost took the chequered flag 44 seconds ahead of Mansell, with Patrese a further 22 seconds back. Alesi was fourth, seven seconds behind Patrese and the last driver on the lead lap, with Johansson scoring Onyx's first points in fifth and Olivier Grouillard in the Ligier scoring his only point for sixth. Pirro was ninth, Bernard 11th and Donnelly 12th, while Gugelmin recovered from his accident by setting the fastest race lap.

With the win, Prost extended his lead over Senna in the Drivers' Championship to 11 points.

=== Race classification ===
Pos	No	Driver	Constructor	Laps	Time/Retired	Grid	Points
1	2	(France) Alain Prost	McLaren-Honda	80	1:38:29.411	1	9
2	27	(United Kingdom) Nigel Mansell	Ferrari	80	+ 44.017	3	6
3	6	(Italy) Riccardo Patrese	Williams-Renault	80	+ 1:06.921	8	4
4	4	(France) Jean Alesi	Tyrrell-Ford	80	+ 1:13.232	16	3
5	36	(Sweden) Stefan Johansson	Onyx-Ford	79	+ 1 Lap	13	2
6	26	(France) Olivier Grouillard	Ligier-Ford	79	+ 1 Lap	17	1
7	10	(United States) Eddie Cheever	Arrows-Ford	79	+ 1 Lap	25	
8	11	(Brazil) Nelson Piquet	Lotus-Judd	78	+ 2 Laps	20	
9	20	(Italy) Emanuele Pirro	Benetton-Ford	78	+ 2 Laps	24	
10	3	(United Kingdom) Jonathan Palmer	Tyrrell-Ford	78	+ 2 Laps	9	
11	29	(France) Éric Bernard	Lola-Lamborghini	77	+ 3 Laps	15	
12	9	(United Kingdom) Martin Donnelly	Arrows-Ford	77	+ 3 Laps	14	
13	37	(Belgium) Bertrand Gachot	Onyx-Ford	76	Engine	11	
NC	15	(Brazil) Maurício Gugelmin	March-Judd	71	+ 9 Laps	10	
Ret	8	(Italy) Stefano Modena	Brabham-Judd	67	Engine	22	
Ret	5	(Belgium) Thierry Boutsen	Williams-Renault	50	Gearbox	5	
Ret	12	(Japan) Satoru Nakajima	Lotus-Judd	49	Engine	19	
Ret	16	(Italy) Ivan Capelli	March-Judd	43	Engine	12	
Ret	19	(Italy) Alessandro Nannini	Benetton-Ford	40	Suspension	4	
Ret	23	(Italy) Pierluigi Martini	Minardi-Ford	31	Engine	23	
Ret	30	(France) Philippe Alliot	Lola-Lamborghini	30	Engine	7	
Ret	40	(Italy) Gabriele Tarquini	AGS-Ford	30	Engine	21	
Ret	28	(Austria) Gerhard Berger	Ferrari	29	Clutch	6	
Ret	21	(Italy) Alex Caffi	Dallara-Ford	27	Clutch	26	
Ret	25	(France) René Arnoux	Ligier-Ford	14	Gearbox	18	
Ret	1	(Brazil) Ayrton Senna	McLaren-Honda	0	Differential	2	
DNQ	22	(Italy) Andrea de Cesaris	Dallara-Ford				
DNQ	24	(Spain) Luis Pérez-Sala	Minardi-Ford				
DNQ	38	(Germany) Christian Danner	Rial-Ford				
DNQ	31	(Brazil) Roberto Moreno	Coloni-Ford				
DNPQ	17	(Italy) Nicola Larini	Osella-Ford				
DNPQ	7	(United Kingdom) Martin Brundle	Brabham-Judd				
DNPQ	39	(Germany) Volker Weidler	Rial-Ford				
DNPQ	34	(Germany) Bernd Schneider	Zakspeed-Yamaha				
DNPQ	18	(Italy) Piercarlo Ghinzani	Osella-Ford				
DNPQ	32	(France) Pierre-Henri Raphanel	Coloni-Ford				
DNPQ	35	(Japan) Aguri Suzuki	Zakspeed-Yamaha				
DNPQ	33	(Switzerland) Gregor Foitek	EuroBrun-Judd				
DNPQ	41	(Germany) Joachim Winkelhock	AGS-Ford				

== Championship standings after the race ==
Drivers' Championship standings

Pos	Driver	Points
1	(France) Alain Prost	38
2	(Brazil) Ayrton Senna	27
3	(Italy) Riccardo Patrese	22
4	(United Kingdom) Nigel Mansell	15
5	(Belgium) Thierry Boutsen	13

Constructors' Championship standings

Pos	Constructor	Points
1	(United Kingdom) McLaren-Honda	65
2	(United Kingdom) Williams-Renault	35
3	(Italy) Ferrari	15
4	(United Kingdom) Benetton-Ford	13
5	(United Kingdom) Tyrrell-Ford	10

- Note: Only the top five positions are included for both sets of standings.

Previous race: 1989 Canadian Grand Prix	FIA Formula One World Championship; 1989 season	Next race: 1989 British Grand Prix
Previous race: 1988 French Grand Prix	French Grand Prix	Next race: 1990 French Grand Prix
