= 1989 Japanese Grand Prix =

- Race 15 of 16 in the 1989 Formula One World Championship

Race details
- Date: 22 October 1989
- Official name: XV Fuji Television Japanese Grand Prix
- Location: Suzuka Circuit, Suzuka, Japan
- Course: Permanent racing facility
- Course length: 5.860 km (3.641 miles)
- Distance: 53 laps, 310.580 km (192.985 miles)
- Weather: Dry, warm, cloudy
- Attendance: 283,000

Pole position
Driver	(Brazil) Ayrton Senna	McLaren-Honda
- Time: 1:38.041

Fastest lap
Driver	(France) Alain Prost (Note: Ayrton Senna set the fastest lap of 1:43.025 on lap 38, but this was annulled due to his disqualification.)	McLaren-Honda
- Time: 1:43.506 on lap 43

Podium
First	(Italy) Alessandro Nannini	Benetton-Ford
Second	(Italy) Riccardo Patrese	Williams-Renault
Third	(Belgium) Thierry Boutsen	Williams-Renault
- Lap leaders: Ayrton Senna disqualified post-race, losing victory.

The 1989 Japanese Grand Prix (formally the XV Fuji Television Japanese Grand Prix) was a Formula One motor race held on 22 October 1989 at Suzuka Circuit. It was the 15th and penultimate round of the 1989 Formula One season. The 53-lap race was won by Alessandro Nannini for the Benetton team, from a sixth position start. Riccardo Patrese finished second for the Williams team, with Thierry Boutsen third. It was Nannini's only win.

The race is one of the most famous in F1 history, as the culmination of Alain Prost and Ayrton Senna's tumultuous two-year rivalry as teammates at McLaren. With Prost leading the championship by 16 points, Senna had to win both races to possibly defend the championship, and with Prost leading the race, too, on lap 47 of 53 the Brazilian tried to pass at the inside of the chicane. Senna failed to get ahead, failed to turn in, and made both cars go straight, with his front wheels always behind Prost's wheels. Both cars came to a stop next to each other at the entry of the escape road, both had missed the entry to the chicane. Prost abandoned his stalled car, while Senna got his restarted by marshals, weaved through the barriers, rejoined the track after the chicane, made a pit stop to change his front wing, and overhauled Alessandro Nannini to take the checkered flag. Following the race Senna was disqualified for getting an advantage by missing the chicane, handing the win to Nannini and the title to Prost.

== Pre-race ==
As in 1988, the McLaren team had been dominant throughout 1989. Going into this race, Prost had a 16-point lead in the Drivers' Championship over Senna, 76 to 60. The Brazilian had won six races to the Frenchman's four, including the previous race in Spain, but had only finished in the points on one other occasion, while Prost had only finished out of the points once all season. Therefore, Senna had to win both this race and the final race in Australia to have any chance of retaining his World Drivers' Championship. However, if Senna did win the last two races, he would be champion regardless of where Prost finished, due to the dropped scores system.

Prost had told team boss Ron Dennis before the race that in the past he had left the door open if Senna challenged so as not to take both team cars out, but he would not be leaving the door open on this day.

== Qualifying ==
=== Pre-qualifying report ===
Nicola Larini was fastest in the Friday morning pre-qualifying session for the second Grand Prix in a row, the Osella driver just edging out Philippe Alliot in his Larrousse-Lola. A surprising third place was the Zakspeed of Bernd Schneider, who had not pre-qualified since the first race of the season in Brazil. The car's underpowered Yamaha engine had undergone some testing and development work since the last race, with some clear improvement made. "Our season starts here", Schneider said. The fourth pre-qualifying spot went to Michele Alboreto in the other Lola.

Larini's team-mate Piercarlo Ghinzani missed out this time in fifth place, with Roberto Moreno sixth in his Coloni. The Onyx team failed to get either car through to the main qualifying sessions for the first time since the third round at Monaco, as Stefan Johansson could only manage seventh after a fuel pump failure. Zakspeed's improvement could only help Aguri Suzuki to eighth place, his fifteenth straight failure to pre-qualify. Oscar Larrauri was ninth in the EuroBrun, ahead of the other Onyx of JJ Lehto. The AGS team had spent three days testing in France, but were both well off the pace in this session, with only Enrico Bertaggia's Coloni below them on the time sheets, as the Italian failed to post a time.

=== Pre-qualifying classification ===
Pos	No	Driver	Constructor	Time	Gap
1	17	(Italy) Nicola Larini	Osella-Ford	1:43.035	—
2	30	(France) Philippe Alliot	Lola-Lamborghini	1:43.089	+0.054
3	34	(West Germany) Bernd Schneider	Zakspeed-Yamaha	1:44.053	+1.018
4	29	(Italy) Michele Alboreto	Lola-Lamborghini	1:44.075	+1.040
5	18	(Italy) Piercarlo Ghinzani	Osella-Ford	1:44.313	+1.278
6	31	(Brazil) Roberto Moreno	Coloni-Ford	1:44.498	+1.463
7	36	(Sweden) Stefan Johansson	Onyx-Ford	1:44.582	+1.547
8	35	(Japan) Aguri Suzuki	Zakspeed-Yamaha	1:44.780	+1.745
9	33	(Argentina) Oscar Larrauri	EuroBrun-Judd	1:45.446	+2.411
10	37	(Finland) JJ Lehto	Onyx-Ford	1:45.787	+2.752
11	40	(Italy) Gabriele Tarquini	AGS-Ford	1:46.705	+3.670
12	41	(France) Yannick Dalmas	AGS-Ford	1:48.306	+5.271
13	32	(Italy) Enrico Bertaggia	Coloni-Ford	no time	—

=== Qualifying report ===
As expected, the two McLarens dominated qualifying. Even so, Senna was easily the class of the field, posting a time over a second and a half faster than teammate Prost. As would quickly become clear in the race though, Prost was aware early on in the event that the McLarens were sufficiently superior to all the other cars on the grid, that even with his car setup fully optimised for the race, he could qualify on the front row alongside Senna, but with a car setup far better suited to the demands of the race than his teammate – he would just need to beat the Brazilian off the line at the start and he would have a considerable advantage during the race, as would be seen. The Ferraris of Gerhard Berger and Nigel Mansell filled the second row, with Berger just edging his own teammate into fourth place by two-tenths of a second. The Williams of Riccardo Patrese was half a second behind Mansell in fifth place, and joining him on row three was fellow Italian Alessandro Nannini in his Benetton-Ford using the development HBA4 V8 engine. Behind Nannini positions were closely contested, with only six-tenths of a second covering the next six qualifying times, including that of former World Champion Nelson Piquet's Lotus-Judd in eleventh position. Jonathan Palmer's Tyrrell-Ford took the final grid slot in twenty-sixth place, while four failed to qualify (including former Ferrari drivers René Arnoux and Michele Alboreto who between them had won 12 Grands Prix), with nine drivers failing to pre-qualify.

Bernd Schneider qualified the Zakspeed-Yamaha for only its second race of the season (he also qualified for the season opener in Brazil). Schneider qualified 21st, only 4.851 seconds slower than Senna. Schneider's teammate Aguri Suzuki was not as successful in his home Grand Prix. After making his F1 debut for the Larrousse team at Suzuka in 1988, Suzuki recorded his 15th straight failure to pre-qualify the under-powered Zakspeed.

=== Qualifying classification ===
Pos	No	Driver	Constructor	Q1	Q2	Gap
1	1	(Brazil) Ayrton Senna	McLaren-Honda	1:39.493	1:38.041	—
2	2	(France) Alain Prost	McLaren-Honda	1:40.875	1:39.771	+1.730
3	28	(Austria) Gerhard Berger	Ferrari	1:41.253	1:40.187	+2.146
4	27	(United Kingdom) Nigel Mansell	Ferrari	1:40.608	1:40.406	+2.365
5	6	(Italy) Riccardo Patrese	Williams-Renault	1:42.397	1:40.936	+2.895
6	19	(Italy) Alessandro Nannini	Benetton-Ford	1:41.601	1:41.103	+3.062
7	5	(Belgium) Thierry Boutsen	Williams-Renault	1:42.943	1:41.324	+3.283
8	30	(France) Philippe Alliot	Lola-Lamborghini	1:42.534	1:41.336	+3.295
9	8	(Italy) Stefano Modena	Brabham-Judd	1:42.909	1:41.458	+3.417
10	17	(Italy) Nicola Larini	Osella-Ford	1:42.483	1:41.519	+3.478
11	11	(Brazil) Nelson Piquet	Lotus-Judd	1:43.386	1:41.802	+3.761
12	12	(Japan) Satoru Nakajima	Lotus-Judd	1:43.370	1:41.988	+3.947
13	7	(United Kingdom) Martin Brundle	Brabham-Judd	1:44.236	1:42.182	+4.141
14	24	(Spain) Luis Pérez-Sala	Minardi-Ford	1:43.107	1:42.283	+4.242
15	21	(Italy) Alex Caffi	Dallara-Ford	1:43.171	1:42.488	+4.447
16	22	(Italy) Andrea de Cesaris	Dallara-Ford	1:43.904	1:42.581	+4.540
17	16	(Italy) Ivan Capelli	March-Judd	1:43.851	1:42.672	+4.631
18	4	(France) Jean Alesi	Tyrrell-Ford	1:43.306	1:42.709	+4.668
19	23	(Italy) Paolo Barilla	Minardi-Ford	1:46.096	1:42.780	+4.739
20	15	(Brazil) Maurício Gugelmin	March-Judd	1:44.805	1:42.880	+4.839
21	34	(West Germany) Bernd Schneider	Zakspeed-Yamaha	1:44.323	1:42.892	+4.851
22	20	(Italy) Emanuele Pirro	Benetton-Ford	1:43.217	1:43.063	+5.022
23	26	(France) Olivier Grouillard	Ligier-Ford	1:45.801	1:43.379	+5.338
24	10	(United States) Eddie Cheever	Arrows-Ford	1:44.501	1:43.511	+5.470
25	9	(United Kingdom) Derek Warwick	Arrows-Ford	1:44.288	1:43.599	+5.558
26	3	(United Kingdom) Jonathan Palmer	Tyrrell-Ford	1:43.955	1:43.757	+5.716
27	25	(France) René Arnoux	Ligier-Ford	1:44.221	1:44.030	+5.989
28	29	(Italy) Michele Alboreto	Lola-Lamborghini	1:44.063	1:44.101	+6.022
29	38	(France) Pierre-Henri Raphanel	Rial-Ford	2:11.328	1:47.160	+9.119
30	39	(Belgium) Bertrand Gachot	Rial-Ford	1:50.883	1:47.295	+9.254

== Race ==
=== Race report ===
To improve his straight-line speed, Prost had his Gurney flap removed before the race, without Senna's knowledge, as revealed by Formula One journalist Maurice Hamilton. At the start, Prost got away much faster than Senna as he was hoping, instantly wiping out the Brazilian's pole position advantage. In fact, Senna's start was so poor that Gerhard Berger managed to get alongside him from his third place on the grid. But Senna's McLaren had the inside line into the first corner, and he managed to keep the Ferrari behind him. With a race-setup now clearly superior to his teammate's, over the first half of the race Prost steadily built his lead up to almost six seconds, and then Senna lost an additional two seconds due to a slow pitstop. However, with a new set of tyres on the balance of power shifted, and the reigning World Champion began to reel in the French double World Champion.

Behind the leading pair, after his initial charge, Gerhard Berger's Ferrari gearbox failed on lap 34, and the sister Ferrari of Nigel Mansell suffered engine failure nine laps later. With the Scuderia's cars gone, all real challenge to the McLaren charge had evaporated. The only opposition left for Senna and Prost was each other as they were drawing away from the new third placed man Alessandro Nannini. The Italian's Benetton used the less powerful, but more reliable, HBA1 engine in the race and not the development HBA4. His teammate Emanuele Pirro did use the development V8 in the race, and while he was not as quick as Nannini, he did use it to move up to 10th after starting 22nd. Pirro's race ended on lap 33 after a collision at the hairpin with Andrea de Cesaris where Pirro ran into the back of his fellow Italian's Dallara.

Senna finally caught Prost on lap 40, and for the next five laps the gap between the two remained at approximately one second as the two McLaren drivers tried to position themselves tactically. Prost had greater top speed on the straights, while Senna's high-downforce settings gave him the advantage through the corners. On lap 47 Senna used his greater cornering speed to make sure that he remained close behind Prost's car through the challenging, double-apex Spoon Corner. This put Senna's car directly in the aerodynamic tow from the leading McLaren, negating much of Prost's straight line advantage. Through the infamous 130R, ultra high-speed, left curve, Senna cut Prost's lead still further, putting his MP4/5 only two car lengths behind his rival.

The next corner after 130R is the chicane, the second-slowest corner on the circuit. As Prost began to brake for the corner Senna dove to the inside but never came fully alongside, his front wheels remaining just behind those of Prost. Prost then turned towards the apex to take the normal racing line, but with Senna there on the inside line, the two cars made contact. With their wheels locked and their engines stalled, the two cars came to a halt at the mouth of the partially blocked chicane escape road, thus having missed the chicane entry. As the vehicles were directly in the line of any possible out of control cars, the marshals hurried to clear them. While Prost unbuckled his belts and left his car in neutral to be removed, Senna gestured to the marshals to push him down the escape road. As the McLaren was pushed forward, Senna used the forward motion to restart his engine, and after it fired he immediately accelerated down the escape road, weaving between the temporary chicane bollards arranged in the roadway.

Although his car was running, Senna's MP4/5 had suffered damage to its front wing during the collision, and while Prost slowly wandered back to the nearby pit lane, Senna had to complete almost an entire lap of the circuit before pitting for a repair. Once his nosecone had been replaced Senna continued the race. Some indication of McLaren-Honda's dominance is shown by the fact that – despite the collision, the subsequent period spent stalled, the slow in-lap, and the pit stop delay while his car was repaired – when Senna rejoined the race he was only five seconds behind the new race leader, Alessandro Nannini.

Senna did not take long to catch Nannini's Benetton-Ford. He passed the Italian only two laps after having his nosecone replaced, in exactly the same place as the collision with Prost had occurred. Unlike Prost, Nannini had a different car, different engine, thus didn't put up a significant fight, a locked wheel the only indication of how hard he tried to keep Senna behind.

Two laps later Senna took the chequered flag. Nannini finished in second place, followed by the two Williams-Renaults of Riccardo Patrese and Thierry Boutsen who had driven in tandem and off the pace throughout the race. The only other driver on the same lap as the podium was Nelson Piquet in 4th; almost a lap down, but still far better placed than the eleventh position he started his Lotus-Judd in, mostly due to the race's high attrition rate. Only eleven of the twenty-six starters were still running at the finish. Behind Piquet were two British drivers who also benefited from the misfortune of others, and while Martin Brundle's sixth-place finish was remarkable enough, Derek Warwick had come from 25th at the back row of the grid in his Arrows to take a seventh place. In a ploy that worked a treat for him, before the race Warwick had taken the extraordinary step of removing virtually all downforce from his car in the hopes that the extra straight line speed would give him an advantage.

=== Post-race ===
Immediately after the race, Senna was disqualified by race stewards for missing the chicane following his collision with Prost. Senna personally alleged that the decision had been made by FISA President Jean-Marie Balestre to give the championship to his fellow countryman Prost (the race stewards and Balestre both denied this was the case, stating that the FISA boss was not even present at the stewards meeting when the decision to disqualify Senna was made). Nannini was awarded the victory as a result, and he took the podium ceremony with Patrese and Boutsen. This would prove to be Nannini's only victory in a Formula One career that was cut short by a helicopter crash almost exactly a year later, which severed his right forearm. Senna's disqualification also meant that it was mathematically impossible for him to overhaul Prost's points total, and so the 1989 Drivers' Championship went to the Frenchman.

As he had gained no competitive advantage by missing the chicane, Senna and McLaren attempted to appeal the disqualification ruling. McLaren boss Ron Dennis explained that it had nothing to do with stopping Prost (who was leaving McLaren for Ferrari) winning the championship, it was that the team strongly felt they had a win taken away from them by an incorrect ruling, and that resulted in a loss of prize money and bonus sponsorship money. At the FISA hearing in Paris later the same week, Senna's disqualification was not only upheld, but an additional US$100,000 fine and suspended six-month ban were imposed on the driver (FISA also labeled Senna as a "dangerous driver"). Ever since the incident, there has been much debate as to whether Prost intentionally ran into Senna, whether Senna was overambitious in his overtaking move, or whether the collision was simply a racing incident between two embittered teammates.

=== Race classification ===
Pos	No	Driver	Constructor	Tyre	Laps	Time/Retired	Grid	Points
1	19	(Italy) Alessandro Nannini	Benetton-Ford	G	53	1:35:06.277	6	9
2	6	(Italy) Riccardo Patrese	Williams-Renault	G	53	+ 11.904	5	6
3	5	(Belgium) Thierry Boutsen	Williams-Renault	G	53	+ 13.446	7	4
4	11	(Brazil) Nelson Piquet	Lotus-Judd	G	53	+ 1:44.225	11	3
5	7	(United Kingdom) Martin Brundle	Brabham-Judd	P	52	+ 1 Lap	13	2
6	9	(United Kingdom) Derek Warwick	Arrows-Ford	G	52	+ 1 Lap	25	1
7	15	(Brazil) Maurício Gugelmin	March-Judd	G	52	+ 1 Lap	20	
8	10	(United States) Eddie Cheever	Arrows-Ford	G	52	+ 1 Lap	24	
9	21	(Italy) Alex Caffi	Dallara-Ford	P	52	+ 1 Lap	15	
10	22	(Italy) Andrea de Cesaris	Dallara-Ford	P	51	+ 2 Laps	16	
Ret	2	(France) Alain Prost	McLaren-Honda	G	47	Collision	2	
Ret	8	(Italy) Stefano Modena	Brabham-Judd	P	46	Engine	9	
Ret	27	(United Kingdom) Nigel Mansell	Ferrari	G	43	Engine	4	
Ret	12	(Japan) Satoru Nakajima	Lotus-Judd	G	41	Engine	12	
Ret	4	(France) Jean Alesi	Tyrrell-Ford	G	37	Gearbox	18	
Ret	30	(France) Philippe Alliot	Lola-Lamborghini	G	36	Engine	8	
Ret	28	(Austria) Gerhard Berger	Ferrari	G	34	Gearbox	3	
Ret	20	(Italy) Emanuele Pirro	Benetton-Ford	G	33	Collision	22	
Ret	26	(France) Olivier Grouillard	Ligier-Ford	G	31	Engine	23	
Ret	16	(Italy) Ivan Capelli	March-Judd	G	27	Suspension	17	
Ret	17	(Italy) Nicola Larini	Osella-Ford	P	21	Brakes	10	
Ret	3	(United Kingdom) Jonathan Palmer	Tyrrell-Ford	G	20	Fuel Leak	26	
Ret	34	(West Germany) Bernd Schneider	Zakspeed-Yamaha	P	1	Gearbox	21	
Ret	24	(Spain) Luis Pérez-Sala	Minardi-Ford	P	0	Collision	14	
Ret	23	(Italy) Paolo Barilla	Minardi-Ford	P	0	Clutch	19	
DSQ	1	(Brazil) Ayrton Senna	McLaren-Honda	G	53	Rejoined Track Illegally^{1}	1	
DNQ	25	(France) René Arnoux	Ligier–Ford	G				
DNQ	29	(Italy) Michele Alboreto	Lola–Lamborghini	G				
DNQ	38	(France) Pierre-Henri Raphanel	Rial–Ford	G				
DNQ	39	(Belgium) Bertrand Gachot	Rial–Ford	G				
DNPQ	18	(Italy) Piercarlo Ghinzani	Osella–Ford	P				
DNPQ	31	(Brazil) Roberto Moreno	Coloni–Ford	P				
DNPQ	36	(Sweden) Stefan Johansson	Onyx–Ford	G				
DNPQ	35	(Japan) Aguri Suzuki	Zakspeed–Yamaha	P				
DNPQ	33	(Argentina) Oscar Larrauri	EuroBrun–Judd	P				
DNPQ	37	(Finland) JJ Lehto	Onyx–Ford	G				
DNPQ	40	(Italy) Gabriele Tarquini	AGS–Ford	G				
DNPQ	41	(France) Yannick Dalmas	AGS–Ford	G				
DNPQ	32	(Italy) Enrico Bertaggia	Coloni–Ford	P				

Notes

- ^1 – Ayrton Senna originally finished 1st, but was disqualified for rejoining the track illegally following his collision with Alain Prost.

== Championship standings after the race ==
- **Bold text** indicates World Champions.

Drivers' Championship standings

Pos	Driver	Points
1	(France) **Alain Prost**	76 (81)
2	(Brazil) Ayrton Senna	60
3	(United Kingdom) Nigel Mansell	38
4	(Italy) Riccardo Patrese	36
5	(Belgium) Thierry Boutsen	28

Constructors' Championship standings

Pos	Constructor	Points
1	(United Kingdom) **McLaren-Honda**	141
2	(United Kingdom) Williams-Renault	64
3	(Italy) Ferrari	59
4	(United Kingdom) Benetton-Ford	31
5	(United Kingdom) Tyrrell-Ford	16

- Note: Only the top five positions are included for both sets of standings.

== Footnotes ==
[2] Reali Júnior, Elpídio (6 November 1996). "Balestre admite ter ajudado Prost contra Senna". O Estado de S. Paulo. Retrieved 11 July 2017.

Previous race: 1989 Spanish Grand Prix	FIA Formula One World Championship; 1989 season	Next race: 1989 Australian Grand Prix
Previous race: 1988 Japanese Grand Prix	Japanese Grand Prix	Next race: 1990 Japanese Grand Prix
Awards
Preceded by 1988 British Grand Prix	Formula One Promotional Trophy for Race Promoter; 1989	Succeeded by 1990 Australian Grand Prix
