= 1990 Japanese Grand Prix =

15th round of the 1990 Formula One World Championship

- Race 15 of 16 in the 1990 Formula One World Championship

Race details
- Date: 21 October 1990
- Official name: XVI Fuji Television Japanese Grand Prix
- Location: Suzuka Circuit, Suzuka, Mie, Japan
- Course: Permanent racing facility
- Course length: 5.860 km (3.641 miles)
- Distance: 53 laps, 310.580 km (192.985 miles)
- Weather: Sunny
- Attendance: 316,000

Pole position
Driver	(Brazil) Ayrton Senna	McLaren-Honda
- Time: 1:36.996

Fastest lap
Driver	(Italy) Riccardo Patrese	Williams-Renault
- Time: 1:44.233 on lap 40

Podium
First	(Brazil) Nelson Piquet	Benetton-Ford
Second	(Brazil) Roberto Moreno	Benetton-Ford
Third	(Japan) Aguri Suzuki	Lola-Lamborghini

The 1990 Japanese Grand Prix was a Formula One motor race held on 21 October 1990 at Suzuka Circuit, the fifteenth and penultimate race of the 1990 Formula One World Championship. It was the 16th Japanese Grand Prix and the 6th held at Suzuka. The race saw a first-corner collision between World Championship rivals Brazilian driver Ayrton Senna and French driver Alain Prost, the second consecutive year that the World Championship had been decided by a collision of Senna coming from behind shunting Prost off the Japanese track. This time, with Senna leading in the standings, the "absolutely predictable" (Murray Walker) collision immediately put both cars out of the race and secured Senna his second World Championship, a reversal of fortunes from the 1989 Japanese Grand Prix, where the collision had secured the third championship for Prost.

The race saw a best result to that point for the Benetton Formula team, with their drivers Brazilian veteran Nelson Piquet and his protégé Roberto Moreno finishing first and second in their Benetton B190s. It was back to back wins for Benetton in Japan after the team's win the previous year. Japanese driver Aguri Suzuki scored a career-best result for himself, the Larrousse team and the Lamborghini engine, finishing third in his Lola LC90. With Ferrari scoring no points after Nigel Mansell's retirement, the McLaren team secured their sixth and third consecutive Constructors' Championship.

As of 2026, this was the last race where no European driver finished the race on the podium, with two South American drivers and an Asian driver filling the top three positions. It was also the only race where the Larrousse team scored a podium finish during their eight seasons of competing in Formula One, and the first and only podium finish for the Lamborghini V12 engine in Formula One. Suzuki's podium finish was the first for a Japanese driver and Asian driver (later matched by Takuma Sato and Kamui Kobayashi) and the last for a Japanese driver at his home race until Kamui Kobayashi did so at the 2012 Japanese Grand Prix. Moreover, it was the last of Brazil's eleven one-twos in Formula One, the only one featuring Piquet and Moreno; of the other ten, eight featured Piquet and Senna and the other two had Emerson Fittipaldi and José Carlos Pace.

== Pre-race ==
Before the race, Brabham announced that they would use Yamaha engines for 1991, while Footwork announced a Porsche engine deal for 1991 and retained both their 1990 drivers, Alex Caffi and Michele Alboreto. Prior to the race, the Life Racing Engines and EuroBrun teams withdrew from the sport. EuroBrun's Roberto Moreno joined the Benetton team replacing the previous year's race winner Alessandro Nannini, who was unable to attend the race following a helicopter crash that also ended his Formula One career, one week after the Spanish Grand Prix. Jean Alesi did not start after suffering a neck injury during Friday's practice. As his grid position was left empty, this was the third consecutive race to have only 25 starters instead of the usual 26. Nigel Mansell also announced a U-turn on his decision to retire by making public his agreement to join Williams-Renault for two years from 1991 after being given assurances from Frank Williams, Patrick Head, and Renault that they could deliver him a car in which he could win a World Championship and that he would be the team's undisputed No. 1 driver. On Saturday, Soichiro Honda, the founder of Honda, met Ayrton Senna in the McLaren pit.

== Qualifying ==
=== Qualifying report ===
After the withdrawal of the EuroBrun and Life teams, there was no need for a pre-qualifying session as only 30 cars remained in the event. The four drivers relieved of the necessity to pre-qualify, Yannick Dalmas, Gabriele Tarquini (both AGS), Olivier Grouillard (Osella) and Bertrand Gachot (Coloni) were ultimately the four drivers that failed to qualify for the race. Gachot crashed heavily in the Friday session. Roberto Moreno, who had left EuroBrun and joined Benetton, qualified easily in ninth position.

=== Qualifying classification ===
Pos	No	Driver	Constructor	Q1	Q2	Gap
1	27	(Brazil) Ayrton Senna	McLaren-Honda	1:38.828	1:36.996	—
2	1	(France) Alain Prost	Ferrari	1:38.684	1:37.228	+0.232
3	2	(United Kingdom) Nigel Mansell	Ferrari	1:38.969	1:37.719	+0.723
4	28	(Austria) Gerhard Berger	McLaren-Honda	1:38.374	1:38.118	+1.122
5	5	(Belgium) Thierry Boutsen	Williams-Renault	1:39.577	1:39.324	+2.328
6	20	(Brazil) Nelson Piquet	Benetton-Ford	1:41.041	1:40.049	+3.053
7	4	(France) Jean Alesi	Tyrrell-Ford	1:40.052	no time	+3.056
8	6	(Italy) Riccardo Patrese	Williams-Renault	1:40.355	1:40.664	+3.359
9	19	(Brazil) Roberto Moreno	Benetton-Ford	1:41.719	1:40.579	+3.583
10	30	(Japan) Aguri Suzuki	Lola-Lamborghini	1:41.442	1:40.888	+3.892
11	23	(Italy) Pierluigi Martini	Minardi-Ford	1:40.899	1:41.964	+3.903
12	11	(United Kingdom) Derek Warwick	Lotus-Lamborghini	1:41.482	1:41.024	+4.028
13	16	(Italy) Ivan Capelli	Leyton House-Judd	1:41.657	1:41.033	+4.037
14	3	(Japan) Satoru Nakajima	Tyrrell-Ford	1:41.208	1:41.078	+4.082
15	12	(United Kingdom) Johnny Herbert	Lotus-Lamborghini	1:43.111	1:41.558	+4.562
16	15	(Brazil) Maurício Gugelmin	Leyton House-Judd	1:42.049	1:41.698	+4.702
17	29	(France) Éric Bernard	Lola-Lamborghini	1:42.141	1:41.709	+4.713
18	25	(Italy) Nicola Larini	Ligier-Ford	1:43.396	1:42.339	+5.343
19	21	(Italy) Emanuele Pirro	Dallara-Ford	1:40.230	1:42.361	+5.365
20	24	(Italy) Gianni Morbidelli	Minardi-Ford	1:42.858	1:42.364	+5.368
21	26	(France) Philippe Alliot	Ligier-Ford	1:44.106	1:42.593	+5.597
22	8	(Italy) Stefano Modena	Brabham-Judd	1:42.617	no time	+5.621
23	7	(Australia) David Brabham	Brabham-Judd	1:43.156	no time	+6.160
24	10	(Italy) Alex Caffi	Arrows-Ford	1:43.270	1:43.887	+6.274
25	9	(Italy) Michele Alboreto	Arrows-Ford	1:43.304	1:43.610	+6.308
26	22	(Italy) Andrea de Cesaris	Dallara-Ford	1:43.601	1:43.647	+6.605
27	14	(France) Olivier Grouillard	Osella-Ford	1:43.993	1:43.782	+6.786
28	17	(Italy) Gabriele Tarquini	AGS-Ford	1:44.281	29:56.038	+7.285
29	18	(France) Yannick Dalmas	AGS-Ford	1:44.410	1:46.326	+7.414
30	31	(Belgium) Bertrand Gachot	Coloni-Ford	20:22.535	1:45.393	+8.397

== Race ==
=== Race report ===
Ayrton Senna qualified on pole but was unhappy with the dirty side of the track it was situated on, arguing that pole should always be on the racing line. He and Gerhard Berger then went to the Japanese stewards to request a change of position of pole to the cleaner left side of the track. The stewards initially agreed but a last minute injunction by FISA president Jean Marie Balestre rejected the decision and the original pole position remained on the dirtier right side of the track. In addition, the FIA had warned that crossing the yellow line of the pit exit on the right to better position oneself at the first corner would not be permitted, further infuriating Senna. At the start, Prost took the lead but Senna attempted to take the inside line into the first corner. The two drivers made contact, sending both off the track and into instant retirement. The crash meant that Senna had clinched the Drivers' Championship for a second time, as with one race left in the season, Prost could not overtake his points tally. Benetton-Ford's dominance of the podium prevented Ferrari from scoring enough points to stop McLaren clinching its sixth constructors' title. After the collision, the race proceeded with Gerhard Berger's McLaren MP4/5B leading and Nigel Mansell's Ferrari 641 second. On lap 2, Berger spun off at the first corner on sand thrown onto the track by the Senna/Prost collision, leaving Mansell to lead the race from the two Benettons of Nelson Piquet and Roberto Moreno. Anticipating that Benetton would follow their usual strategy of not making a pit stop, Mansell built up a gap until he pitted for tyres at the end of lap 26. After a quick stop, he left his box with heavy wheelspin, and a driveshaft failed. The Ferrari pulled over at the end of the pit lane and retired. Piquet inherited the lead and retained it until the chequered flag, with his teammate Moreno following closely, achieving Benetton's first one-two finish. Aguri Suzuki also drove a non-stop race, finishing third, the first Japanese driver to do so. The two Williams FW13B-Renaults of Riccardo Patrese and Thierry Boutsen finished fourth and fifth, while Satoru Nakajima finished sixth in a Tyrrell 019, the second Japanese driver in the points. Both Suzuki and Moreno achieved their only career podiums in Formula One.

=== Reaction ===
Prost and Senna discussed the event afterwards, with Senna claiming it was not how he wanted it but how it had to be. Prost was infuriated by this, and described the move as "disgusting" and Senna as "a man without value". He later said that he almost retired from the sport instantly after the incident.

After winning his third and final World Championship in 1991, Senna admitted that his move was deliberate, and that it was a payback for 1989. The pair went on to win one more championship each (Senna in 1991 and Prost in 1993) and eventually reconciled their differences on the podium in their final race together at the 1993 Australian Grand Prix.

In a discussion with his fellow Grand Prix commentator Murray Walker at the BBC in 1991, 1976 World Champion James Hunt defended Senna, stating that Senna had been improprerly blamed for not only last year's collision, but also this collision, and that Prost was at fault for not letting Senna have any room in both incidents:

"Oh no, I think he [Senna] took an awful lot of vilification from Balestre over a period of a couple of years. He feels with great justification in my opinion that Balestre singlehandedly robbed him of the world championship which Senna is the be-all and end-all and when he finally won this year with Balestre out of the way, he snapped in a moment of adrenaline and I think – to my opinion – that humanised him." When Walker stated that Senna had admitted to deliberately crash into Prost, Hunt denied those claims as follows: "No, he didn't. You didn't listen; he absolutely did not. He neither said that he pushed Prost off, nor did he push him off, right? And that is what a lot of the idiot press picked up, they all said that. He said that he had decided before the race that he would not gonna give way, right? In fact, he never stuck to that. If you look at the replay, he did give way on the kerb on the inside trying to avoid Prost who was driving into him, right? And once more the year before, Prost drove into him without any doubt at all at the hairpin in Japan." At Walker's susbequent question, that he believes that Senna was the innocent party in both incidents, Hunt replied: "Absolutely! If you look at the replays of both, Prost turned into the corner on both occasions way before the normal turning-in point, right? And the other thing is that in the second incident at the first corner, right, it was a testimony to the fact that Prost's previously excellent brain had collapsed totally because the only person who did not need to be pushed off without a doubt that race was Prost and he pushed himself off. The evidence is there for everybody to see, this one is not a question of views, this one is a question of looking at the evidence."

=== Race classification ===
Pos	No	Driver	Constructor	Tyre	Laps	Time/Retired	Grid	Points
1	20	(Brazil) Nelson Piquet	Benetton-Ford	G	53	1:34:36.824	6	9
2	19	(Brazil) Roberto Moreno	Benetton-Ford	G	53	+7.223	8	6
3	30	(Japan) Aguri Suzuki	Lola-Lamborghini	G	53	+22.469	9	4
4	6	(Italy) Riccardo Patrese	Williams-Renault	G	53	+36.258	7	3
5	5	(Belgium) Thierry Boutsen	Williams-Renault	G	53	+46.884	5	2
6	3	(Japan) Satoru Nakajima	Tyrrell-Ford	P	53	+1:12.350	13	1
7	25	(Italy) Nicola Larini	Ligier-Ford	G	52	+1 lap	17	
8	23	(Italy) Pierluigi Martini	Minardi-Ford	P	52	+1 lap	10	
9	10	(Italy) Alex Caffi	Arrows-Ford	G	52	+1 lap	23	
10	26	(France) Philippe Alliot	Ligier-Ford	G	52	+1 lap	20	
Ret	11	(United Kingdom) Derek Warwick	Lotus-Lamborghini	G	38	Gearbox	11	
Ret	12	(United Kingdom) Johnny Herbert	Lotus-Lamborghini	G	31	Engine	14	
Ret	9	(Italy) Michele Alboreto	Arrows-Ford	G	28	Engine	24	
Ret	2	(United Kingdom) Nigel Mansell	Ferrari	G	26	Halfshaft	3	
Ret	21	(Italy) Emanuele Pirro	Dallara-Ford	P	24	Alternator	18	
Ret	29	(France) Éric Bernard	Lola-Lamborghini	G	24	Engine	16	
Ret	24	(Italy) Gianni Morbidelli	Minardi-Ford	P	18	Spun off	19	
Ret	16	(Italy) Ivan Capelli	Leyton House-Judd	G	16	Ignition	12	
Ret	22	(Italy) Andrea de Cesaris	Dallara-Ford	P	13	Spun off	25	
Ret	15	(Brazil) Maurício Gugelmin	Leyton House-Judd	G	5	Engine	15	
Ret	7	(Australia) David Brabham	Brabham-Judd	P	5	Clutch	22	
Ret	28	(Austria) Gerhard Berger	McLaren-Honda	G	1	Spun off	4	
Ret	27	(Brazil) Ayrton Senna	McLaren-Honda	G	0	Collision	1	
Ret	1	(France) Alain Prost	Ferrari	G	0	Collision	2	
Ret	8	(Italy) Stefano Modena	Brabham-Judd	P	0	Collision	21	
DNS	4	(France) Jean Alesi	Tyrrell-Ford	P		Driver injured		
DNQ	14	(France) Olivier Grouillard	Osella-Ford	P				
DNQ	17	(Italy) Gabriele Tarquini	AGS-Ford	G				
DNQ	18	(France) Yannick Dalmas	AGS-Ford	G				
DNQ	31	(Belgium) Bertrand Gachot	Coloni-Ford	G				

== Championship standings after the race ==
- **Bold text** indicates World Champions.

Drivers' Championship standings

Pos	Driver	Points
1	(Brazil) **Ayrton Senna**	78
2	(France) Alain Prost	69
3	(Austria) Gerhard Berger	40
4	(Brazil) Nelson Piquet	35
5	(Belgium) Thierry Boutsen	32

Constructors' Championship standings

Pos	Constructor	Points
1	(United Kingdom) **McLaren-Honda**	118
2	(Italy) Ferrari	100
3	(United Kingdom) Benetton-Ford	62
4	(United Kingdom) Williams-Renault	54
5	(United Kingdom) Tyrrell-Ford	16

- Note: Only the top five positions are included for both sets of standings.

Previous race: 1990 Spanish Grand Prix	FIA Formula One World Championship; 1990 season	Next race: 1990 Australian Grand Prix
Previous race: 1989 Japanese Grand Prix	Japanese Grand Prix	Next race: 1991 Japanese Grand Prix
