= 1990 Australian Grand Prix =

Race 16 of 16 in the 1990 Formula One World Championship
← Previous race	Next race →

Race details
- Date: 4 November 1990
- Official name: LV Foster's Australian Grand Prix
- Location: Adelaide Street Circuit; Adelaide, South Australia, Australia
- Course: Temporary street circuit
- Course length: 3.780 km (2.349 miles)
- Distance: 81 laps, 306.180 km (190.251 miles)
- Weather: Sunny

Pole position
Driver	(Brazil) Ayrton Senna	McLaren-Honda
- Time: 1:15.671

Fastest lap
Driver	(United Kingdom) Nigel Mansell	Ferrari
- Time: 1:18.203 on lap 75

Podium
First	(Brazil) Nelson Piquet	Benetton-Ford
Second	(United Kingdom) Nigel Mansell	Ferrari
Third	(France) Alain Prost	Ferrari

The 1990 Australian Grand Prix was a Formula One motor race held at Adelaide on 4 November 1990. It was the sixteenth and final race of the 1990 Formula One World Championship, and the 500th race to contribute to the World Drivers' Championship since the series started in 1950. The race was the 55th Australian Grand Prix, and the sixth to be part of the Formula One World Championship. It was held over 81 laps of the 3.78-kilometre (2.35 mi) circuit for a race distance of 306 kilometres (190 mi).

The race was won by Brazilian driver Nelson Piquet, driving a Benetton-Ford. Briton Nigel Mansell finished second in a Ferrari, with French teammate Alain Prost third. The win, Piquet's second in succession, secured third place for himself in the Drivers' Championship and the same position for Benetton in the Constructors' Championship. Compatriot Ayrton Senna took pole position in his McLaren-Honda and led until he suffered a gearbox failure on lap 62.

== Qualifying ==
=== Qualifying report ===
Ayrton Senna took his tenth pole position of the season, and 52nd overall, in his McLaren-Honda with a time of 1:15.671, the fastest time recorded on the Adelaide street circuit to date. Alongside him on the front row, but over half a second slower, was his teammate Gerhard Berger. In his final race for Ferrari, Nigel Mansell took third, only 0.013 seconds ahead of teammate Alain Prost, followed by Jean Alesi in the Tyrrell and Riccardo Patrese in the Williams. The Benettons of Nelson Piquet and Roberto Moreno were seventh and eighth respectively, with Thierry Boutsen in the second Williams and Pierluigi Martini in the Minardi completing the top ten.

Further down the grid David Brabham, driving for the Brabham team established by his father Jack, qualified 25th, becoming the first Australian to drive in his home race since Alan Jones in 1986.

The four drivers failing to qualify were Michele Alboreto and Alex Caffi in the two Arrows, Yannick Dalmas in the AGS and Bertrand Gachot in the Coloni, the latter completing a clean sweep of non-qualifications for the season.

=== Qualifying classification ===
Pos	No	Driver	Constructor	Q1	Q2	Gap
1	27	(Brazil) Ayrton Senna	McLaren-Honda	1:15.671	1:15.692	
2	28	(Austria) Gerhard Berger	McLaren-Honda	1:17.431	1:16.244	+0.573
3	2	(United Kingdom) Nigel Mansell	Ferrari	1:17.294	1:16.352	+0.681
4	1	(France) Alain Prost	Ferrari	1:16.365	1:17.021	+0.694
5	4	(France) Jean Alesi	Tyrrell-Ford	1:16.837	1:17.246	+1.166
6	6	(Italy) Riccardo Patrese	Williams-Renault	1:17.156	1:17.449	+1.485
7	20	(Brazil) Nelson Piquet	Benetton-Ford	1:17.640	1:17.173	+1.502
8	19	(Brazil) Roberto Moreno	Benetton-Ford	1:17.437	1:18.089	+1.766
9	5	(Belgium) Thierry Boutsen	Williams-Renault	1:17.596	1:18.112	+1.925
10	23	(Italy) Pierluigi Martini	Minardi-Ford	1:18.235	1:17.827	+2.156
11	11	(United Kingdom) Derek Warwick	Lotus-Lamborghini	1:19.579	1:18.351	+2.680
12	25	(Italy) Nicola Larini	Ligier-Ford	1:19.567	1:18.730	+3.059
13	3	(Japan) Satoru Nakajima	Tyrrell-Ford	1:18.738	1:19.066	+3.067
14	16	(Italy) Ivan Capelli	Leyton House-Judd	1:19.341	1:18.843	+3.172
15	22	(Italy) Andrea de Cesaris	Dallara-Ford	1:19.107	1:18.858	+3.187
16	15	(Brazil) Maurício Gugelmin	Leyton House-Judd	1:19.804	1:18.860	+3.189
17	8	(Italy) Stefano Modena	Brabham-Judd	1:19.861	1:18.886	+3.215
18	12	(United Kingdom) Johnny Herbert	Lotus-Lamborghini	1:19.091	1:19.185	+3.420
19	26	(France) Philippe Alliot	Ligier-Ford	1:19.202	1:19.835	+3.531
20	24	(Italy) Gianni Morbidelli	Minardi-Ford	1:19.408	1:19.347	+3.676
21	21	(Italy) Emanuele Pirro	Dallara-Ford	1:19.476	1:19.609	+3.805
22	14	(France) Olivier Grouillard	Osella-Ford	1:21.047	1:19.722	+4.051
23	29	(France) Éric Bernard	Lola-Lamborghini	1:21.489	1:19.858	+4.187
24	30	(Japan) Aguri Suzuki	Lola-Lamborghini	1:19.970	1:20.235	+4.299
25	7	(Australia) David Brabham	Brabham-Judd	1:20.846	1:20.218	+4.547
26	17	(Italy) Gabriele Tarquini	AGS-Ford	1:21.222	1:20.296	+4.625
DNQ	9	(Italy) Michele Alboreto	Arrows-Ford	1:20.630	1:20.545	+4.874
DNQ	18	(France) Yannick Dalmas	AGS-Ford	1:21.342	1:20.570	+4.899
DNQ	10	(Italy) Alex Caffi	Arrows-Ford	1:21.101	1:21.609	+4.938
DNQ	31	(Belgium) Bertrand Gachot	Coloni-Ford	1:23.135	1:23.975	+6.464

== Race ==
=== Pre-race ===
As part of a television interview with Ayrton Senna after qualifying, former triple World Champion Jackie Stewart caused a stir when he claimed that Senna was part of too many race accidents for a driver of his ability compared to all the World Champions of the past. A visibly annoyed Senna stated he could not believe that someone of Stewart's racing experience, someone who knew first hand that accidents are a part of motor racing, would say that he was a dangerous driver, and challenged the Scotsman to go back and check his facts.

On race morning during the drivers briefing, McLaren boss Ron Dennis asked the officials for a ruling on what would happen if anyone decided to effectively straight-line the chicane after the start, asking if it was legal. FISA officials replied that any driver who did that would most likely damage their car so it was not advisable. At that point Alain Prost got up and walked out of the meeting, an action that earned him a 'yellow card' from FISA, but no fine. This puzzled many as walking out of the drivers briefing without good reason usually saw a driver fined.

Then, as per normal practice, the annual end-of-season drivers photo shoot took place prior to the race. As the race was the 500th World Championship Grand Prix there was also a photo shoot taken with several World Champions who were in attendance, including legendary five time Champion Juan Manuel Fangio. Alain Prost, still angry over the events at Suzuka, did not appear in either photo by his own choice as he did not want to appear with Ayrton Senna. This, and his public statements about his former McLaren teammate following the Japanese Grand Prix where he claimed Senna deliberately took him out at the first corner in the race to win the World Championship, lead to criticism of his mental state of mind by some including former World Champion turned BBC commentator James Hunt, who at the time believed the crash at Suzuka was just an accident and that Senna had not taken Prost out on purpose. Senna himself later said in 1991 that he was going to go for it in the first corner no matter the result. In a famous quote he said “If you no longer go for a gap that exists, you are no longer a racing driver”.

Hunt, who as the 1976 Champion was in the photo shoot along with Fangio, Sir Jack Brabham, Denny Hulme, Stewart, and current drivers Senna and Nelson Piquet, claimed during the race commentary that Prost had been mentally beaten down by Senna after losing the championship to him in controversial circumstances and seemed to be "a driver who was under a form of mental collapse".

Other than Prost who chose not to take part, World Championship winning drivers who were still alive but not in the photo shoot due to not being in attendance in Adelaide were Phil Hill (1961), John Surtees (1964), Emerson Fittipaldi (1972 & 1974), Niki Lauda (1975, 1977 & 1984), Mario Andretti (1978), Jody Scheckter (1979), and the winner of the inaugural race in Adelaide Keke Rosberg (1982). The most surprising absentee was Australia's 1980 World Champion Alan Jones who was actually at the circuit that weekend racing a Ford Sierra RS500 in the Group A touring car support races as well as performing duties as a pit reporter for Australian host television broadcaster Channel 9.

=== Race report ===
The winner for the second race in a row was Brazilian veteran Nelson Piquet in his Benetton, giving the triple World Champion back to back wins for the first time since he won the 1987 German and Hungarian Grands Prix while driving for Williams-Honda. He took a 3.129 second victory over Nigel Mansell after the Englishman had tried a passing move under braking for the hairpin at the end of the Brabham Straight which almost took out both cars, Mansell somehow managed to pull his Ferrari up in time to just miss Piquet and the lapped Brabham-Judd of Stefano Modena as they turned into the right hand hairpin. Piquet, who enjoyed a great race, overtook Patrese at the start and Alesi a few corners later. He then took Prost on lap 3 at the end of the long straight and then outbraked Berger for third place at the same place on lap 9. He later overtook Mansell on the pit straight when Mansell's first set of tyres went off.

After making the best start, but being blocked in by the slow starting Berger, Alain Prost drove a steady, but for him unremarkable race other than a rare mistake when he ran wide at Brewery Bend late in the race while trying to stay ahead of the charging Mansell. Prost ran in 5th for most of the race, but eventually finished 3rd after Senna crashed out of the lead on lap 61 with gearbox trouble, and after Berger had also run wide at Brewery Bend and had to back off to conserve his tyres. Berger finished 4th, 9.6 seconds behind Prost. Rounding out the top six were the Williamses of 1989 Australian Grand Prix winner Thierry Boutsen, the last driver on the lead lap and in his last race for Williams, and Riccardo Patrese.

On lap 50, Senna broke Gerhard Berger's 1987 lap record of 1:20.416 (set in the turbocharged Ferrari F1/87) with a time of 1:19.302. In his late race pursuit of Piquet, Mansell continued to lower the lap record and eventually lowered it to 1:18.203 on lap 75. In his efforts to stay ahead of Mansell, Piquet set his fastest race lap on lap 79 with a time of 1:18.527, and then emulated Prost and Berger's earlier feats by running wide at Brewery Bend on lap 80 which allowed Mansell to close within two seconds. Piquet's fastest lap, set on the tyres which he had started the race on, was also the second fastest lap of the race. In the post race interview with the top three finishers, Piquet said with a smile that after his lap 80 off which allowed Mansell to close up to him that he had to "drive like hell" over the last lap and a half, and that the "shit almost hit the fan", referring to Mansell's last-ditch overtaking move which almost took both cars out. After slower times in the 1988 race, and no chance to beat it in the wet in 1989, some 9 drivers (Mansell, Piquet, Prost, Senna, Moreno, Boutsen, Alesi, Patrese and Berger himself) would go faster than Berger's 1987 record with only Berger of that group failing to go under 1:20.000.

The victory gave Piquet third place in the Drivers' Championship on countback, with the same number of points as Berger but two wins to the Austrian's none. It also secured third place in the Constructors' Championship for Benetton, equalling its best finish from 1988.

=== Race classification ===
Pos	No	Driver	Constructor	Laps	Time/Retired	Grid	Points
1	20	(Brazil) Nelson Piquet	Benetton-Ford	81	1:49:44.570	7	9
2	2	(United Kingdom) Nigel Mansell	Ferrari	81	+ 3.129	3	6
3	1	(France) Alain Prost	Ferrari	81	+ 37.259	4	4
4	28	(Austria) Gerhard Berger	McLaren-Honda	81	+ 46.862	2	3
5	5	(Belgium) Thierry Boutsen	Williams-Renault	81	+ 1:51.160	9	2
6	6	(Italy) Riccardo Patrese	Williams-Renault	80	+ 1 lap	6	1
7	19	(Brazil) Roberto Moreno	Benetton-Ford	80	+ 1 lap	8	
8	4	(France) Jean Alesi	Tyrrell-Ford	80	+ 1 lap	5	
9	23	(Italy) Pierluigi Martini	Minardi-Ford	79	+ 2 laps	10	
10	25	(Italy) Nicola Larini	Ligier-Ford	79	+ 2 laps	12	
11	26	(France) Philippe Alliot	Ligier-Ford	78	+ 3 laps	19	
12	8	(Italy) Stefano Modena	Brabham-Judd	77	+ 4 laps	17	
13	14	(France) Olivier Grouillard	Osella-Ford	74	+ 7 laps	22	
Ret	21	(Italy) Emanuele Pirro	Dallara-Ford	68	Engine	21	
Ret	27	(Brazil) Ayrton Senna	McLaren-Honda	61	Gearbox / Spun off	1	
Ret	17	(Italy) Gabriele Tarquini	AGS-Ford	58	Engine	26	
Ret	12	(United Kingdom) Johnny Herbert	Lotus-Lamborghini	57	Clutch	18	
Ret	3	(Japan) Satoru Nakajima	Tyrrell-Ford	53	Brakes	13	
Ret	16	(Italy) Ivan Capelli	Leyton House-Judd	46	Throttle	14	
Ret	11	(United Kingdom) Derek Warwick	Lotus-Lamborghini	43	Gearbox	11	
Ret	15	(Brazil) Maurício Gugelmin	Leyton House-Judd	27	Brakes	16	
Ret	22	(Italy) Andrea de Cesaris	Dallara-Ford	23	Electrical	15	
Ret	29	(France) Éric Bernard	Lola-Lamborghini	21	Gearbox	23	
Ret	24	(Italy) Gianni Morbidelli	Minardi-Ford	20	Gearbox	20	
Ret	7	(Australia) David Brabham	Brabham-Judd	18	Spun off	25	
Ret	30	(Japan) Aguri Suzuki	Lola-Lamborghini	6	Transmission	24	
DNQ	9	(Italy) Michele Alboreto	Arrows-Ford				
DNQ	18	(France) Yannick Dalmas	AGS-Ford				
DNQ	10	(Italy) Alex Caffi	Arrows-Ford				
DNQ	31	(Belgium) Bertrand Gachot	Coloni-Ford				

== Championship standings after the race ==
- **Bold text** indicates the World Champions.

Drivers' Championship standings

Pos	Driver	Points
1	(Brazil) **Ayrton Senna**	78
2	(France) Alain Prost	71 (73)
3	(Brazil) Nelson Piquet	43 (44)
4	(Austria) Gerhard Berger	43
5	(United Kingdom) Nigel Mansell	37

Constructors' Championship standings

Pos	Constructor	Points
1	(United Kingdom) **McLaren-Honda**	121
2	(Italy) Ferrari	110
3	(United Kingdom) Benetton-Ford	71
4	(United Kingdom) Williams-Renault	57
5	(United Kingdom) Tyrrell-Ford	16

- Note: Only the top five positions are included for both sets of standings.

Previous race: 1990 Japanese Grand Prix	FIA Formula One World Championship; 1990 season	Next race: 1991 United States Grand Prix
Previous race: 1989 Australian Grand Prix	Australian Grand Prix	Next race: 1991 Australian Grand Prix
Awards
Preceded by 1989 Japanese Grand Prix	Formula One Promotional Trophy for Race Promoter; 1990	Succeeded by 1991 French Grand Prix
