= Henri Julien (motor sports) =

Henri Julien (18 September 1927 – 13 July 2013) was a French racing car driver and motor sports team founder. He founded and managed the Automobiles Gonfaronnaises Sportives (AGS) racing team, which participated in the European Formula Two Championship and Formula 1 in the 1970s and 1980s.

== Biography ==
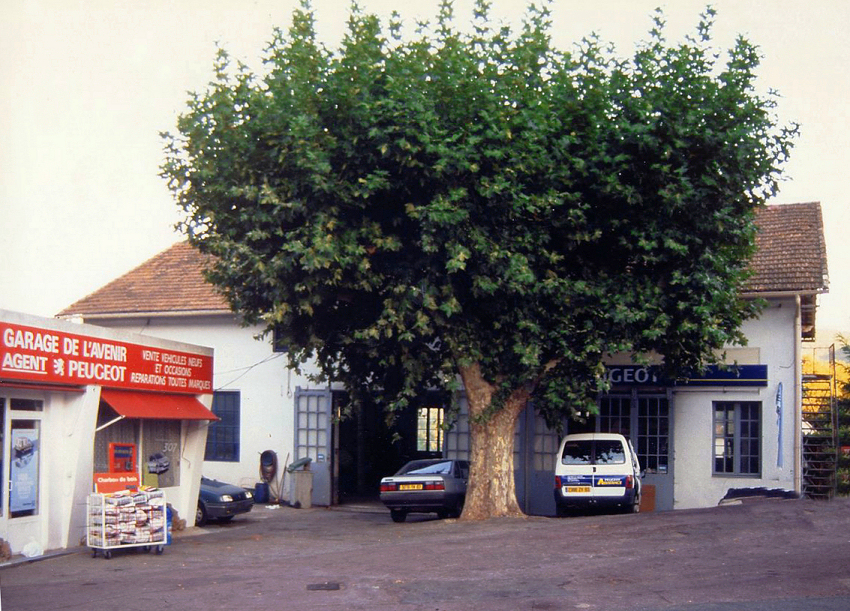
Henri Julien's Garage de l'Avenir in Gonfaron (2001)

Henri Julien's father ran a petrol station with an affiliated car garage in the Provençale village Gonfaron with the name Garage de l'Avenir ("Garage of the Future"). After his apprenticeship, which he conducted partly in Toulon, he managed the company since 1947.

During the 1946 Grand Prix season, Julien visited the Grand Prix at Nice, one of the earliest competitions after World War II, and developed an interest in motor sports.

=== Racing driver ===
In 1950, Julien designed his first single seater racing car based on Simca components for junior teams up to 500 cc and drove this competitively. A second car was built in 1952, which had a BMW engine. In 1957, he built his JH3, also known as the Julien-Panhard. This car had an 850 cc two-cylinder Panhard engine and front wheel drive as well as several Panhard production components.

At the end of the 1950s, Julien focussed on the recently established Formula Junior. He modified his cars according to the rules of this class, but participated personally only in a few races in southern France.

Julien participated in 1959 with his Julien-Panhard at the Grand Prix of Monaco Junior in Formula Junior. He qualified and finished in 19th place, after being lapped four times by the winner, Michael May, in a Stanguellini. Julien entered once again in Monte Carlo in 1960 with the slightly modified JH4 version of this car with a smaller radiator face, but he did not participate in the race for unknown reasons. Some sources say that he had not qualified, others state that he did not try at all.

In 1959, Julien ceased trying to build his own race cars. In the 1960s, he occasionally drove cars of other manufacturers in lesser classes including Formula 3.

In 1964, Julien registered a Lotus 22 with a Ford engine for a Formula 3 race in southern France. He participated in the Coupe de Vitesse at Pau but retired after 13 laps with a faulty brake system. He did not qualify for the Formula 3 Grand Prix of Monaco, where he wanted to start for the Team Écurie Méditerranée.

In 1965, Julien started once again in Formula 3. He registered an Alpine 270 with a Renault engine for the Coupe de Vitesse in Pau but did not qualify. Shortly after, at the age of 38, he retired from competing in races. However, it was reported that he continued training French drivers within the French Formula 3.

=== Motorsports team owner ===
Julien founded the company Automobiles Gonfaronnaises Sportives (AGS) (Sportscars from Gonfaron), which was located in his Garage de l'Avenir. Together with his mechanic Christian Vanderpleyn, who took an apprenticeship with Julien in 1959 and 1960, he started the production of his own racing cars. AGS initially served the smaller classes such as Formule France, Formula Renault and Formula 3, but from 1978 he participated in Formula 2 and from 1986 to 1991 in Formula 1.

AGS always maintained a works team, and participated in all series under the AGS brand. Henri Julien was team owner and coach of the racing team until 1989. Under Julien's management, the AGS team achieved three victories in seven years in Formula 2: Richard Dallest won twice in the 1980 season, and Philippe Streiff won in the 1984 season. He entered the motor sports history as the winner of the last race of Formula 2.

During the 1986 Formula One season, Julien took the opportunity to get involved in Formula 1. The French Formula 1 team Renault F1 retired at the end of the 1985 Formula One season and sold essential parts of its equipment to Julien. Julien and Christian Vanderpleyn used these parts for their first Formula 1 car, the AGS JH21C which was powered by a 1.5-litre turbocharged engine by Motori Moderni. Financial backing came from Jolly Club of Italy. The team showed up first at the 1986 Italian Grand Prix. The only driver was Ivan Capelli. AGS was the smallest Formula 1 team of the 1980s with only 6 employees including the driver, while the more established teams had more than 100 employees at that time.

In Monza, the team managed to qualify, as well as in Portugal a few weeks later, but it failed to see the chequered flag. The following year, AGS scored its first championship point when Roberto Moreno finished sixth in Australia. Two years later, Gabriele Tarquini came home sixth in Mexico. These were the only points AGS ever scored in Formula 1. Following financial problems, Julien sold his team in late 1988 to Cyril de Rouvre, a French businessman who ran the team for two more years. AGS closed in September 1991.

Julien's management style was described as goodhearted, and he was quoted as follows: "It's good to compete with others, as long as you don't forget to eat and drink well afterwards – Se battre oui, mais ne pas oublier après de bien manger et bien boire".

After selling and closing AGS, the company was restructured and reopened in 1991 Formula One season as a service provider. It offers private people the opportunity to drive a Formula One racing car on the company-owned track in Le Luc. Henri Julien was the Honorary President of this company.

In the 1990s, Julien and Bernard Boyer together developed a 500 cc racing car which achieved an average speed of 222.557 km/h at the Circuit Automobile Mortefontaine in 1997. This broke a 44-year-old track record for cars of this class.

Julien lived in the flat above the Garage de l'Avenir until he was taken ill and died in a hospital in Hyères.

== Racing cars ==
The following cars were designed and built by Julien's team including Christian Vanderpleyn and named after the team owner:

Team	Car	F1 Season	Driver	Points
Team El Charro AGS	AGS JH21C	1986	Ivan Capelli	0
Team El Charro AGS	AGS JH22	1987	Pascal Fabre; Roberto Moreno	1
Automobiles Gonfaronnaises Sportives	AGS JH23	1988	Philippe Streiff	0
Automobiles Gonfaronnaises Sportives	AGS JH23B	1989	Gabriele Tarquini; Joachim Winkelhock; Yannick Dalmas	1
	AGS JH24			
	AGS JH25			
	AGS JH26			
Automobiles Gonfaronnaises Sportives	AGS JH27	1991	Gabriele Tarquini; Olivier Grouillard; Fabrizio Barbazza	0
