= 1981 Rome Grand Prix =

Race details
- Date: 10 May 1981
- Official name: 23rd Gran Premio di Roma
- Location: Campagnano di Roma, Lazio, Italy
- Course: ACI Vallelunga Circuit
- Course length: 3.222 km (2.002 miles)
- Distance: 65 laps, 209.430 km (130.130 miles)

Pole position
Driver	(Sweden) Eje Elgh	Maurer-BMW
- Time: 1:07.79

Fastest lap
Driver	(Italy) Corrado Fabi	March-BMW
- Time: 1:09.06

Podium
First	(Sweden) Eje Elgh	Maurer-BMW
Second	(Sweden) Stefan Johansson	Lola-Hart
Third	(Belgium) Thierry Boutsen	March-BMW

The 23rd Gran Premio di Roma (Rome Grand Prix), was Round Five of the 1981 European Championship for F2 Drivers. This was held at the Autodromo Vallelunga Piero Taruffi, to the north of Rome, on 10 May.

== Report ==
=== Entry ===
A total of 32 F2 cars were entered for the event, of which 27 took part in qualifying.

=== Qualifying ===
Eje Elgh took pole position for the Maurer Motorsport, in their Maurer-BMW MM81, averaging a speed of 105.59 mph.

=== Race ===
The race was held over 65 laps of the Vallelunga circuit. Eje Elgh took the winner spoils for Maurer Motorsport outfit, driving their Maurer-BMW MM81. Elgh won in a time of 1 h 16 min 1.14 s, averaging a speed of 102.01 mph. Second place went to another Swede, Stefan Johansson in the Docking Spitzley Team Toleman’s Lola-Hart T850. The podium was completed by the work March driver, Thierry Boutsen, in his March-BMW 812.

== Classification ==
=== Race result ===
Pos.	No.	Driver	Entrant	Car - Engine	Time, Laps	Reason Out
1st	16	(Sweden) Eje Elgh	Maurer Motorsport	Maurer-BMW MM81	1hr 16:01.14	
2nd	1	(Sweden) Stefan Johansson	Docking Spitzley Team Toleman	Lola-Hart T850	1hr 16:04.42	
3rd	4	(Belgium) Thierry Boutsen	Marlboro Racing for Zolder/March Racing Ltd	March-BMW 812	1hr 16:07.74	
4th	3	(Italy) Corrado Fabi	Roloil Marlboro Racing/March Racing Ltd	March-BMW 812	1hr 16:13.19	
5th	14	(United Kingdom) Geoff Lees	Ralt Racing Ltd	Ralt-Honda RH6/81	1hr 16:24.13	
6th	7	(Italy) Riccardo Paletti	March Onyx Racing Team	March-BMW 812	1hr 16:53.09	
7th	11	(Italy) Guido Pardini	Sanremo Racing Srl	Lola-BMW T850	1hr 17:00.76	
8th	12	(Italy) Carlo Rossi	Sanremo Racing Srl	Toleman-Hart TG280	64	
9th	77	(United Kingdom) Jim Crawford	Plygrange Racing Ltd	Toleman-Hart TG280	63	
10th	2	(United Kingdom) Kenny Acheson	Docking Spitzley Team Toleman	Lola-Hart T850	63	
11th	27	(Austria) Sewi Hopfer	Sewi Hopfer Racing	Toleman-Hart TG280	63	
12th	28	(Italy) Guido Daccò	DAC Sport Racing Team	Minardi-BMW GM75	62	
DNF	40	(United Kingdom) Paul Smith	BMTR	March-Hart 802	52	Out of fuel/Gearbox
DNF	18	(Switzerland) Freddy Schnarwiler	Formel Rennsport Club	Lola- BMW T850	39	Fuel Pump
DNF	17	(Colombia) Roberto Guerrero	Maurer Motorsport	Maurer-BMW MM81	38	Gearbox
DNF	9	(Venezuela) Johnny Cecotto	Minardi Team	Minardi Fly-BMW 281	21	Fuel Blockage
DNF	19	(Italy) Piero Necchi	Astra Team Merzario Srl	March-BMW 812	10	Collision
DNF	10	(Italy) Michele Alboreto	Minardi Team	Minardi Fly-BMW 281	10	Collision
DNF	8	(France) Richard Dallest	Team AGS Motul GPA	AGS-BMW JH18	7	Engine
DNF	38	(West Germany) Harald Brutschin	Weigel Renntecknik WRT	March-BMW 802	2	Collision
DNF	24	(Switzerland) Jürg Lienhard	Lista Racing Team	March-BMW 802	2	Collision
DNF	5	(West Germany) Christian Danner	March Racing Team	March-BMW 812	0	Suspension / Spin
DNQ	20	(Italy) "Gianfranco"	Astra Team Merzario Srl	March-BMW 812		
DNQ	21	(Italy) Marco Brand	Astra Team Merzario Srl	March-BMW 812		
DNQ	34	(Italy) Oscar Pedersoli	Bertram Schäfer Racing	Ralt-BMW RT2		
DNQ	39	(West Germany) Bernd Brutschin	Weigel Renntecknik WRT	March-BMW 802		
DNQ	56	(Italy) Piero Nappi	Scuderia Vesuvio Flammini	Ralt-Hart RT2		

- Fastest lap: Corrado Fabi, 1 min 9.06 s. (103.651 mph)
