= AGS JH24 =

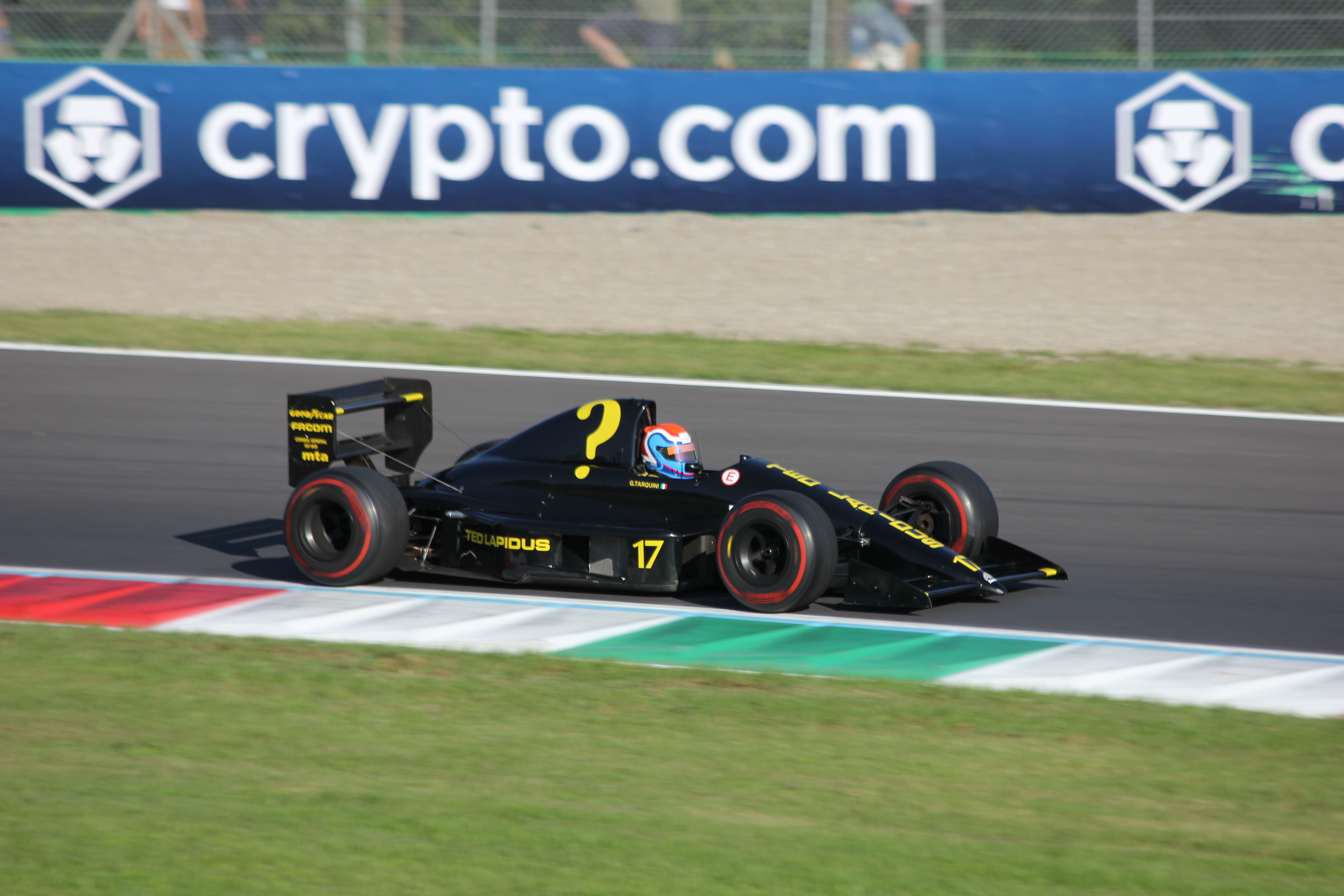
- The JH24 on track during the 2025 Italian Grand Prix weekend
- Category: Formula One
- Constructor: AGS
- Designer: Claude Galopin (Chief Engineer)
- Predecessor: AGS JH23
- Successor: AGS JH25

Technical specifications
- Chassis: Carbon fibre monocoque
- Length: 4,350 millimetres (171 in)
- Width: 2,098 millimetres (82.6 in)
- Height: 1,080 millimetres (43 in)
- Axle track: Front: 1,803 mm (71.0 in); Rear: 1,695 mm (66.7 in)
- Wheelbase: 2,794 mm (110.0 in)
- Engine: Ford Cosworth DFR 3,493 cc (213.2 cu in), V8, mid-engine, longitudinally, mid-mounted, NA.
- Power: 650 brake horsepower (660 PS; 480 kW) @ 11,250 rpm 562 newton-metres (415 lbf⋅ft) @ 7,400 rpm
- Weight: 523–549 kilograms (1,153–1,210 lb)
- Fuel: Elf
- Lubricants: Elf
- Tyres: Goodyear

Competition history
- Notable entrants: AGS
- Notable drivers: (Italy) Gabriele Tarquini (France) Yannick Dalmas
- Debut: 1989 British Grand Prix
Races	Wins	Poles	F/Laps
10	0	0	0

The JH24 was a Formula One car built and raced by the AGS team for the 1989 Formula One season. It was powered by the Ford Cosworth DFR engine. The car only managed to qualify for one race. The cars were driven by Gabriele Tarquini and Yannick Dalmas, who replaced Joachim Winkelhock in the middle of the 1989 season.

== Race history ==
=== 1989 ===
The car was built to replace the JH23, but in its debut in the British Grand Prix, it failed to qualify. At first, the JH24 was only used by Tarquini until the Belgian Grand Prix, where a chassis was also available for Dalmas. In the second half of the season, the team had to prequalify - a task that was nearly never achieved by either Tarquini or Dalmas. AGS then finished 15th in the Constructors' Championship, equal with the Lolas used by the Larrousse team.

=== 1990 ===
A revised version of the car was entered in the first two races of the season. The car, being entered without a "B" suffix, ran with a revised suspension and enabled Dalmas to qualify for the 1990 Brazilian Grand Prix in last place, with a 3.8-second gap from the pole lap set by Ayrton Senna. Dalmas then retired on lap 28 with a suspension problem. The car was then replaced by the JH25.

== Complete Formula One results ==
(key) (results in bold indicate pole position)

Year	Chassis	Engine	Tyres	Drivers	1	2	3	4	5	6	7	8	9	10	11	12	13	14	15	16	Points	WCC
1989	JH24	Cosworth DFR; V8	G		BRA	SMR	MON	MEX	USA	CAN	FRA	GBR	GER	HUN	BEL	ITA	POR	ESP	JPN	AUS	1	15th
1989	JH24	Cosworth DFR; V8	G	Gabriele Tarquini								DNQ		DNPQ	DNPQ	DNPQ	DNPQ	DNPQ	DNPQ	DNPQ	1	15th
1989	JH24	Cosworth DFR; V8	G	Yannick Dalmas											DNPQ	DNPQ	DNPQ	DNPQ	DNPQ	DNPQ	1	15th
1990	JH24	Cosworth DFR; V8	G		USA	BRA	SMR	MON	CAN	MEX	FRA	GBR	GER	HUN	BEL	ITA	POR	ESP	JPN	AUS	0	NC
1990	JH24	Cosworth DFR; V8	G	Gabriele Tarquini	DNPQ	DNPQ															0	NC
1990	JH24	Cosworth DFR; V8	G	Yannick Dalmas	DNPQ	Ret	DNPQ														0	NC
