= AGS JH23 =

AGS JH23 AGS JH23B
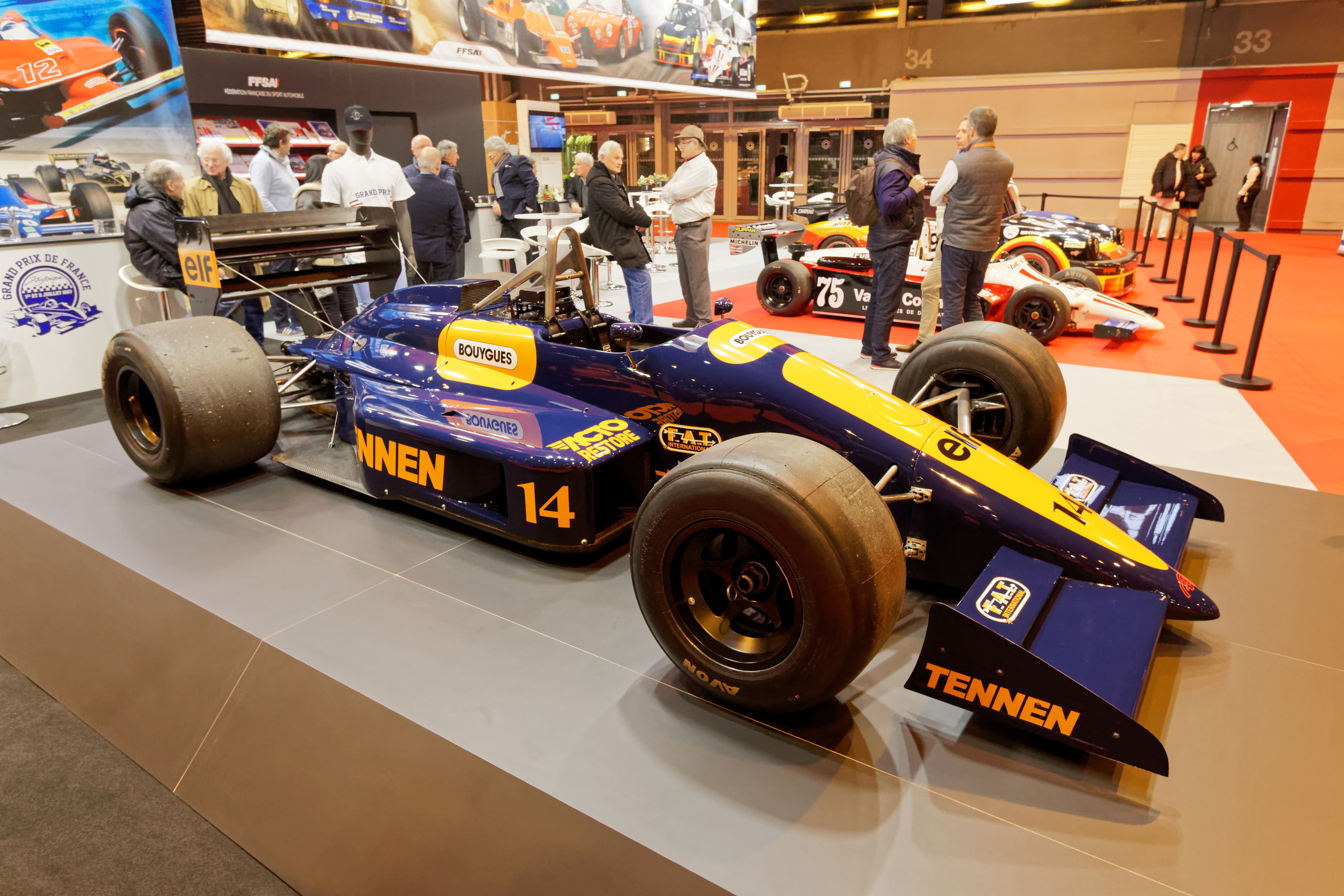
- Category: Formula One
- Constructor: AGS
- Designers: Christian Vanderpleyn (Technical Director); Michel Costa (Chief Designer)
- Predecessor: AGS JH22
- Successor: AGS JH24

Technical specifications
- Chassis: Carbon fibre monocoque
- Length: 4,280 millimetres (169 in)
- Width: 2,134 millimetres (84.0 in)
- Height: 999 millimetres (39.3 in)
- Axle track: 1,710 millimetres (67 in) (Front); 1,640 millimetres (65 in) (Rear)
- Wheelbase: 2,680 millimetres (106 in)
- Engine: 1988: Ford Cosworth DFZ, 3,494 cc (213.2 cu in), naturally aspirated 90° V8. Longitudinal, mid-mounted. 1989: Ford Cosworth DFR 3,493 cc (213.2 cu in), V8, mid-engine, longitudinally, mid-mounted, NA.
- Transmission: Hewland 6-speed Manual
- Power: JH23A: 580 brake horsepower (590 PS; 430 kW) @ 10,500 rpm 434 newton-metres (320 lbf⋅ft) @ 8,000 rpm JH23B: 630 brake horsepower (640 PS; 470 kW) @ 11,250 rpm 542 newton-metres (400 lbf⋅ft) @ 8,000 rpm
- Weight: 515–510 kilograms (1,135–1,124 lb)
- Fuel: Elf
- Lubricants: Elf
- Tyres: Goodyear

Competition history
- Notable entrants: AGS
- Notable drivers: (France) Philippe Streiff (Italy) Gabriele Tarquini (Germany) Joachim Winkelhock (France) Yannick Dalmas
- Debut: 1988 Brazilian Grand Prix
Races	Poles	F/Laps
22	0	0

The JH23 was a Formula One car built and raced by the AGS team for the 1988 Formula One season. It was powered by the Ford Cosworth DFZ engine. A single car was entered, driven by experienced Frenchman Philippe Streiff.

== 1988 ==
The JH23 proved to be a good car for the small French team, in only their second full season in Formula One. The car managed to qualify for all 16 races including 12th at Monaco, and 10th in Canada where before retiring with suspension failure on lap 41, it was only the power of the Honda V6 turbo in Nelson Piquet's ill-handling Lotus 100T that kept Streiff from passing the reigning World Champion for 4th place. However whenever it got close to scoring points, the car broke down. Streiff only managed to finish 6 races, the best result being 8th at Suzuka.

== 1989 ==
The car was updated with a Ford Cosworth DFR engine for the 1989 season, to become the JH23B and for the first time the team entered two cars.

The drivers were Phillipe Streiff and the rookie German Joachim Winkelhock. The season got off to a tragic start as Streiff was seriously injured in a pre-season testing crash at the Jacarepaguá circuit in Brazil. This left him paralysed and thus using a wheelchair.

Italian Gabriele Tarquini took over from Streiff and had a good season, the highlight being a 6th place in Mexico. However his teammate Winkelhock and later on Yannick Dalmas failed to get past pre-qualifying.

By Spa the car was replaced by the JH24.

== After Formula One ==
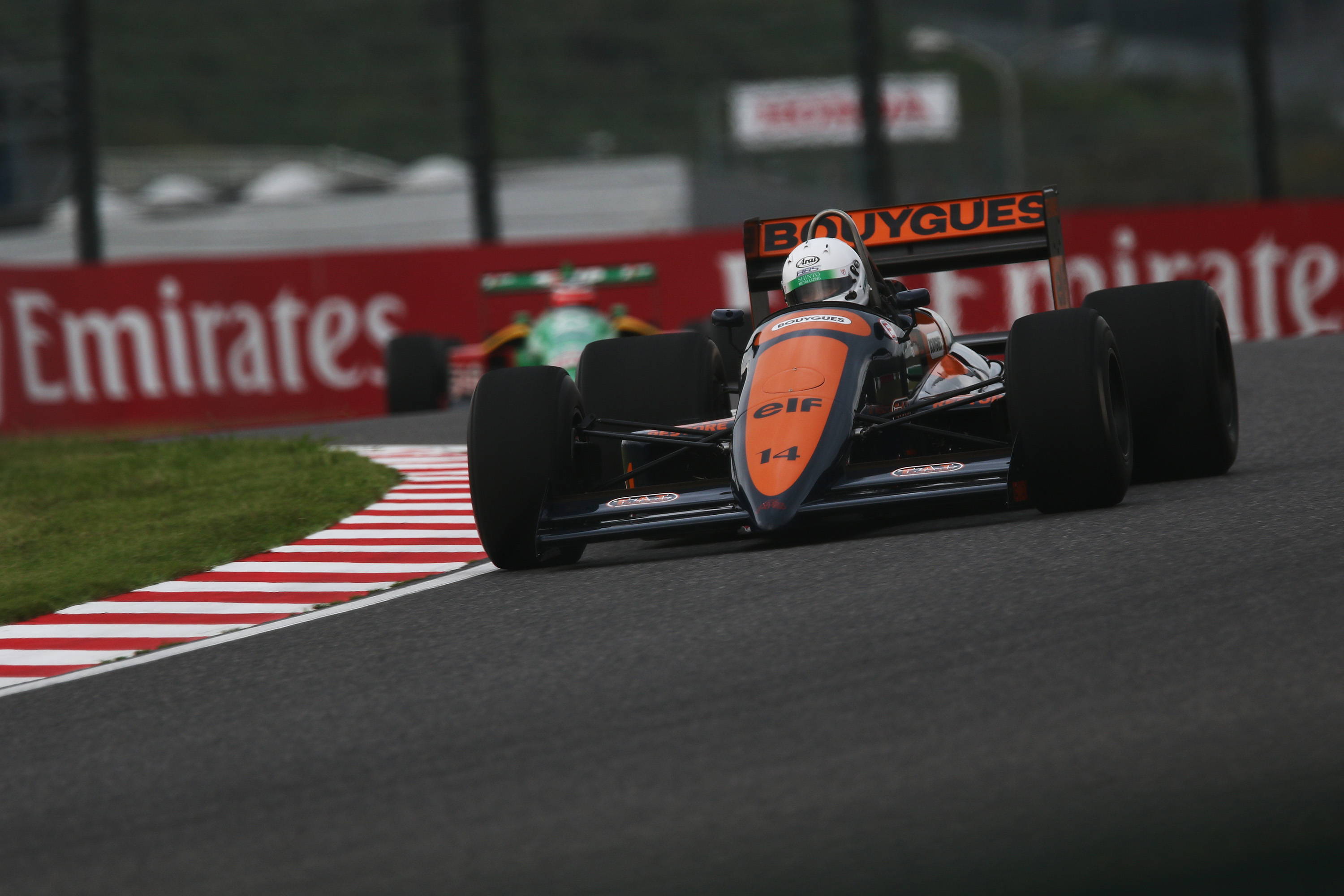
The AGS JH23 being demonstrated at the 2018 Japanese Grand Prix.

Three JH23 chassis were built, two are still owned by AGS and the other is on display at the Lohéac Automobile Museum. A JH23 chassis would take part in the Legends F1 30th Anniversary Lap, a demonstration event held during the 2018 Japanese Grand Prix to celebrate the 30th Japanese Grand Prix held at Suzuka.

== Complete Formula One results ==
(key) (results in bold indicate pole position)

Year	Chassis	Engine	Tyres	Drivers	1	2	3	4	5	6	7	8	9	10	11	12	13	14	15	16	Points	WCC
1988	JH23	Cosworth DFZ; V8	G		BRA	SMR	MON	MEX	CAN	DET	FRA	GBR	GER	HUN	BEL	ITA	POR	ESP	JPN	AUS	0	NC
1988	JH23	Cosworth DFZ; V8	G	Philippe Streiff	Ret	10	Ret	12	Ret	Ret	Ret	Ret	Ret	Ret	10	Ret	9	Ret	8	11	0	NC
1989	JH23B	Cosworth DFR; V8	G		BRA	SMR	MON	MEX	USA	CAN	FRA	GBR	GER	HUN	BEL	ITA	POR	ESP	JPN	AUS	1	15th
1989	JH23B	Cosworth DFR; V8	G	Philippe Streiff	WD																1	15th
1989	JH23B	Cosworth DFR; V8	G	Gabriele Tarquini		8	Ret	6	7	Ret	Ret		DNPQ								1	15th
1989	JH23B	Cosworth DFR; V8	G	Joachim Winkelhock	DNPQ	DNPQ	DNPQ	DNPQ	DNPQ	DNPQ	DNPQ										1	15th
1989	JH23B	Cosworth DFR; V8	G	Yannick Dalmas								DNPQ	DNPQ	DNPQ							1	15th
