= AGS JH15 =

French Formula 2 car

The AGS JH15 was an open-wheel race car intended for Formula Two, designed, developed, and built by French racing team and constructor AGS, in 1978. The car ran and competed in individual Formula Three motor races for four years, until 1981. It was also the team's first Formula Two race car chassis, after a long period of building Formula Three cars for junior categories.

== Design ==
The JH15 was a monocoque chassis racing car, unassuming and conventional in appearance. The designer was Christian Vanderpleyn. A BMW M12 four-cylinder engine was used, with a Hewland gearbox. AGS produced two models of the JH15, with chassis numbers 021 and 022.

== Racing history ==
=== Formula 2 European Championship ===
The car made its racing debut at the Easter race at Thruxton. Frenchman Richard Dallest was behind the wheel, and although he brought the car to the finish line, he was not classified. The JH15 was a cumbersome and above all slow car. Dallest and AGS second driver, José Dolhem, struggled with the car all season. The financial resources of AGS were limited, and further development of the vehicle through test drives was only possible to a limited extent. Therefore, the successes remained almost unpredictable. The best finish for the JH15 remained Dallest's eleventh-place finish at the Grand Prix di Nogaro. The JH15 remained as a replacement car until 1981. The JH15 contested its last Formula 2 race in July 1981 at Gran Premio del Mediterraneo in Enna, Sicily. Richard Dallest was eighth here.

=== Aurora AFX Formula 1 Series (British Formula One) ===
In 1979, the JH15 made an appearance at an Aurora AFX Formula One Series race. The AGS works team entered the car in July 1979 under the designation Motul Nogaro for Alain Couderc for the Nogaro Grand Prix at the Circuit Paul Armagnac. Couderc qualified for the race and held out for 42 laps against strong competition, most of whom were equipped with Cosworth DFV eight-cylinder engines. Then the clutch broke, a defect repeated at AGS during the 1979 season. Couderc had to end the race prematurely. It was the AGS team's first exposure to Formula 1 and the only attempt by an AGS driver in the Aurora Series.
