= 1981 European Formula Two Championship =

1981 European Formula Two season

Seasons
- ← 1980 1982 →

The 1981 European Formula Two season was the fifteenth European Formula Two season and was contested over 12 rounds. The season started on 19 March and ended on 20 September. The Drivers' Championship was won by Englishman Geoff Lees.

== Season review ==
Rnd	Race	Track	Date	Laps	Distance	Time	Speed	Pole position	Fastest lap	Race winner	Constructor
Rd.1	(United Kingdom) BRDC International Trophy	Silverstone	29 March	47	221.793 km	1'11:44.76	185.482 km/h	(New Zealand) Mike Thackwell	(United Kingdom) Geoff Lees	(New Zealand) Mike Thackwell	Ralt-Honda
Rd.2	(Germany) Jim Clark Gedächtnisrennen	Hockenheim	5 April	30	203.67 km	1'00:28.05	202.095 km/h	(United Kingdom) Geoff Lees	(Italy) Riccardo Paletti	(Sweden) Stefan Johansson	Lola-Hart
Rd.3	(United Kingdom) Jochen Rindt Memorial Trophy	Thruxton	20 April	55	208.560 km	1'04:02.40	195.403 km/h	(Belgium) Thierry Boutsen	(Switzerland) Marc Surer	(Colombia) Roberto Guerrero	Maurer-BMW
Rd.4	(Germany) Internationales ADAC-Eifelrennen	Nürburgring	26 April	9	205,515 km	1'05:04.63	189.481 km/h	(Italy) Corrado Fabi	(Belgium) Thierry Boutsen	(Belgium) Thierry Boutsen	March-BMW
Rd.5	(Italy) Gran Premio di Roma	Vallelunga	10 May	65	208.0 km	1'16:01.14	164.169 km/h	(Sweden) Eje Elgh	(Italy) Corrado Fabi	(Sweden) Eje Elgh	Maurer-BMW
Rd.6	(Italy) Gran Premio di Mugello	Mugello	24 May	42	220.290 km	1'15:20.99	175.414 km/h	(Belgium) Thierry Boutsen	(Italy) Piero Necchi	(Italy) Corrado Fabi	March-BMW
Rd.7	(France) Grand Prix Automobile de Pau	Pau	8 June	73	201.48 km	1'33:13.91	129.664 km/h	(Italy) Michele Alboreto	(United Kingdom) Geoff Lees	(United Kingdom) Geoff Lees	Ralt-Honda
Rd.8	(Italy) Gran Premio del Mediterraneo	Pergusa-Enna	26 July	45	222.75 km	1'10:09.82	190.483 km/h	(Belgium) Thierry Boutsen	(Belgium) Thierry Boutsen	(Belgium) Thierry Boutsen	March-BMW
Rd.9	(Belgium) Grand Prix de Formule 2 Belgique	Spa-Francorchamps	9 August	30	209.01 km	1'10:02.68	179.037 km/h	(Belgium) Thierry Boutsen	(United Kingdom) Geoff Lees	(United Kingdom) Geoff Lees	Ralt-Honda
Rd.10	(United Kingdom) Donington "50 000"	Donington Park	16 August	70	220.20 km	1'16:49.82	171.963 km/h	(Germany) Manfred Winkelhock	(United Kingdom) Geoff Lees (Italy) Corrado Fabi	(United Kingdom) Geoff Lees	Ralt-Honda
Rd.11	(Italy) Gran Premio dell'Adriatico	Misano	6 September	60	209.28 km	1'12:03.74	174.249 km/h	(Belgium) Thierry Boutsen	(Italy) Michele Alboreto (United Kingdom) Geoff Lees	(Italy) Michele Alboreto	Minardi-BMW
Rd.12	(Sweden) Mantorp Park – F2 Trofén	Mantorp Park	20 September	65	203.125 km	1'20:08.0	152.090 km/h	(Italy) Corrado Fabi	(Venezuela) Johnny Cecotto	(Sweden) Stefan Johansson	Lola-Hart

== Drivers' Championship ==
Pos	Driver	Car(s)	SIL (United Kingdom)	HOC (West Germany)	THR (United Kingdom)	NÜR (West Germany)	VAL (Italy)	MUG (Italy)	PAU (France)	PER (Italy)	SPA (Belgium)	DON (United Kingdom)	MIS (Italy)	MAN (Sweden)	Pts
1	(United Kingdom) Geoff Lees	Ralt RH6/81-Honda	7	5	NC	5	5	2	1	Ret	1	1	2	2	51
2	(Belgium) Thierry Boutsen	March 812-BMW	Ret	Ret	Ret	1	3	Ret	2	1	2	12	8	4	37
3	(Sweden) Eje Elgh	Maurer MM81-BMW	18	4	2	2	1	4	5	5	3	7	Ret	17	35
4	(Sweden) Stefan Johansson	Lola T850-Hart	9	1	7	4	2	Ret	8	Ret	14	4	9	1	30
5	(Italy) Corrado Fabi	March 812-BMW	3	Ret	Ret	3	4	1	Ret	Ret	4	2	Ret	7	29
6	(New Zealand) Mike Thackwell	Ralt RH6/81-Honda	1	3				5	6	DSQ	Ret	5	3	15	22
7	(Colombia) Roberto Guerrero	Maurer MM81-BMW	Ret	10	1	Ret	Ret	6	Ret	4	Ret	Ret	4	Ret	16
8	(Italy) Michele Alboreto	Minardi Fly 281-BMW	11	8	Ret	8	Ret	14	Ret	3	8		1		13
9	(Germany) Manfred Winkelhock	Ralt RT2-BMW		2	Ret	DSQ									12
9	(Germany) Manfred Winkelhock	Maurer MM81-BMW									5	3			12
10	(Italy) Riccardo Paletti	March 812-BMW	2	Ret	3	Ret	6	10	Ret	Ret	15	Ret	Ret	Ret	11
11	(Italy) Piero Necchi	March 812-BMW	DNS	DNS	6	Ret	Ret	3	3	11	7	Ret			9
12	(Netherlands) Huub Rothengatter	March 802-BMW								2	13	8	11	Ret	6
13	(Italy) Carlo Rossi	Toleman TG280-Hart	5	6	Ret	Ret	8	8	4	Ret	Ret	Ret	10		6
14	(Venezuela) Johnny Cecotto	Minardi Fly 281-BMW	14	Ret	4	DNS	Ret								6
14	(Venezuela) Johnny Cecotto	March 812-BMW						13	7	Ret	Ret	6	6	6	6
15	(United Kingdom) Kenny Acheson	Lola T850-Hart	19	Ret	Ret	6	10	15	Ret					3	5
16	(United Kingdom) Jim Crawford	Toleman TG280-Hart	4	7	Ret	Ret	9	11	10		6	9	7	10	4
17	(France) Richard Dallest	AGS JH17-BMW	Ret	Ret	Ret										4
17	(France) Richard Dallest	AGS JH18-BMW					Ret	7	Ret				5	5	4
17	(France) Richard Dallest	AGS JH15-BMW								9					4
18	(Germany) Christian Danner	March 812-BMW	10	9	5	10	Ret	16	Ret	Ret	Ret	14	Ret	11	2
19	(Austria) Jo Gartner	Toleman TG280-BMW				7		9		6	Ret	Ret			1
19	(Austria) Jo Gartner	March 812-BMW											DNQ	8	1
20	(United Kingdom) Brian Robinson	Chevron B42-Hart	6		DNS										1
20	(United Kingdom) Brian Robinson	Chevron B48-Hart										DNQ			1
—	(Italy) Guido Pardini	Lola T850-BMW	Ret	Ret	Ret	9	7	12	DNS	Ret	Ret	13	Ret		0
—	(Switzerland) Fredy Schnarwiler	Lola T850-BMW	15	12	9		Ret	Ret		7	Ret	16			0
—	(United Kingdom) Ray Mallock	Ralt RT4-Hart	8						DNQ		9	Ret			0
—	(United Kingdom) Paul Smith	March 782-Hart	Ret												0
—	(United Kingdom) Paul Smith	March 802-Hart			10		Ret	19	DNQ	8	10	17	DNQ	14	0
—	(Germany) Harald Brutschin	March 802-BMW		Ret	8	Ret	Ret		DNQ		16				0
—	(Colombia) Ricardo Londoño	Toleman TG280-Hart							9		Ret	DNS			0
—	(Colombia) Ricardo Londoño	Lola T850-Hart								Ret					0
—	(Sweden) Anders Olofsson	March 792-Hart											Ret	9	0
—	(Italy) Roberto Del Castello	March 782-BMW						18		10			Ret		0
—	(Italy) Paolo Barilla	Minardi Fly 281-Ferrari								Ret					0
—	(Italy) Paolo Barilla	Minardi Fly 281-BMW										10			0
—	(Italy) Guido Daccò	Minardi GM75-BMW	17	11		Ret	12	20			17	Ret	DNQ	12	0
—	(Italy) Guido Daccò	Merzario M1-BMW								Ret					0
—	(Austria) Sewi Hopfer	Toleman TG280-Hart	13	13	Ret	14	11	Ret			11	Ret	DNQ		0
—	(United Kingdom) Warren Booth	Chevron B48-Hart	16		11										0
—	(Austria) Franz Konrad	March 802-BMW				11									0
—	(United Kingdom) Tiff Needell	AGS JH18-BMW										11			0
—	(Italy) Gianfranco Trombetti	March 812-BMW	20	Ret	Ret		DNQ	Ret	Ret	12	12		12	13	0
—	(Switzerland) Jürg Lienhard	March 802-BMW	12	Ret		Ret	Ret	17	DNPQ						0
—	(Switzerland) Loris Kessel	March 812-BMW				12		Ret				19			0
—	(Switzerland) Loris Kessel	Merzario M1-BMW							DNPQ						0
—	(Switzerland) Loris Kessel	March 802-BMW								Ret					0
—	(Switzerland) Marc Surer	March 812-BMW		Ret	12										0
—	(Germany) Bernd Brutschin	March 802-BMW				13	DNQ		DNQ						0
—	(Argentina) Miguel Ángel Guerra	Minardi Fly 281-Ferrari											13		0
—	(Japan) Keiji Matsumoto	March 802B-BMW										15			0
—	(Austria) Pierre Chauvet	Toleman TG280-BMW												16	0
—	(United Kingdom) Kim Mather	March 792-Hart	Ret									18			0
—	(Sweden) Stanley Dickens	March 802-BMW												18	0
—	(Italy) Oscar Pedersoli	Ralt RT2-BMW					DNQ	Ret	Ret				Ret		0
—	(Italy) Arturo Merzario	Merzario M1-BMW	DNQ		DNS									Ret	0
—	(Italy) Arturo Merzario	March 812-BMW				Ret									0
—	(France) Patrick Gaillard	AGS JH17-BMW				Ret									0
—	(France) Patrick Gaillard	March 802-BMW									Ret				0
—	(Germany) Jochen Dauer	GRS TC 001-BMW	DNS	Ret											0
—	(Denmark) John Nielsen	March 792-BMW				Ret					DNS				0
—	(Italy) Piero Nappi	Ralt RT2-BMW					DNQ	Ret							0
—	(Italy) Marco Brand	Merzario M1-BMW					DNQ				Ret				0
—	(Germany) Helmut Kallenborn	March 752-BMW				Ret									0
—	(Belgium) Hervé Regout	Ralt RT2-BMW									Ret				0
—	(Italy) Roberto Farnetti	Minardi Fly 281-BMW											Ret		0
—	(United Kingdom) Roy Baker	Chevron B48-Hart	DNQ												0
—	(United Kingdom) Roy Baker	March 802-Hart			DNS			DNQ	DNPQ		DNQ	DNQ			0
—	(United Kingdom) Bob Howlings	Chevron B42-Hart	DNQ												0
Pos	Driver	Car(s)	SIL (United Kingdom)	HOC (West Germany)	THR (United Kingdom)	NÜR (West Germany)	VAL (Italy)	MUG (Italy)	PAU (France)	PER (Italy)	SPA (Belgium)	DON (United Kingdom)	MIS (Italy)	MAN (Sweden)	Pts

Colour	Result
Gold	Winner
Silver	Second place
Bronze	Third place
Green	Points classification
Blue	Non-points classification
Blue	Non-classified finish (NC)
Purple	Retired, not classified (Ret)
Red	Did not qualify (DNQ)
Red	Did not pre-qualify (DNPQ)
Black	Disqualified (DSQ)
White	Did not start (DNS)
White	Withdrew (WD)
White	Race cancelled (C)
Blank	Did not practice (DNP)
Blank	Did not arrive (DNA)
Blank	Excluded (EX)
