= Cyril Bourlon de Rouvre =

French businessman and politician (born 1945)

- Born: Bourlon de Rouvre; 19 December 1945 (age 80); Boulogne-Billancourt, France
- Citizenship: French
- Education: Aerospace engineer
- Alma mater: Lycée Janson-de-Sailly; Institut polytechnique des sciences avancées
- Occupations: Businessman and politician
- Known for: Team principal Ligier

Cyril Hubert Marie Bourlon de Rouvre (born 19 December 1945, Boulogne-Billancourt) is a French businessman and politician, and former Formula 1 team owner.

== Education and early career ==
Cyril Bourlon de Rouvre was born to industrialist Évrard Bourlon de Rouvre and his wife Claude Genty. Through his paternal great-grandfather, Charles Bourlon de Rouvre (1850–1924), Cyril was to inherit lucrative sugar refineries and land. Jacques Lebaudy was related to Charles by marriage through Gustave Lebaudy, Charles' father-in-law.

De Rouvre studied at Collège Maspero in Paris; the École Saint-Martin de France in Pontoise; the Oratory School in Reading, England; the Collège Saint-Jean in Fribourg; and the Lycée Janson-de-Sailly in Paris. He then studied electrical engineering at Sorbonne University's Jussieu Campus and aerospace engineering at the Institut polytechnique des sciences avancées.

After finishing university, he worked at Électricité de France before serving his conscription. He then worked as a technical sales engineer at Elliot Automation (1966–1968); Director of Export at Sucre Union company (1971–1973); sales director (1973) and audiovisual sales agent (1974–1975) at Lara audiovisuel; and associate director at Auto Racing (1977).

== Career ==
After his father's murder in 1979, de Rouvre inherited sizable real estate holdings, a sugar refinery, and 28 companies. In 1981, he took control of the holding company Fraissinet, which owned the business airline Transair. He served as CEO of Financière Robur et de Cofragec from 1982 to 1992, and of Coficine from 1984 to 1992. He also modernized the refinery. In 1987, he started a new career in film distribution by acquiring, from the producer Robert Dorfmann, the company Cofragec, which had a catalog of more than 650 films, including La Grande Vadrouille and La Vache et le Prisonnier. He produced movies including Nicolas Klotz's La Nuit bengali (1988), Philippe Le Guay's Les Deux Fragonard (1989), and Luis Puenzo's La Peste (1992). He also invested in real estate, including a hotel in Tahiti. In his free time, he rallied with fellow car enthusiast Thierry Sabine.

In 1989, he started a political career in Haute-Marne, a department where his grandfather was an MP during the Third Republic. He was elected mayor of Chaumont as an independent (classified as miscellaneous right), defeating centrist senator and incumbent mayor Georges Berchet, and later regional councillor for Champagne-Ardenne (1992–1998). He hired a 25-year-old Luc Chatel to his team as a municipal councillor.

Between March 1989 and 1991, he owned the Formula 1 team AGS, investing $18 million. He then began selling some of his companies, including Transair and the refinery to Compagnie de navigation mixte, and, in 1991, AGS to Gabriele Rafanelli and Patrizio Cantu. In 1992, he merged Cofragec's movie catalog with UGC. The same year, he purchased the Formula 1 team Ligier for an estimated 200 million francs. The team, which had experienced a slump in recent years, had a successful season in 1993, finishing in 5th place at the Constructors' Championships, the team's best result since 1986. De Rouvre was forced to sell the team to Flavio Briatore in early 1994 due to his legal problems. In 1995, he lost his reelection campaign as mayor of Chaumont.

== Legal issues ==
On 5 May 1993, following the June 1992 acquisition of Cofragec, the directors from UGC filed a complaint for fraud against de Rouvre. The company had reportedly been stripped of its assets, leaving liabilities estimated at 172.6 million francs. De Rouvre had promised to repay this sum by the end of 1992, but still owed 100 million at that time. He was incarcerated by Judge Eva Joly at the Fleury-Mérogis Prison on 14 December 1993 and spent two months in prison.

In 1996, the Tribunal de grande instance of Chaumont opened a judicial investigation against de Rouvre. In September 1999, he appeared in Chaumont's Criminal Court for alleged tax evasion. Though the public prosecutor requested a sentence of three years imprisonment and a 20-year ban on company management, he was given a suspended sentence of 18 months imprisonment, a ban from managing a company for three years, and a large fine.

== Bibliography ==
- Who's Who in France, 2002–2003, Levallois-Perret, Jacques Lafitte Editions, 2002, p. 1648
