= AGS JH21C =

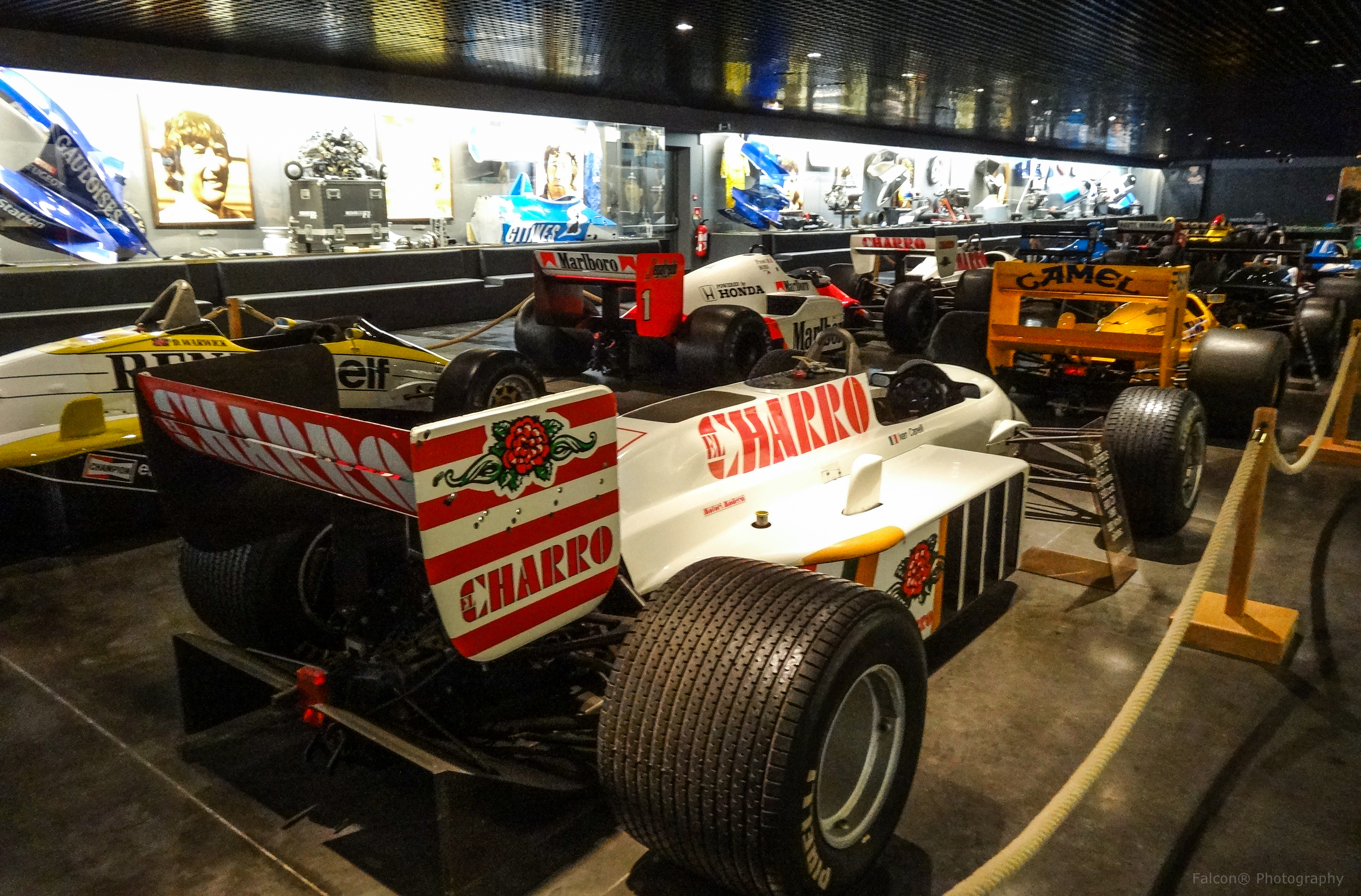
- AGS JH21C rear
- Category: Formula One
- Designers: Christian Vanderpleyn (Technical Director); Michel Costa (Chief Designer)
- Successor: AGS JH22

Technical specifications
- Chassis: Carbon fibre monocoque
- Suspension: Pull-rod
- Suspension (front): Double wishbones
- Suspension (rear): Double wishbones
- Length: 4,303 millimetres (169.4 in)
- Width: 2,099 millimetres (82.6 in)
- Height: 935 millimetres (36.8 in)
- Axle track: Front: 1,810 millimetres (71 in); Rear: 1,654 millimetres (65.1 in)
- Wheelbase: 2,830 millimetres (111 in)
- Engine: Motori Moderni 615-90 1,499 cubic centimetres (91.5 cu in) V6 single turbo longitudinally mid mounted
- Transmission: Renault / Hewland 5 or 6 Speed Manual
- Power: 780 horsepower (580 kW) @ 15,500 rpm 710 newton-metres (520 lb⋅ft) @ 7,200 rpm
- Weight: 560 kilograms (1,230 lb)
- Tires: Pirelli

Competition history
- Notable entrants: Jolly Club
- Notable drivers: (Italy) Ivan Capelli
- Debut: 1986 Italian Grand Prix
- Last event: 1986 Portuguese Grand Prix
Entries	Races	Wins	Podiums
2	2	0	0
Poles	F/Laps	Titles	
0	0	0	

The AGS JH21C was the first Formula One car used by the French AGS team. It was designed by Christian Vanderpleyn and Michel Costa and entered into two races of the 1986 Formula One season, in Italy and Portugal, driven by Italian Ivan Capelli.

The single JH21C was built around a 1983 Renault RE40 monocoque that had been acquired by team owner Henri Julien. Its chassis number was 031. It was fitted with a Motori Moderni V6 turbocharged engine and Pirelli tyres, and painted in the white livery of the team's main sponsor El Charro, an Italian fashion company.

Before the car made its Grand Prix debut, it was tested at Paul Ricard by Didier Pironi, driving an F1 car for the first time since his leg-breaking crash at Hockenheim in 1982. However, Pironi saw this test as a one-off and thus did not compete for the race seat with Capelli.

In both races the car was entered into, Capelli qualified 25th and retired - suffering a puncture at Monza after 31 laps, and a gearbox failure at Estoril after six laps.

For AGS's first full F1 season in 1987, the JH21C was replaced by the JH22.

The car is now on display at the Manoir de l'Automobile in the commune of Lohéac, Brittany.

== Complete Formula One results ==
(key)

Year	Entrant	Engine	Tyres	Drivers	1	2	3	4	5	6	7	8	9	10	11	12	13	14	15	16	Points	WCC
1986	Jolly Club SpA	Motori Moderni V6 (t/c)	P		BRA	ESP	SMR	MON	BEL	CAN	DET	FRA	GBR	GER	HUN	AUT	ITA	POR	MEX	AUS	0	NC
1986	Jolly Club SpA	Motori Moderni V6 (t/c)	P	(Italy) Ivan Capelli													Ret	Ret			0	NC
