= Automobiles Gonfaronnaises Sportives =

French race car maker

AGS
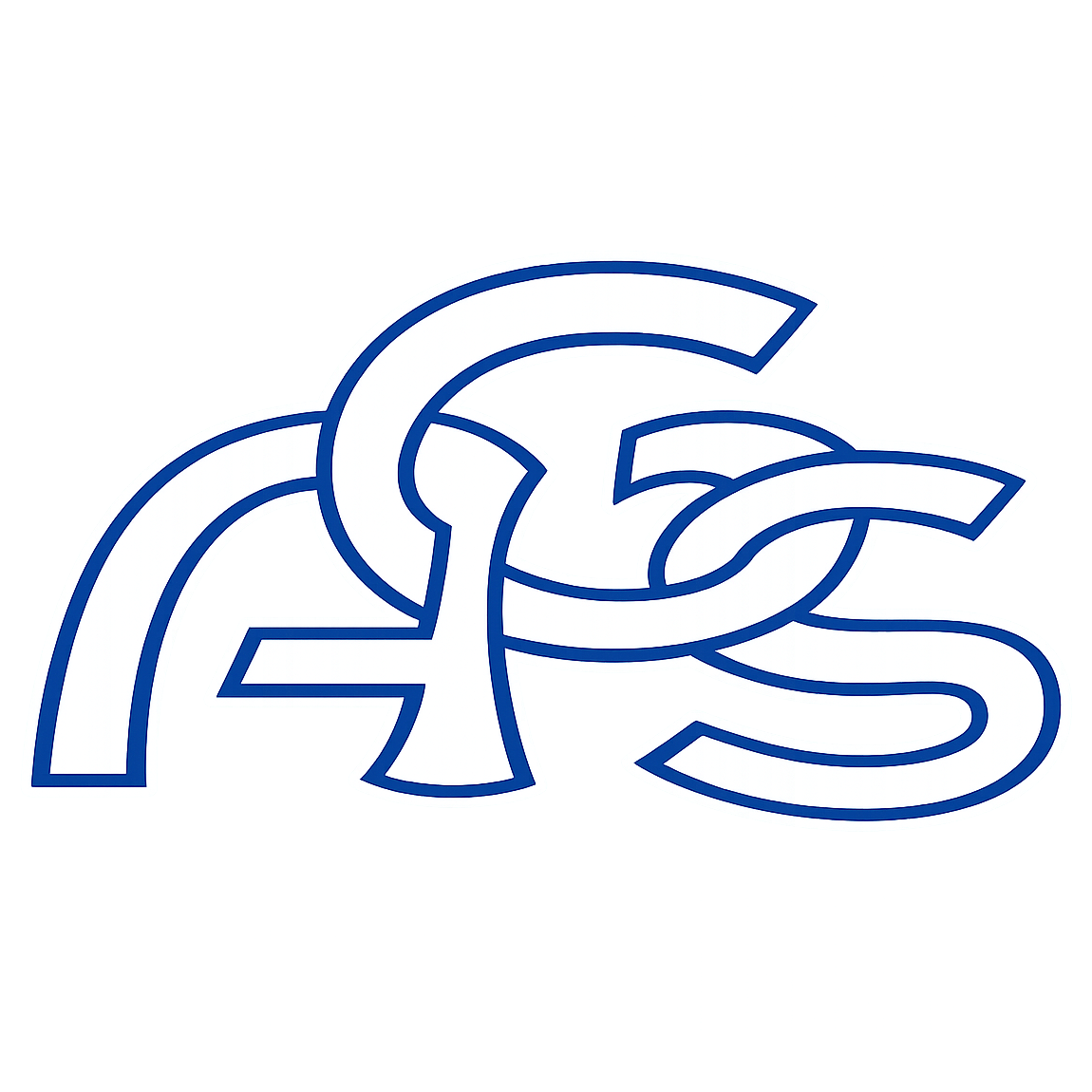
- Full name: Automobiles Gonfaronnaises Sportives
- Base: Gonfaron, France
- Founder(s): Henri Julien
- Noted staff: Cyril de Rouvre; Patrizio Cantù; Hugues de Chaunac; Gabriele Rafanelli; Christian Vanderpleyn; Claude Galopin
- Noted drivers: (Italy) Ivan Capelli (France) Pascal Fabre (Brazil) Roberto Moreno (France) Philippe Streiff (Germany) Joachim Winkelhock (Italy) Gabriele Tarquini (France) Yannick Dalmas (Sweden) Stefan Johansson (Italy) Fabrizio Barbazza (France) Olivier Grouillard

Formula One World Championship career
- First entry: 1986 Italian Grand Prix
- Races entered: 80
- Engines: Motori Moderni, Cosworth
- Constructors' Championships: 0
- Drivers' Championships: 0
- Race victories: 0 (best finish: 6th, 1987 Australian Grand Prix and 1989 Mexican Grand Prix)
- Pole positions: 0 (best grid position: 10th, 1988 Canadian Grand Prix)
- Fastest laps: 0
- Final entry: 1991 Spanish Grand Prix

Automobiles Gonfaronnaises Sportives (also known as AGS and Gonfaron Sports Cars) was a small French racecar constructor that competed in various racing categories over a period of thirty years, including Formula One from 1986 to 1991.

AGS survived as a prosperous Formula One driving school, in Le Luc, near Gonfaron.

== Foundation ==
The team was founded by the French mechanic, Henri Julien, who ran a filling station, the "Garage de l'Avenir", in Gonfaron, a French village in Provence. In the late 1950s and early 1960s, Julien regularly attended racing events in minor classes. Although not an outstanding driver, the technical knowledge he gained eventually prompted him to start constructing racing cars.

== First car ==
Julien's first car, the AGS JH1, saw the light of day in 1969. It was a small single-seater, intended for the category of "Formule France". The car was designed by Julien's former apprentice, the Belgian mechanic Christian Vanderpleyn, who had been with the garage (and the racing team) since the very late 1950s and who would stay on until 1988. Soon, AGS went progressed and manufactured its own Formula 3 cars, which were ambitious but not good enough to compete seriously with the state-of-art Martinis which dominated the series at the time.

== Formula 2 ==
AGS took another step ahead in 1978 when the team started competing in the European Formula 2 Championship. Still, the car - by now the AGS JH15 - was self-penned (by Vanderpleyn), self-built and self-run. Formula 2 was a difficult task for the small team, racing 1978 and 1979 without scoring any championship points. The early 1980s were somewhat better. AGS was one of the few teams who ran its own cars (Maurer, Minardi and Merzario were the others), and eventually the team was able to score points regularly. Soon some victories came, too. AGS made history when works driver Philippe Streiff won the final race of Formula 2 in 1984, using an AGS JH19C.

== Formula 3000 ==
In 1985, AGS switched to Formula 3000 with the JH20, based on the Duqueine VG4 Formula 3 chassis. The JH20 used a Cosworth DFV engine supplied through the Swiss tuning firm Mader. Results were mediocre in 1985 and 1986.

== Formula One ==
=== Beginnings ===
By late summer 1986, AGS entered the Italian Grand Prix in Monza, its first Formula One race. Its structure was somewhat bizarre: The team had no more than seven employees and was still operated from the Garage de l'Avenir in Gonfaron.

AGS appeared with a car that was once again penned by Vanderpleyn. The JH21C was a strange mixture between former AGS F3000 vehicles and Renault F1 parts which were used extensively. The car was powered by a well-used Motori Moderni turbo engine (the only time these Carlo Chiti-developed engines were given to a customer team) and driven by Italian Ivan Capelli. A few weeks before, the car had been tested at Paul Ricard by Didier Pironi, driving an F1 car for the first time since his leg-breaking accident in the 1982 German Grand Prix. Due to technical difficulties, neither in its first attempt nor in the following race in Portugal did Capelli see the finish.

For the team's first full F1 season in 1987, Vanderpleyn penned the JH22, which used a normally-aspirated Cosworth DFZ but was otherwise much the same as the JH21C. The car was initially driven by Pascal Fabre, who had driven for the team in Formula 2 in 1982. He proved to be a reliable driver, finishing eight of the first nine races, but was never in serious contention for scoring points and failed to qualify on three occasions. AGS improved in the last two races of the season when Fabre was replaced by the Brazilian Roberto Moreno (who saw his first chance in Formula One since 1982 when he had failed to qualify a Lotus works car). In Adelaide, Moreno scored the first championship point for AGS, which meant that the team finished the season equal on points with the better-financed Ligier and the returning March team.

=== Takeover ===
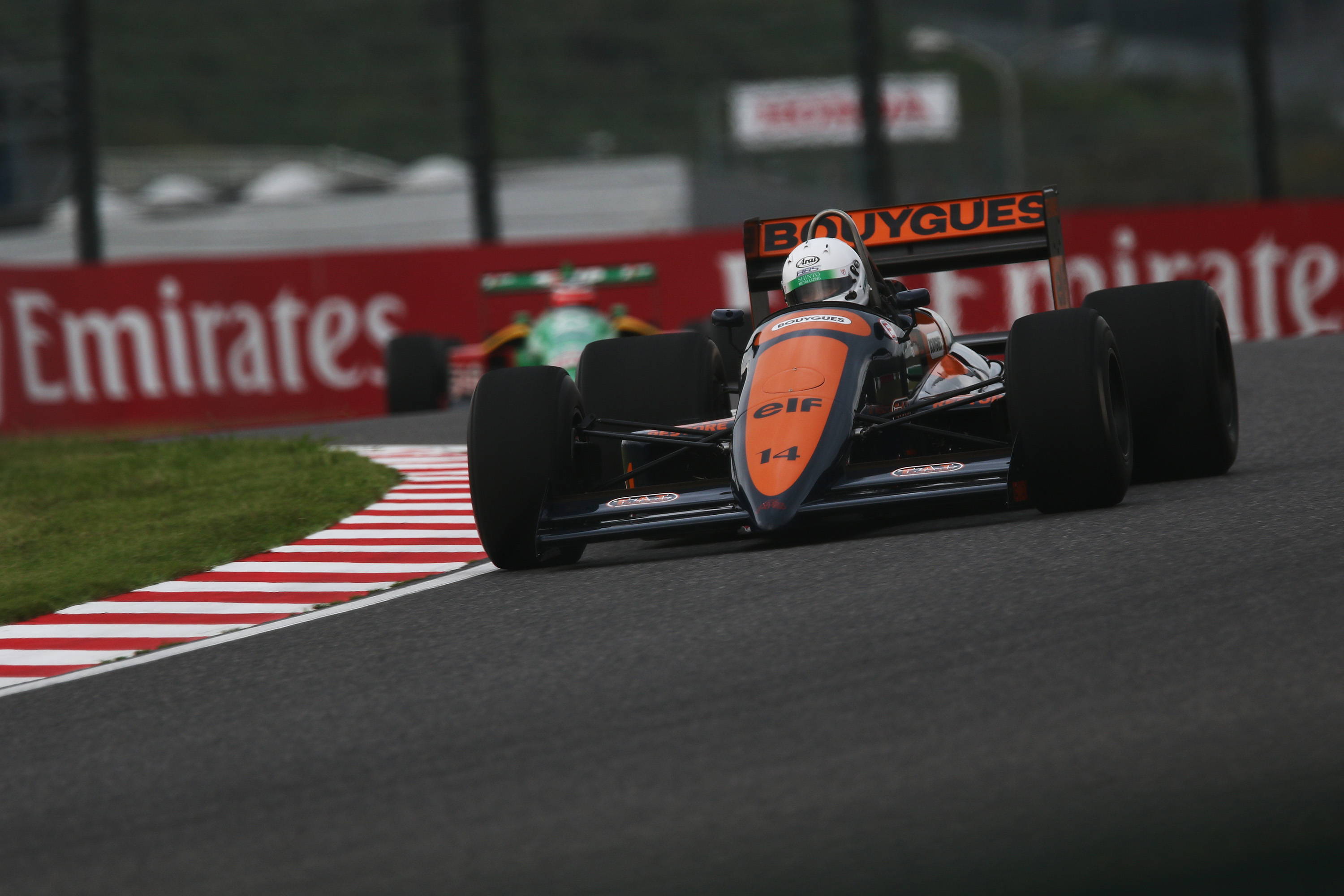
The AGS JH23 in a demonstration run at the 2018 Japanese Grand Prix.

In 1988, AGS started with a new car, the JH23, and Philippe Streiff as the team's only driver. Streiff drove quite powerfully and qualified well, but he saw the chequered flag only four times; in all the other events of that year technical failures or accidents were recorded. Financially, the year started well and ended with a disaster. AGS had a solid sponsor - the French Bouygues group - which promised to support not only the racing activity but also the completion of a new factory outside Gonfaron. After AGS had started work on the new facility, Bouygues withdrew from the team, leaving Julien without any support. To save the team, he eventually had to sell it to Cyril de Rouvre, a French entrepreneur with various ambitions.

=== Difficulties and second takeover ===
Things went soon from bad to worse. The new team management changed frequently (Vanderpleyn for instance went to Coloni) and brought a lot of disorder. Worse was to come; Streiff was paralysed in a testing accident in Brazil before the 1989 season.

Streiff was replaced with Gabriele Tarquini, who surprised with some great performances in the first half of the season. He was very close to the points in both the 1989 Monaco Grand Prix and 1989 United States Grand Prix, but retired in both races. Then things went better in the 1989 Mexican Grand Prix, where he finished sixth and scored his first point. But after these highlights, the team was never able to be as competitive again.

In the second part of the 1989 season, the team had to prequalify - a task that was nearly never achieved by Gabriele Tarquini and Yannick Dalmas. AGS then finished 15th in the Constructors' Championship, equal with the Lolas used by the Larrousse team. During the summer months, there were strong rumours that AGS would soon use a new W12 engine developed by the French designer Guy Nègre. This strange MGN (Moteurs Guy Nègre) machine saw the light of day in late 1988 and was tested in an old AGS JH22 chassis in the summer of 1989. It was clear that AGS was not related to these tests; they were completely private attempts by Nègre. The engine never found its way to a Grand Prix but it was announced to be used in a 1990 Le Mans car called Norma M6. The car was presented and attempted to race, but failed to qualify over engine issues.

Finally, AGS had to use Cosworth engines again in 1990. That year brought no improvement at all, Dalmas's 9th in the 1990 Spanish Grand Prix was the best result and by the beginning of the 1991 season the team was obviously close to its end. The team lacked money – at the first two Grands Prix of 1991, in Brazil and Phoenix the team's mechanics had to pay for their own hotel rooms. In the race itself, Tarquini finished 8th, which was the last finish ever of an AGS car. De Rouvre sold his team to some Italian entrepreneurs, Patrizio Cantù and Gabriele Rafanelli. Both changed little except for the driver line-up (Stefan Johansson was replaced with newcomer Fabrizio Barbazza) and the colours of the car (which were now blue, red and yellow instead of white). A new car, the JH27, was raced in the early autumn, but by then the team was in rags again, so the Italians closed the doors after the 1991 Spanish Grand Prix.

== Complete Formula Two results ==
(key)

Year	Chassis	Engine	Drivers	1	2	3	4	5	6	7	8	9	10	11	12	13
1978	JH15	BMW		THR	HOC1	NÜR	PAU	MUG	VLL	ROU	DON	NOG	ENN	MIS	HOC2	
1978	JH15	BMW	(France) Richard Dallest	NC	DNQ							11	Ret	16	DNQ	
1978	JH15	BMW	(France) José Dolhem				Ret	Ret		DNQ						
1979	JH15; JH16	BMW		SIL	HOC	THR	NÜR	VAL	MUG	PAU	HOC	ZAN	PER	MIS	DON	
1979	JH15; JH16	BMW	(France) José Dolhem	14												
1980	JH15; JH17	BMW		THR	HOC	NÜR	VAL	PAU	SIL	ZOL	MUG	ZAN	PER	MIS	HOC	
1980	JH15; JH17	BMW	(France) Richard Dallest	Ret	10	Ret	9	1	DNS	8	7	1	5	Ret	4	
1981	JH15; JH17; JH18	BMW		SIL	HOC	THR	NÜR	VAL	MUG	PAU	PER	SPA	DON	MIS	MAN	
1981	JH15; JH17; JH18	BMW	(France) Richard Dallest	Ret	Ret	Ret		Ret	7	Ret	9			5	5	
1981	JH15; JH17; JH18	BMW	(France) Patrick Gaillard				Ret									
1981	JH15; JH17; JH18	BMW	(United Kingdom) Tiff Needell										11			
1982	JH18; JH19	BMW		SIL	HOC	THR	NÜR	MUG	VAL	PAU	SPA	HOC	DON	MAN	PER	MIS
1982	JH18; JH19	BMW	(France) Philippe Streiff	10	Ret	5	Ret	Ret	2	Ret	4	Ret	5	2	4	Ret
1982	JH18; JH19	BMW	(France) Pascal Fabre	Ret	12	13	16	16	3	DNQ	19	Ret	Ret	6	8	9
1983	JH19; JH19B	BMW		SIL	THR	HOC	NÜR	VAL	PAU	JAR	DON	MIS	PER	ZOL	MUG	
1983	JH19; JH19B	BMW	(France) Philippe Streiff	5	8	Ret		5	8	4	3	Ret	2	3	3	
1983	JH19; JH19B	BMW	(Italy) Fulvio Ballabio					Ret	7	12	Ret	5	9	NC	6	
1984	JH19C	BMW		SIL	HOC	THR	VAL	MUG	PAU	HOC	MIS	PER	DON	BRH		
1984	JH19C	BMW	(France) Philippe Streiff	Ret	5	3	Ret	11	2	Ret	2	Ret	7	1		
1984	JH19C	BMW	(Italy) Stefano Livio								Ret					

== Complete Formula 3000 results ==
(key)

Year	Chassis	Engine	Drivers	1	2	3	4	5	6	7	8	9	10	11
1985	JH20	Cosworth		SIL	THR	EST	VAL	PAU	SPA	DIJ	PER	ZEL	ZAN	DON
1985	JH20	Cosworth	(France) Philippe Streiff	Ret	Ret	10	5	5	Ret	9	Ret	5	3	5
1986	JH20B	Cosworth		SIL	VAL	PAU	SPA	IMO	MUG	PER	ZEL	BIR	BUG	JAR
1986	JH20B	Cosworth	(France) Alain Ferté	13	Ret	Ret	14	3	7	18		Ret	Ret	Ret
1986	JH20B	Cosworth	(France) Richard Dallest			4	13	DNQ				Ret		

== Complete Formula One results ==
(key)

Year	Chassis	Engine	Tyres	Drivers	1	2	3	4	5	6	7	8	9	10	11	12	13	14	15	16	Points	WCC
1986	JH21C	Motori Moderni 615–90 1.5 V6 t	P		BRA	ESP	SMR	MON	BEL	CAN	DET	FRA	GBR	GER	HUN	AUT	ITA	POR	MEX	AUS	0	NC
1986	JH21C	Motori Moderni 615–90 1.5 V6 t	P	(Italy) Ivan Capelli													Ret	Ret			0	NC
1987	JH22	Ford Cosworth DFZ 3.5 V8	G		BRA	SMR	BEL	MON	DET	FRA	GBR	GER	HUN	AUT	ITA	POR	ESP	MEX	JPN	AUS	1	12th
1987	JH22	Ford Cosworth DFZ 3.5 V8	G	(France) Pascal Fabre	12	13	10	13	12	9	9	Ret	13	NC	DNQ	DNQ	Ret	DNQ			1	12th
1987	JH22	Ford Cosworth DFZ 3.5 V8	G	(Brazil) Roberto Moreno															Ret	6	1	12th
1988	JH23	Ford Cosworth DFZ 3.5 V8	G		BRA	SMR	MON	MEX	CAN	DET	FRA	GBR	GER	HUN	BEL	ITA	POR	ESP	JPN	AUS	0	NC
1988	JH23	Ford Cosworth DFZ 3.5 V8	G	(France) Philippe Streiff	Ret	10	DNS	12	Ret	Ret	Ret	Ret	Ret	Ret	10	Ret	9	Ret	8	11	0	NC
1989	JH23B; JH24	Ford Cosworth DFR 3.5 V8	G		BRA	SMR	MON	MEX	USA	CAN	FRA	GBR	GER	HUN	BEL	ITA	POR	ESP	JPN	AUS	1	15th
1989	JH23B; JH24	Ford Cosworth DFR 3.5 V8	G	(France) Philippe Streiff	WD																1	15th
1989	JH23B; JH24	Ford Cosworth DFR 3.5 V8	G	(Italy) Gabriele Tarquini		8	Ret	6	7	Ret	Ret	DNQ	DNPQ	DNPQ	DNPQ	DNPQ	DNPQ	DNPQ	DNPQ	DNPQ	1	15th
1989	JH23B; JH24	Ford Cosworth DFR 3.5 V8	G	(West Germany) Joachim Winkelhock	DNPQ	DNPQ	DNPQ	DNPQ	DNPQ	DNPQ	DNPQ										1	15th
1989	JH23B; JH24	Ford Cosworth DFR 3.5 V8	G	(France) Yannick Dalmas								DNPQ	DNPQ	DNPQ	DNPQ	DNPQ	DNPQ	DNPQ	DNPQ	DNPQ	1	15th
1990	JH24; JH25	Ford Cosworth DFR 3.5 V8	G		USA	BRA	SMR	MON	CAN	MEX	FRA	GBR	GER	HUN	BEL	ITA	POR	ESP	JPN	AUS	0	NC
1990	JH24; JH25	Ford Cosworth DFR 3.5 V8	G	(Italy) Gabriele Tarquini	DNPQ	DNPQ	DNPQ	DNPQ	DNPQ	DNPQ	DNQ	Ret	DNPQ	13	DNQ	DNQ	DNQ	Ret	DNQ	Ret	0	NC
1990	JH24; JH25	Ford Cosworth DFR 3.5 V8	G	(France) Yannick Dalmas	DNPQ	Ret	DNPQ	DNPQ	DNPQ	DNPQ	17	DNPQ	DNQ	DNQ	DNQ	NC	Ret	9	DNQ	DNQ	0	NC
1991	JH25B; JH27	Ford Cosworth DFR 3.5 V8	G		USA	BRA	SMR	MON	CAN	MEX	FRA	GBR	GER	HUN	BEL	ITA	POR	ESP	JPN	AUS	0	NC
1991	JH25B; JH27	Ford Cosworth DFR 3.5 V8	G	(Italy) Gabriele Tarquini	8	Ret	DNQ	Ret	DNQ	DNQ	DNQ	DNQ	DNQ	DNPQ	DNPQ	DNPQ	DNQ				0	NC
1991	JH25B; JH27	Ford Cosworth DFR 3.5 V8	G	(France) Olivier Grouillard														DNPQ			0	NC
1991	JH25B; JH27	Ford Cosworth DFR 3.5 V8	G	(Sweden) Stefan Johansson	DNQ	DNQ															0	NC
1991	JH25B; JH27	Ford Cosworth DFR 3.5 V8	G	(Italy) Fabrizio Barbazza			DNQ	DNQ	DNQ	DNQ	DNQ	DNQ	DNPQ	DNPQ	DNPQ	DNPQ	DNPQ	DNPQ			0	NC

== Bibliography ==
- Gamand, Gérard (24 February 2023). AGS – Une aventure extraordinaire: du racer 500 à la formule 1 (in French). Paris: Autodiva.
