= AGS JH22 =

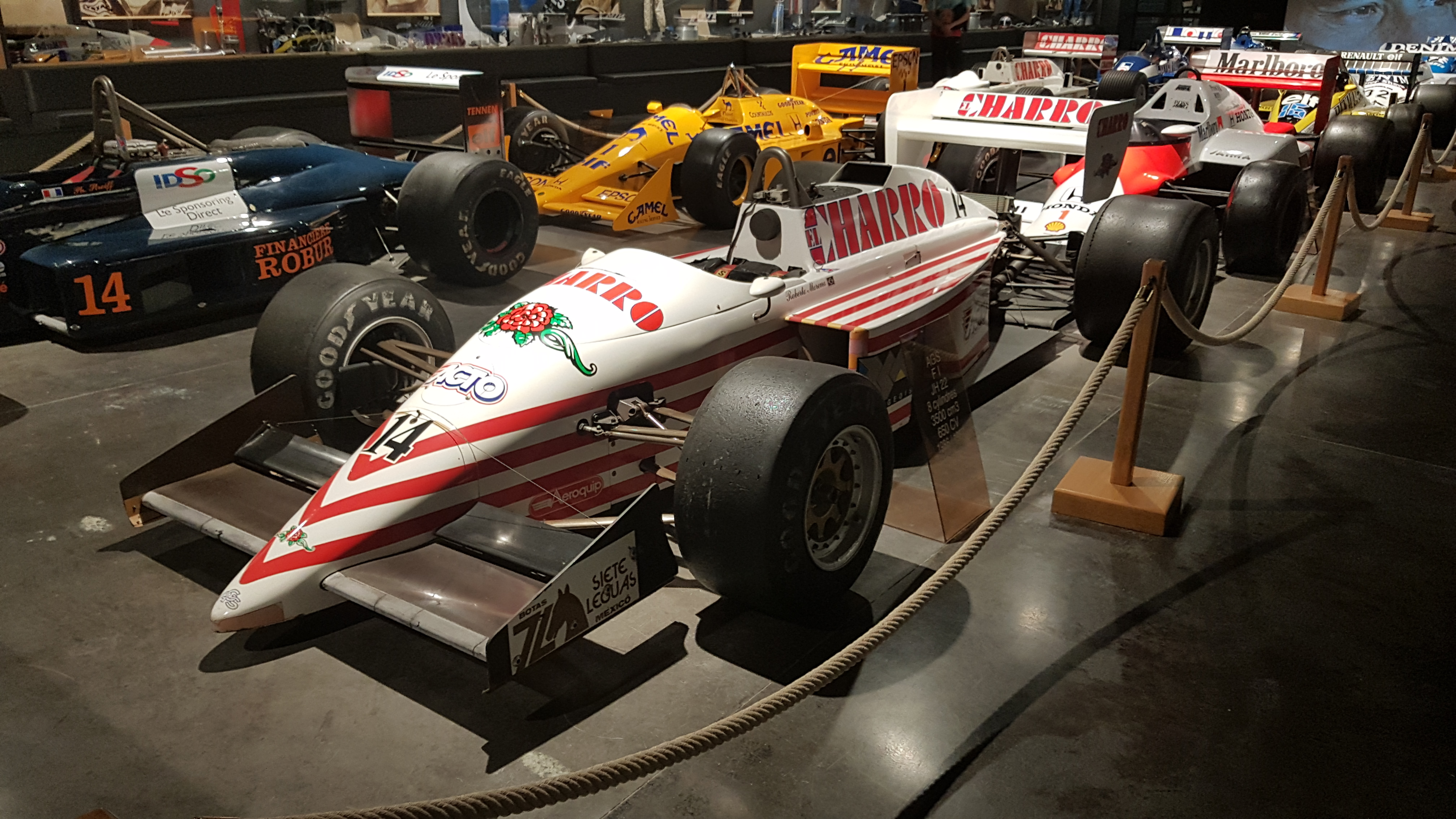
- Category: Formula One
- Constructor: AGS
- Designers: Christian Vanderpleyn (Technical Director); Michel Costa (Chief Designer)
- Predecessor: JH21
- Successor: JH23

Technical specifications
- Chassis: Carbon fibre and Aluminium monocoque
- Suspension (front): Double wishbones, springs, pushrods
- Suspension (rear): Double wishbones, springs, pushrods
- Length: 4,289 millimetres (168.9 in)
- Width: 2,122 millimetres (83.5 in)
- Height: 1,001 millimetres (39.4 in)
- Axle track: Front: 1,700 mm (67 in); Rear: 1,560 mm (61 in)
- Wheelbase: 2,870 mm (113.0 in)
- Engine: Cosworth DFZ, 3,494 cc (213.2 cu in), 90° V8, NA, mid-engine, longitudinally mounted
- Transmission: Renault / Hewland 5/6-speed manual
- Power: 590 brake horsepower (600 PS; 440 kW) @ 11,500 rpm 434 newton-metres (320 lbf⋅ft) @ 6,900 rpm
- Weight: 520 kg (1,150 lb)
- Fuel: Avgas / Atco
- Tyres: Goodyear

Competition history
- Notable entrants: Team El Charro AGS
- Notable drivers: 14. (France) Pascal Fabre; 14. (Brazil) Roberto Moreno
- Debut: 1987 Brazilian Grand Prix
Races	Wins	Poles	F/Laps
16	0	0	0
- Constructors' Championships: 0
- Drivers' Championships: 0

The AGS JH22 was a Formula One racing car designed by Christian Vanderpleyn and used by the French AGS team in the 1987 Formula One season.

== Background ==
The JH22 was noted as a development of the Renault-based JH21C that the team had used in two races towards the end of 1986. However, while the JH21C had been fitted with a Motori Moderni turbocharged engine and Pirelli tyres, the JH22 was fitted with a normally-aspirated Ford-Cosworth DFZ V8 engine and Goodyear tyres. It also carried a 1970s-style airbox aft of the fuel tank, although this was replaced with a smaller and more conventional air intake as the season progressed.

As in 1986, AGS chose to enter one car for the season, and so built only two chassis, labeled #32 and #33. Italian shoe and clothing company El Charro continued as the team's main sponsor, and so the car, numbered 14, was painted in a white and red livery with a large rose above the nosecone. Frenchman Pascal Fabre, who had driven for the team in Formula Two in 1982, was signed to drive.

As one of four teams running normally-aspirated engines at the start of the season (the others being Tyrrell, the returning March and newcomers Larrousse), AGS contested the one-off Colin Chapman Trophy in addition to the regular Constructors' Championship, while Fabre contested the drivers' equivalent, the Jim Clark Trophy.

== Performance ==
The JH22 was slow from the outset, and Fabre usually qualified last, at least a second slower than the car immediately in front. However, the car proved reliable on race day, as the Frenchman was classified in eight of the first nine races (albeit at least five laps down in each), his best results being 9th on home soil in France and in Britain.

Fabre also made it to the finish line in Austria, but did not complete enough laps to be classified. But as the entry list expanded with the Osella and Larrousse teams deciding to run a second car and the Coloni team making its F1 debut, making the grid became a great deal harder, and Fabre failed to do so in three of the next four races.

For the final two races of the season in Japan and Australia, the team decided to replace Fabre with Roberto Moreno, appearing in Formula One for the first time since failing to qualify a Lotus at the 1982 Dutch Grand Prix. The Brazilian scraped onto the grid in both races, and in Adelaide took advantage of a large attrition rate to finish 7th, three laps down. But when compatriot Ayrton Senna was disqualified from 2nd for having oversized brake ducts, Moreno was promoted to 6th, scoring his and AGS's first championship point.

At the end of the season, AGS were equal 11th in the Constructors' Championship and third in the Colin Chapman Trophy. Fabre finished fifth in the Jim Clark Trophy with 35 points, while Moreno's result in Adelaide gave him sixth in that competition with four points, as well as equal 19th in the Drivers' Championship.

== After Formula One ==
For 1988, the JH22 was replaced with the JH23. One of the two chassis remains in AGS's historic collection, while the other is on display at the Manoir de l'Automobile in the commune of Lohéac, Brittany.

== Complete Formula One results ==
(key)

Year	Entrant	Engine	Tyres	Drivers	1	2	3	4	5	6	7	8	9	10	11	12	13	14	15	16	Pts.	WCC
1987	Team El Charro AGS	Cosworth DFZ; V8 NA	G		BRA	SMR	BEL	MON	DET	FRA	GBR	GER	HUN	AUT	ITA	POR	ESP	MEX	JPN	AUS	1	12th
1987	Team El Charro AGS	Cosworth DFZ; V8 NA	G	Pascal Fabre	12	13	10	13	12	9	9	Ret	13	NC	DNQ	DNQ	Ret	DNQ			1	12th
1987	Team El Charro AGS	Cosworth DFZ; V8 NA	G	Roberto Moreno															Ret	6	1	12th

== Colin Chapman Trophy (for constructors of cars equipped with naturally aspirated engines) ==
(key)

Year	Entrant	Engine	Tyres	Drivers	1	2	3	4	5	6	7	8	9	10	11	12	13	14	15	16	Pts.	CCT
1987	Team El Charro AGS	Cosworth DFZ; V8 NA	G		BRA	SMR	BEL	MON	DET	FRA	GBR	GER	HUN	AUT	ITA	POR	ESP	MEX	JPN	AUS	41	3rd
1987	Team El Charro AGS	Cosworth DFZ; V8 NA	G	Pascal Fabre	3	3	3	3	2	3	2	Ret	4	NC	DNQ	DNQ	Ret	DNQ			41	3rd
1987	Team El Charro AGS	Cosworth DFZ; V8 NA	G	Roberto Moreno															Ret	3	41	3rd
