= Richard Dallest =

French former racing driver

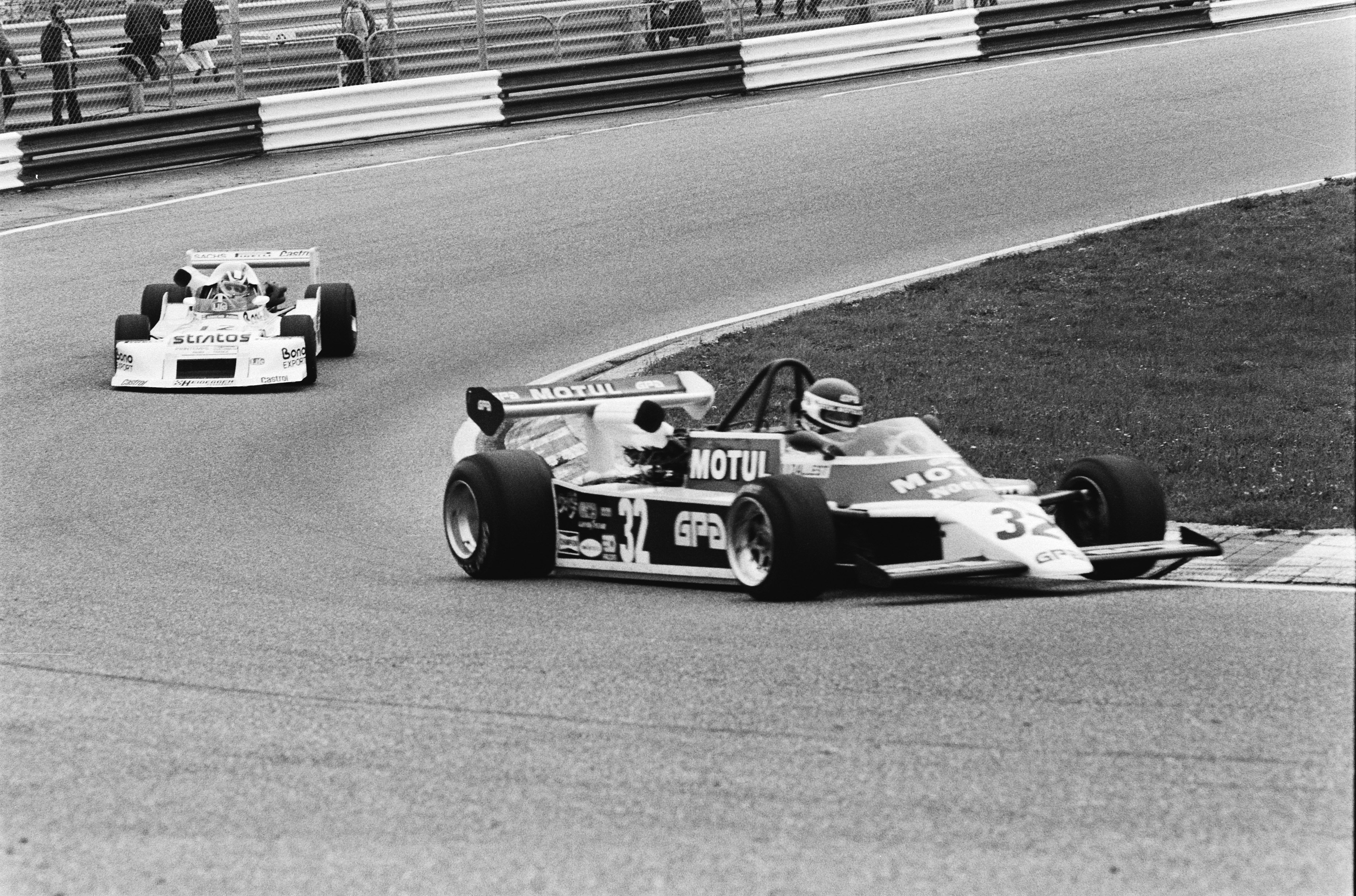
Richard Dallest

Richard Dallest (born 15 February 1951) is a French former racing driver.

== Racing record ==
=== Complete European Formula Two Championship results ===
(key) (Races in bold indicate pole position; races in italics indicate fastest lap)

Year	Entrant	Chassis	Engine	1	2	3	4	5	6	7	8	9	10	11	12	13	Pos.	Pts
1978	Sol-Amor GPA Motul	AGS JH15	BMW	THR; NC	HOC; DNQ	NÜR	PAU	MUG	VAL	ROU	DON	NOG; 11	PER; Ret	MIS; 16	HOC; DNQ		NC	0
1980	Ecurie Motul GPA	AGS JH17	BMW	THR; Ret	HOC; 10	**NÜR**; Ret	VAL; 9	PAU; 1	SIL; DNS	ZOL; 8	MUG; 7			MIS; Ret	HOC; 4		6th	23
1980	Ecurie Motul GPA	AGS JH19	BMW									**ZAN**; 1					6th	23
1980	Ecurie Motul GPA	AGS JH15	BMW										PER; 5				6th	23
1981	Team AGS Motul GPA	AGS JH17	BMW	SIL; Ret	HOC; Ret	THR; Ret	NÜR										17th	4
1981	Team AGS Motul GPA	AGS JH18	BMW					VAL; Ret	MUG; 7	PAU; Ret				MIS; 5	MAN; 5		17th	4
1981	Team AGS Motul GPA	AGS JH15	BMW								PER; 9	SPA	DON				17th	4
1982	Merzario Team	Merzario 282	BMW	SIL; DNS	HOC; Ret	THR; 6	NÜR; Ret	MUG	VAL	PAU	SPA	HOC	DON	MAN	PER	MIS	17th	1
1983	Merzario Team Srl	Merzario M28	BMW	SIL	THR	HOC	NÜR; Ret	VAL; Ret	PAU; Ret	JAR; 8	DON	MIS; 7	PER; Ret	ZOL	MUG; 8		NC	0

=== Complete International Formula 3000 results ===
(key) (Races in bold indicate pole position; races in italics indicate fastest lap.)

Year	Entrant	Chassis	Engine	1	2	3	4	5	6	7	8	9	10	11	Pos.	Pts
1986	Equipe Danielson	AGS JH20B	Cosworth	SIL	VAL	PAU; 4	SPA; 13	IMO; DNQ	MUG	PER	ÖST	BIR	BUG; Ret	JAR	17th	3
