= 1989 Canadian Grand Prix =

- Race 6 of 16 in the 1989 Formula One World Championship

Race details
- Date: 18 June 1989
- Official name: XXVII Grand Prix Molson du Canada
- Location: Circuit Gilles Villeneuve; Montreal, Quebec, Canada
- Course: Partial street circuit
- Course length: 4.390 km (2.728 miles)
- Distance: 69 laps, 302.910 km (188.220 miles)
- Weather: Cool and rainy with temperatures approaching 24 °C (75 °F); wind speeds up to 17.9 kilometres per hour (11.1 mph)

Pole position
Driver	(France) Alain Prost	McLaren-Honda
- Time: 1:20.973

Fastest lap
Driver	(United Kingdom) Jonathan Palmer	Tyrrell-Ford
- Time: 1:31.925 on lap 11

Podium
First	(Belgium) Thierry Boutsen	Williams-Renault
Second	(Italy) Riccardo Patrese	Williams-Renault
Third	(Italy) Andrea de Cesaris	Dallara-Ford

The 1989 Canadian Grand Prix was a Formula One motor race held at Circuit Gilles Villeneuve on 18 June 1989. It was the sixth race of the 1989 Formula One World Championship.

The 69-lap race was won by Belgian driver Thierry Boutsen, driving a Williams-Renault. Boutsen took his first F1 victory, and the first for Williams with Renault engines, after Brazilian Ayrton Senna suffered an engine failure in his McLaren-Honda late on. Boutsen's Italian teammate Riccardo Patrese finished second with another Italian, Andrea de Cesaris, third in a Dallara-Ford.

== Qualifying ==
=== Pre-qualifying report ===
Stefano Modena was comfortably fastest in the pre-qualifying session in his Brabham, over a second faster than the Osella of Nicola Larini. Both their team-mates failed to pre-qualify; it was the first time a Brabham had failed to pre-qualify this season as Martin Brundle was fifth after suffering various car-related issues, and Osella's Piercarlo Ghinzani was down in eighth, over two seconds behind Larini. It was Ghinzani's sixth successive failure to pre-qualify. Stefan Johansson was third fastest in the Onyx, but his team-mate Bertrand Gachot failed to pre-qualify in sixth, also his sixth successive failure. The last pre-qualifier was Alex Caffi in the Dallara, in fourth.

The other entrants to fail to pre-qualify on the Friday morning included Gregor Foitek, seventh in the sole EuroBrun, who had failed to pre-qualify on the previous four occasions, and both the underpowered Zakspeeds, with Bernd Schneider ninth and Aguri Suzuki a distant twelfth. The AGS of Joachim Winkelhock was tenth and Volker Weidler's Rial was eleventh; both Germans' sixth successive failures to pre-qualify. Pierre-Henri Raphanel was bottom of the time sheets in thirteenth, not recording a representative time in his Coloni.

=== Pre-qualifying classification ===
Pos	No	Driver	Constructor	Time	Gap
1	8	(Italy) Stefano Modena	Brabham-Judd	1:23.398	—
2	17	(Italy) Nicola Larini	Osella-Ford	1:24.550	+1.152
3	36	(Sweden) Stefan Johansson	Onyx-Ford	1:24.764	+1.366
4	21	(Italy) Alex Caffi	Dallara-Ford	1:24.778	+1.380
5	7	(United Kingdom) Martin Brundle	Brabham-Judd	1:25.275	+1.877
6	37	(Belgium) Bertrand Gachot	Onyx-Ford	1.25.952	+2.554
7	33	(Switzerland) Gregor Foitek	EuroBrun-Judd	1:26.365	+2.967
8	18	(Italy) Piercarlo Ghinzani	Osella-Ford	1:26.807	+3.409
9	34	(Germany) Bernd Schneider	Zakspeed-Yamaha	1:27.073	+3.675
10	41	(Germany) Joachim Winkelhock	AGS-Ford	1:28.545	+5.147
11	39	(Germany) Volker Weidler	Rial-Ford	1:31.455	+8.057
12	35	(Japan) Aguri Suzuki	Zakspeed-Yamaha	1:53.327	+29.929
13	32	(France) Pierre-Henri Raphanel	Coloni-Ford	1:59.693	+36.295

=== Qualifying report ===
Nearly all the thirty drivers who took part in qualifying posted their faster times on Friday afternoon, as the Saturday session was cold, windy, overcast and sometimes wet. Of the front runners, only Ayrton Senna was able to come close to matching his Friday time, but the Brazilian was denied his ninth consecutive pole position by his McLaren team-mate Alain Prost, by just under eight hundredths of a second. The second row was filled by Riccardo Patrese in the Williams and Gerhard Berger's Ferrari, with the third row occupied by their team-mates; Ferrari's Nigel Mansell a tenth or two faster than Williams' Thierry Boutsen.

Modena put the sole remaining Brabham a fine seventh on the grid, the top V8 and the top Pirelli-tyred runner, with another pre-qualifier, Caffi, alongside him in eighth. Caffi's Dallara team-mate, Andrea de Cesaris, shared the fifth row with the Lola of Philippe Alliot. The Minardi of Pierluigi Martini was eleventh, with Derek Warwick in the Arrows twelfth.

Alessandro Nannini suffered balance issues in his Benetton to qualify 13th, alongside Jonathan Palmer's Tyrrell. Pre-qualifier Larini was 15th in the surviving Osella, with the second Arrows of Eddie Cheever in 16th. Mauricio Gugelmin qualified his March 17th, alongside the last pre-qualifier, Johansson's Onyx.

Triple World Champion Nelson Piquet could only manage 19th spot in his Lotus, with the second Tyrrell of Michele Alboreto 20th. The second March of Ivan Capelli was 21st, alongside the only Ligier to qualify, that of René Arnoux, amid rumours of his retirement. Christian Danner qualified the sole remaining Rial 23rd, and was one of the few drivers to improve his time on Saturday, with the second Minardi of Spaniard Luis Pérez-Sala in 24th. The back row consisted of the AGS of Gabriele Tarquini, and the Coloni of Roberto Moreno, who narrowly qualified on Saturday after failing to post a representative time on Friday. In total, the drivers of the record 18 out of 20 participating teams qualified for the race.

The four non-qualifiers were Satoru Nakajima in the second Lotus, the Lola of Yannick Dalmas, and the Benetton of Johnny Herbert, who surprisingly missed the cut after being unable to balance his car satisfactorily, marginally quicker than the second Ligier of Olivier Grouillard, who was slowest with gearbox problems. The last three failed to qualify on Saturday despite improving on their Friday times. Herbert was subsequently dropped for three months by Benetton, and replaced by McLaren test driver Emanuele Pirro for the next race, after it was decided that Herbert needed more time to recover from the leg and ankle injuries he had sustained in the Formula 3000 race at Brands Hatch in 1988.

=== Qualifying classification ===
Pos	No	Driver	Constructor	Q1	Q2	Gap
1	2	(France) Alain Prost	McLaren-Honda	1:20.973	1:22.269	—
2	1	(Brazil) Ayrton Senna	McLaren-Honda	1:21.049	1:21.269	+0.076
3	6	(Italy) Riccardo Patrese	Williams-Renault	1:21.783	1:23.738	+0.810
4	28	(Austria) Gerhard Berger	Ferrari	1:21.946	1:22.305	+0.973
5	27	(United Kingdom) Nigel Mansell	Ferrari	1:22.165	1:22.751	+1.192
6	5	(Belgium) Thierry Boutsen	Williams-Renault	1:22.311	1:24.004	+1.338
7	8	(Italy) Stefano Modena	Brabham-Judd	1:22.612	1:23.599	+1.639
8	21	(Italy) Alex Caffi	Dallara-Ford	1:22.901	1:24.957	+1.928
9	22	(Italy) Andrea de Cesaris	Dallara-Ford	1:23.050	1:24.444	+2.077
10	30	(France) Philippe Alliot	Lola-Lamborghini	1:23.059	—	+2.086
11	23	(Italy) Pierluigi Martini	Minardi-Ford	1:23.252	1:25.195	+2.279
12	9	(United Kingdom) Derek Warwick	Arrows-Ford	1:23.348	1:23.833	+2.375
13	19	(Italy) Alessandro Nannini	Benetton-Ford	1:23.542	1:24.279	+2.569
14	3	(United Kingdom) Jonathan Palmer	Tyrrell-Ford	1:23.665	1:23.876	+2.692
15	17	(Italy) Nicola Larini	Osella-Ford	1:23.799	1:25.289	+2.826
16	10	(United States) Eddie Cheever	Arrows-Ford	1:23.828	1:24.693	+2.855
17	15	(Brazil) Maurício Gugelmin	March-Judd	1:23.863	1:24.734	+2.890
18	36	(Sweden) Stefan Johansson	Onyx-Ford	1:23.974	1:24.918	+3.001
19	11	(Brazil) Nelson Piquet	Lotus-Judd	1:24.029	1:25.825	+3.056
20	4	(Italy) Michele Alboreto	Tyrrell-Ford	1:24.296	1:25.412	+3.323
21	16	(Italy) Ivan Capelli	March-Judd	1:24.406	1:25.094	+3.433
22	25	(France) René Arnoux	Ligier-Ford	1:24.558	1:25.394	+3.585
23	38	(Germany) Christian Danner	Rial-Ford	1:25.298	1:24.727	+3.754
24	24	(Spain) Luis Pérez-Sala	Minardi-Ford	1:24.786	1:25.570	+3.813
25	40	(Italy) Gabriele Tarquini	AGS-Ford	1:24.793	1:25.246	+3.820
26	31	(Brazil) Roberto Moreno	Coloni-Ford	47:24.470	1:25.037	+4.064
27	12	(Japan) Satoru Nakajima	Lotus-Judd	1:25.051	1:26.358	+4.078
28	29	(France) Yannick Dalmas	Lola-Lamborghini	1:25.317	1:25.161	+4.188
29	20	(United Kingdom) Johnny Herbert	Benetton-Ford	1:25.335	1:25.282	+4.309
30	26	(France) Olivier Grouillard	Ligier-Ford	1:25.382	1:25.289	+4.316

== Race ==
=== Race report ===
The weather on Sunday morning was very poor, with heavy rain. The first start was aborted after Berger stalled his engine on the grid, meaning the intended 70 laps race distance was reduced to 69. The rain began to recede, and Mansell, Nannini and Sala elected to pit for slick tyres at the end of the second formation lap, and start from the pit lane. However, with apparently no guidance from pit lane marshals or lights, Mansell and Nannini changed their tyres and left the pit lane to rejoin the circuit 17 seconds before the starting procedure had been completed and the green lights were shown to the rest of the field. Both cars circulated ahead of the pack for a few laps until they were caught by the leaders and then black-flagged, i.e. disqualified, for starting the race too early.

At the start the rest of the field got away cleanly, except for Modena and Martini, who collided and both retired. Alboreto pitted his Tyrrell to retire with electrical problems. Prost led from Senna, Patrese, Berger, Boutsen, de Cesaris and Alliot, who had made a strong start. At the end of the lap Prost and Caffi pitted for slick tyres. On the following lap Prost entered the pits again, and retired there with front suspension failure. This left Senna leading as Boutsen passed Berger for third, and the order changed several times over the next few laps as drivers pitted for dry tyres, although the rain soon returned. Cheever retired from eighth position with an electrical fault. Senna was one of those to pit on lap four, and dropped to fifth, leaving Patrese in the lead from Boutsen, Berger and Alliot. Berger repassed Boutsen for second place, but immediately retired with a broken alternator belt. Designer John Barnard later said, "It isn't the actual gearbox that gives trouble. It's the electrical ancillaries which keep packing up." Further back, Tarquini spun out of the race, having just passed Arnoux for eighth place.

Senna passed Alliot for third, behind the two Williams cars of Patrese and Boutsen. This order continued until lap 11, with Warwick fifth, ahead of Larini, Arnoux, Danner, Capelli and Sala. Next were the two Dallaras of Caffi and de Cesaris, followed by Palmer, Piquet and Gugelmin. The last two runners, Moreno and Johansson, had already been lapped.

On lap 11, Boutsen and Capelli pitted, and on the next lap Gugelmin dropped out with electrical problems, while Sala crashed his Minardi into the barriers having inherited eighth place. At the back, Johansson pitted his Onyx for a second time, but emerged dragging a tyre gun, air line and part of the metal pit gantry on to the track. He was shown the black flag, but later claimed not to have seen it, and was disqualified for ignoring it.

On lap 14, Warwick passed Alliot to move into fourth place, while both Dallaras passed Danner, who dropped to ninth. On lap 15, Larini also passed Alliot, while the Dallaras both passed Arnoux. Boutsen passed Danner and then Arnoux, moving up to eighth. On lap 17, Alliot pitted from fifth, while the Dallaras passed Larini's Osella. Piquet overtook Palmer for 11th. The order at the end of lap 18 was Patrese, Senna, Warwick, Caffi, de Cesaris, Larini, Boutsen, Arnoux, Danner, Piquet, Palmer and Alliot, with Capelli and Moreno a lap adrift.

Boutsen pitted his Williams again, finding that slick tyres were not the correct choice. Senna was also still on slick tyres at this stage of the race, and was struggling for traction on the wet parts of the circuit. On lap 21 he pitted for wet tyres and dropped to sixth. De Cesaris and Larini passed Caffi, and further back, Alliot started moving back through the field, passing Palmer and Piquet. On lap 22, Larini passed de Cesaris, taking the Osella into third place. Both Dallaras then pitted, allowing Senna back up to fourth place.

Alliot passed Danner and was up to sixth place in the Lola when he spun out of the race on lap 27. Two laps later, Capelli spun out of 12th place. Boutsen moved up a couple of places to fifth, passing Danner and Arnoux again, while Senna finally caught and passed Larini for third. Palmer overtook Danner for eighth place. On lap 34, Larini's Osella failed with electrical problems with the Italian still running strongly in fourth place. Patrese had been on wet tyres since the start, and he finally pitted to change them on lap 35, leaving Warwick, also still on wets, to take the lead of the race in the Arrows. Palmer then crashed out from seventh place in the sole remaining Tyrrell, having secured what would be the fastest lap of the race. It proved to be the only fastest lap of Palmer's career.

Senna caught Warwick after the British driver had led for four laps, and passed him on lap 39. Warwick dropped out of the race from second place on the following lap, with engine failure. Piquet passed Arnoux to move up to fifth place. There followed a period of relative stability, with only nine cars left circulating, with 28 laps remaining. Senna led from Patrese and Boutsen, with de Cesaris fourth, ahead of Piquet, Arnoux, Danner, Caffi and Moreno. Danner and Caffi both spun several times and had been lapped more than once, as had Moreno, who lost a front wheel and drove back to the pits on three wheels for a replacement. Caffi passed Danner for seventh on lap 50, and Moreno finally dropped out with differential failure after completing 57 laps.

On lap 63, Patrese and Boutsen came up behind Piquet, who was lapping Danner's Rial. Boutsen took his chance and overtook his team-mate for second place before they lapped Danner. Patrese had been losing downforce and grip due to a loose diffuser on the rear of his car. By this time, only Senna and the two Williams cars were on the lead lap. Then on lap 67, with Senna comfortably ahead, the V10 Honda engine in his McLaren failed, and he pulled on to the infield just after the start-finish line to retire.

Boutsen inherited the lead, and led the last three laps to beat his team-mate Patrese by just over thirty seconds. De Cesaris and Piquet, having unlapped themselves with Senna's retirement, finished third and fourth. Arnoux was fifth in the Ligier, with Caffi a further lap down in sixth, both Dallaras finishing in the points. Senna was classified seventh ahead of Danner eighth, the last surviving runner, three laps adrift. Boutsen later said, "I couldn't believe my eyes when I saw the 'P1' sign, and I drove very carefully for the rest of the race."

It was Boutsen's first Grand Prix victory (and the first victory for a Belgian driver since the 1972 German Grand Prix with Jacky Ickx), and Patrese's third successive second-place finish. It was Dallara's first podium finish, and the only time both their cars finished in the points. It proved to be the last podium finish for de Cesaris, and the last points finish for Arnoux. It also proved to be Christian Danner's last race in Formula One, as he failed to qualify for any further Grands Prix before Rial left the sport at the end of the season. The 1989 Canadian Grand Prix also marked the one year anniversary of Frank Williams announcing Renault's return to F1 for 1989, having announced it in Canada during 1988.

=== Race classification ===
Pos	No	Driver	Constructor	Laps	Time/Retired	Grid	Points
1	5	(Belgium) Thierry Boutsen	Williams-Renault	69	2:01:24.073	6	9
2	6	(Italy) Riccardo Patrese	Williams-Renault	69	+ 30.007	3	6
3	22	(Italy) Andrea de Cesaris	Dallara-Ford	69	+ 1:36.649	9	4
4	11	(Brazil) Nelson Piquet	Lotus-Judd	69	+ 1:41.484	19	3
5	25	(France) René Arnoux	Ligier-Ford	68	+ 1 lap	22	2
6	21	(Italy) Alex Caffi	Dallara-Ford	67	+ 2 laps	8	1
7	1	(Brazil) Ayrton Senna	McLaren-Honda	66	Engine	2	
8	38	(Germany) Christian Danner	Rial-Ford	66	+ 3 laps	23	
Ret	31	(Brazil) Roberto Moreno	Coloni-Ford	57	Differential	26	
Ret	9	(United Kingdom) Derek Warwick	Arrows-Ford	40	Engine	12	
Ret	3	(United Kingdom) Jonathan Palmer	Tyrrell-Ford	35	Spun off	14	
Ret	17	(Italy) Nicola Larini	Osella-Ford	33	Electrical	15	
Ret	16	(Italy) Ivan Capelli	March-Judd	28	Spun off	21	
Ret	30	(France) Philippe Alliot	Lola-Lamborghini	26	Spun off	10	
DSQ	36	(Sweden) Stefan Johansson	Onyx-Ford	13	Ignored black flag	18	
Ret	24	(Spain) Luis Pérez-Sala	Minardi-Ford	11	Accident	24	
Ret	15	(Brazil) Maurício Gugelmin	March-Judd	11	Electrical	17	
Ret	28	(Austria) Gerhard Berger	Ferrari	6	Alternator belt	4	
Ret	40	(Italy) Gabriele Tarquini	AGS-Ford	6	Spun off	25	
Ret	10	(United States) Eddie Cheever	Arrows-Ford	3	Electrics	16	
Ret	2	(France) Alain Prost	McLaren-Honda	2	Suspension	1	
DSQ	27	(United Kingdom) Nigel Mansell	Ferrari	0	Started race before grid formation	5	
Ret	8	(Italy) Stefano Modena	Brabham-Judd	0	Accident	7	
Ret	23	(Italy) Pierluigi Martini	Minardi-Ford	0	Accident	11	
DSQ	19	(Italy) Alessandro Nannini	Benetton-Ford	0	Started race before grid formation	13	
Ret	4	(Italy) Michele Alboreto	Tyrrell-Ford	0	Electrical	20	
DNQ	12	(Japan) Satoru Nakajima	Lotus-Judd				
DNQ	29	(France) Yannick Dalmas	Lola-Lamborghini				
DNQ	20	(United Kingdom) Johnny Herbert	Benetton-Ford				
DNQ	26	(France) Olivier Grouillard	Ligier-Ford				
DNPQ	7	(United Kingdom) Martin Brundle	Brabham-Judd				
DNPQ	37	(Belgium) Bertrand Gachot	Onyx-Ford				
DNPQ	33	(Switzerland) Gregor Foitek	EuroBrun-Judd				
DNPQ	18	(Italy) Piercarlo Ghinzani	Osella-Ford				
DNPQ	34	(Germany) Bernd Schneider	Zakspeed-Yamaha				
DNPQ	41	(Germany) Joachim Winkelhock	AGS-Ford				
DNPQ	39	(Germany) Volker Weidler	Rial-Ford				
DNPQ	35	(Japan) Aguri Suzuki	Zakspeed-Yamaha				
DNPQ	32	(France) Pierre-Henri Raphanel	Coloni-Ford				

== Championship standings after the race ==
Drivers' Championship standings

Pos	Driver	Points
1	(France) Alain Prost	29
2	(Brazil) Ayrton Senna	27
3	(Italy) Riccardo Patrese	18
4	(Belgium) Thierry Boutsen	13
5	(United Kingdom) Nigel Mansell	9

Constructors' Championship standings

Pos	Constructor	Points
1	(United Kingdom) McLaren-Honda	56
2	(United Kingdom) Williams-Renault	31
3	(United Kingdom) Benetton-Ford	13
4	(Italy) Ferrari	9
5	(Italy) Dallara-Ford	8

- Note: Only the top five positions are included for both sets of standings.

Previous race: 1989 United States Grand Prix	FIA Formula One World Championship; 1989 season	Next race: 1989 French Grand Prix
Previous race: 1988 Canadian Grand Prix	Canadian Grand Prix	Next race: 1990 Canadian Grand Prix
