= 1989 Belgian Grand Prix =

- Race 11 of 16 in the 1989 Formula One World Championship
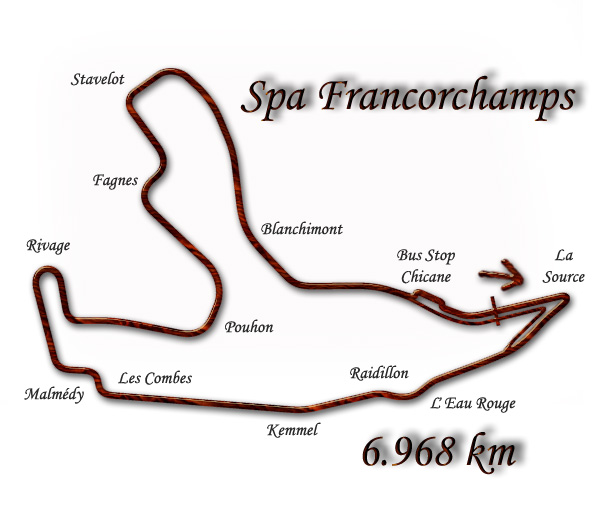

Race details
- Date: 27 August 1989
- Official name: XLVII Grand Prix de Belgique
- Location: Circuit de Spa-Francorchamps; Francorchamps, Wallonia, Belgium
- Course: Permanent racing facility
- Course length: 6.940 km (4.312 miles)
- Distance: 44 laps, 305.360 km (189.741 miles)
- Weather: Wet, cloudy, cool

Pole position
Driver	(Brazil) Ayrton Senna	McLaren-Honda
- Time: 1:50.867

Fastest lap
Driver	(France) Alain Prost	McLaren-Honda
- Time: 2:11.571 on lap 44

Podium
First	(Brazil) Ayrton Senna	McLaren-Honda
Second	(France) Alain Prost	McLaren-Honda
Third	(United Kingdom) Nigel Mansell	Ferrari

The 1989 Belgian Grand Prix was a Formula One motor race held at Spa-Francorchamps on 27 August 1989. It was the eleventh race of the 1989 Formula One World Championship.

The 44-lap race was won from pole position by Brazilian driver Ayrton Senna, driving a McLaren-Honda. Senna finished just ahead of French teammate Alain Prost, with Briton Nigel Mansell third in a Ferrari. The win, Senna's fifth of the season, moved him to within 11 points of Prost in the Drivers' Championship. James Hunt was absent from BBC commentary for this race due to illness, leaving Murray Walker to commentate the majority of the race alone with cameo appearances from Johnny Herbert and Martin Brundle.

== Qualifying ==
=== Pre-qualifying report ===
In the Friday morning pre-qualifying session, an Onyx topped the time sheets for the fifth Grand Prix in succession. Stefan Johansson was again comfortably fastest by over a second, and his team-mate Bertrand Gachot also pre-qualified in third. The other two pre-qualifiers were the Larrousse-Lola cars of Michele Alboreto in second, and Philippe Alliot in fourth.

Those failing to proceed to the main qualifying sessions included both Osellas; Nicola Larini and Piercarlo Ghinzani close together in fifth and sixth. Roberto Moreno was seventh in his Coloni, with the AGS of Gabriele Tarquini eighth. The struggling Zakspeed drivers were ninth and tenth, Bernd Schneider marginally faster than Aguri Suzuki. The other AGS of Yannick Dalmas was next, ahead of Gregor Foitek, driving the older EuroBrun ER188B after the new car had not been successful. Foitek quit the team after this Grand Prix, to be replaced by their 1988 driver Oscar Larrauri. Bottom of the time sheets was the second Coloni of debutant Enrico Bertaggia, who was unable to put a proper timed lap together. He was replacing Pierre-Henri Raphanel, who had left Coloni to join Rial after Volker Weidler had quit the team.

=== Pre-qualifying classification ===
Pos	No	Driver	Constructor	Time	Gap
1	36	(Sweden) Stefan Johansson	Onyx-Ford	1:56.279	—
2	29	(Italy) Michele Alboreto	Lola-Lamborghini	1:57.509	+1.230
3	37	(Belgium) Bertrand Gachot	Onyx-Ford	1:57.720	+1.441
4	30	(France) Philippe Alliot	Lola-Lamborghini	1:57.748	+1.469
5	17	(Italy) Nicola Larini	Osella-Ford	1:58.065	+1.786
6	18	(Italy) Piercarlo Ghinzani	Osella-Ford	1:58.209	+1.930
7	31	(Brazil) Roberto Moreno	Coloni-Ford	1:58.650	+2.371
8	40	(Italy) Gabriele Tarquini	AGS-Ford	1:59.432	+3.153
9	34	(West Germany) Bernd Schneider	Zakspeed-Yamaha	2:00.713	+4.434
10	35	(Japan) Aguri Suzuki	Zakspeed-Yamaha	2:00.757	+4.478
11	41	(France) Yannick Dalmas	AGS-Ford	2:02.205	+5.926
12	33	(Switzerland) Gregor Foitek	EuroBrun-Judd	2:02.767	+6.488
13	32	(Italy) Enrico Bertaggia	Coloni-Ford	2:21.709	+25.430

=== Qualifying report ===
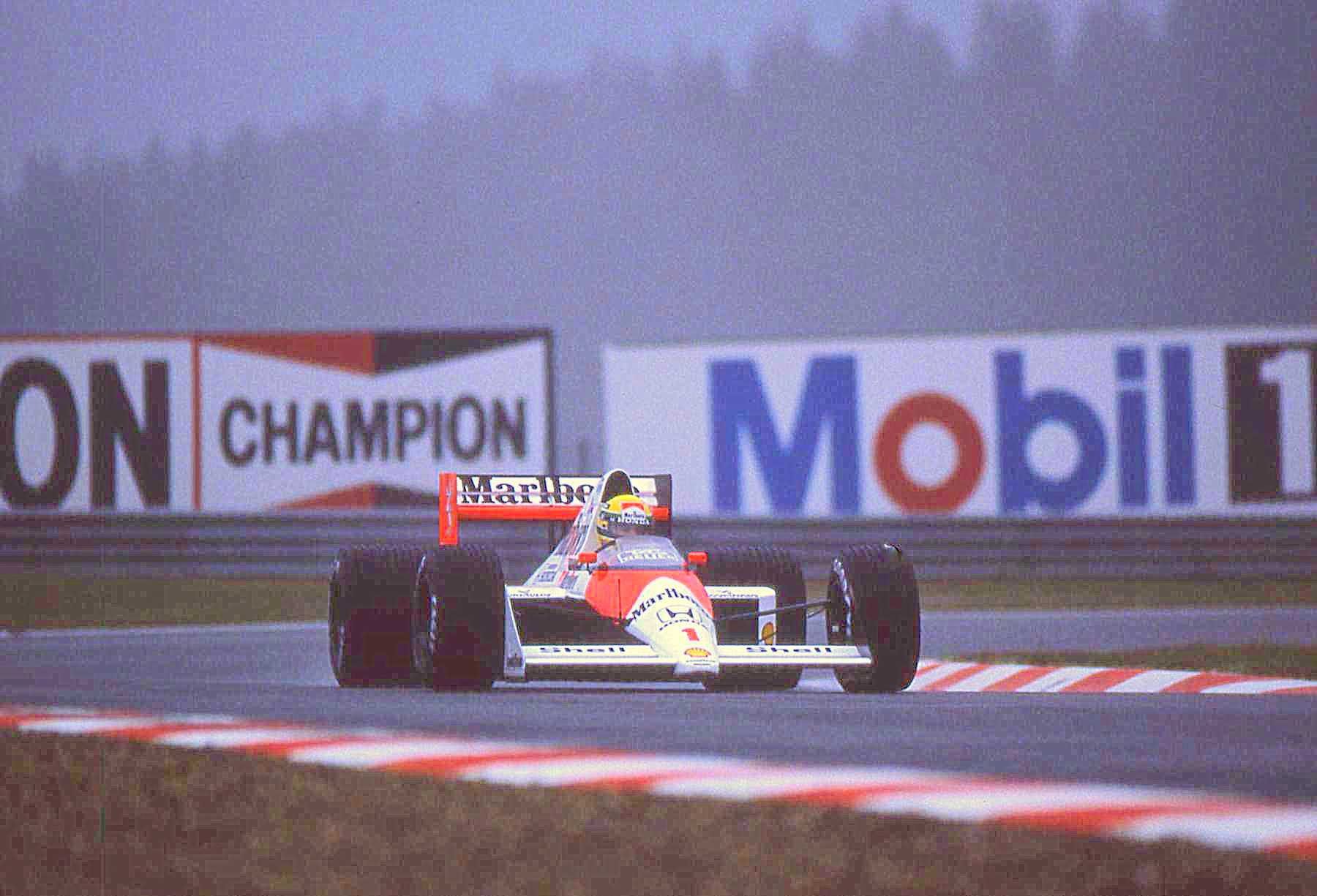
Ayrton Senna gained pole position ahead of his teammate.

Ayrton Senna took his eighth pole position of the season by nearly six-tenths of a second from McLaren teammate Alain Prost, with almost a further second back to Gerhard Berger in the Ferrari in third. The two Williams were fourth and fifth with Thierry Boutsen, in his home race, ahead of Riccardo Patrese, followed by Nigel Mansell in the second Ferrari. Alessandro Nannini was seventh in the Benetton, over two seconds behind Mansell, and the top ten was completed by Stefano Modena in the Brabham, Maurício Gugelmin in the March and Derek Warwick in the Arrows.

The major talking point, however, was the failure of both Nelson Piquet and Satoru Nakajima to qualify, the first time in the Lotus team's history that neither of its cars had qualified.

All the times were determined in the second qualifying session, after the first had taken place in wet conditions.

=== Qualifying classification ===
Pos	No	Driver	Constructor	Q1	Q2	Gap
1	1	(Brazil) Ayrton Senna	McLaren-Honda	2:11.171	1:50.867	—
2	2	(France) Alain Prost	McLaren-Honda	2:12.721	1:51.463	+0.596
3	28	(Austria) Gerhard Berger	Ferrari	2:11.102	1:52.391	+1.524
4	5	(Belgium) Thierry Boutsen	Williams-Renault	2:13.030	1:52.786	+1.919
5	6	(Italy) Riccardo Patrese	Williams-Renault	2:12.581	1:52.875	+2.008
6	27	(United Kingdom) Nigel Mansell	Ferrari	2:12.042	1:52.898	+2.031
7	19	(Italy) Alessandro Nannini	Benetton-Ford	2:14.117	1:55.075	+4.208
8	8	(Italy) Stefano Modena	Brabham-Judd	2:19.161	1:55.642	+4.775
9	15	(Brazil) Maurício Gugelmin	March-Judd	2:16.401	1:55.729	+4.862
10	9	(United Kingdom) Derek Warwick	Arrows-Ford	2:13.005	1:55.864	+4.997
11	30	(France) Philippe Alliot	Lola-Lamborghini	2:14.357	1:55.890	+5.023
12	21	(Italy) Alex Caffi	Dallara-Ford	2:17.604	1:55.892	+5.025
13	20	(Italy) Emanuele Pirro	Benetton-Ford	2:15.068	1:55.902	+5.035
14	23	(Italy) Pierluigi Martini	Minardi-Ford	2:15.515	1:56.115	+5.248
15	36	(Sweden) Stefan Johansson	Onyx-Ford	2:17.329	1:56.129	+5.262
16	4	(United Kingdom) Johnny Herbert	Tyrrell-Ford	2:17.714	1:56.248	+5.381
17	25	(France) René Arnoux	Ligier-Ford	2:14.344	1:56.251	+5.384
18	22	(Italy) Andrea de Cesaris	Dallara-Ford	2:17.512	1:56.257	+5.390
19	16	(Italy) Ivan Capelli	March-Judd	2:15.863	1:56.291	+5.424
20	7	(United Kingdom) Martin Brundle	Brabham-Judd	2:18.663	1:56.327	+5.460
21	3	(United Kingdom) Jonathan Palmer	Tyrrell-Ford	2:18.405	1:56.600	+5.733
22	29	(Italy) Michele Alboreto	Lola-Lamborghini	2:17.240	1:56.616	+5.749
23	37	(Belgium) Bertrand Gachot	Onyx-Ford	2:18.151	1:56.716	+5.849
24	10	(United States) Eddie Cheever	Arrows-Ford	2:14.641	1:56.748	+5.881
25	24	(Spain) Luis Pérez-Sala	Minardi-Ford	2:18.907	1:56.957	+6.090
26	26	(France) Olivier Grouillard	Ligier-Ford	2:18.175	1:57.027	+6.160
27	12	(Japan) Satoru Nakajima	Lotus-Judd	2:13.677	1:57.251	+6.384
28	11	(Brazil) Nelson Piquet	Lotus-Judd	2:14.358	1:57.771	+6.904
29	38	(West Germany) Christian Danner	Rial-Ford	2:20.503	2:00.247	+9.380
30	39	(France) Pierre-Henri Raphanel	Rial-Ford	2:21.180	2:02.937	+12.070

== Race ==
=== Race report ===
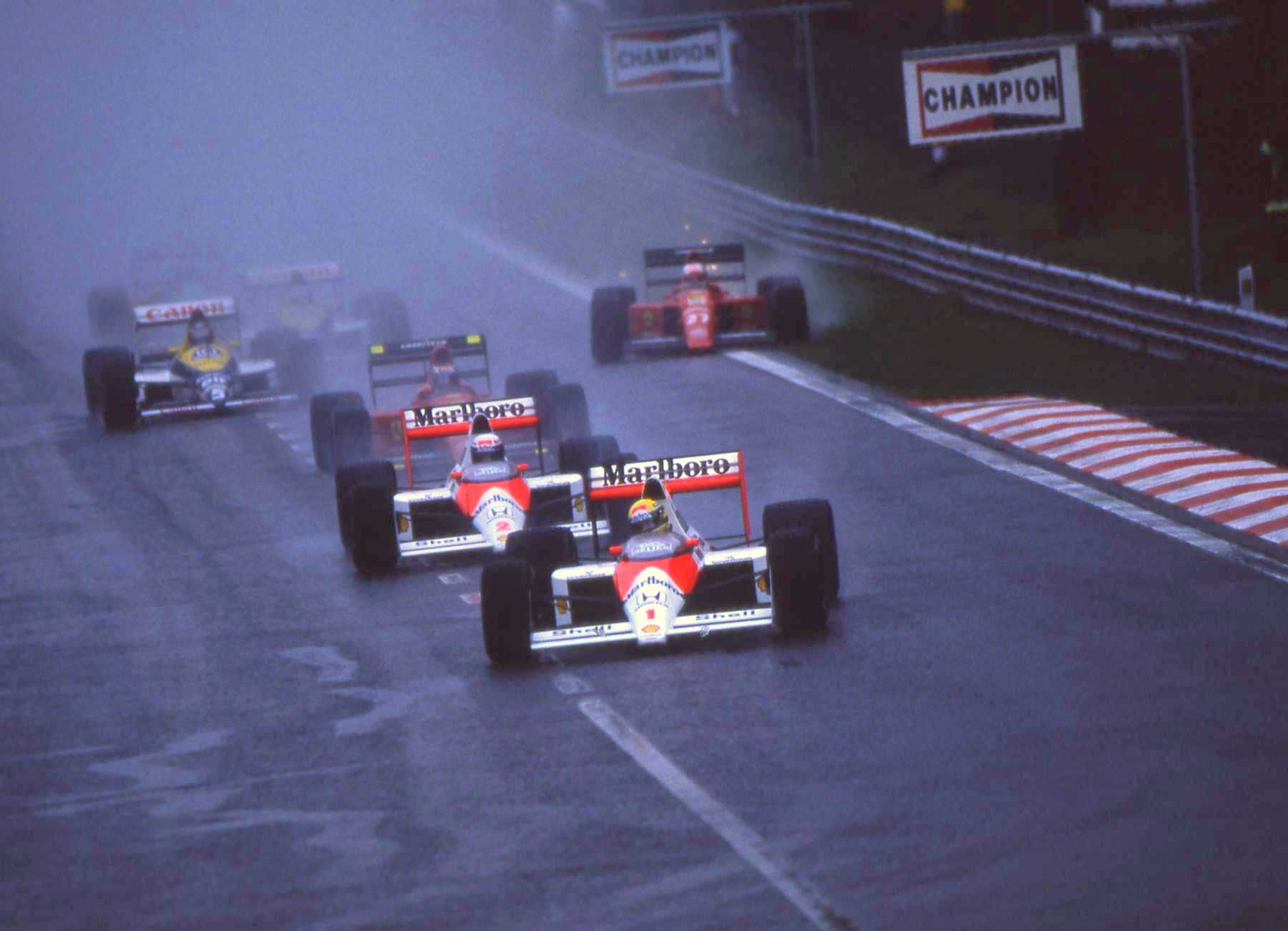
Ayrton Senna ahead of Alain Prost at the race start. Behind, Gerhard Berger, Thierry Boutsen and Nigel Mansell running wide.

The race was delayed for some time due to the wet conditions. At the start, Senna led the way from Prost and Berger. Mansell managed to pass both Williams on the grass on the run to La Source hairpin to claim fourth position by the first corner. Johnny Herbert retired when he spun off on lap 4 in his first race for Tyrrell. René Arnoux then retired in the pit lane on lap 5 after a collision with the Lola of Philippe Alliot at La Source. Early on, Berger pressured Prost but was unable to find a way through. Senna comfortably led from start to finish in conditions similar to those in which he won his first Belgian Grand Prix in 1985. Behind him, Berger suffered his tenth consecutive retirement of the season when he spun out on lap 10, leaving Prost to fend off a charging Mansell who, in his efforts to pass the McLaren, made a number of unorthodox moves at the exit of La Source in an attempt to gain a better run at the McLaren through Eau Rouge and on to the long uphill straight. Senna eased up in the last few laps, allowing Prost and Mansell to finish within two seconds of him. Boutsen finished fourth in his 100th race. Johnny Herbert, in his first race for Tyrrell (replacing Jean Alesi who was busy competing in the F3000 championship), said during the BBC commentary that in order to see the car in front it was necessary to press the helmet visor against the lens of the rear-facing visibility light from the car in front. Unusually, Eddie Cheever received the black and white warning flag for 'unsportsmanlike behaviour' for his alleged baulking of Mansell.

=== Race classification ===
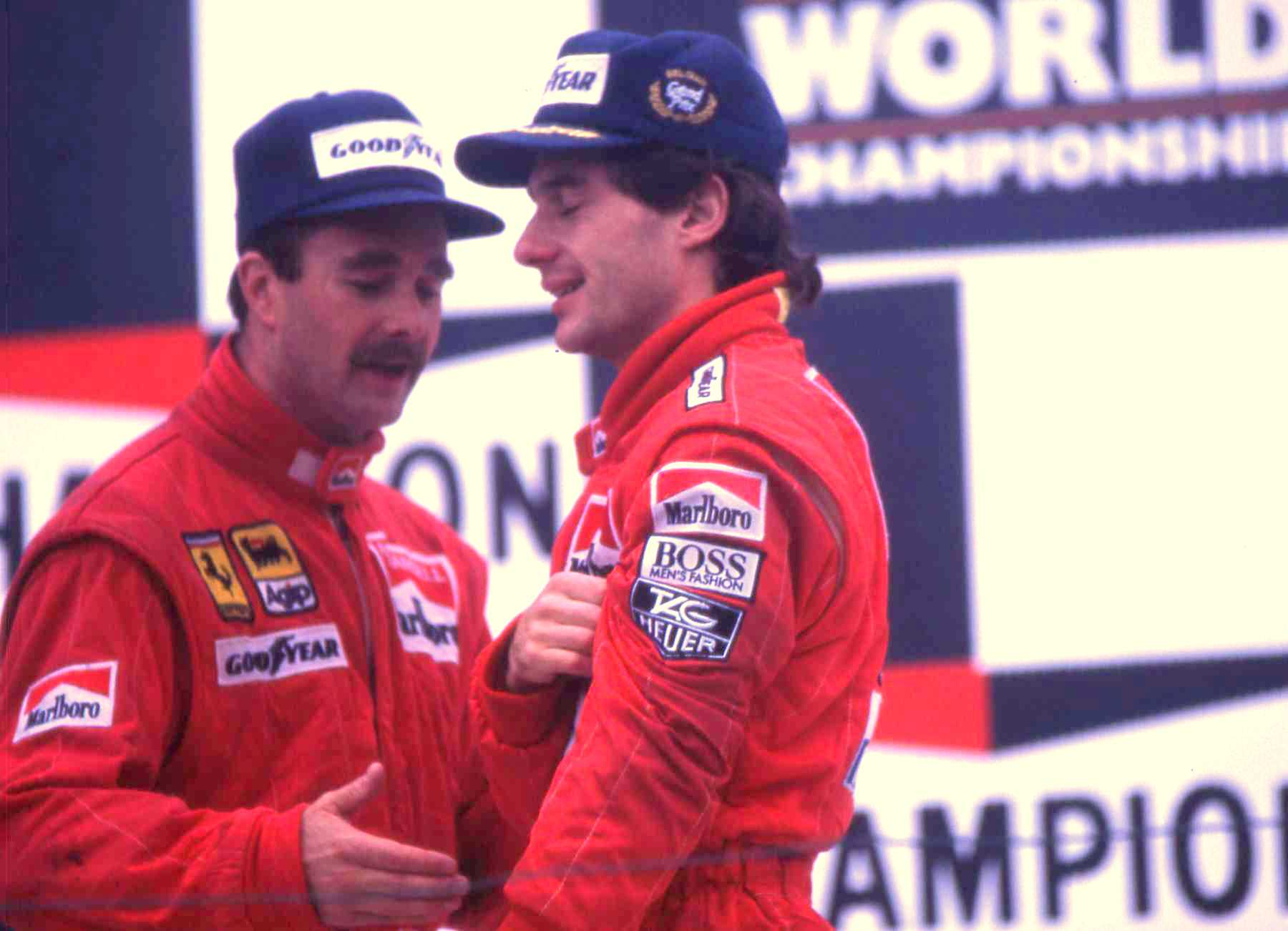
Ayrton Senna and Nigel Mansell at the podium

Pos	No	Driver	Constructor	Laps	Time/Retired	Grid	Points
1	1	(Brazil) Ayrton Senna	McLaren-Honda	44	1:40:54.196	1	9
2	2	(France) Alain Prost	McLaren-Honda	44	+ 1.304	2	6
3	27	(United Kingdom) Nigel Mansell	Ferrari	44	+ 1.824	6	4
4	5	(Belgium) Thierry Boutsen	Williams-Renault	44	+ 54.408	4	3
5	19	(Italy) Alessandro Nannini	Benetton-Ford	44	+ 1:08.805	7	2
6	9	(United Kingdom) Derek Warwick	Arrows-Ford	44	+ 1:18.316	10	1
7	15	(Brazil) Maurício Gugelmin	March-Judd	43	+ 1 lap	9	
8	36	(Sweden) Stefan Johansson	Onyx-Ford	43	+ 1 lap	15	
9	23	(Italy) Pierluigi Martini	Minardi-Ford	43	+ 1 lap	14	
10	20	(Italy) Emanuele Pirro	Benetton-Ford	43	+ 1 lap	13	
11	22	(Italy) Andrea de Cesaris	Dallara-Ford	43	+ 1 lap	18	
12	16	(Italy) Ivan Capelli	March-Judd	43	+ 1 lap	19	
13	26	(France) Olivier Grouillard	Ligier-Ford	43	+ 1 lap	26	
14	3	(United Kingdom) Jonathan Palmer	Tyrrell-Ford	42	+ 2 laps	21	
15	24	(Spain) Luis Pérez-Sala	Minardi-Ford	41	+ 3 laps	25	
16	30	(France) Philippe Alliot	Lola-Lamborghini	39	Engine	11	
Ret	10	(United States) Eddie Cheever	Arrows-Ford	38	Wheel	24	
Ret	37	(Belgium) Bertrand Gachot	Onyx-Ford	21	Spun off	23	
Ret	6	(Italy) Riccardo Patrese	Williams-Renault	20	Collision	5	
Ret	29	(Italy) Michele Alboreto	Lola-Lamborghini	19	Collision	22	
Ret	21	(Italy) Alex Caffi	Dallara-Ford	13	Spun off	12	
Ret	7	(United Kingdom) Martin Brundle	Brabham-Judd	12	Brakes	20	
Ret	28	(Austria) Gerhard Berger	Ferrari	9	Spun off	3	
Ret	8	(Italy) Stefano Modena	Brabham-Judd	9	Handling	8	
Ret	25	(France) René Arnoux	Ligier-Ford	4	Collision damage	17	
Ret	4	(United Kingdom) Johnny Herbert	Tyrrell-Ford	3	Spun off	16	
DNQ	12	(Japan) Satoru Nakajima	Lotus-Judd				
DNQ	11	(Brazil) Nelson Piquet	Lotus-Judd				
DNQ	38	(West Germany) Christian Danner	Rial-Ford				
DNQ	39	(France) Pierre-Henri Raphanel	Rial-Ford				
DNPQ	17	(Italy) Nicola Larini	Osella-Ford				
DNPQ	18	(Italy) Piercarlo Ghinzani	Osella-Ford				
DNPQ	31	(Brazil) Roberto Moreno	Coloni-Ford				
DNPQ	40	(Italy) Gabriele Tarquini	AGS-Ford				
DNPQ	34	(West Germany) Bernd Schneider	Zakspeed-Yamaha				
DNPQ	35	(Japan) Aguri Suzuki	Zakspeed-Yamaha				
DNPQ	41	(France) Yannick Dalmas	AGS-Ford				
DNPQ	33	(Switzerland) Gregor Foitek	EuroBrun-Judd				
DNPQ	32	(Italy) Enrico Bertaggia	Coloni-Ford				

== Championship standings after the race ==
Drivers' Championship standings

Pos	Driver	Points
1	(France) Alain Prost	62
2	(Brazil) Ayrton Senna	51
3	(United Kingdom) Nigel Mansell	38
4	(Italy) Riccardo Patrese	25
5	(Belgium) Thierry Boutsen	20

Constructors' Championship standings

Pos	Constructor	Points
1	(United Kingdom) McLaren-Honda	113
2	(United Kingdom) Williams-Renault	45
3	(Italy) Ferrari	38
4	(United Kingdom) Benetton-Ford	19
5	(United Kingdom) Arrows-Ford	12

- Note: Only the top five positions are included for both sets of standings.

Previous race: 1989 Hungarian Grand Prix	FIA Formula One World Championship; 1989 season	Next race: 1989 Italian Grand Prix
Previous race: 1988 Belgian Grand Prix	Belgian Grand Prix	Next race: 1990 Belgian Grand Prix
