= Leyton House Racing =

Former Formula One constructor

- Full name: Leyton House Formula One Racing Team
- Base: Bicester, Oxfordshire, United Kingdom
- Founder(s): Akira Akagi
- Noted staff: Adrian Newey; Gustav Brunner
- Noted drivers: (Brazil) Maurício Gugelmin (Italy) Ivan Capelli (Austria) Karl Wendlinger

Formula One World Championship career
- First entry: 1990 United States Grand Prix
- Races entered: 32
- Constructors' Championships: 0
- Drivers' Championships: 0
- Race victories: 0 (best finish: 2nd, 1990 French Grand Prix)
- Pole positions: 0 (best grid position: 7th, 1990 French Grand Prix and 1991 Portuguese Grand Prix)
- Fastest laps: 0
- Final entry: 1991 Australian Grand Prix

Leyton House Racing was a Formula One constructor that raced in the 1990 and 1991 seasons.

It was, in essence, a rebranding of the March team which had returned to F1 in 1987. Leyton House, a brand of Japanese real estate company Marusho Kosan, had been the team's marquee sponsor since that year, and went on to buy the team in 1989. Drivers Ivan Capelli and Maurício Gugelmin, who had been with March since 1987 and 1988 respectively, continued with the team under its new guise.

Leyton House also participated in the 1989 Japanese Formula 3 Championship, winning both the Drivers' and Teams' Championship with Masahiko Kageyama, and in the Japanese Formula 3000 from 1986 until 1991.

== Origins ==
In 1986, Akira Akagi's driver Akira Hagiwara died when he crashed a Mercedes 190E touring car during a test session at Sportsland Sugo. Then Akagi went to Imola for the F3000 race, where he met Ivan Capelli's manager Cesare Gariboldi. Akagi wanted to have Capelli driving for him in the 1986 Japanese Formula Two Championship in place of Hagiwara. Capelli finished his partial Japanese season with a third place at Suzuka. Akagi gave Capelli extra prize money for his efforts and he also gave Capelli more money to continue in Europe. With his F3000 car now bearing Leyton House colours, Capelli won the Austrian GP support race on his way to the 1986 International Formula 3000 Championship title. Akagi offered him US$200,000 for a full F2 season in Japan in 1987, but Capelli and Gariboldi told him they were ready to move up to Formula 1 and asked Akagi to sponsor him in F1 for US$4 million instead. Akagi agreed and Gariboldi went to Robin Herd of March Engineering to get a car built for Capelli and have it painted in the Leyton House cyan. Robin Herd recruited Ian Phillips to be the team manager.

== As Leyton House March Racing Team ==
=== 1987 season ===
The initial 1987 March F1 car, the March 87P, was a March 86B F3000 chassis modified to accommodate a bigger fuel tank and with revised aerodynamics, mated with a Ford Cosworth DFZ engine. At the first race, the 1987 Brazilian Grand Prix, March had a team of just 17 people, including Akagi, his girlfriend, his translator and Capelli's father. Engine tuner Heini Mader did not yet have a full-spec Cosworth DFZ ready, so the team used a World Sports Car Championship-spec engine that was not very powerful. On the straights the turbocharged cars were at least 60 mph faster. The car blew its final DFZ engine in the warm up and Capelli did not start the race. The March 871, a proper Formula One car was ready for and introduced in San Marino. Capelli scored his first point at the 1987 Monaco Grand Prix. In the end he finished the season 19th in the Drivers' Championship and 4th in the Jim Clark Trophy.

=== 1988 season ===
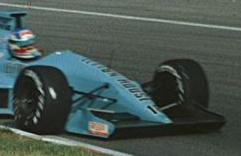
Ivan Capelli driving the March 881 at the 1988 Canadian Grand Prix.

In August 1987, Adrian Newey came to March F1 and designed the March-Judd 881 for Capelli and Maurício Gugelmin to drive. The car was a real success, scoring 22 points in 1988, including a second place at the 1988 Portuguese Grand Prix. It was the only normally aspirated car to lead a race in anger. During the season when Capelli passed the all-powerful McLaren-Honda turbo of Alain Prost on lap 16 during the Japanese Grand Prix (Prost missed a gear out of the chicane which allowed Capelli to lead over the line. Honda power told though as the Judd V8 could not match it for straight line speed). The team discovered later that Ivan had caught the off-switch with his glove and killed the engine.

This was the first time since 1983 that a naturally-aspirated powered car had led a Grand Prix. The aerodynamics and ultra-slim monocoque of the 881 were copied by most of the grid in 1989 and the car launched Newey as a superstar designer.

=== 1989 season ===
In May 1989 the publicly-owned March company sold off its F1 team and the rights to produce F3000 cars to Akagi. The racing team thus became a manufacturer. From a staff of 19 in 1987, the team grew to 120. Cesare Gariboldi died in January following a road accident, thus the team named the chassis with a prefix CG in memory of him. The March CG891 was introduced at the Monaco Grand Prix, the March 881 having served duty for the March Racing Team in the first two races of the year. Gugelmin qualified in 14th while Capelli was 22nd on the grid. Both drivers failed to finish although Capelli was still classified in 11th. This was the Italian's first of only two classified finishes all year, the other coming in Belgium, where he placed 12th. Gugelmin's best finish was seventh, achieved three times; in Belgium, Japan and Australia. Although neither Gugelmin or Capelli scored a points finish with the GC891, the team finished the 1989 Constructors' Championship in 12th, having achieved four points. This was due to Gugelmin's third place with the 881 at the opening race of the year, the Brazilian Grand Prix.

At the French Grand Prix, after a start-line accident forced Gugelmin to use the spare car for the race, he went on to achieve the fastest lap of the race although unclassified at the finish, nine laps behind the winner. The French race had been particularly promising for the team; Capelli had run as high as second at one stage but retired with engine problems.

Many of the March CG891's reliability problems was due to the casing used for the inboard gear cluster; this proved to have some flex and resulted in some gearbox failures in the first part of the season until the walls of the casing were made thicker. Some other failures were due to the electrical paraphernalia of the Judd EV, with only the odd piston and valvegear issues.

== As Leyton House Racing ==
=== 1990 season ===
For the 1990 season, the team used the CG901 chassis, designed by Adrian Newey and powered by a Judd V8 engine. There was an aerodynamic issue with the Southampton wind tunnel, causing the team to struggle: the first six races of the year saw both Capelli and Gugelmin fail to qualify in Brazil and Mexico, while Gugelmin also missed out in Monaco and Canada. Newey was fired as a result, but not before making changes to the car which would result in a remarkable turnaround at the French Grand Prix. There, Capelli and Gugelmin qualified seventh and tenth respectively, before running first and second for much of the race, largely due to the team's decision not to pit for tyres. Gugelmin eventually retired with an engine failure, but Capelli continued to lead from Alain Prost in the Ferrari until three laps from home, when a misfire forced him to let the Frenchman past; second place was still a popular result.

The improved showings continued over the next few races: Capelli ran third in Britain before his fuel pipe broke, then finished just outside the points in seventh in Germany. Gugelmin finished eighth in Hungary, then scored a point for sixth in Belgium, finishing just ahead of Capelli. Thereafter, however, the season petered out.

Off track, at the Brazilian GP Ian Phillips had been taken ill with meningitis. Leyton House was also running into financial problems. Akagi was reducing the budget constantly and brought in an accountant, Simon Keeble. When Ian Phillips had meningitis Keeble suddenly assumed power. Keeble and Adrian Newey fell out in a big way. Newey already had an offer from Williams and, encouraged by Ian Phillips, accepted it. Phillips made his return at the Hungarian GP, but at the end of the year accepted an offer to join the new Jordan F1 team for 1991. Team manager Harry Mandel also resigned, while Newey was replaced as technical director by Gustav Brunner. Several other engineers, brought over from March, also departed that year.

Capelli's six points from France gave him equal 10th in the Drivers' Championship, while Gugelmin's point from Belgium placed him 18th. The team originally finished seventh in the Constructors' Championship, but were later promoted to sixth when the Larrousse team were disqualified for declaring the Lola chassis they had used to be their own.

=== 1991 season ===
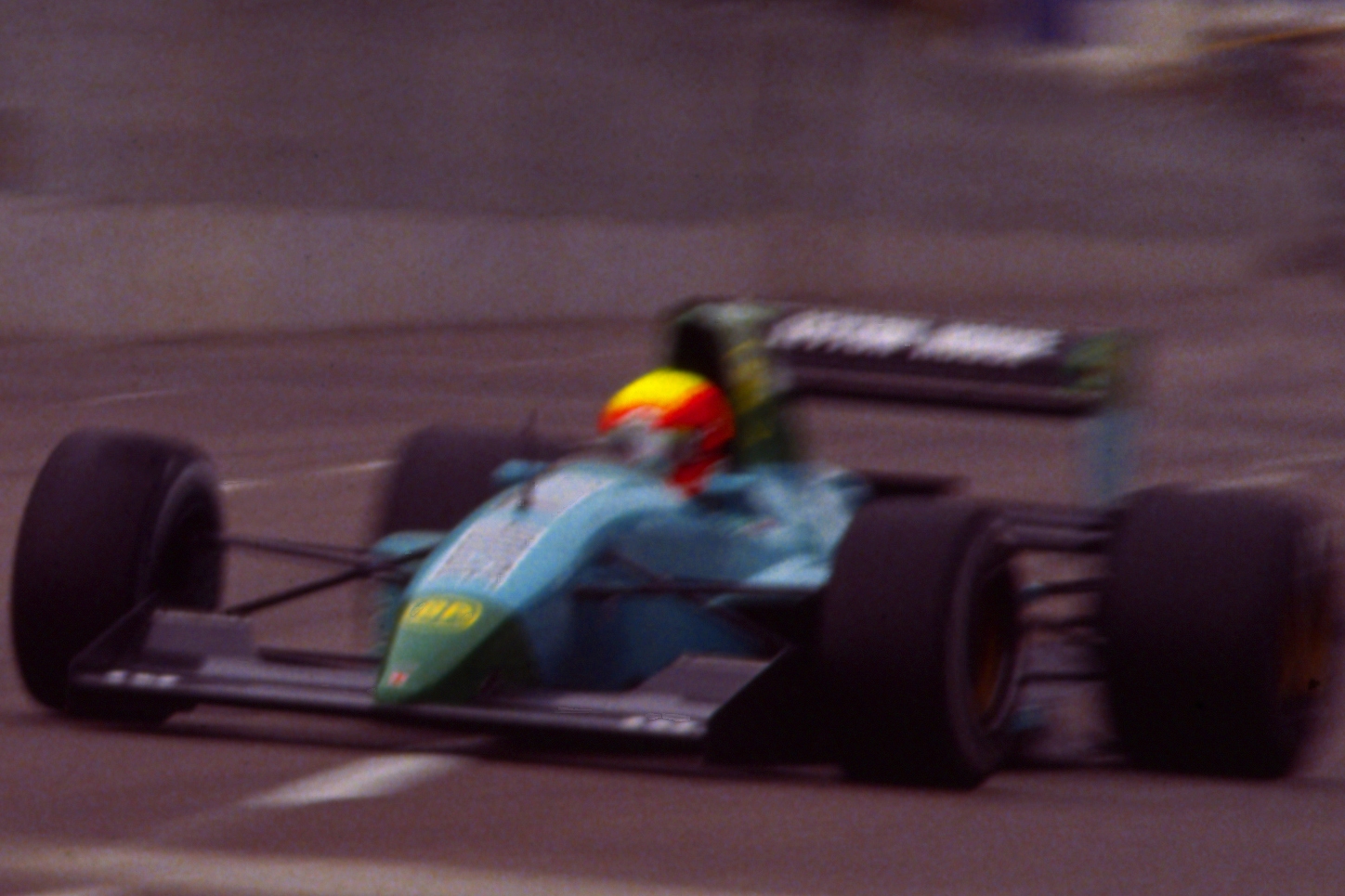
Maurício Gugelmin driving the Leyton House CG911 at the 1991 United States Grand Prix.

For 1991, Brunner and Chris Murphy designed the CG911 chassis, while the team switched from the Judd V8 engine to the new Ilmor V10. As in 1990, the team struggled early on in the season: Capelli retired from the first nine races despite running in the top six in San Marino and Canada; Gugelmin also struggled to finish during this period but did manage seventh in France. A steady drive in Hungary brought Capelli and the team a point for sixth; the Italian driver then ran in the top six again in Portugal before spinning off. Gugelmin, meanwhile, finished the last five races, recording two more seventh places in Portugal and Spain.

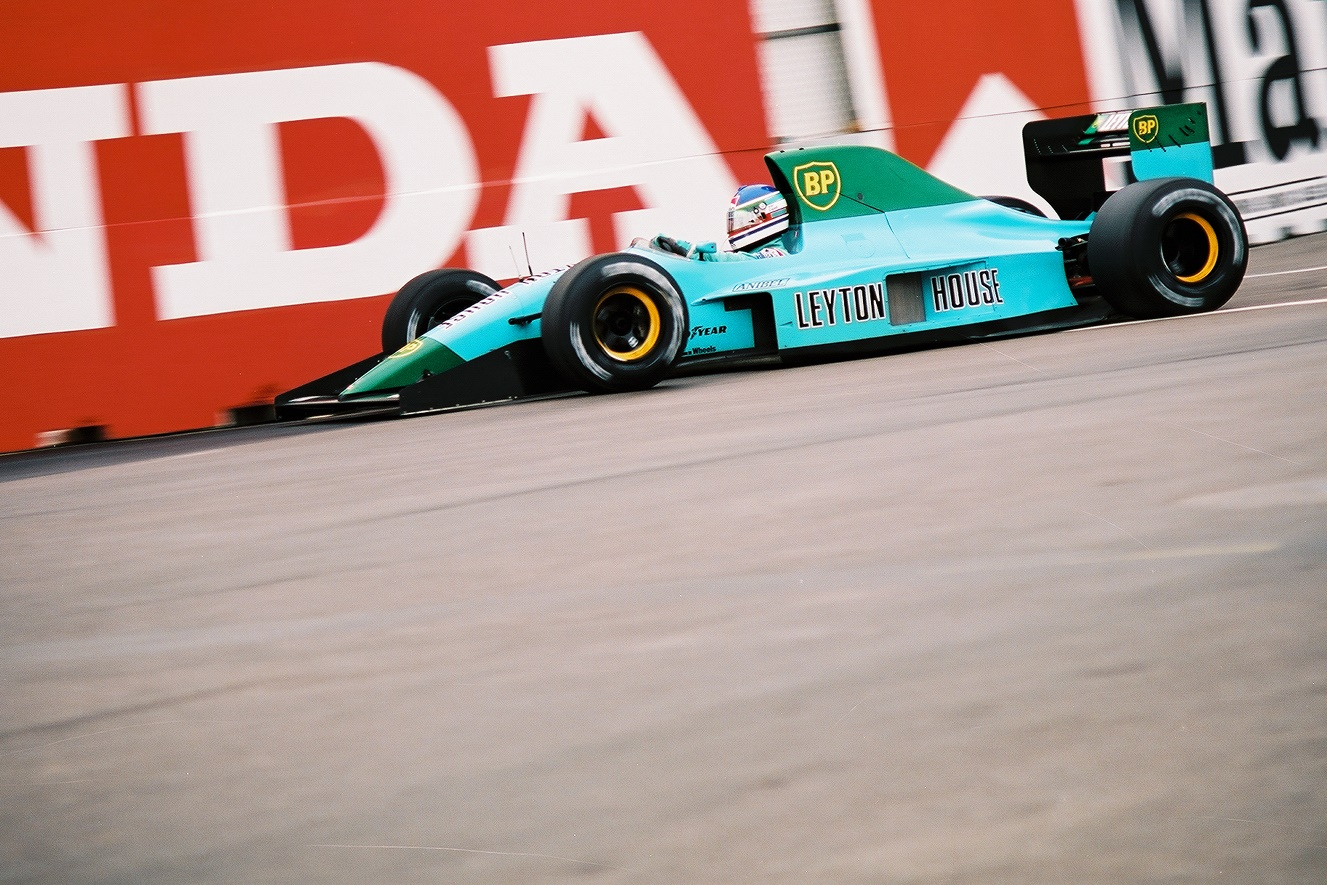
Ivan Capelli driving the CG911 at the 1991 United States Grand Prix.

In September 1991, team owner Akira Akagi was implicated in a financial scandal involving his company, Marusho Kosan (丸晶興産, Marusho Kōsan) and the Fuji Bank and was arrested. Akagi's associate Ken Marrable took over the running of the team, but money was now short. With two races remaining, Capelli stepped down to make way for Karl Wendlinger. At the time, Wendlinger was competing in the World Sportscar Championship for Sauber-Mercedes; in this context, it is notable that the Ilmor V10 was used by Sauber when they made their F1 debut two years later (with Wendlinger one of the drivers) and that Ilmor became the F1 engine manufacturing arm of Mercedes-Benz.

The point from Hungary placed Capelli 20th in the Drivers' Championship, and the team 12th in the Constructors' Championship. For 1992, Capelli would sign for Ferrari while Gugelmin left for Jordan.

== Later ==
The team was sold to a consortium including Marrable, Brunner, lawyer John Byfield and Dutch motorsport businessman Henny Vollenberg. For the 1992 season it reverted to the March name, perhaps in an effort to distance itself from the controversy surrounding Akagi and the Leyton House company. Wendlinger stayed on, joined by Paul Belmondo; the Austrian driver finished fourth in Canada. However, money remained tight and Belmondo was eventually replaced by Emanuele Naspetti, while Wendlinger made way for Jan Lammers, a friend of Vollenberg, returning to F1 after a ten-year absence.

Attempts to sell the team during the winter of 1992 failed and despite nominating Lammers and Jean-Marc Gounon to drive in 1993, there was not enough money and the team folded in early 1993.

On 8 August 2018 founder Akira Akagi died.

== Complete Formula One results ==
(key)

| Year | Chassis | Engine | Tyres | No. | Drivers | 1 | 2 | 3 | 4 | 5 | 6 | 7 | 8 | 9 | 10 | 11 | 12 | 13 | 14 | 15 | 16 | Points | WCC |
As "Leyton House March Racing Team"
| 1987 | 87P; 871 | Ford Cosworth DFZ 3.5 V8 | G | | | BRA | SMR | BEL | MON | DET | FRA | GBR | GER | HUN | AUT | ITA | POR | ESP | MEX | JPN | AUS | 1 | 13th |
| 1987 | 87P; 871 | Ford Cosworth DFZ 3.5 V8 | G | 16 | (Italy) Ivan Capelli | DNS | Ret | Ret | 6 | Ret | Ret | Ret | Ret | 10 | 11 | 13 | 9 | 12 | Ret | Ret | Ret | 1 | 13th |
| 1988 | 881 | Judd CV 3.5 V8 | G | | | BRA | SMR | MON | MEX | CAN | DET | FRA | GBR | GER | HUN | BEL | ITA | POR | ESP | JPN | AUS | 22 | 6th |
| 1988 | 881 | Judd CV 3.5 V8 | G | 16 | (Italy) Ivan Capelli | Ret | Ret | 10 | 16 | 5 | DNS | 9 | Ret | 5 | Ret | 3 | 5 | 2 | Ret | Ret | 6 | 22 | 6th |
| 1988 | 881 | Judd CV 3.5 V8 | G | 15 | (Brazil) Maurício Gugelmin | Ret | 15 | Ret | Ret | Ret | Ret | 8 | 4 | 8 | 5 | Ret | 8 | Ret | 7 | 10 | Ret | 22 | 6th |
| 1989 | CG891; 881 | Judd CV 3.5 V8; Judd EV 3.5 V8 | G | | | BRA | SMR | MON | MEX | USA | CAN | FRA | GBR | GER | HUN | BEL | ITA | POR | ESP | JPN | AUS | 4 | 12th |
| 1989 | CG891; 881 | Judd CV 3.5 V8; Judd EV 3.5 V8 | G | 16 | (Italy) Ivan Capelli | Ret | Ret | 11^{†} | Ret | Ret | Ret | Ret | Ret | Ret | Ret | 12 | Ret | Ret | Ret | Ret | Ret | 4 | 12th |
| 1989 | CG891; 881 | Judd CV 3.5 V8; Judd EV 3.5 V8 | G | 15 | (Brazil) Maurício Gugelmin | 3 | Ret | Ret | DNQ | DSQ | Ret | NC^{F} | Ret | Ret | Ret | 7 | Ret | 10 | Ret | 7 | 7 | 4 | 12th |
As "Leyton House Racing"
| 1990 | CG901 | Judd EV 3.5 V8 | G | | | USA | BRA | SMR | MON | CAN | MEX | FRA | GBR | GER | HUN | BEL | ITA | POR | ESP | JPN | AUS | 7 | 7th |
| 1990 | CG901 | Judd EV 3.5 V8 | G | 15 | (Brazil) Maurício Gugelmin | 14 | DNQ | Ret | DNQ | DNQ | DNQ | Ret | DNS | Ret | 8 | 6 | Ret | 12 | 8 | Ret | Ret | 7 | 7th |
| 1990 | CG901 | Judd EV 3.5 V8 | G | 16 | (Italy) Ivan Capelli | Ret | DNQ | Ret | Ret | 10 | DNQ | 2 | Ret | 7 | Ret | 7 | Ret | Ret | Ret | Ret | Ret | 7 | 7th |
| 1991 | CG911 | Ilmor 2175A 3.5 V10 | G | | | USA | BRA | SMR | MON | CAN | MEX | FRA | GBR | GER | HUN | BEL | ITA | POR | ESP | JPN | AUS | 1 | 12th |
| 1991 | CG911 | Ilmor 2175A 3.5 V10 | G | 15 | (Brazil) Maurício Gugelmin | Ret | Ret | 12 | Ret | Ret | Ret | 7 | Ret | Ret | 11 | Ret | 15 | 7 | 7 | 8 | 14 | 1 | 12th |
| 1991 | CG911 | Ilmor 2175A 3.5 V10 | G | 16 | (Italy) Ivan Capelli | Ret | Ret | Ret | Ret | Ret | Ret | Ret | Ret | Ret | 6 | Ret | 8 | 17 | Ret | | | 1 | 12th |
| 1991 | CG911 | Ilmor 2175A 3.5 V10 | G | 16 | (Austria) Karl Wendlinger | | | | | | | | | | | | | | | Ret | 20 | 1 | 12th |
