= Leyton House CG911 =

1991 Formula One racing car

Leyton House CG911 March CG911B March CG911C
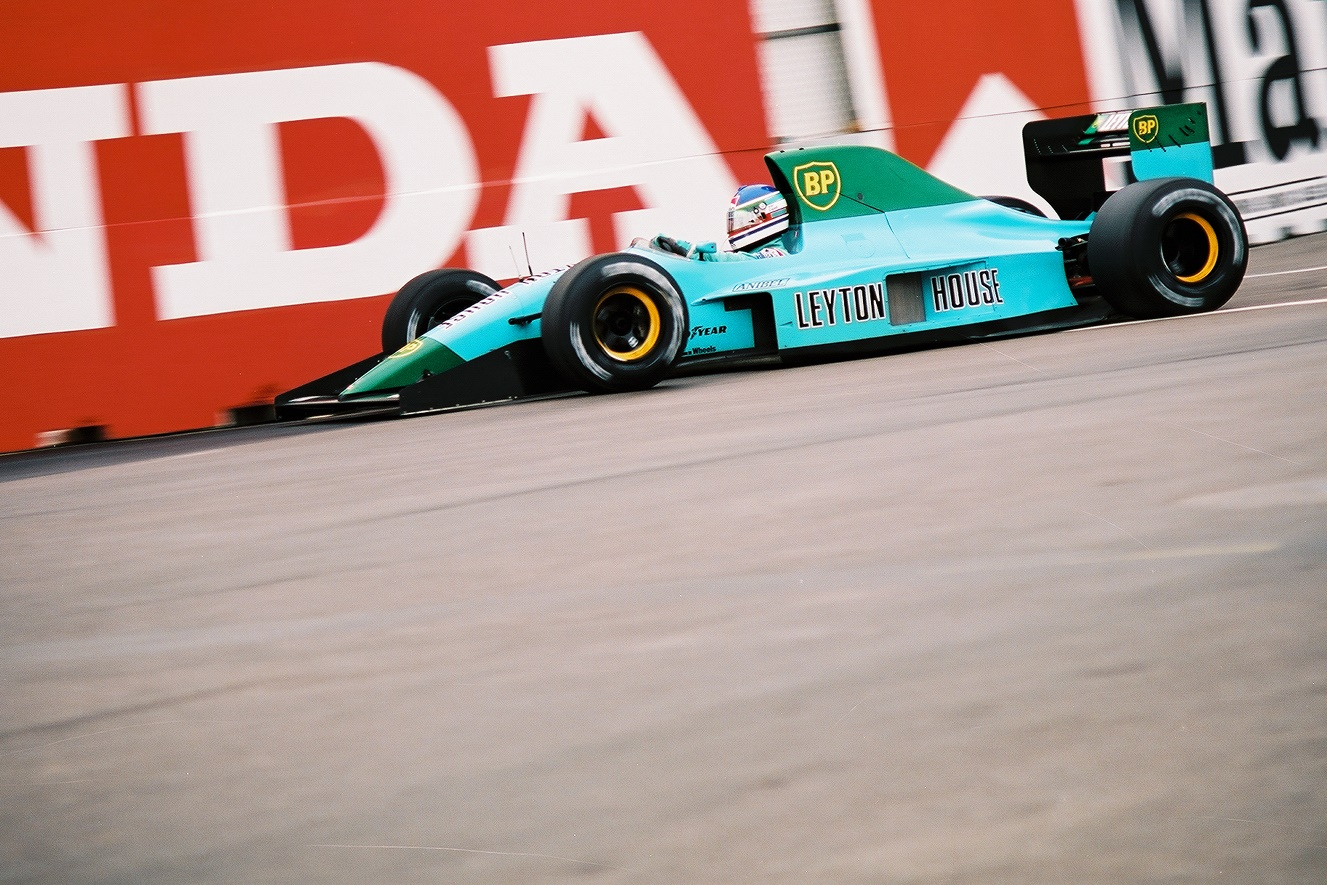
- Ivan Capelli driving the CG911 at the 1991 United States Grand Prix
- Category: Formula One
- Constructor: Leyton House/March
- Designers: Chris Murphy (design director); Gustav Brunner (technical director)
- Predecessor: Leyton House CG901

Technical specifications
- Chassis: Carbon fibre monocoque
- Suspension (front): Pushrods
- Suspension (rear): Pushrods
- Axle track: 1,780 mm (70.1 in)/1,650 mm (65.0 in) front/rear
- Wheelbase: 2,790 mm (109.8 in)
- Engine: Ilmor 2175A 3,479 cc (212.3 cu in) 72° V10 naturally-aspirated mid-engine, longitudinally mounted
- Transmission: 6-speed semi-automatic
- Weight: 505 kg (1,113 lb)
- Fuel: BP
- Tyres: Goodyear

Competition history
- Notable entrants: Leyton House Racing; March F1 (1992)
- Notable drivers: 15. (Brazil) Maurício Gugelmin; 16. (Italy) Ivan Capelli; 16. (Austria) Karl Wendlinger; 16. (Netherlands) Jan Lammers; 17. (France) Paul Belmondo; 17. (Italy) Emanuele Naspetti
- Debut: 1991 United States Grand Prix
- Last event: 1992 Australian Grand Prix
Entries	Races	Wins	Podiums
33	32	0	0
Poles	F/Laps		
0	0		

The Leyton House CG911 was a Formula One racing car designed by Chris Murphy and Gustav Brunner for the 1991 Formula One season. Unlike its CG901 predecessor, which used a Judd EV V8 engine, the CG911 used an Ilmor 2175A V10 engine. Leyton House Racing initially started the 1991 season with Maurício Gugelmin and Ivan Capelli as their drivers, as they had in 1990, but Karl Wendlinger replaced Capelli for the final two races of the season. For 1992, when Leyton House renamed themselves as March F1, the CG911 was updated to the March CG911B specification, with Wendlinger, Jan Lammers, Paul Belmondo and Emanuele Naspetti all sharing driving duties.

Although March initially intended to run the CG911C in 1993 with Lammers and Jean-Marc Gounon, the team folded and they did not compete that year.

== Design ==
The Leyton House CG911 was developed by Chris Murphy and Gustav Brunner for the 1991 Formula One season. The CG911 was the first Formula One car to use an Ilmor-developed engine, after Akira Akagi formed a partnership between Ilmor and Leyton House Racing. This engine, the 2175A (also known as the LH10), was a V10 engine that had initially been developed in 1989 in response to the banning of turbocharged cars in Formula One at the end of the previous season. It was a 72-degree V10 that was developed to be as compact and light as possible; it was 593 mm (23.3 in) long, whilst the Honda RA109E V12 and Renault RS1 V10s of 1989 had lengths of 620 and 668 mm (24.4 and 26.3 in) respectively, and it weighed 126 kg (278 lb). The CG911 was updated to the CG911B specification after Leyton House were renamed as March F1 in 1992, and a CG911C specification car was entered in 1993, but never raced.

== Racing history ==
=== 1991 ===
Leyton House started the 1991 season with Maurício Gugelmin and Ivan Capelli. The CG911 did not have a successful debut at the 1991 United States Grand Prix; both cars had retired by lap 40 with gearbox trouble. In fact, it would not be until the seventh race (the 1991 French Grand Prix) of the season that Leyton House finished a race; Gugelmin took seventh place, whilst Capelli crashed out of the race after colliding with the Minardi of Gianni Morbidelli. It was the unreliability of the Ilmor engine that caused most of the team's problems; by the French Grand Prix, six of the retirements had been caused by engine failure. After two more races with double retirements, the CG911's best result of the season came at the 1991 Hungarian Grand Prix; not only did both cars finish, but Capelli was able to take sixth place, one lap behind the leader. Double engine failure followed at the 1991 Belgian Grand Prix, but both CG911s finished at the 1991 Italian Grand Prix, albeit out of the points (Capelli, in eighth, was the highest-placed of the two drivers). Gugelmin followed this with seventh place at both the 1991 Portuguese Grand Prix and the 1991 Spanish Grand Prix. However, Akagi was arrested in connection with the Fuji Bank scandal, and, needing the funds to keep going, Leyton House replaced Capelli with Karl Wendlinger for the 1991 Japanese Grand Prix, who brought backing from Mercedes-Benz. Although Wendlinger had an unsuccessful debut for the team, as he was taken out by Andrea de Cesaris's Jordan (as were both the Dallaras of JJ Lehto and Emanuele Pirro), Gugelmin continued his run of finishes with an eighth place. Leyton House finished the season on a sour note at the 1991 Australian Grand Prix; Gugelmin crashed in the pit lane on lap 13 due to heavy rain, injuring two marshalls in the process, and Wendlinger was running dead-last in 20th, two laps down, when the race was stopped on lap 14. Leyton House thus finished the season 12th, and last of the classified teams, in the Constructors' Championship, whilst Capelli finished 20th in the Drivers' Championship.

=== 1992 ===
For the 1992 season, Leyton House were rebranded as March F1, after they were sold to a consortium led by Ken Marrable, John Byfield, Tony Birchfield, Gustav Brunner and Henny Vollenberg. Capelli left for Ferrari and was permanently replaced by Wendlinger, whilst Gugelmin switched to Jordan and was replaced by Paul Belmondo. March were no longer the only team running the Ilmor engine; Tyrrell's 020 also used the 2175A V10. However, the 1992 season did not start well for March, as Wendlinger retired from the 1992 South African Grand Prix with an overheating engine after 13 laps, and Belmondo failed to qualify. Wendlinger also retired from both of the following races, whilst Belmondo failed to qualify for either race. The 1992 Spanish Grand Prix, by contrast, was extremely successful; both drivers finished the race, with Wendlinger taking eighth, and Belmondo twelfth (albeit last of the finishers). Both cars finished the 1992 San Marino Grand Prix, but Wendlinger in twelfth and Belmondo in thirteenth were the last of the finishers. The 1992 Monaco Grand Prix was one to forget for the team; not only did Belmondo fail to qualify, but Wendlinger retired due to gearbox failure on the first lap. Both cars finished the 1992 Canadian Grand Prix, and Wendlinger took fourth, ten places ahead of Belmondo. After Wendlinger suffered gearbox failure and Belmondo failed to qualify at both the 1992 French Grand Prix and 1992 British Grand Prix, both cars finished the 1992 German Grand Prix; this time, Wendlinger was the one at the back of the field, in 16th, whilst Belmondo took 13th. Belmondo followed up with ninth at the 1992 Hungarian Grand Prix, in what would prove to be his last race with March. By now, March's money was beginning to run out, and Belmondo was replaced by Uliveto-backed Emanuele Naspetti. This appeared to pay off, as Wendlinger led Naspetti home in 11th. Wendlinger followed this with tenth at the 1992 Italian Grand Prix, whilst Naspetti was eleventh at the 1992 Portuguese Grand Prix. This was Wendlinger's last race for the team; he was replaced by veteran racer Jan Lammers for the 1992 Japanese Grand Prix, where Naspetti finished 13th. Lammers finished the season at the 1992 Australian Grand Prix by taking 12th place. Wendlinger's three points from the Canadian Grand Prix secured himself 12th in the Drivers' Championship, and March took ninth in the Constructors' standings.

=== 1993 ===
March F1 were in major financial trouble prior to the start of the 1993 season, and an attempt at doing a deal with a Swiss firm did not amount to anything. They entered the 1993 South African Grand Prix with Lammers and Jean-Marc Gounon, but did not compete; although their cars arrived at the Kyalami circuit, the engines did not. Out of money, March folded soon after, and did not compete in Formula One again.

== Complete Formula One results ==
(key) (results shown in bold indicate pole position; results in italics indicate fastest lap)

Year	Entrant	Chassis	Engine	Tyres	Driver	1	2	3	4	5	6	7	8	9	10	11	12	13	14	15	16	Pts.	WCC
1991	Leyton House Racing	Leyton House CG911	Ilmor 2175A; V10	G		USA	BRA	SMR	MON	CAN	MEX	FRA	GBR	GER	HUN	BEL	ITA	POR	ESP	JPN	AUS	1	12th
1991	Leyton House Racing	Leyton House CG911	Ilmor 2175A; V10	G	Maurício Gugelmin	Ret	Ret	12	Ret	Ret	Ret	7	Ret	Ret	11	Ret	15	7	7	8	14	1	12th
1991	Leyton House Racing	Leyton House CG911	Ilmor 2175A; V10	G	Ivan Capelli	Ret	Ret	Ret	Ret	Ret	Ret	Ret	Ret	Ret	6	Ret	8	17	Ret			1	12th
1991	Leyton House Racing	Leyton House CG911	Ilmor 2175A; V10	G	Karl Wendlinger															Ret	20	1	12th
1992	March F1	March CG911B	Ilmor 2175A; V10	G		RSA	MEX	BRA	ESP	SMR	MON	CAN	FRA	GBR	GER	HUN	BEL	ITA	POR	JPN	AUS	3	9th
1992	March F1	March CG911B	Ilmor 2175A; V10	G	Karl Wendlinger	Ret	Ret	Ret	8	12	Ret	4	Ret	Ret	16	Ret	11	10	Ret			3	9th
1992	March F1	March CG911B	Ilmor 2175A; V10	G	Jan Lammers															Ret	12	3	9th
1992	March F1	March CG911B	Ilmor 2175A; V10	G	Paul Belmondo	DNQ	DNQ	DNQ	12	13	DNQ	14	DNQ	DNQ	13	9						3	9th
1992	March F1	March CG911B	Ilmor 2175A; V10	G	Emanuele Naspetti												12	Ret	11	13	Ret	3	9th
