= March 881 =

- Category: Formula One
- Constructor: March Engineering
- Designer: Adrian Newey
- Predecessor: 871
- Successor: CG891

Technical specifications
- Chassis: Carbon fibre monocoque
- Suspension (front): Double wishbones, pushrods
- Suspension (rear): Double wishbones, pullrods
- Axle track: Front: 1,778 mm (70.0 in); Rear: 1,676 mm (66.0 in)
- Wheelbase: 2,855 mm (112.4 in)
- Engine: Judd CV, 3,496 cc (213.3 cu in), 90° V8, NA, mid-engine, longitudinally mounted,
- Transmission: March 6-speed manual
- Weight: 500 kg (1,100 lb)
- Fuel: Mobil; BP
- Tyres: Goodyear

Competition history
- Notable entrants: Leyton House March Racing Team
- Notable drivers: 15. (Brazil) Maurício Gugelmin; 16. (Italy) Ivan Capelli
- Debut: 1988 Brazilian Grand Prix
| Races | Wins | Poles | F/Laps |
|---|---|---|---|
| 18 | 0 | 0 | 0 |
- Constructors' Championships: 0
- Drivers' Championships: 0

The March 881 was a Formula One racing car designed by Adrian Newey, his first ever Formula One car, and raced by March Racing Team in the 1988 season by Italian Ivan Capelli and the debuting Maurício Gugelmin from Brazil. The car's best result was a second place driven by Capelli at the 1988 Portuguese Grand Prix.

== 1988 ==
The March 881 used the then new to Formula One Judd V8 engine, and was consistently the fastest speed trapped atmo car of the 1988 season, with Capelli clocked at a class fastest 312 km/h (194 mph) on the first straight at Hockenheim for the German Grand Prix. Capelli and his March 881 was the only non-turbo car/driver combination in 1988 to actually lead a Grand Prix when he briefly took the lead from Alain Prost in his McLaren-Honda as they crossed the start-finish line on lap 16 of the Japanese Grand Prix at Suzuka. This was also the first time since the 1983 season that a naturally aspirated car had led a Formula One Grand Prix.

Capelli finished the season in 7th place with 17 points, while Gugelmin generally impressed most by finishing his debut season in 13th place with 5 points. March finished the year 6th in the Constructors' Championship with 22 points.

== 1989 ==
With the 1989 car, the CG891, only being completed in time for the Monaco Grand Prix, the team were forced to use the 881 for the first two races of the year, in Brazil and San Marino. Gugelmin drove the 881 to third place at his home race in Brazil, close behind the Ferrari of Nigel Mansell and the McLaren-Honda of Prost. However, these would turn out to be the team's only points of 1989, as the CG891 was off the pace and unreliable.

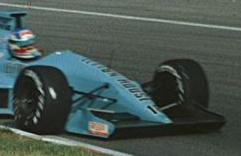
Ivan Capelli driving the March 881 at the 1988 Canadian Grand Prix.

== Complete Formula One results ==
(key)

| Year | Team | Engine | Tyres | Drivers | 1 | 2 | 3 | 4 | 5 | 6 | 7 | 8 | 9 | 10 | 11 | 12 | 13 | 14 | 15 | 16 | Pts. | WCC |
|---|---|---|---|---|---|---|---|---|---|---|---|---|---|---|---|---|---|---|---|---|---|---|
| 1988 | Leyton House; March Racing Team | Judd CV; V8 | G | | BRA | SMR | MON | MEX | CAN | DET | FRA | GBR | GER | HUN | BEL | ITA | POR | ESP | JPN | AUS | 22 | 6th |
| 1988 | Leyton House; March Racing Team | Judd CV; V8 | G | Maurício Gugelmin | Ret | 15 | Ret | Ret | Ret | Ret | 8 | 4 | 8 | 5 | Ret | 8 | Ret | 7 | 10 | Ret | 22 | 6th |
| 1988 | Leyton House; March Racing Team | Judd CV; V8 | G | Ivan Capelli | Ret | Ret | 10 | 16 | 5 | DNS | 9 | Ret | 5 | Ret | 3 | 5 | 2 | Ret | Ret | 6 | 22 | 6th |
| 1989 | Leyton House; March Racing Team | Judd CV; V8 | G | | BRA | SMR | MON | MEX | USA | CAN | FRA | GBR | GER | HUN | BEL | ITA | POR | ESP | JPN | AUS | 4* | 12th |
| 1989 | Leyton House; March Racing Team | Judd CV; V8 | G | Maurício Gugelmin | 3 | Ret | | | | | | | | | | | | | | | 4* | 12th |
| 1989 | Leyton House; March Racing Team | Judd CV; V8 | G | Ivan Capelli | Ret | Ret | | | | | | | | | | | | | | | 4* | 12th |

* All 4 points in 1989 scored using the March 881.
