= March 871 =

- Category: Formula One
- Constructor: March Engineering
- Designers: Gordon Coppuck; Tim Holloway
- Predecessor: 87P
- Successor: 881

Technical specifications
- Chassis: Carbon fibre monocoque
- Suspension (front): Inboard coil springs, pull-rods and double wishbones
- Suspension (rear): Inboard coil springs, pull-rods and double wishbones
- Engine: Cosworth DFZ, 3,494 cc (213.2 cu in), 90° V8, NA, mid-engine, longitudinally mounted
- Transmission: March 6-speed manual
- Fuel: Shell
- Tyres: Goodyear

Competition history
- Notable entrants: Leyton House March Racing Team
- Notable drivers: 16. (Italy) Ivan Capelli
- Debut: 1987 San Marino Grand Prix
Races	Wins	Poles	F/Laps
15	0	0	0
- Constructors' Championships: 0
- Drivers' Championships: 0

The March 871 was a Formula One racing car designed by the March Racing Team and driven in the 1987 Formula One season. The car was powered by a Cosworth DFZ V8 engine, and was driven by the 1986 International Formula 3000 champion, Italian Ivan Capelli.

== Background and competitive history ==
The team was sponsored by Japanese real estate company Leyton House.

The 871 chassis was not ready for the first race in Brazil, so the team used an F3000/F1 hybrid called the March 87P. The 871 was ready for the second race in San Marino.

The best result and the only points were achieved with a 6th place at the 1987 Monaco Grand Prix. However Capelli and the March 871 did finish 4th in the Colin Chapman Trophy for constructors of cars equipped with naturally aspirated engines.

== Complete Formula One results ==
(key)

Year	Entrant	Engine	Tyres	Drivers	1	2	3	4	5	6	7	8	9	10	11	12	13	14	15	16	Pts.	WCC
1987	March Racing Team	Cosworth DFZ; V8 NA	G		BRA	SMR	BEL	MON	DET	FRA	GBR	GER	HUN	AUT	ITA	POR	ESP	MEX	JPN	AUS	1	13th
1987	March Racing Team	Cosworth DFZ; V8 NA	G	Ivan Capelli		Ret	Ret	6	Ret	Ret	Ret	Ret	10	11	13	9	12	Ret	Ret	Ret	1	13th

== Colin Chapman Trophy (for constructors of cars equipped with naturally aspirated engines) ==
(key)

Year	Entrant	Engine	Tyres	Drivers	1	2	3	4	5	6	7	8	9	10	11	12	13	14	15	16	Pts.	CCT
1987	March Racing Team	Cosworth DFZ; V8 NA	G		BRA	SMR	BEL	MON	DET	FRA	GBR	GER	HUN	AUT	ITA	POR	ESP	MEX	JPN	AUS	38	4th
1987	March Racing Team	Cosworth DFZ; V8 NA	G	Ivan Capelli		Ret	Ret	2	Ret	Ret	Ret	Ret	3	1	2	1	3	Ret	Ret	Ret	38	4th
