= 1988 Portuguese Grand Prix =

- Race 13 of 16 in the 1988 Formula One World Championship
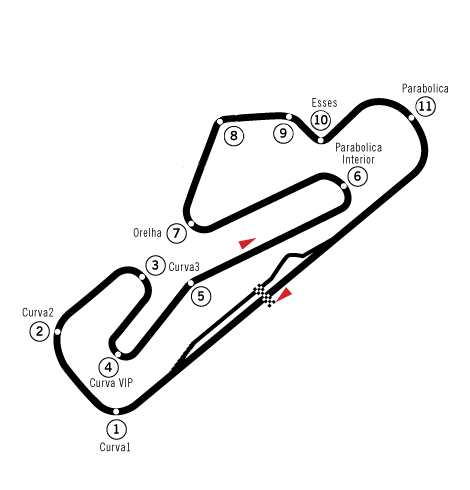

Race details
- Date: 25 September 1988
- Official name: XXII Grande Prémio de Portugal
- Location: Autódromo do Estoril, Estoril, Portugal
- Course: Permanent racing facility
- Course length: 4.350 km (2.703 miles)
- Distance: 70 laps, 304.500 km (189.207 miles)
- Weather: Sunny and hot

Pole position
Driver	(France) Alain Prost	McLaren-Honda
- Time: 1:17.411

Fastest lap
Driver	(Austria) Gerhard Berger	Ferrari
- Time: 1:21.961 on lap 31

Podium
First	(France) Alain Prost	McLaren-Honda
Second	(Italy) Ivan Capelli	March-Judd
Third	(Belgium) Thierry Boutsen	Benetton-Ford

The 1988 Portuguese Grand Prix was a Formula One motor race held on 25 September 1988 at the Autódromo do Estoril, Estoril. It was the thirteenth race of the 1988 Formula One World Championship. The 71-lap race was won by Alain Prost, driving a McLaren-Honda, with Ivan Capelli second in a March-Judd and Thierry Boutsen third in a Benetton-Ford. Prost's teammate and Drivers' Championship rival, Ayrton Senna, could only manage sixth.

== Qualifying ==
McLaren gained their 9th front row of the year with Alain Prost in front of Ayrton Senna for the first time since France. Prost, whose MP4/4 had a brand new, stiffer chassis, set his fastest time early in Saturday qualifying, and then sat out the rest of the session, confident that Senna could not better the time. Senna indeed qualified second. They were ahead of Ivan Capelli in the atmospheric March-Judd, with Maurício Gugelmin in fifth behind the Ferrari of Monza winner Gerhard Berger. Both Capelli and Gugelmin expressed delight with their cars, especially in the fast corners.

After finishing third and fourth in Italy, the Arrows-Megatrons of Derek Warwick (10th) and Eddie Cheever (18th) struggled in Portugal. Both drivers complained of little grip on the rarely used Estoril circuit, which was compounded by slow turns which exposed the Straight-4 Megatron engine's lack of throttle response.

After missing the previous two races in Belgium and Italy due to illness, Nigel Mansell was back in his Williams-Judd. Not surprisingly after a layoff due to illness, Mansell complained of a sore neck after qualifying but still managed to qualify 6th, less than 0.1 behind Gugelmin.

Julian Bailey (Tyrrell-Ford), Stefano Modena (EuroBrun-Ford), and the Zakspeeds of Piercarlo Ghinzani and Bernd Schneider all failed to qualify while Oscar Larrauri (EuroBrun-Ford) failed to pre-qualify.

== Race ==
The first start was aborted when the Rial-Ford of Andrea de Cesaris stalled on the grid. The second start was aborted after Derek Warwick stalled his Arrows A10 and was hit by de Cesaris, with Luis Pérez-Sala (Minardi) and Satoru Nakajima (Lotus). Ayrton Senna led off at the third start, to the delight of the Portuguese crowd. At the start of lap 2, Alain Prost pulled out of Senna's slipstream to pass him. Senna moved violently over on Prost and forced him towards the pit wall at over 280 km/h (174 mph). The Frenchman nonetheless maintained his will to pass the Brazilian, not lifting off the throttle, and passed Senna into the first corner.

Prost was not impressed with Senna's tactics and the pair exchanged words in the McLaren camp after the race. Senna countered Prost's anger by stating that he had almost been pushed onto the grass by Prost before the first corner after the start. Prost's lead built up to 7 seconds and would last until the flag, while Senna was being troubled by an erratic (and ultimately false) fuel readout which was telling him he was using too much. This allowed Capelli to close right up on him. On lap 22 the Italian out-braked Senna to excited acclaim and opened up a gap on him. It was the first time all season other than when Prost suffered from severe misfires at both the British and Italian GP's that a McLaren-Honda had been passed on track by any other car. Soon after Gerhard Berger also passed the McLaren, leaving Senna exposed to the attacks of Nigel Mansell's Williams. The Briton was closer on the corners, but the Honda turbo was superior in the fast sectors of the track.

Berger had claimed the fastest lap in his pursuit of Capelli, but spun off on lap 36. He had accidentally set off his fire extinguisher, with the resultant freezing of his leg with carbon dioxide causing his foot to slip off the pedals. Berger had been attempting a cockpit adjustment to his car but on the bumpy Estoril surface simply hit the wrong button. On lap 55, Mansell and Senna attempted to lap the Tyrrell of Jonathan Palmer: during this manoeuvre Mansell hit the back off the McLaren and spun into the barriers though without any damage to Senna who continued on. Maurício Gugelmin, Nelson Piquet (Lotus-Honda), Michele Alboreto (Ferrari), Riccardo Patrese (Williams-Judd) and Thierry Boutsen (Benetton-Ford) were hotly contesting the last point place in 6th. On lap 29 Patrese retired with a split radiator and the next lap Piquet retired with clutch and gearbox problems. On lap 57, Senna, still having problems with his fuel readout, pitted for a tyre change and was passed by Alboreto, Boutsen and Derek Warwick, falling to 6th.

Prost won from Capelli, who at one stage was catching the McLaren, but backed off to save his engine after seeing his teammate's car sitting beside the track with a dead engine; the gap at the line was 9.5 seconds and Prost himself was marginal on fuel. It was Capelli's second podium finish in Formula One. Fuel problems were a feature of this race: on the last corner of the race Alboreto's engine stuttered-his car was running out of fuel despite the gauge indicating he had plenty left. Boutsen passed him to get his 5th podium of the year and Warwick claimed 4th place. The dry Ferrari of Alboreto and McLaren of Senna were classified 5th and 6th.

Prost's 5th win of the year, and his first since France, along with Senna's 6th place, saw him remain in strong contention for his third World Championship.

== Classification ==
=== Pre-qualifying ===
Pos	No	Driver	Constructor	Time	Gap
1	36	(Italy) Alex Caffi	Dallara-Ford	1:21.468	—
2	21	(Italy) Nicola Larini	Osella	1:23.051	+1.583
3	31	(Italy) Gabriele Tarquini	Coloni-Ford	1:23.807	+2.339
4	33	(Italy) Stefano Modena	EuroBrun-Ford	1:24.076	+2.608
DNPQ	32	(Argentina) Oscar Larrauri	EuroBrun-Ford	1:25.146	+3.678

=== Qualifying ===
Pos	No	Driver	Constructor	Q1	Q2	Gap
1	11	(France) Alain Prost	McLaren-Honda	1:18.378	1:17.411	—
2	12	(Brazil) Ayrton Senna	McLaren-Honda	1:18.032	1:17.869	+0.458
3	16	(Italy) Ivan Capelli	March-Judd	1:20.390	1:18.812	+1.401
4	28	(Austria) Gerhard Berger	Ferrari	1:20.065	1:18.903	+1.492
5	15	(Brazil) Maurício Gugelmin	March-Judd	1:20.791	1:19.045	+1.634
6	5	(United Kingdom) Nigel Mansell	Williams-Judd	1:20.908	1:19.131	+1.720
7	27	(Italy) Michele Alboreto	Ferrari	1:21.647	1:19.372	+1.961
8	1	(Brazil) Nelson Piquet	Lotus-Honda	1:19.551	1:19.872	+2.140
9	19	(Italy) Alessandro Nannini	Benetton-Ford	1:21.008	1:19.572	+2.161
10	17	(United Kingdom) Derek Warwick	Arrows-Megatron	1:21.240	1:19.603	+2.192
11	6	(Italy) Riccardo Patrese	Williams-Judd	1:19.878	1:19.797	+2.386
12	22	(Italy) Andrea de Cesaris	Rial-Ford	1:21.386	1:19.940	+2.529
13	20	(Belgium) Thierry Boutsen	Benetton-Ford	1:20.700	1:20.314	+2.903
14	23	(Italy) Pierluigi Martini	Minardi-Ford	1:21.292	1:20.741	+3.330
15	29	(France) Yannick Dalmas	Lola-Ford	1:21.655	1:20.748	+3.337
16	2	(Japan) Satoru Nakajima	Lotus-Honda	1:22.496	1:20.783	+3.372
17	36	(Italy) Alex Caffi	Dallara-Ford	1:22.349	1:20.922	+3.511
18	18	(United States) Eddie Cheever	Arrows-Megatron	1:21.519	1:20.965	+3.554
19	24	(Spain) Luis Pérez-Sala	Minardi-Ford	1:21.909	1:21.094	+3.683
20	30	(France) Philippe Alliot	Lola-Ford	1:21.809	1:21.096	+3.685
21	14	(France) Philippe Streiff	AGS-Ford	1:21.644	1:21.418	+4.007
22	3	(United Kingdom) Jonathan Palmer	Tyrrell-Ford	1:22.797	1:21.788	+4.377
23	25	(France) René Arnoux	Ligier-Judd	1:22.786	1:21.790	+4.379
24	26	(Sweden) Stefan Johansson	Ligier-Judd	1:22.778	1:22.035	+4.624
25	21	(Italy) Nicola Larini	Osella	1:22.883	1:22.119	+4.708
26	31	(Italy) Gabriele Tarquini	Coloni-Ford	1:23.057	1:22.170	+4.759
DNQ	4	(United Kingdom) Julian Bailey	Tyrrell-Ford	1:22.946	1:22.296	+4.885
DNQ	9	(Italy) Piercarlo Ghinzani	Zakspeed	1:24.127	1:22.549	+5.138
DNQ	33	(Italy) Stefano Modena	EuroBrun-Ford	1:23.075	1:23.232	+5.664
DNQ	10	(West Germany) Bernd Schneider	Zakspeed	1:23.393	1:23.300	+5.889

=== Race ===
Pos	No	Driver	Constructor	Laps	Time/Retired	Grid	Points
1	11	(France) Alain Prost	McLaren-Honda	70	1:37:40.958	1	9
2	16	(Italy) Ivan Capelli	March-Judd	70	+ 9.553	3	6
3	20	(Belgium) Thierry Boutsen	Benetton-Ford	70	+ 44.619	13	4
4	17	(United Kingdom) Derek Warwick	Arrows-Megatron	70	+ 1:07.419	10	3
5	27	(Italy) Michele Alboreto	Ferrari	70	+ 1:11.884	7	2
6	12	(Brazil) Ayrton Senna	McLaren-Honda	70	+ 1:18.269	2	1
7	36	(Italy) Alex Caffi	Dallara-Ford	69	+ 1 lap	17	
8	24	(Spain) Luis Pérez-Sala	Minardi-Ford	68	+ 2 laps	19	
9	14	(France) Philippe Streiff	AGS-Ford	68	+ 2 laps	21	
10	25	(France) René Arnoux	Ligier-Judd	68	+ 2 laps	23	
11	31	(Italy) Gabriele Tarquini	Coloni-Ford	65	+ 5 laps	26	
12	21	(Italy) Nicola Larini	Osella	63	+ 7 laps	25	
Ret	15	(Brazil) Maurício Gugelmin	March-Judd	59	Engine	5	
Ret	5	(United Kingdom) Nigel Mansell	Williams-Judd	54	Spun off	6	
Ret	3	(United Kingdom) Jonathan Palmer	Tyrrell-Ford	53	Overheating	22	
Ret	19	(Italy) Alessandro Nannini	Benetton-Ford	52	Handling	9	
Ret	28	(Austria) Gerhard Berger	Ferrari	35	Spun off	4	
Ret	1	(Brazil) Nelson Piquet	Lotus-Honda	34	Clutch	8	
Ret	6	(Italy) Riccardo Patrese	Williams-Judd	29	Radiator	11	
Ret	23	(Italy) Pierluigi Martini	Minardi-Ford	27	Engine	14	
Ret	29	(France) Yannick Dalmas	Lola-Ford	20	Alternator	15	
Ret	2	(Japan) Satoru Nakajima	Lotus-Honda	16	Spun off	16	
Ret	22	(Italy) Andrea de Cesaris	Rial-Ford	11	Halfshaft	12	
Ret	18	(United States) Eddie Cheever	Arrows-Megatron	10	Turbo	18	
Ret	30	(France) Philippe Alliot	Lola-Ford	7	Engine	20	
Ret	26	(Sweden) Stefan Johansson	Ligier-Judd	4	Engine	24	
DNQ	4	(United Kingdom) Julian Bailey	Tyrrell-Ford				
DNQ	9	(Italy) Piercarlo Ghinzani	Zakspeed				
DNQ	33	(Italy) Stefano Modena	EuroBrun-Ford				
DNQ	10	(West Germany) Bernd Schneider	Zakspeed				
DNPQ	32	(Argentina) Oscar Larrauri	EuroBrun-Ford				

== Championship standings after the race ==
- **Bold text** indicates World Champions.

Drivers' Championship standings

Pos	Driver	Points
1	(France) Alain Prost	81
2	(Brazil) Ayrton Senna	76
3	(Austria) Gerhard Berger	37
4	(Italy) Michele Alboreto	24
5	(Belgium) Thierry Boutsen	21

Constructors' Championship standings

Pos	Constructor	Points
1	(United Kingdom) **McLaren-Honda**	157
2	(Italy) Ferrari	61
3	(United Kingdom) Benetton-Ford	34
4	(United Kingdom) Arrows-Megatron	20
5	(United Kingdom) March-Judd	19

- Only the top five positions are included for both sets of standings. Points accurate at final declaration of results. The Benettons were subsequently disqualified from the Belgian Grand Prix and their points reallocated.

Previous race: 1988 Italian Grand Prix	FIA Formula One World Championship; 1988 season	Next race: 1988 Spanish Grand Prix
Previous race: 1987 Portuguese Grand Prix	Portuguese Grand Prix	Next race: 1989 Portuguese Grand Prix
