= 1987 Brazilian Grand Prix =

- Race 1 of 16 in the 1987 Formula One World Championship
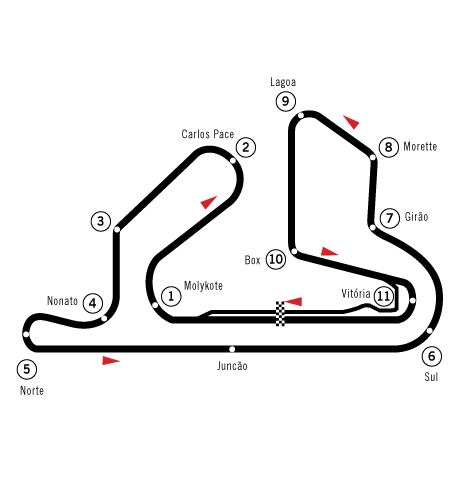

Race details
- Date: 12 April 1987
- Official name: 16º Grande Premio do Brasil
- Location: Jacarepaguá Circuit, Rio de Janeiro, Brazil
- Course: Permanent racing facility
- Course length: 5.031 km (3.126 miles)
- Distance: 61 laps, 306.891 km (190.693 miles)
- Weather: Sunny

Pole position
Driver	(United Kingdom) Nigel Mansell	Williams-Honda
- Time: 1:26.128

Fastest lap
Driver	(Brazil) Nelson Piquet	Williams-Honda
- Time: 1:33.861 on lap 41

Podium
First	(France) Alain Prost	McLaren-TAG
Second	(Brazil) Nelson Piquet	Williams-Honda
Third	(Sweden) Stefan Johansson	McLaren-TAG

The 1987 Brazilian Grand Prix was a Formula One motor race held on 12 April 1987 at the Jacarepaguá Circuit in Rio de Janeiro. The race, contested over 61 laps, was the sixteenth Brazilian Grand Prix and the eighth to be held at Jacarepaguá, and the first race of the 1987 Formula One season.

The race was won by defending World Champion Alain Prost, driving a McLaren-TAG. Local hero Nelson Piquet was second in a Williams-Honda, while Prost's new teammate Stefan Johansson took third.

== Qualifying ==
March Engineering returned to Formula One for the first time since the 1982 Caesars Palace Grand Prix, entering a single car driven by Ivan Capelli.

In almost a repeat of 1982, prior to the race there was talk of a drivers boycott due to the FIA's new Super Licence fees for 1987. Previously the fee for a drivers Super Licence had been US$825. However, from 1987 drivers who scored World Championship points the previous season would be required to pay more (i.e. the more points a driver scored, the more he paid for his licence) with drivers such as World Champion Alain Prost and Williams pair Nigel Mansell and Nelson Piquet were all required to pay around $12,000 (while others such as Lotus rookie Satoru Nakajima only had to pay the basic fee). According to the drivers, it wasn't so about the money, it was the principle that a licence is a licence and that the fee should be the same for everyone. However, by the time the cars were ready for Friday morning's first practice session, everyone (or in some cases the teams) had paid the required licence fee.

Qualifying was dominated by the Honda powered Williams, with Mansell ahead of Piquet. Third was Ayrton Senna with his Lotus. The Lotus 99T, now in the Yellow and Blue colours of new sponsors Camel Cigarettes, was using the computer-controlled active suspension for the first time in the hope that its advantages (keeping the car at the optimum ride height) would give them an edge over the rest of the field. The total number of cars entered for the event was 23, but on race day the March team, who went into the race with a modified Formula 3000 car for young F1 Italian driver Ivan Capelli due to their new car not being ready, ran out of Cosworth DFZs, blowing their last in the Sunday morning warm-up and there were only 22 starters.

Qualifying also saw the FIA's controversial pop-off valves used for the first time on the turbocharged cars. The valves limited turbo boost pressure to 4.0 Bar where previously boost was only limited to what the engineers felt the engines could take. The valves were far from popular with the teams and drivers, however, with some drivers complaining throughout the weekend that they were cutting in too early and not allowing enough boost. Arrows driver Derek Warwick told that at times his valve was opening at just 2.6 Bar (a loss of approximately 280 bhp (209 kW; 284 PS)) while Benetton's Thierry Boutsen told that the two valves on his Ford V6 were both opening at different levels and both well below the 4 Bar limit. McLaren got around the pop-off valve problem by limiting turbo boost on their TAG-Porsche engines to just 3.6 Bar of pressure throughout the weekend, thus never allowing the valves to come into play. One unnamed team mechanic was reported to have said that the valves were the only crude piece of engineering on a modern Grand Prix car.

The Ligier team was absent from Rio, missing their first race since the French boycott of the 1985 South African Grand Prix. The team had been set to use a new 4-cylinder, turbocharged Alfa Romeo engine for the season. However, during pre-season testing lead driver René Arnoux compared the new 415T to used food. This gave Alfa's parent company Fiat the excuse they wanted to pull out of its association with the team leaving Ligier without an engine for the season, though Ligier were able to secure a supply of Megatron turbo's from the Arrows team sponsors USF&G and would use them from San Marino until the end of the season.

== Race ==
At the start Piquet was fastest, taking the lead from Senna, while Mansell made a bad start; the Benetton B187s of Boutsen and Teo Fabi out dragged Mansell and Prost. Adrián Campos was disqualified for an incorrect starting procedure, he had forgotten his ear plugs and by the time he had fitted them on the grid the rest of the field had moved away on the warm-up lap. Campos resumed his grid position instead of starting at the rear, and race officials removed him for his rookie mistake. Piquet's lead did not last long: on lap 7, he had to pit with engine overheating caused by litter on the track getting into the radiator sidepods. He rejoined back in eleventh position, leaving Senna to lead Mansell (who in the meantime fought back to second) although he too entered in the pits to have his radiators cleared. He rejoined behind Piquet and the pair began to climb through the field.

Senna pitted because of handling troubles of his Lotus 99T and so Prost went into the lead. When Prost stopped for fresh tyres the lead was briefly passed to Thierry Boutsen, who was performing admirably with his Benetton-Ford, but his lead lasted less than half a lap before Piquet went back to first before his second stop, on lap 21. Prost then went ahead again and led for the rest of the race, never looking threatened as he preserved his tyres to only require two stops, while his rivals Senna and Piquet had three.

Mansell's race was compromised late in the race by a tyre puncture, who sent him back to seventh place. On lap 51 Senna suffered an engine failure, causing him to retire from the second place he held for much of the race despite problems with the Lotus's active suspensions. Senna, who pulled off the track in front of the pits, reported that his engine had not actually blown, but that he could feel it was seizing and felt it would be better to retire rather than to destroy the engine.

Prost won ahead of Piquet, his teammate Stefan Johansson, Gerhard Berger (who battled for the whole race with handling problems of his Ferrari F1/87), Boutsen and Mansell, who caught the last point. Satoru Nakajima's first Grand Prix, saw him finish just outside the points in seventh in his Lotus. This was Prost's 26th victory, which made him the second most successful Grand Prix winner at the time, moving him ahead of Jim Clark and just one win behind tying with Jackie Stewart as the most successful.

== Classification ==
=== Qualifying ===
Pos	No	Driver	Constructor	Q1	Q2	Gap
1	5	(United Kingdom) Nigel Mansell	Williams-Honda	1:27.901	1:26.128	—
2	6	(Brazil) Nelson Piquet	Williams-Honda	1:27.822	1:26.567	+0.439
3	12	(Brazil) Ayrton Senna	Lotus-Honda	1:29.002	1:28.408	+2.280
4	19	(Italy) Teo Fabi	Benetton-Ford	1:30.439	1:28.417	+2.289
5	1	(France) Alain Prost	McLaren-TAG	1:29.522	1:29.175	+3.047
6	20	(Belgium) Thierry Boutsen	Benetton-Ford	1:30.166	1:29.450	+3.322
7	28	(Austria) Gerhard Berger	Ferrari	1:31.444	1:30.357	+4.229
8	17	(United Kingdom) Derek Warwick	Arrows-Megatron	1:32.531	1:30.467	+4.339
9	27	(Italy) Michele Alboreto	Ferrari	1:31.218	1:30.468	+4.340
10	2	(Sweden) Stefan Johansson	McLaren-TAG	1:31.343	1:30.476	+4.348
11	7	(Italy) Riccardo Patrese	Brabham-BMW	1:32.001	1:31.179	+5.051
12	11	(Japan) Satoru Nakajima	Lotus-Honda	1:34.445	1:32.276	+6.148
13	8	(Italy) Andrea de Cesaris	Brabham-BMW	1:32.402	1:34.115	+6.274
14	18	(United States) Eddie Cheever	Arrows-Megatron	1:33.084	1:32.769	+6.641
15	24	(Italy) Alessandro Nannini	Minardi-Motori Moderni	1:33.980	1:33.729	+7.601
16	23	(Spain) Adrián Campos	Minardi-Motori Moderni	—	1:33.825	+7.697
17	10	(West Germany) Christian Danner	Zakspeed	1:36.178	1:35.212	+9.084
18	3	(United Kingdom) Jonathan Palmer	Tyrrell-Ford	1:37.488	1:36.091	+9.963
19	9	(United Kingdom) Martin Brundle	Zakspeed	1:37.235	1:36.160	+10.032
20	4	(France) Philippe Streiff	Tyrrell-Ford	1:38.822	1:36.274	+10.146
21	21	(Italy) Alex Caffi	Osella-Alfa Romeo	1:39.931	1:38.770	+12.642
22	14	(France) Pascal Fabre	AGS-Ford	1:44.126	1:39.816	+13.688
23	16	(Italy) Ivan Capelli	March-Ford	1:43.580	2:02.966	+17.452

=== Race ===
Numbers in brackets refer to positions of normally aspirated entrants competing for the Jim Clark Trophy.

Pos	No	Driver	Constructor	Laps	Time/Retired	Grid	Points
1	1	(France) Alain Prost	McLaren-TAG	61	1:39:45.141	5	9
2	6	(Brazil) Nelson Piquet	Williams-Honda	61	+ 40.547	2	6
3	2	(Sweden) Stefan Johansson	McLaren-TAG	61	+ 56.758	10	4
4	28	(Austria) Gerhard Berger	Ferrari	61	+ 1:39.235	7	3
5	20	(Belgium) Thierry Boutsen	Benetton-Ford	60	+ 1 Lap	6	2
6	5	(United Kingdom) Nigel Mansell	Williams-Honda	60	+ 1 Lap	1	1
7	11	(Japan) Satoru Nakajima	Lotus-Honda	59	+ 2 Laps	12	
8	27	(Italy) Michele Alboreto	Ferrari	58	Spun Off	9	
9	10	(West Germany) Christian Danner	Zakspeed	58	+ 3 Laps	17	
10 (1)	3	(United Kingdom) Jonathan Palmer	Tyrrell-Ford	58	+ 3 Laps	18	
11 (2)	4	(France) Philippe Streiff	Tyrrell-Ford	57	+ 4 Laps	20	
12 (3)	14	(France) Pascal Fabre	AGS-Ford	55	+ 6 Laps	22	
Ret	18	(United States) Eddie Cheever	Arrows-Megatron	52	Overheating	14	
Ret	12	(Brazil) Ayrton Senna	Lotus-Honda	50	Engine	3	
Ret	7	(Italy) Riccardo Patrese	Brabham-BMW	48	Electrical	11	
Ret	8	(Italy) Andrea de Cesaris	Brabham-BMW	21	Differential	13	
Ret	17	(United Kingdom) Derek Warwick	Arrows-Megatron	20	Engine	8	
Ret	21	(Italy) Alex Caffi	Osella-Alfa Romeo	20	Withdrew	21	
Ret	24	(Italy) Alessandro Nannini	Minardi-Motori Moderni	17	Suspension	15	
Ret	9	(United Kingdom) Martin Brundle	Zakspeed	15	Turbo	19	
Ret	19	(Italy) Teo Fabi	Benetton-Ford	9	Turbo	4	
DSQ	23	(Spain) Adrián Campos	Minardi-Motori Moderni	3	Incorrect starting procedure	16	
DNS	16	(Italy) Ivan Capelli	March-Ford	0	Non Starter	23	

== Championship standings after the race ==
Drivers' Championship standings

Pos	Driver	Points
1	(France) Alain Prost	9
2	(Brazil) Nelson Piquet	6
3	(Sweden) Stefan Johansson	4
4	(Austria) Gerhard Berger	3
5	(Belgium) Thierry Boutsen	2

Constructors' Championship standings

Pos	Constructor	Points
1	(United Kingdom) McLaren-TAG	13
2	(United Kingdom) Williams-Honda	7
3	(Italy) Ferrari	3
4	(United Kingdom) Benetton-Ford	2

Jim Clark Trophy standings

Pos	Driver	Points
1	(United Kingdom) Jonathan Palmer	9
2	(France) Philippe Streiff	6
3	(France) Pascal Fabre	4

Colin Chapman trophy standings

Pos	Constructor	Points
1	(United Kingdom) Tyrrell-Ford	15
2	(France) AGS-Ford	4

- Note: Only the top five positions are included for all four sets of standings.

Previous race: 1986 Australian Grand Prix	FIA Formula One World Championship; 1987 season	Next race: 1987 San Marino Grand Prix
Previous race: 1986 Brazilian Grand Prix	Brazilian Grand Prix	Next race: 1988 Brazilian Grand Prix
