= 1991 Australian Grand Prix =

16th and final race of the 1991 Formula One World Championship

Race 16 of 16 in the 1991 Formula One World Championship
← Previous race	Next race →

Race details
- Date: 3 November 1991
- Official name: Foster's Australian Grand Prix
- Location: Adelaide Street Circuit, Adelaide, Australia
- Course: Temporary street circuit
- Course length: 3.780 km (2.362 miles)
- Distance: 14 laps, 52.92 km (32.88 miles)
- Scheduled distance: 81 laps, 306.18 km (190.23 miles)
- Weather: Torrential rain

Pole position
Driver	(Brazil) Ayrton Senna	McLaren-Honda
- Time: 1:14.041

Fastest lap
Driver	(Austria) Gerhard Berger	McLaren-Honda
- Time: 1:41.141 on lap 14

Podium
First	(Brazil) Ayrton Senna	McLaren-Honda
Second	(United Kingdom) Nigel Mansell	Williams-Renault
Third	(Austria) Gerhard Berger	McLaren- Honda

The 1991 Australian Grand Prix was a Formula One motor race held on 3 November 1991 at the Adelaide Street Circuit. It was the 16th and final race of the 1991 Formula One World Championship. Torrential rain resulted in the race being stopped after just 16 of the scheduled 81 laps had been completed. The official results were declared from the end of the 14th lap, two laps before the race was suspended, in line with regulations. It holds the record for being the shortest Formula One World Championship race that was legally conducted under modern rules; the 2021 Belgian Grand Prix, which ran two aborted formation laps that did not count and three laps under the safety car before it was red-flagged (two of which did not count under the countback rule), does not count under the post-2022 rule changes. From a timing standpoint, it is the shortest Formula One World Championship race in history, as the race lasted barely 30 minutes from formation lap to abandonment. (The 2021 Belgium race started with two formation laps began at 15.25, then delayed until 18.15 and abandoning the attempt at 18.25 after three more laps.)

The race was won by Ayrton Senna, with Nigel Mansell in second position, and Gerhard Berger's third-place finish plus Senna's victory meant that the McLaren team clinched the Constructor's championship. Mansell was unable to take part in the post-race podium ceremony, following a crash at the end of the race that left him requiring hospital treatment. Because less than seventy-five percent of the scheduled race distance had been completed, only half the normal World Championship points were awarded. This was also the final Formula One race for three time World Champion Nelson Piquet. It was the 60th pole position for Ayrton Senna. It would also prove to be the final Grand Prix for Satoru Nakajima, Naoki Hattori, Alex Caffi, and Emanuele Pirro, and was the last race with Pirelli tyres until the 2011 Australian Grand Prix.

== Pre-race ==
Ferrari terminated Alain Prost's contract with the team following his public criticism of them. His raceseat was taken by Gianni Morbidelli, the Ferrari test driver. After being dropped by the Jordan team two races earlier, Roberto Moreno returned to Formula One to take Morbidelli's place at Minardi. Benetton did not renew Nelson Piquet's contract with the team, and Australia would be his last Formula One race. Bertrand Gachot returned to Formula One after completing his jail sentence in Britain, replacing Éric Bernard at Larrousse, who had been injured at the previous race meeting in Japan. The Coloni team were entered for their final Grand Prix; new owner Andrea Sassetti had confirmed that the team would be reborn as Andrea Moda Formula for the following season. Williams also had a 'B'-spec version of the FW14 present, but elected not to use it in the race.

== Qualifying ==
=== Pre-qualifying report ===
The one-hour pre-qualifying session took place in sunny and dry conditions on Thursday afternoon, instead of Friday morning to expand the race meeting to four days. The session resulted in the Brabham and Footwork teams getting their cars through to the main qualifying sessions, with Martin Brundle's Brabham three tenths of a second faster than Alex Caffi's Footwork. Mark Blundell was just four hundredths of a second behind in the other Brabham, with Michele Alboreto's Footwork just 0.002 of a second slower in fourth.

Gabriele Tarquini narrowly failed to pre-qualify for Fondmetal as his track time was limited after a left rear suspension failure on the exit of turn 11, which turned his car into the wall. It was his first failure to pre-qualify for Fondmetal in three attempts. Slowest was Naoki Hattori in the Coloni, over five seconds away from Brundle's pace. Coloni had failed to pre-qualify for every race in 1991, their last season at the highest level. It also proved to be Hattori's last opportunity at this level.

=== Pre-qualifying classification ===
Pos	No	Driver	Constructor	Time	Gap
1	7	(United Kingdom) Martin Brundle	Brabham-Yamaha	1:17.707	—
2	10	(Italy) Alex Caffi	Footwork-Ford	1:18.007	+0.300
3	8	(United Kingdom) Mark Blundell	Brabham-Yamaha	1:18.049	+0.342
4	9	(Italy) Michele Alboreto	Footwork-Ford	1:18.051	+0.344
5	14	(Italy) Gabriele Tarquini	Fondmetal-Ford	1:18.184	+0.477
6	31	(Japan) Naoki Hattori	Coloni-Ford	1:22.852	+5.145

=== Qualifying report ===
The sunshine continued for both the remaining qualifying sessions on the Friday and Saturday. Aguri Suzuki crashed heavily at turn 1 which contributed to his failure to qualify. His new teammate Bertrand Gachot also did not progress through qualifying. Martin Brundle, having finished in the points in the last race and pre-qualified fastest on the Friday, surprisingly struggled and failed to qualify in his last race for Brabham-Yamaha. Stefano Modena also crashed in qualifying but was unhurt and able to take the race start on Sunday, having already set a time that was sufficient for him to secure a place on the grid. McLaren managed to qualify both their cars on the front row of the grid with Senna in pole position. Nigel Mansell and Riccardo Patrese, in the two Williams-Renault cars, occupied the second row. Benetton occupied the third row with Nelson Piquet out-qualifying Michael Schumacher for the only time in the 1991 season. Gianni Morbidelli qualified in 8th position, only one place behind Jean Alesi in his first race for Ferrari. In his first race for Minardi-Ferrari, Roberto Moreno also managed to qualify 18th fastest.

=== Qualifying classification ===
Pos	No	Driver	Constructor	Q1	Q2	Gap
1	1	(Brazil) Ayrton Senna	McLaren-Honda	1:14.210	1:14.041	—
2	2	(Austria) Gerhard Berger	McLaren-Honda	1:14.385	1:15.563	+0.344
3	5	(United Kingdom) Nigel Mansell	Williams-Renault	1:14.822	1:14.897	+0.781
4	6	(Italy) Riccardo Patrese	Williams-Renault	1:15.633	1:15.057	+1.016
5	20	(Brazil) Nelson Piquet	Benetton-Ford	1:16.552	1:15.291	+1.250
6	19	(West Germany) Michael Schumacher	Benetton-Ford	1:15.840	1:15.508	+1.467
7	28	(France) Jean Alesi	Ferrari	1:17.014	1:15.545	+1.504
8	27	(Italy) Gianni Morbidelli	Ferrari	1:16.203	1:17.679	+2.162
9	4	(Italy) Stefano Modena	Tyrrell-Honda	1:16.253	45:56.547	+2.212
10	23	(Italy) Pierluigi Martini	Minardi-Ferrari	1:17.614	1:16.359	+2.318
11	22	(Finland) JJ Lehto	Dallara-Judd	1:17.665	1:16.871	+2.830
12	33	(Italy) Andrea de Cesaris	Jordan-Ford	1:17.073	1:17.050	+3.009
13	21	(Italy) Emanuele Pirro	Dallara-Judd	1:17.342	1:18.233	+3.301
14	15	(Brazil) Maurício Gugelmin	Leyton House-Ilmor	1:17.344	1:17.431	+3.303
15	9	(Italy) Michele Alboreto	Footwork-Ford	1:18.214	1:17.355	+3.314
16	32	(Italy) Alessandro Zanardi	Jordan-Ford	1:17.362	1:17.723	+3.321
17	8	(United Kingdom) Mark Blundell	Brabham-Yamaha	1:17.867	1:17.365	+3.324
18	24	(Brazil) Roberto Moreno	Minardi-Ferrari	1:19.752	1:17.639	+3.598
19	34	(Italy) Nicola Larini	Lambo-Lamborghini	1:19.076	1:17.936	+3.895
20	25	(Belgium) Thierry Boutsen	Ligier-Lamborghini	1:18.992	1:17.969	+3.958
21	12	(United Kingdom) Johnny Herbert	Lotus-Judd	1:19.177	1:18.091	+4.050
22	26	(France) Érik Comas	Ligier-Lamborghini	1:19.678	1:18.112	+4.071
23	10	(Italy) Alex Caffi	Footwork-Ford	1:18.783	1:18.157	+4.116
24	3	(Japan) Satoru Nakajima	Tyrrell-Honda	1:18.216	1:18.307	+4.175
25	11	(Finland) Mika Häkkinen	Lotus-Judd	1:19.199	1:18.271	+4.230
26	16	(Austria) Karl Wendlinger	Leyton House-Ilmor	1:18.282	2:12.369	+4.241
27	30	(Japan) Aguri Suzuki	Lola-Ford	26:19.244	1:18.393	+4.352
28	7	(United Kingdom) Martin Brundle	Brabham-Yamaha	1:18.887	1:18.855	+4.814
29	35	(Belgium) Eric van de Poele	Lambo-Lamborghini	1:20.123	1:19.000	+4.959
30	29	(Belgium) Bertrand Gachot	Lola-Ford	1:20.163	1:19.274	+5.233

== Race ==
=== Race report ===
In the torrential rain (which had been falling since halfway through the Group A touring car support race earlier in the day), the race started mostly without incident. Riccardo Patrese lost two places at the start and emerged behind Jean Alesi's Ferrari but there were no accidents in the first few laps. However, as the race continued into lap 3 Gerhard Berger, unseen by the television cameras, ran wide which allowed Nigel Mansell to move up to second position, but rejoining in third. Mansell then proceeded to quickly close the gap to Ayrton Senna in first place. But by lap 5 the incidents began to occur which would affect Mansell's ability to pass Senna. This was because so many yellow flags were being displayed by the marshals around the extremely wet circuit. On lap six Mansell moved alongside Senna on the Brabham Straight but quickly saw a wave from a marshal, who was leaning out from the barriers, to warn of wreckage ahead. Nicola Larini's Modena-Lamborghini had crashed on the straight and was lying across the track. Mansell had to abandon his line and rejoin the racing line behind Senna, who had also had to avoid Jean Alesi's stricken Ferrari, which had also crashed yards after Larini on the other side of the road, as did Schumacher's Benetton who also spun off on the side of the road.

Pierluigi Martini's Minardi car aquaplaned on the Brabham Straight on lap 10, which sent his car straight into the right hand wall and rebounded to the other side of the track before eventually stopping out of the drivers' way. This indicated that the rain was beginning to fall even harder, and more torrential than before. On lap 14, Mauricio Gugelmin's Leyton House was involved in a heavy crash trying to pass the Tyrrell of Stefano Modena going through turn 15. He lost control in the right hand turn and hit the inside wall of the pit lane entrance at the turn 16 hairpin with such speed, he became airborne. Two track marshals suffered minor injuries from flying debris.

Riccardo Patrese was struggling with his car because a front wing, from another car, got stuck towards the front of his undertray. This was spotted by James Hunt in the BBC race commentary, although Murray Walker had suggested earlier that it was the undertray that was loose. Mansell then, as a result of the increasing downpour, spun off on the start of lap 16 on the Wakefield Road straight, before turn 3, having "instantly gone out of control" according to Mansell himself. The torrential downpour also made Michele Alboreto spin out of the race on lap 15 as well as Modena, although he continued. Nelson Piquet also spun at the high-speed Stag turn but was able to recover and he continued as well.

Gerhard Berger spun off at the end of lap 16 having just recovered from an earlier spin at the Malthouse Corner moments before. Murray Walker said that the weather was becoming worse and the rain was lashing down on the start/finish line. Just after this happened Senna drove onto the start/finish straight and gestured to the race officials, as he went past, to try to get the race stopped. Moments later, with Senna on lap 17, the race was finally stopped. By the end of lap 16 the race order actually was Senna in 1st from Piquet, Morbidelli, de Cesaris, Zanardi and Modena. However, the race officials decided to count back to lap 14 despite the 1991 ruling that early race stoppages should have been counted back one lap. This incident was similar to the controversy of the 2003 Brazilian Grand Prix, where computers finalising the race concluded the result a lap too early.

There were attempts to restart the race from the officials, who showed their determination to do so by ordering the 10-minute warning board to be displayed to the drivers and teams to indicate a race restart. But after serious protests from Senna and Riccardo Patrese (who stormed up to the race stewards to argue against a restart), the race was finally abandoned for good. Roland Bruynseraede eventually waved the red flag to indicate the stoppage to the spectators, drivers and teams. As a result, Senna was declared the race winner from Mansell and Berger.

=== Post-race ===
The podium ceremony only had Ayrton Senna and Gerhard Berger present because Nigel Mansell was sent to hospital after the injuries he sustained in his crash on lap 16. When interviewed by Jackie Stewart in the post-race press conference, Senna stated:

I don't think that was a race, it was just a matter of staying on the circuit, and there was no point to try to go quick at all. It was impossible! We had a race, a very bad one, here a couple of years ago and then was impossible [in reference to the 1989 Australian Grand Prix, which was run under identically treacherous wet conditions] and today was even worse! There was even more water on the back straight.

Senna and Berger both revealed at the press conference that they would not have started the race if this race did not determine the Constructor's Championship, as the McLaren and Williams teams both went into this race with a chance of winning the championship. When Stewart asked him if they should start a race if ever faced with those type of wet conditions in the future, Senna's reply was a firm "No, they should not start the race", though he understood the pressure that was on the officials and teams to start. He then added that the officials should not be held solely responsible as the drivers, including himself, chose to get in their cars and start the race so they should be held equally responsible.

Nigel Mansell, after being helped from his Williams-Renault commented that "everything was ok other than it was a complete joke, I mean there was debris all over the place. I've got a headache like there's no tomorrow, so I've probably had a little bit of a concussion". He also made reference to the fact that "there was a truck down the straight" as well as four cars and, as a result, the race should have had 10 laps to be stopped.

With less than seventy-five percent of the race distance being completed, half the usual world championship points were awarded, the first time this had happened in Formula One since the wet 1984 Monaco Grand Prix had been stopped just before half distance. Senna and Berger's result was enough for McLaren to win the 1991 World Constructors Championship by 14 points over Williams. This was McLaren's seventh constructors championship, and their fourth and last championship won with engine partners Honda.

=== Race classification ===
Pos	No	Driver	Constructor	Tyre	Laps	Time/Retired	Grid	Points
1	1	(Brazil) Ayrton Senna	McLaren-Honda	G	14	24:34.899	1	5
2	5	(United Kingdom) Nigel Mansell	Williams-Renault	G	14	+ 1.259	3	3
3	2	(Austria) Gerhard Berger	McLaren-Honda	G	14	+ 5.120	2	2
4	20	(Brazil) Nelson Piquet	Benetton-Ford	P	14	+ 30.103	5	1.5
5	6	(Italy) Riccardo Patrese	Williams-Renault	G	14	+ 50.537	4	1
6	27	(Italy) Gianni Morbidelli	Ferrari	G	14	+ 51.069	8	0.5
7	21	(Italy) Emanuele Pirro	Dallara-Judd	P	14	+ 52.361	13	
8	33	(Italy) Andrea de Cesaris	Jordan-Ford	G	14	+ 1:00.431	12	
9	32	(Italy) Alessandro Zanardi	Jordan-Ford	G	14	+ 1:15.567	16	
10	4	(Italy) Stefano Modena	Tyrrell-Honda	P	14	+ 1:20.370	9	
11	12	(United Kingdom) Johnny Herbert	Lotus-Judd	G	14	+ 1:22.073	21	
12	22	(Finland) JJ Lehto	Dallara-Judd	P	14	+ 1:38.519	11	
13	9	(Italy) Michele Alboreto	Footwork-Ford	G	14	+ 1:39.303	15	
14	15	(Brazil) Maurício Gugelmin	Leyton House-Ilmor	G	13	Accident	14	
15	10	(Italy) Alex Caffi	Footwork-Ford	G	13	+ 1 lap	23	
16	24	(Brazil) Roberto Moreno	Minardi-Ferrari	G	13	+ 1 lap	18	
17	8	(United Kingdom) Mark Blundell	Brabham-Yamaha	P	13	+ 1 lap	17	
18	26	(France) Érik Comas	Ligier-Lamborghini	G	13	+ 1 lap	22	
19	11	(Finland) Mika Häkkinen	Lotus-Judd	G	13	+ 1 lap	25	
20	16	(Austria) Karl Wendlinger	Leyton House-Ilmor	G	12	+ 2 laps	26	
Ret	23	(Italy) Pierluigi Martini	Minardi-Ferrari	G	8	Spun off	10	
Ret	19	(West Germany) Michael Schumacher	Benetton-Ford	P	5	Spun off	6	
Ret	28	(France) Jean Alesi	Ferrari	G	5	Accident	7	
Ret	34	(Italy) Nicola Larini	Lambo-Lamborghini	G	5	Spun off	19	
Ret	25	(Belgium) Thierry Boutsen	Ligier-Lamborghini	G	5	Accident	20	
Ret	3	(Japan) Satoru Nakajima	Tyrrell-Honda	P	4	Spun off	24	
DNQ	30	(Japan) Aguri Suzuki	Lola-Ford	G				
DNQ	7	(United Kingdom) Martin Brundle	Brabham-Yamaha	P				
DNQ	35	(Belgium) Eric van de Poele	Lambo-Lamborghini	G				
DNQ	29	(Belgium) Bertrand Gachot	Lola-Ford	G				
DNPQ	14	(Italy) Gabriele Tarquini	Fondmetal-Ford	G				
DNPQ	31	(Japan) Naoki Hattori	Coloni-Ford	G				

== Final championship standings ==
Drivers' Championship standings

Pos	Driver	Points
1	(Brazil) **Ayrton Senna**	96
2	(United Kingdom) Nigel Mansell	72
3	(Italy) Riccardo Patrese	53
4	(Austria) Gerhard Berger	43
5	(France) Alain Prost	34

Constructors' Championship standings

Pos	Constructor	Points
1	(United Kingdom) **McLaren-Honda**	139
2	(United Kingdom) Williams-Renault	125
3	(Italy) Ferrari	55.5
4	(United Kingdom) Benetton-Ford	38.5
5	(Republic of Ireland) Jordan-Ford	13

- Note: Only the top five positions are included for both sets of standings.
- **Bold text** indicates the 1991 World Champions.

Previous race: 1991 Japanese Grand Prix	FIA Formula One World Championship; 1991 season	Next race: 1992 South African Grand Prix
Previous race: 1990 Australian Grand Prix	Australian Grand Prix	Next race: 1992 Australian Grand Prix
