= 1991 Japanese Grand Prix =

- Race 15 of 16 in the 1991 Formula One World Championship

Race details
- Date: 20 October 1991
- Official name: XVII Fuji Television Japanese Grand Prix
- Location: Suzuka Circuit, Suzuka, Japan
- Course: Permanent racing facility
- Course length: 5.860 km (3.641 miles)
- Distance: 53 laps, 310.580 km (192.985 miles)
- Weather: Sunny, warm
- Attendance: 337,000

Pole position
Driver	(Austria) Gerhard Berger	McLaren-Honda
- Time: 1:34.700

Fastest lap
Driver	(Brazil) Ayrton Senna	McLaren-Honda
- Time: 1:41.532 on lap 39

Podium
First	(Austria) Gerhard Berger	McLaren-Honda
Second	(Brazil) Ayrton Senna	McLaren-Honda
Third	(Italy) Riccardo Patrese	Williams-Renault

The 1991 Japanese Grand Prix (formally the XVII Fuji Television Japanese Grand Prix) was a Formula One motor race held at Suzuka on 20 October 1991. It was the fifteenth round of the 1991 Formula One season. The 53-lap race was won by McLaren driver Gerhard Berger after he started from pole position. His teammate Ayrton Senna finished second and Riccardo Patrese was third for the Williams team. The race would mark McLaren's last one-two finish for six years until the 1997 European Grand Prix.

This was also Honda's last one-two finish until the 2019 Brazilian Grand Prix. Most notably, Senna's second-place-finish was sufficient to crown him World Champion for the third and final time in his career, having built an unassailable 22-point-lead over eventual runner-up Nigel Mansell with one round to spare.

== Pre-race ==
Formula One moved to Japan with the fight for the title still open; this was the fifth year in a row that the title would be decided at the Suzuka circuit. Both championship contenders Ayrton Senna and Nigel Mansell knew exactly what they needed to do; Mansell had to win with help and Senna needed to beat Mansell. There were several changes to the driver lineup, the most notable being at Leyton House where Ivan Capelli had been replaced by young Austrian Karl Wendlinger, with Capelli being freed up as a spare driver for Ferrari if Alain Prost decided not to enter. It was the first time the Leyton House/March team had not entered with Capelli as a named driver since their return to the grid in 1987, during which time he had partnered Mauricio Gugelmin in every race from 1988 onwards. Elsewhere, AGS had run out of money and did not make the voyage to Japan, while fellow stragglers Coloni had hired local driver Naoki Hattori. Johnny Herbert was back behind the wheel of the Lotus after having missed a few races in the second half of the season due to Japanese Formula 3000 commitments.

== Qualifying ==
=== Pre-qualifying report ===
With the withdrawal of AGS from Formula One prior to this event, and the return of the Coloni team after missing the last grand Prix, the pre-qualifying pool was reduced to six cars.

A Brabham topped the time sheets for the seventh time this season as Martin Brundle was fastest, over a second ahead of Alex Caffi in the Footwork. It was only the second time in seven attempts that the Italian had pre-qualified. His team-mate Michele Alboreto was third fastest, just under a tenth of a second slower. The fourth and final pre-qualifying position went to Gabriele Tarquini for Fondmetal, the second time in as many attempts that he had pre-qualified for his new team.

For the first time in 1991, the other Brabham failed to pre-qualify, as Mark Blundell suffered an oil leak in his Yamaha engine during the session. His time was only good enough for fifth place. Coloni had hired the 1990 Japanese Formula Three champion, Naoki Hattori, to replace Pedro Chaves for the last two races of the season, but the car broke down before Hattori was able to post a representative time.

=== Pre-qualifying classification ===
Pos	No	Driver	Constructor	Time	Gap
1	7	(United Kingdom) Martin Brundle	Brabham-Yamaha	1:41.289	—
2	10	(Italy) Alex Caffi	Footwork-Ford	1:42.382	+1.093
3	9	(Italy) Michele Alboreto	Footwork-Ford	1:42.479	+1.190
4	14	(Italy) Gabriele Tarquini	Fondmetal-Ford	1:43.025	+1.736
5	8	(United Kingdom) Mark Blundell	Brabham-Yamaha	1:44.025	+2.736
6	31	(Japan) Naoki Hattori	Coloni-Ford	2:00.035	+18.746

=== Qualifying report ===
There were a number of accidents during the qualifying sessions, including young sensation Michael Schumacher and Ferrari driver Jean Alesi. The biggest of these accidents was the one that befell Éric Bernard who broke his ankle and would not take any further part in the race. At the end of the qualifying sessions it was a McLaren front row with Gerhard Berger ahead of Ayrton Senna. Mansell was third followed by the unhappy Alain Prost, Riccardo Patrese, Jean Alesi, Pierluigi Martini, Gianni Morbidelli, Michael Schumacher, and Nelson Piquet. Senna was right where he wanted to be, while Mansell knew he had his work cut out for him.

=== Qualifying classification ===
Pos	No	Driver	Constructor	Q1	Q2	Gap
1	2	(Austria) Gerhard Berger	McLaren-Honda	1:36.458	1:34.700	—
2	1	(Brazil) Ayrton Senna	McLaren-Honda	1:36.490	1:34.898	+0.198
3	5	(United Kingdom) Nigel Mansell	Williams-Renault	1:36.529	1:34.922	+0.222
4	27	(France) Alain Prost	Ferrari	1:37.565	1:36.670	+1.970
5	6	(Italy) Riccardo Patrese	Williams-Renault	1:37.874	1:36.882	+2.182
6	28	(France) Jean Alesi	Ferrari	1:37.718	1:37.140	+2.440
7	23	(Italy) Pierluigi Martini	Minardi-Ferrari	1:40.176	1:38.154	+3.454
8	24	(Italy) Gianni Morbidelli	Minardi-Ferrari	1:41.088	1:38.248	+3.548
9	19	(Germany) Michael Schumacher	Benetton-Ford	1:39.742	1:38.363	+3.663
10	20	(Brazil) Nelson Piquet	Benetton-Ford	1:40.557	1:38.614	+3.914
11	33	(Italy) Andrea de Cesaris	Jordan-Ford	1:40.407	1:38.842	+4.142
12	22	(Finland) JJ Lehto	Dallara-Judd	1:40.191	1:38.911	+4.211
13	32	(Italy) Alessandro Zanardi	Jordan-Ford	1:39.051	1:38.923	+4.223
14	4	(Italy) Stefano Modena	Tyrrell-Honda	1:39.245	1:38.926	+4.226
15	3	(Japan) Satoru Nakajima	Tyrrell-Honda	1:40.100	1:39.118	+4.418
16	21	(Italy) Emanuele Pirro	Dallara-Judd	1:41.246	1:39.238	+4.538
17	25	(Belgium) Thierry Boutsen	Ligier-Lamborghini	1:39.946	1:39.499	+4.799
18	15	(Brazil) Maurício Gugelmin	Leyton House-Ilmor	1:40.714	1:39.518	+4.818
19	7	(United Kingdom) Martin Brundle	Brabham-Yamaha	1:40.867	1:39.697	+4.997
20	26	(France) Érik Comas	Ligier-Lamborghini	1:41.251	1:39.820	+5.120
21	11	(Finland) Mika Häkkinen	Lotus-Judd	1:41.485	1:40.024	+5.324
22	16	(Austria) Karl Wendlinger	Leyton House-Ilmor	1:41.639	1:40.092	+5.392
23	12	(United Kingdom) Johnny Herbert	Lotus-Judd	1:40.512	1:40.170	+5.470
24	14	(Italy) Gabriele Tarquini	Fondmetal-Ford	1:42.835	1:40.184	+5.484
25	30	(Japan) Aguri Suzuki	Lola-Ford	1:41.528	1:40.255	+5.555
26	10	(Italy) Alex Caffi	Footwork-Ford	1:40.517	1:40.402	+5.702
27	9	(Italy) Michele Alboreto	Footwork-Ford	1:41.536	1:40.844	+6.144
28	34	(Italy) Nicola Larini	Lambo-Lamborghini	1:43.057	1:42.492	+7.792
29	35	(Belgium) Eric van de Poele	Lambo-Lamborghini	1:46.641	1:42.724	+8.024
30	29	(France) Éric Bernard	Lola-Ford	no time	no time	—

== Race ==
=== Race report ===
At the start of the race, Berger got away well and Senna blocked Mansell the way that Mansell had done to him in Portugal. Elsewhere, Jean Alesi's day ended on the first lap in a cloud of smoke, his Ferrari engine having blown. At the end of lap 1, the order was Berger, Senna, Mansell, Patrese, and Prost. There was a huge accident on lap two when Andrea de Cesaris spun his Jordan while leading other cars, and the resulting accident took Wendlinger, Pirro, and Lehto with him. At the front, Berger pulled off into the lead while Mansell hounded Senna. It all ended on lap 10 when Mansell made a mistake on the first corner and spun off, beaching his Williams in a gravel trap. He was forced to retire after the accident, ending his championship challenge and crowning Senna as Formula One World Champion for the second consecutive year.

With the news of Mansell's retirement, Senna increased his pace and quickly caught Berger, passing him for the lead on lap 18. Senna slowed again at the end of the race, letting Berger through on the last lap to win his first race for McLaren. Patrese finished third followed by Prost, Martin Brundle (scoring the last points in the history of the Brabham team), and Stefano Modena in the Tyrrell. Senna had won his third world championship. This was the last time Senna, Prost, Piquet and Mansell raced together; Prost was dismissed by Ferrari before the final race of the season, which turned out to be Piquet's last.

=== Race classification ===
Pos	No	Driver	Constructor	Tyre	Laps	Time/Retired	Grid	Points
1	2	(Austria) Gerhard Berger	McLaren-Honda	G	53	1:32:10.695	1	10
2	1	(Brazil) Ayrton Senna	McLaren-Honda	G	53	+ 0.344	2	6
3	6	(Italy) Riccardo Patrese	Williams-Renault	G	53	+ 56.731	5	4
4	27	(France) Alain Prost	Ferrari	G	53	+ 1:20.761	4	3
5	7	(United Kingdom) Martin Brundle	Brabham-Yamaha	P	52	+ 1 lap	19	2
6	4	(Italy) Stefano Modena	Tyrrell-Honda	P	52	+ 1 lap	14	1
7	20	(Brazil) Nelson Piquet	Benetton-Ford	P	52	+ 1 lap	10	
8	15	(Brazil) Maurício Gugelmin	Leyton House-Ilmor	G	52	+ 1 lap	18	
9	25	(Belgium) Thierry Boutsen	Ligier-Lamborghini	G	52	+ 1 lap	17	
10	10	(Italy) Alex Caffi	Footwork-Ford	G	51	+ 2 laps	26	
11	14	(Italy) Gabriele Tarquini	Fondmetal-Ford	G	50	+ 3 laps	24	
Ret	26	(France) Érik Comas	Ligier-Lamborghini	G	41	Alternator	20	
Ret	23	(Italy) Pierluigi Martini	Minardi-Ferrari	G	39	Electrical	7	
Ret	19	(Germany) Michael Schumacher	Benetton-Ford	P	34	Engine	9	
Ret	12	(United Kingdom) Johnny Herbert	Lotus-Judd	G	31	Engine	23	
Ret	3	(Japan) Satoru Nakajima	Tyrrell-Honda	P	30	Spun off	15	
Ret	30	(Japan) Aguri Suzuki	Lola-Ford	G	26	Engine	25	
Ret	24	(Italy) Gianni Morbidelli	Minardi-Ferrari	G	15	Wheel	8	
Ret	5	(United Kingdom) Nigel Mansell	Williams-Renault	G	9	Spun off	3	
Ret	32	(Italy) Alessandro Zanardi	Jordan-Ford	G	7	Gearbox	13	
Ret	11	(Finland) Mika Häkkinen	Lotus-Judd	G	4	Engine	21	
Ret	33	(Italy) Andrea de Cesaris	Jordan-Ford	G	1	Collision	11	
Ret	22	(Finland) JJ Lehto	Dallara-Judd	P	1	Collision	12	
Ret	21	(Italy) Emanuele Pirro	Dallara-Judd	P	1	Collision	16	
Ret	16	(Austria) Karl Wendlinger	Leyton House-Ilmor	G	1	Collision	22	
Ret	28	(France) Jean Alesi	Ferrari	G	0	Engine	6	
DNQ	9	(Italy) Michele Alboreto	Footwork-Ford	G				
DNQ	34	(Italy) Nicola Larini	Lambo-Lamborghini	G				
DNQ	35	(Belgium) Eric van de Poele	Lambo-Lamborghini	G				
DNQ	29	(France) Éric Bernard	Lola-Ford	G		Accident		
DNPQ	8	(United Kingdom) Mark Blundell	Brabham-Yamaha	P				
DNPQ	31	(Japan) Naoki Hattori	Coloni-Ford	G				

== Championship standings after the race ==
Drivers' Championship standings

	Pos	Driver	Points
	1	(Brazil) **Ayrton Senna**	91
	2	(United Kingdom) Nigel Mansell	69
	3	(Italy) Riccardo Patrese	52
1	4	(Austria) Gerhard Berger	41
1	5	(France) Alain Prost	34

Constructors' Championship standings

	Pos	Constructor	Points
1	1	(United Kingdom) **McLaren-Honda***	132
1	2	(United Kingdom) **Williams-Renault***	121
	3	(Italy) Ferrari	55
	4	(United Kingdom) Benetton-Ford	37
	5	(Republic of Ireland) Jordan-Ford	13

- Note: Only the top five positions are included for both sets of standings.
- **Bold text** indicates the 1991 World Drivers' Champion.
- Competitors in bold and marked with an asterisk still had a mathematical chance of becoming World Champion.

Previous race: 1991 Spanish Grand Prix	FIA Formula One World Championship; 1991 season	Next race: 1991 Australian Grand Prix
Previous race: 1990 Japanese Grand Prix	Japanese Grand Prix	Next race: 1992 Japanese Grand Prix
