= 1988 Belgian Grand Prix =

- Race 11 of 16 in the 1988 Formula One World Championship
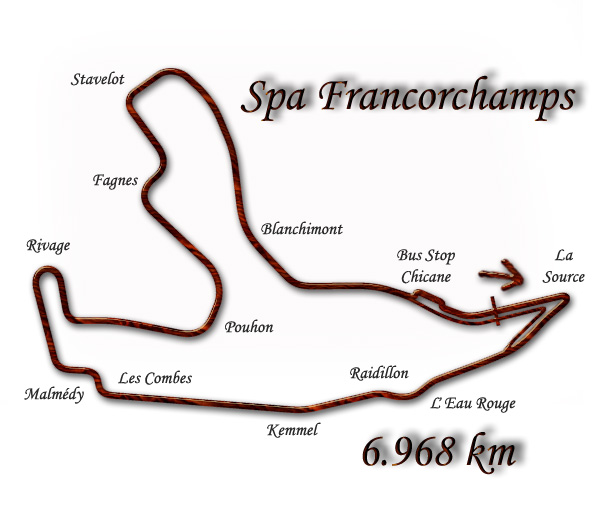

Race details
- Date: 28 August 1988
- Official name: XLVI Champion Belgian Grand Prix
- Location: Circuit de Spa-Francorchamps; Francorchamps, Wallonia, Belgium
- Course: Permanent racing facility
- Course length: 6.940 km (4.312 miles)
- Distance: 43 laps, 298.420 km (185.429 miles)
- Weather: Warm, dry and overcast

Pole position
Driver	(Brazil) Ayrton Senna	McLaren-Honda
- Time: 1:53.718

Fastest lap
Driver	(Austria) Gerhard Berger	Ferrari
- Time: 2:00.772 on lap 10

Podium
First	(Brazil) Ayrton Senna	McLaren-Honda
Second	(France) Alain Prost	McLaren-Honda
Third	(Italy) Ivan Capelli	March-Judd

The 1988 Belgian Grand Prix (formally the XLVI Champion Belgian Grand Prix) was a Formula One motor race held at the Circuit de Spa-Francorchamps on 28 August 1988. It was the eleventh race of the 1988 Formula One World Championship.

The 43-lap race was won from pole position by Brazilian driver Ayrton Senna, driving a McLaren-Honda. Senna's French teammate Alain Prost was second, with Italy's Ivan Capelli third in a March-Judd after the Benetton-Fords of local driver Thierry Boutsen and Alessandro Nannini were disqualified for fuel irregularities.

The win, Senna's seventh of the season and fourth in succession, gave him a three-point lead over Prost in the Drivers' Championship.

== Qualifying summary ==
This was the first race after the death of Enzo Ferrari. Nigel Mansell was forced to miss the race due to chicken pox and was replaced at Williams by Martin Brundle who actually managed to be fastest in the second, wet qualifying session. The McLaren-Hondas had dominated the first qualifying session and occupied the whole front row for the 7th time in 11 races, though neither Ayrton Senna nor Alain Prost could match Michele Alboreto on the uphill Kemmel Straight as he pushed his Ferrari to 312 km/h (194 mph). This was the first race in 1988 where neither of the new EuroBrun cars made the field.

Riccardo Patrese did a fine job to be 5th on the grid in his naturally aspirated Williams-Judd, but his time of 1:57.138 was still 3.420 seconds slower than pole man Senna. Local driver Thierry Boutsen gave the Belgian crowd something to cheer when he put his Benetton-Ford in 6th place on the grid.

The grid was set by Friday's qualifying session as Saturday's qualifying was held in wet conditions. Martin Brundle surprised by being fastest in the Williams, but even more of a surprise was Satoru Nakajima who was second fastest in his Lotus-Honda. Alain Prost, never a fan of driving in the wet and knowing his second place on the grid was safe, did not drive in the second session.

The Minardis of Luis Pérez-Sala and Pierluigi Martini, Stefano Modena in the EuroBrun and Julian Bailey in the Tyrrell all failed to qualify while Modena's teammate Oscar Larrauri failed to pre-qualify.

== Race summary ==
Throughout 1988, Senna had copied Prost's car settings feeling that the Frenchman had a better handle on setting up the McLaren (after driving Prost's spare car in Brazil he found that his teammates settings actually suited his own driving style, plus they were easier on the car). At Spa Prost decided at the last minute to alter the settings on his car by taking off some wing for more straight line speed in a bid to gain an advantage. Unfortunately for the Frenchman this had a detrimental result and he was unhappy with the balance and handling of his car in the race, compared to Senna with Prost's original settings who reported no such problems. At the start, pole sitter Senna had too much wheelspin and Prost was able to take the lead. However, the first time through Eau Rouge, Senna, with better downforce and grip, was clearly quicker and easily retook the lead after he slipstreamed Prost on the Kemmel Straight and out braked him at Les Combes. Senna powered off into the distance while Prost, struggling with a car that was no longer handling to his liking, settled for second place.

Gerhard Berger managed to get his Ferrari up to 3rd, challenging Prost briefly before pitting on lap 3 with electrical problems. He managed to rejoin and set the fastest lap before retiring on lap 12. Due to Berger's retirement, Boutsen climbed to 4th behind Alboreto and ahead of a thrilling battle between Alessandro Nannini (Benetton), Nakajima, Nelson Piquet (Lotus), and the two Arrows-Megatrons of Derek Warwick and Eddie Cheever. Piquet passed teammate Nakajima on lap 17, before the Japanese driver pitted with an acute misfire from a jammed plug, which caused him to retire. In the meantime, Ivan Capelli climbed from ninth to sixth in his March-Judd.

On lap 36, Alboreto's engine blew at Les Combes, sending him out of the race from third. On lap 38, Nannini passed Piquet for fourth at the La Source hairpin, before Capelli overtook the Brazilian driver for fifth on the penultimate lap.

McLaren's 1-2 sealed the Constructors' Championship for the British team with five races remaining. Boutsen and Nannini came home third and fourth for Benetton, with Capelli and Piquet rounding out the top six. In a post-race interview, Prost virtually conceded the championship to Senna, who had won his fourth race in succession and had taken the championship lead for the first time.

== Post-race ==
Both Benettons were later disqualified for using irregular fuel, so the third podium spot went to Ivan Capelli. It was his first podium finish in Formula One and March's first podium finish since Ronnie Peterson had won the 1976 Italian Grand Prix. The post race disqualification of the Benettons also meant that the two Arrows of Warwick and Cheever went into the points.

The disqualification of the Benettons was not made official until long after the season had finished, so many published records list them as having finished third and fourth. The three points Arrows gained from the disqualification brought the team to fifth in the Constructors' Championship.

== Classification ==
=== Pre-qualifying ===
Pos	No	Driver	Constructor	Time	Gap
1	36	(Italy) Alex Caffi	Dallara-Ford	2:01.068	—
2	31	(Italy) Gabriele Tarquini	Coloni-Ford	2:02.101	+1.033
3	21	(Italy) Nicola Larini	Osella	2:02.347	+1.279
4	33	(Italy) Stefano Modena	EuroBrun-Ford	2:02.933	+1.865
DNPQ	32	(Argentina) Oscar Larrauri	EuroBrun-Ford	2:04.208	+3.140

=== Qualifying ===
Pos	No	Driver	Constructor	Q1	Q2	Gap
1	12	(Brazil) Ayrton Senna	McLaren-Honda	1:53.718	2:15.196	—
2	11	(France) Alain Prost	McLaren-Honda	1:54.128	no time	+0.410
3	28	(Austria) Gerhard Berger	Ferrari	1:54.581	2:17.115	+0.863
4	27	(Italy) Michele Alboreto	Ferrari	1:55.665	2:15.667	+1.947
5	6	(Italy) Riccardo Patrese	Williams-Judd	1:57.138	2:15.358	+3.420
6	20	(Belgium) Thierry Boutsen	Benetton-Ford	1:57.455	2:15.236	+3.737
7	19	(Italy) Alessandro Nannini	Benetton-Ford	1:57.535	2:17.077	+3.817
8	2	(Japan) Satoru Nakajima	Lotus-Honda	1:57.616	2:14.739	+3.898
9	1	(Brazil) Nelson Piquet	Lotus-Honda	1:57.821	2:15.027	+4.103
10	17	(United Kingdom) Derek Warwick	Arrows-Megatron	1:57.925	2:16.770	+4.207
11	18	(United States) Eddie Cheever	Arrows-Megatron	1:57.980	2:19.908	+4.262
12	5	(United Kingdom) Martin Brundle	Williams-Judd	1:58.206	2:14.517	+4.488
13	15	(Brazil) Maurício Gugelmin	March-Judd	1:58.361	no time	+4.643
14	16	(Italy) Ivan Capelli	March-Judd	1:58.439	2:22.821	+4.721
15	36	(Italy) Alex Caffi	Dallara-Ford	1:59.736	2:18.052	+6.018
16	30	(France) Philippe Alliot	Lola-Ford	1:59.906	2:21.219	+6.188
17	25	(France) René Arnoux	Ligier-Judd	2:00.037	2:19.260	+6.319
18	14	(France) Philippe Streiff	AGS-Ford	2:00.410	2:23.953	+6.692
19	22	(Italy) Andrea de Cesaris	Rial-Ford	2:00.521	2:17.028	+6.803
20	26	(Sweden) Stefan Johansson	Ligier-Judd	2:00.857	no time	+7.139
21	3	(United Kingdom) Jonathan Palmer	Tyrrell-Ford	2:01.078	2:20.594	+7.360
22	31	(Italy) Gabriele Tarquini	Coloni-Ford	2:01.359	2:19.939	+7.641
23	29	(France) Yannick Dalmas	Lola-Ford	2:01.467	2:19.909	+7.749
24	9	(Italy) Piercarlo Ghinzani	Zakspeed	2:01.899	2:22.064	+8.181
25	10	(West Germany) Bernd Schneider	Zakspeed	2:01.938	2:19.825	+8.220
26	21	(Italy) Nicola Larini	Osella	2:02.029	2:17.127	+8.311
DNQ	24	(Spain) Luis Pérez-Sala	Minardi-Ford	2:02.129	no time	+8.411
DNQ	23	(Italy) Pierluigi Martini	Minardi-Ford	2:02.314	no time	+8.596
DNQ	33	(Italy) Stefano Modena	EuroBrun-Ford	2:02.322	2:19.880	+8.604
DNQ	4	(United Kingdom) Julian Bailey	Tyrrell-Ford	2:02.519	no time	+8.801

=== Race ===
Pos	No	Driver	Constructor	Laps	Time/Retired	Grid	Points
1	12	(Brazil) Ayrton Senna	McLaren-Honda	43	1:28:00.549	1	9
2	11	(France) Alain Prost	McLaren-Honda	43	+ 30.470	2	6
3	16	(Italy) Ivan Capelli	March-Judd	43	+ 1:15.768	14	4
4	1	(Brazil) Nelson Piquet	Lotus-Honda	43	+ 1:23.628	9	3
5	17	(United Kingdom) Derek Warwick	Arrows-Megatron	43	+ 1:25.355	10	2
6	18	(United States) Eddie Cheever	Arrows-Megatron	42	+ 1 lap	11	1
7	5	(United Kingdom) Martin Brundle	Williams-Judd	42	+ 1 lap	12	
8	36	(Italy) Alex Caffi	Dallara-Ford	42	+ 1 lap	15	
9	30	(France) Philippe Alliot	Lola-Ford	42	+ 1 lap	16	
10	14	(France) Philippe Streiff	AGS-Ford	42	+ 1 lap	18	
11	26	(Sweden) Stefan Johansson	Ligier-Judd	39	Engine	20	
12	3	(United Kingdom) Jonathan Palmer	Tyrrell-Ford	39	Throttle	21	
13	10	(West Germany) Bernd Schneider	Zakspeed	38	Gearbox	25	
DSQ	20	(Belgium) Thierry Boutsen	Benetton-Ford	43	Irregular fuel	6	
DSQ	19	(Italy) Alessandro Nannini	Benetton-Ford	43	Irregular fuel	7	
NC	31	(Italy) Gabriele Tarquini	Coloni-Ford	36	+7 Laps	22	
Ret	27	(Italy) Michele Alboreto	Ferrari	35	Engine	4	
Ret	6	(Italy) Riccardo Patrese	Williams-Judd	30	Engine	5	
Ret	15	(Brazil) Maurício Gugelmin	March-Judd	29	Spun off	13	
Ret	9	(Italy) Piercarlo Ghinzani	Zakspeed	25	Oil leak	24	
Ret	2	(Japan) Satoru Nakajima	Lotus-Honda	22	Engine	8	
Ret	21	(Italy) Nicola Larini	Osella	14	Fuel system	26	
Ret	28	(Austria) Gerhard Berger	Ferrari	11	Injection	3	
Ret	29	(France) Yannick Dalmas	Lola-Ford	9	Engine	23	
Ret	22	(Italy) Andrea de Cesaris	Rial-Ford	2	Collision	19	
Ret	25	(France) René Arnoux	Ligier-Judd	2	Collision	17	
DNQ	24	(Spain) Luis Pérez-Sala	Minardi-Ford				
DNQ	23	(Italy) Pierluigi Martini	Minardi-Ford				
DNQ	33	(Italy) Stefano Modena	EuroBrun-Ford				
DNQ	4	(United Kingdom) Julian Bailey	Tyrrell-Ford				
DNPQ	32	(Argentina) Oscar Larrauri	EuroBrun-Ford				

== Championship standings after the race ==
- **Bold text** indicates World Champions.

Drivers' Championship standings

Pos	Driver	Points
1	(Brazil) Ayrton Senna	75
2	(France) Alain Prost	72
3	(Austria) Gerhard Berger	28
4	(Belgium) Thierry Boutsen	20
5	(Italy) Michele Alboreto	16

Constructors' Championship standings

Pos	Constructor	Points
1	(United Kingdom) **McLaren-Honda**	147
2	(Italy) Ferrari	44
3	(United Kingdom) Benetton-Ford	29
4	(United Kingdom) Lotus-Honda	17
5	(United Kingdom) March-Judd	11

- Note: Only the top five positions are included for both sets of standings. Points accurate at final declaration of results. The Benettons were disqualified from this race, and their points reallocated, after the end of the season.

Previous race: 1988 Hungarian Grand Prix	FIA Formula One World Championship; 1988 season	Next race: 1988 Italian Grand Prix
Previous race: 1987 Belgian Grand Prix	Belgian Grand Prix	Next race: 1989 Belgian Grand Prix
