= 1988 Italian Grand Prix =

- Race 12 of 16 in the 1988 Formula One World Championship
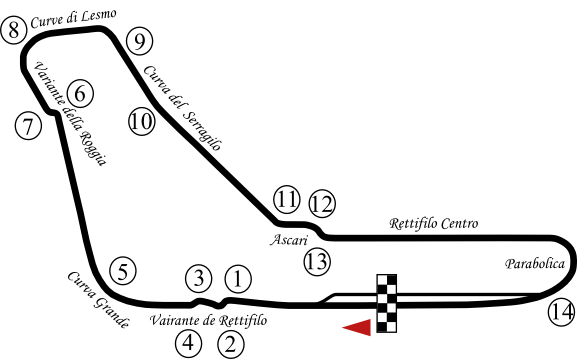

Race details
- Date: 11 September 1988
- Official name: LIX Coca-Cola Gran Premio d'Italia
- Location: Autodromo Nazionale di Monza, Monza, Italy
- Course: Permanent racing facility
- Course length: 5.80 km (3.603 miles)
- Distance: 51 laps, 295.800 km (183.801 miles)
- Weather: Sunny and hot

Pole position
Driver	(Brazil) Ayrton Senna	McLaren-Honda
- Time: 1:25.974

Fastest lap
Driver	(Italy) Michele Alboreto	Ferrari
- Time: 1:29.070 on lap 44

Podium
First	(Austria) Gerhard Berger	Ferrari
Second	(Italy) Michele Alboreto	Ferrari
Third	(United States) Eddie Cheever	Arrows-Megatron

The 1988 Italian Grand Prix was a Formula One motor race held on 11 September 1988 at the Autodromo Nazionale di Monza, Monza. It was the twelfth race of the 1988 season. It is often remembered for the first win and 1–2 finish for the Ferrari team after the death of team founder Enzo Ferrari, and as the only race of the 1988 season that was not won by McLaren-Honda. It is also the only Grand Prix in the 1988 season without a McLaren-Honda driver on the podium, as well as Ferrari's last win at Monza until 1996.

== Report ==
=== Qualifying ===
Qualifying at Monza went as expected with the McLarens of Ayrton Senna and Alain Prost heading the field, Senna the only driver to lap under 1:26. In the first Italian Grand Prix since the death of Ferrari founder Enzo Ferrari, his team's scarlet cars were 3rd and 4th on the grid, Gerhard Berger in front of Michele Alboreto. As a mark of respect for the Ferrari founder, Alboreto and Berger were allowed to be the first cars to take to the track for Friday morning's first practice session.

Showing the difference in horsepower between 1987 and 1988, Senna's pole time of 1:25.974 was 2.514 seconds slower than Nelson Piquet's 1987 time of 1:23.460. For the most part, qualifying times in 1988 had either matched or actually beaten the times from the previous year showing advances in engine response, aerodynamics, tyres and suspension. However, on a power circuit such as Monza, the loss of some 300 hp (220 kW) was very noticeable.

The third row of the grid was a surprise, even at this power circuit. Ever since the item was made compulsory for turbo powered cars at the start of the 1987 season, the Arrows team had been experiencing problems with the FIA pop-off valve on their Megatron turbo engines, the problem being that the valve was cutting in too early and the drivers weren't able to exploit the full available power. In 1987 this meant that drivers Derek Warwick and Eddie Cheever struggled to keep up with their turbocharged rivals. In 1988 it meant they were often only as fast as the leading atmos, and often they were in fact slower, even on noted power circuits such as Silverstone and Hockenheim which should have suited their turbo power. Along with some new turbos, the team's engine guru Heini Mader had finally solved the pop-off valve problem (which turned out to be the pop-off valve being located too high above the engine, a problem Honda and Ferrari had long since solved), and suddenly with an extra 30–50 hp (22–37 kW) at their disposal the Arrows A10Bs were actually 5 km/h (3 mph) faster than the Honda-powered McLarens across the start line and by the time they reached the speed trap before the Rettifilo, Cheever was reported to be the only car to hit 200 mph (322 km/h) while the McLarens and Ferraris were timed at around 192 mph (309 km/h), though even Cheever's speed was some 30 km/h (19 mph) slower than had been achieved by Piquet in a Williams-Honda at the circuit in 1987. This newfound power allowed Cheever and Warwick to line up 5th and 6th respectively, one place in front of reigning World Champion Piquet in his Lotus Honda. This also meant that turbos filled the first seven places on the grid. Piquet's Lotus teammate Satoru Nakajima qualified 10th, with the Lotuses split by the fastest non-turbos, the Benetton-Fords of Thierry Boutsen and Alessandro Nannini in 8th and 9th places on the grid.

Defending World Champion Piquet, the race winner in 1986 and 1987 when driving for Williams, never looked at ease during qualifying at a track where the Honda powered Lotus 100T should have been a long way ahead of at least the 'atmo' cars. Only late on in qualifying was it discovered that the team had inadvertently set up both Piquet and Nakajima's cars with the settings for the Imola circuit and not for Monza (the major differences being higher wing settings for Imola, and almost reversed tyre camber, steering caster and weight distribution with Monza being a clockwise run circuit while Imola runs anti-clockwise).

The 1988 Italian Grand Prix was the last race of the first turbo era in Formula One in which all cars powered by turbocharged engines that entered actually qualified for the race. The McLarens, Ferraris, Arrows, Lotuses, Zakspeeds and the single Osella of Nicola Larini all qualified in the top 20 with the slowest, Larini, being a somewhat creditable (for the time) 4.5 seconds behind Senna and an improvement as the Osella with its ancient Alfa Romeo based V8 turbo had been some +7.572 slower at Hockenheim.

=== Race ===
With emotions running high so soon after the death of Enzo Ferrari, the tifosi had been praying for a Ferrari victory at Monza. However, with McLaren having won all eleven races of the 1988 season up to this point, hopes for a home victory seemed bleak.

Nigel Mansell was still affected by chicken pox and forced to sit out. Martin Brundle, his replacement in Belgium, was asked to race again but his Jaguar Sportscar team boss Tom Walkinshaw vetoed the move, so the second Williams seat went to team test driver (and Brundle's chief rival for the 1988 World Sportscar Championship) Jean-Louis Schlesser.

Prost managed to jump Senna at the start, but as he changed from second to third on the run to the Rettifilo his engine began to misfire and would not run properly again. This allowed Senna to power past into the lead before the chicane. Berger followed Prost with Alboreto, Cheever, Boutsen, Patrese and Piquet running in line. Senna built up a two-second lead after the first lap and Prost, realising after the first lap that the misfire was not going away, decided to turn his boost up to full and give chase to his teammate.

Berger had initially given chase and stayed within a couple of seconds of Prost, but before lap 10 had started to drop back in order to save fuel. By lap 30 the Frenchman had reduced Senna's lead to only two seconds, but as he went by the pits at the end of lap 30 the misfire suddenly got worse and by lap 35 had been passed by Berger and Alboreto and was heading for the pits and his first mechanical retirement of the season (and the only time in 1988 that a McLaren would retire due to engine failure). While this was happening Alboreto, troubled by gear selection problems early in the race, had dropped back from Berger to allow his gearbox oil to cool hoping it would come good. It did and the Italian in the All-Italian car began to charge at the Italian Grand Prix, and was catching his teammate.

Later in the race Berger and Alboreto began closing on Senna rapidly, though it was assumed that Senna was merely pacing himself to the finish, and Senna himself later said that he had things well in hand. With two laps remaining, Senna attempted to lap the Williams of Schlesser at the Rettifilo. Senna headed to the left to pass the Frenchman on the inside of the first chicane, but Schlesser locked his brakes and the Williams slid forward towards the gravel trap. Using his rallying skills, Schlesser managed to collect the car and turned left to avoid going off. Senna, who had taken his normal line and had not counted on Schlesser regaining control, was struck in the right rear by the Williams, breaking the McLaren's rear suspension and causing the car to spin and beach itself on a kerb, putting the Brazilian out of the race. BBC commentator James Hunt placed the blame squarely on Schlesser, although many felt that Senna had not given any allowance for Schlesser to come back on the track. Senna's compatriot and close friend Maurício Gugelmin, whose March-Judd had also been about to lap Schlesser and was behind the McLaren after being lapped on the run past the pits, saw the collision in its entirety. "I think he'd felt that Schlesser would go straight off, and in that situation you have to keep going. It's a difficult situation, but I don't think Ayrton took a risk."

It was generally thought that Senna had used too much fuel in the first half of the race in his bid to keep in front of Prost and that was why the Ferraris were rapidly catching him towards the end of the race, with Berger reducing what was a 26-second gap when Prost retired, to be only five seconds behind when Senna and Schlesser collided 14 laps later. Senna's former Lotus team boss Peter Warr commented after the race that he felt Prost, knowing he wouldn't finish the race, had suckered his teammate into using too much fuel in the hope that it would keep his championship hopes alive. He also added that if Senna had thought about it he'd have realised that to stay close to him, Prost must have also been using too much fuel and that was not something the dual World Champion usually did. Prost's tactics may have contributed to McLaren missing out on a perfect season, but they had the desired effect as Senna scored no points (after four straight wins including Britain where Prost failed to finish) and he was still in with a good chance of winning his third World Championship.

The tifosi were overjoyed as Berger inherited the win, with Alboreto taking second place only half a second behind in the first Italian Grand Prix since the death of the great Enzo Ferrari. Alboreto was actually the fastest driver on the track in the last laps and gained over four seconds on his teammate in the final three laps. American Eddie Cheever (who actually grew up in Rome) finished in third place for Arrows, 35 seconds behind the Ferraris and only half a second in front of his teammate Derek Warwick in a great race for the Arrows team. Warwick had actually got a bad start and had fallen outside of the top ten. However, with the Megatron engine now producing full power the Englishman began to charge and ran the last ten laps challenging his teammate. The remaining points went to Italian Ivan Capelli, a considerable achievement by the atmospheric March-Judd on a circuit which requires powerful engines (Capelli spent the first half of the race locked in a battle for sixth place with the Williams of Riccardo Patrese and Warwick's Arrows). Capelli's high place also showed just how aerodynamic the Adrian Newey designed March 881 was. Sixth place went to the Benetton-Ford of Thierry Boutsen.

Motor racing journalist Nigel Roebuck later reported that after the race an overjoyed member of the tifosi had approached Schlesser, shook his hand and said "Thank you, from Italy".

Another hard luck story was Alessandro Nannini who was forced to start his home Grand Prix from the pits due to a failed throttle on the warm up lap. By the time the Benetton team fixed the problem, Senna was coming through the Parabolica on his first lap meaning the Italian, who was to start ninth, was last and almost a lap down within the first lap of the race. For the rest of the afternoon Nannini charged, setting the fastest lap of the race for atmospheric cars and finishing in 9th place.

=== Post-race scrutineering ===
In the scrutineering bay, Berger's Ferrari's fuel capacity was checked four times. The first time, FISA officials were able to refill the tank with 151.5 litres of fuel, exceeding the limit of 150 litres. A second refill and then a third were undertaken, and still the Ferrari took too much. Eventually they succeeded in adding just 149.5 litres at the fourth time of asking. Eddie Cheever's Arrows had the same problem as Berger's Ferrari when his fuel tank was at first found to be 151 litres, but further checking found it to be under the limit at 149.5 litres.

== Classification ==
=== Pre-qualifying ===
Pos	No	Driver	Constructor	Time	Gap
1	36	(Italy) Alex Caffi	Dallara-Ford	1:30.877	—
2	31	(Italy) Gabriele Tarquini	Coloni-Ford	1:32.860	+1.983
3	33	(Italy) Stefano Modena	EuroBrun-Ford	1:33.292	+2.415
4	21	(Italy) Nicola Larini	Osella	1:33.738	+2.861
DNPQ	32	(Argentina) Oscar Larrauri	EuroBrun-Ford	1:34.044	+3.167

=== Qualifying ===
Pos	No	Driver	Constructor	Q1	Q2	Gap
1	12	(Brazil) Ayrton Senna	McLaren-Honda	1:26.160	1:25.974	—
2	11	(France) Alain Prost	McLaren-Honda	1:26.277	1:26.428	+0.303
3	28	(Austria) Gerhard Berger	Ferrari	1:28.082	1:26.654	+0.680
4	27	(Italy) Michele Alboreto	Ferrari	1:27.618	1:26.988	+1.014
5	18	(United States) Eddie Cheever	Arrows-Megatron	1:28.101	1:27.660	+1.686
6	17	(United Kingdom) Derek Warwick	Arrows-Megatron	1:28.258	1:27.815	+1.841
7	1	(Brazil) Nelson Piquet	Lotus-Honda	1:28.440	1:28.044	+2.070
8	20	(Belgium) Thierry Boutsen	Benetton-Ford	1:29.607	1:28.870	+2.896
9	19	(Italy) Alessandro Nannini	Benetton-Ford	1:28.969	1:28.958	+2.984
10	6	(Italy) Riccardo Patrese	Williams-Judd	1:30.124	1:29.435	+3.461
11	16	(Italy) Ivan Capelli	March-Judd	1:29.513	1:29.696	+3.539
12	2	(Japan) Satoru Nakajima	Lotus-Honda	1:29.541	1:30.570	+3.567
13	15	(Brazil) Maurício Gugelmin	March-Judd	1:30.145	1:30.035	+4.061
14	23	(Italy) Pierluigi Martini	Minardi-Ford	1:30.734	1:30.125	+4.151
15	10	(West Germany) Bernd Schneider	Zakspeed	1:30.773	1:30.161	+4.187
16	9	(Italy) Piercarlo Ghinzani	Zakspeed	1:31.182	1:30.035	+4.061
17	21	(Italy) Nicola Larini	Osella	1:31.721	1:30.481	+4.507
18	22	(Italy) Andrea de Cesaris	Rial-Ford	1:31.263	1:30.560	+4.586
19	24	(Spain) Luis Pérez-Sala	Minardi-Ford	1:30.944	1:30.698	+4.724
20	30	(France) Philippe Alliot	Lola-Ford	1:31.168	1:30.962	+4.988
21	36	(Italy) Alex Caffi	Dallara-Ford	1:30.989	1:31.009	+5.015
22	5	(France) Jean-Louis Schlesser	Williams-Judd	1:31.548	1:31.620	+5.574
23	14	(France) Philippe Streiff	AGS-Ford	1:31.676	1:31.687	+5.702
24	25	(France) René Arnoux	Ligier-Judd	1:32.049	1:32.316	+6.075
25	29	(France) Yannick Dalmas	Lola-Ford	1:32.164	1:32.686	+6.190
26	4	(United Kingdom) Julian Bailey	Tyrrell-Ford	1:32.573	1:32.290	+6.316
DNQ	3	(United Kingdom) Jonathan Palmer	Tyrrell-Ford	1:32.405	1:33.067	+6.431
DNQ	26	(Sweden) Stefan Johansson	Ligier-Judd	1:33.272	1:32.438	+6.464
DNQ	31	(Italy) Gabriele Tarquini	Coloni-Ford	1:32.829	1:35.805	+6.855
DNQ	33	(Italy) Stefano Modena	EuroBrun-Ford	1:34.727	1:33.226	+7.252

=== Race ===
Pos	No	Driver	Constructor	Laps	Time/Retired	Grid	Points
1	28	(Austria) Gerhard Berger	Ferrari	51	1:17:39.744	3	9
2	27	(Italy) Michele Alboreto	Ferrari	51	+ 0.502	4	6
3	18	(United States) Eddie Cheever	Arrows-Megatron	51	+ 35.532	5	4
4	17	(United Kingdom) Derek Warwick	Arrows-Megatron	51	+ 36.114	6	3
5	16	(Italy) Ivan Capelli	March-Judd	51	+ 52.522	11	2
6	20	(Belgium) Thierry Boutsen	Benetton-Ford	51	+ 59.878	8	1
7	6	(Italy) Riccardo Patrese	Williams-Judd	51	+ 1:14.743	10	
8	15	(Brazil) Maurício Gugelmin	March-Judd	51	+ 1:32.566	13	
9	19	(Italy) Alessandro Nannini	Benetton-Ford	50	+ 1 Lap	9	
10	12	(Brazil) Ayrton Senna	McLaren-Honda	49	Collision	1	
11	5	(France) Jean-Louis Schlesser	Williams-Judd	49	+ 2 Laps	22	
12	4	(United Kingdom) Julian Bailey	Tyrrell-Ford	49	+ 2 Laps	26	
13	25	(France) René Arnoux	Ligier-Judd	49	+ 2 Laps	24	
Ret	11	(France) Alain Prost	McLaren-Honda	34	Engine	2	
Ret	30	(France) Philippe Alliot	Lola-Ford	33	Engine	20	
Ret	14	(France) Philippe Streiff	AGS-Ford	31	Clutch	23	
Ret	10	(West Germany) Bernd Schneider	Zakspeed	28	Engine	15	
Ret	22	(Italy) Andrea de Cesaris	Rial-Ford	27	Chassis	18	
Ret	9	(Italy) Piercarlo Ghinzani	Zakspeed	25	Engine	16	
Ret	36	(Italy) Alex Caffi	Dallara-Ford	24	Engine	21	
Ret	29	(France) Yannick Dalmas	Lola-Ford	17	Radiator	25	
Ret	23	(Italy) Pierluigi Martini	Minardi-Ford	15	Engine	14	
Ret	2	(Japan) Satoru Nakajima	Lotus-Honda	14	Engine	12	
Ret	24	(Spain) Luis Pérez-Sala	Minardi-Ford	12	Gearbox	19	
Ret	1	(Brazil) Nelson Piquet	Lotus-Honda	11	Clutch	7	
Ret	21	(Italy) Nicola Larini	Osella	2	Engine	17	
DNQ	3	(United Kingdom) Jonathan Palmer	Tyrrell-Ford				
DNQ	26	(Sweden) Stefan Johansson	Ligier-Judd				
DNQ	31	(Italy) Gabriele Tarquini	Coloni-Ford				
DNQ	33	(Italy) Stefano Modena	EuroBrun-Ford				
DNPQ	32	(Argentina) Oscar Larrauri	EuroBrun-Ford				

== Championship standings after the race ==
- **Bold text** indicates the World Champions.

Drivers' Championship standings

Pos	Driver	Points
1	(Brazil) Ayrton Senna	75
2	(France) Alain Prost	72
3	(Austria) Gerhard Berger	37
4	(Italy) Michele Alboreto	22
5	(Belgium) Thierry Boutsen	21

Constructors' Championship standings

Pos	Constructor	Points
1	(United Kingdom) **McLaren-Honda**	147
2	(Italy) Ferrari	59
3	(United Kingdom) Benetton-Ford	30
4	(United Kingdom) Lotus-Honda	17
5	(United Kingdom) Arrows-Megatron	17

- Note: Only the top five positions are included for both sets of standings. Points accurate at final declaration of results. The Benettons were subsequently disqualified from the Belgian Grand Prix and their points reallocated.

Previous race: 1988 Belgian Grand Prix	FIA Formula One World Championship; 1988 season	Next race: 1988 Portuguese Grand Prix
Previous race: 1987 Italian Grand Prix	Italian Grand Prix	Next race: 1989 Italian Grand Prix
