= 1988 Brazilian Grand Prix =

- Race 1 of 16 in the 1988 Formula One World Championship
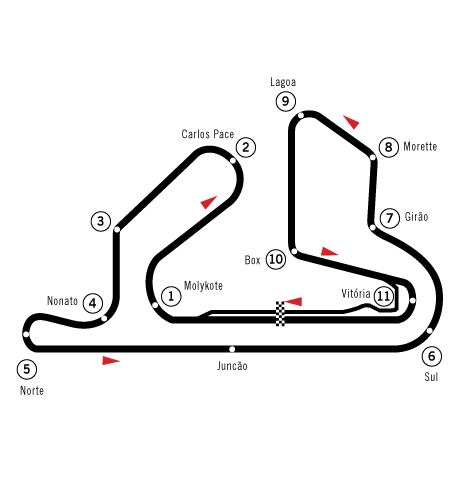

Race details
- Date: 3 April 1988
- Official name: 17º Grande Premio do Brasil
- Location: Autódromo Internacional Nelson Piquet, Rio de Janeiro, Brazil
- Course: Permanent racing facility
- Course length: 5.031 km (3.126 miles)
- Distance: 60 laps, 301.860 km (187.567 miles)
- Scheduled distance: 61 laps, 306.891 km (190.693 miles)
- Weather: Cloudy and hot

Pole position
Driver	(Brazil) Ayrton Senna	McLaren-Honda
- Time: 1:28.096

Fastest lap
Driver	(Austria) Gerhard Berger	Ferrari
- Time: 1:32.943 on lap 45

Podium
First	(France) Alain Prost	McLaren-Honda
Second	(Austria) Gerhard Berger	Ferrari
Third	(Brazil) Nelson Piquet	Lotus-Honda

The 1988 Brazilian Grand Prix was a Formula One motor race held on 3 April 1988, at the renamed Autódromo Internacional Nelson Piquet in Rio de Janeiro. Following his 3rd World Drivers' Championship in 1987 the Jacarepaguá Circuit was named after local hero Nelson Piquet. It was the first race of the 1988 Formula One season.

== Background ==
Winter testing had indicated Ferrari would be maintaining the edge that they had gained by winning the final two races of the 1987 season despite only having an updated version of their 1987 car, with McLaren-Honda and Williams, now with naturally aspirated Judd V8 engines, also producing cars that looked like potential race winners.

Ferrari had dominated the pre-season tests in Rio with times that were not only faster than everyone else, but faster than had been recorded at the 1987 Brazilian Grand Prix, prompting rumors that the team had either shut off the FIA's mandatory pop-off valve which in 1988 limited turbo boost pressure to just 2.5 Bar, or more likely were running the 1987 valve which had a 4.0 Bar limit (although neither Ferrari or Honda gave out official power figures for their engines, most of the team engineers agreed that in 1988 the turbo engines had lost approximately 300 bhp (224 kW; 304 PS) due to the reduction in boost). The rumors were renewed during qualifying in Brazil when neither Michele Alboreto nor Gerhard Berger could get near their test times from a month earlier and both drivers complained of engines that were down on power, too thirsty and had poor throttle response out of the slower corners. With the 1988 pop-off valve connected, both Ferraris were also significantly slower on the circuits long back straight than either the McLaren or Lotus Hondas which were all timed at over 290 km/h (180 mph).

During the qualifying session, there was controversy when Nelson Piquet made comments in the local media publicly insulting Ayrton Senna, though he later claimed he did not know he was talking to a journalist and was forced to withdraw his allegation under threat of a lawsuit (over time, these insults by Piquet – with the aid of Prost – also extended to claims that Senna was homosexual, particularly given his failed marriage in 1982; as it transpired in a 1990 interview of Senna by Brazilian edition of Playboy the gay claim may have been motivated by the fact that Senna had apparently had a relationship with Piquet's wife when she was single). The World Champion had also been insulting about Nigel Mansell's wife Roseanne (calling her an "unattractive boxhead"), and both drivers' families.

BMS Dallara's Alex Caffi had to use a modified Formula 3000 chassis because the Formula One chassis was not ready. As the F3000 chassis could not fit the newer 3.5L Cosworth DFZ engine, the car was forced to use an old Cosworth DFY making it the last time an engine derived from the 3.0L Cosworth DFV engine that had debuted in Formula One in 1967, was used in a Formula One Grand Prix.

Drivers making their debut in Rio were: Brazilian Maurício Gugelmin (March-Judd), Spanish driver Luis Pérez-Sala (Minardi-Ford), Argentine Sportscar driver Oscar Larrauri (EuroBrun-Ford) making his F1 debut at the age of 33, Briton Julian Bailey (Tyrrell-Ford) who had sold just about everything he owned in order to pay for his drive with Ken Tyrrell's team, and young German Formula 3 Champion Bernd Schneider signed with Zakspeed. Of the new drivers, only Bailey and Schneider failed to qualify.

BMS Dallara, EuroBrun (with Larrauri and 1987 International Formula 3000 champion Stefano Modena) and Rial Racing, with veteran Andrea de Cesaris as its sole driver, were making their F1 debuts as constructors. The EuroRacing side of the EuroBrun team had formerly run the factory backed Alfa Romeo team from 1982–85, while Brun Motorsport, run by Swiss slot machine magnate and race driver Walter Brun, were long time competitors in the World Sportscar Championship. Rial, run by German Günter Schmid, was basically a rebirth of his old ATS Team which had previously competed in Formula One from 1977–84. All three teams would use the ubiquitous 3.5L Ford DFZ V8 engine.

== Qualifying ==
Just five months after his crash during qualifying for the 1987 Japanese Grand Prix, Mansell produced a sensational performance to qualify his naturally aspirated Williams second, 1.5 seconds faster than the next 'atmo' car, the Benetton-Ford of Thierry Boutsen in 7th. On the pole was Senna in his first drive for McLaren with a time almost two seconds slower than Mansell's 1987 pole time. The second row was occupied by Gerhard Berger's Ferrari and Alain Prost's McLaren. After only a small amount of testing at Imola before joining in the Rio tests due to the late finish of the car, neither Senna or Prost were happy with the balance of their McLaren MP4/4s in qualifying.

Making Mansell's lap even more impressive was that while the McLaren-Hondas either side of him were hitting over 290 km/h (180 mph) on the 900 metre long back straight, his Williams-Judd was only recorded at 265 km/h (165 mph), slower even than the turbos were recording on the shorter pit straight. It showed just how much wing he was forced to run on his car despite the team continuing to use its computer run Reactive suspension system, though Mansell himself put it down to an underpowered Judd V8 on its race debut.

By qualifying on the front row, Mansell became the first driver of a naturally aspirated (atmo) car to start on the front row of a Grand Prix since his former Williams teammate Keke Rosberg had put his Williams-Ford on pole position for the 1983 Brazilian Grand Prix at the same circuit.

The four non-qualifiers were the Tyrrell-Ford of Julian Bailey, the turbo Zakspeeds of Piercarlo Ghinzani and Schneider, and the turbo Osella of Nicola Larini. Alex Caffi failed to pre-qualify his converted F3000 Dallara.

== Race summary ==
On the parade lap, Senna's gear selector mechanism broke and he had to complete the lap jammed in first gear. The first start was aborted and Senna started in the spare car from the pits. At the second start, Alain Prost with no one in front of him due to Senna's absence, won the start and put in one of his famous first laps that saw him lead by almost 2 seconds, with Mansell in 2nd place, though he was soon passed by Berger's Ferrari. After running in the hot air behind the turbocharged Ferrari, on lap 19 Mansell's temperature gauge showed that the Williams was overheating (at the first aborted start Mansell had been forced to drive off around the track, thankfully without penalty, due to his Judd V8 already overheating on the grid). He entered the pits to investigate, handing third to Nelson Piquet in his Lotus; during the process, Mansell stalled his engine.

Senna was making a remarkable drive from the rear of the grid, climbing to 21st on lap 1 (after almost colliding with the March of his former flatmate Maurício Gugelmin who suffered gearbox failure less than 50 metres after the start of his debut race and pulled to the inside of the track as Senna was leaving the pits), 15th on lap 4, 8th on lap 10, into the points on lap 13 and by lap 20 was in second place after passing Piquet on the back straight following a pit stop to Berger.

In previous years with high horsepower, the Rio circuit had proved savage on tyres and drivers were forced to stop two or three times a race for new rubber. With the reduction of turbo boost in 1988, tyre wear was reduced and McLaren figured on only one stop for their drivers. Prost pitted on lap 26 without losing the lead, and Senna pitted a lap later. During his stop Senna stalled his Honda engine and dropped to sixth place. Shortly afterwards he was shown the black flag and disqualified for changing cars after the green flag had been shown following the parade lap, a move that was not allowed. Over the last 10 laps of the race Berger closed to within 10 seconds of leader Prost, but the Frenchman was merely pacing himself to make sure he finished on the now lower fuel limit and Berger was unable to catch him.

Piquet, the reigning World Champion, came home third in his first drive for Lotus ahead of Derek Warwick in the Arrows-Megatron. Michele Alboreto in the second Ferrari and Satoru Nakajima in the second Lotus rounded out the points with 5th and 6th places. The first atmospheric car to finish was the Benetton-Ford of Thierry Boutsen. Nakajima and Boutsen both finished a lap down on Prost in 7th place. The first race of FISA's new equivalency formula in a bid to make the 'atmos' competitive had seen turbos still take all the points on offer.

== Classification ==
=== Pre-qualifying ===
Pos	No	Driver	Constructor	Time	Gap
1	22	(Italy) Andrea de Cesaris	Rial-Ford	1:37.033	—
2	33	(Italy) Stefano Modena	EuroBrun-Ford	1:37.886	+0.853
3	32	(Argentina) Oscar Larrauri	EuroBrun-Ford	1:38.276	+1.243
4	31	(Italy) Gabriele Tarquini	Coloni-Ford	1:43.869	+6.836
DNPQ	36	(Italy) Alex Caffi	Dallara-Ford	1:46.442	+9.409

=== Qualifying ===
Pos	No	Driver	Constructor	Q1	Q2	Gap
1	12	(Brazil) Ayrton Senna	McLaren-Honda	1:30.218	1:28.096	—
2	5	(United Kingdom) Nigel Mansell	Williams-Judd	1:30.928	1:28.632	+0.536
3	11	(France) Alain Prost	McLaren-Honda	1:31.975	1:28.782	+0.686
4	28	(Austria) Gerhard Berger	Ferrari	1:32.123	1:29.026	+0.930
5	1	(Brazil) Nelson Piquet	Lotus-Honda	1:32.888	1:30.087	+1.991
6	27	(Italy) Michele Alboreto	Ferrari	1:32.523	1:30.114	+2.018
7	20	(Belgium) Thierry Boutsen	Benetton-Ford	1:32.060	1:30.140	+2.044
8	6	(Italy) Riccardo Patrese	Williams-Judd	1:34.070	1:30.439	+2.343
9	16	(Italy) Ivan Capelli	March-Judd	1:33.546	1:30.929	+2.833
10	2	(Japan) Satoru Nakajima	Lotus-Honda	1:33.293	1:31.280	+3.184
11	17	(United Kingdom) Derek Warwick	Arrows-Megatron	1:34.323	1:31.713	+3.617
12	19	(Italy) Alessandro Nannini	Benetton-Ford	1:31.722	1:32.748	+3.626
13	15	(Brazil) Maurício Gugelmin	March-Judd	1:34.037	1:31.833	+3.737
14	22	(Italy) Andrea de Cesaris	Rial-Ford	1:34.988	1:32.275	+4.179
15	18	(United States) Eddie Cheever	Arrows-Megatron	1:33.787	1:32.843	+4.747
16	30	(France) Philippe Alliot	Lola-Ford	1:35.930	1:32.933	+4.837
17	29	(France) Yannick Dalmas	Lola-Ford	1:36.832	1:33.408	+5.312
18	25	(France) René Arnoux	Ligier-Judd	1:37.214	1:34.474	+6.378
19	14	(France) Philippe Streiff	AGS-Ford	1:37.601	1:34.481	+6.385
20	24	(Spain) Luis Pérez-Sala	Minardi-Ford	1:36.593	1:34.532	+6.436
21	26	(Sweden) Stefan Johansson	Ligier-Judd	1:37.454	1:34.579	+6.483
22	3	(United Kingdom) Jonathan Palmer	Tyrrell-Ford	1:38.628	1:34.686	+6.590
23	23	(Spain) Adrian Campos	Minardi-Ford	1:36.593	1:34.886	+6.790
24	33	(Italy) Stefano Modena	EuroBrun-Ford	1:37.506	1:34.910	+6.814
25	31	(Italy) Gabriele Tarquini	Coloni-Ford	1:41.149	1:35.407	+7.311
26	32	(Argentina) Oscar Larrauri	EuroBrun-Ford	1:38.927	1:35.711	+7.615
DNQ	4	(United Kingdom) Julian Bailey	Tyrrell-Ford	1:39.711	1:36.137	+8.041
DNQ	9	(Italy) Piercarlo Ghinzani	Zakspeed	1:40.431	1:37.621	+9.525
DNQ	21	(Italy) Nicola Larini	Osella	1:38.927	1:38.371	+10.275
DNQ	10	(West Germany) Bernd Schneider	Zakspeed	1:45.540	1:38.614	+10.518

=== Race ===
Pos	No	Driver	Constructor	Laps	Time/Retired	Grid	Points
1	11	(France) Alain Prost	McLaren-Honda	60	1:36:06.857	3	9
2	28	(Austria) Gerhard Berger	Ferrari	60	+ 9.873	4	6
3	1	(Brazil) Nelson Piquet	Lotus-Honda	60	+ 1:08.591	5	4
4	17	(United Kingdom) Derek Warwick	Arrows-Megatron	60	+ 1:13.348	11	3
5	27	(Italy) Michele Alboreto	Ferrari	60	+ 1:14.556	6	2
6	2	(Japan) Satoru Nakajima	Lotus-Honda	59	+ 1 Lap	10	1
7	20	(Belgium) Thierry Boutsen	Benetton-Ford	59	+ 1 Lap	7	
8	18	(United States) Eddie Cheever	Arrows-Megatron	59	+ 1 Lap	15	
9	26	(Sweden) Stefan Johansson	Ligier-Judd	57	+ 3 Laps	21	
Ret	22	(Italy) Andrea de Cesaris	Rial-Ford	53	Engine	14	
Ret	3	(United Kingdom) Jonathan Palmer	Tyrrell-Ford	47	Transmission	22	
Ret	24	(Spain) Luis Pérez-Sala	Minardi-Ford	46	Chassis	20	
Ret	30	(France) Philippe Alliot	Lola-Ford	40	Suspension	16	
Ret	31	(Italy) Gabriele Tarquini	Coloni-Ford	35	Suspension	25	
Ret	14	(France) Philippe Streiff	AGS-Ford	35	Brakes	19	
Ret	29	(France) Yannick Dalmas	Lola-Ford	32	Engine	17	
DSQ	12	(Brazil) Ayrton Senna	McLaren-Honda	31	Illegal Car Change	1	
Ret	25	(France) René Arnoux	Ligier-Judd	23	Clutch	18	
Ret	33	(Italy) Stefano Modena	EuroBrun-Ford	20	Engine	24	
Ret	5	(United Kingdom) Nigel Mansell	Williams-Judd	18	Engine	2	
Ret	19	(Italy) Alessandro Nannini	Benetton-Ford	7	Engine	12	
Ret	6	(Italy) Riccardo Patrese	Williams-Judd	6	Engine	8	
Ret	16	(Italy) Ivan Capelli	March-Judd	6	Engine	9	
Ret	23	(Spain) Adrián Campos	Minardi-Ford	5	Chassis	23	
Ret	15	(Brazil) Maurício Gugelmin	March-Judd	0	Gearbox	13	
DNS	32	(Argentina) Oscar Larrauri	EuroBrun-Ford	0	Electrical	26	
DNQ	4	(United Kingdom) Julian Bailey	Tyrrell-Ford				
DNQ	9	(Italy) Piercarlo Ghinzani	Zakspeed				
DNQ	21	(Italy) Nicola Larini	Osella				
DNQ	10	(West Germany) Bernd Schneider	Zakspeed				
DNPQ	36	(Italy) Alex Caffi	Dallara-Ford				

== Championship standings after the race ==
Drivers' Championship standings

Pos	Driver	Points
1	(France) Alain Prost	9
2	(Austria) Gerhard Berger	6
3	(Brazil) Nelson Piquet	4
4	(United Kingdom) Derek Warwick	3
5	(Italy) Michele Alboreto	2

Constructors' Championship standings

Pos	Constructor	Points
1	(United Kingdom) McLaren-Honda	9
2	(Italy) Ferrari	8
3	(United Kingdom) Lotus-Honda	5
4	(United Kingdom) Arrows-Megatron	3

- Note: Only the top five positions are included for both sets of standings.

Previous race: 1987 Australian Grand Prix	FIA Formula One World Championship; 1988 season	Next race: 1988 San Marino Grand Prix
Previous race: 1987 Brazilian Grand Prix	Brazilian Grand Prix	Next race: 1989 Brazilian Grand Prix
