= Tyrrell DG016 =

Formula One racing car

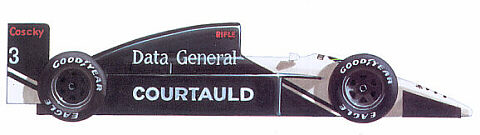
- Category: Formula One
- Constructor: Tyrrell
- Designers: Maurice Philippe (Technical Director); Brian Lisles (Chief Designer)
- Predecessor: 015
- Successor: 017

Technical specifications
- Chassis: Carbon fibre monocoque
- Suspension (front): Double wishbones, pushrods
- Suspension (rear): Double wishbones, pushrods
- Axle track: Front: 1,651 mm (65.0 in); Rear: 1,524 mm (60.0 in)
- Wheelbase: 2,717 mm (107.0 in)
- Engine: Cosworth DFZ, 3,494 cc (213.2 cu in), 90° V8, NA, mid-engine, longitudinally mounted
- Transmission: Tyrrell / Hewland 5-speed manual
- Weight: 500 kg (1,100 lb)
- Fuel: Elf
- Tyres: Goodyear

Competition history
- Notable entrants: Data General Team Tyrrell
- Notable drivers: 3. (United Kingdom) Jonathan Palmer; 4. (France) Philippe Streiff
- Debut: 1987 Brazilian Grand Prix
- Last event: 1987 Australian Grand Prix
Races	Wins	Poles	F/Laps
16	0	0	0
- Constructors' Championships: 0
- Drivers' Championships: 0

The Tyrrell DG016 was a Formula One racing car designed by Maurice Philippe and Brian Lisles and raced by Tyrrell Racing in the 1987 FIA Formula One World Championship.

The DG in the car's name was a reference to the team's major sponsor, Data General.

== Overview ==
The DG016 was raced in two different championships: for 1987 only there was the Colin Chapman Trophy for constructors of cars equipped with naturally aspirated engines. Tyrrell were the only team to run two cars in this category for the entire season and thus easily won this championship, finishing over 100 points ahead of Larrousse-Calmels in second, while Palmer and Streiff finished first and second respectively in the equivalent championship for drivers, the Jim Clark Cup.

The car was also reasonably successful in the main Constructors' Championship, with Palmer and Streiff managing five points finishes between them: Palmer finished fifth in Monaco and Streiff sixth in his home race in France; a large attrition rate in Germany enabled Streiff to finish fourth and Palmer fifth; and Palmer again benefited from attrition to finish fourth in Australia. Palmer came 11th in the main Drivers' Championship with 7 points while Streiff came 15th with 4; the combined 11 points gave Tyrrell sixth in the Constructors' Championship, ahead of such turbo-powered teams as Arrows and Brabham.

This car, paradoxically, represented both a technical advance and an anachronism, because at the same time that the DG016's airbox/engine cover, which connected the top of the roll hoop to the rear end of the bodywork in a continuous curve (anticipating the current configuration of cars with lower air intakes, common from 1989 onwards), being a contrasting design to those of the other naturally-aspirated engine teams of 1987; it was also the last Formula 1 car to use aluminum in its chassis construction (specifically, panels on the underside of the monocoque). AGS initially mounted a large air scoop on top of their car's engine cover before replacing it with a smaller inlet, while March and Larrousse simply removed their engine covers entirely. When F1 mandated naturally-aspirated engines for 1989, the majority of teams adopted a similar design to the DG016.

The DG016 was replaced for 1988 by the Tyrrell 017.

== Complete Formula One results ==
(key)

Year	Entrant	Engine	Tyres	Drivers	1	2	3	4	5	6	7	8	9	10	11	12	13	14	15	16	Points	WCC
1987	Data General Team Tyrrell	Cosworth DFZ; V8 NA	G		BRA	SMR	BEL	MON	DET	FRA	GBR	GER	HUN	AUT	ITA	POR	ESP	MEX	JPN	AUS	11	6th
1987	Data General Team Tyrrell	Cosworth DFZ; V8 NA	G	(United Kingdom) Jonathan Palmer	10	Ret	Ret	5	11	7	8	5	7	14	14	10	Ret	7	8	4	11	6th
1987	Data General Team Tyrrell	Cosworth DFZ; V8 NA	G	(France) Philippe Streiff	11	8	9	Ret	Ret	6	Ret	4	9	Ret	12	12	7	8	12	Ret	11	6th

== Colin Chapman Trophy (for constructors of cars equipped with naturally aspirated engines) ==
(key)

Year	Entrant	Engine	Tyres	Drivers	1	2	3	4	5	6	7	8	9	10	11	12	13	14	15	16	Points	CCT
1987	Data General Team Tyrrell	Cosworth DFZ; V8 NA	G		BRA	SMR	BEL	MON	DET	FRA	GBR	GER	HUN	AUT	ITA	POR	ESP	MEX	JPN	AUS	169	1st
1987	Data General Team Tyrrell	Cosworth DFZ; V8 NA	G	(United Kingdom) Jonathan Palmer	1	Ret	Ret	1	1	2	1	2	1	3	3	2	Ret	2	1	1	169	1st
1987	Data General Team Tyrrell	Cosworth DFZ; V8 NA	G	(France) Philippe Streiff	2	1	2	Ret	Ret	1	Ret	1	2	Ret	1	3	2	3	2	Ret	169	1st
