= Lotus 99T =

Formula One racing automobile

- The 99T of Ayrton Senna on display
- Category: Formula One
- Constructor: Team Lotus
- Designers: Gérard Ducarouge (Technical Director); Martin Ogilvie (Chief Designer); Mike Coughlan (Assistant Chief Designer); John Davis (Head of Aerodynamics and R&D); Tim Feast (Chief Engineer); Osamu Goto (Chief Engine Designer (Honda))
- Predecessor: 98T
- Successor: 100T

Technical specifications
- Chassis: Carbon fibre and Kevlar monocoque
- Suspension (front): Lotus Active, double wishbones, coil springs
- Suspension (rear): Lotus Active, double wishbones, coil springs
- Axle track: Front: 1,791 mm (70.5 in); Rear: 1,641 mm (64.6 in)
- Wheelbase: 2,730 mm (107 in)
- Engine: Honda RA166E, 1,494 cc (91.2 cu in), 80° V6, turbo (4.0 bar limited), mid-engine, longitudinally-mounted
- Transmission: Lotus-Hewland 6-Speed manual
- Power: 900–1,000 hp (671.1–745.7 kW) @ 11,000 rpm
- Weight: 540 kg (1,190 lb)
- Fuel: Elf
- Tyres: Goodyear

Competition history
- Notable entrants: Camel Team Lotus Honda
- Notable drivers: 11. (Japan) Satoru Nakajima; 12. (Brazil) Ayrton Senna
- Debut: 1987 Brazilian Grand Prix
- First win: 1987 Monaco Grand Prix
- Last win: 1987 Detroit Grand Prix
- Last event: 1987 Australian Grand Prix
| Races | Wins | Podiums | Poles | F/Laps |
|---|---|---|---|---|
| 16 | 2 | 8 | 1 | 3 |
- Constructors' Championships: 0
- Drivers' Championships: 0

The Lotus 99T is a Formula One car designed by Gérard Ducarouge for use by Lotus in the 1987 Formula One World Championship.

== Background and design ==
After Renault pulled out of F1 at the end of 1986, Lotus signed a deal with Honda for use of their turbocharged 1.5-litre engine. Due to Honda's existing deal with Williams which allowed that team exclusive use of the 1987-spec RA167E unit, Lotus instead used the previous season's RA166E. As part of the deal, Lotus agreed to sign Honda's test driver Satoru Nakajima as teammate to Ayrton Senna.

Lotus also had a new title sponsor and livery, with the black and gold of John Player Special being replaced by the bright yellow and blue of Camel.

The 99T was the second Lotus chassis to be fitted with electronic active suspension after the team had experimented with the system on the Lotus 92 used in the first part of the 1983 season. The system's benefits of a consistent ride height with no pitch or roll in the chassis came at a cost, as the system added significant weight to the car (approx 25 kg or 55 lb), and also robbed the Honda turbo of approximately 5% of its power (the RA166E was rated at approximately 900 bhp (671 kW; 912 PS) with 1987s 4.0 Bar turbo-boost restriction). Ducarouge clawed as much performance back by spending many hours in the wind tunnel to compensate, although by the end of the season Senna was describing the car as nothing more than the previous year's 98T with a Honda engine instead of the Renault. The 99T was generally regarded as the bulkier of the cars that won a Grand Prix in 1987 with the Williams FW11B, McLaren MP4/3 and Ferrari F1/87 all regarded as better aerodynamically than the Lotus. Despite this, the 99T (especially in Senna's hands) was often among the fastest cars in a straight line, though this was usually put down to the actively suspended Lotus being able to run less wing than its competitors rather than the overall aero effectiveness of the car.

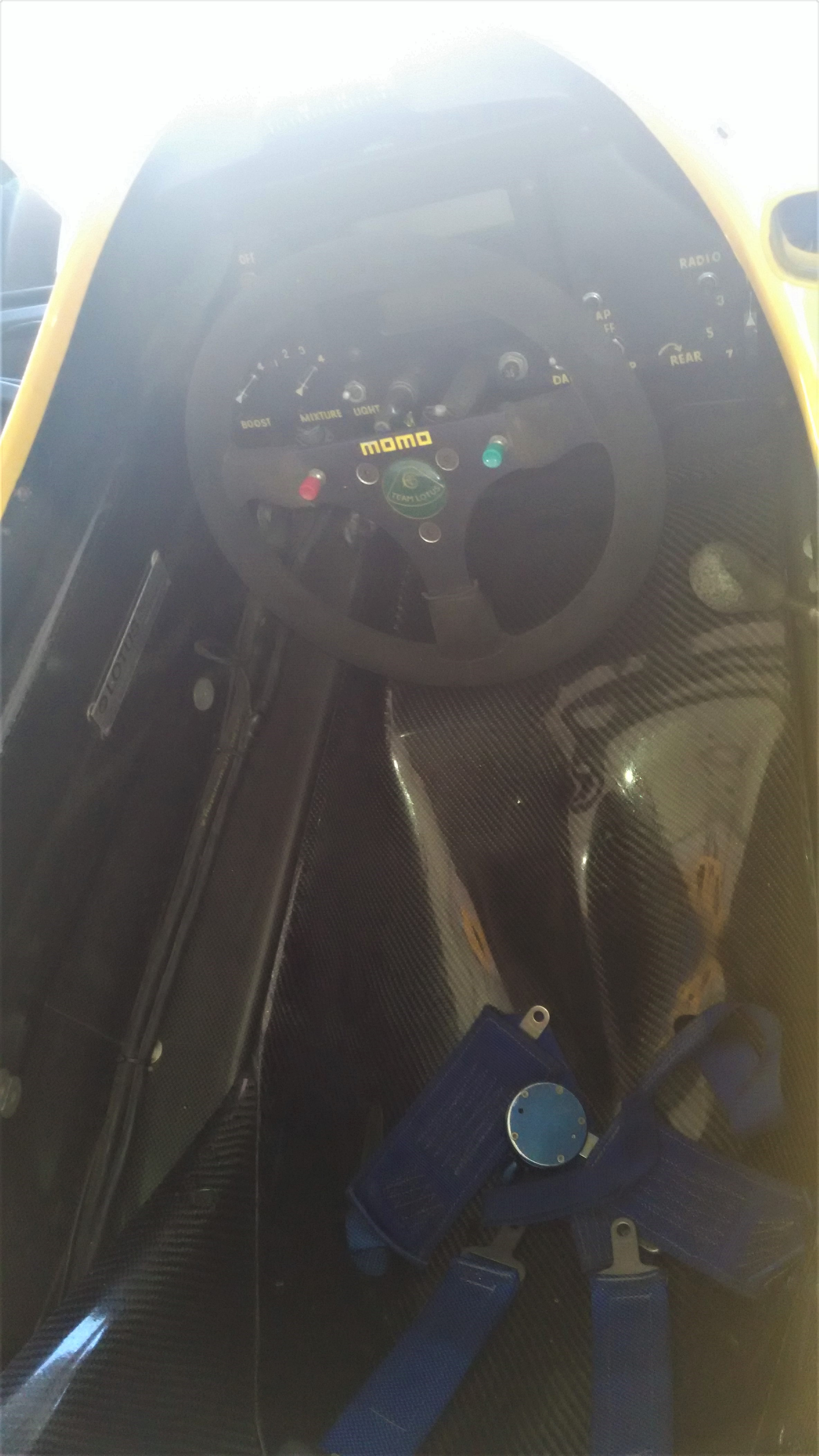
Cockpit of Lotus 99T Formula One car of Ayrton Senna.

After pre-season testing at the Jacarepaguá Circuit in Rio, Senna had insisted on the team using the active suspension throughout the season, feeling that the disadvantage of the older Honda engine would be offset by the benefits of the computer-controlled system, helping to keep Lotus at the front of the field (one of those benefits was that due to less tyre wear, the 99Ts were able to run less wing thus giving greater top speed). However, while the Brazilian was able to take wins on bumpy street circuits at both Monaco and Detroit, the car proved difficult to set up for other circuits.

== Competition history ==
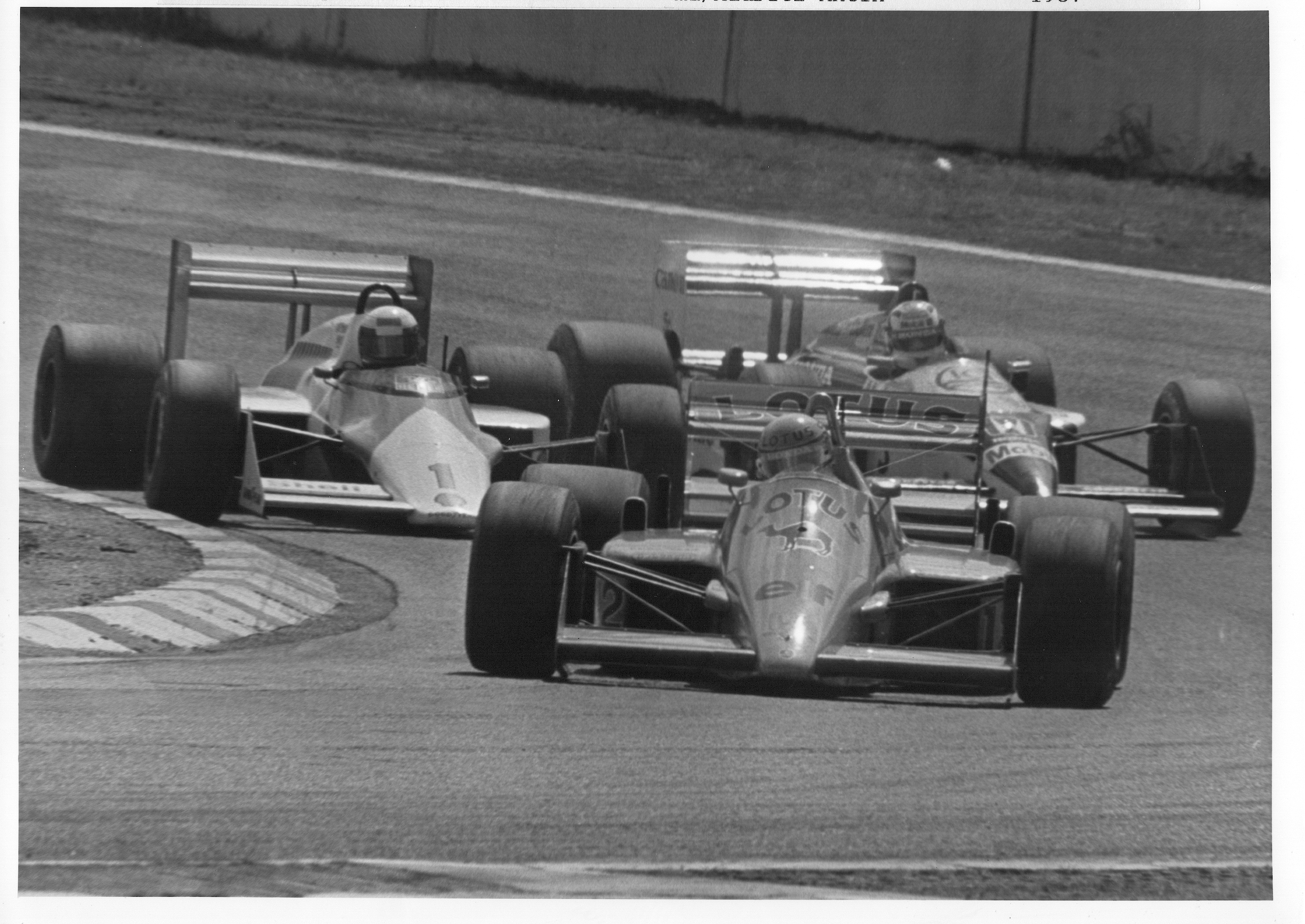
Ayrton Senna of Brazil in his Lotus car leads the pack after the start of the 1986 German Grand Prix in Hockenheim on July 26, 1987. Senna is followed by Alain Prost of France (L) and Britain's Nigel Mansell.

The 99T proved to be competitive in Senna's hands; the Brazilian won twice and scored six other podium finishes during the season, helping him and the team to third in the drivers' and constructors' championships. Senna's win at the Detroit Grand Prix was the final ever Grand Prix win for the team. In Italy, Senna came within a handful of laps of winning the race but on badly worn tyres, he made a mistake which let Nelson Piquet through to take the chequered flag. Senna would move to McLaren (who had secured the use of the Honda engines to replace the TAG engines used from 1983) for 1988 and would win his first World Drivers' Championship. The season was also Senna's second-worst in terms of pole positions, scoring only one in Round 2 at San Marino, his worst season being his rookie year in 1984 with Toleman.

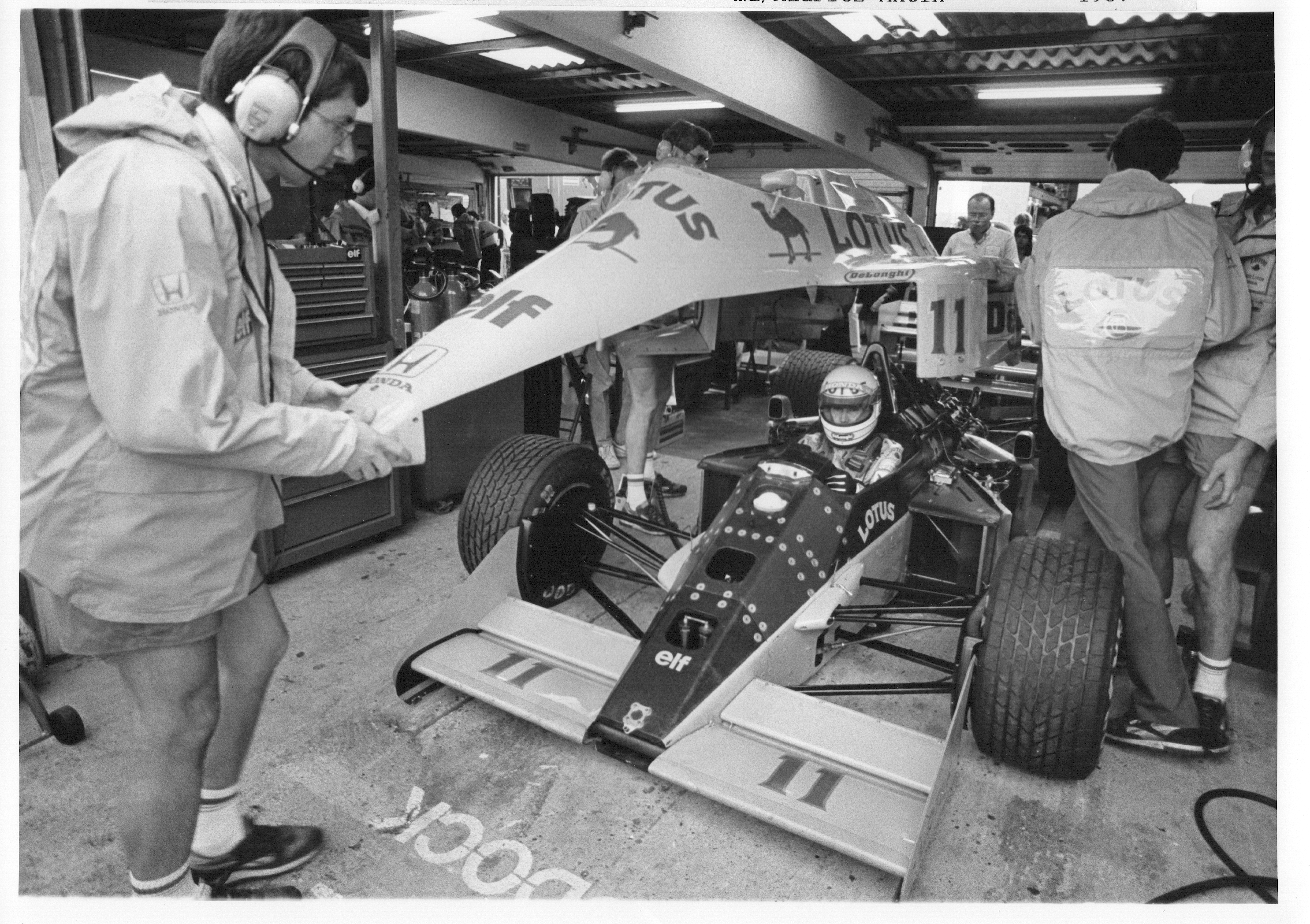
Satoru Nakajima of Japan sits in the cockpit of his Lotus car, as the pit crew puts the car's cover back in Hockenheim, West Germany on July 25, 1987. Nakajima started from the 14th position in the race the next day.

Nakajima, who for his part very much overshadowed by his teammate, proved to be steady if the unspectacular driver. He openly admitted that he favored the faster circuits such as Silverstone, Hockenheim, Österreichring and Monza as well as his home track of Suzuka, but was ill at ease on the tighter circuits. He qualified 17th in Monaco and finished 10th, 24th in Detroit before crashing out on lap 1, and 17th in Hungary before suffering a broken driveshaft on the first lap. Nakajima's best finish in his first season was a 4th at Silverstone for the British Grand Prix. He finished the season in 12th place with 7 points scored. Nakajima's best qualifying performance came in Round 15 in Japan for what was the first Japanese Grand Prix since 1977. At the Honda-owned Suzuka circuit, Nakajima qualified in 11th place, only four places, and 0.962 seconds behind Senna. It was the closest he would qualify to his teammate all season (as it was his home track, Nakajima had actually completed more laps at Suzuka than the entire F1 grid combined). During the season, television viewers were able to get an up-close view of the Japanese rookie's driving as his car usually carried an onboard camera.

The 99T was updated for 1988 to 100T specification; the car technically was virtually unchanged, except for a redesigned nose section, longer wheelbase, and tighter rear bodywork (helped by the reduction of fuel tank capacity from 1987s 195 litres to 150 litres), and the dumping of the active suspension for a more conventional setup. New team leader, 1987 World Champion Nelson Piquet (switching from Williams) used the car to score consistently but was unable to add any further wins to Lotus' score sheet, however, with three 3rd placings his best finishes.

== In popular culture ==
Senna's 99T was included in the Japanese and American versions of the 2001 video game Gran Turismo 3 under the alias "F687/S". The F687/S was the second most powerful Formula One car in the game (next to the F686/M) producing 900 PS (888 hp). The 99T also makes appearances in Rad Racer from Square and Continental Circus from Taito, both released in 1987.

== Formula One World Championship results ==
(key) (results in bold indicate pole position; results in italics indicate fastest lap)

| Year | Entrant | Engine | Tyres | Driver | 1 | 2 | 3 | 4 | 5 | 6 | 7 | 8 | 9 | 10 | 11 | 12 | 13 | 14 | 15 | 16 | Pts | WCC. |
|---|---|---|---|---|---|---|---|---|---|---|---|---|---|---|---|---|---|---|---|---|---|---|
| 1987 | Camel Team Lotus | Honda; RA166E V6 (tc) | **G** | | BRA | SMR | BEL | MON | DET | FRA | GBR | GER | HUN | AUT | ITA | POR | ESP | MEX | JPN | AUS | **64** | **3rd** |
| 1987 | Camel Team Lotus | Honda; RA166E V6 (tc) | **G** | Satoru Nakajima | 7 | 6 | 5 | 10 | Ret | NC | 4 | Ret | Ret | 13 | 11 | 8 | 9 | Ret | 6 | Ret | **64** | **3rd** |
| 1987 | Camel Team Lotus | Honda; RA166E V6 (tc) | **G** | Ayrton Senna | Ret | **2** | Ret | 1 | 1 | 4 | 3 | 3 | 2 | 5 | 2 | 7 | 5 | Ret | 2 | DSQ | **64** | **3rd** |
