= Satoru Nakajima =

Japanese racing driver (born 1953)

- 中嶋 悟
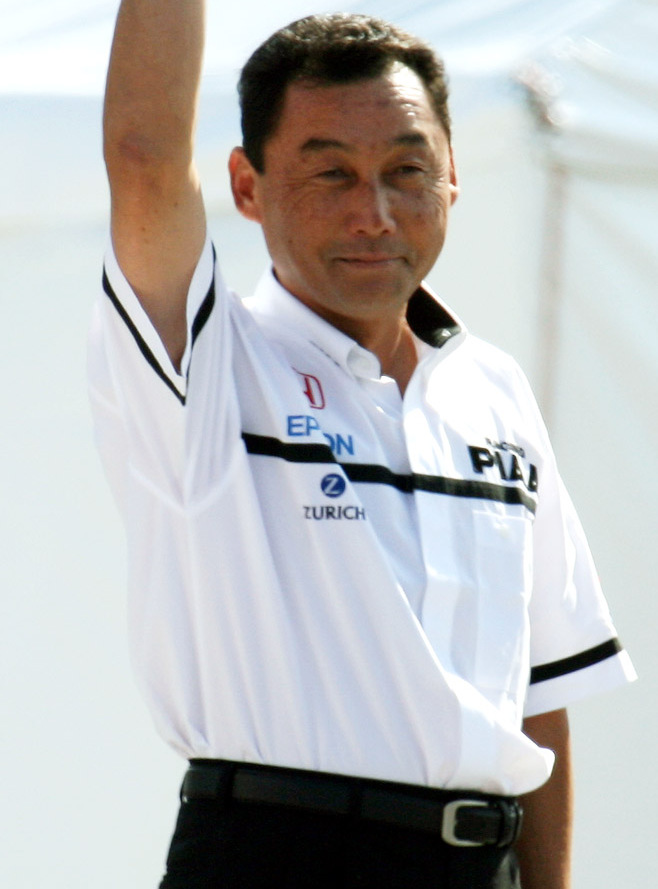
- Nakajima in 2008
- Born: 23 February 1953 (age 73); Okazaki, Aichi, Japan
- Children: Kazuki Nakajima; Daisuke Nakajima

Formula One World Championship career
- Nationality: (Japan) Japanese
- Active years: 1987–1991
- Team(s): Lotus, Tyrrell
- Entries: 80 (74 starts)
- Championships: 0
- Wins: 0
- Podiums: 0
- Career points: 16
- Pole positions: 0
- Fastest laps: 1
- First entry: 1987 Brazilian Grand Prix
- Last entry: 1991 Australian Grand Prix

Previous series
- 1986; 1984–1986; 1984–1986; 1977–1986; 1982; 1979–1981; 1978: International F3000; World Sportscar; All Japan Endurance; Japanese Formula Two; European Formula Two; Formula Pacific Japan; British F3

Championship titles
- 1981–1982, 1984–1986: Japanese Formula Two

Satoru Nakajima (Japanese: 中嶋 悟, Hepburn: Nakajima Satoru; born 23 February 1953) is a Japanese former racing driver and motorsport executive, who competed in Formula One from 1987 to 1991.

Born and raised in Okazaki, Aichi, Nakajima began his racing career at the Suzuka Circuit in 1973. He progressed to Japanese Formula Two in 1977, winning a then-record five titles between 1981 and 1986, with 21 victories across 10 seasons. After several appearances in sportscar racing via the World Sportscar Championship and the All Japan Endurance Championship—as well as a season in International Formula 3000—Nakajima signed for Lotus in 1987 to partner Ayrton Senna, becoming the first Japanese driver to compete full-time in Formula One at the Brazilian Grand Prix. He scored his maiden points finish at the following round in San Marino, and achieved a career-best fourth place at the British Grand Prix.

Across his remaining two seasons at Lotus, Nakajima scored points finishes at the 1988 Brazilian and 1989 Australian Grands Prix, setting the fastest lap and finishing fourth at the latter. Nakajima moved to Tyrrell in 1990, scoring points finishes in the United States, Italy and his home Grand Prix in Japan. Retaining his seat for his 1991 campaign at Tyrrell under Honda power, Nakajima scored his final points at the season-opening United States Grand Prix, leaving at the end of the season to join Honda's works team project. Nakajima tested the RC100 and related models until 1994, when Honda pulled out of Formula One following the Japanese asset price bubble.

Upon retiring from motor racing, Nakajima focused on his Nakajima Racing team, which he had founded in 1984 to privately enter March chassis into the Japanese Formula Two Championship, winning three consecutive titles until 1986. Nakajima won four Formula Nippon Teams' Championship titles between 1999 and 2009, still competing in the newly-formed Super Formula Championship, as well as the Super GT Series. Nakajima's sons Kazuki and Daisuke both became racing drivers, the former also competing in Formula One for Williams from 2007 to 2009.

== Early life ==
Satoru Nakajima was born on 23 February 1953 to a farming family living just outside Okazaki, Japan. He began driving cars in his early teens in the family's garden with his older brother giving him tips, careful that their father didn't catch them. He felt exhilaration behind the wheel of a car, and from then on knew what he wanted to do.

== Career ==
Nakajima started racing after he finished school and passed his driver's licence. In 1973 he was a rookie in the Suzuka Circuit series, which he won. Five years later, he won his first race in Japanese Formula Two. In 1981 he won his first championship, thus beginning a period of domination in the series. He won five of the next six championships, all of them equipped with a Honda V6 engine.

Nakajima participated in 80 Formula One Grands Prix, debuting in the Brazilian Grand Prix on 12 April 1987, bringing Honda engines to the Lotus team. He was 34 years old in his debut race, making him one of Formula One's oldest debutants of the modern era. He finished sixth, and so scored a point, in only his second race, the 1987 San Marino Grand Prix. During his debut season, Nakajima was outclassed by his teammate Ayrton Senna, and many questioned Nakajima's place in F1, stating that if not for Honda he would not have been there on merit.

Honda had originally pushed for Nakajima to replace Nigel Mansell at Williams for the 1986 season (the Japanese company supplied their engines exclusively to Williams from 1984 to 1986). However, Williams owner Frank Williams refused to dump Mansell, who despite scoring only seven points in the first 12 rounds, had finally won his first two races towards the end of the 1985 season. Frank Williams, who was always more interested in the Constructors' rather than the Drivers' Championship, reasoned that having race winner Mansell, and then dual World Champion Nelson Piquet, would give the team its best shot at the Constructors' title, and that the unproven (in F1) Nakajima would struggle (Williams was to be proven correct on this). Lotus were looking for a new engine partner for 1987 as Renault were pulling out of the sport at the end of 1986. Lotus agreed to take on Nakajima replacing Johnny Dumfries in the second seat as a part of the new engine deal with Honda.

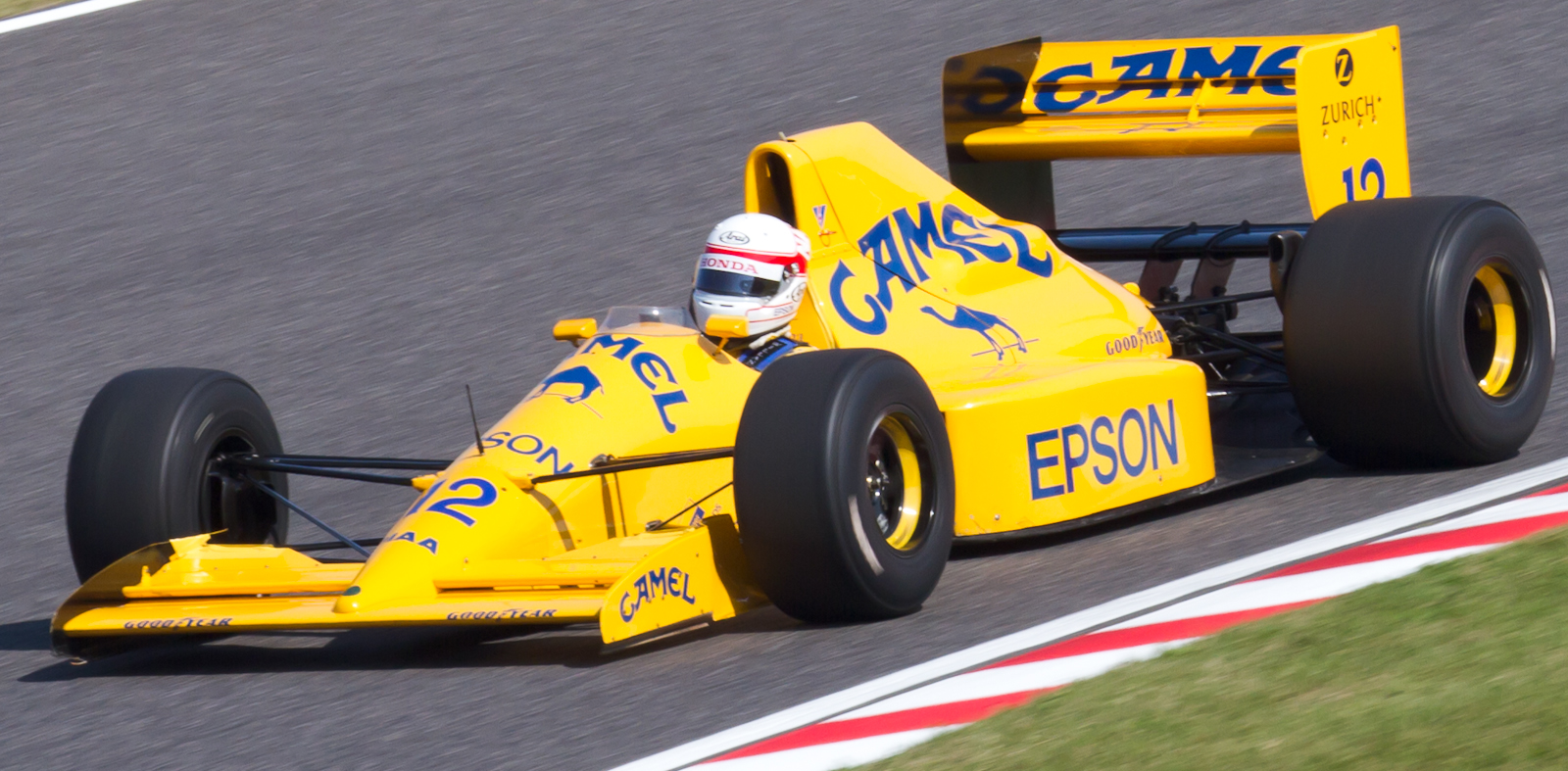
Nakajima driving a Lotus 101, originally used during the 1989 Formula One season, at the 2011 Japanese Grand Prix.

1988 was another miserable year in F1 for both Nakajima and Lotus. In the final season for turbos and using the same V6 engines that propelled McLaren drivers Senna and Alain Prost to win 15 of the season's 16 races, Nakajima scored only a single point during the season finishing sixth in the opening race in Brazil. He also failed to qualify the Lotus 100T at both Monaco and Detroit, the only times between its first race in 1983 and the end of the turbo era in 1988 that a Honda V6 turbo failed to qualify for any Grands Prix entered. Despite this, on occasions Nakajima was able to push his teammate, reigning World Champion Nelson Piquet who had replaced Senna.

Not normally the best of qualifiers or racers despite having equipment superior to most, including the same all-powerful Honda V6 turbo engine as the McLarens, Nakajima could have easily been excused for performing poorly at the 1988 Japanese Grand Prix at Suzuka, if he chose to compete at all. Only 30 minutes before the start of the Friday morning's practice session he was informed that his mother had died that morning (28 October). In the circumstances, his effort in Saturday qualifying to equal his more illustrious teammate's time right down to the thousandth of a second was exceptional. Piquet and Nakajima qualified fifth and sixth respectively, Piquet in front only for having set his time earlier in the last qualifying session. Nakajima was actually faster than the triple World Champion on the Friday, an effort that won the much-maligned Japanese driver new fans and much praise in the F1 paddock.

Despite most believing he did not truly deserve to be in F1, Lotus showed faith in Nakajima when they re-signed him for 1989, even after Honda announced would not be supplying their engines to the team after the 1988 season. This left Nakajima and team-mate Piquet driving the Judd V8 powered Lotus 101 (Nakajima continued to wear Honda patches on his racing suit during the years he did not drive for a Honda-powered team). The pair had a very up-and-down season, with both failing to qualify for the 1989 Belgian Grand Prix, the first time in their 30-year history that Lotus had failed to make the grid, symbolically heralding the beginning of the end for the British team. A great upside to Nakajima's 1989 was a fourth place and fastest lap in the rain-soaked Australian Grand Prix, scoring his only points of the year and also equaling his best career finish, from the 1987 British Grand Prix. Nakajima's race in Adelaide, in which he was dead last at the end of the first lap after a spin soon after the start and only finished 4.648 seconds behind the 3rd placed Williams-Renault V10 of Riccardo Patrese, even drew praise from those who had criticised him in the past such as BBC television commentator and 1976 World Champion James Hunt.

Nakajima joined Tyrrell for the 1990 season (along with the promise of the team using the Honda V10 engine in 1991). He raced for them for two uneventful years at the back of the pack before ending his career. In 1990 he was teammate to young Frenchman Jean Alesi, who scored 13 points (including two second places) to Nakajima's three. In 1991, with the Honda engines used by McLaren in 1990 (and serviced by Mugen Motorsports), he was joined by Italian Stefano Modena. Nakajima was again outscored by his teammate, with Modena scoring ten points and Nakajima's two points coming from finishing fifth in the opening race of the season in Phoenix.

Honda left Formula One a year later to lay the first bricks on a works team, one that they had been working on during the Formula One season, and that CEO Nobuhiko Kawamoto finally admitted to in October. The car, the Honda RC100 was unveiled to the media in February 1993, driven by Nakajima. Shortly afterwards, it passed the Fédération Internationale du Sport Automobile (FISA) crash tests, meaning that the company could enter their team into F1 competition. In an attempt to improve on their previous chassis, Honda built two more, the RC101 and 101B, the latter intended for racing purposes, the former for crash testing. Nakajima had the first public testing of the 101B in Suzuka in January 1994. The company decided against entering its own cars in F1 at this time, instead opting to further their engine development in America with CART, and later, the IRL.

== Personal life ==
Nakajima still lives in his family home near Okazaki. He owns the Nakajima Racing entry in Japanese Formula 3000 / Formula Nippon / Super Formula. Nakajima drivers have won the Formula Nippon championship three times, Tom Coronel doing so in 1999, Toranosuke Takagi in 2000, and Ralph Firman in 2002.

Nakajima's son, Kazuki raced for the Williams team in Formula One in the 2008 and 2009 seasons. Nakajima's younger son, Daisuke, is also a racing driver. He competed in the British Formula 3 Championship in 2009 and 2010. After their careers in open-wheel racing, both turned to sports car racing; Kazuki raced in the FIA World Endurance Championship with Toyota Gazoo Racing while Daisuke raced in Super GT; both have since retired from racing. Kazuki retired after the 2021 FIA World Endurance Championship to take up a managerial role with Toyota Gazoo Racing, while Daisuke retired at the end of the 2019 Super GT Series and has since maintained a low profile.

== Racing record ==
=== Career summary ===
Season	Series	Team	Races	Wins	Poles	F/Laps	Podiums	Points	Position
1977	Japanese Formula Two	Heros Racing Corporation	7	0	0	0	2	52	**3rd**
1978	Japanese Formula Two	Heros Racing Corporation	6	1	1	1	6	67	**3rd**
1978	Vandervell British Formula Three	Nova Engineering	2	0	0	0	0	0	NC
1978	BP Super Visco British Formula Three	Nova Engineering	1	0	0	0	0	0	NC
1979	Japanese Formula Two	i&i Racing Development	6	0	1	0	1	28	7th
1979	Formula Pacific Japan	i&i Racing Development	1	1	1	1	1	15	11th
1979	Macau Grand Prix	i&i Racing Development	1	0	0	0	0	N/A	5th
1980	Japanese Formula Two	i&i Racing Development	5	2	1	1	3	59	**3rd**
1980	Formula Pacific Japan	i&i Racing Development	7	2	2	?	4	57	**2nd**
1981	Formula Pacific Japan	i&i Racing Development	9	2	5	?	7	89	**2nd**
1981	Japanese Formula Two	i&i Racing Development	5	2	0	1	5	79	**1st**
1981	Macau Grand Prix	i&i Racing Development	1	0	0	0	0	N/A	DNF
1982	Japanese Formula Two	John Player Special Team Ikuzawa	6	4	1	1	5	80	**1st**
1982	European Formula Two	John Player Special Team Ikuzawa	5	0	0	0	1	6	13th
1983	Japanese Formula Two	Harada Racing Company	8	2	2	0	3	65	4th
1984	Japanese Formula Two	Heros Racing Corporation	8	4	6	3	6	107	**1st**
1984	All-Japan Endurance Championship	TOM'S	3	0	1	0	1	12	16th
1984	World Sportscar Championship	TOM'S	1	0	0	0	0	N/A	NC
1985	Japanese Formula Two	Heros Racing with Nakajima	8	5	6	3	8	115	**1st**
1985	All-Japan Endurance Championship	TOM'S	5	0	0	0	2	34	9th
1985	World Sportscar Championship	TOM'S	2	0	0	0	1	6	56th
1986	Japanese Formula Two	Heros Racing with Nakajima	8	1	5	4	6	92	**1st**
1986	International Formula 3000	Ralt Racing Ltd	7	0	0	0	0	7	10th
1986	World Sportscar Championship	TOM'S	2	0	0	0	0	2	70th
1986	All-Japan Endurance Championship	TOM'S	1	0	0	0	0	0	NC
1987	Formula One	Camel Team Lotus Honda	16	0	0	0	0	7	12th
1988	Formula One	Camel Team Lotus Honda	14	0	0	0	0	1	16th
1989	Formula One	Camel Team Lotus	13	0	0	1	0	3	21st
1990	Formula One	Tyrrell Racing Organisation	15	0	0	0	0	3	15th
1991	Formula One	Braun Tyrrell Honda	16	0	0	0	0	2	15th

=== Japanese Formula Two Championship results ===
(key) (Races in bold indicate pole position) (Races in italics indicate fastest lap)

Year	Entrant	Chassis	Engine	1	2	3	4	5	6	7	8	DC	Points
1977	Heros Racing Corporation	Nova	BMW	SUZ; 4	SUZ; Ret	MIN	SUZ; 10	FUJ; 5	FUJ; 2	SUZ; 3	SUZ; 5	**3rd**	**52 (53)**
1978	Heros Racing Corporation	Nova Martini	BMW Renault	SUZ; 3	FUJ; 2	**SUZ**; 1	SUZ; 2	SUZ; 2	MIN	SUZ; 2		**3rd**	**67**
1979	i&i Racing Development	March	BMW	SUZ; 12	MIN	SUZ; 11	FUJ; 4	SUZ; 9	SUZ; Ret	**SUZ**; 2		7th	28
1980	i&i Racing Development	March	BMW	SUZ; 1	MIN	SUZ; 1	SUZ; 3	**SUZ**; 6	SUZ; 6			**3rd**	**59**
1981	i&i Racing Development	Ralt March	Honda	SUZ; 3	SUZ; 2	SUZ; 3	SUZ; 1	SUZ; 1				**1st**	**79**
1982	John Player Special Team Ikuzawa	March	Honda	SUZ; 1	FUJ; 6	SUZ; 1	SUZ; 3	**SUZ**; 1	SUZ; 1			**1st**	**80 (98)**
1983	Harada Racing Company	March	Honda	**SUZ**; 1	FUJ; DSQ	MIN; Ret	SUZ; 4	SUZ; Ret	FUJ; 13	SUZ; 1	**SUZ**; 2	4th	65
1984	Heros Racing Corporation	March	Honda	**SUZ**; 1	**FUJ**; 3	**MIN**; Ret	SUZ; 9	**SUZ**; 1	**FUJ**; 2	**SUZ**; 1	SUZ; 1	**1st**	**107 (109)**
1985	Heros Racing with Nakajima	March	Honda	SUZ; 2	FUJ; 1	**MIN**; 1	**SUZ**; 1	**SUZ**; 2	**FUJ**; 2	**SUZ**; 1	**SUZ**; 1	**1st**	**115 (145)**
1986	Heros Racing with Nakajima	March	Honda	SUZ; 2	**FUJ**; 2	MIN; 4	**SUZ**; 1	**SUZ**; 2	**FUJ**; 3	**SUZ**; 2	SUZ; 4	**1st**	**92 (112)**

=== Complete International Formula 3000 results ===
(key) (Races in bold indicate pole position; races in italics indicate fastest lap.)

Year	Entrant	Chassis	Engine	1	2	3	4	5	6	7	8	9	10	11	DC	Points
1986	Team Ralt	Ralt RT20	Honda V8	SIL; Ret	VLL; 5	PAU	SPA	IMO; 8	MUG; 5	PER; Ret	ÖST; 4	BIR; 8	BUG	JAR	11th	7

=== Complete Formula One results ===
(key) (Races in italics indicate fastest lap)

Year	Entrant	Chassis	Engine	1	2	3	4	5	6	7	8	9	10	11	12	13	14	15	16	WDC	Points
1987	Camel Team Lotus Honda	Lotus 99T	Honda RA166E 1.5 V6 t	BRA; 7	SMR; 6	BEL; 5	MON; 10	DET; Ret	FRA; NC	GBR; 4	GER; Ret	HUN; Ret	AUT; 13	ITA; 11	POR; 8	ESP; 9	MEX; Ret	JPN; 6	AUS; Ret	12th	7
1988	Camel Team Lotus Honda	Lotus 100T	Honda RA168E 1.5 V6 t	BRA; 6	SMR; 8	MON; DNQ	MEX; Ret	CAN; 11	DET; DNQ	FRA; 7	GBR; 10	GER; 9	HUN; 7	BEL; Ret	ITA; Ret	POR; Ret	ESP; Ret	JPN; 7	AUS; Ret	16th	1
1989	Camel Team Lotus	Lotus 101	Judd CV 3.5 V8	BRA; 8	SMR; NC	MON; DNQ	MEX; Ret	USA; Ret	CAN; DNQ	FRA; Ret	GBR; 8	GER; Ret	HUN; Ret	BEL; DNQ	ITA; 10	POR; 7	ESP; Ret	JPN; Ret	AUS; 4	21st	3
1990	Tyrrell Racing Organisation	Tyrrell 018	Ford Cosworth DFR 3.5 V8	USA; 6	BRA; 8															15th	3
1990	Tyrrell Racing Organisation	Tyrrell 019	Ford Cosworth DFR 3.5 V8			SMR; Ret	MON; Ret	CAN; 11	MEX; Ret	FRA; Ret	GBR; Ret	GER; Ret	HUN; Ret	BEL; Ret	ITA; 6	POR; DNS	ESP; Ret	JPN; 6	AUS; Ret	15th	3
1991	Braun Tyrrell Honda	Tyrrell 020	Honda RA101E 3.5 V10	USA; 5	BRA; Ret	SMR; Ret	MON; Ret	CAN; 10	MEX; 12	FRA; Ret	GBR; 8	GER; Ret	HUN; 15	BEL; Ret	ITA; Ret	POR; 13	ESP; 17	JPN; Ret	AUS; Ret	15th	2

== Helmet ==
Nakajima's helmet was white with two red lines forming a circular end on the chin area, with a wide line on the rear of the helmet with written NAKAJIMA on it. His son Kazuki Nakajima uses a slightly different version of this helmet.

== Video games ==
Between 1988 and 1994, Nakajima endorsed many Formula One video games for various consoles like Family Computer, Sega Mega Drive, Game Boy and Super Famicom. While most of these games (released by Varie) were only released in Japan, one of the games Nakajima had endorsed for the Mega Drive was released internationally as Ferrari Grand Prix Challenge. He also appeared as a playable driver in his Lotus 100T in Codemasters' F1 2013.

Sporting positions
Preceded by Masahiro Hasemi	Japanese Formula Two; Champion; 1981-1982	Succeeded by Geoff Lees
Preceded by Geoff Lees	Japanese Formula Two; Champion; 1984-1986	Succeeded by Kazuyoshi Hoshino (Japanese Formula 3000)
