= Lotus 100T =

1988 Formula One car

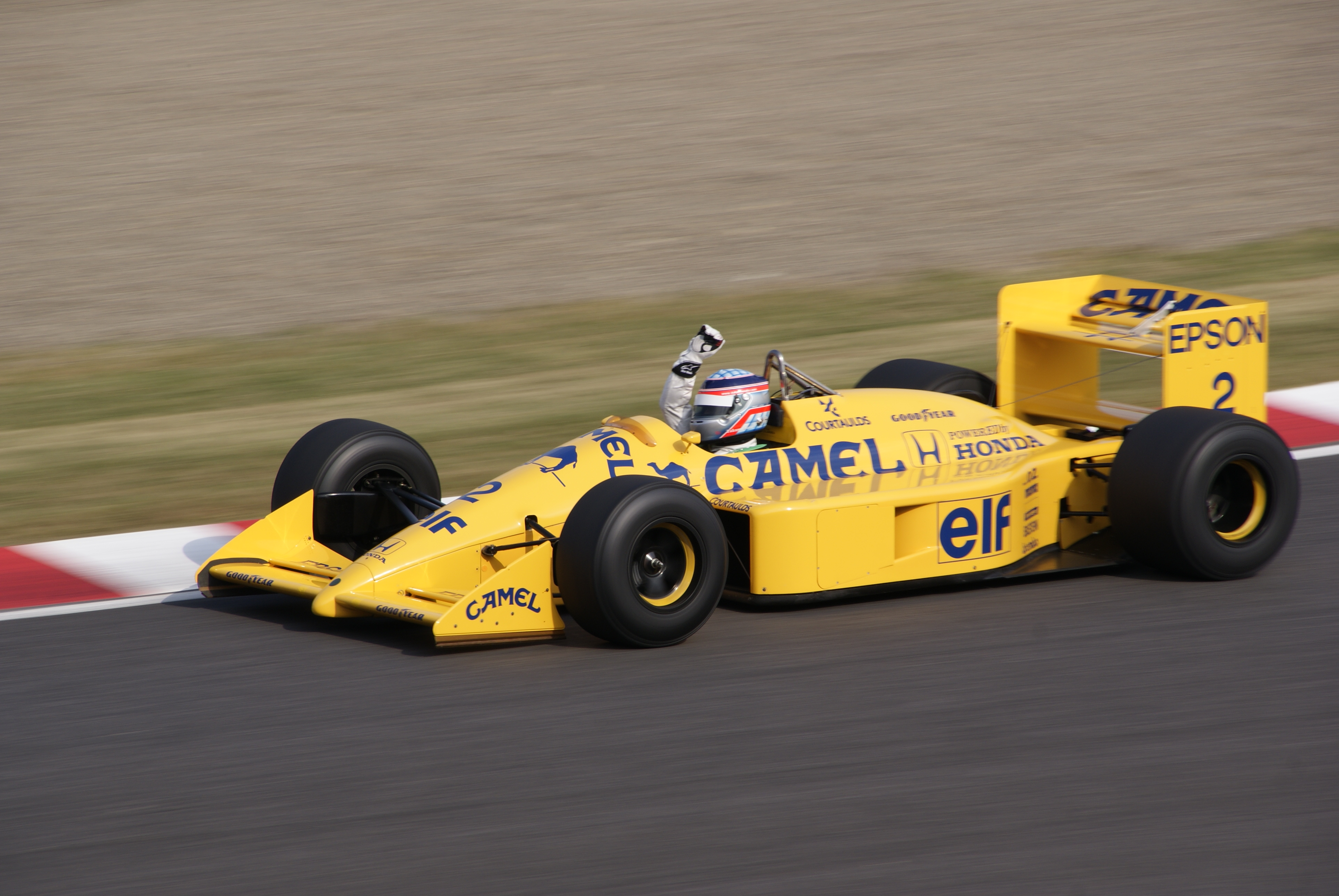
- Takuma Sato driving the 100T before the 2010 Japanese Grand Prix
- Category: Formula One
- Constructor: Team Lotus
- Designers: Gérard Ducarouge (Technical Director); Martin Ogilvie (Chief Designer); Mike Coughlan (Assistant Chief Designer); Tim Feast (Chief Engineer); Osamu Goto (Chief Engine Designer (Honda))
- Predecessor: Lotus 99T
- Successor: Lotus 101

Technical specifications
- Chassis: Carbon fibre and Kevlar monocoque
- Suspension (front): double wishbones, coil springs
- Suspension (rear): double wishbones, coil springs
- Axle track: Front: 1,798 mm (71 in); Rear: 1,651 mm (65 in)
- Wheelbase: 2,776 mm (109 in)
- Engine: Honda RA168E, 1,494 cc (91.2 cu in), 80° V6, turbo (2.5 bar limited), mid-engine, longitudinally-mounted
- Transmission: Lotus-Hewland 6-speed manual
- Power: 640–675 hp (477–503 kW; 649–684 PS) @ 12,300 rpm
- Weight: 540 kg (1,190.5 lb)
- Fuel: Elf
- Tyres: Goodyear

Competition history
- Notable entrants: Camel Team Lotus Honda
- Notable drivers: 1. (Brazil) Nelson Piquet; 2. (Japan) Satoru Nakajima
- Debut: 1988 Brazilian Grand Prix
- Last event: 1988 Australian Grand Prix
Races	Wins	Podiums	Poles	F/Laps
16	0	3	0	0
- Constructors' Championships: 0
- Drivers' Championships: 0

The Lotus 100T is a Formula One car designed by Gérard Ducarouge and Martin Ogilvie for Team Lotus, and used in the 1988 Formula One World Championship. The 100T was an update of the previous Lotus 99T model; technically the car was virtually unchanged, except for the ditching of the active suspension for a conventional setup, and a redesigned nose and rear bodywork. The car was powered by the same, 640 bhp (477 kW; 649 PS), 1.5L turbocharged Honda V6 engine that powered the McLaren team to 15 wins in 16 races in 1988. The car was driven by reigning World Champion Nelson Piquet, and Japanese driver Satoru Nakajima.

== History ==
Unlike its predecessor, the 100T wasn't fitted with electronic active suspension, still an advanced system despite having been introduced on the 99T at the insistence of 1987 lead driver Ayrton Senna who was looking for an advantage. Lotus felt that the weight of the system (approx 25kg or 55lb), along with the Honda having lost around 300 bhp (224 kW; 304 PS) from 1987's figures thanks to the FIA's lowering of the turbo boost limit from 4.0 bar to 2.5 bar, the further loss of approximately 5% of engine power to run the active system was not worth it and reverted to a conventional suspension setup with dampers supplied by Bilstein. However, with the loss of Senna to McLaren, and despite signing triple and reigning World Champion Nelson Piquet as his replacement, Lotus were very much an also-ran team during much of 1988. Piquet picked up a number of points, including three third-placed finishes, during the season, but the car's lack of ultimate speed resulted in Lotus's first season without a win or pole position since 1981. Indeed, when Nakajima failed to qualify the car at Monaco, it became the first (and only) F1 car powered by a Honda turbo engine which failed to qualify for a race. Nakajima actually failed to qualify twice in 1988, also failing to make the grid in Detroit.

Many felt that with Honda power, Piquet should have been able to match the McLarens, or at least be the "best of the rest", though more often than not he wasn't even that, and at times was even shown up by his team mate Satoru Nakajima who many believed would not even have been in F1 had it not been for Honda. Piquet's lackluster season in defence of his championship confirmed the general view that the Brazilian would race to win in nothing less than a top notch car (though he confirmed in a 2012 interview on Brazilian TV that he was "never right" after his qualifying crash at the 1987 San Marino Grand Prix, and only drove from 1988 until his retirement after 1991 "for the money"). The 100T proved it was not a top notch car despite team boss Peter Warr stating in Monaco that "If McLaren can build a fast car then we must be able to as well"; the car's design and production was already compromised by incorrect aerodynamic data during testing and development at the March team's Comtec wind tunnel in Brackley. After Senna had won for Lotus at Monaco in 1987, Monaco 1988 proved a disaster for Lotus. Nakajima failed to qualify while Piquet, who had qualified in 11th place some 4.4 seconds slower than Senna's pole winning McLaren Honda, lasted one lap before retiring with collision damage.

Late in the 1988 season, former three-time World Champion Jackie Stewart test drove the 100T at the Snetterton Circuit in Norfolk, England, which was Lotus's test track at the time. Within a few short laps he identified the car's basic problems. He said that the car lacked rigidity and its chassis was flexing, despite its carbon fibre and kevlar monocoque, and that the chassis couldn't handle the abrupt power delivery of the turbocharged Honda engine which made the car difficult to drive, a common complaint of Piquet and Nakajima, as well as the team's test driver Martin Donnelly. He also noted how cramped the driving position was and that the steering wheel and instrument panel were so close together that it made the panel almost unreadable. Stewart managed to spin and stall the car on one lap at the "Bomb Hole" corner when his driving glove was caught in the small space between the steering wheel and the top of the cowling and had to turn off the engine in order to be able to take his glove off to untangle it. He also said that the car was over-nervous and highly strung, and that "It was not a car that Nelson Piquet would have wanted to drive too many more times" and rated the car as "Perhaps one of the more disappointing cars I drove". When questioned about Stewart's findings during practice for the season ending Australian Grand Prix, Peter Warr refused to say what the Scot had reported, only stating that he had correctly identified problems which the team was already trying to fix.

Nelson Piquet finished the season in sixth place with 22 points in defense of his title, picking up third places in Brazil, San Marino and Australia. Nakajima finished 16th in the Drivers' Championship with one point from his sixth place at the opening race in Brazil. Lotus finished fourth in the Constructors' Championship with 23 points, a massive 176 behind McLaren.

At the end of the 1988 season turbocharged engines were outlawed, rendering the 100T chassis obsolete. It was replaced by the naturally aspirated, Judd V8-powered Lotus 101 for the 1989 Formula One season. And after 5 years at Lotus, Ducarouge left the team.

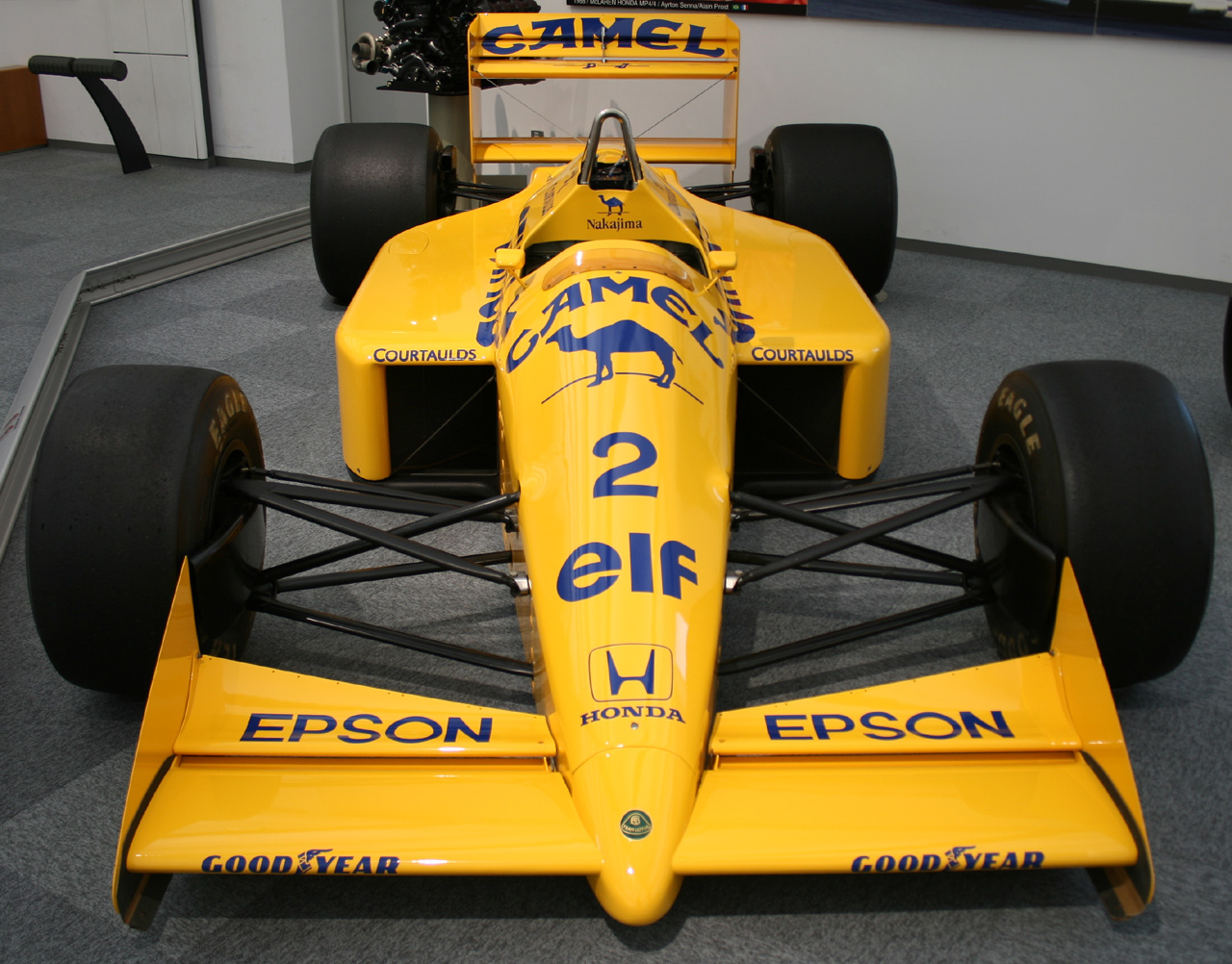
Satoru Nakajima's Lotus 100T on display at the Honda Collection Hall in Japan.

== Complete Formula One results ==
(key)

Year	Entrant	Engine	Tyres	Drivers	1	2	3	4	5	6	7	8	9	10	11	12	13	14	15	16	Pts.	WCC
1988	Camel Team Lotus	Honda RA168E; V6 (tc)	G		BRA	SMR	MON	MEX	CAN	DET	FRA	GBR	GER	HUN	BEL	ITA	POR	ESP	JPN	AUS	23	4th
1988	Camel Team Lotus	Honda RA168E; V6 (tc)	G	Nelson Piquet	3	3	Ret	Ret	4	Ret	5	5	Ret	8	4	Ret	Ret	8	Ret	3	23	4th
1988	Camel Team Lotus	Honda RA168E; V6 (tc)	G	Satoru Nakajima	6	8	DNQ	Ret	11	DNQ	7	10	9	7	Ret	Ret	Ret	Ret	7	Ret	23	4th
