= Lotus 101 =

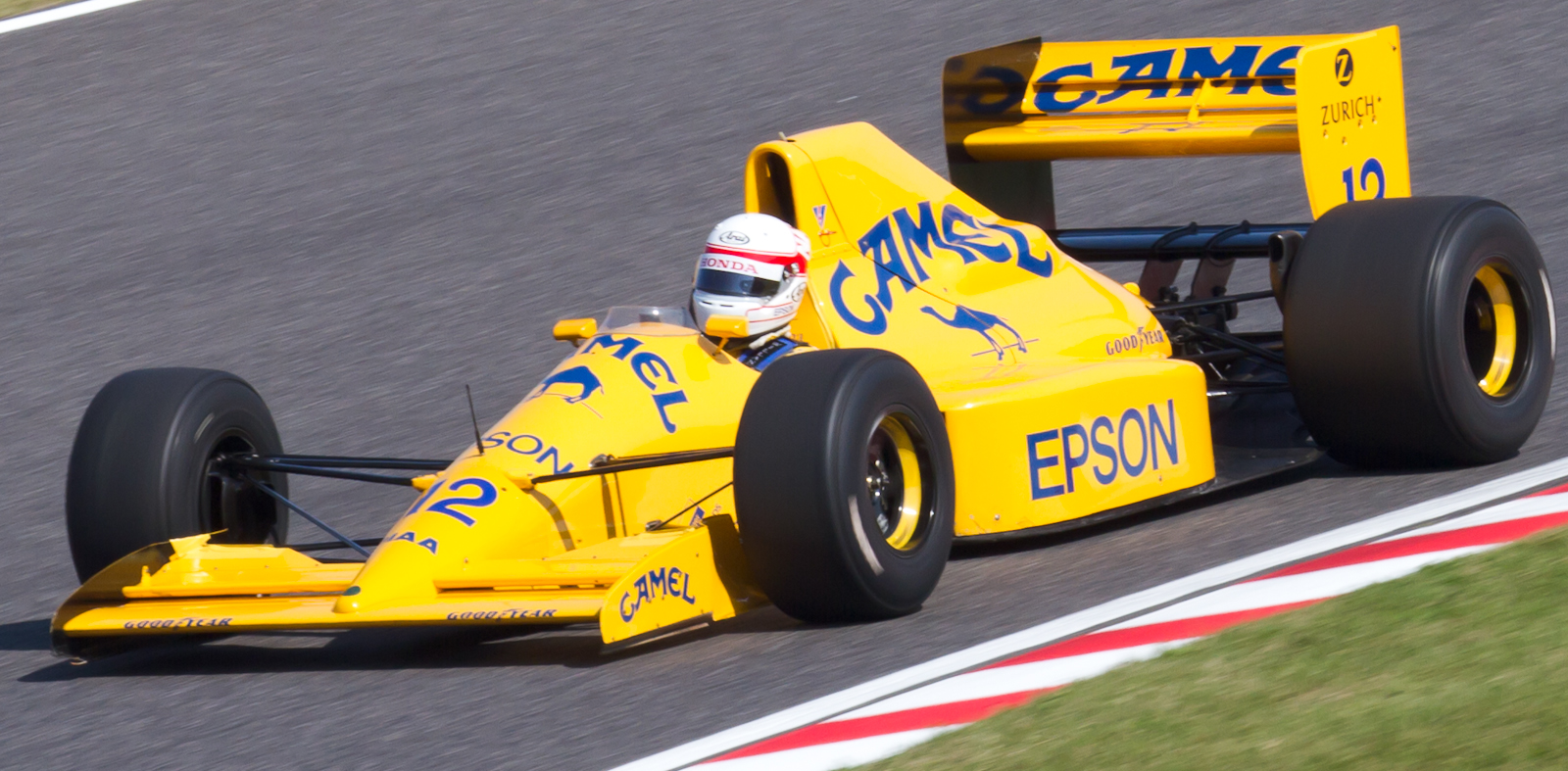
- Satoru Nakajima demonstrating the 101 before the 2011 Japanese Grand Prix
- Category: Formula One
- Constructor: Lotus
- Designers: Frank Dernie (Technical Director); Mike Coughlan (Chief Designer); Tim Feast (Chief Engineer)
- Predecessor: 100T
- Successor: 102

Technical specifications
- Chassis: Carbon fibre and Kevlar monocoque
- Suspension (front): Double wishbones, pull-rod dampers
- Suspension (rear): Double wishbones, push-rod dampers
- Axle track: Front: 1,800 mm (71 in); Rear: 1,650 mm (65 in)
- Wheelbase: 2,900 mm (110 in)
- Engine: Judd CV 3,496 cc (213.3 cu in) 90° V8 NA mid-engine, longitudinally-mounted
- Transmission: Lotus 6 speed manual
- Power: 600–610 hp (447.4–454.9 kW) @ 11,200 rpm
- Weight: 500 kg (1,100 lb)
- Fuel: Elf
- Tyres: Goodyear

Competition history
- Notable entrants: Camel Team Lotus
- Notable drivers: 11. (Brazil) Nelson Piquet; 12. (Japan) Satoru Nakajima
- Debut: 1989 Brazilian Grand Prix
- Last event: 1989 Australian Grand Prix
Races	Wins	Podiums	Poles	F/Laps
16	0	0	0	1
- Constructors' Championships: 0
- Drivers' Championships: 0

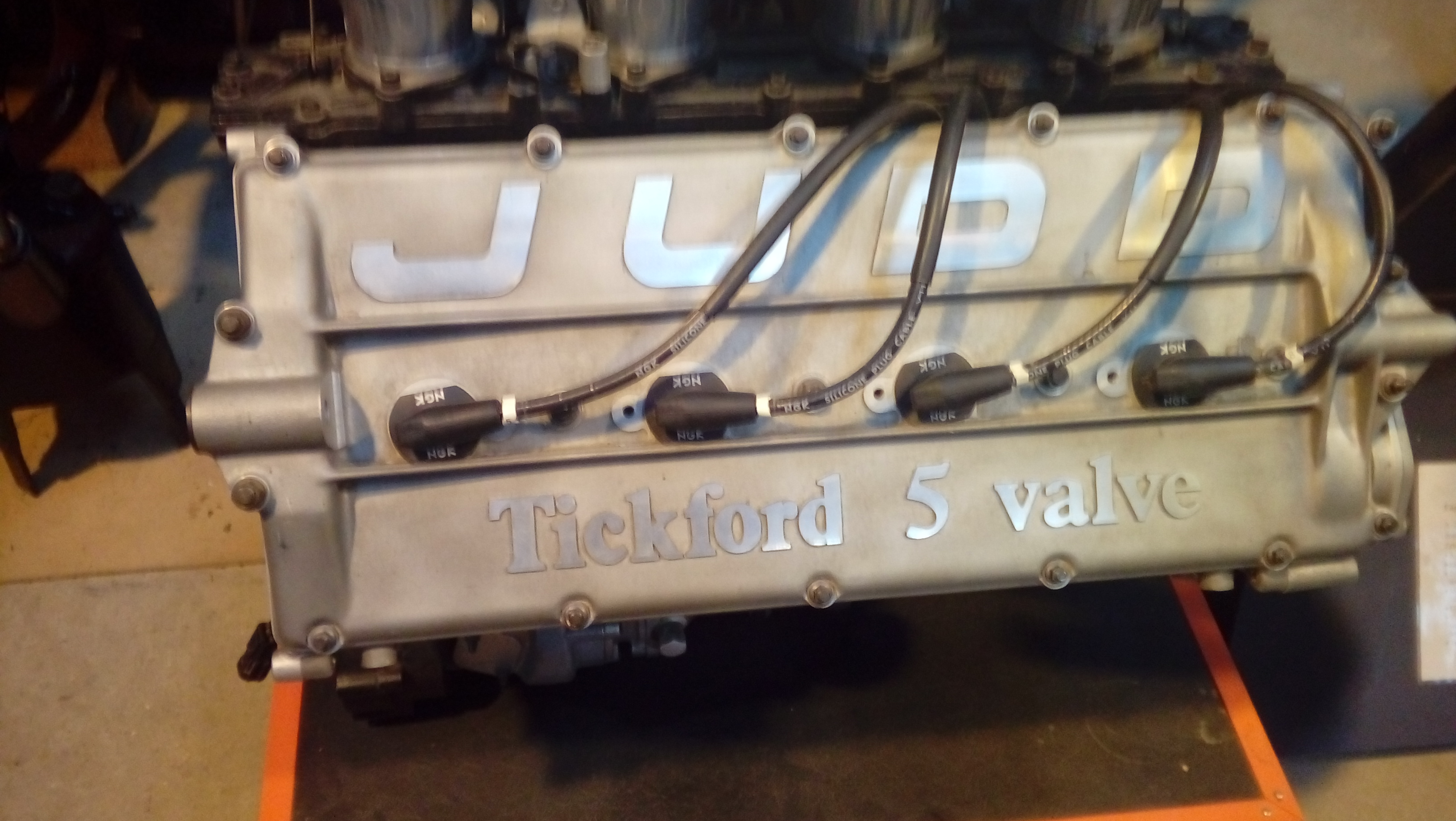
The Experimental Tickford 5 Valve Engine

The Lotus 101 was the car with which the Lotus team competed in the 1989 Formula One World Championship. It was powered by a Judd V8 engine and driven by triple World Champion Nelson Piquet and Satoru Nakajima, in their second and third seasons with the team respectively.

== Overview ==
Gérard Ducarouge's departure during 1988 had necessitated the former Williams aerodynamicist Frank Dernie to be appointed as Technical Director in November 1988. Despite his appointment the majority of the work for the 101 had been conducted by chief designer Mike Coughlan. The 101 was to be a rushed design built within weeks and to a series of constraints.

Ducarouge's departure coincided with end of the 1,500 cc turbocharged era. Lotus, along with other competitors, now had to incorporate 3,500 cc normally aspirated engines into their cars. Judd were therefore enlisted to supply their CV 32 valve V8 engine, but as Lotus were only a "customer" (Judd's principal contracts were the supply of their latest EV V8 engines to the Brabham and March teams) solutions were sought to make up the power deficiency by appointing Tickford to research and develop a version of the Judd engine with a five-valve-per-cylinder head. The use of the Judd engine did permit Dernie and Coughlan to design a smaller and lighter car than before; indeed the narrowness of the cockpit required Momo to build a special steering wheel to allow the drivers to fit their hands between the wheel and bodywork of the car.

The initial optimism and favourable reception by management and driver alike shortly evaporated, as the 101 proved to be a disaster. Not only were the customer Judd engines rated at around 610 bhp (455 kW) (about 80 bhp (60 kW) less than the dominant Honda V10 engine used by McLaren), but it was apparent that the Goodyear tyres that the team were using had been designed principally for use by the McLaren and Ferrari teams, who, in addition to having heavier and more powerful engines (which allowed the tyres to heat up faster) were able to test and tune their chassis to work better with the compounds.

The 101 failed to collect significant results as the season progressed, culminating in the events following the British Grand Prix where Nelson Piquet had driven to a fighting fourth-placed finish. The Chapman family, who were still the shareholders in Team Lotus International, persuaded Peter Warr and Chairman Fred Bushell (who was about to face charges arising from the DeLorean affair) to leave. Tony Rudd, who was at the time working for Group Lotus, was appointed executive chairman. Also the Tickford head was abandoned.

The renewed optimism briefly helped to improve results; however, at Spa both Lotuses failed to qualify for a Grand Prix for the first time since 1958. The season ended with two fourth-place finishes for Nelson Piquet and Satoru Nakajima in Japan and Australia respectively. Nakajima also snatched the fastest lap in the torrential rain of Adelaide.

Given the dreadful start to the season (Lotus only scored points in one of the first seven races), the total points tally of 15 points was almost a positive Lotus could take out of the 1989 season. Indeed, it would prove to be the highest number of points Lotus were to score in a season during the normally aspirated engine era until the team's collapse at the end of the 1994 season.

== Complete Formula One results ==
(key) (Results in italics indicate fastest lap)

Year	Entrant	Engine	Tyres	Drivers	1	2	3	4	5	6	7	8	9	10	11	12	13	14	15	16	Pts.	WCC
1989	Camel Team Lotus	Judd CV; V8	G		BRA	SMR	MON	MEX	USA	CAN	FRA	GBR	GER	HUN	BEL	ITA	POR	ESP	JPN	AUS	15	6th
1989	Camel Team Lotus	Judd CV; V8	G	Nelson Piquet	Ret	Ret	Ret	11	Ret	4	8	4	5	6	DNQ	Ret	Ret	8	4	Ret	15	6th
1989	Camel Team Lotus	Judd CV; V8	G	Satoru Nakajima	8	NC	DNQ	Ret	Ret	DNQ	Ret	8	Ret	Ret	DNQ	10	7	Ret	Ret	4	15	6th
