= Honda RA16 engine =

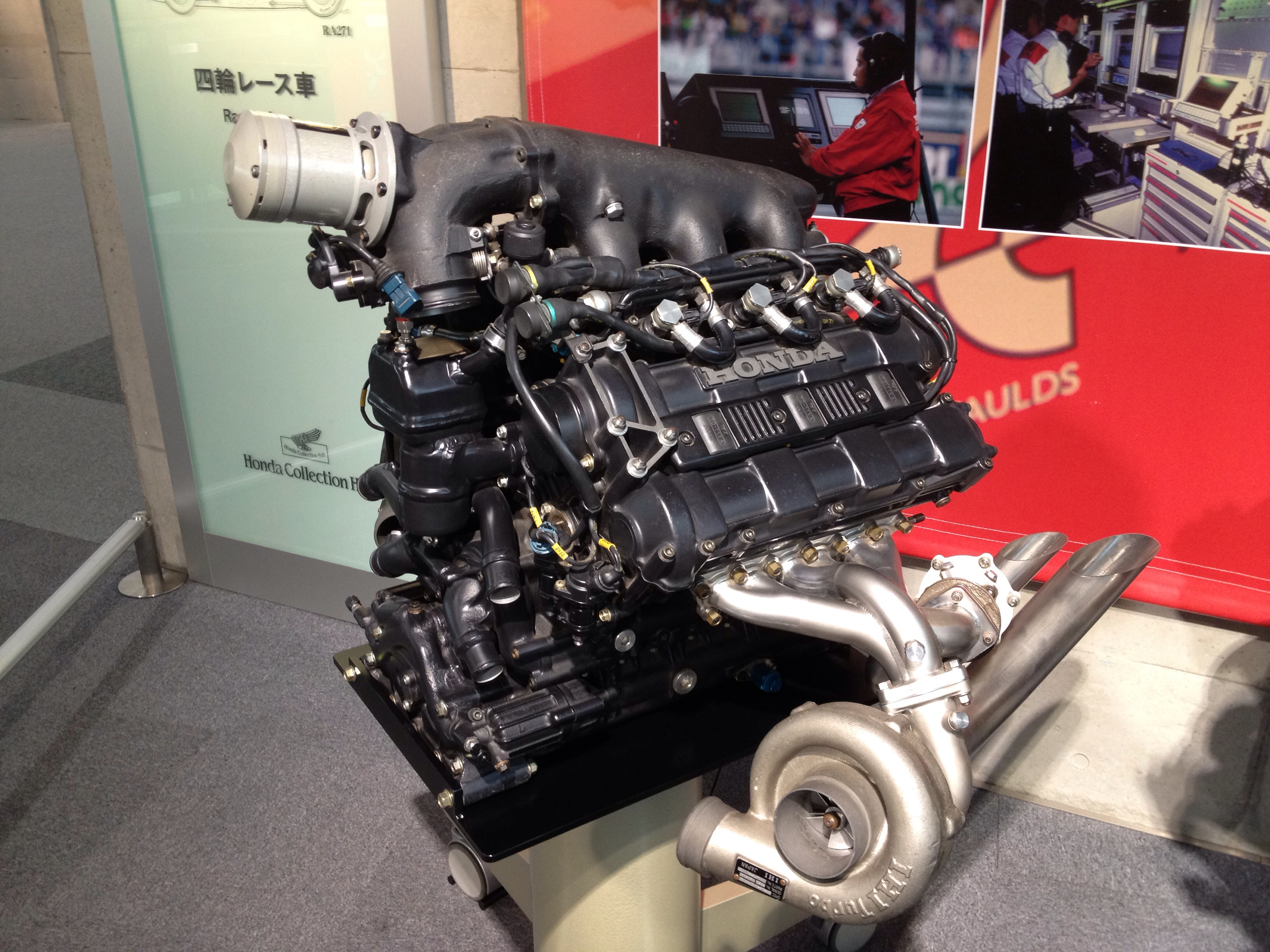
- Honda RA168E (1988)

Overview
- Manufacturer: Honda
- Designer: Nobuhiko Kawamoto; Osamu Goto
- Production: 1983–1988

Layout
- Configuration: 80° V-6
- Displacement: 1.5 L (1,496 cc); 1.5 L (1,498 cc); 1.5 L (1,494 cc)
- Cylinder bore: 90 mm (3.5 in); 82 mm (3.2 in); 79 mm (3.1 in)
- Piston stroke: 39.2 mm (1.5 in); 47.3 mm (1.9 in); 50.8 mm (2.0 in)
- Valvetrain: 24-valve, DOHC, four-valves per cylinder

Combustion
- Turbocharger: Honda
- Fuel system: Fuel injection
- Fuel type: Gasoline
- Oil system: Dry sump

Output
- Power output: 600–1,350 hp (447–1,007 kW)
- Torque output: 312–650 lb⋅ft (423–881 N⋅m)

Chronology
- Successor: Honda V10 engine

The Honda RA16 engine is a turbocharged, 1.5-litre (91ci) 80-degree, V-6 racing engine, designed for use in Formula One between 1983 and 1988. The customer engines were used by Spirit, Williams, Lotus, and McLaren.

== Overview ==
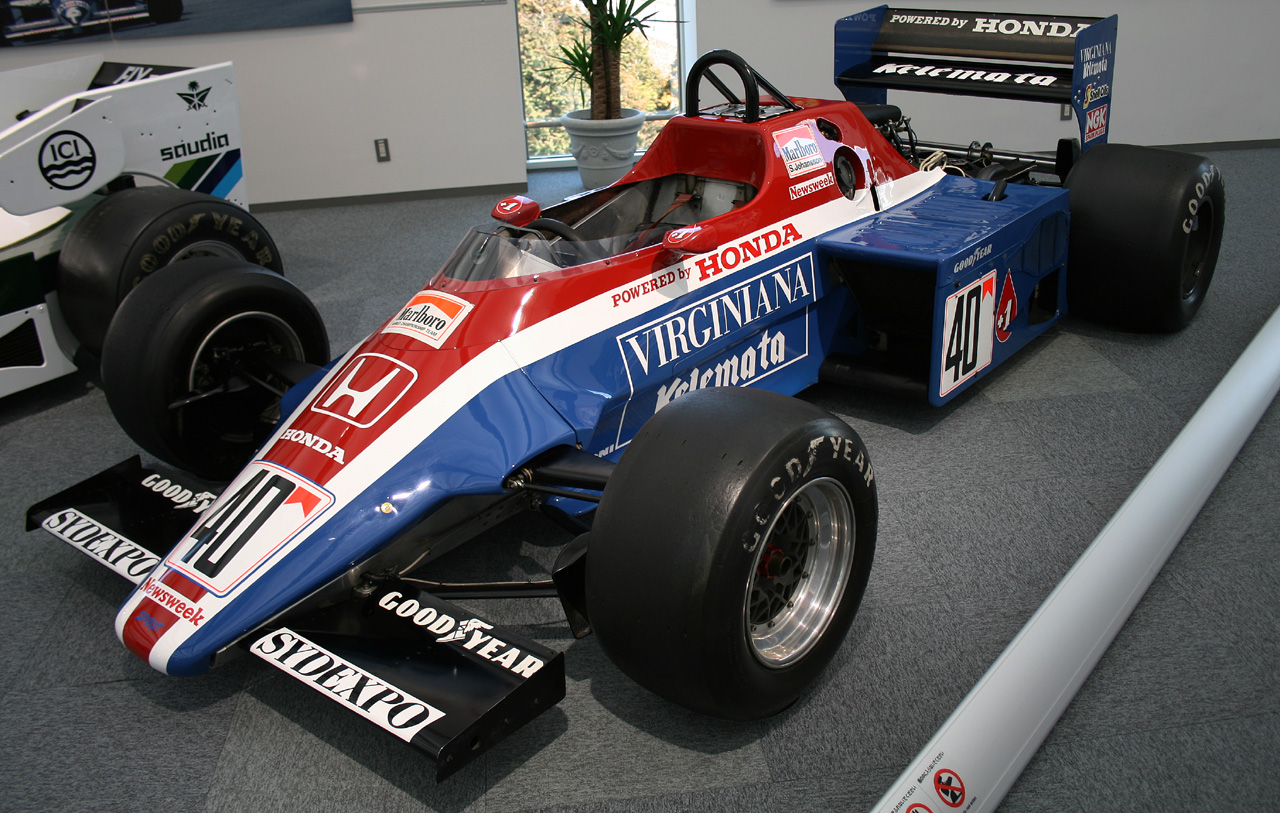
The Honda RA16 turbo engine made its F1 World Championship debut at the 1983 British Grand Prix at Silverstone powering the Spirit 201.

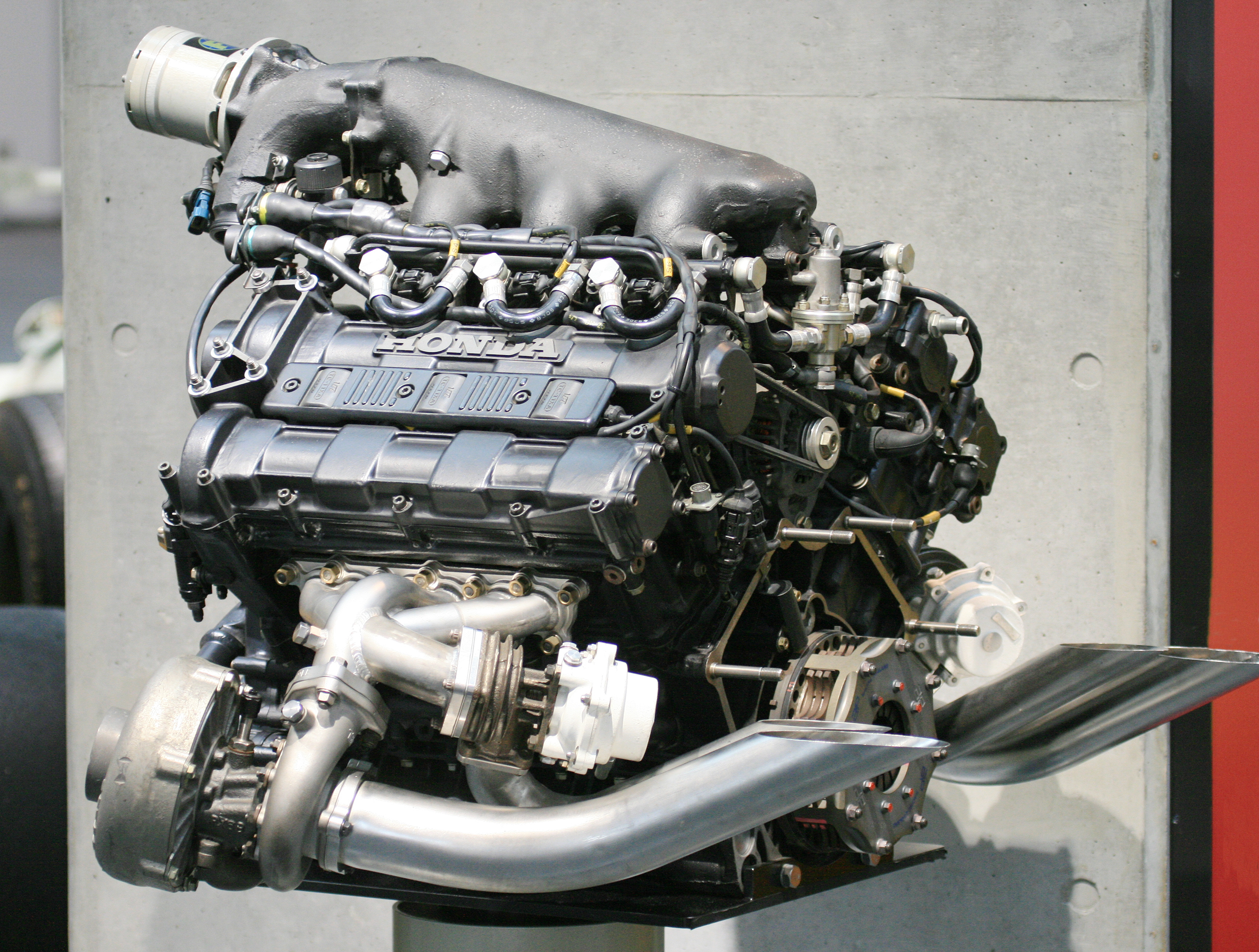
The all-conquering Honda RA168E V6 turbo used in the McLaren MP4/4 and Lotus 100T in 1988.

Honda returned to Formula One in 1983 as an engine supplier for Spirit and stayed in the sport for a decade, at various times teaming with Williams (1983–87), Lotus (1987–88), McLaren (1988–92) and finally Tyrrell (1991). Though they often supplied their engines to more than one team per season, Honda did not always supply the same specification engines to different teams in the same season. For example, in 1987 as Williams had an existing contract, they were supplied with the latest 1.5-litre RA167E V6 engine, while Lotus was supplied with the 1986 RA166E engine which had to be adapted to a lower fuel limit and turbo boost restriction, thus limiting its effectiveness, though, for the last year of the original turbo era in 1988, both Lotus and McLaren used the same specification RA168E.

As an engine supplier, Honda made its World Championship debut with Spirit's Swedish driver Stefan Johansson at the 1983 British Grand Prix at Silverstone. Johansson qualified in an encouraging 14th place (although some 4.5 seconds slower than pole), though he would retire after just 5 laps with fuel problems. Johansson had given the Honda its on-track debut earlier in the year at the non-championship 1983 Race of Champions at Brands Hatch (the last non-championship race in F1 history) where despite unreliability, the 1.5-litre turbocharged V6 engine dubbed the RA163E had impressed with its speed. By the final race of the 1983 season in South Africa, Honda had begun its association with Williams where reigning (and outgoing) World Champion Keke Rosberg served notice that the Honda was on the pace by qualifying 6th, only 7/10s slower than the Ferrari of pole winner Patrick Tambay.

Rosberg would give Honda its first win as an engine supplier when he outlasted the field to win the 1984 Dallas Grand Prix and by the end of the 1985 season where Briton Nigel Mansell and Rosberg won the final 3 races of the season (Rosberg had already won that year's Detroit Grand Prix), it was clear that Honda had the engine to beat in Formula One.

At their peak (1986–1988), Honda engines were considered the ticket to Grand Prix glory due to their power, reliability, sophistication, and winning track record. Honda's commitment to F1 was such that Nigel Mansell, who drove Honda-powered Williams cars from 1985 to 1987 recalled in a 2011 interview that Honda was making and developing 4 to 6 totally different engines in a single season. Honda won six consecutive constructors' championships as an engine manufacturer (two with Williams between 1986 and 1987 and four with McLaren between 1988 and 1991), as well as five consecutive drivers' championships (one by Nelson Piquet in 1987, one by Alain Prost in 1989, and three by Ayrton Senna in 1988, 1990 and 1991).

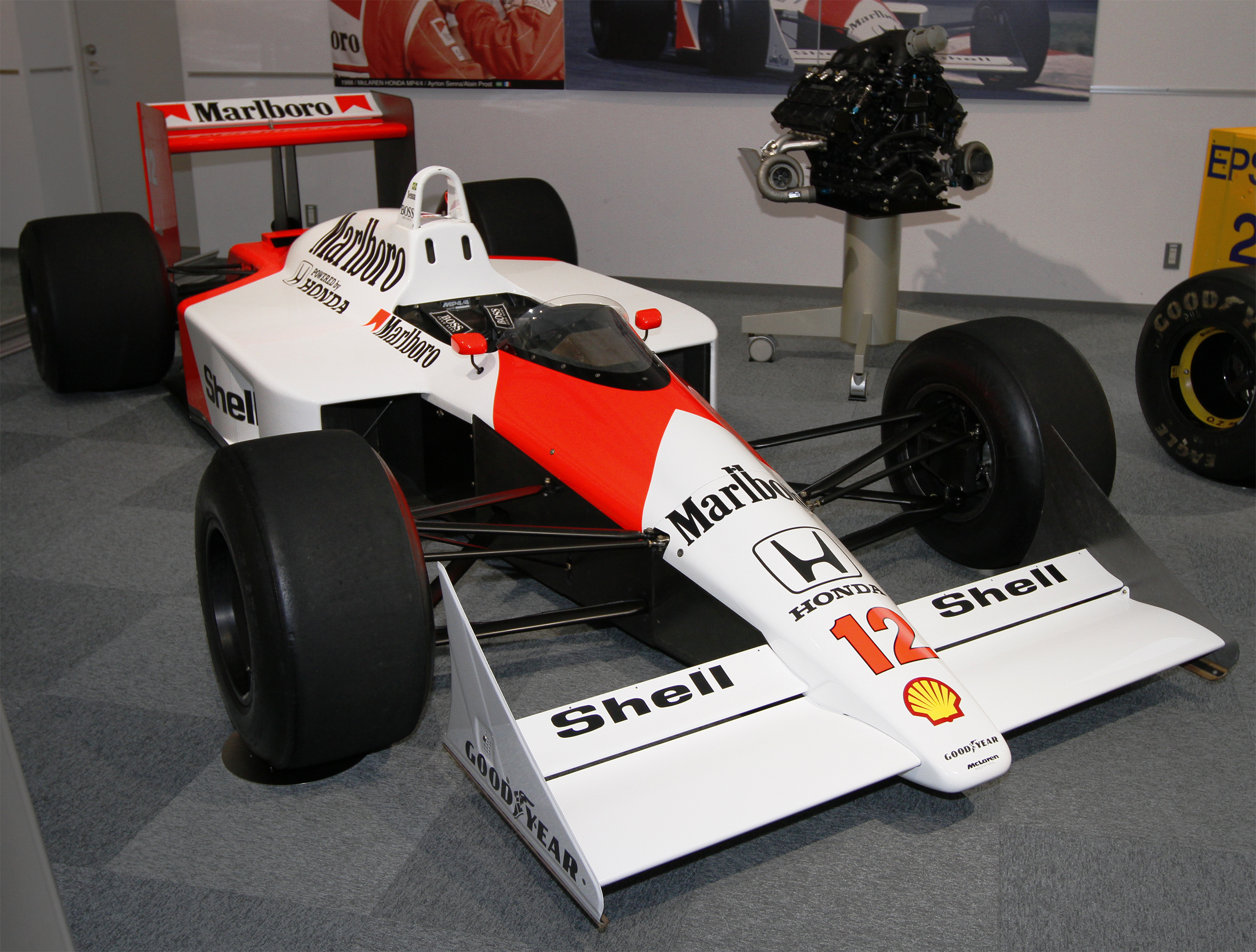
The 1988 McLaren-Honda MP4/4.

Honda's supreme year in its days as an engine supplier came with McLaren in 1988. Mated to the Steve Nichols and Gordon Murray designed McLaren MP4/4 and with then dual World Champion Alain Prost and Brazilian Ayrton Senna as the drivers, the McLaren-Honda duo had an almost perfect season. Unlike most, Honda built an all-new V6 turbo (the RA168E) for the year to cope with the reduced fuel limit (150 litres) and turbo boost limit (2.5 bar, down from 4.0 bar in 1987) and it paid massive dividends. McLaren-Honda claimed 15 pole positions in the 16 races, 13 of them for Senna, and also claimed 15 race wins, 8 from Senna (a new season record) and 7 from Prost which actually equaled the old record he jointly held with Jim Clark. McLaren-Honda scored a then-record 199 points in the Constructors' Championship, a massive 134 points ahead of second-placed Ferrari (whose driver Gerhard Berger was the only non-Honda-powered pole winner in Britain and the only non-Honda-powered winner in Italy), while Senna and Prost were the only drivers in contention for the Drivers' Championship ultimately won by Senna. Prost actually scored more points than Senna over the course of the season, largely thanks to 7-second-place finishes to go with his 7 wins, but under the rules of the time, only the best 11 scores counted to the championship which saw the title go to the Brazilian.

Fittingly in the last race of Formula One's original turbo era, the 1988 Australian Grand Prix, Honda-powered drivers closed out the podium with Prost defeating Senna with the Lotus of Nelson Piquet finishing an easy 3rd.

== Honda RA16 Formula One Engine World Championship results ==
- 2 World Drivers' Championships:
  - Nelson Piquet, Williams (1987)
  - Ayrton Senna, McLaren (1988)
- 3 World Constructors' Championships
  - Williams (1986, 1987)
  - McLaren (1988)
- 40 Grand Prix wins:
  - 13 – Nigel Mansell (1985–1987)
  - 10 – Ayrton Senna (1987–1988)
  - 7 – Nelson Piquet (1986–1987)
  - 7 – Alain Prost (1988)
  - 3 – Keke Rosberg (1984–1985)
- 34 Pole Positions:
  - 14 – Ayrton Senna (1987–1988)
  - 10 – Nigel Mansell (1986–1987)
  - 6 – Nelson Piquet (1986-1987)
  - 2 – Keke Rosberg (1985)
  - 2 – Alain Prost (1988)
- 83 Podium Finishes
  - 46 – Williams (1984–1987)
  - 25 – McLaren (1988)
  - 11 – Lotus (1987–1988)

== Applications ==
- Spirit 201
- Williams FW09
- Williams FW10
- Williams FW11
- Lotus 99T
- Lotus 100T
- McLaren MP4/4
