= 1987 French Grand Prix =

- Race 6 of 16 in the 1987 Formula One World Championship
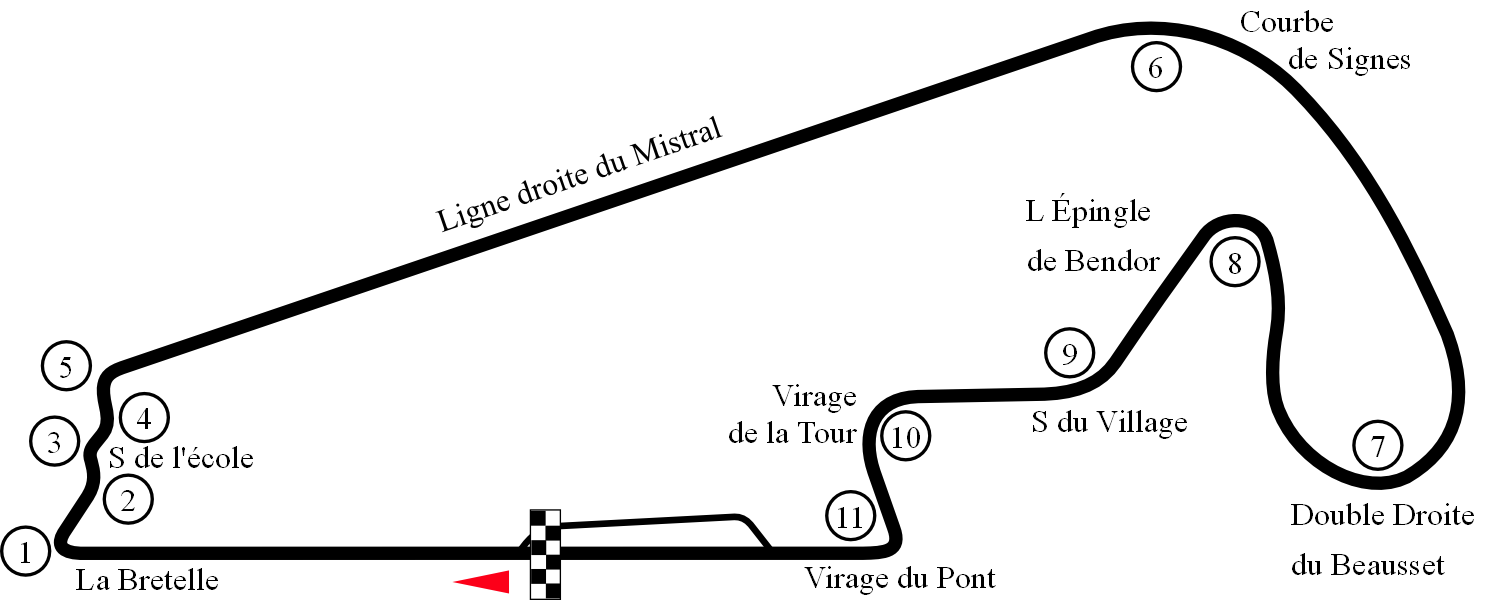

Race details
- Date: 5 July 1987
- Official name: Grand Prix de France
- Location: Circuit Paul Ricard, Le Castellet, France
- Course: Permanent racing facility
- Course length: 3.813 km (2.369 miles)
- Distance: 80 laps, 305.040 km (189.543 miles)
- Weather: Sunny and hot

Pole position
Driver	(United Kingdom) Nigel Mansell	Williams-Honda
- Time: 1:06.454

Fastest lap
Driver	(Brazil) Nelson Piquet	Williams-Honda
- Time: 1:09.548 on lap 68

Podium
First	(United Kingdom) Nigel Mansell	Williams-Honda
Second	(Brazil) Nelson Piquet	Williams-Honda
Third	(France) Alain Prost	McLaren-TAG

The 1987 French Grand Prix was a Formula One motor race held on 5 July 1987 at the Circuit Paul Ricard, Le Castellet. It was the sixth race of the 1987 Formula One World Championship. It was the 65th French Grand Prix and the eleventh to be held at Paul Ricard, and the second to be held on the shortened version of the circuit. The race was held over 80 laps of the 3.813-kilometre (2.369 mi) circuit for a race distance of 305.040 kilometres (189.543 mi).

The race was won by British driver Nigel Mansell, driving a Williams-Honda, after he started from pole position. Mansell took his second victory of the season by 7.7 seconds from Brazilian teammate Nelson Piquet, with local driver Alain Prost third in a McLaren-TAG.

Drivers' Championship leader, Brazilian Ayrton Senna, finished fourth in his Lotus-Honda, which was enough for him to retain the championship lead by one point over Prost, with Piquet and Mansell three and six points behind respectively.

== Race summary ==
=== Qualifying ===
For the first time since the 1986 Mexican Grand Prix, a non-Honda powered car was on the front row in the shape of the McLaren-TAG of Alain Prost, who qualified second. The pole position was taken once again by Nigel Mansell in his Williams-Honda, while the second row was occupied by Ayrton Senna's Lotus-Honda and Nelson Piquet's Williams. The fast nature of the circuit clearly suited the turbo cars: the best placed non-turbo driver was Ivan Capelli in the March 871 in 22nd place, about six seconds off the pace and 50 km/h (31 mph) slower on the Mistral Straight than the Williams-Hondas.

Showing the advances in engine development, aerodynamics and tyres, on his pole lap Mansell was timed at 325 km/h (202 mph) on the Mistral. Even though the Mistral used in 1987 was some 800 metres shorter than when Formula One last used the full circuit at Paul Ricard in 1985, the sheer acceleration and top speed of the Williams-Hondas was comparable to the top speeds seen at the circuit from the 1985 season cars.

During qualifying Arrows driver Derek Warwick gave a view on the strength of the turbocharged Honda RA167-E V6 engine and the acceleration advantage Williams had over the field since the opening round in Brazil. He noted that on one lap he entered the Mistral approximately 50 metres ahead of Piquet's Williams. Despite the known power of the Megatron (formerly BMW) turbo, Warwick claimed by the time they got to Signes just over one kilometre later the acceleration of the Honda had seen Piquet around 100 metres ahead of the Arrows A10.

=== Race ===
At the lights, Michele Alboreto jumped the start, whilst his Ferrari teammate Gerhard Berger stalled. Nigel Mansell led away and was joined by teammate Nelson Piquet at the front after he passed Prost on the Mistral Straight. Eddie Cheever retired his Arrows A10 on lap one after accidentally setting off the fire extinguisher whilst attempting to adjust the turbo boost. Andrea de Cesaris (Brabham BT56) then collided with Stefan Johansson, the McLaren requiring a pit stop for a damaged nosecone; the debris of his car caused some trouble to Mansell who ran into them.

Mansell, Piquet and Prost were engaged in a gripping battle for the lead, separated by just two seconds. On lap 19, Piquet spun and Prost passed him for second. Meanwhile, Senna was holding onto a creditable fourth place. On lap 30, Piquet pitted for new tyres, followed two laps later by Senna. Meanwhile, Thierry Boutsen (Benetton B187) retired with electrical failure. Both Mansell and Prost came in for new tyres on lap 36, handing the lead to Piquet. Mansell completed his stop and closed rapidly on Piquet, breaking fastest lap records. On lap 46, at the Le Beausset corner, Piquet made an error and Mansell passed him on the inside to take a lead he would not lose. On lap 65 Piquet made a second stop which went wrong when the engine stalled, delaying him by an additional eight seconds. After exiting the pits, he caught and passed Prost (who was dealing with an electrical problem) on lap 67.

Piquet was about 20 seconds behind Mansell, but on the final laps he was gaining at two seconds a lap. With seven laps to go, the gap was reduced to just 13 seconds, but Mansell paced himself to win by 7.7 seconds. Johansson had fought courageously up to sixth place after two pit stops to repair damages on his McLaren, but retired just five laps from the chequered flag.

In his home race, Prost took the final podium place some 48 seconds behind Piquet. Senna finished fourth ahead of Teo Fabi's Benetton B187 in fifth. Philippe Streiff drove a superb race to take his first World Championship point and the victory for the Jim Clark Trophy in his Tyrrell-Ford.

== Classification ==
=== Qualifying ===
Pos	No	Driver	Constructor	Q1	Q2	Gap
1	5	(United Kingdom) Nigel Mansell	Williams-Honda	1:06.454	1:06.705	
2	1	(France) Alain Prost	McLaren-TAG	1:06.877	1:07.843	+0.423
3	12	(Brazil) Ayrton Senna	Lotus-Honda	1:07.303	1:07.024	+0.570
4	6	(Brazil) Nelson Piquet	Williams-Honda	1:07.270	1:07.140	+0.686
5	20	(Belgium) Thierry Boutsen	Benetton-Ford	1:08.077	1:08.176	+1.623
6	28	(Austria) Gerhard Berger	Ferrari	1:08.198	1:08.335	+1.744
7	19	(Italy) Teo Fabi	Benetton-Ford	1:08.293	1:11.815	+1.839
8	27	(Italy) Michele Alboreto	Ferrari	1:08.390	1:08.916	+1.936
9	2	(Sweden) Stefan Johansson	McLaren-TAG	1:08.577	1:09.095	+2.123
10	17	(United Kingdom) Derek Warwick	Arrows-Megatron	1:09.256	1:08.800	+2.346
11	8	(Italy) Andrea de Cesaris	Brabham-BMW	1:09.499	1:08.949	+2.495
12	7	(Italy) Riccardo Patrese	Brabham-BMW	1:09.458	1:08.993	+2.539
13	25	(France) René Arnoux	Ligier-Megatron	1:09.430	1:09.970	+2.976
14	18	(United States) Eddie Cheever	Arrows-Megatron	1:09.828	1:09.869	+3.374
15	24	(Italy) Alessandro Nannini	Minardi-Motori Moderni	1:10.388	1:09.868	+3.414
16	11	(Japan) Satoru Nakajima	Lotus-Honda	1:12.268	1:10.652	+4.198
17	26	(Italy) Piercarlo Ghinzani	Ligier-Megatron	1:10.798	1:10.900	+4.344
18	9	(United Kingdom) Martin Brundle	Zakspeed	1:11.451	1:11.170	+4.716
19	10	(West Germany) Christian Danner	Zakspeed	1:11.456	1:11.389	+4.935
20	21	(Italy) Alex Caffi	Osella-Alfa Romeo	1:12.167	1:12.555	+5.713
21	23	(Spain) Adrián Campos	Minardi-Motori Moderni	1:13.145	1:12.551	+6.097
22	16	(Italy) Ivan Capelli	March-Ford	1:13.204	1:12.654	+6.200
23	30	(France) Philippe Alliot	Lola-Ford	1:13.026	1:14.422	+6.572
24	3	(United Kingdom) Jonathan Palmer	Tyrrell-Ford	1:13.443	1:13.474	+6.989
25	4	(France) Philippe Streiff	Tyrrell-Ford	1:13.553	1:13.525	+7.071
26	14	(France) Pascal Fabre	AGS-Ford	1:14.699	1:14.787	+8.245

=== Race ===
Numbers in brackets refer to positions of normally aspirated entrants competing for the Jim Clark Trophy.

Pos	No	Driver	Constructor	Laps	Time/Retired	Grid	Points
1	5	(United Kingdom) Nigel Mansell	Williams-Honda	80	1:37:03.839	1	9
2	6	(Brazil) Nelson Piquet	Williams-Honda	80	+ 7.711	4	6
3	1	(France) Alain Prost	McLaren-TAG	80	+ 55.255	2	4
4	12	(Brazil) Ayrton Senna	Lotus-Honda	79	+ 1 lap	3	3
5	19	(Italy) Teo Fabi	Benetton-Ford	77	+ 3 laps	7	2
6 (1)	4	(France) Philippe Streiff	Tyrrell-Ford	76	+ 4 laps	25	1
7 (2)	3	(United Kingdom) Jonathan Palmer	Tyrrell-Ford	76	+ 4 laps	24	
8	2	(Sweden) Stefan Johansson	McLaren-TAG	74	+ 6 laps	9	
9 (3)	14	(France) Pascal Fabre	AGS-Ford	74	+ 6 laps	26	
Ret	28	(Austria) Gerhard Berger	Ferrari	71	Suspension	6	
NC	11	(Japan) Satoru Nakajima	Lotus-Honda	71	+ 9 laps	16	
Ret	27	(Italy) Michele Alboreto	Ferrari	64	Engine	8	
Ret	17	(United Kingdom) Derek Warwick	Arrows-Megatron	62	Turbo	10	
Ret	30	(France) Philippe Alliot	Lola-Ford	57	Gearbox	23	
Ret	16	(Italy) Ivan Capelli	March-Ford	52	Engine	22	
Ret	23	(Spain) Adrián Campos	Minardi-Motori Moderni	52	Turbo	21	
Ret	25	(France) René Arnoux	Ligier-Megatron	33	Exhaust	13	
Ret	20	(Belgium) Thierry Boutsen	Benetton-Ford	31	Engine	5	
Ret	10	(West Germany) Christian Danner	Zakspeed	26	Overheating	19	
Ret	26	(Italy) Piercarlo Ghinzani	Ligier-Megatron	24	Engine	17	
Ret	24	(Italy) Alessandro Nannini	Minardi-Motori Moderni	23	Turbo	15	
Ret	7	(Italy) Riccardo Patrese	Brabham-BMW	19	Differential	12	
Ret	9	(United Kingdom) Martin Brundle	Zakspeed	18	Wheel	18	
Ret	21	(Italy) Alex Caffi	Osella-Alfa Romeo	11	Engine	20	
Ret	8	(Italy) Andrea de Cesaris	Brabham-BMW	2	Turbo	11	
Ret	18	(United States) Eddie Cheever	Arrows-Megatron	0	Electrical	14	

== Championship standings after the race ==
Drivers' Championship standings

Pos	Driver	Points
1	(Brazil) Ayrton Senna	27
2	(France) Alain Prost	26
3	(Brazil) Nelson Piquet	24
4	(United Kingdom) Nigel Mansell	21
5	(Sweden) Stefan Johansson	13

Constructors' Championship standings

Pos	Constructor	Points
1	(United Kingdom) Williams-Honda	45
2	(United Kingdom) McLaren-TAG	39
3	(United Kingdom) Lotus-Honda	30
4	(Italy) Ferrari	17
5	(United Kingdom) Brabham-BMW	4

Jim Clark Trophy standings

Pos	Driver	Points
1	(United Kingdom) Jonathan Palmer	33
2	(France) Philippe Streiff	30
3	(France) Pascal Fabre	26
4	(France) Philippe Alliot	15
5	(Italy) Ivan Capelli	6

Colin Chapman Trophy standings

Pos	Constructor	Points
1	(United Kingdom) Tyrrell-Ford	63
2	(France) AGS-Ford	26
3	(France) Lola-Ford	15
4	(United Kingdom) March-Ford	6

- Note: Only the top five positions are included for all four sets of standings.

Previous race: 1987 Detroit Grand Prix	FIA Formula One World Championship; 1987 season	Next race: 1987 British Grand Prix
Previous race: 1986 French Grand Prix	French Grand Prix	Next race: 1988 French Grand Prix
