= 1987 German Grand Prix =

- Race 8 of 16 in the 1987 Formula One World Championship

Race details
- Date: 26 July 1987
- Official name: Mobil Grosser Preis von Deutschland
- Location: Hockenheimring, Hockenheim, West Germany
- Course: Permanent racing facility
- Course length: 6.802 km (4.227 miles)
- Distance: 44 laps, 299.068 km (185.832 miles)

Pole position
| Driver | (United Kingdom) Nigel Mansell | Williams-Honda |
- Time: 1:42.616

Fastest lap
| Driver | (United Kingdom) Nigel Mansell | Williams-Honda |
- Time: 1:45.716 on lap 24

Podium
| First | (Brazil) Nelson Piquet | Williams-Honda |
| Second | (Sweden) Stefan Johansson | McLaren-TAG |
| Third | (Brazil) Ayrton Senna | Lotus-Honda |

The 1987 German Grand Prix was a Formula One motor race held at the Hockenheimring on 26 July 1987. It was the eighth round of the 1987 Formula One season. It was the 49th German Grand Prix and the eleventh to be held at the Hockenheimring. It was held over 44 laps of the seven kilometre circuit for a race distance of 298.760 km (185.812 mi).

== Pre-race ==
In the week leading up to the German Grand Prix a number of teams tested at the Hockenheim circuit. During testing Ayrton Senna had a very lucky escape when he had a rear tyre failure at over 300 km/h (186 mph) on the long straight leading to the Bremsschikane. The rear corner of his Lotus 99T was destroyed and parts were reported to be hard to find as most ended up flying off into the forest. As a result of the crash Goodyear took the precaution of immediately flying in new compound tyres from their plant in Akron in the United States in time for the Grand Prix weekend.

The tyre failure was determined to be the result of Senna picking up a puncture late on his previous lap. However the Lotus' active suspension system compensated for that and kept the car at its correct ride height, masking the problem from Senna. This caused many to question the system as the general belief was that with a passively suspended car Senna would have known he had a puncture and would not have continued to drive at high speed.

== Race ==
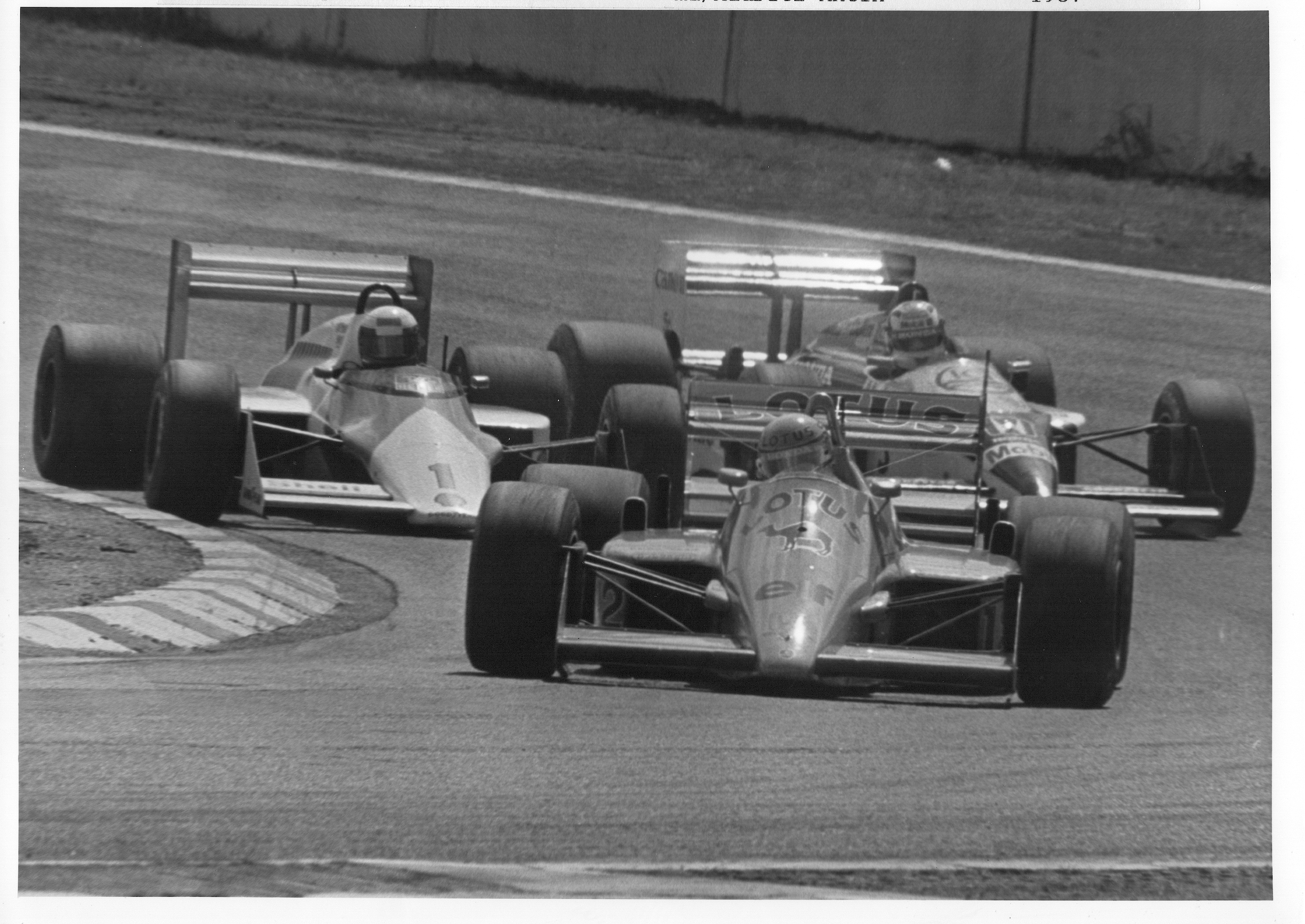
Ayrton Senna of Brazil in his Lotus car leads the pack after the start of the West German F1 Grand Prix in Hockenheim on July 26, 1987. Senna is followed by Alain Prost of France (left) and Britain's Nigel Mansell.

The race was won by eventual 1987 World Champion, Nelson Piquet driving a Williams FW11B. It was his first win of the season and his third win in the German Grand Prix having previously won for Brabham in 1981, and Williams in the previous year. Piquet won by over a minute and a half from Swedish driver Stefan Johansson driving a McLaren MP4/3, who coasted over the finish line on three wheels due to a tyre puncture suffered just past the pits on his last lap. The Swede's second place was the 50th podium finish for the Porsche-designed TAG turbo engine. Piquet inherited the win after engine failure claimed his team-mate, Briton Nigel Mansell, and reigning champion, Frenchman Alain Prost (McLaren MP4/3). Ayrton Senna finished third in his Lotus 99T.

Just seven cars were classified at the end of the race, as the long straights took their toll on engine reliability. Naturally aspirated cars finished as high as fourth place with Frenchman Philippe Streiff leading home a team one-two in the Jim Clark/Colin Chapman Trophy standings for Tyrrell as Jonathan Palmer finished in fifth place. In sixth was French driver Philippe Alliot driving a Lola LC87 for the new Larrousse team. It was Alliot's second top six finish in Formula One and Larrousse's first world championship point, although the Constructor's Championship point would be credited to the chassis designers, Lola Cars.

Piquet's win vaulted him into the championship lead for the first time in 1987, putting him four points ahead of Senna and nine ahead of Mansell.

== Classification ==
=== Qualifying ===
| Pos | No | Driver | Constructor | Q1 | Q2 | Gap |
|---|---|---|---|---|---|---|
| 1 | 5 | (United Kingdom) Nigel Mansell | Williams-Honda | 1:42.616 | 2:00.832 | — |
| 2 | 12 | (Brazil) Ayrton Senna | Lotus-Honda | 1:42.873 | 1:01:19.245 | +0.257 |
| 3 | 1 | (France) Alain Prost | McLaren-TAG | 1:43.202 | no time | +0.586 |
| 4 | 6 | (Brazil) Nelson Piquet | Williams-Honda | 1:43.705 | no time | +1.089 |
| 5 | 27 | (Italy) Michele Alboreto | Ferrari | 1:43.921 | 2:05.139 | +1.305 |
| 6 | 20 | (Belgium) Thierry Boutsen | Benetton-Ford | 1:45.066 | 2:02.981 | +2.450 |
| 7 | 8 | (Italy) Andrea de Cesaris | Brabham-BMW | 1:45.411 | no time | +2.795 |
| 8 | 2 | (Sweden) Stefan Johansson | McLaren-TAG | 1:45.428 | no time | +2.812 |
| 9 | 19 | (Italy) Teo Fabi | Benetton-Ford | 1:45.497 | 2:06.857 | +2.881 |
| 10 | 28 | (Austria) Gerhard Berger | Ferrari | 1:45.902 | 2:03.172 | +3.286 |
| 11 | 7 | (Italy) Riccardo Patrese | Brabham-BMW | 1:46.096 | no time | +3.480 |
| 12 | 25 | (France) René Arnoux | Ligier-Megatron | 1:46.323 | no time | +3.707 |
| 13 | 17 | (United Kingdom) Derek Warwick | Arrows-Megatron | 1:46.525 | no time | +3.909 |
| 14 | 11 | (Japan) Satoru Nakajima | Lotus-Honda | 1:46.760 | no time | +4.144 |
| 15 | 18 | (United States) Eddie Cheever | Arrows-Megatron | 1:47.780 | 2:04.003 | +5.164 |
| 16 | 24 | (Italy) Alessandro Nannini | Minardi-Motori Moderni | 1:47.887 | no time | +5.271 |
| 17 | 26 | (Italy) Piercarlo Ghinzani | Ligier-Megatron | 1:49.236 | 2:09.440 | +6.620 |
| 18 | 23 | (Spain) Adrián Campos | Minardi-Motori Moderni | 1:49.668 | no time | +7.052 |
| 19 | 9 | (United Kingdom) Martin Brundle | Zakspeed | 1:51.062 | 2:12.913 | +8.446 |
| 20 | 10 | (West Germany) Christian Danner | Zakspeed | 1:51.448 | 2:11.115 | +8.832 |
| 21 | 30 | (France) Philippe Alliot | Lola-Ford | 1:52.760 | 2:11.588 | +10.144 |
| 22 | 4 | (France) Philippe Streiff | Tyrrell-Ford | 1:53.528 | 2:10.404 | +10.912 |
| 23 | 3 | (United Kingdom) Jonathan Palmer | Tyrrell-Ford | 1:54.491 | 2:06.769 | +11.875 |
| 24 | 16 | (Italy) Ivan Capelli | March-Ford | 1:54.616 | 2:09.992 | +12.000 |
| 25 | 14 | (France) Pascal Fabre | AGS-Ford | 1:54.997 | no time | +12.381 |
| 26 | 21 | (Italy) Alex Caffi | Osella-Alfa Romeo | 6:04.561 | 2:07.753 | +25.137 |

=== Race ===
| Pos | No | Driver | Constructor | Laps | Time/Retired | Grid | Points |
|---|---|---|---|---|---|---|---|
| 1 | 6 | (Brazil) Nelson Piquet | Williams-Honda | 44 | 1:21:25.091 | 4 | 9 |
| 2 | 2 | (Sweden) Stefan Johansson | McLaren-TAG | 44 | + 1:39.591 | 8 | 6 |
| 3 | 12 | (Brazil) Ayrton Senna | Lotus-Honda | 43 | + 1 Lap | 2 | 4 |
| 4 (1) | 4 | (France) Philippe Streiff | Tyrrell-Ford | 43 | + 1 Lap | 22 | 3 |
| 5 (2) | 3 | (United Kingdom) Jonathan Palmer | Tyrrell-Ford | 43 | + 1 Lap | 23 | 2 |
| 6 (3) | 30 | (France) Philippe Alliot | Lola-Ford | 42 | + 2 Laps | 21 | 1 |
| 7 | 1 | (France) Alain Prost | McLaren-TAG | 39 | Electrical | 3 | |
| NC | 9 | (United Kingdom) Martin Brundle | Zakspeed | 34 | + 10 Laps | 19 | |
| Ret | 26 | (Italy) Piercarlo Ghinzani | Ligier-Megatron | 32 | Engine | 17 | |
| Ret | 23 | (Spain) Adrián Campos | Minardi-Motori Moderni | 28 | Engine | 18 | |
| Ret | 20 | (Belgium) Thierry Boutsen | Benetton-Ford | 26 | Engine | 6 | |
| Ret | 5 | (United Kingdom) Nigel Mansell | Williams-Honda | 25 | Engine | 1 | |
| Ret | 24 | (Italy) Alessandro Nannini | Minardi-Motori Moderni | 25 | Engine | 16 | |
| Ret | 17 | (United Kingdom) Derek Warwick | Arrows-Megatron | 23 | Turbo | 13 | |
| Ret | 10 | (West Germany) Christian Danner | Zakspeed | 21 | Halfshaft | 20 | |
| Ret | 28 | (Austria) Gerhard Berger | Ferrari | 19 | Turbo | 10 | |
| Ret | 19 | (Italy) Teo Fabi | Benetton-Ford | 18 | Engine | 9 | |
| Ret | 21 | (Italy) Alex Caffi | Osella-Alfa Romeo | 17 | Engine | 26 | |
| Ret | 8 | (Italy) Andrea de Cesaris | Brabham-BMW | 12 | Engine | 7 | |
| Ret | 27 | (Italy) Michele Alboreto | Ferrari | 10 | Turbo | 5 | |
| Ret | 14 | (France) Pascal Fabre | AGS-Ford | 10 | Engine | 25 | |
| Ret | 18 | (United States) Eddie Cheever | Arrows-Megatron | 9 | Throttle | 15 | |
| Ret | 11 | (Japan) Satoru Nakajima | Lotus-Honda | 9 | Turbo | 14 | |
| Ret | 16 | (Italy) Ivan Capelli | March-Ford | 7 | Engine | 24 | |
| Ret | 25 | (France) René Arnoux | Ligier-Megatron | 6 | Ignition | 12 | |
| Ret | 7 | (Italy) Riccardo Patrese | Brabham-BMW | 5 | Ignition | 11 | |

- Numbers in brackets refer to positions of normally aspirated entrants competing for the Jim Clark Trophy.

== Championship standings after the race ==
Drivers' Championship standings

| Pos | Driver | Points |
|---|---|---|
| 1 | (Brazil) Nelson Piquet | 39 |
| 2 | (Brazil) Ayrton Senna | 35 |
| 3 | (United Kingdom) Nigel Mansell | 30 |
| 4 | (France) Alain Prost | 26 |
| 5 | (Sweden) Stefan Johansson | 19 |

Constructors' Championship standings

| Pos | Constructor | Points |
|---|---|---|
| 1 | (United Kingdom) Williams-Honda | 69 |
| 2 | (United Kingdom) McLaren-TAG | 45 |
| 3 | (United Kingdom) Lotus-Honda | 41 |
| 4 | (Italy) Ferrari | 17 |
| 5 | (United Kingdom) Tyrrell-Ford | 8 |

Jim Clark Trophy standings

| Pos | Driver | Points |
|---|---|---|
| 1 | (United Kingdom) Jonathan Palmer | 48 |
| 2 | (France) Philippe Streiff | 39 |
| 3 | (France) Pascal Fabre | 34 |
| 4 | (France) Philippe Alliot | 19 |
| 5 | (Italy) Ivan Capelli | 6 |

Colin Chapman Trophy standings

| Pos | Constructor | Points |
|---|---|---|
| 1 | (United Kingdom) Tyrrell-Ford | 87 |
| 2 | (France) AGS-Ford | 32 |
| 3 | (France) Lola-Ford | 19 |
| 4 | (United Kingdom) March-Ford | 6 |

- Note: Only the top five positions are included for all four sets of standings.

| Previous race: 1987 British Grand Prix | FIA Formula One World Championship; 1987 season | Next race: 1987 Hungarian Grand Prix |
| Previous race: 1986 German Grand Prix | German Grand Prix | Next race: 1988 German Grand Prix |
