= 1987 Hungarian Grand Prix =

- Race 9 of 16 in the 1987 Formula One World Championship

Race details
- Date: 9 August 1987
- Location: Hungaroring, Mogyoród, Hungary
- Course: Permanent racing facility
- Course length: 4.014 km (2.495 miles)
- Distance: 76 laps, 305.064 km (189.620 miles)
- Weather: Dry

Pole position
Driver	(United Kingdom) Nigel Mansell	Williams-Honda
- Time: 1:28.047

Fastest lap
Driver	(Brazil) Nelson Piquet	Williams-Honda
- Time: 1:30.149 on lap 65 (lap record)

Podium
First	(Brazil) Nelson Piquet	Williams-Honda
Second	(Brazil) Ayrton Senna	Lotus-Honda
Third	(France) Alain Prost	McLaren-TAG

The 1987 Hungarian Grand Prix was a Formula One motor race held at the Hungaroring on 9 August 1987. It was the ninth race of the 1987 Formula One World Championship. The race was held over 76 laps of the 4-kilometre (2.5 mi) circuit for a race distance of 305 kilometres (190 mi).

The race was won by Brazilian driver Nelson Piquet, driving a Williams-Honda. His teammate, Briton Nigel Mansell, took pole position and led until he lost a wheel nut with six laps remaining. Piquet's compatriot Ayrton Senna finished second in a Lotus-Honda, with Frenchman Alain Prost third in a McLaren-TAG.

The win, Piquet's second in succession, extended his lead over Senna in the Drivers' Championship to seven points, with Mansell and Prost a further eleven points back.

== Race summary ==
Before the race, Ayrton Senna informed Lotus that he would be leaving the team at the end of the year. Almost immediately, Lotus signed Senna's fellow Brazilian and Drivers' Championship leader, Nelson Piquet, who explained that he felt that Williams had not honoured his number one driver status in the team.

Piquet went on to take his second consecutive win in his Williams-Honda. Senna finished second in his Lotus-Honda but 37 seconds behind Piquet, while Alain Prost took third in his McLaren-TAG.

Thierry Boutsen finished fourth in his Benetton-Ford, ahead of the Brabham-BMW of Riccardo Patrese. The final championship point was claimed by Derek Warwick in his Arrows-Megatron, who was battling with influenza and conjunctivitis. Jonathan Palmer claimed the Jim Clark Trophy points finishing seventh in his Tyrrell DG016 with teammate Philippe Streiff finishing ninth behind the second Arrows of Eddie Cheever. Italian driver Ivan Capelli was tenth in the March 871.

The win allowed Piquet to expand his championship points lead to seven over Senna and 18 over Mansell.

== Classification ==
=== Qualifying ===
Pos	No	Driver	Constructor	Q1	Q2	Gap
1	5	(United Kingdom) Nigel Mansell	Williams-Honda	1:28.047	1:28.682	
2	28	(Austria) Gerhard Berger	Ferrari	1:31.080	1:28.549	+0.502
3	6	(Brazil) Nelson Piquet	Williams-Honda	1:30.842	1:29.724	+1.677
4	1	(France) Alain Prost	McLaren-TAG	1:30.156	1:30.327	+2.109
5	27	(Italy) Michele Alboreto	Ferrari	1:30.472	1:30.310	+2.263
6	12	(Brazil) Ayrton Senna	Lotus-Honda	1:31.387	1:30.387	+2.340
7	20	(Belgium) Thierry Boutsen	Benetton-Ford	1:30.748	1:30.810	+2.701
8	2	(Sweden) Stefan Johansson	McLaren-TAG	1:31.228	1:31.940	+3.181
9	17	(United Kingdom) Derek Warwick	Arrows-Megatron	1:31.416	1:34.386	+3.369
10	7	(Italy) Riccardo Patrese	Brabham-BMW	1:31.586	1:32.422	+3.539
11	18	(United States) Eddie Cheever	Arrows-Megatron	1:32.336	1:33.700	+4.289
12	19	(Italy) Teo Fabi	Benetton-Ford	1:32.452	1:32.639	+4.405
13	8	(Italy) Andrea de Cesaris	Brabham-BMW	1:32.628	1:43.913	+4.581
14	4	(France) Philippe Streiff	Tyrrell-Ford	1:33.644	1:34.383	+5.597
15	30	(France) Philippe Alliot	Lola-Ford	1:33.777	1:34.014	+5.730
16	3	(United Kingdom) Jonathan Palmer	Tyrrell-Ford	1:34.398	1:33.895	+5.848
17	11	(Japan) Satoru Nakajima	Lotus-Honda	1:34.297	1:34.476	+6.250
18	16	(Italy) Ivan Capelli	March-Ford	1:34.950	1:34.426	+6.379
19	25	(France) René Arnoux	Ligier-Megatron	1:35.346	1:34.518	+6.471
20	24	(Italy) Alessandro Nannini	Minardi-Motori Moderni	1:34.796	1:34.770	+6.723
21	21	(Italy) Alex Caffi	Osella-Alfa Romeo	1:36.693	1:35.594	+7.547
22	9	(United Kingdom) Martin Brundle	Zakspeed	1:35.754	1:35.818	+7.707
23	10	(West Germany) Christian Danner	Zakspeed	1:35.930	1:36.371	+7.883
24	23	(Spain) Adrián Campos	Minardi-Motori Moderni	1:36.067	1:37.948	+8.020
25	26	(Italy) Piercarlo Ghinzani	Ligier-Megatron	1:36.411	1:36.109	+8.062
26	14	(France) Pascal Fabre	AGS-Ford	1:38.803	1:37.730	+9.683

=== Race ===
Numbers in brackets refer to positions of normally aspirated entrants competing for the Jim Clark Trophy.

Pos	No	Driver	Constructor	Laps	Time/Retired	Grid	Points
1	6	(Brazil) Nelson Piquet	Williams-Honda	76	1:59:26.793	3	9
2	12	(Brazil) Ayrton Senna	Lotus-Honda	76	+ 37.727	6	6
3	1	(France) Alain Prost	McLaren-TAG	76	+ 1:27.456	4	4
4	20	(Belgium) Thierry Boutsen	Benetton-Ford	75	+ 1 lap	7	3
5	7	(Italy) Riccardo Patrese	Brabham-BMW	75	+ 1 lap	10	2
6	17	(United Kingdom) Derek Warwick	Arrows-Megatron	74	+ 2 laps	9	1
7 (1)	3	(United Kingdom) Jonathan Palmer	Tyrrell-Ford	74	+ 2 laps	16	
8	18	(United States) Eddie Cheever	Arrows-Megatron	74	+ 2 laps	11	
9 (2)	4	(France) Philippe Streiff	Tyrrell-Ford	74	+ 2 laps	14	
10 (3)	16	(Italy) Ivan Capelli	March-Ford	74	+ 2 laps	18	
11	24	(Italy) Alessandro Nannini	Minardi-Motori Moderni	73	+ 3 laps	20	
12	26	(Italy) Piercarlo Ghinzani	Ligier-Megatron	73	+ 3 laps	25	
13 (4)	14	(France) Pascal Fabre	AGS-Ford	71	+ 5 laps	26	
14	5	(United Kingdom) Nigel Mansell	Williams-Honda	70	Wheel	1	
Ret	21	(Italy) Alex Caffi	Osella-Alfa Romeo	64	Fuel system	21	
Ret	25	(France) René Arnoux	Ligier-Megatron	57	Electrical	19	
Ret	30	(France) Philippe Alliot	Lola-Ford	48	Accident	15	
Ret	9	(United Kingdom) Martin Brundle	Zakspeed	45	Turbo	22	
Ret	27	(Italy) Michele Alboreto	Ferrari	43	Engine	5	
Ret	8	(Italy) Andrea de Cesaris	Brabham-BMW	43	Gearbox	13	
Ret	2	(Sweden) Stefan Johansson	McLaren-TAG	14	Gearbox	8	
Ret	19	(Italy) Teo Fabi	Benetton-Ford	14	Gearbox	12	
Ret	23	(Spain) Adrián Campos	Minardi-Motori Moderni	14	Spun off	24	
Ret	28	(Austria) Gerhard Berger	Ferrari	13	Differential	2	
Ret	10	(West Germany) Christian Danner	Zakspeed	3	Engine	23	
Ret	11	(Japan) Satoru Nakajima	Lotus-Honda	1	Driveshaft	17	

== Championship standings after the race ==
Drivers' Championship standings

Pos	Driver	Points
1	(Brazil) Nelson Piquet	48
2	(Brazil) Ayrton Senna	41
3	(United Kingdom) Nigel Mansell	30
4	(France) Alain Prost	30
5	(Sweden) Stefan Johansson	19

Constructors' Championship standings

Pos	Constructor	Points
1	(United Kingdom) Williams-Honda	78
2	(United Kingdom) McLaren-TAG	49
3	(United Kingdom) Lotus-Honda	47
4	(Italy) Ferrari	17
5	(United Kingdom) Tyrrell-Ford	8

Jim Clark Trophy standings

Pos	Driver	Points
1	(United Kingdom) Jonathan Palmer	57
2	(France) Philippe Streiff	45
3	(France) Pascal Fabre	35
4	(France) Philippe Alliot	19
5	(Italy) Ivan Capelli	10

Colin Chapman Trophy standings

Pos	Constructor	Points
1	(United Kingdom) Tyrrell-Ford	102
2	(France) AGS-Ford	35
3	(France) Lola-Ford	19
4	(United Kingdom) March-Ford	10

- Note: Only the top five positions are included for all four sets of standings.

Previous race: 1987 German Grand Prix	FIA Formula One World Championship; 1987 season	Next race: 1987 Austrian Grand Prix
Previous race: 1986 Hungarian Grand Prix	Hungarian Grand Prix	Next race: 1988 Hungarian Grand Prix
