= 1987 British Grand Prix =

- Race 7 of 16 in the 1987 Formula One World Championship
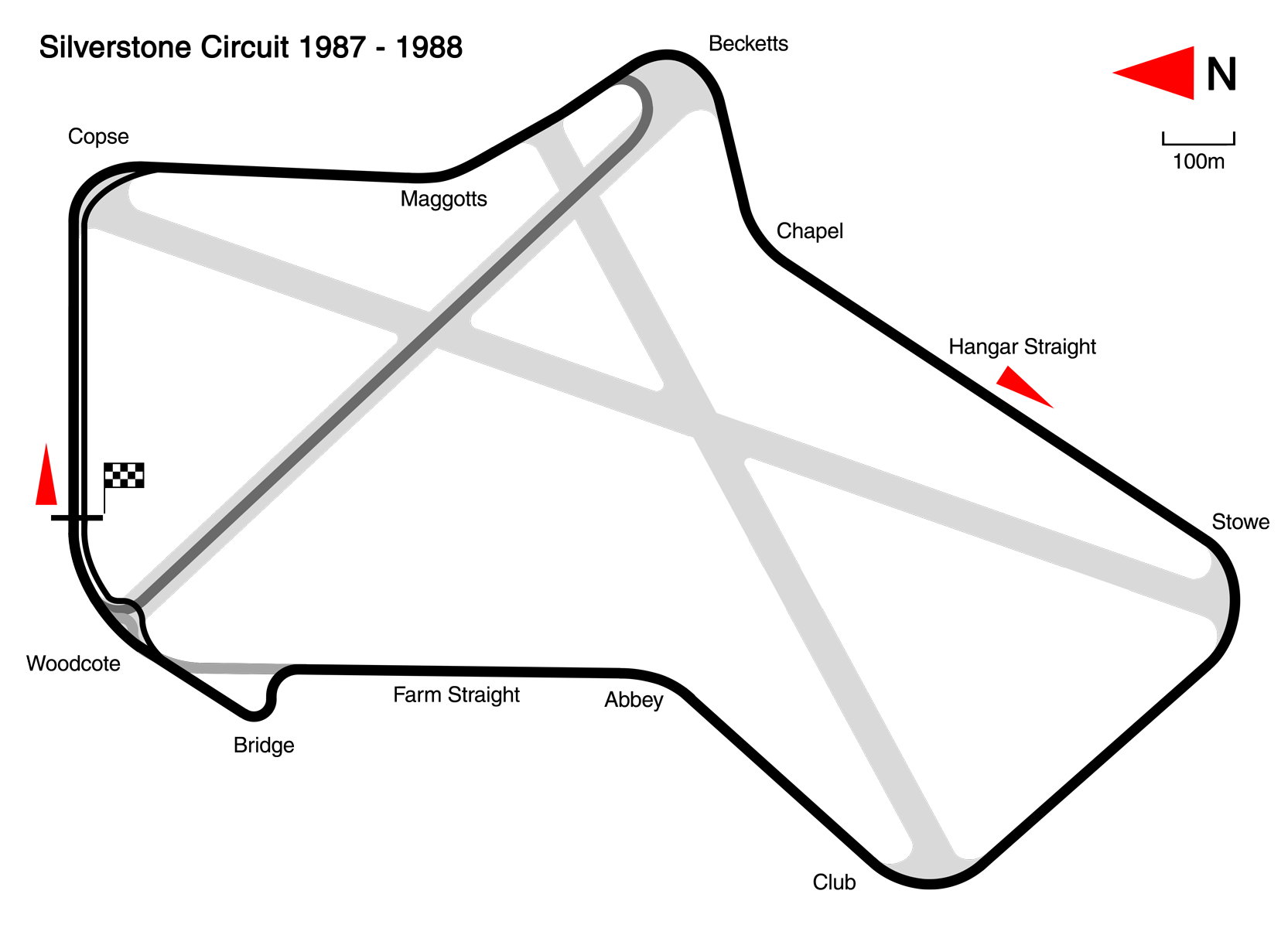

Race details
- Date: 12 July 1987
- Official name: XL Shell Oils British Grand Prix
- Location: Silverstone Circuit; Silverstone, Northamptonshire, England
- Course: Permanent racing facility
- Course length: 4.778 km (2.969 miles)
- Distance: 65 laps, 310.570 km (192.979 miles)
- Weather: Sunny and warm

Pole position
Driver	(Brazil) Nelson Piquet	Williams-Honda
- Time: 1:07.110

Fastest lap
Driver	(United Kingdom) Nigel Mansell	Williams-Honda
- Time: 1:09.832 on lap 58

Podium
First	(United Kingdom) Nigel Mansell	Williams-Honda
Second	(Brazil) Nelson Piquet	Williams-Honda
Third	(Brazil) Ayrton Senna	Lotus-Honda

The 1987 British Grand Prix (formally the XL Shell Oils British Grand Prix) was a Formula One motor race held on 12 July 1987 at the Silverstone Circuit, Silverstone. It was the seventh race of the 1987 Formula One World Championship. It was the 42nd British Grand Prix and the 23rd to be held at Silverstone. The race was held over 65 laps of the 4.78-kilometre (2.97 mi) circuit for race distance of 311 kilometres (193 mi).

The race was won by local driver Nigel Mansell, driving a Williams-Honda. In one of his most memorable Formula One performances, Mansell hunted down Brazilian team-mate Nelson Piquet, who had started from pole position, with three laps remaining. It was Mansell's third win of the season, and his second consecutive British Grand Prix victory. Ayrton Senna finished third in his Lotus-Honda, one lap behind.

The win moved Mansell into second place in the Drivers' Championship, level on points with Piquet and one point behind Senna.

== Qualifying report ==
As usual, Honda-powered cars dominated the qualifying sessions, with Nelson Piquet taking pole position and Ayrton Senna third in his Lotus despite being a full second slower than Mansell. Alain Prost was fourth in his McLaren, while the Benettons of Thierry Boutsen and Teo Fabi were fifth and sixth, and the Ferraris of Michele Alboreto and Gerhard Berger seventh and eighth. Completing the top ten were Andrea de Cesaris in the Brabham and Stefan Johansson in the second McLaren.

During qualifying, Piercarlo Ghinzani's Ligier ran out of fuel in front of the pits. His mechanics jumped the pit wall, refuelled him on the track and then push-started him, a clear violation of the rules leading to Ghinzani's exclusion from the remainder of the event. Before the incident, the Italian had set a time which would have put him 19th on the grid.

=== Qualifying classification ===
Pos	No	Driver	Constructor	Q1	Q2	Gap
1	6	(Brazil) Nelson Piquet	Williams-Honda	1:07.596	1:07.110	—
2	5	(United Kingdom) Nigel Mansell	Williams-Honda	1:07.725	1:07.180	+0.070
3	12	(Brazil) Ayrton Senna	Lotus-Honda	1:09.255	1:08.181	+1.071
4	1	(France) Alain Prost	McLaren-TAG	1:08.577	1:09.492	+1.467
5	20	(Belgium) Thierry Boutsen	Benetton-Ford	1:09.724	1:08.972	+1.862
6	19	(Italy) Teo Fabi	Benetton-Ford	1:10.264	1:09.246	+2.136
7	27	(Italy) Michele Alboreto	Ferrari	1:10.441	1:09.274	+2.164
8	28	(Austria) Gerhard Berger	Ferrari	1:10.328	1:09.408	+2.298
9	8	(Italy) Andrea de Cesaris	Brabham-BMW	1:10.787	1:09.475	+2.365
10	2	(Sweden) Stefan Johansson	McLaren-TAG	1:10.242	1:09.541	+2.431
11	7	(Italy) Riccardo Patrese	Brabham-BMW	1:10.012	1:10.020	+2.902
12	11	(Japan) Satoru Nakajima	Lotus-Honda	1:10.619	1:10.998	+3.509
13	17	(United Kingdom) Derek Warwick	Arrows-Megatron	1:10.654	1:10.781	+3.544
14	18	(United States) Eddie Cheever	Arrows-Megatron	1:11.053	1:11.310	+3.943
15	24	(Italy) Alessandro Nannini	Minardi-Motori Moderni	1:13.737	1:12.293	+5.183
16	25	(France) René Arnoux	Ligier-Megatron	1:12.503	1:12.402	+5.292
17	9	(United Kingdom) Martin Brundle	Zakspeed	1:12.852	1:12.632	+5.522
18	10	(West Germany) Christian Danner	Zakspeed	1:15.833	1:13.337	+6.227
19	23	(Spain) Adrián Campos	Minardi-Motori Moderni	1:15.719	1:13.793	+6.683
20	21	(Italy) Alex Caffi	Osella-Alfa Romeo	1:18.495	1:15.558	+8.448
21	30	(France) Philippe Alliot	Lola-Ford	1:16.770	1:15.868	+8.758
22	4	(France) Philippe Streiff	Tyrrell-Ford	1:17.208	1:16.524	+9.414
23	3	(United Kingdom) Jonathan Palmer	Tyrrell-Ford	1:16.644	1:17.105	+9.534
24	16	(Italy) Ivan Capelli	March-Ford	1:17.122	1:16.692	+9.582
25	14	(France) Pascal Fabre	AGS-Ford	1:19.163	1:18.237	+11.127
EX	26	(Italy) Piercarlo Ghinzani	Ligier-Megatron	1:13.381	no time	+6.271

== Race report ==
At the start, Prost was the quickest and took the lead, only to be passed by Piquet at Maggotts; Mansell soon followed his teammate. The race then developed into a battle between the two Williams drivers, with Piquet leading.

On lap 35, Mansell was around two seconds behind his teammate. Both Williams drivers were scheduled to complete the race without a tyre change, but Mansell and the team elected to make a stop to change tyres. Mansell rejoined the race some 29 seconds behind Piquet, with 28 laps remaining. On fresh rubber, Mansell began an epic charge, breaking the lap record eight times to the delight of the over 100,000 strong British crowd.

By lap 62 Mansell was right on Piquet's tail, and on lap 63 the Englishman overtook his teammate. Shortly after crossing the finish line, Mansell's car slowed down and was engulfed by the crowd. Initially it was thought that he had run out of fuel, but he had actually blown up the engine, out of the stress of running the last 6 laps on "Q" mode (which gives the engine +100 hp), and risking running out of fuel at any moment (his fuel display was reading "minus 2.5 laps"). In fact that incident was the last straw for the patience of the Honda management, since it had – again – threatened their easily attainable 1-2 result. Honda would switch their supply of engines from Williams to McLaren for 1988, while Piquet would sign for Lotus – also running Hondas – in the following weeks. Senna finished third, one lap down, with a further lap back to teammate Satoru Nakajima in fourth. Derek Warwick was fifth in the Arrows-Megatron, with Fabi completing the top six.

=== Race classification ===
Numbers in brackets refer to positions of normally aspirated entrants competing for the Jim Clark Trophy.

Pos	No	Driver	Constructor	Laps	Time/Retired	Grid	Points
1	5	(United Kingdom) Nigel Mansell	Williams-Honda	65	1:19:11.780	2	9
2	6	(Brazil) Nelson Piquet	Williams-Honda	65	+ 1.918	1	6
3	12	(Brazil) Ayrton Senna	Lotus-Honda	64	+ 1 lap	3	4
4	11	(Japan) Satoru Nakajima	Lotus-Honda	63	+ 2 laps	12	3
5	17	(United Kingdom) Derek Warwick	Arrows-Megatron	63	+ 2 laps	13	2
6	19	(Italy) Teo Fabi	Benetton-Ford	63	+ 2 laps	6	1
7	20	(Belgium) Thierry Boutsen	Benetton-Ford	62	+ 3 laps	5	
8 (1)	3	(United Kingdom) Jonathan Palmer	Tyrrell-Ford	60	+ 5 laps	23	
9 (2)	14	(France) Pascal Fabre	AGS-Ford	59	+ 6 laps	25	
Ret	4	(France) Philippe Streiff	Tyrrell-Ford	57	Engine	22	
NC	9	(United Kingdom) Martin Brundle	Zakspeed	54	+ 11 laps	17	
Ret	1	(France) Alain Prost	McLaren-TAG	53	Engine	4	
Ret	27	(Italy) Michele Alboreto	Ferrari	52	Suspension	7	
Ret	18	(United States) Eddie Cheever	Arrows-Megatron	45	Engine	14	
Ret	23	(Spain) Adrián Campos	Minardi-Motori Moderni	34	Fuel system	19	
Ret	21	(Italy) Alex Caffi	Osella-Alfa Romeo	32	Engine	20	
Ret	10	(West Germany) Christian Danner	Zakspeed	32	Gearbox	18	
Ret	7	(Italy) Riccardo Patrese	Brabham-BMW	28	Turbo	11	
Ret	2	(Sweden) Stefan Johansson	McLaren-TAG	18	Engine	10	
Ret	24	(Italy) Alessandro Nannini	Minardi-Motori Moderni	10	Engine	15	
Ret	8	(Italy) Andrea de Cesaris	Brabham-BMW	8	Turbo	9	
Ret	28	(Austria) Gerhard Berger	Ferrari	7	Accident	8	
Ret	30	(France) Philippe Alliot	Lola-Ford	7	Gearbox	21	
Ret	25	(France) René Arnoux	Ligier-Megatron	3	Electrical	16	
Ret	16	(Italy) Ivan Capelli	March-Ford	3	Accident	24	
EX	26	(Italy) Piercarlo Ghinzani	Ligier-Megatron	0	Excluded	19	

- ^1* Piercarlo Ghinzani was excluded from the race due to refuelling his car on the track during qualifying.

== Championship standings after the race ==
Drivers' Championship standings

Pos	Driver	Points
1	(Brazil) Ayrton Senna	31
2	(United Kingdom) Nigel Mansell	30
3	(Brazil) Nelson Piquet	30
4	(France) Alain Prost	26
5	(Sweden) Stefan Johansson	13

Constructors' Championship standings

Pos	Constructor	Points
1	(United Kingdom) Williams-Honda	60
2	(United Kingdom) McLaren-TAG	39
3	(United Kingdom) Lotus-Honda	37
4	(Italy) Ferrari	17
5	(United Kingdom) Arrows-Megatron	6

Jim Clark Trophy standings

Pos	Driver	Points
1	(United Kingdom) Jonathan Palmer	42
2	(France) Pascal Fabre	34
3	(France) Philippe Streiff	30
4	(France) Philippe Alliot	15
5	(Italy) Ivan Capelli	6

Colin Chapman Trophy standings

Pos	Constructor	Points
1	(United Kingdom) Tyrrell-Ford	72
2	(France) AGS-Ford	32
3	(France) Lola-Ford	15
4	(United Kingdom) March-Ford	6

- Note: Only the top five positions are included for all four sets of standings.

Previous race: 1987 French Grand Prix	FIA Formula One World Championship; 1987 season	Next race: 1987 German Grand Prix
Previous race: 1986 British Grand Prix	British Grand Prix	Next race: 1988 British Grand Prix
