= Franco Forini =

Swiss racing driver (born 1958)

- Born: 22 September 1958 (age 68); Muralto, Ticino, Switzerland

Formula One World Championship career
- Nationality: (Switzerland) Swiss
- Active years: 1987
- Team: Osella
- Entries: 3 (2 starts)
- Championships: 0
- Wins: 0
- Podiums: 0
- Career points: 0
- Pole positions: 0
- Fastest laps: 0
- First entry: 1987 Italian Grand Prix
- Last entry: 1987 Spanish Grand Prix

Franco Forini (born 22 September 1958) is a former racing driver from Switzerland. He competed in the Italian Formula Three Championship between 1981 and 1985, winning the title in his final year in a Dallara-Volkswagen with future Formula One team Forti Corse, and finishing as runner up in the Monaco Grand Prix Formula 3 support race in the same year. He moved up to Formula 3000 in 1986 with little success. He participated in three Formula One Grands Prix, debuting on 6 September 1987. He scored no championship points.

After his brief stint in Formula One, Forini returned to Formula 3 in 1988 and 1989 without any further success. He later ran a transportation and shipment company in Minusio.

== Complete Formula One results ==
(key)

| Year | Entrant | Chassis | Engine | 1 | 2 | 3 | 4 | 5 | 6 | 7 | 8 | 9 | 10 | 11 | 12 | 13 | 14 | 15 | 16 | WDC | Pts |
|---|---|---|---|---|---|---|---|---|---|---|---|---|---|---|---|---|---|---|---|---|---|
| 1987 | Osella Squadra Corse | Osella FA1G | Alfa Romeo 890T 1.5 V8t | BRA | SMR | BEL | MON | DET | FRA | GBR | GER | HUN | AUT | ITA; Ret | POR; Ret | ESP; DNQ | MEX | JPN | AUS | NC | 0 |

Sporting positions
| Preceded by Alessandro Santin | Italian Formula Three Champion; 1985 | Succeeded by Nicola Larini |
