= 1987 Spanish Grand Prix =

- Race 13 of 16 in the 1987 Formula One World Championship

Race details
- Date: 27 September 1987
- Location: Circuito Permanente de Jerez, Jerez de la Frontera, Spain
- Course: Permanent racing facility
- Course length: 4.218 km (2.620 miles)
- Distance: 72 laps, 303.696 km (188.708 miles)
- Weather: Sunny and hot

Pole position
Driver	(Brazil) Nelson Piquet	Williams-Honda
- Time: 1:22.461

Fastest lap
Driver	(Austria) Gerhard Berger	Ferrari
- Time: 1:26.986 on lap 49

Podium
First	(United Kingdom) Nigel Mansell	Williams-Honda
Second	(France) Alain Prost	McLaren-TAG
Third	(Sweden) Stefan Johansson	McLaren-TAG

The 1987 Spanish Grand Prix was a Formula One motor race held at Jerez on 27 September 1987. It was the thirteenth race of the 1987 Formula One World Championship. It was the 29th Spanish Grand Prix and the second to be held at Jerez. The race was held over 72 laps of the 4.22-kilometre (2.62 mi) circuit for a race distance of 304 kilometres (189 mi).

The race was won from pole position by British driver Nigel Mansell, driving a Williams-Honda. It was Mansell's fifth victory of 1987 and the eighth for the Williams team, securing them their second consecutive Constructors' Championship and fourth in all. Frenchman Alain Prost finished second in a McLaren-TAG, some 22 seconds behind Mansell, with Swedish teammate Stefan Johansson third. Mansell's teammate and Drivers' Championship rival, Brazilian Nelson Piquet, finished fourth. Prost achieved his 55th podium finish at this race, surpassing the record of Niki Lauda.

The win moved Mansell ahead of Ayrton Senna, who finished fifth in his Lotus-Honda, into second place in the Drivers' Championship, albeit 18 points behind Piquet with three races remaining.

== Summary ==
Nelson Piquet secured his 24th and final F1 pole position in his Williams-Honda with Nigel Mansell completing an all-Williams front row. The race was comfortably won by Mansell who passed Piquet at the end of the first lap and was never headed. The battle for third (then second) was led for much of the time by Ayrton Senna, who like the previous year tried to complete the race without changing tyres. Both Senna and Lotus were of the opinion that the 99T's computerised active suspension system would help preserve his tyres throughout the race.

Senna had a queue of both Ferraris, Prost's McLaren and Thierry Boutsen's Benetton behind him, which was joined by Piquet after a long pit-stop. For lap after lap, Senna held off all-comers, similar to Gilles Villeneuve's performance in his Ferrari at Jarama for the 1981 Spanish Grand Prix. The Lotus-Honda was very fast in a straight line with a low downforce setup, but was slow through Jerez's many twists and turns as a result. Senna's pursuers could not pass him on the long pit straight, and with Jerez generally having a lot of dust and sand off the racing line, they were not able pass him through the corners without losing grip.

However, Piquet's similarly powered Williams was able to get by (not before having a spin) followed eventually by Boutsen and Prost as the Brazilian's tyres finally went off. Senna faded to finish fifth, but the battle for second continued between Boutsen and Piquet - Boutsen went out avoiding Piquet who was rejoining the track after having gone off - and then between Piquet and Prost, with Prost getting the better of the Williams driver who also lost third place to McLaren's Stefan Johansson who put in another strong drive. Both Ferraris blew their engines.

Martin Brundle, who finished 11th in his Zakspeed, described his drive as "the time I got out the car thinking no human could have done [any] better".

== Classification ==
=== Qualifying ===
Pos	No	Driver	Constructor	Q1	Q2	Gap
1	6	(Brazil) Nelson Piquet	Williams-Honda	1:23.621	1:22.461	
2	5	(United Kingdom) Nigel Mansell	Williams-Honda	1:23.081	no time	+0.620
3	28	(Austria) Gerhard Berger	Ferrari	1:23.164	1:25.250	+0.703
4	27	(Italy) Michele Alboreto	Ferrari	1:24.192	1:24.832	+1.731
5	12	(Brazil) Ayrton Senna	Lotus-Honda	1:25.162	1:24.320	+1.859
6	19	(Italy) Teo Fabi	Benetton-Ford	1:25.263	1:24.523	+2.062
7	1	(France) Alain Prost	McLaren-TAG	1:24.596	1:24.905	+2.135
8	20	(Belgium) Thierry Boutsen	Benetton-Ford	1:26.372	1:25.295	+2.834
9	7	(Italy) Riccardo Patrese	Brabham-BMW	1:26.639	1:25.335	+2.874
10	8	(Italy) Andrea de Cesaris	Brabham-BMW	1:31.981	1:25.811	+3.350
11	2	(Sweden) Stefan Johansson	McLaren-TAG	1:26.147	1:26.147	+3.686
12	17	(United Kingdom) Derek Warwick	Arrows-Megatron	1:26.728	1:26.882	+4.267
13	18	(United States) Eddie Cheever	Arrows-Megatron	1:27.062	1:27.970	+4.601
14	25	(France) René Arnoux	Ligier-Megatron	1:28.241	1:28.362	+5.780
15	4	(France) Philippe Streiff	Tyrrell-Ford	1:28.970	1:28.330	+5.869
16	3	(United Kingdom) Jonathan Palmer	Tyrrell-Ford	1:28.353	1:28.426	+5.892
17	30	(France) Philippe Alliot	Lola-Ford	1:29.147	1:28.361	+5.900
18	11	(Japan) Satoru Nakajima	Lotus-Honda	1:28.776	1:28.367	+5.906
19	16	(Italy) Ivan Capelli	March-Ford	1:28.477	1:28.694	+6.016
20	9	(United Kingdom) Martin Brundle	Zakspeed	1:28.876	1:28.597	+6.136
21	24	(Italy) Alessandro Nannini	Minardi-Motori Moderni	1:28.823	1:28.602	+6.141
22	10	(West Germany) Christian Danner	Zakspeed	1:30.325	1:28.667	+6.206
23	26	(Italy) Piercarlo Ghinzani	Ligier-Megatron	1:29.663	1:29.066	+6.605
24	23	(Spain) Adrián Campos	Minardi-Motori Moderni	1:29.538	1:30.204	+7.077
25	14	(France) Pascal Fabre	AGS-Ford	1:32.490	1:30.694	+8.233
26	32	(Italy) Nicola Larini	Coloni-Ford	1:31.319	1:30.982	+8.521
DNQ	21	(Italy) Alex Caffi	Osella-Alfa Romeo	1:31.284	1:31.069	+8.608
DNQ	22	(Switzerland) Franco Forini	Osella-Alfa Romeo	1:34.723	1:35.572	+12.262

=== Race ===
Pos	No	Driver	Constructor	Laps	Time/Retired	Grid	Points
1	5	(United Kingdom) Nigel Mansell	Williams-Honda	72	1:49:12.692	2	9
2	1	(France) Alain Prost	McLaren-TAG	72	+ 22.225	7	6
3	2	(Sweden) Stefan Johansson	McLaren-TAG	72	+ 30.818	11	4
4	6	(Brazil) Nelson Piquet	Williams-Honda	72	+ 31.450	1	3
5	12	(Brazil) Ayrton Senna	Lotus-Honda	72	+ 1:13.507	5	2
6 (1)	30	(France) Philippe Alliot	Lola-Ford	71	+ 1 lap	17	1
7 (2)	4	(France) Philippe Streiff	Tyrrell-Ford	71	+ 1 lap	15	
8	18	(United States) Eddie Cheever	Arrows-Megatron	70	Out of fuel	13	
9	11	(Japan) Satoru Nakajima	Lotus-Honda	70	+ 2 laps	18	
10	17	(United Kingdom) Derek Warwick	Arrows-Megatron	70	+ 2 laps	12	
11	9	(United Kingdom) Martin Brundle	Zakspeed	70	+ 2 laps	20	
12 (3)	16	(Italy) Ivan Capelli	March-Ford	70	+ 2 laps	19	
13	7	(Italy) Riccardo Patrese	Brabham-BMW	68	+ 4 laps	9	
14	23	(Spain) Adrián Campos	Minardi-Motori Moderni	68	+ 4 laps	24	
15	27	(Italy) Michele Alboreto	Ferrari	67	Engine	4	
16	20	(Belgium) Thierry Boutsen	Benetton-Ford	66	Accident	8	
Ret	28	(Austria) Gerhard Berger	Ferrari	62	Engine	3	
Ret	3	(United Kingdom) Jonathan Palmer	Tyrrell-Ford	55	Collision	16	
Ret	25	(France) René Arnoux	Ligier-Megatron	55	Collision	14	
Ret	10	(West Germany) Christian Danner	Zakspeed	50	Transmission	22	
Ret	24	(Italy) Alessandro Nannini	Minardi-Motori Moderni	45	Turbo	21	
Ret	19	(Italy) Teo Fabi	Benetton-Ford	40	Brakes	6	
Ret	8	(Italy) Andrea de Cesaris	Brabham-BMW	26	Gearbox	10	
Ret	26	(Italy) Piercarlo Ghinzani	Ligier-Megatron	24	Ignition	23	
Ret	14	(France) Pascal Fabre	AGS-Ford	10	Clutch	25	
Ret	32	(Italy) Nicola Larini	Coloni-Ford	8	Suspension	26	

- Numbers in brackets refer to positions of normally aspirated entrants competing for the Jim Clark Trophy.

== Championship standings after the race ==
Drivers' Championship standings

Pos	Driver	Points
1	(Brazil) Nelson Piquet	70
2	(United Kingdom) Nigel Mansell	52
3	(Brazil) Ayrton Senna	51
4	(France) Alain Prost	46
5	(Sweden) Stefan Johansson	26

Constructors' Championship standings

Pos	Constructor	Points
1	(United Kingdom) Williams-Honda	122
2	(United Kingdom) McLaren-TAG	72
3	(United Kingdom) Lotus-Honda	57
4	(Italy) Ferrari	26
5	(United Kingdom) Benetton-Ford	20

Jim Clark Trophy standings

Pos	Driver	Points
1	(United Kingdom) Jonathan Palmer	71
2	(France) Philippe Streiff	64
3	(Italy) Ivan Capelli	38
4	(France) Pascal Fabre	35
5	(France) Philippe Alliot	34

Colin Chapman Trophy standings

Pos	Constructor	Points
1	(United Kingdom) Tyrrell-Ford	135
2	(United Kingdom) March-Ford	38
3	(France) AGS-Ford	35
4	(France) Lola-Ford	34

- Note: Only the top five positions are included for all four sets of standings.

Previous race: 1987 Portuguese Grand Prix	FIA Formula One World Championship; 1987 season	Next race: 1987 Mexican Grand Prix
Previous race: 1986 Spanish Grand Prix	Spanish Grand Prix	Next race: 1988 Spanish Grand Prix
