= 1987 Italian Grand Prix =

- Race 11 of 16 in the 1987 Formula One World Championship
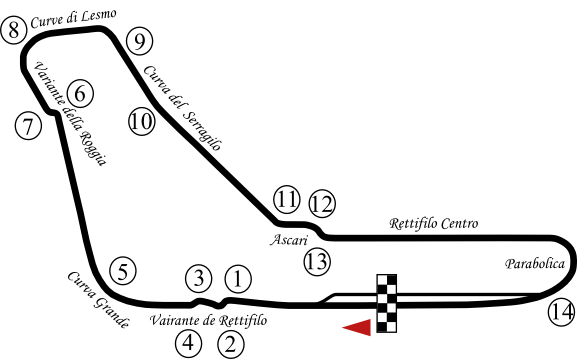

Race details
- Date: 6 September 1987
- Official name: 58º Gran Premio d'Italia
- Location: Autodromo Nazionale di Monza, Monza
- Course: Permanent racing facility
- Course length: 5.800 km (3.604 miles)
- Distance: 50 laps, 290.00 km (180.2 miles)
- Weather: Dry

Pole position
Driver	(Brazil) Nelson Piquet	Williams-Honda
- Time: 1:23.460

Fastest lap
Driver	(Brazil) Ayrton Senna	Lotus-Honda
- Time: 1:26.796 on lap 49

Podium
First	(Brazil) Nelson Piquet	Williams-Honda
Second	(Brazil) Ayrton Senna	Lotus-Honda
Third	(United Kingdom) Nigel Mansell	Williams-Honda

The 1987 Italian Grand Prix was a Formula One motor race held at Monza on 6 September 1987. It was the eleventh race of the 1987 Formula One World Championship. It was the 57th Italian Grand Prix and the 52nd to be held at Monza. The race was held over 50 laps of the 5.8-kilometre (3.6 mi) circuit for a race distance of 290 kilometres (180 mi).

The race was won from pole position by Brazilian driver Nelson Piquet, driving a Williams-Honda. Piquet took his third victory of the season by 1.8 seconds from compatriot Ayrton Senna, who led in his Lotus-Honda before running wide at the Parabolica with eight laps to go. Piquet's British team-mate, Nigel Mansell, finished third, nearly 50 seconds adrift. It was also the sixth consecutive victory for the Williams team, a run of wins that had begun at the French Grand Prix in early July.

French Tyrrell driver Philippe Streiff was the first naturally aspirated Jim Clark Trophy car to finish in 12th, three laps down on Piquet.

The win strengthened Piquet's championship points lead to 14 points over Senna and 20 over Mansell.

During qualifying, Piquet recorded a speed of 352.135 km/h (218.807 mph), the fastest achieved by a Formula One car during the first turbo era of the sport (1977–88). Like Lotus, Williams had been working on their own computer controlled Active suspension. However, unlike Lotus who had been running theirs all season on the 99T in a bid to try to gain a technical advantage, this was the debut Grand Prix for the Williams version, called "Williams Reactive Ride" (Lotus allegedly had a legal copyright on the Active Suspension name), with Williams Technical Director Patrick Head preferring to get the system right before trying to figure it out on the run in the limited time available during a race meeting. Nigel Mansell had little faith in the system after disastrous results with the original Lotus Active Suspension in 1982–1983. Piquet's faith in the suspension system however was absolute after completing a full race distance test session at Imola (albeit on a virtually deserted track), finishing 3 minutes faster than Mansell's win there earlier in the year. By using the Reactive car, Piquet was able to run less wing than his teammate and was over 5 mph (8.0 km/h) faster through the speed trap than Mansell in the passive FW11B.

Due to the entries of AGS and Coloni, for the first time in the 1987 season, there would be drivers who would fail to qualify for the race - in this case, it was to be Nicola Larini in the Coloni and Pascal Fabre in the AGS.

This was the first F1 race since the death of former Ferrari driver Didier Pironi, subsequently the Tifosi paid tribute during the weekend. It was Piquet's last win for three years, his next win coming at the 1990 Japanese Grand Prix.

== Classification ==
=== Qualifying ===
Pos	No	Driver	Constructor	Q1	Q2	Gap
1	6	(Brazil) Nelson Piquet	Williams-Honda	1:24.617	1:23.460	
2	5	(United Kingdom) Nigel Mansell	Williams-Honda	1:24.350	1:23.559	+0.099
3	28	(Austria) Gerhard Berger	Ferrari	1:25.211	1:23.933	+0.473
4	12	(Brazil) Ayrton Senna	Lotus-Honda	1:25.535	1:24.907	+1.447
5	1	(France) Alain Prost	McLaren-TAG	1:25.340	1:24.946	+1.486
6	20	(Belgium) Thierry Boutsen	Benetton-Ford	1:25.250	1:25.004	+1.544
7	19	(Italy) Teo Fabi	Benetton-Ford	1:26.894	1:25.020	+1.560
8	27	(Italy) Michele Alboreto	Ferrari	1:25.290	1:25.247	+1.787
9	7	(Italy) Riccardo Patrese	Brabham-BMW	1:26.453	1:25.525	+2.065
10	8	(Italy) Andrea de Cesaris	Brabham-BMW	1:40.285	1:26.802	+3.342
11	2	(Sweden) Stefan Johansson	McLaren-TAG	1:27.420	1:27.031	+3.571
12	17	(United Kingdom) Derek Warwick	Arrows-Megatron	1:27.543	1:28.083	+4.083
13	18	(United States) Eddie Cheever	Arrows-Megatron	1:29.273	1:28.022	+4.562
14	11	(Japan) Satoru Nakajima	Lotus-Honda	1:28.463	1:28.160	+4.700
15	25	(France) René Arnoux	Ligier-Megatron	1:28.946	no time	+5.486
16	10	(West Germany) Christian Danner	Zakspeed	1:30.389	1:29.465	+6.005
17	9	(United Kingdom) Martin Brundle	Zakspeed	1:30.144	1:29.725	+6.265
18	24	(Italy) Alessandro Nannini	Minardi-Motori Moderni	1:29.738	1:31.069	+6.278
19	26	(Italy) Piercarlo Ghinzani	Ligier-Megatron	1:29.898	no time	+6.438
20	23	(Spain) Adrián Campos	Minardi-Motori Moderni	1:31.094	1:30.782	+7.322
21	21	(Italy) Alex Caffi	Osella-Alfa Romeo	1:32.768	1:31.029	+7.569
22	3	(United Kingdom) Jonathan Palmer	Tyrrell-Ford	1:34.218	1:33.028	+9.568
23	30	(France) Philippe Alliot	Lola-Ford	1:34.748	1:33.170	+9.710
24	4	(France) Philippe Streiff	Tyrrell-Ford	1:34.760	1:33.264	+9.804
25	16	(Italy) Ivan Capelli	March-Ford	1:34.205	1:33.311	+9.851
26	22	(Switzerland) Franco Forini	Osella-Alfa Romeo	1:34.467	1:33.816	+10.356
DNQ	32	(Italy) Nicola Larini	Coloni-Ford	1:38.460	1:35.721	+12.261
DNQ	14	(France) Pascal Fabre	AGS-Ford	1:39.393	1:36.679	+13.219

=== Race ===
Numbers in brackets refer to positions of normally aspirated entrants competing for the Jim Clark Trophy.

Pos	No	Driver	Constructor	Laps	Time/Retired	Grid	Points
1	6	(Brazil) Nelson Piquet	Williams-Honda	50	1:14:47.707	1	9
2	12	(Brazil) Ayrton Senna	Lotus-Honda	50	+ 1.806	4	6
3	5	(United Kingdom) Nigel Mansell	Williams-Honda	50	+ 49.036	2	4
4	28	(Austria) Gerhard Berger	Ferrari	50	+ 57.979	3	3
5	20	(Belgium) Thierry Boutsen	Benetton-Ford	50	+ 1:21.319	6	2
6	2	(Sweden) Stefan Johansson	McLaren-TAG	50	+ 1:28.787	11	1
7	19	(Italy) Teo Fabi	Benetton-Ford	49	+ 1 lap	7	
8	26	(Italy) Piercarlo Ghinzani	Ligier-Megatron	48	+ 2 laps	19	
9	10	(West Germany) Christian Danner	Zakspeed	48	+ 2 laps	16	
10	25	(France) René Arnoux	Ligier-Megatron	48	+ 2 laps	15	
11	11	(Japan) Satoru Nakajima	Lotus-Honda	47	+ 3 laps	14	
12 (1)	4	(France) Philippe Streiff	Tyrrell-Ford	47	+ 3 laps	24	
13 (2)	16	(Italy) Ivan Capelli	March-Ford	47	+ 3 laps	25	
14 (3)	3	(United Kingdom) Jonathan Palmer	Tyrrell-Ford	47	+ 3 laps	22	
15	1	(France) Alain Prost	McLaren-TAG	46	+ 4 laps	5	
16	24	(Italy) Alessandro Nannini	Minardi-Motori Moderni	45	+ 5 laps	18	
Ret	9	(United Kingdom) Martin Brundle	Zakspeed	43	Gearbox	17	
Ret	30	(France) Philippe Alliot	Lola-Ford	37	Spun off	23	
Ret	23	(Spain) Adrián Campos	Minardi-Motori Moderni	34	Engine	20	
Ret	18	(United States) Eddie Cheever	Arrows-Megatron	27	Halfshaft	13	
Ret	22	(Switzerland) Franco Forini	Osella-Alfa Romeo	27	Turbo	26	
Ret	21	(Italy) Alex Caffi	Osella-Alfa Romeo	16	Suspension	21	
Ret	27	(Italy) Michele Alboreto	Ferrari	13	Turbo	8	
Ret	17	(United Kingdom) Derek Warwick	Arrows-Megatron	9	Electrical	12	
Ret	8	(Italy) Andrea de Cesaris	Brabham-BMW	7	Suspension	10	
Ret	7	(Italy) Riccardo Patrese	Brabham-BMW	5	Engine	9	

== Championship standings after the race ==
Drivers' Championship standings

Pos	Driver	Points
1	(Brazil) Nelson Piquet	63
2	(Brazil) Ayrton Senna	49
3	(United Kingdom) Nigel Mansell	43
4	(France) Alain Prost	31
5	(Sweden) Stefan Johansson	20

Constructors' Championship standings

Pos	Constructor	Points
1	(United Kingdom) Williams-Honda	106
2	(United Kingdom) Lotus-Honda	55
3	(United Kingdom) McLaren-TAG	51
4	(Italy) Ferrari	20
5	(United Kingdom) Benetton-Ford	17

Jim Clark Trophy standings

Pos	Driver	Points
1	(United Kingdom) Jonathan Palmer	65
2	(France) Philippe Streiff	54
3	(France) Pascal Fabre	35
4	(France) Philippe Alliot	25
5	(Italy) Ivan Capelli	25

Colin Chapman Trophy standings

Pos	Constructor	Points
1	(United Kingdom) Tyrrell-Ford	119
2	(France) AGS-Ford	35
3	(France) Lola-Ford	25
4	(United Kingdom) March-Ford	25

- Note: Only the top five positions are included for all four sets of standings.

Previous race: 1987 Austrian Grand Prix	FIA Formula One World Championship; 1987 season	Next race: 1987 Portuguese Grand Prix
Previous race: 1986 Italian Grand Prix	Italian Grand Prix	Next race: 1988 Italian Grand Prix
