= 1987 Portuguese Grand Prix =

- Race 12 of 16 in the 1987 Formula One World Championship
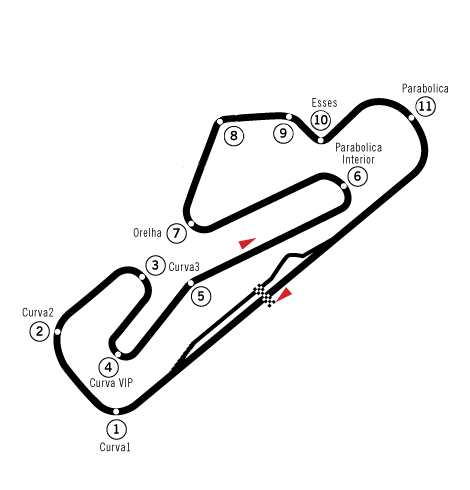

Race details
- Date: 20 September 1987
- Official name: 16º Grande Prémio de Portugal
- Location: Autódromo do Estoril, Estoril, Portugal
- Course: Permanent Racing Facility
- Course length: 4.35 km (2.702 miles)
- Distance: 70 laps, 304.5 km (189.14 miles)
- Weather: Dry

Pole position
Driver	(Austria) Gerhard Berger	Ferrari
- Time: 1:17.620

Fastest lap
Driver	(Austria) Gerhard Berger	Ferrari
- Time: 1:19.282 on lap 66

Podium
First	(France) Alain Prost	McLaren-TAG
Second	(Austria) Gerhard Berger	Ferrari
Third	(Brazil) Nelson Piquet	Williams-Honda

The 1987 Portuguese Grand Prix was a Formula One motor race held at Estoril on 20 September 1987. It was the twelfth race of the 1987 Formula One World Championship. It was the 16th Portuguese Grand Prix and the fourth to be held at Estoril. The race was held over 70 laps of the 4.35-kilometre (2.7 mi) circuit for a race distance of 304.5 kilometres (189.2 mi).

The race was won by Frenchman Alain Prost, driving a McLaren-TAG, after he started from third position. Austrian driver Gerhard Berger took pole position in his Ferrari and led for most of the race, until he spun with three laps remaining. Prost duly went through to take his 28th Grand Prix victory, surpassing Jackie Stewart's all-time record; he also achieved his 54th podium finish, equalling Niki Lauda's record. Berger finished second, some 20 seconds behind Prost, with Drivers' Championship leader, Brazilian Nelson Piquet, third in his Williams-Honda.

The race was marred by a multi-car collision on the opening lap. Piquet and Michele Alboreto (Ferrari F1/87) collided at the start, with Derek Warwick (Arrows A10), Satoru Nakajima (Lotus 99T), Martin Brundle (Zakspeed 871), Christian Danner (Zakspeed 871), Philippe Alliot (Lola LC87), René Arnoux (Ligier JS29C) and Adrián Campos (Minardi M186) all involved in the ensuing accident. Only Danner was unable to restart as the Zakspeed team had only one usable car which went to Brundle.

With Piquet finishing third ahead of both Mansell and Senna, Piquet expanded his championship points lead to 18 points over Senna and 24 over Mansell.

== Classification ==
=== Qualifying ===
Pos	No	Driver	Constructor	Q1	Q2	Gap
1	28	(Austria) Gerhard Berger	Ferrari	1:18.448	1:17.620	
2	5	(United Kingdom) Nigel Mansell	Williams-Honda	1:17.951	1:18.235	+0.331
3	1	(France) Alain Prost	McLaren-TAG	1:18.404	1:17.994	+0.374
4	6	(Brazil) Nelson Piquet	Williams-Honda	1:18.164	no time	+0.544
5	12	(Brazil) Ayrton Senna	Lotus-Honda	1:18.382	1:18.354	+0.734
6	27	(Italy) Michele Alboreto	Ferrari	1:20.069	1:18.540	+0.920
7	7	(Italy) Riccardo Patrese	Brabham-BMW	1:21.506	1:19.965	+2.345
8	2	(Sweden) Stefan Johansson	McLaren-TAG	1:20.134	1:20.227	+2.514
9	20	(Belgium) Thierry Boutsen	Benetton-Ford	1:20.305	1:20.558	+2.685
10	19	(Italy) Teo Fabi	Benetton-Ford	1:20.483	1:20.548	+2.863
11	18	(United States) Eddie Cheever	Arrows-Megatron	1:21.324	1:21.207	+3.587
12	17	(United Kingdom) Derek Warwick	Arrows-Megatron	1:21.397	1:21.587	+3.777
13	8	(Italy) Andrea de Cesaris	Brabham-BMW	1:22.060	1:21.725	+4.105
14	24	(Italy) Alessandro Nannini	Minardi-Motori Moderni	1:21.784	1:22.128	+4.164
15	11	(Japan) Satoru Nakajima	Lotus-Honda	1:22.222	no time	+4.602
16	10	(West Germany) Christian Danner	Zakspeed	1:22.424	1:22.358	+4.738
17	9	(United Kingdom) Martin Brundle	Zakspeed	1:22.400	1:22.794	+4.780
18	25	(France) René Arnoux	Ligier-Megatron	1:23.637	1:23.237	+5.617
19	30	(France) Philippe Alliot	Lola-Ford	1:24.181	1:23.580	+5.960
20	23	(Spain) Adrián Campos	Minardi-Motori Moderni	1:24.822	1:23.591	+5.971
21	4	(France) Philippe Streiff	Tyrrell-Ford	1:23.810	1:24.436	+6.190
22	16	(Italy) Ivan Capelli	March-Ford	1:24.533	1:23.905	+6.285
23	26	(Italy) Piercarlo Ghinzani	Ligier-Megatron	1:24.105	1:24.979	+6.485
24	3	(United Kingdom) Jonathan Palmer	Tyrrell-Ford	1:24.392	1:24.217	+6.597
25	21	(Italy) Alex Caffi	Osella-Alfa Romeo	1:24.792	1:25.232	+7.172
26	22	(Switzerland) Franco Forini	Osella-Alfa Romeo	1:27.219	1:26.635	+9.015
DNQ	14	(France) Pascal Fabre	AGS-Ford	1:28.756	1:26.946	+9.326

=== Race ===
Numbers in brackets refer to positions of normally aspirated entrants competing for the Jim Clark Trophy.

Pos	No	Driver	Constructor	Laps	Time/Retired	Grid	Points
1	1	(France) Alain Prost	McLaren-TAG	70	1:37:03.906	3	9
2	28	(Austria) Gerhard Berger	Ferrari	70	+ 20.493	1	6
3	6	(Brazil) Nelson Piquet	Williams-Honda	70	+ 1:03.295	4	4
4	19	(Italy) Teo Fabi	Benetton-Ford	69	Out of fuel	10	3
5	2	(Sweden) Stefan Johansson	McLaren-TAG	69	+ 1 lap	8	2
6	18	(United States) Eddie Cheever	Arrows-Megatron	68	+ 2 laps	11	1
7	12	(Brazil) Ayrton Senna	Lotus-Honda	68	+ 2 laps	5	
8	11	(Japan) Satoru Nakajima	Lotus-Honda	68	+ 2 laps	15	
9 (1)	16	(Italy) Ivan Capelli	March-Ford	67	+ 3 laps	22	
10 (2)	3	(United Kingdom) Jonathan Palmer	Tyrrell-Ford	67	+ 3 laps	24	
11	24	(Italy) Alessandro Nannini	Minardi-Motori Moderni	66	Out of fuel	14	
12 (3)	4	(France) Philippe Streiff	Tyrrell-Ford	66	+ 4 laps	21	
13	17	(United Kingdom) Derek Warwick	Arrows-Megatron	66	+ 4 laps	12	
14	20	(Belgium) Thierry Boutsen	Benetton-Ford	64	+ 6 laps	9	
Ret	8	(Italy) Andrea de Cesaris	Brabham-BMW	54	Injection	13	
Ret	27	(Italy) Michele Alboreto	Ferrari	38	Gearbox	6	
Ret	9	(United Kingdom) Martin Brundle	Zakspeed	35	Gearbox	17	
Ret	22	(Switzerland) Franco Forini	Osella-Alfa Romeo	32	Suspension	26	
Ret	30	(France) Philippe Alliot	Lola-Ford	31	Engine	19	
Ret	25	(France) René Arnoux	Ligier-Megatron	29	Radiator	18	
Ret	21	(Italy) Alex Caffi	Osella-Alfa Romeo	27	Turbo	25	
Ret	26	(Italy) Piercarlo Ghinzani	Ligier-Megatron	24	Ignition	23	
Ret	23	(Spain) Adrián Campos	Minardi-Motori Moderni	24	Accident	20	
Ret	5	(United Kingdom) Nigel Mansell	Williams-Honda	13	Electrical	2	
Ret	7	(Italy) Riccardo Patrese	Brabham-BMW	13	Engine	7	
Ret	10	(West Germany) Christian Danner	Zakspeed	0	Accident	16	

== Championship standings after the race ==
Drivers' Championship standings

Pos	Driver	Points
1	(Brazil) Nelson Piquet	67
2	(Brazil) Ayrton Senna	49
3	(United Kingdom) Nigel Mansell	43
4	(France) Alain Prost	40
5	(Sweden) Stefan Johansson	22

Constructors' Championship standings

Pos	Constructor	Points
1	(United Kingdom) Williams-Honda	110
2	(United Kingdom) McLaren-TAG	62
3	(United Kingdom) Lotus-Honda	55
4	(Italy) Ferrari	26
5	(United Kingdom) Benetton-Ford	20

Jim Clark Trophy standings

Pos	Driver	Points
1	(United Kingdom) Jonathan Palmer	71
2	(France) Philippe Streiff	58
3	(France) Pascal Fabre	35
4	(Italy) Ivan Capelli	34
5	(France) Philippe Alliot	25

Colin Chapman Trophy standings

Pos	Constructor	Points
1	(United Kingdom) Tyrrell-Ford	129
2	(France) AGS-Ford	35
3	(United Kingdom) March-Ford	34
4	(France) Lola-Ford	25

- Note: Only the top five positions are included for all four sets of standings.

Previous race: 1987 Italian Grand Prix	FIA Formula One World Championship; 1987 season	Next race: 1987 Spanish Grand Prix
Previous race: 1986 Portuguese Grand Prix	Portuguese Grand Prix	Next race: 1988 Portuguese Grand Prix
