= 1987 Formula One World Championship =

41st season of FIA Formula One motor racing

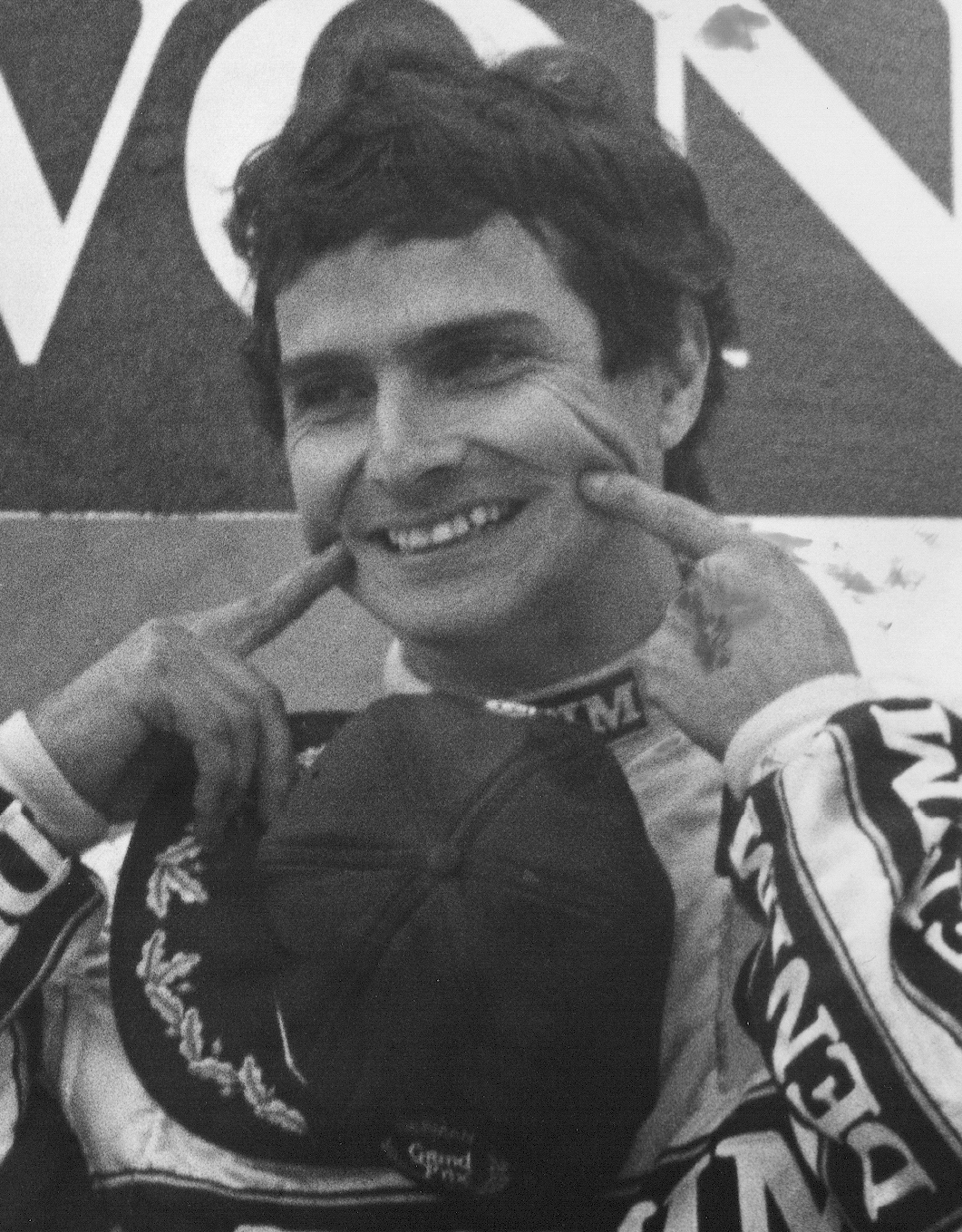
Nelson Piquet won his third and final Drivers' Championship, driving for Williams.

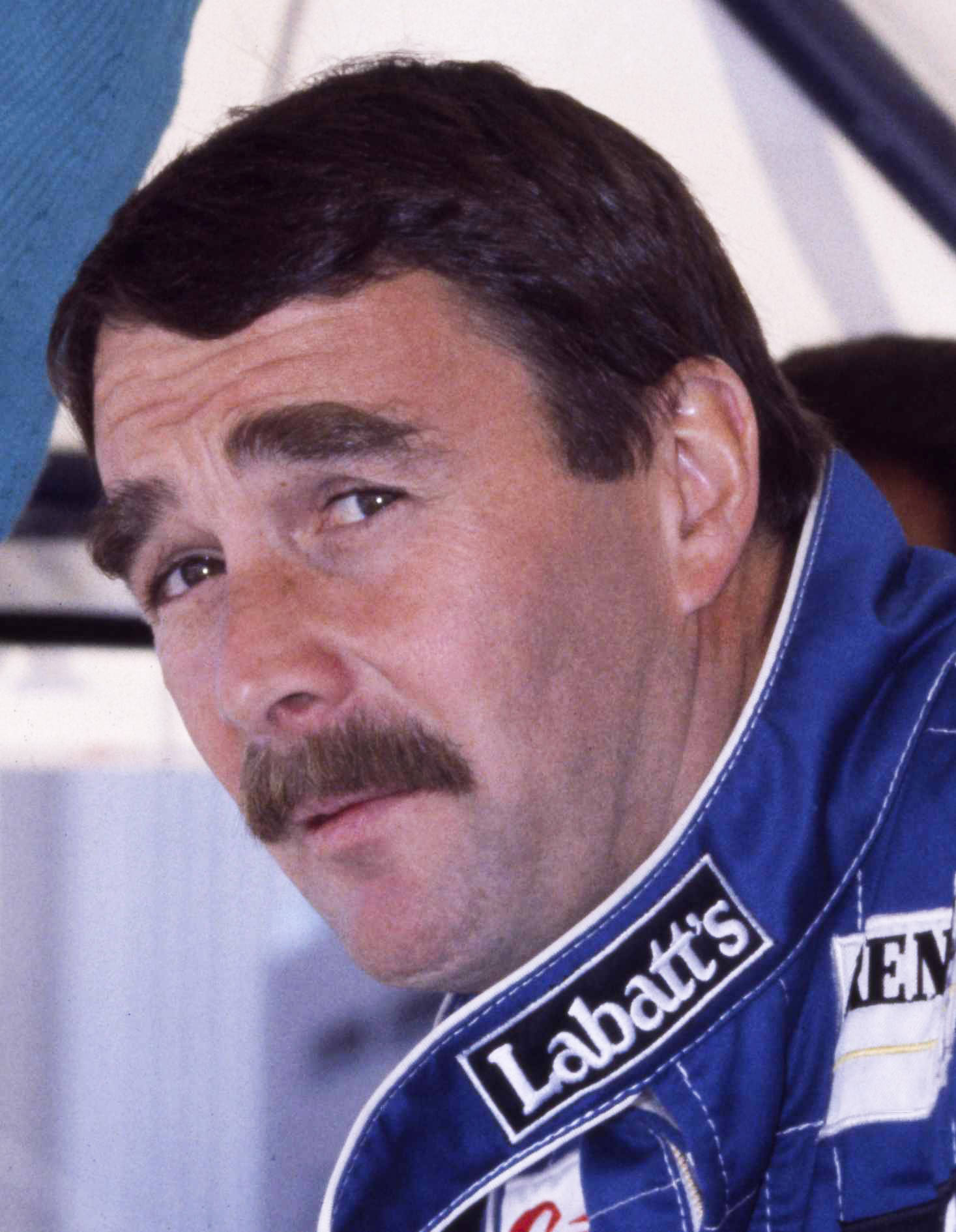
Piquet's teammate Nigel Mansell finished runner-up, despite having won more races than Piquet.

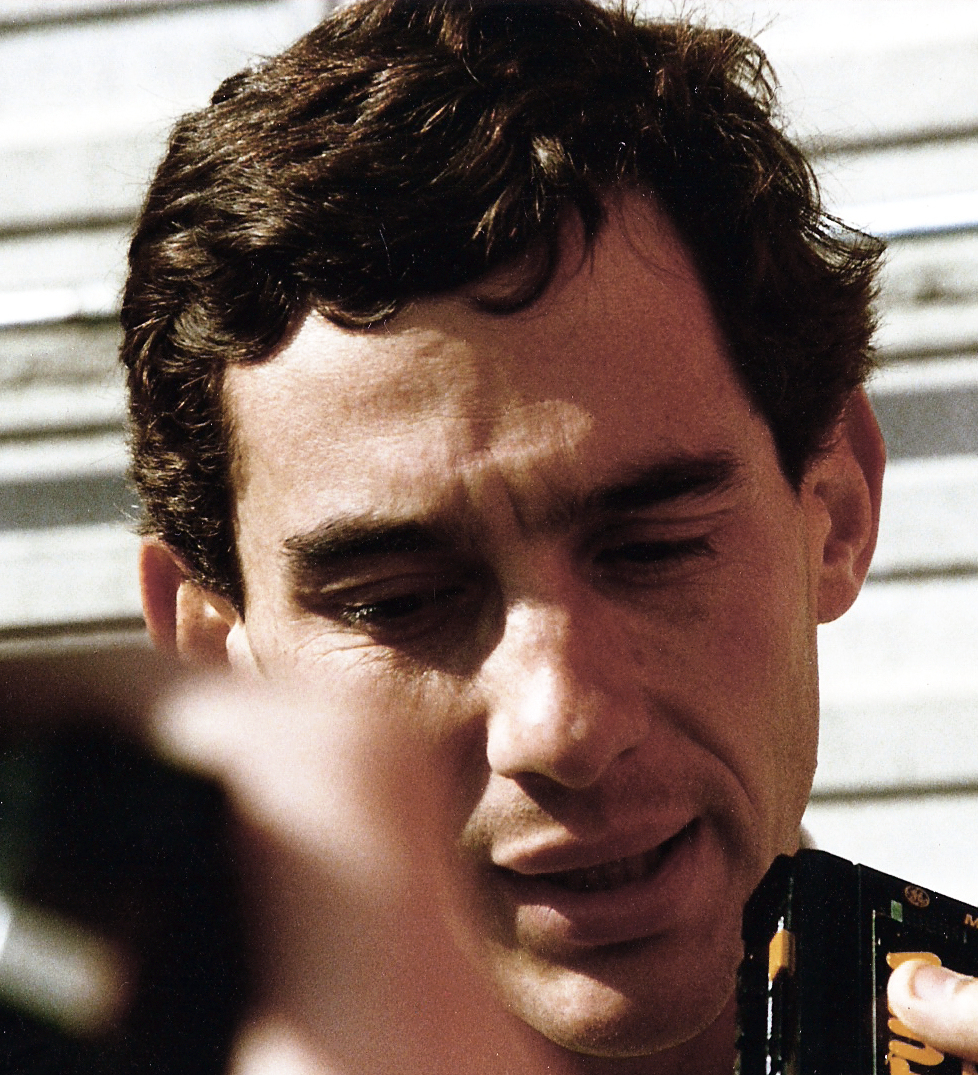
Ayrton Senna, driving for Lotus, finished third with 50 points more than his teammate Satoru Nakajima.

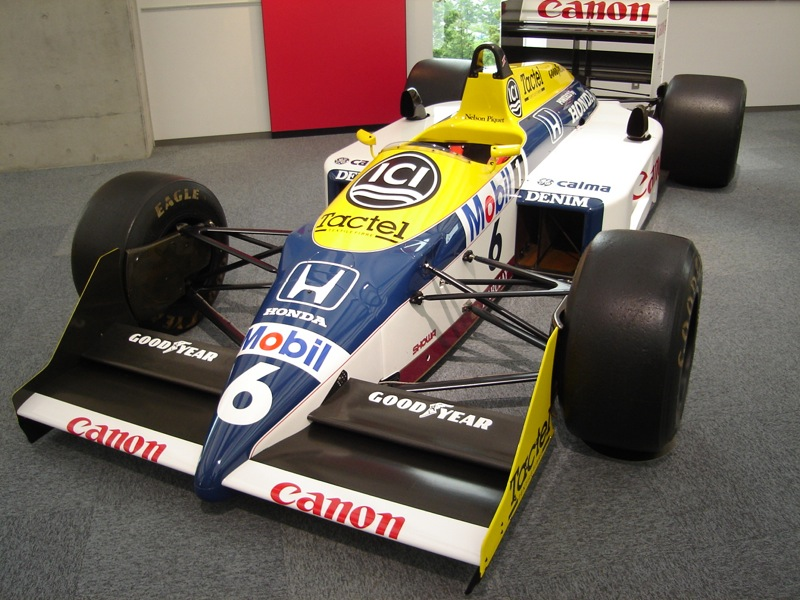
Williams-Honda won their second World Constructors' Championship in a row with the Williams FW11.

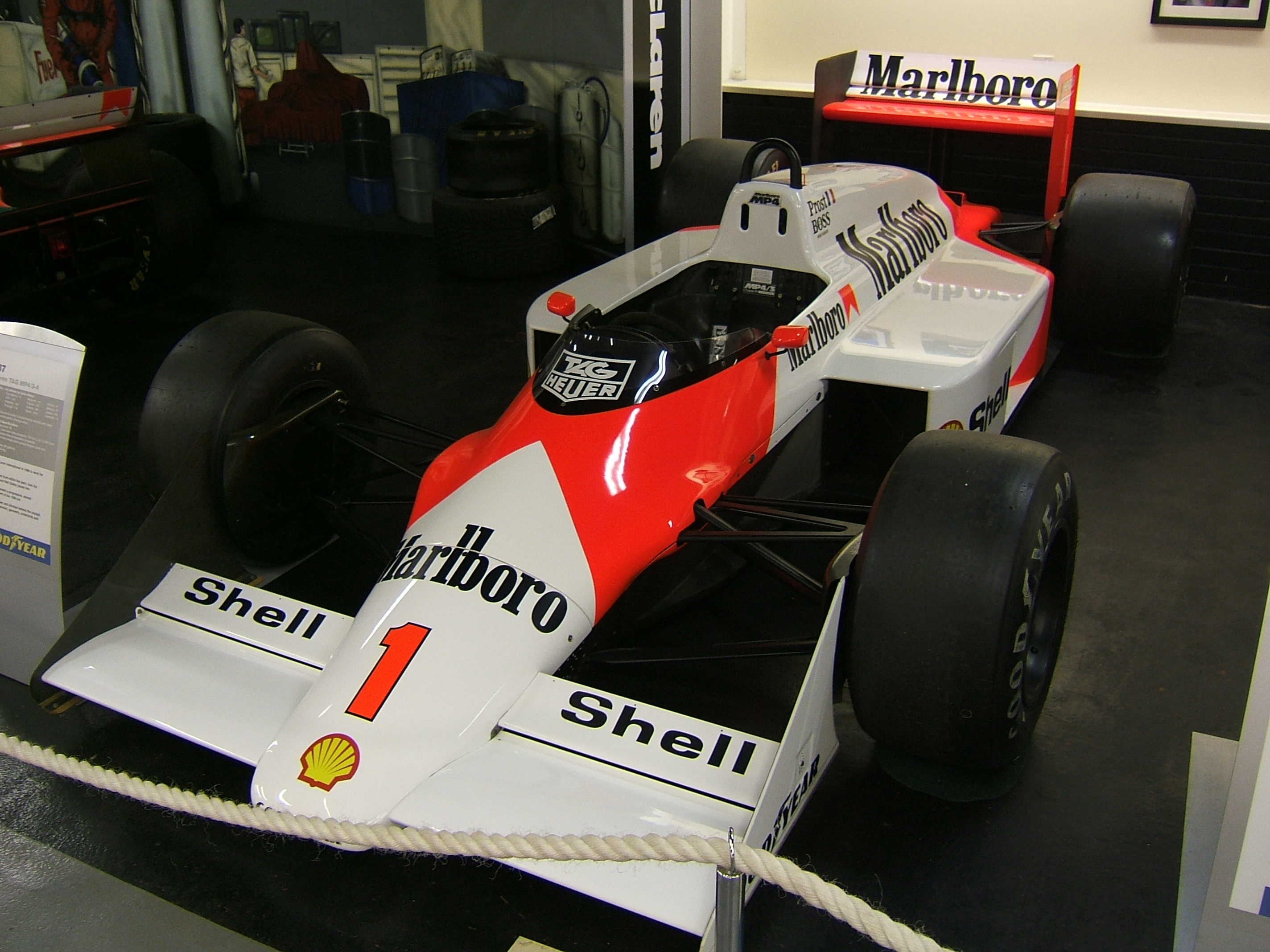
McLaren-TAG finished runner-up in the Constructors' Championship with the McLaren MP4/3.

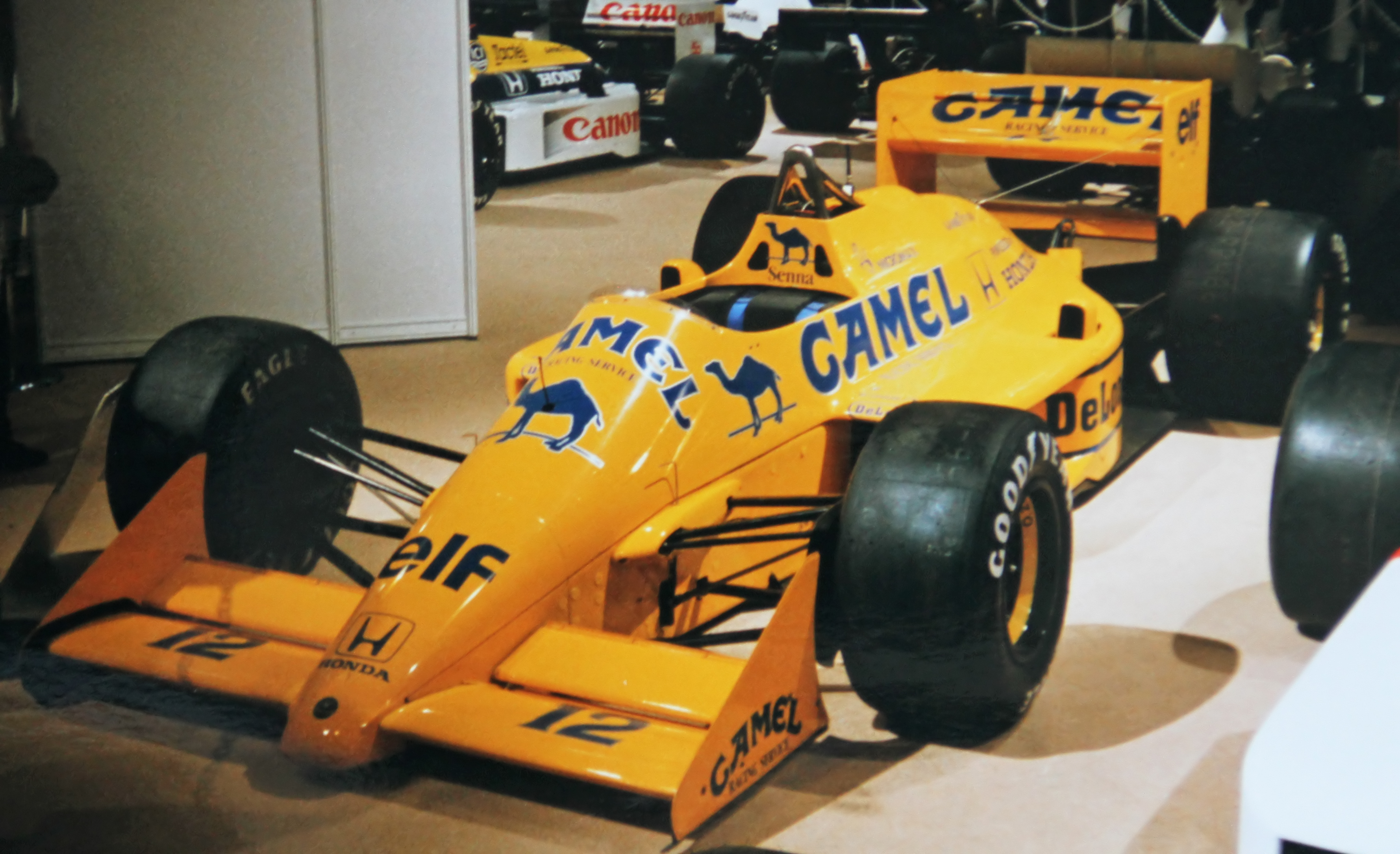
Lotus-Honda finished third in the Constructors' Championship with the Lotus 99T.

The 1987 FIA Formula One World Championship was the 41st season of FIA Formula One motor racing. It featured the 1987 Formula One World Championship for Drivers and the 1987 Formula One World Championship for Constructors, which were contested concurrently over a sixteen-race series that commenced on 12 April and ended on 15 November.

The World Championship for Drivers was won by Nelson Piquet for the third and final time. He won just three races, compared to his teammate and main rival Nigel Mansell with six wins, but Mansell had to give up the challenge when he crashed in practice for the Japanese Grand Prix and injured his back. The World Championship for Constructors was won by Williams-Honda for the second consecutive year. The season also encompassed the Jim Clark Trophy and the Colin Chapman Trophy, which were respectively contested by drivers and constructors of Formula One cars powered by naturally aspirated engines.

This was the first season since 1976 that Renault were absent as an engine supplier in the sport due to ongoing company restructuring.

Pirelli's withdrawal from F1 at the end of 1986 meant that Goodyear was the sole tyre supplier for 1987. It was the first season since 1963 that the sport featured a standard single tyre supplier.

== Drivers and constructors ==
The following drivers and constructors competed in the 1987 season. All teams competed with tyres supplied by Goodyear as Pirelli exited the sport after six seasons.

Entrant	Constructor	Chassis	Engine	No	Driver	Rounds
(United Kingdom) Marlboro McLaren TAG Turbo	McLaren-TAG	MP4/3	TAG/Porsche TTE PO1 1.5 V6 t	1	(France) Alain Prost	All
(United Kingdom) Marlboro McLaren TAG Turbo	McLaren-TAG	MP4/3	TAG/Porsche TTE PO1 1.5 V6 t	2	(Sweden) Stefan Johansson	All
(United Kingdom) Data General Team Tyrrell	Tyrrell-Ford	DG016	Ford Cosworth DFZ 3.5 V8	3	(United Kingdom) Jonathan Palmer	All
(United Kingdom) Data General Team Tyrrell	Tyrrell-Ford	DG016	Ford Cosworth DFZ 3.5 V8	4	(France) Philippe Streiff	All
(United Kingdom) Canon Williams Honda Team	Williams-Honda	FW11B	Honda RA167E 1.5 V6 t	5	(United Kingdom) Nigel Mansell	1–15
(United Kingdom) Canon Williams Honda Team	Williams-Honda	FW11B	Honda RA167E 1.5 V6 t	5	(Italy) Riccardo Patrese	16
(United Kingdom) Canon Williams Honda Team	Williams-Honda	FW11B	Honda RA167E 1.5 V6 t	6	(Brazil) Nelson Piquet	All
(United Kingdom) Brabham	Brabham-BMW	BT56	BMW M12/13 1.5 L4 t	7	(Italy) Riccardo Patrese	1–15
(United Kingdom) Brabham	Brabham-BMW	BT56	BMW M12/13 1.5 L4 t	7	(Italy) Stefano Modena	16
(United Kingdom) Brabham	Brabham-BMW	BT56	BMW M12/13 1.5 L4 t	8	(Italy) Andrea de Cesaris	All
(West Germany) West Zakspeed Racing	Zakspeed	861; 871	Zakspeed 1500/4 1.5 L4 t	9	(United Kingdom) Martin Brundle	All
(West Germany) West Zakspeed Racing	Zakspeed	861; 871	Zakspeed 1500/4 1.5 L4 t	10	(West Germany) Christian Danner	All
(United Kingdom) Camel Team Lotus Honda	Lotus-Honda	99T	Honda RA166E 1.5 V6 t	11	(Japan) Satoru Nakajima	All
(United Kingdom) Camel Team Lotus Honda	Lotus-Honda	99T	Honda RA166E 1.5 V6 t	12	(Brazil) Ayrton Senna	All
(France) El Charro	AGS-Ford	JH22	Ford Cosworth DFZ 3.5 V8	14	(France) Pascal Fabre	1–14
(France) El Charro	AGS-Ford	JH22	Ford Cosworth DFZ 3.5 V8	14	(Brazil) Roberto Moreno	15–16
(United Kingdom) Leyton House March Racing Team	March-Ford	87P; 871	Ford Cosworth DFZ 3.5 V8	16	(Italy) Ivan Capelli	All
(United Kingdom) USF&G Arrows Megatron	Arrows-Megatron	A10	Megatron M12/13 1.5 L4 t	17	(United Kingdom) Derek Warwick	All
(United Kingdom) USF&G Arrows Megatron	Arrows-Megatron	A10	Megatron M12/13 1.5 L4 t	18	(United States) Eddie Cheever	All
(United Kingdom) Benetton Formula	Benetton-Ford	B187	Ford TEC 1.5 V6 t	19	(Italy) Teo Fabi	All
(United Kingdom) Benetton Formula	Benetton-Ford	B187	Ford TEC 1.5 V6 t	20	(Belgium) Thierry Boutsen	All
(Italy) Landis & Gyr Osella	Osella-Alfa Romeo	FA1I; FA1G	Alfa Romeo 890T 1.5 V8 t	21	(Italy) Alex Caffi	All
(Italy) Landis & Gyr Osella	Osella-Alfa Romeo	FA1I; FA1G	Alfa Romeo 890T 1.5 V8 t	22	(Italy) Gabriele Tarquini	2
(Italy) Landis & Gyr Osella	Osella-Alfa Romeo	FA1I; FA1G	Alfa Romeo 890T 1.5 V8 t	22	(Switzerland) Franco Forini	11–13
(Italy) Minardi Team	Minardi-Motori Moderni	M187	Motori Moderni Tipo 615-90 1.5 V6 t	23	(Spain) Adrián Campos	All
(Italy) Minardi Team	Minardi-Motori Moderni	M187	Motori Moderni Tipo 615-90 1.5 V6 t	24	(Italy) Alessandro Nannini	All
(France) Ligier Loto	Ligier-Megatron	JS29B; JS29C	Megatron M12/13 1.5 L4 t	25	(France) René Arnoux	2–16
(France) Ligier Loto	Ligier-Megatron	JS29B; JS29C	Megatron M12/13 1.5 L4 t	26	(Italy) Piercarlo Ghinzani	2–16
(Italy) Ferrari	Ferrari	F1/87	Ferrari Tipo 033D 1.5 V6 t	27	(Italy) Michele Alboreto	All
(Italy) Ferrari	Ferrari	F1/87	Ferrari Tipo 033D 1.5 V6 t	28	(Austria) Gerhard Berger	All
(France) Larrousse & Calmels	Lola-Ford	LC87	Ford Cosworth DFZ 3.5 V8	29	(France) Yannick Dalmas	14–16
(France) Larrousse & Calmels	Lola-Ford	LC87	Ford Cosworth DFZ 3.5 V8	30	(France) Philippe Alliot	2–16
(Italy) Enzo Coloni Racing Car System	Coloni-Ford	FC187	Ford Cosworth DFZ 3.5 V8	32	(Italy) Nicola Larini	11, 13

=== Team changes ===
- Renault had withdrawn from Formula One at the end of last year, so their three customers had to look for new contracts:
  - Lotus bought one-year-old Honda engines;
  - Ligier were due to run Alfa Romeo four-cylinder turbo engines called the Alfa Romeo 415T (the engine had actually been in development since late 1984 as a possible replacement for the underpowered and thirsty Alfa Romeo 890T V8 turbo), but when driver René Arnoux compared the engines to "used food", Alfa's owner FIAT withdrew from the collaboration. The team were due run with the 890T at the opening round in Brazil before debuting the 4 cylinder turbo at Imola in round 2. However, when the association with Alfa ended it forced the team to miss Brazil while they modified their car to fit the old BMW turbo engines rebadged as Megatron supplied to the team by Arrows team boss Jackie Oliver (BMW limited their factory support to Brabham);
  - Tyrrell signed a contract for Ford-Cosworth V8's, preparing them for the new regulations banning turbos in 1989.
- AGS also made the switch to Cosworth naturally aspirated V8's.
- Benetton, too, signed a deal with Ford-Cosworth, but for their V6 turbo which had debuted in 1986 with the Haas Lola team, because of its specific design features that could hopefully avoid the effects of the limited turbo boost (see Regulation changes), at least more than their rivals' turbo engines.
- McLaren lost designer John Barnard to Ferrari, but gained the services of long time Brabham designer Gordon Murray as the new Technical Director, and former Williams and Haas Lola designer/engineer Neil Oatley. Mclaren's new 1987 car would be designed by Steve Nichols.
- Arrows attracted former Haas Lola aerodynamicist Ross Brawn as its new Technical Director and Chief Designer. With BMW pulling out of Formula One other than honouring the contract to supply engines to the Brabham team in 1987, Arrows major sponsor, American insurance firm USF&G, bought the remaining supply of the BMW M12/13 4-cylinder engines and re-named them as the Megatron M12/13 engines. Team boss Jackie Oliver then supplied some of the engines to the Ligier team from round 2 of the season.

==== Mid-season changes ====
- The FIA's ban on turbocharged engines in 1989 made the entry to Formula One technologically easier and cheaper. The first team attracted to the grid was Scuderia Coloni, a successful squad in the Italian Formula Three Championship. They entered the Italian and Spanish Grand Prix, before participating in the full season a year later.

=== Driver changes ===
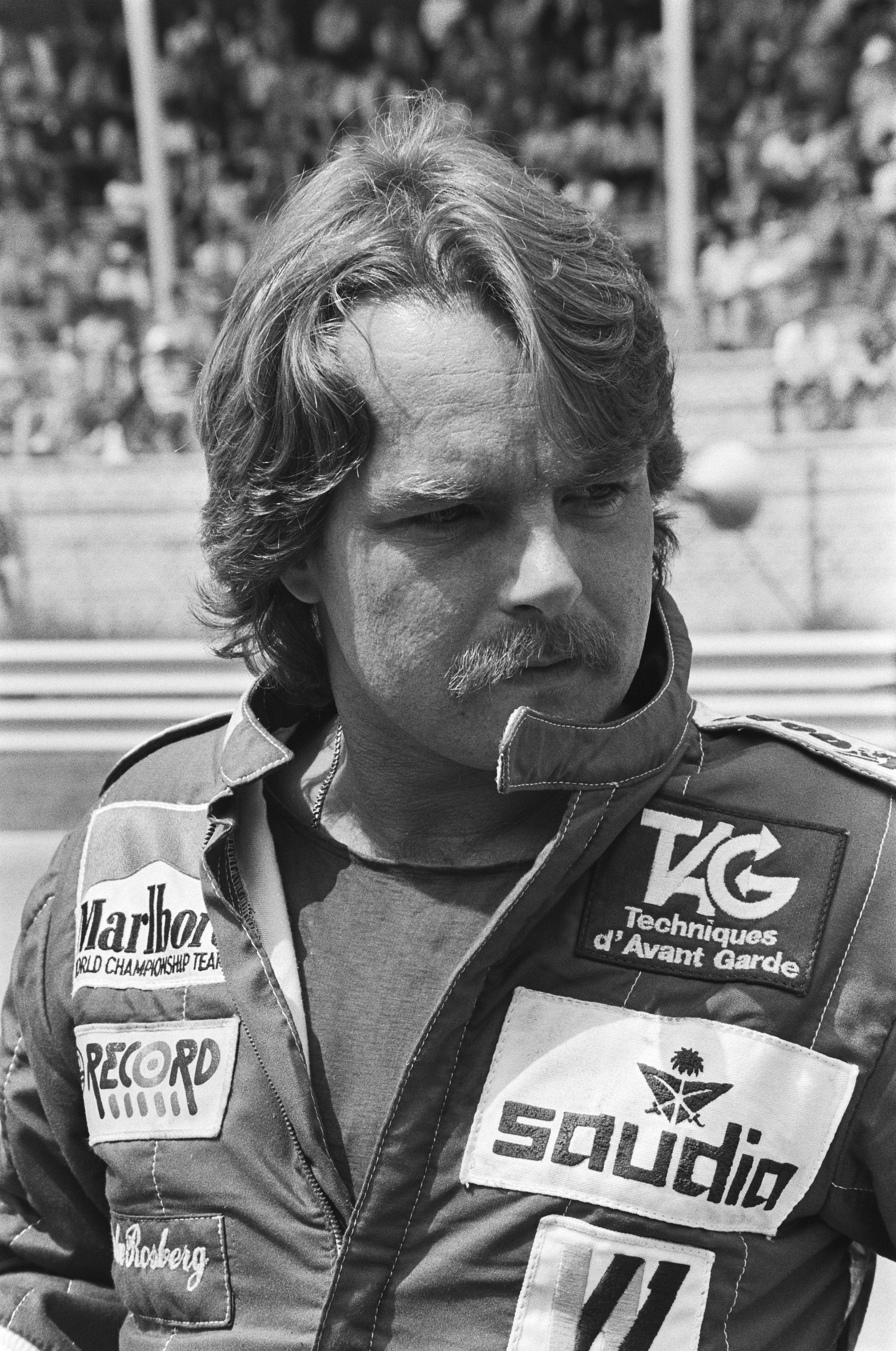
1982 World Champion Keke Rosberg retired before this season.

- Keke Rosberg retired from Formula One, opening the door at McLaren for Stefan Johansson, after he got replaced at Ferrari by Gerhard Berger.
- Satoru Nakajima made his debut at Lotus, next to Ayrton Senna, having won six out of seven championships in Japanese Formula Two. His promotion was backed by Honda.
- Martin Brundle and Jonathan Palmer switched teams, Brundle moving to Zakspeed and Palmer to Tyrrell. Palmer endured a more successful year, winning the Jim Clark Trophy as highest-scoring driver with a non-turbocharged car.
- Another sixteen driver changes happened in the lower-ranking teams.

==== Mid-season changes ====
- By 1987, Osella were going at the season race by race and asking drivers to bring sponsorship or their own money. In such a construction, Gabriele Tarquini made his debut during the San Marino Grand Prix. And likewise, Franco Forini drove three races for the team.
- 1986 Italian F3 champion Nicola Larini debuted with Scuderia Coloni. He had driven for the team in F3.
- F3000 driver Yannick Dalmas made his debut during the Mexican Grand Prix, and staying until the end of the season, driving a second Larrousse car next to Philippe Alliot.
- Due to poor results, AGS replaced Pascal Fabre with Roberto Moreno, with two races left in the year. Moreno had one previous experience in F1, as test driver for Lotus in 1982.
- Brabham driver Riccardo Patrese was given the opportunity to replace Nigel Mansell for the last race of the season, when the Williams driver was injured during qualifying for the Japanese Grand Prix. He had already been signed by Williams for 1988. 1987 F3000 champion Stefano Modena stepped in to make his debut at Brabham.

== Calendar ==
Round	Grand Prix	Circuit	Date
1	Brazilian Grand Prix	(Brazil) Autodromo Jacarepaguá, Rio de Janeiro	12 April
2	San Marino Grand Prix	(Italy) Autodromo Dino Ferrari, Imola	3 May
3	Belgian Grand Prix	(Belgium) Circuit de Spa-Francorchamps, Stavelot	17 May
4	Monaco Grand Prix	Circuit de Monaco, Monte Carlo	31 May
5	Detroit Grand Prix	(United States) Detroit Street Circuit, Detroit, Michigan	21 June
6	French Grand Prix	(France) Paul Ricard Circuit, Le Castellet	5 July
7	British Grand Prix	(United Kingdom) Silverstone Circuit, Silverstone	12 July
8	German Grand Prix	(West Germany) Hockenheimring, Hockenheim	26 July
9	Hungarian Grand Prix	(Hungary) Hungaroring, Mogyoród	9 August
10	Austrian Grand Prix	(Austria) Österreichring, Spielberg	16 August
11	Italian Grand Prix	(Italy) Autodromo Nazionale di Monza, Monza	6 September
12	Portuguese Grand Prix	(Portugal) Autódromo do Estoril, Estoril	20 September
13	Spanish Grand Prix	(Spain) Circuito de Jerez, Jerez de la Frontera	27 September
14	Mexican Grand Prix	Autódromo Hermanos Rodríguez, Mexico City	18 October
15	Japanese Grand Prix	(Japan) Suzuka International Racing Course, Suzuka	1 November
16	Australian Grand Prix	(Australia) Adelaide Street Circuit, Adelaide	15 November

=== Calendar changes ===
- The Belgian Grand Prix and Monaco Grand Prix swapped places on the calendar so that the Monaco round follows the Belgian Grand Prix.
- The British Grand Prix was moved to the Silverstone Circuit on an annual yearly basis after they signed a five-year deal to host the Grand Prix.
- The German Grand Prix reverted to Hockenheim run by the Automobilclub von Deutschland forcing out the Nürburgring who were run by ADAC.
- The Spanish Grand Prix was moved from mid April to late September.
- The Japanese Grand Prix returned after a 10-year absence; it was hosted at the Honda owned Suzuka International Racing Course on 1 November.
- The Canadian Grand Prix was originally scheduled to be held on 14 June but was cancelled due to a dispute between two rival breweries, Labatt and Molson in sponsoring the race. 1987 was the first season since 1975 that there was no Canadian Grand Prix.

== Regulation changes ==
It had already been determined that turbocharged engines would be banned from 1989 on. The FIA tried to make an early switch to naturally aspirated engines appealing:

- Naturally aspirated engines could now have a maximum displacement of 3.5 litres, up from 3.0.
- The fuel limit for turbo engines was set at 195 L (52 US gal), while teams running with a naturally aspirated engine could carry and use unlimited amounts of fuel during a race.
- The turbo boost was now limited at 4.0 bar (58 psi). The FIA handled this by mandating that the valves would "pop off" when the pressure went over the limit. This led to the turbo-powered cars producing approximately 300 bhp (220 kW) less than the year before. However, the rate of development in areas like aerodynamics and tyres was such that the leading turbo-running teams practically negated the restriction on power.

The FIA banned super-soft (and sticky) qualifying tyres to eliminate the unpopular practice of having to find a clear lap on tyres which were good for two flying laps at best.

== Season report ==
=== Race 1: Brazil ===
The first race in April at the fast, rough and abrasive Jacarepagua Riocentro Autodrome in Rio de Janeiro, Brazil resulted in a dominant showing from Williams-Honda with Mansell ahead of Piquet. Then came Senna, Fabi, Prost, Boutsen, Berger, Warwick, Alboreto and Johansson.

The March team suffered a setback on race morning when it ran out of engines, and so the field was down to 22. At the start, Piquet took the lead from the fast-starting Senna while Mansell made a bad start and had to fight his way back to third. On lap seven Piquet suddenly went into the pits, his car having picked up paper in its radiators. He rejoined back in 11th position, leaving Senna to lead Mansell although the British driver was soon in the pits as well to have his radiators cleared. He rejoined behind Piquet and the pair then began to climb through the field. Senna pitted because of handling trouble and so Prost went into the lead and when he stopped for new tyres Boutsen briefly led before Piquet went back into the lead before his second stop. Prost then went ahead again and led for the rest of the afternoon, never looking threatened as he did not have a third tire stop while his rivals Senna and Piquet did. Mansell's race was disrupted by a puncture while Senna went out with engine failure and so Prost came home to win ahead of Piquet, Johansson, Berger, Boutsen and Mansell.

=== Race 2: San Marino (Imola, Italy) ===
After the season-opening race in Brazil there was a three-week gap during which March finished building the first 871 chassis for Capelli. Osella expanded to two cars with the second being run by a youngster called Gabriele Tarquini, while Brundle had the first of Zakspeed's new 871 chassis. Ligier was back in action with Megatron-engined cars for Rene Arnoux and Piercarlo Ghinzani. In addition there was another new team in the form of Gerard Larrousse's Lola-Ford/Cosworth team which had employed Philippe Alliot.

But come the San Marino Grand Prix held at the fast Autodromo Dino Ferrari in Italy, Nelson Piquet had a huge accident at the flat out Tamburello corner when he suffered a tire failure during qualifying and was forbidden from racing by F1 doctor Sid Watkins. Goodyear decided that in the interests of safety it would fly in new tyres overnight for Saturday qualifying. On Saturday afternoon Ayrton Senna took pole position in his Lotus-Honda with Nigel Mansell second quickest in his Williams-Honda. The second row featured Teo Fabi (Benetton-Ford) and Alain Prost (McLaren-TAG) with the Ferraris of Michele Alboreto and Gerhard Berger together on the third row. The top 10 was completed by Stefan Johansson (McLaren), Riccardo Patrese (Brabham-BMW) and the two Arrows-Megatrons of Derek Warwick and Eddie Cheever. Senna led from the start but on the second lap at Tosa, Mansell swept into the lead and began to pull away. On Lap 6 Prost found a way ahead of Senna and then clawed his way up behind Mansell and stayed there. Prost's race ended, however, on Lap 15 when the McLaren suffered an alternator failure. By then Alboreto had got ahead of Senna and so was in second place with Senna third and Patrese fourth. Mansell stopped earlier than planned for new tyres but was still ahead when everyone reemerged from their first stops. Patrese had moved to second with Alboreto and Senna chasing. In the closing laps Patrese dropped back because he had used too much fuel and so Alboreto was second until he lost boost pressure and Senna went ahead again. Mansell took the flag just under half a minute ahead of Senna with Alboreto third. Johansson was fourth, Martin Brundle fifth (scoring Zakspeed's first points) and Satoru Nakajima picking up sixth in his Lotus-Honda.

=== Race 3: Belgium ===
The high-speed circuit tour kept coming, and next was the Belgian Grand Prix at the magnificent and fast Spa-Francorchamps public road circuit near Liege. The field was much as it had been at the San Marino GP a fortnight earlier, although Osella was back to one car again. Nelson Piquet was back in action after his huge crash at Imola while Zakspeed had two 871 chassis for Martin Brundle and Christian Danner, the German having used an older car in the two previous races. Qualifying saw the two Williams-Hondas at the front with Mansell on pole by nearly 1.5 seconds while Ayrton Senna was third in his Lotus-Honda ahead of the two Ferraris of Gerhard Berger and Michele Alboreto, Alain Prost's McLaren-TAG/Porsche, Thierry Boutsen's Benetton-Ford/Cosworth, Riccardo Patrese's Brabham-BMW, Teo Fabi's Benetton and Stefan Johansson in the second McLaren. At the start Mansell took the lead and led Senna, Piquet, Alboreto and Prost. At the start of the second lap Philippe Streiff lost control of his Tyrrell at Raidillon and smashed into the barriers, the impact tearing the engine from the car. Jonathan Palmer then arrived on the scene in the second Tyrrell and smashed into the wreck of Streiff's car. The race was stopped but both men were unhurt, although the Tyrrell team's cars were demolished. The race was restarted which was good luck for Berger and home favorite Boutsen who had collided at the Bus Stop chicane. This time Senna took the lead from Mansell although halfway around the first lap Nigel tried to overtake and the two cars collided and both spun. Senna was out but Mansell was able to get going again. This put Piquet into the lead and Mansell at the back. He would continue until damage from the incident caused him to stop on lap 17, and after he retired, he marched to the Lotus pits to confront Senna, resulting Mansell grabbing Senna by the throat and then the two drivers got into a fist fight. Both had to be separated Second place belonged to Alboreto with Prost third, Boutsen fourth and Fabi fifth after Berger went out with an engine failure. Piquet went out with an engine failure after 10 laps and with Alboreto stopping with a broken CV joint, Prost went into the lead with Boutsen second and Johansson third, the Swede having overtaken Fabi. Stefan then closed on Boutsen and moved to second on lap 17. The pits stops changed little but in the latter part of the race Boutsen fell behind a charged-up Andrea de Cesaris (Brabham-BMW). Boutsen finally retired with a broken CV joint which left fourth place to Eddie Cheever (Arrows-Megatron) with Satoru Nakajima's Lotus-Honda and Rene Arnoux sixth in the Ligier-Megatron.

=== Race 4: Monaco ===
There were no changes in the entry after the Belgian GP and so it was business as usual at Monaco where the three leading Honda-engined cars were at the front as usual with Nigel Mansell taking pole in his Williams, Ayrton Senna second in the Lotus and Nelson Piquet third in the second Williams. Alain Prost was fourth for the McLaren-TAG team with Michele Alboreto fifth in his Ferrari. Sixth place was a surprise in the form of Eddie Cheever's Arrows-Megatron while the top 10 was completed by Stefan Johansson (McLaren-TAG), Gerhard Berger (Ferrari), Thierry Boutsen (Benetton-Ford) and Riccardo Patrese (Brabham-BMW). Alboreto had a spectacular crash when he ran into the back of Christian Danner's Zakspeed on the climb after Ste Devote. The Ferrari flew through the air but landed back on the track. With 26 cars starting at Monaco for the first time there were worries about safety in the race. At the start Mansell went straight into the lead so there was no chance of a repetition of his collision with Senna at Spa. The Brazilian was second with Piquet third ahead of Alboreto, Prost and Cheever. The order at the front remained unchanged until Lap 30 when Mansell slowed with a loss of boost pressure. Senna went into the lead and stayed there all the way to the flag, despite stopping for tyres. Piquet stayed second while Prost moved to third, overhauling Cheever who ran third for much of the mid-race. In the closing laps Prost suffered an engine failure and so third place went to Alboreto with Berger fourth (after Cheever went out with engine failure), Jonathan Palmer fifth in his Tyrrell and Ivan Capelli sixth in the Leyton House March.

=== Race 5: Detroit (USA) ===
The Canadian Grand Prix had been cancelled due to a dispute over local sponsors Molson and Labatt's; so Detroit was the only North American round in the middle of the European season. This race, on the slowest circuit of the season was generally considered to be the toughest and most demanding race of the season, due to the tight and extremely bumpy downtown Detroit city streets lined with concrete walls. The entry was unchanged from the field that had raced at Monaco three weeks earlier and as usual the battle for pole position was between the Honda-powered cars with Nigel Mansell fastest on this occasion with his Williams. Just behind him was Ayrton Senna's Lotus and Nelson Piquet's Williams. There was then a big gap back to Thierry Boutsen's Benetton-Ford, Alain Prost's McLaren-TAG, Eddie Cheever's Arrows-Megatron and Michele Alboreto's Ferrari. The top 10 was completed by Teo Fabi (Benetton), Riccardo Patrese (Brabham-BMW) and Derek Warwick in the second Arrows. Mansell took the lead at the start and began to pull away from Senna while behind in the midfield Stefan Johansson (McLaren) damaged a front wing on the back of Warwick's Arrows and Satoru Nakajima (Lotus-Honda) crashed into the back of Ivan Capelli's Leyton House March and then managed to collide with Adrian Campos's Minardi at the next corner. Behind the two front-runners Piquet had trouble keeping Cheever behind him and eventually gave himself a puncture when he tapped a wheel and had to pit for new tyres. Cheever then had to fight to hold off Fabi and on lap seven the Benetton driver tried to pass and made a mess of it and ended up removing the nose of his car. Both drivers pitted, Fabi to retire and Cheever for new tyres. He rejoined at the back. This left Alboreto third ahead of Boutsen and Prost and the only change in the next few laps was as Prost moved up ahead of the Benetton. Alboreto went out with gearbox failure and so Prost was third as the pit stops approached. During the stops Mansell had a wheel nut stick on his car and lost 10 seconds and that meant that Senna went into the lead with Mansell second, Prost third and Piquet, who had charged up through the field in fourth. Nelson continued his charge and overtook Prost and closed on Mansell, who was suffering from leg cramps. He eventually fell behind the Brazilian, Prost and Gerhard Berger (Ferrari). Senna won at his ease with Piquet second and Prost third. The remaining points went to Berger, Mansell and the recovering Cheever.

=== Race 6: France ===
At the French Grand Prix held at the Paul Ricard circuit near the French Riviera city of Le Castellet, the battle of the Honda powered cars was interrupted in France by a good performance from Alain Prost's McLaren-TAG which qualified second to Nigel Mansell's Williams. The second row featured Ayrton Senna's Lotus-Honda and Nelson Piquet in the second Williams while fifth place went to Thierry Boutsen (Benetton) with Gerhard Berger (Ferrari), Teo Fabi (Benetton) and Michele Alboreto (Ferrari) following the first four rows. The top 10 was completed by Stefan Johansson's McLaren and Derek Warwick in the Arrows-Megatron. Mansell made a good start to lead Prost into the first corner but on the back straight Piquet blasted ahead of the McLaren to make it a Williams 1–2 with Prost third and Senna fourth ahead of the two Benettons, Boutsen ahead of Fabi. This order did not change although Mansell ran into trouble when he ran over debris from Johansson who had had an accident with Andrea de Cesaris (Brabham) at the first corner. On lap 19 Piquet had a moment and lost second place to Prost but during the pits stops the Brazilian managed to get ahead of both Prost and Mansell. Mansell quickly retook second from Prost and closed up on Piquet but overtaking was another issue until Piquet made a mistake and ran wide on lap 46 and Mansell went ahead. At the second round of stops Piquet stalled in the pitlane and lost just under 10 secs and so Mansell was able to win. Nelson finished second while Prost and Senna were third and fourth ahead of Fabi with the final point going to Philippe Streiff in the Tyrrell-Ford/Cosworth.

=== Race 7: Britain ===
The Mansell-Piquet intra-team battle continued at the British Grand Prix at Silverstone with victory in qualifying going to Nelson Piquet who beat his Williams teammate Nigel Mansell to pole by less than a tenth of a second. Third was Ayrton Senna in his Lotus while Alain Prost was fourth fastest in his McLaren-TAG. The third row of the grid was shared by the two Benetton-Fords of Thierry Boutsen and Teo Fabi while row four was an all-Ferrari affair with Michele Alboreto just ahead of Gerhard Berger. The top 10 was completed by Andrea de Cesaris's Brabham-BMW and the second McLaren driven by Stefan Johansson. There was disappointment for Ligier with Piercarlo Ghinzani being excluded from the meeting after he ran out of fuel on the circuit and was then refueled and push-started by his mechanics. The Italian also did a couple of extra laps at the end of the first qualifying and the catalogue of rule-breaking proved to be too much for the stewards to accept. The Silverstone circuit, which was originally the fastest circuit on the calendar had been modified: the Woodcote chicane had been taken out and replaced with a slower chicane further down the Bridge straight. In what was to be a classic race Prost made a better start than both Williams drivers and took the lead but at the second corner Piquet blasted ahead of the Frenchman and almost immediately Mansell followed Piquet through. It was going to be a straight fight between the two of them. The pace of the Williams drivers and the superiority of the Williams FW11B on high-speed tracks meant that Mansell and Piquet lapped the entire field near the end of the race. Piquet had led for most of the afternoon but in the closing laps, with the home crowd roaring him on and having pitted for a fresh set of tires (Piquet had decided to go the entire distance on one set), Mansell closed up on Piquet and at Stowe Corner on lap 63 of 65 Mansell went ahead of his rival with a stunning passing maneuver. The pace of the two Williams cars was so furious that they lapped the entire field on a dry circuit. On the slowing down lap Mansell ran out of fuel, and the Honda engine in his car blew up. Third place went to Senna with fourth going to Satoru Nakajima in the second Lotus-Honda and the remaining points going to Derek Warwick (Arrows-Megatron/BMW) and Fabi.

=== Race 8: Germany ===
Going into the German Grand Prix at the very fast Hockenheimring with its forested straights, the World Championship was finely balanced at the midseason with Ayrton Senna leading with 31 points, Nelson Piquet and Nigel Mansell tied for second at 30, and Alain Prost fourth with 26. Qualifying resulted in Mansell beating Senna to pole with Prost third, edging Piquet to fourth. Michele Alboreto was fifth fastest in his Ferrari with Thierry Boutsen sixth for Benetton. The top 10 was completed by Andrea de Cesaris (Brabham-BMW), Stefan Johansson (McLaren), Teo Fabi (Benetton) and Gerhard Berger (Ferrari). At the start Senna took the lead with Mansell slow away but he recovered to be second by the end of the first lap ahead of Prost, Piquet, Boutsen, Alboreto and Johansson. At the start of the second lap Mansell went ahead and it was clear that Senna was slower than the other leaders. Prost went by later on the second lap and Piquet followed on the third lap. Prost was able to close up to Mansell and on lap seven the Frenchman went ahead. Further back in the field the attrition rate was high but at the front little changed until lap 19 when Prost pitted for tires. When Mansell pitted on lap 23 Prost went ahead again. Mansell hoped to catch the McLaren but his engine failed on lap 25 and so Piquet moved to second place while Senna pitted twice trying to solve a serious handling problem and dropped back, leaving Johansson in third place after Boutsen's Benetton had blown its engine. Prost seemed to have the race won but with four laps to go an alternator belt broke and he was forced to retire. Victory thus went to Piquet with Johansson second, Senna third and stragglers picking up the other points: Philippe Streiff and Jonathan Palmer coming home fourth and fifth in their Tyrrells and Philippe Alliot sixth in his Larrousse Lola. The only other man running was Martin Brundle in his Zakspeed 10 laps behind the winner. The attrition rate was in fact so high in this race that only 6 of 26 starting cars finished – the lowest number since the 1984 Detroit Grand Prix. Most of the failures in this race were engine- or turbo-related; the 1.5L turbo-charged cars were producing around 950 hp in race trim.

=== Race 9: Hungary ===
The big news at the Hungarian Grand Prix at the Hungaroring in Mogyoród was that Ayrton Senna had informed Lotus that he would not be staying with the team in 1988. Team boss Peter Warr moved quickly and signed Nelson Piquet, who was unhappy that Frank Williams would not give him clear number one status at Williams. Senna was going to join Alain Prost at McLaren. Qualifying for the race at Hungaroring saw Ferrari making a step forward as Gerhard Berger qualified second behind Nigel Mansell's Williams-Honda. Nelson Piquet was third with Alain Prost fourth in his McLaren while Michele Alboreto was fifth in the second Ferrari and Senna sixth. The top ten was completed by Thierry Boutsen (Benetton-Ford), Stefan Johansson's McLaren, Derek Warwick in the Arrows-Megatron/BMW and Riccardo Patrese's Brabham-BMW. Mansell took the lead at the start with Berger making a slightly hesitant start which allowed Piquet to take second before Berger retook the place with a brave outside overtaking maneuver at the first corner. Piquet then lost third place to Alboreto and so it was Mansell being chased by the two Ferraris, with Piquet fourth ahead of Senna, Prost, Boutsen and Johansson. Berger's race would be short-lived as he retired after 13 laps with differential failure. This moved Alboreto to second and Piquet to third and the order stayed the same until Piquet overtook Alboreto on lap 29. Senna was fourth with Boutsen fifth and Prost sixth. The order remained unchanged until lap 44 when Alboreto disappeared with an engine problem and then in the closing laps Prost moved ahead of Boutsen. On lap 71 of 76 Mansell's car lost its right rear wheel nut and he was forced to retire, and victory went to Piquet- this was a major blow to Mansell's championship hopes. Senna was second with Prost third ahead of Boutsen, Patrese and Warwick.

=== Race 10: Austria ===
Nelson Piquet's win in Hungary gave him a seven-point lead in the World Championship over Ayrton Senna with Nigel Mansell and Alain Prost 11 points behind Senna. At the Austrian Grand Prix, held at the scenic and spectacular Österreichring, the fastest Grand Prix circuit of the year Nigel Mansell was handicapped slightly by the fact that he had had a wisdom tooth removed before practice began and this affected his performance in qualifying, allowing his Williams-Honda teammate Nelson Piquet to take pole position at an incredible average speed of 159 mph (255 km/h). Mansell was second with Gerhard Berger third in his Ferrari and Thierry Boutsen fourth in his Benetton-Ford, just ahead of his teammate Teo Fabi. Michele Alboreto was sixth in the second Ferrari ahead of Ayrton Senna's Lotus-Honda, Riccardo Patrese's Brabham-BMW, Alain Prost's McLaren and Andrea de Cesaris in the second Brabham. Stefan Johansson had a big fright in practice when he found a deer in the middle of the road and hit it at high speed. This destroyed the McLaren's suspension and he crashed heavily, cracking a rib in the ensuing accident.

The safety of the Austrian track was becoming more of an issue and on race day the problems were underlined again. The narrow pit straight – which had caused problems at Grands Prix for years and one that the organizers had failed to widen – became the center topic of the debate of safety. At the start Piquet got away ahead of a fast-starting Fabi but the race was stopped when Martin Brundle's Zakspeed went out of control, hit a barrier and bounced back into the middle for the track. Rene Arnoux (Ligier) and Adrian Campos (Minardi) collided while the two Tyrrells hit one another and Piercarlo Ghinzani's Ligier was also out with a broken suspension.

The grid was reformed and the field tried to get away again. Piquet went into the lead but Mansell had a problem and was crawling away slowly. Berger too slowed suddenly as he tried to pass the Williams and so there was serious congestion behind with the result that Patrese hit Eddie Cheever (Arrows-Megatron). Johansson hit the back of Cheever and Brundle hit the rear of the McLaren. This resulted in Ghinzani braking and being hit by Alex Caffi's Osella and Ivan Capelli (March), Philippe Alliot (Larrousse Lola), Christian Danner (Zakspeed) and Philippe Streiff (Tyrrell) all becoming involved and then Pascal Fabre (AGS) driving over the back of Jonathan Palmer's Tyrrell. The track was blocked again and the race red flagged for a second time.

Remarkably most of the field was able to take the third start with only Streiff missing, although Brundle, Caffi, Danner and Fabre all started from the pitlane. Prost's McLaren refused to get away and so he jumped into the spare and joined the queue in the pitlane. At the end of the parade lap Alboreto went into the pits to have his steering wheel fixed and so there were sixth cars starting from pitlane. This time Senna stalled but everyone avoided the Lotus and Piquet took the lead from Boutsen, Berger, Mansell and Fabi. At the tail of the field Senna, Prost and Alboreto were beginning to charge through the backmarkers. Berger disappeared with a turbo failure after only a few laps and Boutsen disappeared on lap 15 with a gear-linkage which had come loose. This left Piquet and Mansell at the front with Fabi third. On lap 21 Mansell took the lead as the two Williams drivers were diving through backmarkers going down the straight leading to the Bosch-Kurve. Once ahead Mansell was able to keep his lead at the pit stops and Fabi remained third so attention turned to the battles further down the field as Alboreto and Senna battling it out. The two collided and Senna had to pit for a new front wing. He dropped out of the points but managed to pick up places when Alboreto retired with an exhaust problem and Prost was slowed with a similar failure. This meant that Boutsen was fourth with Senna fifth and Prost sixth.

This would be the last Austrian Grand Prix for 10 years; the race would return to the same shortened venue in 1997.

=== Race 11: Italy ===
The field was expanded at the Monza Autodrome near Milan by the arrival of the new Coloni team, fielding Nicola Larini. The Osella team expanded to two cars with the Swiss Franco Forini joining Alex Caffi. Honda had announced that it would not be supplying Williams with engines in 1988, despite the fact the Japanese company still had one year to go on its contract. Honda had decided that it wanted to be with McLaren. This led to questions over whether Honda would treat the two Williams drivers fairly in the battle for the World Championship as Nelson Piquet would be a Honda driver in 1988 and Mansell would not. The Honda men said that it made no difference but few believed them. The Williams team had its new active-suspension system ready and Nelson Piquet used it, while Nigel Mansell stayed with a conventional car. Piquet took pole position with Mansell a tenth behind him but Ayrton Senna was beaten to third place by Gerhard Berger's Ferrari. Then came Thierry Boutsen (Benetton-Ford), Alain Prost's McLaren-TAG, Michele Alboreto's Ferrari and Teo Fabi's Benetton. The top 10 was completed by the two Brabhams of Andrea de Cesaris and Riccardo Patrese. At the start of the race Mansell made a good start but then missed a gearchange and so Piquet went into the lead at the first corner with Berger third ahead of Boutsen, Prost and Senna. At the start of the second lap Berger challenged for second place and Mansell closed the door so the two cars collided and Boutsen moved to second place with Berger third and Mansell fourth. The order then remained the same until Mansell was finally able to pass Berger on lap 17. he then overtook Boutsen as well. The mid-race pit stops put Senna into the lead and it looked as though he might be able to go without a pit stop as he had done in Monaco and Detroit. The two Williams-Hondas were second and third with Boutsen behind them. Senna looked fine until lap 43 when he was lapping Piercarlo Ghinzani's Ligier and went off across a sand trap at the Parabolica. By the time he was back on the track Piquet was in the lead. Senna tried to regain the place but his tires would not allow him to challenge and so they finished with Piquet winning the race. Mansell was third with Berger fourth, Boutsen fifth and Stefan Johansson (McLaren) sixth.

=== Race 12: Portugal ===
At the Estoril Autodrome near the Portuguese capital of Lisbon, the Coloni team did not reappear in Portugal but Osella continued to run a second car for Franco Forini. Ferrari's progress throughout the summer months was confirmed with Gerhard Berger taking pole position ahead of Nigel Mansell's Williams-Honda, Alain Prost's McLaren and Nelson Piquet's Williams. Ayrton Senna was fifth in his Lotus-Honda and the top 10 was completed by Michele Alboreto in the second Ferrari, Riccardo Patrese's Brabham, Stefan Johansson's McLaren and the two Benetton-Fords of Thierry Boutsen and Teo Fabi. At the start Mansell took the lead from Berger but behind them Alboreto collided with Piquet. Derek Warwick spun his Arrows to avoid them and then Satoru Nakajima (Lotus) collided with Martin Brundle (Zakspeed) and the rest of the field piled into the wrecks. The result was that Adrian Campos (Minardi), Christian Danner (Zakspeed), Rene Arnoux (Ligier), Philippe Alliot (Larrousse Lola) and Eddie Cheever (Arrows) were also involved. The race was stopped, and at the restart everyone was able to start apart from Danner. Mansell went into the lead again. At the end of the first lap, however, Berger took the lead and with Senna fighting off Piquet for third place the race began to settle down. It took Piquet until the eleventh lap to overtake Senna. Mansell pressured Berger early on but then dropped away as his engine began to misfire and on lap 14 stopped on the circuit. Senna slowed and went into the pits with an electronic problem while Alboreto closed up on Piquet and began to make life difficult for the Brazilian. He eventually got ahead but Piquet soon retaliated. The mid-race pitstops elevated Prost to second place ahead of Piquet and Fabi, while Alboreto disappeared with a transmission failure. The order remained unchanged until the closing laps as Prost gradually closed on Berger and put the Austrian under pressure. On lap 68 of 70 Berger crumbled under the pressure and spun. Prost was in the lead and duly won his 28th victory, to beat Jackie Stewart's long-established record of 27 Grand Prix victories, a record he held until Michael Schumacher surpassed with 52 victories at the 2001 Belgian Grand Prix. A disappointed Berger was second with Piquet third, Fabi fourth, Johansson fifth and Cheever sixth.

=== Race 13: Spain ===
The Spanish Grand Prix had been moved to being the final Grand Prix in Europe of the year, and at the Jerez circuit near Seville in southern Spain, the Coloni team was back in action and with Franco Forini staying on for a third event with the Osella team the field was up to 28 cars. The battle for pole position was between the two Williams-Honda with World Championship leader Nelson Piquet (in an active Williams) on pole ahead of challenger Nigel Mansell (who chose to use the passive car). The two Ferraris of Gerhard Berger and Michele Alboreto were third and fourth with Ayrton Senna fifth in his Lotus-Honda. Teo Fabi was sixth in his Benetton-Ford with Alain Prost (McLaren), Thierry Boutsen (Benetton) and the two Brabhams of Riccardo Patrese and Andrea de Cesaris rounding off the top 10. In the race Piquet took the lead but Mansell dived ahead at the end of the first lap and began to pull away from the Brazilian. Senna was third with the two Ferraris and Boutsen chasing. The top five did not change for the first half of the race with Senna at the front of a train of cars. At the pitstops Mansell was away and gone before Senna arrived but Piquet was slower and found himself stuck in fourth place behind Senna and Prost. He challenged Prost but got it wrong and spun back to sixth place. Senna had decided to go through without a stop and those behind him were left to battle with one another while Mansell drove on to victory. Senna's gamble did not pay off because his tires deteriorated quickly and eventually Piquet, Boutsen and Prost were all able to get ahead. Senna then dropped back behind Johansson as well. Piquet then made a mistake and ran wide but Boutsen also made a mistake and spun and so Prost was second with Johansson third, Piquet fourth, Senna fifth and Philippe Alliot sixth in his Larrousse Lola.

=== Race 14: Mexico ===
The Formula One circus moved from one Hispanophonic country to another; this time to Mexico 3 weeks after the Spanish round. This race, held at the high-altitude and very bumpy Hermanos Rodriguez Autodrome located within a recreational public park in the middle of Mexico City was the 450th Formula One Grand Prix, and the field was much as it had been all season, the only changes being that Osella had gone back to one car and Larrousse has expanded to two with Yannick Dalmas joining Philippe Alliot. Nelson Piquet was 18 points ahead with three races to go and so Nigel Mansell needed a good result without Piquet scoring too well. The atmosphere in the Williams had deteriorated badly between the two drivers to the point where team boss Frank Williams had admitted that he could not do anything to make things better but as Ayrton Senna was out of the running for the World Championship there was no chance that the two could take points from one another as they had in 1986 and let a third driver win the title. In qualifying the drivers found that thanks to the geologically active land the Mexico City track, already made challenging by the humid heat, dust and smog had become more bumpy than last year and there were a series of big accidents, including one of Mansell, and another for Ayrton Senna. The drivers were all complaining intensely about the track surface to FIA personnel, but not much could be done at this point. Mansell was on pole from Gerhard Berger second in his Ferrari ahead of Piquet, Thierry Boutsen (Benetton-Ford), Alain Prost (McLaren), Teo Fabi (Benetton) and Senna. The top 10 was rounded off by Riccardo Patrese (Brabham-BMW), Michele Alboreto (Ferrari) and Andrea de Cesaris (Brabham). This Grand Prix was a very unusual race, and at the start Mansell made a bad start and was overtaken by Berger, Boutsen, Piquet and Prost. At the first corner Piquet and Prost tangled and both cars spun. Prost was out but Piquet got going again with assistance from the track marshals. Mansell had moved up to third, and there were further incidents down through the field with Stefan Johansson being spinning and being eliminated when he was hit by Christian Danner, and Nakajima crashing into the back of Derek Warwick's Arrows at the end of the main straight. At the front Boutsen took the lead from Berger on the second lap with Mansell a distant third but then the Benetton began to misfire and Berger went back into the lead and Boutsen went out with electronic injection trouble. Berger retired six laps later with engine failure and with Alboreto also having disappeared Ferrari's race was over. Mansell was thus left in the lead with Senna second and Patrese third and Piquet fourth. Then there were red flags after Warwick (Arrows-Megatron) had a huge accident at the final corner when something broke at the back of his car as a result of Nakajima running into him earlier. A new grid was formed up based on the order of the cars before the crash with the race being decided on aggregate. Piquet took the lead at the restart but with Mansell sitting behind him there was no way he could win the race. In the closing laps Senna spun off and so Piquet ended up in second place having done enough to beat Patrese on aggregate. Eddie Cheever was fourth in his Arrows with Fabi fifth and Philippe Alliot sixth.

=== Race 15: Japan ===
Formula 1 returned to Japan for the first time in 10 years and the circus came for the first time to the twisty, very demanding Honda-owned Suzuka track near Nagoya having been at the very fast Fuji Speedway in 1977. An exciting World Championship showdown between Williams-Honda teammates Nelson Piquet and Nigel Mansell was on the cards, Piquet was 12 points ahead of Mansell, but already had 11 points results so would not be able to score as easily, meaning two wins for Mansell would give the Brit the title. However, during qualifying Mansell crashed heavily at the fast Snake sweepers behind the paddock. The accident left him with severe bruising to his backbone, re-triggering an old injury and it was decided that he should not be allowed to race. Having spent Friday night in hospital Mansell flew back to Europe on Saturday evening. Nelson Piquet was World Champion for the third time, his season-long consistency having paid dividends. The entry was much as it had been in Mexico although AGS decided to replace Pascal Fabre with Roberto Moreno. Gerhard Berger took pole position in his Ferrari ahead of Alain Prost's McLaren, Thierry Boutsen's Benetton-Ford and Michele Alboreto in the second Ferrari. Then came Piquet and Teo Fabi (Benetton) with the top 10 completed by Ayrton Senna (Lotus), Riccardo Patrese (Brabham-BMW), Stefan Johansson's McLaren and the second Brabham of Andrea de Cesaris. In the race Berger took the lead at the start and was never threatened, winning a dominant victory; this was Ferrari's first victory since the 1985 German Grand Prix. Boutsen chased Berger early on but dropped behind Senna, Piquet and Johansson. Piquet's race ended with an engine failure in the closing laps, so fourth place went to Alboreto with Boutsen fifth and Satoru Nakajima sixth.

=== Race 16: Australia ===
The last race of the year was at the demanding and punishing Adelaide street circuit in Australia. With Nigel Mansell out of action with injury after the Japanese GP, Williams did a deal with Brabham to use 1988 signing Riccardo Patrese for the final race of 1987 and Brabham took on youngster Stefano Modena as Patrese's replacement. Otherwise the field was as before. Japanese GP winner Gerhard Berger was on pole position in his Ferrari from Alain Prost's McLaren-TAG/Porsche, Nelson Piquet's Williams-Honda and the Lotus-Honda of Ayrton Senna. Thierry Boutsen was fifth quickest in his Benetton-Ford ahead of Michele Alboreto's Ferrari, Patrese's Williams, Stefan Johansson's McLaren, Teo Fabi's Benetton and Andrea de Cesaris's Brabham. Berger did as he had done in Japan, leading from flag to flag. He was chased initially by Piquet and Senna but the Lotus soon fell behind Prost. After the midrace pit stops Senna moved to second with Alboreto third. The final World Championship points went to Jonathan Palmer (Tyrrell) in fourth place and Roberto Moreno (AGS) in sixth. Yannick Dalmas (Larrousse Lola) finished fifth, but was not eligible for World Championship points as he was driving Larrousse-Lola's second car and the team had officially entered only one car for the entire championship. Senna was then disqualified for a weight infringement in his last race for Lotus.

== Results and standings ==
=== Grands Prix ===
Round	Grand Prix	Pole position	Fastest lap	Winning driver	Winning constructor	Report
1	(Brazil) Brazilian Grand Prix	(United Kingdom) Nigel Mansell	(Brazil) Nelson Piquet	(France) Alain Prost	(United Kingdom) McLaren-TAG	Report
2	(Italy) San Marino Grand Prix	(Brazil) Ayrton Senna	(Italy) Teo Fabi	(United Kingdom) Nigel Mansell	(United Kingdom) Williams-Honda	Report
3	(Belgium) Belgian Grand Prix	(United Kingdom) Nigel Mansell	(France) Alain Prost	(France) Alain Prost	(United Kingdom) McLaren-TAG	Report
4	Monaco Grand Prix	(United Kingdom) Nigel Mansell	(Brazil) Ayrton Senna	(Brazil) Ayrton Senna	(United Kingdom) Lotus-Honda	Report
5	(United States) Detroit Grand Prix	(United Kingdom) Nigel Mansell	(Brazil) Ayrton Senna	(Brazil) Ayrton Senna	(United Kingdom) Lotus-Honda	Report
6	(France) French Grand Prix	(United Kingdom) Nigel Mansell	(Brazil) Nelson Piquet	(United Kingdom) Nigel Mansell	(United Kingdom) Williams-Honda	Report
7	(United Kingdom) British Grand Prix	(Brazil) Nelson Piquet	(United Kingdom) Nigel Mansell	(United Kingdom) Nigel Mansell	(United Kingdom) Williams-Honda	Report
8	(West Germany) German Grand Prix	(United Kingdom) Nigel Mansell	(United Kingdom) Nigel Mansell	(Brazil) Nelson Piquet	(United Kingdom) Williams-Honda	Report
9	(Hungary) Hungarian Grand Prix	(United Kingdom) Nigel Mansell	(Brazil) Nelson Piquet	(Brazil) Nelson Piquet	(United Kingdom) Williams-Honda	Report
10	(Austria) Austrian Grand Prix	(Brazil) Nelson Piquet	(United Kingdom) Nigel Mansell	(United Kingdom) Nigel Mansell	(United Kingdom) Williams-Honda	Report
11	(Italy) Italian Grand Prix	(Brazil) Nelson Piquet	(Brazil) Ayrton Senna	(Brazil) Nelson Piquet	(United Kingdom) Williams-Honda	Report
12	(Portugal) Portuguese Grand Prix	(Austria) Gerhard Berger	(Austria) Gerhard Berger	(France) Alain Prost	(United Kingdom) McLaren-TAG	Report
13	(Spain) Spanish Grand Prix	(Brazil) Nelson Piquet	(Austria) Gerhard Berger	(United Kingdom) Nigel Mansell	(United Kingdom) Williams-Honda	Report
14	(Mexico) Mexican Grand Prix	(United Kingdom) Nigel Mansell	(Brazil) Nelson Piquet	(United Kingdom) Nigel Mansell	(United Kingdom) Williams-Honda	Report
15	(Japan) Japanese Grand Prix	(Austria) Gerhard Berger	(France) Alain Prost	(Austria) Gerhard Berger	(Italy) Ferrari	Report
16	(Australia) Australian Grand Prix	(Austria) Gerhard Berger	(Austria) Gerhard Berger	(Austria) Gerhard Berger	(Italy) Ferrari	Report

=== Scoring system ===
Points were awarded to the top six classified finishers for the Drivers' and Constructors' Championships, while points for the Jim Clark Trophy and Colin Chapman Trophy were awarded to the top six classified finishers running naturally aspirated engines. For the Drivers' Championship, the best eleven results were counted, while, for the Constructors' Championship, Jim Clark Trophy, and Colin Chapman Trophy, all rounds were counted.

Numbers without parentheses are championship points; numbers in parentheses are total points scored. Points were awarded in the following system:

Position	1st	2nd	3rd	4th	5th	6th
Race	9	6	4	3	2	1

=== World Drivers' Championship standings ===
Pos	Driver	BRA (Brazil)	SMR (Italy)	BEL (Belgium)	MON (Monaco)	DET (United States)	FRA (France)	GBR (United Kingdom)	GER (West Germany)	HUN (Hungary)	AUT (Austria)	ITA (Italy)	POR (Portugal)	ESP (Spain)	MEX (Mexico)	JPN (Japan)	AUS (Australia)	Points
1	(Brazil) Nelson Piquet	2^{F}	DNS	Ret	2	2	2^{F}	2^{P}	1	1^{F}	2^{P}	1^{P}	3	(4)^{P}	2^{F}	15†	Ret	73 (76)
2	(United Kingdom) Nigel Mansell	6^{P}	1	Ret^{P}	Ret^{P}	5^{P}	1^{P}	1^{F}	Ret^{P}^{F}	14†^{P}	1^{F}	3	Ret	1	1^{P}	DNS		61
3	(Brazil) Ayrton Senna	Ret	2^{P}	Ret	1^{F}	1^{F}	4	3	3	2	5	2^{F}	7	5	Ret	2	DSQ	57
4	(France) Alain Prost	1	Ret	1^{F}	9†	3	3	Ret	7†	3	6	15	1	2	Ret	7^{F}	Ret	46
5	(Austria) Gerhard Berger	4	Ret	Ret	4	4	Ret	Ret	Ret	Ret	Ret	4	2^{P}^{F}	Ret^{F}	Ret	1^{P}	1^{P}^{F}	36
6	(Sweden) Stefan Johansson	3	4	2	Ret	7	8	Ret	2	Ret	7	6	5	3	Ret	3	Ret	30
7	(Italy) Michele Alboreto	8†	3	Ret	3	Ret	Ret	Ret	Ret	Ret	Ret	Ret	Ret	15†	Ret	4	2	17
8	(Belgium) Thierry Boutsen	5	Ret	Ret	Ret	Ret	Ret	7	Ret	4	4	5	14	16†	Ret	5	3	16
9	(Italy) Teo Fabi	Ret	Ret^{F}	Ret	8	Ret	5	6	Ret	Ret	3	7	4†	Ret	5	Ret	Ret	12
10	(United States) Eddie Cheever	Ret	Ret	4	Ret	6	Ret	Ret	Ret	8	Ret	Ret	6	8†	4	9†	Ret	8
11	(United Kingdom) Jonathan Palmer	10	Ret	Ret	5	11	7	8	5	7	14	14	10	Ret	7	8	4	7
12	(Japan) Satoru Nakajima	7	6†	5	10	Ret	NC	4	Ret	Ret	13	11	8	9	Ret	6	Ret	7
13	(Italy) Riccardo Patrese	Ret	9	Ret	Ret	9	Ret	Ret	Ret	5	Ret	Ret	Ret	13	3	11	9†	6
14	(Italy) Andrea de Cesaris	Ret	Ret	3†	Ret	Ret	Ret	Ret	Ret	Ret	Ret	Ret	Ret	Ret	Ret	Ret	8†	4
15	(France) Philippe Streiff	11	8	9	Ret	Ret	6	Ret	4	9	Ret	12	12	7	8	12	Ret	4
16	(United Kingdom) Derek Warwick	Ret	11†	Ret	Ret	Ret	Ret	5	Ret	6	Ret	Ret	13	10	Ret	10	Ret	3
17	(France) Philippe Alliot		10	8	Ret	Ret	Ret	Ret	6	Ret	12	Ret	Ret	6	6	Ret	Ret	3
18	(United Kingdom) Martin Brundle	Ret	5	Ret	7	Ret	Ret	NC	NC	Ret	DSQ	Ret	Ret	11	Ret	Ret	Ret	2
19	(Italy) Ivan Capelli	DNS	Ret	Ret	6	Ret	Ret	Ret	Ret	10	11	13	9	12	Ret	Ret	Ret	1
20	(France) René Arnoux		DNS	6	11	10	Ret	Ret	Ret	Ret	10	10	Ret	Ret	Ret	Ret	Ret	1
21	(Brazil) Roberto Moreno															Ret	6	1
—	(France) Yannick Dalmas														9	14	5*	0
—	(West Germany) Christian Danner	9	7	Ret	EX	8	Ret	Ret	Ret	Ret	9	9	Ret	Ret	Ret	Ret	7	0
—	(Italy) Piercarlo Ghinzani		Ret	7†	12	Ret	Ret	EX	Ret	12	8	8	Ret	Ret	Ret	13	Ret	0
—	(France) Pascal Fabre	12	13	10†	13	12	9	9	Ret	13	NC	DNQ	DNQ	Ret	DNQ			0
—	(Italy) Alessandro Nannini	Ret	Ret	Ret	Ret	Ret	Ret	Ret	Ret	11	Ret	16	11†	Ret	Ret	Ret	Ret	0
—	(Italy) Alex Caffi	Ret	12†	Ret	Ret	Ret	Ret	Ret	Ret	Ret	Ret	Ret	Ret	DNQ	Ret	Ret	DNQ	0
—	(Spain) Adrián Campos	DSQ	Ret	Ret	DNS	Ret	Ret	Ret	Ret	Ret	Ret	Ret	Ret	14	Ret	Ret	Ret	0
—	(Switzerland) Franco Forini											Ret	Ret	DNQ				0
—	(Italy) Stefano Modena																Ret	0
—	(Italy) Gabriele Tarquini		Ret															0
—	(Italy) Nicola Larini											DNQ		Ret				0
Pos	Driver	BRA (Brazil)	SMR (Italy)	BEL (Belgium)	MON (Monaco)	DET (United States)	FRA (France)	GBR (United Kingdom)	GER (West Germany)	HUN (Hungary)	AUT (Austria)	ITA (Italy)	POR (Portugal)	ESP (Spain)	MEX (Mexico)	JPN (Japan)	AUS (Australia)	Points

Key
Colour	Result
Gold	Winner
Silver	Second place
Bronze	Third place
Green	Other points position
Blue	Other classified position
Blue	Not classified, finished (NC)
Purple	Not classified, retired (Ret)
Red	Did not qualify (DNQ)
Black	Disqualified (DSQ)
White	Did not start (DNS)
White	Race cancelled (C)
Blank	Did not practice (DNP)
Blank	Excluded (EX)
Blank	Did not arrive (DNA)
Blank	Withdrawn (WD)
Blank	Did not enter (empty cell)
Annotation	Meaning
P	Pole position
F	Fastest lap

^{†} Driver did not finish the Grand Prix, but was classified as he completed over 90% of the race distance.
* Dalmas was not eligible for points, as he was driving Larrousse-Lola's second car and the team had officially entered only one car for the entire championship.

=== Jim Clark Trophy ===
Pos	Driver	BRA (Brazil)	SMR (Italy)	BEL (Belgium)	MON (Monaco)	DET (United States)	FRA (France)	GBR (United Kingdom)	GER (West Germany)	HUN (Hungary)	AUT (Austria)	ITA (Italy)	POR (Portugal)	ESP (Spain)	MEX (Mexico)	JPN (Japan)	AUS (Australia)	Points
1	(United Kingdom) Jonathan Palmer	1	Ret	Ret	1	1	2	1	2	1	3	3	2	Ret	2	1	1	95
2	(France) Philippe Streiff	2	1	2	Ret	Ret	1	Ret	1	2	Ret	1	3	2	3	2	Ret	74
3	(France) Philippe Alliot		2	1	Ret	Ret	Ret	Ret	3	Ret	2	Ret	Ret	1	1	Ret	Ret	43
4	(Italy) Ivan Capelli	DNS	Ret	Ret	2	Ret	Ret	Ret	Ret	3	1	2	1	3	Ret	Ret	Ret	38
5	(France) Pascal Fabre	3	3	3	3	2	3	2	Ret	4	NC	DNQ	DNQ	Ret	DNQ			35
6	(Brazil) Roberto Moreno															Ret	3	4
—	(France) Yannick Dalmas														4*	3*	2*	0
—	(Italy) Nicola Larini											DNQ		Ret				0
Pos	Driver	BRA (Brazil)	SMR (Italy)	BEL (Belgium)	MON (Monaco)	DET (United States)	FRA (France)	GBR (United Kingdom)	GER (West Germany)	HUN (Hungary)	AUT (Austria)	ITA (Italy)	POR (Portugal)	ESP (Spain)	MEX (Mexico)	JPN (Japan)	AUS (Australia)	Points

* Dalmas was ruled to have competed in insufficient events to be eligible for points

=== World Constructors' Championship standings ===
Pos	Constructor	Car no.	BRA (Brazil)	SMR (Italy)	BEL (Belgium)	MON (Monaco)	DET (United States)	FRA (France)	GBR (United Kingdom)	GER (West Germany)	HUN (Hungary)	AUT (Austria)	ITA (Italy)	POR (Portugal)	ESP (Spain)	MEX (Mexico)	JPN (Japan)	AUS (Australia)	Pts
1	(United Kingdom) Williams-Honda	5	6^{P}	1	Ret^{P}	Ret^{P}	5^{P}	1^{P}	1^{F}	Ret^{P}^{F}	14†^{P}	1^{F}	3	Ret	1	1^{P}	DNS	9†	137
1	(United Kingdom) Williams-Honda	6	2^{F}	DNS	Ret	2	2	2^{F}	2^{P}	1	1^{F}	2^{P}	1^{P}	3	4^{P}	2^{F}	15†	Ret	137
2	(United Kingdom) McLaren-TAG	1	1	Ret	1^{F}	9†	3	3	Ret	7†	3	6	14	1	2	Ret	7^{F}	Ret	76
2	(United Kingdom) McLaren-TAG	2	3	4	2	Ret	7	8	Ret	2	Ret	7	6	5	3	Ret	3	Ret	76
3	(United Kingdom) Lotus-Honda	11	7	6†	5	10	Ret	NC	4	Ret	Ret	13	11	8	9	Ret	6	Ret	64
3	(United Kingdom) Lotus-Honda	12	Ret	2^{P}	Ret	1^{F}	1^{F}	4	3	3	2	5	2^{F}	7	5	Ret	2	DSQ	64
4	(Italy) Ferrari	27	8†	3	Ret	3	Ret	Ret	Ret	Ret	Ret	Ret	Ret	Ret	15†	Ret	4	2	53
4	(Italy) Ferrari	28	4	Ret	Ret	4	4	Ret	Ret	Ret	Ret	Ret	4	2^{P}^{F}	Ret^{F}	Ret	1^{P}	1^{P}^{F}	53
5	(United Kingdom) Benetton-Ford	19	Ret	Ret^{F}	Ret	8	Ret	5	6	Ret	Ret	3	7	4†	Ret	5	Ret	Ret	28
5	(United Kingdom) Benetton-Ford	20	5	Ret	Ret	Ret	Ret	Ret	7	Ret	4	4	5	14	16†	Ret	5	3	28
6	(United Kingdom) Tyrrell-Ford	3	10	Ret	Ret	5	11	7	8	5	7	14	14	10	Ret	7	8	4	11
6	(United Kingdom) Tyrrell-Ford	4	11	8	9	Ret	Ret	6	Ret	4	9	Ret	12	12	7	8	12	Ret	11
7	(United Kingdom) Arrows-Megatron	17	Ret	11†	Ret	Ret	Ret	Ret	5	Ret	6	Ret	Ret	13	10	Ret	10	Ret	11
7	(United Kingdom) Arrows-Megatron	18	Ret	Ret	4	Ret	6	Ret	Ret	Ret	8	Ret	Ret	6	8†	4	9†	Ret	11
8	(United Kingdom) Brabham-BMW	7	Ret	9	Ret	Ret	9	Ret	Ret	Ret	5	Ret	Ret	Ret	13	3	11	Ret	10
8	(United Kingdom) Brabham-BMW	8	Ret	Ret	3†	Ret	Ret	Ret	Ret	Ret	Ret	Ret	Ret	Ret	Ret	Ret	Ret	8†	10
9	(United Kingdom) Lola-Ford	29														9	14	5*	3
9	(United Kingdom) Lola-Ford	30		10	8	Ret	Ret	Ret	Ret	6	Ret	12	Ret	Ret	6	6	Ret	Ret	3
10	(West Germany) Zakspeed	9	Ret	5	Ret	7	Ret	Ret	NC	NC	Ret	DSQ	Ret	Ret	11	Ret	Ret	Ret	2
10	(West Germany) Zakspeed	10	9	7	Ret	EX	8	Ret	Ret	Ret	Ret	9	9	DNS	Ret	Ret	Ret	7	2
11	(France) Ligier-Megatron	25		DNS	6	11	10	Ret	Ret	Ret	Ret	10	10	Ret	Ret	Ret	Ret	Ret	1
11	(France) Ligier-Megatron	26		Ret	7†	12	Ret	Ret	EX	Ret	12	8	8	Ret	Ret	Ret	13	Ret	1
12	(France) AGS-Ford	14	12	13	10†	13	12	9	9	Ret	13	NC	DNQ	DNQ	Ret	DNQ	Ret	6	1
13	(United Kingdom) March-Ford	16	DNS	Ret	Ret	6	Ret	Ret	Ret	Ret	10	11	13	9	12	Ret	Ret	Ret	1
—	(Italy) Minardi-Motori Moderni	23	DSQ	Ret	Ret	DNS	Ret	Ret	Ret	Ret	Ret	Ret	Ret	Ret	14	Ret	Ret	Ret	0
—	(Italy) Minardi-Motori Moderni	24	Ret	Ret	Ret	Ret	Ret	Ret	Ret	Ret	11	Ret	16	11†	Ret	Ret	Ret	Ret	0
—	(Italy) Osella-Alfa Romeo	21	Ret	12†	Ret	Ret	Ret	Ret	Ret	Ret	Ret	Ret	Ret	Ret	DNQ	Ret	Ret	DNQ	0
—	(Italy) Osella-Alfa Romeo	22		Ret									Ret	Ret	DNQ				0
—	(Italy) Coloni-Ford	32											DNQ		Ret				0
Pos	Constructor	Car no.	BRA (Brazil)	SMR (Italy)	BEL (Belgium)	MON (Monaco)	DET (United States)	FRA (France)	GBR (United Kingdom)	GER (West Germany)	HUN (Hungary)	AUT (Austria)	ITA (Italy)	POR (Portugal)	ESP (Spain)	MEX (Mexico)	JPN (Japan)	AUS (Australia)	Pts

Key
Colour	Result
Gold	Winner
Silver	Second place
Bronze	Third place
Green	Other points position
Blue	Other classified position
Blue	Not classified, finished (NC)
Purple	Not classified, retired (Ret)
Red	Did not qualify (DNQ)
Black	Disqualified (DSQ)
White	Did not start (DNS)
White	Race cancelled (C)
Blank	Did not practice (DNP)
Blank	Excluded (EX)
Blank	Did not arrive (DNA)
Blank	Withdrawn (WD)
Blank	Did not enter (empty cell)
Annotation	Meaning
P	Pole position
F	Fastest lap

* The second Lola was not eligible for points, as the team had officially entered only one car for the entire championship.

=== Colin Chapman Trophy ===
Pos	Constructor	Car no.	BRA (Brazil)	SMR (Italy)	BEL (Belgium)	MON (Monaco)	DET (United States)	FRA (France)	GBR (United Kingdom)	GER (West Germany)	HUN (Hungary)	AUT (Austria)	ITA (Italy)	POR (Portugal)	ESP (Spain)	MEX (Mexico)	JPN (Japan)	AUS (Australia)	Pts
1	(United Kingdom) Tyrrell-Ford	3	1	Ret	Ret	1	1	2	1	2	1	3	3	2	Ret	2	1	1	169
1	(United Kingdom) Tyrrell-Ford	4	2	1	2	Ret	Ret	1	Ret	1	2	Ret	1	3	2	3	2	Ret	169
2	(France) Lola-Ford	29														4*	3*	2*	43
2	(France) Lola-Ford	30		2	1	Ret	Ret	Ret	Ret	3	Ret	2	Ret	Ret	1	1	Ret	Ret	43
3	(France) AGS-Ford	14	3	3	3	3	2	3	2	Ret	4	NC	DNQ	DNQ	Ret	DNQ	Ret	3	39
4	(United Kingdom) March-Ford	16	DNS	Ret	Ret	2	Ret	Ret	Ret	Ret	3	1	2	1	3	Ret	Ret	Ret	38
—	(Italy) Coloni-Ford	32											DNQ		Ret				0
Pos	Constructor	Car no.	BRA (Brazil)	SMR (Italy)	BEL (Belgium)	MON (Monaco)	DET (United States)	FRA (France)	GBR (United Kingdom)	GER (West Germany)	HUN (Hungary)	AUT (Austria)	ITA (Italy)	POR (Portugal)	ESP (Spain)	MEX (Mexico)	JPN (Japan)	AUS (Australia)	Pts

* The second Lola was not eligible for points (see above).
