= 1987 Monaco Grand Prix =

Coordinates: 43°44′4.74″N 7°25′16.8″E

- Race 4 of 16 in the 1987 Formula One World Championship
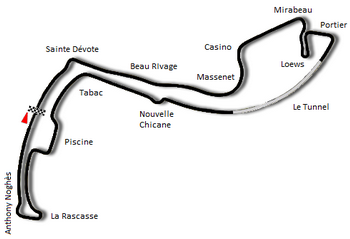

Race details
- Date: 31 May 1987
- Official name: 45e Grand Prix de Monaco
- Location: Circuit de Monaco; Monte Carlo, Monaco
- Course: Street circuit
- Course length: 3.328 km (2.068 miles)
- Distance: 78 laps, 259.584 km (161.298 miles)
- Weather: Sunny and warm

Pole position
Driver	(United Kingdom) Nigel Mansell	Williams-Honda
- Time: 1:23.039

Fastest lap
Driver	(Brazil) Ayrton Senna	Lotus-Honda
- Time: 1:27.685 on lap 72

Podium
First	(Brazil) Ayrton Senna	Lotus-Honda
Second	(Brazil) Nelson Piquet	Williams-Honda
Third	(Italy) Michele Alboreto	Ferrari

The 1987 Monaco Grand Prix (formally the 45e Grand Prix de Monaco) was a Formula One motor race held on 31 May 1987 at the Circuit de Monaco, Monte Carlo. It was the fourth race of the 1987 Formula One World Championship.

The 78-lap race was won by Ayrton Senna, driving a Lotus-Honda. It was the first of an eventual six wins for the Brazilian driver at Monaco. Compatriot Nelson Piquet was second in a Williams-Honda, with Italian Michele Alboreto third in a Ferrari.

The win promoted Senna to second in the Drivers' Championship, three points behind McLaren driver Alain Prost.

== Race summary ==
Traditionally the number of competitors permitted for the Monaco Grand Prix was lower than at all other races, due to the short, tight and twisty nature of the Monte Carlo circuit. Originally 16, it was later increased to 20. For 1987, however, it was increased to a full grid of 26. According to FISA, this move was made in order to bring the race into line with the other races on the F1 calendar, but there were cynical views that it was made in order to reduce the number of non-qualifiers to appease team sponsors. There was widespread concern about the results of overcrowding on the track and the speed difference of various cars.

During the practice session, Michele Alboreto's Ferrari tangled with Christian Danner's slow-moving Zakspeed on the uphill section after the Ste-Devote corner. Alboreto's car was thrown in the air and caught fire, but landed back on the track. FISA blamed Danner for the accident and decided to exclude him from the weekend, the first such event in the history of the Formula One World Championship. There were widespread objections throughout the paddock, particularly as there were several other practice accidents and it was felt that Danner had no more to blame than any other driver involved in these accidents. Alboreto himself believed that Danner was not to blame for the accident.

Nigel Mansell took pole position in the Williams, with Ayrton Senna's Lotus alongside on the front row and Nelson Piquet third in the other Williams. At the start, Mansell led away from Senna, Piquet, Alboreto and Alain Prost in the McLaren. Mansell led until lap 30 when he retired with a loss of turbo boost; Senna then led for the remainder of the race; despite making a pit stop for tyres.

Senna eventually won by 33 seconds from Piquet. Prost was running third when his engine failed with three laps to go, promoting Alboreto to the final podium position. Gerhard Berger finished fourth in the other Ferrari, with the top six completed by the first two naturally-aspirated finishers, Jonathan Palmer in the Tyrrell and Ivan Capelli in the March.

Senna's victory was the first for a car with active suspension, with the Brazilian driver stating that "she was so excellent that, if she could, she would do and win another two-hour race in Monaco right after".

== Classification ==
=== Qualifying ===
Pos	No	Driver	Constructor	Q1	Q2	Gap	Grid
1	5	(United Kingdom) Nigel Mansell	Williams-Honda	1:24.514	1:23.039	—	1
2	12	(Brazil) Ayrton Senna	Lotus-Honda	1:25.255	1:23.711	+0.672	2
3	6	(Brazil) Nelson Piquet	Williams-Honda	1:25.917	1:24.755	+1.716	3
4	1	(France) Alain Prost	McLaren-TAG	1:25.574	1:25.083	+2.044	4
5	27	(Italy) Michele Alboreto	Ferrari	1:27.017	1:26.102	+3.063	5
6	18	(United States) Eddie Cheever	Arrows-Megatron	1:27.716	1:26.175	+3.136	6
7	2	(Sweden) Stefan Johansson	McLaren-TAG	1:27.701	1:26.317	+3.278	7
8	28	(Austria) Gerhard Berger	Ferrari	1:29.281	1:26.323	+3.284	8
9	20	(Belgium) Thierry Boutsen	Benetton-Ford	1:27.082	1:26.630	+3.591	9
10	7	(Italy) Riccardo Patrese	Brabham-BMW	1:26.957	1:26.763	+3.724	10
11	17	(United Kingdom) Derek Warwick	Arrows-Megatron	1:27.685	1:27.294	+4.255	11
12	19	(Italy) Teo Fabi	Benetton-Ford	1:29.264	1:27.622	+4.583	12
13	24	(Italy) Alessandro Nannini	Minardi-Motori Moderni	1:28.517	1:27.731	+4.692	13
14	9	(United Kingdom) Martin Brundle	Zakspeed	1:29.801	1:27.894	+4.855	14
15	3	(United Kingdom) Jonathan Palmer	Tyrrell-Ford	1:30.307	1:28.088	+5.049	15
16	21	(Italy) Alex Caffi	Osella-Alfa Romeo	1:36.267	1:28.233	+5.194	16
17	11	(Japan) Satoru Nakajima	Lotus-Honda	1:30.606	1:28.890	+5.851	17
18	30	(France) Philippe Alliot	Lola-Ford	1:29.114	1:29.459	+6.075	18
19	16	(Italy) Ivan Capelli	March-Ford	1:31.589	1:29.147	+6.108	19
20	26	(Italy) Piercarlo Ghinzani	Ligier-Megatron	1:31.098	1:29.258	+6.219	20
21	8	(Italy) Andrea de Cesaris	Brabham-BMW	1:32.643	1:29.827	+6.788	21
22	25	(France) René Arnoux	Ligier-Megatron	1:31.270	1:30.000	+6.961	22
23	4	(France) Philippe Streiff	Tyrrell-Ford	1:30.765	1:30.143	+7.104	23
24	23	(Spain) Adrián Campos	Minardi-Motori Moderni	1:30.805	—	+7.766	DNS
25	14	(France) Pascal Fabre	AGS-Ford	1:35.179	1:31.667	+8.628	24
EX	10	(West Germany) Christian Danner	Zakspeed	—	—	—	—

=== Race ===
Numbers in brackets refer to positions of normally aspirated entrants competing for the Jim Clark Trophy.

Pos	No	Driver	Constructor	Laps	Time/Retired	Grid	Points
1	12	(Brazil) Ayrton Senna	Lotus-Honda	78	1:57:54.085	2	9
2	6	(Brazil) Nelson Piquet	Williams-Honda	78	+ 33.212	3	6
3	27	(Italy) Michele Alboreto	Ferrari	78	+ 1:12.839	5	4
4	28	(Austria) Gerhard Berger	Ferrari	77	+ 1 lap	8	3
5 (1)	3	(United Kingdom) Jonathan Palmer	Tyrrell-Ford	76	+ 2 laps	15	2
6 (2)	16	(Italy) Ivan Capelli	March-Ford	76	+ 2 laps	19	1
7	9	(United Kingdom) Martin Brundle	Zakspeed	76	+ 2 laps	14	
8	19	(Italy) Teo Fabi	Benetton-Ford	76	+ 2 laps	12	
9	1	(France) Alain Prost	McLaren-TAG	75	Engine	4	
10	11	(Japan) Satoru Nakajima	Lotus-Honda	75	+ 3 laps	17	
11	25	(France) René Arnoux	Ligier-Megatron	74	+ 4 laps	22	
12	26	(Italy) Piercarlo Ghinzani	Ligier-Megatron	74	+ 4 laps	20	
13 (3)	14	(France) Pascal Fabre	AGS-Ford	71	+ 7 laps	24	
Ret	18	(United States) Eddie Cheever	Arrows-Megatron	59	Overheating	6	
Ret	17	(United Kingdom) Derek Warwick	Arrows-Megatron	58	Gearbox	11	
Ret	2	(Sweden) Stefan Johansson	McLaren-TAG	57	Engine	7	
Ret	30	(France) Philippe Alliot	Lola-Ford	42	Engine	18	
Ret	7	(Italy) Riccardo Patrese	Brabham-BMW	41	Electrical	10	
Ret	21	(Italy) Alex Caffi	Osella-Alfa Romeo	39	Electrical	16	
Ret	8	(Italy) Andrea de Cesaris	Brabham-BMW	38	Suspension	21	
Ret	5	(United Kingdom) Nigel Mansell	Williams-Honda	29	Turbo/Exhaust	1	
Ret	24	(Italy) Alessandro Nannini	Minardi-Motori Moderni	21	Electrical	13	
Ret	4	(France) Philippe Streiff	Tyrrell-Ford	9	Accident	23	
Ret	20	(Belgium) Thierry Boutsen	Benetton-Ford	5	Transmission	9	
DNS	23	(Spain) Adrián Campos	Minardi-Motori Moderni		Non Starter		
EX	10	(Germany) Christian Danner	Zakspeed		Excluded		

== Championship standings after the race ==
Drivers' Championship standings

Pos	Driver	Points
1	(France) Alain Prost	18
2	(Brazil) Ayrton Senna	15
3	(Sweden) Stefan Johansson	13
4	(Brazil) Nelson Piquet	12
5	(United Kingdom) Nigel Mansell	10

Constructors' Championship standings

Pos	Constructor	Points
1	(United Kingdom) McLaren-TAG	31
2	(United Kingdom) Williams-Honda	22
3	(United Kingdom) Lotus-Honda	18
4	(Italy) Ferrari	14
5	(United Kingdom) Brabham-BMW	4

Jim Clark Trophy standings

Pos	Driver	Points
1	(France) Philippe Streiff	21
2	(United Kingdom) Jonathan Palmer	18
3	(France) Pascal Fabre	16
4	(France) Philippe Alliot	15
5	(Italy) Ivan Capelli	6

Colin Chapman trophy standings

Pos	Constructor	Points
1	(United Kingdom) Tyrrell-Ford	39
2	(France) AGS-Ford	16
3	(France) Lola-Ford	15
4	(United Kingdom) March-Ford	6

- Note: Only the top five positions are included for all four sets of standings.

Previous race: 1987 Belgian Grand Prix	FIA Formula One World Championship; 1987 season	Next race: 1987 Detroit Grand Prix
Previous race: 1986 Monaco Grand Prix	Monaco Grand Prix	Next race: 1988 Monaco Grand Prix
