= 1987 Detroit Grand Prix =

- Race 5 of 16 in the 1987 Formula One World Championship

Race details
- Date: June 21, 1987
- Official name: 6th Detroit Grand Prix
- Location: Detroit Street Circuit; Detroit, Michigan
- Course: Temporary street course
- Course length: 4.023 km (2.500 miles)
- Distance: 63 laps, 253.449 km (157.5 miles)
- Weather: Clear with rain showers later on; temperatures reaching up to 78.1 °F (25.6 °C); wind speeds up to 19.6 miles per hour (31.5 km/h)

Pole position
Driver	(United Kingdom) Nigel Mansell	Williams-Honda
- Time: 1:39.264

Fastest lap
Driver	(Brazil) Ayrton Senna	Lotus-Honda
- Time: 1:40.464 on lap 39

Podium
First	(Brazil) Ayrton Senna	Lotus-Honda
Second	(Brazil) Nelson Piquet	Williams-Honda
Third	(France) Alain Prost	McLaren-TAG

The 1987 Detroit Grand Prix was a Formula One motor race held on June 21, 1987, in Detroit, Michigan. It was the sixth Detroit Grand Prix. It was held over 63 laps of the 4.023 km (2.500 mi) circuit for a race distance of 253 kilometres.

The race was won by Ayrton Senna in the Lotus 99T with its computer-controlled active suspension. It was the second win in succession for Senna after his victory at Monaco. The Lotus rode the bumpy street circuit far better than the competition allowing Senna to take care of his tyres and cruise to a 33-second victory over the Williams FW11B of Nelson Piquet with reigning world champion Alain Prost finishing third in his McLaren MP4/3.

Poleman Nigel Mansell, the only driver ever to lap the 4.023 km (2.5 mi) Detroit circuit in under 1:40 during qualifying, led the race until his stop for tyres, but soon after began to fall away with cramp in his right leg making it hard to push the brake pedal. He later said that he had almost retired due to the pain but managed to finish in 5th place, one lap down on Senna.

Prost tried to convince McLaren via the radio that his tyres were OK and he did not need to stop, but he gave in to orders and pitted for fresh tyres. It was there that Goodyear technicians discovered Prost was correct and he had not needed to stop, though this did not alter the call for Piquet to stop as Prost had a reputation of being easier on his tyres than most.

Senna's back-to-back victories gave him a two-point lead in the championship over Prost, but it would be a brief surge. Senna would not win again this year. It would also be the last win in the very long history of Team Lotus which began with their first win in the 1961 United States Grand Prix. The next occasion on which a car bearing the Lotus name would win a Grand Prix was the 2012 Abu Dhabi Grand Prix, won by Kimi Räikkönen driving for the Lotus F1 team.

== Summary ==
=== Qualifying ===
Ayrton Senna repeated his 1986 win in Detroit and won his second 1987 race in a row and the second win for a car with active suspension. The win in Monaco three weeks before had proven that Lotus's new system worked, and on the bumpy Detroit circuit, it was even more of an advantage. Superior tyre wear allowed Senna to run the entire race without stopping, and he came home over half a minute ahead of the Williams-Honda of eventual Driver's Champion Nelson Piquet.

Normally, the Detroit race was immediately preceded or followed by the Canadian Grand Prix. In 1987, however, FISA had demanded improvements to the circuit in Montreal, including new pits. When it was determined that these changes could not be completed in time, along with sponsorship problems, the race was cancelled and there would be no Canadian race for only the second time since 1967.

On Friday, Nigel Mansell's Williams was fastest in both qualifying sessions, ahead of Senna's Lotus and Piquet, in the second Williams. It rained on Friday night, but the track was dry for the afternoon session on Saturday. In the final session, Senna briefly took the top spot, but Mansell took it back and ended up more than a second quicker for his fourth pole in five races on the season. American Eddie Cheever was sixth for Arrows, just behind Alain Prost's McLaren MP4/3.

=== Race ===
It rained again on Saturday night and Sunday morning, but, after a soaked warm-up on race morning, the start was dry. The first three got away from the grid in order, while Cheever jumped up to fourth and Teo Fabi went from eighth to fifth in the Benetton B187, followed by Michele Alboreto (Ferrari F1/87), Prost, Thierry Boutsen (Benetton B187) and Stefan Johansson (McLaren MP4/3). On lap three, Piquet went wide in a corner and picked up debris that led to a slow puncture. Cheever and Fabi got by Piquet before he was forced to pit. Three laps later, after repeated attempts to get around Cheever, Fabi put his front wing into Cheever's rear tire, puncturing it and breaking the nose of his Benetton B187. Fabi came around to the pits, driving without a nosecone, but retired the vehicle there. Speaking with CBS' Dave Despain directly after, Fabi confirmed the only problem was a missing wing. Cheever made it to the pits around the same time, losing a lap and rejoining in 19th position.

By lap ten, Mansell was five seconds ahead of Senna, with Alboreto another 23 seconds back in third. Suddenly, Senna felt his brake pedal go soft entering a turn and he narrowly avoided hitting the wall. He decided to back off and allow the brakes to cool, dropping three seconds per lap from his times. Primarily concerned about staying ahead of Alboreto, Senna got a break when the Ferrari F1/87's gearbox failed on lap 25, handing third place to Prost. On the next lap, Senna began to go after Mansell.

On lap 26, Mansell's lead was 18.8 seconds over Senna, but he was beginning to experience cramps in his right leg. A stop for tyres on lap 34 took 18 seconds when the right rear wheel nut refused to seat properly. Holding the brakes on much longer than normal made the Englishman's cramp even worse. Prost, now in second, was struggling with brake and gearbox problems as he stopped for tyres.

Senna set the race's fastest lap on lap 39 at 1:40.464, faster than his qualifying time. Realizing that he was faster on his original tyres than the others were on new ones, he decided to finish the race without stopping to change tyres. The Lotus crew emerged in the pit lane for a time as if preparing for a stop, but it became clear that the Brazilian was not in fact coming in. By that time, he was nearly a minute ahead.

Mansell, by this time, was exhausted, his head rolling from side to side in the cockpit. He said after the race that every time he passed the pits, he thought of stopping. On lap 53, Piquet and Prost passed him, and on lap 56, Gerhard Berger did as well. His perseverance gained him two points for fifth, a lap down, while Cheever took the final point.

Senna eased up toward the end, and with three laps to go the skies were threatening rain. It never became an issue, however, as the rain started to fall after the finish, with Senna crossing the line thirty-three seconds ahead. It was the sixth win of his career, but his last in 1987 and the last for the Lotus team, which eventually folded in 1994. Senna said that his tyres were able to last the entire distance for two reasons: the laps he slowed to cool the brakes, and the smooth ride given by the active suspension.

== Classification ==
=== Qualifying ===
Pos	No	Driver	Constructor	Q1	Q2	Gap
1	5	(United Kingdom) Nigel Mansell	Williams-Honda	1:42.223	1:39.264	
2	12	(Brazil) Ayrton Senna	Lotus-Honda	1:42.985	1:40.607	+1.343
3	6	(Brazil) Nelson Piquet	Williams-Honda	1:43.152	1:40.942	+1.678
4	20	(Belgium) Thierry Boutsen	Benetton-Ford	1:44.686	1:42.050	+2.786
5	1	(France) Alain Prost	McLaren-TAG	1:46.042	1:42.357	+3.093
6	18	(United States) Eddie Cheever	Arrows-Megatron	1:45.296	1:42.361	+3.097
7	27	(Italy) Michele Alboreto	Ferrari	1:45.437	1:42.684	+3.420
8	19	(Italy) Teo Fabi	Benetton-Ford	1:47.064	1:42.918	+3.654
9	7	(Italy) Riccardo Patrese	Brabham-BMW	1:46.932	1:43.479	+4.215
10	17	(United Kingdom) Derek Warwick	Arrows-Megatron	1:45.234	1:43.541	+4.277
11	2	(Sweden) Stefan Johansson	McLaren-TAG	1:46.623	1:43.797	+4.533
12	28	(Austria) Gerhard Berger	Ferrari	1:45.054	1:43.816	+4.552
13	3	(United Kingdom) Jonathan Palmer	Tyrrell-Ford	1:47.010	1:44.350	+5.086
14	4	(France) Philippe Streiff	Tyrrell-Ford	1:47.963	1:45.037	+5.773
15	9	(United Kingdom) Martin Brundle	Zakspeed	1:48.932	1:45.291	+6.027
16	10	(West Germany) Christian Danner	Zakspeed	1:48.867	1:45.740	+6.476
17	8	(Italy) Andrea de Cesaris	Brabham-BMW	1:47.670	1:46.046	+6.782
18	24	(Italy) Alessandro Nannini	Minardi-Motori Moderni	1:46.449	1:46.083	+6.819
19	21	(Italy) Alex Caffi	Osella-Alfa Romeo	1:55.787	1:46.124	+6.860
20	30	(France) Philippe Alliot	Lola-Ford	1:47.470	1:46.194	+6.930
21	25	(France) René Arnoux	Ligier-Megatron	1:48.338	1:46.211	+6.947
22	16	(Italy) Ivan Capelli	March-Ford	1:49.969	1:46.269	+7.005
23	26	(Italy) Piercarlo Ghinzani	Ligier-Megatron	1:48.661	1:47.471	+8.207
24	11	(Japan) Satoru Nakajima	Lotus-Honda	1:51.355	1:48.801	+9.537
25	23	(Spain) Adrián Campos	Minardi-Motori Moderni	1:50.495	3:26.319	+11.231
26	14	(France) Pascal Fabre	AGS-Ford	1:57.475	1:53.644	+14.380

=== Race ===
Pos	No	Driver	Constructor	Laps	Time/Retired	Grid	Points
1	12	(Brazil) Ayrton Senna	Lotus-Honda	63	1:50:16.358	2	9
2	6	(Brazil) Nelson Piquet	Williams-Honda	63	+ 33.819	3	6
3	1	(France) Alain Prost	McLaren-TAG	63	+ 45.327	5	4
4	28	(Austria) Gerhard Berger	Ferrari	63	+ 1:02.601	12	3
5	5	(United Kingdom) Nigel Mansell	Williams-Honda	62	+ 1 Lap	1	2
6	18	(United States) Eddie Cheever	Arrows-Megatron	60	+ 3 Laps	6	1
7	2	(Sweden) Stefan Johansson	McLaren-TAG	60	+ 3 Laps	11	
8	10	(West Germany) Christian Danner	Zakspeed	60	+ 3 Laps	16	
9	7	(Italy) Riccardo Patrese	Brabham-BMW	60	+ 3 Laps	9	
10	25	(France) René Arnoux	Ligier-Megatron	60	+ 3 Laps	21	
11 (1)	3	(United Kingdom) Jonathan Palmer	Tyrrell-Ford	60	+ 3 Laps	13	
12 (2)	14	(France) Pascal Fabre	AGS-Ford	58	+ 5 Laps	26	
Ret	20	(Belgium) Thierry Boutsen	Benetton-Ford	52	Brakes	4	
Ret	26	(Italy) Piercarlo Ghinzani	Ligier-Megatron	51	Clutch	23	
Ret	4	(France) Philippe Streiff	Tyrrell-Ford	44	Wheel	14	
Ret	30	(France) Philippe Alliot	Lola-Ford	38	Accident	20	
Ret	27	(Italy) Michele Alboreto	Ferrari	25	Gearbox	7	
Ret	24	(Italy) Alessandro Nannini	Minardi-Motori Moderni	22	Gearbox	18	
Ret	9	(United Kingdom) Martin Brundle	Zakspeed	16	Turbo	15	
Ret	17	(United Kingdom) Derek Warwick	Arrows-Megatron	12	Accident	10	
Ret	16	(Italy) Ivan Capelli	March-Ford	9	Electrical	22	
Ret	19	(Italy) Teo Fabi	Benetton-Ford	6	Collision	8	
Ret	21	(Italy) Alex Caffi	Osella-Alfa Romeo	3	Transmission	19	
Ret	8	(Italy) Andrea de Cesaris	Brabham-BMW	2	Gearbox	17	
Ret	23	(Spain) Adrián Campos	Minardi-Motori Moderni	1	Accident	25	
Ret	11	(Japan) Satoru Nakajima	Lotus-Honda	0	Collision	24	

- Numbers in brackets refer to positions of normally aspirated entrants competing for the Jim Clark Trophy.

== Championship standings after the race ==
Drivers' Championship standings

Pos	Driver	Points
1	(Brazil) Ayrton Senna	24
2	(France) Alain Prost	22
3	(Brazil) Nelson Piquet	18
4	(Sweden) Stefan Johansson	13
5	(United Kingdom) Nigel Mansell	12

Constructors' Championship standings

Pos	Constructor	Points
1	(United Kingdom) McLaren-TAG	35
2	(United Kingdom) Williams-Honda	30
3	(United Kingdom) Lotus-Honda	27
4	(Italy) Ferrari	17
5	(United Kingdom) Brabham-BMW	4

Jim Clark Trophy standings

Pos	Driver	Points
1	(United Kingdom) Jonathan Palmer	27
2	(France) Pascal Fabre	22
3	(France) Philippe Streiff	21
4	(France) Philippe Alliot	15
5	(Italy) Ivan Capelli	6

Colin Chapman trophy standings

Pos	Constructor	Points
1	(United Kingdom) Tyrrell-Ford	48
2	(France) AGS-Ford	22
3	(France) Lola-Ford	15
4	(United Kingdom) March-Ford	6

- Note: Only the top five positions are included for all four sets of standings.

Previous race: 1987 Monaco Grand Prix	FIA Formula One World Championship; 1987 season	Next race: 1987 French Grand Prix
Previous race: 1986 Detroit Grand Prix	Detroit Grand Prix	Next race: 1988 Detroit Grand Prix
