= McLaren MP4/3 =

Formula One Car

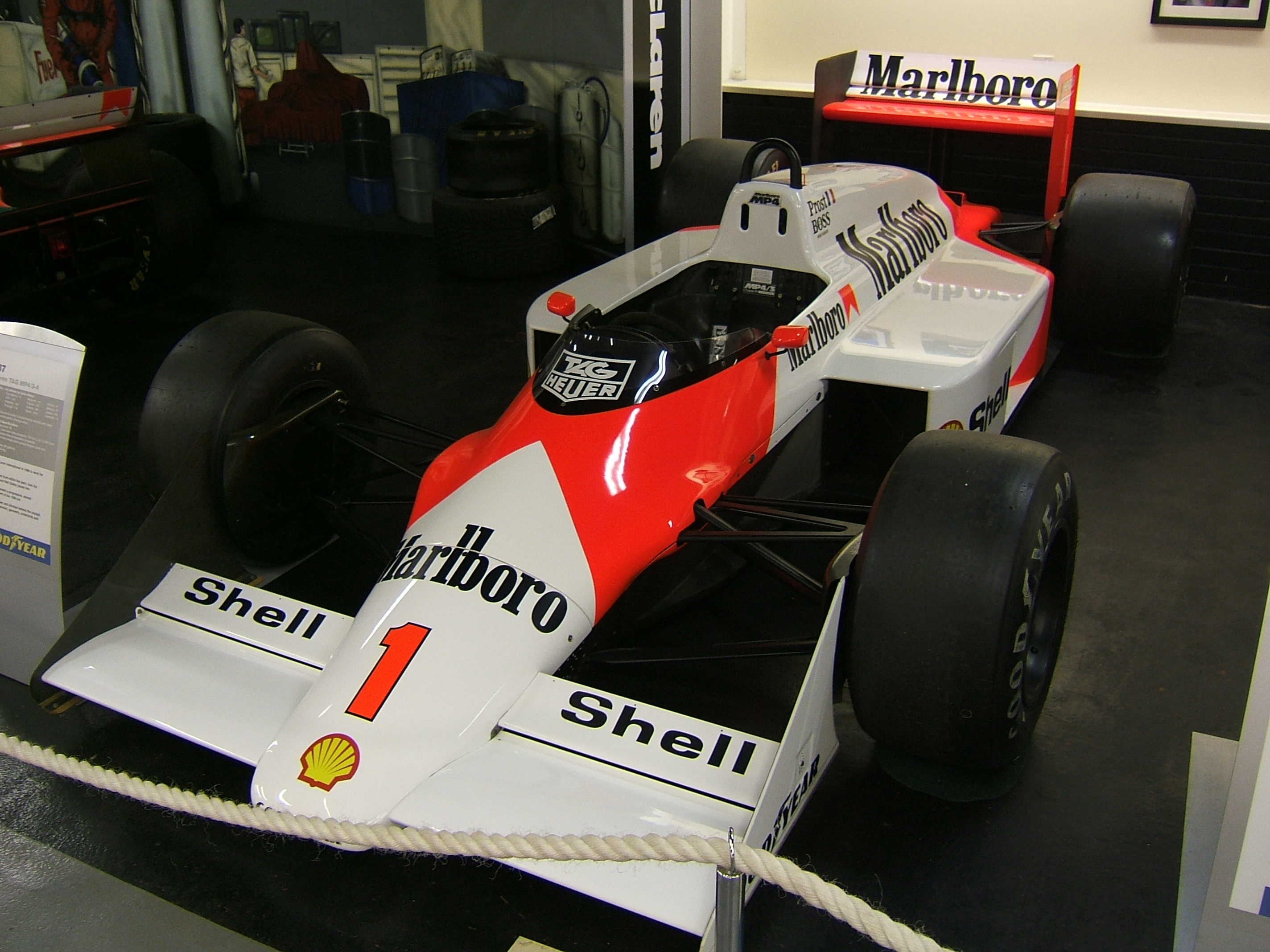
- The MP4/3 of Alain Prost
- Category: Formula One
- Constructor: McLaren (chassis); Porsche (engine)
- Designers: Steve Nichols (Chief Designer, Executive Engineer); Neil Oatley (Deputy Chief Designer); Gordon Kimball (Deputy Chief Designer); Tim Wright (Senior Engineer); Matthew Jeffreys (Senior Engineer); Bob Bell (Chief Aerodynamicist); Hans Mezger (Chief Engine Designer (Porsche))
- Predecessor: MP4/2C
- Successor: MP4/4

Technical specifications
- Chassis: Carbon fibre and Aluminium honeycomb monocoque
- Suspension (front): Double wishbone, pushrod activated inboard Bilstein spring / damper
- Suspension (rear): As front
- Axle track: Front: 1,841 mm (72.5 in); Rear: 1,676 mm (66.0 in)
- Wheelbase: 2,794 mm (110.0 in)
- Engine: TAG-Porsche TTE PO1, 1,496 cc (91.3 cu in), 90° V6, turbo (4.0 bar limited), mid-engine, longitudinally-mounted
- Transmission: Getrag 5-speed manual
- Power: 850 hp (633.8 kW) @ 12,000 rpm
- Weight: 540 kg (1,190 lb)
- Fuel: Shell
- Tyres: Goodyear

Competition history
- Notable entrants: Marlboro McLaren International
- Notable drivers: 1. (France) Alain Prost; 2. (Sweden) Stefan Johansson
- Debut: 1987 Brazilian Grand Prix
- First win: 1987 Brazilian Grand Prix
- Last win: 1987 Portuguese Grand Prix
- Last event: 1987 Australian Grand Prix
| Races | Wins | Poles | F/Laps |
|---|---|---|---|
| 16 | 3 | 0 | 2 |
- Constructors' Championships: 0
- Drivers' Championships: 0

The McLaren MP4/3 was the car with which the McLaren team competed in the 1987 Formula One World Championship. The car was designed under the leadership of long-time McLaren engineer Steve Nichols, in collaboration with Neil Oatley, Gordon Kimball, Tim Wright and Bob Bell. It was also the last McLaren car to be powered by the TAG-Porsche turbo engine that had been introduced in 1983. The car was driven by double World Champion Alain Prost, in his fourth season with the team, and Stefan Johansson, who moved from Ferrari.

== Design ==
The MP4/3's aerodynamics were completely different from the MP4/2, and the car appeared much more low-slung, to take advantage of the maximum fuel capacity limit of 195 litres, rather than the 220 litre limit in effect from 1984 to 1985. With addition of side-ducted radiators, the car's basic exterior shape was all-new and sleeker than its bulbous looking predecessor with the only visual reminder of the car being its nose section, though this too had been re-designed and was in fact lower and approximately 10% smaller. The suspension set up of the new car was virtually identical to the MP4/2C

To many, the MP4/3 seemed to have been designed along the lines of the lowline Brabham BT55 used by the Brabham team in 1986. Brabham's long time designer Gordon Murray had joined McLaren in 1987 as its new Technical Director taking over from John Barnard and this led to the popular belief that he had played a major role in the design of the new look McLaren. However, team manager Jo Ramírez downplayed Murray's involvement in the design of the MP4/3, saying that the BT55's design had no bearing on the car and that Murray had primarily been in charge of quality control. However, Murray himself has since said that this car, and its successor the McLaren MP4/4, were designed using his original Brabham BT55 drawings as a base (as they were legally his, Murray had brought the BT55's drawings with him to McLaren). The claim has since been disputed by engineering director Steve Nichols as well as various other members of McLaren at the time.

== Engine ==
The engine was the same 1.5 litre, Porsche built, TAG funded and badged twin-turbo V6 engine that had so successfully powered the MP4/2, but with slight changes in compression and engine balancing, to cope with not only the new reduced fuel limit, but also with the FIA's mandated pop-off valve which restricted turbo boost to 4.0 bar after turbo charging was unrestricted prior to 1987.

According to designer Steve Nichols, one of the drawbacks with the TAG turbo engine was that each bank of cylinders had its own, somewhat tall, plenum chamber on top of the engine (see picture) with each needing its own FIA pop-off valve. Nichols said this and the 195L fuel tank size limited how low the bodywork could be towards the rear of the MP4/3. It was something that would not be a problem with the smaller and more compact Honda V6 turbo the team would use in 1988 as well as the fuel tank size reduction from 195 to 150L.

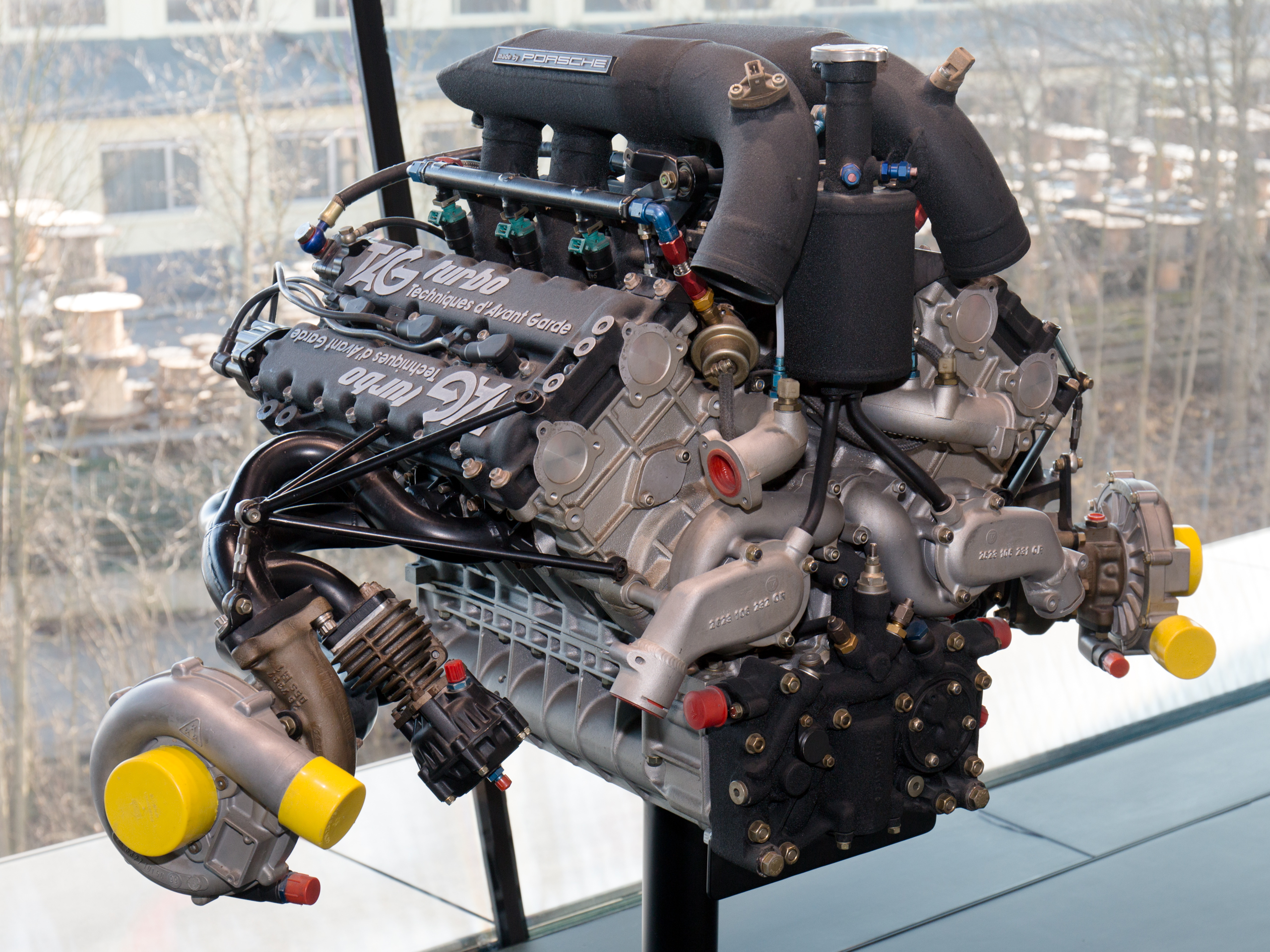
The Porsche built TAG TTE PO1 V6 turbo

=== Specifications ===
Weight: 150 kg
Engine: TAG TTE PO1 T
Engine Configuration: 90° V6T
Bore: 82 mm (3.23 in)
Stroke: 47.3 mm (1.86 in)
Valves: 4 per cylinder
Displacement: 1.5 L (1,496 cc)
No. of revolutions: Max. 12,300 rpm
Power: 634 kW (862 PS; 850 hp)
Power/liter: 467 hp/L

== Success ==
There were three wins in 1987 with the MP4/3 by Alain Prost at Grand Prix of Brazil, Belgium, and Portugal. Stefan Johansson managed a few podium places, but he would be replaced in 1988 by Ayrton Senna. McLaren still managed to finish 2nd overall, with 76 points, in the Constructor's Championship. The MP4/3 represented the pinnacle of the development of the McLaren TAG-Porsche partnership. The Porsche-TAG engine featured an updated Motronic 1.7 engine management system, and now produced 790 bhp (590 kW) in race trim and up to 850 bhp (630 kW) in qualifying.

Although a number of teams, notably Benetton with their Ford V6 turbo and Arrows with their 4 cyl Megatron turbo (formerly the BMW turbo), encountered problems with the pop-off valve during 1987 when it would often come in lower than the 4.0 bar limit thus giving less horsepower, McLaren got around this by generally setting their TAG's turbo limit at 3.6 bar in 1987. This also allowed McLaren the advantage of better fuel economy.

The MP4/3 is still considered to be one of the most powerful F1 cars ever made, since turbo boost pressure would be further reduced to 2.5 bar in 1988, reducing the power output of the turbo engines to around 650 bhp (480 kW) in a bid to make the naturally aspirated cars more competitive. Turbocharged engines were then banned completely in 1989, so the turbo era in Formula One may remain possibly the high-water mark for horsepower levels in Formula 1.

Prost's win in the 1987 Portuguese Grand Prix made him, at that time, the driver with the most wins in Formula One history, beating Jackie Stewart's record of 27 wins which had stood since Stewart retired at the end of 1973.

The MP4/3 was the last McLaren Grand Prix car to use the TAG-Porsche engine. Its successor, the highly successful MP4/4, would be powered by the Honda V6 turbo.

== Chassis log history ==
Five new MP4/3 cars were moulded from carbon fibre with assistance from Hercules Aerospace, as since the creation of the all-new MP4/1 in 1981. The chassis numbers, 1 through 5, were used throughout the year, with three new cars ready for the first race in Brazil.

Two MP4/3s were destroyed during 1987, but three complete MP4/3s still exist: Chassis #4 is on display at the Donington Museum, chassis #5 is still owned by McLaren, and chassis #1, the only one in private hands, belongs to a Porsche collector in the United States and was auctioned on 9 March 2012 at Amelia Island, FL by Gooding & Company.

#1: Used as a spare car for every race except Österreichring. Stefan Johansson raced this chassis only once, at the aborted start (1st) at Österreichring.

#2: Raced by Johansson at Rio, Imola, Spa, Monaco, Detroit, Paul Ricard, Silverstone, Hockenheim, and Hungaroring. The car was written off in practice at Österreichring by Johansson, after a deer struck the car, and crashed.

#3: Raced by Alain Prost at Rio, Imola, Spa, Monaco, Detroit, and Paul Ricard. Car modified for Johansson for race use at Österreichring. It was originally a spare car at Mexico City, but then raced by Johansson, but written off in 1st-lap accident.

#4: New car for Prost to race at Silverstone, Hockenheim, Hungaroring, Österreichring, Monza, Estoril, Jerez, Mexico City, Suzuka, and Adelaide.

#5: New car for Johansson at Monza, Estoril, Jerez, Suzuka, and Adelaide.

The sixth car, known as the MP4/3B, was a test mule for the Honda turbo engine that would power McLaren's hopes for 1988. The MP4/3B never raced, but was tested by Prost, and later his 1988 teammate Ayrton Senna, until the all-new MP4/4 made its track debut at Imola a week before the start of the 1988 season (Prost lapped Imola over 2 seconds faster in the MP4/4 than he had in the MP4/3B. The MP4/4 would go on to be the most dominant single season car in F1 history, winning 15 of 1988's 16 races, as well as claiming pole in 15). After finishing the role, the sixth car went to Argentina and is on display at the Juan Manuel Fangio Museum in Balcarce.

== Complete Formula One results ==
(key) (results in italics indicate fastest lap)

| Year | Team | Engine | Tyres | Drivers | 1 | 2 | 3 | 4 | 5 | 6 | 7 | 8 | 9 | 10 | 11 | 12 | 13 | 14 | 15 | 16 | Points | WCC |
|---|---|---|---|---|---|---|---|---|---|---|---|---|---|---|---|---|---|---|---|---|---|---|
| 1987 | Marlboro McLaren International | TAG Porsche TTE PO1; V6 tc | G | | BRA | SMR | BEL | MON | DET | FRA | GBR | GER | HUN | AUT | ITA | POR | ESP | MEX | JPN | AUS | 76 | 2nd |
| 1987 | Marlboro McLaren International | TAG Porsche TTE PO1; V6 tc | G | Alain Prost | 1 | Ret | 1 | 9 | 3 | 3 | Ret | 7 | 3 | 6 | 15 | 1 | 2 | Ret | 7 | Ret | 76 | 2nd |
| 1987 | Marlboro McLaren International | TAG Porsche TTE PO1; V6 tc | G | Stefan Johansson | 3 | 4 | 2 | Ret | 7 | 8 | Ret | 2 | Ret | 7 | 6 | 5 | 3 | Ret | 3 | Ret | 76 | 2nd |
