= McLaren MP4/5 =

Open-wheel racing car

McLaren MP4/5 McLaren MP4/5B
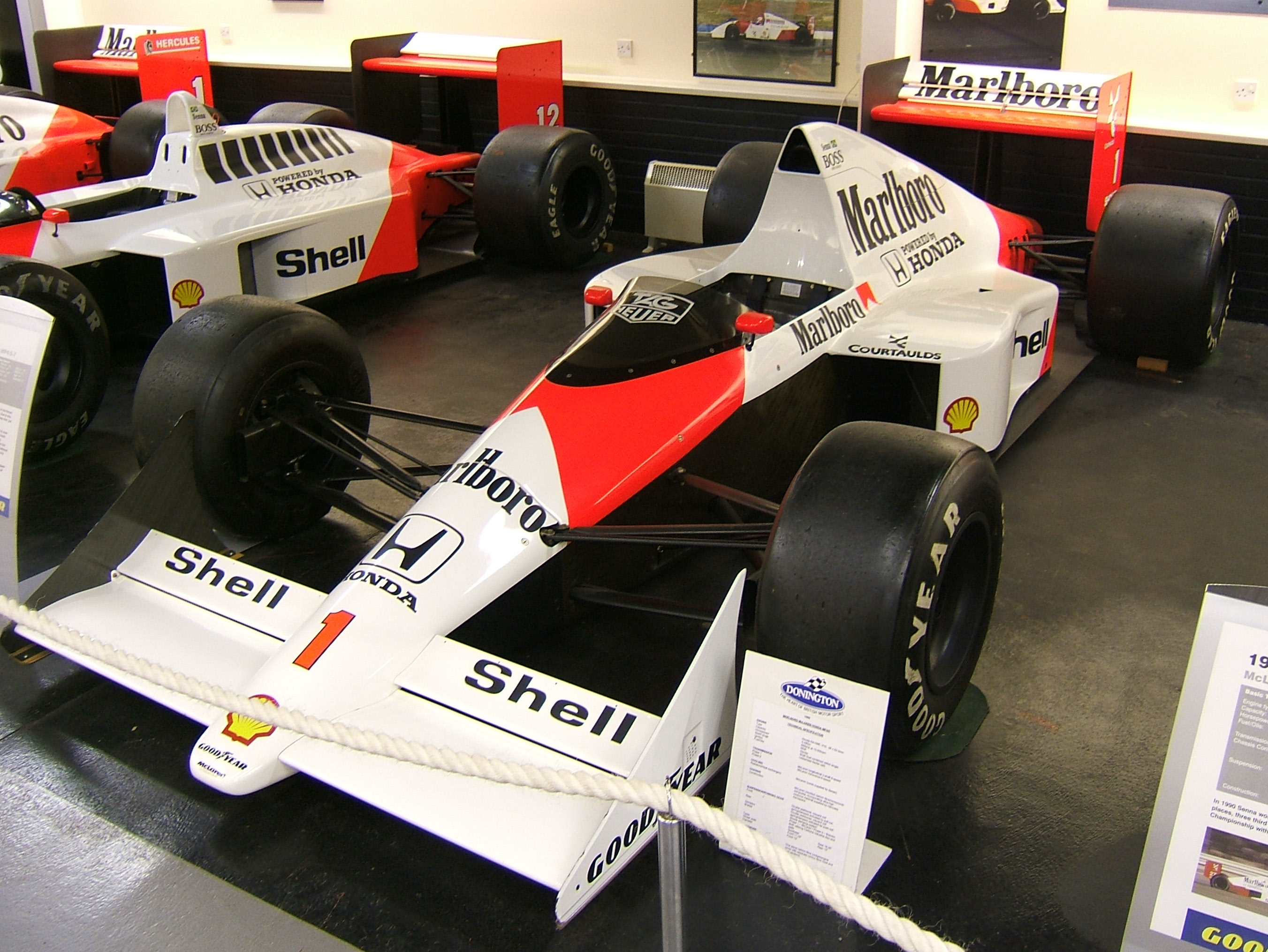
- 1989 MP4/5 chassis
- Category: Formula One
- Constructor: McLaren International (chassis); Honda Racing F1 (engine)
- Designers: Gordon Murray (Technical Director); Neil Oatley (Chief Designer); Mike Gascoyne (Head of Aerodynamics); Osamu Goto (Engine Technical Director (Honda))
- Predecessor: MP4/4
- Successor: MP4/6

Technical specifications
- Chassis: Carbon fibre and Kevlar monocoque
- Suspension (front): Double wishbones, pull-rod actuated coil springs and dampers
- Suspension (rear): Double wishbones, rocker-arm actuated coil springs and dampers
- Axle track: Front: 1,820 mm (72 in); Rear: 1,670 mm (66 in)
- Wheelbase: 1989: 2,896 mm (114.0 in); 1990: 2,940 mm (115.7 in)
- Engine: 1989: Honda RA109E; 1990: Honda RA100E; 3.5 L (213.6 cu in), 72° V10, NA, mid-engine, longitudinally mounted
- Transmission: Weismann/McLaren Longitudinal and Transverse 6-Speed manual
- Power: 675–710 hp (503.3–529.4 kW) @ 13,500 rpm
- Fuel: Shell
- Tyres: Goodyear

Competition history
- Notable entrants: Honda Marlboro McLaren
- Notable drivers: 1./27. (Brazil) Ayrton Senna; 2. (France) Alain Prost; 28. (Austria) Gerhard Berger
- Debut: 1989 Brazilian Grand Prix (MP4/5); 1990 United States Grand Prix (MP4/5B)
- First win: 1989 San Marino Grand Prix (MP4/5); 1990 United States Grand Prix (MP4/5B)
- Last win: 1989 Spanish Grand Prix (MP4/5); 1990 Italian Grand Prix (MP4/5B)
- Last event: 1989 Australian Grand Prix (MP4/5); 1990 Australian Grand Prix (MP4/5B)
Races	Wins	Podiums	Poles	F/Laps
32	16	36	27	13
- Constructors' Championships: 2 (1989, 1990)
- Drivers' Championships: 2 (1989, Alain Prost; 1990, Ayrton Senna)

The McLaren MP4/5, and its derived sister model, the MP4/5B, were highly successful Formula One racing cars designed by the McLaren Formula One team based in Woking, England, and powered by Honda's naturally-aspirated RA109E and RA100E V10 engines respectively. With the overall leadership of Technical Director Gordon Murray, the design team was led by Neil Oatley, with Steve Nichols, Tim Wright, Bob Bell, Mike Gascoyne and Pete Weismann. Osamu Goto was the Honda F1 team chief designer for the car's engine.

The MP4/5 was loosely based on its 1988 predecessor, the all-conquering MP4/4. McLaren used the new car for half of the 1989 season using the Weismann Longitudinal Transmission from the MP4/4, and the MP4/5B with the Weismann Transverse Transmission for the last half of the 1989 season and for 1990, earning back-to-back drivers' and constructors' world titles with the type. As of 2025, the 1989 McLaren MP4/5 is the last McLaren to win the double and to finish 1st and 2nd in the drivers' championship in the same season.

== MP4/5 ==
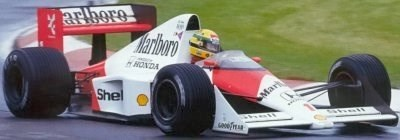
Ayrton Senna driving the MP4/5 in 1989

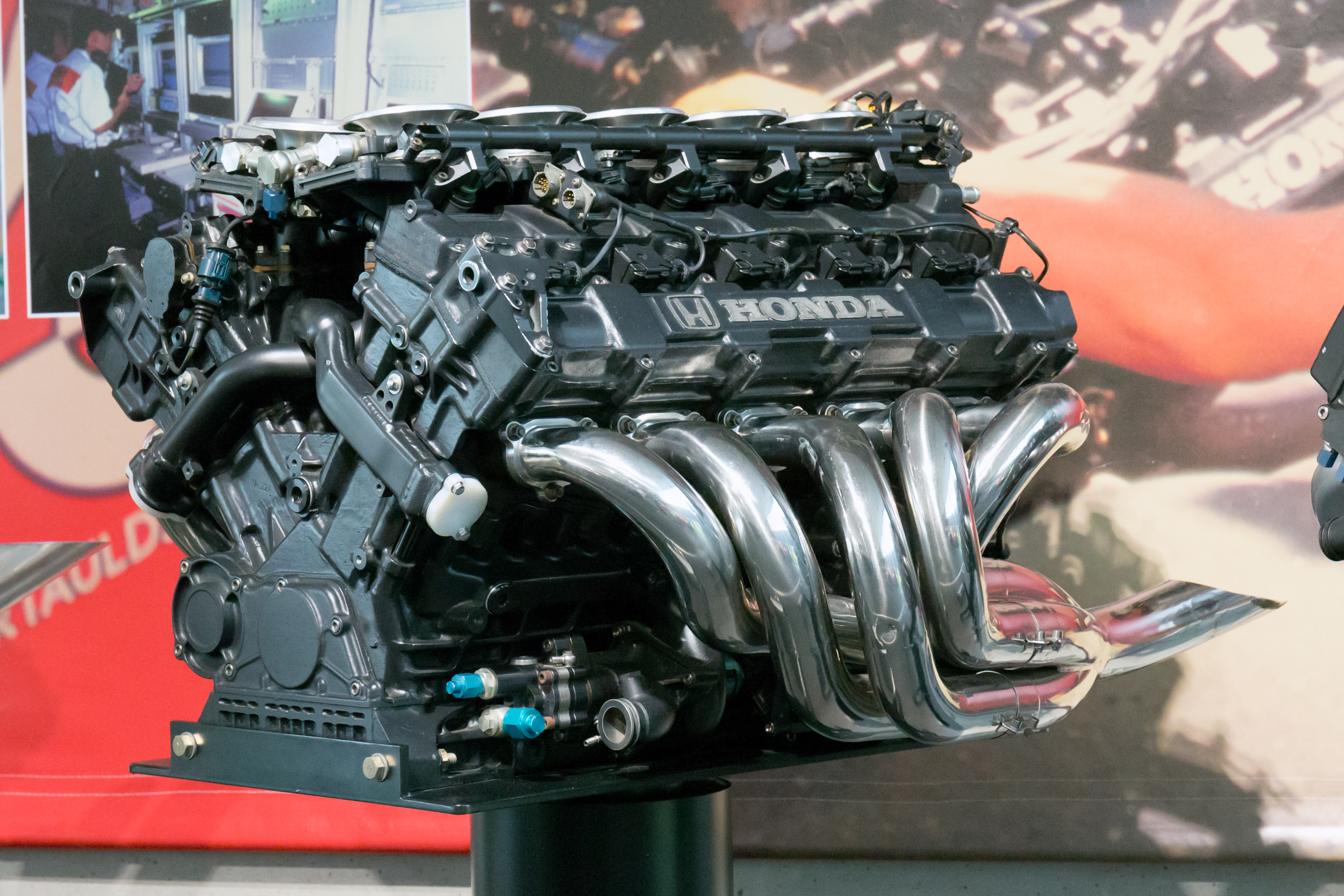
1989 Honda RA109E V10 engine

1989 was the first year where naturally-aspirated engines were compulsory for all teams after the banning of the turbocharged units at the end of the previous season. To this end, Honda built a 3.5-litre V10 engine, developed throughout most of the latter half of 1987 and through 1988. The MP4/5 was unveiled for pre-season testing and it was instantly on the pace, as well as reliable. Developed by Neil Oatley, the MP4/5 looked like the car to beat in the new season. While Scuderia Ferrari's new 640 was a fast all-around car that season, particularly in the hands of Nigel Mansell, it was also chronically unreliable due to its new semi-electronic gearbox shift, giving a further advantage to McLaren. The Honda-powered MP4/5 proved to have the outright pace over the rest of the field, with fifteen pole positions, thirteen of them by Senna which equaled his 1988 record in the MP4/4. At the Mexican Grand Prix, Senna scored his 34th career pole in the MP4/5, breaking the previous record of 33 held by the late Jim Clark that had stood since 1968.

Honda supplied McLaren with eight engines at each grand prix meeting. The car's monocoque was built from carbon-fibre composite materials produced by Hercules Aerospace, with interchangeable aerodynamic parts attached to the chassis. Early on the car was found to have imbalanced handling in fast corners, with Honda improving the smoothness of the car's throttle response for the second round at the Imola circuit to help alleviate these issues. The car initially used brakes made by McLaren, before changing to Brembo brakes from the third round at the Circuit de Monaco. Alain Prost chose to have the engine tuned to use a richer fuel mixture than the engine in Senna's car, as he believed this better suited his driving style. During the fifth round at the Phoenix street circuit it was found that the two-way radio used for communication between drivers and the pit wall was causing interference with sensors used by the car's engine control unit, necessitating a change in design. During the sixth round at the Circuit Gilles Villeneuve a problem was discovered with the design of the engine's lubrication system, exacerbated by water entering the engine as rain fell during the race; changes were made at subsequent rounds to try and prevent this from causing further engine failures. The car initially used a longitudinally-mounted gearbox before a new transversely-mounted gearbox was introduced ahead of the round at Silverstone Circuit. An issue with the welding inside the car's oil tanks was discovered at the Silverstone event, which proved difficult to rectify in a timely manner. Honda introduced two new revisions of its engine towards the end of the season, one intended for higher-speed circuits whilst the other was intended for slower tracks or wet weather conditions.

McLaren took ten victories during the season, six for Ayrton Senna and four for Prost. This was at a time when the relationship between the two men was at its breaking point, so their rivalry pushed the development of the car far ahead of the other teams as they tried to out-do each other (although theirs was a very public rivalry, both actually worked well together in testing and Prost believed neither held back any information). Although Senna won six races to Prost's four and usually finished ahead of the Frenchman in the races, accidents and car breakages meant that he had four fewer points-scoring finishes and finished 16 points behind his French rival in the championship. Senna and Prost's combined points total meant McLaren easily won their second straight Constructors' Championship. A version that had a transversely-mounted gearbox made its debut at the British Grand Prix, with Prost taking victory however Senna went off at Becketts while struggling with the gearbox in his car.

Like 1988, the Drivers' Championship was a two-horse race between defending champion Senna and dual champion Prost. The championship was settled at the penultimate race in Japan. After dominating qualifying (with Senna predictably on pole), the two McLarens were evenly matched in the race and simply drove away from the rest of the field until their fateful collision at the chicane on lap 46. Prost was out on the spot while Senna was able to restart and after pitting for a new nose section, re-took the lead from the Benetton-Ford of Alessandro Nannini and went on to win the race. Ultimately, however, he was disqualified post-race for receiving a push start and missing the chicane after restarting which gave Prost his 3rd World Championship.

1989 was McLaren's fourth Constructors' Championship of the 1980s following on from 1984, 1985 and 1988, making the team the equal leading constructor of the decade with Williams who won in 1980, 1981, 1986 and 1987. It was also Honda's fourth consecutive Constructors' Championship as an engine manufacturer, and McLaren's fifth Championship overall having won their first in 1974.

== MP4/5B ==
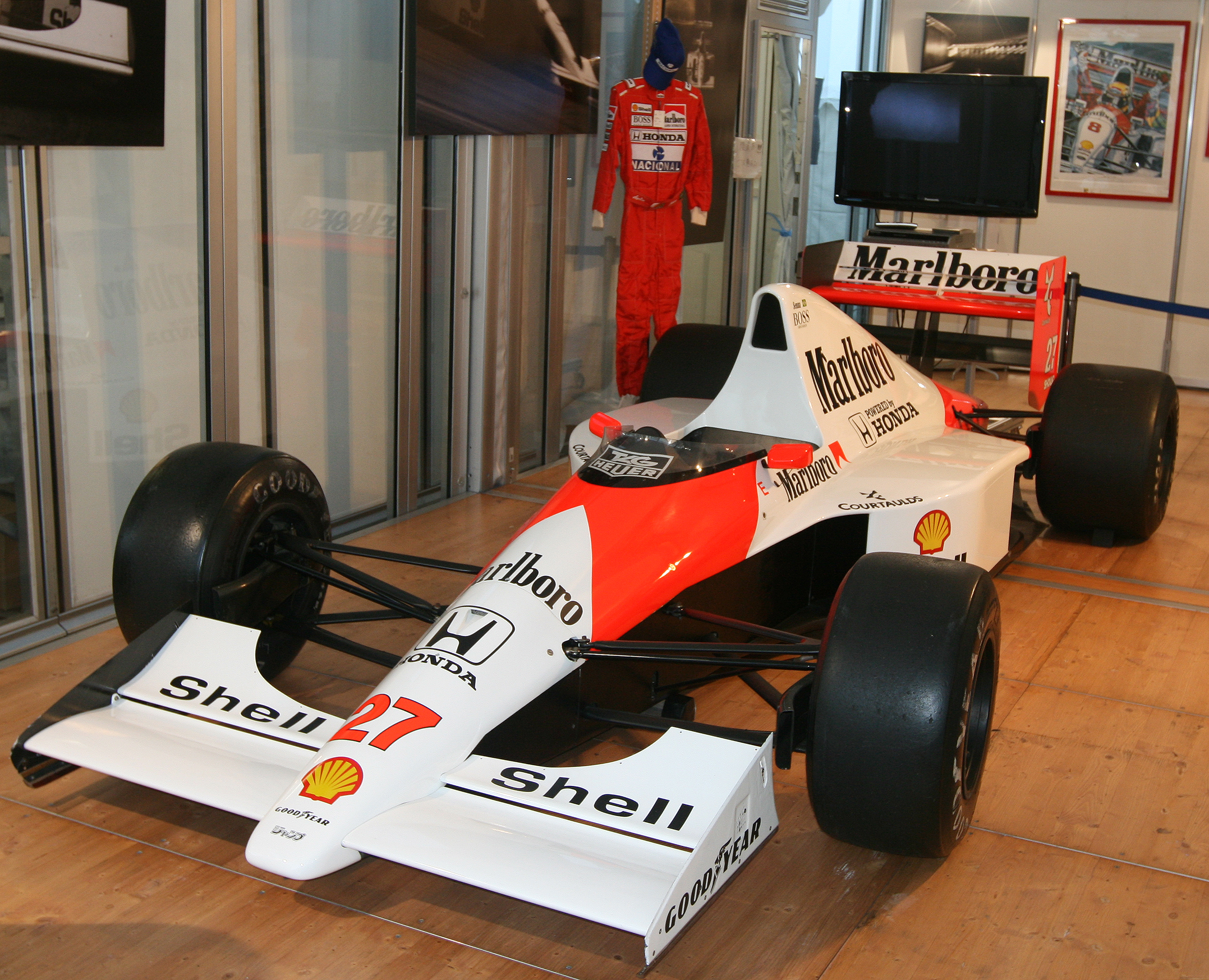
1990 McLaren MP4/5B

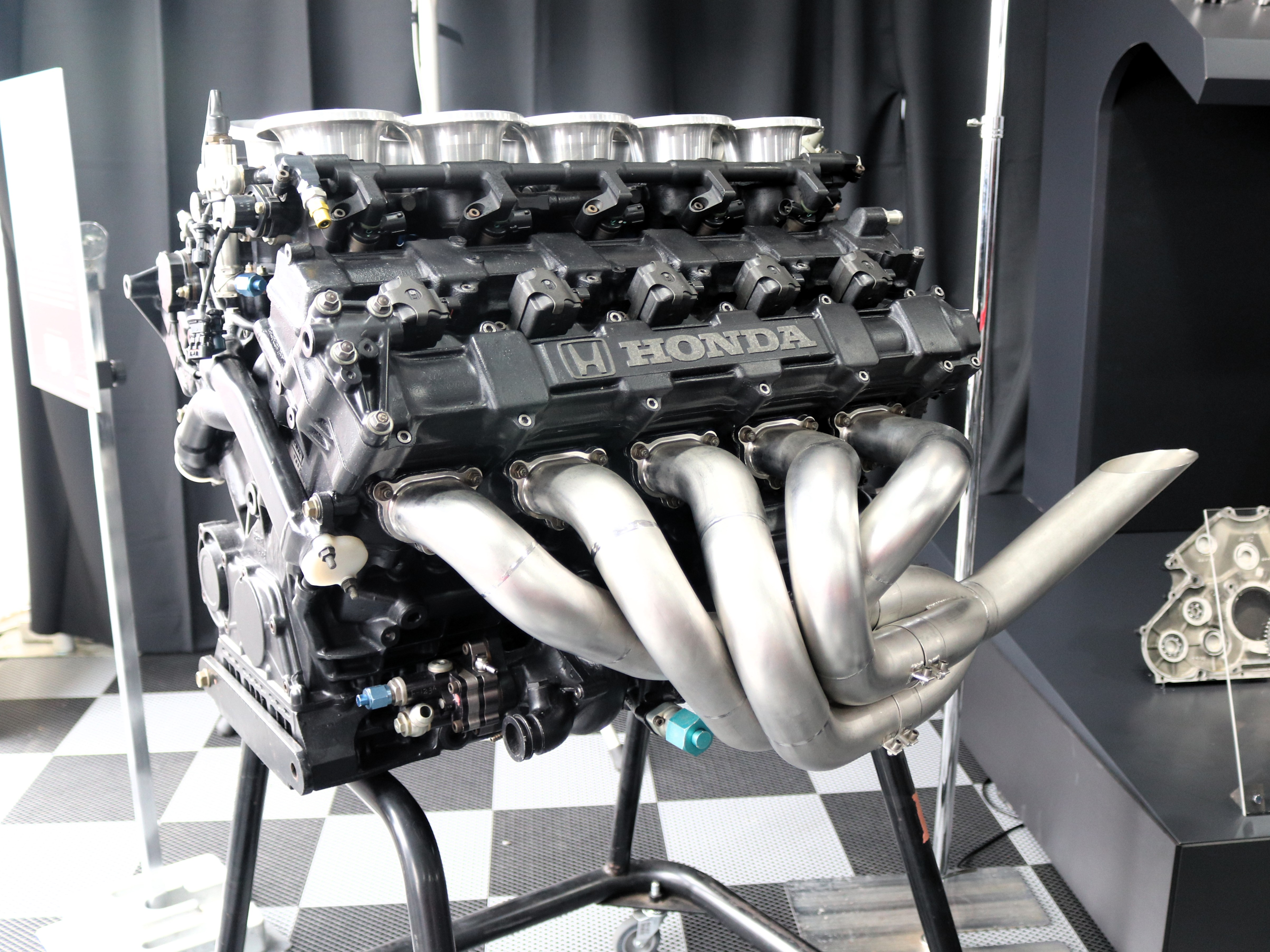
1990 Honda RA100E V10 engine

Prost went on to move to Ferrari for the 1990 season, as announced during the midseason of the previous year, taking designer Steve Nichols with him. The Frenchman was unhappy because he believed that McLaren and Honda were favouring Senna.

As a result, Ferrari and McLaren swapped car numbers, giving Prost and teammate Nigel Mansell the numbers 1 and 2, and giving Senna and Gerhard Berger, who had swapped with Prost at Ferrari, the numbers 27 and 28.

For the 1990 version of the car, designated MP4/5B, Oatley and his team redesigned the front and rear wings, and reprofiled the rear bodywork around larger radiators, and several all-new venturi tunnels were put on the rear floor of the car. The engine was tweaked by Honda, and Senna did much development work to ensure he would have better reliability in the new season. He and Berger took the fight to Prost and Mansell in 1990, winning another six races and winning the Constructors' Championship. The McLaren proved to have an outright speed advantage in qualifying and was notable for the number of times both cars were on the front row, particularly at power circuits such as Hockenheim and Imola. The car appeared to struggle slightly against the Ferrari 641s in the races themselves, particularly on heavy fuel loads with the Ferraris' race pace almost negating the McLarens' qualifying supremacy.

It was in that year's race at the Japanese Grand Prix when Senna and Prost collided in the first corner of the first lap, giving Senna the championship due to Prost being unable to continue.

Gordon Murray, the famed South African designer who had previously worked at Brabham since 1969, had designed championship-winning cars for the team and joined McLaren in 1987, retired from Formula One after his work on this car. He went to work on McLaren's road car project.

There was a test mule during the 1990 season created by McLaren called MP4/5C for Honda's new V12 engine that was to be used by the Woking outfit for the following two seasons. This car, driven by the team's test driver Allan McNish, made its public on-track debut at a 3-day test session held at Silverstone the week before the 1990 French Grand Prix. While McNish did not push the car to its limits, the V12 impressed with its reliability at such an early stage of development.

== In popular culture ==
Senna's MP4/5B was included in the 2001 video game Gran Turismo 3 under the alias "F090/S", but only in the Japanese and American versions. It was the least powerful F1 car in the game producing 700 PS (690 hp). It could be won by winning the Super Speedway endurance, the Grand Valley 300 km Endurance, the Dream Car Championship in Professional league, or by winning Formula GT. It is a random prize car in all four series.

The McLaren MP4/5B was featured in the Codemasters video game F1 2019 as downloadable content for the "Legends Edition" and for free in F1 2020, it was also featured in Automobilista 2 in the 'Brazilian Racing Legends Pack Pt1' DLC.

The McLaren MP4/5B also was sponsored by Weekly Shōnen Jump (in Japanese: 週刊少年ジャンプ) during 1990 season. To celebrate this partnership, Akira Toriyama (writer of Dragon Ball manga series) made a promotional drawing featuring Goku, Bulma and Gohan in Senna's car number 27. Toriyama also made 2 original manga comics inspired by this sponsorship, called GP Boy (グランプリ ボーイ) and The Flash of F1: Ayrton Senna's Challenge (Fの閃光-アイルトン・セナの挑戦), as the last one is a biographical manga about the Brazilian driver's career.

== Other events ==
Seven-time Formula One World Champion and ex-McLaren driver Lewis Hamilton drove Ayrton Senna's McLaren MP4/5B at Senna’s home track of Interlagos ahead of the 2024 São Paulo Grand Prix.

== Complete Formula One results ==
(key) (results shown in bold indicate pole position; results in italics indicate fastest lap)

Year	Entrant	Chassis	Engine	Tyres	Driver	1	2	3	4	5	6	7	8	9	10	11	12	13	14	15	16	Pts.	WCC
1989	Honda Marlboro McLaren	MP4/5	Honda RA109E; V10	G		BRA	SMR	MON	MEX	USA	CAN	FRA	GBR	GER	HUN	BEL	ITA	POR	ESP	JPN	AUS	141	1st
1989	Honda Marlboro McLaren	MP4/5	Honda RA109E; V10	G	(Brazil) Ayrton Senna	**11**	**1**	**1**	**1**	**Ret**	7	Ret	**Ret**	**1**	2	**1**	**Ret**	**Ret**	**1**	**DSQ**	**Ret**	141	1st
1989	Honda Marlboro McLaren	MP4/5	Honda RA109E; V10	G	(France) Alain Prost	2	2	2	5	1	**Ret**	**1**	1	2	4	2	1	2	3	Ret	Ret	141	1st
1990	Honda Marlboro McLaren	MP4/5B	Honda RA100E; V10	G		USA	BRA	SMR	MON	CAN	MEX	FRA	GBR	GER	HUN	BEL	ITA	POR	ESP	JPN	AUS	121	1st
1990	Honda Marlboro McLaren	MP4/5B	Honda RA100E; V10	G	(Brazil) Ayrton Senna	1	**3**	**Ret**	**1**	**1**	20	3	3	**1**	2	**1**	**1**	2	**Ret**	**Ret**	**Ret**	121	1st
1990	Honda Marlboro McLaren	MP4/5B	Honda RA100E; V10	G	(Austria) Gerhard Berger	**Ret**	2	2	3	4	**3**	5	14	3	16	3	3	4	Ret	Ret	4	121	1st
