= McLaren MP4/4 =

Formula One racing car

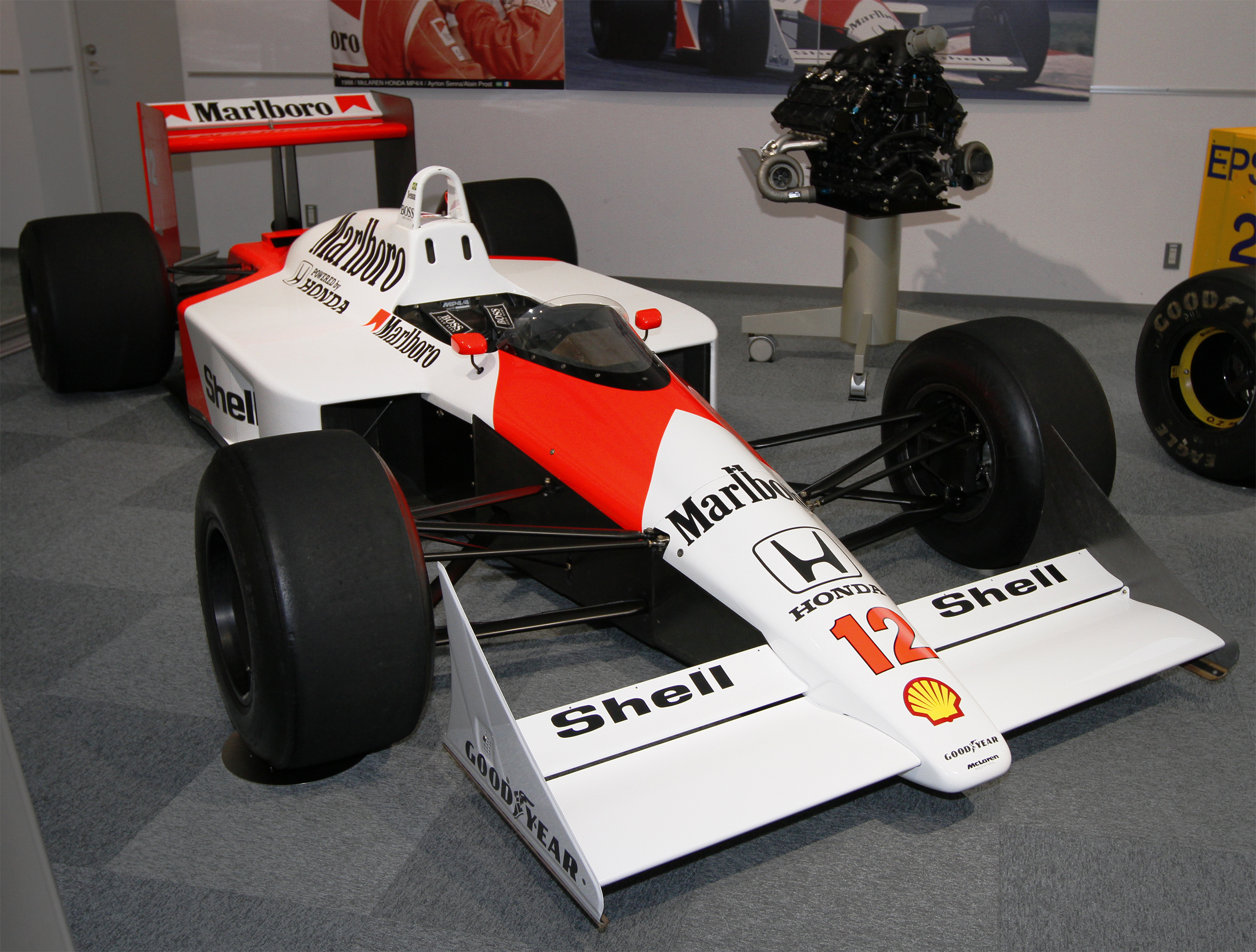
- The MP4/4 of Ayrton Senna at Honda Collection Hall in 2010
- Category: Formula One
- Constructor: McLaren (chassis); Honda (engine)
- Designers: Gordon Murray (Technical Director); Steve Nichols (Chief Designer, Lead Engineer); Matthew Jeffreys (Project Manager: Monocoque & front suspension); Bob Bell (Chief Aerodynamicist); Osamu Goto (Engine Technical Director (Honda)); Michio Kawamoto (Engine Designer (Honda))
- Predecessor: MP4/3
- Successor: MP4/5

Technical specifications
- Chassis: Carbon fibre honeycomb monocoque
- Suspension (front): Double wishbones, pull/push-rod actuated coil springs and dampers
- Suspension (rear): Double wishbones, rocker-arm actuated coil springs and dampers
- Axle track: Front: 1,824 mm (71.8 in); Rear: 1,670 mm (66 in)
- Wheelbase: 2,875 mm (113.2 in)
- Engine: Honda RA168E, 1,494 cc (91.2 cu in), 80° turbocharged V6 (2.5 Bar limited), mid-engine, longitudinally mounted
- Transmission: Weismann-McLaren 6-Speed manual
- Power: 675 hp (503 kW) @ 12,500 rpm 313 ft⋅lbf (424 N⋅m) @ 10,000 rpm
- Weight: 540 kg (1,190.5 lb)
- Fuel: Shell; Qualifying: 84%–16% Toluene / Methanol; Race: 60%–40% Toluene / Methanol
- Tyres: Goodyear

Competition history
- Notable entrants: Honda Marlboro McLaren
- Notable drivers: 11. (France) Alain Prost; 12. (Brazil) Ayrton Senna
- Debut: 1988 Brazilian Grand Prix
- First win: 1988 Brazilian Grand Prix
- Last win: 1988 Australian Grand Prix
- Last event: 1988 Australian Grand Prix
Races	Wins	Poles	F/Laps
16	15	15	10
- Constructors' Championships: 1 (1988)
- Drivers' Championships: 1 (1988, Ayrton Senna)

The McLaren MP4/4, also known as the McLaren-Honda MP4/4, was one of the most successful and dominant Formula One car designs of all time. Powered by Honda's RA168E 1.5-litre V6-turbo engine and driven by teammates Alain Prost and Ayrton Senna, the car competed during the 1988 Formula One season. The design of the car was led by American engineer Steve Nichols.

Honda had provided the Constructors' Championship-winning engines of 1986 and 1987, and for 1988 they switched partners from Williams to McLaren, who had struggled with their dated TAG-Porsche engines. The engine's design and development was led by Osamu Goto. The MP4/4 was a distinctly lower design than the previous year's MP4/3, forcing the drivers into a more reclined, almost lying down driving position.

In the 1988 season the MP4/4 won all but one race and claimed all but one pole position. The team won the year's constructors' title with about three times as many points as runners-up Ferrari. It holds the record for highest percentage of laps led in a season with 97.3% (1,003 out of 1,031). The car held the record for the highest win rate in a season until 2023, when the record was broken by the Red Bull Racing RB19, which was also powered by a Honda V6 turbocharged engine (95.45% win rate).

The McLaren MP4/4 was the last turbo-powered McLaren car to win the World Constructors' Championship title until the Mercedes-powered McLaren MCL38 won in the 2024 season.

== Background ==
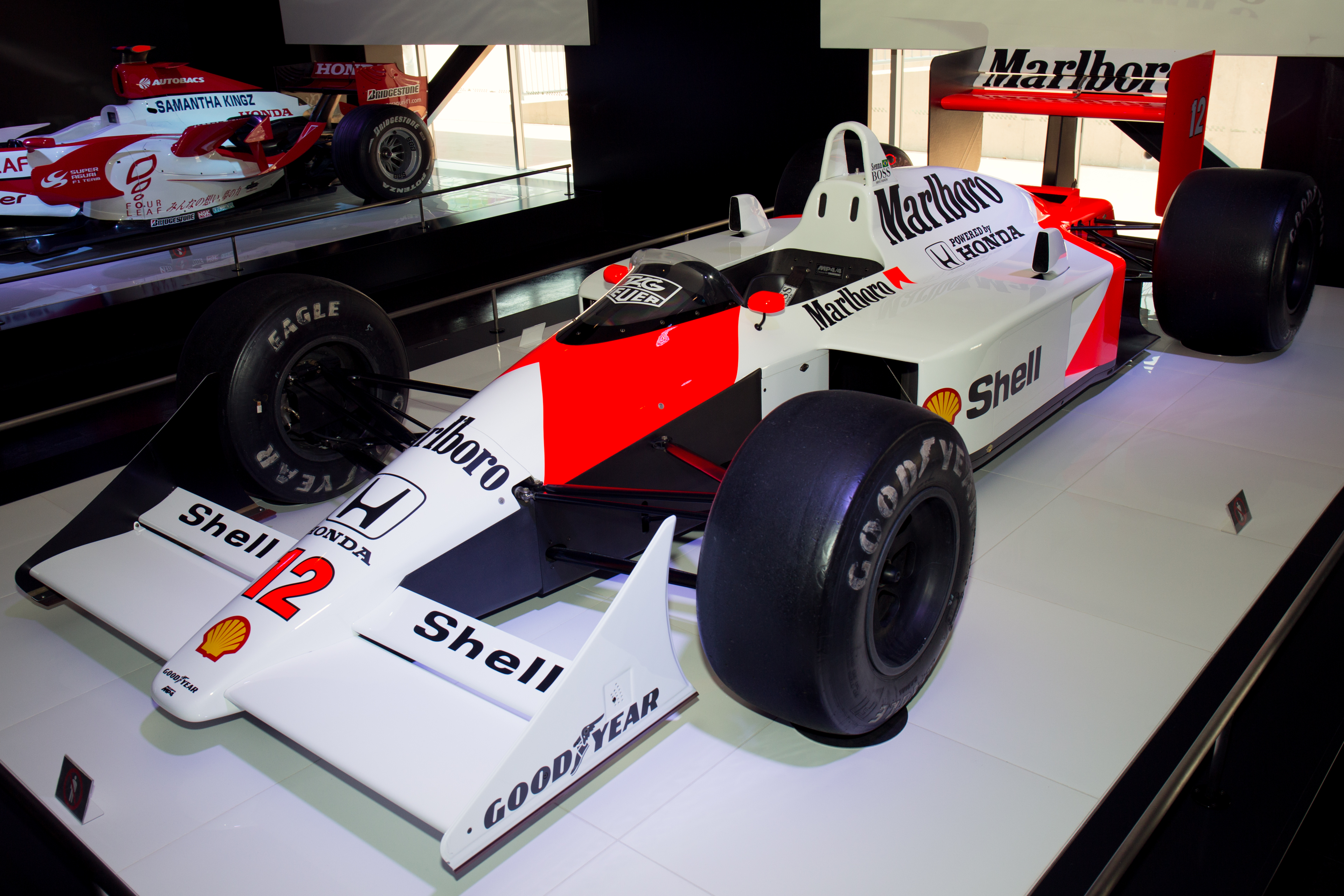
The MP4/4 and the Honda RA168E engine

In 1987, it had become increasingly difficult for McLaren to compete with major manufacturer-backed teams using, effectively, a privateer engine financed in-house by TAG and built by Porsche. For the following year, 1988, McLaren secured the use of the 1.5L V6 Honda turbo engines which since the middle of the 1985 season had been the best engine in Formula One. Team boss Ron Dennis had previously tried to secure Honda engines for his Formula 2 team, and, after four successful years with the TAG engines, welcomed the Japanese company. Most teams were making a concerted effort to establish themselves with naturally aspirated cars in 1988 because it was due to be the last year for the turbo engines before they were banned.

It was a transition year prior to a naturally aspirated-only formula in 1989, and the regulations were framed to reward those teams that had already made the switch. The decision to continue with a turbo engine put the McLaren team at a potential disadvantage. Over a race distance, the MP4/4 would suffer a significant power deficit compared to its naturally aspirated rivals. It was possible to modulate the turbo boost, but with a fuel tank allowance of only 150 litres (naturally aspirated cars were unlimited) it meant that the team would have to go into extreme fuel conservation to get to the end of a race.

Although there was speculation that Honda would introduce their V10 engine during 1988, Ron Dennis confirmed during qualifying for the Italian Grand Prix at Monza that racing the V10 was never part of the plan for 1988. By keeping the V6 engine, Honda and McLaren also gave themselves more development time on the 1989 car, which was to be an evolution of the MP4/4.

The sleek-looking, all-new MP4/4 was produced and first appeared early in 1988. It was one of the few competing cars that year that was an all-new car; Ferrari, Lotus, Arrows, Tyrrell, and others were using updated or developed versions of their previous year's cars in order to build new cars for the 1989 season.

== Team performance ==
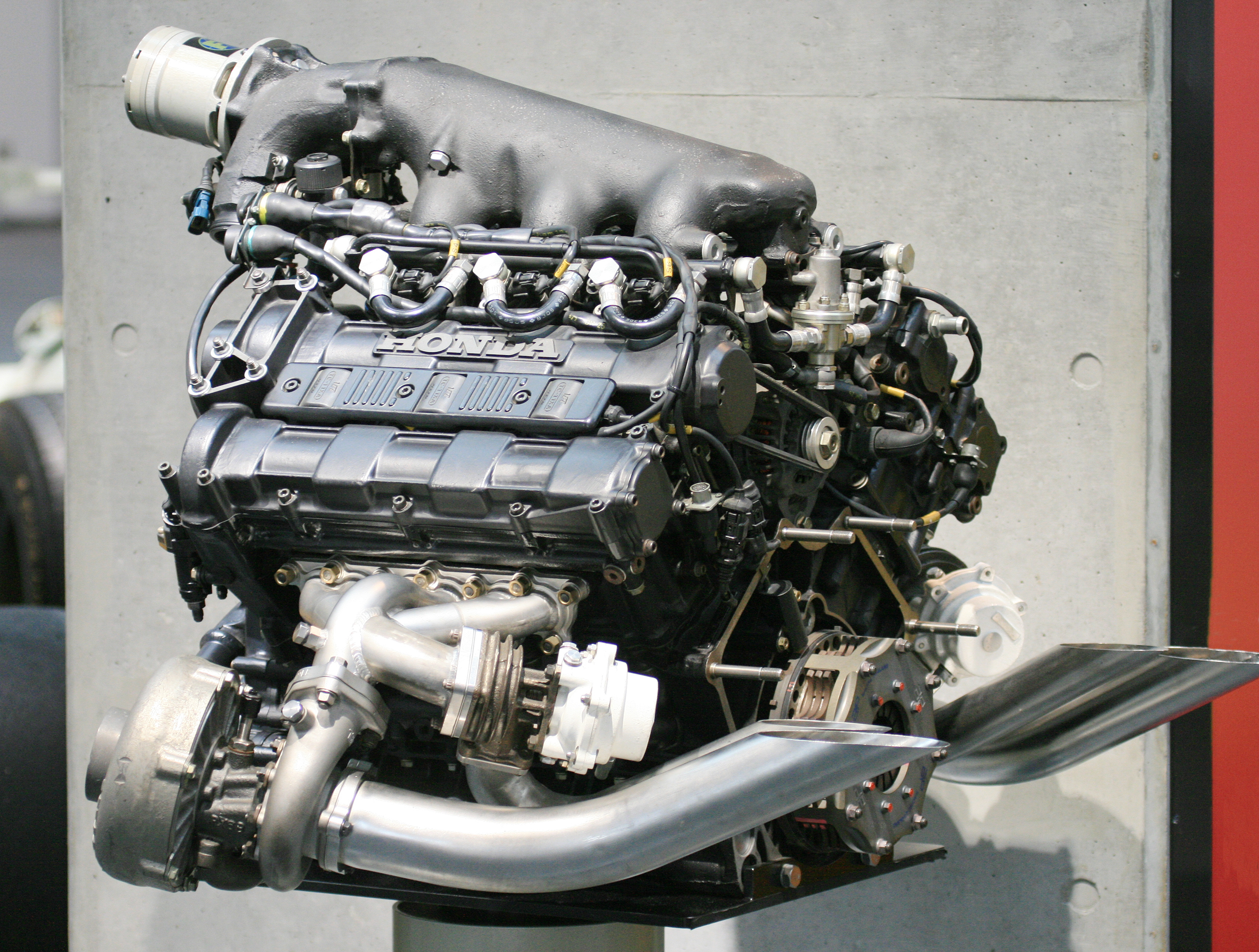
The Honda RA168E V6 turbo used in the MP4/4

For 1988 Ayrton Senna was signed to partner Alain Prost (at Prost's suggestion) on a three-year contract. The McLaren chassis, the Senna and Prost pairing, and finally the new Honda RA168E engines with 685 bhp (511 kW; 695 PS), looked like a formidable combination. However, there were concerns after the FIA introduced a fuel regulation for the turbo-powered cars of 150 litres for a race distance. Honda's engine management team worked feverishly on the fuel consumption of the RA168E which was specially built for the reduction in turbo boost from 4.0 bar to 2.5 bar rather than upgrading the 1987 spec engine, trying to improve it in order to avoid embarrassing late-race retirements. The car appeared 'as-is' through the season, save for a few aerodynamic revisions. The car arrived at the first race in Brazil with very little pre-season testing at Imola only a week before the race, but Senna was able to put the car on pole position by half a second from surprise second-place qualifier, Nigel Mansell driving the 600 bhp (447 kW; 608 PS) naturally aspirated Williams-Judd V8, with Prost qualifying third after not finding the balance of his car until the race morning warmup session.

One feature of the MP4/4 was the driver's position. Due to the car's low-slung aerodynamics and the FIA safety rule which stated that the top of a driver's helmet had to be below an imaginary straight line drawn from the top of the roll bar to the top of the cowling, the drivers were required to be in a reclining position rather than in the conventional upright seating position of rival contemporary Grand Prix cars. As the MP4/4 was a new car, it had to conform to FISA's new-for-1988 safety regulations which stipulated that the driver's feet be behind the line of an imaginary front axle. Teams running cars from the previous season were able to continue to do so under the earlier regulations for which they had been designed.

Before 1988, the most dominant car seen in a single season of F1 had been McLaren's 1984 car, the John Barnard designed MP4/2 which had won 12 of the 16 races that year driven by Prost and World Champion Niki Lauda (Lauda had defeated Prost in the Drivers' Championship by only half a point). However, the MP4/4's successes eclipsed the MP4/2 not only in wins but in qualifying performance. 1988 was almost a walkover for McLaren, who took 15 victories from 16 races, including ten 1-2 finishes, while Prost finished 1st or 2nd in the 14 races he finished (he had 2 retirements - Britain and Italy). The car also sat on pole position in 15 of the 16 races (including a record 13 poles for Senna), locked out the front row in 12 races, and also set 10 fastest race laps. The dominant run was only interrupted once, at the Italian Grand Prix at Monza for Round 12, when Senna crashed out of the lead with only two laps remaining while lapping Jean-Louis Schlesser, who was making his first and only F1 start for Williams in place of Mansell who was suffering from chickenpox. With Prost already out after a rare engine failure, Gerhard Berger claimed an emotional victory for Ferrari just a month after the death of Ferrari founder Enzo Ferrari.

Perhaps the most telling example of the MP4/4's emphatic domination was seen at San Marino in just the second race of the season. Senna and Prost both qualified the 5.040 km (3.131 mi) Imola circuit in the 1:27s (Senna 0.7 faster than Prost) while no other driver could get below 1:30. Third on the grid was defending World Champion Nelson Piquet in his Lotus 100T, which used the same 1988 specification Honda engines as McLaren. Piquet could only qualify in 1:30.500, 3.352 seconds slower than Senna, and 2.581 seconds slower than Prost. The Lotus actually recorded faster speed trap figures (302 km/h (188 mph), 1.5 km/h faster than the McLarens) on the run to Tosa, but around the rest of the circuit the McLaren's acceleration and downforce were unmatched. Despite this, both Piquet and Lotus boss Peter Warr told the assembled media at Imola that they believed their car to be better aerodynamically, and therefore more fuel-efficient than the MP4/4. However, both McLarens had lapped the entire field, including 3rd placed Piquet, by lap 55 of the 60 lap race. The fast Imola circuit with its long periods of full-throttle racing was notoriously hard on fuel, especially for the turbo cars which had seen numerous late race retirements in recent years, and the McLarens lapping the field at the speed they did prove the aerodynamic efficiency of the car as well as the work Honda had undertaken to reduce fuel consumption. Prost and Senna's fastest laps (again the only drivers under 1:30) were 1.5 seconds faster than the next fastest, Gerhard Berger's Ferrari. Piquet's fastest lap was only the ninth fastest of the race, and some 2.8 seconds slower than Prost's fastest lap of 1:29.685. Both Prost and Senna lapped faster in the race than Piquet had qualified, putting an exclamation mark on McLaren's dominant weekend.

The car retired only four times in the season - with Prost retiring at Silverstone during a very wet British Grand Prix (handling), and at Monza for the Italian Grand Prix (engine, the only in race engine failure McLaren suffered all season), along with Senna's infamous accidents at Monaco (where he totally dominated qualifying and by lap 66 of the race had built a 50-second lead over Prost who had been stuck for 54 laps behind Berger, only to throw it away by crashing into the barriers at Portier. As he lived in Monaco, Senna went back to his home and did not contact the team until that night when he finally returned to the pits as the team was packing up, such was his disappointment), and Monza. Monaco was another example of McLaren's domination, Senna qualified 1.4 seconds faster than acknowledged Monaco master Prost, who himself was 1.2 seconds faster than third-placed Gerhard Berger in his Ferrari.

During the season both McLarens qualified for a race over one second faster than the rest of the field on six occasions (San Marino, Monaco, Germany, Portugal, Japan and Australia), while the team achieved 15 pole positions (13 for Senna and 2 for Prost) to go along with the 15 wins. Only Gerhard Berger's pole position at Silverstone prevented a perfect pole record for McLaren. Britain was the only race where neither McLaren qualified on the front row with Ferrari's Michele Alboreto qualifying 2nd, Senna, and Prost occupying the 2nd row. Britain was also the only race of the season that Ayrton Senna didn't qualify his McLaren-Honda on the front row of the grid. Prost failed to qualify on the front row four times during the season (Brazil, Detroit, Britain and Hungary). Hungary saw the worst qualifying position for a McLaren in 1988 when Prost was only 7th fastest. Senna, as usual, was on pole at the tight Hungaroring, though only 0.108 in front of Nigel Mansell's Williams-Judd. Other than at Silverstone, this was the closest any car got to knocking one of the MP4/4's off pole position.

It was during qualifying at Hockenheim in Germany, the MP4/4 set its top speed record, and the fastest speed trap of the 1988 season when both Senna and Prost achieved 333 km/h (207 mph) on the 1.6 km long straight that took the cars into the forest (they had recorded 330 km/h (205 mph) during qualifying for Round 4 in Mexico at the Autódromo Hermanos Rodríguez on its 1.2 km (0.75 mi) long front straight). Both speeds compared favourably to the fastest non-McLaren, the Ferrari of Berger who trapped at 328 km/h (204 mph) at Hockenheim, and the fastest of the non-turbos, the slippery, Adrian Newey designed March-Judd of Maurício Gugelmin which was trapped at 312 km/h (194 mph), also in Germany. However, with the reduction in engine power from the levels of 1986 and 1987, the McLaren-Honda's top speed was 19 km/h (12 mph) slower than the fastest speed of 1987 (Nelson Piquet in a Williams-Honda at Monza), and 18 km/h (11 mph) slower than had been achieved in 1986 (Gerhard Berger in a Benetton-BMW, also at Monza).

At Silverstone, McLaren introduced revised aerodynamics to the MP4/4, doing away with the turbo "snorkels" (which force-fed air to the turbos) located on the top of the side pods. While this proved troublesome on the first day of qualifying, with both drivers feeling it created an imbalance in the cars, and the snorkels re-introduced for the rest of the British GP weekend, it was the last time the snorkels were seen on the MP4/4s for the rest of the season, as testing at Silverstone the week after the British Grand Prix had shown the imbalance was caused by incorrect suspension settings on the cars and not by the removal of the snorkels. Team boss Ron Dennis estimated that the research and development on the revised aerodynamics had cost the team somewhere around £150,000 for something that even Steven Nichols considered a minimal aerodynamic gain and gave no extra horsepower to the Honda engine.

Nichols also dispelled the myth that somehow Honda had managed to get around the FIA's pop-off valves and that their engines in the McLarens somehow had around 100 bhp (75 kW; 101 PS) more horsepower than the often quoted 650 bhp (485 kW; 659 PS). As he pointed out, there was no getting around the fact that the cars could only carry 150 litres of fuel per race and the alleged extra horsepower would have meant not finishing on the allowable fuel, plus winning made the MP4/4's an obvious target of the FISA scrutineers who meticulously checked and re-checked the size of each cars fuel tank after every race. Senna's Chief Mechanic in 1988, Neil Trundle, also confirmed that the Honda engines basically ran on what was generally termed "Rocket Fuel" or "Jungle Juice" that was supplied by team sponsors Shell, with the fuel consisting of a special blend made up of around 84% toluene / 16% methanol for qualifying and around 60-40 toluene/methanol for racing.

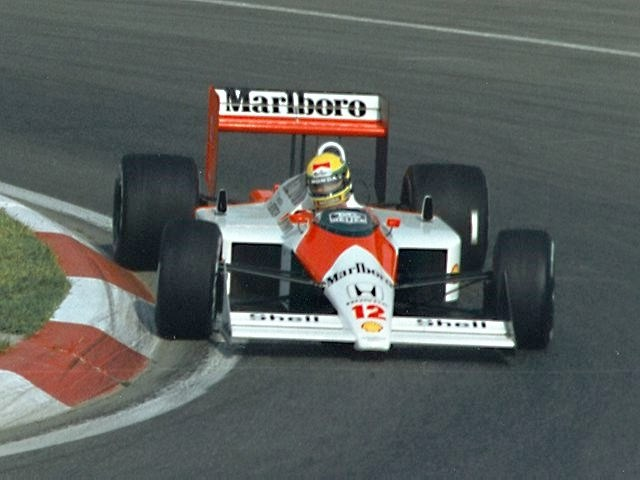
Senna driving the MP4/4 at the 1988 Canadian Grand Prix.

Other than the four retirements, the lowest finishing position for the MP4/4 was a 6th in Round 13 in Portugal, and 4th in the next race in Spain, with both recorded by Senna. During both races, his car was hampered by fuel readout problems which forced him to run slower than he otherwise could have in order to have enough fuel to finish. Both races were won by Alain Prost. Those lower finishing places in the top 6 actually helped Senna's championship position as, under the Best 11 Scores rule, he could drop both whereas Prost, who only ever finished 1st or 2nd in the 14 races he finished, had to drop three of his 2nd-place finishes.

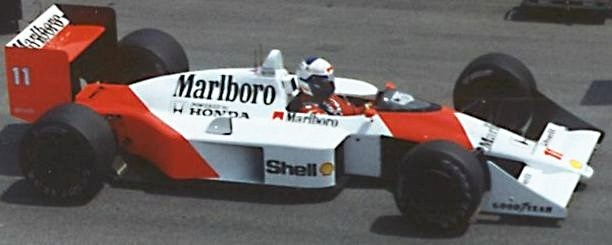
Alain Prost driving the MP4/4 at the 1988 Canadian GP.

At the end of the season, McLaren-Honda had taken both the Constructors and Drivers' titles (Senna edging out Prost due to winning more races - only the eleven best results counted, so even though Prost scored more overall points, Senna's 8 first-place finishes to Prost's 7, meant Senna took the championship title.) McLaren-Honda, who scored a then-record 199 points in the Constructors Championship, wrapped up the Constructors title with a 1-2 finish in Belgium for Round 11 of the 16 race season, it was the team's eighth 1-2 finish of the season (Senna and Prost would finish 1-2 twice more, in Japan and Australia). The team finished the season a massive 134 points in front of 2nd placed Ferrari.

The MP4/4 would be succeeded by the Honda V10 powered McLaren MP4/5 in 1989. Although statistically not as successful as the MP4/4 (more because others such as Ferrari, Williams and Benetton improved rather than McLaren and Honda faltered), the 1989 car would give the team another Constructors Championship, with Prost and Senna finishing 1–2 in the Drivers' Championship.

A modified car, the MP4/4B, was used as a test mule for Honda's new 3.5-litre V10 designed around the new regulations for the 1989 season banning turbocharged engines. According to some McLaren personnel at the time including Steve Nichols, front end designer Matthew Jeffreys and Chief Mechanic Neil Trundle, the test mule was actually faster and arguably a better car than 1989 and 1990's highly successful MP4/5 and MP4/5B designed by Neil Oatley, cars that brought the team 2 Drivers' Championships, 2 Constructors' championships, 16 wins, 27 poles, 12 fastest laps and 36 overall podium finishes from the 32 races ran over those two years.

== Acceleration data ==
According to the January 1989 issue of Sport Auto, the McLaren MP4/4 had the following acceleration data:

0 - 40 kph	1.3 s
0 - 50 kph	1.5 s
0 - 60 kph	1.8 s
0 - 70 kph	2.0 s
0 - 80 kph	2.3 s
0 - 90 kph	2.6 s
0 - 100 kph	2.8 s
0 - 120 kph	3.3 s
0 - 140 kph	3.9 s
0 - 150 kph	4.2 s
0 - 160 kph	4.4 s
0 - 180 kph	5.0 s
0 - 200 kph	5.6 s

== Other ==
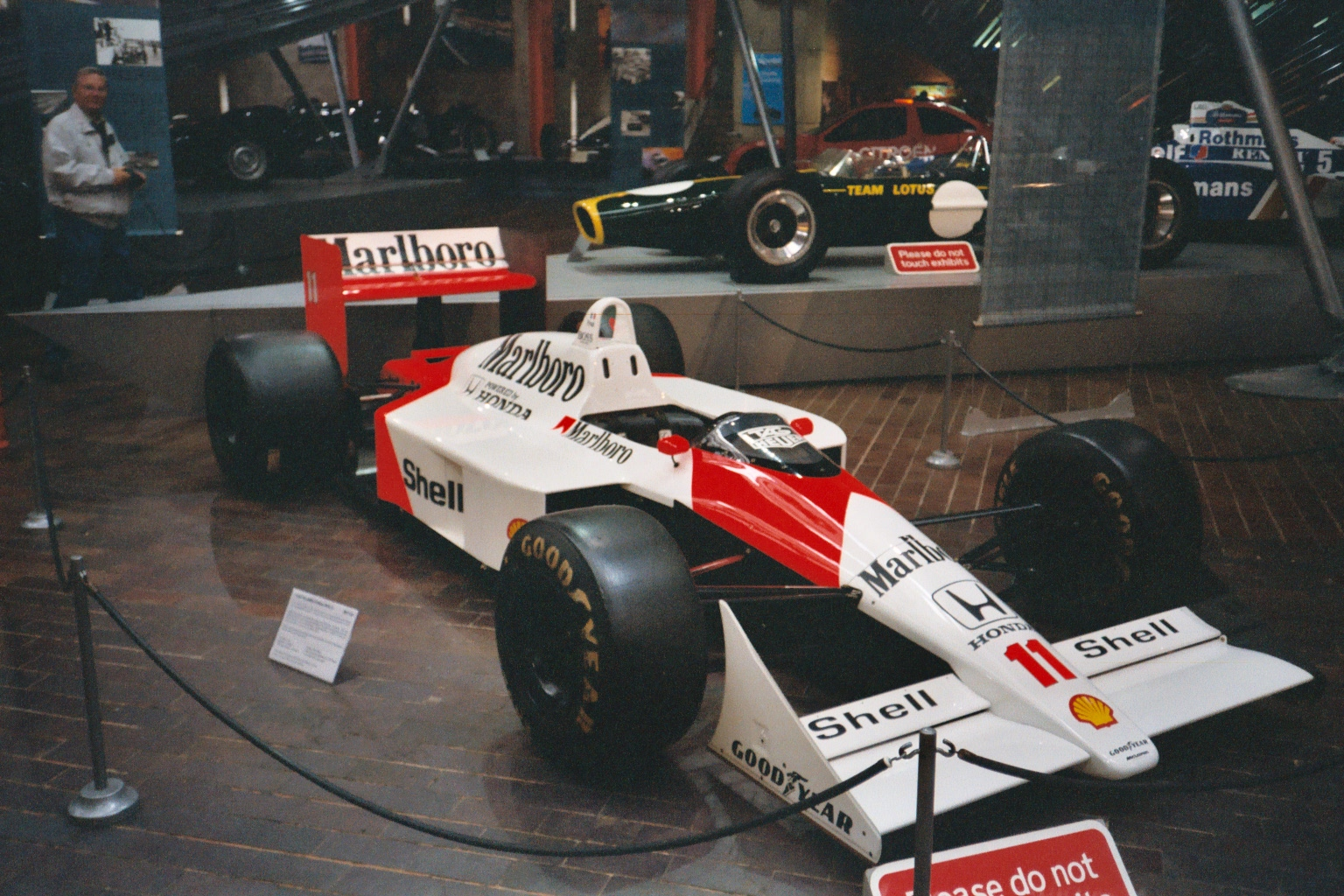
Alain Prost's McLaren-Honda MP4/4

The MP4/4 was voted the greatest Formula One car of all time by a panel of Formula One engineers and designers. It was also voted greatest race car of the 20th century by Autosport readers.

Steve Nichols has said that he was honoured to lead the McLaren design team including Matthew Jeffreys, Dave North, Bob Bell, Hugh Moran, Dave Neilson, Tim Wright, Colin Smith, Mike Lock, and Paul Merrit. He thought that the MP4/4 was the culmination of all the experience and effort of all the McLaren people who worked so hard to design, produce and race this car and that it was the perfect validation of the concept of teamwork.

Senna's MP4/4 was included in the 2001 video game Gran Turismo 3 under the aliases "F688/S" (Japanese and American NTSC-J/NTSC-U/C versions) and "Polyphony002" (European PAL version). The MP4/4 in its actual, licensed version would later reappear in Gran Turismo 7, as part of the 1.20 update.

The MP4/4 is one of three car choices in the 1988 Accolade video game Grand Prix Circuit.

The MP4/4 was released as downloadable content in Forza Motorsport 6.

In F1 2017 the MP4/4 is available as a classic Formula One car in the "Special Edition" of the game or as downloadable content. It is available for free in the following F1 2018, F1 2019 and F1 2020.

The MP4/4 has been added to the mobile game Real Racing 3 Version 6.0 by Firemonkeys, an EA Studio in December 2017. The game is available for Apple iOS devices, Android Devices, Nvidia Shield, and Amazon.com Kindle Fire.

The MP4/4 has a Lego Icons set made of it (set no.10330), released on 1 March 2024. The set also includes an Ayrton Senna minifigure.

== Chassis log ==
=== Overview ===
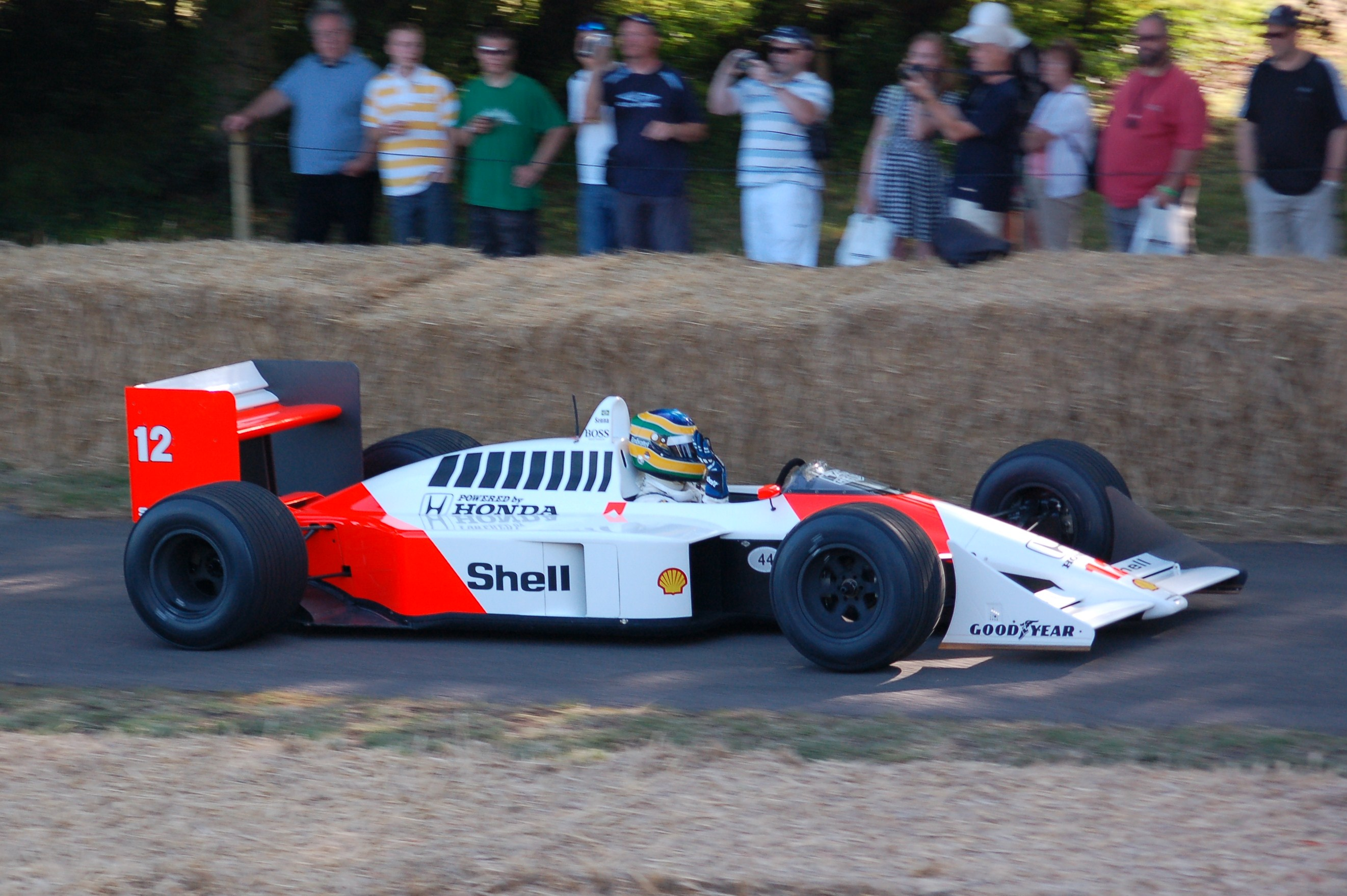
Bruno Senna demonstrating chassis MP4/4-06 at the Goodwood Festival of Speed, 2009.

For the 1988 season, six MP4/4 cars were moulded from carbon fibre with assistance from Hercules Aerospace. The chassis numbers 1 through 6 were used throughout the year.

All six MP4/4 chassis still exist, with chassis #1 and #6 being still owned by the McLaren Group. Chassis #1 is usually on display at the McLaren Technology Centre and was driven by Sergio Pérez at the Goodwood Festival of Speed in 2013. It was also displayed at Goodwood for McLaren's 60th anniversary in 2024. Chassis #6 has been displayed at the National Motor Museum, Beaulieu (UK) in the Prost livery, and was driven by Bruno Senna at Goodwood in 2009 in the Senna livery.

Chassis #2 is owned by a private collector in Chicago, Illinois, USA, and has been on display at McLaren of Chicago after being driven by Bruno Senna at Interlagos in 2019. Chassis #3 was previously on loan and displayed at the Donington Grand Prix Exhibition, but was relocated and displayed at McLaren Osaka Hakko. It was relocated again to Museo y Circuito Fernando Alonso in Asturias, Spain by 2016. As of 2022, it was in private ownership in the UK at Kiklo Spaces. Chassis #4 was on display at McLaren Auckland, New Zealand, for a number of years, but it was returned to the factory in Woking. As of 2025, it was owned by Nicholas and Shelley Schorsch as part of their Audrain Collection based at Newport, Rhode Island, USA; it was also demonstrated by Prost at that year's Goodwood, for the 75th anniversary of the F1 World Championship.

Chassis #5 is owned by Honda and is sometimes on display at the Honda Collection Hall at Motegi; it ran at Goodwood in 2014 under Marlboro livery and driven by Takuya Izawa. Additionally, Honda owns a showcar, chassis MP4/4/SSC/10 (SSC for static show car), which is occasionally put on display including at the 2015 Tokyo Auto Salon and Honda Collection Hall.

=== Individual chassis ===
MP4/4	Six built (MP4/4-01–MP4/4-06)
MP4/4-01	This chassis won two races: Imola and Montreal (Canada) by Senna. Raced by Senna at Imola (San Marino), Monaco, and Mexico City (Mexico); was used as the spare car at Detroit (USA), Paul Ricard (France) and Silverstone (Britain), was initially the spare car at Hockenheim (Germany) but Prost raced this car there; was then used by Prost at Hungaroring (Hungary), Spa (Belgium) and Monza (Italy). Used by Senna to set pole position at Rio, but the car failed on the grid at the end of the formation lap; he used MP4/4-03 for the race instead. Was not used for testing.
MP4/4-02	This chassis won three races: Rio by Prost; and Detroit and Suzuka (Japan) by Senna. Senna won the Driver's Championship with this chassis at Suzuka. Was Prost's car in Rio and then the spare car at Imola, Monaco, Mexico City, Montreal, Hungaroring, Spa, Monza, Estoril (Portugal), Jerez (Spain) and Suzuka. Senna opted to use this chassis over MP4/4-05 at both Suzuka and Adelaide; Senna also used this chassis as his main car at Detroit. Prost used this chassis to set his grid time at Mexico City. Was used at the first pre-season test at Imola.
MP4/4-03	Primary test car; only MP4/4 not to win a GP. Was originally the spare car at Rio, arriving in pieces and needed assembling. Suffered a manufacturing fault when its carbon fibre nose delaminated during first practice with Prost at the wheel; McLaren's mechanics repaired the car at the track and it remained the spare car until Senna's main car, MP4/4-01, suffered gearstick failure (due to another unintentional manufacturing fault) on the grid at the end of the formation lap. MP4/4-03 was then raced in Rio by Senna before his disqualification for changing cars after the green flag for the formation lap.
MP4/4-04	This chassis was used exclusively by Prost, and he won three races with it: Monaco, Mexico City, & Paul Ricard. Also raced by Prost at San Marino, Canada, Detroit and Silverstone. Used by Prost to set grid time at Hockenheim, but he opted to use the spare MP4/4-01 for the race there. Was not used for testing.
MP4/4-05	This chassis was used exclusively by Senna, and he won four races with it: Silverstone, Hockenheim, Hungaroring and Spa. Used and made available to Senna for the remainder of the season; also raced at Monza, Estoril and Jerez by Senna. Was originally Senna's race car at Suzuka and Adelaide (Australia), but he opted to use MP4/4-02 for both races. Used by Senna to set pole position time at Adelaide. Was used in one test.
MP4/4-06	This chassis was used exclusively by Prost, and he won three races with it: Estoril, Jerez, & Adelaide. Was first introduced at Estoril. Was not used in any tests.

== Complete Formula One results ==
(key)(results in bold indicate pole position, results in italics indicate fastest lap)

Year	Entrant	Engine	Tyres	Drivers	1	2	3	4	5	6	7	8	9	10	11	12	13	14	15	16	Pts.	WCC
1988	Honda Marlboro McLaren	Honda RA168E; V6-tc	**G**		BRA	SMR	MON	MEX	CAN	DET	FRA	GBR	GER	HUN	BEL	ITA	POR	ESP	JPN	AUS	**199**	**1st**
1988	Honda Marlboro McLaren	Honda RA168E; V6-tc	**G**	Alain Prost	1	2	1	1	2	2	**1**	Ret	2	2	2	Ret	**1**	1	2	1	**199**	**1st**
1988	Honda Marlboro McLaren	Honda RA168E; V6-tc	**G**	Ayrton Senna	**DSQ**	**1**	**Ret**	**2**	**1**	**1**	2	1	**1**	**1**	**1**	**10**	6	**4**	**1**	**2**	**199**	**1st**

== See also ==
1988 McLaren-Honda MP4/4
1988 McLaren-Honda MP4/4 driven by Bruno Senna at Goodwood Festival of Speed 2009

- Team McLaren
- Honda Racing F1
- Ron Dennis
- Steve Nichols
- 1988 Formula One season

== Bibliography ==
- Bamsey, Ian (1990). McLaren Honda Turbo: A Technical Appraisal. Foulis motoring book series. Sparkford, Somerset, England; Newbury Park, CA, USA: Haynes Publishing. ISBN 0854298401.
- Clarke, Adrian (9 January 2024). "The McLaren MP4/4 Wasn't The Greatest Formula One Car Of All Time, It Just Had No Competition". The Autopian.
- Elson, James (4 August 2021). "'I'm sick of people living off my reputation', says Gordon Murray in McLaren MP4/4 row". Motor Sport.
- —————— (20 October 2021). "'Gordon Murray's living in a parallel universe' — McLaren designers hit back over MP4/4 claims". Motor Sport.
- —————— (21 December 2022). "'Ultimate expression of teamwork': how McLaren created the MP4/4". Motor Sport.
- Hamilton, Maurice (2 April 2018). "McLaren MP4/4: The launch of a legend". ESPN.com.
- Herbez, Vukašin (30 November 2015). "McLaren MP4/4 - Well Deserved Place in History of Formula 1 -". SnapLap.
- Jeffreys, Matthew (October 2021). "Letter". Motor Sport.
- Piola, Giorgio; Somerfield, Matt (4 April 2024). "The fascinating story behind McLaren's most iconic F1 car". Motorsport.com.
- Rendle, Steve (2018). McLaren MP4/4 1988 (all models) Owners' Workshop Manual: An insight into the design, engineering and operation of the most successful F1 car ever built. Haynes Service and Repair Manual Series. Sparkford, UK: Haynes Publishing. ISBN 9781785211379.
- Somerfield, Matthew (12 July 2025). "Greatest F1 car ever: What made the McLaren MP4-4 a near unstoppable beast". PlanetF1.
- Widdows, Rob (September 2021). "Gordon Murray: The Motor Sport Interview". Motor Sport.
- "Remembering The McLaren MP4/4: F1's Most Dominant Car". f1chronicle.com. 15 January 2021.
- The Concise Encyclopedia of Formula One (1998) by David Tremayne.

Awards
Preceded by Jaguar XJR-8	Autosport; Racing Car Of The Year; 1988	Succeeded by Sauber C9
