= Mercedes-Benz M106 engine =

Mercedes-Benz M106
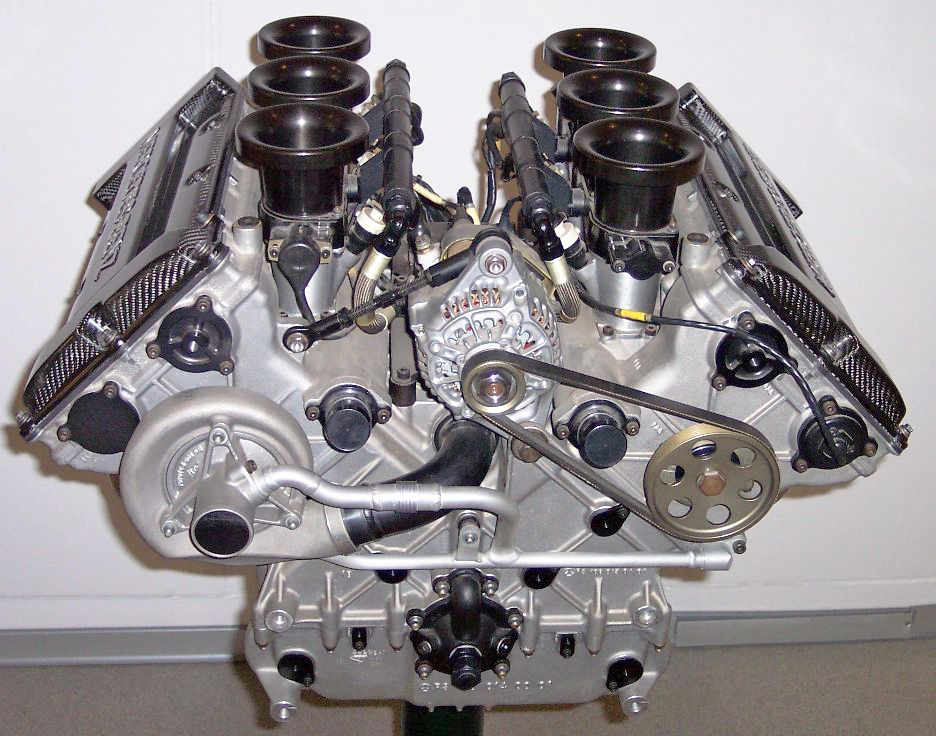

Overview
- Manufacturer: Mercedes-Benz
- Production: 1994-1996

Layout
- Configuration: Naturally aspirated 90° V6
- Displacement: 2.5 L (153 cu in)
- Cylinder bore: 92 mm (3.6 in)
- Piston stroke: 62.6 mm (2.46 in)
- Valvetrain: 24-valve, DOHC, four-valves per cylinder
- Compression ratio: 12.0:1

Combustion
- Turbocharger: No
- Fuel system: Fuel injection
- Oil system: Dry sump

Output
- Power output: 400–500 hp (298–373 kW)
- Torque output: 221 lb⋅ft (300 N⋅m)

Dimensions
- Dry weight: 110 kg (240 lb)

The Mercedes-Benz M106 engine is a high-revving, prototype, four-stroke, 2.5-liter, naturally aspirated, V6 racing engine, designed, developed and produced by Mercedes-Benz for the DTM and later ITC, between 1994 and 1996.

== History ==
The new M106 six-cylinder replaced the previous four-cylinder engine used in the Mercedes-Benz 190E during the past seasons. It is a brand-new V6 with a displacement of just under 2.5 liters. Very loosely based on the 4.2 liter V8 used in the E 420 and S 420 models, the new engine uses a cylinder bank V-angle of 90 degrees. Equipped with twin overhead camshafts and four valves per cylinder, the compact unit nevertheless only weighed 110 kg (240 lb) due to extensive use of alloys. Initially producing between 400–440 hp (300–330 kW), it drives the rear wheels via a six-speed sequential gearbox that was fitted at the rear of the car to improve the weight balance. While Alfa Romeo's model featured four driven wheels, Mercedes-Benz was restricted to only a rear-wheel drive setup for their new DTM racer, as none of the road-going C-Class models used four-wheel drive. The 1996 iteration of the engine developed over 500 hp (370 kW), and revved over 11,500 rpm.

== Applications ==
Mercedes-Benz C-Class DTM (W202)
