= V6 engine =

Piston engine with six cylinders in a "V" configuration

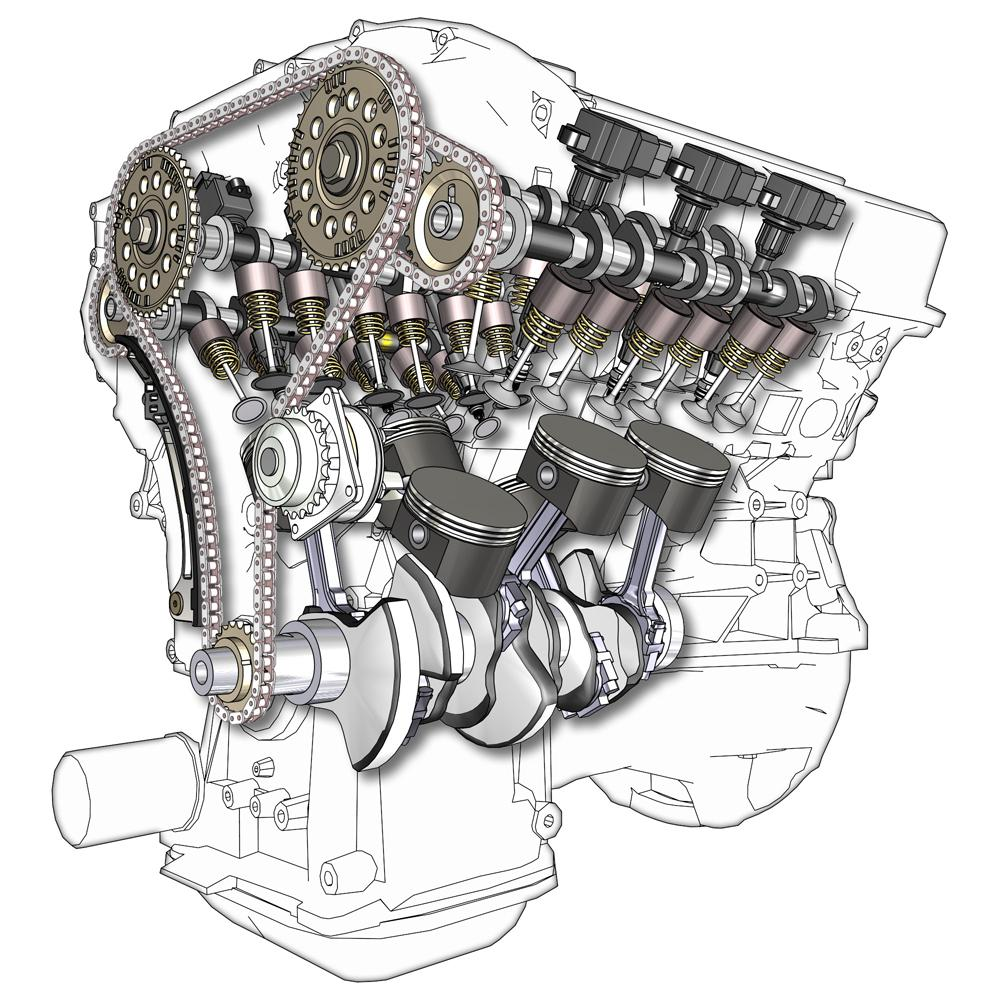
Cutaway view of a V6 engine with dual overhead camshafts (DOHC)

A typical DOHC V6 engine, represented in AngeTheGreat's Engine Simulator

A V6 engine is a six-cylinder piston engine where the cylinders and cylinder blocks share a common crankshaft and are arranged in a V configuration.

The first V6 engines were designed and produced independently by Marmon Motor Car Company, Deutz Gasmotoren Fabrik and Delahaye. Engines built after World War II include the Lancia V6 engine in 1950 for the Lancia Aurelia, and the Buick V6 engine in 1962 for the Buick Special. The V6 layout has become the most common layout for six-cylinder automotive engines.

== Design ==
Due to their short length, V6 engines are often used as the larger engine option for vehicles which are otherwise produced with inline-four engines, especially in transverse engine vehicles. A downside for luxury cars is that V6 engines produce more vibrations than straight-six engines. Some sports cars like the Porsche 911 use flat-six engines instead of V6 engines, due to their near perfect primary engine balance and lower centre of gravity (which improves the handling).

The displacement of modern V6 engines is typically between 2.5 and 4.0 L (153 and 244 cu in), though larger and smaller examples have been produced, such as the 1.8 L (110 cu in) Mazda V6 used in the 1991–1998 Mazda MX-3, or the 1.6 L (98 cu in) Mitsubishi V6 engine used in the 1992–1998 Mirage/Lancer, while the largest gasoline V6 built was the 7.8 L (478 cu in) GMC V6 used in the 1962 GMC C/K series 6500.

=== Balance and smoothness ===
All V6 engines with even firing spacing—regardless of the V-angle between the cylinder banks—are subject to a primary imbalance caused by each bank consisting of a straight-three engine, due to the odd number of cylinders in each bank. Straight-six engines and flat-six engines do not experience this imbalance. To reduce the vibrations caused by this imbalance, most V6 engines use a harmonic damper on the crankshaft and/or a counter-rotating balance shaft.

Six-cylinder designs have less pulsation in the power delivery than four-cylinder engines, due to the overlap in the power strokes of the six-cylinder engine. In a four-cylinder, four-stroke engine, only one piston is on a power stroke at any given time. Each piston comes to a complete stop and reverses direction before the next one starts its power stroke, which results in a gap between power strokes, especially at lower engine speeds (RPM). In a six-cylinder engine with an even firing interval, the next piston starts its power stroke 60° before the previous one finishes, which results in smoother delivery of power to the flywheel.

Comparing engines on a dynamometer, a V6 engine shows instantaneous torque peaks of 154% above mean torque and valleys of 139% below mean torque, with a small amount of negative torque (engine torque reversals) between power strokes. In the case of a four-cylinder engine, the peaks are approximately 270% above mean torque and 210% below mean torque, with 100% negative torque being delivered between strokes. However, a V6 with uneven firing intervals of 90° and 150° shows large torque variations of 185% above and 172% below mean torque.

=== Cylinder bank angles ===
==== 10 to 15 degrees ====
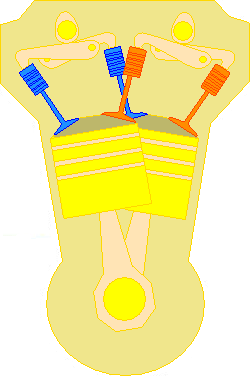
Cross-section of a VR6 engine

Since 1991, Volkswagen has produced narrow angle VR6 engines with V-angles of 10.5 and 15 degrees shared by both banks of cylinders, in a design similar to the 1922–1976 Lancia V4 engine. These engines use a single cylinder head so are technically a straight engine with the name "VR6" coming from the combination of German words "Verkürzt" and "Reihenmotor" meaning "shortened inline engine". The VR6 engines were used in transverse engine front-wheel drive cars which were originally designed for inline-four engines. Due to the minimal extra length and width of the VR6 engine, it could be fitted to the engine compartments relatively easily, in order to provide a displacement increase of 60 percent .

Since there is no room in the V between the cylinder banks for an intake system, all the intakes are on one side of the engine, and all the exhausts are on the other side. It uses a firing order of 1-5-3-6-2-4 (which is the firing order used by most straight-six engines), rather than the common V6 firing order of 1-2-3-4-5-6 or 1-6-5-4-3-2.

==== 60 degrees ====
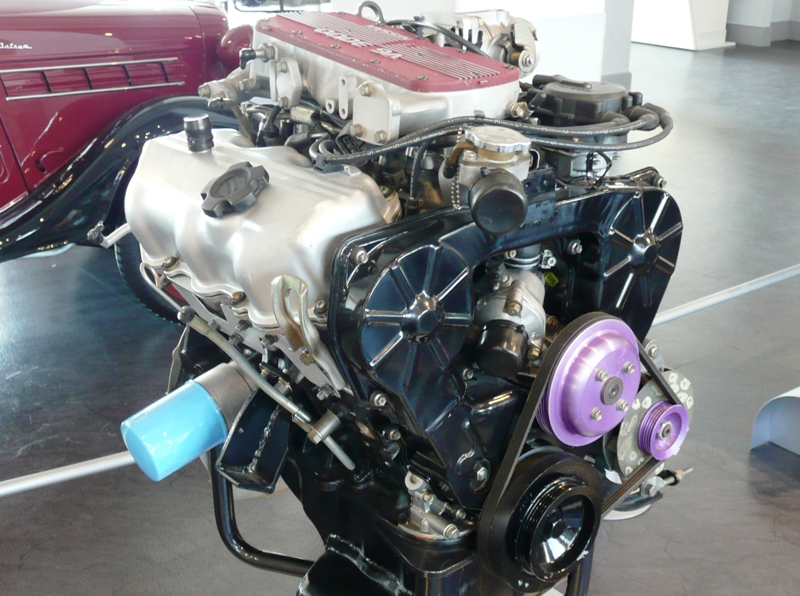
1984–1999 Nissan VG30E 60-degree engine

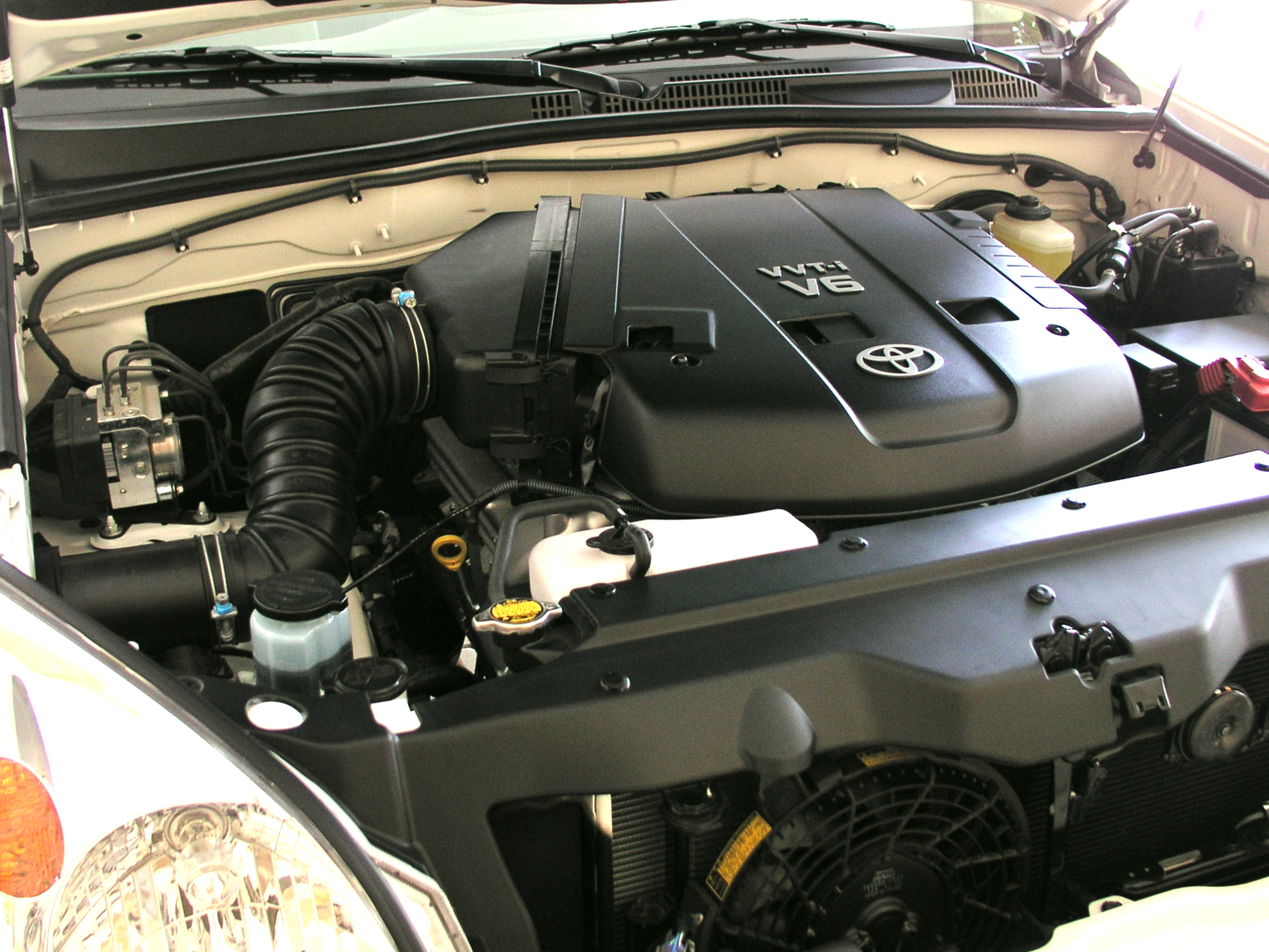
Toyota 1GR-FE 4.0 Litre 60-degree V6 Engine

A V-angle of 60 degrees is the optimal configuration for V6 engines regarding engine balance. When individual crank pins are used for each cylinder (i.e. using a six-throw crankshaft), an even firing interval of 120 degrees can be used. This firing interval is a multiple of the 60-degree V-angle; therefore, the combustion forces can be balanced through the use of the appropriate firing order.

The inline-three engine that forms each cylinder bank, however, produces unbalanced rotating and reciprocal forces. These forces remain unbalanced in all V6 engines, often leading to the use of a balance shaft to reduce the vibration.

The 1950 Lancia V6 engine was pioneering in its use of a six-throw crankshaft to reduce vibration. More recent designs often use a three-throw crankshaft with 'flying arms' between the crankpins allowing for an even firing interval of 120 degrees to be achieved. A pair of counterweights on the crankshaft can then be used to almost perfectly cancel out the primary forces and reduce the secondary vibrations to acceptable levels. The engine mounts can be designed to absorb these remaining vibrations.

A 60-degree V-angle results in a narrower engine overall than V6 engines with larger V-angles. This angle often results in the overall more compact engine, making the engine easier to fit either longitudinally or transversely in the engine compartment.

==== 90 degrees ====
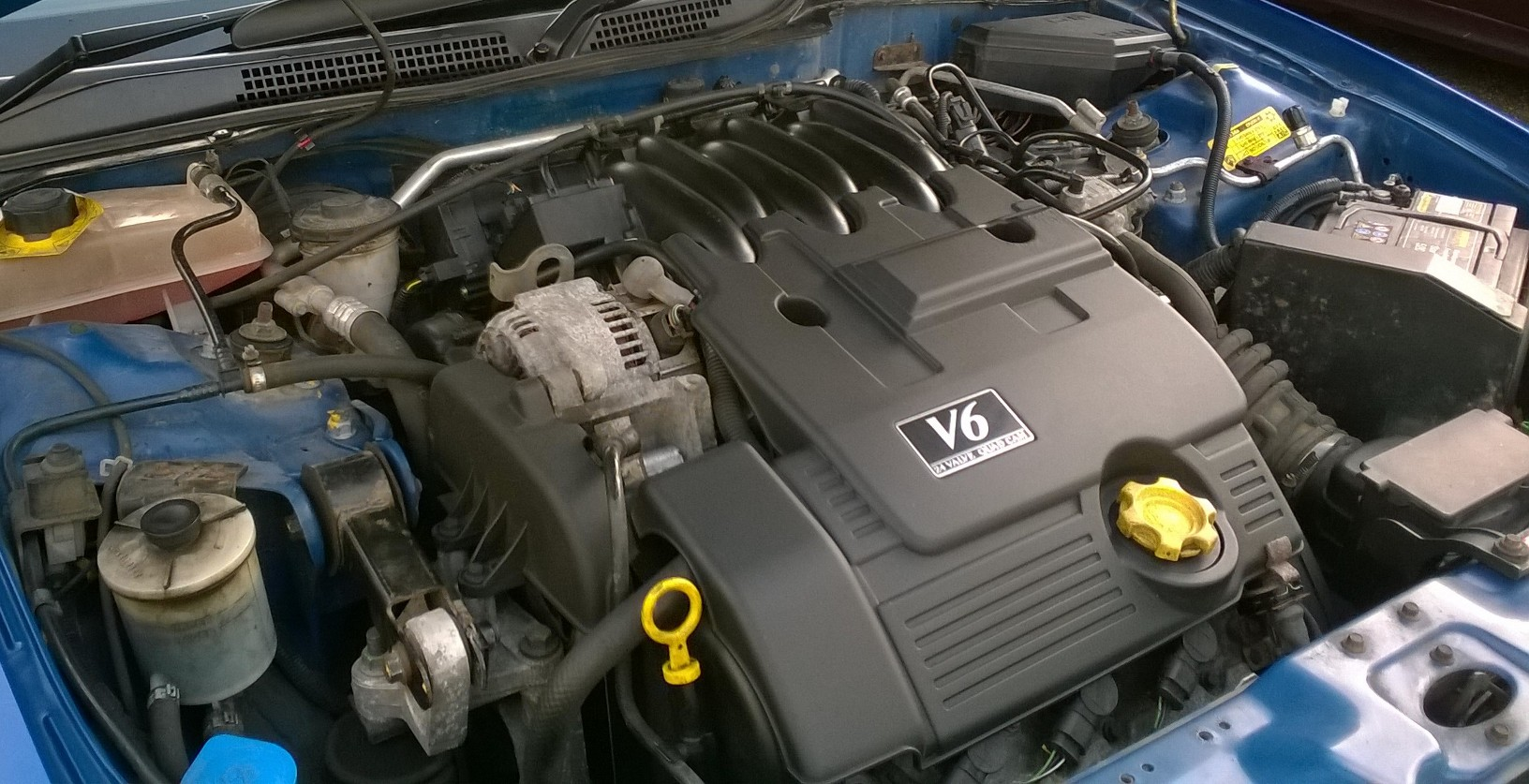
1996–2005 Rover KV6 90-degree engine

Many manufacturers, particularly American ones, built V6 engines with a V-angle of 90 degrees based on their existing 90-degree V8 engines. Such configurations were easy to design by removing two cylinders and replacing the V8 engine's four-throw crankshaft with a three-throw crankshaft. This reduced design costs, allowed the new V6 to share components with the V8 engine, and sometimes allowed manufacturers to build the V6 and V8 engines on the same production line.

The downsides of a 90 degree design are a wider engine which is more vibration-prone than a 60 degree V6. The initial 90 degree V6 engines (such as the Buick Fireball V6 engine) had three shared crankpins arranged at 120 degrees from each other, due to their origins from the V8 engines. This resulted in an uneven firing order, with half of the cylinders using a firing interval of 90 degrees and other half using an interval of 150 degrees. The uneven firing intervals resulted in rough-running engines with "unpleasant" vibrations at low engine speeds.

Several modern 90 degree V6 engines reduce the vibrations using split crankpins offset by 30 degrees between piston pairs, which creates an even firing interval of 120 degrees for all cylinders. For example, the 1977 Buick 231 "even-fire" V6 engine was an upgraded version of the Buick Fireball engine with a split-pin crankshaft to reduce vibration by achieving an even firing order. Such a 'split' crankpin is weaker than a straight one, but modern metallurgical techniques can produce a crankshaft that is adequately strong.

A balance shaft and/or crankshaft counterweights can be used to reduce vibrations in 90 degree V6 engines.

==== 120 degrees ====
At first glance, 120 degrees might seem to be the optimal V-angle for a V6 engine, since pairs of pistons in alternate banks can share crank pins in a three-throw crankshaft and the combustion forces are balanced by the firing interval being equal to the angle between the cylinder banks. A 120 degree configuration, unlike the 60 degree or 90 degree configurations, would not require crankshafts with flying arms, split crankpins, or seven main bearings to be even-firing. However, the primary imbalance caused by odd number of cylinders in each bank still remains in a 120 degree V6 engine. This differs from the perfect balance achieved by a 90 degree V8 engine with a commonly used crossplane crankshaft, because the inline-four engine in each bank of the V8 engine does not have this primary imbalance.

A 120 degree design also results in a large width for the engine, being only slightly narrower than a flat-six engine (which does not have the balance problems of the V6 engine). Therefore, the flat-six engine has been used in various automobiles, whereas use of the 120 degree V6 engine has been limited to a few truck and racing car engines, with the exception of the McLaren M630 engine, which uses a 120 degree bank angle with a single balance shaft to eliminate all primary couples. The M630 also takes advantage of the wide angle by placing the turbochargers inside the vee, commonly referred to as a 'hot vee' configuration. The Ferrari 296 GTB is the first Ferrari road car to sport a V6 turbo with a vee angle of 120 degrees between the cylinder banks.

==== Other angles ====
Other angle V6 engines are possible but can suffer from severe vibration problems unless very carefully designed. Notable V-angles include:

- 45 degrees: EMD 567 and EMD 645 locomotive, marine and stationary Diesel engines. These engines were based on V8 and V16 engines which also used a V-angle of 45 degrees.
- 54 degrees: 1994–2004 General Motors 54-degree automotive engine. A slightly smaller than usual V-angle was used to reduce the width of the engine, allowing it to be used in small transverse-engine front-wheel drive cars.
- 65 degrees: 1956–1975 Ferrari Dino automobile engine. The V-angle was increased from the then-common 60 degree angle to allow larger carburetors to be used (for potentially higher power in race tuning). Crankpins with an offset of 55 degrees within every pair of cylinders were used to achieve the even firing interval of a 60 degree V6 engine. The 2009–2017 Nissan-Renault V9X automobile engine also used a 65 degree bank angle, to allow a turbocharger to fit between the cylinder banks.
- 72 degrees: Mercedes-Benz OM642 BlueTEC diesel engine. This engine uses crank pins offset by 48 degrees, to achieve an even firing interval.
- 75 degrees: 1992–2004 Isuzu V engine used in the Isuzu Rodeo and Isuzu Trooper. These engines were produced in both SOHC and DOHC versions. A 75 degree V6 engine is also used by the 2016–2022 Honda NSX.
- 80 degrees: 1988 Honda RA168-E engine used in the McLaren MP4/4 Formula One racing car.

== Use in automobiles ==
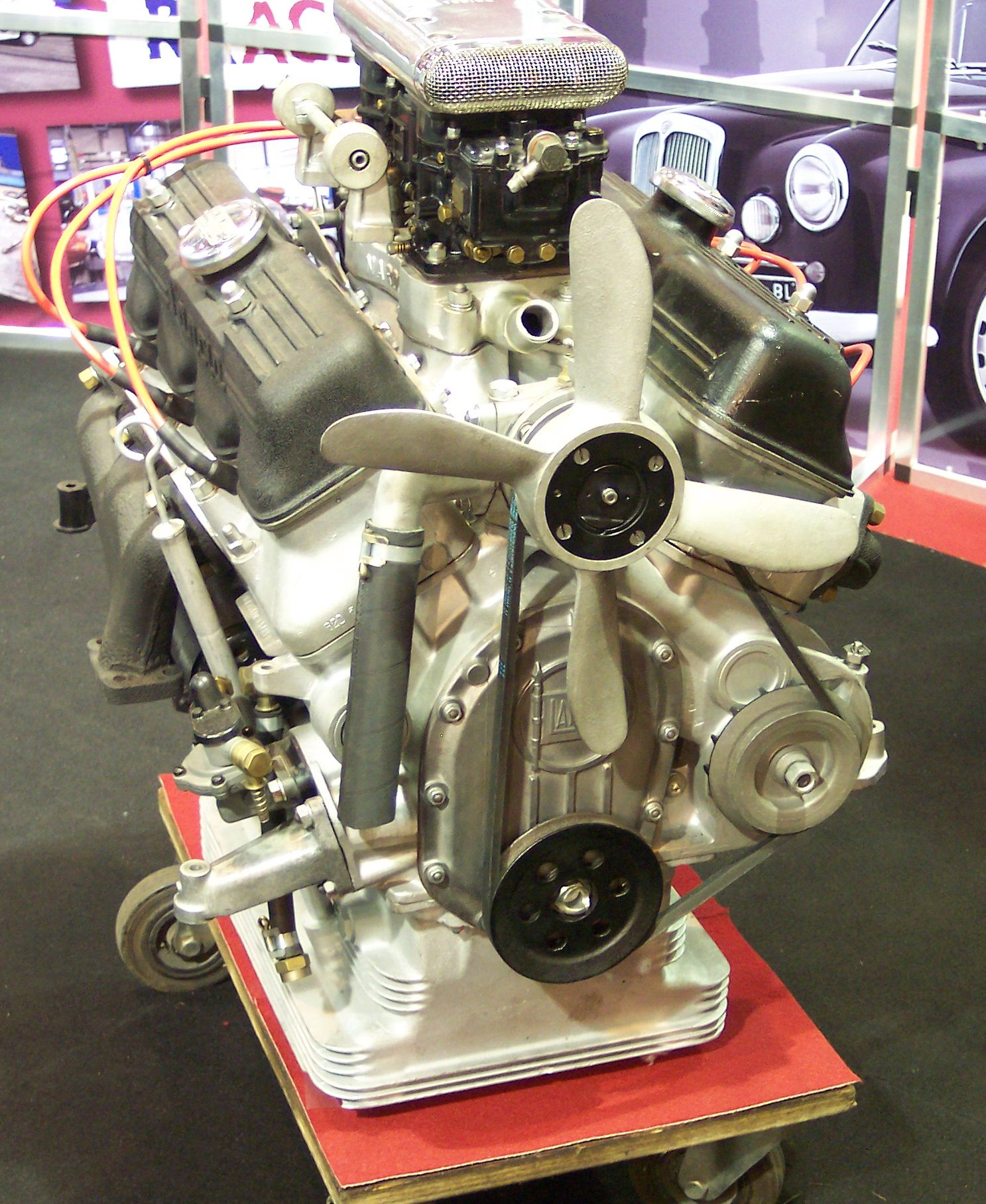
1950–1970 Lancia V6 engine

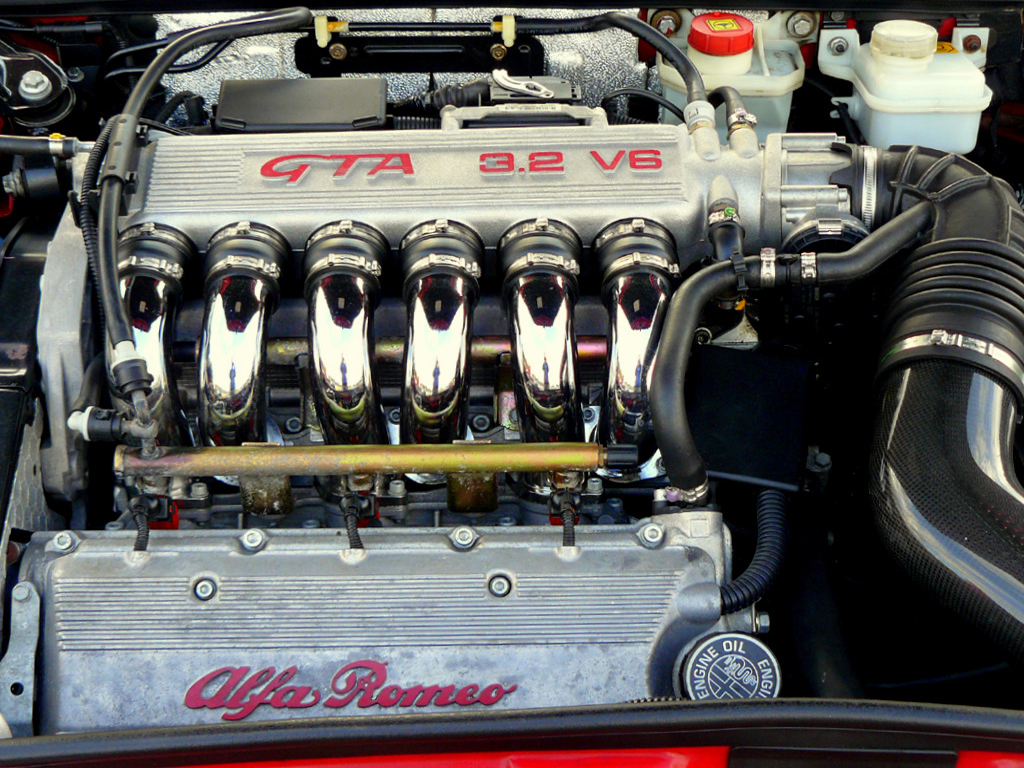
2002–2005 Alfa Romeo V6 engine

In 1906, a few years after 4 cylinder engines and V8 engines had come into existence, the first known V6 engine was built. This V6 engine was a single prototype automotive engine built by Marmon Motor Car Company in the United States. The engine did not reach production. Similarly, a single prototype engine was produced by Buick in 1918.

In 1910 Delahaye produced the first 30° 3.2-litre V6 which was installed in the 1911 Delahaye Type 44 automobile.

The Lancia V6 engine was introduced in the 1950 Lancia Aurelia. Lancia had been producing V4 engines for approximately 30 years, and one of the key goals was to reduce the vibrations compared with the V4 engine. The V6 engine used a 60 degree V-angle and six crankpins, resulting in an evenly-spaced firing order to reduce vibrations.

Other manufacturers took note and soon other V6 engines were designed. In 1959, the GMC V6 engine was introduced in the form of a 60-degree 305 cu in (5 L) petrol engine used in pickup trucks and carryalls. The Buick V6 engine was introduced in 1962 and was based on the all-alloy Buick 215 V8, which shared its 90° bank angle, but unlike the Buick V8, used all-cast iron construction. Initially an uneven-firing engine, Buick later redesigned the crankshaft to a "split-pin" configuration to create an "even-firing" version. After it became the 3800 V6 in 1988, the engine gained a reputation as a reliable, powerful, fuel-efficient workhorse that became a mainstay of GM's FWD mid-size and full-size cars. It was discontinued in 2008. Over 25 million units had been built, making it one of the most-produced engines in history, and it was on Ward's 10 Best Engines of the 20th century list.

Ford introduced its European road car engines in 1965 with the German division's Cologne V6, and the Ford Essex V6 engine, introduced by Ford's United Kingdom division in 1966; both engines used a 60-degree V-angle. The 1967 Dino 206 GT was Ferrari's first V6 road car, which had a 65-degree V-angle.

The 1979-2005 Alfa Romeo V6 engine was introduced in the Alfa Romeo Alfa 6 luxury sedan and later used in many other Alfa Romeo models. This engine used a 60 degree V-angle, an all-aluminium construction and two valves per cylinder. A turbocharged version was introduced in 1991 and a four valve per cylinder version was introduced in 1997. Also in 1970, the Citroën SM grand tourer was introduced, powered by a 90-degree V6 built by Maserati.

The Chevrolet 90° V6 engine was introduced in 1978 and is based on the Chevrolet small-block engine with two cylinders removed. The original engine family was phased out in early 2014 and it was mostly used in Chevrolet and GMC trucks and vans. Its discontinuation marked the end of Chevrolet small-block engine designs dating back to the 1955 model year. It was replaced by another V6 of similar displacement that is based on the Generation V LS-based engine.

The first mass-produced Japanese V6 engine was the Nissan VG engine, a 60-degree design which was produced from 1983 to 2004. The Honda C engine was introduced in 1985, followed by the Mitsubishi 6G7 engine and the Mazda J engine in 1986, the Toyota VZ engine in 1988, and the Isuzu V engine in 1992. Hyundai introduced the first South Korean Hyundai Sigma engine based on technology shared from the Mitsubishi unit in 1995.

German car manufacturers were relatively slow to adopt V6 engines, because engineers believed that they lacked the smoothness of an inline-six engine. The first German V6 engine was a 2.8 liter 90° V6 that was launched in the 1990 Audi 100. Different variants of this engine gradually replaced the inline-5 engines that were commonly used in large and/or high-performance Audi vehicles. The second engine was the VR6 engine, which was introduced across Volkswagen's mid-size and sports car lineup in the 1990s. In 1998, Mercedes-Benz introduced its first V6 engine, the M112, while BMW has continued to use inline-six engines. Mercedes-Benz discontinued production of V6 engines in 2023, and has returned to making inline-six engines.

The first independently designed British V6 engine was the Rover KV6 engine, which replaced the Honda C engine that was previously used in the Rover 800. Jaguar used the Ford-based AJ-V6 engine until 2011 in their smaller cars, but also shared a V6 version of the 90° AJ-V8 engine with Land Rover for use in the XE, XF, XJ, F-Type and the F-Pace. Land Rover used it in the Range Rover, Range Rover Sport, Range Rover Velar, and the Discovery 4.

The 90° V6 engine was discontinued in 2020, and Jaguar Land Rover replaced it with the new Ingenium engine, which has an inline-six variant for JLR's bigger cars and SUVs.

By the mid-1990s, the V6 layout was the most common configuration for six-cylinder automotive engines, with V6 engines having replaced most of the straight-six engines. Today, it is being progressively replaced across the car industry by turbocharged 4-cylinder engines, which can produce similar power, but in a smaller package that produces cleaner emissions, has better fuel economy, and are less expensive to produce.

=== Motor racing ===
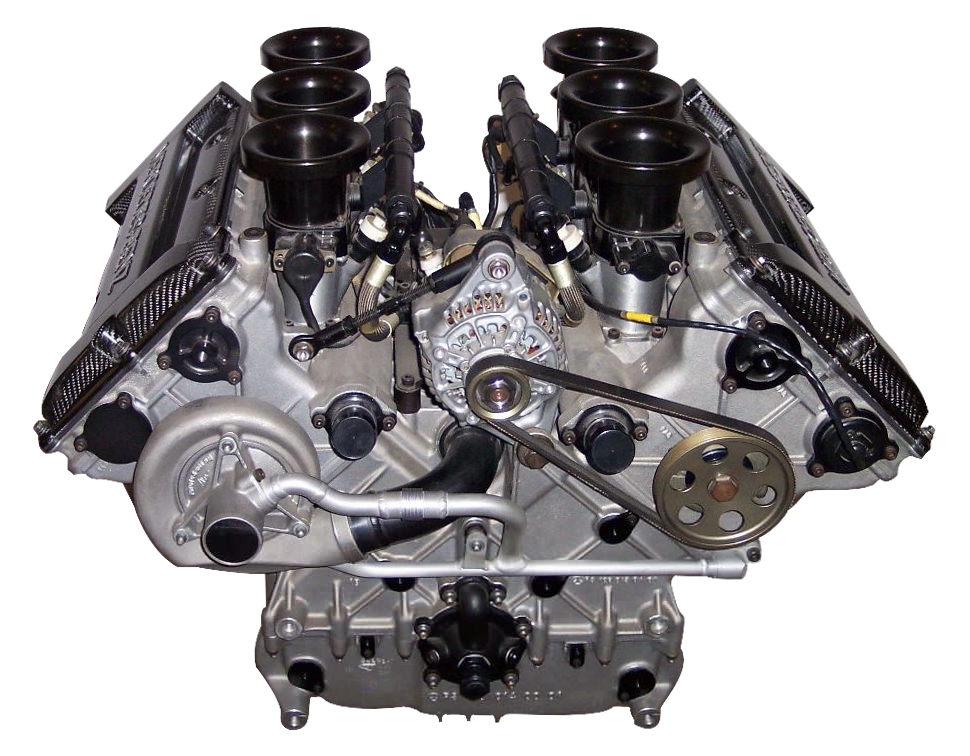
Mercedes-Benz M106 V6 DTM engine

The Lancia Aurelia (the first series production car with a V6 engine) was also successful in motor racing. Four of the Aurelia B20 Coupes were entered in the 1951 Mille Miglia with the best placed cars finishing second and fourth. A tuned 3,102 cc (189 cu in) version of the Lancia V6 engine producing was 169 kW (230 PS) used in the Lancia D24. The D24 competed in sports car racing and won the 1953 Carrera Panamericana with Juan Manuel Fangio at the wheel.

The initial version of the Ferrari Dino engine was a 1.5 L (92 cu in) racing engine used in Formula Two racing in the 1957 season. It had a V-angle of 65 degrees and dual overhead camshafts. The Dino V6 underwent several evolutions, including a 2.4 L (146 cu in) version used in the 1958 Ferrari 246 Formula One racing car. A few years later, the 1961–1964 Ferrari 156 Formula One car used a new V6 engine with a V-angle of 120 degrees and a displacement of 1.5 L (92 cu in). This engine was shorter and lighter than the Ferrari Dino engine, and the simplicity and low center of gravity of the engine was an advantage in racing. It won a large number of races between 1961 and 1964. However, Ferrari's founder had a personal dislike of the 120 degree layout, preferring a 65 degree layout, and after that time it was replaced by other engines. The Dino engine was also used in the Lancia Stratos, which was a highly successful rally car that won the World Rally Championship in 1974, 1975 and 1976.

A notable racing use of the Alfa Romeo V6 engine was the Alfa Romeo 155 V6 TI, designed for the 1993 DTM season and equipped with a 2.5 L (150 cu in) engine making a peak power of 360 kW (490 PS) at 11,900 rpm.

The Renault-Gordini CH1 was a 90 degree V6 engine with an iron block. It was introduced in the 1973 Alpine-Renault A440 sports car racing car. This engine won the European 2 L prototype championship in 1974 and several European Formula Two Championships. A turbocharged 2.0 L (122 cu in) version was used in the Renault Alpine A442, which won the 24 Hours of Le Mans in 1978.

A turbocharged 1.5 L (92 cu in) version of the Renault-Gordini CH1 engine was introduced in the 1977 Renault RS01 Formula One car. Renault struggled with reliability issues in 1977 and 1978; however, the 1979 season saw some good results at a few races. In 1981, the Ferrari 126C Formula One car used a turbocharged V6 engine. Ferrari won the Formula One constructors' championship with turbocharged V6 engines in 1982 and 1983. Initial versions used a 120 degree V-angle, before switching to a 90 degree V-angle for the 1987 Ferrari F1/87 racing car. Other successful turbocharged V6 Formula One cars in the era of 1982–1988 were the McLaren MP4/2, McLaren MP4/3, McLaren MP4/4, Williams FW10, Williams FW11, Williams FW12, Lotus 95T, Lotus 97T, Lotus 98T, Lotus 99T and Lotus 100T.

The Nissan GTP ZX-Turbo and Nissan NPT-90 competed in the IMSA sports car prototype category from 1985 to 1994 and used a turbocharged V6 engine loosely based on the Nissan VG30ET production car engine. The Nissan 300ZX used a similar engine to compete in the 1996–1997 All Japan Grand Touring Car Championship (now known as the 'Super GT' championship).

Downsizing to V6 engines in open-wheeler racing became more common:

- the IndyCar Series switched to turbocharged V6 engines in 2012.
- the GP3 Series switched to naturally aspirated V6 engines in 2013.
- the Formula One World Championship switched to turbocharged hybrid V6 engines in 2014.
- the FIA Formula 2 Championship (formerly known as the GP2 Series) switched to turbocharged V6 engines in 2018.
- the FIA Formula 3 Championship (created from the merger of the GP3 Series and the FIA Formula 3 European Championship) began using naturally aspirated V6 engines from 2019.

== Use in marine vessels and railway engines ==
V6 engines are popular powerplants in medium to large outboard motors.

The first V6 engine to reach production was built from 1908 to 1913 by the Deutz Gasmotoren Fabrik in Germany. These V6 engines were used as the generator for gasoline-electric railway engines.

== Use in motorcycles ==
The Laverda V6 was a racing motorcycle which was unveiled at the 1977 Milan show. It entered the 1978 Bol d'Or 24 hour endurance race, however it retired with mechanical issues after approximately 8 hours.

Horex has produced road motorcycles with VR6 engines since 2012.

== See also ==
- Flat-six engine
- Straight-six engine
