= Tim Wright (engineer, born 1949) =

Formula One engineer

- Born: 29 January 1949 (age 77); Uxbridge, Middlesex

Tim Wright (born 29 January 1949) is a former Formula One engineer.

He should not be confused with another Tim Wright, who has been a racing engineer for F1 teams Force India and Caterham.

== Career ==
Wright has a remarkable racing pedigree, dating back to the late 1970s when he worked at Bruce McLaren Motor Racing. His career then took him to Fittipaldi Automotive as a senior design draughtsman and then to the Spirit F1 team. In 1983 he returned to McLaren where he spent the next six seasons working with Alain Prost, including Alain's two title-winning seasons in 1985 and 1986.

When Prost left McLaren to join Ferrari, Wright went to Peugeot Talbot Sport and engineered Derek Warwick to the 1992 World Sportscar Championship. He also oversaw Warwick, Yannick Dalmas and Mark Blundell to victory for Peugeot in the Le Mans 24 Hours.

In April 1993 he was hired by Jordan to work with Thierry Boutsen, but he left the team at the end of the year and joined his old Peugeot boss André de Cortanze at Sauber.

For the 1995 Formula One season he joined Benetton where he engineered Johnny Herbert to his first GP win at the British Grand Prix. When Benetton was taken over by Renault, Wright continued to run the test team and then looked after the reliability of test and race cars. Wright left Renault early in 2009 and is now a race engineer with the revitalised Formula 2 run by Jonathan Palmer.
