= McLaren MP4/6 =

Formula One racing car

McLaren MP4/6 McLaren MP4/6B
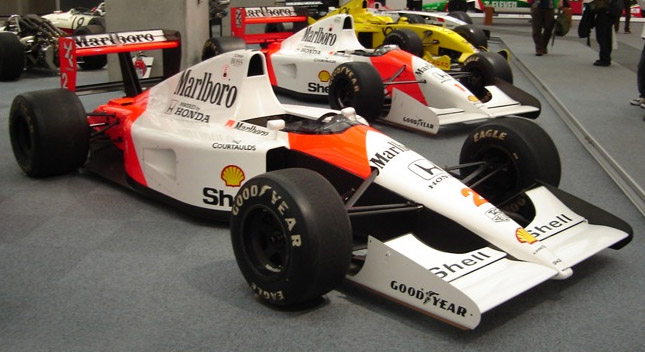
- The MP4/6 of Gerhard Berger
- Category: Formula One
- Constructor: McLaren International (chassis); Honda Racing F1 (engine)
- Designers: Neil Oatley (Executive Engineer); Matthew Jeffreys (Head of Vehicle Design); David North (Head of Transmission); David Neilson (Head of Suspension); Dieter Gundel (Head of Systems Engineering); Bob Bell (Head of R&D); Mike Gascoyne (Head of Aerodynamics); Osamu Goto (Engine Technical Director (Honda))
- Predecessor: MP4/5B
- Successor: MP4/7A

Technical specifications
- Chassis: Carbon fibre monocoque
- Engine: Honda RA121/E, 3.5 L (214 cu in), 60° V12 NA (max: 14000 rpm for MP4/6 and 15300 rpm for MP4/6B) mid-engine, longitudinally mounted
- Transmission: Weismann/McLaren Transverse 6-speed manual
- Power: 725 hp (540.6 kW) @ 13,500 rpm (early season); 780 hp (581.6 kW) @ 14,800 rpm (late season)
- Fuel: Shell
- Tyres: Goodyear

Competition history
- Notable entrants: Honda Marlboro McLaren
- Notable drivers: 1. (Brazil) Ayrton Senna; 2. (Austria) Gerhard Berger
- Debut: 1991 United States Grand Prix (MP4/6); 1992 South African Grand Prix (MP4/6B)
- First win: 1991 United States Grand Prix
- Last win: 1991 Australian Grand Prix
- Last event: 1991 Australian Grand Prix (MP4/6); 1992 Brazilian Grand Prix (MP4/6B)
Races	Wins	Podiums	Poles	F/Laps
18	8	19	10	5
- Constructors' Championships: 1 (1991)
- Drivers' Championships: 1 (1991, Ayrton Senna)

The McLaren MP4/6 is a Formula One racing car designed by McLaren's Neil Oatley, Matthew Jeffreys, David North, David Neilson, Bob Bell and Mike Gascoyne; powered by the Honda RA121E V12 engine for use in the 1991 Formula One season, with the engine's design and development led by Osamu Goto. It was driven by reigning World Champion, Brazilian Ayrton Senna, and Austria's Gerhard Berger. Ayrton Senna would win his third World Championship in the MP4/6. The MP4/6 was notable for being the last F1 car to win the championship with a manual gearbox and the only F1 car powered by a V12 engine to do so.

== Design and pre-season testing ==
The MP4/6 was the first McLaren to be powered by a Honda V12 engine, which Honda quoted at 735 PS (725 bhp; 541 kW) at 13,500rpm. The car was tested by Berger in the off-season, but he was unimpressed with the initial version of the new engine, feeling it was underpowered compared to the 690 bhp (515 kW; 700 PS) V10 engine used in the 1990 car, the MP4/5B. When Senna returned for pre-season testing, he echoed Berger's concerns about the lack of power saying that he was expecting more from a V12 and that it really felt no more powerful than the old V10. However, McLaren and Honda knuckled down to try to solve the engine's problems. McLaren's domination in the early part of the year was mainly due to the lack of reliability of the 700 bhp (522 kW; 710 PS) Renault V10-powered Williams FW14.

By the latter half of the season, Honda (at Senna's urging) had managed to improve the engine to 780 hp (581.6 kW) @ 14,800 rpm.

The MP4/6 raced throughout 1991 with a manual "H" pattern gearbox. A semi-automatic transmission was tested during the season (and shown at the Hungarian Grand Prix; the car equipped with it ran 4 laps on track in practice before Senna spun off; the car was then converted back to a manual), but was never regarded as good enough to be used in a race; Ferrari and Williams were the only teams to use semi-automatic gearboxes during 1991. The MP4/6 would go down as the last Formula One car to win a World Championship using a manual transmission.

== Season summary ==
Senna won the first four races of the season, in the United States, Brazil, San Marino and Monaco, before Williams and Nigel Mansell found their feet with the FW14, which dominated in mid-season. Consistent podium finishes on Senna's part throughout the year helped McLaren, but Senna insisted that Honda step up their engine development programme and demanded further improvements to the car before it was too late. Honda responded with updated versions of the V12 engine, while Oatley redesigned various features of the car, particularly the sidepods and wings. Senna won in Hungary and Belgium before clinching his third and final Drivers' Championship in Japan with second place behind Berger; he then won the final race in Australia to secure the team's fourth consecutive Constructors' Championship.

McLaren continued with the MP4/6, upgraded to 'B' specification, for the first two races of 1992, Senna finishing third in South Africa. The MP4/6B was then replaced with the car designed for the 1992 season, the MP4/7A which had a semi-automatic transmission and traction control, though three MP4/6Bs were brought to the 1992 Brazilian Grand Prix as spares.

The MP4/6 was considered by some to be the most competitive car in the Formula One field until Williams sorted the FW14, which was aerodynamically and technically more advanced. In all, the MP4/6 took eight Grand Prix wins and ten pole positions and scored 148 points. The car brought a close to McLaren's and Honda's domination of the sport, stretching back to the mid-1980s.

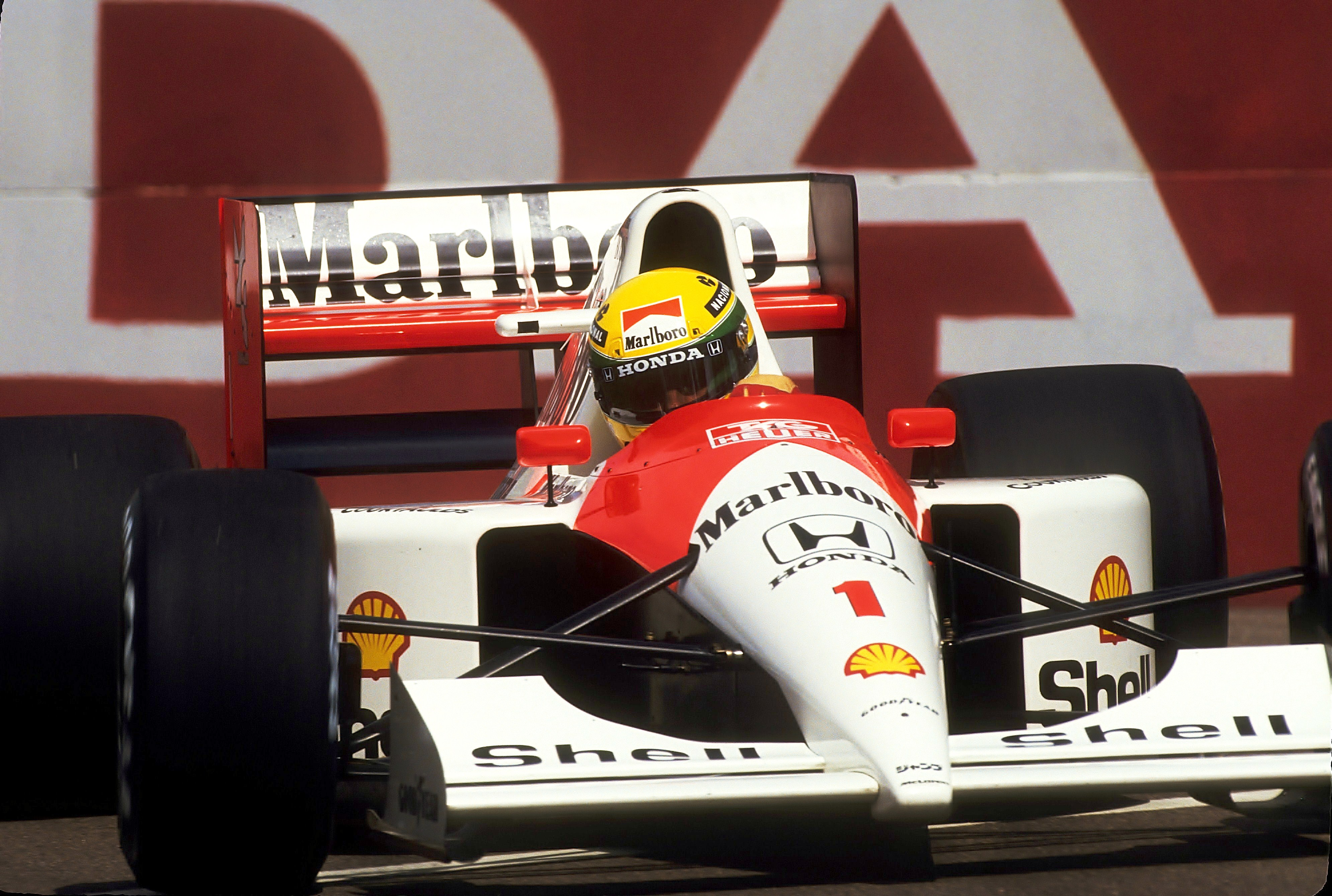
Ayrton Senna won the 1991 United States Grand Prix with the MP4/6.

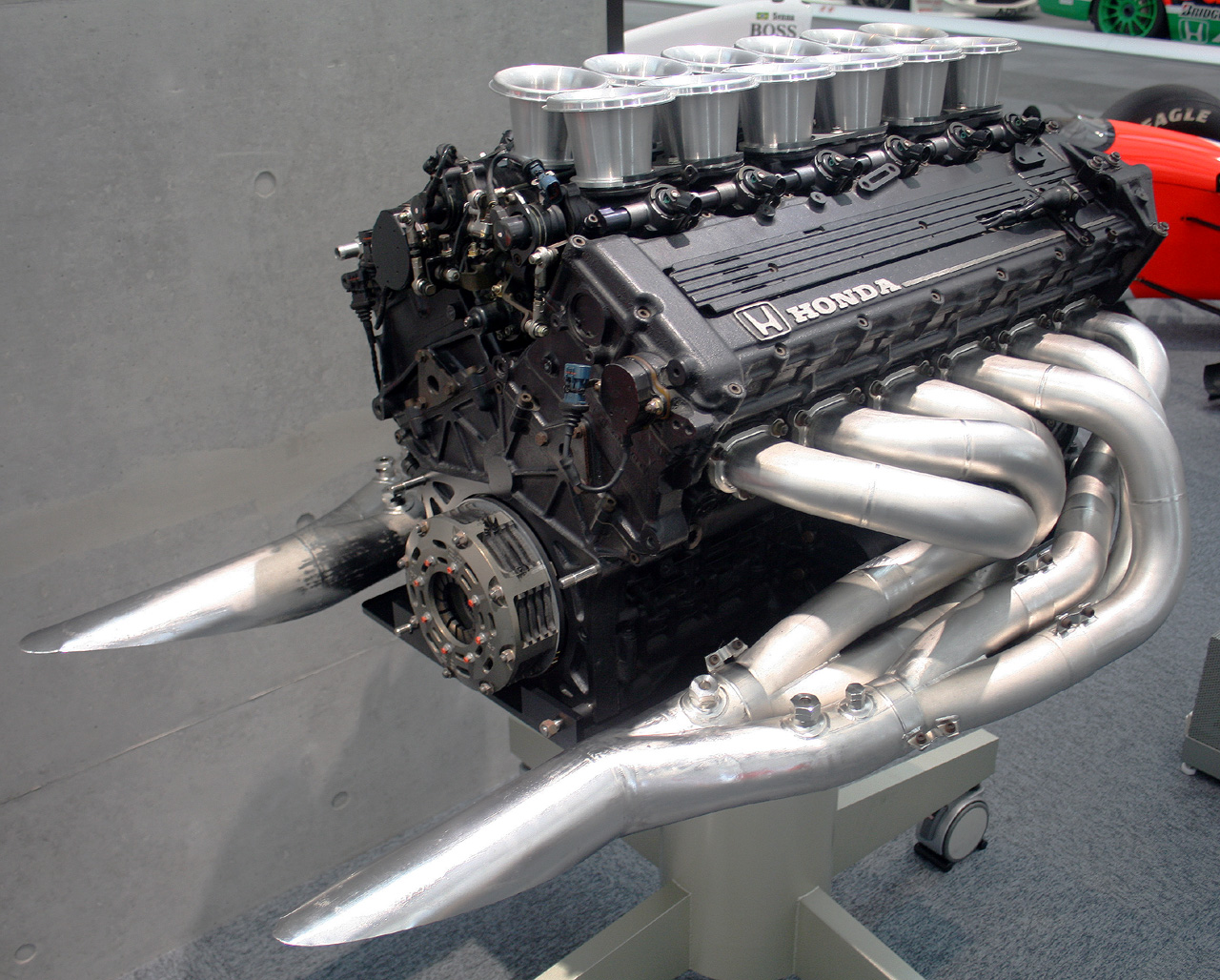
The Honda RA121E V12 engine.

== In popular culture ==
The McLaren MP4/6 is included as a classic car in Codemasters F1 2017, F1 2018, F1 2019 and F1 2020 video games. It is also featured in Automobilista 2 in the same pack of the McLaren MP4/7A and the McLaren MP4/8.

== Complete Formula One results ==
(key) (results in bold indicate pole position, results in italics indicate fastest lap)

Year	Entrant	Chassis	Engine	Tyres	Drivers	1	2	3	4	5	6	7	8	9	10	11	12	13	14	15	16	Pts.	WCC
1991	Honda Marlboro McLaren	MP4/6	Honda RA121E; V12	G		USA	BRA	SMR	MON	CAN	MEX	FRA	GBR	GER	HUN	BEL	ITA	POR	ESP	JPN	AUS	**139**	1st
1991	Honda Marlboro McLaren	MP4/6	Honda RA121E; V12	G	Ayrton Senna	**1**	**1**	**1**	**1**	Ret	3	3	4	7	**1**	**1**	**2**	2	5	2	**1**	**139**	1st
1991	Honda Marlboro McLaren	MP4/6	Honda RA121E; V12	G	Gerhard Berger	Ret	3	2	Ret	Ret	Ret	Ret	2	4	4	2	4	Ret	**Ret**	**1**	3	**139**	1st
1992	Honda Marlboro McLaren	MP4/6B	Honda RA121E; V12	G		RSA	MEX	BRA	ESP	SMR	MON	CAN	FRA	GBR	GER	HUN	BEL	ITA	POR	JPN	AUS	**99***	2nd
1992	Honda Marlboro McLaren	MP4/6B	Honda RA121E; V12	G	Ayrton Senna	3	Ret															**99***	2nd
1992	Honda Marlboro McLaren	MP4/6B	Honda RA121E; V12	G	Gerhard Berger	5	4															**99***	2nd

* Only 9 points scored with the MP4/6B. Remaining points scored with MP4/7A.
