= McLaren MP4/7A =

Formula One racing car for the 1992 season

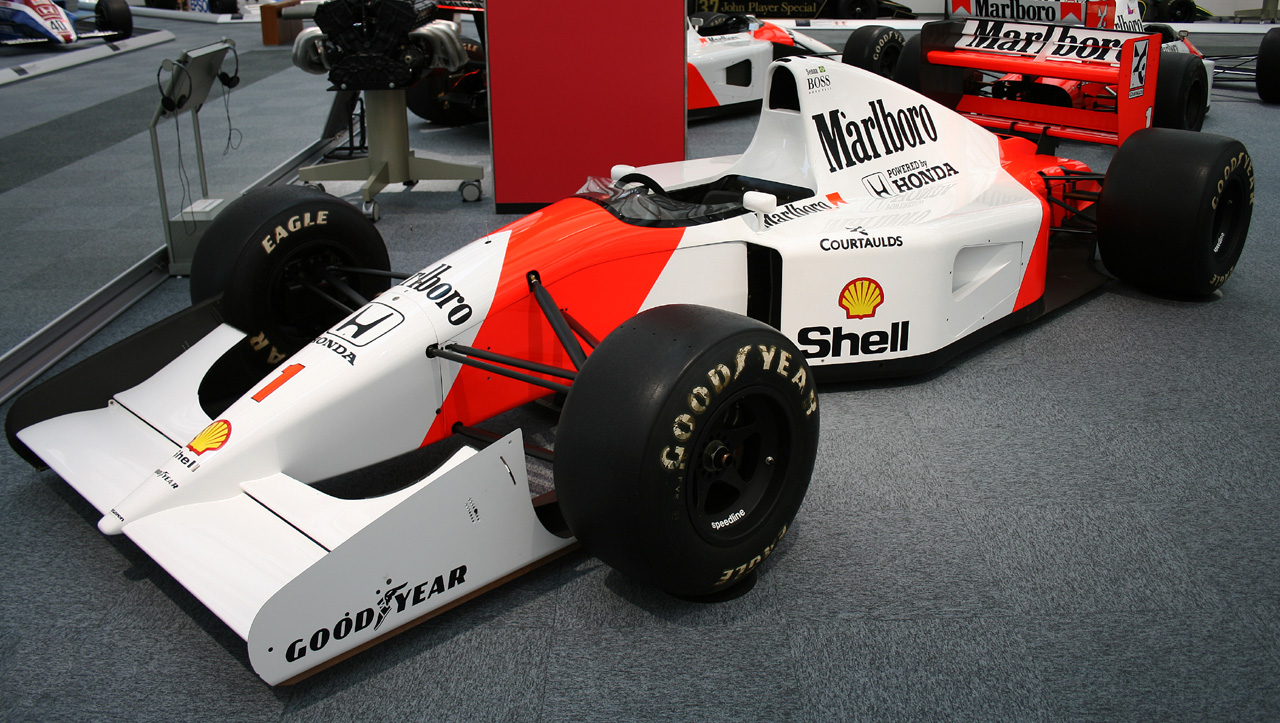
- The MP4/7A of Ayrton Senna on display at the Honda Collection Hall
- Category: Formula One
- Constructor: McLaren International (chassis, gearbox); Honda Racing F1 (engine)
- Designers: Neil Oatley (Executive Engineer); Matthew Jeffreys (Head of Vehicle Design); David North (Head of Transmission); David Neilson (Head of Suspension); Dieter Gundel (Head of Systems Engineering); Bob Bell (Head of R&D); Henri Durand (Head of Aerodynamics); Osamu Goto (Engine Technical Director (Honda))
- Predecessor: MP4/6B
- Successor: MP4/8

Technical specifications
- Chassis: Carbon fibre monocoque
- Suspension (front): Double wishbones, pushrods
- Suspension (rear): Double wishbones, pushrods
- Engine: Honda RA122E/B, 3,496 cc (213.3 cu in), 75° V12 NA (max: 15000 rpm) mid-engine, longitudinally mounted
- Transmission: McLaren transverse 6-speed semi-automatic
- Power: 764–805 hp (570–600 kW; 775–816 PS) @ 14,500 rpm
- Fuel: Shell
- Tyres: Goodyear

Competition history
- Notable entrants: Honda Marlboro McLaren
- Notable drivers: 1. (Brazil) Ayrton Senna; 2. (Austria) Gerhard Berger
- Debut: 1992 Brazilian Grand Prix
- First win: 1992 Monaco Grand Prix
- Last win: 1992 Australian Grand Prix
- Last event: 1992 Australian Grand Prix
Races	Wins	Podiums	Poles	F/Laps
14	5	11	1	2
- Constructors' Championships: 0
- Drivers' Championships: 0

The McLaren MP4/7A is a Formula One car designed by McLaren International and Honda Racing F1 for use by McLaren in the 1992 season. It is a follow-up to their successful MP4/6 from 1991.

== Background ==
The Williams-Renault combination was getting faster and more reliable and became a formidable challenger to McLaren's dominance. McLaren used the MP4/6 chassis, now designated MP4/6B for slightly modified front wing aerodynamics, for the first two races of 1992. The all-new MP4/7A was expected for the Spanish Grand Prix, the fourth race of the year. However, due to Williams' speed in pre-season testing (as well as their dominance of the first two rounds of the season), McLaren team principal Ron Dennis made the decision to bring the car out one race early, at the Brazilian Grand Prix. This was one month earlier than expected.

== Design ==
This was the first McLaren to use a semi-automatic transmission; it was a McLaren-designed electro-hydraulic clutch and paddle-shift unit with semi-automatic activation (a semi-automatic transmission had been tested during the previous season with the MP4/6 and was on track during practice for the 1991 Hungarian Grand Prix, but the team elected to retain that car's original manual transaxle for the entirety of that car's use in competition). The team's technology partner Techniques d'Avant Garde (TAG) helped with development. This system allowed the driver to keep his foot on the pedal, without lifting from it since the throttle cable was replaced with an electronic sensor. It also controlled engine speed, rev-matching, and clutch actuation automatically during gear changes. The MP4/7A also gained traction control at the Hungarian Grand Prix.

A variant of the car, dubbed MP4/7B, featuring an experimental active suspension system, was introduced in testing for that year's Portuguese Grand Prix, though it proved insufficiently reliable and was not used for the remainder of the 1992 season. The system would, however, be used on the MP4/7A's replacement, 1993's MP4/8.

With Honda pulling out of Formula One at the end of the 1992 season (after 69 wins as an engine supplier since 1983, 44 of them with McLaren), the team would be forced to use customer Ford V8 engines in 1993, thus the MP4/7A was the last McLaren to use the Japanese engines until the McLaren Honda partnership was renewed prior to the 2015 season; the failure of that partnership to produce a race-winning car means the MP4/7A remains the last Honda-powered McLaren Formula One car to win a Grand Prix.

== Season summary ==
For the first time since 1987, McLaren failed to capture the Constructors' or Drivers' Championship title. It was, therefore, the first time the team had failed to win the championships with Honda power, as the years 1988 to 1991 had all been successful in this respect. While the MP4/7A showed that it was able to keep up with the Williams FW14B in a straight line on several occasions, the active suspension on the Williams allowed it to better utilize its aerodynamic package, thus relegating the passively-suspended McLaren to 'best of the rest' status. The MP4/7A also suffered from teething troubles early on: both Senna and Berger dropped out of the car's debut race in Brazil with electrical problems. Defending champion Senna also suffered three straight DNFs during the middle of the season, effectively ending any hopes he may have had at defending his title. Five Grand Prix victories were recorded by the drivers: three for Ayrton Senna, in his fifth season for the team, and two for Gerhard Berger in his third and final season for McLaren before switching back to Ferrari for 1993.

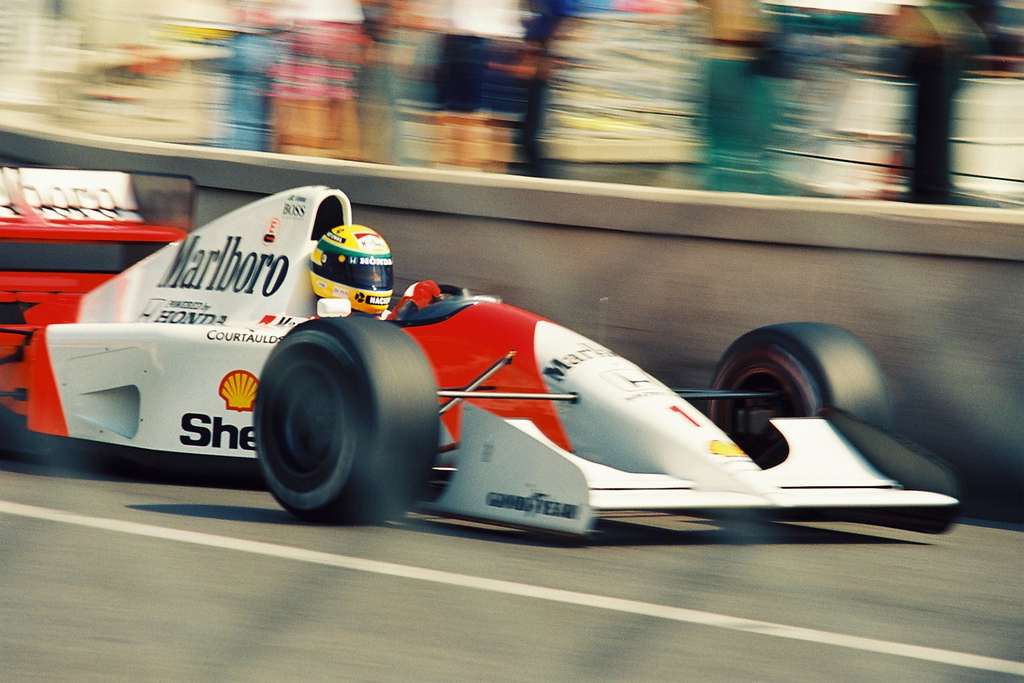
Ayrton Senna driving the MP4/7A at the 1992 Monaco Grand Prix

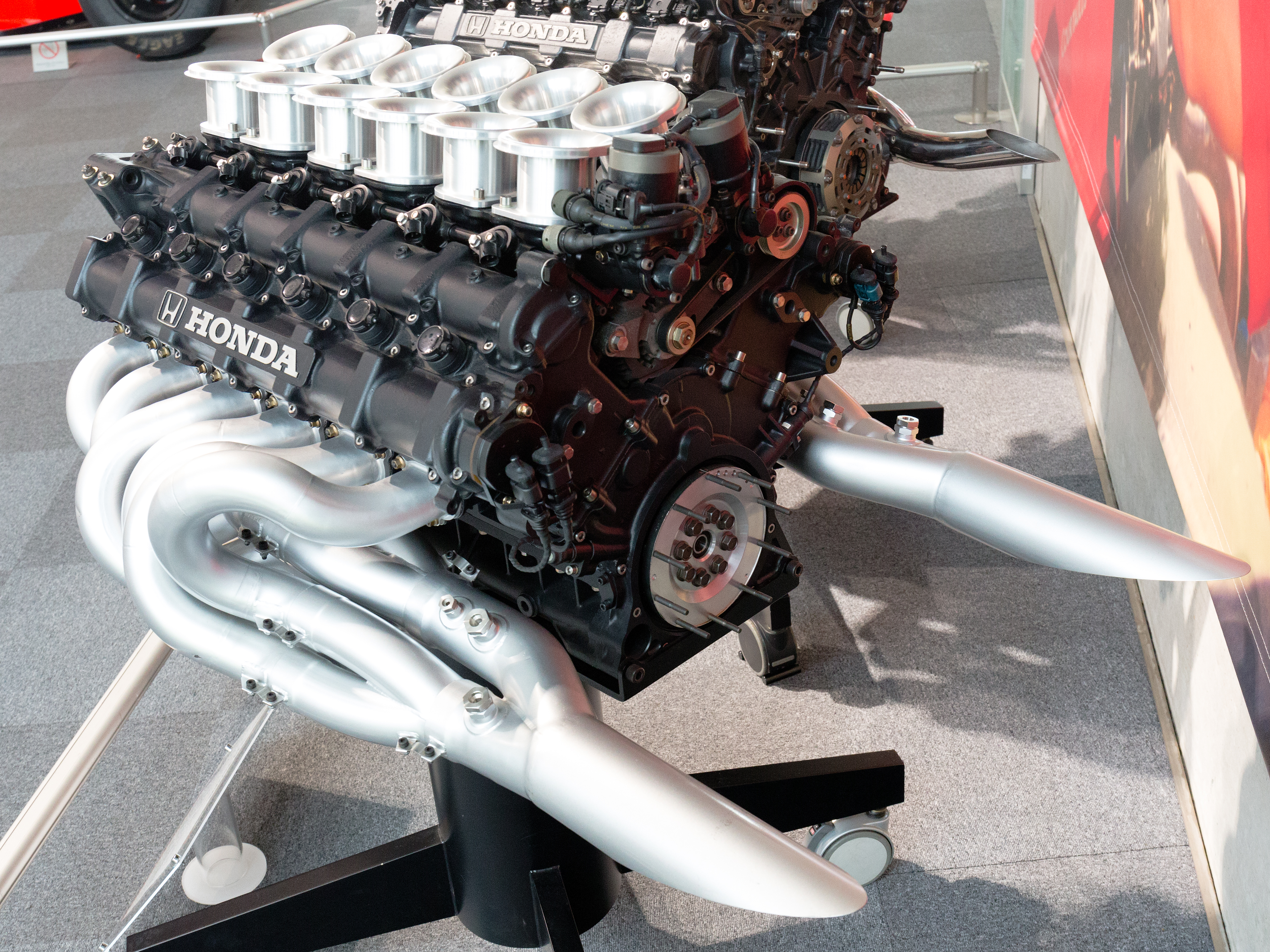
Honda RA122E V12 engine

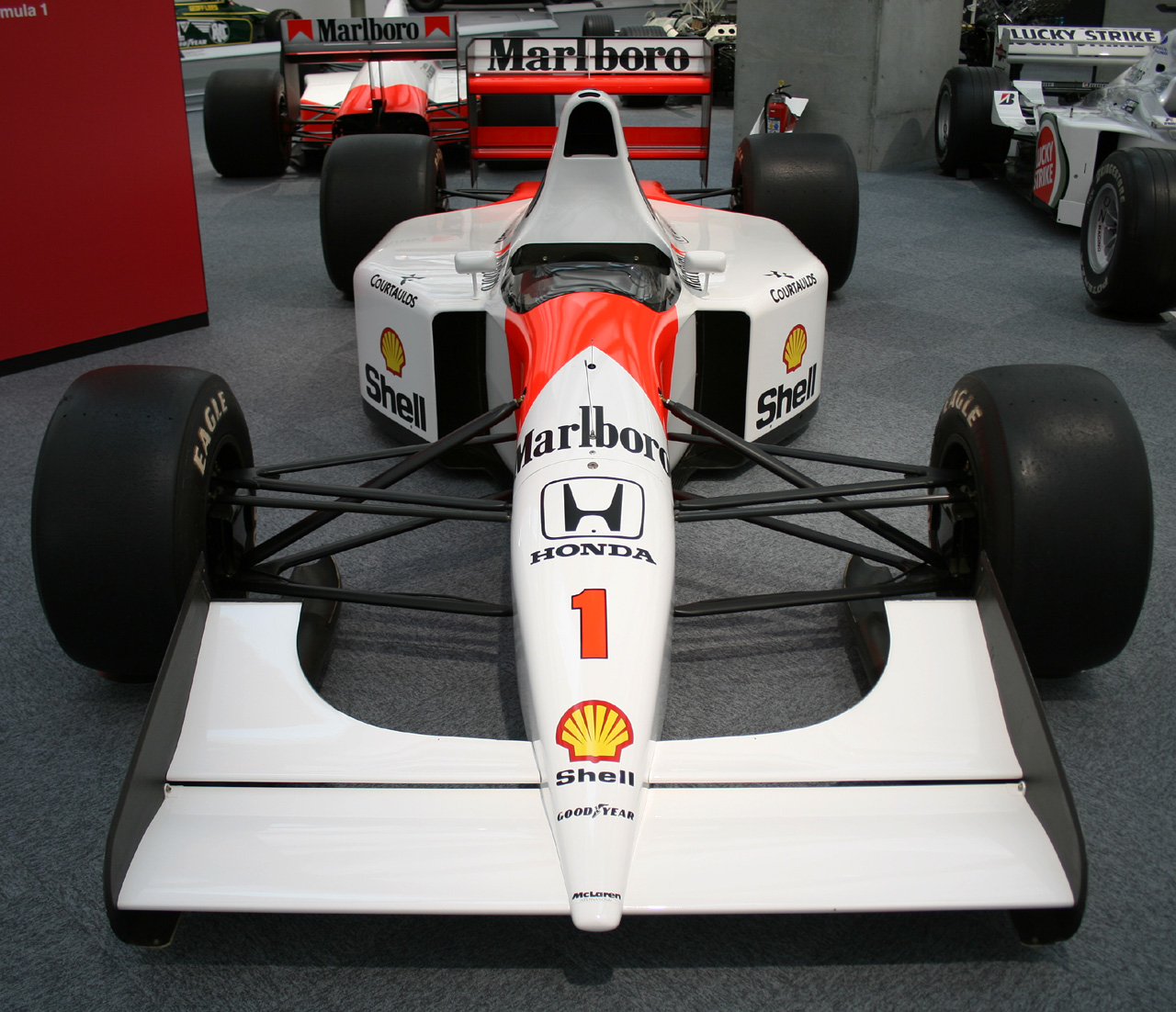
McLaren MP4/7A front view, Honda Collection Hall

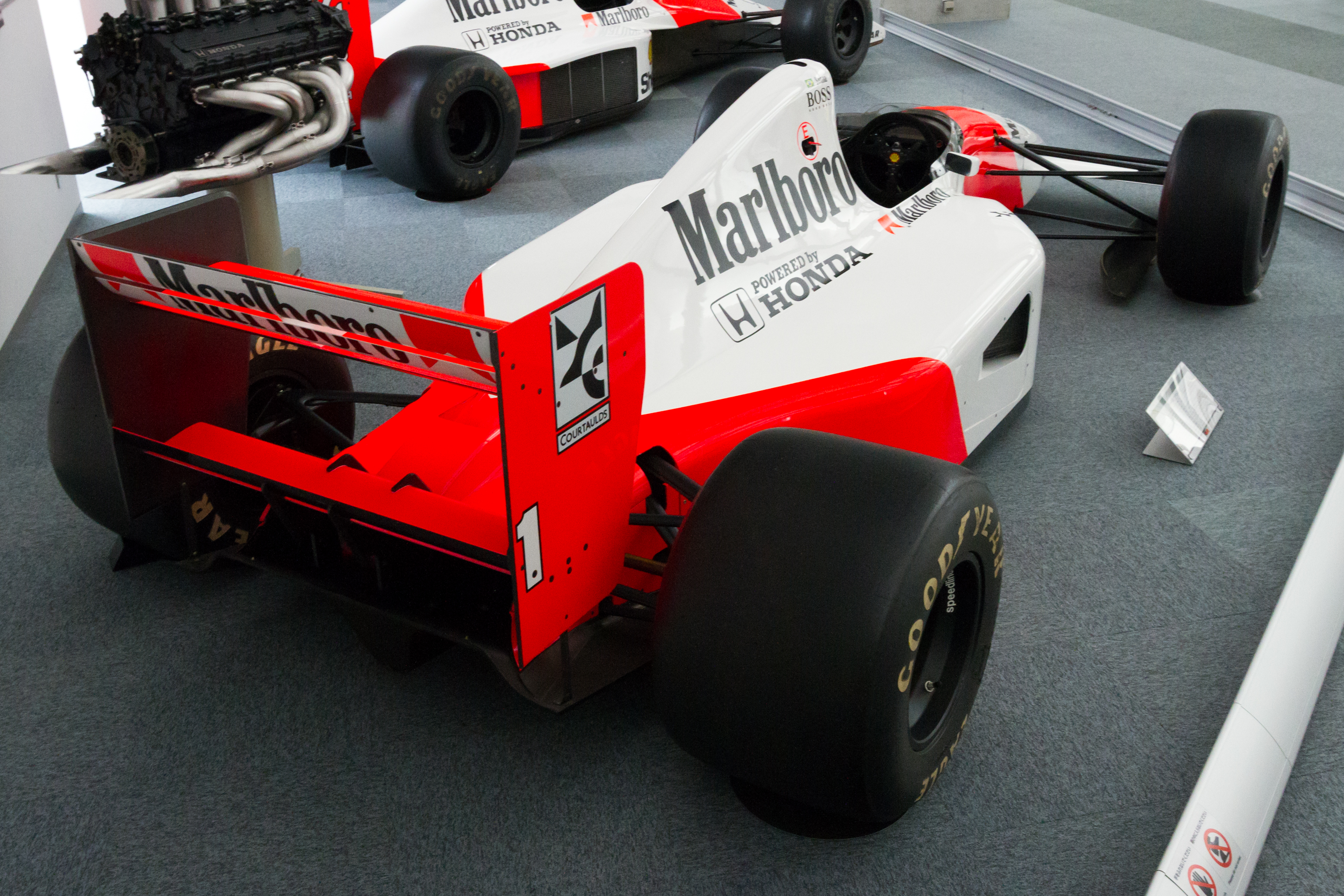
McLaren MP4/7A rear-right view, Honda Collection Hall

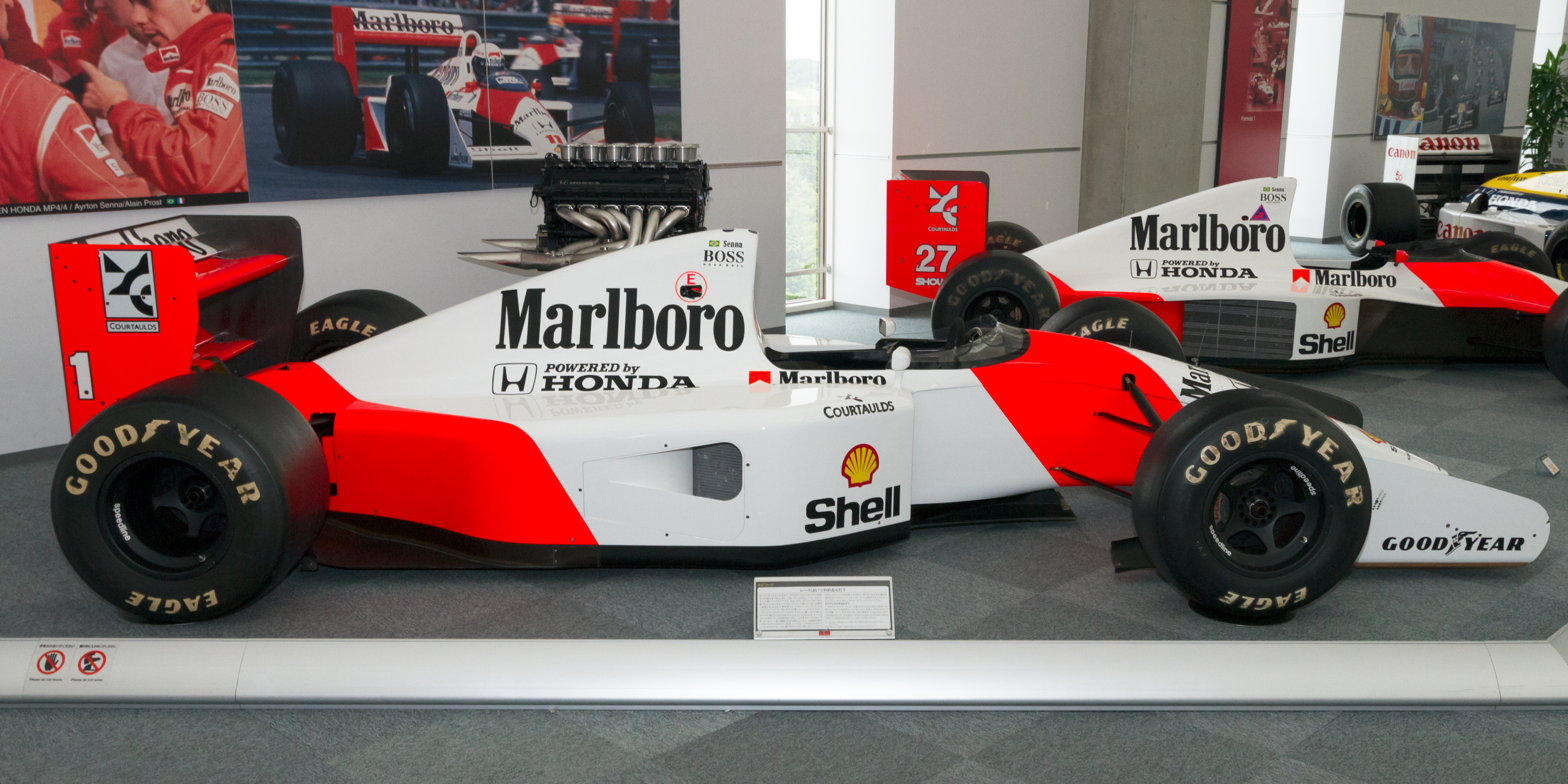
McLaren MP4/7A right view, Honda Collection Hall

== Complete Formula One results ==
(key) (results in bold indicate pole position, results in italics indicate fastest lap)

Year	Team	Engine	Tyres	Drivers	1	2	3	4	5	6	7	8	9	10	11	12	13	14	15	16	Points	WCC
1992	Honda Marlboro McLaren	Honda RA122E/B; V12	**G**		RSA	MEX	BRA	ESP	SMR	MON	CAN	FRA	GBR	GER	HUN	BEL	ITA	POR	JPN	AUS	**99***	**2nd**
1992	Honda Marlboro McLaren	Honda RA122E/B; V12	**G**	Ayrton Senna			Ret	9	3	1	**Ret**	Ret	Ret	2	1	5	1	3	Ret	Ret	**99***	**2nd**
1992	Honda Marlboro McLaren	Honda RA122E/B; V12	**G**	Gerhard Berger			Ret	4	Ret	Ret	1	Ret	5	Ret	3	Ret	4	2	2	1	**99***	**2nd**

* 9 points scored using the McLaren MP4/6B
