= Williams FW14 =

Formula One racing car

Williams FW14 Williams FW14B
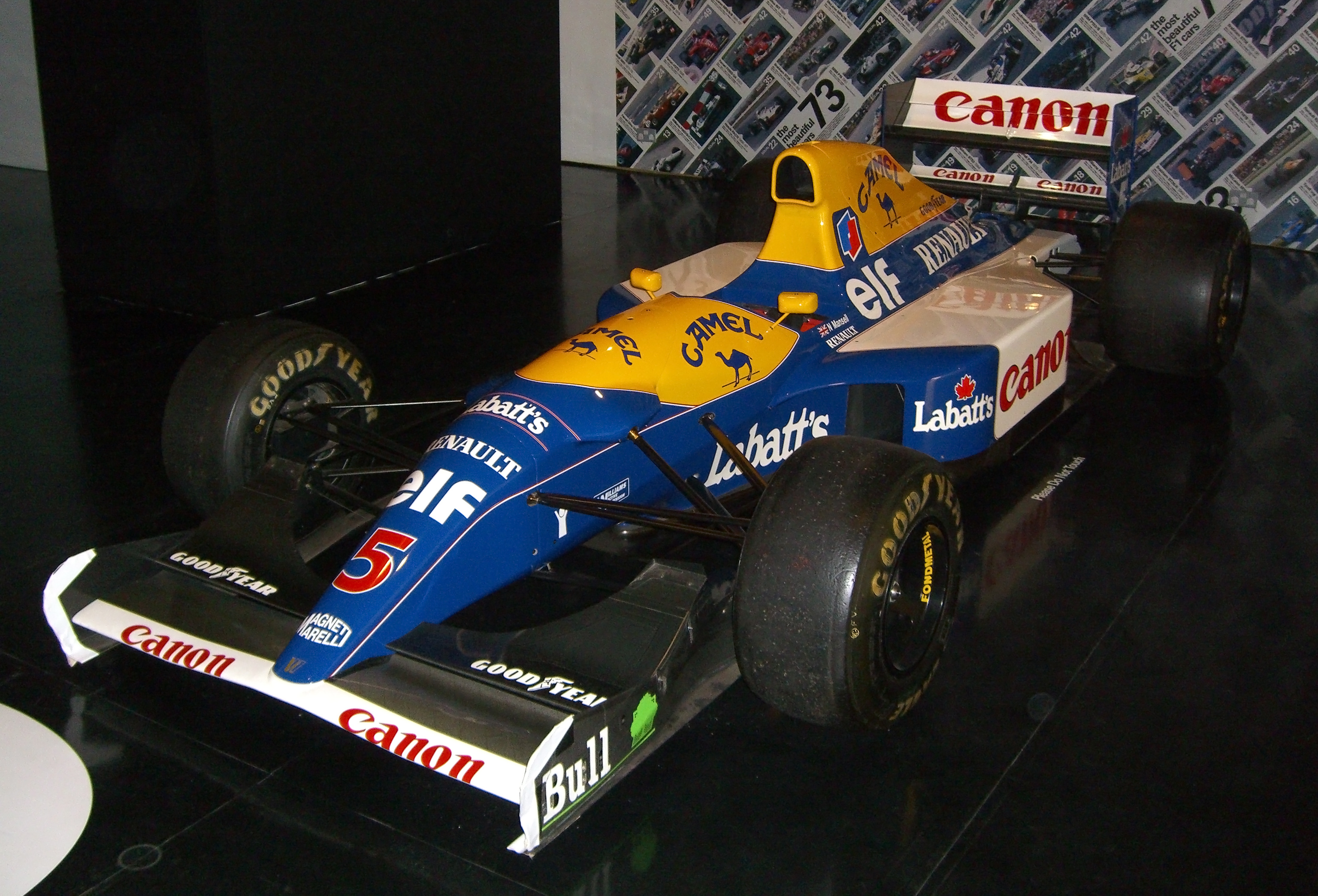
- The Williams FW14B being exhibited
- Category: Formula One
- Constructor: Williams (chassis, transmission, electronics); Renault Sport (engine)
- Designers: Patrick Head (Technical Director); Adrian Newey (Chief Designer); Paddy Lowe (Head of Special Projects); Steve Wise (Head of Electronics); Frank Dernie (Head of Chassis); Eghbal Hamidy (Chief Aerodynamicist); Bernard Dudot (Chief Engine Designer)
- Predecessor: FW13B
- Successor: FW15C

Technical specifications
- Chassis: Carbon fibre and honeycomb composite structure
- Suspension (front): 1991: Pushrod, inboard spring / dampers 1992: Active suspension
- Suspension (rear): 1991: Pushrod, inboard spring / dampers 1992: Active suspension
- Engine: 1991–1992: Renault RS3C, 3,493 cc (213.2 cu in), 67° V10, NA, mid-engine, longitudinally mounted. 1992: Renault RS4, 3,493 cc (213.2 cu in), 67° V10, NA, mid-engine, longitudinally mounted.
- Transmission: Williams 6 speed sequential semi-automatic
- Power: 700–750 bhp (522–559 kW; 710–760 PS) @ 12,500–14,500 rpm
- Fuel: Elf
- Tyres: Goodyear

Competition history
- Notable entrants: Canon Williams Team
- Notable drivers: 5. (United Kingdom) Nigel Mansell; 6. (Italy) Riccardo Patrese
- Debut: 1991 United States Grand Prix
- First win: 1991 Mexican Grand Prix
- Last win: 1992 Japanese Grand Prix
- Last event: 1992 Australian Grand Prix
Races	Wins	Podiums	Poles	F/Laps
32	17	38	21	19
- Constructors' Championships: 1 (1992)
- Drivers' Championships: 1 (1992, Nigel Mansell)

The Williams FW14 is a Formula One car designed by Adrian Newey, used by the Williams team during the 1991 and 1992 Formula One seasons. The car was driven by Nigel Mansell and Riccardo Patrese.

== Overview ==
The development of the Williams FW14 was prompted by team's underachievement in the 1989 and 1990 seasons despite being competitive. In mid-1990, Adrian Newey, a renowned aerodynamicist, joined the team and started to work on the new car. Newey had previously designed cost-effective and efficient cars for March and was now able to apply his ideas to a fully-funded project with Williams. The FW14 was a completely new design, except for the engine, and its promising performance was enough to convince Nigel Mansell to rejoin Williams from Ferrari and delay his retirement plans.

Powered by a 3.5-litre V10 Renault engine with its design and development led by Bernard Dudot, the car is considered one of the most technologically sophisticated to have competed in Formula One. By 1992 the FW14B featured semi-automatic transmission, active suspension, traction control and, for a brief period, anti-lock brakes. With the aerodynamics as designed by Newey and the active suspension invented by designer/aerodynamicist Frank Dernie, the car was far ahead of its competitors, such as the McLaren MP4/7A, Ferrari F92A or Lotus 107, and it made for a strong package. The FW14B was so successful that its successor (the initial FW15), which was available mid-season in 1992, was never used.

== Williams FW14 ==
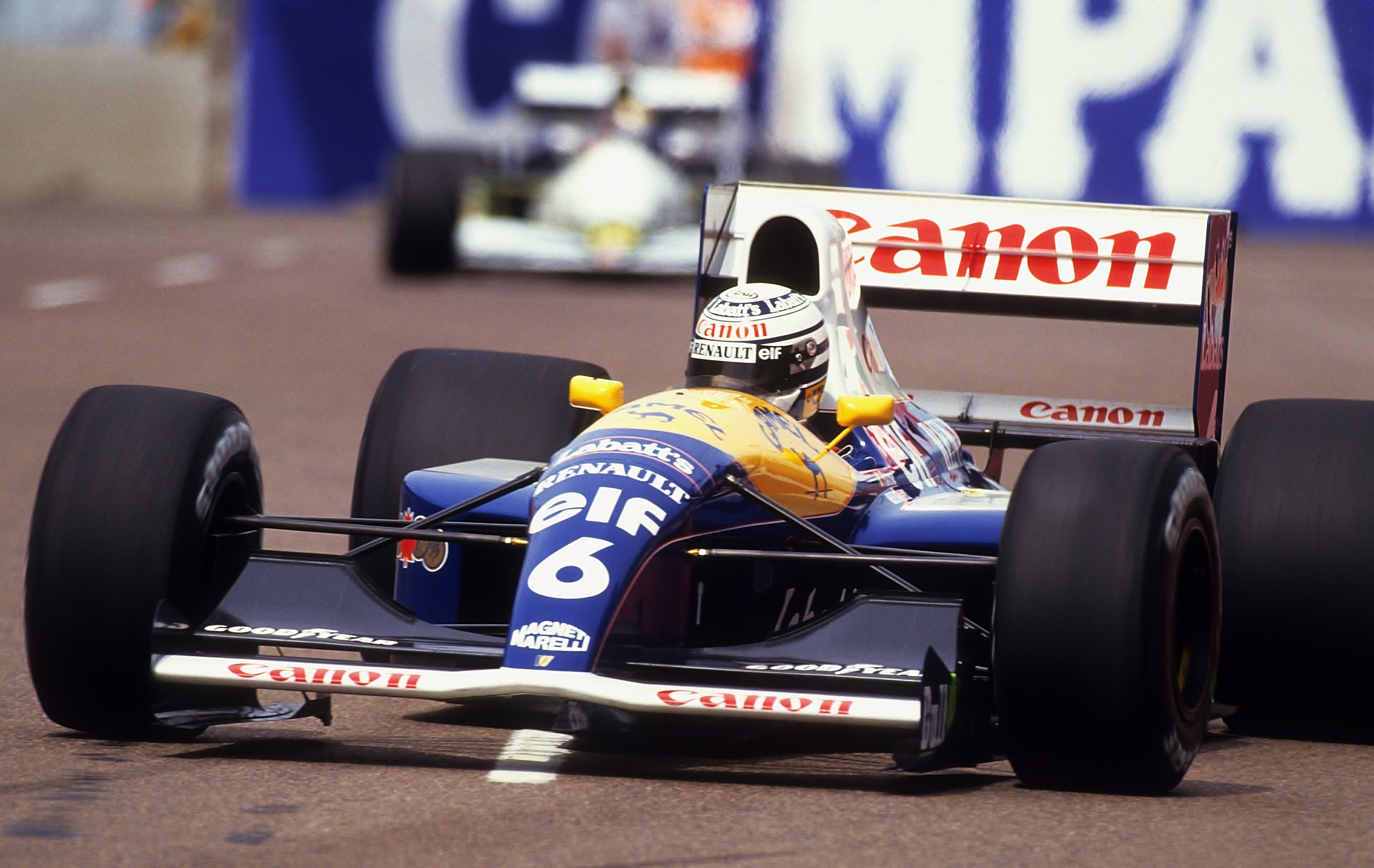
Riccardo Patrese driving the FW14 at the 1991 United States Grand Prix

The FW14 made its debut at the 1991 United States Grand Prix. The car was the most technically advanced car in competition, but various difficulties during the season stymied the team's early progress. Nigel Mansell and Riccardo Patrese recorded seven victories between them but the Drivers' Championship was wrapped up by Ayrton Senna in the McLaren MP4/6, which had better reliability.

Williams had the faster car throughout the balance of the season and it provided a run of good form in the midseason for both Mansell and Patrese. Mansell, in particular, had several retirements due to the then new-for-Williams semi-automatic transmission, with most of these retirements occurring while in a position to win races. Patrese was impressive on several occasions and retired while leading twice. McLaren's superior reliability told in the Constructors' Championship as well, as they narrowly took the title from Williams.

A total of five chassis were built.

== Williams FW14B ==
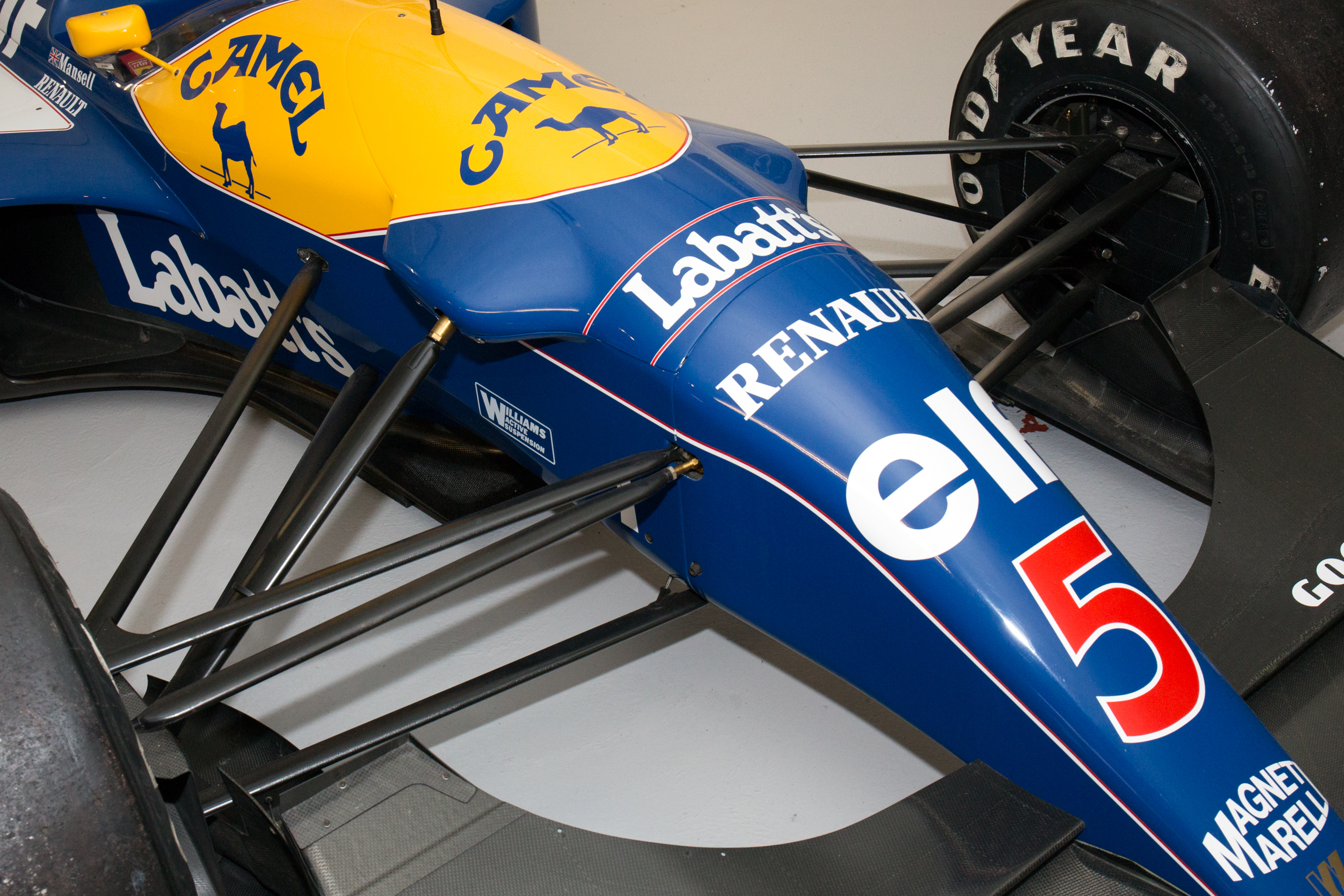
Although there is little difference in appearance between the FW14 and FW14B, the FW14B has front suspension bulges on the body due to the addition of the active suspension system.

In 1992, after further development work was done to the gearbox and aerodynamics, and electronics technology such as a traction control and active suspension system were added, the B-spec. FW14, known as the FW14B was introduced for the 1992 season. The FW14B was the dominant car that year and Mansell wrapped up the 1992 Drivers' Championship with a then-record nine wins in a season, whilst Patrese scored a further win at the Japanese Grand Prix. Patrese did not warm to the car as much as the FW14, as he preferred the passive suspension in that chassis, whereas the increased level of downforce generated by the FW14B suited Mansell's aggressive driving style much better. The main visible difference between the FW14 and FW14B were a pair of bulbous protrusions above the latter's front pushrods, which contained the active suspension technology. The FW14B also featured a longer nose section. The car had been present at the Australian Grand Prix the previous year, but Mansell had elected to use the regular FW14 in that race.

The result was there were many races in the 1992 season where Mansell and Patrese would gain two seconds per lap on the rest of the field, especially in the early laps, which made the FW14B far superior to even the next best car, the McLaren MP4/7A. Another example of Williams's dominance that year was at qualifying at the British Grand Prix at Silverstone, where Mansell's pole position-winning lap was a whole two seconds faster than Patrese, who in turn was a second faster than third placed Ayrton Senna. Williams were clear winners of the 1992 Constructors' Championship, but the season ended in acrimony as Mansell left the team after Alain Prost was signed, while Patrese moved to Benetton for his swansong season in 1993.

Both versions of the FW14 won a combined 17 Grands Prix, 21 pole positions, and 289 points before being replaced with the FW15C for 1993. Given that current F1 regulations ban many of the technologies used by the FW14B and FW15C, these are considered among the most technologically advanced racing cars to have ever raced in Formula One.

On 2 June 2017, the Williams F1 team celebrated 40 years in Formula One with a media day at Silverstone race circuit. The FW14B was driven for the first time since 1992 for a number of laps by Karun Chandhok. The car did several laps on its own around the circuit; it then performed 3 laps accompanying the 2014 Williams FW36 driven by Paul di Resta.

A total of six chassis were built. The numbering continued from the FW14, so FW14B serial numbers 6 through 11 were built.

In 2020, it was revealed that Sebastian Vettel bought Nigel Mansell's no. 5 FW14B, the same chassis that won the 1992 F1 world title.

== Cultural legacy ==
The Williams FW14B appears in the video game F1 2013 as part of the "F1 Classics" downloadable content. In May 2017, Codemasters announced that the car will appear in F1 2017 as one of the classic cars. It also appears in F1 2018, F1 2019, and F1 2020.

On 5 July 2019, the Williams FW14B chassis number FW14/8 was sold for £2,703,000 at auction by Bonhams at the 2019 Goodwood Festival of Speed.

Retired four-time Formula One World Champion Sebastian Vettel drove Nigel Mansell's Williams FW14B at the 2023 Goodwood Festival of Speed along with Ayrton Senna's McLaren MP4/8.

Scale model kits of the FW14 and FW14B have been released by companies such as Hasegawa, Tamiya and Fujimi.

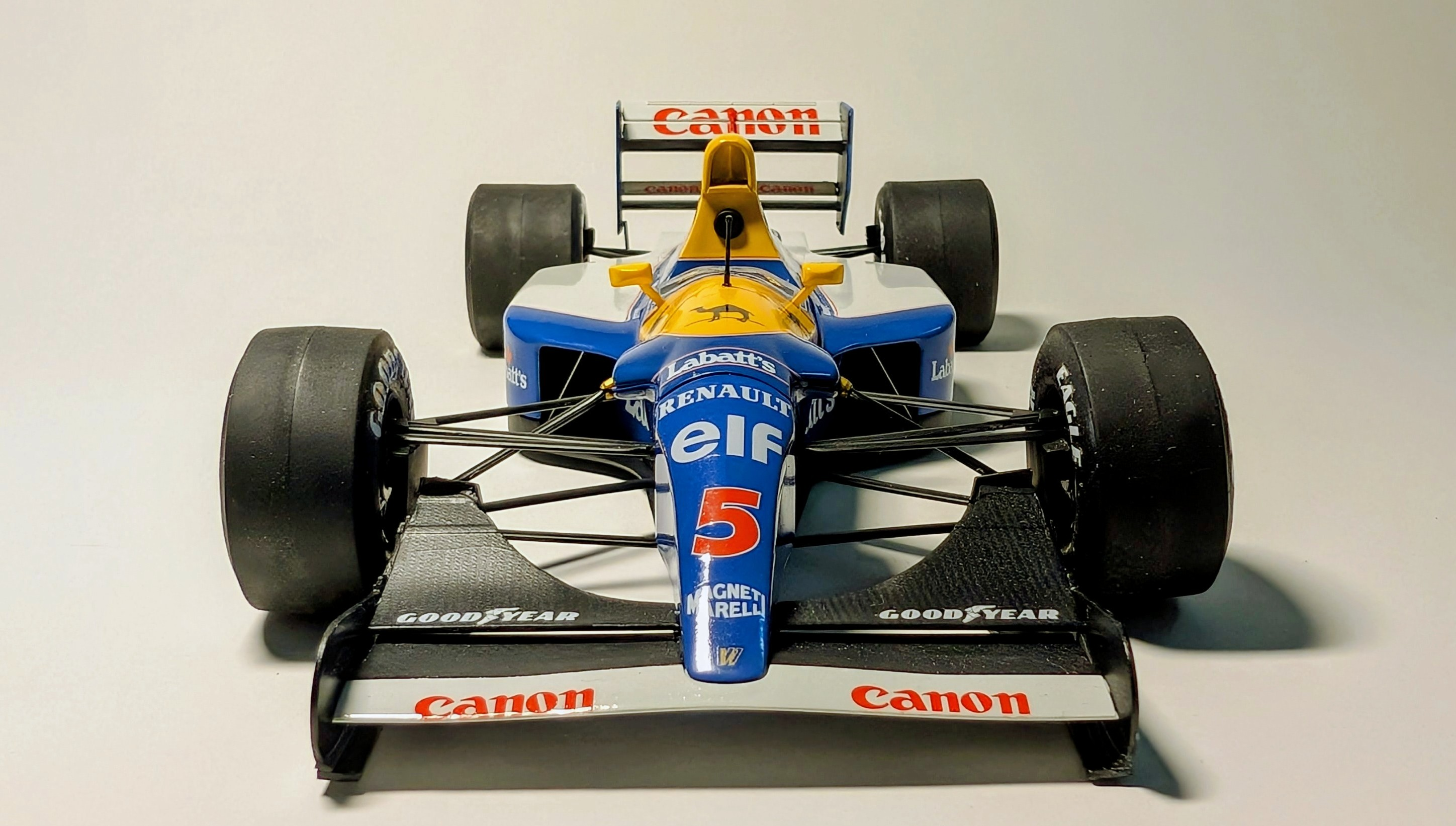
Fujimi 1/20 scale model of the 1992 Williams FW14B F1 car

The FW14B had a Lego Icons set (no. 10353) that was released on 1 March 2025. It also includes a Nigel Mansell minifigure.

== Complete Formula One results ==
(key) (results shown in bold indicate pole position; results in italics indicate fastest lap)

Year	Entrant	Chassis	Engine	Tyres	Driver	1	2	3	4	5	6	7	8	9	10	11	12	13	14	15	16	Pts.	WCC
1991	Canon Williams Team	FW14	Renault RS3C; V10	G		USA	BRA	SMR	MON	CAN	MEX	FRA	GBR	GER	HUN	BEL	ITA	POR	ESP	JPN	AUS	125	2nd
1991	Canon Williams Team	FW14	Renault RS3C; V10	G	Nigel Mansell	Ret	Ret	Ret	2	6	2	1	**1**	**1**	2	Ret	1	DSQ	1	Ret	2	125	2nd
1991	Canon Williams Team	FW14	Renault RS3C; V10	G	Riccardo Patrese	Ret	2	Ret	Ret	**3**	**1**	**5**	Ret	2	3	5	Ret	**1**	3	3	5	125	2nd
1992	Canon Williams Team	FW14B	Renault RS3C / RS4; V10	G		RSA	MEX	BRA	ESP	SMR	MON	CAN	FRA	GBR	GER	HUN	BEL	ITA	POR	JPN	AUS	164	1st
1992	Canon Williams Team	FW14B	Renault RS3C / RS4; V10	G	Nigel Mansell	**1**	**1**	**1**	**1**	**1**	**2**	Ret	**1**	**1**	**1**	2	**2**	**Ret**	**1**	**Ret**	**Ret**	164	1st
1992	Canon Williams Team	FW14B	Renault RS3C / RS4; V10	G	Riccardo Patrese	2	2	2	Ret	2	3	Ret	2	2	8	**Ret**	3	5	Ret	1	Ret	164	1st

== Sponsors ==
Brand	Country	Placed on
Canon	Japan	Sidepods, nose, front wing, rear wing
Save The Children	United Kingdom	Side
Magnetti Marelli	Italy	Nose
Renault	France	Sides, nose
Elf	France	Sides, nose
Labatt's	Canada	Sidepods, nose
Camel	United States	Fin, nose
Bull	France	Front wing end plate

Awards
Preceded by Jordan 191	Autosport; Racing Car of the Year; 1992	Succeeded by Williams FW15C
