= 1993 Australian Grand Prix =

Race 16 of 16 in the 1993 Formula One World Championship
← Previous race	Next race →

Race details
- Date: 7 November 1993
- Location: Adelaide Street Circuit; Adelaide, South Australia, Australia
- Course: Temporary street circuit
- Course length: 3.780 km (2.362 miles)
- Distance: 79 laps, 298.620 km (186.598 miles)
- Scheduled distance: 81 laps, 306.180 km (191.322 miles)
- Weather: Sunny

Pole position
Driver	(Brazil) Ayrton Senna	McLaren-Ford
- Time: 1:13.371

Fastest lap
Driver	(United Kingdom) Damon Hill	Williams-Renault
- Time: 1:15.381 on lap 64

Podium
First	(Brazil) Ayrton Senna	McLaren-Ford
Second	(France) Alain Prost	Williams-Renault
Third	(United Kingdom) Damon Hill	Williams-Renault

The 1993 Australian Grand Prix was a Formula One motor race held at Adelaide on 7 November 1993. It was the sixteenth and final race of the 1993 Formula One World Championship.

The 79-lap race was won by Brazilian Ayrton Senna, driving a McLaren-Ford. In his last race with McLaren before joining Williams for 1994, Senna took pole position and led from start to finish, except during the pit stops. Frenchman Alain Prost, in his final Grand Prix before retirement, finished second in his Williams-Renault, with his British teammate Damon Hill third.

Riccardo Patrese and Derek Warwick also retired from F1 after this race, Patrese having competed in a then-record 256 Grands Prix. Senna's victory would turn out to be the 41st and last victory in his Formula One career, and the last time he would finish on the podium, score points, or even finish a race, since the following season he retired in Interlagos and Aida and died at Imola. It was also the last win for a Brazilian driver until Rubens Barrichello at the 2000 German Grand Prix.

This race marked the last F1 Grand Prix to feature a car powered by a Lamborghini V12 engine (the Larrousse LH93).

This event was also the last race without refuelling during races (until the 2010 Bahrain Grand Prix) as well as the last race for cars with active suspension and cars using electronic driver aids; the FIA banned their use for the next seven seasons, starting in 1994, until the use of three electronic driver aid systems (namely fully-automatic gearboxes, launch control, and traction control) was eventually reintroduced and permitted at the 2001 Spanish Grand Prix, due to the FIA being unable to police the ban, and whether or not teams were secretly cheating by using these systems illegally to gain a competitive advantage, which is what led to their eventual reintroduction until the next six seasons.

By winning this race McLaren surpassed Ferrari as the most successful F1 constructor in number of wins (until the 1995 Canadian Grand Prix). McLaren achieved the final pole position and win for their car entered in the livery of Marlboro as their title sponsor, which also would be the last pole position and win for the team until the 1997 season. This race was also the last time the Williams team was sponsored by Canon and the Benetton team was sponsored by Camel before switching to sponsorship by Rothmans and Mild Seven respectively in the 1994 season.

== Report ==
=== Qualifying ===
Senna took his first pole position since the 1992 Canadian Grand Prix, in the process breaking a run of 24 straight poles for Williams and preventing that team from achieving a clean sweep for the season. Prost was alongside on the front row, with Damon Hill in the second Williams and Michael Schumacher in the Benetton on the second row, and Mika Häkkinen in the second McLaren and Gerhard Berger in the Ferrari on the third. Berger had his Saturday qualifying times removed after doing 18 laps, above the limit of 12. The top ten was completed by Jean Alesi in the second Ferrari, Martin Brundle in the Ligier, Patrese in the second Benetton, and Aguri Suzuki in the Footwork.

Despite being the fastest qualifier in his Ford V8-powered McLaren, Senna was some 15 km/h (9 mph) slower on the 890m-long Brabham Straight than the Renault V10-powered Williams of Hill.

=== Race ===
It took three attempts to get the race underway. On the first attempt, Brundle's Ligier was left on the grid at the start of the formation lap, before Ukyo Katayama stalled his Tyrrell and the start was aborted. On the second attempt, Eddie Irvine missed his grid slot and stalled his Jordan. Again, the start was aborted. Katayama and Irvine were sent to the back of the grid for the third, successful, attempt.

The top four retained their positions into the first corner, while Häkkinen made a bad start and fell behind Berger.

While Senna pulled out a small lead, the two Williams cars and Schumacher stayed together. Schumacher pitted early on lap 15 and rejoined in fourth but his engine failed on lap 20. Senna pitted on lap 24, allowing Prost to lead until his own stop five laps later, while Häkkinen's race went from bad to worse as he had a slow stop, allowing Alesi and Brundle to get ahead of him, before his brakes failed on lap 29.

Senna pitted for the second time on lap 55, by which time the Williamses had already made their second stops, and this enabled the Brazilian to retain a healthy lead. Meanwhile, Alesi got ahead of team-mate Berger while Patrese got ahead of Brundle. On lap 61, Hill tried to catch Prost by surprise for second place. Prost, however, moved over to block, causing Hill to back off and spin, losing time but no places.

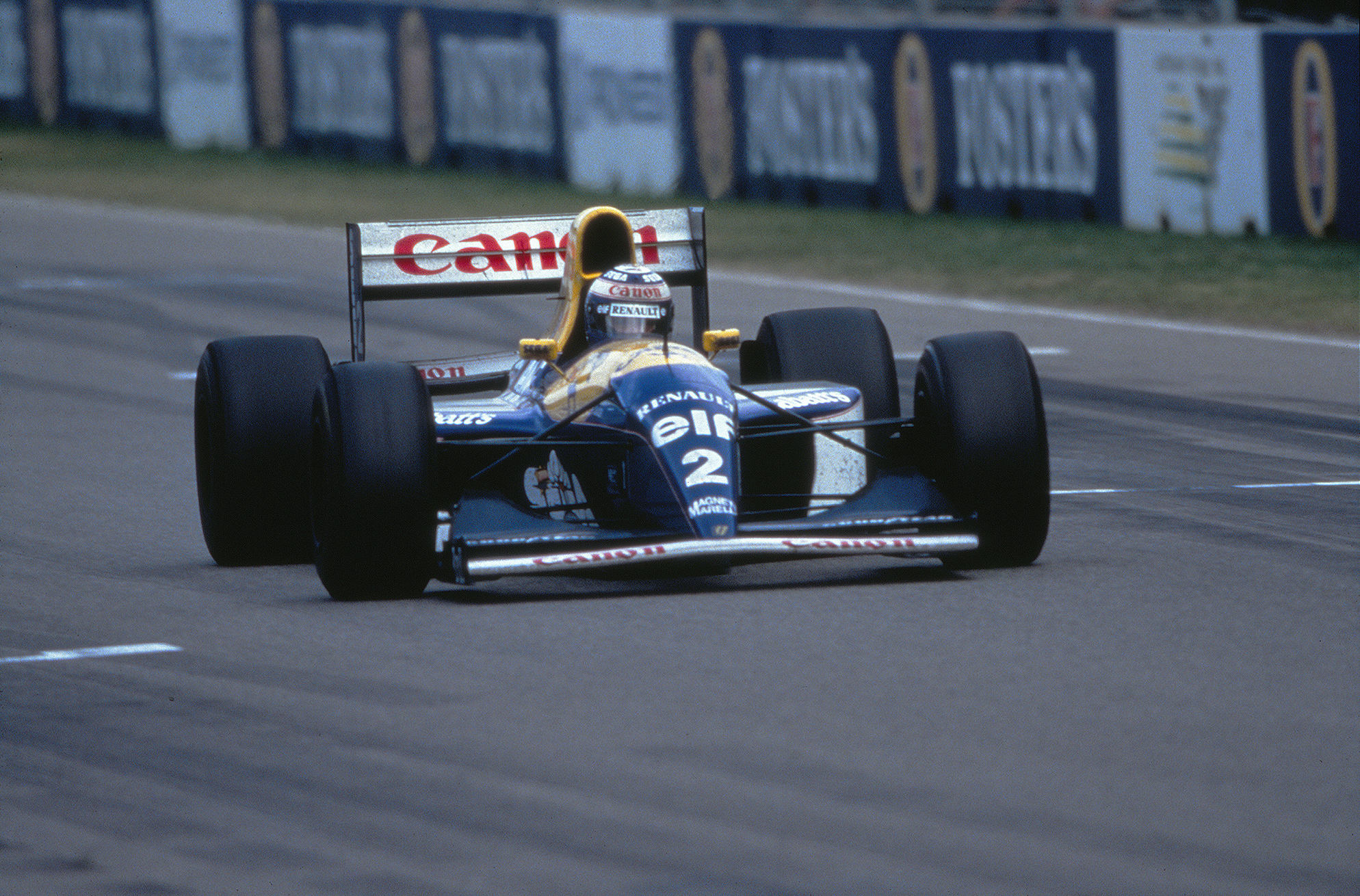
Alain Prost during the race in Adelaide on 7 November 1993.

Senna duly won from Prost by nine seconds, with Hill a further 24 seconds back. Alesi and Berger were fourth and fifth, one lap down, while Patrese was set to finish sixth in his 256th and last race, only for his fuel pressure to drop on the last lap and thus hand Brundle the last point.

Prost thus signed off on his F1 career with his fourth Drivers' Championship and 99 points. Senna's win enabled him to secure second place in the standings with 73 points, just ahead of Hill on 69. Schumacher was fourth with 52, with a big gap to team-mate Patrese in fifth with 20, followed by Alesi (16), Brundle (13), Berger (12), Johnny Herbert (11) and Mark Blundell (10). In the Constructors' Championship, Williams finished with 168 points - four more than their tally from 1992, and double the tally of McLaren (84). Benetton were a close third with 72, while Ferrari (28) edged out Ligier (23) for fourth.

With Prost not defending his title, the Williams cars would once again bear the numbers 0 and 2 for 1994.

== Post-race ==
During the podium celebrations, Senna invited Prost up to the top step, much to the surprise of the Frenchman. The move marked the first easing of tensions in the rivalry between the two men. Senna himself would later call the race 'the end of an era'. As was tradition in Adelaide, a rock concert was held inside the circuit following the race. The concert was performed by Tina Turner as part of her What's Love? Tour (the concert was free for anyone with a ticket to the race). At one point during the concert, Ayrton Senna appeared on the stage, much to Turner's surprise. As a tribute to the Brazilian driver (and although she had already performed the song), Turner sang again her hit "The Best".

== Classification ==
=== Qualifying ===
Pos	No	Driver	Constructor	Q1	Q2	Gap
1	8	(Brazil) Ayrton Senna	McLaren-Ford	1:13.371	1:14.779	—
2	2	(France) Alain Prost	Williams-Renault	1:13.807	1:14.595	+0.436
3	0	(United Kingdom) Damon Hill	Williams-Renault	1:14.721	1:13.826	+0.455
4	5	(Germany) Michael Schumacher	Benetton-Ford	1:14.098	1:14.494	+0.727
5	7	(Finland) Mika Häkkinen	McLaren-Ford	1:14.106	1:14.596	+0.735
6	28	(Austria) Gerhard Berger	Ferrari	1:14.194	—	+0.823
7	27	(France) Jean Alesi	Ferrari	1:15.332	1:15.619	+1.961
8	25	(United Kingdom) Martin Brundle	Ligier-Renault	1:16.022	1:16.710	+2.651
9	6	(Italy) Riccardo Patrese	Benetton-Ford	1:16.077	1:21.076	+2.706
10	10	(Japan) Aguri Suzuki	Footwork-Mugen-Honda	1:16.079	1:16.567	+2.708
11	29	(Austria) Karl Wendlinger	Sauber	1:16.106	1:17.132	+2.735
12	30	(Finland) JJ Lehto	Sauber	1:16.286	1:17.118	+2.915
13	14	(Brazil) Rubens Barrichello	Jordan-Hart	1:16.459	1:16.723	+3.088
14	26	(United Kingdom) Mark Blundell	Ligier-Renault	1:16.862	1:16.469	+3.098
15	4	(Italy) Andrea de Cesaris	Tyrrell-Yamaha	1:17.350	1:16.892	+3.521
16	24	(Italy) Pierluigi Martini	Minardi-Ford	1:16.905	1:17.816	+3.534
17	9	(United Kingdom) Derek Warwick	Footwork-Mugen-Honda	—	1:16.919	+3.548
18	3	(Japan) Ukyo Katayama	Tyrrell-Yamaha	1:17.018	1:18.406	+3.647
19	15	(United Kingdom) Eddie Irvine	Jordan-Hart	1:19.733	1:17.341	+3.970
20	12	(United Kingdom) Johnny Herbert	Lotus-Ford	1:17.612	1:17.450	+4.079
21	20	(France) Érik Comas	Larrousse-Lamborghini	1:17.750	1:17.815	+4.379
22	23	(France) Jean-Marc Gounon	Minardi-Ford	1:17.754	1:18.035	+4.383
23	11	(Portugal) Pedro Lamy	Lotus-Ford	1:19.628	1:19.369	+5.998
24	19	(Japan) Toshio Suzuki	Larrousse-Lamborghini	1:21.793	1:23.167	+8.422

=== Race ===
Pos	No	Driver	Constructor	Laps	Time/Retired	Grid	Points
1	8	(Brazil) Ayrton Senna	McLaren-Ford	79	1:43:27.476	1	10
2	2	(France) Alain Prost	Williams-Renault	79	+ 9.259	2	6
3	0	(United Kingdom) Damon Hill	Williams-Renault	79	+ 33.902	3	4
4	27	(France) Jean Alesi	Ferrari	78	+ 1 Lap	7	3
5	28	(Austria) Gerhard Berger	Ferrari	78	+ 1 Lap	6	2
6	25	(United Kingdom) Martin Brundle	Ligier-Renault	78	+ 1 Lap	8	1
7	10	(Japan) Aguri Suzuki	Footwork-Mugen-Honda	78	+ 1 Lap	10	
8	6	(Italy) Riccardo Patrese	Benetton-Ford	77	Fuel system	9	
9	26	(United Kingdom) Mark Blundell	Ligier-Renault	77	+ 2 Laps	14	
10	9	(United Kingdom) Derek Warwick	Footwork-Mugen-Honda	77	+ 2 Laps	17	
11	14	(Brazil) Rubens Barrichello	Jordan-Hart	76	+ 3 Laps	13	
12	20	(France) Érik Comas	Larrousse-Lamborghini	76	+ 3 Laps	21	
13	4	(Italy) Andrea de Cesaris	Tyrrell-Yamaha	75	+ 4 Laps	15	
14	19	(Japan) Toshio Suzuki	Larrousse-Lamborghini	74	+ 5 Laps	24	
15	29	(Austria) Karl Wendlinger	Sauber	73	Brakes	11	
Ret	30	(Finland) JJ Lehto	Sauber	56	Accident	12	
Ret	23	(France) Jean-Marc Gounon	Minardi-Ford	34	Spun off	22	
Ret	7	(Finland) Mika Häkkinen	McLaren-Ford	28	Brakes	5	
Ret	5	(Germany) Michael Schumacher	Benetton-Ford	19	Engine	4	
Ret	3	(Japan) Ukyo Katayama	Tyrrell-Yamaha	11	Spun Off	18	
Ret	15	(United Kingdom) Eddie Irvine	Jordan-Hart	10	Accident	19	
Ret	12	(United Kingdom) Johnny Herbert	Lotus-Ford	9	Suspension	20	
Ret	24	(Italy) Pierluigi Martini	Minardi-Ford	5	Gearbox	16	
Ret	11	(Portugal) Pedro Lamy	Lotus-Ford	0	Accident	23	

== Final championship standings ==
Drivers' Championship standings

	Pos	Driver	Points
	1	(France) **Alain Prost**	99
1	2	(Brazil) Ayrton Senna	73
1	3	(United Kingdom) Damon Hill	69
	4	(Germany) Michael Schumacher	52
	5	(Italy) Riccardo Patrese	20

Constructors' Championship standings

Pos	Constructor	Points
1	(United Kingdom) **Williams-Renault**	168
2	(United Kingdom) McLaren-Ford	84
3	(United Kingdom) Benetton-Ford	72
4	(Italy) Ferrari	28
5	(France) Ligier-Renault	23

- Note: Only the top five positions are included for both sets of standings.
- **Bold text** indicates the 1993 World Champions.

Previous race: 1993 Japanese Grand Prix	FIA Formula One World Championship; 1993 season	Next race: 1994 Brazilian Grand Prix
Previous race: 1992 Australian Grand Prix	Australian Grand Prix	Next race: 1994 Australian Grand Prix
