= Honda V12 engine =

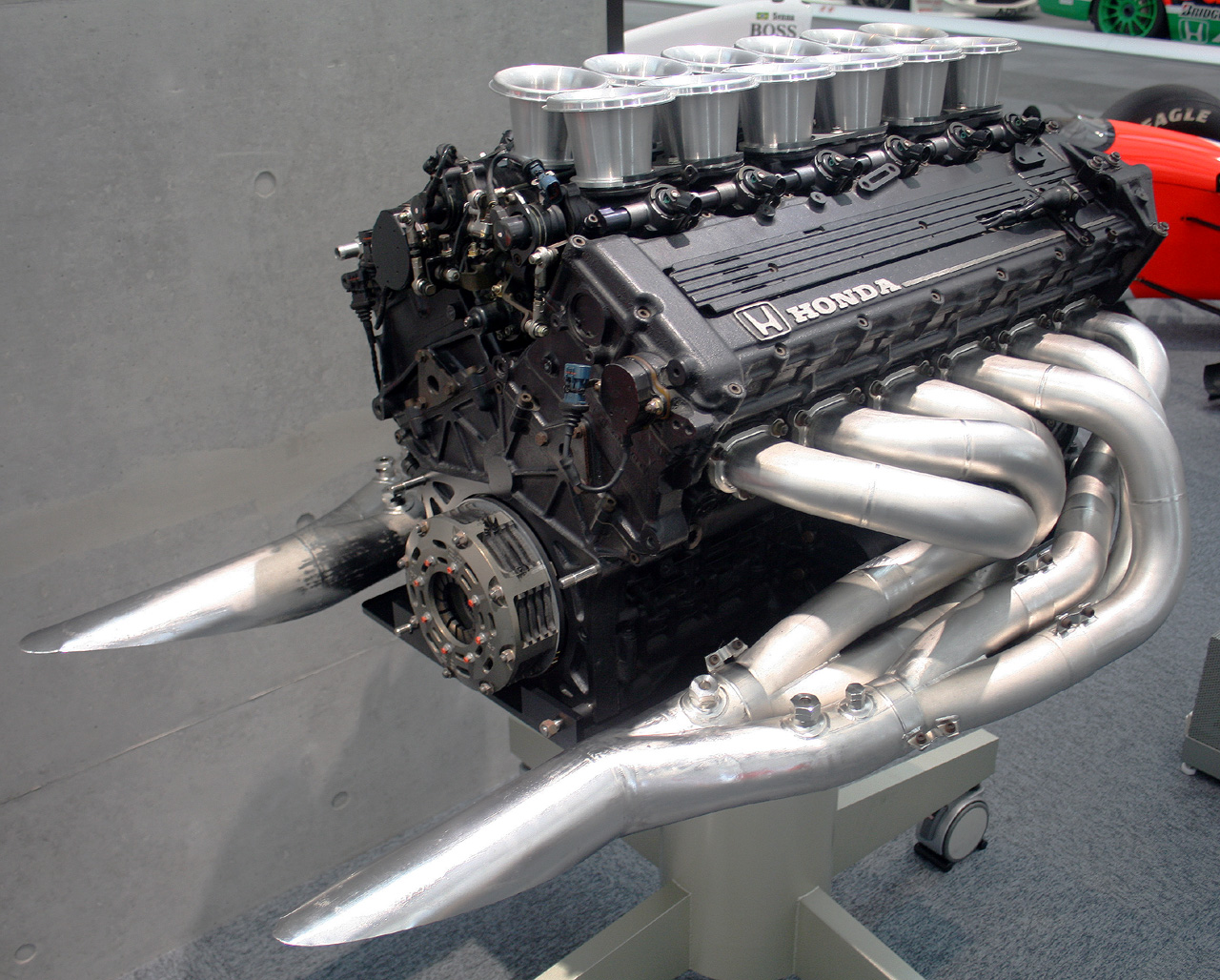

Overview
- Manufacturer: (Japan) Honda
- Designer: Yoshio Nakamura (1964–1968); Osamu Goto (1991–1992)
- Production: 1964–1968, 1991–1992

Layout
- Configuration: 1964–1968: 60°-90° V12; 1991–1992: 60°-75° V12
- Displacement: 1.5 L (1,495 cc); 3.0 L (2,993 cc); 3.5 L (3,498 cc); 3.5 L (3,496 cc)
- Cylinder bore: 58.1 mm (2.3 in); 78 mm (3.1 in); 86.5 mm (3.4 in); 88 mm (3.5 in)
- Piston stroke: 47 mm (1.9 in); 52.2 mm (2.1 in); 49.6 mm (2.0 in); 47.9 mm (1.9 in)
- Valvetrain: 48-valve, DOHC, four-valves per cylinder
- Compression ratio: 12.0:1-12.9:1

Combustion
- Fuel system: Carburetor; Electronic fuel injection
- Fuel type: Gasoline
- Cooling system: Water-cooled

Output
- Power output: 210–800 PS (154–588 kW; 207–789 hp)
- Torque output: 150–500 N⋅m (111–369 lb⋅ft)

Dimensions
- Dry weight: 120–160 kg (264.6–352.7 lb)

Chronology
- Predecessor: Honda RA16 engine
- Successor: Honda V10 engine

Honda has made a number of naturally-aspirated V12 engines designed for Formula One motor racing; starting with the 1.5-litre RA271E engine in 1964, and ending with the 3.0-litre RA273E in 1968. This would be followed by a 21-year hiatus, until Honda reintroduced the new 3.5-litre RA121E in 1991. The RA121E would go down as the last V12 engine to win a Formula One World Championship. Honda's last-ever V12 engine, the RA122E/B, raced in 1992.

== Applications ==
- Honda RA271
- Honda RA272
- Honda RA273
- Honda RA300
- Honda RA301
- RC-F1 1.0X (RC100) / RC-F1 1.5X (RC101) (prototypes; never raced)
- McLaren MP4/6
- McLaren MP4/7A

== Grand Prix engine results ==
- 1 World Constructors' Championship.
- 1 World Drivers' Championship.
- 15 race wins.
- 12 pole positions.
- 35 podium finishes

== See also ==
- Yamaha F1 engine
- Ferrari V12 F1 engine
- Lamborghini LE3512
- Subaru 1235
- Life Racing Engines
- Porsche 3512
