= 1993 Japanese Grand Prix =

- Race 15 of 16 in the 1993 Formula One World Championship

Race details
- Date: 24 October 1993
- Official name: XIX Fuji Television Japanese Grand Prix
- Location: Suzuka Circuit; Suzuka, Japan
- Course: Permanent racing facility
- Course length: 5.860 km (3.641 miles)
- Distance: 53 laps, 310.580 km (192.985 miles)
- Weather: Dry/wet, warm, cloudy
- Attendance: 350,000

Pole position
Driver	(France) Alain Prost	Williams-Renault
- Time: 1:37.154

Fastest lap
Driver	(France) Alain Prost	Williams-Renault
- Time: 1:41.176 on lap 53

Podium
First	(Brazil) Ayrton Senna	McLaren-Ford
Second	(France) Alain Prost	Williams-Renault
Third	(Finland) Mika Häkkinen	McLaren-Ford

The 1993 Japanese Grand Prix (formally the XIX Fuji Television Japanese Grand Prix) was a Formula One motor race held at Suzuka on 24 October 1993. It was the fifteenth and penultimate race of the 1993 Formula One World Championship.

The 53-lap race was won by Ayrton Senna, driving a McLaren-Ford, after he started from second position. Alain Prost finished second in a Williams-Renault, having started from pole position, while Senna's teammate Mika Häkkinen came third, achieving his first podium finish.

Jordan drivers Rubens Barrichello and Eddie Irvine (the latter making his F1 debut) scored their first points by finishing fifth and sixth respectively. Irvine was subsequently punched by Senna for unlapping himself during the race. Two other drivers made their F1 debuts at this race, Jean-Marc Gounon and Toshio Suzuki. Only 24 cars were entered, following the withdrawal of the BMS Scuderia Italia team from F1 in the run-up to the race.

== Report ==
=== Qualifying ===
Prost took the final pole of his career ahead of Senna, Häkkinen, Schumacher, Berger and Hill.

=== Race ===
At the start, Senna got ahead of Prost while Berger took Schumacher. Eddie Irvine, the fifth occupant of the second Jordan this year, then got by both Schumacher and Hill. Hill briefly passed Schumacher in the esses but Schumacher retook the position. The order was: Senna, Prost, Häkkinen, Berger, Irvine and Schumacher. Schumacher would pass Irvine on lap 2 with Hill getting ahead two laps later.

Schumacher and Hill then closed in on Berger. At the end of lap 9, the three came out of the final chicane nose to tail and Hill passed Schumacher on the start/finish straight to take 5th place away. On lap 11, Hill got a run on Berger coming out of the 130R and Berger took the inside line going into the chicane. Hill tried to pass on the outside but was not able to complete the move. Schumacher, having stayed to the inside, couldn't stop fast enough as Hill turned in behind Berger and hit Hill's right rear wheel, damaging his left front suspension and putting himself out. Hill was able to keep going and inherited 4th on the next lap when Berger came in for tyres.

Meanwhile, Prost inherited the lead when Senna pitted for tyres. Shortly after it began to rain, which was an advantage for Prost and other drivers who had not yet stopped for tyres since they would have to make one less stop. Senna began to catch Prost as the track got wetter and on lap 21, as the rain intensified, Senna passed Prost on the approach to the Spoon curve. At the end of the lap, Senna was two seconds in front and the two both pitted for wets. Senna pulled away rapidly in the wet conditions, building over a 30-second lead by lap 27. Prost then went off at the first corner but was able to rejoin without losing time to Senna, who was delayed by traffic. The rain then stopped and drivers began coming in for slick tyres as the track began to dry. Hill rejoined after his pit stop nearly a lap down to Senna, who was still on wets. Unable to lap Hill, Senna was re-passed by Irvine, who had been lapped but was chasing Hill for 4th position. Irvine, who was also still on wets, challenged Hill in the first corner but was not able to make the pass stick while Senna waited behind to lap the pair. Senna lost 15 seconds to Prost by the time he forced his way back past Irvine and Hill let him through. At the end of lap 42, after he and Prost had made their pit stops for slicks, Senna's lead was back up to 24 seconds. With only 12 laps remaining, Prost never challenged after that and settled for second. Häkkinen's 3rd place was his first podium finish.

Behind, Barrichello had got Irvine during the stops for wets and then Berger's engine failed on lap 41. With 4 laps to go and battling with Derek Warwick for 6th, Irvine ran into the back of Warwick under braking on the approach to the chicane and knocked him out of the race. Irvine was able to continue and finish with a point in his first grand prix. Irvine's debut was slightly marred in a post-race altercation with Ayrton Senna who punched him when a discussion between the pair got heated. The incident led to rumours of Senna receiving a two-race ban, but ultimately, no penalty was issued.

Senna won ahead of Prost, Häkkinen, Hill, Barrichello and Irvine. This was the only time Prost, Senna and Häkkinen shared the podium together. Fastest lap of the race was set by Prost, the last of his career.

== Classification ==
=== Qualifying ===
Pos	No	Driver	Constructor	Q1	Q2	Gap
1	2	(France) Alain Prost	Williams-Renault	1:38.587	1:37.154	
2	8	(Brazil) Ayrton Senna	McLaren-Ford	1:38.942	1:37.284	+0.130
3	7	(Finland) Mika Häkkinen	McLaren-Ford	1:38.813	1:37.326	+0.162
4	5	(Germany) Michael Schumacher	Benetton-Ford	1:38.589	1:37.530	+0.376
5	28	(Austria) Gerhard Berger	Ferrari	1:39.024	1:37.622	+0.468
6	0	(United Kingdom) Damon Hill	Williams-Renault	1:38.979	1:38.352	+1.198
7	9	(United Kingdom) Derek Warwick	Footwork-Mugen-Honda	1:41.086	1:38.780	+1.626
8	15	(United Kingdom) Eddie Irvine	Jordan-Hart	1:41.018	1:38.966	+1.812
9	10	(Japan) Aguri Suzuki	Footwork-Mugen-Honda	1:41.380	1:39.278	+2.124
10	6	(Italy) Riccardo Patrese	Benetton-Ford	1:40.748	1:39.291	+2.137
11	30	(Finland) JJ Lehto	Sauber	1:40.346	1:39.391	+2.237
12	14	(Brazil) Rubens Barrichello	Jordan-Hart	1:41.624	1:39.426	+2.272
13	3	(Japan) Ukyo Katayama	Tyrrell-Yamaha	1:40.963	1:39.511	+2.357
14	27	(France) Jean Alesi	Ferrari	1:39.535	2:44.132	+2.381
15	25	(United Kingdom) Martin Brundle	Ligier-Renault	1:41.543	1:39.951	+2.797
16	29	(Austria) Karl Wendlinger	Sauber	1:41.367	1:40.153	+2.999
17	26	(United Kingdom) Mark Blundell	Ligier-Renault	1:41.278	1:40.696	+3.542
18	4	(Italy) Andrea de Cesaris	Tyrrell-Yamaha	1:41.480	1:40.696	+3.542
19	12	(United Kingdom) Johnny Herbert	Lotus-Ford	1:41.488	3:41.040	+4.334
20	11	(Portugal) Pedro Lamy	Lotus-Ford	1:43.165	1:41.600	+4.446
21	20	(France) Érik Comas	Larrousse-Lamborghini	1:43.483	1:41.769	+4.615
22	24	(Italy) Pierluigi Martini	Minardi-Ford	1:42.388	1:41.989	+4.835
23	19	(Japan) Toshio Suzuki	Larrousse-Lamborghini	1:44.562	1:42.175	+5.021
24	23	(France) Jean-Marc Gounon	Minardi-Ford	1:46.782	1:43.812	+6.658

=== Race ===
Pos	No	Driver	Constructor	Laps	Time/Retired	Grid	Points
1	8	(Brazil) Ayrton Senna	McLaren-Ford	53	1:40:27.912	2	10
2	2	(France) Alain Prost	Williams-Renault	53	+ 11.435	1	6
3	7	(Finland) Mika Häkkinen	McLaren-Ford	53	+ 26.129	3	4
4	0	(United Kingdom) Damon Hill	Williams-Renault	53	+ 1:23.538	6	3
5	14	(Brazil) Rubens Barrichello	Jordan-Hart	53	+ 1:35.101	12	2
6	15	(United Kingdom) Eddie Irvine	Jordan-Hart	53	+ 1:46.421	8	1
7	26	(United Kingdom) Mark Blundell	Ligier-Renault	52	+ 1 Lap	17	
8	30	(Finland) JJ Lehto	Sauber	52	+ 1 Lap	11	
9	25	(United Kingdom) Martin Brundle	Ligier-Renault	51	+ 2 Laps	15	
10	24	(Italy) Pierluigi Martini	Minardi-Ford	51	+ 2 Laps	22	
11	12	(United Kingdom) Johnny Herbert	Lotus-Ford	51	+ 2 Laps	19	
12	19	(Japan) Toshio Suzuki	Larrousse-Lamborghini	51	+ 2 Laps	23	
13	11	(Portugal) Pedro Lamy	Lotus-Ford	49	Accident	20	
14	9	(United Kingdom) Derek Warwick	Footwork-Mugen-Honda	48	Collision	7	
Ret	6	(Italy) Riccardo Patrese	Benetton-Ford	45	Accident	10	
Ret	28	(Austria) Gerhard Berger	Ferrari	40	Engine	5	
Ret	10	(Japan) Aguri Suzuki	Footwork-Mugen-Honda	28	Spun Off	9	
Ret	23	(France) Jean-Marc Gounon	Minardi-Ford	26	Withdrew	24	
Ret	3	(Japan) Ukyo Katayama	Tyrrell-Yamaha	26	Engine	13	
Ret	29	(Austria) Karl Wendlinger	Sauber	25	Engine	16	
Ret	20	(France) Érik Comas	Larrousse-Lamborghini	17	Engine	21	
Ret	5	(Germany) Michael Schumacher	Benetton-Ford	10	Collision	4	
Ret	27	(France) Jean Alesi	Ferrari	7	Engine	14	
Ret	4	(Italy) Andrea de Cesaris	Tyrrell-Yamaha	0	Collision	18	

== Championship standings after the race ==
Drivers' Championship standings

Pos	Driver	Points
1	(France) **Alain Prost**	93
2	(United Kingdom) Damon Hill	65
3	(Brazil) Ayrton Senna	63
4	(Germany) Michael Schumacher	52
5	(Italy) Riccardo Patrese	20

Constructors' Championship standings

	Pos	Constructor	Points
	1	(United Kingdom) **Williams-Renault**	158
1	2	(United Kingdom) McLaren-Ford	74
1	3	(United Kingdom) Benetton-Ford	72
	4	(Italy) Ferrari	23
	5	(France) Ligier-Renault	22

- Note: Only the top five positions are included for both sets of standings.
- **Bold text** indicates the 1993 World Champions.

Previous race: 1993 Portuguese Grand Prix	FIA Formula One World Championship; 1993 season	Next race: 1993 Australian Grand Prix
Previous race: 1992 Japanese Grand Prix	Japanese Grand Prix	Next race: 1994 Japanese Grand Prix
