= 1992 Japanese Grand Prix =

- Race 15 of 16 in the 1992 Formula One World Championship

Race details
- Date: 25 October 1992
- Official name: XVIII Fuji Television Japanese Grand Prix
- Location: Suzuka Circuit, Suzuka, Japan
- Course: Permanent racing facility
- Course length: 5.860 km (3.641 miles)
- Distance: 53 laps, 310.580 km (192.985 miles)
- Weather: Dry, warm, cloudy
- Attendance: 332,000

Pole position
Driver	(United Kingdom) Nigel Mansell	Williams-Renault
- Time: 1:37.360

Fastest lap
Driver	(United Kingdom) Nigel Mansell	Williams-Renault
- Time: 1:40.646 on lap 44

Podium
First	(Italy) Riccardo Patrese	Williams-Renault
Second	(Austria) Gerhard Berger	McLaren-Honda
Third	(United Kingdom) Martin Brundle	Benetton-Ford

The 1992 Japanese Grand Prix (formally the XVIII Fuji Television Japanese Grand Prix) was a Formula One motor race held at Suzuka on 25 October 1992. It was the fifteenth race of the 1992 Formula One World Championship.

The 53-lap race was won by Italian driver Riccardo Patrese, driving a Williams-Renault. It was Patrese's sixth and final Grand Prix victory, and the last win for an Italian driver for over a decade, until Giancarlo Fisichella won the 2003 Brazilian Grand Prix. Austrian Gerhard Berger finished second in a McLaren-Honda, with Englishman Martin Brundle third in a Benetton-Ford.

== Pre-race ==
Two driver changes took place before the race: Ferrari replaced Ivan Capelli with their test driver Nicola Larini, while Karl Wendlinger left March to join Sauber's preparatory program ahead of the Swiss team's debut in 1993. His place was taken by Jan Lammers, making his first F1 start for over 10 years.

== Qualifying ==
=== Qualifying report ===
In qualifying, Williams' Nigel Mansell took his 13th pole position of the season, equalling the record set by Ayrton Senna in 1988 and 1989. Team-mate Riccardo Patrese was alongside him on the front row, while the McLarens of Senna and Gerhard Berger filled the second row. Michael Schumacher in the Benetton was fifth, followed by the two Lotuses of Johnny Herbert and Mika Häkkinen. The top ten was completed by Érik Comas in the Ligier, Andrea de Cesaris in the Tyrrell and Thierry Boutsen in the second Ligier.

=== Qualifying classification ===
Pos	No	Driver	Constructor	Q1	Q2	Gap
1	5	(United Kingdom) Nigel Mansell	Williams-Renault	1:37.360	2:07.703	no time
2	6	(Italy) Riccardo Patrese	Williams-Renault	1:38.219	2:13.971	+0.859
3	1	(Brazil) Ayrton Senna	McLaren-Honda	1:38.375	no time	+1.015
4	2	(Austria) Gerhard Berger	McLaren-Honda	1:40.296	no time	+2.936
5	19	(Germany) Michael Schumacher	Benetton-Ford	1:40.922	11:12.418	+3.562
6	12	(United Kingdom) Johnny Herbert	Lotus-Ford	1:41.030	no time	+3.670
7	11	(Finland) Mika Häkkinen	Lotus-Ford	1:41.415	no time	+4.055
8	26	(France) Érik Comas	Ligier-Renault	1:42.187	no time	+4.827
9	4	(Italy) Andrea de Cesaris	Tyrrell-Ilmor	1:42.361	no time	+5.001
10	25	(Belgium) Thierry Boutsen	Ligier-Renault	1:42.428	no time	+5.068
11	28	(Italy) Nicola Larini	Ferrari	1:42.488	no time	+5.128
12	23	(Brazil) Christian Fittipaldi	Minardi-Lamborghini	1:42.617	no time	+5.257
13	20	(United Kingdom) Martin Brundle	Benetton-Ford	1:42.626	no time	+5.266
14	24	(Italy) Gianni Morbidelli	Minardi-Lamborghini	1:42.627	2:10.260	+5.267
15	27	(France) Jean Alesi	Ferrari	1:42.824	no time	+5.464
16	10	(Japan) Aguri Suzuki	Footwork-Mugen-Honda	1:43.029	no time	+5.669
17	32	(Italy) Stefano Modena	Jordan-Yamaha	1:43.117	2:19.944	+5.757
18	29	(France) Bertrand Gachot	Venturi-Lamborghini	1:43.156	no time	+5.796
19	22	(Italy) Pierluigi Martini	Dallara-Ferrari	1:43.251	no time	+5.891
20	30	(Japan) Ukyo Katayama	Venturi-Lamborghini	1:43.488	5:40.775	+6.128
21	3	(France) Olivier Grouillard	Tyrrell-Ilmor	1:43.941	no time	+6.581
22	21	(Finland) JJ Lehto	Dallara-Ferrari	1:44.037	no time	+6.677
23	16	(Netherlands) Jan Lammers	March-Ilmor	1:44.075	no time	+6.715
24	9	(Italy) Michele Alboreto	Footwork-Mugen-Honda	1:44.149	2:25.413	+6.789
25	33	(Brazil) Maurício Gugelmin	Jordan-Yamaha	1:44.253	no time	+6.893
26	17	(Italy) Emanuele Naspetti	March-Ilmor	1:47.303	no time	+9.943

== Race ==
=== Race report ===
Mansell made a fast start and at the end of the first lap led Patrese by three seconds. Senna held on to third before becoming the race's first retirement on lap 3 with an engine failure. Meanwhile, Larini, who had qualified 11th, stalled on the grid and fell to last, while Boutsen's gearbox failed on lap 4. Olivier Grouillard in the second Tyrrell spun off and crashed at Spoon curve on lap 7.

Berger made an early pit stop and rejoined the race in sixth place, behind Schumacher and the two Lotuses. On lap 13, Schumacher retired with gearbox failure, his only mechanical retirement of the year; Herbert's gearbox also failed two laps later. After the mid-race pit stops for tyres, Mansell retained a comfortable lead over Patrese, while Berger moved ahead of Häkkinen into third and Martin Brundle, who had only qualified 13th in the second Benetton, moved up to fifth ahead of Comas and de Cesaris. Maurício Gugelmin in the second Jordan had also spun off the track and crashed at 130R leaving debris on the track by lap 23.

On lap 36, Mansell slowed and Patrese moved ahead. The following lap, Comas retired with an engine failure. The two Venturi Larousse cars collided at the chicanes as they were both on lap 40 at the time as Bertrand Gachot hit his Japanese teammate Ukyo Katayama and went off into the gravel trap, who managed to carry on and pit in for fresh tyres (despite making contact). On lap 45, both Mansell and Häkkinen suffered engine failures of their own; this moved Berger and Brundle into second and third respectively. Patrese cruised to his sixth and final Grand Prix victory, finishing 13 seconds ahead of Berger with Brundle a further minute back; the top six was completed by de Cesaris, Jean Alesi in the second Ferrari and Christian Fittipaldi, who scored his first point in Formula One and the only point of the season for the Minardi team.

=== Race classification ===
Pos	No	Driver	Constructor	Laps	Time/Retired	Grid	Points
1	6	(Italy) Riccardo Patrese	Williams-Renault	53	1:33:09.533	2	10
2	2	(Austria) Gerhard Berger	McLaren-Honda	53	+ 13.729	4	6
3	20	(United Kingdom) Martin Brundle	Benetton-Ford	53	+ 1:15.503	13	4
4	4	(Italy) Andrea de Cesaris	Tyrrell-Ilmor	52	+ 1 lap	9	3
5	27	(France) Jean Alesi	Ferrari	52	+ 1 lap	15	2
6	23	(Brazil) Christian Fittipaldi	Minardi-Lamborghini	52	+ 1 lap	12	1
7	32	(Italy) Stefano Modena	Jordan-Yamaha	52	+ 1 lap	17	
8	10	(Japan) Aguri Suzuki	Footwork-Mugen-Honda	52	+ 1 lap	16	
9	21	(Finland) JJ Lehto	Dallara-Ferrari	52	+ 1 lap	22	
10	22	(Italy) Pierluigi Martini	Dallara-Ferrari	52	+ 1 lap	19	
11	30	(Japan) Ukyo Katayama	Venturi-Lamborghini	52	+ 1 lap	20	
12	28	(Italy) Nicola Larini	Ferrari	52	+ 1 lap	11	
13	17	(Italy) Emanuele Naspetti	March-Ilmor	51	+ 2 laps	26	
14	24	(Italy) Gianni Morbidelli	Minardi-Lamborghini	51	+ 2 laps	14	
15	9	(Italy) Michele Alboreto	Footwork-Mugen-Honda	51	+ 2 laps	24	
Ret	5	(United Kingdom) Nigel Mansell	Williams-Renault	44	Engine	1	
Ret	11	(Finland) Mika Häkkinen	Lotus-Ford	44	Engine	7	
Ret	29	(France) Bertrand Gachot	Venturi-Lamborghini	39	Collision/Spun off	18	
Ret	26	(France) Érik Comas	Ligier-Renault	36	Engine	8	
Ret	16	(Netherlands) Jan Lammers	March-Ilmor	27	Clutch	23	
Ret	33	(Brazil) Maurício Gugelmin	Jordan-Yamaha	22	Spun off	25	
Ret	12	(United Kingdom) Johnny Herbert	Lotus-Ford	15	Gearbox	6	
Ret	19	(Germany) Michael Schumacher	Benetton-Ford	13	Gearbox	5	
Ret	3	(France) Olivier Grouillard	Tyrrell-Ilmor	6	Spun off	21	
Ret	25	(Belgium) Thierry Boutsen	Ligier-Renault	3	Gearbox	10	
Ret	1	(Brazil) Ayrton Senna	McLaren-Honda	2	Engine	3	

== Championship standings after the race ==
Drivers' Championship standings

	Pos	Driver	Points
	1	(United Kingdom) **Nigel Mansell**	108
2	2	(Italy) Riccardo Patrese	56
1	3	(Brazil) Ayrton Senna	50
1	4	(Germany) Michael Schumacher	47
	5	(Austria) Gerhard Berger	39

Constructors' Championship standings

Pos	Constructor	Points
1	(United Kingdom) **Williams-Renault**	164
2	(United Kingdom) McLaren-Honda	89
3	(United Kingdom) Benetton-Ford	81
4	(Italy) Ferrari	18
5	(United Kingdom) Lotus-Ford	13

- Note: Only the top five positions are included for both sets of standings.
- **Bold text** indicates the 1992 World Champions.

Previous race: 1992 Portuguese Grand Prix	FIA Formula One World Championship; 1992 season	Next race: 1992 Australian Grand Prix
Previous race: 1991 Japanese Grand Prix	Japanese Grand Prix	Next race: 1993 Japanese Grand Prix
