= McLaren MP4/8 =

1993 Formula One racing car by McLaren

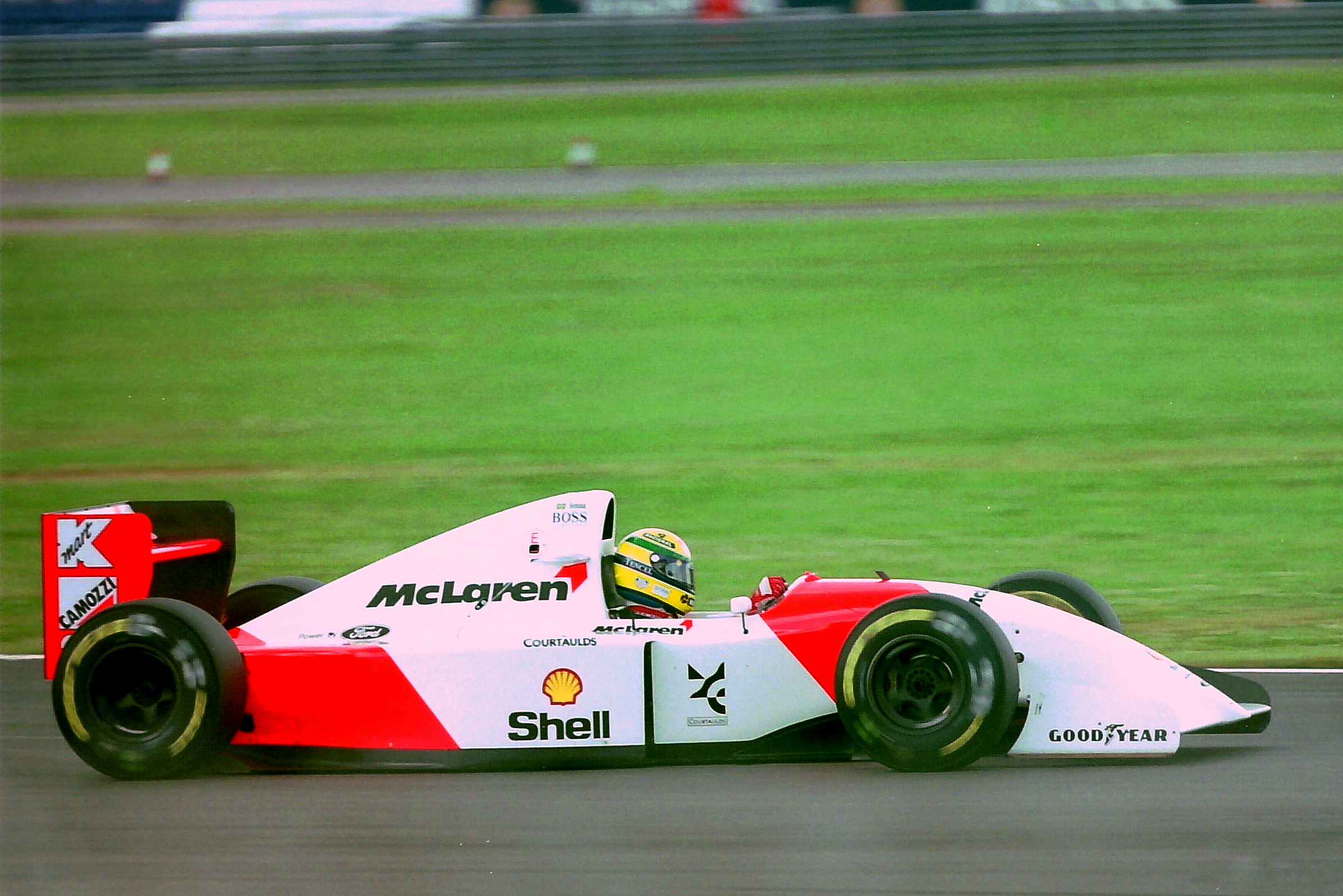
- Ayrton Senna driving the MP4/8 at the 1993 British Grand Prix
- Category: Formula One
- Constructor: McLaren
- Designers: Neil Oatley (Executive Engineer); Matthew Jeffreys (Head of Vehicle Design); David North (Head of Transmission); David Neilson (Head of Suspension); Dieter Gundel (Head of Systems Engineering); Bob Bell (Head of R&D); Henri Durand (Head of Aerodynamics); Geoff Goddard (Chief Engine Designer) (Ford-Cosworth)
- Predecessor: MP4/7A
- Successor: MP4/9

Technical specifications
- Chassis: Carbon fibre and honeycomb composite structure
- Suspension (front): Double wishbones, pushrod, inboard spring / damper / actuator
- Suspension (rear): Double wishbones, pushrod, inboard spring / damper / actuator
- Axle track: Front: 1,690 mm (67 in); Rear: 1,615 mm (63.6 in)
- Wheelbase: 2,845 mm (112.0 in)
- Engine: Ford HBD7, 3,494 cc (213.2 cu in), 75° V8 NA (max: 13700 rpm and 14300 rpm for MP4/8B (V12)) mid-engine, longitudinally mounted,
- Transmission: McLaren transverse 6-speed semi-automatic sequential
- Power: 640–730 hp (477.2–544.4 kW) @ 13,200 rpm 500–650 newton-metres (370–480 lbf⋅ft) @ 8,850 rpm
- Weight: 505 kg (1,113 lb)
- Fuel: Shell
- Tyres: Goodyear

Competition history
- Notable entrants: Marlboro McLaren
- Notable drivers: 7. (United States) Michael Andretti; 7. (Finland) Mika Häkkinen; 8. (Brazil) Ayrton Senna
- Debut: 1993 South African Grand Prix
- First win: 1993 Brazilian Grand Prix
- Last win: 1993 Australian Grand Prix
- Last event: 1993 Australian Grand Prix
| Races | Wins | Podiums | Poles | F/Laps |
|---|---|---|---|---|
| 16 | 5 | 9 | 1 | 1 |
- Constructors' Championships: 0
- Drivers' Championships: 0

The McLaren MP4/8 was the Formula One car with which the McLaren team competed in the 1993 Formula One World Championship. The car was designed by Neil Oatley around advanced electronics technology including a semi-automatic transmission (which could be switched over to fully automatic), active suspension, two-way telemetry, and traction control systems, that were developed in conjunction with McLaren shareholder Techniques d'Avant Garde (TAG). It was powered by the 3.5-litre Ford HBD7 V8 engine and was the first McLaren to feature barge boards. This was also the first Ford-powered McLaren car since the MP4/1C in 1983.

The car was driven by triple World Champion Ayrton Senna, in his sixth and final season with McLaren, and by Michael Andretti – son of 1978 World Champion Mario Andretti – who joined Formula One from CART. After the Italian Grand Prix, Andretti returned to America and was replaced by the team's test driver Mika Häkkinen. Senna drove the car to victory on five occasions, finishing runner-up to Alain Prost in the Drivers' Championship, while McLaren were runners-up to Williams in the Constructors' Championship. In an interview, team principal Ron Dennis described the MP4/8 as "one of the best cars we ever made".

== Engine ==
Honda had supplied McLaren with engines from 1988–92, the first four years where the team had dominated the drivers' and Constructors' Championships. However, Honda departed Formula One after 1992 due to the worldwide recession and team principal Ron Dennis was unable to get a supply of Renault engines as a replacement. With Honda pulling out of the sport, McLaren had to make do with customer Ford V8 engines which had inferior power compared to the V10 Renaults found in their chief rival Williams, and even the higher-spec HBA8 Ford V8s used by Benetton. Because Benetton had a pre-existing contract as the Ford factory team, McLaren initially had to settle for a customer engine which lacked some of the technological advancements of Benetton's factory engine; McLaren did secure a supply of the higher spec Ford engines after the British Grand Prix for the rest of the season except for Belgium where the older engine was used in Andretti's car to stockpile newer engines for the rest of the season. The customer-spec Ford engine was only rated at around 680 hp (507 kW; 689 PS) compared to the 700 hp (522 kW; 710 PS) of the works Ford engine in the Benetton, and both were well down on the 760–780 hp (567–582 kW; 771–791 PS) Renault used by Williams and the 745 hp (556 kW; 755 PS) V12 Ferraris.

== 1993 season ==
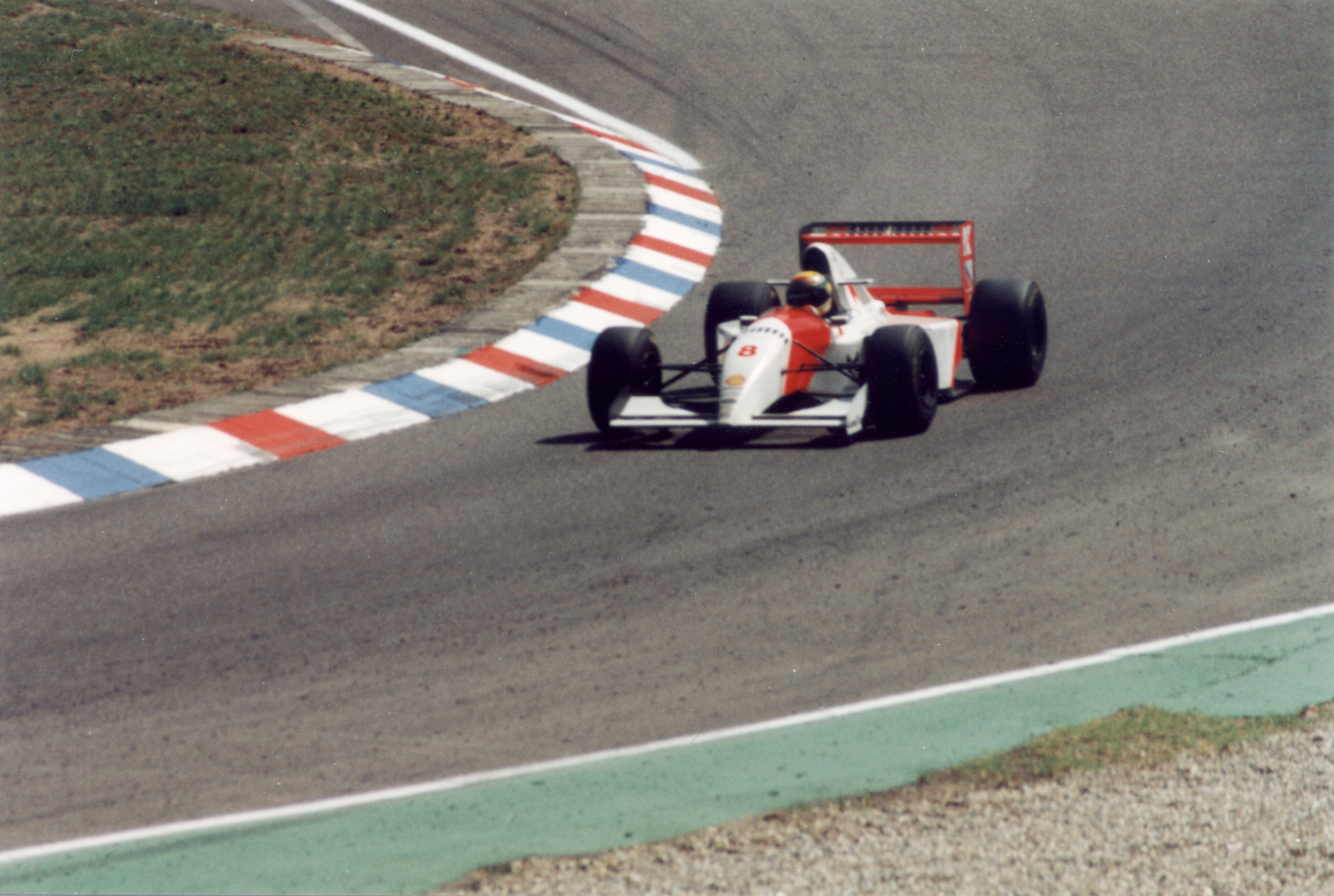
Ayrton Senna driving the MP4/8 at the 1993 German Grand Prix.

Initially, Ayrton Senna was impressed by the car's handling and nimbleness, but he knew the customer Ford-Cosworth V8 to be underpowered compared to the Renault V10-powered Williams and he demanded a race-by-race contract at $1 million per Grand Prix, although others suggested that this was a marketing ploy between Senna and Ron Dennis to keep sponsors on edge and interested. Although the Ford-Cosworth V8 was lighter than the Renault V10, the power-to weight ratio of the Renault was greater than the Ford.

The MP4/8 was competitive enough to achieve some remarkable successes. Even though rival Alain Prost was in the superior Williams FW15C, Senna's skill enabled him to lead the championship until after Canada, by winning 3 of the first 6 races, which consisted of his second victory in Brazil, his sixth Monaco Grand Prix victory, and one of his greatest drives in the rain-soaked 1993 European Grand Prix at Donington Park in England. Later in the season, the Frenchman asserted the dominance of his Williams to take the lead for good, while Senna fell off pace during the second half of the schedule and dropped to third place. Although Prost clinched the championship with two races to spare, Senna went on to win the last two races in Japan and Australia. The Brazilian had five wins in total, and finished second in the Drivers' Championship to Prost, whilst McLaren finished runners up to Williams in the Constructors' Championship.

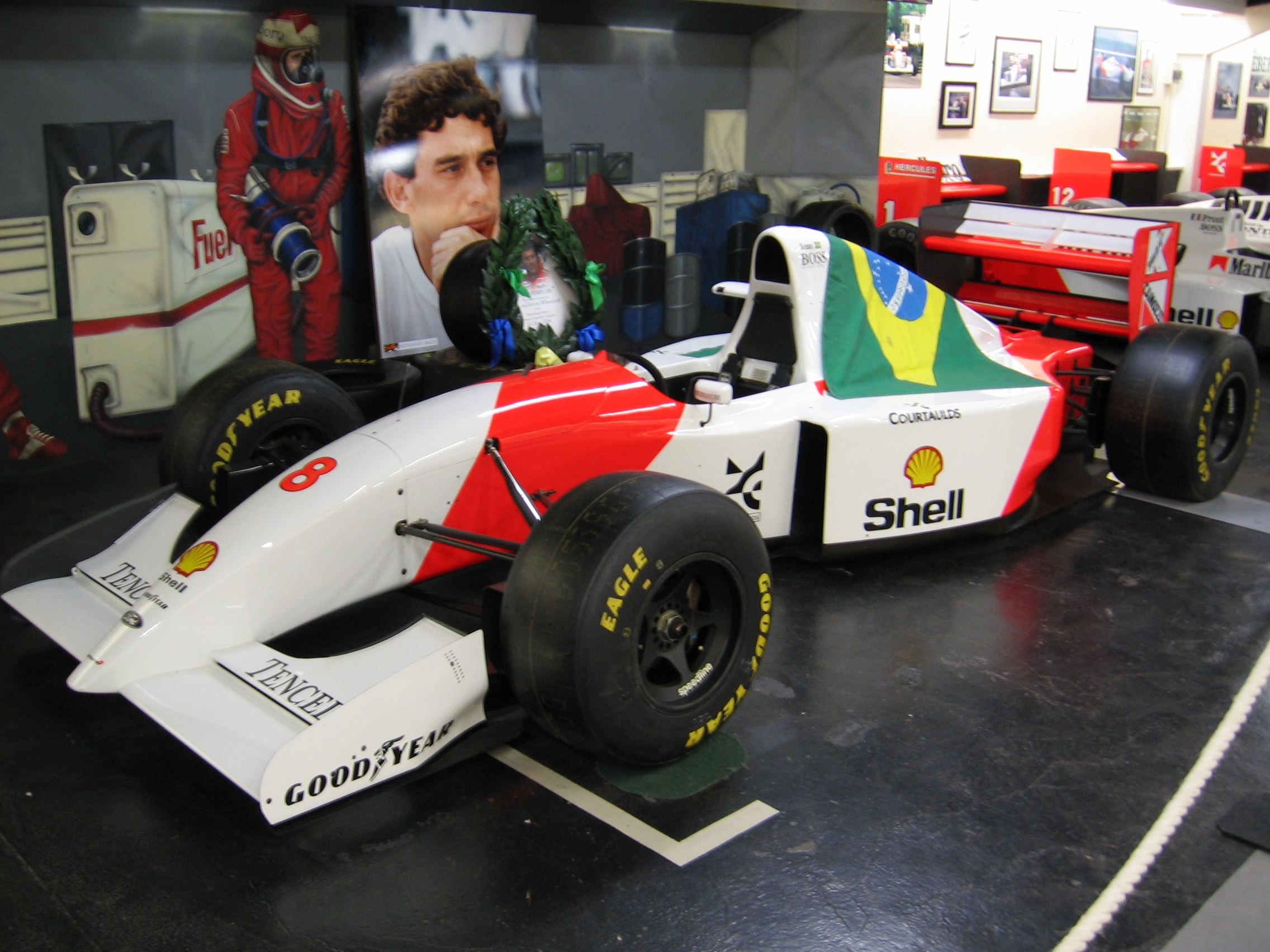
Ayrton Senna's MP4/8 on display at Donington, the site of his famous wet-weather victory in 1993.

The car scored 84 points during the season, 73 of which came from Senna, for an average of 2.63 per start. While Senna took the championship battle to the last few rounds, Michael Andretti had only a few points scoring finishes, including one third place in his final race in Monza at the 1993 Italian Grand Prix. Some factors were outside Andretti's control; with a restriction on the amount of testing teams were permitted in 1993, he never tested a Formula One car in the wet and a string of collisions meant that he only completed three laps in his first three races. Andretti also never came to grips with highly technical aspects such as active suspension and traction control, two "gizmos" not found in the simpler CART. Lastly, Andretti continued to reside in the United States, commuting to Formula One races and test sessions. This also caused him to miss several test days. By mutual agreement, Andretti was released from his contract after the Italian Grand Prix where he scored his only podium for the team. As of 2023, this remains the last podium finish achieved by an American driver in Formula One.

At the next round in Estoril for the 1993 Portuguese Grand Prix, Mika Häkkinen went on to out-qualify Senna (a rare occurrence for the Brazilian to be out-qualified by a teammate) and was in a competitive position in the race, dueling with Jean Alesi's Ferrari. Häkkinen ran too close to the Ferrari at the 5th gear final corner, losing downforce and understeering onto the grass, and into the wall. For the remainder of the season he went on to score one podium, and another retirement from a competitive position.

== MP4/8B ==
During 1993, the McLaren team built a modified version of the MP4/8, dubbed the MP4/8B, to be used as a test car for the Lamborghini V12 engine that had been in Formula One since 1989. After a handshake deal between Ron Dennis and Bob Lutz of Chrysler (who at the time owned Lamborghini) at a motor show in Munich, the modified car carried the 710 bhp (529 kW; 720 PS) V12 engine (dubbed the Lamborghini LE3512) that was also supplied at the time to the Larrousse team and had previously been used by both Lotus and Ligier with little success. Lutz explained that after four years in Formula One, Chrysler wanted to test whether the V12 had the potential to be a winner in Formula One. After running with lower ranked teams since its introduction to Formula One in 1989 (which by Lamborghini's own admission was because they did not feel the new engine could do justice to one of the leading teams), it was decided that a top team was needed to test that potential and a set of V12 engines were supplied to McLaren for testing. Senna and Häkkinen tested the car at both Silverstone and Estoril, with the first test taking place at Silverstone on 20 September.

The modified MP4/8B, painted white with no sponsorship logos other than Goodyear, took three months to re-engineer and stretch in order to fit the longer and heavier engine (the V12 was badged as Chrysler for the McLaren tests). After first driving the car Senna suggested to the engine's designer, former long-time Ferrari engineer Mauro Forghieri, that it would be better with a less brutal top end and a much fatter mid-range. Forghieri, who had enormous respect for the triple World Champion and valued his opinion, made the requested changes. While the engine lost 25 bhp (19 kW; 25 PS) at the top end, the test engines gained some 40 bhp (30 kW; 41 PS) over the 1993 Lamborghini race engine, giving the V12 approximately 750 bhp (559 kW; 760 PS), around 70 bhp (52 kW; 71 PS) more than the customer Ford V8 engines and almost on par with the most powerful engine of 1993, Renault's V10. This also gave the Lamborghini engine around 10 bhp (7 kW; 10 PS) more than the V12 used by Ferrari, the only other V12 in Formula One at the time. The resulting changes to the V12 reportedly made the MP4/8B more drivable and much faster than before, even faster than the race version.

According to Senna's 1993 race engineer and the chief engineer of the McLaren test team, Italian Giorgio Ascanelli: "It was three months of solid work, in the middle of a season; new launch control, revised chassis, gearbox, drive-by-wire…it was a lot of work. Only a great team like McLaren could have done it. But we came out with something pretty special. It was a bit longer and heavier than the V8 car, but more stable and easier on its tyres. And it was considerably more powerful."

According to reports at the time, the combination of the MP4/8B and the Lamborghini V12 actually proved more stable and easier on tyres than the Ford powered MP4/8 race cars. Both Senna and Häkkinen were reportedly very impressed with the car/engine combination, despite the 3512's poor reliability record since its Formula One debut and its poor reliability during the tests (the engine's best result to that point was a lucky 3rd place at the infamous 1990 Japanese Grand Prix, which would ultimately prove to be its best ever result). Häkkinen claimed that during the Silverstone test, one of the engines blew up as he was racing down the Hangar Straight. He claimed that right up to the point of detonation the engine was pushing out more and more power and actually felt much faster than the Ford. He also told that the blow up was very big with bits of the engine actually flying past his helmet.

Senna later fueled rumours that the car would be raced during the 1993 season when he reportedly said during testing: "It would be very interesting to race the Lamborghini in Japan." His belief was that regardless of reliability, the McLaren-Lamborghini would at least be as fast as both the Williams-Renaults and Benetton-Fords who he was struggling to keep up with in races using the customer spec Ford V8 (though Senna won in Japan using the Ford V8 and backed that up with his last ever win in Australia). Senna even allegedly rang Ron Dennis from the pits during the Estoril test (according to reports Dennis took the call in his private limo as he was in England at the time) and told him that he felt that they should seriously think about using the V12 instead of the V8. The potential for the car and engine was there for all to see. According to former McLaren and now Pratt & Miller engineer Ian Wright in 2015, "When the Lamborghini engine was bolted onto the MP4/8 it did not go any quicker, so some downforce was added to enable the extra power to be used. Had the MP4/8 had the Lamborghini engine on the back instead of the Ford it would have had the pace to win the '93 championship comfortably."

History shows that this never happened as plans were by then already in motion for McLaren to use the Peugeot A6 V10 in 1994. In late 1993, Senna had already signed for Williams for the 1994 season; 20 years later, Dennis revealed that Senna would have remained with McLaren had McLaren signed Peugeot earlier (as he believed a 'works' partnership to be essential to success in Formula One), but felt obligated to stay with Williams. At the time, it was speculated that Senna believed that despite Peugeot's recent success with its 3.5 litre V10 in endurance sports car racing, having won Le Mans in 1992 and 1993 as well as the 1992 World Sportscar Championship, the engine would not stand up to the rigors of Formula One where the engines were under high strain and were constantly being pushed to their limits, nor did he believe that the Peugeot engine had enough power to challenge the Renault V10; both beliefs were proven correct over the course of the 1994 season. The McLaren MP4/9 Peugeot which followed was closely based on its predecessor, but was not as successful as the engines proved woefully unreliable (eventually becoming infamous for failing spectacularly) and promised development from Peugeot never eventuated. After a dismal 1994 season, McLaren severed ties with Peugeot and began its successful partnership with Mercedes in 1995. Following Senna's win in Australia, McLaren would not score another victory until four years later at the 1997 Australian Grand Prix, which was won by David Coulthard in the MP4/12.

The MP4/8B made its public debut at the 2026 Goodwood Festival of Speed.

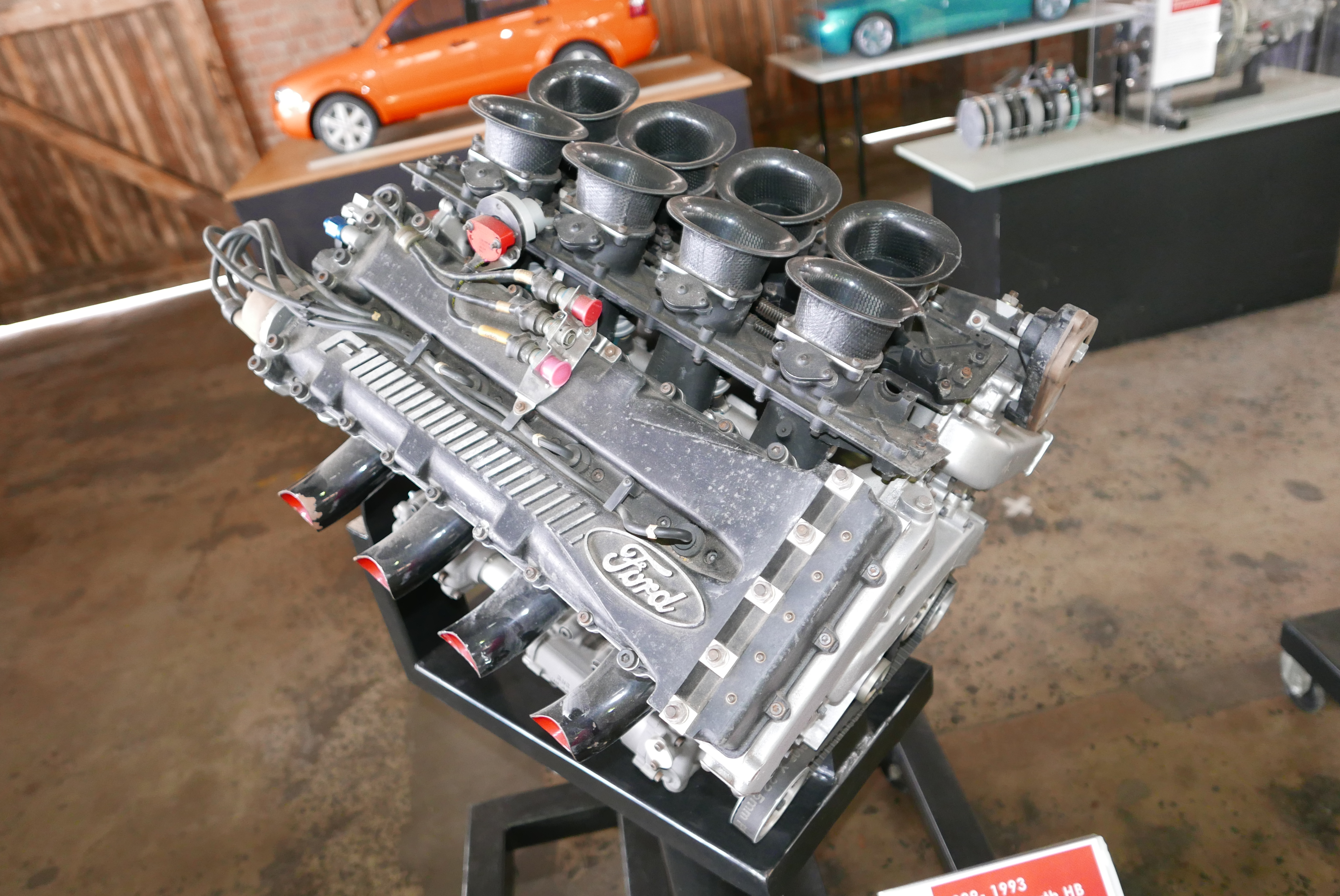
Ford Cosworth HB V8 engine

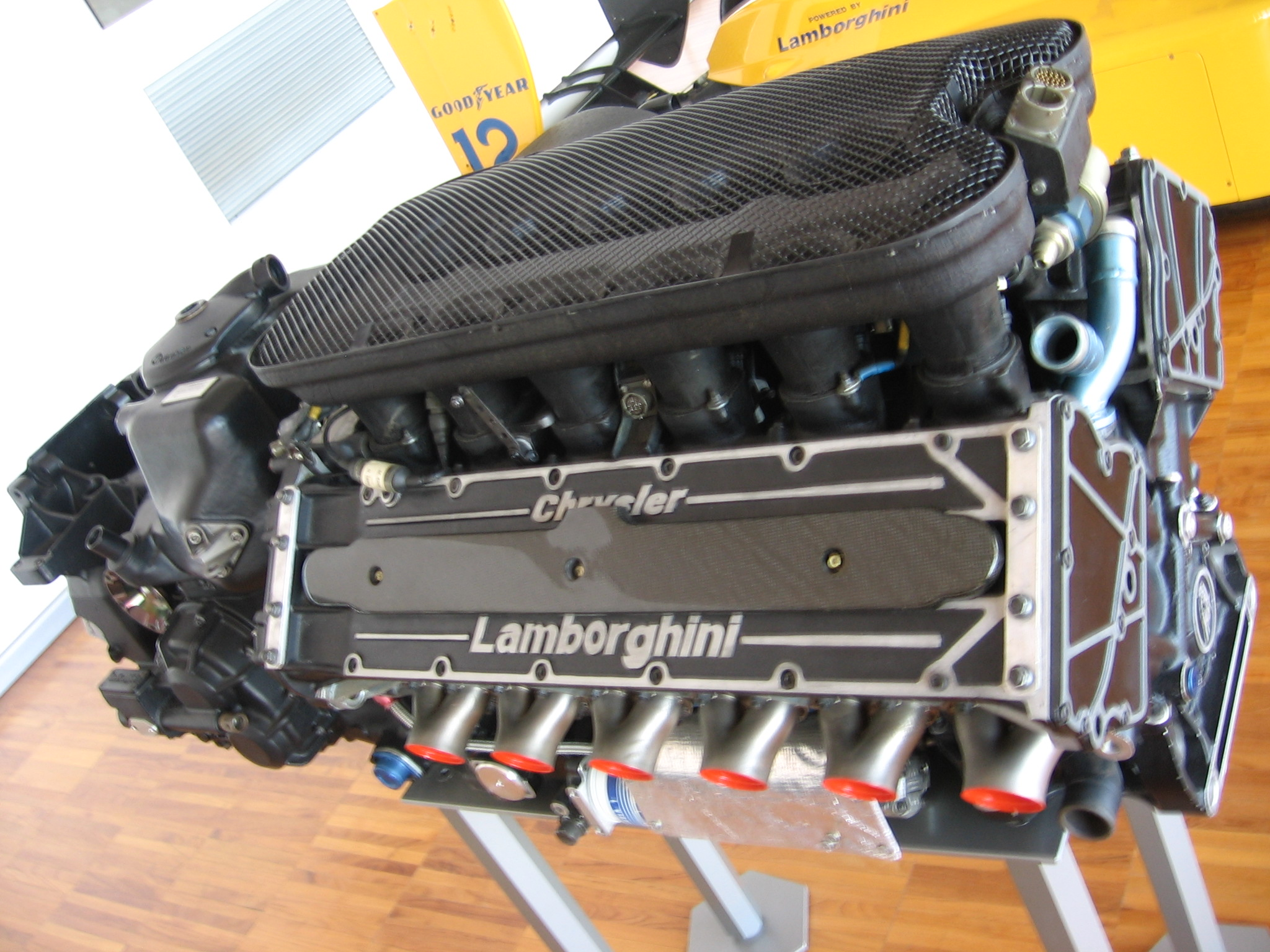
Lamborghini LE3512 V12 engine used in testing only

== Sponsorship and livery ==
McLaren used the 'Marlboro' logos, except at the French, British, German and European Grands Prix. The team received new sponsorships from Kmart and Camozzi, placed on the side of the rear wing.

There is a variant on the Ford logo where it was coloured in either black or white.

In response to the Sega-sponsored Williams, McLaren used a squashed hedgehog badge after Senna took his victory in Donington.

The cars carried numbers 7 and 8. McLaren had lost the Drivers' Championship title in 1992, forcing it to give up its 1/2 numbers, but rather than swap with new champion Williams' 5/6, it chose to pick up the 7/8 that had been left by the vacated Brabham team and which McLaren had carried from 1978-1984.

== Other events ==
Retired 4-time Formula One World Champion Sebastian Vettel drove Ayrton Senna's McLaren MP4/8 at the 2023 Goodwood Festival of Speed alongside Nigel Mansell's title-winning Williams FW14B.

Vettel also paid tribute to Ayrton Senna and Formula One driver Roland Ratzenberger who crashed 30 years ago at the 1994 San Marino Grand Prix by driving Senna's car for a demo run at the 2024 Emilia Romagna Grand Prix

== In video games ==
The McLaren MP4/8 was a playable vehicle in Asphalt 8: Airborne. It was added in January 2017's "Lunar New Year 2017 Update".

== Complete Formula One results ==
(key) (Results in bold indicate pole position; results in italics indicate fastest lap)

| Year | Team | Engine | Tyres | Drivers | 1 | 2 | 3 | 4 | 5 | 6 | 7 | 8 | 9 | 10 | 11 | 12 | 13 | 14 | 15 | 16 | Points | WCC |
|---|---|---|---|---|---|---|---|---|---|---|---|---|---|---|---|---|---|---|---|---|---|---|
| 1993 | Marlboro McLaren | Ford HBD7; V8 | **G** | | RSA | BRA | EUR | SMR | ESP | MON | CAN | FRA | GBR | GER | HUN | BEL | ITA | POR | JPN | AUS | **84** | **2nd** |
| 1993 | Marlboro McLaren | Ford HBD7; V8 | **G** | Michael Andretti | Ret | Ret | Ret | Ret | 5 | 8 | 14 | 6 | Ret | Ret | Ret | 8 | 3 | | | | **84** | **2nd** |
| 1993 | Marlboro McLaren | Ford HBD7; V8 | **G** | Mika Häkkinen | | | | | | | | | | | | | | Ret | 3 | Ret | **84** | **2nd** |
| 1993 | Marlboro McLaren | Ford HBD7; V8 | **G** | Ayrton Senna | 2 | 1 | 1 | Ret | 2 | 1 | 18 | 4 | 5 | 4 | Ret | 4 | Ret | Ret | 1 | **1** | **84** | **2nd** |
