= 1992 Australian Grand Prix =

Race 16 of 16 in the 1992 Formula One World Championship
← Previous race	Next race →

Race details
- Date: 8 November 1992
- Official name: LVII Australian Grand Prix
- Location: Adelaide Street Circuit; Adelaide, South Australia, Australia
- Course: Temporary street circuit
- Course length: 3.780 km (2.362 miles)
- Distance: 81 laps, 306.180 km (191.322 miles)
- Weather: Cloudy

Pole position
Driver	(United Kingdom) Nigel Mansell	Williams-Renault
- Time: 1:13.732

Fastest lap
Driver	(Germany) Michael Schumacher	Benetton-Ford
- Time: 1:16.078 on lap 68

Podium
First	(Austria) Gerhard Berger	McLaren-Honda
Second	(Germany) Michael Schumacher	Benetton-Ford
Third	(United Kingdom) Martin Brundle	Benetton-Ford

The 1992 Australian Grand Prix was a Formula One motor race held at Adelaide on 8 November 1992. It was the sixteenth and final race of the 1992 Formula One World Championship.

The 81-lap race was won by Austrian driver Gerhard Berger, driving a McLaren-Honda. Berger won by 0.7 seconds from German Michael Schumacher in a Benetton-Ford, with Schumacher's British teammate Martin Brundle third. Nigel Mansell, in what was intended to be his final Formula One race before his move to IndyCars for 1993, took pole position in his Williams-Renault and led until Brazilian Ayrton Senna, in the other McLaren-Honda, collided with him while attempting to overtake him, eliminating them both.

Brundle (who spent 1993 with Ligier), Berger (who returned to Ferrari) and Riccardo Patrese (who joined Benetton) were among the many drivers for whom this was the final race with their current teams, while for Jan Lammers, Stefano Modena, Maurício Gugelmin and Olivier Grouillard it was the last Grand Prix of their careers.

This was McLaren's final race using Honda engines until 2015. The company ceased their full factory involvement in the sport following this race, although the Mugen arm of the company continued. They returned in 2000 as engine supplier to BAR.

This Grand Prix would also be the last Grand Prix for the March F1 team.

== Qualifying ==
=== Qualifying report ===
Nigel Mansell took pole position in his Williams-Renault by nearly half a second from Ayrton Senna in the McLaren-Honda. It was Mansell's 14th pole position of the season, surpassing the 13 achieved by Senna in both 1988 and 1989. Their respective teammates, Riccardo Patrese and Gerhard Berger, were third and fourth, followed by Michael Schumacher in the Benetton and Jean Alesi in the Ferrari. Completing the top ten were Andrea de Cesaris in the Tyrrell, Martin Brundle in the second Benetton, Érik Comas in the Ligier and Mika Häkkinen in the Lotus.

=== Qualifying classification ===
Pos	No	Driver	Constructor	Q1	Q2	Gap
1	5	(United Kingdom) Nigel Mansell	Williams-Renault	1:13.732	1:15.133	
2	1	(Brazil) Ayrton Senna	McLaren-Honda	1:14.202	1:14.416	+0.470
3	6	(Italy) Riccardo Patrese	Williams-Renault	1:14.370	1:15.895	+0.638
4	2	(Austria) Gerhard Berger	McLaren-Honda	1:15.114	1:15.688	+1.382
5	19	(Germany) Michael Schumacher	Benetton-Ford	1:15.210	1:16.613	+1.478
6	27	(France) Jean Alesi	Ferrari	1:16.091	1:17.213	+2.359
7	4	(Italy) Andrea de Cesaris	Tyrrell-Ilmor	1:16.440	1:17.333	+2.708
8	20	(United Kingdom) Martin Brundle	Benetton-Ford	1:16.562	1:17.674	+2.830
9	26	(France) Érik Comas	Ligier-Renault	1:16.727	1:17.856	+2.995
10	11	(Finland) Mika Häkkinen	Lotus-Ford	1:16.863	1:17.868	+3.131
11	9	(Italy) Michele Alboreto	Footwork-Mugen-Honda	1:16.937	1:17.621	+3.205
12	12	(United Kingdom) Johnny Herbert	Lotus-Ford	1:16.944	1:18.099	+3.212
13	3	(France) Olivier Grouillard	Tyrrell-Ilmor	1:17.037	1:19.017	+3.305
14	22	(Italy) Pierluigi Martini	Dallara-Ferrari	1:17.047	1:18.043	+3.315
15	32	(Italy) Stefano Modena	Jordan-Yamaha	1:17.231	1:18.790	+3.499
16	24	(Italy) Gianni Morbidelli	Minardi-Lamborghini	1:17.333	1:19.661	+3.601
17	23	(Brazil) Christian Fittipaldi	Minardi-Lamborghini	1:17.367	1:19.441	+3.635
18	10	(Japan) Aguri Suzuki	Footwork-Mugen-Honda	1:17.409	1:19.589	+3.677
19	28	(Italy) Nicola Larini	Ferrari	1:17.465	1:18.618	+3.733
20	33	(Brazil) Maurício Gugelmin	Jordan-Yamaha	1:17.805	1:19.735	+4.073
21	29	(France) Bertrand Gachot	Venturi-Lamborghini	1:17.808	1:18.477	+4.076
22	25	(Belgium) Thierry Boutsen	Ligier-Renault	1:17.957	1:17.976	+4.225
23	17	(Italy) Emanuele Naspetti	March-Ilmor	4:23.313	1:18.099	+4.367
24	21	(Finland) JJ Lehto	Dallara-Ferrari	1:18.565	1:18.891	+4.833
25	16	(Netherlands) Jan Lammers	March-Ilmor	3:10.720	1:18.843	+5.111
26	30	(Japan) Ukyo Katayama	Venturi-Lamborghini	1:18.862	1:20.306	+5.130

== Race ==
=== Race report ===
Nicola Larini started this race from the back of the grid. A first-lap collision between the Tyrrell of Olivier Grouillard and the Dallara of Pierluigi Martini had eliminated both drivers on the same lap. The order of the top six at the end of the first lap was Mansell, Senna, Patrese, Berger, Schumacher and Alesi. Mansell as usual was unable to pull away, whilst Senna in second tried his hardest to pass the Williams on lap 8, but was unable to do so. Gugelmin for the second race running had spun out and crashed by lap 9.

Senna ran wide and allowed Mansell to retain the lead. The order of the top two remained the same until lap 19 when they collided at the Mistral hairpin; Senna attempted to overtake Mansell but crashed into the rear of the Williams (eliminating both drivers). This allowed Riccardo Patrese to take the lead from lap 20 in the remaining Williams, but was under enormous pressure from Gerhard Berger who was a close second. Berger, like Senna, attempted to pass the Williams on the outside but ran wide. Berger pitted for fresh tyres on lap 35, as did Michael Schumacher in the leading Benetton five laps later; the German rejoined four seconds behind Berger.

Martin Brundle was able to pass Jean Alesi in the leading Ferrari for third during their pit-stops. Patrese led by 20 seconds over Berger by the end of lap 50 until his engine failed on the next lap. Thus allowing Berger to take the lead and hold on to the lead for the remaining 31 laps and took the eighth victory of his career ahead of a hard-charging Schumacher by less than a second. The order of the top six was Berger winning ahead of, Michael Schumacher, Brundle, Alesi, Thierry Boutsen and Stefano Modena in the Jordan.

Jordan scored their only point of the season with Stefano Modena, while Thierry Boutsen (who won here in 1989) scored his only 1992 season points, and the last points of his career. Benetton's double podium finish ensured that they scored points in every round, as Benetton were the first team to score points in every round of a season since Lotus in 1963.

=== Race classification ===
Pos	No	Driver	Constructor	Laps	Time/Retired	Grid	Points
1	2	(Austria) Gerhard Berger	McLaren-Honda	81	1:46:54.786	4	10
2	19	(Germany) Michael Schumacher	Benetton-Ford	81	+ 0.741	5	6
3	20	(United Kingdom) Martin Brundle	Benetton-Ford	81	+ 54.156	8	4
4	27	(France) Jean Alesi	Ferrari	80	+ 1 lap	6	3
5	25	(Belgium) Thierry Boutsen	Ligier-Renault	80	+ 1 lap	22	2
6	32	(Italy) Stefano Modena	Jordan-Yamaha	80	+ 1 lap	15	1
7	11	(Finland) Mika Häkkinen	Lotus-Ford	80	+ 1 lap	10	
8	10	(Japan) Aguri Suzuki	Footwork-Mugen-Honda	79	+ 2 laps	18	
9	23	(Brazil) Christian Fittipaldi	Minardi-Lamborghini	79	+ 2 laps	17	
10	24	(Italy) Gianni Morbidelli	Minardi-Lamborghini	79	+ 2 laps	16	
11	28	(Italy) Nicola Larini	Ferrari	79	+ 2 laps	19	
12	16	(Netherlands) Jan Lammers	March-Ilmor	78	+ 3 laps	25	
13	12	(United Kingdom) Johnny Herbert	Lotus-Ford	77	+ 4 laps	12	
Ret	21	(Finland) JJ Lehto	Dallara-Ferrari	70	Gearbox	24	
Ret	17	(Italy) Emanuele Naspetti	March-Ilmor	55	Gearbox	23	
Ret	29	(France) Bertrand Gachot	Venturi-Lamborghini	51	Fuel system	21	
Ret	6	(Italy) Riccardo Patrese	Williams-Renault	50	Engine	3	
Ret	30	(Japan) Ukyo Katayama	Venturi-Lamborghini	35	Differential	26	
Ret	4	(Italy) Andrea de Cesaris	Tyrrell-Ilmor	29	Engine	7	
Ret	5	(United Kingdom) Nigel Mansell	Williams-Renault	18	Collision	1	
Ret	1	(Brazil) Ayrton Senna	McLaren-Honda	18	Collision	2	
Ret	33	(Brazil) Maurício Gugelmin	Jordan-Yamaha	7	Spun off	20	
Ret	26	(France) Érik Comas	Ligier-Renault	4	Engine	9	
Ret	9	(Italy) Michele Alboreto	Footwork-Mugen-Honda	0	Engine	11	
Ret	22	(Italy) Pierluigi Martini	Dallara-Ferrari	0	Accident	14	
Ret	3	(France) Olivier Grouillard	Tyrrell-Ilmor	0	Accident	13	

== Final championship standings ==
Drivers' Championship standings

	Pos	Driver	Points
	1	(United Kingdom) **Nigel Mansell**	108
	2	(Italy) Riccardo Patrese	56
1	3	(Germany) Michael Schumacher	53
1	4	(Brazil) Ayrton Senna	50
	5	(Austria) Gerhard Berger	49

Constructors' Championship standings

Pos	Constructor	Points
1	(United Kingdom) **Williams-Renault**	164
2	(United Kingdom) McLaren-Honda	99
3	(United Kingdom) Benetton-Ford	91
4	(Italy) Ferrari	21
5	(United Kingdom) Lotus-Ford	13

- Note: Only the top five positions are included for both sets of standings.
- **Bold text** indicates the 1992 World Champions.

Previous race: 1992 Japanese Grand Prix	FIA Formula One World Championship; 1992 season	Next race: 1993 South African Grand Prix
Previous race: 1991 Australian Grand Prix	Australian Grand Prix	Next race: 1993 Australian Grand Prix
