= Lambo 291 =

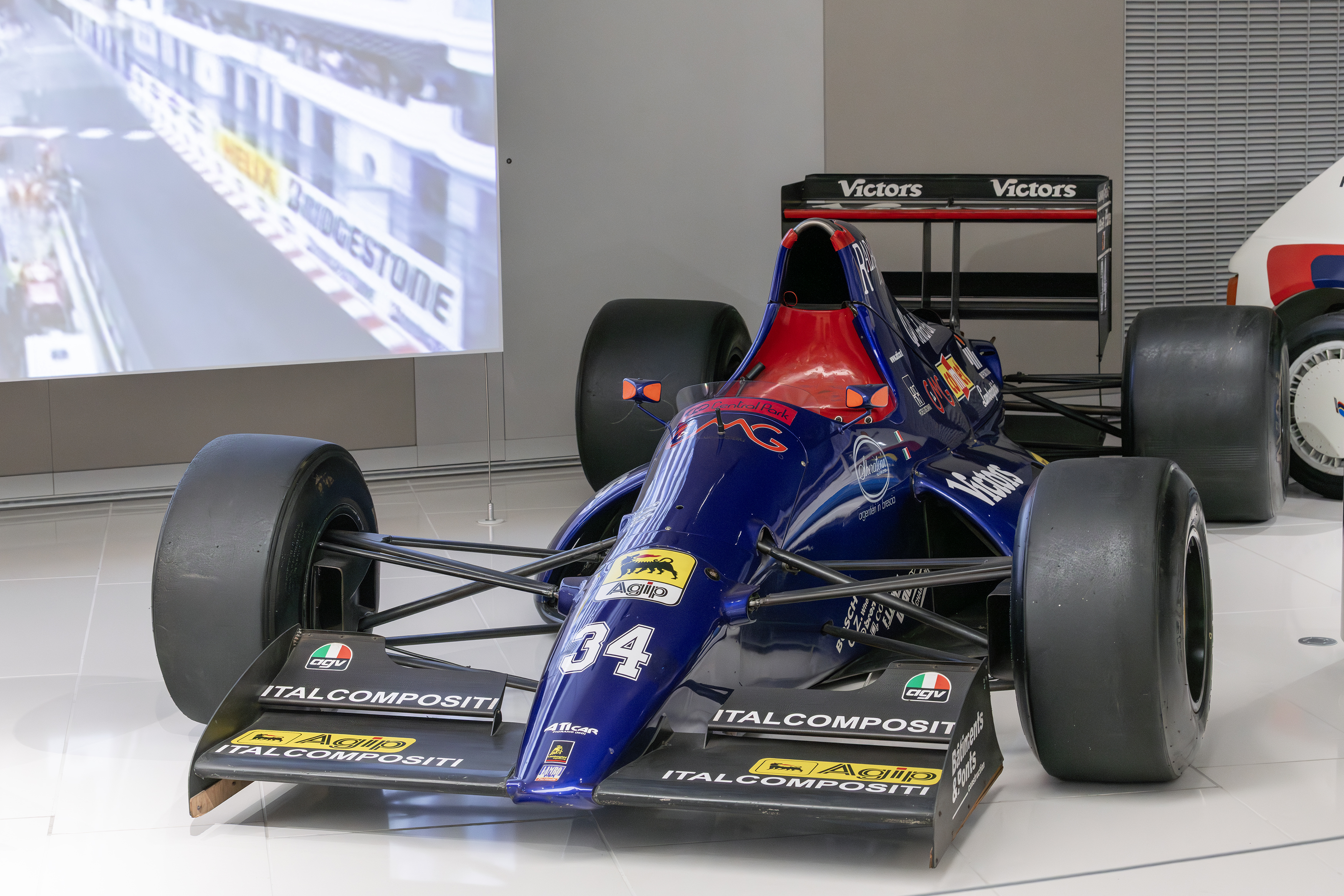
- Category: Formula One
- Constructor: Modena Team SpA
- Designers: Mauro Forghieri (Technical Director); Mario Tollentino (Chief Designer); Peter Wyss (Head of Design)

Technical specifications
- Chassis: carbon fibre monocoque
- Suspension (front): Double wishbone, pushrod
- Suspension (rear): Double wishbone, pushrod
- Length: 4,390 mm (172.8 in)
- Width: 1,900 mm (74.8 in)
- Height: 1,222 mm (48.1 in)
- Axle track: Front: 1,825 mm (71.9 in); Rear: 1,680 mm (66.1 in)
- Wheelbase: 2,915 mm (114.8 in)
- Engine: Lamborghini LE3512 3,493 cc (213.2 cu in) V12 (90°). Naturally-aspirated
- Transmission: 6 speed Sequential Manual
- Weight: 510 kg (1,124.4 lb)
- Fuel: Agip
- Lubricants: Agip
- Tyres: Goodyear

Competition history
- Notable entrants: Modena Team SpA
- Notable drivers: 34. (Italy) Nicola Larini; 35. (Belgium) Eric van de Poele
- Debut: 1991 United States Grand Prix
Races	Wins	Poles	F/Laps
16	0	0	0
- Constructors' Championships: 0
- Drivers' Championships: 0

The Lambo 291 was a Formula One car designed by Mauro Forghieri for use by the Modena team during the 1991 Formula One season. Its best finish was at the United States Grand Prix when Nicola Larini drove it to seventh place.

Forghieri managed to get a car ready by the end of 1990, after which it was tested at Imola by Mauro Baldi. It appeared in a distinctive dark blue livery, featuring triangular side pods and slanted radiators.

The car proved reasonable and surprisingly recorded its best result at the first race it entered. After Larini qualified it in 17th place, the car held together and finished in 7th place, albeit 5 laps behind winner Ayrton Senna in a McLaren MP4/6. The team came close to a points finish, notably at Imola where van de Poele was 5th in the final corner before fuel pressure problems dropped him back to 9th.

Apart from those two highlights, the team did not come close to points and usually failed to get through pre-qualifying until the 1991 British Grand Prix after which the team were promoted to the "prequalified" group (together with Jordan and Scuderia Italia/Dallara who had proven too fast for the Lambo 291 most of the time whilst AGS, Footwork and Brabham were forced to pre-qualify after the 1991 British Grand Prix). However, the failures to pre-qualify were now mostly replaced by failures to get through the "regular" qualifying sessions, and only Larini would give the car four more starts (Germany, Hungary, Australia, and in the home grand prix at Monza).

== Complete Formula One results ==
(key)

Year	Team	Engine	Tyres	Drivers	1	2	3	4	5	6	7	8	9	10	11	12	13	14	15	16	Points	WCC
1991	Modena Team SpA	Lamborghini L3512 V12	G		USA	BRA	SMR	MON	CAN	MEX	FRA	GBR	GER	HUN	BEL	ITA	POR	ESP	JPN	AUS	0	NC
1991	Modena Team SpA	Lamborghini L3512 V12	G	Nicola Larini	7	DNPQ	DNPQ	DNPQ	DNPQ	DNPQ	DNPQ	DNPQ	Ret	16	DNQ	16	DNQ	DNQ	DNQ	Ret	0	NC
1991	Modena Team SpA	Lamborghini L3512 V12	G	Eric van de Poele	DNPQ	DNPQ	9†	DNPQ	DNPQ	DNPQ	DNPQ	DNPQ	DNQ	DNQ	DNQ	DNQ	DNQ	DNQ	DNQ	DNQ	0	NC

†Driver did not finish the race, but was still classified as they completed at least 90% of the race distance.
