= Modena (racing team) =

Formula 1 racing team

Modena Team
- Full name: Modena Team SpA
- Base: Modena, Italy
- Noted staff: Carlo Patrucco (Team Principal); Mauro Forghieri (Technical Director); Mario Tolentino (Designer/race engineer); Dave Morgan (Race Engineer)
- Noted drivers: (Italy) Nicola Larini (Belgium) Eric van de Poele

Formula One World Championship career
- First entry: 1991 United States Grand Prix
- Races entered: 16 (6 starts)
- Constructors: Lamborghini
- Engines: Lamborghini
- Constructors' Championships: 0
- Drivers' Championships: 0
- Race victories: 0 (best result: 7th, 1991 United States Grand Prix)
- Pole positions: 0
- Fastest laps: 0
- Final entry: 1991 Australian Grand Prix

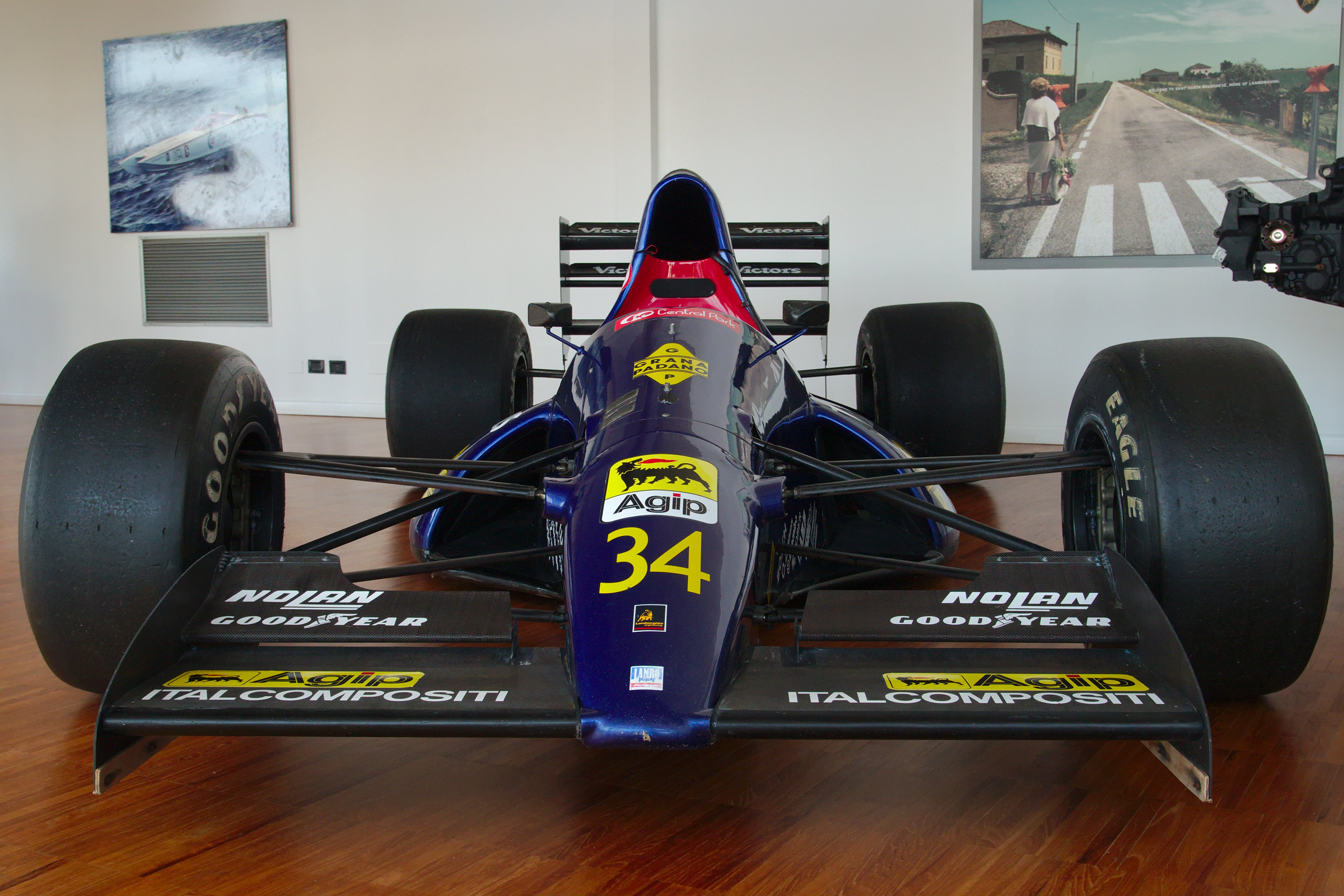
A Lambo 291

Modena Team SpA was a Formula One team from Italy that contested a single season in 1991. The team had a rather confused history, and is often referred to as the "Lambo" or Lamborghini team because of its connections to the Italian automotive manufacturer. It competed in 16 World Championship Grands Prix (6 starts) but scored no Championship points. Its best result was seventh in the 1991 United States Grand Prix.

== Formula One ==
The team first emerged as GLAS in early 1990. It was to be financed by wealthy Mexican businessman Fernando González Luna, who was reported to be investing around $20 million in the team, and it was to be run by former Italian journalist Leopoldo Canettoli. The young team had approached Italian sports car manufacturer Lamborghini, to not only supply them with their latest V12 Formula One engines, but to also design and build the chassis. Lamborghini had established a Formula One specific division in 1988, — Lamborghini Engineering – to oversee their burgeoning Formula One programme, and they entered the sport in 1989 as an engine supplier. In 1991, it would be the firm's first attempt at designing and building a Formula One car. Former Alfa Romeo and Spirit driver Mauro Baldi was proposed as a driver and part-backer for the team.

Lamborghini Engineering had tasked Mauro Forghieri, with the assistance of Mario Tolentino, to design and build a Formula One car. By the summer of 1990, they had completed the process and had a rolling chassis ready for testing, only for González Luna to disappear, taking all his money with him. This left a huge hole in the team's finances and effectively put its future in doubt. However, Lamborghini were determined to keep the project going as they already had the engines, and now they had a Formula One car. So, the Italian firm injected a sum of money into the team to keep it running. They relocated it to Modena in Italy, which resulted in a subsequent name change to match the team's new home. It then installed Italian industrialist and former Fila boss Carlo Patrucco as Team Principal, and entered the 1991 Formula One season with a new identity. Lamborghini were reluctant to have the team viewed as a "works" team though, as this might reflect badly on the marque, so it was entered as Modena Team SpA. Most media sources and fans ignored this, referring to the team as Lamborghini, or more colloquially as, "Lambo". However, it was noted that after an initial lump sum from Lamborghini, Modena Team were an entirely independent business entity and received no further investment or financial assistance from Lamborghini.

The change of name would cause confusion throughout the season. It was essentially a Lamborghini Engineering team, as they had designed and built the chassis, the chassis carried the firm's name and it was powered by a Lamborghini engine, but they were adamant on having it named differently and went about registering it under a different name, resulting in the team known as Modena but the cars as Lambo 291's on the official entry list. "Modena" was also the surname of Italian driver Stefano Modena (whose home town was actually Modena), a driver who would be contesting the 1991 season for Tyrrell.

The Lambo 291 had a blue colour scheme, triangular sidepods and slanting radiators. Slanting radiators would later become a key Formula One design trend some years later, continuing to this day. Mauro Baldi was the first driver to test-drive the new car, testing it in late 1990. The team then hired former Minardi man Jaime Manca Graziadei as Team Manager, who resigned before the first GP of the season. Former Italian Formula 3 champion, Coloni and Osella driver Nicola Larini, and 1990 International F3000 runner-up Eric van de Poele were signed as the team's drivers. Mario Tolentino would be Larini's race engineer while former Formula One driver Dave Morgan was hired as van de Poele's engineer.

Both cars faced pre-qualifying for the first half of the season and each driver only made it through into the race on one occasion – Larini coming 7th at the opening United States Grand Prix, and van de Poele running 5th at the San Marino Grand Prix, and on course for 2 world championship points, before a problem with the fuel system brought him to a halt on the last lap, within sight of the flag, resulting in van de Poele being classified as 9th.

By mid-season, the team were in financial difficulty, unable to secure any meaningful sponsorship and Lamborghini refusing to release any additional funds. Though the team was now clear of pre-qualifying when the process was reorganised, thanks to a count-back to Larini's 7th place at the 1991 United States Grand Prix, they were unable to make any progress. Larini got through to a further four races (spinning out of the German Grand Prix, coming 16th at the Hungarian Grand Prix and Italian Grand Prix and colliding with Jean Alesi at the Australian Grand Prix). Forghieri had also left his post as Technical Director mid-season to refocus on his role with Lamborghini Engineering and oversee the design of an all new engine for the 1992 Formula One season.

By the end of the season, Modena Team SpA were in debt, and Lamborghini was no longer providing financial aid. Forghieri returned to try to organise Modena as a viable independent entity from Lamborghini Engineering, or attempt a merger with the Larrousse Formula One team or Reynard's stillborn F1 project to save the team. However, neither proposal came to fruition. The questions about its future had not prevented the team from independently commissioning Sergio Rinland to design a car for the 1992 Formula One season, a project Rinland had already begun in October 1991. Rumours were that the team would either use Judd V8 engines or continue the relationship with Lamborghini as engine suppliers. Ultimately, the team shut down operations before the 1992 season, unable to overcome their financial problems.

Amid these uncertainties, Modena Team independently engaged Sergio Rinland to design a car for the 1992 Formula One Season. Rinland's work on the project began in October 1991. The team considered using Judd V8 engines or continuing its relationship with Lamborghini for engine supply. Despite these efforts, Modena Team ultimately faced insurmountable financial challenges and ceased operations before the 1992 season.

A chassis of this car can now be found at the Museo Lamborghini in Sant'Agata Bolognese.

== Complete Formula One results ==
(key)

Year	Chassis	Engine	Tyres	Drivers	No.	1	2	3	4	5	6	7	8	9	10	11	12	13	14	15	16	Points	WCC
1991	Lambo 291	Lamborghini L3512 V12	G			USA	BRA	SMR	MON	CAN	MEX	FRA	GBR	GER	HUN	BEL	ITA	POR	ESP	JPN	AUS	0	NC
1991	Lambo 291	Lamborghini L3512 V12	G	Nicola Larini	34	7	DNPQ	DNPQ	DNPQ	DNPQ	DNPQ	DNPQ	DNPQ	Ret	16	DNQ	16	DNQ	DNQ	DNQ	Ret	0	NC
1991	Lambo 291	Lamborghini L3512 V12	G	Eric van de Poele	35	DNPQ	DNPQ	9	DNPQ	DNPQ	DNPQ	DNPQ	DNPQ	DNQ	DNQ	DNQ	DNQ	DNQ	DNQ	DNQ	DNQ	0	NC
