= 1991 Brazilian Grand Prix =

- Race 2 of 16 in the 1991 Formula One World Championship

Race details
- Date: 24 March 1991
- Location: Autódromo José Carlos Pace; São Paulo, Brazil
- Course: Permanent racing facility
- Course length: 4.325 km (2.687 miles)
- Distance: 71 laps, 307.075 km (190.808 miles)
- Weather: Cloudy at start, rainy later. Ambient temperature: 29.4°C (85°F). Humidity: 95%. Wind speed: 33.7 km/h (21 mph).

Pole position
Driver	(Brazil) Ayrton Senna	McLaren-Honda
- Time: 1:16.392

Fastest lap
Driver	(United Kingdom) Nigel Mansell	Williams-Renault
- Time: 1:20.436 on lap 35

Podium
First	(Brazil) Ayrton Senna	McLaren-Honda
Second	(Italy) Riccardo Patrese	Williams-Renault
Third	(Austria) Gerhard Berger	McLaren-Honda

The 1991 Brazilian Grand Prix was a Formula One motor race held at Interlagos on 24 March 1991. It was the second race of the 1991 Formula One World Championship.

The 71-lap race was won from pole position by local driver Ayrton Senna, driving a McLaren-Honda. It was the first time Senna had won his home Grand Prix, in his eighth season of F1. Italian Riccardo Patrese finished second in a Williams-Renault, with Senna's Austrian teammate Gerhard Berger third.

== Qualifying ==
=== Pre-qualifying report ===
In the Friday morning pre-qualifying session, a Dallara was again the fastest car, but this time it was JJ Lehto who topped the time sheets. He was six tenths of a second ahead of the Jordan of Andrea de Cesaris, who was a fraction faster than his team-mate Bertrand Gachot in third. The fourth pre-qualifier was the other Scuderia Italia Dallara, driven by Emanuele Pirro.

The two Modena Lambos missed out in fifth and sixth, with Eric van de Poele over a second slower than Pirro, with Nicola Larini another second further back. Seventh was Pedro Chaves in the Coloni, followed by Olivier Grouillard in the Fondmetal. Grouillard had initially used an interim chassis, with an eye to the team's new car which was still being completed, and was running well until the suspension broke. He was forced to revert to an older chassis, and was unable to match the times of his opponents.

=== Pre-qualifying classification ===
Pos	No	Driver	Constructor	Time	Gap
1	22	(Finland) JJ Lehto	Dallara-Judd	1:19.540	
2	33	(Italy) Andrea de Cesaris	Jordan-Ford	1:20.150	+0.610
3	32	(Belgium) Bertrand Gachot	Jordan-Ford	1:20.184	+0.644
4	21	(Italy) Emanuele Pirro	Dallara-Judd	1:20.567	+1.027
5	35	(Belgium) Eric van de Poele	Lambo-Lamborghini	1:21.919	+2.379
6	34	(Italy) Nicola Larini	Lambo-Lamborghini	1:22.944	+3.404
7	31	(Portugal) Pedro Chaves	Coloni-Ford	1:23.231	+3.691
8	14	(France) Olivier Grouillard	Fondmetal-Ford	1:23.951	+4.411

=== Qualifying classification ===
Pos	No	Driver	Constructor	Q1	Q2	Gap
1	1	(Brazil) Ayrton Senna	McLaren-Honda	1:18.711	1:16.392	
2	6	(Italy) Riccardo Patrese	Williams-Renault	1:22.069	1:16.775	+0.383
3	5	(United Kingdom) Nigel Mansell	Williams-Renault	1:20.056	1:16.843	+0.451
4	2	(Austria) Gerhard Berger	McLaren-Honda	1:19.557	1:17.471	+1.079
5	28	(France) Jean Alesi	Ferrari	1:19.350	1:17.601	+1.209
6	27	(France) Alain Prost	Ferrari	1:20.079	1:17.739	+1.347
7	20	(Brazil) Nelson Piquet	Benetton-Ford	1:20.105	1:18.577	+2.185
8	15	(Brazil) Maurício Gugelmin	Leyton House-Ilmor	1:22.196	1:18.664	+2.272
9	4	(Italy) Stefano Modena	Tyrrell-Honda	1:21.709	1:18.847	+2.455
10	32	(Belgium) Bertrand Gachot	Jordan-Ford	1:21.493	1:18.882	+2.490
11	29	(France) Éric Bernard	Lola-Ford	1:22.127	1:19.291	+2.899
12	21	(Italy) Emanuele Pirro	Dallara-Judd	1:21.286	1:19.305	+2.913
13	33	(Italy) Andrea de Cesaris	Jordan-Ford	1:21.710	1:19.339	+2.947
14	19	(Brazil) Roberto Moreno	Benetton-Ford	1:21.266	1:19.360	+2.968
15	16	(Italy) Ivan Capelli	Leyton House-Ilmor	1:21.171	1:19.517	+3.125
16	3	(Japan) Satoru Nakajima	Tyrrell-Honda	1:21.825	1:19.546	+3.154
17	30	(Japan) Aguri Suzuki	Lola-Ford	1:22.281	1:19.832	+3.440
18	25	(Belgium) Thierry Boutsen	Ligier-Lamborghini	1:23.197	1:19.868	+3.476
19	22	(Finland) JJ Lehto	Dallara-Judd	1:22.243	1:19.954	+3.562
20	23	(Italy) Pierluigi Martini	Minardi-Ferrari	1:22.852	1:20.175	+3.783
21	24	(Italy) Gianni Morbidelli	Minardi-Ferrari	1:26.147	1:20.502	+4.110
22	11	(Finland) Mika Häkkinen	Lotus-Judd	1:25.587	1:20.611	+4.219
23	26	(France) Érik Comas	Ligier-Lamborghini	1:22.682	1:21.168	+4.776
24	17	(Italy) Gabriele Tarquini	AGS-Ford	1:23.618	1:21.219	+4.827
25	8	(United Kingdom) Mark Blundell	Brabham-Yamaha	1:23.547	1:21.230	+4.838
26	7	(United Kingdom) Martin Brundle	Brabham-Yamaha	1:23.271	1:21.280	+4.888
27	10	(Italy) Alex Caffi	Footwork-Porsche	1:25.555	1:22.190	+5.798
28	18	(Sweden) Stefan Johansson	AGS-Ford	1:24.698	1:22.432	+6.040
29	9	(Italy) Michele Alboreto	Footwork-Porsche	1:25.795	1:22.739	+6.347
30	12	(United Kingdom) Julian Bailey	Lotus-Judd	1:24.947	1:23.590	+7.198

== Race ==
=== Race report ===
Ayrton Senna made a perfect start to lead from Nigel Mansell, Riccardo Patrese, Jean Alesi, Gerhard Berger and Alain Prost, building up a lead of three seconds by lap eight. However Mansell was closing and by lap 20 the gap was down to 0.7s. On lap 17 Prost pitted for new tyres, keen to avoid being stuck behind Nelson Piquet's Benetton. Mansell pitted on lap 26, but the stop was terrible - lasting over 14 seconds. This returned him to the race in fifth place behind Patrese, Alesi and Berger.

After Senna and Patrese had made their stops, Mansell was seven seconds behind the lead McLaren. There seemed no doubt that Senna would be caught but the chance never arose as on lap 50 Mansell had to stop for a new set of tyres after a puncture caused by debris on the track. Unknown to observers, Senna's gearbox was failing, having lost fourth gear and by lap 60 the lead was halved and Mansell had set fastest lap. Yet it was Mansell's gearbox that gave way first, forcing the Williams into a spin and causing him to retire on lap 61. With just a couple of laps left, Senna had also lost fifth and third gears. Having to maintain sixth gear in slow and medium corners meant that several times he nearly stalled. Patrese was catching him rapidly, but with gearbox problems of his own he was unable to pass.

Senna won 2.9 seconds ahead of Patrese. When he crossed the finish line, he started to scream in celebration of achieving his dream of winning at home. The tremendous struggle of trying to keep the car under control caused him to have muscle cramps and fever. After stopping his car, Senna was almost unable to move on his own. He had to be lifted bodily from the car due to exhaustion and driven to the podium in the medical car. Despite a small fire on the grid and a sticking throttle, Berger claimed the final podium place from Prost, Piquet and Alesi. On the podium, after all that effort, Senna barely managed to lift the trophy.

=== Race classification ===
Pos	No	Driver	Constructor	Tyre	Laps	Time/Retired	Grid	Points
1	1	(Brazil) Ayrton Senna	McLaren-Honda	G	71	1:38:28.128	1	10
2	6	(Italy) Riccardo Patrese	Williams-Renault	G	71	+ 2.991	2	6
3	2	(Austria) Gerhard Berger	McLaren-Honda	G	71	+ 5.416	4	4
4	27	(France) Alain Prost	Ferrari	G	71	+ 18.369	6	3
5	20	(Brazil) Nelson Piquet	Benetton-Ford	P	71	+ 21.960	7	2
6	28	(France) Jean Alesi	Ferrari	G	71	+ 23.641	5	1
7	19	(Brazil) Roberto Moreno	Benetton-Ford	P	70	+ 1 lap	14	
8	24	(Italy) Gianni Morbidelli	Minardi-Ferrari	G	69	+ 2 laps	21	
9	11	(Finland) Mika Häkkinen	Lotus-Judd	G	68	+ 3 laps	22	
10	25	(Belgium) Thierry Boutsen	Ligier-Lamborghini	G	68	+ 3 laps	18	
11	21	(Italy) Emanuele Pirro	Dallara-Judd	P	68	+ 3 laps	12	
12	7	(United Kingdom) Martin Brundle	Brabham-Yamaha	P	67	+ 4 laps	26	
13	32	(Belgium) Bertrand Gachot	Jordan-Ford	G	63	Fuel system	10	
Ret	5	(United Kingdom) Nigel Mansell	Williams-Renault	G	59	Gearbox	3	
Ret	26	(France) Érik Comas	Ligier-Lamborghini	G	50	Engine	23	
Ret	23	(Italy) Pierluigi Martini	Minardi-Ferrari	G	47	Spun off	20	
Ret	8	(United Kingdom) Mark Blundell	Brabham-Yamaha	P	34	Engine	25	
Ret	29	(France) Éric Bernard	Lola-Ford	G	33	Radiator	11	
Ret	22	(Finland) JJ Lehto	Dallara-Judd	P	22	Electrical	19	
Ret	33	(Italy) Andrea de Cesaris	Jordan-Ford	G	20	Engine	13	
Ret	4	(Italy) Stefano Modena	Tyrrell-Honda	P	19	Gearbox	9	
Ret	16	(Italy) Ivan Capelli	Leyton House-Ilmor	G	16	Transmission	15	
Ret	3	(Japan) Satoru Nakajima	Tyrrell-Honda	P	12	Spun off	16	
Ret	15	(Brazil) Maurício Gugelmin	Leyton House-Ilmor	G	9	Physical	8	
Ret	17	(Italy) Gabriele Tarquini	AGS-Ford	G	0	Suspension	24	
DNS	30	(Japan) Aguri Suzuki	Lola-Ford	G	0	Fuel pump	17	
DNQ	10	(Italy) Alex Caffi	Footwork-Porsche	G				
DNQ	18	(Sweden) Stefan Johansson	AGS-Ford	G				
DNQ	9	(Italy) Michele Alboreto	Footwork-Porsche	G				
DNQ	12	(United Kingdom) Julian Bailey	Lotus-Judd	G				
DNPQ	35	(Belgium) Eric van de Poele	Lambo-Lamborghini	G				
DNPQ	34	(Italy) Nicola Larini	Lambo-Lamborghini	G				
DNPQ	31	(Portugal) Pedro Chaves	Coloni-Ford	G				
DNPQ	14	(France) Olivier Grouillard	Fondmetal-Ford	G				

== Championship standings after the race ==
Drivers' Championship standings

	Pos	Driver	Points
	1	(Brazil) Ayrton Senna	20
	2	(France) Alain Prost	9
11	3	(Italy) Riccardo Patrese	6
1	4	(Brazil) Nelson Piquet	6
14	5	(Austria) Gerhard Berger	4

Constructors' Championship standings

	Pos	Constructor	Points
	1	(United Kingdom) McLaren-Honda	24
	2	(Italy) Ferrari	10
10	3	(United Kingdom) Williams-Renault	6
1	4	(United Kingdom) Benetton-Ford	6
1	5	(United Kingdom) Tyrrell-Honda	5

- Note: Only the top five positions are included for both sets of standings.

Previous race: 1991 United States Grand Prix	FIA Formula One World Championship; 1991 season	Next race: 1991 San Marino Grand Prix
Previous race: 1990 Brazilian Grand Prix	Brazilian Grand Prix	Next race: 1992 Brazilian Grand Prix
