= 1991 German Grand Prix =

- Race 9 of 16 in the 1991 Formula One World Championship

Race details
- Date: 28 July 1991
- Official name: Grosser Mobil 1 Preis von Deutschland
- Location: Hockenheimring, Hockenheim, Baden-Württemberg, Germany
- Course: Permanent racing facility
- Course length: 6.802 km (4.227 miles)
- Distance: 45 laps, 306.090 km (190.195 miles)
- Weather: Hot and sunny

Pole position
Driver	(United Kingdom) Nigel Mansell	Williams-Renault
- Time: 1:37.087

Fastest lap
Driver	(Italy) Riccardo Patrese	Williams-Renault
- Time: 1:43.569 on lap 35

Podium
First	(United Kingdom) Nigel Mansell	Williams-Renault
Second	(Italy) Riccardo Patrese	Williams-Renault
Third	(France) Jean Alesi	Ferrari

The 1991 German Grand Prix was a Formula One motor race held at the Hockenheimring on 28 July 1991. It was the ninth race of the 1991 Formula One World Championship, and the first German Grand Prix to be held in Germany after the reunification between West and East Germany.

The 45-lap race was won from pole position by British driver Nigel Mansell, driving a Williams-Renault. It was Mansell's third consecutive Grand Prix victory. His Italian teammate Riccardo Patrese finished second, with Frenchman Jean Alesi third in a Ferrari.

Drivers' Championship leader, Brazilian Ayrton Senna, failed to score in his McLaren-Honda after running out of fuel for the second consecutive race, allowing Mansell to close to within eight points of him.

== Pre-race ==
Ayrton Senna spent a night in a hospital in Mannheim after crashing during pre-race testing a week earlier. Senna suffered a tyre failure at the end of a long straight, causing the car to launch into the air and turn over several times. The McLaren-Honda went 15 feet into the air and was destroyed in the crash, according to witnesses. After regaining consciousness, Senna was taken to hospital with neck and chest bruising.

There were two changes to the entry list, the first was at Lotus where Johnny Herbert was replaced by young German Michael Bartels because of the former's Japanese Formula 3000 commitments, and the second was at Footwork where Alex Caffi was back in action after his road accident. Elsewhere Satoru Nakajima announced he would retire at the end of the year.

== Qualifying ==
=== Pre-qualifying report ===
The participants in the Friday morning pre-qualifying sessions were reshuffled prior to this event, the season having reached its mid-point. Scuderia Italia (Dallara) and Jordan had scored points, and were thus relieved of the requirement to pre-qualify, and could automatically join the rest of the field in the main qualifying sessions from here on. By virtue of Nicola Larini's seventh place finish at the first round in Phoenix, the Modena team were also lifted out of pre-qualifying, despite struggling in the sessions at recent Grands Prix.

Taking their places during the Friday morning sessions were Brabham, AGS, and Footwork, who had all failed to score points so far in 1991, or match Modena Lambo's seventh place finish at any race. Fondmetal and Coloni were also still required to pre-qualify.

Here at Hockenheim, the fastest pre-qualifier was Martin Brundle in the Brabham BT60Y. He was over a second faster than the AGS JH25B of Gabriele Tarquini, with Michele Alboreto just a tenth behind in the Footwork FA12C, despite gearbox problems. The fourth pre-qualifier was the other Brabham of Mark Blundell.

The four entrants missing out included Fondmetal driver Olivier Grouillard, who suffered an engine failure and finished fifth fastest, ahead of the second Footwork of Alex Caffi, who had returned to the cockpit after missing four races. The second AGS of Italian Fabrizio Barbazza was seventh, nearly a second ahead of regular backmarker Pedro Chaves for the cash-strapped Coloni team.

=== Pre-qualifying classification ===
Pos	No	Driver	Constructor	Time	Gap
1	7	(United Kingdom) Martin Brundle	Brabham-Yamaha	1:42.810	
2	17	(Italy) Gabriele Tarquini	AGS-Ford	1:43.939	+1.129
3	9	(Italy) Michele Alboreto	Footwork-Ford	1:44.034	+1.224
4	8	(United Kingdom) Mark Blundell	Brabham-Yamaha	1:44.257	+1.447
5	14	(France) Olivier Grouillard	Fondmetal-Ford	1:44.645	+1.835
6	10	(Italy) Alex Caffi	Footwork-Ford	1:45.282	+2.472
7	18	(Italy) Fabrizio Barbazza	AGS-Ford	1:46.604	+3.794
8	31	(Portugal) Pedro Chaves	Coloni-Ford	1:47.546	+4.736

=== Qualifying report ===
In Saturday practice Érik Comas had a massive accident at the Ostkurve chicane in his Ligier. The French driver was unhurt, but it raised questions about the safety of the second chicane. In qualifying, Nigel Mansell took pole from title rival Ayrton Senna. Gerhard Berger was third, followed by Riccardo Patrese- the Williams and McLaren cars were within 4 tenths of each other but were all nearly 2 seconds faster of the next fastest cars, the 2 Ferraris of Alain Prost and Jean Alesi, which were a second quicker than the next fastest car behind them. Then following the Ferraris were Andrea de Cesaris, Nelson Piquet, Roberto Moreno, and Pierluigi Martini in the Minardi, taking full advantage of his Ferrari engine around the high speed circuit.

=== Qualifying classification ===
Pos	No	Driver	Constructor	Q1	Q2	Gap
1	5	(United Kingdom) Nigel Mansell	Williams-Renault	1:37.467	1:37.087	
2	1	(Brazil) Ayrton Senna	McLaren-Honda	1:38.208	1:37.274	+0.187
3	2	(Austria) Gerhard Berger	McLaren-Honda	1:37.946	1:37.393	+0.306
4	6	(Italy) Riccardo Patrese	Williams-Renault	1:38.146	1:37.435	+0.348
5	27	(France) Alain Prost	Ferrari	1:39.422	1:39.034	+1.947
6	28	(France) Jean Alesi	Ferrari	1:39.391	1:39.042	+1.955
7	33	(Italy) Andrea de Cesaris	Jordan-Ford	1:40.387	1:40.239	+3.152
8	20	(Brazil) Nelson Piquet	Benetton-Ford	1:40.560	1:40.878	+3.473
9	19	(Brazil) Roberto Moreno	Benetton-Ford	1:41.968	1:40.957	+3.870
10	23	(Italy) Pierluigi Martini	Minardi-Ferrari	1:40.998	1:41.373	+3.911
11	32	(Belgium) Bertrand Gachot	Jordan-Ford	1:41.443	1:41.308	+4.221
12	16	(Italy) Ivan Capelli	Leyton House-Ilmor	1:42.025	1:41.330	+4.243
13	3	(Japan) Satoru Nakajima	Tyrrell-Honda	1:41.515	1:41.390	+4.303
14	4	(Italy) Stefano Modena	Tyrrell-Honda	1:41.566	1:41.952	+4.479
15	7	(United Kingdom) Martin Brundle	Brabham-Yamaha	1:42.294	1:41.615	+4.528
16	15	(Brazil) Maurício Gugelmin	Leyton House-Ilmor	no time	1:41.735	+4.648
17	25	(Belgium) Thierry Boutsen	Ligier-Lamborghini	1:41.823	1:41.929	+4.736
18	21	(Italy) Emanuele Pirro	Dallara-Judd	1:42.021	1:42.672	+4.934
19	24	(Italy) Gianni Morbidelli	Minardi-Ferrari	1:42.132	1:42.058	+4.971
20	22	(Finland) JJ Lehto	Dallara-Judd	1:42.171	1:42.708	+5.084
21	8	(United Kingdom) Mark Blundell	Brabham-Yamaha	1:43.414	1:42.216	+5.129
22	30	(Japan) Aguri Suzuki	Lola-Ford	1:45.037	1:42.474	+5.387
23	11	(Finland) Mika Häkkinen	Lotus-Judd	1:44.816	1:42.726	+5.639
24	34	(Italy) Nicola Larini	Lambo-Lamborghini	1:44.596	1:43.035	+5.948
25	29	(France) Éric Bernard	Lola-Ford	1:43.797	1:43.321	+6.234
26	26	(France) Érik Comas	Ligier-Lamborghini	1:43.803	1:43.364	+6.277
27	9	(Italy) Michele Alboreto	Footwork-Ford	1:44.362	1:43.409	+6.322
28	12	(Germany) Michael Bartels	Lotus-Judd	1:46.409	1:43.624	+6.537
29	17	(Italy) Gabriele Tarquini	AGS-Ford	1:43.787	1:43.918	+6.700
30	35	(Belgium) Eric van de Poele	Lambo-Lamborghini	1:44.489	1:44.207	+7.120

== Race ==
=== Race report ===
On Sunday, a couple of hours before the race, there was a FIA driver's meeting and Senna requested to race director Roland Bruynseraede that the tyre walls at the chicanes be replaced with traffic cones because of the possibility of hitting the tyres and rolling; that happened to him during qualifying for the Mexican Grand Prix, and this heated up when FIA president Jean-Marie Balestre, Senna and a few other drivers had a brief argument over the regulations involving safety. Balestre then instigated a democratic vote, and the vote went towards removing the tyre walls and replacing them with traffic cones.

At the start of the race, Mansell made a great start while Berger slotted into second ahead of team-mate Senna, with Prost, Patrese, and Alesi rounding out the top six. At the back Mark Blundell spun but continued, although Larini spun off into retirement in his attempt to avoid the Brabham. Berger made a bad pit-stop and fell back to tenth, while Prost started to reel in Senna. Mansell was running away at the front and when he pitted for tyres he dropped just behind Alesi, but did not waste time in changing the situation and passed Alesi two laps later to re-take the lead. While Mansell was surging away, a tremendous battle developed for third place between Senna, Prost, and Patrese, with Riccardo beating both men before setting off after Alesi. Senna and Prost continued to squabble over fourth and the major talking point came on lap 37 when Prost attempted to pass Senna going into the first chicane. Prost was faster and tried to go around the outside, Senna would not give way and Prost went off and proceeded to stall the engine. Prost blamed Senna and said he would not be so forgiving the next time while Senna accused Prost of complaining for the sake of complaining. Prost's comments would earn him a one-race suspended ban, while the FIA ordered a sit-down meeting between the two men at the next race. Meanwhile, Mansell cruised to his third straight win, leading home Patrese, Alesi, Berger, de Cesaris, and Gachot. Senna was running in fourth place, but ran out of fuel on the last lap for the second straight race and was classified seventh, allowing Mansell to close to within eight points of Senna in the drivers championship.

=== Race classification ===
Pos	No	Driver	Constructor	Laps	Time/Retired	Grid	Points
1	5	(United Kingdom) Nigel Mansell	Williams-Renault	45	1:19:29.661	1	10
2	6	(Italy) Riccardo Patrese	Williams-Renault	45	+ 13.779	4	6
3	28	(France) Jean Alesi	Ferrari	45	+ 17.618	6	4
4	2	(Austria) Gerhard Berger	McLaren-Honda	45	+ 32.651	3	3
5	33	(Italy) Andrea de Cesaris	Jordan-Ford	45	+ 1:17.537	7	2
6	32	(Belgium) Bertrand Gachot	Jordan-Ford	45	+ 1:40.605	11	1
7	1	(Brazil) Ayrton Senna	McLaren-Honda	44	Out of fuel	2	
8	19	(Brazil) Roberto Moreno	Benetton-Ford	44	+ 1 lap	9	
9	25	(Belgium) Thierry Boutsen	Ligier-Lamborghini	44	+ 1 lap	17	
10	21	(Italy) Emanuele Pirro	Dallara-Judd	44	+ 1 lap	18	
11	7	(United Kingdom) Martin Brundle	Brabham-Yamaha	43	+ 2 laps	15	
12	8	(United Kingdom) Mark Blundell	Brabham-Yamaha	43	+ 2 laps	21	
13	4	(Italy) Stefano Modena	Tyrrell-Honda	41	+ 4 laps	14	
Ret	27	(France) Alain Prost	Ferrari	37	Spun off	5	
Ret	16	(Italy) Ivan Capelli	Leyton House-Ilmor	36	Engine	12	
Ret	22	(Finland) JJ Lehto	Dallara-Judd	35	Engine	20	
Ret	20	(Brazil) Nelson Piquet	Benetton-Ford	27	Engine	8	
Ret	3	(Japan) Satoru Nakajima	Tyrrell-Honda	26	Gearbox	13	
Ret	26	(France) Érik Comas	Ligier-Lamborghini	22	Engine	26	
Ret	15	(Brazil) Maurício Gugelmin	Leyton House-Ilmor	21	Gearbox	16	
Ret	11	(Finland) Mika Häkkinen	Lotus-Judd	19	Engine	23	
Ret	30	(Japan) Aguri Suzuki	Lola-Ford	15	Engine	22	
Ret	24	(Italy) Gianni Morbidelli	Minardi-Ferrari	14	Differential	19	
Ret	23	(Italy) Pierluigi Martini	Minardi-Ferrari	11	Differential	10	
Ret	29	(France) Éric Bernard	Lola-Ford	9	Transmission	25	
Ret	34	(Italy) Nicola Larini	Lambo-Lamborghini	0	Spun off	24	
DNQ	9	(Italy) Michele Alboreto	Footwork-Ford				
DNQ	12	(Germany) Michael Bartels	Lotus-Judd				
DNQ	17	(Italy) Gabriele Tarquini	AGS-Ford				
DNQ	35	(Belgium) Eric van de Poele	Lambo-Lamborghini				
DNPQ	14	(France) Olivier Grouillard	Fondmetal-Ford				
DNPQ	10	(Italy) Alex Caffi	Footwork-Ford				
DNPQ	18	(Italy) Fabrizio Barbazza	AGS-Ford				
DNPQ	31	(Portugal) Pedro Chaves	Coloni-Ford				

== Championship standings after the race ==
Drivers' Championship standings

	Pos	Driver	Points
	1	(Brazil) Ayrton Senna	51
	2	(United Kingdom) Nigel Mansell	43
	3	(Italy) Riccardo Patrese	28
	4	(France) Alain Prost	21
1	5	(Austria) Gerhard Berger	19

Constructors' Championship standings

	Pos	Constructor	Points
1	1	(United Kingdom) Williams-Renault	71
1	2	(United Kingdom) McLaren-Honda	70
	3	(Italy) Ferrari	33
	4	(United Kingdom) Benetton-Ford	23
1	5	(Republic of Ireland) Jordan-Ford	13

- Note: Only the top five positions are included for both sets of standings.

Previous race: 1991 British Grand Prix	FIA Formula One World Championship; 1991 season	Next race: 1991 Hungarian Grand Prix
Previous race: 1990 German Grand Prix	German Grand Prix	Next race: 1992 German Grand Prix
