= 1991 San Marino Grand Prix =

- Race 3 of 16 in the 1991 Formula One World Championship
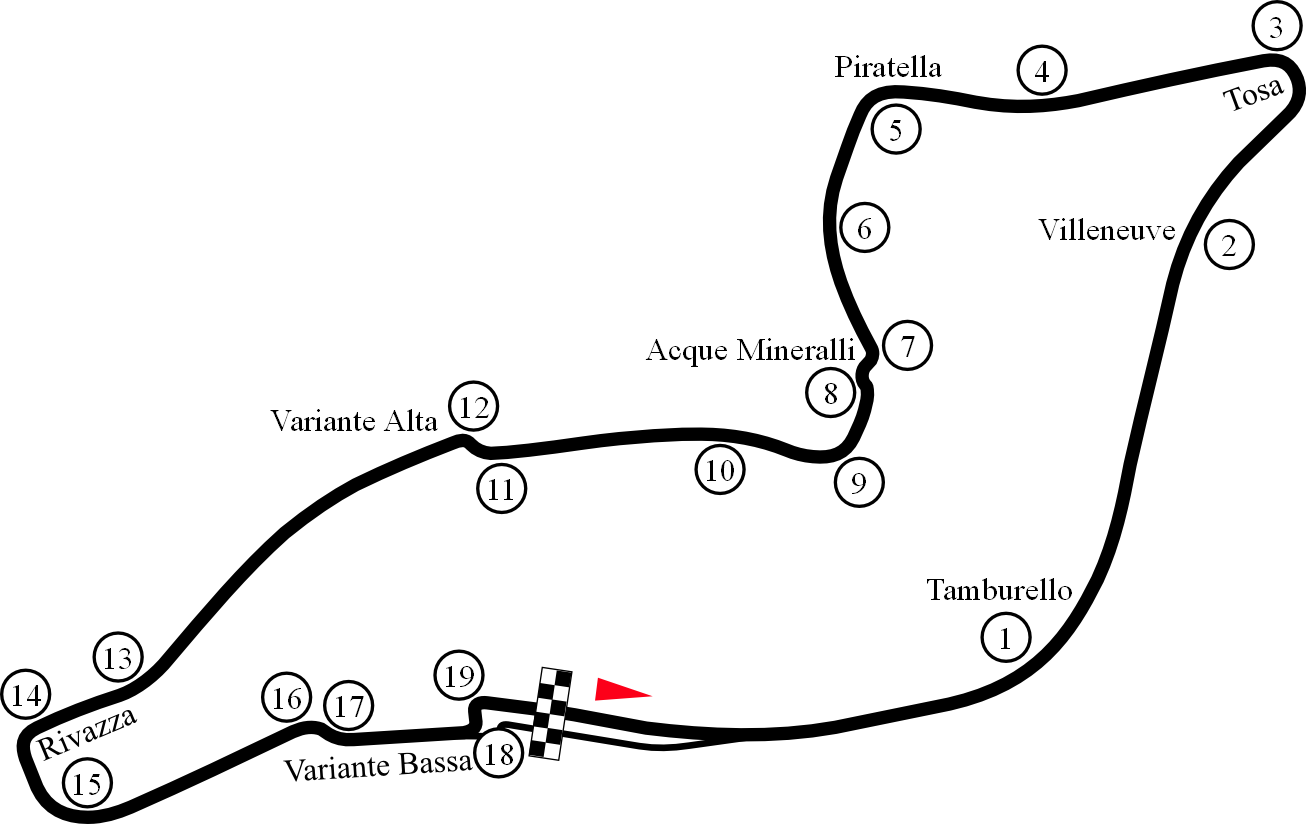
- The Imola circuit in its 1991 configuration

Race details
- Date: 28 April 1991
- Official name: XI Gran Premio di San Marino
- Location: Autodromo Enzo e Dino Ferrari, Imola, Emilia-Romagna, Italy
- Course: Permanent racing facility
- Course length: 5.040 km (3.132 miles)
- Distance: 61 laps, 307.440 km (191.034 miles)
- Weather: Wet at start, dry by finish

Pole position
Driver	(Brazil) Ayrton Senna	McLaren-Honda
- Time: 1:21.877

Fastest lap
Driver	(Austria) Gerhard Berger	McLaren-Honda
- Time: 1:26.531 on lap 55

Podium
First	(Brazil) Ayrton Senna	McLaren-Honda
Second	(Austria) Gerhard Berger	McLaren-Honda
Third	(Finland) JJ Lehto	Dallara-Judd

The 1991 San Marino Grand Prix was a Formula One motor race held at Imola on 28 April 1991. It was the third race of the 1991 Formula One World Championship.

The 61-lap race was won by Brazilian Ayrton Senna, driving a McLaren-Honda, after he started from pole position. His Austrian teammate Gerhard Berger finished second, with Finn JJ Lehto third in a Dallara-Judd. It was also McLaren's first 1-2 finish since the 1989 Belgian Grand Prix. This was Senna's final win at the San Marino Grand Prix before his death in 1994.

== Pre-race ==
With the team under new management having been sold by Cyril De Rouvre, Stefan Johansson was replaced at AGS by Formula One debutant Fabrizio Barbazza.

== Qualifying ==
=== Pre-qualifying report ===
In the pre-qualifying session on Friday morning, Andrea de Cesaris was fastest in the Jordan, just under four tenths of a second faster than JJ Lehto's Dallara in second. De Cesaris' team-mate Bertrand Gachot was third, just a few hundredths behind Lehto. The fourth pre-qualifier was Eric van de Poele in the Lambo, who edged out the second Dallara of Emanuele Pirro. It was van de Poele's first progression through to the main qualifying sessions, and the first time in 1991 that a Dallara had failed to pre-qualify.

Apart from Pirro, those who failed to pre-qualify included Olivier Grouillard in the new British-built Fomet-1 chassis debuted by the Fondmetal team. Despite teething troubles which prevented him from progressing any further, Grouillard said he was happy with the new car. Seventh was the other Lambo of Nicola Larini, and bottom of the time sheets was Pedro Chaves in the sole Coloni, who suffered a gearbox failure during the session.

=== Pre-qualifying classification ===
Pos	No	Driver	Constructor	Time	Gap
1	33	(Italy) Andrea de Cesaris	Jordan-Ford	1:25.535	—
2	22	(Finland) JJ Lehto	Dallara-Judd	1:25.923	+0.388
3	32	(Belgium) Bertrand Gachot	Jordan-Ford	1:25.980	+0.445
4	35	(Belgium) Eric van de Poele	Lambo-Lamborghini	1:26.117	+0.582
5	21	(Italy) Emanuele Pirro	Dallara-Judd	1:26.305	+0.770
6	14	(France) Olivier Grouillard	Fondmetal-Ford	1:26.789	+1.254
7	34	(Italy) Nicola Larini	Lambo-Lamborghini	1:26.886	+1.351
8	31	(Portugal) Pedro Chaves	Coloni-Ford	1:31.239	+5.704

=== Qualifying report ===
Ayrton Senna claimed his 55th pole position from Riccardo Patrese, Alain Prost, Nigel Mansell and Gerhard Berger.

=== Qualifying classification ===
Pos	No	Driver	Constructor	Q1	Q2	Gap
1	1	(Brazil) Ayrton Senna	McLaren-Honda	1:21.877	1:43.633	—
2	6	(Italy) Riccardo Patrese	Williams-Renault	1:21.957	1:42.455	+0.080
3	27	(France) Alain Prost	Ferrari	1:22.195	1:42.429	+0.318
4	5	(United Kingdom) Nigel Mansell	Williams-Renault	1:22.366	1:41.878	+0.489
5	2	(Austria) Gerhard Berger	McLaren-Honda	1:22.567	1:40.322	+0.690
6	4	(Italy) Stefano Modena	Tyrrell-Honda	1:23.511	1:44.613	+1.634
7	28	(France) Jean Alesi	Ferrari	1:23.945	1:41.149	+2.068
8	24	(Italy) Gianni Morbidelli	Minardi-Ferrari	1:24.762	no time	+2.885
9	23	(Italy) Pierluigi Martini	Minardi-Ferrari	1:24.807	no time	+2.930
10	3	(Japan) Satoru Nakajima	Tyrrell-Honda	1:25.345	1:42.063	+3.468
11	33	(Italy) Andrea de Cesaris	Jordan-Ford	1:25.491	1:44.118	+3.614
12	32	(Belgium) Bertrand Gachot	Jordan-Ford	1:25.531	1:44.897	+3.654
13	19	(Brazil) Roberto Moreno	Benetton-Ford	1:25.655	1:45.216	+3.778
14	20	(Brazil) Nelson Piquet	Benetton-Ford	1:25.809	1:42.911	+3.932
15	15	(Brazil) Maurício Gugelmin	Leyton House-Ilmor	1:25.841	no time	+3.964
16	22	(Finland) JJ Lehto	Dallara-Judd	1:25.974	1:43.397	+4.097
17	29	(France) Éric Bernard	Lola-Ford	1:25.983	no time	+4.106
18	7	(United Kingdom) Martin Brundle	Brabham-Yamaha	1:26.055	no time	+4.178
19	26	(France) Érik Comas	Ligier-Lamborghini	1:26.207	1:46.667	+4.330
20	30	(Japan) Aguri Suzuki	Lola-Ford	1:26.356	no time	+4.479
21	35	(Belgium) Eric van de Poele	Lambo-Lamborghini	1:26.550	1:47.619	+4.673
22	16	(Italy) Ivan Capelli	Leyton House-Ilmor	1:26.602	1:52.949	+4.725
23	8	(United Kingdom) Mark Blundell	Brabham-Yamaha	1:26.778	1:49.539	+4.901
24	25	(Belgium) Thierry Boutsen	Ligier-Lamborghini	1:26.998	1:44.125	+5.121
25	11	(Finland) Mika Häkkinen	Lotus-Judd	1:27.324	1:47.444	+5.447
26	12	(United Kingdom) Julian Bailey	Lotus-Judd	1:27.976	1:45.931	+6.099
27	17	(Italy) Gabriele Tarquini	AGS-Ford	1:28.175	no time	+6.298
28	18	(Italy) Fabrizio Barbazza	AGS-Ford	1:29.665	no time	+7.788
29	10	(Italy) Alex Caffi	Footwork-Porsche	1:30.280	2:06.589	+8.403
30	9	(Italy) Michele Alboreto	Footwork-Porsche	1:30.762	19:39.741	+8.885

== Race ==
=== Race report ===
The formation lap saw two dramatic incidents: Prost spun off the track at Rivazza Turn, followed by Berger, who was able to continue. However Prost stalled the engine and did not take the start.

At the lights, Patrese took the lead ahead of Senna, whilst Mansell, already slow off the line with gearbox problems, retired near the end of lap 1 after a collision with Martin Brundle. He was followed out by Nelson Piquet who spun off on lap 2, Aguri Suzuki who spun off on lap 3 behind the leaders and Jean Alesi who also spun off on lap 3 attempting a rather foolhardy pass on Stefano Modena.

In a strong lead, Patrese pitted for originally what appeared to be an early stop to slicks turned out to be more serious – a misfire with a faulty camshaft sensor. He restarted last before retiring for good 9 laps later.

Berger was catching Senna, lapping 1.5 seconds quicker than his teammate. The lead was soon down to 5 seconds, with Modena a superb third from Satoru Nakajima and the two Minardis of Pierluigi Martini and Gianni Morbidelli.

Both McLarens pitted for tyres with Senna maintaining his lead. Just after setting fastest lap, Berger was delayed in traffic, held up by the trio of Maurício Gugelmin, Julian Bailey and Thierry Boutsen. Bailey himself moved past Andrea de Cesaris into 6th, whilst Nakajima retired with transmission problems.

Ivan Capelli spun into retirement from fourth to hand over to JJ Lehto's Dallara. Modena retired with transmission problems which meant that behind the two dominant McLarens, the order was now Roberto Moreno, Lehto, Eric van de Poele for the little Modena team and Martini's Minardi. Meanwhile, de Cesaris eventually retired in the pits with gearbox problems on lap 38.

Moreno's gearbox broke on lap 52 causing him to retire, whilst Senna was having problems with oil pressure caused by the special high-torque Honda V12. As the Leyton House of Maurício Gugelmin eventually retired with an engine failure on lap 58. Berger put in a series of fastest laps to cut Senna's lead to just 1.7s at the line. Eric van de Poele had retired on the last lap as the result of fuel pump problems.

Lehto was overjoyed to gain the first and only podium place of his career for Dallara, with Martini fourth. Van de Poele's drive ended when a fuel pump broke on the last lap – he was classified ninth overall. The Lotus drivers of Mika Häkkinen and Bailey took fifth and sixth, both scoring their first world championship points, an unexpected result for the troubled team since their cars had barely managed to get on to the grid with Häkkinen 25th and Bailey 26th. This race was also noted for being the only Formula One point for Julian Bailey.

=== Race classification ===
Pos	No	Driver	Constructor	Laps	Time/Retired	Grid	Points
1	1	(Brazil) Ayrton Senna	McLaren-Honda	61	1:35:14.750	1	10
2	2	(Austria) Gerhard Berger	McLaren-Honda	61	+ 1.675	5	6
3	22	(Finland) JJ Lehto	Dallara-Judd	60	+ 1 lap	16	4
4	23	(Italy) Pierluigi Martini	Minardi-Ferrari	59	+ 2 laps	9	3
5	11	(Finland) Mika Häkkinen	Lotus-Judd	58	+ 3 laps	25	2
6	12	(United Kingdom) Julian Bailey	Lotus-Judd	58	+ 3 laps	26	1
7	25	(Belgium) Thierry Boutsen	Ligier-Lamborghini	58	+ 3 laps	24	
8	8	(United Kingdom) Mark Blundell	Brabham-Yamaha	58	+ 3 laps	23	
9	35	(Belgium) Eric van de Poele	Lambo-Lamborghini	57	Fuel pump	21	
10	26	(France) Érik Comas	Ligier-Lamborghini	57	+ 4 laps	19	
11	7	(United Kingdom) Martin Brundle	Brabham-Yamaha	57	+ 4 laps	18	
12	15	(Brazil) Maurício Gugelmin	Leyton House-Ilmor	55	Engine	15	
13	19	(Brazil) Roberto Moreno	Benetton-Ford	54	Gearbox	13	
Ret	4	(Italy) Stefano Modena	Tyrrell-Honda	41	Transmission	6	
Ret	33	(Italy) Andrea de Cesaris	Jordan-Ford	37	Gearbox	11	
Ret	32	(Belgium) Bertrand Gachot	Jordan-Ford	37	Suspension	12	
Ret	16	(Italy) Ivan Capelli	Leyton House-Ilmor	24	Spun off	22	
Ret	29	(France) Éric Bernard	Lola-Ford	17	Engine	17	
Ret	6	(Italy) Riccardo Patrese	Williams-Renault	17	Electrical misfire	2	
Ret	3	(Japan) Satoru Nakajima	Tyrrell-Honda	15	Transmission	10	
Ret	24	(Italy) Gianni Morbidelli	Minardi-Ferrari	10	Gearbox	8	
Ret	28	(France) Jean Alesi	Ferrari	2	Spun off	7	
Ret	30	(Japan) Aguri Suzuki	Lola-Ford	2	Spun off	20	
Ret	20	(Brazil) Nelson Piquet	Benetton-Ford	1	Spun off	14	
Ret	5	(United Kingdom) Nigel Mansell	Williams-Renault	0	Collision	4	
DNS	27	(France) Alain Prost	Ferrari	0	Spun off	3	
DNQ	17	(Italy) Gabriele Tarquini	AGS-Ford				
DNQ	18	(Italy) Fabrizio Barbazza	AGS-Ford				
DNQ	10	(Italy) Alex Caffi	Footwork-Porsche				
DNQ	9	(Italy) Michele Alboreto	Footwork-Porsche				
DNPQ	21	(Italy) Emanuele Pirro	Dallara-Judd				
DNPQ	14	(France) Olivier Grouillard	Fondmetal-Ford				
DNPQ	34	(Italy) Nicola Larini	Lambo-Lamborghini				
DNPQ	31	(Portugal) Pedro Chaves	Coloni-Ford				

== Championship standings after the race ==
Drivers' Championship standings

	Pos	Driver	Points
	1	(Brazil) Ayrton Senna	30
3	2	(Austria) Gerhard Berger	10
1	3	(France) Alain Prost	9
1	4	(Italy) Riccardo Patrese	6
1	5	(Brazil) Nelson Piquet	6

Constructors' Championship standings

Pos	Constructor	Points
1	(United Kingdom) McLaren-Honda	40
2	(Italy) Ferrari	10
3	(United Kingdom) Williams-Renault	6
4	(United Kingdom) Benetton-Ford	6
5	(United Kingdom) Tyrrell-Honda	5

- Note: Only the top five positions are included for both sets of standings.

Previous race: 1991 Brazilian Grand Prix	FIA Formula One World Championship; 1991 season	Next race: 1991 Monaco Grand Prix
Previous race: 1990 San Marino Grand Prix	San Marino Grand Prix	Next race: 1992 San Marino Grand Prix
