= 1991 Hungarian Grand Prix =

- Race 10 of 16 in the 1991 Formula One World Championship

Race details
- Date: 11 August 1991
- Official name: VII Magyar Nagydíj
- Location: Hungaroring; Mogyoród, Pest, Hungary
- Course: Permanent racing facility
- Course length: 3.968 km (2.466 miles)
- Distance: 77 laps, 305.536 km (189.850 miles)
- Weather: Hot dry, sunny

Pole position
| Driver | (Brazil) Ayrton Senna | McLaren-Honda |
- Time: 1:16.147

Fastest lap
| Driver | (Belgium) Bertrand Gachot | Jordan-Ford |
- Time: 1:21.547 on lap 71

Podium
| First | (Brazil) Ayrton Senna | McLaren-Honda |
| Second | (United Kingdom) Nigel Mansell | Williams-Renault |
| Third | (Italy) Riccardo Patrese | Williams-Renault |

The 1991 Hungarian Grand Prix was a Formula One motor race held at Hungaroring on 11 August 1991. It was the tenth race of the 1991 Formula One World Championship. The 77-lap race was won from pole position by Ayrton Senna, driving a McLaren-Honda, with the Williams-Renaults of Nigel Mansell and Riccardo Patrese second and third respectively.

== Qualifying ==
=== Pre-qualifying report ===
In the Friday morning pre-qualifying session, a Brabham topped the time sheets for the second Grand Prix in succession. However, this time it was Mark Blundell who was fastest, over 1.4 seconds faster than his team-mate Martin Brundle in second. Third was Olivier Grouillard for Fondmetal, the third time the Frenchman had pre-qualified this season. The fourth pre-qualifier was Michele Alboreto in the Footwork.

The four entrants who failed to pre-qualify were, unusually, within two seconds of the slowest pre-qualifier. Fifth was Gabriele Tarquini in the AGS, less than two tenths of a second slower than Alboreto. Alex Caffi was sixth in the other Footwork, 1.4 seconds behind Tarquini. Just a tenth further back was the other AGS of Fabrizio Barbazza, who was only two tenths faster than the Coloni of Pedro Chaves. It was the Portuguese driver's tenth failure to pre-qualify from ten attempts this season.

=== Pre-qualifying classification ===
| Pos | No | Driver | Constructor | Time | Gap |
|---|---|---|---|---|---|
| 1 | 8 | (United Kingdom) Mark Blundell | Brabham-Yamaha | 1:22.290 | — |
| 2 | 7 | (United Kingdom) Martin Brundle | Brabham-Yamaha | 1:23.716 | +1.426 |
| 3 | 14 | (France) Olivier Grouillard | Fondmetal-Ford | 1:24.816 | +2.526 |
| 4 | 9 | (Italy) Michele Alboreto | Footwork-Ford | 1:25.045 | +2.755 |
| 5 | 17 | (Italy) Gabriele Tarquini | AGS-Ford | 1:25.230 | +2.940 |
| 6 | 10 | (Italy) Alex Caffi | Footwork-Ford | 1:26.637 | +4.347 |
| 7 | 18 | (Italy) Fabrizio Barbazza | AGS-Ford | 1:26.740 | +4.450 |
| 8 | 31 | (Portugal) Pedro Chaves | Coloni-Ford | 1:26.945 | +4.655 |

=== Qualifying report ===
Nigel Mansell and Williams were on a roll as Formula One arrived in Hungary, while Ayrton Senna and Alain Prost were ordered by FISA to work out their differences following their confrontation in the German Grand Prix. Senna was also angry with his McLaren team after he had run out of fuel in the two previous races, losing valuable points to Mansell. During the practice session, McLaren made the first test for the semi-automatic gearbox on their car. Senna proceeded to dominate qualifying, taking pole by over a second from Riccardo Patrese, Mansell, Prost, Gerhard Berger, Jean Alesi, Emanuele Pirro, Stefano Modena, Ivan Capelli, and Martin Brundle.

=== Qualifying classification ===
| Pos | No | Driver | Constructor | Q1 | Q2 | Gap |
|---|---|---|---|---|---|---|
| 1 | 1 | (Brazil) Ayrton Senna | McLaren-Honda | 1:18.549 | 1:16.147 | — |
| 2 | 6 | (Italy) Riccardo Patrese | Williams-Renault | 1:20.103 | 1:17.379 | +1.232 |
| 3 | 5 | (United Kingdom) Nigel Mansell | Williams-Renault | 1:19.818 | 1:17.389 | +1.242 |
| 4 | 27 | (France) Alain Prost | Ferrari | 1:19.326 | 1:17.690 | +1.543 |
| 5 | 2 | (Austria) Gerhard Berger | McLaren-Honda | 1:18.238 | 1:17.705 | +1.558 |
| 6 | 28 | (France) Jean Alesi | Ferrari | 1:19.552 | 1:18.410 | +2.263 |
| 7 | 21 | (Italy) Emanuele Pirro | Dallara-Judd | 1:21.751 | 1:19.334 | +3.187 |
| 8 | 4 | (Italy) Stefano Modena | Tyrrell-Honda | 1:20.488 | 1:19.748 | +3.601 |
| 9 | 16 | (Italy) Ivan Capelli | Leyton House-Ilmor | 1:21.068 | 1:19.794 | +3.647 |
| 10 | 7 | (United Kingdom) Martin Brundle | Brabham-Yamaha | 1:21.345 | 1:19.976 | +3.829 |
| 11 | 20 | (Brazil) Nelson Piquet | Benetton-Ford | 1:21.542 | 1:19.984 | +3.837 |
| 12 | 22 | (Finland) JJ Lehto | Dallara-Judd | 1:21.991 | 1:20.014 | +3.867 |
| 13 | 15 | (Brazil) Maurício Gugelmin | Leyton House-Ilmor | 1:21.549 | 1:20.024 | +3.877 |
| 14 | 3 | (Japan) Satoru Nakajima | Tyrrell-Honda | 1:22.992 | 1:20.565 | +4.418 |
| 15 | 19 | (Brazil) Roberto Moreno | Benetton-Ford | 1:22.077 | 1:20.584 | +4.437 |
| 16 | 32 | (Belgium) Bertrand Gachot | Jordan-Ford | 1:21.884 | 1:20.655 | +4.508 |
| 17 | 33 | (Italy) Andrea de Cesaris | Jordan-Ford | 1:22.143 | 1:20.805 | +4.658 |
| 18 | 23 | (Italy) Pierluigi Martini | Minardi-Ferrari | 1:22.429 | 1:20.823 | +4.676 |
| 19 | 25 | (Belgium) Thierry Boutsen | Ligier-Lamborghini | 1:22.408 | 1:20.870 | +4.723 |
| 20 | 8 | (United Kingdom) Mark Blundell | Brabham-Yamaha | 1:21.125 | 1:20.954 | +4.807 |
| 21 | 29 | (France) Éric Bernard | Lola-Ford | 1:22.680 | 1:21.267 | +5.120 |
| 22 | 30 | (Japan) Aguri Suzuki | Lola-Ford | 1:22.762 | 1:21.601 | +5.454 |
| 23 | 24 | (Italy) Gianni Morbidelli | Minardi-Ferrari | 1:23.201 | 1:21.654 | +5.507 |
| 24 | 34 | (Italy) Nicola Larini | Lambo-Lamborghini | 1:24.316 | 1:21.896 | +5.749 |
| 25 | 26 | (France) Érik Comas | Ligier-Lamborghini | 1:24.464 | 1:22.258 | +6.111 |
| 26 | 11 | (Finland) Mika Häkkinen | Lotus-Judd | 1:25.224 | 1:22.335 | +6.188 |
| 27 | 14 | (France) Olivier Grouillard | Fondmetal-Ford | 1:23.593 | 1:22.438 | +6.291 |
| 28 | 9 | (Italy) Michele Alboreto | Footwork-Ford | 1:24.593 | 1:22.521 | +6.374 |
| 29 | 35 | (Belgium) Eric van de Poele | Lambo-Lamborghini | 1:27.339 | 1:23.162 | +7.015 |
| 30 | 12 | (Germany) Michael Bartels | Lotus-Judd | 1:24.746 | 1:23.248 | +7.101 |

== Race ==
=== Race report ===
At the start, Senna and Patrese both got away well, but Senna managed to keep the lead, with Mansell, Prost, Berger, and Alesi rounding out the top six. Mansell followed and hounded his teammate, but Senna was unable to pull out a significant gap. Meanwhile, Prost's day ended early with an engine failure, just adding to the misery that was the 1991 season for the three-time champion. Mansell eventually got past Patrese and set off after Senna, but on a track that is not conducive to passing, he had to settle for second. Senna duly won from Mansell, Patrese, Berger, Alesi, and Capelli. Senna now led the world championship by 12 points as the teams packed up and headed to Belgium. Senna dedicated this victory to the late Soichiro Honda, founder of Honda, who died days before the Grand Prix weekend.

=== Race classification ===
| Pos | No | Driver | Constructor | Laps | Time/Retired | Grid | Points |
|---|---|---|---|---|---|---|---|
| 1 | 1 | (Brazil) Ayrton Senna | McLaren-Honda | 77 | 1:49:12.796 | 1 | 10 |
| 2 | 5 | (United Kingdom) Nigel Mansell | Williams-Renault | 77 | + 4.599 | 3 | 6 |
| 3 | 6 | (Italy) Riccardo Patrese | Williams-Renault | 77 | + 15.594 | 2 | 4 |
| 4 | 2 | (Austria) Gerhard Berger | McLaren-Honda | 77 | + 21.856 | 5 | 3 |
| 5 | 28 | (France) Jean Alesi | Ferrari | 77 | + 31.389 | 6 | 2 |
| 6 | 16 | (Italy) Ivan Capelli | Leyton House-Ilmor | 76 | + 1 lap | 9 | 1 |
| 7 | 33 | (Italy) Andrea de Cesaris | Jordan-Ford | 76 | + 1 lap | 17 | |
| 8 | 19 | (Brazil) Roberto Moreno | Benetton-Ford | 76 | + 1 lap | 15 | |
| 9 | 32 | (Belgium) Bertrand Gachot | Jordan-Ford | 76 | + 1 lap | 16 | |
| 10 | 26 | (France) Érik Comas | Ligier-Lamborghini | 75 | + 2 laps | 25 | |
| 11 | 15 | (Brazil) Maurício Gugelmin | Leyton House-Ilmor | 75 | + 2 laps | 13 | |
| 12 | 4 | (Italy) Stefano Modena | Tyrrell-Honda | 75 | + 2 laps | 8 | |
| 13 | 24 | (Italy) Gianni Morbidelli | Minardi-Ferrari | 75 | + 2 laps | 23 | |
| 14 | 11 | (Finland) Mika Häkkinen | Lotus-Judd | 74 | + 3 laps | 26 | |
| 15 | 3 | (Japan) Satoru Nakajima | Tyrrell-Honda | 74 | + 3 laps | 14 | |
| 16 | 34 | (Italy) Nicola Larini | Lambo-Lamborghini | 74 | + 3 laps | 24 | |
| 17 | 25 | (Belgium) Thierry Boutsen | Ligier-Lamborghini | 71 | Engine | 19 | |
| Ret | 23 | (Italy) Pierluigi Martini | Minardi-Ferrari | 65 | Engine | 18 | |
| Ret | 8 | (United Kingdom) Mark Blundell | Brabham-Yamaha | 62 | Tyre | 20 | |
| Ret | 7 | (United Kingdom) Martin Brundle | Brabham-Yamaha | 59 | Physical | 10 | |
| Ret | 22 | (Finland) JJ Lehto | Dallara-Judd | 49 | Engine | 12 | |
| Ret | 20 | (Brazil) Nelson Piquet | Benetton-Ford | 38 | Gearbox | 11 | |
| Ret | 29 | (France) Éric Bernard | Lola-Ford | 38 | Engine | 21 | |
| Ret | 30 | (Japan) Aguri Suzuki | Lola-Ford | 38 | Engine | 22 | |
| Ret | 21 | (Italy) Emanuele Pirro | Dallara-Judd | 37 | Engine | 7 | |
| Ret | 27 | (France) Alain Prost | Ferrari | 28 | Engine | 4 | |
| DNQ | 14 | (France) Olivier Grouillard | Fondmetal-Ford | | | | |
| DNQ | 9 | (Italy) Michele Alboreto | Footwork-Ford | | | | |
| DNQ | 35 | (Belgium) Eric van de Poele | Lambo-Lamborghini | | | | |
| DNQ | 12 | (Germany) Michael Bartels | Lotus-Judd | | | | |
| DNPQ | 17 | (Italy) Gabriele Tarquini | AGS-Ford | | | | |
| DNPQ | 10 | (Italy) Alex Caffi | Footwork-Ford | | | | |
| DNPQ | 18 | (Italy) Fabrizio Barbazza | AGS-Ford | | | | |
| DNPQ | 31 | (Portugal) Pedro Chaves | Coloni-Ford | | | | |

== Championship standings after the race ==
Drivers' Championship standings

| | Pos | Driver | Points |
|---|---|---|---|
| | 1 | (Brazil) Ayrton Senna | 61 |
| | 2 | (United Kingdom) Nigel Mansell | 49 |
| | 3 | (Italy) Riccardo Patrese | 32 |
| 1 | 4 | (Austria) Gerhard Berger | 22 |
| 1 | 5 | (France) Alain Prost | 21 |

Constructors' Championship standings

| | Pos | Constructor | Points |
|---|---|---|---|
| 1 | 1 | (United Kingdom) McLaren-Honda | 83 |
| 1 | 2 | (United Kingdom) Williams-Renault | 81 |
| | 3 | (Italy) Ferrari | 35 |
| | 4 | (United Kingdom) Benetton-Ford | 23 |
| | 5 | (Republic of Ireland) Jordan-Ford | 13 |

- Note: Only the top five positions are included for both sets of standings.

| Previous race: 1991 German Grand Prix | FIA Formula One World Championship; 1991 season | Next race: 1991 Belgian Grand Prix |
| Previous race: 1990 Hungarian Grand Prix | Hungarian Grand Prix | Next race: 1992 Hungarian Grand Prix |
