= 1991 Monaco Grand Prix =

Coordinates: 43°44′4.74″N 7°25′16.8″E

- Race 4 of 16 in the 1991 Formula One World Championship
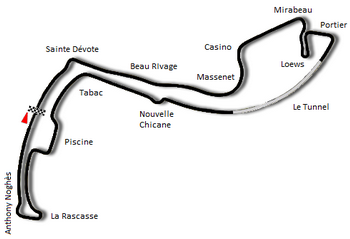

Race details
- Date: 12 May 1991
- Official name: XLIX Grand Prix Automobile de Monaco
- Location: Circuit de Monaco, Monte Carlo
- Course: Street circuit
- Course length: 3.328 km (2.068 miles)
- Distance: 78 laps, 259.584 km (161.298 miles)
- Weather: Cloudy, mild, dry

Pole position
Driver	(Brazil) Ayrton Senna	McLaren-Honda
- Time: 1:20.344

Fastest lap
Driver	(France) Alain Prost	Ferrari
- Time: 1:24.368 on lap 77

Podium
First	(Brazil) Ayrton Senna	McLaren-Honda
Second	(United Kingdom) Nigel Mansell	Williams-Renault
Third	(France) Jean Alesi	Ferrari

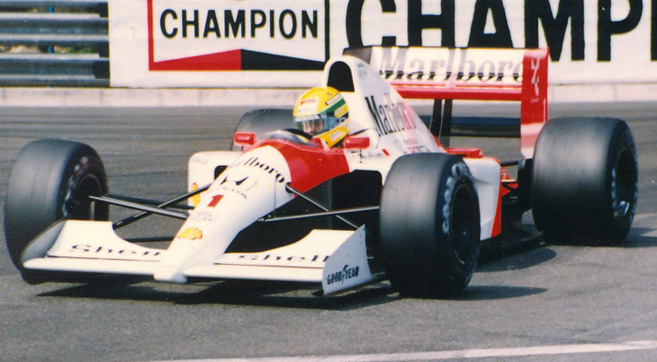
The race was won by Ayrton Senna in the McLaren.

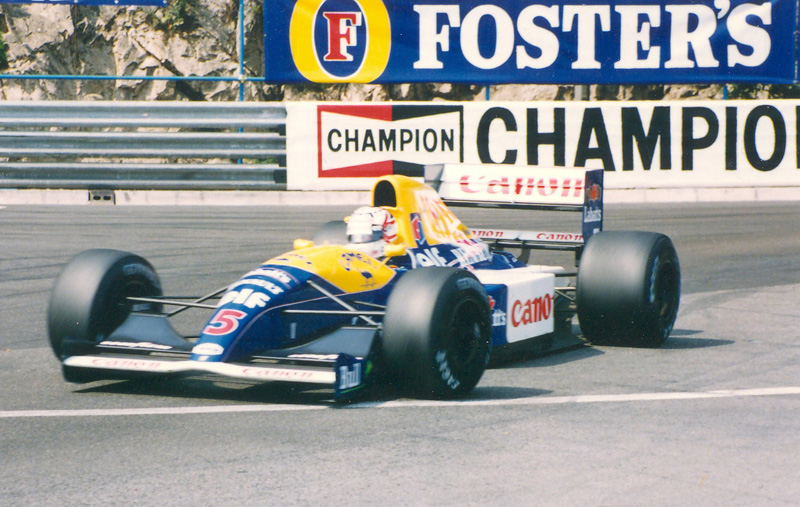
Nigel Mansell finished in second place, scoring his first points of the season.

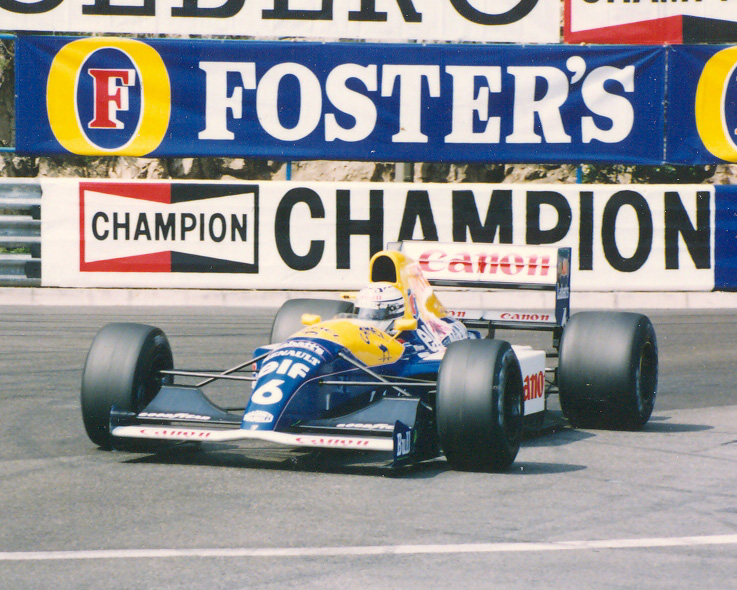
Mansell's team-mate, Riccardo Patrese, ran in third place until crashing on oil dropped by Stefano Modena, whose engine expired just ahead of him.

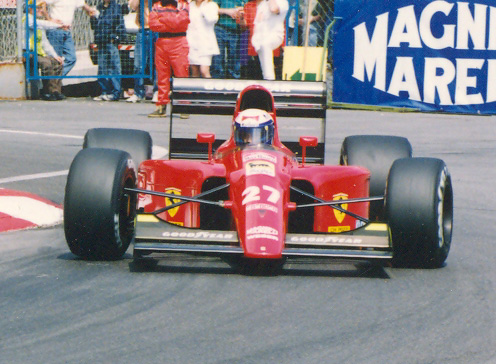
Alain Prost finished in fifth position after being delayed by a slow late-race pit stop.

The 1991 Monaco Grand Prix was a Formula One motor race held at Monaco on 12 May 1991. It was the fourth race of the 1991 Formula One World Championship.

The 78-lap race was won from pole position by Brazilian driver Ayrton Senna, driving a McLaren-Honda. It was Senna's fourth victory from the first four races of the season, and his fourth Monaco win. Englishman Nigel Mansell finished second in a Williams-Renault, with Frenchman Jean Alesi third in a Ferrari.

== Qualifying ==
=== Pre-qualifying report ===
The pre-qualifying session on Thursday morning ended up being somewhat straightforward for Dallara and Jordan. JJ Lehto was fastest for Dallara, with Emanuele Pirro in third, with Jordan's Andrea de Cesaris and Bertrand Gachot second and fourth.

Gachot was over a second faster than the fifth-placed car, the Modena Lambo of Nicola Larini. The other Lambo of Eric van de Poele was sixth, with Pedro Chaves seventh in the Coloni on his first experience of the Monaco circuit. Olivier Grouillard propped up the time sheets for Fondmetal as he continued to gain experience in the new Fomet car.

=== Pre-qualifying classification ===
Pos	No	Driver	Constructor	Time	Gap
1	22	(Finland) JJ Lehto	Dallara-Judd	1:23.260	—
2	33	(Italy) Andrea de Cesaris	Jordan-Ford	1:23.538	+0.278
3	21	(Italy) Emanuele Pirro	Dallara-Judd	1:24.421	+1.161
4	32	(Belgium) Bertrand Gachot	Jordan-Ford	1:24.802	+1.542
5	34	(Italy) Nicola Larini	Lambo-Lamborghini	1:25.893	+2.633
6	35	(Belgium) Eric van de Poele	Lambo-Lamborghini	1:26.282	+3.022
7	31	(Portugal) Pedro Chaves	Coloni-Ford	1:27.389	+4.129
8	14	(France) Olivier Grouillard	Fondmetal-Ford	1:27.759	+4.499

=== Qualifying report ===
Ayrton Senna shocked no-one by taking pole position, but second place was a surprise with Stefano Modena taking full advantage of the superior Pirelli qualifying tyres to be second, followed by Patrese, Piquet, a disappointed Mansell, Berger, Prost, Moreno, Alesi, and de Cesaris. Alex Caffi had a huge accident in the swimming pool section on Saturday, after missing Thursday qualifying with a gearbox problem, and did not participate in the race. Elsewhere Martin Brundle was excluded for missing a weight check in Thursday practice.

=== Qualifying classification ===
Pos	No	Driver	Constructor	Q1	Q2	Gap
1	1	(Brazil) Ayrton Senna	McLaren-Honda	1:20.508	1:20.344	—
2	4	(Italy) Stefano Modena	Tyrrell-Honda	1:23.442	1:20.809	+0.465
3	6	(Italy) Riccardo Patrese	Williams-Renault	1:22.057	1:20.973	+0.629
4	20	(Brazil) Nelson Piquet	Benetton-Ford	1:22.816	1:21.159	+0.815
5	5	(United Kingdom) Nigel Mansell	Williams-Renault	1:23.274	1:21.205	+0.861
6	2	(Austria) Gerhard Berger	McLaren-Honda	1:21.222	1:21.583	+0.878
7	27	(France) Alain Prost	Ferrari	1:22.113	1:21.455	+1.111
8	19	(Brazil) Roberto Moreno	Benetton-Ford	1:23.476	1:21.804	+1.460
9	28	(France) Jean Alesi	Ferrari	1:22.966	1:21.910	+1.566
10	33	(Italy) Andrea de Cesaris	Jordan-Ford	1:24.257	1:22.764	+2.420
11	3	(Japan) Satoru Nakajima	Tyrrell-Honda	1:24.435	1:22.972	+2.628
12	21	(Italy) Emanuele Pirro	Dallara-Judd	1:23.311	1:23.022	+2.678
13	22	(Finland) JJ Lehto	Dallara-Judd	1:23.023	1:23.983	+2.679
14	23	(Italy) Pierluigi Martini	Minardi-Ferrari	1:24.101	1:23.064	+2.720
15	15	(Brazil) Maurício Gugelmin	Leyton House-Ilmor	1:24.920	1:23.394	+3.050
16	25	(Belgium) Thierry Boutsen	Ligier-Lamborghini	1:24.728	1:23.431	+3.087
17	24	(Italy) Gianni Morbidelli	Minardi-Ferrari	1:24.481	1:23.584	+3.240
18	16	(Italy) Ivan Capelli	Leyton House-Ilmor	1:25.040	1:23.642	+3.298
19	30	(Japan) Aguri Suzuki	Lola-Ford	1:26.380	1:23.898	+3.554
20	17	(Italy) Gabriele Tarquini	AGS-Ford	1:25.078	1:23.909	+3.565
21	29	(France) Éric Bernard	Lola-Ford	1:25.370	1:24.079	+3.735
22	8	(United Kingdom) Mark Blundell	Brabham-Yamaha	1:25.500	1:24.109	+3.765
23	26	(France) Érik Comas	Ligier-Lamborghini	1:24.747	1:24.151	+3.807
24	32	(Belgium) Bertrand Gachot	Jordan-Ford	1:24.540	1:24.208	+3.864
25	9	(Italy) Michele Alboreto	Footwork-Porsche	1:27.843	1:24.606	+4.262
26	11	(Finland) Mika Häkkinen	Lotus-Judd	1:24.868	1:24.829	+4.485
27	12	(United Kingdom) Julian Bailey	Lotus-Judd	1:28.772	1:26.995	+6.651
28	18	(Italy) Fabrizio Barbazza	AGS-Ford	1:28.060	1:27.079	+6.735
29	10	(Italy) Alex Caffi	Footwork-Porsche	no time	no time	—
EX	7	(United Kingdom) Martin Brundle	Brabham-Yamaha	—	—	—

== Race ==
=== Race report ===
At the start, Senna got away well followed by Modena, Patrese, Mansell, and Prost. In the usual first corner mayhem Berger ran into the back of Piquet, dropping the Austrian to the back of the pack and breaking Piquet's suspension, Berger would later crash out. Senna quickly built up a huge lead over Modena and Patrese. Meanwhile, Andrea de Cesaris in the Jordan was eventually catching up to Jean Alesi and just outside the points in 7th place before retiring shortly after battling with the second Ferrari with a sticking throttle. Meanwhile, Aguri Suzuki in the Lola hit the wall at St. Devote on lap 25 with braking problems, as Modena's teammate Satoru Nakajima had spun and retired at the Nouvelle Chicane after making contact with Martini. Stefano Modena was blocked for a few laps by Emanuele Pirro in the Dallara who ignored blue flags, leading to a typically blunt verdict from the BBC's James Hunt, saying "This is disgraceful driving by Emanuele Pirro". Most of Senna's chasers were eliminated on lap 42 when Modena's engine blew in the tunnel, spreading oil on the track which caused Patrese to crash. Alboreto also retired with engine failure at the same time. Just after taking 10th place from Eric Bernard, Blundell's Brabham lost control because of the oil from Modena's Tyrrell and crashed at the chicane. Senna now had a huge lead over Prost and Mansell, but the Englishman passed Prost with a daring move going into the chicane, and eventually started flying despite having problems earlier in the race. Prost would later pit to repair a damaged wheel causing a slow puncture, but the stop was very long and he dropped down to fifth.

Senna won his fourth Monaco Grand Prix in five years by 18 seconds over Mansell, Alesi, Moreno, Prost, and Pirro. The second-place finish was Nigel Mansell's first points of the season. As Senna was slowing down after finishing the race, the pit crew mistakenly ordered him to take another lap, believing that he had crossed for the final lap.

=== Race classification ===
Pos	No	Driver	Constructor	Laps	Time/Retired	Grid	Points
1	1	(Brazil) Ayrton Senna	McLaren-Honda	78	1:53:02.334	1	10
2	5	(United Kingdom) Nigel Mansell	Williams-Renault	78	+ 18.348	5	6
3	28	(France) Jean Alesi	Ferrari	78	+ 47.455	9	4
4	19	(Brazil) Roberto Moreno	Benetton-Ford	77	+ 1 lap	8	3
5	27	(France) Alain Prost	Ferrari	77	+ 1 lap	7	2
6	21	(Italy) Emanuele Pirro	Dallara-Judd	77	+ 1 lap	12	1
7	25	(Belgium) Thierry Boutsen	Ligier-Lamborghini	76	+ 2 laps	16	
8	32	(Belgium) Bertrand Gachot	Jordan-Ford	76	+ 2 laps	24	
9	29	(France) Éric Bernard	Lola-Ford	76	+ 2 laps	21	
10	26	(France) Érik Comas	Ligier-Lamborghini	76	+ 2 laps	23	
11	22	(Finland) JJ Lehto	Dallara-Judd	75	+ 3 laps	13	
12	23	(Italy) Pierluigi Martini	Minardi-Ferrari	72	+ 6 laps	14	
Ret	11	(Finland) Mika Häkkinen	Lotus-Judd	64	Oil leak	26	
Ret	24	(Italy) Gianni Morbidelli	Minardi-Ferrari	49	Gearbox	17	
Ret	15	(Brazil) Maurício Gugelmin	Leyton House-Ilmor	43	Throttle	15	
Ret	4	(Italy) Stefano Modena	Tyrrell-Honda	42	Engine/Oil leak	2	
Ret	6	(Italy) Riccardo Patrese	Williams-Renault	42	Accident	3	
Ret	8	(United Kingdom) Mark Blundell	Brabham-Yamaha	41	Spun off	22	
Ret	9	(Italy) Michele Alboreto	Footwork-Porsche	39	Engine	25	
Ret	3	(Japan) Satoru Nakajima	Tyrrell-Honda	35	Spun off	11	
Ret	30	(Japan) Aguri Suzuki	Lola-Ford	24	Brakes	19	
Ret	33	(Italy) Andrea de Cesaris	Jordan-Ford	21	Throttle	10	
Ret	16	(Italy) Ivan Capelli	Leyton House-Ilmor	12	Brakes	18	
Ret	17	(Italy) Gabriele Tarquini	AGS-Ford	9	Gearbox	20	
Ret	2	(Austria) Gerhard Berger	McLaren-Honda	9	Accident	6	
Ret	20	(Brazil) Nelson Piquet	Benetton-Ford	0	Suspension	4	
DNQ	12	(United Kingdom) Julian Bailey	Lotus-Judd				
DNQ	18	(Italy) Fabrizio Barbazza	AGS-Ford				
DNQ	10	(Italy) Alex Caffi	Footwork-Porsche				
EX	7	(United Kingdom) Martin Brundle	Brabham-Yamaha				
DNPQ	34	(Italy) Nicola Larini	Lambo-Lamborghini				
DNPQ	35	(Belgium) Eric van de Poele	Lambo-Lamborghini				
DNPQ	31	(Portugal) Pedro Chaves	Coloni-Ford				
DNPQ	14	(France) Olivier Grouillard	Fondmetal-Ford				

== Championship standings after the race ==
Drivers' Championship standings

	Pos	Driver	Points
	1	(Brazil) Ayrton Senna	40
1	2	(France) Alain Prost	11
1	3	(Austria) Gerhard Berger	10
	4	(Italy) Riccardo Patrese	6
15	5	(United Kingdom) Nigel Mansell	6

Constructors' Championship standings

Pos	Constructor	Points
1	(United Kingdom) McLaren-Honda	50
2	(Italy) Ferrari	16
3	(United Kingdom) Williams-Renault	12
4	(United Kingdom) Benetton-Ford	9
5	(United Kingdom) Tyrrell-Honda	5

- Note: Only the top five positions are included for both sets of standings.

Previous race: 1991 San Marino Grand Prix	FIA Formula One World Championship; 1991 season	Next race: 1991 Canadian Grand Prix
Previous race: 1990 Monaco Grand Prix	Monaco Grand Prix	Next race: 1992 Monaco Grand Prix
