= 1991 Spanish Grand Prix =

- Race 14 of 16 in the 1991 Formula One World Championship
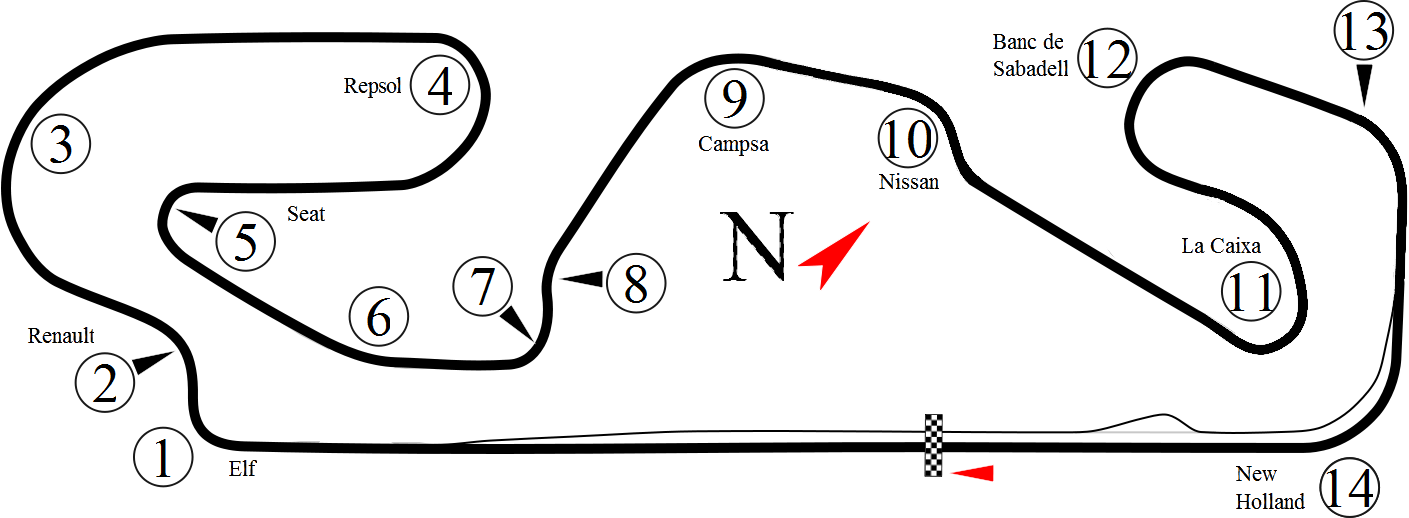

Race details
- Date: 29 September 1991
- Official name: XXXIII Gran Premio Tío Pepe de España
- Location: Circuit de Catalunya; Montmeló, Catalonia. Spain
- Course: Permanent racing facility
- Course length: 4.747 km (2.950 miles)
- Distance: 65 laps, 308.555 km (191.727 miles)
- Weather: Warm and overcast, drying
- Attendance: 60,000

Pole position
Driver	(Austria) Gerhard Berger	McLaren-Honda
- Time: 1:18.751

Fastest lap
Driver	(Italy) Riccardo Patrese	Williams-Renault
- Time: 1:22.837 on lap 63

Podium
First	(United Kingdom) Nigel Mansell	Williams-Renault
Second	(France) Alain Prost	Ferrari
Third	(Italy) Riccardo Patrese	Williams-Renault

The 1991 Spanish Grand Prix (formally the XXXIII Gran Premio Tío Pepe de España) was a Formula One motor race held on 29 September 1991 at the Circuit de Catalunya. It was the fourteenth race of the 1991 Formula One World Championship, and the first Spanish Grand Prix to be held at Circuit de Catalunya.

The 65-lap race was won by British driver Nigel Mansell, driving a Williams-Renault, after he started from second position. Frenchman Alain Prost finished second in a Ferrari, with Mansell's Italian teammate Riccardo Patrese third. Mansell's Drivers' Championship rival, Brazilian Ayrton Senna, finished fifth in his McLaren-Honda, meaning that he led Mansell by 16 points with two races remaining.

== Pre-race ==
There was a lot of action in the backrooms in the week separating the Portuguese and Spanish Grands Prix with the big news being that Max Mosley was elected president of the FISA, replacing Jean-Marie Balestre. There were also changes in the driver line-ups as Michael Bartels returned to Lotus replacing Johnny Herbert who had obligations in the Japanese Formula 3000. Jordan had replaced Roberto Moreno with young Italian rookie Alessandro Zanardi, and Fondmetal had sacked Olivier Grouillard and replaced him with Gabriele Tarquini of AGS, Grouillard promptly taking Tarquini's old seat. Championship challenger Nigel Mansell was limping all weekend, the Williams driver having injured his ankle in a football match.

== Qualifying ==
=== Pre-qualifying report ===
The pre-qualifying pool in Spain was reduced to seven entrants when Coloni driver Pedro Chaves refused to drive the car, frustrated at the lack of testing and the non-payment of his retainer. The team were unable to find another driver to attempt to pre-qualify the C4, so it stayed in the garage. Chaves had failed to pre-qualify on all 13 of his attempts this season, and did not drive for the team again.

Brabham secured their fifth consecutive 1–2 in the pre-qualifying session, with Martin Brundle a couple of tenths of a second faster than Mark Blundell. The third placed pre-qualifier, Michele Alboreto in the Footwork, was over two seconds behind Blundell. On his first outing for Fondmetal after the sacking of Olivier Grouillard, Gabriele Tarquini took the last pre-qualifying spot in the Fomet-1, 0.25 seconds behind Alboreto.

Alex Caffi missed out again in fifth place in the other Footwork, just 0.062 seconds slower than Tarquini. It was his fifth failure to pre-qualify in six attempts. Sixth was Fabrizio Barbazza in the AGS, just over half a second faster than his new team-mate Grouillard. It was to be their last appearances for the team as AGS withdrew from Formula One before the next event, having spent six seasons at the top level.

=== Pre-qualifying classification ===
Pos	No	Driver	Constructor	Time	Gap
1	7	(United Kingdom) Martin Brundle	Brabham-Yamaha	1:21.504	—
2	8	(United Kingdom) Mark Blundell	Brabham-Yamaha	1:21.727	+0.223
3	9	(Italy) Michele Alboreto	Footwork-Ford	1:23.744	+2.240
4	14	(Italy) Gabriele Tarquini	Fondmetal-Ford	1:23.994	+2.490
5	10	(Italy) Alex Caffi	Footwork-Ford	1:24.056	+2.552
6	18	(Italy) Fabrizio Barbazza	AGS-Ford	1:24.744	+3.240
7	17	(France) Olivier Grouillard	AGS-Ford	1:25.305	+3.801

=== Qualifying report ===
In qualifying Gerhard Berger did a favour to teammate Ayrton Senna by taking pole position from Mansell, Senna, Riccardo Patrese, Michael Schumacher, Alain Prost, Jean Alesi, Ivan Capelli, Emanuele Pirro and Nelson Piquet.

=== Qualifying classification ===
Pos	No	Driver	Constructor	Q1	Q2	Gap
1	2	(Austria) Gerhard Berger	McLaren-Honda	1:18.751	1:21.208	—
2	5	(United Kingdom) Nigel Mansell	Williams-Renault	1:18.970	1:19.971	+0.219
3	1	(Brazil) Ayrton Senna	McLaren-Honda	1:19.474	1:19.064	+0.313
4	6	(Italy) Riccardo Patrese	Williams-Renault	1:19.643	1:20.392	+0.892
5	19	(Germany) Michael Schumacher	Benetton-Ford	1:19.733	1:20.779	+0.982
6	27	(France) Alain Prost	Ferrari	1:20.245	1:19.936	+1.185
7	28	(France) Jean Alesi	Ferrari	1:20.197	1:20.690	+1.446
8	16	(Italy) Ivan Capelli	Leyton House-Ilmor	1:21.682	1:20.584	+1.833
9	21	(Italy) Emanuele Pirro	Dallara-Judd	1:21.250	1:20.651	+1.900
10	20	(Brazil) Nelson Piquet	Benetton-Ford	1:20.853	1:20.676	+1.925
11	7	(United Kingdom) Martin Brundle	Brabham-Yamaha	1:21.415	1:20.677	+1.926
12	8	(United Kingdom) Mark Blundell	Brabham-Yamaha	1:21.021	1:20.724	+1.973
13	15	(Brazil) Maurício Gugelmin	Leyton House-Ilmor	1:21.319	1:20.743	+1.992
14	4	(Italy) Stefano Modena	Tyrrell-Honda	1:20.788	1:21.576	+2.037
15	22	(Finland) JJ Lehto	Dallara-Judd	1:22.249	1:20.967	+2.216
16	24	(Italy) Gianni Morbidelli	Minardi-Ferrari	1:21.801	1:22.523	+3.050
17	33	(Italy) Andrea de Cesaris	Jordan-Ford	1:21.865	1:22.992	+3.114
18	3	(Japan) Satoru Nakajima	Tyrrell-Honda	1:22.480	1:22.114	+3.363
19	23	(Italy) Pierluigi Martini	Minardi-Ferrari	1:22.575	1:22.510	+3.759
20	32	(Italy) Alessandro Zanardi	Jordan-Ford	1:22.580	1:23.448	+3.829
21	11	(Finland) Mika Häkkinen	Lotus-Judd	1:22.646	1:23.407	+3.895
22	14	(Italy) Gabriele Tarquini	Fondmetal-Ford	1:22.837	1:26.214	+4.086
23	29	(France) Éric Bernard	Lola-Ford	1:22.944	1:23.883	+4.193
24	9	(Italy) Michele Alboreto	Footwork-Ford	1:23.145	1:23.868	+4.394
25	26	(France) Érik Comas	Ligier-Lamborghini	1:23.359	1:23.755	+4.608
26	25	(Belgium) Thierry Boutsen	Ligier-Lamborghini	1:23.553	1:23.623	+4.802
27	30	(Japan) Aguri Suzuki	Lola-Ford	1:24.211	1:26.346	+5.460
28	34	(Italy) Nicola Larini	Lambo-Lamborghini	1:25.330	1:26.109	+6.579
29	12	(Germany) Michael Bartels	Lotus-Judd	1:25.640	1:25.392	+6.641
30	35	(Belgium) Eric van de Poele	Lambo-Lamborghini	1:27.501	1:27.566	+8.750

== Race ==
=== Race report ===
On race morning it was raining, but by start time it had stopped, although the track was still wet. At the start Senna got away well and challenged Berger, while Mansell was right on his tail. Toward the end of lap one Schumacher surprised Mansell to take third place. At the back Éric Bernard and Érik Comas collided, both men being out on the spot. The track was incredibly slippery and there was a lot of action at the front with Senna, Schumacher, Mansell, and Alesi all fighting over third place, while Berger started to scamper away in the lead. Mansell tried to chase the leader and forced his way past Schumacher before setting off after Senna. Eventually he pounced on the main straight, the two great rivals going wheel to wheel, just millimetres apart, with Mansell taking the position and setting off after Berger. Prost was the first front-runner to stop for dry tyres, followed shortly by leader Berger, who had a very bad stop. Mansell and Senna both stopped on the same lap and it was the McLaren team who won the confrontation, getting Senna out ahead and into the lead from Berger, Mansell, and Schumacher.

On the following lap Senna let Berger through as Mansell was closing in. The rain returned and Senna had a dramatic spin at the last corner, dropping from second to fifth while Schumacher passed Prost for third. Mansell closed on Berger, and on lap 20 he made his way up the inside to take the lead and proceeded to pull away, while Berger came under pressure from the charging Schumacher. A close battle ended when Schumacher spun while trying to pass, he would stay in the race, but down in sixth place, which would become fifth when Berger retired with yet another electronic failure. The action continued for the major placings as Patrese passed Senna for third then Alesi blew past Senna for fourth after Schumacher pitted. Mansell duly took victory from Prost, Patrese, Alesi, Senna, and Schumacher, while the Minardi drivers ended the race red faced due to a last lap collision between Gianni Morbidelli and Pierluigi Martini. Mansell's win with Senna fifth meant that the title race was back on, but Senna still led by sixteen points as the teams headed on to Japan.

=== Race classification ===
Pos	No	Driver	Constructor	Laps	Time/Retired	Grid	Points
1	5	(United Kingdom) Nigel Mansell	Williams-Renault	65	1:38:41.541	2	10
2	27	(France) Alain Prost	Ferrari	65	+ 11.331	6	6
3	6	(Italy) Riccardo Patrese	Williams-Renault	65	+ 15.909	4	4
4	28	(France) Jean Alesi	Ferrari	65	+ 22.772	7	3
5	1	(Brazil) Ayrton Senna	McLaren-Honda	65	+ 1:02.402	3	2
6	19	(Germany) Michael Schumacher	Benetton-Ford	65	+ 1:19.468	5	1
7	15	(Brazil) Maurício Gugelmin	Leyton House-Ilmor	64	+ 1 lap	13	
8	22	(Finland) JJ Lehto	Dallara-Judd	64	+ 1 lap	15	
9	32	(Italy) Alessandro Zanardi	Jordan-Ford	64	+ 1 lap	20	
10	7	(United Kingdom) Martin Brundle	Brabham-Yamaha	63	+ 2 laps	11	
11	20	(Brazil) Nelson Piquet	Benetton-Ford	63	+ 2 laps	10	
12	14	(Italy) Gabriele Tarquini	Fondmetal-Ford	63	+ 2 laps	22	
13	23	(Italy) Pierluigi Martini	Minardi-Ferrari	63	+ 2 laps	19	
14	24	(Italy) Gianni Morbidelli	Minardi-Ferrari	62	Collision	16	
15	21	(Italy) Emanuele Pirro	Dallara-Judd	62	+ 3 laps	9	
16	4	(Italy) Stefano Modena	Tyrrell-Honda	62	+ 3 laps	14	
17	3	(Japan) Satoru Nakajima	Tyrrell-Honda	62	+ 3 laps	18	
Ret	8	(United Kingdom) Mark Blundell	Brabham-Yamaha	49	Engine	12	
Ret	26	(France) Érik Comas	Ligier-Lamborghini	36	Electrical	25	
Ret	2	(Austria) Gerhard Berger	McLaren-Honda	33	Electrical	1	
Ret	9	(Italy) Michele Alboreto	Footwork-Ford	23	Engine	24	
Ret	33	(Italy) Andrea de Cesaris	Jordan-Ford	22	Electrical	17	
Ret	11	(Finland) Mika Häkkinen	Lotus-Judd	5	Spun off	21	
Ret	16	(Italy) Ivan Capelli	Leyton House-Ilmor	1	Collision	8	
Ret	29	(France) Éric Bernard	Lola-Ford	0	Collision	23	
Ret	25	(Belgium) Thierry Boutsen	Ligier-Lamborghini	0	Collision	26	
DNQ	30	(Japan) Aguri Suzuki	Lola-Ford				
DNQ	34	(Italy) Nicola Larini	Lambo-Lamborghini				
DNQ	12	(Germany) Michael Bartels	Lotus-Judd				
DNQ	35	(Belgium) Eric van de Poele	Lambo-Lamborghini				
DNPQ	10	(Italy) Alex Caffi	Footwork-Ford				
DNPQ	18	(Italy) Fabrizio Barbazza	AGS-Ford				
DNPQ	17	(France) Olivier Grouillard	AGS-Ford				

== Championship standings after the race ==
Drivers' Championship standings

	Pos	Driver	Points
	1	(Brazil) **Ayrton Senna***	85
	2	(United Kingdom) **Nigel Mansell***	69
	3	(Italy) Riccardo Patrese	48
2	4	(France) Alain Prost	31
1	5	(Austria) Gerhard Berger	31

Constructors' Championship standings

	Pos	Constructor	Points
1	1	(United Kingdom) **Williams-Renault***	117
1	2	(United Kingdom) **McLaren-Honda***	116
	3	(Italy) Ferrari	52
	4	(United Kingdom) Benetton-Ford	37
	5	(Republic of Ireland) Jordan-Ford	13

- Note: Only the top five positions are included for both sets of standings.
- Competitors in bold and marked with an asterisk still had a mathematical chance of becoming World Champion.

Previous race: 1991 Portuguese Grand Prix	FIA Formula One World Championship; 1991 season	Next race: 1991 Japanese Grand Prix
Previous race: 1990 Spanish Grand Prix	Spanish Grand Prix	Next race: 1992 Spanish Grand Prix
