= 1991 Portuguese Grand Prix =

- Race 13 of 16 in the 1991 Formula One World Championship
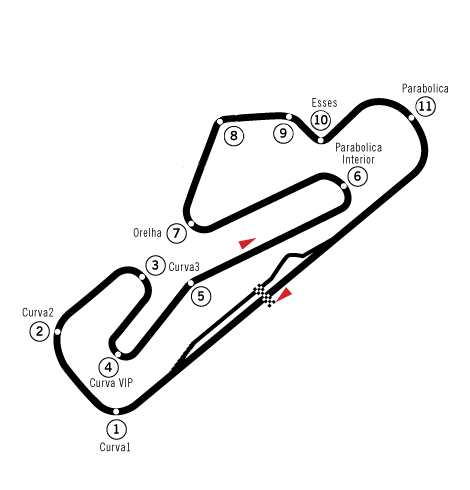

Race details
- Date: 22 September 1991
- Official name: XXIII Grande Premio de Portugal
- Location: Autódromo do Estoril
- Course: Permanent racing facility
- Course length: 4.350 km (2.703 miles)
- Distance: 71 laps, 308.850 km (191.910 miles)
- Weather: Sunny and warm

Pole position
Driver	(Italy) Riccardo Patrese	Williams-Renault
- Time: 1:13.001

Fastest lap
Driver	(United Kingdom) Nigel Mansell	Williams-Renault
- Time: 1:18.179 on lap 43

Podium
First	(Italy) Riccardo Patrese	Williams-Renault
Second	(Brazil) Ayrton Senna	McLaren-Honda
Third	(France) Jean Alesi	Ferrari

The 1991 Portuguese Grand Prix was a Formula One motor race held at the Autódromo do Estoril on 22 September 1991. It was the thirteenth race of the 1991 Formula One World Championship.

The 71-lap race was won by Italian driver Riccardo Patrese, driving a Williams-Renault, after he started from pole position. Patrese's teammate and Drivers' Championship challenger, Briton Nigel Mansell, led until a pit stop went wrong, resulting in his disqualification from the race. Brazilian Ayrton Senna finished second in a McLaren-Honda, thus increasing his lead over Mansell in the championship to 24 points with three races remaining, with Frenchman Jean Alesi finishing third in a Ferrari.

== Pre-race ==
The only change to the driver line-up was that Johnny Herbert was back at Lotus, replacing Michael Bartels, who had failed to qualify in his three outings for the team.

== Qualifying ==
=== Pre-qualifying report ===
It was the fourth consecutive 1–2 for the Brabham team in Friday morning pre-qualifying, with Martin Brundle outpacing his team-mate Mark Blundell by just 0.049 of a second. Third was Gabriele Tarquini in the AGS, just under three tenths of a second off the pace in the new JH27. The Footwork of Michele Alboreto was fourth, the Italian's fourth pre-qualifying success in five attempts.

The four drivers to miss out included Tarquini's team-mate Fabrizio Barbazza in fifth position, although he was closer to the pace than in previous events, driving the new AGS JH27 for the first time. Olivier Grouillard could only manage sixth place on this occasion for Fondmetal, his eighth pre-qualifying failure this season, and the Frenchman was sacked by the team after the Grand Prix weekend. Alex Caffi struggled again in the other Footwork in seventh place, his fourth failure in five pre-qualifying attempts, in contrast with his team-mate Alboreto. At the bottom of the time sheets, Pedro Chaves was unable to post a representative time at his home event in the Coloni, but the team announced it had been purchased by Italian shoe designer Andrea Sassetti.

=== Pre-qualifying classification ===
Pos	No	Driver	Constructor	Time	Gap
1	7	(United Kingdom) Martin Brundle	Brabham-Yamaha	1:17.739	—
2	8	(United Kingdom) Mark Blundell	Brabham-Yamaha	1:17.788	+0.049
3	17	(Italy) Gabriele Tarquini	AGS-Ford	1:18.020	+0.281
4	9	(Italy) Michele Alboreto	Footwork-Ford	1:18.371	+0.583
5	18	(Italy) Fabrizio Barbazza	AGS-Ford	1:19.292	+1.553
6	14	(France) Olivier Grouillard	Fondmetal-Ford	1:19.500	+1.761
7	10	(Italy) Alex Caffi	Footwork-Ford	1:19.521	+1.782
8	31	(Portugal) Pedro Chaves	Coloni-Ford	1:23.858	+6.119

=== Qualifying report ===
Qualifying saw the top teams' second drivers beating the championship contenders. Riccardo Patrese took pole ahead of Gerhard Berger, with Ayrton Senna and Nigel Mansell third and fourth respectively. The top ten was rounded out by Alain Prost, Jean Alesi, Maurício Gugelmin, Pierluigi Martini, Ivan Capelli, and Michael Schumacher, the Benetton team a little off their usual pace.

=== Qualifying classification ===
Pos	No	Driver	Constructor	Q1	Q2	Gap
1	6	(Italy) Riccardo Patrese	Williams-Renault	1:14.041	1:13.001	—
2	2	(Austria) Gerhard Berger	McLaren-Honda	1:13.221	1:13.430	+0.220
3	1	(Brazil) Ayrton Senna	McLaren-Honda	1:13.752	1:13.444	+0.443
4	5	(United Kingdom) Nigel Mansell	Williams-Renault	1:13.944	1:13.667	+0.666
5	27	(France) Alain Prost	Ferrari	1:15.018	1:14.352	+1.351
6	28	(France) Jean Alesi	Ferrari	1:15.572	1:14.852	+1.851
7	15	(Brazil) Maurício Gugelmin	Leyton House-Ilmor	1:17.214	1:15.266	+2.265
8	23	(Italy) Pierluigi Martini	Minardi-Ferrari	1:15.394	1:16.982	+2.393
9	16	(Italy) Ivan Capelli	Leyton House-Ilmor	1:15.481	1:15.827	+2.480
10	19	(Germany) Michael Schumacher	Benetton-Ford	1:16.477	1:15.578	+2.577
11	20	(Brazil) Nelson Piquet	Benetton-Ford	1:16.241	1:15.666	+2.665
12	4	(Italy) Stefano Modena	Tyrrell-Honda	1:16.018	1:15.707	+2.706
13	24	(Italy) Gianni Morbidelli	Minardi-Ferrari	1:16.540	1:15.749	+2.748
14	33	(Italy) Andrea de Cesaris	Jordan-Ford	1:15.972	1:15.936	+2.935
15	8	(United Kingdom) Mark Blundell	Brabham-Yamaha	1:16.567	1:16.038	+3.037
16	32	(Brazil) Roberto Moreno	Jordan-Ford	1:16.956	1:16.080	+3.079
17	21	(Italy) Emanuele Pirro	Dallara-Judd	1:16.725	1:16.135	+3.134
18	22	(Finland) JJ Lehto	Dallara-Judd	1:16.724	1:16.532	+3.531
19	7	(United Kingdom) Martin Brundle	Brabham-Yamaha	1:17.298	1:16.536	+3.535
20	25	(Belgium) Thierry Boutsen	Ligier-Lamborghini	1:18.005	1:16.757	+3.756
21	3	(Japan) Satoru Nakajima	Tyrrell-Honda	1:16.926	1:17.035	+3.925
22	12	(United Kingdom) Johnny Herbert	Lotus-Judd	1:17.713	1:17.015	+4.014
23	26	(France) Érik Comas	Ligier-Lamborghini	1:18.192	1:17.226	+4.225
24	9	(Italy) Michele Alboreto	Footwork-Ford	1:18.389	1:17.330	+4.329
25	30	(Japan) Aguri Suzuki	Lola-Ford	1:17.434	1:17.537	+4.433
26	11	(Finland) Mika Häkkinen	Lotus-Judd	1:18.947	1:17.714	+4.713
27	29	(France) Éric Bernard	Lola-Ford	1:18.186	1:17.825	+4.824
28	17	(Italy) Gabriele Tarquini	AGS-Ford	1:18.295	1:18.022	+5.021
29	34	(Italy) Nicola Larini	Lambo-Lamborghini	1:21.612	1:18.139	+5.138
30	35	(Belgium) Eric van de Poele	Lambo-Lamborghini	1:20.411	1:18.266	+5.265

== Race ==
=== Race report ===
On Sunday Morning Prost's Ferrari had a rather dramatic blowup in the warmup, and the Frenchman had to start the race in the spare car. The start was very eventful with Patrese getting away well and with Mansell aggressively chopping across the front of Senna. Unimpressed, he tried to retake Mansell going into the first turn but Nigel held his line and then proceeded to sweep underneath Berger to grab second at the second corner. After lap 1 the order was Patrese, Mansell, Berger, Senna, and Alesi. Mansell seemed content to shadow Patrese until lap 18 when he slipstreamed past his teammate on the main straight and proceeded to pull away. Things were looking good for Williams until Mansell came in for his stop on lap 29 and disaster struck: a communications mix-up by the pit crew resulted in Mansell being sent off with the right rear wheel of his car not properly attached. The wheel rotated clean off and a frustrated Mansell was left stranded in the pit lane. In the heat of the moment, the crew scampered over to the car and fitted a fresh wheel outside of the pit box, a violation of the rules.

Mansell emerged in 17th place and started a charge through the field; he was up to sixth when he was finally shown the black disqualification flag on lap 51. He would, however, keep the fastest lap of the race, set on lap 43. The incident left Patrese comfortably in the lead from Berger and Senna, and Senna went second when Berger's engine blew on lap 37, he was followed out of the race by Prost's Ferrari, which also decided it had enough. On lap 40 the order was Patrese, Senna, Alesi, Martini, and Capelli, with the latter three being involved in an exciting battle for third place; Alesi didn't make errors despite being under pressure from the Minardi, and so the order remained unchanged until the late stages when the fifth placed Capelli suffered a front wing problem and ended up in the barriers, he came in the pits for a front wing change but retired only a lap later. Patrese cruised home to his second win of the season and fifth of his career. Senna was second and tightened the screw on his third drivers title. Alesi, Martini, Piquet, and Schumacher rounded out the top six. With three races to go Senna led Mansell by 24 points.

=== Race classification ===
Pos	No	Driver	Constructor	Laps	Time/Retired	Grid	Points
1	6	(Italy) Riccardo Patrese	Williams-Renault	71	1:35:42.304	1	10
2	1	(Brazil) Ayrton Senna	McLaren-Honda	71	+ 20.941	3	6
3	28	(France) Jean Alesi	Ferrari	71	+ 53.554	6	4
4	23	(Italy) Pierluigi Martini	Minardi-Ferrari	71	+ 1:03.498	8	3
5	20	(Brazil) Nelson Piquet	Benetton-Ford	71	+ 1:10.033	11	2
6	19	(Germany) Michael Schumacher	Benetton-Ford	71	+ 1:16.582	10	1
7	15	(Brazil) Maurício Gugelmin	Leyton House-Ilmor	70	+ 1 lap	7	
8	33	(Italy) Andrea de Cesaris	Jordan-Ford	70	+ 1 lap	14	
9	24	(Italy) Gianni Morbidelli	Minardi-Ferrari	70	+ 1 lap	13	
10	32	(Brazil) Roberto Moreno	Jordan-Ford	70	+ 1 lap	16	
11	26	(France) Érik Comas	Ligier-Lamborghini	70	+ 1 lap	23	
12	7	(United Kingdom) Martin Brundle	Brabham-Yamaha	69	+ 2 laps	19	
13	3	(Japan) Satoru Nakajima	Tyrrell-Honda	68	+ 3 laps	21	
14	11	(Finland) Mika Häkkinen	Lotus-Judd	68	+ 3 laps	26	
15	9	(Italy) Michele Alboreto	Footwork-Ford	68	+ 3 laps	24	
16	25	(Belgium) Thierry Boutsen	Ligier-Lamborghini	68	+ 3 laps	20	
17	16	(Italy) Ivan Capelli	Leyton House-Ilmor	64	Front wing	9	
Ret	4	(Italy) Stefano Modena	Tyrrell-Honda	56	Engine	12	
DSQ	5	(United Kingdom) Nigel Mansell	Williams-Renault	51	Illegal pit stop	4	
Ret	30	(Japan) Aguri Suzuki	Lola-Ford	40	Transmission	25	
Ret	27	(France) Alain Prost	Ferrari	39	Engine	5	
Ret	2	(Austria) Gerhard Berger	McLaren-Honda	37	Engine	2	
Ret	21	(Italy) Emanuele Pirro	Dallara-Judd	18	Engine	17	
Ret	22	(Finland) JJ Lehto	Dallara-Judd	14	Gearbox	18	
Ret	8	(United Kingdom) Mark Blundell	Brabham-Yamaha	12	Suspension	15	
Ret	12	(United Kingdom) Johnny Herbert	Lotus-Judd	1	Engine	22	
DNQ	29	(France) Éric Bernard	Lola-Ford				
DNQ	17	(Italy) Gabriele Tarquini	AGS-Ford				
DNQ	34	(Italy) Nicola Larini	Lambo-Lamborghini				
DNQ	35	(Belgium) Eric van de Poele	Lambo-Lamborghini				
DNPQ	18	(Italy) Fabrizio Barbazza	AGS-Ford				
DNPQ	14	(France) Olivier Grouillard	Fondmetal-Ford				
DNPQ	10	(Italy) Alex Caffi	Footwork-Ford				
DNPQ	31	(Portugal) Pedro Chaves	Coloni-Ford				

== Championship standings after the race ==
Drivers' Championship standings

	Pos	Driver	Points
	1	(Brazil) **Ayrton Senna***	83
	2	(United Kingdom) **Nigel Mansell***	59
	3	(Italy) Riccardo Patrese	44
	4	(Austria) Gerhard Berger	31
1	5	(Brazil) Nelson Piquet	25

Constructors' Championship standings

Pos	Constructor	Points
1	(United Kingdom) **McLaren-Honda***	114
2	(United Kingdom) **Williams-Renault***	103
3	(Italy) Ferrari	43
4	(United Kingdom) Benetton-Ford	36
5	(Republic of Ireland) Jordan-Ford	13

- Note: Only the top five positions are included for both sets of standings.
- Competitors in bold and marked with an asterisk still had a mathematical chance of becoming World Champion.

Previous race: 1991 Italian Grand Prix	FIA Formula One World Championship; 1991 season	Next race: 1991 Spanish Grand Prix
Previous race: 1990 Portuguese Grand Prix	Portuguese Grand Prix	Next race: 1992 Portuguese Grand Prix
