= 1991 Italian Grand Prix =

- Race 12 of 16 in the 1991 Formula One World Championship
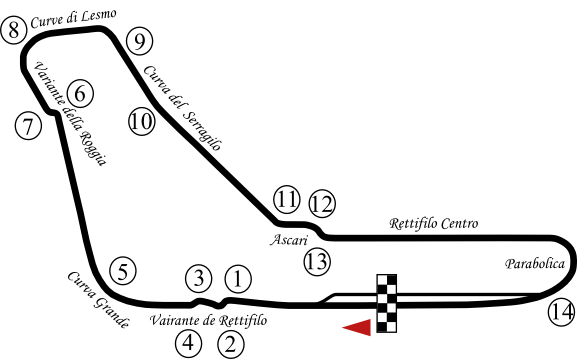

Race details
- Date: 8 September 1991
- Official name: Coca-Cola 62º Gran Premio d'Italia
- Location: Autodromo Nazionale di Monza; Monza, Lombardy, Italy
- Course: Permanent racing facility
- Course length: 5.800 km (3.604 miles)
- Distance: 53 laps, 307.400 km (191.01 miles)
- Weather: Sunny and warm

Pole position
Driver	(Brazil) Ayrton Senna	McLaren-Honda
- Time: 1:21.114

Fastest lap
Driver	(Brazil) Ayrton Senna	McLaren-Honda
- Time: 1:26.061 on lap 41

Podium
First	(United Kingdom) Nigel Mansell	Williams-Renault
Second	(Brazil) Ayrton Senna	McLaren-Honda
Third	(France) Alain Prost	Ferrari

The 1991 Italian Grand Prix (formally the Coca-Cola 62º Gran Premio d'Italia) was a Formula One motor race held at Monza on 8 September 1991. It was the twelfth race of the 1991 Formula One World Championship.

The 53-lap race was won by British driver Nigel Mansell, driving a Williams-Renault, after he started from second position. Drivers' Championship leader, Brazilian Ayrton Senna, finished second in his McLaren-Honda, having started from pole position, with Frenchman Alain Prost third in a Ferrari. The win, Mansell's fourth of the season, enabled him to reduce Senna's championship lead to 18 points with four races remaining.

== Pre-race ==
The big news between the Belgian and Italian Grands Prix revolved around young Michael Schumacher, who had made his debut for Jordan in Belgium. Schumacher had signed for Benetton while still being under contract to Jordan. After much legal wrangling the German was confirmed at Benetton, while Roberto Moreno went the other way, taking Schumacher's place at Jordan. Elsewhere Michael Bartels was back at Lotus, as Johnny Herbert had more commitments in Japanese Formula 3000.

== Qualifying ==
=== Pre-qualifying report ===
It was a third 1–2 in a row for Brabham in the Friday morning pre-qualifying session, with Mark Blundell back on top of the time sheets, eight tenths of a second faster than Martin Brundle. Olivier Grouillard was again third fastest for Fondmetal, his fifth pre-qualifying success of the season. Michele Alboreto took the last pre-qualification position in the Footwork, 1.5 seconds off Blundell's pace.

In his best pre-qualifying performance in his four attempts so far, Fabrizio Barbazza just missed out in fifth place in the AGS, albeit 1.6 seconds slower than Alboreto. His team-mate Gabriele Tarquini debuted the new JH27 car, but its engine failed on the first lap. Tarquini reverted to the JH25B, but could only manage sixth fastest. Alex Caffi was a couple of tenths of a second further back in seventh in the other Footwork, while Pedro Chaves remained stuck in the pits after the worn engine in his Coloni refused to start.

=== Pre-qualifying classification ===
Pos	No	Driver	Constructor	Time	Gap
1	8	(United Kingdom) Mark Blundell	Brabham-Yamaha	1:24.271	
2	7	(United Kingdom) Martin Brundle	Brabham-Yamaha	1:25.117	+0.846
3	14	(France) Olivier Grouillard	Fondmetal-Ford	1:25.556	+1.285
4	9	(Italy) Michele Alboreto	Footwork-Ford	1:25.771	+1.500
5	18	(Italy) Fabrizio Barbazza	AGS-Ford	1:27.392	+3.121
6	17	(Italy) Gabriele Tarquini	AGS-Ford	1:27.401	+3.130
7	10	(Italy) Alex Caffi	Footwork-Ford	1:27.608	+3.337
8	31	(Portugal) Pedro Chaves	Coloni-Ford	—	—

=== Qualifying report ===
In qualifying, Ayrton Senna took pole again, with title rival Nigel Mansell second, the Englishman complaining of traffic on his final two hot laps. Gerhard Berger was third, followed by Riccardo Patrese, Alain Prost, Jean Alesi, Schumacher, Nelson Piquet, in his 200th Grand Prix, Moreno, and Pierluigi Martini, in the Ferrari powered Minardi.

=== Qualifying classification ===
Pos	No	Driver	Constructor	Q1	Q2	Gap
1	1	(Brazil) Ayrton Senna	McLaren-Honda	1:21.114	1:21.245	
2	5	(United Kingdom) Nigel Mansell	Williams-Renault	1:21.328	1:21.247	+0.133
3	2	(Austria) Gerhard Berger	McLaren-Honda	1:21.360	1:21.346	+0.232
4	6	(Italy) Riccardo Patrese	Williams-Renault	1:21.619	1:21.372	+0.258
5	27	(France) Alain Prost	Ferrari	1:22.080	1:21.825	+0.711
6	28	(France) Jean Alesi	Ferrari	1:21.956	1:21.890	+0.776
7	19	(Germany) Michael Schumacher	Benetton-Ford	1:22.471	1:22.553	+1.357
8	20	(Brazil) Nelson Piquet	Benetton-Ford	1:23.176	1:22.726	+1.612
9	32	(Brazil) Roberto Moreno	Jordan-Ford	1:23.102	1:23.447	+1.988
10	23	(Italy) Pierluigi Martini	Minardi-Ferrari	1:23.294	1:23.789	+2.180
11	8	(United Kingdom) Mark Blundell	Brabham-Yamaha	1:23.473	1:24.400	+2.359
12	16	(Italy) Ivan Capelli	Leyton House-Ilmor	1:23.674	1:24.755	+2.560
13	4	(Italy) Stefano Modena	Tyrrell-Honda	1:24.457	1:23.701	+2.587
14	33	(Italy) Andrea de Cesaris	Jordan-Ford	1:24.060	1:23.921	+2.807
15	3	(Japan) Satoru Nakajima	Tyrrell-Honda	1:24.464	1:24.265	+3.151
16	21	(Italy) Emanuele Pirro	Dallara-Judd	1:24.584	1:24.282	+3.168
17	24	(Italy) Gianni Morbidelli	Minardi-Ferrari	1:24.287	1:25.223	+3.173
18	15	(Brazil) Maurício Gugelmin	Leyton House-Ilmor	1:24.391	1:25.023	+3.277
19	7	(United Kingdom) Martin Brundle	Brabham-Yamaha	1:24.713	1:24.643	+3.529
20	22	(Finland) JJ Lehto	Dallara-Judd	1:24.733	1:24.725	+3.611
21	25	(Belgium) Thierry Boutsen	Ligier-Lamborghini	1:26.133	1:25.177	+4.063
22	26	(France) Érik Comas	Ligier-Lamborghini	1:25.478	1:25.420	+4.306
23	34	(Italy) Nicola Larini	Lambo-Lamborghini	1:25.717	1:25.934	+4.603
24	29	(France) Éric Bernard	Lola-Ford	1:26.325	1:25.871	+4.757
25	11	(Finland) Mika Häkkinen	Lotus-Judd	1:26.701	1:25.941	+4.827
26	14	(France) Olivier Grouillard	Fondmetal-Ford	1:26.416	1:26.805	+5.302
27	9	(Italy) Michele Alboreto	Footwork-Ford	1:26.563	1:27.198	+5.449
28	12	(Germany) Michael Bartels	Lotus-Judd	1:27.169	1:26.829	+5.715
29	35	(Belgium) Eric van de Poele	Lambo-Lamborghini	1:27.110	1:27.099	+5.985
30	30	(Japan) Aguri Suzuki	Lola-Ford	1:27.257	18:14.470	+6.143

== Race ==
=== Race report ===
At the start Senna got away well from Mansell, Berger, Patrese, and Alesi, with everyone making it through the Rettifilo double chicane. Moreno was an early casualty as he spun off on lap 2 with the Jordan's suspension breaking just before the spin also just behind the leaders.

Patrese at the front started to charge, first he disposed of Berger, and then Mansell. Martini had spun off in the Minardi by lap 8 at Roggia behind the leaders. On lap 26 Patrese passed Senna at the Ascari chicane, but on the following lap a gearbox failure took him out. Senna now led from Mansell and Berger, with Mansell pressuring Senna for the lead, and on lap 34 he took it with a perfectly timed out-braking manoeuvre going into the Ascari chicane. Senna proceeded to pit for tyres and emerged down in fifth place, but in no mood to stay there. Senna proceeded to pass Schumacher going into Ascari, and then slipstreamed passed Berger into the first corner, and got back to second by passing arch-rival Prost going into the second chicane. Mansell meanwhile cruised to victory from Senna, Prost, Berger (despite pulling off just after the start/finish line with electrical problems), Schumacher, and Piquet, Alesi having retired with a blown engine. With four races to go Senna still led Mansell by 18 points, but this race confirmed that Mansell and Williams could beat Senna's McLaren in a straight fight.

=== Race classification ===
Pos	No	Driver	Constructor	Laps	Time/Retired	Grid	Points
1	5	(United Kingdom) Nigel Mansell	Williams-Renault	53	1:17:54.319	2	10
2	1	(Brazil) Ayrton Senna	McLaren-Honda	53	+ 16.262	1	6
3	27	(France) Alain Prost	Ferrari	53	+ 16.829	5	4
4	2	(Austria) Gerhard Berger	McLaren-Honda	53	+ 27.719	3	3
5	19	(Germany) Michael Schumacher	Benetton-Ford	53	+ 34.463	7	2
6	20	(Brazil) Nelson Piquet	Benetton-Ford	53	+ 45.600	8	1
7	33	(Italy) Andrea de Cesaris	Jordan-Ford	53	+ 51.136	14	
8	16	(Italy) Ivan Capelli	Leyton House-Ilmor	53	+ 1:15.019	12	
9	24	(Italy) Gianni Morbidelli	Minardi-Ferrari	52	+ 1 lap	17	
10	21	(Italy) Emanuele Pirro	Dallara-Judd	52	+ 1 lap	16	
11	26	(France) Érik Comas	Ligier-Lamborghini	52	+ 1 lap	22	
12	8	(United Kingdom) Mark Blundell	Brabham-Yamaha	52	+ 1 lap	11	
13	7	(United Kingdom) Martin Brundle	Brabham-Yamaha	52	+ 1 lap	19	
14	11	(Finland) Mika Häkkinen	Lotus-Judd	49	+ 4 laps	25	
15	15	(Brazil) Maurício Gugelmin	Leyton House-Ilmor	49	+ 4 laps	18	
16	34	(Italy) Nicola Larini	Lambo-Lamborghini	48	+ 5 laps	23	
Ret	14	(France) Olivier Grouillard	Fondmetal-Ford	46	Engine	26	
Ret	22	(Finland) JJ Lehto	Dallara-Judd	35	Overheating	20	
Ret	4	(Italy) Stefano Modena	Tyrrell-Honda	32	Engine	13	
Ret	28	(France) Jean Alesi	Ferrari	29	Engine	6	
Ret	6	(Italy) Riccardo Patrese	Williams-Renault	27	Gearbox	4	
Ret	3	(Japan) Satoru Nakajima	Tyrrell-Honda	24	Throttle	15	
Ret	29	(France) Éric Bernard	Lola-Ford	21	Engine	24	
Ret	23	(Italy) Pierluigi Martini	Minardi-Ferrari	8	Spun off	10	
Ret	32	(Brazil) Roberto Moreno	Jordan-Ford	2	Spun off	9	
Ret	25	(Belgium) Thierry Boutsen	Ligier-Lamborghini	1	Spun off	21	
DNQ	9	(Italy) Michele Alboreto	Footwork-Ford				
DNQ	12	(Germany) Michael Bartels	Lotus-Judd				
DNQ	35	(Belgium) Eric van de Poele	Lambo-Lamborghini				
DNQ	30	(Japan) Aguri Suzuki	Lola-Ford				
DNPQ	18	(Italy) Fabrizio Barbazza	AGS-Ford				
DNPQ	17	(Italy) Gabriele Tarquini	AGS-Ford				
DNPQ	10	(Italy) Alex Caffi	Footwork-Ford				
DNPQ	31	(Portugal) Pedro Chaves	Coloni-Ford				

== Championship standings after the race ==
Drivers' Championship standings

	Pos	Driver	Points
	1	(Brazil) **Ayrton Senna***	77
	2	(United Kingdom) **Nigel Mansell***	59
	3	(Italy) Riccardo Patrese	34
	4	(Austria) Gerhard Berger	31
1	5	(France) Alain Prost	25

Constructors' Championship standings

Pos	Constructor	Points
1	(United Kingdom) **McLaren-Honda***	108
2	(United Kingdom) **Williams-Renault***	93
3	(Italy) Ferrari	39
4	(United Kingdom) Benetton-Ford	33
5	(Republic of Ireland) Jordan-Ford	13

- Note: Only the top five positions are included for both sets of standings.
- Competitors in bold and marked with an asterisk still had a mathematical chance of becoming World Champion.

Previous race: 1991 Belgian Grand Prix	FIA Formula One World Championship; 1991 season	Next race: 1991 Portuguese Grand Prix
Previous race: 1990 Italian Grand Prix	Italian Grand Prix	Next race: 1992 Italian Grand Prix
