= 1991 Mexican Grand Prix =

- Race 6 of 16 in the 1991 Formula One World Championship

Race details
- Date: 16 June 1991
- Location: Autódromo Hermanos Rodríguez; Mexico City, Mexico
- Course: Permanent racing facility
- Course length: 4.421 km (2.747 miles)
- Distance: 67 laps, 296.207 km (184.049 miles)
- Scheduled distance: 69 laps, 305.049 km (189.549 miles)
- Weather: Mostly Cloudy; 24 °C (75 °F)

Pole position
Driver	(Italy) Riccardo Patrese	Williams-Renault
- Time: 1:16.696

Fastest lap
Driver	(United Kingdom) Nigel Mansell	Williams-Renault
- Time: 1:16.788 on lap 61 (lap record)

Podium
First	(Italy) Riccardo Patrese	Williams-Renault
Second	(United Kingdom) Nigel Mansell	Williams-Renault
Third	(Brazil) Ayrton Senna	McLaren-Honda

The 1991 Mexican Grand Prix was a Formula One motor race held at the Autódromo Hermanos Rodríguez, Mexico City, on 16 June 1991. It was the sixth race of the 1991 Formula One World Championship.

The 67-lap race was won by Italian Riccardo Patrese, driving a Williams-Renault, after he started from pole position. Patrese's teammate, Briton Nigel Mansell, finished second, with Brazilian Ayrton Senna third in a McLaren-Honda.

As of 2026, it was the most recent Formula One race to feature a car powered by a Porsche engine.

== Pre-race ==
In the run-up to the race, Tyrrell had lost talented designer Harvey Postlethwaite to the Mercedes-Benz sportscar team, while Ayrton Senna had been injured in a jet-ski incident. During Friday qualifying, Senna suffered a big accident at the high-speed Peraltada bend, in which his McLaren rolled and landed upside-down, but he emerged unscathed.

== Qualifying ==
=== Pre-qualifying report ===
In the Friday morning pre-qualifying session, JJ Lehto was fastest for Scuderia Italia for the third time this season. His Dallara was over half a second faster than the second-placed runner, Fondmetal's Olivier Grouillard. It was the first time this season that Grouillard had pre-qualified and progressed to the main qualifying sessions. Initially, the third fastest driver was Nicola Larini in the Modena Lambo, but he was later excluded when his rear wing was found to be too high. This promoted the two Jordans one position each, with Andrea de Cesaris taking third, a second faster than Bertrand Gachot in fourth.

Missing out in fifth place was Eric van de Poele in the other Lambo, just 0.056 of a second behind Gachot. Over six seconds behind van de Poele was Pedro Chaves in the Coloni, with the team suffering from financial problems. Emanuele Pirro was seventh in the other Dallara, having not posted a representative lap time.

=== Pre-qualifying classification ===
Pos	No	Driver	Constructor	Time	Gap
1	22	(Finland) JJ Lehto	Dallara-Judd	1:28.381	—
2	14	(France) Olivier Grouillard	Fondmetal-Ford	1:28.959	+0.578
3	33	(Italy) Andrea de Cesaris	Jordan-Ford	1:29.545	+1.164
4	32	(Belgium) Bertrand Gachot	Jordan-Ford	1:30.599	+2.218
5	35	(Belgium) Eric van de Poele	Lambo-Lamborghini	1:30.655	+2.274
6	31	(Portugal) Pedro Chaves	Coloni-Ford	1:37.144	+8.763
7	21	(Italy) Emanuele Pirro	Dallara-Judd	1:40.164	+11.783
EX	34	(Italy) Nicola Larini	Lambo-Lamborghini	—	

=== Qualifying report ===
For the second race in succession, the Williams team filled the front row with Riccardo Patrese ahead of Nigel Mansell. Senna recovered from his dramatic accident on the Friday to take third on Saturday, with Jean Alesi fourth for Ferrari. Senna's McLaren teammate Gerhard Berger was fifth ahead of Benetton's Nelson Piquet, the winner of the previous race in Canada. The top ten was completed by Alain Prost in the second Ferrari, Stefano Modena in the Tyrrell, Roberto Moreno in the second Benetton and, remarkably, Olivier Grouillard in the Fondmetal. The latter seven drivers were separated by little more than 0.3 of a second.

=== Qualifying classification ===
Pos	No	Driver	Constructor	Q1	Q2	Gap
1	6	(Italy) Riccardo Patrese	Williams-Renault	1:16.696	1:17.192	
2	5	(United Kingdom) Nigel Mansell	Williams-Renault	1:16.978	1:18.346	+0.282
3	1	(Brazil) Ayrton Senna	McLaren-Honda	1:17.264	1:18.711	+0.568
4	28	(France) Jean Alesi	Ferrari	1:18.129	1:19.581	+1.433
5	2	(Austria) Gerhard Berger	McLaren-Honda	1:18.156	1:18.980	+1.460
6	20	(Brazil) Nelson Piquet	Benetton-Ford	1:18.168	1:19.117	+1.472
7	27	(France) Alain Prost	Ferrari	1:18.183	1:20.778	+1.487
8	4	(Italy) Stefano Modena	Tyrrell-Honda	1:18.911	1:18.216	+1.520
9	19	(Brazil) Roberto Moreno	Benetton-Ford	1:18.589	1:18.375	+1.679
10	14	(France) Olivier Grouillard	Fondmetal-Ford	1:18.453	1:29.560	+1.757
11	33	(Italy) Andrea de Cesaris	Jordan-Ford	1:20.053	1:18.935	+2.239
12	8	(United Kingdom) Mark Blundell	Brabham-Yamaha	1:19.064	49:28.503	+2.368
13	3	(Japan) Satoru Nakajima	Tyrrell-Honda	1:19.971	1:19.092	+2.396
14	25	(Belgium) Thierry Boutsen	Ligier-Lamborghini	1:20.978	1:19.201	+2.505
15	23	(Italy) Pierluigi Martini	Minardi-Ferrari	1:19.215	1:19.878	+2.519
16	22	(Finland) JJ Lehto	Dallara-Judd	1:19.291	1:20.029	+2.595
17	7	(United Kingdom) Martin Brundle	Brabham-Yamaha	1:20.378	1:19.647	+2.951
18	29	(France) Éric Bernard	Lola-Ford	1:20.442	1:19.785	+3.089
19	30	(Japan) Aguri Suzuki	Lola-Ford	1:21.737	1:20.049	+3.353
20	32	(Belgium) Bertrand Gachot	Jordan-Ford	1:20.050	1:20.551	+3.354
21	15	(Brazil) Maurício Gugelmin	Leyton House-Ilmor	1:20.200	1:20.535	+3.504
22	16	(Italy) Ivan Capelli	Leyton House-Ilmor	1:20.252	1:21.053	+3.556
23	24	(Italy) Gianni Morbidelli	Minardi-Ferrari	1:21.257	1:20.322	+3.626
24	11	(Finland) Mika Häkkinen	Lotus-Judd	1:20.823	1:22.072	+4.127
25	12	(United Kingdom) Johnny Herbert	Lotus-Judd	1:20.830	1:22.964	+4.134
26	9	(Italy) Michele Alboreto	Footwork-Porsche	1:21.429	1:21.178	+4.482
27	26	(France) Érik Comas	Ligier-Lamborghini	1:21.737	1:21.225	+4.529
28	17	(Italy) Gabriele Tarquini	AGS-Ford	1:22.258	1:22.398	+5.562
29	10	(Sweden) Stefan Johansson	Footwork-Porsche	1:22.938	1:22.598	+5.902
30	18	(Italy) Fabrizio Barbazza	AGS-Ford	1:22.899	1:23.920	+6.203

== Race ==
=== Race report ===
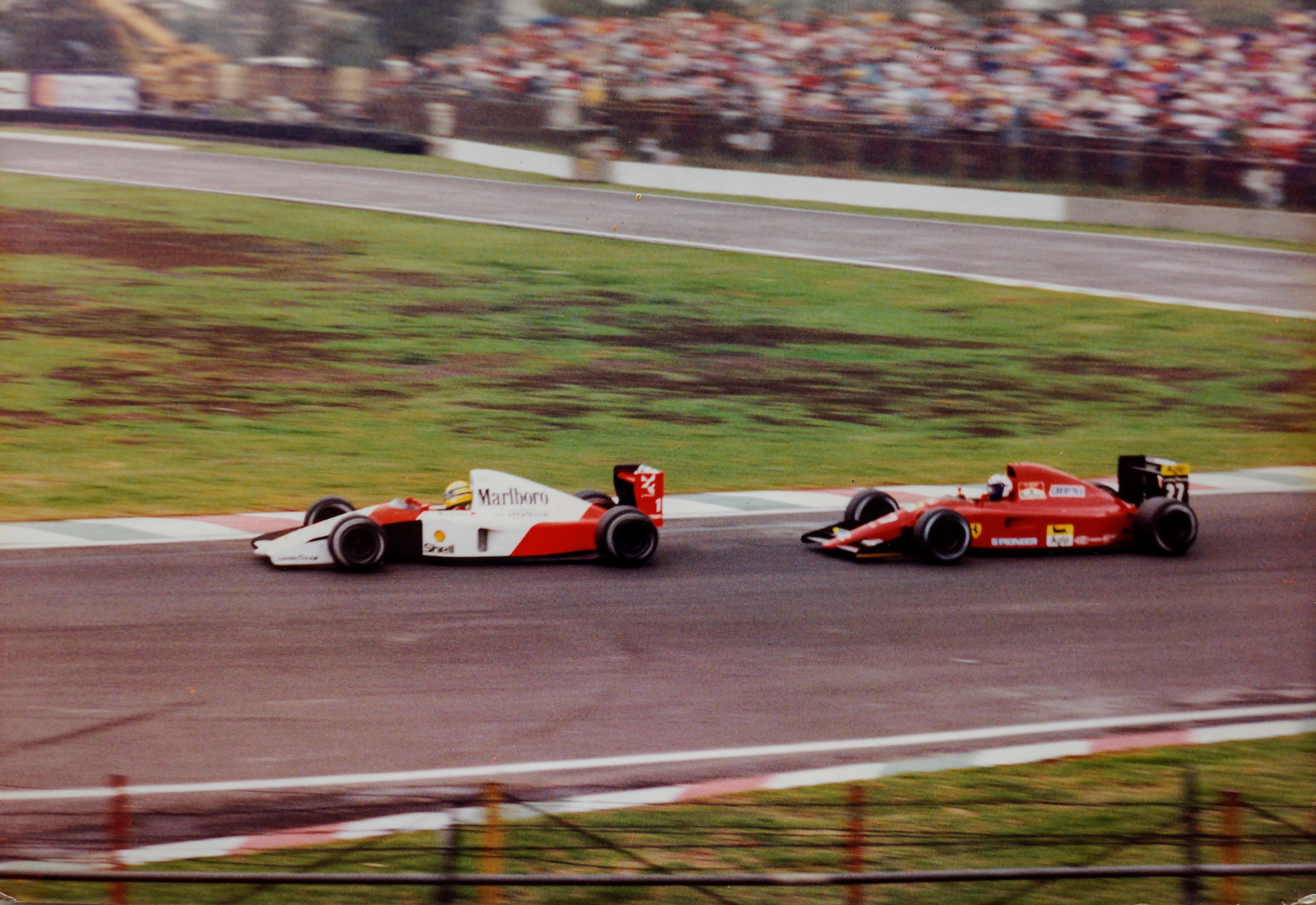
Ayrton Senna leading Alain Prost

The actual race needed three attempts to get underway: the first start was aborted when a fire marshal thought he saw a fire in the back of JJ Lehto's Dallara and jumped onto the track, while Grouillard stalled at the second start and was relegated to the back of the grid.

At the third start, Patrese made a poor getaway and dropped to fourth behind Mansell, Alesi and Senna. Senna quickly overtook Alesi, while further back, Piquet and Prost dropped behind Modena and Prost also dropped behind the fast-starting Jordan of Andrea de Cesaris. Berger, meanwhile, suffered his third consecutive early retirement when his engine exploded on lap 5, the resulting oil causing Pierluigi Martini to spin off in his Minardi. Patrese started his recovery by overtaking Alesi and then out-braking Senna into turn 1, putting him into second behind Mansell.

On lap 15, Patrese passed his team-mate, who was having engine overheating concerns, for the lead. Mansell fell back towards Senna, Piquet, de Cesaris, Moreno and Alesi (who had spun), but eventually the concerns faded and the Englishman pulled away again. Alesi passed Moreno and de Cesaris for fifth, only for his clutch to fail on lap 43, team-mate Prost having dropped out on lap 17 with an alternator failure. Piquet's race ended on lap 45 with a broken wheel bearing, and when Moreno had a pit stop go wrong, Bertrand Gachot found himself fifth in the second Jordan, before spinning off.

Patrese eventually finished 1.3 seconds ahead of Mansell, with Senna almost a minute further back. De Cesaris held on to fourth after his throttle failed on the last lap and he pushed his car over the line, the stewards deciding that he had not broken the rules by starting to push after the race had ended. Moreno recovered from his botched pit stop to take fifth, while Larrousse's Éric Bernard finished sixth, the last point scored by a chassis manufactured by Lola Cars.

=== Race classification ===
Pos	No	Driver	Constructor	Laps	Time/Retired	Grid	Points
1	6	(Italy) Riccardo Patrese	Williams-Renault	67	1:29:52.205	1	10
2	5	(United Kingdom) Nigel Mansell	Williams-Renault	67	+ 1.336	2	6
3	1	(Brazil) Ayrton Senna	McLaren-Honda	67	+ 57.356	3	4
4	33	(Italy) Andrea de Cesaris	Jordan-Ford	66	+ 1 lap	11	3
5	19	(Brazil) Roberto Moreno	Benetton-Ford	66	+ 1 lap	9	2
6	29	(France) Éric Bernard	Lola-Ford	66	+ 1 lap	18	1
7	24	(Italy) Gianni Morbidelli	Minardi-Ferrari	66	+ 1 lap	23	
8	25	(Belgium) Thierry Boutsen	Ligier-Lamborghini	65	+ 2 laps	14	
9	11	(Finland) Mika Häkkinen	Lotus-Judd	65	+ 2 laps	24	
10	12	(United Kingdom) Johnny Herbert	Lotus-Judd	65	+ 2 laps	25	
11	4	(Italy) Stefano Modena	Tyrrell-Honda	65	+ 2 laps	8	
12	3	(Japan) Satoru Nakajima	Tyrrell-Honda	64	+ 3 laps	13	
Ret	8	(United Kingdom) Mark Blundell	Brabham-Yamaha	54	Engine	12	
Ret	32	(Belgium) Bertrand Gachot	Jordan-Ford	51	Spun off	20	
Ret	30	(Japan) Aguri Suzuki	Lola-Ford	48	Gearbox	19	
Ret	20	(Brazil) Nelson Piquet	Benetton-Ford	44	Wheel bearing	6	
Ret	28	(France) Jean Alesi	Ferrari	42	Clutch	4	
Ret	22	(Finland) JJ Lehto	Dallara-Judd	30	Engine	16	
Ret	9	(Italy) Michele Alboreto	Footwork-Porsche	24	Engine	26	
Ret	7	(United Kingdom) Martin Brundle	Brabham-Yamaha	20	Wheel	17	
Ret	16	(Italy) Ivan Capelli	Leyton House-Ilmor	19	Engine	22	
Ret	27	(France) Alain Prost	Ferrari	16	Alternator	7	
Ret	15	(Brazil) Maurício Gugelmin	Leyton House-Ilmor	15	Engine	21	
Ret	14	(France) Olivier Grouillard	Fondmetal-Ford	13	Engine	10	
Ret	2	(Austria) Gerhard Berger	McLaren-Honda	5	Engine	5	
Ret	23	(Italy) Pierluigi Martini	Minardi-Ferrari	4	Spun off	15	
DNQ	26	(France) Érik Comas	Ligier-Lamborghini				
DNQ	17	(Italy) Gabriele Tarquini	AGS-Ford				
DNQ	10	(Sweden) Stefan Johansson	Footwork-Porsche				
DNQ	18	(Italy) Fabrizio Barbazza	AGS-Ford				
DNPQ	35	(Belgium) Eric van de Poele	Lambo-Lamborghini				
DNPQ	31	(Portugal) Pedro Chaves	Coloni-Ford				
DNPQ	21	(Italy) Emanuele Pirro	Dallara-Judd				
EX	34	(Italy) Nicola Larini	Lambo-Lamborghini		Rear wing infringement		

== Championship standings after the race ==
Drivers' Championship standings

	Pos	Driver	Points
	1	(Brazil) Ayrton Senna	44
2	2	(Italy) Riccardo Patrese	20
1	3	(Brazil) Nelson Piquet	16
3	4	(United Kingdom) Nigel Mansell	13
2	5	(France) Alain Prost	11

Constructors' Championship standings

	Pos	Constructor	Points
	1	(United Kingdom) McLaren-Honda	54
1	2	(United Kingdom) Williams-Renault	33
1	3	(United Kingdom) Benetton-Ford	21
	4	(Italy) Ferrari	16
	5	(United Kingdom) Tyrrell-Honda	11

- Note: Only the top five positions are included for both sets of standings.

Previous race: 1991 Canadian Grand Prix	FIA Formula One World Championship; 1991 season	Next race: 1991 French Grand Prix
Previous race: 1990 Mexican Grand Prix	Mexican Grand Prix	Next race: 1992 Mexican Grand Prix
