= 1991 Formula One World Championship =

45th season of FIA Formula One motor racing

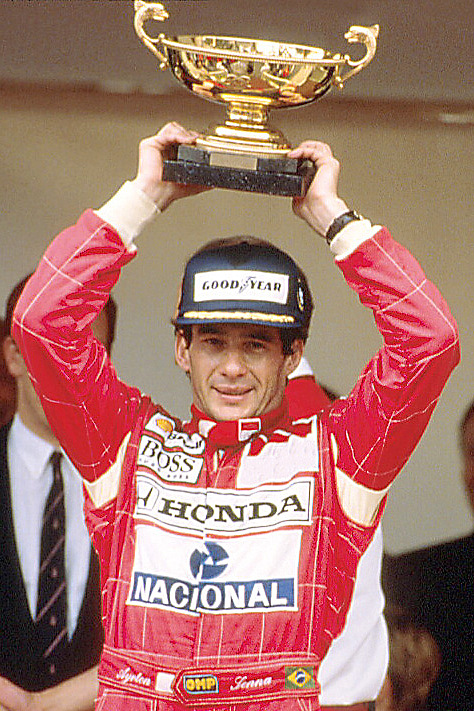
Defending champion Ayrton Senna (pictured in 1992) won his third and final title with McLaren.

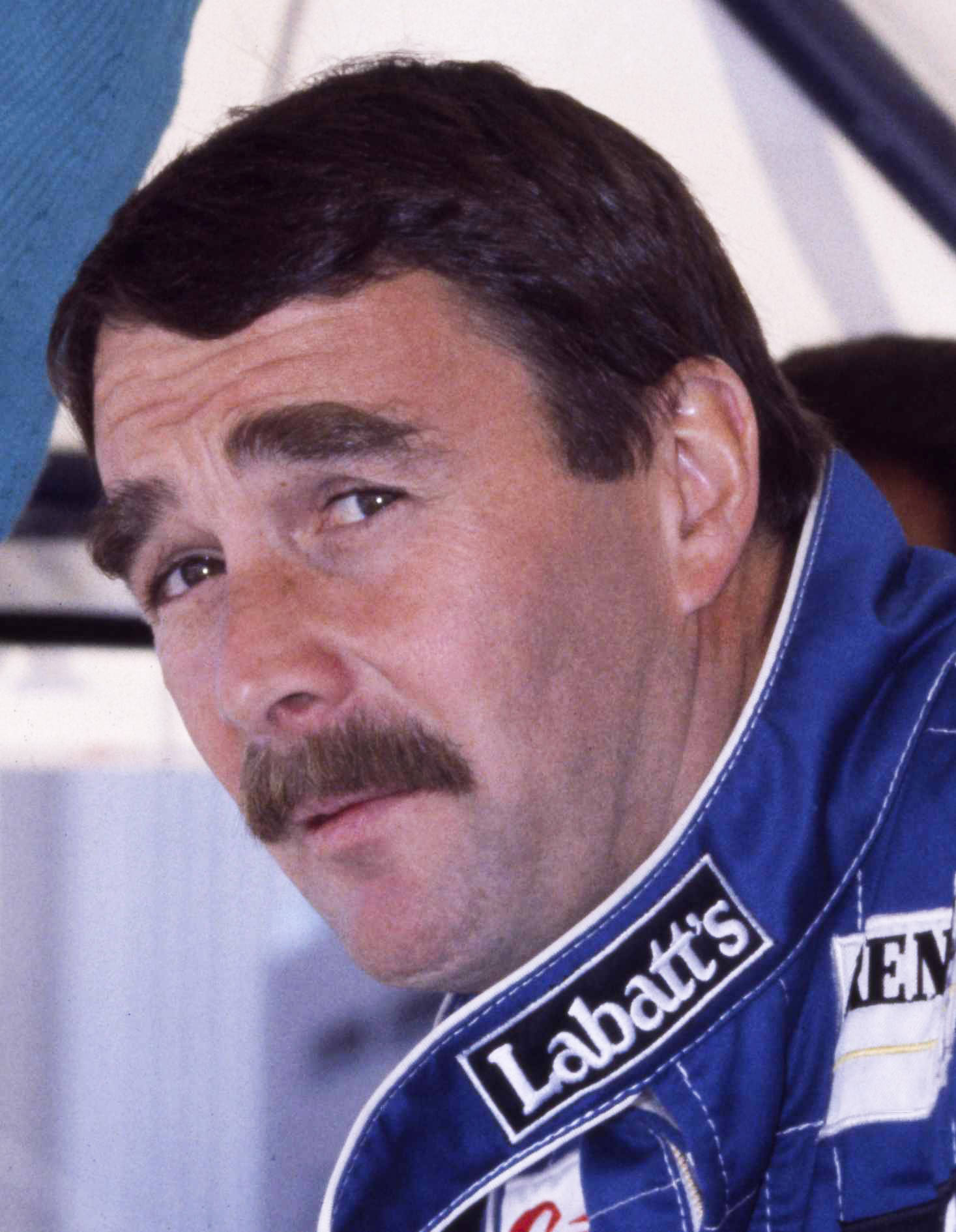
Nigel Mansell finished as runner-up with Williams.

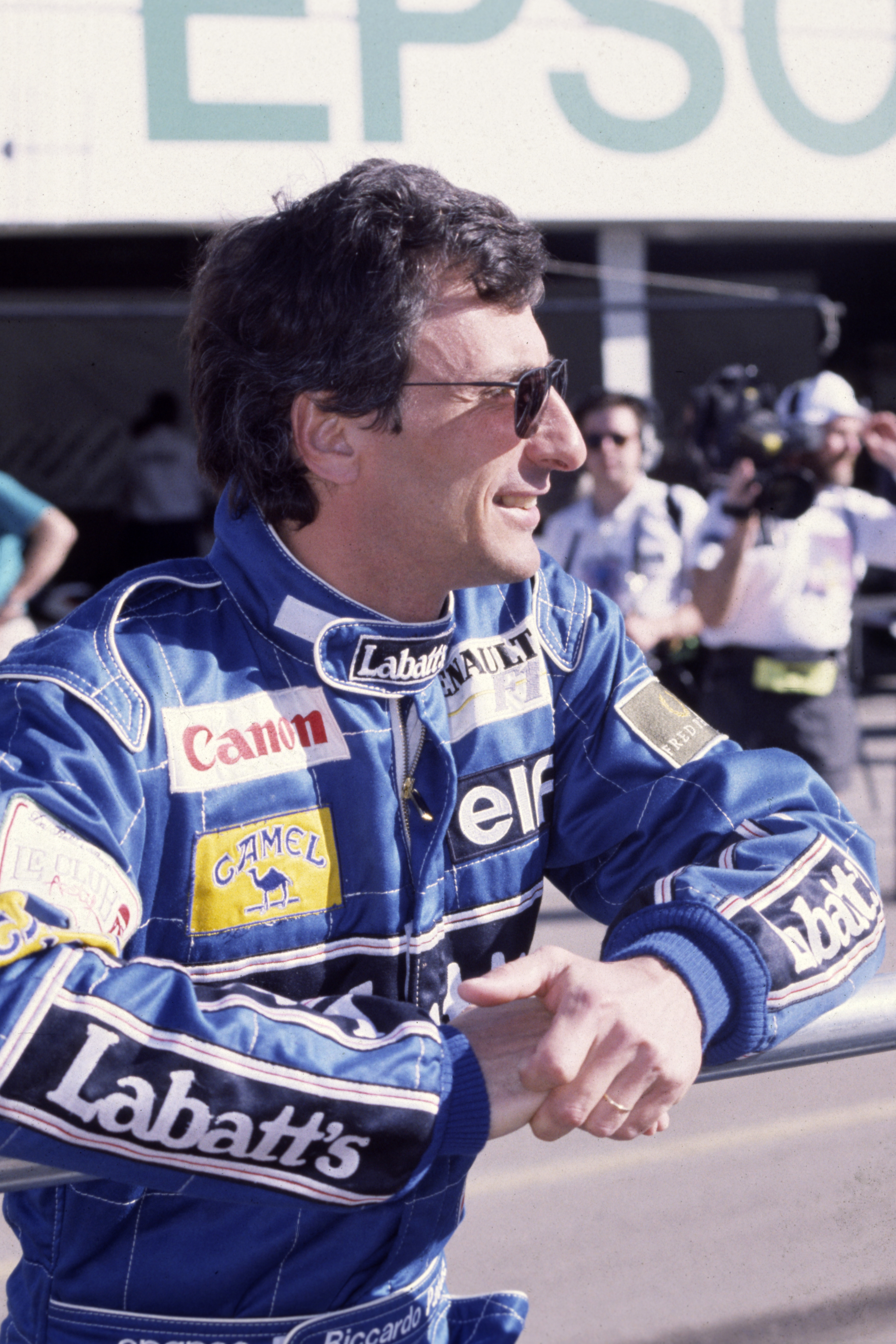
Mansell's teammate Riccardo Patrese ended the season ranked third.

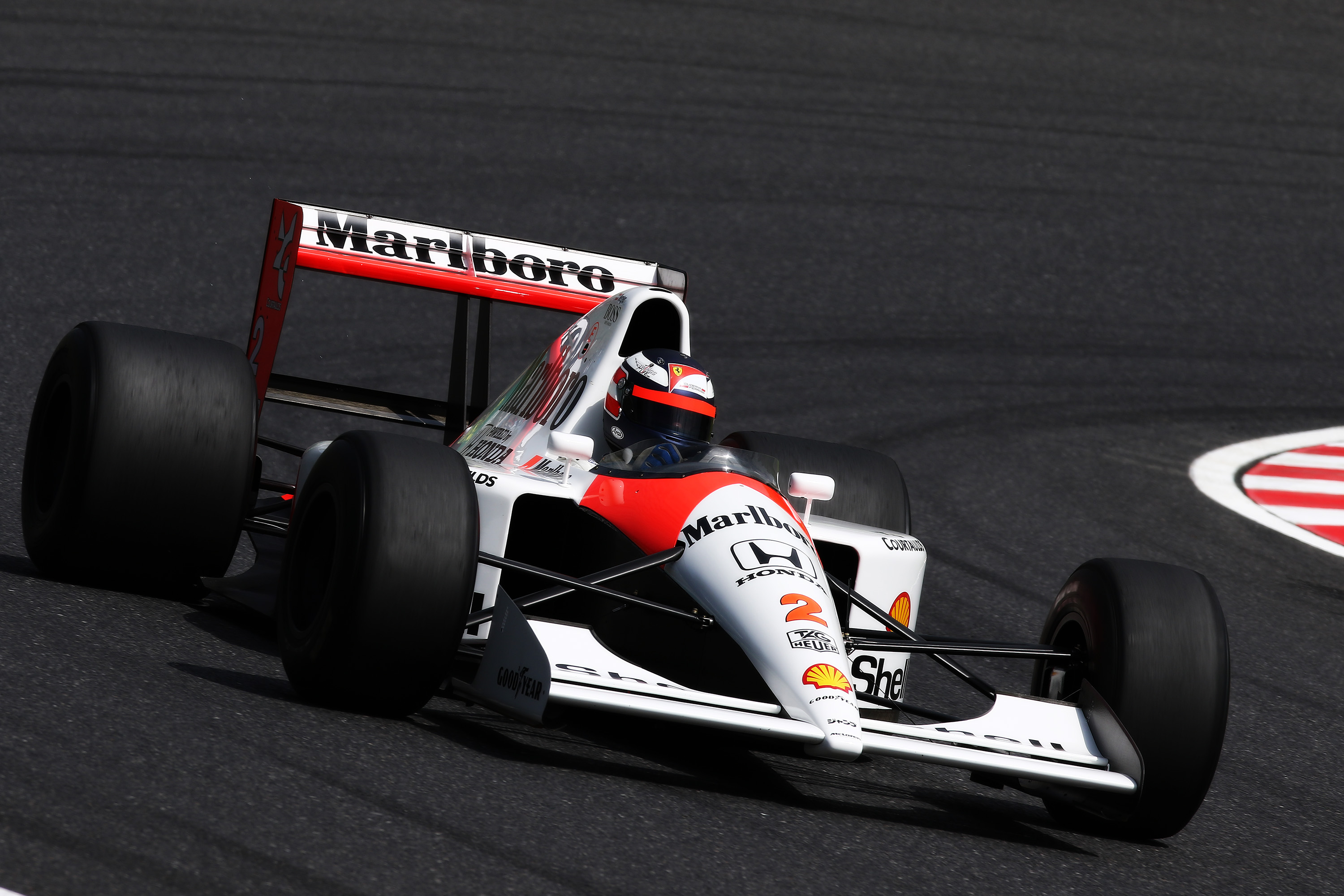
McLaren won the Constructors' Championship with the Honda-powered MP4/6.

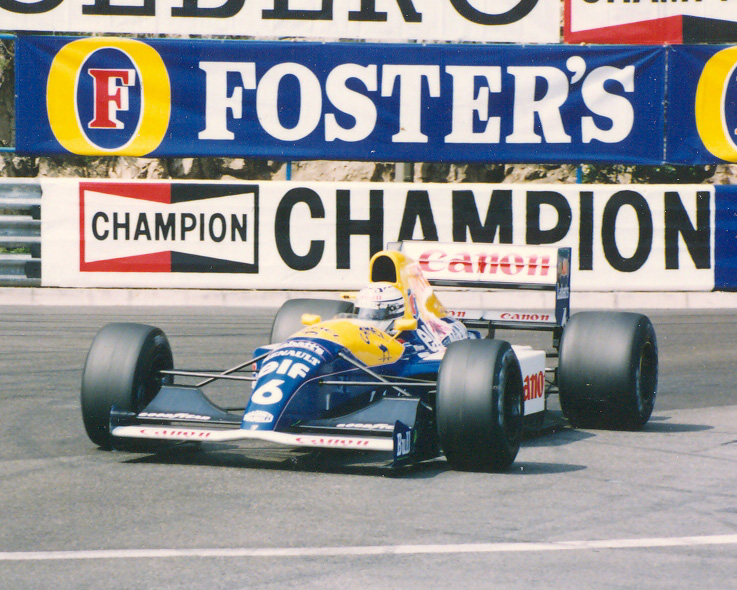
Williams finished second in the Constructors' Championship with the FW14.

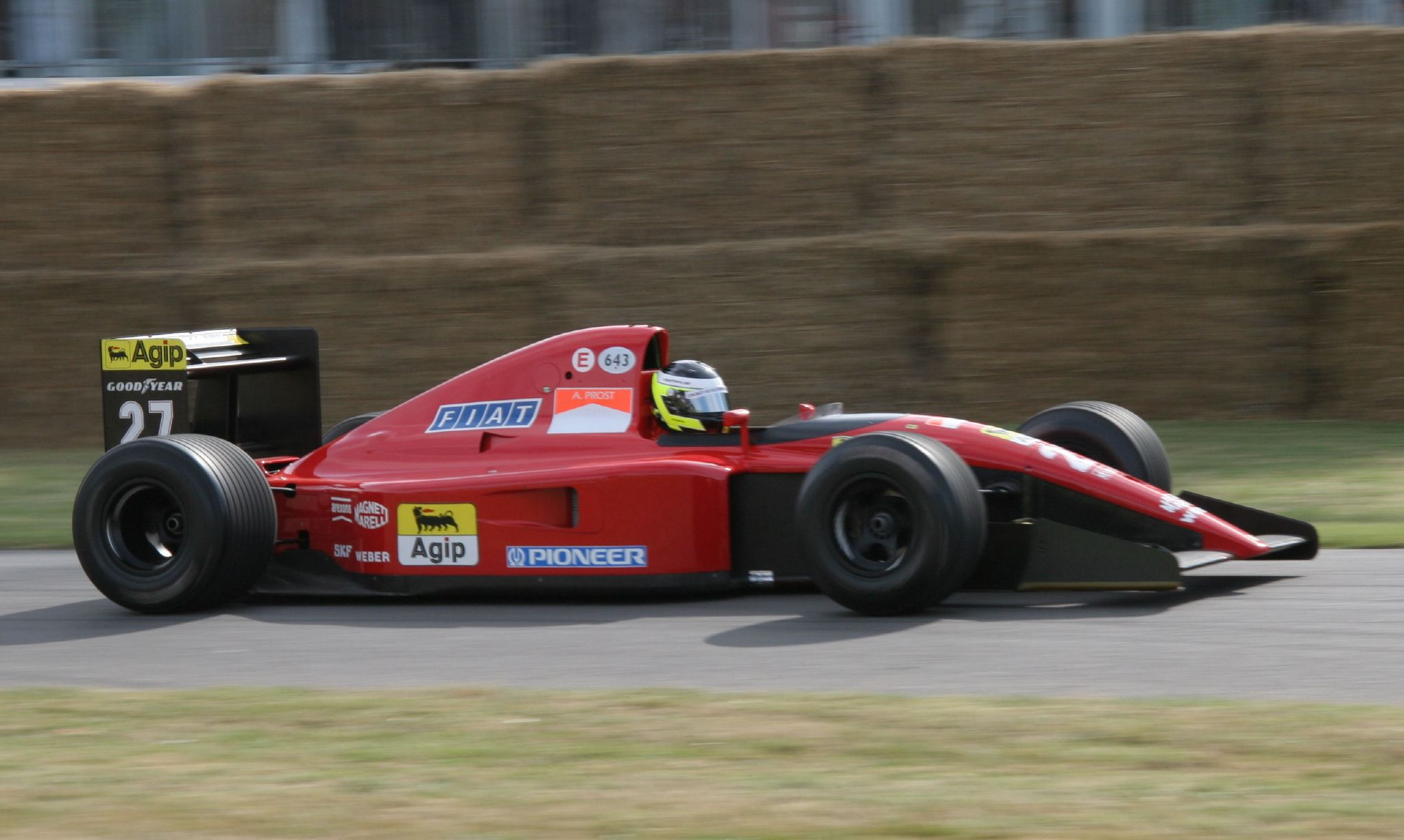
Despite not winning a single race in 1991 (which would last until the 1994 German Grand Prix), Ferrari finished third with the 642, switched mid-season to the 643 (shown).

The 1991 FIA Formula One World Championship was the 45th season of FIA Formula One motor racing and the 42nd season of the Formula One World Championship. It featured the 1991 Formula One World Championship for Drivers and the 1991 Formula One World Championship for Constructors, which were contested concurrently over a sixteen-race series that commenced on 10 March and ended on 3 November.

This was the first Formula One season in which every result counted towards a driver's championship standing.

Ayrton Senna won his third and last Drivers' Championship, and McLaren-Honda won their fourth consecutive Constructors' Championship. Senna won seven of the sixteen races; his main challenger for the title was Nigel Mansell, who won five races in his first season back at Williams. Alain Prost failed to win a race with Ferrari and was fired before the end of the season due to a dispute with the team. 1991 also saw the debuts of future world champions Michael Schumacher and Mika Häkkinen, as well as the retirement of three-time champion Nelson Piquet.

As of 2026, this is the last World Championship season to be won by a Brazilian racing driver. It was the last drivers' title won using a Honda-powered car until Max Verstappen in 2021 and the last constructors' title won by a Honda-powered car until the Red Bull Racing RB19 in 2023.

This season was the last time an F1 car with a manual gearbox won the championship, and the last V12-powered car to do so. It was also Pirelli's last season as Formula One's tyre supplier until 2011.

== Drivers and constructors ==
The following teams and drivers competed in the 1991 FIA Formula One World Championship.

Entrant	Constructor	Chassis	Engine	Tyre	No	Driver	Rounds
(United Kingdom) Honda Marlboro McLaren	McLaren-Honda	MP4/6	Honda RA121E 3.5 V12	G	1	(Brazil) Ayrton Senna	All
(United Kingdom) Honda Marlboro McLaren	McLaren-Honda	MP4/6	Honda RA121E 3.5 V12	G	2	(Austria) Gerhard Berger	All
(United Kingdom) Braun Tyrrell Honda	Tyrrell-Honda	020	Honda RA101E 3.5 V10	P	3	(Japan) Satoru Nakajima	All
(United Kingdom) Braun Tyrrell Honda	Tyrrell-Honda	020	Honda RA101E 3.5 V10	P	4	(Italy) Stefano Modena	All
(United Kingdom) Canon Williams Renault	Williams-Renault	FW14	Renault RS3 3.5 V10	G	5	(United Kingdom) Nigel Mansell	All
(United Kingdom) Canon Williams Renault	Williams-Renault	FW14	Renault RS3 3.5 V10	G	6	(Italy) Riccardo Patrese	All
(United Kingdom) Brabham Yamaha F1 Team	Brabham-Yamaha	BT59Y; BT60Y	Yamaha OX99 3.5 V12	P	7	(United Kingdom) Martin Brundle	All
(United Kingdom) Brabham Yamaha F1 Team	Brabham-Yamaha	BT59Y; BT60Y	Yamaha OX99 3.5 V12	P	8	(United Kingdom) Mark Blundell	All
(United Kingdom) Footwork Porsche (United Kingdom) Footwork Ford	Footwork-Porsche	A11C; FA12	Porsche 3512 3.5 V12	G	9	(Italy) Michele Alboreto	1–6
(United Kingdom) Footwork Porsche (United Kingdom) Footwork Ford	Footwork-Porsche	A11C; FA12	Porsche 3512 3.5 V12	G	10	(Italy) Alex Caffi	1–4
(United Kingdom) Footwork Porsche (United Kingdom) Footwork Ford	Footwork-Porsche	A11C; FA12	Porsche 3512 3.5 V12	G	10	(Sweden) Stefan Johansson	5–6
(United Kingdom) Footwork Porsche (United Kingdom) Footwork Ford	Footwork-Ford	FA12C	Ford Cosworth DFR 3.5 V8	G	9	(Italy) Michele Alboreto	7–16
(United Kingdom) Footwork Porsche (United Kingdom) Footwork Ford	Footwork-Ford	FA12C	Ford Cosworth DFR 3.5 V8	G	10	(Sweden) Stefan Johansson	7–8
(United Kingdom) Footwork Porsche (United Kingdom) Footwork Ford	Footwork-Ford	FA12C	Ford Cosworth DFR 3.5 V8	G	10	(Italy) Alex Caffi	9–16
(United Kingdom) Team Lotus	Lotus-Judd	102B	Judd EV 3.5 V8	G	11	(Finland) Mika Häkkinen	All
(United Kingdom) Team Lotus	Lotus-Judd	102B	Judd EV 3.5 V8	G	12	(United Kingdom) Julian Bailey	1–4
(United Kingdom) Team Lotus	Lotus-Judd	102B	Judd EV 3.5 V8	G	12	(United Kingdom) Johnny Herbert	5–8, 11, 13, 15–16
(United Kingdom) Team Lotus	Lotus-Judd	102B	Judd EV 3.5 V8	G	12	(Germany) Michael Bartels	9–10, 12, 14
(Italy) Fondmetal	Fondmetal-Ford	FA1M-E; Fomet-1	Ford Cosworth DFR 3.5 V8	G	14	(France) Olivier Grouillard	1–13
(Italy) Fondmetal	Fondmetal-Ford	FA1M-E; Fomet-1	Ford Cosworth DFR 3.5 V8	G	14	(Italy) Gabriele Tarquini	14–16
(United Kingdom) Leyton House Racing	Leyton House-Ilmor	CG911	Ilmor 2175A 3.5 V10	G	15	(Brazil) Maurício Gugelmin	All
(United Kingdom) Leyton House Racing	Leyton House-Ilmor	CG911	Ilmor 2175A 3.5 V10	G	16	(Italy) Ivan Capelli	1–14
(United Kingdom) Leyton House Racing	Leyton House-Ilmor	CG911	Ilmor 2175A 3.5 V10	G	16	(Austria) Karl Wendlinger	15–16
(France) AGS	AGS-Ford	JH25B; JH27	Ford Cosworth DFR 3.5 V8	G	17	(Italy) Gabriele Tarquini	1–13
(France) AGS	AGS-Ford	JH25B; JH27	Ford Cosworth DFR 3.5 V8	G	17	(France) Olivier Grouillard	14
(France) AGS	AGS-Ford	JH25B; JH27	Ford Cosworth DFR 3.5 V8	G	18	(Sweden) Stefan Johansson	1–2
(France) AGS	AGS-Ford	JH25B; JH27	Ford Cosworth DFR 3.5 V8	G	18	(Italy) Fabrizio Barbazza	3–14
(United Kingdom) Camel Benetton Ford	Benetton-Ford	B190B; B191	Ford HBA4 3.5 V8; Ford HBA5 3.5 V8	P	19	(Brazil) Roberto Moreno	1–11
(United Kingdom) Camel Benetton Ford	Benetton-Ford	B190B; B191	Ford HBA4 3.5 V8; Ford HBA5 3.5 V8	P	19	(Germany) Michael Schumacher	12–16
(United Kingdom) Camel Benetton Ford	Benetton-Ford	B190B; B191	Ford HBA4 3.5 V8; Ford HBA5 3.5 V8	P	20	(Brazil) Nelson Piquet	All
(Italy) BMS Scuderia Italia	BMS Dallara-Judd	F191	Judd GV 3.5 V10	P	21	(Italy) Emanuele Pirro	All
(Italy) BMS Scuderia Italia	BMS Dallara-Judd	F191	Judd GV 3.5 V10	P	22	(Finland) JJ Lehto	All
(Italy) Minardi Team	Minardi-Ferrari	M191	Ferrari Tipo 037 3.5 V12	G	23	(Italy) Pierluigi Martini	All
(Italy) Minardi Team	Minardi-Ferrari	M191	Ferrari Tipo 037 3.5 V12	G	24	(Italy) Gianni Morbidelli	1–15
(Italy) Minardi Team	Minardi-Ferrari	M191	Ferrari Tipo 037 3.5 V12	G	24	(Brazil) Roberto Moreno	16
(France) Équipe Ligier Gitanes	Ligier-Lamborghini	JS35; JS35B	Lamborghini LE3512 3.5 V12	G	25	(Belgium) Thierry Boutsen	All
(France) Équipe Ligier Gitanes	Ligier-Lamborghini	JS35; JS35B	Lamborghini LE3512 3.5 V12	G	26	(France) Érik Comas	All
(Italy) Scuderia Ferrari	Ferrari	642; 642/2; 643	Ferrari Tipo 037 3.5 V12	G	27	(France) Alain Prost	1–15
(Italy) Scuderia Ferrari	Ferrari	642; 642/2; 643	Ferrari Tipo 037 3.5 V12	G	27	(Italy) Gianni Morbidelli	16
(Italy) Scuderia Ferrari	Ferrari	642; 642/2; 643	Ferrari Tipo 037 3.5 V12	G	28	(France) Jean Alesi	All
(France) Larrousse F1	Lola-Ford	LC91	Ford Cosworth DFR 3.5 V8	G	29	(France) Éric Bernard	1–15
(France) Larrousse F1	Lola-Ford	LC91	Ford Cosworth DFR 3.5 V8	G	29	(Belgium) Bertrand Gachot	16
(France) Larrousse F1	Lola-Ford	LC91	Ford Cosworth DFR 3.5 V8	G	30	(Japan) Aguri Suzuki	All
(Italy) Coloni	Coloni-Ford	C4	Ford Cosworth DFR 3.5 V8	G	31	(Portugal) Pedro Chaves	1–13
(Italy) Coloni	Coloni-Ford	C4	Ford Cosworth DFR 3.5 V8	G	31	(Japan) Naoki Hattori	15–16
(Republic of Ireland) Team 7Up Jordan	Jordan-Ford	191	Ford HBA4 3.5 V8	G	32	(Belgium) Bertrand Gachot	1–10
(Republic of Ireland) Team 7Up Jordan	Jordan-Ford	191	Ford HBA4 3.5 V8	G	32	(Germany) Michael Schumacher	11
(Republic of Ireland) Team 7Up Jordan	Jordan-Ford	191	Ford HBA4 3.5 V8	G	32	(Brazil) Roberto Moreno	12–13
(Republic of Ireland) Team 7Up Jordan	Jordan-Ford	191	Ford HBA4 3.5 V8	G	32	(Italy) Alessandro Zanardi	14–16
(Republic of Ireland) Team 7Up Jordan	Jordan-Ford	191	Ford HBA4 3.5 V8	G	33	(Italy) Andrea de Cesaris	All
(Italy) Central Park Modena Team	Lambo-Lamborghini	291	Lamborghini LE3512 3.5 V12	G	34	(Italy) Nicola Larini	All
(Italy) Central Park Modena Team	Lambo-Lamborghini	291	Lamborghini LE3512 3.5 V12	G	35	(Belgium) Eric van de Poele	All

=== Team changes ===
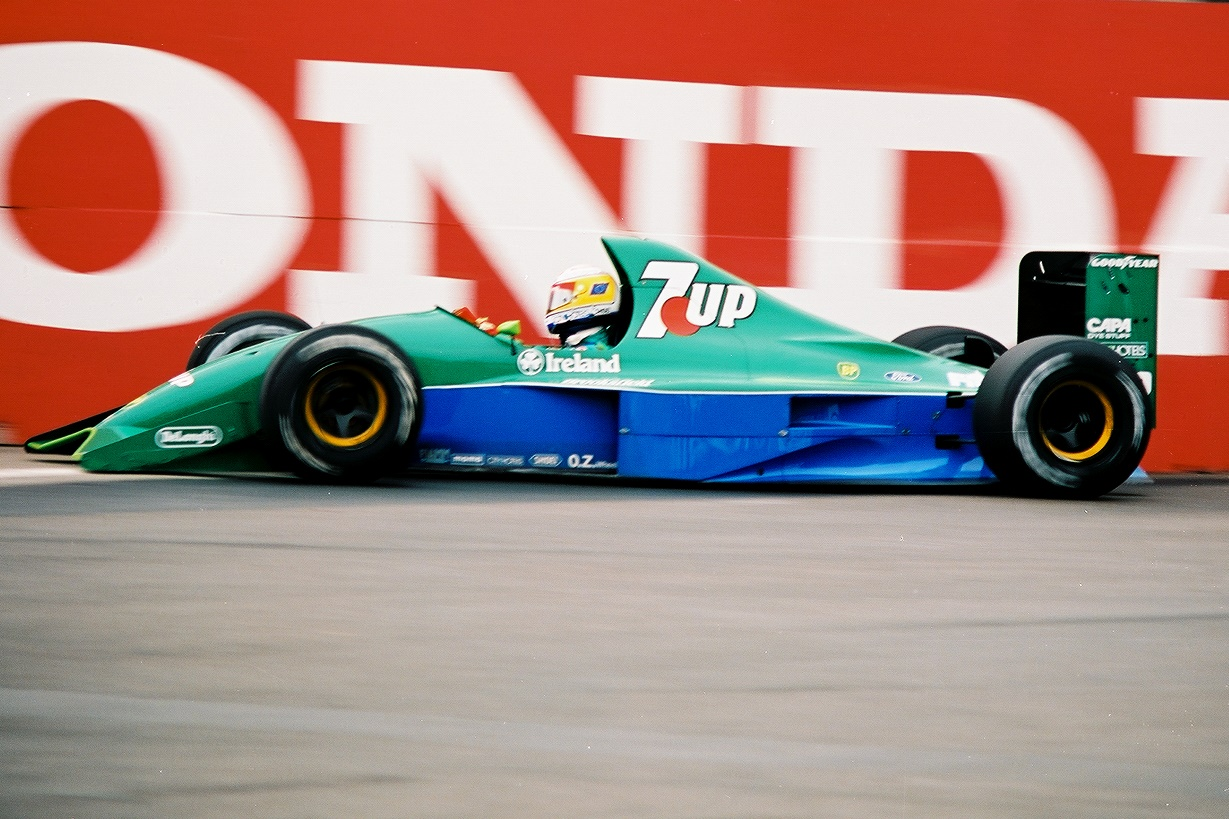
Bertrand Gachot in the Jordan during the US GP

- Jordan Grand Prix debuted in F1 after a successful Formula 3000 campaign.
- Lotus went back to using Judd V8 power in 1991, after a dismal 1990 using the fast but fragile Lamborghini V12 engine
- Lamborghini took it upon themselves to build a chassis for the 1991 season. When the operations relocated to Modena, Italy, they changed the team's name to Modena.
- Osella's owner sold his majority shares to the Fondmetal company and the Osella name disappeared from F1.
- Arrows received an investment from Footwork in 1990 and, for this year, the team was renamed Footwork. The Arrows name returned after a buy-out in 1996.
- Teams EuroBrun, Onyx and Life withdrew before the 1991 season.

==== Mid-season changes ====
- Footwork moved engine suppliers after six races, going from Porsche to Hart-prepared Cosworth engines.
- AGS ran out of money and closed its doors two races before the end of the season.

=== Driver changes ===
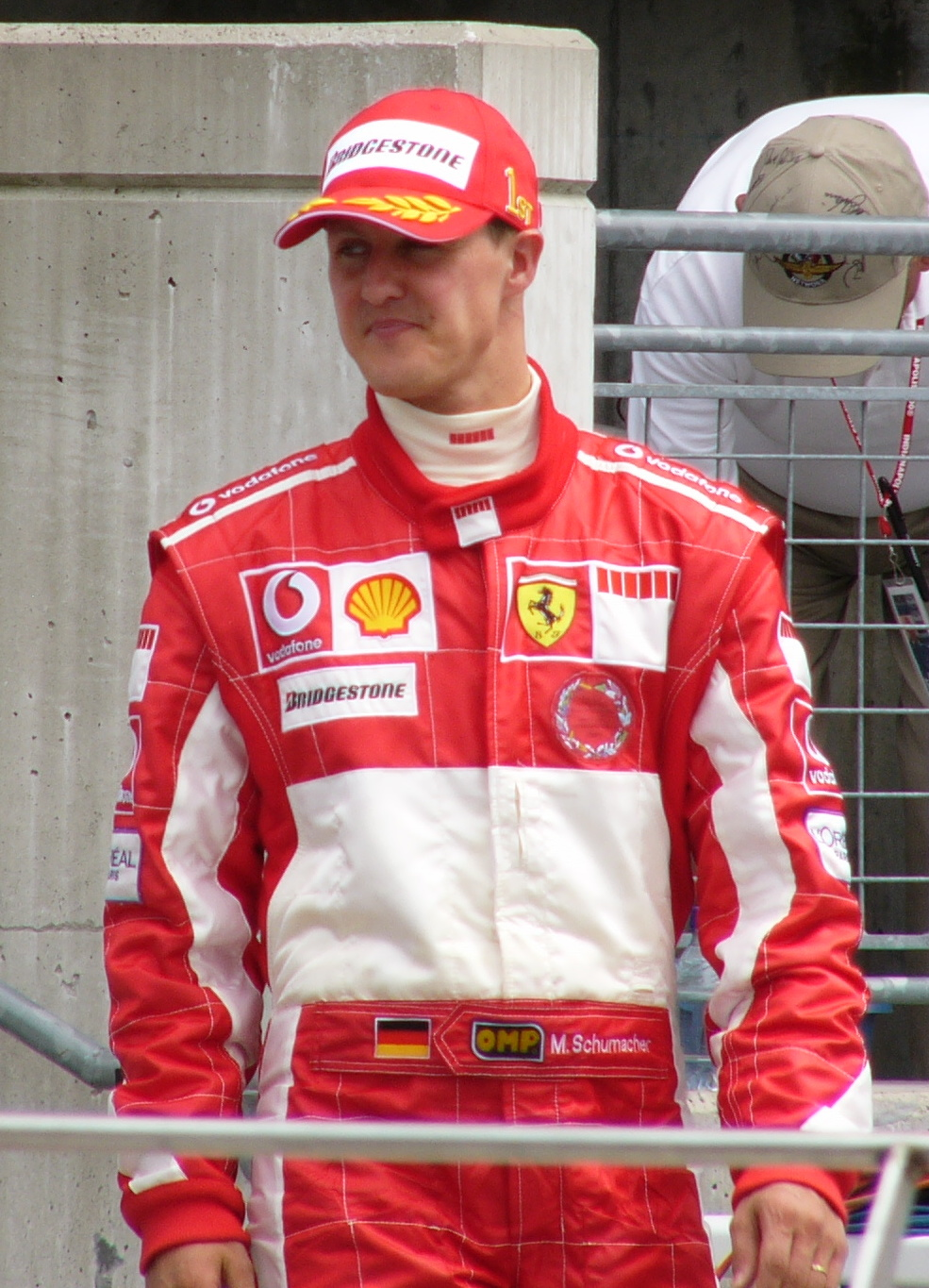
Michael Schumacher (pictured in 2005) made his debut this season with Jordan before joining Benetton.

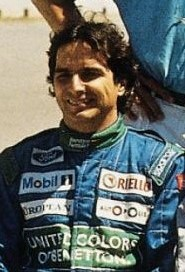
Nelson Piquet retired from Formula One after 14 seasons.

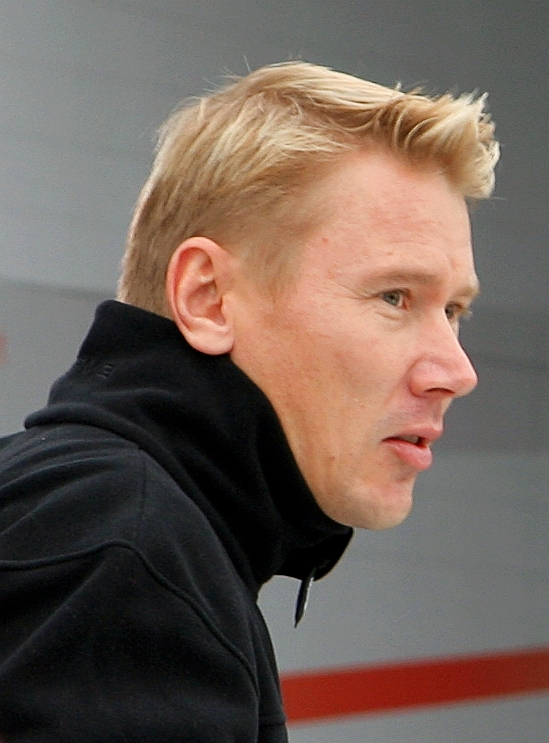
Mika Häkkinen (pictured in 2006) made his debut with Lotus.

- Nigel Mansell moved from Ferrari to Williams, replacing Thierry Boutsen, who went to Ligier. Next to Boutsen was F3000 driver Érik Comas making his Formula 1 debut.
- Ferrari replaced Mansell with Jean Alesi, after impressing the Italian squad when driving for Tyrrell in 1990. His seat at Tyrrell was filled by Stefano Modena, whose place at Brabham was taken up by sports car driver Mark Blundell.
- Jordan hired Bertrand Gachot and Andrea de Cesaris as their first pair of drivers. Gachot promoted from Coloni, de Cesaris from Scuderia Italia. Coloni hired British Formula 3000 champion Pedro Chaves, while Scuderia Italia hired JJ Lehto.
- Lotus hired British Formula 3 champion Mika Häkkinen. Beside him, Julian Bailey returned to F1 after three years.
- Lamborghini entered Formula 1 with a self-designed chassis, after spending two years as an engine supplier. They hired Eric van de Poele, runner-up in the 1990 International Formula 3000 Championship, and ex-Ligier driver Nicola Larini.
- AGS replaced Yannick Dalmas with experienced driver Stefan Johansson.

==== Mid-season changes ====
- Future champion Michael Schumacher made his debut with Jordan in the Belgian Grand Prix, replacing Bertrand Gachot when he was given an 18-month prison sentence for assault which he appealed and was released two months later. Eddie Jordan paid $150,000 to Mercedes-Benz, since the German was under contract with their sports cars team. He outqualified veteran Andrea de Cesaris and moved up to the Benetton team just one race later.
- Benetton's driver Roberto Moreno was paid off to make room, but was offered Schumacher's seat at Jordan. However, he was replaced after two races by rising F3000 star Alessandro Zanardi. He ended the season at Minardi, to fill in for Gianni Morbidelli.
- Morbidelli's services were required by Ferrari at the Australian Grand Prix after they fired Alain Prost.
- Before the Canadian Grand Prix, Julian Bailey was replaced at Lotus with Johnny Herbert. On the weekends that Herbert was engaged in the Japanese F3000 series, Michael Bartels filled the seat.
- Bertrand Gachot returned to F1 for the last race of the season, replacing Éric Bernard at Larrousse.
- At the struggling Leyton House Racing team, Karl Wendlinger made his debut, bringing a sum of money with him, during the Japanese Grand Prix in place of long-serving Ivan Capelli.
- Three races from the end of the season, Olivier Grouillard at Fondmetal switched seats with Gabriele Tarquini at AGS. Unfortunately, AGS closed operations just one race later.
- Stefan Johansson drove just two races for AGS before being replaced with Fabrizio Barbazza. Later in the season, Johansson drove four races for Footwork, as a temporary replacement for Alex Caffi, who was injured in a road accident.
- Coloni driver Pedro Chaves left the team failing to pre-qualify for 13 Grands Prix. He was replaced by 1990 Japanese Formula 3 champion Naoki Hattori.

== Calendar ==
Round	Grand Prix	Circuit	Date
1	United States Grand Prix	(United States) Phoenix Street Circuit, Phoenix, Arizona	10 March
2	Brazilian Grand Prix	(Brazil) Autódromo José Carlos Pace, São Paulo	24 March
3	San Marino Grand Prix	(Italy) Autodromo Enzo e Dino Ferrari, Imola	28 April
4	Monaco Grand Prix	Circuit de Monaco, Monte Carlo	12 May
5	Canadian Grand Prix	(Canada) Circuit Gilles Villeneuve, Montréal	2 June
6	Mexican Grand Prix	Autódromo Hermanos Rodríguez, Mexico City	16 June
7	French Grand Prix	(France) Circuit de Nevers Magny-Cours, Magny-Cours	7 July
8	British Grand Prix	(United Kingdom) Silverstone Circuit, Silverstone	14 July
9	German Grand Prix	(Germany) Hockenheimring, Hockenheim	28 July
10	Hungarian Grand Prix	(Hungary) Hungaroring, Mogyoród	11 August
11	Belgian Grand Prix	(Belgium) Circuit de Spa-Francorchamps, Stavelot	25 August
12	Italian Grand Prix	(Italy) Autodromo Nazionale di Monza, Monza	8 September
13	Portuguese Grand Prix	(Portugal) Autódromo do Estoril, Estoril	22 September
14	Spanish Grand Prix	(Spain) Circuit de Catalunya, Montmeló	29 September
15	Japanese Grand Prix	(Japan) Suzuka International Racing Course, Suzuka	20 October
16	Australian Grand Prix	(Australia) Adelaide Street Circuit, Adelaide	3 November

=== Calendar changes ===
- The French Grand Prix was moved from Circuit Paul Ricard to Circuit de Nevers Magny-Cours.
- The Spanish Grand Prix was moved from Circuito de Jerez to Circuit de Catalunya.

== Regulation changes ==
=== Technical regulations ===
Four regulation changes were made to reduce aerodynamic efficiency and overall grip:

- The front wing was narrowed from 150 cm (59 in) to 140 cm (55 in).
- The front overhang was reduced from 120 cm (47 in) to 100 cm (39 in).
- The rear overhang was reduced from 60 cm (24 in) to 50 cm (20 in).
- The rubbing strips on the front wing had to be raised so that, from the front of the car to the front axle centrline, no part was closer than 25 mm (0.98 in) to the ground.

On the topic of safety, the FIA would perform more stringent testing of the survival cell, including seat belts, fuel tanks and rollbar.

The minimum weight (without driver) was raised from 500 kg (1,100 lb) to 505 kg (1,113 lb).

=== Sporting regulations ===
- The winning driver was now awarded 10 points instead of 9 as previously.
- More significantly, points from all races would now count towards the drivers' championship, instead of only each driver's best eleven results as previously.

== Race-by-race ==
=== Race 1: USA ===
The season started off at the Phoenix street circuit that had a modified layout to make it more of a challenge to drivers. Senna took pole ahead of Prost, Patrese, Mansell, Piquet and Alesi. At the start, Senna and Prost maintained their places while Mansell sliced ahead of Patrese and Piquet lost out to Alesi and Berger. The order at the end of lap 1 was: Senna, Prost, Mansell, Patrese, Alesi and Berger.

Early on, as Senna was pulling away from Prost, Alesi got past Patrese for fourth. However, Patrese repassed him on lap 16 and closed up on Mansell. He attacked on lap 22 but shot into an escape road and rejoined behind Alesi and Berger. He quickly closed up on them with Berger attacking Alesi but unable to pass. Patrese passed Berger on lap 34. On the next lap, Mansell's gearbox failed and soon afterward, on lap 36, Berger had fuel pump trouble, which forced him to retire. Patrese then passed Alesi who pitted on lap 43. He closed in on Prost and the Ferrari pitted on lap 46, with right rear troubles putting him down to seventh.

Patrese didn't last much longer, his gearbox failing and then the stationary car was hit by Roberto Moreno, forcing both of them out. Piquet, who did not stop, was passed by Alesi for second with Prost taking fourth off Stefano Modena soon after. Alesi was having gearbox troubles and was holding back Piquet as Prost began to attack both of them. On lap 70, Piquet passed Alesi and Prost followed him through. Prost then shifted sides getting ahead of Piquet as well. Modena passed Alesi for fourth and Alesi soon retired with gearbox troubles. Unflustered by all this, Senna won from Prost, Piquet, Modena, Satoru Nakajima and Aguri Suzuki. This would be the last Formula One Grand Prix on the streets of downtown Phoenix, Arizona and the last Formula One race in the United States for 9 years; Formula One would return to a very different part of the United States in 2000 – the historic Indianapolis Motor Speedway, that had a whole new road course built within the facility just for the Grand Prix.

=== Race 2: Brazil ===
The field traveled to Brazil and Senna pleased his fans at the Interlagos circuit in his home city of São Paulo by taking pole at his home track ahead of the two Williams cars of Patrese and Mansell who were in front of Berger, Alesi and Prost. At the start, Senna took off and Mansell got by Patrese while Alesi got by Berger and Piquet got ahead of Prost. The order was: Senna, Mansell, Patrese, Alesi, Berger and Piquet.

Mansell began to attack Senna but could not pass. Senna then slowly pulled away from Mansell who had a slow pit stop on lap 22. He stayed second after the stops but 7 seconds behind Senna, the major change as a result of the stops was that Piquet who did not stop was third and that Berger and Prost had got by Alesi.

Berger blasted past Piquet soon afterward as Mansell began to catch Senna. Mansell was closing in but had to stop on lap 50 with a puncture. He charged back towards Senna who was experiencing gearbox troubles. However, it was Mansell's gearbox which ironically gave way on lap 60. Patrese was having the same problem but still running in second and Berger was having trouble with a sticking throttle. It began to rain and Prost passed Piquet for fourth. The top three struggled with the wet conditions; especially Senna, who had gearbox trouble and only had 6th gear. Senna won followed by Patrese, Berger, Prost, Piquet and Alesi.

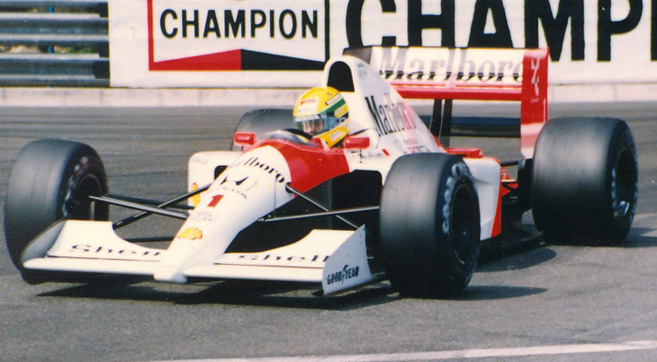
Senna won seven Grands Prix in 1991 en route to his third and final title.

=== Race 3: San Marino ===
At Imola, Senna took his 55th pole position ahead of Patrese, Prost, Mansell, Berger and Modena. It rained as they were approaching the start and Prost spun off on the parade lap and was out. At the start, Patrese got ahead of Senna while Mansell had gearbox problems and retired after being hit by Martin Brundle's Brabham. The order was: Patrese, Senna, Berger, Modena, Alesi and Nakajima.

Patrese pulled away but pitted on lap 10 with a misfire and rejoined several laps down. On lap 16, Nakajima retired from fourth with transmission failure. After the stops, Senna stayed ahead of Berger while Moreno got fourth from Pierluigi Martini. Soon afterward JJ Lehto passed Martini to take fifth. At the front, the gap between Senna and Berger was stable. Modena retired on lap 42 with transmission troubles, promoting Moreno to third which he held only for eight laps when Lehto passed him. On lap 52, Moreno retired with an engine failure. On the last lap, Eric van de Poele was set for a 5th-place finish but retired with a fuel pump problem. At the front, Senna won ahead of Berger, Lehto, Martini, Mika Häkkinen and Julian Bailey.

=== Race 4: Monaco ===
Senna took another pole in Monaco with Modena a surprising second ahead of Patrese, Piquet, Mansell and Berger. At the start, Berger hit Piquet and Piquet was out while Berger dropped to the back. The order was: Senna, Modena, Patrese, Mansell, Prost and Moreno.

With overtaking hard on the Monaco streets, there were no changes until Prost got past Mansell on lap 30. By now, Senna was over 10 seconds ahead of Modena, who was holding up Patrese. Soon afterward, Alesi passed Moreno for fourth and pulled away. Meanwhile, Nakajima in the other Tyrrell further down had spun off the track after making contact with Martini's Minardi on lap 35. On lap 43, Modena's engine blew in the tunnel and this blocked Patrese, who spun off into the wall and both were out, as ironically Alboreto well down in the Footwork had also retired with a blown Porsche engine in the Footwork leaving additional oil on the track at the Nouvelle chicane which later left Blundell's Brabham to spin off into the wall out of 10th place behind the leaders by lap 44 just after overtaking Bernard before he crashed.

Mansell was putting pressure on Prost, who had trouble with a loose wheel, and made a daring move through the chicane on lap 63 to take second and then really started flying with fastest lap after fastest lap before Prost eventually set the fastest lap on lap 77 (14 laps after his pit-stop as he was a lap down in 5th place). Soon afterward, Prost was forced to stop to change the wheel and dropped down to fifth. Senna took his fourth win in four ahead of Mansell, Alesi, Moreno, Prost and Emanuele Pirro.

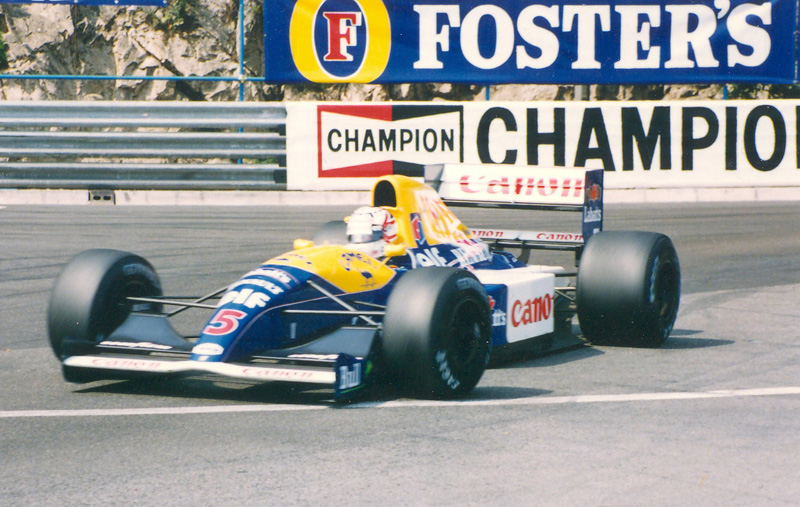
Nigel Mansell was Senna's closest challenger, winning five races and eventually finishing second in the championship.

=== Race 5: Canada ===
At the Circuit Gilles Villeneuve in Montreal, the Williams cars were 1–2 in qualifying, Patrese on pole ahead of Mansell, Senna, Prost, Moreno and Berger. At the start, Mansell got ahead of Patrese while Berger slipped past Moreno. It was Mansell leading from Patrese, Senna, Prost, Berger and Moreno. On lap 5, Berger retired with battery troubles but Moreno could take fifth only for 5 more laps before he spun off into retirement.

Mansell and Patrese were pulling away from Senna while there was a battle for fourth between Prost, Alesi and Piquet. On lap 26, Senna retired with alternator troubles and two laps later Prost was out with a failed gearbox. Alesi was third but on lap 35, his engine expired. This put Mansell in front of Patrese, Piquet, Modena, Andrea de Cesaris and Ivan Capelli. Patrese had to pit with a puncture and rejoined behind Piquet. He then had gearbox troubles and was passed by Modena as Capelli spun off.

On the last lap, Mansell waved to the crowd, and then he let his car's revs drop too low and stalled the Renault engine. This left a delighted Piquet to take his last career win ahead of Modena, Patrese, de Cesaris, Bertrand Gachot and Mansell who was classified sixth.

=== Race 6: Mexico ===
The extremely bumpy Hermanos Rodriguez Autodrome in Mexico saw a number of incidents during practice, including Senna crashing at the very fast Peraltada while trying to take it a bit faster than usual and his car overturned when it hit the tire barrier. Senna had come to Mexico City with a head injury that he got while jetskiing in Brazil, and had been critical of the dusty circuit's condition all through the weekend. Williams took 1–2 in qualifying with Patrese ahead of Mansell, Senna, Alesi, Berger and Piquet. Patrese made a poor start and lost three places while Alesi dived ahead of Senna. The order was: Mansell, Alesi, Senna, Patrese, Berger and Piquet. There was action as Senna passed Alesi with Patrese following him through and then Modena getting by Piquet.

Berger's engine failed on lap 6 and soon afterwards Patrese passed Senna and set off after Mansell. Modena then began to drop back. Patrese passed Mansell and then both Senna and Alesi had a go at the Englishman with Alesi spinning and dropping back to seventh. Patrese then began to pull away from Mansell who was holding up Senna. Meanwhile, Alesi passed Moreno and then de Cesaris as Mansell pulled away from Senna. He closed the gap to Patrese to 1.2 seconds before Patrese increased his pace and made the gap stable.

Alesi's clutch failed on lap 43 and Piquet had wheel bearing troubles two laps later and thus Gachot was fifth. He held it until he spun off on lap 52. At the front, Patrese won with Mansell making it a Williams 1–2 ahead of Senna, de Cesaris, Moreno and Éric Bernard.

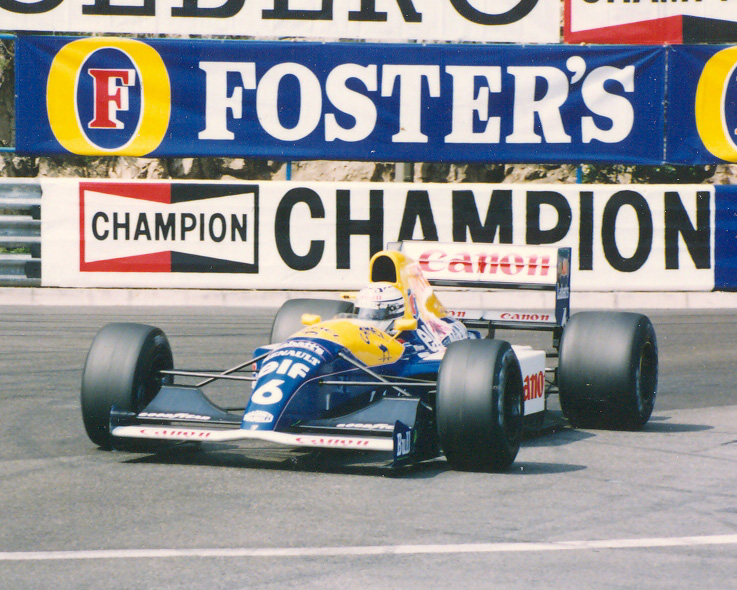
Riccardo Patrese proved to be a strong force in the other Williams, winning two Grands Prix.

=== Race 7: France ===
The French Grand Prix had moved from the Paul Ricard circuit near Marseille in southern France to the new Magny-Cours circuit in central France. Patrese took another pole ahead of home hero Prost, Senna, Mansell, Berger and Alesi. At the start, Patrese had problems selecting his gear, and when he did start his car, he was engulfed by the field. This blocked Senna allowing Mansell to get ahead of him. The order was: Prost, Mansell, Senna, Berger, Alesi and Piquet.

On lap 6, Berger retired with yet another engine failure. Two laps later, there was trouble as Piquet lost places as Gianni Morbidelli tried to pass him and hit Capelli, taking both out while Piquet lost time and places. At the front, Mansell attacked Prost and passed him on lap 22. At the stops, Mansell had a slow one and Prost was back in the lead. Senna was under pressure from Alesi but holding him at bay, over 15 seconds behind the leaders.

Meanwhile, Mansell again began to close in on Prost and as the two wound through traffic on lap 54, Mansell made a superb move on the outside of the Adelaide hairpin to lead and then slowly pulled away. Mansell won from Prost, Senna, Alesi, the recovering Patrese and de Cesaris.

=== Race 8: Great Britain ===
The Silverstone circuit had been heavily modified; it was no longer the simplistic, ultra-fast circuit it had been since its inception; it was now more of a technical circuit, but it was still relatively fast. Mansell took pole position ahead of Senna, Patrese, Berger, Prost and Alesi. At the start, Senna took the lead from Mansell while Berger hit Patrese, spinning Patrese out while Berger dropped down the order, behind Prost, Alesi and Moreno. At the front, Mansell turned off the rev-limiter to accelerate past Senna into the Hangar straight. Thus Mansell led from Senna, Alesi, Prost, Moreno and Berger.

Soon Berger passed Moreno for fifth and this became fourth when Prost spun, dropping two places. Moreno then retired with gearbox troubles. At the front, the gap between Mansell and Senna was around 4–5 seconds with Alesi third, a long way back. However, when he was trying to lap Suzuki, he hit Suzuki, taking both out. After the stops, Mansell stayed 10 seconds ahead of Senna with Berger a long way back but 20 seconds ahead of Prost.

Senna decided to try with a light fuel load to attack Mansell. He closed the gap to 7 seconds but because of that, he ran out of fuel on the last lap, which gave Mansell the opportunity to pick up the stranded Brazilian on his victory lap and drive him back to pit lane. Therefore, Mansell won ahead of Berger, Prost, Senna (classified fourth for starting final lap), Piquet and Gachot.

At the halfway stage of the season, Senna led the Drivers' Championship with 51 points, with Mansell second with 33, Patrese third with 22, and Prost fourth with 21. In the Constructors' Championship, McLaren led with 67 points, Williams close in second with 55, Ferrari third with 29, and Benetton fourth with 23.

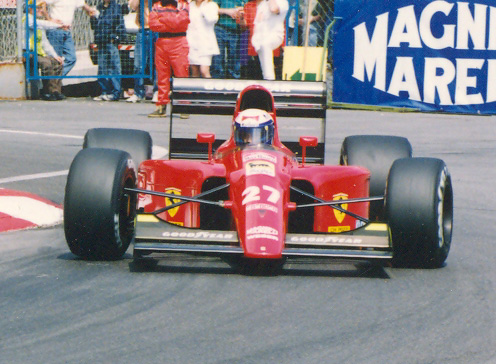
Triple champion Alain Prost had a disappointing year with Ferrari, culminating in his dismissal before the end of the season.

=== Race 9: Germany ===
At the halfway point of the season, pre-qualifying was re-arranged. Dallara, Jordan and 'Lambo' escaped, while AGS, Footwork and Brabham needed to pre-qualify for rest of the season.

The second half of the year started at the very fast forested Hockenheim circuit in Germany and Mansell continued where he left off, taking pole ahead of Senna, Berger, Patrese, Prost and Alesi. At the start, Mansell took off while Berger got by Senna and Patrese again had a poor start, dropping behind the Ferraris. At the end of the first lap, Mansell led from Berger, Senna, Prost, Alesi and Patrese.

Patrese quickly got ahead of Alesi as the order settled down. Alesi decided to go without a stop while the rest pitted. However, Berger had some trouble in the stops and dropped back to 10th. Thus, the order was Alesi leading Mansell, Senna, Prost, Patrese and de Cesaris. Mansell quickly passed Alesi to lead and then pulled away. Prost and Senna were battling for third and Prost went wide at a corner trying to pass Senna allowing Patrese to take fourth.

Patrese quickly passed Senna to leave him with a frustrated Prost. Prost tried to pass him on lap 38 but Senna did not give him enough room and Prost spun off and retired. Meanwhile, Patrese had closed right in on Alesi and passed him on lap 39. On the last lap, Senna ran out of fuel again. No one, however could touch Mansell who won, with Patrese making it a Williams 1–2 ahead of Alesi, the recovering Berger, de Cesaris and Gachot.

=== Race 10: Hungary ===
Senna took pole at the Hungaroring in Mogyoród, Hungary ahead of Patrese, Mansell, Prost, Berger and Alesi. At the start, Patrese got away better than Senna but Senna moved over to block him. Mansell was forced to defend third from Prost and kept the place. The order was: Senna, Patrese, Mansell, Prost, Berger and Alesi.

The top four stayed together and there was no way one could overtake the other on the twisting Hungaroring circuit. They pulled away from Berger who had a gap to Alesi. Prost's engine blew on lap 28, reducing the battle at the front to three. The pit stops changed nothing but after them Mansell began to hound his teammate Patrese for second. Patrese let him get past to see what Mansell can do about Senna but he realised that the answer was nothing. Senna was continuing to slowly edge away. A dull race was won by Senna ahead of Mansell, Patrese, Berger, Alesi and Capelli.

=== Race 11: Belgium ===
Belgian driver Bertrand Gachot missed his home Grand Prix due to being imprisoned in Britain following an incident in which he sprayed tear gas at a London taxi driver. His Jordan seat was filled by then-unknown German driver Michael Schumacher.

At the popular and scenic Spa-Francorchamps circuit in Belgium, Senna took pole ahead of Patrese, Prost, Mansell, Berger, Alesi, Piquet and the new sensation, Schumacher. (After Saturday qualifying, Patrese's car was found to not comply with safety regulations and Patrese's Saturday times were wiped out, thus starting 17th). At the start, Senna defended from Prost while Piquet and Schumacher got past Alesi. However, Schumacher slowed with a clutch problem on the run down to Eau Rouge and retired. At the front, Senna led from Prost, Mansell, Berger, Piquet and Alesi. On lap 3, Prost had fuel leaking out of his car and retired.

Mansell began to attack Senna and after the stops got ahead of him. There was trouble when Berger spun after his stop and lost a lot of time. After the stops, Mansell led Alesi (who planned to go without stopping), Senna, Piquet, a recovering Patrese and de Cesaris. Then on lap 22, Mansell slowed to a halt with an electrical failure, giving Alesi the lead of the race. Senna's engine then stopped for some time and because of that Piquet, Patrese and de Cesaris were right with him and allowing Alesi to remain in the lead. Senna was unable to pull away because he had gearbox troubles. On lap 31 — still intending to run non-stop — Alesi's engine blew up and Senna was back in the lead. Patrese tried to pass Piquet but went wide and de Cesaris was able to take third.

He then passed Piquet to take second, with Patrese following him through soon after. Piquet began to drop back and Berger passed him. Patrese had gearbox troubles and was suddenly behind Berger and Piquet. On lap 41, de Cesaris, around 2 seconds behind Senna retired when his engine expired. Moreno passed the struggling Patrese on the next lap. Senna won with Berger making it a McLaren 1–2 ahead of Piquet, Moreno, Patrese and Mark Blundell.

=== Race 12: Italy ===
There was controversy before the Italian Grand Prix at the Monza Autodrome near Milan as Schumacher signed a deal with Benetton which displeased Jordan who went to court. The court decided in favour of Benetton with Schumacher and Moreno swapping teams. Bernie Ecclestone assisted both teams by supplying payments to Moreno and the Jordan team. In qualifying, Senna took pole ahead of Mansell, Berger, Patrese, Prost and Alesi. At the start, Alesi steamed by Prost and hit Patrese into the first chicane and had to pit for repairs. Senna led Mansell, Berger, Patrese, Prost and Schumacher at the end of the first lap.

Patrese began to charge, passing Berger on lap 7. As Mansell was having difficulty finding a way around Senna, he put out his hand and waved Patrese ahead of him. He then attacked Senna and took the lead on lap 26. However, on the next lap, Patrese spun and he could not select full gears then. He went to the pits and retired. At the same time, Prost passed Berger to take third. Mansell now began to hound Senna and went all directions to get ahead.

He finally did it on lap 34 and Senna came into the pits for tyres. When he rejoined, the order was Mansell, Prost, Berger, Schumacher, Senna and de Cesaris. Senna was on a charge, passing Schumacher immediately after his stop. Berger then waved him through to see if he could attack Prost. Behind them, on lap 45, Piquet passed de Cesaris for sixth. Senna got ahead of Prost on the second chicane with seven laps remaining. Mansell won from Senna, Prost, Berger, Schumacher and Piquet.

With four races remaining, Senna held an 18-point lead over Mansell in the Drivers' Championship, 77 to 59. Patrese was third with 34, followed by Berger with 31, and Prost with 25. In the Constructors' Championship, McLaren led Williams by 15 points, 108 to 93, with Ferrari a distant third with 39.

=== Race 13: Portugal ===
The Estoril circuit near Lisbon hosted the Portuguese round, and Patrese took pole ahead of Berger, Senna, Mansell, Prost and Alesi. At the start, Mansell sliced across in front of Senna and switched sides to sneak by Berger. The order at the end of lap 1 was: Patrese, Mansell, Berger, Senna, Alesi and Prost.

The Williamses pulled away from the McLarens who were pulling away from the Ferraris (Prost had by now passed Alesi). On lap 18, Patrese waved Mansell through and decided to follow him. The McLarens stopped first and Senna got ahead of Berger. When Mansell stopped on lap 29, his crew had trouble fixing the wheelnut of his right rear properly. As the Williams mechanic went to get a spare nut, the lollipop man, unaware of the trouble signalled for Mansell to depart. Immediately, his right rear fell off and he stopped in the middle of the pitlane. The team retrieved the tyre, fixed it on Mansell's car and sent him on his way but he had dropped to 17th.

At the front, Berger passed Senna and set off after Patrese only for his engine to fail on lap 38. Two laps later, Prost from third went out with the same problem. This put the order as: Patrese, Senna, Alesi, Martini, Capelli and Piquet. On lap 49, Mansell who had charged through the field took sixth from his former arch-rival Piquet and was only 15 seconds from third place. Then, on lap 51, he was shown the black disqualification flag for the pit-lane infringement. Capelli spun off on lap 65 from fifth. Patrese won from Senna, Alesi, Martini, Piquet and Schumacher.

=== Race 14: Spain ===
The Spanish Grand Prix had moved from the Jerez circuit near Seville to the brand-new Catalunya circuit in Montmeló, near Barcelona, on the other side of Spain. Berger took pole in Spain ahead of Mansell, Senna, Patrese, Schumacher and Prost. At the start, it was damp and Senna blasted past Mansell while Patrese messed up again, dropping to sixth. Midway through the lap, Schumacher passed Mansell to take third. The order was: Berger, Senna, Schumacher, Mansell, Prost and Patrese.

Mansell repassed Schumacher near the end of the second lap and set off after Senna. On lap 5, Mansell and Senna went side by side down the main straight but Mansell was ahead as he had the inside line. As the track dried, everyone stopped and Berger's stop was slow. Senna's stop was quick and he took the lead ahead of Berger, Mansell, Prost, Schumacher and Patrese. Senna then let Berger through on lap 12 in order to hold up Mansell while Schumacher overtook Prost at the same time. Then, Senna spun into the last corner and dropped behind Mansell, Schumacher and Prost.

Mansell quickly reeled in Berger and got ahead on lap 20 and proceeded to pull away. Schumacher now came to attack Berger and when he tried, he messed up and spun off. He rejoined back down in sixth. On lap 33, Berger slowed down with electrical troubles and retired. Soon afterwards, Patrese passed Senna for third. Schumacher had blistered his tyres in the spin and pitted, dropping behind Alesi who charged forward and passed Senna. Mansell crucially won from Prost, Patrese, Alesi, Senna and Schumacher.

With two races to go, Senna led Mansell by 16 points in the Drivers' Championship, 85 to 69, with only a maximum of 20 points still available. Patrese was third with 48, while Prost and Berger both had 31. The Constructors' Championship was much closer with Williams leading McLaren by one point, 117 to 116, while Ferrari was third with 52.

=== Race 15: Japan ===
At the challenging Suzuka circuit in Japan, the McLarens took 1–2 in qualifying with Berger ahead of Senna, Mansell, Prost, Patrese and Alesi. At the start, Berger got away well and Senna blocked Mansell while behind them Patrese got by Prost. Alesi did not last long, his engine failing even before finishing the lap. The order was: Berger, Senna, Mansell, Patrese, Prost and Martini.

Senna let Berger pull away and then held up Mansell, who had to win to keep his World Championship hopes alive. Mansell was frustrated at seeing Berger pull away and hounded Senna in the hope that Senna would make a mistake. However, it was Mansell who made a mistake first, spinning off in a cloud of smoke at the start of lap 10 as he was having brake problems. He was out and Senna was World Champion for the third time.

The McLaren team told Berger to let Senna through and thus protect him with the promise that Senna will let him back ahead on the last lap if they stay 1–2. There were no changes after the stops and the order stayed as: Senna, Berger, Patrese, Prost, Martini and Schumacher. At the front, Senna and Berger traded fastest laps. On lap 29, well behind Schumacher passed Martini for fifth. Nakajima in the second Tyrrell spun off at the S Curves and hit the tyre barrier in the gravel trap by lap 31 (Nakajima was unhurt). However, Schumacher's engine failed on lap 35, giving the place back to Martini. Martini only held it for five more laps before his clutch failed, forcing him to retire.

Nothing then changed afterwards, and Senna kept McLaren's agreement with Berger, by letting Berger through to win on the last lap. Berger won ahead of the successfully defending world champion Senna, Patrese, Prost, Martin Brundle and Modena. The McLaren Honda 1–2 also meant that they were now 11 points ahead of Williams Renault and had a grip on the Constructors' Championship.

=== Race 16: Australia ===
Before the final race at the street circuit in Adelaide, Australia, Prost was fired from the Ferrari team because he made some scathing comments about the team and described his car as a 'truck' when his shock absorbers failed, and the Ferrari team as unwilling to work with him during a press conference for the Japanese Grand Prix. He was replaced by Ferrari test driver Gianni Morbidelli (who had been driving for Minardi). Although the Drivers' Championship had already been decided, the Constructors' Championship had not – this was still being disputed by the McLaren and Williams teams.

In qualifying, McLaren took 1–2 ahead of the Williamses and the Benettons with Senna ahead of Berger, Mansell, Patrese, Piquet, and Schumacher. At the start, in extremely torrential wet conditions, Patrese lost time and was quickly behind Piquet and Alesi had also got by him and Schumacher. Senna led from Berger, Mansell, Piquet, Alesi and Patrese. On lap 3, Berger went wide allowing Mansell to be second and thus go after Senna. He was close enough on lap 5 and was side by side with Senna on the next lap but saw yellow flags because of Nicola Larini's crash. Thus he was forced to back off and Senna retained the lead. Alesi spun off immediately and was followed there by Schumacher. Both were out.

Then, on lap 8, Pierluigi Martini spun off into the wall and his front wing, which separated from his car, was hit by Patrese and got stuck in Patrese's undertray. At the front, Mansell was no longer attacking Senna but Senna was unable to pull away. The conditions became better but after another seven laps, the weather started to become worse and more drivers began to spin off, including Mansell who smashed into a wall- which allowed McLaren to win the Constructors' Championship. Berger also spun off twice on the next lap as Senna gestured to the marshals to try to get the race stopped. Patrese followed suit and finally it was stopped after Senna had finished lap 16. However, the officials had decided to count the results back 2 laps to lap 14 which meant that Senna won from Mansell, Berger, Piquet, Patrese and Morbidelli. Only half points were awarded because the race was stopped before 75% of the distance was over. This particular Grand Prix set a record as the shortest Grand Prix ever run until the 2021 Belgian Grand Prix at Spa which only lasted 3 laps, all behind the safety car on 29 August 2021.

Because only half points were awarded in Australia, at the end of the season, Senna was the world champion with 96 points with Mansell second with 72, Patrese third with 53, Berger fourth with 43, Prost fifth with 34, Piquet sixth with 26.5, Alesi seventh with 21 and Modena eighth with 10. In the Constructors' Championship, McLaren-Honda was the World Champion with 139 points, with Williams-Renault second with 125, Ferrari third with 55.5, and Benetton-Ford fourth with 38.5.

The 1991 season was to be the last in which Ayrton Senna, Alain Prost, Nigel Mansell and Nelson Piquet competed together, the four drivers having between them won 93 of the 112 Grands Prix since 1985 and all seven Drivers' Championships during this period. Piquet retired from F1 at season's end, while Prost decided to take a sabbatical in 1992. Mansell would win the Drivers' Championship in 1992 and then leave F1 for CART; Prost would win the championship in 1993 and then retire; and Senna would lose his life at the 1994 San Marino Grand Prix.

== Results and standings ==
=== Grands Prix ===
Round	Grand Prix	Pole position	Fastest lap	Winning driver	Winning constructor	Report
1	United States Grand Prix	(Brazil) Ayrton Senna	(France) Jean Alesi	(Brazil) Ayrton Senna	(United Kingdom) McLaren-Honda	Report
2	(Brazil) Brazilian Grand Prix	(Brazil) Ayrton Senna	(United Kingdom) Nigel Mansell	(Brazil) Ayrton Senna	(United Kingdom) McLaren-Honda	Report
3	(Italy) San Marino Grand Prix	(Brazil) Ayrton Senna	(Austria) Gerhard Berger	(Brazil) Ayrton Senna	(United Kingdom) McLaren-Honda	Report
4	Monaco Grand Prix	(Brazil) Ayrton Senna	(France) Alain Prost	(Brazil) Ayrton Senna	(United Kingdom) McLaren-Honda	Report
5	(Canada) Canadian Grand Prix	(Italy) Riccardo Patrese	(United Kingdom) Nigel Mansell	(Brazil) Nelson Piquet	(United Kingdom) Benetton-Ford	Report
6	(Mexico) Mexican Grand Prix	(Italy) Riccardo Patrese	(United Kingdom) Nigel Mansell	(Italy) Riccardo Patrese	(United Kingdom) Williams-Renault	Report
7	(France) French Grand Prix	(Italy) Riccardo Patrese	(United Kingdom) Nigel Mansell	(United Kingdom) Nigel Mansell	(United Kingdom) Williams-Renault	Report
8	(United Kingdom) British Grand Prix	(United Kingdom) Nigel Mansell	(United Kingdom) Nigel Mansell	(United Kingdom) Nigel Mansell	(United Kingdom) Williams-Renault	Report
9	(Germany) German Grand Prix	(United Kingdom) Nigel Mansell	(Italy) Riccardo Patrese	(United Kingdom) Nigel Mansell	(United Kingdom) Williams-Renault	Report
10	(Hungary) Hungarian Grand Prix	(Brazil) Ayrton Senna	(Belgium) Bertrand Gachot	(Brazil) Ayrton Senna	(United Kingdom) McLaren-Honda	Report
11	(Belgium) Belgian Grand Prix	(Brazil) Ayrton Senna	(Brazil) Roberto Moreno	(Brazil) Ayrton Senna	(United Kingdom) McLaren-Honda	Report
12	(Italy) Italian Grand Prix	(Brazil) Ayrton Senna	(Brazil) Ayrton Senna	(United Kingdom) Nigel Mansell	(United Kingdom) Williams-Renault	Report
13	(Portugal) Portuguese Grand Prix	(Italy) Riccardo Patrese	(United Kingdom) Nigel Mansell	(Italy) Riccardo Patrese	(United Kingdom) Williams-Renault	Report
14	(Spain) Spanish Grand Prix	(Austria) Gerhard Berger	(Italy) Riccardo Patrese	(United Kingdom) Nigel Mansell	(United Kingdom) Williams-Renault	Report
15	(Japan) Japanese Grand Prix	(Austria) Gerhard Berger	(Brazil) Ayrton Senna	(Austria) Gerhard Berger	(United Kingdom) McLaren-Honda	Report
16	(Australia) Australian Grand Prix	(Brazil) Ayrton Senna	(Austria) Gerhard Berger	(Brazil) Ayrton Senna	(United Kingdom) McLaren-Honda	Report

=== Scoring system ===
Points were awarded to the top six classified finishers. For the first time, both the Drivers' Championship and the Constructors' Championship counted all rounds towards the points totals.

Points were awarded in the following system:

Position	1st	2nd	3rd	4th	5th	6th
Race	10	6	4	3	2	1

=== World Drivers' Championship standings ===
Pos.	Driver	USA (United States)	BRA (Brazil)	SMR (Italy)	MON (Monaco)	CAN (Canada)	MEX (Mexico)	FRA (France)	GBR (United Kingdom)	GER (Germany)	HUN (Hungary)	BEL (Belgium)	ITA (Italy)	POR (Portugal)	ESP (Spain)	JPN (Japan)	AUS‡ (Australia)	Points
1	(Brazil) Ayrton Senna	1^{P}	1^{P}	1^{P}	1^{P}	Ret	3	3	4^{†}	7^{†}	1^{P}	1^{P}	2^{P}^{F}	2	5	2^{F}	1^{P}	96
2	(United Kingdom) Nigel Mansell	Ret	Ret^{F}	Ret	2	6^{F}^{†}	2^{F}	1^{F}	1^{P}^{F}	1^{P}	2	Ret	1	DSQ^{F}	1	Ret	2	72
3	(Italy) Riccardo Patrese	Ret	2	Ret	Ret	3^{P}	1^{P}	5^{P}	Ret	2^{F}	3	5	Ret	1^{P}	3^{F}	3	5	53
4	(Austria) Gerhard Berger	Ret	3	2^{F}	Ret	Ret	Ret	Ret	2	4	4	2	4	Ret	Ret^{P}	1^{P}	3^{F}	43
5	(France) Alain Prost	2	4	DNS	5^{F}	Ret	Ret	2	3	Ret	Ret	Ret	3	Ret	2	4		34
6	(Brazil) Nelson Piquet	3	5	Ret	Ret	1	Ret	8	5	Ret	Ret	3	6	5	11	7	4	26.5
7	(France) Jean Alesi	12^{F}^{†}	6	Ret	3	Ret	Ret	4	Ret	3	5	Ret	Ret	3	4	Ret	Ret	21
8	(Italy) Stefano Modena	4	Ret	Ret	Ret	2	11	Ret	7	13	12	Ret	Ret	Ret	16	6	10	10
9	(Italy) Andrea de Cesaris	DNPQ	Ret	Ret	Ret	4	4	6	Ret	5	7	13^{†}	7	8	Ret	Ret	8	9
10	(Brazil) Roberto Moreno	Ret	7	13^{†}	4	Ret	5	Ret	Ret	8	8	4^{F}	Ret	10			16	8
11	(Italy) Pierluigi Martini	9^{†}	Ret	4	12	7	Ret	9	9	Ret	Ret	12^{†}	Ret	4	13	Ret	Ret	6
12	(Finland) JJ Lehto	Ret	Ret	3	11	Ret	Ret	Ret	13	Ret	Ret	Ret	Ret	Ret	8	Ret	12	4
13	(Belgium) Bertrand Gachot	10^{†}	13^{†}	Ret	8	5	Ret	Ret	6	6	9^{F}						DNQ	4
14	(Germany) Michael Schumacher											Ret	5	6	6	Ret	Ret	4
15	(Japan) Satoru Nakajima	5	Ret	Ret	Ret	10	12	Ret	8	Ret	15	Ret	Ret	13	17	Ret	Ret	2
16	(Finland) Mika Häkkinen	Ret	9	5	Ret	Ret	9	DNQ	12	Ret	14	Ret	14	14	Ret	Ret	19	2
17	(United Kingdom) Martin Brundle	11	12	11	EX	Ret	Ret	Ret	Ret	11	Ret	9	13	12	10	5	DNQ	2
18	(Italy) Emanuele Pirro	Ret	11	DNPQ	6	9	DNPQ	DNPQ	10	10	Ret	8	10	Ret	15	Ret	7	1
19	(United Kingdom) Mark Blundell	Ret	Ret	8	Ret	DNQ	Ret	Ret	Ret	12	Ret	6	12	Ret	Ret	DNPQ	17	1
20	(Italy) Ivan Capelli	Ret	Ret	Ret	Ret	Ret	Ret	Ret	Ret	Ret	6	Ret	8	17^{†}	Ret			1
21	(France) Éric Bernard	Ret	Ret	Ret	9	Ret	6	Ret	Ret	Ret	Ret	Ret	Ret	DNQ	Ret	DNQ		1
22	(Japan) Aguri Suzuki	6	DNS	Ret	Ret	Ret	Ret	Ret	Ret	Ret	Ret	DNQ	DNQ	Ret	DNQ	Ret	DNQ	1
23	(United Kingdom) Julian Bailey	DNQ	DNQ	6	DNQ													1
24	(Italy) Gianni Morbidelli	Ret	8	Ret	Ret	Ret	7	Ret	11	Ret	13	Ret	9	9	14^{†}	Ret	6	0.5
—	(Brazil) Maurício Gugelmin	Ret	Ret	12^{†}	Ret	Ret	Ret	7	Ret	Ret	11	Ret	15	7	7	8	14	0
—	(Belgium) Thierry Boutsen	Ret	10	7	7	Ret	8	12	Ret	9	17^{†}	11	Ret	16	Ret	9	Ret	0
—	(United Kingdom) Johnny Herbert					DNQ	10	10	14^{†}			7		Ret		Ret	11	0
—	(Italy) Nicola Larini	7	DNPQ	DNPQ	DNPQ	DNPQ	DNPQ	DNPQ	DNPQ	Ret	16	DNQ	16	DNQ	DNQ	DNQ	Ret	0
—	(France) Érik Comas	DNQ	Ret	10	10	8	DNQ	11	DNQ	Ret	10	Ret	11	11	Ret	Ret	18	0
—	(Italy) Gabriele Tarquini	8	Ret	DNQ	Ret	DNQ	DNQ	DNQ	DNQ	DNQ	DNPQ	DNPQ	DNPQ	DNQ	12	11	DNPQ	0
—	(Italy) Alessandro Zanardi														9	Ret	9	0
—	(Belgium) Eric van de Poele	DNPQ	DNPQ	9^{†}	DNPQ	DNPQ	DNPQ	DNPQ	DNPQ	DNQ	DNQ	DNQ	DNQ	DNQ	DNQ	DNQ	DNQ	0
—	(Italy) Alex Caffi	DNQ	DNQ	DNQ	DNQ					DNPQ	DNPQ	DNQ	DNPQ	DNPQ	DNPQ	10	15	0
—	(France) Olivier Grouillard	DNPQ	DNPQ	DNPQ	DNPQ	DNPQ	Ret	Ret	DNPQ	DNPQ	DNQ	10	Ret	DNPQ	DNPQ			0
—	(Italy) Michele Alboreto	Ret	DNQ	DNQ	Ret	Ret	Ret	Ret	Ret	DNQ	DNQ	DNPQ	DNQ	15	Ret	DNQ	13	0
—	(Austria) Karl Wendlinger															Ret	20	0
—	(Sweden) Stefan Johansson	DNQ	DNQ			Ret	DNQ	DNQ	DNQ									0
—	(Italy) Fabrizio Barbazza			DNQ	DNQ	DNQ	DNQ	DNQ	DNQ	DNPQ	DNPQ	DNPQ	DNPQ	DNPQ	DNPQ			0
—	(Germany) Michael Bartels									DNQ	DNQ		DNQ		DNQ			0
—	(Portugal) Pedro Chaves	DNPQ	DNPQ	DNPQ	DNPQ	DNPQ	DNPQ	DNPQ	DNPQ	DNPQ	DNPQ	DNPQ	DNPQ	DNPQ				0
—	(Japan) Naoki Hattori															DNPQ	DNPQ	0
Pos.	Driver	USA (United States)	BRA (Brazil)	SMR (Italy)	MON (Monaco)	CAN (Canada)	MEX (Mexico)	FRA (France)	GBR (United Kingdom)	GER (Germany)	HUN (Hungary)	BEL (Belgium)	ITA (Italy)	POR (Portugal)	ESP (Spain)	JPN (Japan)	AUS‡ (Australia)	Points

Key
Colour	Result
Gold	Winner
Silver	Second place
Bronze	Third place
Green	Other points position
Blue	Other classified position
Blue	Not classified, finished (NC)
Purple	Not classified, retired (Ret)
Red	Did not qualify (DNQ)
Red	Did not pre-qualify (DNPQ)
Black	Disqualified (DSQ)
White	Did not start (DNS)
White	Race cancelled (C)
Blank	Did not practice (DNP)
Blank	Excluded (EX)
Blank	Did not arrive (DNA)
Blank	Withdrawn (WD)
Blank	Did not enter (empty cell)
Annotation	Meaning
P	Pole position
F	Fastest lap
†	Did not finish, but classified for completing over 90% of the race distance

Notes:

- † – Driver did not finish the Grand Prix but was classified, as he completed more than 90% of the race distance.
- ‡ – Half points were awarded at the Australian Grand Prix as less than 75% of the scheduled distance was completed.

=== World Constructors' Championship standings ===
Pos.	Constructor	No.	USA (United States)	BRA (Brazil)	SMR (Italy)	MON (Monaco)	CAN (Canada)	MEX (Mexico)	FRA (France)	GBR (United Kingdom)	GER (Germany)	HUN (Hungary)	BEL (Belgium)	ITA (Italy)	POR (Portugal)	ESP (Spain)	JPN (Japan)	AUS^{‡} (Australia)	Points
1	(United Kingdom) McLaren-Honda	1	1^{P}	1^{P}	1^{P}	1^{P}	Ret	3	3	4^{†}	7^{†}	1^{P}	1^{P}	2^{P}^{F}	2	5	2^{F}	1^{P}	139
1	(United Kingdom) McLaren-Honda	2	Ret	3	2^{F}	Ret	Ret	Ret	Ret	2	4	4	2	4	Ret	Ret^{P}	1^{P}	3^{F}	139
2	(United Kingdom) Williams-Renault	5	Ret	Ret^{F}	Ret	2	6^{F}^{†}	2^{F}	1^{F}	1^{P}^{F}	1^{P}	2	Ret	1	DSQ^{F}	1	Ret	2	125
2	(United Kingdom) Williams-Renault	6	Ret	2	Ret	Ret	3^{P}	1^{P}	5^{P}	Ret	2^{F}	3	5	Ret	1^{P}	3^{F}	3	5	125
3	(Italy) Ferrari	27	2	4	DNS	5^{F}	Ret	Ret	2	3	Ret	Ret	Ret	3	Ret	2	4	6	55.5
3	(Italy) Ferrari	28	12^{F}^{†}	6	Ret	3	Ret	Ret	4	Ret	3	5	Ret	Ret	3	4	Ret	Ret	55.5
4	(United Kingdom) Benetton-Ford	19	Ret	7	13^{†}	4	Ret	5	Ret	Ret	8	8	4^{F}	5	6	6	Ret	Ret	38.5
4	(United Kingdom) Benetton-Ford	20	3	5	Ret	Ret	1	Ret	8	5	Ret	Ret	3	6	5	11	7	4	38.5
5	(Republic of Ireland) Jordan-Ford	32	10^{†}	13^{†}	Ret	8	5	Ret	Ret	6	6	9^{F}	Ret	Ret	10	9	Ret	9	13
5	(Republic of Ireland) Jordan-Ford	33	DNPQ	Ret	Ret	Ret	4	4	6	Ret	5	7	13^{†}	7	8	Ret	Ret	8	13
6	(United Kingdom) Tyrrell-Honda	3	5	Ret	Ret	Ret	10	12	Ret	8	Ret	15	Ret	Ret	13	17	Ret	Ret	12
6	(United Kingdom) Tyrrell-Honda	4	4	Ret	Ret	Ret	2	11	Ret	7	13	12	Ret	Ret	Ret	16	6	10	12
7	(Italy) Minardi-Ferrari	23	9^{†}	Ret	4	12	7	Ret	9	9	Ret	Ret	12^{†}	Ret	4	13	Ret	Ret	6
7	(Italy) Minardi-Ferrari	24	Ret	8	Ret	Ret	Ret	7	Ret	11	Ret	13	Ret	9	9	14	Ret	16	6
8	(Italy) Dallara-Judd	21	Ret	11	DNPQ	6	9	DNPQ	DNPQ	10	10	Ret	8	10	Ret	15	Ret	7	5
8	(Italy) Dallara-Judd	22	Ret	Ret	3	11	Ret	Ret	Ret	13	Ret	Ret	Ret	Ret	Ret	8	Ret	12	5
9	(United Kingdom) Lotus-Judd	11	Ret	9	5	Ret	Ret	9	DNQ	12	Ret	14	Ret	14	14	Ret	Ret	19	3
9	(United Kingdom) Lotus-Judd	12	DNQ	DNQ	6	DNQ	DNQ	10	10	14^{†}	DNQ	DNQ	7	DNQ	Ret	DNQ	Ret	11	3
10	(United Kingdom) Brabham-Yamaha	7	11	12	11	EX	Ret	Ret	Ret	Ret	11	Ret	9	13	12	10	5	DNQ	3
10	(United Kingdom) Brabham-Yamaha	8	Ret	Ret	8	Ret	DNQ	Ret	Ret	Ret	12	Ret	6	12	Ret	Ret	DNPQ	17	3
11	(United Kingdom) Lola-Ford	29	Ret	Ret	Ret	9	Ret	6	Ret	Ret	Ret	Ret	Ret	Ret	DNQ	Ret	DNQ	DNQ	2
11	(United Kingdom) Lola-Ford	30	6	DNS	Ret	Ret	Ret	Ret	Ret	Ret	Ret	Ret	DNQ	DNQ	Ret	DNQ	Ret	DNQ	2
12	(United Kingdom) Leyton House-Ilmor	15	Ret	Ret	12^{†}	Ret	Ret	Ret	7	Ret	Ret	11	Ret	15	7	7	8	14	1
12	(United Kingdom) Leyton House-Ilmor	16	Ret	Ret	Ret	Ret	Ret	Ret	Ret	Ret	Ret	6	Ret	8	17	Ret	Ret	20	1
13	(France) Ligier-Lamborghini	25	Ret	10	7	7	Ret	8	12	Ret	9	17^{†}	11	Ret	16	Ret	9	Ret	0
13	(France) Ligier-Lamborghini	26	DNQ	Ret	10	10	8	DNQ	11	DNQ	Ret	10	Ret	11	11	Ret	Ret	18	0
14	(Italy) Lambo-Lamborghini	34	7	DNPQ	DNPQ	DNPQ	DNPQ	DNPQ	DNPQ	DNPQ	Ret	16	DNQ	16	DNQ	DNQ	DNQ	Ret	0
14	(Italy) Lambo-Lamborghini	35	DNPQ	DNPQ	9^{†}	DNPQ	DNPQ	DNPQ	DNPQ	DNPQ	DNQ	DNQ	DNQ	DNQ	DNQ	DNQ	DNQ	DNQ	0
15	(France) AGS-Ford	17	8	Ret	DNQ	Ret	DNQ	DNQ	DNQ	DNQ	DNQ	DNPQ	DNPQ	DNPQ	DNQ	DNPQ			0
15	(France) AGS-Ford	18	DNQ	DNQ	DNQ	DNQ	DNQ	DNQ	DNQ	DNQ	DNPQ	DNPQ	DNPQ	DNPQ	DNPQ	DNPQ			0
16	(Italy) Fondmetal-Ford	14	DNPQ	DNPQ	DNPQ	DNPQ	DNPQ	Ret	Ret	DNPQ	DNPQ	DNQ	10	Ret	DNPQ	12	11	DNPQ	0
17	(United Kingdom) Footwork-Ford	9							Ret	Ret	DNQ	DNQ	DNPQ	DNQ	15	Ret	DNQ	13	0
17	(United Kingdom) Footwork-Ford	10							DNQ	DNQ	DNPQ	DNPQ	DNQ	DNPQ	DNPQ	DNPQ	10	15	0
−	(United Kingdom) Footwork-Porsche	9	Ret	DNQ	DNQ	Ret	Ret	Ret											0
−	(United Kingdom) Footwork-Porsche	10	DNQ	DNQ	DNQ	DNQ	Ret	DNQ											0
−	(Italy) Coloni-Ford	31	DNPQ	DNPQ	DNPQ	DNPQ	DNPQ	DNPQ	DNPQ	DNPQ	DNPQ	DNPQ	DNPQ	DNPQ	DNPQ		DNPQ	DNPQ	0
Pos.	Constructor	No.	USA (United States)	BRA (Brazil)	SMR (Italy)	MON (Monaco)	CAN (Canada)	MEX (Mexico)	FRA (France)	GBR (United Kingdom)	GER (Germany)	HUN (Hungary)	BEL (Belgium)	ITA (Italy)	POR (Portugal)	ESP (Spain)	JPN (Japan)	AUS^{‡} (Australia)	Points

Notes:

- † – Driver did not finish the Grand Prix but was classified, as he completed more than 90% of the race distance.
- ‡ – Half points were awarded at the Australian Grand Prix as less than 75% of the scheduled distance was completed.

== Non-championship event results ==
The 1991 season also included a single event which did not count towards the World Championship, the Formula One Indoor Trophy at the Bologna Motor Show.

Race name	Venue	Date	Winning driver	Constructor	Report
(Italy) Formula One Indoor Trophy	Bologna Motor Show	7–8 December	(Italy) Gabriele Tarquini	(Italy) Fondmetal	Report
