= Arrows A11 =

Formula One Car

Arrows A11 Arrows A11B Footwork A11C
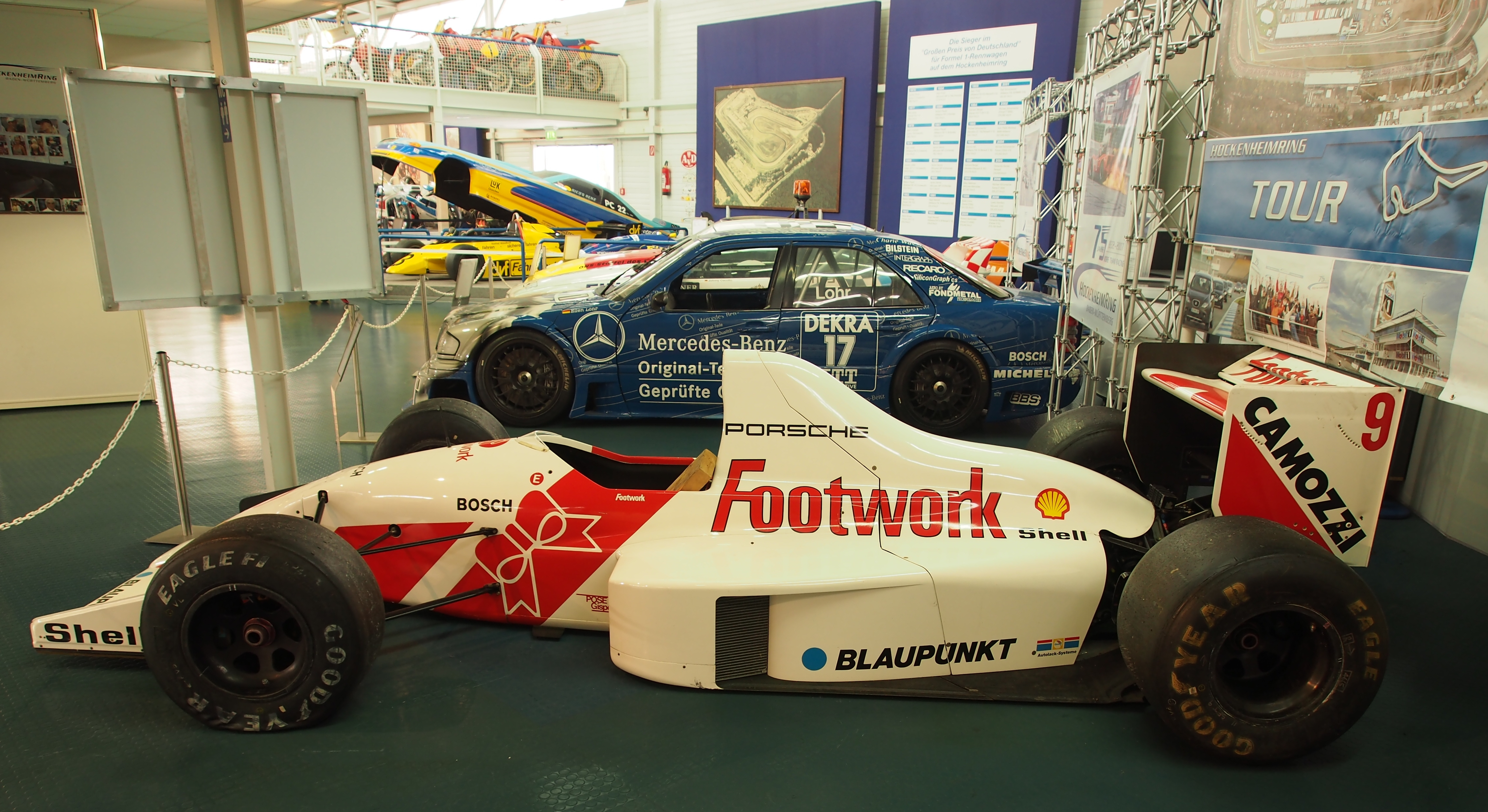
- A 1991 A11C of Michele Alboreto
- Category: Formula One
- Constructor: Arrows
- Designers: Ross Brawn (Technical Director); James Robinson; Paul Bowen (Project Engineer)
- Predecessor: A10B
- Successor: FA12

Technical specifications
- Chassis: Carbon fibre and kevlar monocoque
- Engine: 1989-1990: mid-engine, longitudinally mounted, 3,493 cc (213.2 cu in), Ford DFR, 90° V8, NA; 1991: mid-engine, longitudinally mounted, 3,499 cc (213.5 cu in), Porsche 3512, 80° V12, NA
- Transmission: Arrows / Hewland; 1989-1990: 5-speed manual
- Fuel: 1989 Mobil; 1990 Elf; 1991 Shell
- Tyres: Goodyear

Competition history
- Notable entrants: Arrows Grand Prix International; Footwork Arrows Racing
- Notable drivers: 9. (United Kingdom) Derek Warwick; 10. (United States) Eddie Cheever; 9. (Italy) Michele Alboreto; 10. (Germany) Bernd Schneider; 10. (Italy) Alex Caffi
- Debut: 1989 Brazilian Grand Prix
- Last event: 1991 San Marino Grand Prix
Races	Wins	Podiums	Poles	F/Laps
35	0	1	0	0
- Constructors' Championships: 0
- Drivers' Championships: 0

The Arrows A11 was a Formula One car with which the Arrows team competed in the 1989 and 1990 Formula One seasons, and at the start of the 1991 season (badged as a Footwork).

Designed by Ross Brawn, the A11 was the first Arrows car following the ban on turbocharged engines at the end of 1988, being fitted with a normally-aspirated 3.5-litre Ford Cosworth DFR V8 engine. It was raced to reasonably good effect by Derek Warwick and Eddie Cheever in 1989, Warwick finishing in the top six on five occasions and briefly challenging for victory in the Canadian Grand Prix, and Cheever finishing third in the United States Grand Prix, held in his home town of Phoenix, Arizona. With 13 points, Arrows placed seventh in the Constructors' Championship.

For 1990, the car received minor suspension upgrades and became the A11B, while Italian drivers Michele Alboreto and Alex Caffi replaced Warwick and Cheever. 1990 turned out to be far less successful than 1989, however, as the car failed to qualify seven times, and finished in the top six only once, when Caffi took fifth at an attritional race in Monaco. Caffi was also forced to sit out the United States and Spanish races through injury, Germany's Bernd Schneider deputising on both occasions. The two points from Monaco gave Arrows ninth in the Constructors' Championship.

By the start of 1991, the team had been taken over by the Japanese Footwork concern and renamed accordingly, and had also secured a deal to run Porsche V12 engines, replacing the Fords. However, the team's car for that season, the FA12, had to be redesigned when it was discovered that the large Porsche engine, the 3512, could not fit into it. The team therefore modified the A11B into the A11C to accommodate this engine, and used it in the first two races, as well as at San Marino after Alboreto destroyed his redesigned FA12 during practice. From these five attempts, the ageing car qualified only once (Alboreto in the United States), before being finally retired.

== Complete Formula One World Championship results ==
(key)

Year	Entrant	Chassis	Engine	Tyres	Drivers	1	2	3	4	5	6	7	8	9	10	11	12	13	14	15	16	Points	WCC
1989	Arrows Grand Prix International	Arrows A11	Ford DFR V8	G		BRA	SMR	MON	MEX	USA	CAN	FRA	GBR	GER	HUN	BEL	ITA	POR	ESP	JPN	AUS	13	7th
1989	Arrows Grand Prix International	Arrows A11	Ford DFR V8	G	Derek Warwick	5	5	Ret	Ret	Ret	Ret		9	6	10	6	Ret	Ret	9	6	Ret	13	7th
1989	Arrows Grand Prix International	Arrows A11	Ford DFR V8	G	Martin Donnelly							12										13	7th
1989	Arrows Grand Prix International	Arrows A11	Ford DFR V8	G	Eddie Cheever	Ret	9	7	7	3	Ret	7	DNQ	12	5	Ret	DNQ	Ret	Ret	8	Ret	13	7th
1990	Arrows Grand Prix International	Arrows A11; Arrows A11B	Ford DFR V8	G		USA	BRA	SMR	MON	CAN	MEX	FRA	GBR	GER	HUN	BEL	ITA	POR	ESP	JPN	AUS	2	9th
1990	Arrows Grand Prix International	Arrows A11; Arrows A11B	Ford DFR V8	G	Michele Alboreto	10	Ret	DNQ	DNQ	Ret	17	10	Ret	Ret	12	13	12	9	10	Ret	DNQ	2	9th
1990	Arrows Grand Prix International	Arrows A11; Arrows A11B	Ford DFR V8	G	Bernd Schneider	12													DNQ			2	9th
1990	Arrows Grand Prix International	Arrows A11; Arrows A11B	Ford DFR V8	G	Alex Caffi		Ret	DNQ	5	8	DNQ	Ret	7	9	9	10	9	13		9	DNQ	2	9th
1991	Footwork Arrows Racing	Footwork A11C	Porsche 3512 V12	G		USA	BRA	SMR	MON	CAN	MEX	FRA	GBR	GER	HUN	BEL	ITA	POR	ESP	JPN	AUS	0	-
1991	Footwork Arrows Racing	Footwork A11C	Porsche 3512 V12	G	Alex Caffi	DNQ	DNQ															0	-
1991	Footwork Arrows Racing	Footwork A11C	Porsche 3512 V12	G	Michele Alboreto	Ret	DNQ	DNQ														0	-
