= Footwork FA12 =

Formula One Car

Footwork FA12 Footwork FA12C
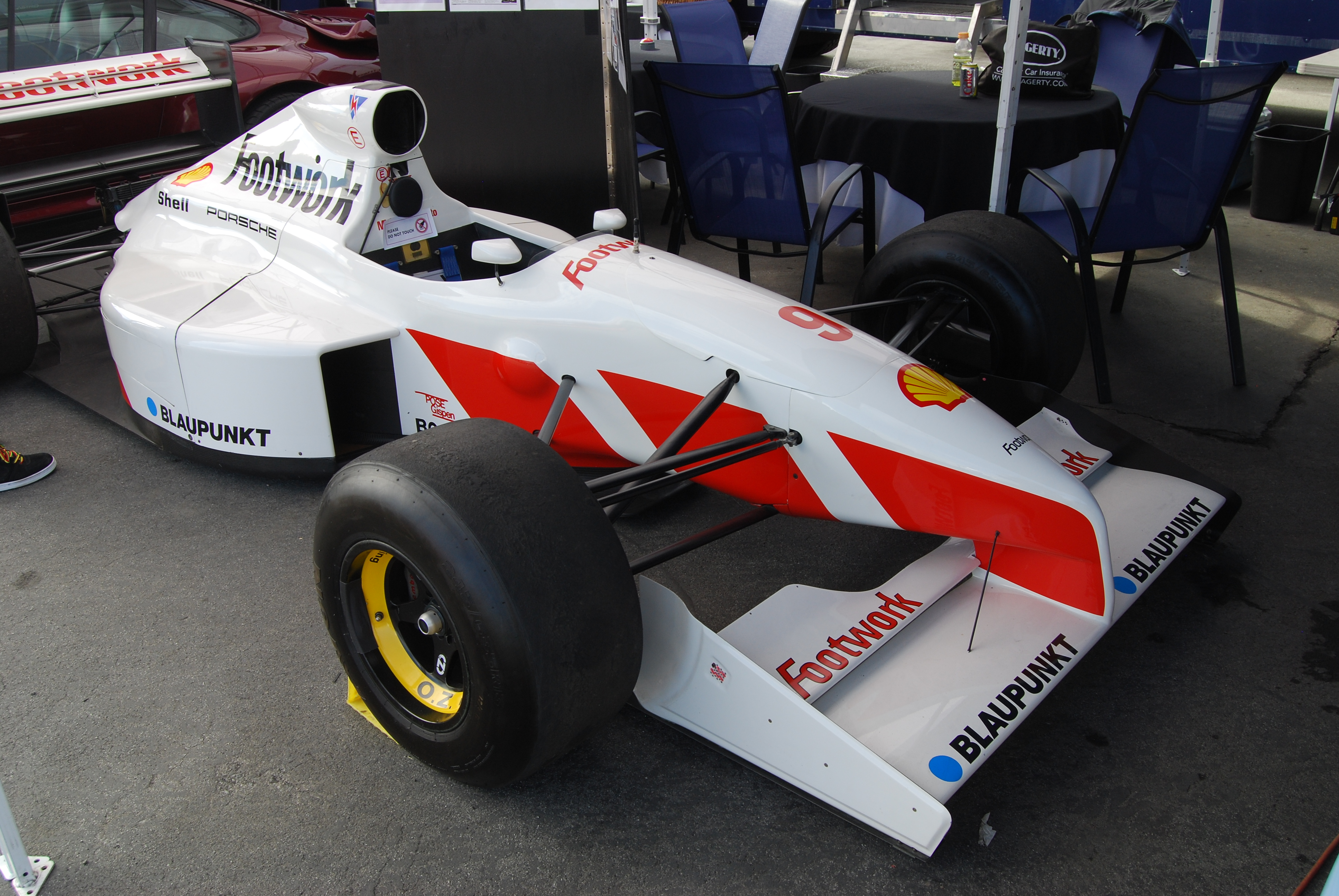
- Category: Formula One
- Constructor: Footwork Arrows
- Designers: Alan Jenkins (Technical Director); Dave Amey (Chief Designer)
- Predecessor: Arrows A11C
- Successor: FA13

Technical specifications
- Chassis: Carbon fibre and Kevlar monocoque
- Engine: FA12: mid-engine, longitudinally-mounted, 3,499 cc (213.5 cu in), Porsche 3512, 80° V12, NA; FA12C: mid-engine, longitudinally-mounted, 3,493 cc (213.2 cu in), Ford DFR, 90° V8, NA
- Transmission: Hewland Transverse 6-speed semi-automatic
- Power: 680 hp @ 13,000 rpm (FA12 Porsche V-12), 620-630 hp @ 11,250 rpm (FA12C Ford-Cosworth V-8)
- Fuel: Shell
- Tyres: Goodyear

Competition history
- Notable entrants: Footwork Grand Prix International
- Notable drivers: 9. (Italy) Michele Alboreto; 10. (Italy) Alex Caffi; 10. (Sweden) Stefan Johansson
- Debut: 1991 San Marino Grand Prix
- Last event: 1991 Australian Grand Prix
Races	Wins	Poles	F/Laps
14	0	0	0
- Constructors' Championships: 0
- Drivers' Championships: 0

The Footwork FA12 was a Formula One car designed and built by the Footwork Arrows team for the 1991 season. The number 9 car was driven by Michele Alboreto and the number 10 car was shared by Alex Caffi and Stefan Johansson. The team had no test driver.

The FA12 was intended to start the season, but the new Porsche 3512 engine was so large and bulky that the car had to be re-designed to install it properly, so a 1990-based car called the A11C was used for the first three race meetings.

The FA12 finally debuted at the San Marino Grand Prix, where Caffi failed to qualify the new car (Alboreto still had an A11C). For the following Monaco Grand Prix both drivers had FA12s - Caffi once again failed to qualify and Alboreto retired from the race. Stefan Johansson replaced Caffi at the Canadian Grand Prix after Caffi sustained injuries in a road accident; this time both drivers qualified but both also retired from the race. The Mexican Grand Prix was the last appearance of the Porsche engine; Johansson failed to qualify and Alboreto again retired from the race.

Before the next race in France, the team switched to the Ford-Cosworth DFR 3.5-litre, V8 engine, in a modified version of the car designated the FA12C. But results were not much better; the last 10 races of the season yielded only 7 starts and 4 finishes, with a best placing of 10th.

== Complete Formula One results ==
(key)

Year	Entrant	Chassis	Engine	Tyres	Driver	1	2	3	4	5	6	7	8	9	10	11	12	13	14	15	16	Pts.	WCC
1991	Footwork Arrows	FA12	Porsche 3512; V12	G		USA	BRA	SMR	MON	CAN	MEX	FRA	GBR	GER	HUN	BEL	ITA	POR	ESP	JPN	AUS	0	NC
1991	Footwork Arrows	FA12	Porsche 3512; V12	G	Michele Alboreto				Ret	Ret	Ret											0	NC
1991	Footwork Arrows	FA12	Porsche 3512; V12	G	Alex Caffi			DNQ	DNQ													0	NC
1991	Footwork Arrows	FA12	Porsche 3512; V12	G	Stefan Johansson					Ret	DNQ											0	NC
1991	Footwork Arrows	FA12C	Ford DFR; V8	G	Michele Alboreto							Ret	Ret	DNQ	DNQ	DNPQ	DNQ	15	Ret	DNQ	13	0	NC
1991	Footwork Arrows	FA12C	Ford DFR; V8	G	Stefan Johansson							DNQ	DNQ									0	NC
1991	Footwork Arrows	FA12C	Ford DFR; V8	G	Alex Caffi									DNPQ	DNPQ	DNQ	DNPQ	DNPQ	DNPQ	10	15	0	NC
