= Alex Caffi =

Italian racing driver (born 1964)

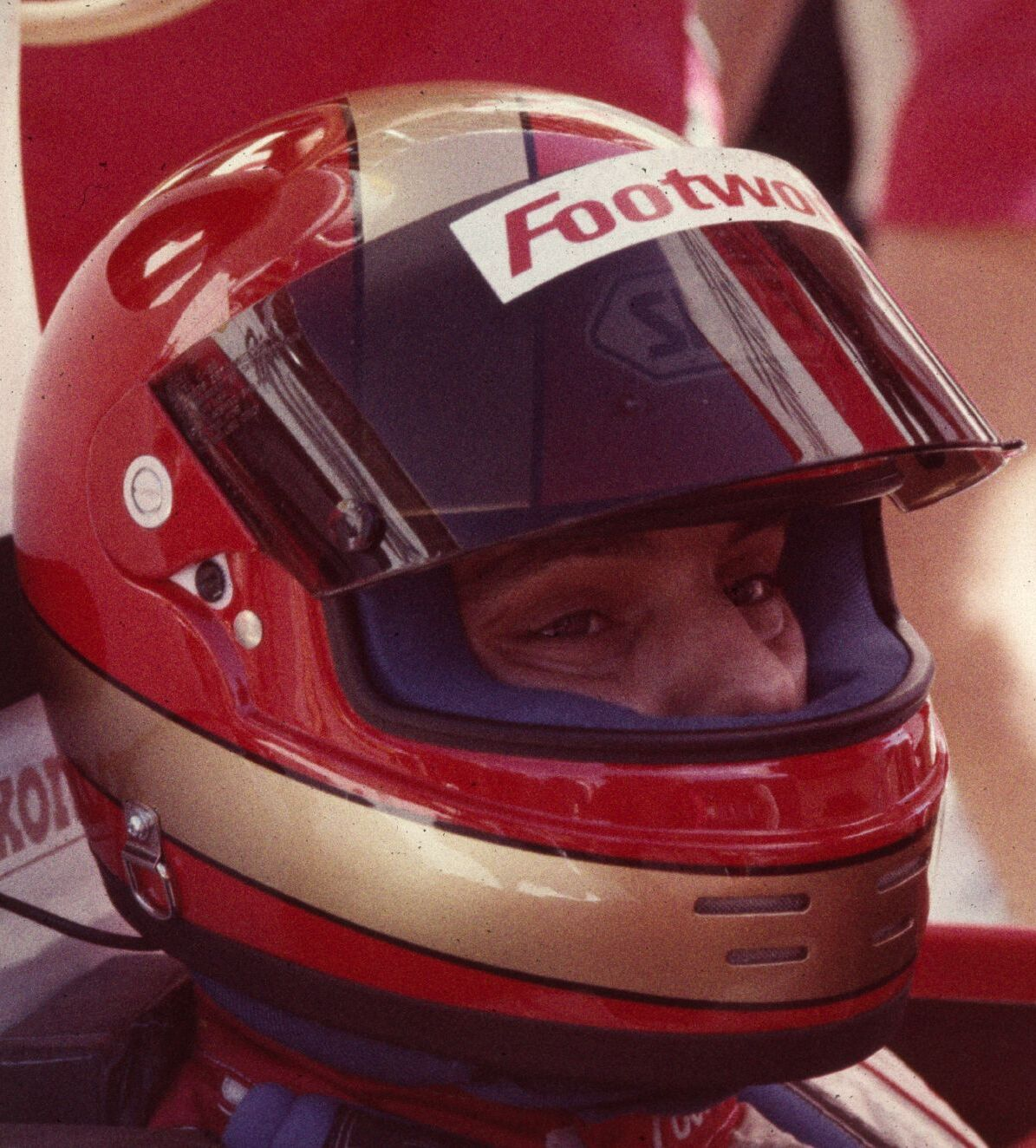
- Caffi at the 1991 United States Grand Prix
- Born: Alessandro Giuseppe Caffi; 18 March 1964 (age 62); Rovato, Brescia, Italy

Formula One World Championship career
- Nationality: (Italy) Italian
- Active years: 1986–1992
- Team(s): Osella, Scuderia Italia, Arrows, Footwork, Andrea Moda
- Entries: 77 (56 starts)
- Championships: 0
- Wins: 0
- Podiums: 0
- Career points: 6
- Pole positions: 0
- Fastest laps: 0
- First entry: 1986 Italian Grand Prix
- Last entry: 1992 Mexican Grand Prix

24 Hours of Le Mans career
- Years: 1999, 2004, 2007
- Teams: Courage, Seikel, Spyker
- Best finish: 6th (1999)
- Class wins: 0

Alessandro Giuseppe "Alex" Caffi (born 18 March 1964) is an Italian racing driver and motorsport executive, who competed in Formula One from 1986 to 1992.

Caffi participated in 75 Grands Prix, debuting on 7 September 1986. In 2006, he raced in the Grand Prix Masters series for retired Formula One drivers. He currently serves as the team owner of Academy Motorsport in the NASCAR Euro Series, and acted as an owner-driver whilst it operated as Alex Caffi Motorsport.

== Early life ==
Alessandro Giuseppe Caffi was born on 18 March 1964 in Rovato, Brescia, Northern Italy. He spent three years in Italian Formula Three from 1984 to 1986, finishing runner-up in 1984 and 1985, then third in 1986. In 1985 he was also the winner of the FIA European Formula 3 Cup.

== Formula One career ==
=== 1980s ===
1986

Caffi was handed his Formula One debut by Osella, at his, and the team's home race, the Italian Grand Prix, in place of Canadian Allen Berg. Qualifying 27th and last in his FA1H (because of a quirk where for this race, and the following one in Portugal, 27 cars were allowed to start) Caffi drove sensibly and steadily to stay out of trouble and come home last of the runners, albeit six laps down and unclassified.

1987

Osella were impressed by caffi's sensible approach, and signed him for a full season in 1987. The Alfa Romeo-powered FA1I was uncompetitive and unreliable; Caffi finished no races out of 16 and failed to qualify twice, though he was classified once. At the opening round, the Brazilian Grand Prix, Caffi retired after 21 laps due to exhaustion as the heat and physically demanding nature of the car proved too much.

The San Marino Grand Prix, three weeks later, provided Caffi with his only classification of the year, 12th, despite running out of fuel five laps from the finish. Then came a run of 10 consecutive retirements; in Belgium, Monaco, where he qualified an excellent 16th and ran as high as tenth, the United States, where he qualified 19th, France, Great Britain, Germany, Hungary, Austria, Italy and Portugal.

As the season drew to a close, Caffi failed to qualify for two of the final four races in Spain and Australia, bookending retirements in Mexico, where he ran as high as seventh due to attrition, and Japan where he ran out of fuel. Despite finishing so few races, none were down to driver error, though Caffi was unclassified in the Drivers' Championship.

1988

1988 saw Caffi switch to the new Scuderia Italia team. Early season form was thin. Their challenger for the season, the Dallara built and Ford-Cosworth powered F188 was not ready for the first race in Brazil, so to fulfil the championship's requirements of entering every race, a modified Formula 3000 car, the 3087, was used as a stop-gap. Not surprisingly, Caffi failed to pre-qualify.

The new car arrived in time for San Marino, but fortunes failed to improve as Caffi retired and an excellent 17th in qualifying at Monaco was ruined when he crashed all alone on the opening lap, the first blot on his career copybook. Caffi's third retirement in a row in Mexico and failure to qualify in Canada only added to the nightmare.

Mid-season though saw a turnaround in both Caffi's, and the team's season, with four finishes on the spin; eighth in the United States, 12th in France after qualifying 14th, 11th in Great Britain and 15th in Germany after qualifying 19th.

Form during the following five races was patchy. Three top-ten finishes; eighth in Belgium after qualifying 15th, seventh in Portugal (his best career finish at the time) after qualifying 17th and tenth in Spain after qualifying 18th, were scattered around a couple of retirements; in Hungary where he qualified in the top-ten for the first time in tenth, and Italy.

1988 concluded with a brace of retirements in Japan, where he spun off, and after qualifying 11th in Australia. For the second season in a row, Caffi was unclassified in the Drivers' Championship.

1989

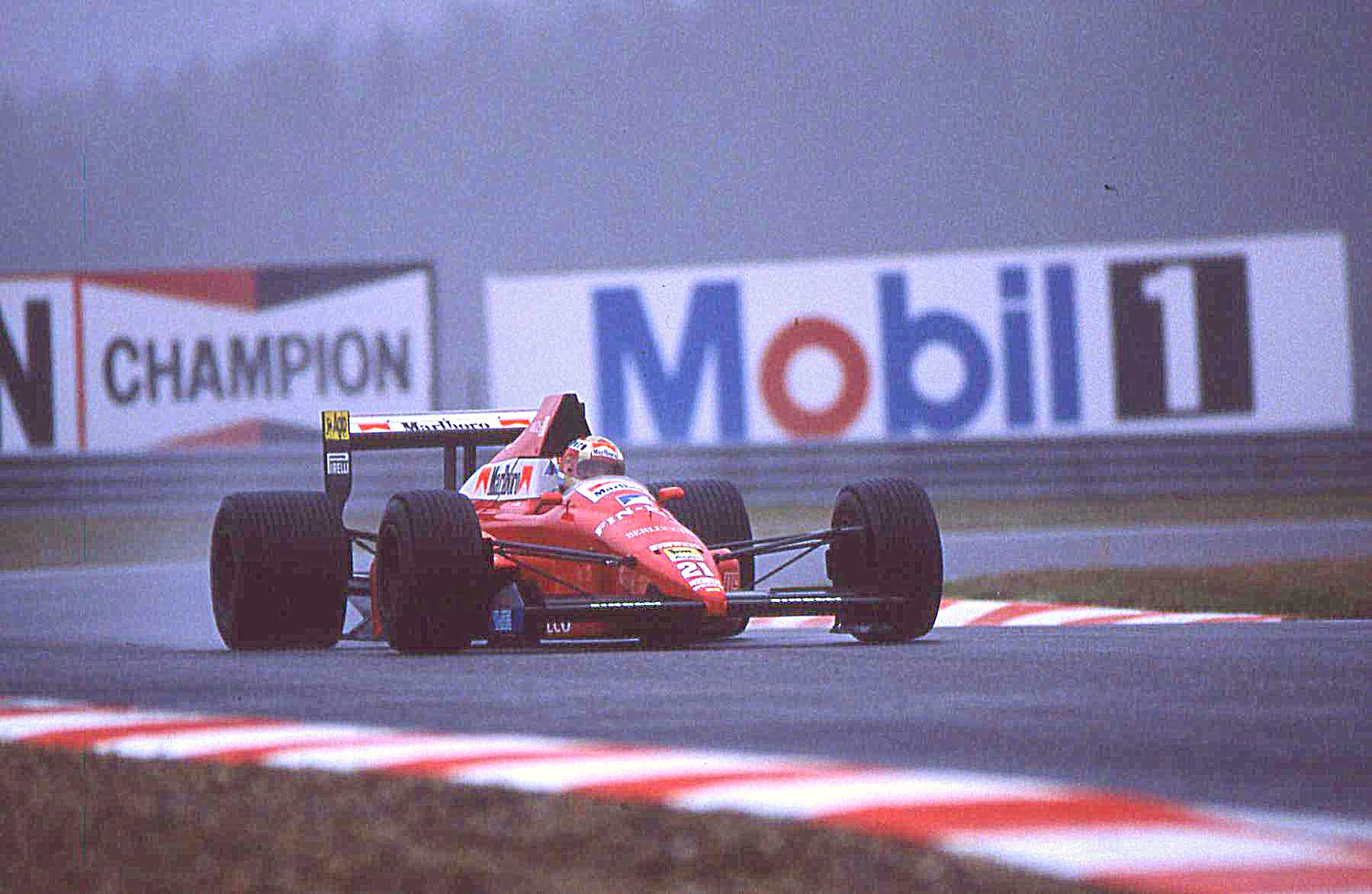
Caffi driving the Dallara 189 at the 1989 Belgian Grand Prix.

Scuderia Italia expanded to a two-car outfit for the 1989 season, with fellow Italian Andrea de Cesaris in the second Pirelli shod F189. As with the previous year, Caffi failed to pre-qualify for the opening round in Brazil, but San Marino, next on the calendar, saw Caffi qualify ninth and finish just outside the points in seventh.

Momentum continued onto Monaco with another top-ten in qualifying, ninth, followed by the first Formula One points for himself and the team with an excellent drive to 4th. 13th in Mexico was followed by retirement in the United States, when Caffi, who qualified sixth and at one stage was running second only to Alain Prost, was pushed into the wall rather comically whilst trying to lap teammate Andrea de Cesaris.

A second points finish of sixth in Canada was another highlight but Caffi's season rarely peaked after that with just two finishes in the final ten races; seventh in Hungary (after qualifying a stunning third) and ninth in Japan.

Failure to finish in France, Germany, Belgium, after spinning off, Italy, Portugal where he qualified seventh then collided with three-time World Drivers' Champion Nelson Piquet, Spain and Australia, where he qualified tenth before spinning off, along with a failure to pre-qualify in Great Britain rounded off an inconsistent year. Four points and 19th in the Drivers' Championship were Caffi's rewards.

=== 1990s ===
1990

Caffi, by now gaining a reputation as a promising talent, was tempted to Arrows for 1990 as Japan's Footwork Corporation were investing in the team throughout the year (to the extent that Arrows was renamed Footwork from 1991 to 1996) and Porsche had agreed to supply engines to the squad. Caffi was signed to drive the second A11 alongside another Italian, 1985 World Drivers' Championship runner-up Michele Alboreto.

Injury caused by a pre-season cycling accident forced Caffi to sit out the opening race in the United States, with German Bernd Schneider filling the gap. Retirement in Brazil and failure to qualify in San Marino only compounded Caffi's woes.

The following four races were patchy with a fifth, and two points, in Monaco followed by an eighth in Canada, failure to qualify in Mexico and retirement in France. Five consecutive top-ten finishes mid-season; in Great Britain, Germany, Hungary, Belgium and Italy brought about a consistency to Caffi's performance.

His, and everybody's, Portuguese Grand Prix was ended early when he crashed into the Lola of Aguri Suzuki and the resulting foot injuries ruled Caffi out of the next race, Spain, with Schneider once again deputising.

Another positive performance of ninth in Japan was cancelled out by failure to qualify for the final round in Australia. Over the course of the season Caffi scored all the team's points and outperformed the more experienced Alboreto to end 1990 with two points and 16th in the Drivers' Championship.

1991

As Caffi's career gradually rose in stock throughout the previous year, 1991 looked promising for the Italian. Unfortunately, the season turned out to be anything but. The Porsche 3512 V12 was cumbersome and underpowered, whilst both cars, the A11C and the FA12 were little better.

For the first time in his Formula One career, Caffi failed to qualify for any of the opening four races; in the United States, Brazil, San Marino, and Monaco.

The latter would be best remembered for a huge crash in practice, when Caffi slid off line and into the barriers at the Swimming Pool series of corners. The impact was so heavy, the car broke in three; the gearbox and rear wing broke free from the engine, which in turn came clear of the tub. Despite suffering no serious injuries as a result of the crash, Caffi was injured shortly after in a road accident.

As a result, Footwork drafted in Stefan Johansson for the races in Canada, Mexico, France and Great Britain and when Caffi returned to fitness, he discovered the team were trying to keep the Swede on. He managed to regain his seat via a legal injunction, but the struggles re-commenced with failure to qualify in Belgium compounded by pre-qualification failures in Germany, Hungary, Italy, Portugal and Spain.

The season ended on a slightly higher note, as Caffi finished tenth in Japan and kept his head above water to finish 15th in the deluge in Australia. A season of catastrophe yielded no points and no classification in the Drivers' Championship.

1992

Footwork signed Aguri Suzuki to partner Michele Alboreto ahead of the 1992 season and Caffi was, rather abruptly, shown the door. With little time to find a drive, and most seats taken, he had no option but to sign for the new Andrea Moda team, alongside Italian Enrico Bertaggia. The team, owned by shoe-magnate and playboy Andrea Sassetti, had bought out the Coloni squad in 1991 and planned to use their C4 chassis with Judd V10 power for the new season.

However, registration problems with the FIA (involving Sassetti's refusal to pay the $100,000 entrance fee for new teams) meant that Caffi managed no more than a few exploratory laps at the South African Grand Prix, the opening round of 1992. Before the next round in Mexico, the team's new car, the Nick Wirth-designed S921, was built and prepared but freight delays forced Sassetti to withdraw both Caffi and Bertaggia from the Mexican event.

After two races Caffi had had enough, voiced his displeasure of the situation and was fired by Sassetti, with Brazilian super-sub Roberto Moreno taking his seat. No points from both races meant no classification in the Drivers' Championship, but more significantly, it signalled the end of the Italian's Formula One career at the age of 28.

== Later life ==
After F1, Caffi raced on and off in sports and touring cars, mainly in the United States, where in 1998 he had an IRL test at Pikes Peak Raceway. After a brief career in Spanish and Italian Touring Cars, Caffi found his niche in sportscars, racing in GTs, FIA Sportscar, and ALMS. He returned to International motorsport in the IRC Rally Monte-Carlo 2011, driving a Skoda Fabia S2000. 25 years after his Formula 1 career, Caffi won on the streets of the Principality during the Monaco Grand Prix Historique 2016. Caffi was one of the high-profile winners during the 10th running of the GP Historique when he guided the Kessel Racing Ensign N176 to victory in the Pre 1977 3-litre F1 race.

In 2016, Caffi formed his own racing team Alex Caffi Motorsport. Alex Caffi Motorsport entered the NASCAR Whelen Euro Series on the same year as its formation, competing on a part-time basis for its debut season before stepping up to full-time competition in 2017. The team took part in the NASCAR Whelen Euro Series under the Alex Caffi Motorsport guise for five seasons before it was rebranded to Academy Motorsport in 2021 after entrepreneur Federico Monti became the co-owner of the team. Academy continues to compete in the NASCAR Whelen Euro Series to this day, currently fielding the No. 1 Ford Mustang and No. 5 EuroNASCAR FJ 2020 in both EuroNASCAR PRO and EuroNASCAR 2.

When Caffi is not racing, he is an instructor at the official Subaru Italia safety driving and racing school.

== Racing record ==
=== Career summary ===
Season	Series	Team	Races	Wins	Poles	F/Laps	Podiums	Points	Position
1984	Italian Formula Three Championship	Euroteam	12	2	3	4	7	46	**2nd**
1985	FIA European Formula 3 Cup	Team Gulf Coloni	1	1	1	1	1	N/A	**1st**
1985	Italian Formula Three Championship	Team Gulf Coloni	13	2	4	3	8	53	**2nd**
1986	FIA European Formula 3 Cup	Venturini Racing	1	0	0	0	1	N/A	**2nd**
1986	Italian Formula Three Championship	Venturini Racing	13	2	4	3	8	53	**3rd**
1986	Formula One	Osella Squadra Corse	1	0	0	0	0	0	NC
1987	Formula One	Osella Squadra Corse	14	0	0	0	0	0	NC
1988	Formula One Indoor Trophy	Scuderia Italia	4	3	3	3	4	N/A	**2nd**
1988	Formula One	Scuderia Italia	14	0	0	0	0	0	NC
1989	Formula One	Scuderia Italia	14	0	0	0	0	4	19th
1990	Formula One	Footwork Arrows	11	0	0	0	0	2	16th
1991	Formula One	Footwork Grand Prix International	2	0	0	0	0	0	NC
1992	Formula One	Andrea Moda Formula	1	0	0	0	0	0	NC
1995	Campeonato de España de Turismos	Opel Team España	20	1	0	0	4	123	8th
1999	24 Hours of Le Mans	Courage Compétition	1	0	0	0	0	N/A	6th
2000	Spa 24 Hours	Taverna Racing & Classic	1	0	0	0	0	N/A	DNF
2004	24 Hours of Le Mans	Seikel Motorsport	1	0	0	0	0	N/A	DNF
2006	Grand Prix Masters	Team Altech	1	0	0	0	0	2	7th
2006	Italian GT Championship - GT2	Villorba Corse	14	1	0	1	7	128	**1st**
2007	24 Hours of Le Mans	Spyker Squadron	1	0	0	0	0	N/A	DNF
2016	Historic Grand Prix of Monaco	Kessel Racing	1	1	1	1	1	N/A	**1st**
2016	Nascar Whelen Euro Series	Alex Caffi Motorsport	4	0	0	0	0	284	19th
2018	Nascar Whelen Euro Series	Alex Caffi Motorsport	2	0	0	0	0	41	42nd
2018	Historic Grand Prix of Monaco	Ensign Racing	1	0	0	1	0	N/A	14th
2019	Nascar Whelen Euro Series	Alex Caffi Motorsport	2	0	0	0	0	28	42nd
2021	Historic Grand Prix of Monaco	Scuderia Ferrari	1	0	0	0	0	N/A	DNS
2026	Nascar Euro Series	Academy Motorsport	2	0	0	0	0	45	27th

* Season still in progress.

=== Complete Formula One results ===
(key)

Year	Entrant	Chassis	Engine	1	2	3	4	5	6	7	8	9	10	11	12	13	14	15	16	WDC	Points
1986	Osella Squadra Corse	Osella FA1G	Alfa Romeo V8	BRA	ESP	SMR	MON	BEL	CAN	DET	FRA	GBR	GER	HUN	AUT	ITA; NC	POR	MEX	AUS	NC	0
1987	Osella Squadra Corse	Osella FA1I	Alfa Romeo V8	BRA; Ret	SMR; 12	BEL; Ret	MON; Ret	DET; Ret		GBR; Ret	GER; Ret	HUN; Ret	AUT; Ret	ITA; Ret	POR; Ret	ESP; DNQ	MEX; Ret	JPN; Ret	AUS; DNQ	NC	0
1987	Osella Squadra Corse	Osella FA1G	Alfa Romeo V8						FRA; Ret											NC	0
1988	Scuderia Italia	Dallara 3087	Cosworth V8	BRA; DNPQ																NC	0
1988	Scuderia Italia	Dallara 188	Cosworth V8		SMR; Ret	MON; Ret	MEX; Ret	CAN; DNPQ	DET; 8	FRA; 12	GBR; 11	GER; 15	HUN; Ret	BEL; 8	ITA; Ret	POR; 7	ESP; 10	JPN; Ret	AUS; Ret	NC	0
1989	Scuderia Italia	Dallara 189	Cosworth V8	BRA; DNPQ	SMR; 7	MON; 4	MEX; 13	USA; Ret	CAN; 6	FRA; Ret	GBR; DNPQ	GER; Ret	HUN; 7	BEL; Ret	ITA; 11	POR; Ret	ESP; Ret	JPN; 9	AUS; Ret	19th	4
1990	Footwork Arrows Racing	Arrows A11B	Cosworth V8	USA	BRA; Ret	SMR; DNQ	MON; 5	CAN; 8	MEX; DNQ	FRA; Ret	GBR; 7	GER; 9	HUN; 9	BEL; 10	ITA; 9	POR; 13	ESP	JPN; 9	AUS; DNQ	16th	2
1991	Footwork Grand Prix International	Footwork A11C	Porsche V12	USA; DNQ	BRA; DNQ															NC	0
1991	Footwork Grand Prix International	Footwork FA12	Porsche V12			SMR; DNQ	MON; DNQ	CAN	MEX											NC	0
1991	Footwork Grand Prix International	Footwork FA12C	Cosworth V8							FRA	GBR	GER; DNPQ	HUN; DNPQ	BEL; DNQ	ITA; DNPQ	POR; DNPQ	ESP; DNPQ	JPN; 10	AUS; 15	NC	0
1992	Andrea Moda Formula	Coloni C4B	Judd V10	RSA; EX																NC	0
1992	Andrea Moda Formula	Andrea Moda S921	Judd V10		MEX; DNP	BRA	ESP	SMR	MON	CAN	FRA	GBR	GER	HUN	BEL	ITA	POR	JPN	AUS	NC	0

=== Complete Campeonato de España de Turismos ===
(key) (Races in bold indicate pole position) (Races in italics indicate fastest lap)

Year	Team	Car	1	2	3	4	5	6	7	8	9	10	11	12	13	14	15	16	17	18	19	20	Pos.	Pts
1995	Opel Team Espaňa	Opel Vectra GT	JER; 1; 5	JER; 2 Ret	JAR; 1; 7	JAR; 2; 5	BAR; 1; 1	BAR; 2; 3	EST; 1; 10	EST; 2 Ret	ALB; 1; 3	ALB; 2 Ret	CAL; 1 Ret	CAL; 2; 10	ALB; 1; 4	ALB; 2; 4	JER; 1; 2	JER; 2 Ret	BAR; 1; 3	BAR; 2; 4	JAR; 1 Ret	JAR; 2 Ret	8th	123

=== Complete 24 Hours of Le Mans results ===
Year	Team	Co-Drivers	Car	Class	Laps	Pos.	Class Pos.
1999	(France) Courage Compétition	(Italy) Andrea Montermini (Italy) Domenico Schiattarella	Courage C52-Nissan	LMP	342	6th	5th
2004	(Germany) Seikel Motorsport	(Italy) Gabrio Rosa (Netherlands) Peter van Merksteijn Sr.	Porsche 911 GT3-RS	GT	148	DNF	DNF
2007	(Netherlands) Spyker Squadron	(Italy) Andrea Belicchi (Switzerland) Andrea Chiesa	Spyker C8 Spyder GT2-R	GT2	145	DNF	DNF

=== Complete Grand Prix Masters results ===
(key) Races in bold indicate pole position, races in italics indicate fastest lap.

Year	Team	Chassis	Engine	1	2	3	4	5
2006	Team Altech	Delta Motorsport GPM	Nicholson McLaren 3.5 V8	QAT	ITA; C	GBR; 5	MAL; C	RSA; C

=== Complete NASCAR results ===
(key) (Bold – Pole position awarded by qualifying time. Italics – Pole position earned by points standings or practice time. * – Most laps led.)

==== Whelen Euro Series – Elite 1 ====
NASCAR Whelen Euro Series – Elite 1 results
Year	Team	No.	Make	1	2	3	4	5	6	7	8	9	10	11	12	13	NWES	Pts	Ref
2016	Alex Caffi Motorsport	23	Ford	VAL	VAL	VEN	VEN	BRH	BRH	TOU	TOU	ADR; 7	ADR; 5	ZOL; 20	ZOL; 6		19th	284	
2018	Alex Caffi Motorsport	1	Ford	VAL	VAL	FRA; 22	FRA; 11	BRH	BRH	TOU	TOU	HOC	HOC	ZOL	ZOL		42nd	41	
2019	Alex Caffi Motorsport	1	Ford	VAL	VAL	FRA; 28	FRA; 18	BRH	BRH	MOS	MOS	VEN	HOC	HOC	ZOL	ZOL	42nd	28	

Sporting positions
Preceded by Inaugural	FIA European Formula Three Cup; Winner; 1985	Succeeded by Stefano Modena
