= Maria Grazia Davino =

Italian automotive executive

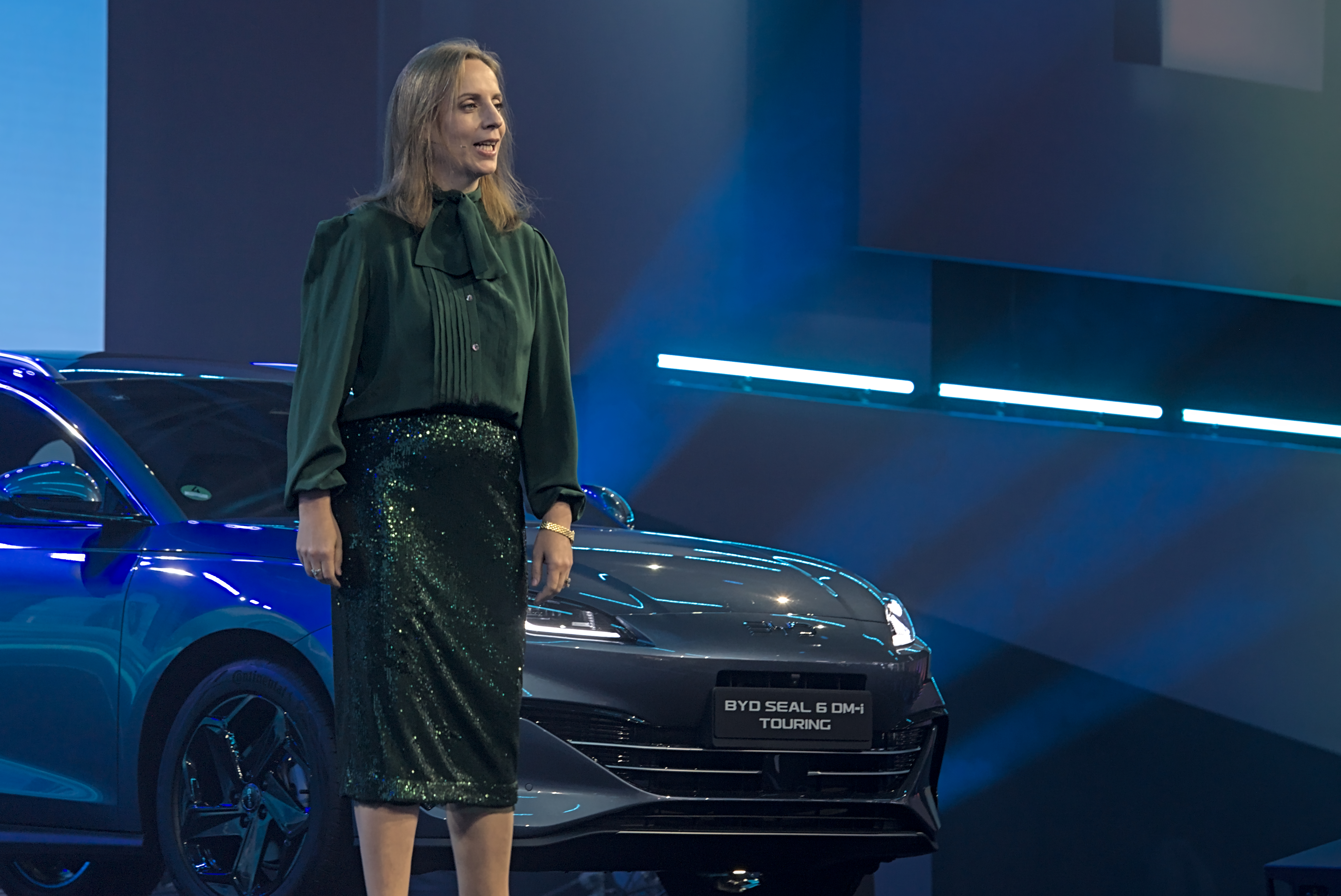
- Born: Naples, Italy
- Education: University of Salerno and Profingest Business School
- Occupation: Automotive Executive
- Employer: Ford of Europe (2026-) BYD (2024-26) Stellantis (2011-24)
- Awards: Automotive News Rising Stars

Maria Grazia Davino is an Italian automotive executive and will be vice president of sales for Ford of Europe from 1 October 2026. Davino was managing director of Stellantis UK until October 2024. From December 2024 to 2026 she became regional managing director for Germany, Switzerland, Poland, Austria and Czech Republic for the Chinese car manufacturer BYD.

== Career ==
Davino started her automotive career at Lamborghini in 2003 as a product manager while studying for a PhD in semiotics at the Bauhaus University, Germany which she didn't finish. She then became PA to the CEO Stephan Winkelmann.

Davino joined the Fiat Chrysler Automobiles (then Fiat Group) in 2011 and has held the CEO positions in Austria, Switzerland and Germany. In 2021, she was appointed head of Sales and Marketing for Europe in the newly created Stellantis Group. In 2017 she was one of the Automotive News Rising Stars.

Davino was promoted to managing director of Stellantis UK from September 2023 and left in October 2024. In the summer of 2024 she warned in an industry speech that "Stellantis production in the UK could stop", referring to the Vauxhall Ellesmere Port and Vauxhall Luton plants.

== Education ==
Davino gained a bachelor's degree in philosophy and enterprise communications from University of Salerno, Italy and a master's degree in finance control from Profingest Business School, Bologna, Italy.
