= Lamborghini Estoque =

Car model

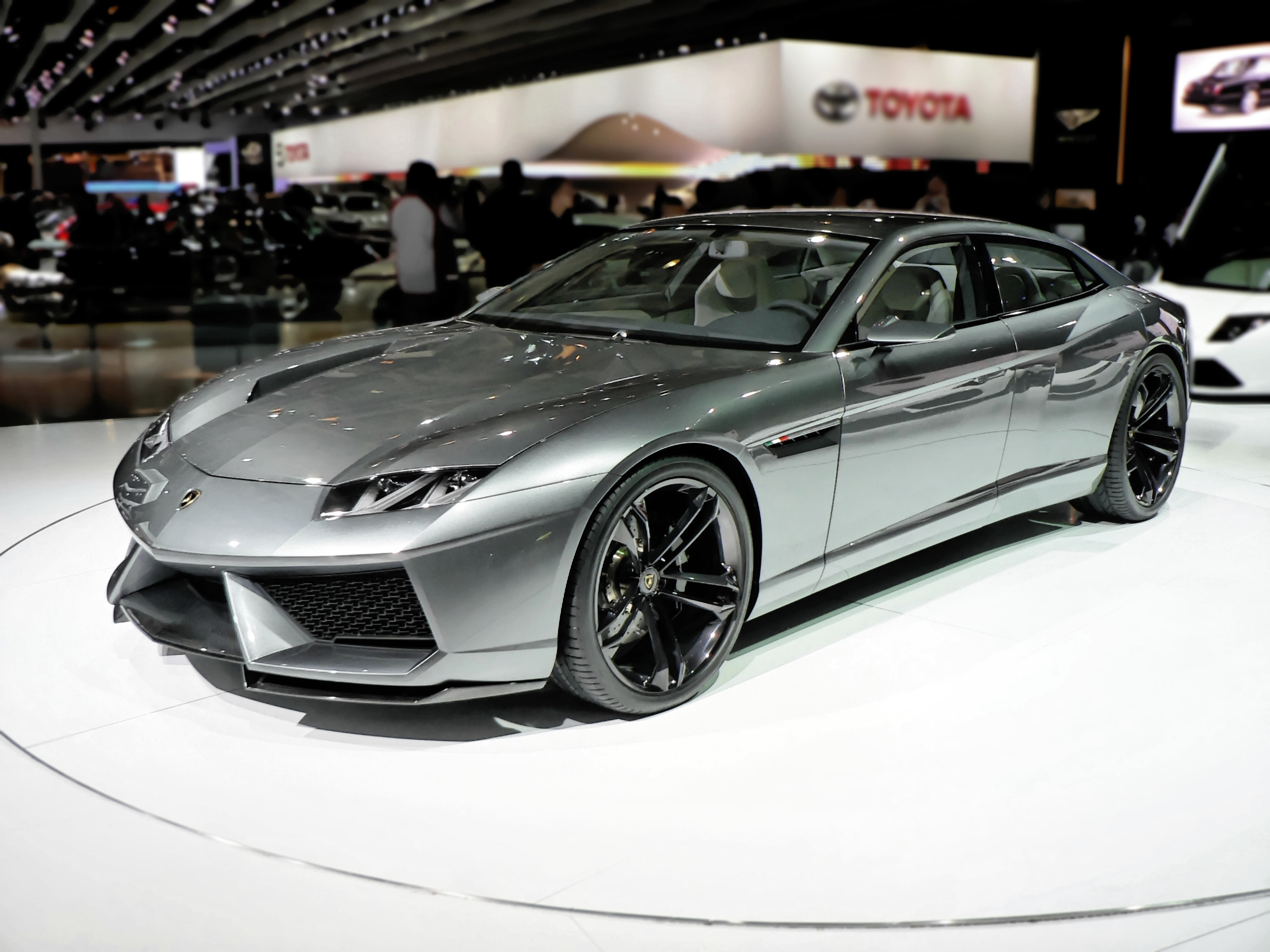

Overview
- Manufacturer: Automobili Lamborghini S.p.A.
- Production: 2008
- Designer: Filippo Perini

Body and chassis
- Class: Concept car
- Body style: 4-door saloon
- Layout: Front-engine, all wheel drive

Powertrain
- Engine: 5.2 L FSI V10
- Transmission: 7-Speed Dual-clutch transmission

Dimensions
- Wheelbase: 3,010 mm (118.5 in)
- Length: 5,150 mm (202.8 in)
- Width: 1,990 mm (78.3 in)
- Height: 1,350 mm (53.1 in)
- Curb weight: 1,665 kg (3,670.7 lb)

The Lamborghini Estoque (Spanish pronunciation: [esˈtoke]) is a one-off concept car built by Italian automobile manufacturer Lamborghini. Unlike Lamborghini models as of 2008, which were mid-engine, two-seater sports cars, the Estoque is a four-door sedan.

== Introduction ==
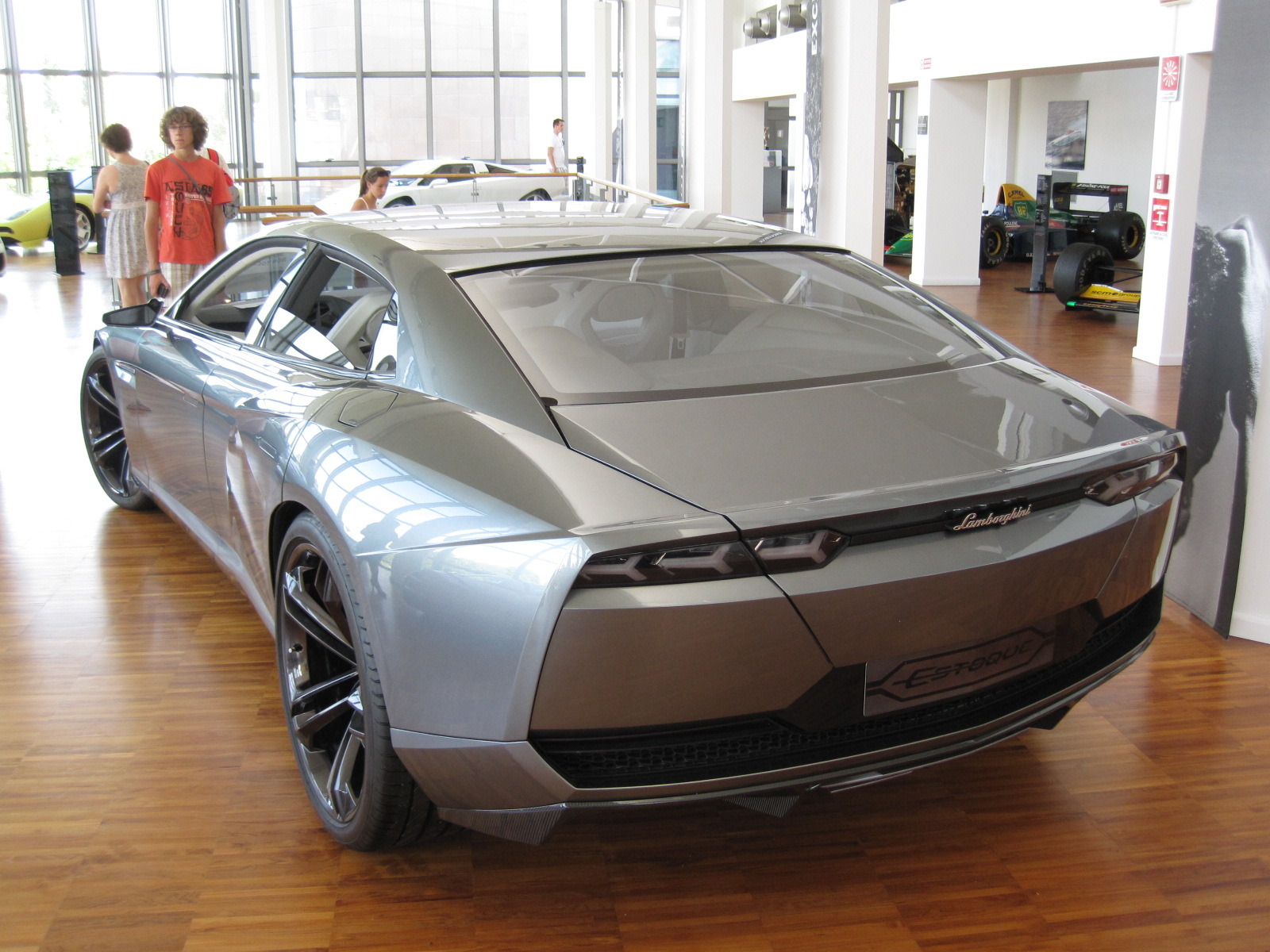
Rear view

The Estoque was introduced at the 2008 Paris Motor Show. The Estoque is the first front-engine vehicle to be introduced by Lamborghini since the LM002 utility vehicle. It was described as a "concept for a $230,000 four-door sedan". It had a 5.2 litre V10 engine shared with the Gallardo, although there had been speculation that this would be replaced by a V12, V8, or possibly even a hybrid or a turbo-diesel engine, as suggested by the then Lamborghini Brand Director, Manfred Fitzgerald.

== Nomenclature ==
As with majority of the Lamborghini models, the Estoque derives its name from the sport and tradition of bullfighting: An estoque is a type of sword traditionally used by matadors.

== Speculation regarding production ==
It was reported on 22 March 2009 that production plans for the Lamborghini Estoque were cancelled. Lamborghini executives responded to this by stating that the Estoque had not reached the production planning stage and that the decision whether to produce the Estoque or not has been delayed due to sales and marketing considerations. Stephan Winkelmann, the Lamborghini chairman, has since indicated that a four-door Lamborghini is likely, stating that response to the Estoque showed opportunities for Lamborghini outside the sports car market. The release of the Lamborghini Urus in 2018 indicates that the 4-door market is one in which Lamborghini is interested in competing. However, Winkelmann also stated that Lamborghini does not have any plans to manufacture the Estoque and that it was only a concept vehicle.
