= Lamborghini Countach QVX =

Racing car

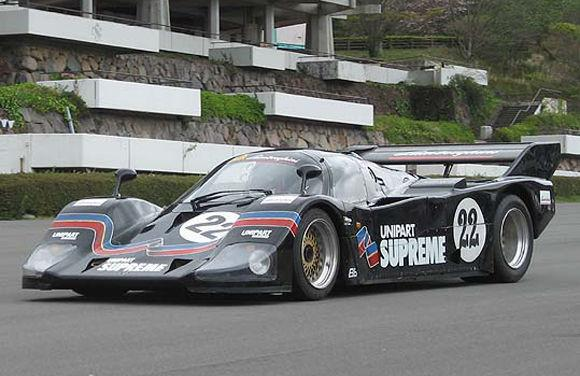
- Category: Group C1
- Constructor: Lamborghini (Spice)
- Designer(s): Graham Humphrys
- Successor: Lamborghini SC63

Technical specifications
- Engine: Lamborghini 5,700 cc (347.8 cu in) 24-valve DOHC 60° V12 engine, naturally aspirated, mid-engined, longitudinally mounted
- Transmission: Hewland VG-C 5-speed manual
- Tyres: Goodyear

Competition history
- Notable entrants: (United Kingdom) Portman Lamborghini (United Kingdom) Spice Engineering
- Notable drivers: (United Kingdom) Tiff Needell (Italy) Mauro Baldi
- Debut: 1986 500 km Kyalami
Races	Wins	Poles	F/Laps
1 (7 entries)	0	0	0
- Teams' Championships: 0
- Constructors' Championships: 0
- Drivers' Championships: 0

The Lamborghini Countach QVX, occasionally referred to as the Lamborghini QVX, was a short-lived Group C sports racing car built in 1985. It was not built or designed by the Lamborghini factory, but instead used a Spice Engineering-built chassis and an engine derived from the Lamborghini Countach's V12. Lamborghini's British importer commissioned the car. Financial issues restricted it to one race, despite numerous entries in 1986 and a handful in 1987, but its one race showed the car had potential.

== Development ==
In 1985, David Jolliffe, Lamborghini's official British importer, attempted to run the Lamborghini Countach LP5000S in Group B sports car racing, but was prohibited as the car's production run was insufficient to homologate the car. After the failure of this effort, he instead acquired a 5.7-litre V12 engine based on that used in the Countach QV and commissioned Luigi Marmiroli to develop the engine for Group C racing. Using lessons learned from Lamborghini's successful marine engines, the Lamborghini factory were able to extract between 650 and 700 horsepower from the engine, which was then coupled to a Hewland VG-C transmission. Jolliffe commissioned Spice Engineering to build and design the chassis, which then had the modified Countach engine fitted.

== Racing history ==
CC Motorsports were selected to run the car for the 1986 World Sportscar Championship season, with Tiff Needell and Mauro Baldi as the car's drivers. However, the team struggled to find sponsorship, and Unipart were the only firm to fund the project. A few minor races followed in 1985 but, despite some successful performances, the financial issues were apparent. The team, now known as Portman Lamborghini (after the name of the British importer) attempted to run the Countach QVX in its first international race at the 360 km of Monza in April 1986; however, the team did not attend the race. Three more no-shows followed, most notably including the 1986 24 Hours of Le Mans, before the car finally was run by Spice Engineering at the 500 km Kyalami in November 1986.

As this was a non-championship race, the works teams of Jaguar, Sauber and Lancia were not present; however, the semi-works Porsche and Rondeau teams were, as was the works Tiga team. Tiff Needell drove the car and qualified seventh, behind all of the Porsche 956 and Porsche 962 entries, but ahead of the Zakspeed, the Tiga and the former-Joest Schuster Porsche 936C. The first race saw Needell sitting in seventh, in a similar situation to qualifying; however, due to attrition, he moved up to fifth in the second race. As a result, Needell was classified fifth overall, ahead of three other Group C1 cars (Ernst Schuster's privately entered Porsche 936C, the works-run Tiga GC86 and Patrick Oudet's privately entered Rondeau M382). This would be the only time the Countach QVX would compete in an international event; despite Portman Lamborghini making two further entries in 1987, at the 1000 km of Silverstone and the 24 Hours of Le Mans, they did not attend either race and the Countach QVX was retired. The financial issues that the team had suffered from simply proved insurmountable and it would be another few years before another Lamborghini-engined car, the Konrad KM-011, entered a major sportscar race, in 1991. Spice Engineering also attempted to enter a Lamborghini-engined Spice SE90C in the 1990 World Sportscar Championship but were ultimately unsuccessful. It would be ten years before a Lamborghini (the Diablo) appeared in top-class sports car racing again.
