= Konrad KM-011 =

Sports prototype

- Category: Sports car racing
- Constructor: (Austria) Konrad Motorsport
- Designer: (United Kingdom) Geoff Kingston

Technical specifications
- Chassis: Carbon monocoque
- Suspension (front): Inboard Dampers actuated by pushrods and rockers
- Suspension (rear): Inboard Dampers actuated by pushrods and rockers
- Engine: Lamborghini LE3512 3493cc V12 Naturally aspirated mid-mounted
- Transmission: 6-speed manual transmission
- Fuel: Elf
- Tyres: Yokohama

Competition history
- Notable entrants: (Austria) Konrad Motorsport
- Notable drivers: (Austria) Franz Konrad (Sweden) Stefan Johansson
- Debut: 1991 430km of Nürburgring
- Last season: 1992
Races	Wins	Poles	F/Laps
5	0	0	0
- Constructors' Championships: 0
- Drivers' Championships: 0

The Konrad KM-011 was a sports prototype built for Group C racing in the 1991 World Sportscar Championship season. The car was part of a brief partnership between Konrad Motorsport and Lamborghini.

== Development ==
At the time of the development of the KM-011, Konrad Motorsport was competing with Porsche 962s in the World Sportscar Championship. Konrad was a long time Porsche campaigner, but knew that for 1992 his 962 would no longer be legal to run in the series, and Porsche had no planned replacement. Thus Konrad would need to either buy a customer chassis or build his own car, as well as find a new engine supplier to meet the new 3.5 Liter formula. To meet the engine requirement, Konrad turned to Lamborghini and their owner at the time, Chrysler, planning to use the Formula One engine that the company currently supplied to Ligier and Modena. At the time, both Formula One and World Sportscar Championship engine requirements were the same, allowing for teams to build engines for both series. Thus in order to allow Lamborghini to expand into sportscars involvement following the failure of the Countach QVX, they agreed to supply their 640 bhp (477 kW; 649 PS), Lamborghini LE3512 V12 designed by longtime Ferrari designer Mauro Forghieri. The engine had made its Formula One debut at the 1989 Brazilian Grand Prix.

For the chassis, team founder Franz Konrad hired Geoff Kingston, who would set about designing the car that would become known as the KM-011. The design of the car was rather simple, borrowing established design features from such cars as Konrad's own 962. Among the main attributes was a larger, more squared off front end and a large roof-mounted hood scoop to better feed the engine, similar in style to other newer 3.5 liter Group C cars.

The car would run on Yokohama tires and be primarily sponsored by Wärtsilä Diesel Group, as well as carrying some sponsorship for Chrysler and French fuel company Elf in some rounds.

== Racing history ==
For the 1991 season, Konrad initially ran their 962, scoring a handful of points in the first four races of the season. At round five, at the team's home event of the Nürburgring, Konrad debuted the KM-011 in the hands of drivers Franz Konrad and Stefan Johansson. The car failed to qualify for the event and Konrad instead turned to his older 962, taking a points-scoring finish. At the next round at Magny-Cours, the car was successful in qualifying, allowing Konrad to abandon their 962, but the KM-011 failed to finish after 18 laps due to a failed starter motor.

Wishing to finish the season, Franz Konrad gathered the budget to fly the KM-011 and Konrad Motorsport team to the final two rounds of the season in Mexico City and Autopolis, Japan. In Mexico the KM-011 lasted 36 laps before its gearbox gave out. This was followed by suspension failure at Autopolis after a mere 24 laps. With this, the KM-011 failed to score any points in the World Sportscar Championship season, the 962 being the only car to score.

However, during the break from Mexico City to Autopolis, Konrad had the KM-011 flown back to Europe to participate in the final Interserie round at Zeltweg. In the first heat, Franz Konrad drove the KM-011 on his own to a 7th-place finish. The second heat saw the KM-011 suffer problems and fail to finish three laps from the finish. The combined results therefore gave the KM-011 a 16th-place finish, classified as a finisher.

The KM-011 would make one final appearance at the first Interserie round at the Nürburgring in 1992 still driven by Franz Konrad. The car would take 3rd place in the first heat, followed by a 4th place in the second. This combined result earned Konrad an overall 4th-place finish in the race. Funding for the project would soon end. Although Konrad promised to be on the grid for the 1992 World Sportscar Championship season, the car never showed.

This would be the only car that Konrad would build themselves. They would return to running customer cars, mostly Porsches, following the retirement of the KM-011.
