= Lamborghini =

Italian automobile manufacturer

Automobili Lamborghini S.p.A.

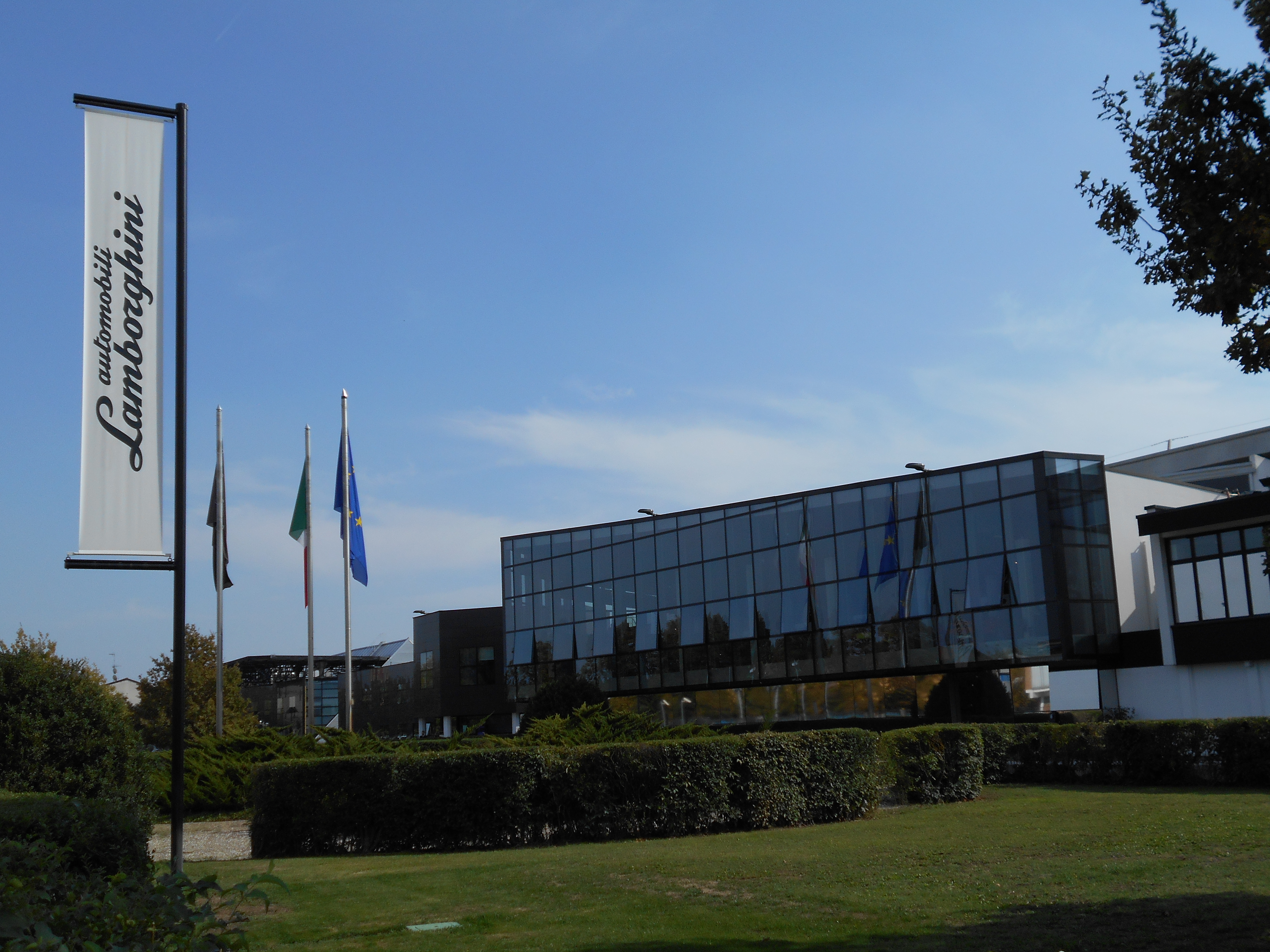
- Headquarters in Sant'Agata Bolognese, Italy
- Type: Subsidiary
- Industry: Automotive
- Founded: 1963; 63 years ago
- Founder: Ferruccio Lamborghini
- Headquarters: Sant'Agata Bolognese, Emilia-Romagna, Italy
- Number of locations: 135 dealerships
- Area served: Worldwide
- Key people: Stephan Winkelmann (CEO)
- Production output: ▲10,687 vehicles (2024)
- Revenue: ▲€3.10 billion (2024)
- Operating income: ▲€835 million (2024)
- Net income: ▲€10.1 million (2014)
- Total equity: ▲€1.832 billion (2014)
- Number of employees: 1,779 (December 2020)
- Parent: Audi AG
- Subsidiaries: Ducati Motor Holding
- Website: lamborghini.com

Automobili Lamborghini S.p.A. (Note: English: /ˌlæmbərˈɡiːni/ LAM-bər-GHEE-nee; Italian: [ˌautoˈmɔːbili lamborˈɡiːni].) (colloquially Lambo) is an Italian manufacturer of luxury sports cars and SUVs based in Sant'Agata Bolognese. The company is owned by the Volkswagen Group through its subsidiary Audi.

Ferruccio Lamborghini (1916–1993), an Italian manufacturing magnate, founded Automobili Ferruccio Lamborghini S.p.A. in 1963 to compete with Ferrari. The company was noted for using a rear mid-engine, rear-wheel drive layout. Lamborghini grew rapidly during its first decade, but sales plunged in the wake of the 1973 worldwide financial downturn and the oil crisis. The firm's ownership changed three times after 1973, including a bankruptcy in 1978. American Chrysler Corporation took control of Lamborghini in 1987 and sold it to Malaysian investment group Mycom Setdco and Indonesian group V'Power Corporation in 1994. In 1998, Mycom Setdco and V'Power sold Lamborghini to the Volkswagen Group where it was placed under the control of the group's Audi division.

New products and model lines were introduced to the brand's portfolio and brought to the market and saw an increased productivity for the brand. In the late 2000s, during the Great Recession, Lamborghini's sales dropped nearly 50%.

Lamborghini currently produces the twin-turbo V8 plug-in Hybrid Temerario, the Urus SUV powered by a twin-turbo V8 engine, and the Revuelto, a V12/electric hybrid, as of 2025. In addition, the company produces V12 engines for offshore powerboat racing.

Lamborghini Trattori, founded in 1948 by Ferruccio Lamborghini, is headquartered in Pieve di Cento, Italy, and continues to produce tractors. Since 1973, Lamborghini Trattori has been a separate entity from the Lamborghini's automobile division.

== History ==
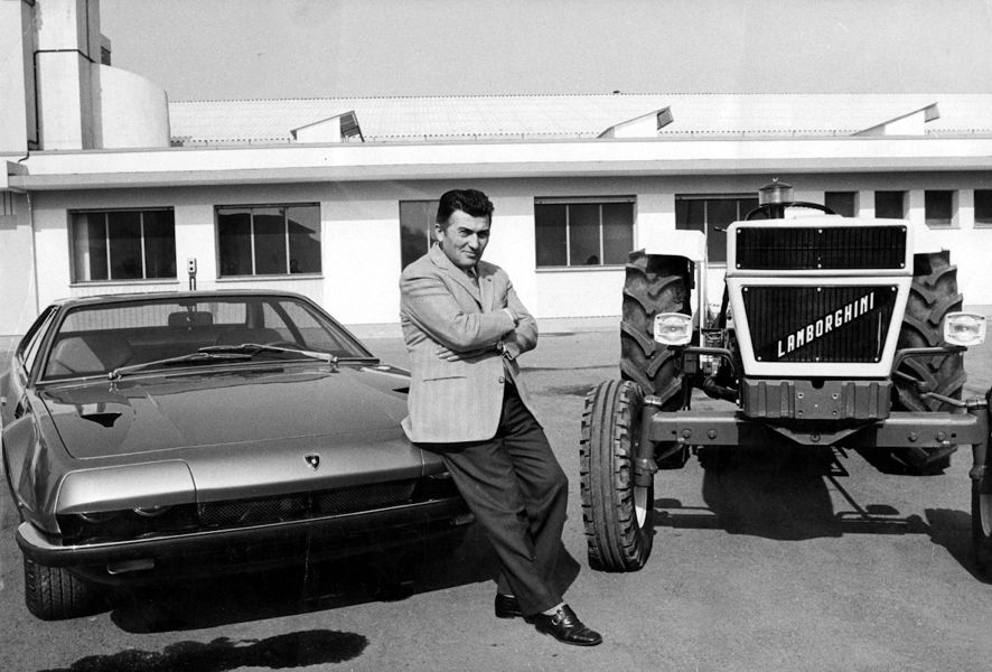
Ferruccio Lamborghini with a Jarama and a tractor of his brand

Manufacturing magnate Italian Ferruccio Lamborghini founded the company in 1963 with the objective of producing a refined grand touring car to compete with offerings from established marques such as Ferrari. The company's first models, such as the 350 GT, were released in the mid-1960s. Lamborghini was noted for the 1966 Miura sports coupé, which used a rear mid-engine, rear-wheel drive layout.

Ferruccio Lamborghini, already an established industrialist who manufactured tractors, boilers, and air conditioners, founded Lamborghini Automobili on 7 May 1963.

The company was headquartered in a purpose-built facility in Sant'Agata Bolognese. He surrounded himself with highly capable engineers and technicians: Giotto Bizzarrini designed the engine, Gian Paolo Dallara and Paolo Stanzani developed the chassis, and Franco Scaglione designed the bodywork. The first model, the 350 GTV, was not a success due to its futuristic style and remained a one-off prototype. The project was then handed over to the Milanese coachbuilder Touring, which created a more classic and sober design. The new car, named the 350 GT, was a fast and elegant two-seater grand tourer (according to Ferruccio's standards) and was the first series-produced car by Lamborghini. It achieved moderate sales success and was followed by the 400 GT (which benefited from an increased engine capacity) and the 400 GT 2+2, both presented in 1966.

Lamborghini grew rapidly during its first ten years, but sales fell in the wake of the 1973 worldwide financial downturn and the oil crisis. Ferruccio Lamborghini sold a majority stake in the company to Georges-Henri Rossetti in 1972 and sold his remaining interest to René Leimer, fully retiring from the business in 1974. The company went bankrupt in 1978, and was placed in the receivership of brothers Jean-Claude and Patrick Mimran in 1980. The Mimrans purchased the company out of receivership by 1984 and invested heavily in its expansion. Under the Mimrans' management, Lamborghini's model line was expanded from the Countach to include the Jalpa sports car and the LM002 high-performance off-road vehicle.

The Mimrans sold Lamborghini to the Chrysler Corporation in 1987. After replacing the Countach with the Diablo and discontinuing the Jalpa and the LM002, Chrysler sold Lamborghini to MegaTech Ltd in 1994; the following year, Malaysian investment group Mycom Setdco and Indonesian group V'Power Corporation acquired the company. In 1998, Mycom Setdco and V'Power sold Lamborghini to the Volkswagen Group where it was placed under the control of the group's Audi division. New products and model lines were introduced to the brand's portfolio and brought to the market and saw an increased productivity for the brand Lamborghini. In the late 2000s, during the Great Recession, Lamborghini's sales dropped nearly 50%.

In 2021, the CEO of Lamborghini said that by 2024 all its models will be hybrid.

Lamborghini ownership
Years	Owner
1963–1972	Ferruccio Lamborghini
1972–1977	Georges-Henri Rossetti and René Leimer
1977–1984	Receivership
1984–1987	Patrick Mimran
1987–1994	Chrysler Corporation
1994–1995	MegaTech
1995–1998	V'Power and Mycom Sedtco
1998–present	Audi AG

== Products ==
=== Automobiles ===
As of 2026, Lamborghini's automobile product range consists of three model lines: Revuelto, Temerario, and Urus.

==== Models in production ====
- Revuelto

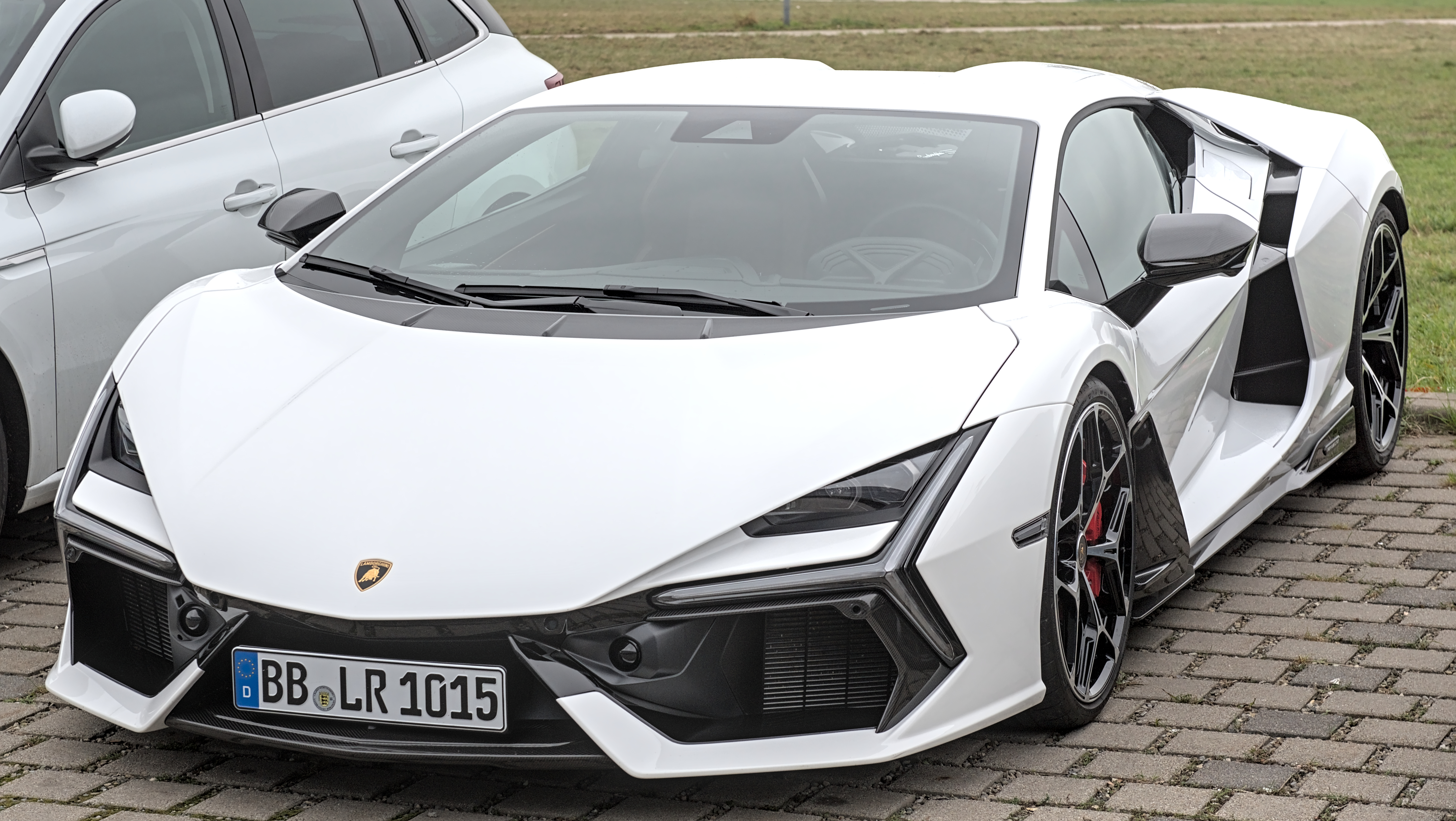
Lamborghini Revuelto coupe

Production of the new Revuelto began in mid-2023 and was delivered in late 2023 as a 2024 model. A 6.5L naturally aspirated V12 engine and three magnetic motors power the car for a combined output of 1,001 hp (1,015 PS). The Revuelto is the successor to the Aventador.

- Temerario

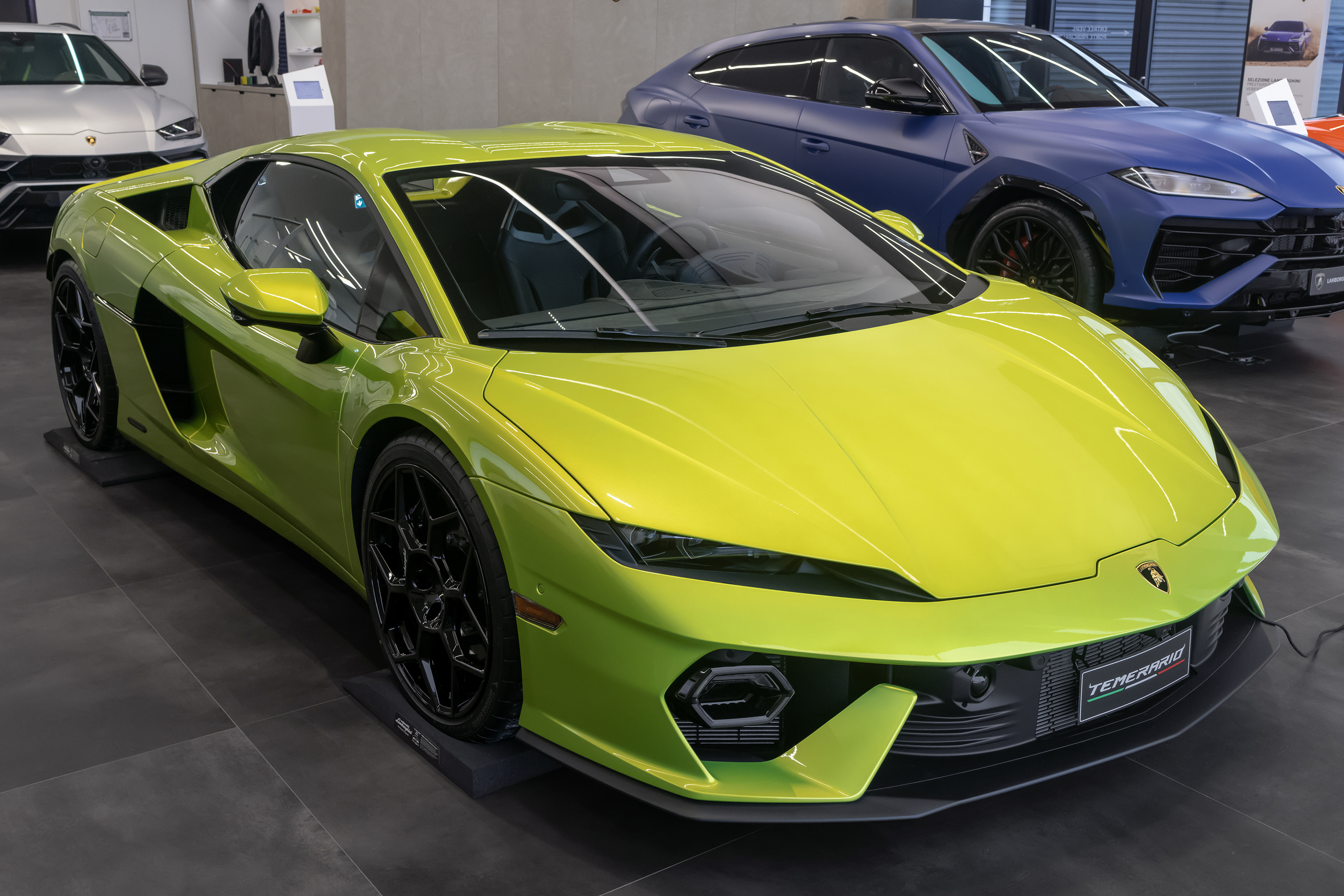
Lamborghini Temerario

The Temerario is a mid-engine plug-in hybrid sports car. It was officially unveiled on 16 August 2024 and is the successor to the Huracán.

- Urus

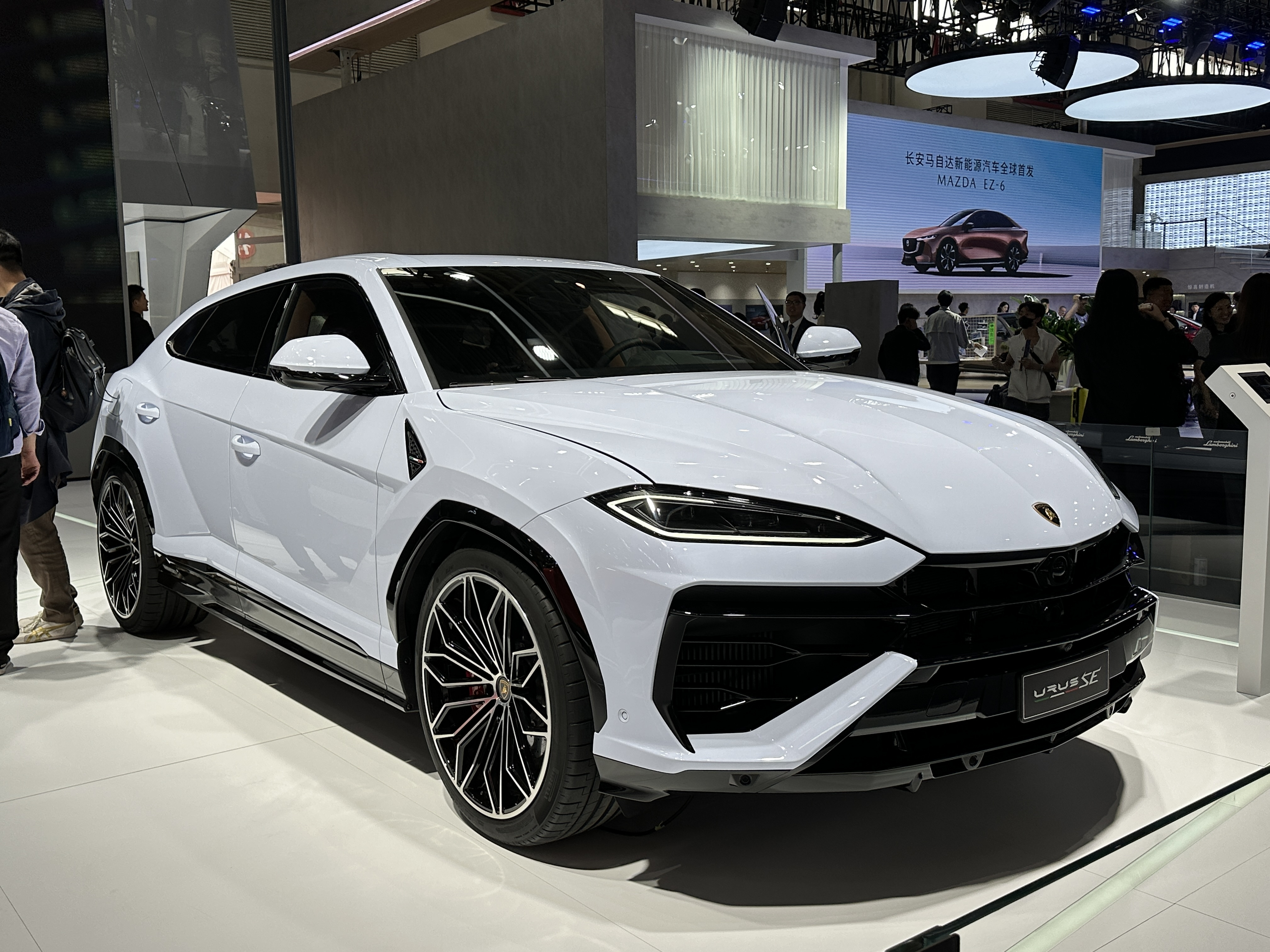
Lamborghini Urus

Intending to double its sales volume by 2019, Lamborghini also added an SUV named Urus in its line-up which is powered by a twin-turbo V8 engine and utilizes a front engine, all-wheel drive layout.

=== Marine engines ===
Motori Marini Lamborghini produces a large V12 marine engine block for use in World Offshore Series Class 1 powerboats. A Lamborghini branded marine engine displaces approximately 8,171 cc (8.2 L) and outputs approximately 940 hp (700 kW).

In 1968, company founder Ferruccio Lamborghini commissioned a Riva Aquarama speedboat powered by a pair of V12 engines from the Lamborghini 350 GT.

=== Lamborghini motorcycle ===
In the mid-1980s, Lamborghini produced a limited-production run of a 1,000 cc (61.0 cu in) sports motorcycle. UK weekly newspaper Motor Cycle News reported in 1994—when featuring an example available through an Essex motorcycle retailer—that 24 examples were produced with a Lamborghini alloy frame having adjustable steering head angle, Kawasaki GPz1000RX engine/transmission unit, Ceriani front forks and Marvic wheels. The bodywork was plastic and fully integrated with front fairing merged into fuel tank and seat cover ending in a rear tail-fairing. The motorcycles were designed by Lamborghini stylists and produced by French business Boxer Bikes.

=== Branded merchandise ===
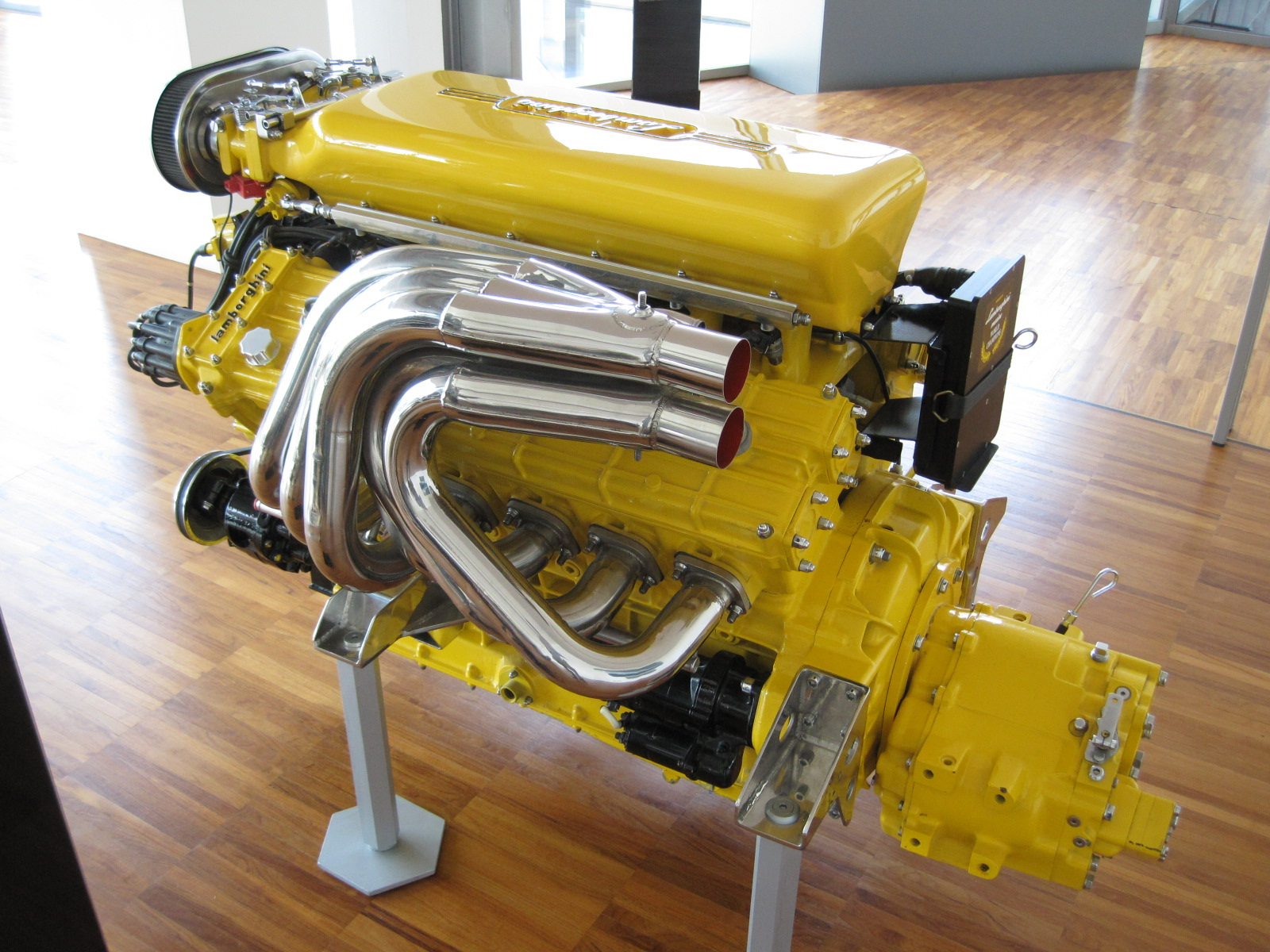
L900 marine engine

Lamborghini licenses its brand to manufacturers that produce a variety of Lamborghini-branded consumer goods including scale models, clothing, accessories, bags, electronics and laptop computers.

== Motorsport ==
Lamborghini Motorsport Division, Squadra Corse
- Trade name: Squadra Corse
- Type: Division
- Industry: Motorsport
- Headquarters: Sant'Agata Bolognese, Italy
- Area served: Worldwide
- Key people: Stephan Winkelmann (CEO of Automobili Lamborghini)
- Parent: Automobili Lamborghini
- Website: lamborghini.com/en-en/motorsport

=== Automobiles produced ===
Lamborghini Motorsport Division Squadra Corse produces GT3 cars and cars for its Super Trofeo events based on the Gallardo and Huracán. Apart from them, the Squadra Corse builds cars upon customer request.

==== GT3 and Super Trofeo cars ====
- Gallardo LP 570-4 Super Trofeo
- Gallardo LP 560-4 Super Trofeo
- Huracán LP 620-2 Super Trofeo
- Huracán LP 620-2 Super Trofeo EVO
- Huracán LP 620-2 Super Trofeo EVO2
- Huracán Super Trofeo GT2
- Huracán GT3
- Huracán GT3 Evo
- Huracán GT3 Evo 2

==== Special cars ====
These cars were built by Squadra Corse upon customer request.

- Essenza SCV12
- SC18 Alston
- SC20

=== Events held ===
==== Lamborghini Super Trofeo ====
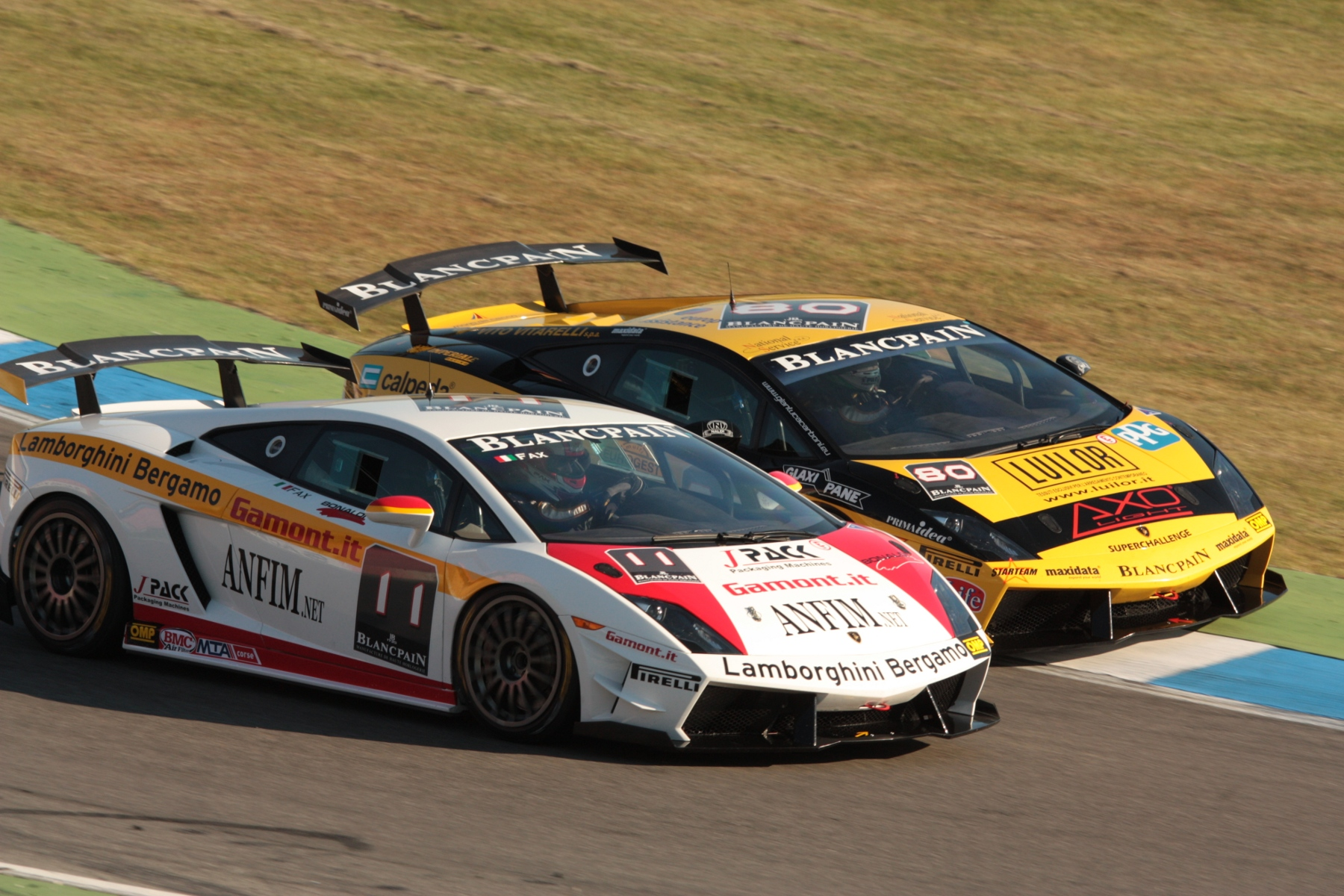
Lamborghini Gallardo Super Trofeo 2011 in Hockenheim

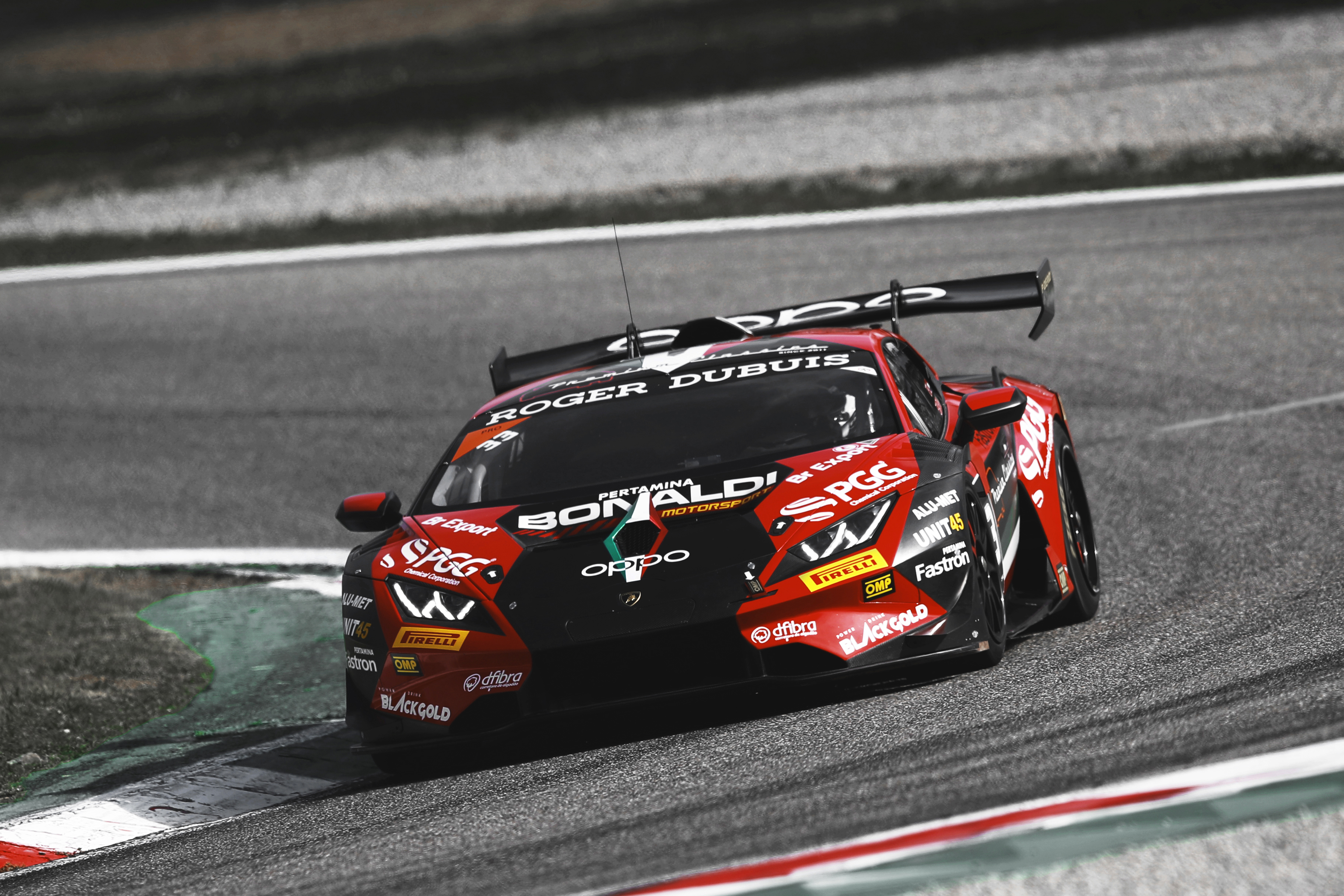
Lamborghini Huracán Super Trofeo

The Super Trofeo is a series of Motorsport events held by Squadra corse using its Super Trofeo model vehicles (currently the Huracán Super Trofeo EVO2) which are racing versions of the road-approved models (Huracán and Gallardo models).

The Super Trofeo events are held in three different series, in three continents: America, Asia and Europe. Many private race teams participate in each of these events.

Every series consists of six rounds, each of which feature free practice sessions, qualifying and two races lasting 50 minutes each. There are four categories of drivers: Pro, Pro-Am, Am and Lamborghini Cup. The season ends in the Lamborghini Super Trofeo World Final.

==== Lamborghini GT3 ====
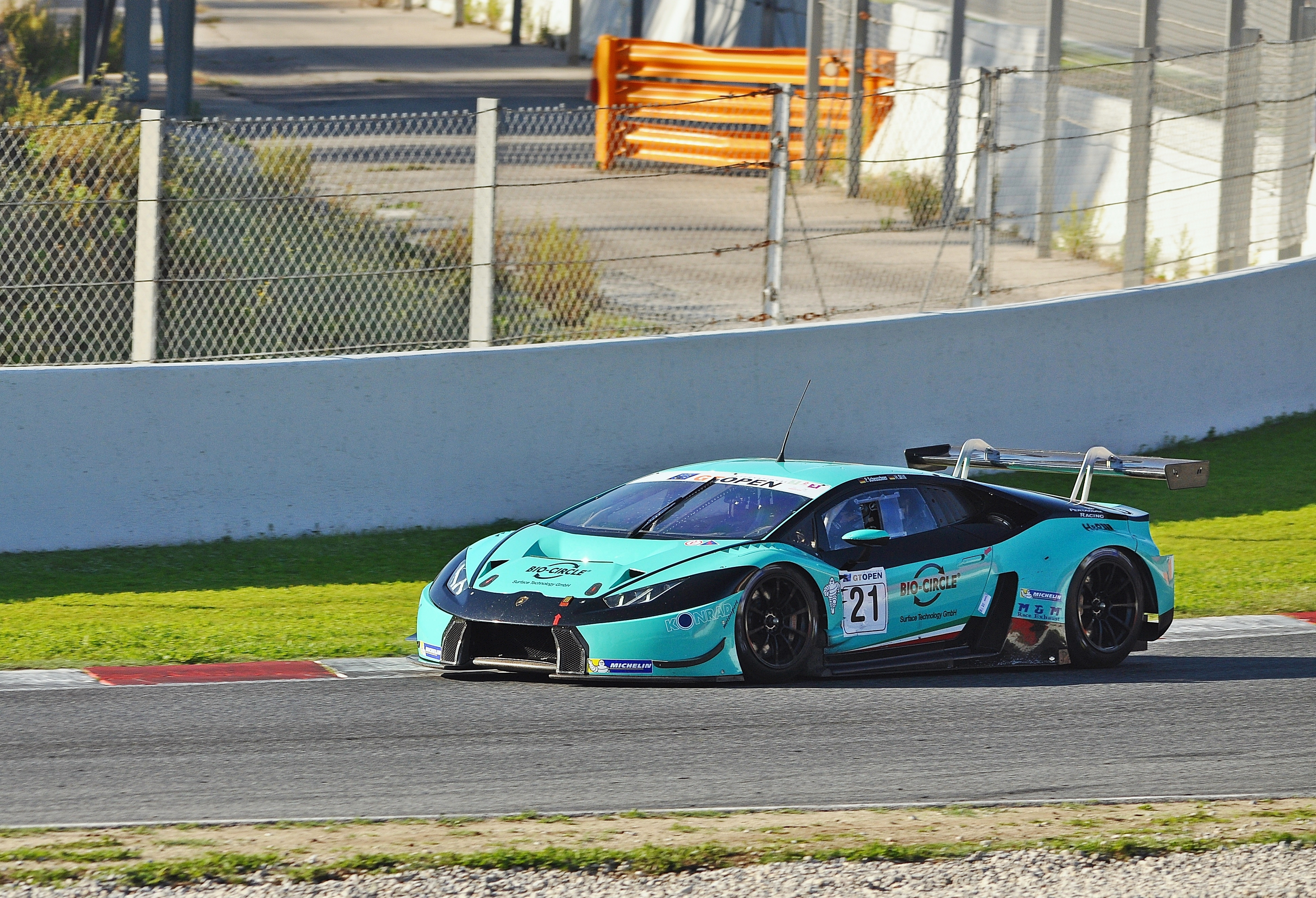
Lamborghini Huracán GT3 front view

The Lamborghini GT3 is a series of Motorsport events held by The Squadra Corse using Huracán GT3 cars that comply with the FIA GT3 regulations. The racing event is open to any Huracán GT3 customer.

Lamborghini currently uses Huracán GT3 Evo 2 cars for these events and more than 60 private race teams participate in these events.

=== Racecars ===
Year	Car	Image	Category
1967	Lamborghini 350 GT		Group 4
1967	Lamborghini 400 GT 2+2		Group 4
1968	Lamborghini P400 Miura		Group 4
1975	Lamborghini Urraco P250		Group 4
1986	Lamborghini Countach QVX		Group C1
1988	Lamborghini Countach 5000QV		Group B
1991	Lambo 291		Formula 1
1998	Lamborghini Diablo 132 GT1		Group GT1
2004	Lamborghini Murciélago R-GT		Group GT
2005	Lamborghini Murciélago RG-1		GT500 GT300
2006	Lamborghini Gallardo LP520 GT3		Group GT3
2007	Lamborghini Gallardo		GT300
2009	Lamborghini Gallardo LP 560 GT2		LM GTE
2010	Lamborghini Gallardo LP600+ GT3		Group GT3
2010	Lamborghini Murciélago LP 670 R-SV		Group GT1
2014	Lamborghini Huracán LP 620-2 Super Trofeo		Lamborghini Super Trofeo
2015	Lamborghini Huracán GT3		Group GT3
2019	Lamborghini Huracán GT3 Evo		Group GT3
2019	Lamborghini Huracán LP 620-2 Super Trofeo EVO		Lamborghini Super Trofeo
2020	Lamborghini Huracán Super Trofeo GT2		SRO GT2
2022	Lamborghini Huracán GT3 Evo 2		Group GT3
2022	Lamborghini Huracán LP 620-2 Super Trofeo EVO2		Lamborghini Super Trofeo
2024	Lamborghini SC63		LMDh
2026	Lamborghini Temerario GT3		Group GT3

== Current factory drivers ==
=== Factory drivers ===
- (Italy) Mirko Bortolotti
- (Italy) Andrea Caldarelli
- (Germany) Christian Engelhart
- (Germany) Luca Engstler
- (France) Romain Grosjean
- (Russia) Daniil Kvyat
- (Italy) Marco Mapelli
- (United Kingdom) Sandy Mitchell
- (Switzerland) Edoardo Mortara
- (South Africa) Jordan Pepper
- (France) Franck Perera
- (Italy) Leonardo Pulcini
- (Italy) Loris Spinelli

=== GT3 Junior drivers ===
- (United Kingdom) Hugo Cook
- (Italy) Andrea Frassineti
- (Germany) Robin Rogalski
- (Portugal) Rodrigo Testa

=== Super Trofeo Junior drivers ===
- (France) Hugo Bac
- (Sweden) Calle Bergman
- (Singapore) Ethan Brown
- (United States) Elias De La Torre
- (Republic of Ireland) Alex Denning
- (Italy) Patrik Fraboni
- (France) Enzo Geraci
- (Macau) Charles Leong Hon Chio
- (France) Paul Levet
- (Italy) Guido Luchetti
- (United States) Al Morey IV
- (South Africa) Anthony Pretorius
- (United States) Colin Queen
- (Denmark) Silas Rytter
- (Germany) Pablo Schumm
- (Poland) Jerzy Spinkiewicz

== Lamborghini in Formula One ==
Lamborghini as a Formula One engine manufacturer
- Notable staff: Mauro Forghieri

Formula One World Championship career
- First entry: 1989 Brazilian Grand Prix
- Last entry: 1993 Australian Grand Prix
- Races entered: 80
- Chassis: Lola, Lotus, Lambo, Ligier, Minardi, Venturi, Larrousse
- Constructors' Championships: 0
- Drivers' Championships: 0
- Race victories: 0
- Podiums: 1
- Points: 20
- Pole positions: 0
- Fastest laps: 0

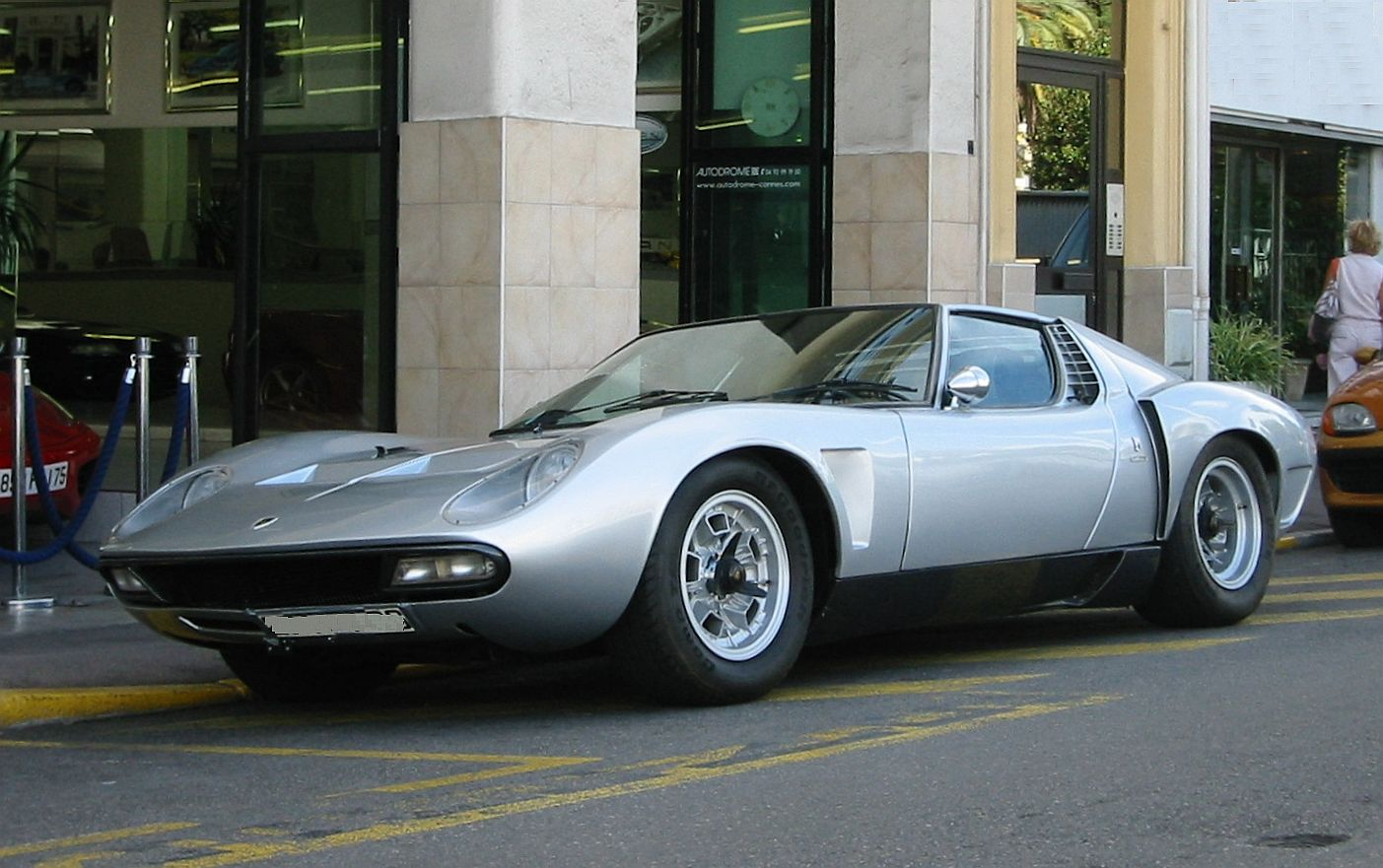
The Miura began as a clandestine prototype, a car that had racing potential in a company that was entirely against motorsport.

In contrast to his rival Enzo Ferrari, Ferruccio Lamborghini had decided early on that there would be no factory-supported racing of Lamborghinis, viewing motorsport as too expensive and too draining on company resources. This was unusual for the time, as many sports car manufacturers sought to demonstrate speed, reliability, and technical superiority through motorsport participation. Enzo Ferrari in particular was known for considering his road car business mostly a source of funding for his participation in motor racing. Ferruccio's policy led to tensions between him and his engineers, many of whom were racing enthusiasts; some had previously worked at Ferrari. When Dallara, Stanzani, and Wallace began dedicating their spare time to the development of the P400 prototype, they designed it to be a road car with racing potential, one that could win on the track and also be driven on the road by enthusiasts. When Ferruccio discovered the project, he allowed them to go ahead, seeing it as a potential marketing device for the company, while insisting that it would not be raced. The P400 went on to become the Miura. The closest the company came to building a true race car under Lamborghini's supervision were a few highly modified prototypes, including those built by factory test driver Bob Wallace, such as the Miura SV-based "Jota" and the Jarama S-based "Bob Wallace Special".

In the mid-1970s, while Lamborghini was under the management of Georges-Henri Rossetti, Lamborghini entered into an agreement with BMW to develop, then manufacture 400 cars for BMW in order to meet Group 4 homologation requirements. BMW lacked experience developing a mid-engined vehicle and believed that Lamborghini's experience in that area would make Lamborghini an ideal choice of partner. Due to Lamborghini's shaky finances, Lamborghini fell behind schedule developing the car's structure and running gear. When Lamborghini failed to deliver working prototypes on time, BMW took the program in house, finishing development without Lamborghini. BMW contracted with Baur to produce the car, which BMW named the M1, delivering the first vehicle in October 1978.

In 1985, Lamborghini's British importer developed the Countach QVX, in conjunction with Spice Engineering, for the 1986 Group C championship season. One car was built, but lack of sponsorship caused it to miss the season. The QVX competed in only one race, the non-championship 1986 Southern Suns 500 km race at Kyalami in South Africa, driven by Tiff Needell. Despite the car finishing better than it started, sponsorship could once again not be found and the programme was cancelled.

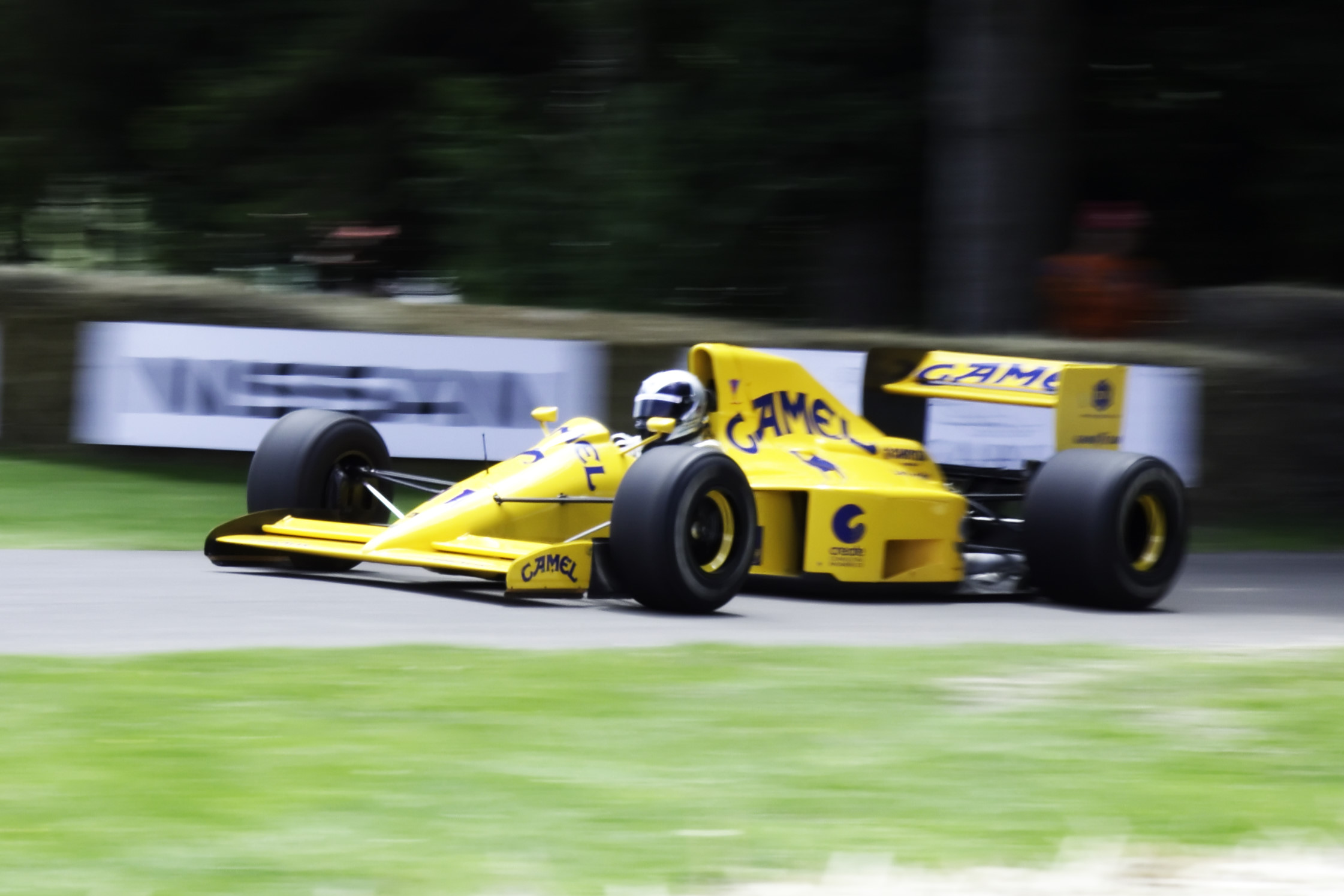
The 1990 Lotus 102 featured a Lamborghini V12 engine.

Lamborghini was an engine supplier in Formula One for the 1989 through 1993 Formula One seasons. It supplied engines to Larrousse (1989–1990, 1992–1993), Lotus (1990), Ligier (1991), Minardi (1992), and to the Modena team in 1991. While the latter is commonly referred to as a factory team, the company saw itself as a supplier, not a backer. The 1992 Larrousse—Lamborghini was largely uncompetitive but noteworthy in its tendency to spew oil from its exhaust system. Cars following closely behind the Larrousse were commonly coloured yellowish-brown by the end of the race. Lamborghini's best result was achieved with Larrousse at the 1990 Japanese Grand Prix, when Aguri Suzuki finished third on home soil.

In 1991, a Lamborghini Formula One motor was used in the Konrad KM-011 Group C sports car, but the car only lasted a few races before the project was cancelled. The same engine, re-badged a Chrysler, Lamborghini's then-parent company, was tested by McLaren towards the end of the 1993 season, with the intent of using it during the 1994 season. Although driver Ayrton Senna was reportedly impressed with the engine's performance, McLaren pulled out of negotiations, choosing a Peugeot engine instead, and Chrysler ended the project.

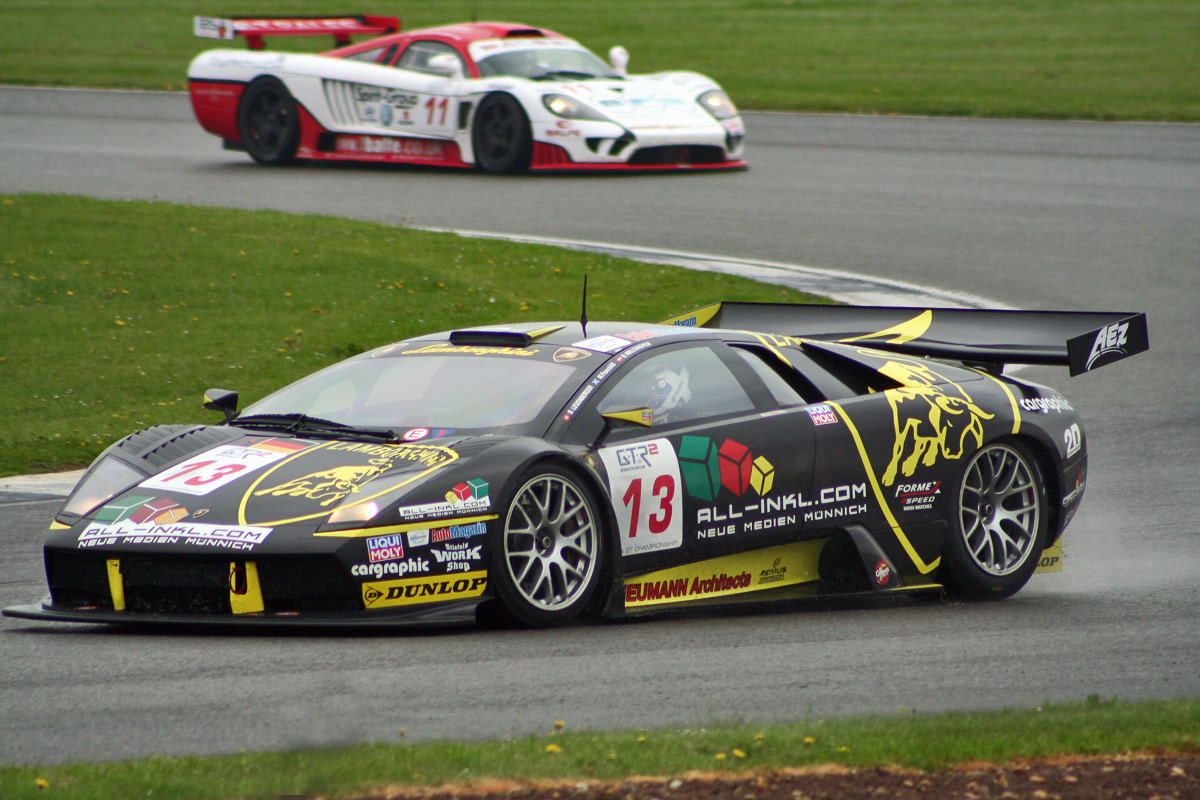
A Murciélago R-GT participating in the FIA GT Championship at Silverstone in 2006

Two racing versions of the Diablo were built for the Diablo Supertrophy, a single-model racing series held annually from 1996 to 1999. In the first year, the model used in the series was the Diablo SVR, while the Diablo 6.0 GTR was used for the remaining three years. Lamborghini developed the Murciélago R-GT as a production racing car to compete in the FIA GT Championship, the Super GT Championship and the American Le Mans Series in 2004. The car's highest placing in any race that year was the opening round of the FIA GT Championship at Valencia, where the car entered by Reiter Engineering finished third from a fifth-place start. In 2006, during the opening round of the Super GT championship at Suzuka, a car run by the Japan Lamborghini Owners Club garnered the first victory (in class) by an R-GT. A GT3 version of the Gallardo has been developed by Reiter Engineering. A Murciélago R-GT entered by All-Inkl.com racing, driven by Christophe Bouchut and Stefan Mücke, won the opening round of the FIA GT Championship held at Zhuhai International Circuit, achieving the first major international race victory for Lamborghini.

=== Complete Formula One results ===
(key) (results in bold indicate pole position)

Year	Entrant	Chassis	Engine(s)	Tyres	Drivers	1	2	3	4	5	6	7	8	9	10	11	12	13	14	15	16	Points	WCC
1989	Larrousse Calmels	Lola LC88B; Lola LC89	Lamborghini 3512 V12	G		BRA	SMR	MON	MEX	US	CAN	FRA	GBR	GER	HUN	BEL	ITA	POR	ESP	JPN	AUS	1	15th
1989	Larrousse Calmels	Lola LC88B; Lola LC89	Lamborghini 3512 V12	G	(France) Yannick Dalmas	DNQ	Ret	DNQ	DNQ	DNQ	DNQ											1	15th
1989	Larrousse Calmels	Lola LC88B; Lola LC89	Lamborghini 3512 V12	G	(France) Éric Bernard							11	Ret									1	15th
1989	Larrousse Calmels	Lola LC88B; Lola LC89	Lamborghini 3512 V12	G	(Italy) Michele Alboreto									Ret	Ret	Ret	Ret	11	DNPQ	DNQ	DNPQ	1	15th
1989	Larrousse Calmels	Lola LC88B; Lola LC89	Lamborghini 3512 V12	G	(France) Philippe Alliot	12	Ret	Ret	Ret	Ret	Ret	Ret	Ret	Ret	DNPQ	16	Ret	9	6	Ret	Ret	1	15th
1990	ESPO Larrousse F1	Lola LC89B; Lola LC90	Lamborghini 3512 V12	G		US	BRA	SMR	MON	CAN	MEX	FRA	GBR	GER	HUN	BEL	ITA	POR	ESP	JPN	AUS	11	6th
1990	ESPO Larrousse F1	Lola LC89B; Lola LC90	Lamborghini 3512 V12	G	(France) Éric Bernard	8	Ret	13	6	9	Ret	8	4	Ret	6	9	Ret	Ret	Ret	Ret	Ret	11	6th
1990	ESPO Larrousse F1	Lola LC89B; Lola LC90	Lamborghini 3512 V12	G	(Japan) Aguri Suzuki	Ret	Ret	Ret	Ret	12	Ret	7	6	Ret	Ret	Ret	Ret	14	6	3	Ret	11	6th
1990	Camel Team Lotus	Lotus 102	Lamborghini V12	G																			
1990	Camel Team Lotus	Lotus 102	Lamborghini V12	G	(United Kingdom) Derek Warwick	Ret	Ret	7	Ret	6	10	11	Ret	8	5	11	Ret	Ret	Ret	Ret	Ret	3	8th
1990	Camel Team Lotus	Lotus 102	Lamborghini V12	G	(United Kingdom) Martin Donnelly	DNS	Ret	8	Ret	Ret	8	12	Ret	Ret	7	12	Ret	Ret	DNS			3	8th
1990	Camel Team Lotus	Lotus 102	Lamborghini V12	G	(United Kingdom) Johnny Herbert															Ret	Ret	3	8th
1991	Equipe Ligier Gitanes	Ligier JS35; Ligier JS35B	Lamborghini 3512; V12	G		US	BRA	SMR	MON	CAN	MEX	FRA	GBR	GER	HUN	BEL	ITA	POR	ESP	JPN	AUS	0	NC
1991	Equipe Ligier Gitanes	Ligier JS35; Ligier JS35B	Lamborghini 3512; V12	G	(Belgium) Thierry Boutsen	Ret	Ret	7	7	Ret	8	12	Ret	9	17	11	Ret	16	Ret	9	Ret	0	NC
1991	Equipe Ligier Gitanes	Ligier JS35; Ligier JS35B	Lamborghini 3512; V12	G	(France) Érik Comas	DNQ	Ret	10	10	8	DNQ	11	DNQ	Ret	10	Ret	11	11	Ret	Ret	18	0	NC
1991	Modena Team SpA	Lambo 291	Lamborghini L3512 V12	G	(Italy) Nicola Larini	7	DNPQ	DNPQ	DNPQ	DNPQ	DNPQ	DNPQ	DNPQ	Ret	16	DNQ	16	DNQ	DNQ	DNQ	Ret	0	NC
1991	Modena Team SpA	Lambo 291	Lamborghini L3512 V12	G	(Belgium) Eric van de Poele	DNPQ	DNPQ	9	DNPQ	DNPQ	DNPQ	DNPQ	DNPQ	DNQ	DNQ	DNQ	DNQ	DNQ	DNQ	DNQ	DNQ	0	NC
1992	Central Park Venturi Larrousse	Venturi LC92	Lamborghini 3512 V12	G		RSA	MEX	BRA	ESP	SMR	MON	CAN	FRA	GBR	GER	HUN	BEL	ITA	POR	JPN	AUS	1	11th
1992	Central Park Venturi Larrousse	Venturi LC92	Lamborghini 3512 V12	G	(France) Bertrand Gachot	Ret	11	Ret	Ret	Ret	6	DSQ	Ret	Ret	14	Ret	18	Ret	Ret	Ret	Ret	1	11th
1992	Central Park Venturi Larrousse	Venturi LC92	Lamborghini 3512 V12	G	(Japan) Ukyo Katayama	12	12	9	DNQ	Ret	DNPQ	Ret	Ret	Ret	Ret	Ret	17	9	Ret	11	Ret	1	11th
1992	Minardi Team	M191B; M191L; M192	Lamborghini 3512 3.5 V12	G	(Brazil) Christian Fittipaldi	Ret	Ret	Ret	11	Ret	8	13	DNQ				DNQ	DNQ	12	6	**9**	1	12th
1992	Minardi Team	M191B; M191L; M192	Lamborghini 3512 3.5 V12	G	(Italy) Alessandro Zanardi									DNQ	Ret	DNQ						1	12th
1992	Minardi Team	M191B; M191L; M192	Lamborghini 3512 3.5 V12	G	(Italy) Gianni Morbidelli	Ret	Ret	7	Ret	Ret	Ret	11	8	17	12	DNQ	16	Ret	14	14	10	1	12th
1993	Larrousse F1	Larrousse LH93	Lamborghini 3512 V12	G		RSA	BRA	EUR	SMR	ESP	MON	CAN	FRA	GBR	GER	HUN	BEL	ITA	POR	JPN	AUS	3	10th
1993	Larrousse F1	Larrousse LH93	Lamborghini 3512 V12	G	(France) Philippe Alliot	Ret	7	Ret	5	Ret	12	Ret	9	11	12	8	12	9	10			3	10th
1993	Larrousse F1	Larrousse LH93	Lamborghini 3512 V12	G	(Japan) Toshio Suzuki															12	14	3	10th
1993	Larrousse F1	Larrousse LH93	Lamborghini 3512 V12	G	(France) Érik Comas	Ret	10	9	Ret	9	Ret	8	16	Ret	Ret	Ret	Ret	6	11	Ret	12	3	10th

== Marketing ==
=== Brand identity ===
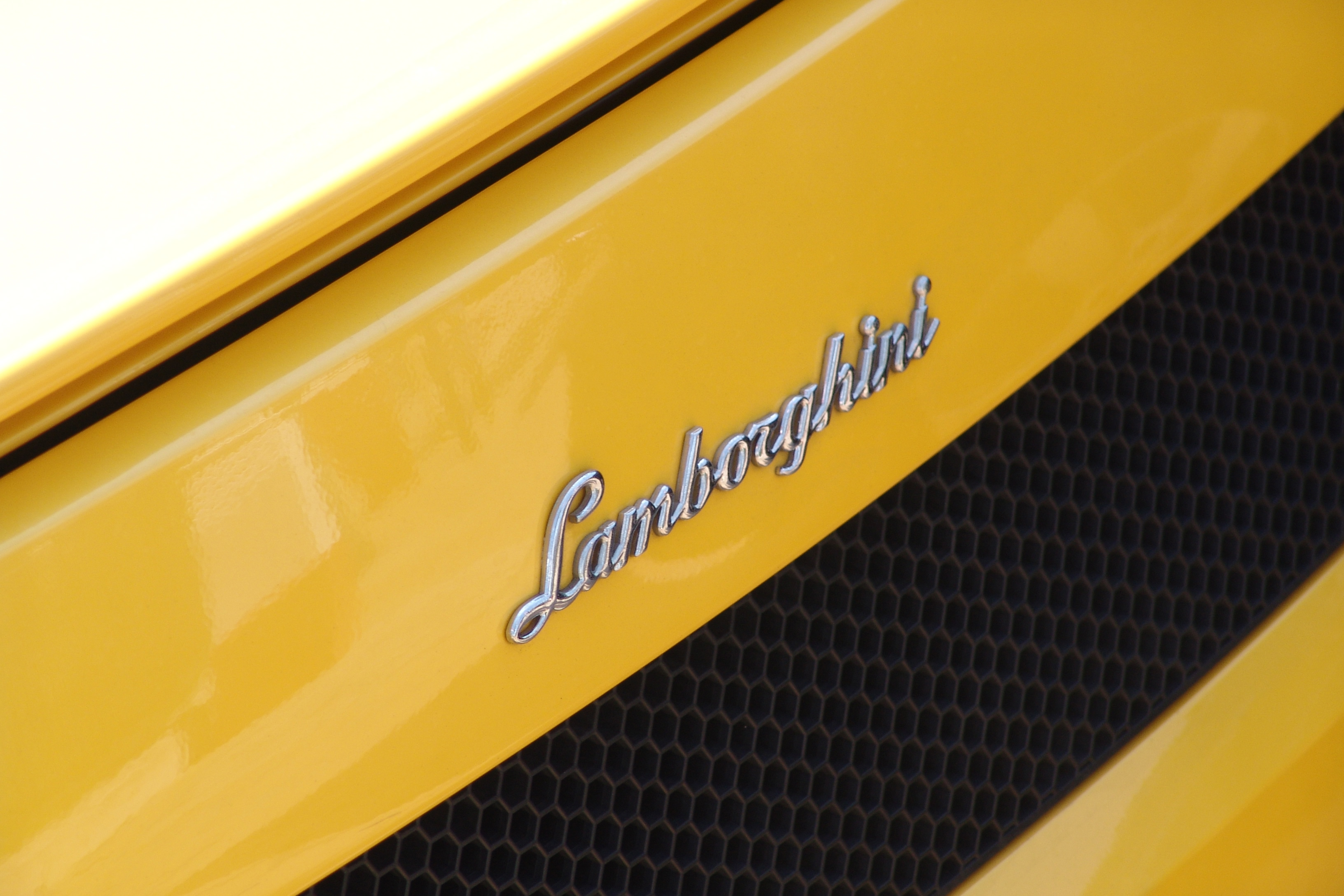
The Lamborghini wordmark, as displayed on the back of its cars

The world of bullfighting is a key part of Lamborghini's identity. In 1962, Ferruccio Lamborghini visited the Seville ranch of Don Eduardo Miura, a renowned breeder of Spanish fighting bulls. Lamborghini was so impressed by the majestic Miura animals that he decided to adopt a raging bull as the emblem for the automaker he would open shortly.

=== Branded Residences ===
Lamborghini is diversifying its brand identity into Branded Residences. Tierra Viva By Lamborghini is the new luxury branded residences project inspired by Automobili Lamborghini. It is located in Spain´s Costa del Sol and is expected to be completed in June 2027.

=== Vehicle nomenclature ===
After producing two cars with alphanumeric designations, Lamborghini once again turned to the bull breeder for inspiration. Don Eduardo was filled with pride when he learned that Ferruccio had named a car for his family and their line of bulls; the fourth Miura to be produced was unveiled to him at his ranch in Seville.

The automaker would continue to draw upon the bullfighting connection in future years. The Islero was named for the Miura bull that killed the famed bullfighter Manolete in 1947. Espada is the Spanish word for sword, sometimes used to refer to the bullfighter himself. The Jarama's name carried a special double meaning; though it was intended to refer only to the historic bullfighting region in Spain, Ferruccio was concerned about confusion with the also historic Jarama motor racing track.

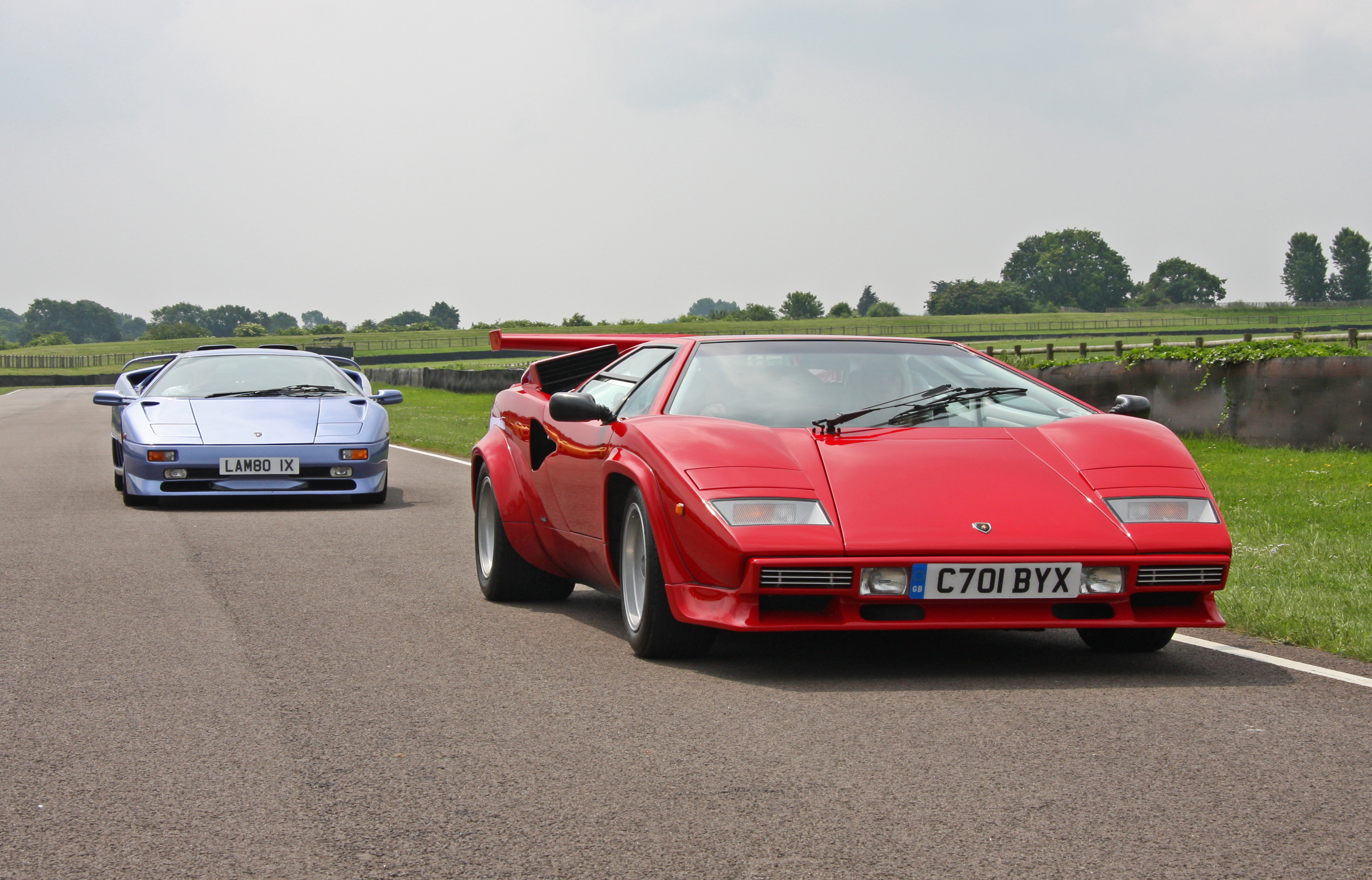
The Diablo (background) was named for a legendary bull, while the Countach (foreground) broke from the bullfighting tradition.

After christening the Urraco after a bull breed, in 1974, Lamborghini broke from tradition, naming the Countach (/ˈkuːntɑːʃ/ KOON-tahsh) not for a bull, but for contacc (pronounced [kʊŋˈtɑtʃ]), a Piedmontese expletive. Legend has it that Nuccio Bertone uttered the word in surprise when he first saw the Countach prototype, "Project 112". The LM002 (LM for Lamborghini Militaire) sport utility vehicle and the Silhouette (named after the popular racing category of the time) were other exceptions to the tradition.

The Jalpa of 1982 was named for a bull breed; Diablo, for the Duke of Veragua's ferocious bull famous for fighting an epic battle against El Chicorro in Madrid in 1869; Murciélago, the legendary bull whose life was spared by El Lagartijo for his performance in 1879; Gallardo, named for one of the five ancestral castes of the Spanish fighting bull breed; and Reventón, the bull that defeated young Mexican torero Félix Guzmán in 1943. The Estoque concept of 2008 was named for the estoc, the sword traditionally used by matadors during bullfights.

=== Concept vehicles ===
Throughout its history, Lamborghini has envisioned and presented a variety of concept cars, beginning in 1963 with the first Lamborghini prototype, the 350GTV. Other famous models include Bertone's 1967 Marzal, 1974 Bravo, and 1980 Athon, Chrysler's 1987 Portofino, the Italdesign-styled Cala from 1995, the Zagato-built Raptor from 1996.

A retro-styled Lamborghini Miura concept car, the first creation of chief designer Walter de'Silva, was presented in 2006. President and CEO Stephan Winkelmann denied that the concept would be put into production, saying that the Miura concept was "a celebration of our history, but Lamborghini is about the future. Retro design is not what we are here for. So we won't do the [new] Miura."

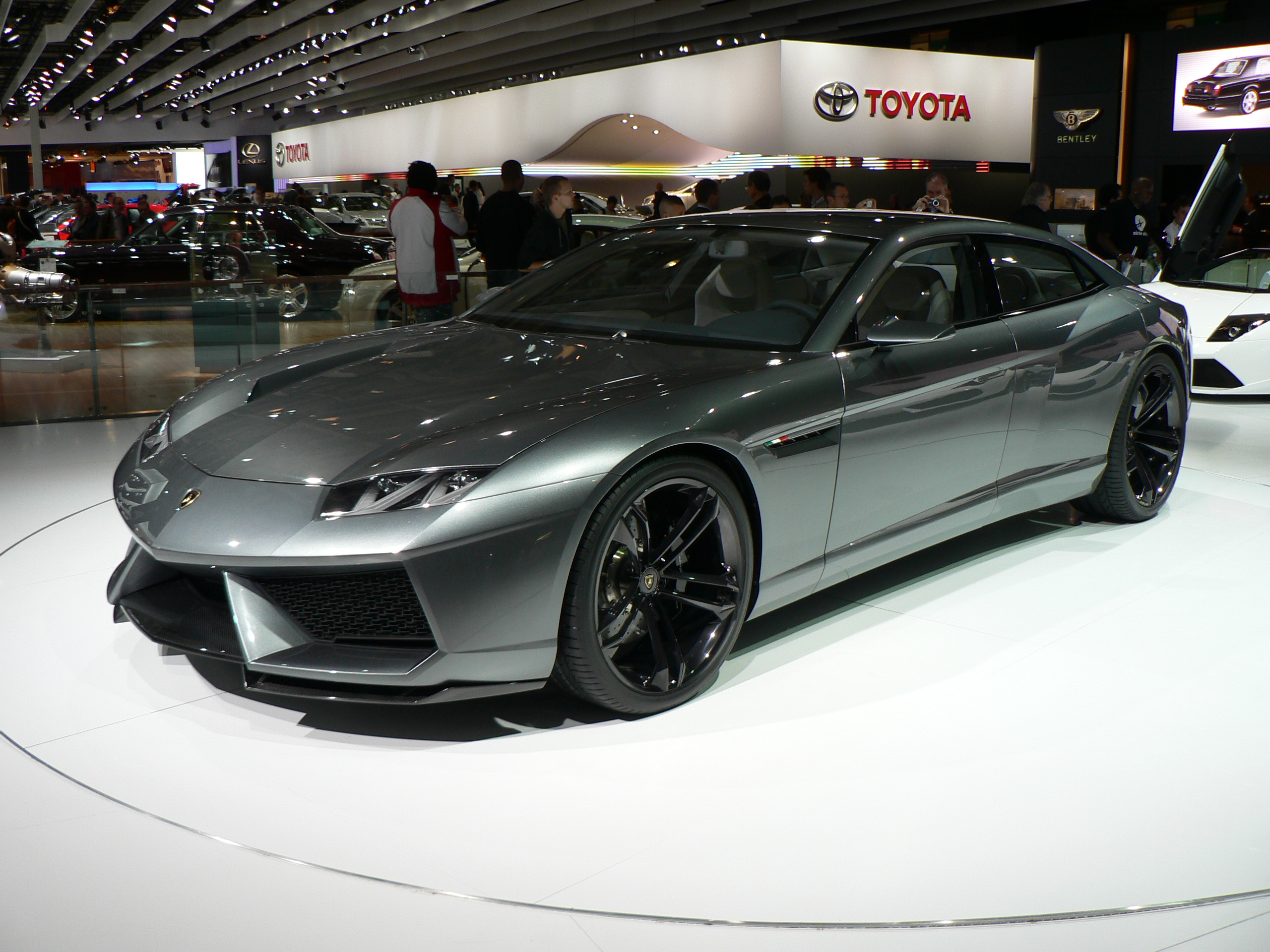
The Estoque, a 2008 sedan concept

At the 2008 Paris Motor Show, Lamborghini revealed the Estoque, a four-door sedan concept. Although there had been much speculation regarding the Estoque's eventual production, Lamborghini management has not made a decision regarding production of what might be the first four-door car to roll out of the Sant'Agata factory.

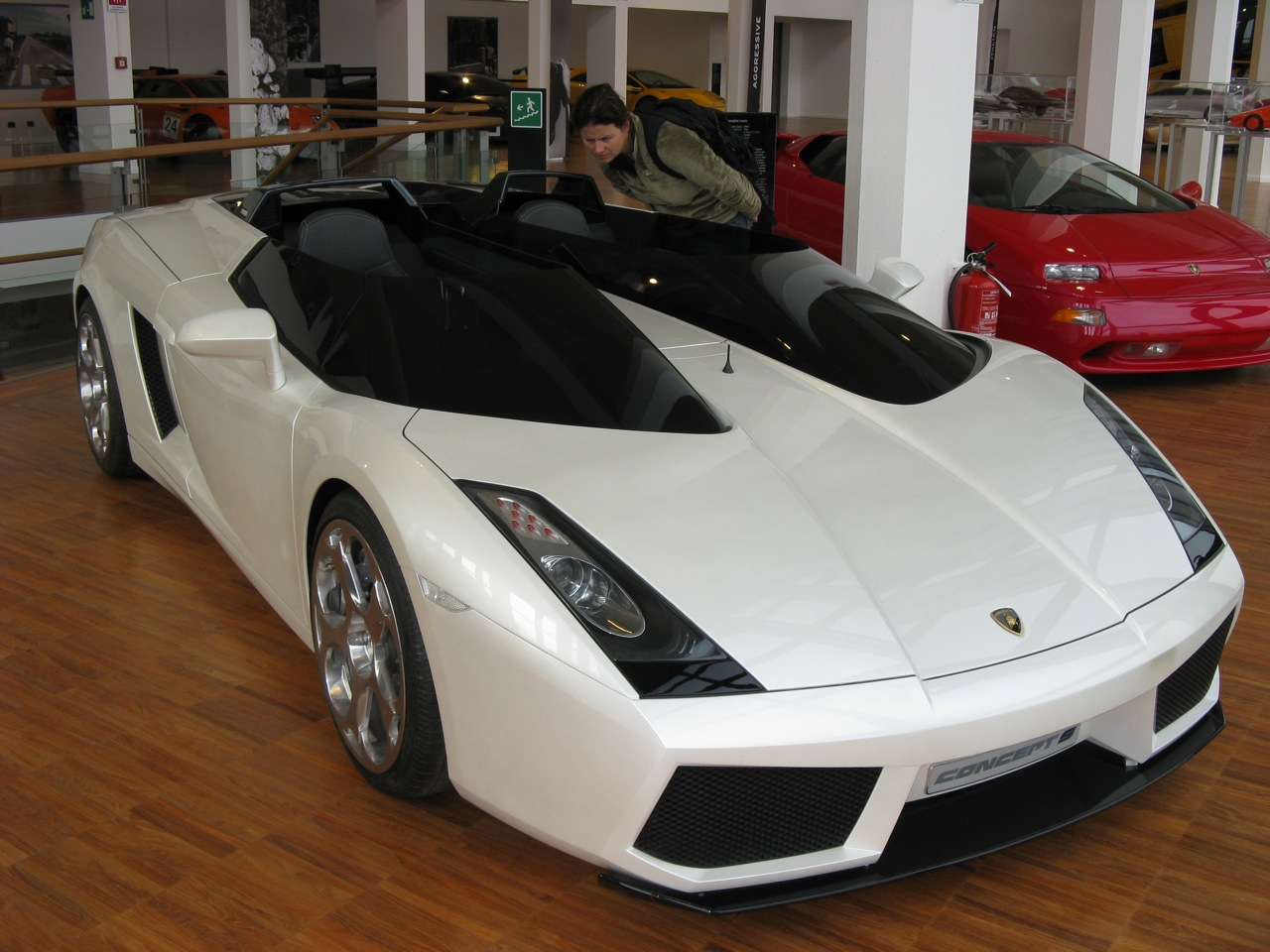
The Concept S, a Gallardo derivative

At the 2010 Paris Motor Show, Lamborghini unveiled the Sesto Elemento. The concept car is made almost entirely of carbon fibre making it extremely light, with a weight of 999 kg (2,202 lb). The Sesto Elemento shares the same V10 engine found in the Lamborghini Gallardo. Lamborghini hopes to signal a shift in the company's direction from making super cars focused on top speed to producing more agile, track focused cars with the Sesto Elemento. The concept car can reach 0–62 mph (0–100 km/h) in 2.5 seconds and can reach a top speed of over 180 mph (290 km/h).

At the 2012 Geneva Motor Show, Lamborghini unveiled the Aventador J—a roofless, windowless version of the Lamborghini Aventador. The Aventador J uses the same 700 hp engine and seven-speed transmission as the standard Aventador.

At the 2012 Beijing Motor Show, Lamborghini unveiled the Urus SUV. This is the first SUV built by Lamborghini since the LM002.

As part of the celebration of 50 years of Lamborghini, the company created the Egoista. Egoista is for one person's driving and only one Egoista is to be made.

At the 2014 Paris Motor Show, Lamborghini unveiled the Asterion LPI910-4 hybrid concept car. Named after the half-man, half-bull hybrid (Minotaur) of Greek legend, it is the first hybrid Lamborghini in the history of the company. Utilizing the Huracán's 5.2 litre V10 producing 607 hp (453 kW; 615 PS), along with one electric motor mounted on the transaxle and an additional two on the front axle, developing an additional 300 hp (224 kW; 304 PS). This puts the power at a combined figure of 907 hp (676 kW; 920 PS). The 0–100 km/h (0–62 mph) time is claimed to be just above 3 seconds, with a claimed top speed of 185 mph (298 km/h).

== Corporate affairs ==
=== Structure ===
As of 2011, Lamborghini is structured as a wholly owned subsidiary of Audi AG named Automobili Lamborghini S.p.A. (Note: According to Audi AG's 2011 Annual Financial Report, on 1 July 2011, Automobili Lamborghini S.p.A., Lamborghini AntiMarca S.p.A. and STAR Design S.R.L. were merged into Automobili Lamborghini Holding S.p.A., which was renamed Automobili Lamborghini S.p.A. (S.p.A. stands for Società per Azioni, the Italian designation for a joint stock company. S.R.L. stands for Società a Responsabilità Limitata, the Italian designation for a private limited company).)

Automobili Lamborghini S.p.A. controls five principal subsidiaries: Ducati Motor Holding S.p.A., a manufacturer of motorcycles; Italdesign Giugiaro S.p.A., a design and prototyping firm that provides services to the entire Volkswagen Group; MML S.p.A. (Motori Marini Lamborghini), a manufacturer of marine engine blocks; and Volkswagen Group Italia S.p.A. (formerly Autogerma S.p.A.), which sells Audi and other Volkswagen Group vehicles in Italy.

The Lamborghini headquarters and main production site is located in Sant'Agata Bolognese, Italy. With the launch of its Urus SUV, the production site expanded from 80,000 m^{2} (8.0 ha) to 160,000 m^{2} (16 ha).

On 13 November 2020, Stephan Winkelmann, current President of Bugatti, was appointed to be the new CEO of Lamborghini. He took his new position on 1 December 2020.

=== List of previous CEOs ===
- Ferrucio Lamborghini (1963–1972)
- Georges-Henri Rossetti (1972–1977)
- Jean-Claude Mimran and Patrick Mimran (1980–1986)
- Emile Novaro (1987–1993)
- Vittorio Di Capua (1996–1999)
  - Rodolfo Rocchio (Co-CEO 1998–1999)
- Franz-Josef Paefgen (1999–2001)
- Giuseppe Greco (2001–2005)
- Stephan Winkelmann (2005–2016)
- Stefano Domenicali (2016–2020)

=== Sales results ===
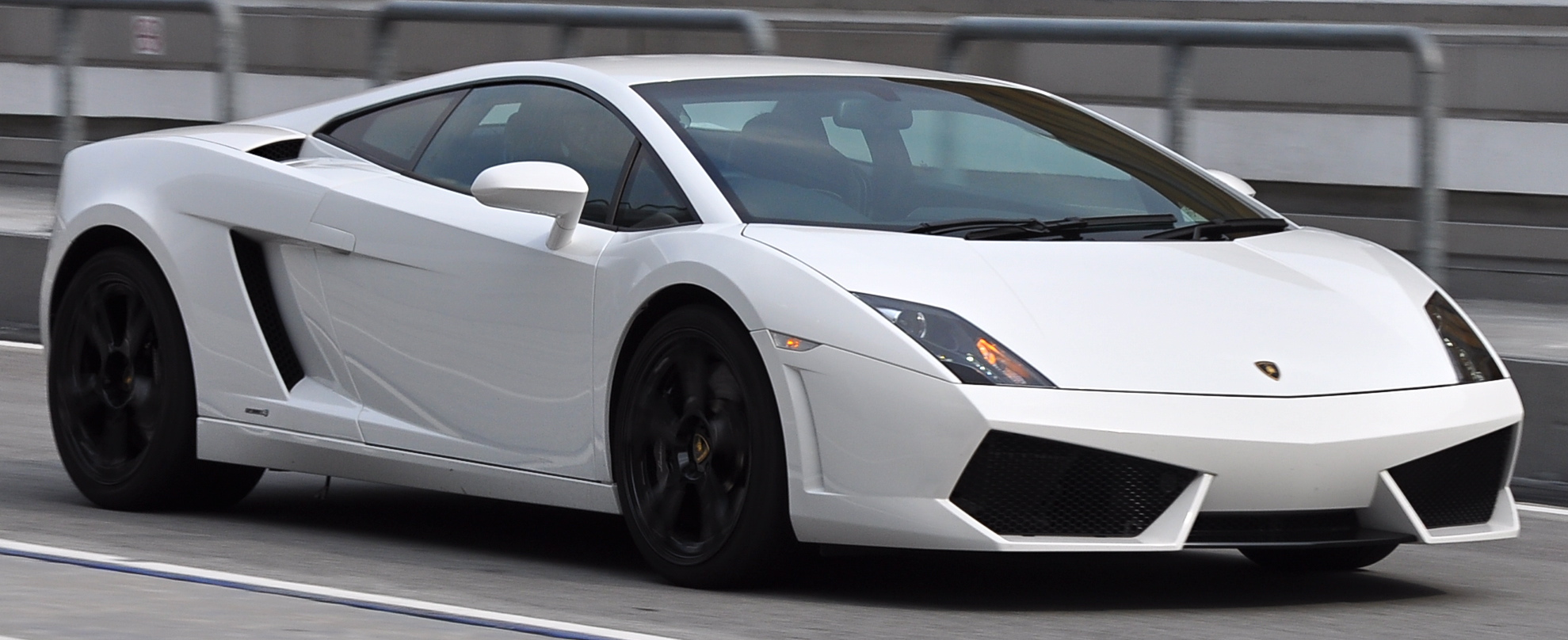
Lamborghini Gallardo coupe (Japan)

By sales, the most important markets in 2004 for Lamborghini's sports cars were the U.S. (41%), Germany (13%), Great Britain (9%) and Japan (8%). Prior to the launch of the Gallardo in 2003, Lamborghini produced approximately 400 vehicles per year; in 2011 Lamborghini produced 1,711 vehicles.

Annual Lamborghini new car sales

Year	Sales
1968	353
	Data missing
1991	673
1992	166
1993	215
	Data missing
1996	211
1997	209
	Data missing
1999	265

Year	Sales
2000	296
2001	297
2002	424
2003	1,305
2004	1,592
2005	1,600
2006	2,087
2007	2,406
2008	2,430
2009	1,515

Year	Sales
2010	1,302
2011	1,602
2012	2,083
2013	2,121
2014	2,530
2015	3,245
2016	3,457
2017	3,815
2018	5,750
2019	8,205

Year	Sales
2020	7,430
2021	8,405
2022	9,233
2023	10,112
2024	10,687
2025	10,747

Annual Lamborghini new car sales

== Licensing ==
=== Automóviles Lamborghini Latinoamérica ===
Automóviles Lamborghini Latinoamérica S.A. de C.V. (Lamborghini Automobiles of Latin America Public Limited Company) is an authorized distributor and manufacturer of Lamborghini-branded vehicles and merchandise in Latin America and South America.

In 1995, Indonesian corporation MegaTech, Lamborghini's owner at the time, entered into distribution and license agreements with Mexican businessman Jorge Antonio Fernández García. The agreements give Automóviles Lamborghini Latinoamérica S.A. de C.V. the exclusive distributorship of Lamborghini vehicles and branded merchandise in Latin America and South America. Under the agreements, Automóviles Lamborghini is also allowed to manufacture Lamborghini vehicles and market them worldwide under the Lamborghini brand.

Automóviles Lamborghini has produced two rebodied versions of the Diablo called the Eros and the Coatl. In 2015, Automóviles Lamborghini transferred the IP-rights to the Coatl foundation (chamber of commerce no. 63393700) in The Netherlands in order to secure these rights and to make them more marketable. The company has announced the production of a speedboat called the Lamborghini Glamour.

== Museums ==
There are two museums in Bologna, Emilia-Romagna, centered around the brand.

=== Museo Lamborghini ===
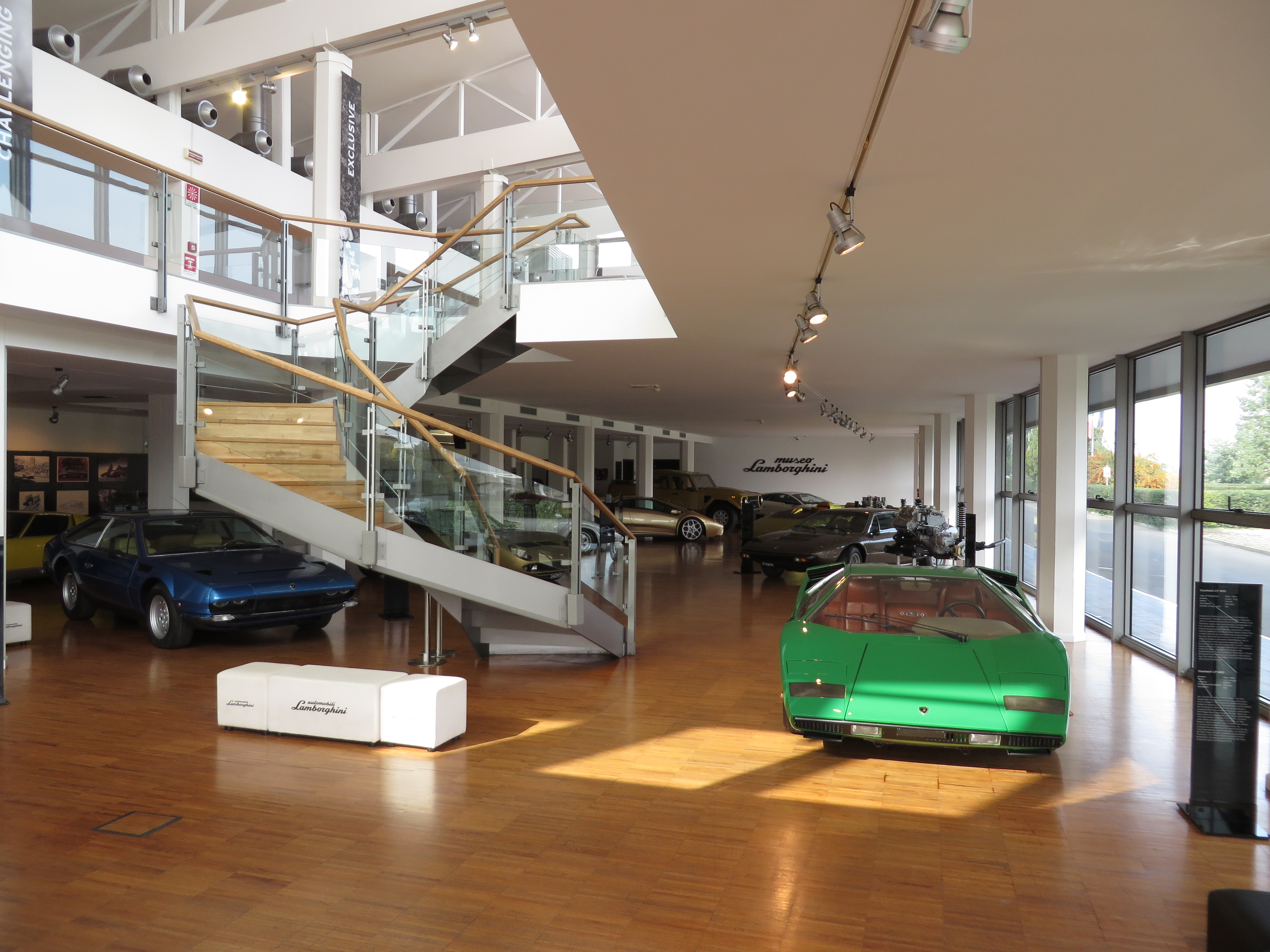
Museo Lamborghini

This two-storey museum is attached to the headquarters, and covers the history of Lamborghini cars and sport utility vehicles, showcasing a variety of modern and vintage models. The museum uses displays of cars, engines and photos to provide a history and review important milestones of Lamborghini.

=== Museo Ferruccio Lamborghini ===
A 9,000 square-foot museum about Ferruccio Lamborghini houses several cars, industrial prototypes, sketches, personal objects and family photos from Ferruccio's early life.

== See also ==
- Automotive industry in Italy
- List of automobile manufacturers of Italy
- List of companies of Italy
