= Stephan Winkelmann =

German businessman

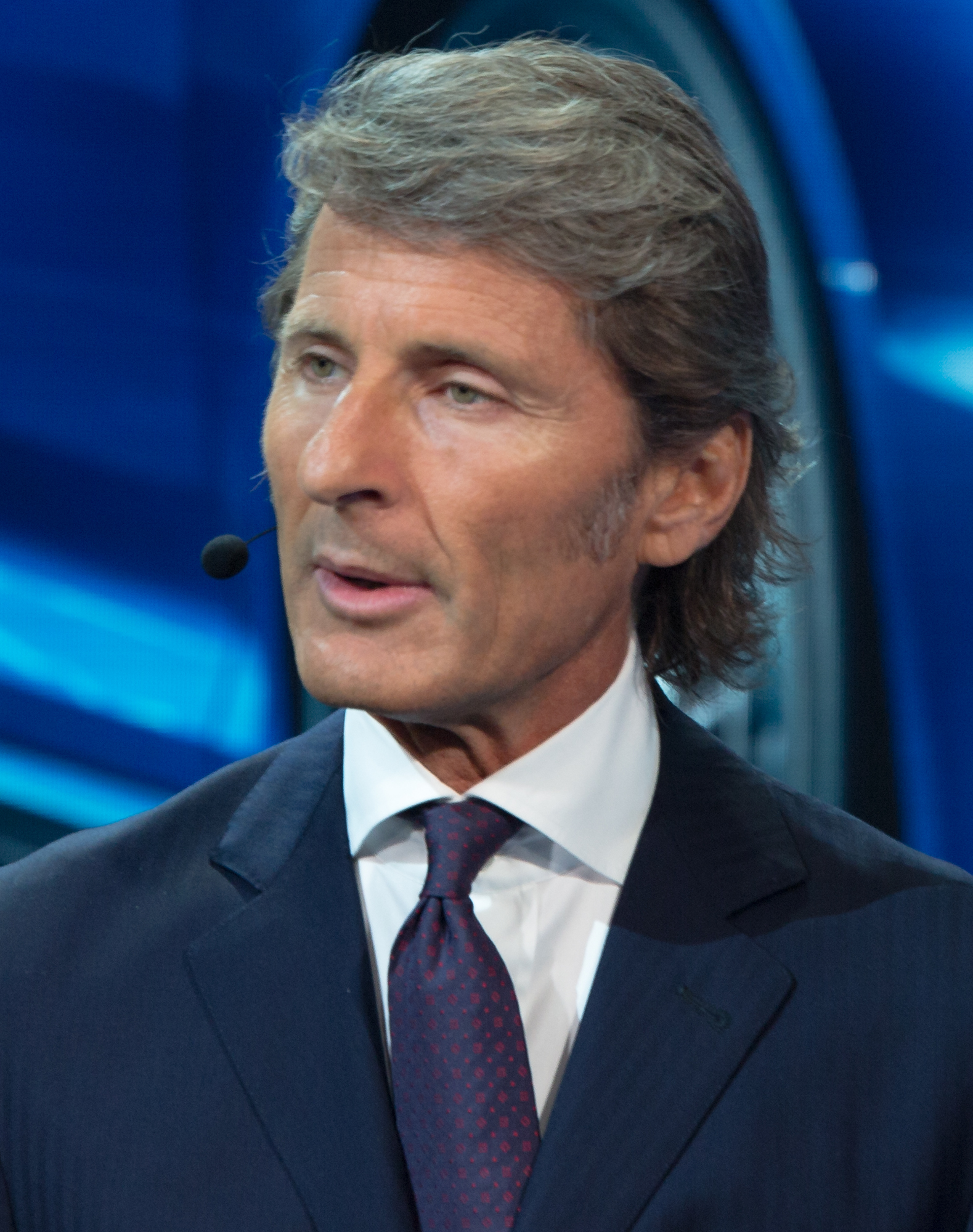
- Winkelmann in 2017
- Born: October 18, 1964 (age 61); Berlin, East Germany
- Education: LMU Munich
- Occupation: Chief Executive Officer
- Years active: 1990–present
- Employers: MLP SE; Mercedes-Benz; Fiat; Audi Sport GmbH; Bugatti Automobiles; Lamborghini
- Office: CEO Bugatti Automobiles (2018–2022); CEO Lamborghini (2020–present)
- Awards: Grand Officers of the Order of Merit of the Italian Republic; Knights Grand Cross of the Order of Merit of the Italian Republic

Stephan Winkelmann (born 18 October 1964) is a German automotive executive who has been the president and CEO of Automobili Lamborghini S.p.A. since December 2020.

== Life ==
As a young child, Winkelmann moved with his parents from Berlin to Rome, as his father worked as a diplomat at the Food and Agriculture Organization of the United Nations (FAO). Winkelmann lived there for almost 20 years and graduated from the local German school. He then began studying political science, graduating with an MA at LMU Munich in 1991. During his studies, Winkelmann served for two years in the paratroopers of the German Armed Forces in Calw, Nagold, and Altenstadt and reached the rank of lieutenant of the reserve.

== Career ==
He began his professional career in 1990 at the German financial services provider MLP.

=== Alfa Romeo & Fiat ===
Starting in 1993, Winkelmann entered the automotive industry, working first in Munich as a sales representative for Mercedes-Benz and afterwards, from 1994 to 2004, for Fiat and Alfa Romeo, Lancia, and Fiat Professional, respectively. There, Winkelmann held marketing and sales management positions, first as head of Alfa Romeo Germany, then as head of marketing for Fiat's southern region. From 1996 to 1999 for Italy, beginning with the launch of the Alfa Romeo 156. Winkelmann then worked as area manager for several European markets until he was appointed head of sales in Austria and then Fiat's managing director for Austria and Switzerland. In 2004, Winkelmann moved to Germany as CEO of Fiat Automobil AG.

=== Lamborghini ===
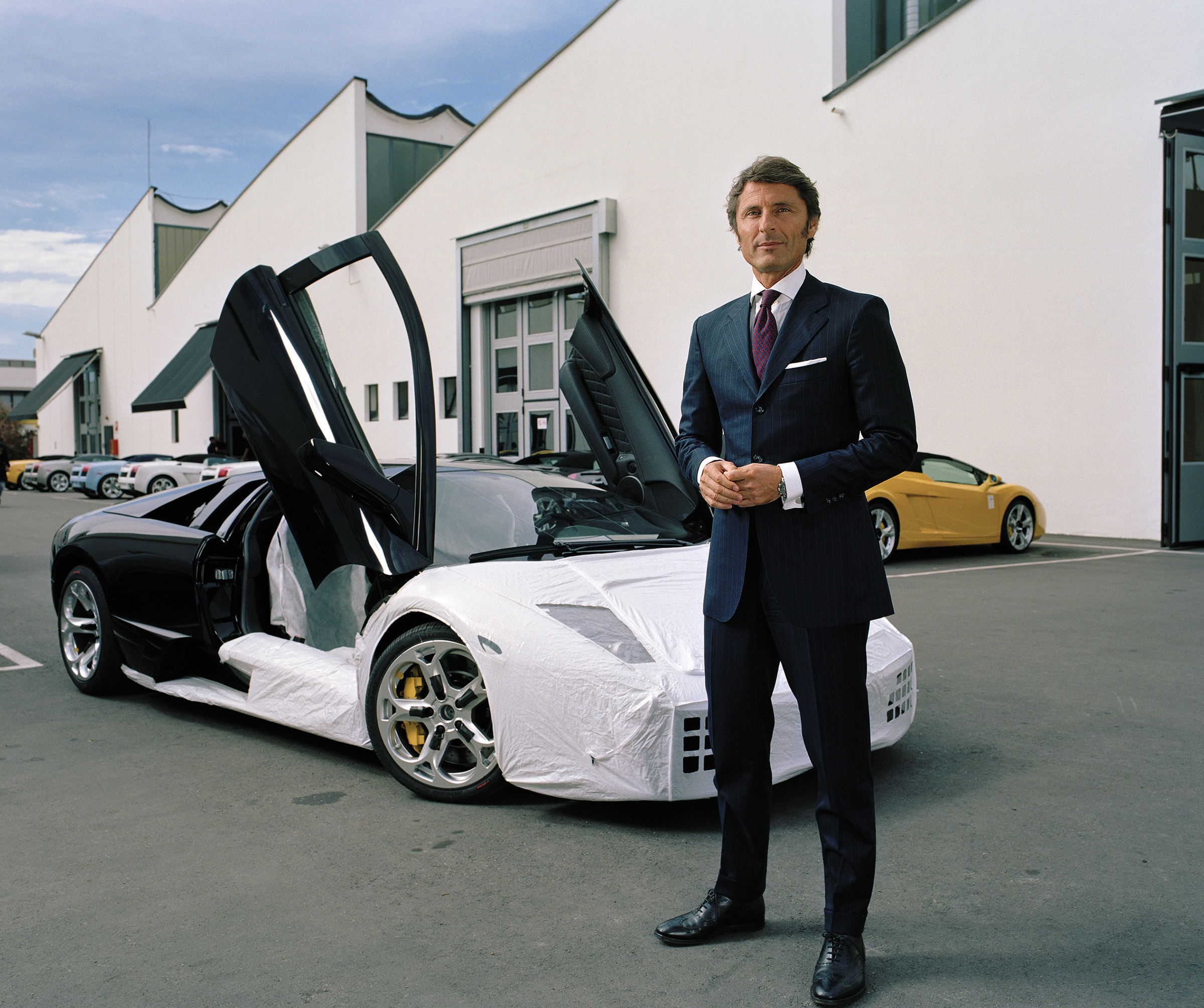
Stephan Winkelmann in front of the Lamborghini plant in Sant'Agata Bolognese, photographed by Oliver Mark in 2007

In January 2005, Stephan Winkelmann joined the Volkswagen Group and took over as President and CEO of Automobili Lamborghini in Sant'Agata Bolognese. In the period up to 2016, his responsibilities included the launch of the new Gallardo, Murciélago, Aventador, and Huracán models, plus a large number of unique models and one-offs. Under Winkelmann's aegis, Lamborghini also developed the Urus SUV, which was launched in 2018. Between 2005 and 2016, Lamborghini vehicle sales increased by 300 percent.

At the end of 2020, it was announced that Winkelmann would once again take over as head of Lamborghini from December 1, in personal union with his previous role at Bugatti. He succeeded Stefano Domenicali, who became head of Formula 1 on January 1, 2021. Winkelmann also sits on the supervisory boards at Comité Colbert, an association of French luxury manufacturers, and Altagamma, an Italian committee for luxury brands.

=== Audi Sport ===
From March 2016, Winkelmann headed quattro GmbH (now Audi Sport GmbH) as Managing Director.

=== Bugatti ===
Winkelmann has been president of Bugatti Automobiles since January 2018. He replaced the previous president, Wolfgang Dürheimer, who held the position for five years and retired at the end of 2017. Since he took office, new models such as Divo, Centodieci, La Voiture Noire, Bolide, and derivatives based on the Chiron have been created.

== Awards ==
In 2009, Winkelmann was awarded the decoration of Grand Officer in the Order of Merit of the Italian Republic.

In 2013, Winkelmann was given the ''Premio Internazionale BARSANTI e MATTEUCCI'', an automotive engineering award.

In May 2014, Winkelmann received the highest decoration in the Order of Merit of The Italian Republic, Knight Grand Cross.
