= Minardi M189 =

Formula One racing car

Minardi M189 Minardi M189B
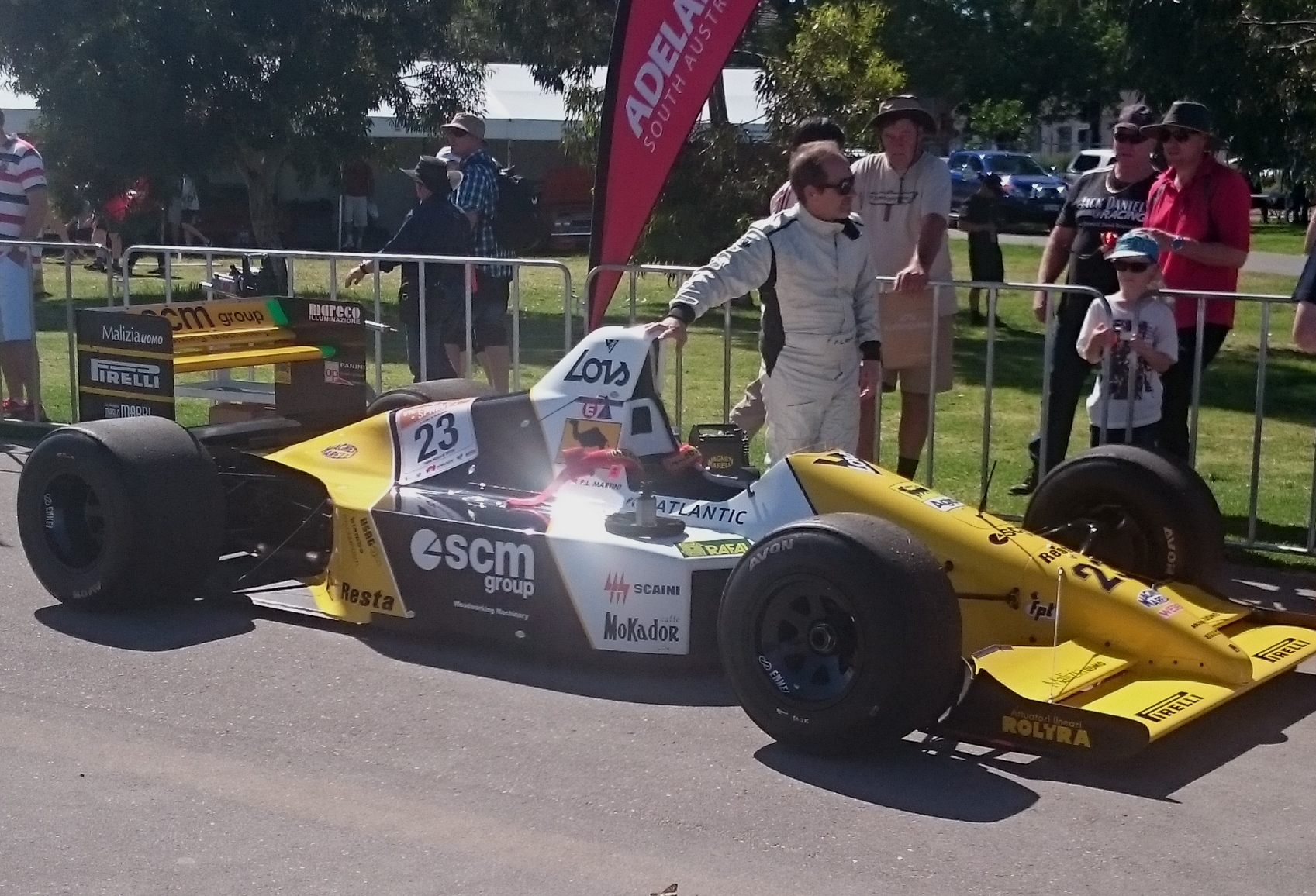
- Minardi M189 & Pierluigi Martini at the 2016 Adelaide Motorsport Festival
- Category: Formula One
- Constructor: Minardi
- Designers: Aldo Costa (Technical Director); Nigel Cowperthwaite (Chief Designer); Tomasso Carletti (Head of Design)
- Predecessor: M188B
- Successor: M190

Technical specifications
- Chassis: Carbon fibre monocoque
- Axle track: Front: 1,800 mm (71 in); Rear: 1,640 mm (65 in)
- Wheelbase: 2,927 mm (115.2 in)
- Engine: Ford Cosworth DFR 3,494 cc (213.2 cu in), 90° V8, NA, mid-engine, longitudinally mounted
- Transmission: manual
- Fuel: Agip
- Tyres: Pirelli

Competition history
- Notable entrants: Lois Minardi Team
- Notable drivers: 23. (Italy) Pierluigi Martini; 23. (Spain) Luis Perez-Sala; 24. (Italy) Paolo Barilla
- Debut: 1989 Mexican Grand Prix
Races	Wins	Poles	F/Laps
15	0	0	0
- Constructors' Championships: 0
- Drivers' Championships: 0

The Minardi M189 was a Formula One car, designed for Minardi by Nigel Cowperthwaite for use in the 1989 FIA Formula One World Championship. Introduced partway through the year and driven by Pierluigi Martini and Luis Perez-Sala, it scored several points finishes for the team. Updated as the M189B for the 1990 season, it was used for the first two races of the year before being replaced by the Minardi M190.

== Design and development ==
The Minardi M189 was designed by Nigel Cowperthwaite. Running on Pirelli tyres, it was powered by a Ford Cosworth DFR V8, the upgrade of engine that had been used the previous season in the Minardi M188.

== Racing history ==
The Minardi M189 made its first appearance partway through the 1989 Formula One season at the Mexican Grand Prix, where it was driven by Pierluigi Martini and Luis Perez-Sala, both of whom had driven for the team the previous year. Martini qualified in 22nd but retired from the race with engine problems. Sala failed to qualify for the race, and this proved to be an ongoing problem for the Spaniard. He failed to qualify for three more races.

After making the car's debut in Mexico, Martini failed to complete the next three races but at the British Grand Prix not only finished, but scored two points for placing fifth. Sala backed this up with sixth at the same race, which was his best finish of the year. Martini finished fifth again in Portugal, where he had qualified fifth on the grid, and sixth (from third on the grid) in Australia.

Minardi finished the year with six points for 11th in the Constructor's Championship, while Martini was equal 14th, alongside Johnny Herbert, in the Driver's Championship with five points.

When the 1990 season began, Minardi's new car was still being completed so the M189 was updated to an M189B spec and pressed into service for the first two races of the year. Martini qualified on the front row for the United States Grand Prix but went on to finish seventh. He placed ninth in the following race in Brazil, the car's last grand prix before the Minardi M190 was introduced at San Marino.

== Livery ==
The M189 had a white diagonal stripe added to its traditional black and yellow livery. Spanish brand Lois was the primary sponsor.

== Complete Formula One World Championship results ==
(key)

Year	Team	Chassis	Engine	Tyres	Drivers	1	2	3	4	5	6	7	8	9	10	11	12	13	14	15	16	Points	WCC
1989	Minardi Team SpA	Minardi M189	Ford DFZ V8	P		BRA	SMR	MON	MEX	USA	CAN	FRA	GBR	GER	HUN	BEL	ITA	POR	ESP	JPN	AUS	6	11th
1989	Minardi Team SpA	Minardi M189	Ford DFZ V8	P	(Italy) Pierluigi Martini				Ret	Ret	Ret	Ret	5	9	Ret	9	7	5	Ret		6	6	11th
1989	Minardi Team SpA	Minardi M189	Ford DFZ V8	P	(Italy) Paolo Barilla															Ret		6	11th
1989	Minardi Team SpA	Minardi M189	Ford DFZ V8	P	(Spain) Luis Perez-Sala				DNQ	Ret	Ret	DNQ	6	DNQ	Ret	15	8	12	Ret	Ret	DNQ	6	11th
1990	SCM Minardi Team	Minardi M189B	Ford DFZ V8	P		USA	BRA	SMR	MON	CAN	MEX	FRA	GBR	GER	HUN	BEL	ITA	POR	ESP	JPN	AUS	0	NC
1990	SCM Minardi Team	Minardi M189B	Ford DFZ V8	P	(Italy) Pierluigi Martini	7	9															0	NC
1990	SCM Minardi Team	Minardi M189B	Ford DFZ V8	P	(Italy) Paolo Barilla	Ret	Ret															0	NC
