= Minardi M188 =

Formula One racing car

Minardi M188 Minardi M188B
- Category: Formula One
- Constructor: Minardi
- Designers: Giacomo Caliri (Technical Director); Aldo Costa (Chief Designer)
- Predecessor: M187
- Successor: M189

Technical specifications
- Chassis: Carbon fibre monocoque
- Suspension (front): Double wishbones, pullrods
- Suspension (rear): Double wishbones, pullrods
- Axle track: Front: 1,812 mm (71.3 in); Rear: 1,661 mm (65.4 in)
- Wheelbase: 2,690 mm (105.9 in)
- Engine: Ford Cosworth DFZ 3,494 cc (213.2 cu in), 90° V8, NA, mid-engine, longitudinally mounted
- Transmission: Minardi 5-speed manual
- Weight: 506 kg (1,115.5 lb)
- Fuel: Agip
- Tyres: Goodyear

Competition history
- Notable entrants: Lois Minardi Team
- Notable drivers: 23. (Spain) Adrian Campos; 23. (Italy) Pierluigi Martini; 24. (Spain) Luis Pérez-Sala
- Debut: 1988 Brazilian Grand Prix
Races	Wins	Poles	F/Laps
19	0	0	0
- Constructors' Championships: 0
- Drivers' Championships: 0
- Unless otherwise stated, all data refer to Formula One World Championship Grands Prix only.

The Minardi M188 was a Formula One car designed by Giacomo Caliri and Aldo Costa for use by the Minardi team in the 1988 Formula One World Championship and, when updated as the M188B, in the first three races of the 1989 Championship. The car was driven by Spaniards Adrián Campos and Luis Pérez-Sala, and Italian Pierluigi Martini.

== Overview ==
In 1988, ahead of the ban in turbo engines for the 1989 season, Minardi changed their engine from the Motori Moderni V6 turbo to the normally aspirated Cosworth DFZ. In early 1989, the team briefly tested the Carlo Chiti-designed boxer 12-cylinder Subaru 1235 engine in a modified M188 but it was rejected due to low power and excessive weight.

Driver Adrian Campos was dismissed after the fifth round of the season due to poor performance and he was replaced by Pierluigi Martini, who previously raced for the team in 1985 and then moved down to International Formula 3000 in 1986. Martini scored the one and only point for Minardi in his first race in Detroit, taking 6th place. The team finished 10th in the constructor's championship.

An upgraded version of the car, dubbed the M188B was used for the first three races of the 1989 season.

== Livery ==
The M188 retained its black and yellow colour scheme from previous years. Spanish jeans company Lois was the title sponsor for the year.

== Complete Formula One World Championship results ==
(key)

Year	Team	Chassis	Engine	Tyres	Drivers	1	2	3	4	5	6	7	8	9	10	11	12	13	14	15	16	Points	WCC
1988	Lois Minardi Team SpA	Minardi M188	Ford DFZ 3.5 V8	G		BRA	SMR	MON	MEX	CAN	DET	FRA	GBR	GER	HUN	BEL	ITA	POR	ESP	JPN	AUS	1	10th
1988	Lois Minardi Team SpA	Minardi M188	Ford DFZ 3.5 V8	G	(Spain) Adrián Campos	Ret	16	DNQ	DNQ	DNQ												1	10th
1988	Lois Minardi Team SpA	Minardi M188	Ford DFZ 3.5 V8	G	(Italy) Pierluigi Martini						6	15	15	DNQ	Ret	DNQ	Ret	Ret	Ret	13	7	1	10th
1988	Lois Minardi Team SpA	Minardi M188	Ford DFZ 3.5 V8	G	(Spain) Luis Pérez-Sala	Ret	11	Ret	11	13	Ret	NC	Ret	DNQ	10	DNQ	Ret	8	12	15	Ret	1	10th
1989	Minardi Team SpA	Minardi M188B	Ford DFZ 3.5 V8	P		BRA	SMR	MON	MEX	USA	CAN	FRA	GBR	GER	HUN	BEL	ITA	POR	ESP	JPN	AUS	6*	11th
1989	Minardi Team SpA	Minardi M188B	Ford DFZ 3.5 V8	P	(Italy) Pierluigi Martini	Ret	Ret	Ret														6*	11th
1989	Minardi Team SpA	Minardi M188B	Ford DFZ 3.5 V8	P	(Spain) Luis Perez-Sala	Ret	Ret	Ret														6*	11th

* All points scored using the Minardi M189
