= Ferrari 640 =

1989 Formula One racing car by Ferrari

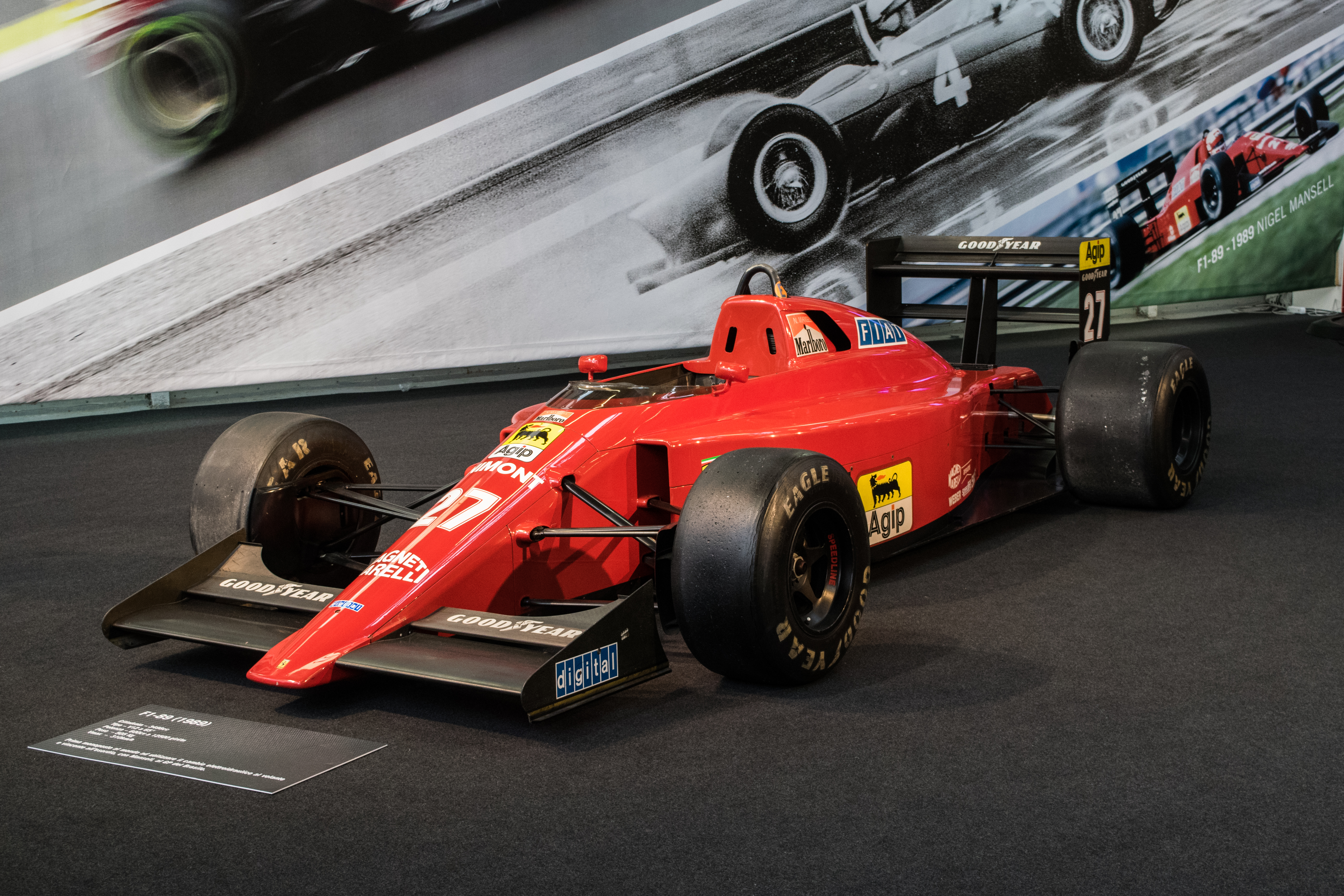
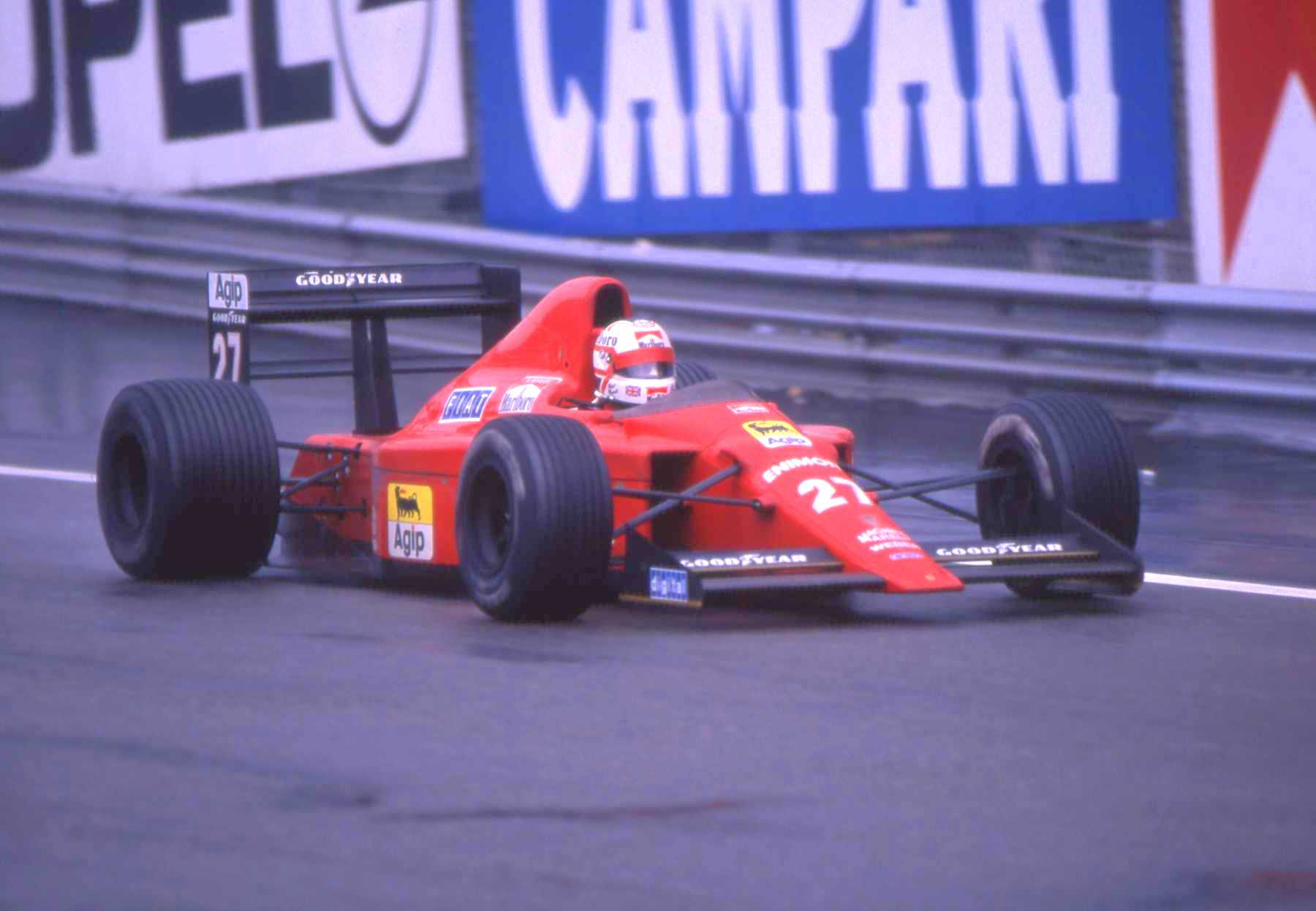
- The 639 prototype The final version with a roll hoop inlet
- Category: Formula One
- Constructor: Ferrari
- Designers: John Barnard (Technical Director); Pierguido Castelli (Technical Coordination Director); Enrique Scalabroni (Chief Designer); Henri Durand (Head of Aerodynamics); Jean-Jacques His (Chief Engine Designer)
- Predecessor: F1/87/88C
- Successor: 641

Technical specifications
- Chassis: Kevlar and Carbon fibre monocoque
- Suspension (front): Double wishbones, push-rod actuated torsion bar springs, and telescopic shock absorbers, anti-roll bar
- Suspension (rear): Double wishbones, pushrod actuated coil springs over telescopic shock absorbers, anti-roll bar
- Axle track: Front: 1,800 mm (71 in); Rear: 1,675 mm (65.9 in)
- Wheelbase: 2,830 mm (111 in)
- Engine: Ferrari Tipo 035/5, 3,498 cc (213.5 cu in), 65° V12, NA, mid-engine, longitudinally-mounted
- Transmission: Ferrari 7-speed semi-automatic
- Power: 660 hp @ 13,000 rpm
- Weight: 510 kg (1,120 lb)
- Fuel: Agip
- Tyres: Goodyear

Competition history
- Notable entrants: Scuderia Ferrari SpA
- Notable drivers: 27. (United Kingdom) Nigel Mansell; 28. (Austria) Gerhard Berger
- Debut: 1989 Brazilian Grand Prix
Races	Wins	Podiums	Poles	F/Laps
16	3	9	0	4

The Ferrari 640 (also known as the Ferrari F1-89) was the Formula One racing car with which the Ferrari team competed in the 1989 Formula One World Championship. It was driven by Britain's Nigel Mansell, in his first season with the team, and Austria's Gerhard Berger, winning three races between them. A prototype version known as the 639 shares some features of the early version of the 640. This prototype was tested in 1988 prior to the introduction of the early version of the 640 in 1989. Both the early and late versions of the 640 were entered with the competition title F1-89. The 639 did not receive a competition title due to its status as a prototype model.

This was the first Ferrari Formula One car powered by a V12 engine since the 312 F1-69 in 1969.

== Design ==
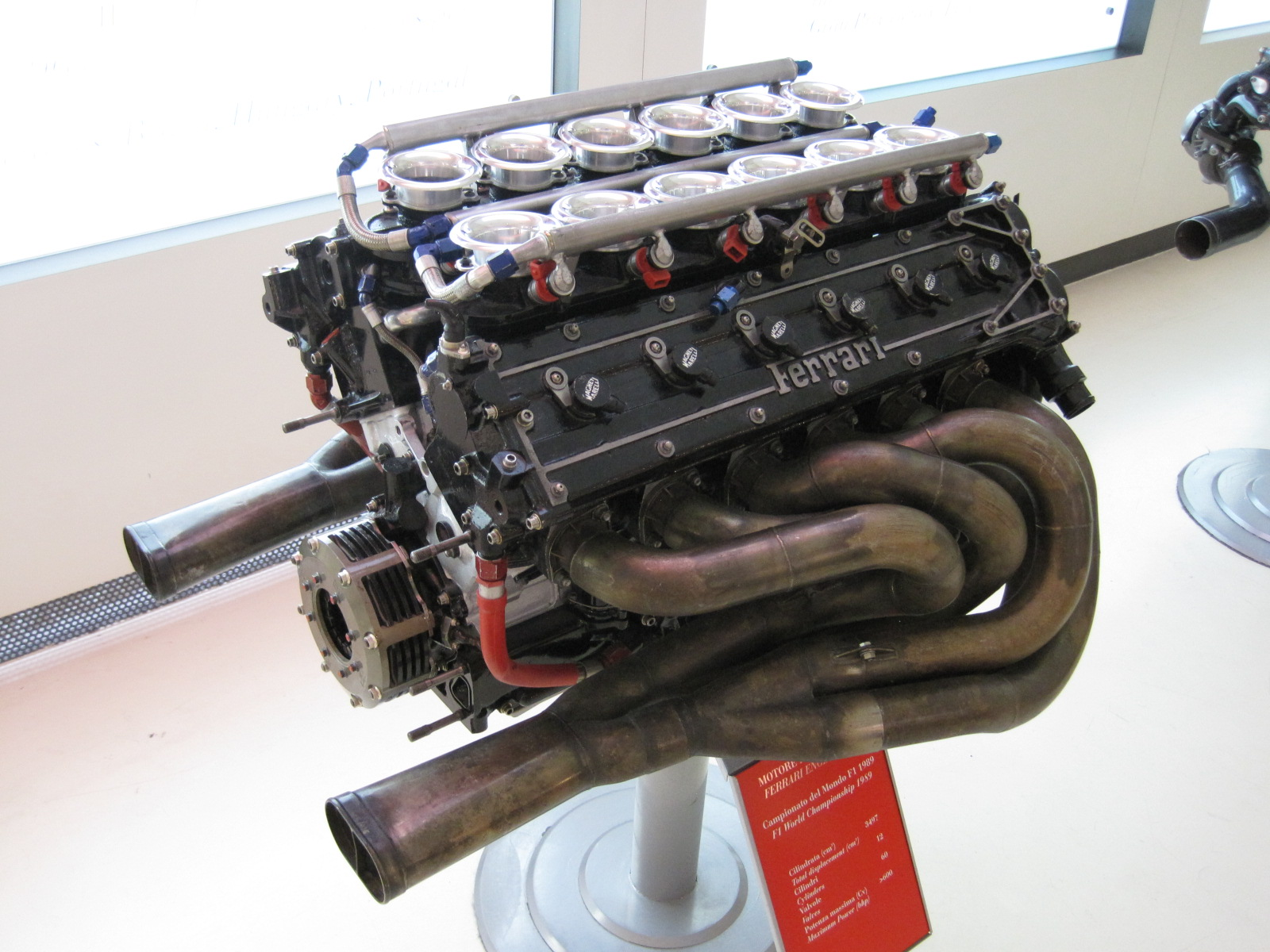
Ferrari 035/5 V12 engine used in the 1989 640.

The car was designed by John Barnard, and it was the first Ferrari he was responsible for designing. It sported a sharp nose, with a narrow monocoque and bulging side-pods designed to house the radiators with maximum aerodynamic efficiency. It originally had two small air intakes on either side of the driver, but from the fourth race of the season in Mexico a more conventional large air intake above and behind the driver was introduced, which Ferrari kept on the car for the remainder of the season.

Barnard, who had joined Ferrari from McLaren at the end of the 1986 season, had begun designing the car in 1987 with the intent of it being used during the 1988 season. However, continual problems with the car's revolutionary electrohydraulic-actuated semi-automatic gearbox saw the team forced to use the turbocharged F1/87/88C in 1988, with the car's debut pushed back to 1989, the first year of FISA's 3.5-litre (210 cu in) atmospheric formula where turbos were banned. The car was a development of the unraced "639" car that the Scuderia had tested during 1988.

The 640 was powered by Ferrari's Tipo 035/5, a 3.5 liter V12 engine which produced up to 660 bhp (492 kW; 669 PS) by the season end, roughly the same amount of power as the engine it replaced, the Tipo 033A V6 turbo, though without the turbo's fuel consumption worries. This was still down compared to the V10 Honda used by the dominant McLarens which were rated at 675 bhp (503 kW; 684 PS). The transmission to which it was mated, however, attracted more attention, as it contained the very first true sequential-style paddle-shift gearbox seen in Formula 1. The new system, which used hydraulics to automate the gearchange and operation of the clutch, minimised time lost during gear shifts whilst reducing the complexity of the design and providing aerodynamic benefits by taking up less space than a traditional manual gear linkage. In the first half of the season, the experimental system proved to be very unreliable, and it hampered Ferrari's efforts. However, such gearboxes would become the norm by the mid-1990s. Much of the development work was conducted at Ferrari's private test track Fiorano by test driver Roberto Moreno during the winter season (Moreno also doubled as the lead driver of the small, cash-strapped Coloni team). By the time the Grand Prix circus returned to Europe at the end of June, the problem with the semi-automatic gearbox was found to be not enough power from the battery. With the help of electrical experts from team sponsor Magneti Marelli, the power supply to the gearbox was fixed and the 640's reliability rose accordingly.

== Race history ==
The car proved to be fast, and Mansell took it to victory in its début race in Brazil, despite fears of unreliability (the potential of the new car, with its innovative aerodynamics, gearbox, and V12 engine was clear - Mansell declared on the eve of the Brazilian race that if "the car had even half the horsepower it sounds like it has, we'll win every race this year...", while Berger declared that "The (semi-automatic transmission) system is super" despite its unreliability). However, it did not record another finish until the French Grand Prix, and there were to be no races in which both drivers finished. But when the car did finish, it did so in a position no lower than third, with Mansell taking second in both France and his home race at Silverstone, third in Germany where the long straights saw the Ferrari V12 almost breathless against the more powerful Honda V10s (though they still had the advantage over the Renault V10s of Williams and the Ford V8 powered Benettons), a second win in Hungary which was highlighted by his passing move on Senna to take the lead, and finally third at Spa, before Berger finished second at Monza, won in Portugal - a race where the Ferraris were clearly more competitive than the championship-winning McLarens - and finished second again in Spain.

The carbon fibre monocoque also proved to be very strong, allowing Berger to escape from a fiery high-speed crash at Imola with only minor burns to his hands and a couple of broken ribs. In a 2013 interview, Berger revealed the reason for the crash was the front wing had broken on the car, though as the right front wheel had risen his initial thought was rear suspension failure or a flat left rear tyre. He then revealed that even in the short time it took from the car not responding to the time it hit the wall, he also realised the car was almost full of fuel and could catch fire. From then he was briefly knocked unconscious, but was awake and aware only a minute or so later. Berger's injuries were enough to keep him out of the Monaco Grand Prix, but with the help of Niki Lauda's physiotherapist Willy Dungl and the semi-automatic gearbox's advantage of not having to take his hands off the steering wheel to change gears, the Austrian was able to return one race later in Mexico.

According to Barnard, he had been searching for a way to eliminate the old manual transmission in racing cars since he had designed the Chaparral 2K that had taken Johnny Rutherford to victory in the 1980 Indianapolis 500. This was purely from an aerodynamic perspective as the manual transmission (usually located on the drivers' right-hand side) had meant that a car's monocoque had to be wider than desirable to accommodate the stick shift and its link to the gearbox located at the rear of a car. The semi-automatic transmission with its paddle-shifters located behind the steering wheel, along with an electrohydraulically-operated clutch pedal, had eliminated the need for this and had allowed Barnard to design the Ferrari with its distinctive sharp nose.

At the end of the season, Mansell was fourth in the Drivers' Championship with 38 points, while Berger was seventh with 21. Berger, third in the 1988 Drivers' Championship, only finished 3 races during the season and retired from 10 of the first 11 races (missing Monaco). His first points came in Round 12 at Monza with a second-place before winning in Portugal and finishing 2nd again in Spain. Ferrari battled with Williams for second in the Constructors' Championship for much of the year but ultimately settled for third, with 59 points. Ferrari lost 2nd in the Constructors' Championship when both Mansell and Berger failed to finish the final two races of the year in Japan and Australia, while both Williams drivers finished second and third at Suzuka, and first and third in Adelaide.

For the 1990 season, the 640 was replaced with the 641.

== Complete Formula One results ==
(key) (results in bold indicate pole position; results in italics indicate fastest lap)

Year	Entrant	Engine	Tyres	Drivers	1	2	3	4	5	6	7	8	9	10	11	12	13	14	15	16	Pts.	WCC
1989	Scuderia Ferrari	Ferrari Tipo 035/5; 3.5L V12	**G**		BRA	SMR	MON	MEX	USA	CAN	FRA	GBR	GER	HUN	BEL	ITA	POR	ESP	JPN	AUS	**59**	**3rd**
1989	Scuderia Ferrari	Ferrari Tipo 035/5; 3.5L V12	**G**	Nigel Mansell	1	Ret	Ret	Ret	Ret	DSQ	2	2	3	1	3	Ret	DSQ		Ret	Ret	**59**	**3rd**
1989	Scuderia Ferrari	Ferrari Tipo 035/5; 3.5L V12	**G**	Gerhard Berger	Ret	Ret		Ret	Ret	Ret	Ret	Ret	Ret	Ret	Ret	2	1	2	Ret	Ret	**59**	**3rd**
