= Minardi M190 =

Formula One racing car

- Category: Formula One
- Constructor: Minardi
- Designers: Aldo Costa (Technical Director); Tomasso Carletti (Chief Designer)
- Predecessor: M189B
- Successor: M191

Technical specifications
- Chassis: Carbon fibre and Kevlar monocoque
- Axle track: Front: 1,800 mm (70.9 in); Rear: 1,640 mm (64.6 in)
- Wheelbase: 2,940 mm (115.7 in)
- Engine: Ford Cosworth DFR 3,493 cc (213.2 cu in), V8, NA, mid-engine, longitudinally mounted
- Transmission: Minardi
- Fuel: Agip
- Tyres: Pirelli

Competition history
- Notable entrants: SCM Minardi Team
- Notable drivers: 23. (Italy) Pierluigi Martini; 24. (Italy) Paolo Barilla; 24. (Italy) Gianni Morbidelli
- Debut: 1990 San Marino Grand Prix
Races	Wins	Poles	F/Laps
14	0	0	0
- Teams' Championships: 0
- Constructors' Championships: 0
- Drivers' Championships: 0

The Minardi M190 was a Formula One car designed by Aldo Costa and Tomasso Carletti and built by Minardi for the 1990 Formula One season. The car was powered by the Cosworth DFR V8 engine and ran on Pirelli tyres. It failed to score any points for Minardi.

The Minardi M190 was the last Faenza-based Formula One car to run on Pirelli tyres until Toro Rosso STR6 in 2011.

== Racing history ==
Minardi had used the M189 for the first two races of the season but without finishing in the points, before the M190 debuted in the third race of the season, the San Marino Grand Prix, driven by Italians Pierluigi Martini and Paolo Barilla. Martini failed to start the race after an accident in practice while Barilla qualified 26th on the grid. He went on to finish 11th, which would prove to be his best finish of the year.

After a series of failures to qualify for races towards the end of the season, Barilla was replaced by fellow Italian Gianni Morbidelli for the last two races of the year. Morbidelli's qualifying performances were better but he failed to finish either race he started.

The M190 did not score any points for Minardi in the Constructors' Championship. Its best result was Martini's 8th place at Japan.

== Livery ==
The M190 kept its yellow, black and white diagonal striped livery from 1989. The departure of Luis Pérez-Sala also meant Lois left as the main sponsor, after three seasons, being replaced by Italian woodwoorking company SCM Group.

== Complete Formula One results ==
(key)

Year	Chassis	Engine	Tyres	Drivers	1	2	3	4	5	6	7	8	9	10	11	12	13	14	15	16	Points	WCC
1990	M190	Ford DFR; V8	P		USA	BRA	SMR	MON	CAN	MEX	FRA	GBR	GER	HUN	BEL	ITA	POR	ESP	JPN	AUS	0	NC
1990	M190	Ford DFR; V8	P	(Italy) Pierluigi Martini			DNS	Ret	Ret	12	Ret	Ret	Ret	Ret	15	Ret	11	Ret	8	9	0	NC
1990	M190	Ford DFR; V8	P	(Italy) Paolo Barilla			11	Ret	DNQ	14	DNQ	12	DNQ	15	Ret	DNQ	DNQ	DNQ			0	NC
1990	M190	Ford DFR; V8	P	(Italy) Gianni Morbidelli															Ret	Ret	0	NC
