= 1989 Formula One World Championship =

43rd season of FIA Formula One motor racing

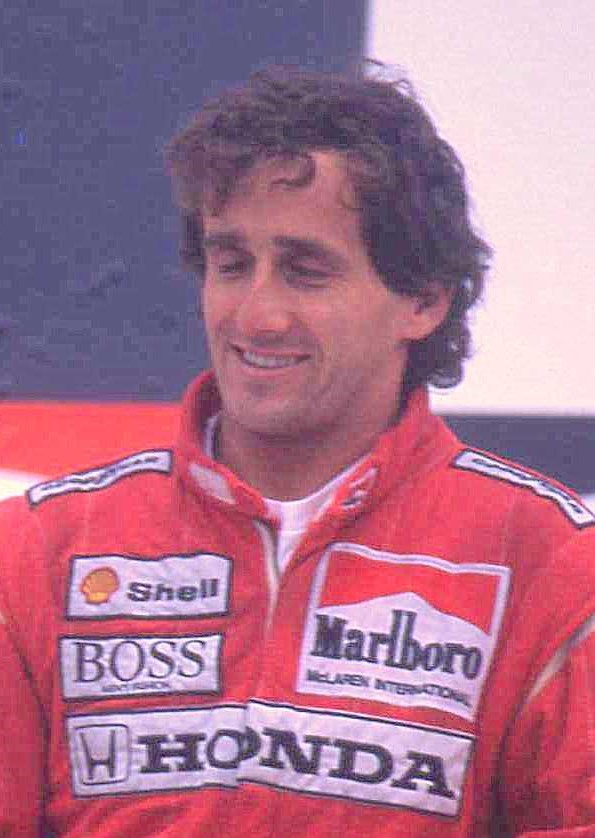
Alain Prost won the Drivers' title for the third time with McLaren, scoring 76 points in his last season with the team.

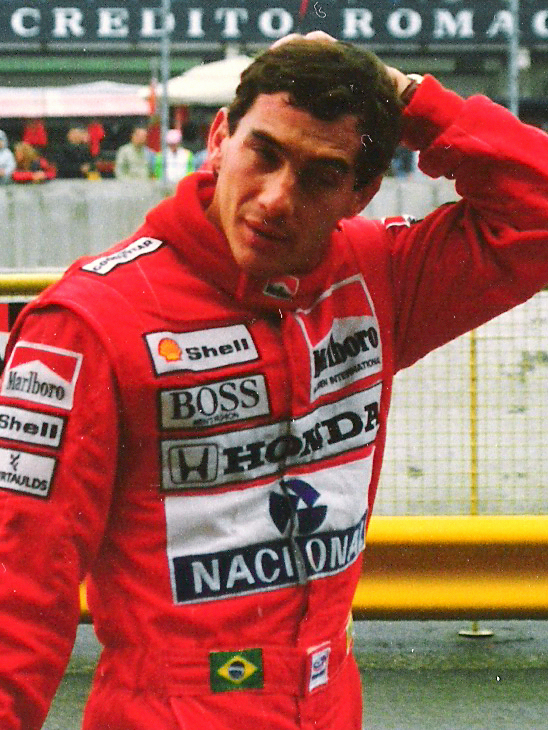
Defending champion and Prost's teammate Ayrton Senna finished runner-up, 16 points behind.

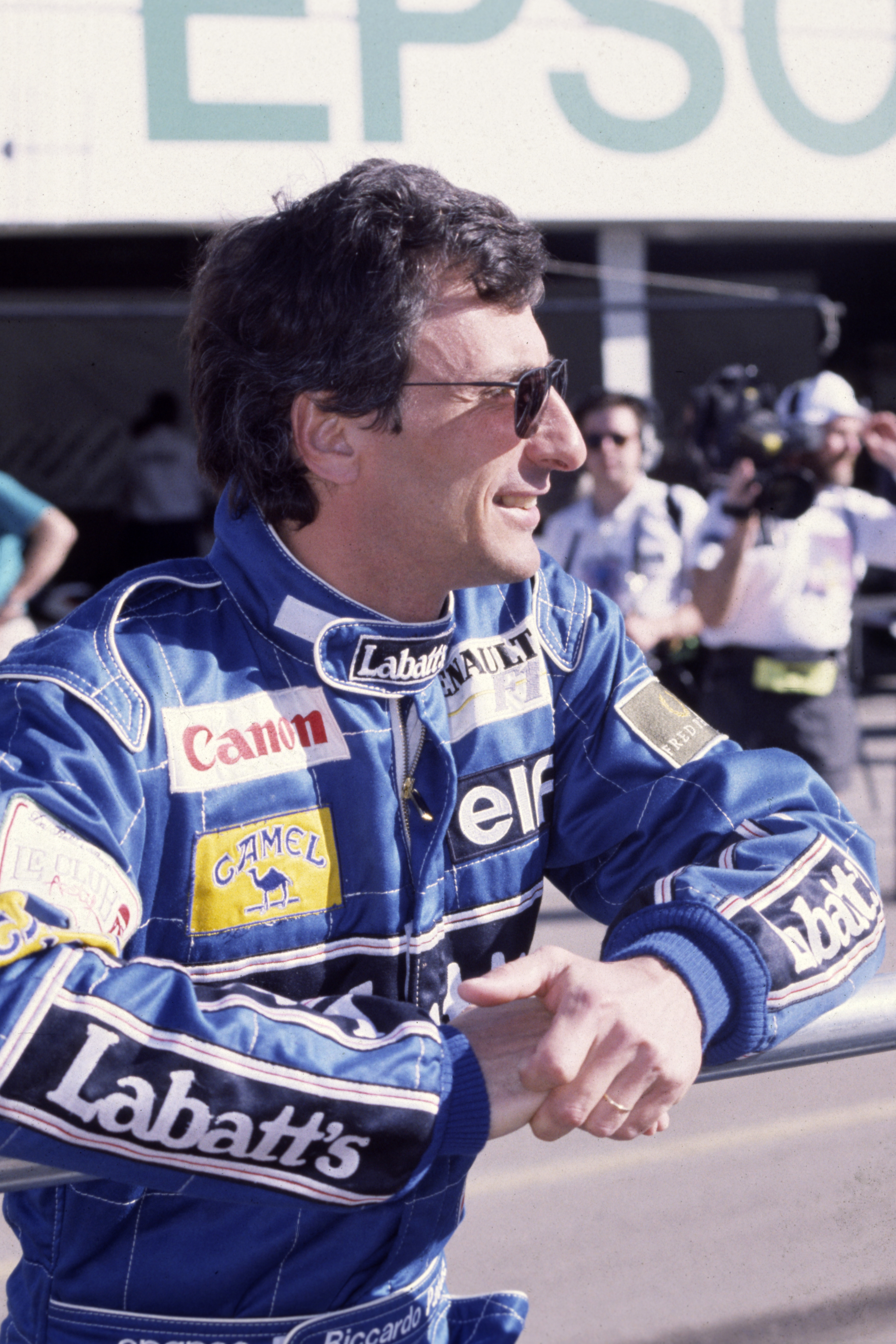
Riccardo Patrese came third on 40 points for Williams-Renault.

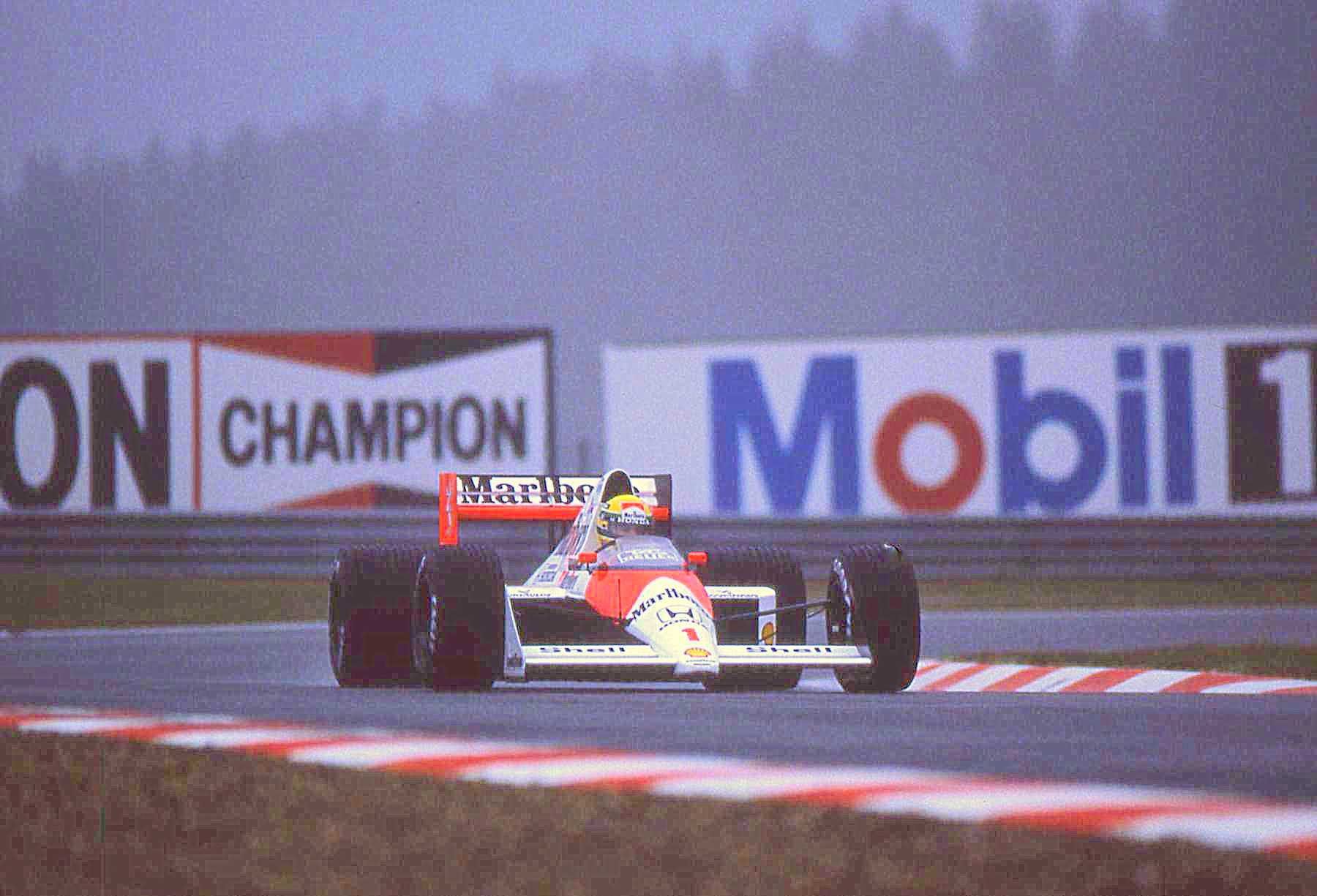
McLaren-Honda won the Constructors' Championship with the MP4/5.

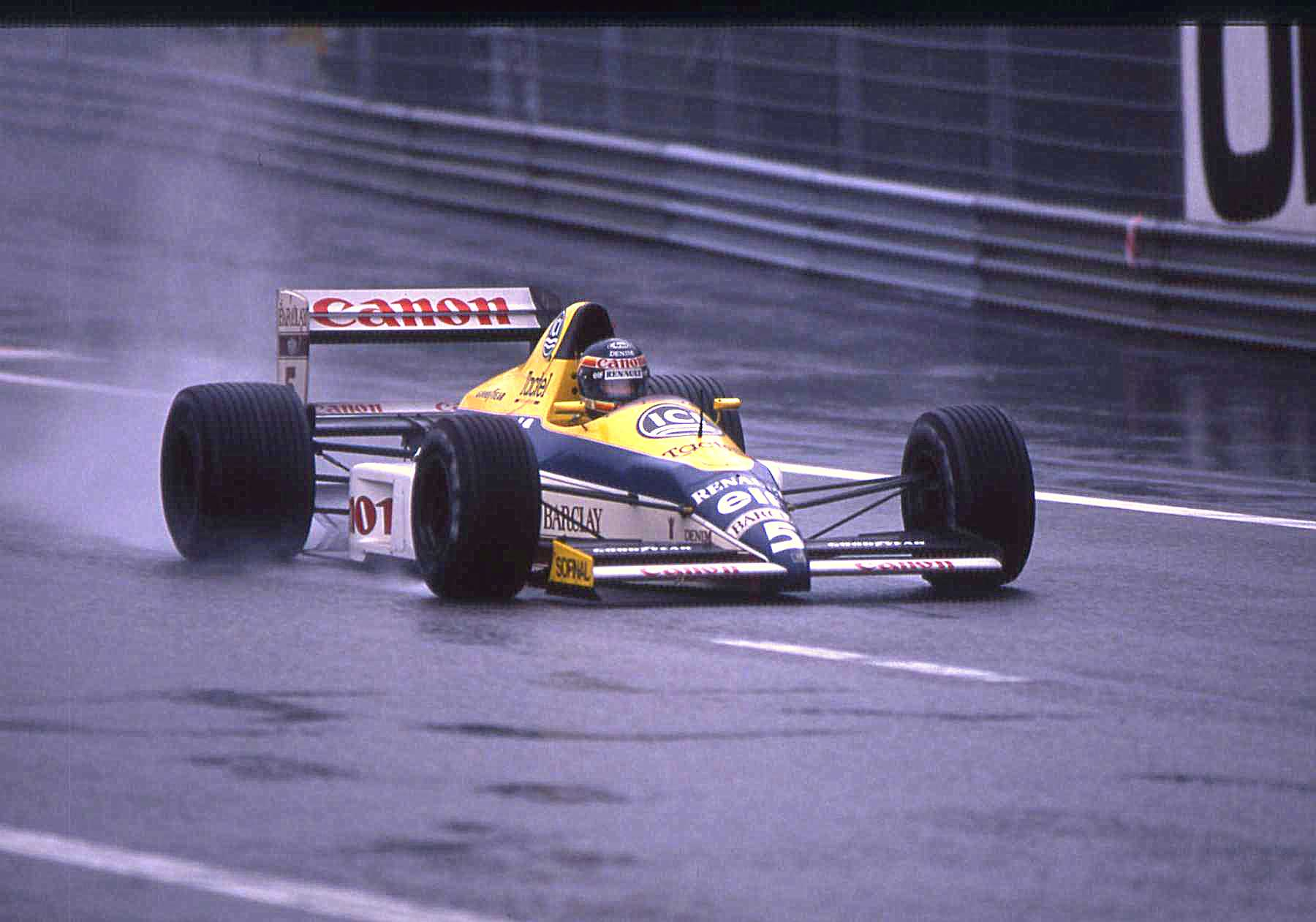
Williams placed runner-up with the Renault-powered FW12C (shown), switched mid-season to the FW13.

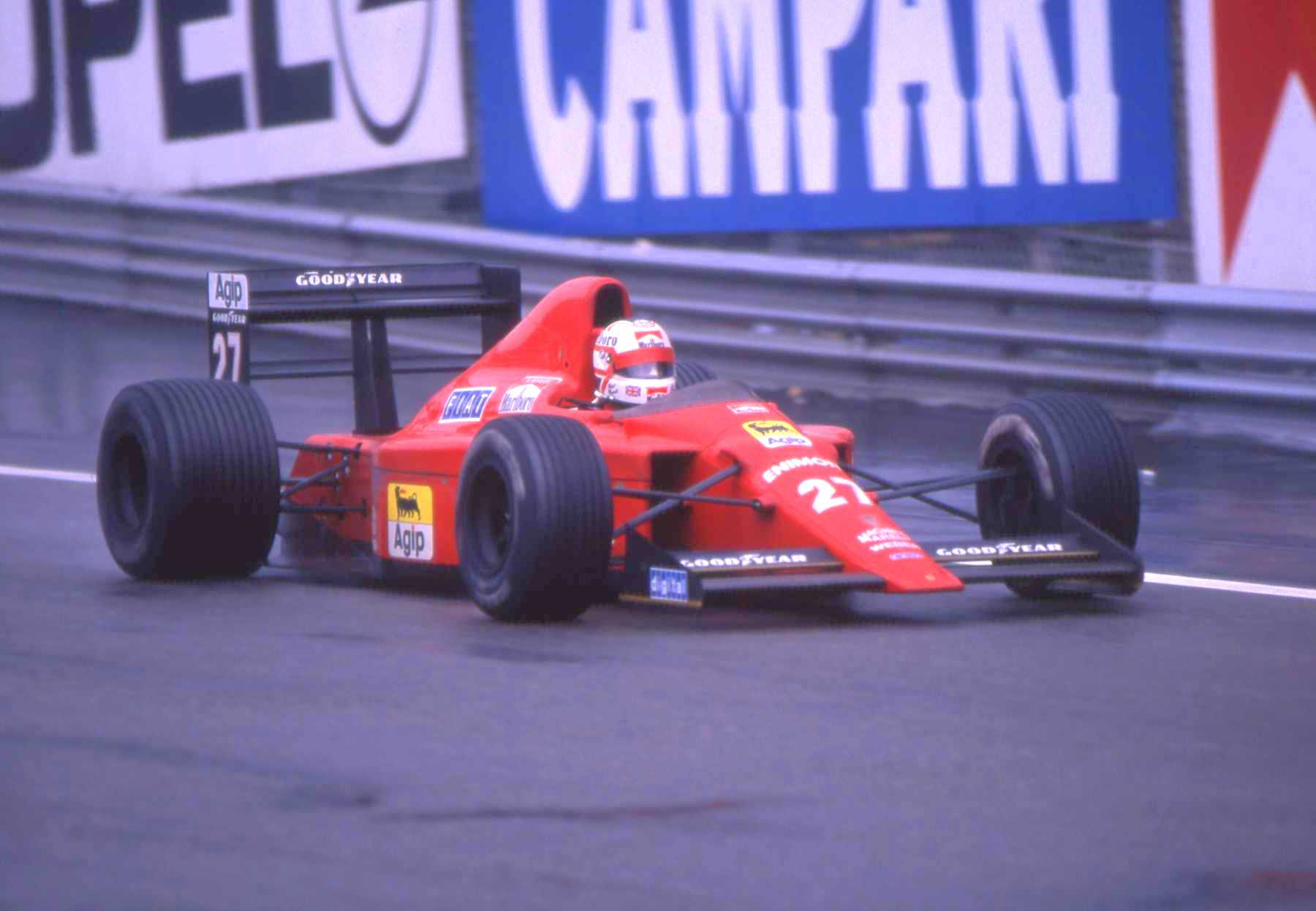
Ferrari finished third with the 640, the first F1 car using a semi-automatic transmission.

The 1989 FIA Formula One World Championship was the 43rd season of FIA Formula One motor racing. It began on 26 March and ended on 5 November. Alain Prost won his third Drivers' Championship, and McLaren won its second consecutive Constructors' Championship; its fifth overall.

The Drivers' Championship was decided in controversial circumstances at the penultimate race of the season in Japan, when Prost and teammate Ayrton Senna, who needed to win the race, collided in the closing laps. Prost retired while Senna rejoined the track after a push start and crossed the line first, only to be disqualified for not rejoining the track correctly. This handed Prost the title, his last with McLaren before joining Ferrari in 1990.

The season also saw an unprecedented number of entries, with 21 constructors originally entered, fielding a total of 40 cars. However, FIRST Racing withdrew from the championship before the opening race, leaving 20 constructors fielding a total of 39 cars, which remains the highest entry in the modern era.

This year was the first year of the new mandatory 3.5 litre engine formula following the FIA's ban on turbocharged engines following the conclusion of the previous season. Renault also returned as engine supplier for the first time since 1986 with both Renault and Honda developing engines with a V10 configuration, an engine configuration never previously used in Formula One.

As of 2025, this was the last time Honda and the same engine manufacturer won both the Formula One and MotoGP world manufacturers' titles in the same year.

== Drivers and constructors ==
The following teams and drivers competed in the 1989 FIA Formula One World Championship. FIRST Racing injected material into their chassis in order to pass a mandatory FIA pre-season crash test, however, it made its car significantly overweight and they withdrew before the opening Brazilian Grand Prix. After this, they instead focused on the Formula 3000 series. Changes to the technical regulations, including the outlawing of forced-induction engines, contributed to the bumper entry.

| Entrant | Constructor | Chassis | Engine | Tyre | No | Driver | Rounds |
|---|---|---|---|---|---|---|---|
| (United Kingdom) Honda Marlboro McLaren | McLaren-Honda | MP4/5 | Honda RA109E V10 | G | 1 | (Brazil) Ayrton Senna | All |
| (United Kingdom) Honda Marlboro McLaren | McLaren-Honda | MP4/5 | Honda RA109E V10 | G | 2 | (France) Alain Prost | All |
| (United Kingdom) Tyrrell Racing Organisation | Tyrrell-Ford | 017B; 018 | Ford Cosworth DFR V8 | G | 3 | (United Kingdom) Jonathan Palmer | All |
| (United Kingdom) Tyrrell Racing Organisation | Tyrrell-Ford | 017B; 018 | Ford Cosworth DFR V8 | G | 4 | (Italy) Michele Alboreto | 1–6 |
| (United Kingdom) Tyrrell Racing Organisation | Tyrrell-Ford | 017B; 018 | Ford Cosworth DFR V8 | G | 4 | (France) Jean Alesi | 7–10, 12, 14–16 |
| (United Kingdom) Tyrrell Racing Organisation | Tyrrell-Ford | 017B; 018 | Ford Cosworth DFR V8 | G | 4 | (United Kingdom) Johnny Herbert | 11, 13 |
| (United Kingdom) Canon Williams Team | Williams-Renault | FW12C; FW13 | Renault RS1 V10 | G | 5 | (Belgium) Thierry Boutsen | All |
| (United Kingdom) Canon Williams Team | Williams-Renault | FW12C; FW13 | Renault RS1 V10 | G | 6 | (Italy) Riccardo Patrese | All |
| (United Kingdom) Motor Racing Developments | Brabham-Judd | BT58 | Judd EV V8 | P | 7 | (United Kingdom) Martin Brundle | All |
| (United Kingdom) Motor Racing Developments | Brabham-Judd | BT58 | Judd EV V8 | P | 8 | (Italy) Stefano Modena | All |
| (United Kingdom) USF&G Arrows Ford | Arrows-Ford | A11 | Ford Cosworth DFR V8 | G | 9 | (United Kingdom) Derek Warwick | 1–6, 8–16 |
| (United Kingdom) USF&G Arrows Ford | Arrows-Ford | A11 | Ford Cosworth DFR V8 | G | 9 | (United Kingdom) Martin Donnelly | 7 |
| (United Kingdom) USF&G Arrows Ford | Arrows-Ford | A11 | Ford Cosworth DFR V8 | G | 10 | (United States) Eddie Cheever | All |
| (United Kingdom) Camel Team Lotus | Lotus-Judd | 101 | Judd CV V8 | G | 11 | (Brazil) Nelson Piquet | All |
| (United Kingdom) Camel Team Lotus | Lotus-Judd | 101 | Judd CV V8 | G | 12 | (Japan) Satoru Nakajima | All |
| (United Kingdom) Leyton House Racing Team | March-Judd | 881; CG891 | Judd CV V8; Judd EV V8 | G | 15 | (Brazil) Maurício Gugelmin | All |
| (United Kingdom) Leyton House Racing Team | March-Judd | 881; CG891 | Judd CV V8; Judd EV V8 | G | 16 | (Italy) Ivan Capelli | All |
| (Italy) Fondmetal Osella | Osella-Ford | FA1M | Ford Cosworth DFR V8 | P | 17 | (Italy) Nicola Larini | All |
| (Italy) Fondmetal Osella | Osella-Ford | FA1M | Ford Cosworth DFR V8 | P | 18 | (Italy) Piercarlo Ghinzani | All |
| (United Kingdom) Benetton Formula | Benetton-Ford | B188; B189 | Ford Cosworth DFR V8; Ford HBA1/4 V8 | G | 19 | (Italy) Alessandro Nannini | All |
| (United Kingdom) Benetton Formula | Benetton-Ford | B188; B189 | Ford Cosworth DFR V8; Ford HBA1/4 V8 | G | 20 | (United Kingdom) Johnny Herbert | 1–6 |
| (United Kingdom) Benetton Formula | Benetton-Ford | B188; B189 | Ford Cosworth DFR V8; Ford HBA1/4 V8 | G | 20 | (Italy) Emanuele Pirro | 7–16 |
| (Italy) Scuderia Italia | BMS Dallara-Ford | F189 | Ford Cosworth DFR V8 | P | 21 | (Italy) Alex Caffi | All |
| (Italy) Scuderia Italia | BMS Dallara-Ford | F189 | Ford Cosworth DFR V8 | P | 22 | (Italy) Andrea de Cesaris | All |
| (Italy) Lois Minardi Team | Minardi-Ford | M188B; M189 | Ford Cosworth DFZ V8 | P | 23 | (Italy) Pierluigi Martini | 1–14, 16 |
| (Italy) Lois Minardi Team | Minardi-Ford | M188B; M189 | Ford Cosworth DFZ V8 | P | 23 | (Italy) Paolo Barilla | 15 |
| (Italy) Lois Minardi Team | Minardi-Ford | M188B; M189 | Ford Cosworth DFZ V8 | P | 24 | (Spain) Luis Pérez-Sala | All |
| (France) Ligier Loto | Ligier-Ford | JS33 | Ford Cosworth DFR V8 | G | 25 | (France) René Arnoux | All |
| (France) Ligier Loto | Ligier-Ford | JS33 | Ford Cosworth DFR V8 | G | 26 | (France) Olivier Grouillard | All |
| (Italy) Scuderia Ferrari | Ferrari | 640 | Ferrari Tipo 035/5 V12 | G | 27 | (United Kingdom) Nigel Mansell | 1–13, 15–16 |
| (Italy) Scuderia Ferrari | Ferrari | 640 | Ferrari Tipo 035/5 V12 | G | 28 | (Austria) Gerhard Berger | 1–2, 4–16 |
| (France) Team Larrousse | Lola-Lamborghini | LC88B; LC89 | Lamborghini LE3512 V12 | G | 29 | (France) Yannick Dalmas | 1–6 |
| (France) Team Larrousse | Lola-Lamborghini | LC88B; LC89 | Lamborghini LE3512 V12 | G | 29 | (France) Éric Bernard | 7–8 |
| (France) Team Larrousse | Lola-Lamborghini | LC88B; LC89 | Lamborghini LE3512 V12 | G | 29 | (Italy) Michele Alboreto | 9–16 |
| (France) Team Larrousse | Lola-Lamborghini | LC88B; LC89 | Lamborghini LE3512 V12 | G | 30 | (France) Philippe Alliot | All |
| (Italy) Coloni | Coloni-Ford | FC188B; C3 | Ford Cosworth DFR V8 | P | 31 | (Brazil) Roberto Moreno | All |
| (Italy) Coloni | Coloni-Ford | FC188B; C3 | Ford Cosworth DFR V8 | P | 32 | (France) Pierre-Henri Raphanel | 1–10 |
| (Italy) Coloni | Coloni-Ford | FC188B; C3 | Ford Cosworth DFR V8 | P | 32 | (Italy) Enrico Bertaggia | 11–16 |
| (Italy) EuroBrun Racing | EuroBrun-Judd | ER188B; ER189 | Judd CV V8 | P | 33 | (Switzerland) Gregor Foitek | 1–11 |
| (Italy) EuroBrun Racing | EuroBrun-Judd | ER188B; ER189 | Judd CV V8 | P | 33 | (Argentina) Oscar Larrauri | 12–16 |
| (West Germany) West Zakspeed Yamaha | Zakspeed-Yamaha | 891 | Yamaha OX88 V8 | P | 34 | (West Germany) Bernd Schneider | All |
| (West Germany) West Zakspeed Yamaha | Zakspeed-Yamaha | 891 | Yamaha OX88 V8 | P | 35 | (Japan) Aguri Suzuki | All |
| (United Kingdom) Moneytron Onyx Formula One | Moneytron Onyx-Ford | ORE-1 | Ford Cosworth DFR V8 | G | 36 | (Sweden) Stefan Johansson | All |
| (United Kingdom) Moneytron Onyx Formula One | Moneytron Onyx-Ford | ORE-1 | Ford Cosworth DFR V8 | G | 37 | (Belgium) Bertrand Gachot | 1–12 |
| (United Kingdom) Moneytron Onyx Formula One | Moneytron Onyx-Ford | ORE-1 | Ford Cosworth DFR V8 | G | 37 | (Finland) JJ Lehto | 13–16 |
| (West Germany) Rial Racing | Rial-Ford | ARC2 | Ford Cosworth DFR V8 | G | 38 | (West Germany) Christian Danner | 1–13 |
| (West Germany) Rial Racing | Rial-Ford | ARC2 | Ford Cosworth DFR V8 | G | 38 | (Switzerland) Gregor Foitek | 14 |
| (West Germany) Rial Racing | Rial-Ford | ARC2 | Ford Cosworth DFR V8 | G | 38 | (France) Pierre-Henri Raphanel | 15–16 |
| (West Germany) Rial Racing | Rial-Ford | ARC2 | Ford Cosworth DFR V8 | G | 39 | (West Germany) Volker Weidler | 1–10 |
| (West Germany) Rial Racing | Rial-Ford | ARC2 | Ford Cosworth DFR V8 | G | 39 | (France) Pierre-Henri Raphanel | 11–14 |
| (West Germany) Rial Racing | Rial-Ford | ARC2 | Ford Cosworth DFR V8 | G | 39 | (Belgium) Bertrand Gachot | 15–16 |
| (France) AGS | AGS-Ford | JH23B; JH24 | Ford Cosworth DFR V8 | G | 40 | (Italy) Gabriele Tarquini | 2–16 |
| (France) AGS | AGS-Ford | JH23B; JH24 | Ford Cosworth DFR V8 | G | 41 | (West Germany) Joachim Winkelhock | 1–7 |
| (France) AGS | AGS-Ford | JH23B; JH24 | Ford Cosworth DFR V8 | G | 41 | (France) Yannick Dalmas | 8–16 |
| (Italy) FIRST Racing | FIRST-Judd | F189 | Judd CV V8 | P | 42 | (Italy) Gabriele Tarquini | None |

- ^1 Despite being on the entry list, the FIRST team did not contest any races.
- ^{†} All engines were 3.5-litre displacement configuration.

=== Team and driver changes ===
McLaren, having won fifteen of the sixteen races in 1988, kept their successful driver line-up of 1985 and 1986 World Champion Alain Prost and defending champion Ayrton Senna. They would drive the new MP4/5 powered by a Honda V10 engine.

Ferrari completed the signing of British driver Nigel Mansell, taking the place of Michele Alboreto alongside Austrian Gerhard Berger. The new 640, designed by John Barnard, featured a semi-automatic electronic gearbox, the first of its kind, as well as the team's first 12-cylinder engine since 1980.

Williams recruited Belgian driver Thierry Boutsen from Benetton as Mansell's replacement, alongside veteran Italian Riccardo Patrese. The team had also done a deal with Renault, returning to F1 after a three-year break, that would see them have exclusive use of the French company's V10 engines. For most of the season, Williams ran with the FW12C, an updated version of their 1988 car, before the new FW13 was introduced at the Portuguese Grand Prix.

Lotus kept their 1988 line-up of triple World Champion Nelson Piquet and Satoru Nakajima, but lost their Honda engines. The new Lotus 101, designed by Frank Dernie, used the Judd V8 engine instead.

Benetton retained Alessandro Nannini and signed British rookie Johnny Herbert to replace Boutsen. However, Herbert was still recovering from severe foot injuries sustained in a Formula 3000 crash at Brands Hatch, and was eventually replaced by McLaren test driver Emanuele Pirro. Benetton continued as the de facto works Ford team, but had to make do with the Cosworth DFR-powered 1988 car, the B188, until the new HB-powered B189 was introduced at the French Grand Prix.

Tyrrell retained Jonathan Palmer and took back Alboreto, who had previously driven for the team between 1981 and 1983. After a sponsorship dispute, Alboreto was replaced by French newcomer Jean Alesi, who at the same time was on his way to winning the F3000 championship.

The Brabham team returned after missing 1988, with Stefano Modena and Martin Brundle (fresh from winning the 1988 World Sports Prototype Championship) driving the Judd-powered BT58. Both drivers were forced to pre-qualify for the first half of the season.

The French Larrousse team continued running Lola chassis, but ditched the Ford Cosworth V8 engines in favour of the new Lamborghini V12, designed by Mauro Forghieri. The team started the year with their 1988 line-up of Yannick Dalmas and Philippe Alliot, but Dalmas was recovering from Legionnaires' disease and was eventually replaced by Éric Bernard, who in turn made way for Alboreto.

Zakspeed, having produced their own turbo engines since their debut in 1985, were forced to switch to an outside supplier in the form of Yamaha, the Japanese company appearing in F1 for the first time with its own V8 engine. Their new car, the 891, was designed by Gustav Brunner. West German Bernd Schneider, in his second year with the team, and Japan's Aguri Suzuki were both forced to pre-qualify throughout the season .

Osella were one of several teams to expand from one car to two, with Nicola Larini being joined by veteran Piercarlo Ghinzani, returning for a third stint with the team. The all-new FA1M was powered by the Ford Cosworth DFR.

Ligier retained French veteran René Arnoux and signed newcomer Olivier Grouillard, who replaced experienced Swede Stefan Johansson. The team also switched from Judd engines to the Ford Cosworth DFR, powering the new JS33.

AGS had retained Philippe Streiff for 1989, but the Frenchman crashed heavily at Rio while testing prior to the Brazilian Grand Prix, suffering spinal injuries which left him as a quadriplegic and ended his racing career. His place was taken by Gabriele Tarquini, who had planned to drive for the Italian FIRST team that year before they pulled out. AGS also expanded to two cars, the second originally being driven by Joachim Winkelhock, younger brother of the late Manfred Winkelhock.

After FIRST Racing withdrew from the championship, the only entirely new team for 1989 was Onyx Grand Prix, who had previously enjoyed success as the semi-works March team in Formula Two and Formula 3000. The Onyx ORE-1, designed by Alan Jenkins and powered by the Ford Cosworth DFR, was driven by Johansson and Belgian rookie Bertrand Gachot, who would eventually be replaced by Finnish newcomer JJ Lehto.

== Regulation changes ==
=== Technical regulations ===
- In order to combat rising costs, turbocharged engines were banned at the end of 1988, as the governing body felt them to be making the sport dangerous and expensive. However, turbocharged engines returned from the 2014 season onwards.
- The engine displacement was mandated at 3.5 litres (210 cubic inches).
- In the interest of safety, the driver's feet must be situated behind the front axle-line. This rule had been introduced in 1988 and was mandatory for all new chassis, but any that were a carry-over from 1987 were not obliged to comply with the rule which was only made compulsory for all cars from 1989. Due to the loss of the powerful turbo engines, designers were locked in a race to make the cars as aerodynamic as possible, as such designers were introducing cockpits and front ends that were smaller and far more cramped than ever, at the expense of driver comfort. The problem was first highlighted at the opening round in Brazil, with focus on the Ross Brawn-designed Arrows cars. Both drivers, Derek Warwick and Eddie Cheever, suffered severe cramping and felt that the new regulations were in fact making it more dangerous, Cheever saying that "if (he) got sideways ... (he) simply cannot correct with the steering wheel" due to his lanky frame.

=== Sporting and event regulations ===
- Race distances were standardised at 305 km (190 mi) in order to keep the races within the two-hour time limit. At slower street circuits like Monaco, the set distance could be lower. In 1989, the race distances varied from 292 km (181 mi) to 311 km (193 mi), with the aforementioned exceptions.
- The arrival of the Onyx team, the return of Brabham, and the expansion of other teams from one car to two meant that there were now 39 drivers competing for 26 places on the starting grid. So pre-qualifying was retained from 1988 and expanded to 13 cars. The four fastest cars would be allowed into the main qualifying session, from which the 26 fastest cars would be allowed to race.
- Trackside barriers had to have a minimum height of 1 m (3.3 ft), with the wall separating the pit lane from the start/finish straight at 1.35 m (4.4 ft) minimum.

== Calendar ==
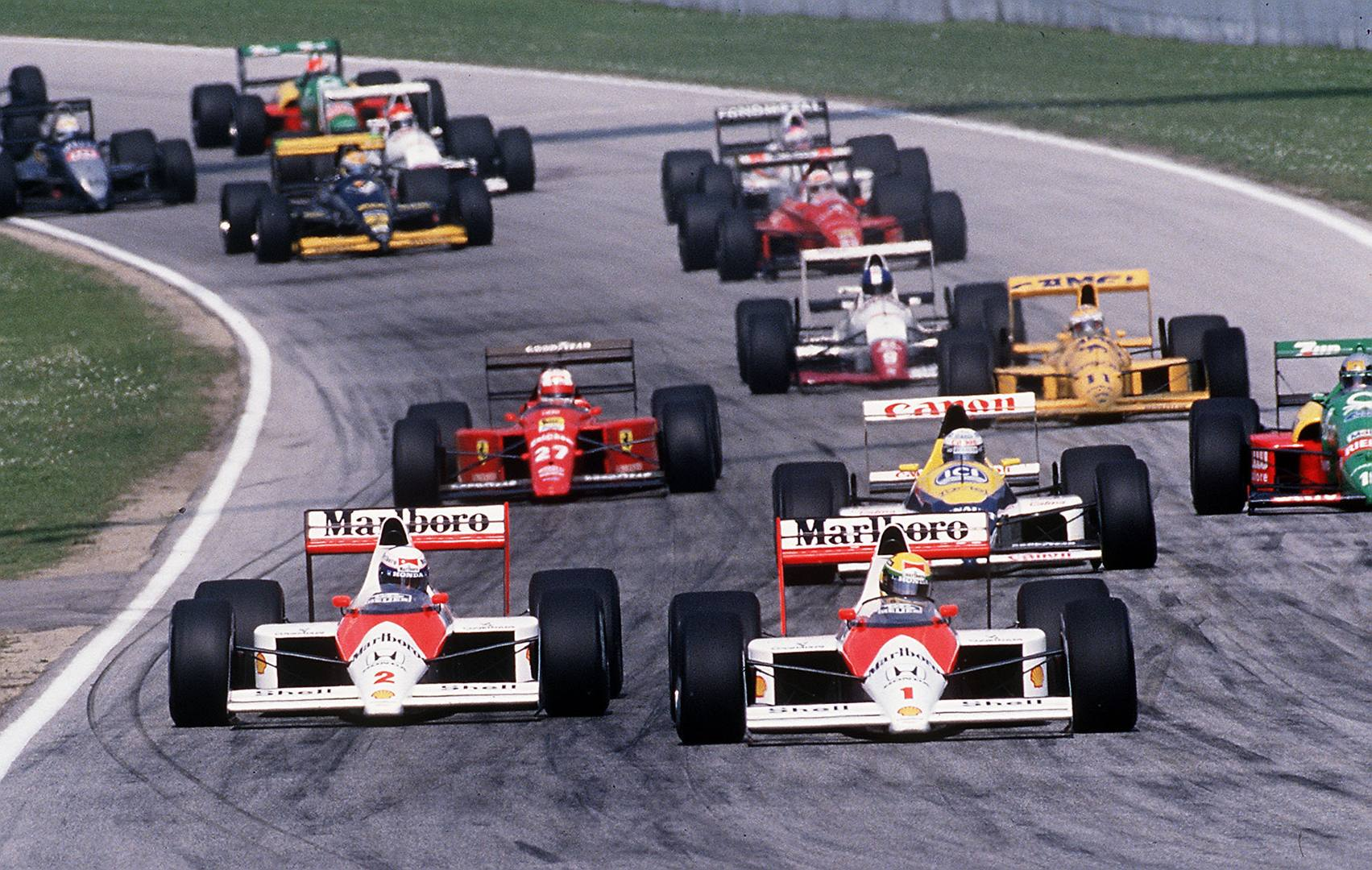
McLaren-Honda won the Constructors' Championship in 1989 with the MP4/5 (the white-and-red cars nearest the camera).

| Round | Grand Prix | Circuit | Date |
|---|---|---|---|
| 1 | Brazilian Grand Prix | (Brazil) Autódromo Internacional Nelson Piquet, Jacarepaguá | 26 March |
| 2 | San Marino Grand Prix | (Italy) Autodromo Enzo e Dino Ferrari, Imola | 23 April |
| 3 | Monaco Grand Prix | Circuit de Monaco, Monte Carlo | 7 May |
| 4 | Mexican Grand Prix | Autódromo Hermanos Rodríguez, Mexico City | 28 May |
| 5 | United States Grand Prix | (United States) Phoenix Street Circuit, Phoenix, Arizona | 4 June |
| 6 | Canadian Grand Prix | (Canada) Circuit Gilles Villeneuve, Montreal | 18 June |
| 7 | French Grand Prix | (France) Circuit Paul Ricard, Le Castellet | 9 July |
| 8 | British Grand Prix | (United Kingdom) Silverstone Circuit, Silverstone | 16 July |
| 9 | German Grand Prix | (West Germany) Hockenheimring, Hockenheim | 30 July |
| 10 | Hungarian Grand Prix | (Hungary) Hungaroring, Mogyoród | 13 August |
| 11 | Belgian Grand Prix | (Belgium) Circuit de Spa-Francorchamps, Stavelot | 27 August |
| 12 | Italian Grand Prix | (Italy) Autodromo Nazionale di Monza, Monza | 10 September |
| 13 | Portuguese Grand Prix | (Portugal) Autódromo do Estoril, Estoril | 24 September |
| 14 | Spanish Grand Prix | (Spain) Circuito de Jerez, Jerez de la Frontera | 1 October |
| 15 | Japanese Grand Prix | (Japan) Suzuka International Racing Course, Suzuka | 22 October |
| 16 | Australian Grand Prix | (Australia) Adelaide Street Circuit, Adelaide | 5 November |

=== Calendar changes ===
The US Grand Prix is hosted in Phoenix replacing Detroit.

== Season report ==
=== Pre-season testing ===
As was the tradition in Formula One in the 1980s, pre-season testing took place at the Jacarepaguá Autodrome in the city of Rio de Janeiro, Brazil. Teams would travel there for 10 days in March to test and acclimatise to Rio's very hot and humid weather. The 1989 testing sessions saw several major accidents. Thierry Boutsen crashed heavily in his Williams, and later, Frenchman Philippe Streiff crashed violently at the third corner, a fast, flat out left hander called Suspiro. The AGS-Ford he was driving broke its rear suspension and he went head-on into the barriers. The impact broke the car's roll-over bar, and Streiff suffered severe back injuries and was left in a coma. He survived but was permanently paralyzed from the neck down.

=== Race 1: Brazil ===
Formula One arrived at Jacarepaguá as V10 and V12 engines were introduced. The race in Brazil included a qualifying session where Riccardo Patrese started on the front row alongside Ayrton Senna. Thierry Boutsen qualified fourth, while Gerhard Berger and Alain Prost qualified in the following positions.

The race started with a bang, as Senna's hopes at a home Grand Prix victory were dashed after a clash with Berger in the first turn. In what would prove to be a regular occurrence during the season, the semi-automatic transmission in the Ferrari 640 allowed Berger to get a lightning start from 3rd on the grid and he attempted to go inside of Senna and Patrese into the turn. Senna was squeezed between Patrese and Berger, and lost the front wing of his car. Patrese got through unscathed and in the lead of his record-breaking 177th Grand Prix start whilst Berger was out on the spot (the first of ten straight retirements for the Austrian driver) while Senna was forced to pit for repairs and would finish the race two laps down in eleventh place.

Double world champion Alain Prost's McLaren had been having problems all weekend with the Frenchman finding the McLaren MP4/5 hard to set up, and when his two stop strategy was ruined by a clutch failure, he knew he had to continue the race having made just one of his scheduled two pit stops on the notoriously abrasive Rio circuit. He finished second. Nigel Mansell secured a surprising win for the Scuderia, with no problems despite ongoing gearbox faults all weekend and a lack of winter testing (Mansell also had the steering wheel come loose on the back straight and had to have it changed in his final stop, which luckily was scheduled for the end of that lap). The final step of the podium was taken by local Maurício Gugelmin. Grand Prix debutant Johnny Herbert, Derek Warwick and Alessandro Nannini scored the remaining points. Warwick was desperately unlucky. He lost over 20 seconds in a slow pit stop and only finished 17.8 seconds behind Mansell at the finish suggesting a win (which would have been both his and Arrows' first) or podium place had gone begging.

During the awards ceremony, Mansell cut his hand open on the trophy, ending the celebration early.

This was to be the last race at this fast, flat and abrasive Jacarepaguá circuit in Rio de Janeiro. Formula One would move to a shortened Interlagos circuit in Senna's hometown of São Paulo for the 1990 season onwards.

=== Race 2: San Marino ===
At Imola in Italy, "normal service" was resumed. McLaren settled on the front row of the grid and stayed that way for the race, with Mansell's Ferrari retiring midway with gearbox issues. Gerhard Berger, despite showing promise by setting the fastest time in the wet Friday qualifying, suffered front wing failure thanks to Berger's curb hopping style and careered off the track at Tamburello at high speed and hit the concrete retaining wall very hard and spun multiple times along the wall. This forced the race to be stopped after the fuel spilled all over Berger's car burst into flames after the car came to a standstill. Berger miraculously survived with just a broken rib, shoulder bone and burns to his back and hands, due to rescue crews removing him from the wreck in less than 60 secs. He gave a thumbs up and the race was restarted not too long after. Senna went on to win with Prost second. Patrese's engine failed and Boutsen was disqualified (but he got his 4th position back in an appeal), so the third place was taken by the Benetton Ford of Alessandro Nannini. Warwick and Tyrrell's Jonathan Palmer secured the remaining point paying positions.

After the Grand Prix, Prost seemed disgruntled and said he wished to not make a comment on the race, other than that "orders were not respected". Senna refused to comment on the matter. Before the race at Monaco, Prost said he wanted "nothing to do with (Senna)" and refused to speak with him.

=== Race 3: Monaco ===
With Berger out, there were 29 cars in qualifying instead of 30, because Ferrari did not have a replacement driver. Senna had scored his third pole of the season, with the number 2 car of Prost again alongside. March introduced their new 1989 design. Senna went on to win by almost a whole minute over Prost while Stefano Modena secured a valuable third for the underfunded Brabham team on its return to Formula One after a year out. This result effectively allowed Brabham to avoid prequalifying in the second half of the season. Modena, however, failed to score any points in any other Grand Prix in 1989. Alex Caffi finished 4th in the Dallara while Michele Alboreto secured his first points since leaving Ferrari for Tyrrell. Martin Brundle scored the remaining point by finishing 6th.

During practice Prost revealed his discontent with Senna. According to Prost the pair had an agreement that if they were leading, whoever won the start would not be challenged by the other at the first corner, an agreement he previously had with former teammates Niki Lauda and Keke Rosberg. Despite Marlboro's John Hogan supporting Prost's story by stating he was present when the agreement was made, Senna continued to deny that any such agreement existed. He also contended that the corner he passed Prost at, Tosa, was actually the third turn on the Imola circuit after Tamburello and Villeneuve.

=== Race 4: Mexico ===
At the Autódromo Hermanos Rodríguez in Mexico City, Mexico, Gerhard Berger made a return despite continued pain in his fingers. However, transmission and gearbox problems forced the Ferraris to retire from point-scoring positions for the third race straight. While they lamented their results, McLaren and Senna took a third win on the trot by a differing choice of tyres. Prost's choice, and the wrong set of tyres being given to him at a pit stop (which prompted team boss Ron Dennis to issue Prost a public apology after the race), sent him down the order to fifth. Patrese was second for Williams, while Alboreto doubled his efforts in Monaco by scoring third. Alessandro Nannini finished 4th while Gabriele Tarquini was able to bring his barely pre-qualified AGS home in sixth for a well-celebrated point.

Mexico was the first time that Prost would publicly complain that his Honda V10 did not seem to work as well as Senna's, pointing out that early in the race he was clearly faster than Senna through the Peraltada curve heading onto the long front straight, but that even with a tow from Senna he was not able to make any ground on him. Then later in the race when Senna was coming up to lap Prost (who had much fresher tyres), the Brazilian was easily able to catch and pass him on the straight despite being slower through the final turn (it was later revealed that Prost ran less wing than Senna which should have theoretically given him better straight line speed).

=== Race 5: United States ===
Senna won the start and built up a small lead over Prost. Senna suffered an electrical problem when leading the race and his engine started to misfire. He signalled Prost through to a lead he would not lose on lap 34. Williams ended up being the only team to finish with both cars as the dirty track and unforgiving concrete walls ended six races, with the heat and dust cutting out many more. One driver, Alessandro Nannini, suffered from a severely sore neck after a crash in the morning warm-up and retired from fourth place on lap 10. Mansell and Berger suffered with the Ferrari V12s cutting out from identical alternator failures and both eventually retired. Patrese's second gave him third place in the championship, while Prost took the lead. Ecstatic Phoenix native Eddie Cheever celebrated his and his team's first podium of the season at his own home Grand Prix. The Brabhams, on the other hand, continued their lacklustre return, both drivers retiring with worn-out brakes. Dallara's Alex Caffi was the victim of a bizarre crash. Holding down 5th place, he was put into the wall on lap 52 by his own teammate Andrea de Cesaris when he was trying to lap him. The notorious de Cesaris later claimed he did not even know Caffi was there trying to lap him.

The race of attrition saw Christian Danner score a surprise 4th place in his Rial, while Herbert and Boutsen rounded out the scoring zone. The race ran for the full 2 hours and was flagged after 75 of the scheduled 81 laps. Alain Prost scored his only ever win in the US, while Cheever's 3rd place was his final podium in Formula One. Before the race with the heat and practice times proving some 10–15 seconds per lap slower than predicted, a petition was circulated among the teams requesting the race be reduced to 70 laps. All team managers signed the petition with the exception of Ken Tyrrell which meant the race was not officially shortened. Ironically, this would work against his team when Jonathan Palmer lost a certain 4th place after his Tyrrell-Ford ran out of fuel on lap 69. Had the race been flagged after 70 laps, Palmer would have finished 4th having already been lapped by Prost instead of running out of fuel and being classified as 9th and last.

=== Race 6: Canada ===
The Canadian Grand Prix in Montreal was run in wet conditions and provided many retirements, but also a new winner. Senna was comfortably leading with only three laps to go when engine problems forced him to retire, handing Boutsen his first victory. Patrese came home second to make it a 1–2 finish for Williams, the first time a team other than McLaren had achieved this since Ferrari in Monza the previous year. Making up for his Phoenix indiscretion, Andrea de Cesaris picked up third for Dallara, the first ever podium finish for the small Italian team.

Triple World Champion Nelson Piquet picked up his and Lotus's first points of the year by finishing 4th, only 4.8 seconds behind de Cesaris. René Arnoux would score the final points of his career by finishing 5th for Ligier. Caffi snatched the final point by finishing 6th.

=== Race 7: France ===
In his home race at the Paul Ricard circuit near Marseille, Prost took pole and won convincingly, while fellow Frenchman Jean Alesi made his debut for the Tyrrell team, replacing Alboreto due to the team now having Camel sponsorship which conflicted with his personal Marlboro sponsorship. This proved to pay off as Alesi secured a fourth-place finish (having run second at one stage). Nigel Mansell ended Ferrari's run of retirements with a secure second while Patrese was third. Swede Stefan Johansson finished 5th, scoring the Onyx team's first points, and Olivier Grouillard took the final points paying position. Senna, meanwhile, was forced to retire straight after the restart with a differential problem.

The race had to be restarted when, on the first lap, Gugelmin caused a major first corner accident when he lost control of his March, flew into the air and landed on Mansell's rear wing. Luckily, no one was hurt and all drivers managed to take the restart. The French marshals were widely criticised for tipping the upside down March back on its wheels before Gugelmin had a chance to get out of the car.

=== Race 8: Great Britain ===
The British Grand Prix at the very fast Silverstone circuit proved much the same – McLaren front row, Senna retiring from the lead after a spin, and Prost winning. Mansell finished second in his home race to please the British fans, whose Mansellmania coupled with the tifosi made for hysteria. Nannini finished third, Piquet 4th, while both Minardis, Martini followed by Pérez-Sala, took the final 2 points positions.

At this, the halfway point of the championship, Prost's lead over Senna had increased to 20 points; Britain was the 4th consecutive race Senna had retired from- and Prost had won 3 of those 4 races. Despite much talk, he downplayed the thought of a third championship. "I don't want to start talking about the championship, getting into all that," he said, "but I'm much happier now, yes. Motivated again. I've had no engine problems since Mexico, which is nice, and also I'm pleased to see Ferrari getting more competitive: both Nigel and Gerhard can win races and that can only help me."

=== Race 9: Germany ===
At Hockenheim in Germany (another very fast circuit) however, Senna's bad luck ended after scoring a treble – pole, fastest lap and the win, but he had to fight almost all the way with Prost to do so. After both McLarens suffered bad mid-race stops for tyres, Prost emerged in the lead and looked to have the race in his grasp but lost top gear with less than two laps to go. Berger's pointless season continued with a tire puncture causing a spectacular accident and robbing him of a possible podium. Mansell picked up a third place and mused everyone's thoughts: "If any of the circuits in the world is ideal for McLaren-Honda, it's Hockenheim." Patrese, Piquet and Warwick took the remaining three points-paying positions, respectively.

=== Race 10: Hungary ===
The dirty Hungaroring near Budapest provided an almost gripless practice and qualifying, that eventually led to the first non-McLaren pole position of the year – Riccardo Patrese made a Senna-like performance with a 0.31 gap between him and Senna. Another surprise was the equally impressive Alex Caffi, who scored third with a time less than a second slower than that of Patrese – in a car that had been notoriously midfield. The Ferraris, however, suffered badly. Mansell was over two seconds off Patrese's time of an impressive 1:19.7, whilst Berger constantly complained of gear shift troubles – even asking the team to change the gearbox pre-race, which they did not.

This eventually cost him a point scoring position, as the gearbox went on to fail. Countering this was Mansell's impressive 12th-to-first race, even overtaking Senna in the area he excelled most, lapping back markers – an impressive move on a track notorious for mediocre and unpassable races. He went on to compare the race to his win at Silverstone two years earlier and dedicated it to the late Enzo Ferrari, a year after the Old Man's death. Caffi's race was the exact counterpoint of Mansell's – despite a strong start he finished a lonely seventh, earning no points. Senna finished nearly half a minute behind Mansell in second, while Prost again suffered problems and finished fourth. Patrese retired from the lead and Boutsen finished third. The final two points positions were taken by American Eddie Cheever in the Arrows, finishing 5th, followed by Piquet in 6th.

=== Race 11: Belgium ===
A wet Spa showcased Senna's wet weather skills at their best. 'Magic' (Senna's nickname during the wet) shone that day to give him another win despite engine troubles that also befell Prost with Mansell in third saying that problems like that he could certainly use – he finished less than two seconds behind Senna. Boutsen, Nannini and Warwick, in that order, took the final three points-paying positions.

=== Race 12: Italy ===
The Italian Grand Prix at the Monza Autodrome near Milan sealed the end of two things: Gerhard Berger's terrible season (he scored a second place on both the grid and in the race) and Prost's relationship with McLaren. Having become progressively distanced from the team due to his conflict with Senna, he announced his switch to Ferrari for 1990, and after inheriting the race win when Senna retired from the lead late on, he proceeded to give the trophy he had won to the tifosi. McLaren boss Ron Dennis' usual composure was shattered and he hurled his trophy at his driver's feet, storming off (Dennis was unhappy with Prost giving the trophy to the tifosi as contractually all trophies won were the property of the team). Prost later said it was an unsatisfactory win and that he did not hold out much hope for the championship despite his points lead as he felt Honda were clearly favouring Senna. Boutsen inherited third for Williams. The final points went to Patrese, who finished fourth, followed by Brit Martin Brundle for Brabham and Jean Alesi in the Tyrrell.

=== Race 13: Portugal ===
The World Championship was virtually decided in the thirteenth round at Estoril near Lisbon, as Prost finished second to Berger and Senna retired in controversial circumstances when he collided with Mansell, who had illegally reversed in the pit-lane and ignored the resultant black disqualification flags. Mansell was subsequently banned from the next race.

This was Prost's twelfth points finish of the season, which meant that he now had to drop points as only the eleven best points finishes counted, but he still led by 24 points with three races left.

Johansson finished a fine third for the struggling Onyx team (a result that meant they did not have to go through pre-qualifying in the first half of 1990), marveling at the car's performance on a low-grip track and speaking of optimism for Spain. Nannini finished in fourth, while Pierluigi Martini qualified fifth and finished in that position, also leading for one lap; the only time in the Minardi team's 21-year history that it led a Grand Prix. Tyrrell racing finished in sixth for the 2nd consecutive race, although it was Jonathan Palmer that earned the point for them in Portugal. The new Williamses, however, suffered near-simultaneous and identical motor blow-outs. Up until then they looked promising.

=== Race 14: Spain ===
Senna kept the championship alive in Spain by taking pole position and leading throughout, beating Berger by almost half a minute at the Jerez circuit near Seville. Prost drove a cautious race and finished third, dropping more points, but it meant that Senna had to win both remaining races to have any chance of beating the Frenchman to the title. Meanwhile, Alesi scored another strong fourth place for the Tyrrell team. Finishing 5th was Patrese ahead of Philippe Alliot who would score the only point of the season for the Larrousse-Lola team.

=== Race 15: Japan ===
Then the Formula One circus arrived at Suzuka, Japan near Nagoya for the now infamous penultimate round for the championship. Prost said he would not leave the door open for his teammate, who he felt had made far too many risky moves on him.

Senna took pole, but Prost beat him away from the grid and led by 1.4 seconds by the end of the first lap. By lap 15, however, Senna was all over the back of Prost's McLaren after moving through both Williams and Benettons. He whittled down Prost's 5 second lead to just under a second by lap 30, but the latter pulled a few seconds ahead by the 35th lap. By the end of lap 46, with 7 to go, the gap was just over a second. Senna, further back than he had been earlier in the race, made a move on Prost in the chicane before the start-finish straight. Prost turned in early, hitting Senna, and the two skidded into the escape road and both engines stalled. Prost jumped from his car. Senna, however, got a push from the marshals to restart his dead engine and returned to the track.

After pitting for repairs, Senna worked his way past both Williams and the Benettons to take a three-second victory. However, his altercation with Prost seven laps earlier meant he had missed the chicane and, according to FIA and FISA president Jean Marie Balestre, had not completed the lap. It is worth noting that many drivers in previous races had used the escape roads near chicanes after on-track incidents, as is customary, without receiving penalties. A penalty could have been given for restarting his stalled engine, which is technically illegal, but the stewards only considered the shortcut for the penalty. He was disqualified and Nannini revelled in his first Grand Prix victory. The new Williams FW13s of Patrese and Boutsen finished second and third, putting them five points ahead of the Ferrari team in the race for second. Piquet, Brundle and Warwick clinched the remaining point-paying positions.

McLaren went on to appeal the decision. With the matter hanging in the air, Senna went on record saying it was a plot and conspiracy against him by Balestre, who he said favoured Prost. Senna would comment again on the matter after sealing his 1991 championship, reiterating his belief that he had been unfairly treated.

=== Race 16: Australia ===
The final round at Adelaide saw the race run under heavy rain. Prost elected to withdraw at the end of the first lap in such torrentially wet conditions and would score no points. Senna, who considered quitting in protest of his disqualification in the previous race, was convinced to race by friends and team members (Ron Dennis told him: "if you stop, they've won"). Starting from pole, by lap ten he had over 30 seconds to the Williams pair and counting. Instead of relaxing, he continued to push in poor visibility. On lap 13, he ran into the rear of Brundle's Brabham and was out of the race. The two Williams Renaults scored a double podium finish with Boutsen winning and Patrese coming in third, Nannini finishing between them, despite Williams being a strong proponent of not starting in such conditions. The remaining points were scored by Satoru Nakajima in his single scoring-zone finish of the season, Emanuele Pirro (Benetton's mid-season replacement for the dismissed Herbert) in the first time since Round 1 that Benetton's points came from another driver as well as Nannini, and Martini.

The Australian Grand Prix was overshadowed by the ongoing controversy surrounding the Japanese race, but once the appeals had been considered, Prost was crowned the champion for the third time.

== Results and standings ==
=== Grands Prix ===
| Round | Grand Prix | Pole position | Fastest lap | Winning driver | Winning constructor | Report |
|---|---|---|---|---|---|---|
| 1 | (Brazil) Brazilian Grand Prix | (Brazil) Ayrton Senna | (Italy) Riccardo Patrese | (United Kingdom) Nigel Mansell | (Italy) Ferrari | Report |
| 2 | (Italy) San Marino Grand Prix | (Brazil) Ayrton Senna | (France) Alain Prost | (Brazil) Ayrton Senna | (United Kingdom) McLaren-Honda | Report |
| 3 | Monaco Grand Prix | (Brazil) Ayrton Senna | (France) Alain Prost | (Brazil) Ayrton Senna | (United Kingdom) McLaren-Honda | Report |
| 4 | (Mexico) Mexican Grand Prix | (Brazil) Ayrton Senna | (United Kingdom) Nigel Mansell | (Brazil) Ayrton Senna | (United Kingdom) McLaren-Honda | Report |
| 5 | United States Grand Prix | (Brazil) Ayrton Senna | (Brazil) Ayrton Senna | (France) Alain Prost | (United Kingdom) McLaren-Honda | Report |
| 6 | (Canada) Canadian Grand Prix | (France) Alain Prost | (United Kingdom) Jonathan Palmer | (Belgium) Thierry Boutsen | (United Kingdom) Williams-Renault | Report |
| 7 | (France) French Grand Prix | (France) Alain Prost | (Brazil) Maurício Gugelmin | (France) Alain Prost | (United Kingdom) McLaren-Honda | Report |
| 8 | (United Kingdom) British Grand Prix | (Brazil) Ayrton Senna | (United Kingdom) Nigel Mansell | (France) Alain Prost | (United Kingdom) McLaren-Honda | Report |
| 9 | (Germany) German Grand Prix | (Brazil) Ayrton Senna | (Brazil) Ayrton Senna | (Brazil) Ayrton Senna | (United Kingdom) McLaren-Honda | Report |
| 10 | (Hungary) Hungarian Grand Prix | (Italy) Riccardo Patrese | (United Kingdom) Nigel Mansell | (United Kingdom) Nigel Mansell | (Italy) Ferrari | Report |
| 11 | (Belgium) Belgian Grand Prix | (Brazil) Ayrton Senna | (France) Alain Prost | (Brazil) Ayrton Senna | (United Kingdom) McLaren-Honda | Report |
| 12 | (Italy) Italian Grand Prix | (Brazil) Ayrton Senna | (France) Alain Prost | (France) Alain Prost | (United Kingdom) McLaren-Honda | Report |
| 13 | (Portugal) Portuguese Grand Prix | (Brazil) Ayrton Senna | (Austria) Gerhard Berger | (Austria) Gerhard Berger | (Italy) Ferrari | Report |
| 14 | (Spain) Spanish Grand Prix | (Brazil) Ayrton Senna | (Brazil) Ayrton Senna | (Brazil) Ayrton Senna | (United Kingdom) McLaren-Honda | Report |
| 15 | (Japan) Japanese Grand Prix | (Brazil) Ayrton Senna | (France) Alain Prost | (Italy) Alessandro Nannini (Note: Ayrton Senna originally won the race, but was later disqualified for rejoining the track illegally following his collision with Alain Prost. Alessandro Nannini, initially classified second, inherited the win.) | (United Kingdom) Benetton-Ford | Report |
| 16 | (Australia) Australian Grand Prix | (Brazil) Ayrton Senna | (Japan) Satoru Nakajima | (Belgium) Thierry Boutsen | (United Kingdom) Williams-Renault | Report |

=== Scoring system ===
Points were awarded to the top six classified finishers. For the Drivers' Championship, the best eleven results were counted, while, for the Constructors' Championship, all rounds were counted.

Numbers without parentheses are championship points; numbers in parentheses are total points scored. Points were awarded in the following system:

| Position | 1st | 2nd | 3rd | 4th | 5th | 6th |
|---|---|---|---|---|---|---|
| Race | 9 | 6 | 4 | 3 | 2 | 1 |

=== World Drivers' Championship standings ===
| Pos | Driver | BRA (Brazil) | SMR (Italy) | MON (Monaco) | MEX (Mexico) | USA (United States) | CAN (Canada) | FRA (France) | GBR (United Kingdom) | GER (West Germany) | HUN (Hungary) | BEL (Belgium) | ITA (Italy) | POR (Portugal) | ESP (Spain) | JPN (Japan) | AUS (Australia) | Points |
|---|---|---|---|---|---|---|---|---|---|---|---|---|---|---|---|---|---|---|
| 1 | (France) Alain Prost | 2 | 2^{F} | 2^{F} | (5) | 1 | Ret^{P} | 1^{P} | 1 | 2 | (4) | 2^{F} | 1^{F} | 2 | 3 | Ret^{F} | Ret | 76 (81) |
| 2 | (Brazil) Ayrton Senna | 11^{P} | 1^{P} | 1^{P} | 1^{P} | Ret^{P}^{F} | 7^{†} | Ret | Ret^{P} | 1^{P}^{F} | 2 | 1^{P} | Ret^{P} | Ret^{P} | 1^{P}^{F} | DSQ^{P} | Ret^{P} | 60 |
| 3 | (Italy) Riccardo Patrese | Ret^{F} | Ret | 15 | 2 | 2 | 2 | 3 | Ret | 4 | Ret^{P} | Ret | 4 | Ret | 5 | 2 | 3 | 40 |
| 4 | (United Kingdom) Nigel Mansell | 1 | Ret | Ret | Ret^{F} | Ret | DSQ | 2 | 2^{F} | 3 | 1^{F} | 3 | Ret | DSQ | | Ret | Ret | 38 |
| 5 | (Belgium) Thierry Boutsen | Ret | 4 | 10 | Ret | 6 | 1 | Ret | 10 | Ret | 3 | 4 | 3 | Ret | Ret | 3 | 1 | 37 |
| 6 | (Italy) Alessandro Nannini | 6 | 3 | 8 | 4 | Ret | DSQ | Ret | 3 | Ret | Ret | 5 | Ret | 4 | Ret | 1 | 2 | 32 |
| 7 | (Austria) Gerhard Berger | Ret | Ret | | Ret | Ret | Ret | Ret | Ret | Ret | Ret | Ret | 2 | 1^{F} | 2 | Ret | Ret | 21 |
| 8 | (Brazil) Nelson Piquet | Ret | Ret | Ret | 11 | Ret | 4 | 8 | 4 | 5 | 6 | DNQ | Ret | Ret | 8 | 4 | Ret | 12 |
| 9 | (France) Jean Alesi | | | | | | | 4 | Ret | 10 | 9 | | 5 | | 4 | Ret | Ret | 8 |
| 10 | (United Kingdom) Derek Warwick | 5 | 5 | Ret | Ret | Ret | Ret | | 9 | 6 | 10 | 6 | Ret | Ret | 9 | 6 | Ret | 7 |
| 11 | (United States) Eddie Cheever | Ret | 9 | 7 | 7 | 3 | Ret | 7 | DNQ | 12^{†} | 5 | Ret | DNQ | Ret | Ret | 8 | Ret | 6 |
| 12 | (Sweden) Stefan Johansson | DNPQ | DNPQ | DNPQ | Ret | Ret | DSQ | 5 | DNPQ | Ret | Ret | 8 | DNPQ | 3 | DNPQ | DNPQ | DNPQ | 6 |
| 13 | (Italy) Michele Alboreto | 10 | DNQ | 5 | 3 | Ret | Ret | | | Ret | Ret | Ret | Ret | 11 | DNPQ | DNQ | DNPQ | 6 |
| 14 | (United Kingdom) Johnny Herbert | 4 | 11 | 14 | 15 | 5 | DNQ | | | | | Ret | | DNQ | | | | 5 |
| 15 | (Italy) Pierluigi Martini | Ret | Ret | Ret | Ret | Ret | Ret | Ret | 5 | 9 | Ret | 9 | 7 | 5 | Ret | | 6 | 5 |
| 16 | (Brazil) Maurício Gugelmin | 3 | Ret | Ret | DNQ | DSQ | Ret | NC^{F} | Ret | Ret | Ret | 7 | Ret | 10 | Ret | 7 | 7 | 4 |
| 17 | (Italy) Andrea de Cesaris | 13 | 10 | 13 | Ret | 8 | 3 | DNQ | Ret | 7 | Ret | 11 | Ret | Ret | 7 | 10 | Ret | 4 |
| 18 | (Italy) Stefano Modena | Ret | Ret | 3 | 10 | Ret | Ret | Ret | Ret | Ret | 11 | Ret | EX | 14 | Ret | Ret | 8 | 4 |
| 19 | (Italy) Alex Caffi | DNPQ | 7 | 4 | 13 | Ret | 6 | Ret | DNPQ | Ret | 7 | Ret | 11^{†} | Ret | Ret | 9 | Ret | 4 |
| 20 | (United Kingdom) Martin Brundle | Ret | Ret | 6 | 9 | Ret | DNPQ | DNPQ | Ret | 8 | 12 | Ret | 6 | 8 | Ret | 5 | Ret | 4 |
| 21 | (Japan) Satoru Nakajima | 8 | NC | DNQ | Ret | Ret | DNQ | Ret | 8 | Ret | Ret | DNQ | 10^{†} | 7 | Ret | Ret | 4^{F} | 3 |
| 22 | (West Germany) Christian Danner | 14 | DNQ | DNQ | 12 | 4 | 8 | DNQ | DNQ | DNQ | DNQ | DNQ | DNQ | DNQ | | | | 3 |
| 23 | (Italy) Emanuele Pirro | | | | | | | 9 | 11 | Ret | 8 | 10 | Ret | Ret | Ret | Ret | 5 | 2 |
| 24 | (France) René Arnoux | DNQ | DNQ | 12 | 14 | DNQ | 5 | Ret | DNQ | 11 | DNQ | Ret | 9 | 13 | DNQ | DNQ | Ret | 2 |
| 25 | (United Kingdom) Jonathan Palmer | 7 | 6 | 9 | Ret | 9^{†} | Ret^{F} | 10 | Ret | Ret | 13 | 14 | Ret | 6 | 10 | Ret | DNQ | 2 |
| 26 | (France) Olivier Grouillard | 9 | DSQ | Ret | 8 | DNQ | DNQ | 6 | 7 | Ret | DNQ | 13 | Ret | DNQ | Ret | Ret | Ret | 1 |
| 27 | (Italy) Gabriele Tarquini | WD | 8 | Ret | 6 | 7^{†} | Ret | Ret | DNQ | DNPQ | DNPQ | DNPQ | DNPQ | DNPQ | DNPQ | DNPQ | DNPQ | 1 |
| 28 | (Spain) Luis Pérez-Sala | Ret | Ret | Ret | DNQ | Ret | Ret | DNQ | 6 | DNQ | Ret | 15 | 8 | 12 | Ret | Ret | DNQ | 1 |
| 29 | (France) Philippe Alliot | 12 | Ret | Ret | NC | Ret | Ret | Ret | Ret | Ret | DNPQ | 16^{†} | Ret | 9 | 6 | Ret | Ret | 1 |
| — | (Italy) Ivan Capelli | Ret | Ret | 11^{†} | Ret | Ret | Ret | Ret | Ret | Ret | Ret | 12 | Ret | Ret | Ret | Ret | Ret | 0 |
| — | (France) Éric Bernard | | | | | | | 11 | Ret | | | | | | | | | 0 |
| — | (Belgium) Bertrand Gachot | DNPQ | DNPQ | DNPQ | DNPQ | DNPQ | DNPQ | 13^{†} | 12 | DNQ | Ret | Ret | Ret | | | DNQ | DNQ | 0 |
| — | (Italy) Nicola Larini | DSQ | 12^{†} | DNPQ | DNPQ | DNPQ | Ret | DNPQ | Ret | DNPQ | DNPQ | DNPQ | Ret | DNPQ | Ret | Ret | Ret | 0 |
| — | (United Kingdom) Martin Donnelly | | | | | | | 12 | | | | | | | | | | 0 |
| — | (Brazil) Roberto Moreno | DNQ | DNQ | Ret | DNQ | DNQ | Ret | DNQ | Ret | DNPQ | DNPQ | DNPQ | DNPQ | Ret | DNPQ | DNPQ | DNPQ | 0 |
| — | (Italy) Piercarlo Ghinzani | DNPQ | DNPQ | DNPQ | DNPQ | DNPQ | DNPQ | DNPQ | DNPQ | DNPQ | Ret | DNPQ | DNPQ | DNPQ | Ret | DNPQ | Ret | 0 |
| — | (West Germany) Bernd Schneider | Ret | DNPQ | DNPQ | DNPQ | DNPQ | DNPQ | DNPQ | DNPQ | DNPQ | DNPQ | DNPQ | DNPQ | DNPQ | DNPQ | Ret | DNPQ | 0 |
| — | (Finland) JJ Lehto | | | | | | | | | | | | | DNPQ | Ret | DNPQ | Ret | 0 |
| — | (France) Pierre-Henri Raphanel | DNPQ | DNPQ | Ret | DNPQ | DNPQ | DNPQ | DNPQ | DNPQ | DNPQ | DNPQ | DNQ | DNQ | DNQ | DNQ | DNQ | DNQ | 0 |
| — | (France) Yannick Dalmas | DNQ | DNS | DNQ | DNQ | DNQ | DNQ | | DNPQ | DNPQ | DNPQ | DNPQ | DNPQ | DNPQ | DNPQ | DNPQ | DNPQ | 0 |
| — | (Italy) Paolo Barilla | | | | | | | | | | | | | | | Ret | | 0 |
| — | (Switzerland) Gregor Foitek | DNQ | DNPQ | DNPQ | DNPQ | DNPQ | DNPQ | DNPQ | DNPQ | DNPQ | DNPQ | DNPQ | | | DNQ | | | 0 |
| — | (West Germany) Volker Weidler | DNPQ | DNPQ | DNPQ | DNPQ | DNPQ | DNPQ | DNPQ | DNPQ | EX | DNQ | | | | | | | 0 |
| — | (Japan) Aguri Suzuki | DNPQ | DNPQ | DNPQ | DNPQ | DNPQ | DNPQ | DNPQ | DNPQ | DNPQ | DNPQ | DNPQ | DNPQ | DNPQ | DNPQ | DNPQ | DNPQ | 0 |
| — | (West Germany) Joachim Winkelhock | DNPQ | DNPQ | DNPQ | DNPQ | DNPQ | DNPQ | DNPQ | | | | | | | | | | 0 |
| — | (Italy) Enrico Bertaggia | | | | | | | | | | | DNPQ | DNPQ | DNPQ | DNPQ | DNPQ | DNPQ | 0 |
| — | (Argentina) Oscar Larrauri | | | | | | | | | | | | DNPQ | DNPQ | DNPQ | DNPQ | DNPQ | 0 |
| Pos | Driver | BRA (Brazil) | SMR (Italy) | MON (Monaco) | MEX (Mexico) | USA (United States) | CAN (Canada) | FRA (France) | GBR (United Kingdom) | GER (West Germany) | HUN (Hungary) | BEL (Belgium) | ITA (Italy) | POR (Portugal) | ESP (Spain) | JPN (Japan) | AUS (Australia) | Points |

Key
| Colour | Result |
|---|---|
| Gold | Winner |
| Silver | Second place |
| Bronze | Third place |
| Green | Other points position |
| Blue | Other classified position |
| Blue | Not classified, finished (NC) |
| Purple | Not classified, retired (Ret) |
| Red | Did not qualify (DNQ) |
| Red | Did not pre-qualify (DNPQ) |
| Black | Disqualified (DSQ) |
| White | Did not start (DNS) |
| White | Race cancelled (C) |
| Blank | Did not practice (DNP) |
| Blank | Excluded (EX) |
| Blank | Did not arrive (DNA) |
| Blank | Withdrawn (WD) |
| Blank | Did not enter (empty cell) |
| Annotation | Meaning |
| P | Pole position |
| F | Fastest lap |
| † | Did not finish, but classified for completing over 90% of the race distance |

^{†} Driver did not finish the Grand Prix, but was classified as he completed over 90% of the race distance.

=== World Constructors' Championship standings ===
| Pos. | Constructor | No. | BRA (Brazil) | SMR (Italy) | MON (Monaco) | MEX (Mexico) | USA (United States) | CAN (Canada) | FRA (France) | GBR (United Kingdom) | GER (West Germany) | HUN (Hungary) | BEL (Belgium) | ITA (Italy) | POR (Portugal) | ESP (Spain) | JPN (Japan) | AUS (Australia) | Points |
|---|---|---|---|---|---|---|---|---|---|---|---|---|---|---|---|---|---|---|---|
| 1 | (United Kingdom) McLaren-Honda | 1 | 11^{P} | 1^{P} | 1^{P} | 1^{P} | Ret^{P}^{F} | 7 | Ret | Ret^{P} | 1^{P}^{F} | 2 | 1^{P} | Ret^{P} | Ret^{P} | 1^{P}^{F} | DSQ^{P} | Ret^{P} | 141 |
| 1 | (United Kingdom) McLaren-Honda | 2 | 2 | 2^{F} | 2^{F} | 5 | 1 | Ret^{P} | 1^{P} | 1 | 2 | 4 | 2^{F} | 1^{F} | 2 | 3 | Ret^{F} | Ret | 141 |
| 2 | (United Kingdom) Williams-Renault | 5 | Ret | 4 | 10 | Ret | 6 | 1 | Ret | 10 | Ret | 3 | 4 | 3 | Ret | Ret | 3 | 1 | 77 |
| 2 | (United Kingdom) Williams-Renault | 6 | Ret^{F} | Ret | 15 | 2 | 2 | 2 | 3 | Ret | 4 | Ret^{P} | Ret | 4 | Ret | 5 | 2 | 3 | 77 |
| 3 | (Italy) Ferrari | 27 | 1 | Ret | Ret | Ret^{F} | Ret | DSQ | 2 | 2^{F} | 3 | 1^{F} | 3 | Ret | DSQ | | Ret | Ret | 59 |
| 3 | (Italy) Ferrari | 28 | Ret | Ret | | Ret | Ret | Ret | Ret | Ret | Ret | Ret | Ret | 2 | 1^{F} | 2 | Ret | Ret | 59 |
| 4 | (United Kingdom) Benetton-Ford | 19 | 6 | 3 | 8 | 4 | Ret | DSQ | Ret | 3 | Ret | Ret | 5 | Ret | 4 | Ret | 1 | 2 | 39 |
| 4 | (United Kingdom) Benetton-Ford | 20 | 4 | 11 | 14 | 15 | 5 | DNQ | 9 | 11 | Ret | 8 | 10 | Ret | Ret | Ret | Ret | 5 | 39 |
| 5 | (United Kingdom) Tyrrell-Ford | 3 | 7 | 6 | 9 | Ret | 9 | Ret^{F} | 10 | Ret | Ret | 13 | 14 | Ret | 6 | 10 | Ret | DNQ | 16 |
| 5 | (United Kingdom) Tyrrell-Ford | 4 | 10 | DNQ | 5 | 3 | Ret | Ret | 4 | Ret | 10 | 9 | Ret | 5 | DNQ | 4 | Ret | Ret | 16 |
| 6 | (United Kingdom) Lotus-Judd | 11 | Ret | Ret | Ret | 11 | Ret | 4 | 8 | 4 | 5 | 6 | DNQ | Ret | Ret | 8 | 4 | Ret | 15 |
| 6 | (United Kingdom) Lotus-Judd | 12 | 8 | NC | DNQ | Ret | Ret | DNQ | Ret | 8 | Ret | Ret | DNQ | 10 | 7 | Ret | Ret | 4^{F} | 15 |
| 7 | (United Kingdom) Arrows-Ford | 9 | 5 | 5 | Ret | Ret | Ret | Ret | 12 | 9 | 6 | 10 | 6 | Ret | Ret | 9 | 6 | Ret | 13 |
| 7 | (United Kingdom) Arrows-Ford | 10 | Ret | 9 | 7 | 7 | 3 | Ret | 7 | DNQ | 12 | 5 | Ret | DNQ | Ret | Ret | 8 | Ret | 13 |
| 8 | (Italy) Dallara-Ford | 21 | DNPQ | 7 | 4 | 13 | Ret | 6 | Ret | DNPQ | Ret | 7 | Ret | 11 | Ret | Ret | 9 | Ret | 8 |
| 8 | (Italy) Dallara-Ford | 22 | 13 | 10 | 13 | Ret | 8 | 3 | DNQ | Ret | 7 | Ret | 11 | Ret | Ret | 7 | 10 | Ret | 8 |
| 9 | (United Kingdom) Brabham-Judd | 7 | Ret | Ret | 6 | 9 | Ret | DNPQ | DNPQ | Ret | 8 | 12 | Ret | 6 | 8 | Ret | 5 | Ret | 8 |
| 9 | (United Kingdom) Brabham-Judd | 8 | Ret | Ret | 3 | 10 | Ret | Ret | Ret | Ret | Ret | 11 | Ret | EX | 14 | Ret | Ret | 8 | 8 |
| 10 | (United Kingdom) Onyx-Ford | 36 | DNPQ | DNPQ | DNPQ | Ret | Ret | DSQ | 5 | DNPQ | Ret | Ret | 8 | DNPQ | 3 | DNPQ | DNPQ | DNPQ | 6 |
| 10 | (United Kingdom) Onyx-Ford | 37 | DNPQ | DNPQ | DNPQ | DNPQ | DNPQ | DNPQ | 13 | 12 | DNQ | Ret | Ret | Ret | DNPQ | Ret | DNPQ | Ret | 6 |
| 11 | (Italy) Minardi-Ford | 23 | Ret | Ret | Ret | Ret | Ret | Ret | Ret | 5 | 9 | Ret | 9 | 7 | 5 | Ret | Ret | 6 | 6 |
| 11 | (Italy) Minardi-Ford | 24 | Ret | Ret | Ret | DNQ | Ret | Ret | DNQ | 6 | DNQ | Ret | 15 | 8 | 12 | Ret | Ret | DNQ | 6 |
| 12 | (United Kingdom) March-Judd | 15 | 3 | Ret | Ret | DNQ | Ret | Ret | NC^{F} | Ret | Ret | Ret | 7 | Ret | 10 | Ret | 7 | 7 | 4 |
| 12 | (United Kingdom) March-Judd | 16 | Ret | Ret | 11 | Ret | Ret | Ret | Ret | Ret | Ret | Ret | 12 | Ret | Ret | Ret | Ret | Ret | 4 |
| 13 | (West Germany) Rial-Ford | 38 | 14 | DNQ | DNQ | 12 | 4 | 8 | DNQ | DNQ | DNQ | DNQ | DNQ | DNQ | DNQ | DNQ | DNQ | DNQ | 3 |
| 13 | (West Germany) Rial-Ford | 39 | DNPQ | DNPQ | DNPQ | DNPQ | DNPQ | DNPQ | DNPQ | DNPQ | EX | DNQ | DNQ | DNQ | DNQ | DNQ | DNQ | DNQ | 3 |
| 14 | (France) Ligier-Ford | 25 | DNQ | DNQ | 12 | 14 | DNQ | 5 | Ret | DNQ | 11 | DNQ | Ret | 9 | 13 | DNQ | DNQ | Ret | 3 |
| 14 | (France) Ligier-Ford | 26 | 9 | DSQ | Ret | 8 | DNQ | DNQ | 6 | 7 | Ret | DNQ | 13 | Ret | DNQ | Ret | Ret | Ret | 3 |
| 15 | (France) AGS-Ford | 40 | | 8 | Ret | 6 | 7 | Ret | Ret | DNQ | DNPQ | DNPQ | DNPQ | DNPQ | DNPQ | DNPQ | DNPQ | DNPQ | 1 |
| 15 | (France) AGS-Ford | 41 | DNPQ | DNPQ | DNPQ | DNPQ | DNPQ | DNPQ | DNPQ | DNPQ | DNPQ | DNPQ | DNPQ | DNPQ | DNPQ | DNPQ | DNPQ | DNPQ | 1 |
| 16 | (United Kingdom) Lola-Lamborghini | 29 | DNQ | DNS | DNQ | DNQ | DNQ | DNQ | 11 | Ret | Ret | Ret | Ret | Ret | 11 | DNPQ | DNQ | DNPQ | 1 |
| 16 | (United Kingdom) Lola-Lamborghini | 30 | 12 | Ret | Ret | NC | Ret | Ret | Ret | Ret | Ret | DNPQ | 16 | Ret | 9 | 6 | Ret | Ret | 1 |
| — | (Italy) Osella-Ford | 17 | DSQ | 12 | DNPQ | DNPQ | DNPQ | Ret | DNPQ | Ret | DNPQ | DNPQ | DNPQ | Ret | DNPQ | Ret | Ret | Ret | 0 |
| — | (Italy) Osella-Ford | 18 | DNPQ | DNPQ | DNPQ | DNPQ | DNPQ | DNPQ | DNPQ | DNPQ | DNPQ | Ret | DNPQ | DNPQ | DNPQ | Ret | DNPQ | Ret | 0 |
| — | (Italy) Coloni-Ford | 31 | DNQ | DNQ | Ret | DNQ | DNQ | Ret | DNQ | Ret | DNPQ | DNPQ | DNPQ | DNPQ | Ret | DNPQ | DNPQ | DNPQ | 0 |
| — | (Italy) Coloni-Ford | 32 | DNPQ | DNPQ | Ret | DNPQ | DNPQ | DNPQ | DNPQ | DNPQ | DNPQ | DNPQ | DNPQ | DNPQ | DNPQ | DNPQ | DNPQ | DNPQ | 0 |
| — | (West Germany) Zakspeed-Yamaha | 34 | Ret | DNPQ | DNPQ | DNPQ | DNPQ | DNPQ | DNPQ | DNPQ | DNPQ | DNPQ | DNPQ | DNPQ | DNPQ | DNPQ | Ret | DNPQ | 0 |
| — | (West Germany) Zakspeed-Yamaha | 35 | DNPQ | DNPQ | DNPQ | DNPQ | DNPQ | DNPQ | DNPQ | DNPQ | DNPQ | DNPQ | DNPQ | DNPQ | DNPQ | DNPQ | DNPQ | DNPQ | 0 |
| — | (Italy) EuroBrun-Judd | 33 | DNQ | DNPQ | DNPQ | DNPQ | DNPQ | DNPQ | DNPQ | DNPQ | DNPQ | DNPQ | DNPQ | DNPQ | DNPQ | DNPQ | DNPQ | DNPQ | 0 |
| — | (Italy) FIRST-Judd | 42 | WD | | | | | | | | | | | | | | | | 0 |
| Pos | Constructor | Car no. | BRA (Brazil) | SMR (Italy) | MON (Monaco) | MEX (Mexico) | USA (United States) | CAN (Canada) | FRA (France) | GBR (United Kingdom) | GER (West Germany) | HUN (Hungary) | BEL (Belgium) | ITA (Italy) | POR (Portugal) | ESP (Spain) | JPN (Japan) | AUS (Australia) | Pts |

== Non-championship event results ==
The 1989 season also included a single event which did not count towards the World Championship, the Formula One Indoor Trophy at the Bologna Motor Show.

| Race name | Venue | Date | Winning driver | Constructor | Report |
|---|---|---|---|---|---|
| (Italy) Formula One Indoor Trophy | Bologna Motor Show | 2, 3 December | (Spain) Luis Perez-Sala | (Italy) Minardi | Report |
