= 1989 Mexican Grand Prix =

- Race 4 of 16 in the 1989 Formula One World Championship

Race details
- Date: 28 May 1989
- Official name: XIII Gran Premio de México
- Location: Autódromo Hermanos Rodríguez; Magdalena Mixhuca, Mexico City
- Course: Permanent racing facility
- Course length: 4.421 km (2.747 miles)
- Distance: 69 laps, 305.049 km (189.549 miles)
- Weather: Hot, dry, partly sunny 25°C/79°F, 40% Humidity, wind NW-10mph

Pole position
Driver	(Brazil) Ayrton Senna	McLaren-Honda
- Time: 1:17.876

Fastest lap
Driver	(United Kingdom) Nigel Mansell	Ferrari
- Time: 1:20.420 on lap 41

Podium
First	(Brazil) Ayrton Senna	McLaren-Honda
Second	(Italy) Riccardo Patrese	Williams-Renault
Third	(Italy) Michele Alboreto	Tyrrell-Ford

The 1989 Mexican Grand Prix was a Formula One motor race held at the Autódromo Hermanos Rodríguez, Mexico City on 28 May 1989. The race, contested over 69 laps, was the fourth race of the 1989 Formula One season and was won from pole position by Ayrton Senna, driving a McLaren-Honda, with Riccardo Patrese second in a Williams-Renault and Michele Alboreto third in a Tyrrell-Ford. It was McLaren's last win in Mexico until 2025.

== Qualifying ==
=== Pre-qualifying report ===
The Friday morning pre-qualifying session produced another 1–2 for the Brabham team, their third of the four Grands Prix so far. This time Martin Brundle was fastest ahead of Stefano Modena, with the Dallara of Alex Caffi pre-qualifying in third. The fourth-placed driver was Stefan Johansson in the Onyx, who went through to the main qualifying sessions for the first time this season, at the expense of his team-mate Bertrand Gachot, who was fifth fastest.

Although failing to pre-qualify, Gregor Foitek had one of his better sessions, finishing sixth fastest in the sole EuroBrun, ahead of the Osella of Nicola Larini, who suffered a fuel pump issue. Larini had been lined up to replace Gerhard Berger at Ferrari had the Austrian not been fit to return to the cockpit after his Imola accident. Volker Weidler was eighth in the Rial, also one of his better performances of the season despite having gearing problems. Next were the two Zakspeeds of Bernd Schneider and Aguri Suzuki, and the other Osella, driven by Piercarlo Ghinzani. Ghinzani was excluded anyway after ignoring a weight check signal. At the bottom of the time sheets were Joachim Winkelhock in the AGS, and lastly Pierre-Henri Raphanel, who did not post a representative lap time in the Coloni FC188B after his strong performance in the last race at Monaco. Coloni had only brought three mechanics and one car for both Raphanel and Roberto Moreno, while waiting for their new C3 to be built, making a token effort to qualify in order to comply with the regulations and avoid a fine.

=== Pre-qualifying classification ===
Pos	No	Driver	Constructor	Time	Gap
1	7	(United Kingdom) Martin Brundle	Brabham-Judd	1:21.770	—
2	8	(Italy) Stefano Modena	Brabham-Judd	1:22.211	+0.441
3	21	(Italy) Alex Caffi	Dallara-Ford	1:22.876	+1.106
4	36	(Sweden) Stefan Johansson	Onyx-Ford	1:23.288	+1.518
5	37	(Belgium) Bertrand Gachot	Onyx-Ford	1:23.752	+1.982
6	33	(Switzerland) Gregor Foitek	EuroBrun-Judd	1.24.351	+2.581
7	17	(Italy) Nicola Larini	Osella-Ford	1:24.392	+2.622
8	39	(Germany) Volker Weidler	Rial-Ford	1:24.966	+3.196
9	34	(Germany) Bernd Schneider	Zakspeed-Yamaha	1:25.418	+3.648
10	35	(Japan) Aguri Suzuki	Zakspeed-Yamaha	1:25.658	+3.888
11	18	(Italy) Piercarlo Ghinzani	Osella-Ford	1:26.065	+4.295
12	41	(Germany) Joachim Winkelhock	AGS-Ford	1:26.754	+4.984
13	32	(France) Pierre-Henri Raphanel	Coloni-Ford	1:34.357	+12.587

=== Qualifying report ===
In qualifying proper, World Champion Ayrton Senna scored his 33rd career pole position, equalling the long-standing record held by Jim Clark. Senna's pole time in his McLaren-Honda was 0.408 slower than his pole time in 1988 in the turbocharged McLaren MP4/4. His McLaren teammate Alain Prost was second fastest with the Ferrari 640 of Nigel Mansell third. Mansell's teammate Gerhard Berger, returning to action in Mexico after his crash at San Marino, was sixth, the Ferraris split by the March-Judd of Ivan Capelli and the Williams-Renault of Riccardo Patrese. Surprisingly, Capelli's teammate Maurício Gugelmin failed to qualify. The 26 year old Brazilian had been 15th after Friday's qualifying and although improving his time by over 6/10ths of a second on Saturday, others improving by more saw him drop to 28th and not qualifying.

Berger, still suffering the effects of his crash, admitted that if not for Ferrari's innovative semi-automatic transmission (which meant he did not have to change gears as with a normal stick shift), he would not have been able to race.

The back row of the grid could be considered the best credentialed and most experienced in Grand Prix history, consisting of seven-time winner René Arnoux in the Ligier-Ford and triple World Champion Nelson Piquet in the Lotus-Judd. Piquet had scraped onto the grid just 0.104 seconds ahead of the Minardi-Ford of Spaniard Luis Pérez-Sala.

=== Qualifying classification ===
Pos	No	Driver	Constructor	Q1	Q2	Gap
1	1	(Brazil) Ayrton Senna	McLaren-Honda	1:19.112	1:17.876	—
2	2	(France) Alain Prost	McLaren-Honda	1:20.401	1:18.773	+0.897
3	27	(United Kingdom) Nigel Mansell	Ferrari	1:21.170	1:19.137	+1.261
4	16	(Italy) Ivan Capelli	March-Judd	1:24.720	1:19.337	+1.461
5	6	(Italy) Riccardo Patrese	Williams-Renault	1:21.763	1:19.656	+1.780
6	28	(Austria) Gerhard Berger	Ferrari	1:21.564	1:19.835	+1.959
7	4	(Italy) Michele Alboreto	Tyrrell-Ford	1:22.150	1:20.066	+2.190
8	5	(Belgium) Thierry Boutsen	Williams-Renault	1:21.456	1:20.234	+2.358
9	8	(Italy) Stefano Modena	Brabham-Judd	1:22.640	1:20.505	+2.629
10	9	(United Kingdom) Derek Warwick	Arrows-Ford	1:23.245	1:20.601	+2.725
11	26	(France) Olivier Grouillard	Ligier-Ford	1:23.053	1:20.859	+2.983
12	22	(Italy) Andrea de Cesaris	Dallara-Ford	1:23.066	1:20.873	+2.997
13	19	(Italy) Alessandro Nannini	Benetton-Ford	1:21.791	1:20.888	+3.012
14	3	(United Kingdom) Jonathan Palmer	Tyrrell-Ford	1:21.561	1:20.888	+3.012
15	12	(Japan) Satoru Nakajima	Lotus-Judd	1:22.438	1:20.943	+3.067
16	30	(France) Philippe Alliot	Lola-Lamborghini	1:22.014	1:21.031	+3.155
17	40	(Italy) Gabriele Tarquini	AGS-Ford	1:23.004	1:21.031	+3.155
18	20	(United Kingdom) Johnny Herbert	Benetton-Ford	1:22.553	1:21.105	+3.229
19	21	(Italy) Alex Caffi	Dallara-Ford	1:22.705	1:21.139	+3.263
20	7	(United Kingdom) Martin Brundle	Brabham-Judd	1:23.375	1:21.217	+3.341
21	36	(Sweden) Stefan Johansson	Onyx-Ford	1:23.746	1:21.358	+3.482
22	23	(Italy) Pierluigi Martini	Minardi-Ford	1:24.181	1:21.471	+3.595
23	38	(Germany) Christian Danner	Rial-Ford	1:22.931	1:21.696	+3.820
24	10	(United States) Eddie Cheever	Arrows-Ford	1:23.427	1:21.716	+3.840
25	25	(France) René Arnoux	Ligier-Ford	1:24.890	1:21.830	+3.954
26	11	(Brazil) Nelson Piquet	Lotus-Judd	1:23.090	1:21.831	+3.955
27	24	(Spain) Luis Pérez-Sala	Minardi-Ford	1:26.567	1:21.935	+4.059
28	15	(Brazil) Maurício Gugelmin	March-Judd	1:22.712	1:22.081	+4.205
29	29	(France) Yannick Dalmas	Lola-Lamborghini	1:25.651	9:27.789	+7.775
30	31	(Brazil) Roberto Moreno	Coloni-Ford	no time	3:34.095	+2:16.219

== Race ==
=== Race report ===
Senna chose medium compound Goodyear "B" tyres for the race while Prost went for the softer C-compound tyres in the hopes of gaining a speed advantage. Despite the pole being on the dirty side of the track in Mexico, Senna made a better start and was able to lead into the first turn from Mansell, Prost, Berger, Patrese and the Tyrrell-Ford of Michele Alboreto. However, it all meant nothing as Modena spun his Brabham into the Peraltada on the first lap and was tapped by the Ligier of Olivier Grouillard and finished against the tyre wall. Despite the car not being in a dangerous position, the red flag was shown and the race had to be restarted.

Senna won the restart and led Prost, a fast starting Berger, Mansell and the Williams pair of Patrese and Thierry Boutsen. Prost, with his softer tyres giving him better grip, soon moved onto the back of his teammate's car. However, Mexico would be where Prost started questioning the power of his Honda V10 compared to the ones used by Senna. For a number of laps Prost, clearly faster through the final Peraltada curve coming onto the main straight, could not make an impression on Senna despite being in his aerodynamic tow on the 1.2 km long main straight. Indeed, the #1 McLaren was seen to pull away from the #2 car on the straight. Running close to his teammate eventually had a detrimental effect on Prost's tyres and he was soon into the pits for a change of rubber. The McLaren team then mistakenly gave the Frenchman another set of "C" tyres rather than the "B"s he had come in for. Prost was soon back in for another tyre change and went back into the race only seconds in front of Senna who now had nearly a lap lead over his closest championship rival. Despite being on far fresher tyres than his teammate, Prost still lost ground to Senna and was eventually lapped when the Brazilian swept past on the main straight, fuelling Prost's claims that his engines were down on power compared to Senna's. McLaren team boss Ron Dennis later publicly apologised to Prost for the error in his pit stop.

Both Ferraris ran well until Berger's race ended on lap 16 with transmission failure while Mansell's gearbox lasted until lap 43. This left the Williams of Patrese in second place with Alboreto a surprising third. This was how the top three finished with Alessandro Nannini fourth in his Benetton B188. The Benetton team had hoped to have their new B189 available in Mexico, but ongoing problems with the new Ford HB engine meant the team had to continue using their 1988 car and engines. Prost, having unlapped himself, finished fifth to be the last car on the lead lap, while Italian Gabriele Tarquini scored the final point for sixth in his AGS-Ford, which proved to be his only point in Formula One, as well as the last for the AGS team.

=== Race classification ===
Pos	No	Driver	Constructor	Laps	Time/Retired	Grid	Points
1	1	(Brazil) Ayrton Senna	McLaren-Honda	69	1:35:21.431	1	9
2	6	(Italy) Riccardo Patrese	Williams-Renault	69	+ 15.560	5	6
3	4	(Italy) Michele Alboreto	Tyrrell-Ford	69	+ 31.254	7	4
4	19	(Italy) Alessandro Nannini	Benetton-Ford	69	+ 45.495	13	3
5	2	(France) Alain Prost	McLaren-Honda	69	+ 56.113	2	2
6	40	(Italy) Gabriele Tarquini	AGS-Ford	68	+ 1 lap	17	1
7	10	(United States) Eddie Cheever	Arrows-Ford	68	+ 1 lap	24	
8	26	(France) Olivier Grouillard	Ligier-Ford	68	+ 1 lap	11	
9	7	(United Kingdom) Martin Brundle	Brabham-Judd	68	+ 1 lap	20	
10	8	(Italy) Stefano Modena	Brabham-Judd	68	+ 1 lap	9	
11	11	(Brazil) Nelson Piquet	Lotus-Judd	68	+ 1 lap	26	
12	38	(Germany) Christian Danner	Rial-Ford	67	+ 2 laps	23	
13	21	(Italy) Alex Caffi	Dallara-Ford	67	+ 2 laps	19	
14	25	(France) René Arnoux	Ligier-Ford	66	+ 3 laps	25	
15	20	(United Kingdom) Johnny Herbert	Benetton-Ford	66	+ 3 laps	18	
Ret	23	(Italy) Pierluigi Martini	Minardi-Ford	53	Engine	22	
Ret	27	(United Kingdom) Nigel Mansell	Ferrari	43	Gearbox	3	
Ret	9	(United Kingdom) Derek Warwick	Arrows-Ford	35	Electrical	10	
Ret	12	(Japan) Satoru Nakajima	Lotus-Judd	35	Spun off	15	
NC	30	(France) Philippe Alliot	Lola-Lamborghini	28	+ 41 laps	16	
Ret	22	(Italy) Andrea de Cesaris	Dallara-Ford	20	Suspension	12	
Ret	28	(Austria) Gerhard Berger	Ferrari	16	Gearbox	6	
Ret	36	(Sweden) Stefan Johansson	Onyx-Ford	16	Transmission	21	
Ret	5	(Belgium) Thierry Boutsen	Williams-Renault	15	Electrical	8	
Ret	3	(United Kingdom) Jonathan Palmer	Tyrrell-Ford	9	Throttle linkage	14	
Ret	16	(Italy) Ivan Capelli	March-Judd	1	Transmission	4	
DNQ	24	(Spain) Luis Pérez-Sala	Minardi-Ford				
DNQ	15	(Brazil) Maurício Gugelmin	March-Judd				
DNQ	29	(France) Yannick Dalmas	Lola-Lamborghini				
DNQ	31	(Brazil) Roberto Moreno	Coloni-Ford				
DNPQ	37	(Belgium) Bertrand Gachot	Onyx-Ford				
DNPQ	33	(Switzerland) Gregor Foitek	EuroBrun-Judd				
DNPQ	17	(Italy) Nicola Larini	Osella-Ford				
DNPQ	39	(Germany) Volker Weidler	Rial-Ford				
DNPQ	34	(Germany) Bernd Schneider	Zakspeed-Yamaha				
DNPQ	35	(Japan) Aguri Suzuki	Zakspeed-Yamaha				
DNPQ	18	(Italy) Piercarlo Ghinzani	Osella-Ford				
DNPQ	41	(Germany) Joachim Winkelhock	AGS-Ford				
DNPQ	32	(France) Pierre-Henri Raphanel	Coloni-Ford				

== Championship standings after the race ==
Drivers' Championship standings

Pos	Driver	Points
1	(Brazil) Ayrton Senna	27
2	(France) Alain Prost	20
3	(United Kingdom) Nigel Mansell	9
4	(Italy) Alessandro Nannini	8
5	(Italy) Riccardo Patrese	6

Constructors' Championship standings

Pos	Constructor	Points
1	(United Kingdom) McLaren-Honda	47
2	(United Kingdom) Benetton-Ford	11
3	(Italy) Ferrari	9
4	(United Kingdom) Williams-Renault	9
5	(United Kingdom) Tyrrell-Ford	7

- Note: Only the top five positions are included for both sets of standings.

Previous race: 1989 Monaco Grand Prix	FIA Formula One World Championship; 1989 season	Next race: 1989 United States Grand Prix
Previous race: 1988 Mexican Grand Prix	Mexican Grand Prix	Next race: 1990 Mexican Grand Prix
