= 1989 Hungarian Grand Prix =

- Race 10 of 16 in the 1989 Formula One World Championship

Race details
- Date: 13 August 1989
- Official name: Pop 84 Magyar Nagydíj
- Location: Hungaroring; Mogyoród, Pest, Hungary
- Course: Permanent racing facility
- Course length: 3.968 km (2.466 miles)
- Distance: 77 laps, 305.536 km (189.850 miles)
- Weather: Cloudy

Pole position
Driver	(Italy) Riccardo Patrese	Williams-Renault
- Time: 1:19.726

Fastest lap
Driver	(United Kingdom) Nigel Mansell	Ferrari
- Time: 1:22.637 on lap 66

Podium
First	(United Kingdom) Nigel Mansell	Ferrari
Second	(Brazil) Ayrton Senna	McLaren-Honda
Third	(Belgium) Thierry Boutsen	Williams-Renault

The 1989 Hungarian Grand Prix was a Formula One motor race held at Hungaroring on 13 August 1989. It was the tenth race of the 1989 Formula One World Championship.

The 77-lap race was won by Nigel Mansell, driving a Ferrari. After qualifying only 12th, Mansell charged through the field and took the lead with an opportunistic overtaking manoeuvre on Ayrton Senna in the McLaren-Honda as the two were lapping Stefan Johansson in the Onyx-Ford. Senna finished 26 seconds behind Mansell, with Thierry Boutsen third in a Williams-Renault.

Senna's teammate and Drivers' Championship rival, Alain Prost, finished fourth, meaning that his lead over Senna in the championship was reduced to 14 points.

== Qualifying ==
=== Pre-qualifying report ===
The Hungaroring had been changed from the year before; the tight, slow S-bends at Turns 3, 4 and 5 had been changed in character and bypassed. Turn 3 remained, but was now taken much faster as what were Turns 4 and 5 were bypassed, thus extending the straight now from Turn 3 into the new Turns 4 and 5; raising the circuit's average speed by 10 percent.

In the Friday morning pre-qualifying session, an Onyx topped the time sheets for the fourth Grand Prix in succession. Stefan Johansson was comfortably fastest, and his team-mate Bertrand Gachot also pre-qualified in fourth. Both drivers had re-signed with Onyx for 1990. For the first time this season, Piercarlo Ghinzani went through to the main qualifying sessions, in second place. For the third time this season, and for the first time since the US Grand Prix, he outpaced his Osella team-mate Nicola Larini, who missed out in fifth position. The Larrousse-Lola of Michele Alboreto was the other pre-qualifier in third, the Italian suffering from a cracked rib. His team-mate Philippe Alliot was down in sixth, the first time either he or a Larrousse-Lamborghini had failed to pre-qualify.

The AGS cars of Yannick Dalmas and Gabriele Tarquini were seventh and ninth respectively, while Zakspeed drivers Bernd Schneider and Aguri Suzuki, still hampered by their underpowered V8 Yamaha engines, were eighth and twelfth. Roberto Moreno was tenth in the Coloni, while his team-mate Pierre-Henri Raphanel was unable to post a representative time and was bottom of the time sheets in his last appearance for the team. Gregor Foitek was still unable to pre-qualify the new EuroBrun car, and was eleventh fastest.

=== Pre-qualifying classification ===
Pos	No	Driver	Constructor	Time	Gap
1	36	(Sweden) Stefan Johansson	Onyx-Ford	1:22.836	—
2	18	(Italy) Piercarlo Ghinzani	Osella-Ford	1:24.086	+1.250
3	29	(Italy) Michele Alboreto	Lola-Lamborghini	1:24.323	+1.487
4	37	(Belgium) Bertrand Gachot	Onyx-Ford	1:24.412	+1.576
5	17	(Italy) Nicola Larini	Osella-Ford	1:24.601	+1.765
6	30	(France) Philippe Alliot	Lola-Lamborghini	1:24.928	+2.092
7	41	(France) Yannick Dalmas	AGS-Ford	1:25.571	+2.735
8	34	(West Germany) Bernd Schneider	Zakspeed-Yamaha	1:25.613	+2.777
9	40	(Italy) Gabriele Tarquini	AGS-Ford	1:25.685	+2.849
10	31	(Brazil) Roberto Moreno	Coloni-Ford	1:26.903	+4.067
11	33	(Switzerland) Gregor Foitek	EuroBrun-Judd	1:27.478	+4.642
12	35	(Japan) Aguri Suzuki	Zakspeed-Yamaha	1:28.113	+5.277
13	32	(France) Pierre-Henri Raphanel	Coloni-Ford	1:45.971	+22.135

=== Qualifying report ===
Riccardo Patrese took a surprise pole position in his Williams-Renault, the first and only non-McLaren-Honda pole of the season, beating Ayrton Senna by three-tenths of a second. It was only the third pole of Patrese's career and his first since the 1983 Italian Grand Prix. It was also the first pole position for the Renault V10 engine.

In another surprise, Alex Caffi took third in his Dallara-Ford-Cosworth, just six-tenths behind Senna, with Thierry Boutsen fourth in the second Williams-Renault. Drivers' Championship leader Alain Prost was fifth in the second McLaren-Honda, with Gerhard Berger sixth in the V12 Ferrari. The top ten was completed by Alessandro Nannini in the Benetton-Ford, Stefano Modena in the Brabham-Judd, Derek Warwick in the Arrows Ford-Cosworth and Pierluigi Martini in the Minardi Ford-Cosworth.

Nigel Mansell could only manage 12th in the second Ferrari, nearly seven-tenths behind teammate Berger and over two seconds behind Patrese, and later complained of traffic. After realising that he would not crack the top 10 in qualifying, Mansell instead used final qualifying to work on his race set up, something he hoped would pay dividends on race day.

=== Qualifying classification ===
Pos	No	Driver	Constructor	Q1	Q2	Gap
1	6	(Italy) Riccardo Patrese	Williams-Renault	1:19.726	1:20.644	—
2	1	(Brazil) Ayrton Senna	McLaren-Honda	1:21.576	1:20.039	+0.313
3	21	(Italy) Alex Caffi	Dallara-Ford	1:21.040	1:20.704	+0.978
4	5	(Belgium) Thierry Boutsen	Williams-Renault	1:23.492	1:21.001	+1.275
5	2	(France) Alain Prost	McLaren-Honda	1:21.076	1:22.267	+1.350
6	28	(Austria) Gerhard Berger	Ferrari	1:21.304	1:21.270	+1.544
7	19	(Italy) Alessandro Nannini	Benetton-Ford	1:21.448	1:21.301	+1.575
8	8	(Italy) Stefano Modena	Brabham-Judd	1:23.090	1:21.472	+1.746
9	9	(United Kingdom) Derek Warwick	Arrows-Ford	1:23.111	1:21.617	+1.891
10	23	(Italy) Pierluigi Martini	Minardi-Ford	1:21.746	1:32.546	+2.020
11	4	(France) Jean Alesi	Tyrrell-Ford	1:23.853	1:21.799	+2.073
12	27	(United Kingdom) Nigel Mansell	Ferrari	1:22.544	1:21.951	+2.225
13	15	(Brazil) Maurício Gugelmin	March-Judd	1:22.949	1:22.083	+2.357
14	16	(Italy) Ivan Capelli	March-Judd	1:22.445	1:22.088	+2.362
15	7	(United Kingdom) Martin Brundle	Brabham-Judd	1:22.970	1:22.296	+2.570
16	10	(United States) Eddie Cheever	Arrows-Ford	1:23.251	1:22.374	+2.648
17	11	(Brazil) Nelson Piquet	Lotus-Judd	1:22.837	1:22.406	+2.680
18	22	(Italy) Andrea de Cesaris	Dallara-Ford	1:23.463	1:22.410	+2.684
19	3	(United Kingdom) Jonathan Palmer	Tyrrell-Ford	1:24.670	1:22.578	+2.852
20	12	(Japan) Satoru Nakajima	Lotus-Judd	1:23.996	1:22.630	+2.904
21	37	(Belgium) Bertrand Gachot	Onyx-Ford	1:22.634	1:23.720	+2.908
22	18	(Italy) Piercarlo Ghinzani	Osella-Ford	1:23.091	1:22.763	+3.037
23	24	(Spain) Luis Pérez-Sala	Minardi-Ford	1:23.017	1:24.188	+3.291
24	36	(Sweden) Stefan Johansson	Onyx-Ford	1:23.372	1:23.148	+3.422
25	20	(Italy) Emanuele Pirro	Benetton-Ford	1:23.772	1:23.399	+3.673
26	29	(Italy) Michele Alboreto	Lola-Lamborghini	1:23.733	1:25.660	+4.007
27	25	(France) René Arnoux	Ligier-Ford	1:25.862	1:24.003	+4.277
28	26	(France) Olivier Grouillard	Ligier-Ford	1:24.702	1:25.169	+4.976
29	38	(West Germany) Christian Danner	Rial-Ford	1:26.485	1:25.017	+5.291
30	39	(West Germany) Volker Weidler	Rial-Ford	1:28.112	1:26.320	+6.594

== Race ==
=== Race report ===
At the start of the race, Patrese, Senna and Caffi maintained their grid order into turn 1, while Boutsen lost out to Prost as Berger passed both of them. Further back, Mansell made a good start, rising to 8th at the first corner. It soon became clear, however, that Caffi was struggling, the Dallara unable to replicate the speed it had shown in qualifying. Before long he had been passed by both Berger and Prost, and was holding up a train of cars consisting of Boutsen, Nannini, Mansell and Warwick.

Nannini exited the train when he pulled in to change tyres. This promoted Mansell to 7th, which he quickly turned into 5th by passing Boutsen and Caffi in quick succession. He then set about closing the 17-second gap to the leaders, and was promoted to 4th when Berger pitted for tyres. Having caught up to the leading group, Mansell passed Prost for 3rd. Patrese's Williams then began to develop a problem with a holed radiator, which slowed him and bunched up the leading group. Eventually, Patrese's holed radiator became so bad that both Senna and Mansell were able to pass him in the space of a few corners. Patrese retired from the race shortly afterwards.

Mansell now began to pressure Senna, clearly faster but unable to pass due to the extra power of the McLaren's Honda engine. Meanwhile, Prost pitted for tyres and rejoined 6th, while Berger only inherited 3rd briefly before he retired with gearbox problems, leaving Senna and Mansell on their own. Eventually, the pair came up to lap Stefan Johansson's Onyx. Senna caught him at an awkward moment, just at the accelerating zone out of turn 3. The Brazilian uncharacteristically hesitated, briefly lifting off, and this allowed Mansell to draw alongside as they went past Johansson and then use the Ferrari's greater momentum to surge past Senna and take the lead. After that, Mansell had an unchallenged run to the flag, beating Senna by nearly 26 seconds, with Boutsen completing the podium. Prost overtook Eddie Cheever's Arrows for 4th on the final lap, while Nelson Piquet's Lotus rounded off the points scorers.

Many of the leading cars had problems with tyre vibrations - both Senna and Mansell complained about this, whilst Prost also had difficulties after picking up debris whilst going offline to avoid Patrese's oil.

=== Race classification ===
Pos	No	Driver	Constructor	Laps	Time/Retired	Grid	Points
1	27	(United Kingdom) Nigel Mansell	Ferrari	77	1:49:38.650	12	9
2	1	(Brazil) Ayrton Senna	McLaren-Honda	77	+ 25.967	2	6
3	5	(Belgium) Thierry Boutsen	Williams-Renault	77	+ 38.354	4	4
4	2	(France) Alain Prost	McLaren-Honda	77	+ 44.177	5	3
5	10	(United States) Eddie Cheever	Arrows-Ford	77	+ 45.106	16	2
6	11	(Brazil) Nelson Piquet	Lotus-Judd	77	+ 1:12.039	17	1
7	21	(Italy) Alex Caffi	Dallara-Ford	77	+ 1:24.225	3	
8	20	(Italy) Emanuele Pirro	Benetton-Ford	76	+ 1 Lap	25	
9	4	(France) Jean Alesi	Tyrrell-Ford	76	+ 1 Lap	11	
10	9	(United Kingdom) Derek Warwick	Arrows-Ford	76	+ 1 Lap	9	
11	8	(Italy) Stefano Modena	Brabham-Judd	76	+ 1 Lap	8	
12	7	(United Kingdom) Martin Brundle	Brabham-Judd	75	+ 2 Laps	15	
13	3	(United Kingdom) Jonathan Palmer	Tyrrell-Ford	73	+ 4 Laps	19	
Ret	24	(Spain) Luis Pérez-Sala	Minardi-Ford	57	Collision	23	
Ret	28	(Austria) Gerhard Berger	Ferrari	56	Gearbox	6	
Ret	6	(Italy) Riccardo Patrese	Williams-Renault	54	Radiator	1	
Ret	36	(Sweden) Stefan Johansson	Onyx-Ford	48	Gearbox	24	
Ret	19	(Italy) Alessandro Nannini	Benetton-Ford	46	Gearbox	7	
Ret	37	(Belgium) Bertrand Gachot	Onyx-Ford	38	Gearbox	21	
Ret	12	(Japan) Satoru Nakajima	Lotus-Judd	33	Collision	20	
Ret	15	(Brazil) Maurício Gugelmin	March-Judd	27	Electrical	13	
Ret	16	(Italy) Ivan Capelli	March-Judd	26	Wheel	14	
Ret	29	(Italy) Michele Alboreto	Lola-Lamborghini	26	Engine	26	
Ret	18	(Italy) Piercarlo Ghinzani	Osella-Ford	20	Electrical	22	
Ret	23	(Italy) Pierluigi Martini	Minardi-Ford	19	Wheel	10	
Ret	22	(Italy) Andrea de Cesaris	Dallara-Ford	0	Clutch	18	
DNQ	25	(France) René Arnoux	Ligier-Ford				
DNQ	26	(France) Olivier Grouillard	Ligier-Ford				
DNQ	38	(West Germany) Christian Danner	Rial-Ford				
DNQ	39	(West Germany) Volker Weidler	Rial-Ford				
DNPQ	17	(Italy) Nicola Larini	Osella-Ford				
DNPQ	30	(France) Philippe Alliot	Lola-Lamborghini				
DNPQ	41	(France) Yannick Dalmas	AGS-Ford				
DNPQ	34	(West Germany) Bernd Schneider	Zakspeed-Yamaha				
DNPQ	40	(Italy) Gabriele Tarquini	AGS-Ford				
DNPQ	31	(Brazil) Roberto Moreno	Coloni-Ford				
DNPQ	33	(Switzerland) Gregor Foitek	EuroBrun-Judd				
DNPQ	35	(Japan) Aguri Suzuki	Zakspeed-Yamaha				
DNPQ	32	(France) Pierre-Henri Raphanel	Coloni-Ford				

== Championship standings after the race ==
Drivers' Championship standings

Pos	Driver	Points
1	(France) Alain Prost	56
2	(Brazil) Ayrton Senna	42
3	(United Kingdom) Nigel Mansell	34
4	(Italy) Riccardo Patrese	25
5	(Belgium) Thierry Boutsen	17

Constructors' Championship standings

Pos	Constructor	Points
1	(United Kingdom) McLaren-Honda	98
2	(United Kingdom) Williams-Renault	42
3	(Italy) Ferrari	34
4	(United Kingdom) Benetton-Ford	17
5	(United Kingdom) Arrows-Ford	11

- Note: Only the top five positions are included for both sets of standings.

Previous race: 1989 German Grand Prix	FIA Formula One World Championship; 1989 season	Next race: 1989 Belgian Grand Prix
Previous race: 1988 Hungarian Grand Prix	Hungarian Grand Prix	Next race: 1990 Hungarian Grand Prix
