= Renault engine customers' Grand Prix results =

The table below details the Grand Prix results of the other teams for which Renault was an engine supplier.

== Complete Formula One results ==
=== Lotus, Ligier, Tyrrell (1983–1986) ===
(key)

Year	Entrant/s	Chassis	Engine(s)	Tyres	Drivers	1	2	3	4	5	6	7	8	9	10	11	12	13	14	15	16	Points	WCC
1983	John Player Team Lotus	Lotus 93T; Lotus 94T	EF1 1.5 V6 t	P		BRA	USW	FRA	SMR	MON	BEL	DET	CAN	GBR	GER	AUT	NED	ITA	EUR	RSA		11	8th
1983	John Player Team Lotus	Lotus 93T; Lotus 94T	EF1 1.5 V6 t	P	(United Kingdom) Nigel Mansell									4	Ret	5	Ret	8	3^{F}	Ret		11	8th
1983	John Player Team Lotus	Lotus 93T; Lotus 94T	EF1 1.5 V6 t	P	(Italy) Elio de Angelis		Ret	Ret	Ret	Ret	9	Ret	Ret	Ret	Ret	Ret	Ret	5	Ret^{P}	Ret		11	8th
1984	John Player Team Lotus	Lotus 95T	EF4B 1.5 V6 t	G		BRA	RSA	BEL	SMR	FRA	MON	CAN	DET	DAL	GBR	GER	AUT	NED	ITA	EUR	POR	47	3rd
1984	John Player Team Lotus	Lotus 95T	EF4B 1.5 V6 t	G	(United Kingdom) Nigel Mansell	Ret	Ret	Ret	Ret	3	Ret	6	Ret	6^{P}	Ret	4	Ret	3	Ret	Ret	Ret	47	3rd
1984	John Player Team Lotus	Lotus 95T	EF4B 1.5 V6 t	G	(Italy) Elio de Angelis	3^{P}	7	5	3	5	5^{‡}	4	2	3	4	Ret	Ret	4	Ret	Ret	5	47	3rd
1984	Ligier Loto	Ligier JS23	EF4 1.5 V6 t	MI	(France) François Hesnault	Ret	10	Ret	Ret	DNS	Ret	Ret	Ret	Ret	Ret	8	8	7	Ret	10	Ret	3	10th
1984	Ligier Loto	Ligier JS23	EF4 1.5 V6 t	MI	(Italy) Andrea de Cesaris	Ret	5	Ret	6	10	Ret	Ret	Ret	Ret	10	7	Ret	Ret	Ret	7	12	3	10th
1985	John Player Special Team Lotus	Lotus 97T	EF15 1.5 V6 t	G		BRA	POR	SMR	MON	CAN	DET	FRA	GBR	GER	AUT	NED	ITA	BEL	EUR	RSA	AUS	71	4th
1985	John Player Special Team Lotus	Lotus 97T	EF15 1.5 V6 t	G	(Brazil) Ayrton Senna	Ret	1^{P}^{F}	7^{P}	Ret^{P}	16^{F}	Ret^{P}^{F}	Ret	10	Ret	2	3	3^{P}	1	2^{P}	Ret	Ret^{P}	71	4th
1985	John Player Special Team Lotus	Lotus 97T	EF15 1.5 V6 t	G	(Italy) Elio de Angelis	3	4	1	3	5^{P}	5	5	NC	Ret	5	5	6	Ret	5	Ret	DSQ	71	4th
1985	Equipe Ligier Gitanes	Ligier JS25	EF4B 1.5 V6 t	P	(Italy) Andrea de Cesaris	Ret	Ret	Ret	4	14	10	Ret	Ret	Ret	Ret	Ret						23	6th
1985	Equipe Ligier Gitanes	Ligier JS25	EF4B 1.5 V6 t	P	(France) Philippe Streiff												10	9	8	WD	3	23	6th
1985	Equipe Ligier Gitanes	Ligier JS25	EF4B 1.5 V6 t	P	(France) Jacques Laffite	6	Ret	Ret	6	8	12	Ret	3	3	Ret	Ret	Ret	11	Ret^{F}	WD	2	23	6th
1985	Tyrrell Racing	Tyrrell 014	EF4B 1.5 V6 t	G	(United Kingdom) Martin Brundle							Ret	7			7	8	13	Ret	7	NC	3	10th
1985	Tyrrell Racing	Tyrrell 014	EF4B 1.5 V6 t	G	(Germany) Stefan Bellof									8	7	Ret						3	10th
1985	Tyrrell Racing	Tyrrell 014	EF4B 1.5 V6 t	G	(Italy) Ivan Capelli														Ret		4	3	10th
1985	Tyrrell Racing	Tyrrell 014	EF4B 1.5 V6 t	G	(France) Philippe Streiff															Ret		3	10th
1986	John Player Special Team Lotus	Lotus 98T	EF15B 1.5 V6 t	G		BRA	ESP	SMR	MON	BEL	CAN	DET	FRA	GBR	GER	HUN	AUT	ITA	POR	MEX	AUS	58	3rd
1986	John Player Special Team Lotus	Lotus 98T	EF15B 1.5 V6 t	G	(Brazil) Ayrton Senna	2^{P}	1^{P}	Ret^{P}	3	2	5	1^{P}	Ret^{P}	Ret	2	2^{P}	Ret	Ret	4^{P}	3^{P}	Ret	58	3rd
1986	John Player Special Team Lotus	Lotus 98T	EF15B 1.5 V6 t	G	(United Kingdom) Johnny Dumfries	9	Ret	Ret	DNQ	Ret	Ret	7	Ret	7	Ret	5	Ret	Ret	9	Ret	6	58	3rd
1986	Équipe Ligier	Ligier JS27	EF4B 1.5 V6 t	P	(France) René Arnoux	4	Ret	Ret	5	Ret	6	Ret	5	4	4	Ret	10	Ret	7	15	7	29	5th
1986	Équipe Ligier	Ligier JS27	EF4B 1.5 V6 t	P	(France) Jacques Laffite	3	Ret	Ret	6	5	7	2	6	Ret								29	5th
1986	Équipe Ligier	Ligier JS27	EF4B 1.5 V6 t	P	(France) Philippe Alliot										Ret	9	Ret	Ret	Ret	6	8	29	5th
1986	Tyrrell Racing	Tyrrell 014; Tyrrell 015	EF4B 1.5 V6 t	G	(United Kingdom) Martin Brundle	5	Ret	8	Ret	Ret	9	Ret	10	5	Ret	6	Ret	10	Ret	11	4	11	7th
1986	Tyrrell Racing	Tyrrell 014; Tyrrell 015	EF4B 1.5 V6 t	G	(France) Philippe Streiff	7	Ret	Ret	11	12	11	9	Ret	6	Ret	8	Ret	9	Ret	Ret	5	11	7th

=== Williams, Ligier, Benetton (1989–2001) ===
(key)

Year	Entrant/s	Chassis	Engine(s)	Tyres	Drivers	1	2	3	4	5	6	7	8	9	10	11	12	13	14	15	16	17	Points	WCC
1989	Canon Williams Team	Williams FW12; Williams FW13	RS1 3.5 V10	G		BRA	SMR	MON	MEX	USA	CAN	FRA	GBR	GER	HUN	BEL	ITA	POR	ESP	JPN	AUS		77	2nd
1989	Canon Williams Team	Williams FW12; Williams FW13	RS1 3.5 V10	G	(Belgium) Thierry Boutsen	Ret	4	10	Ret	6	1	Ret	10	Ret	3	4	3	Ret	Ret	3	1		77	2nd
1989	Canon Williams Team	Williams FW12; Williams FW13	RS1 3.5 V10	G	(Italy) Riccardo Patrese	Ret^{F}	Ret	15	2	2	2	3	Ret	4	Ret^{P}	Ret	4	Ret	5	2	3		77	2nd
1990	Canon Williams Team	Williams FW13B	RS2 3.5 V10	G		USA	BRA	SMR	MON	CAN	MEX	FRA	GBR	GER	HUN	BEL	ITA	POR	ESP	JPN	AUS		57	4th
1990	Canon Williams Team	Williams FW13B	RS2 3.5 V10	G	(Belgium) Thierry Boutsen	3	5	Ret	4	Ret	5	Ret	2	6^{F}	1^{P}	Ret	Ret	Ret	4	5	5		57	4th
1990	Canon Williams Team	Williams FW13B	RS2 3.5 V10	G	(Italy) Riccardo Patrese	15	13	1	Ret	Ret	9	6	Ret	5	4^{F}	Ret	5	7^{F}	5^{F}	4^{F}	6		57	4th
1991	Canon Williams Team	Williams FW14	RS3 3.5 V10	G		USA	BRA	SMR	MON	CAN	MEX	FRA	GBR	GER	HUN	BEL	ITA	POR	ESP	JPN	AUS		125	2nd
1991	Canon Williams Team	Williams FW14	RS3 3.5 V10	G	(United Kingdom) Nigel Mansell	Ret	Ret^{F}	Ret	2	6^{F}	2^{F}	1^{F}	1^{P}^{F}	1^{P}	2	Ret	1	DSQ^{F}	1	Ret	2^{‡}		125	2nd
1991	Canon Williams Team	Williams FW14	RS3 3.5 V10	G	(Italy) Riccardo Patrese	Ret	2	Ret	Ret	3^{P}	1^{P}	5^{P}	Ret	2^{F}	3	5	Ret	1^{P}	3^{F}	3	5^{‡}		125	2nd
1992	Canon Williams Team	Williams FW14B	RS4 3.5 V10	G		RSA	MEX	BRA	ESP	SMR	MON	CAN	FRA	GBR	GER	HUN	BEL	ITA	POR	JPN	AUS		164	1st
1992	Canon Williams Team	Williams FW14B	RS4 3.5 V10	G	(United Kingdom) Nigel Mansell	1^{P}^{F}	1^{P}	1^{P}	1^{P}^{F}	1^{P}	2^{P}^{F}	Ret	1^{P}^{F}	1^{P}^{F}	1^{P}	2^{F}	2^{P}	Ret^{P}^{F}	1^{P}	Ret^{P}^{F}	Ret^{P}		164	1st
1992	Canon Williams Team	Williams FW14B	RS4 3.5 V10	G	(Italy) Riccardo Patrese	2	2	2^{F}	Ret	2^{F}	3	Ret	2	2	8^{F}	Ret^{P}	3	5	Ret	1	Ret		164	1st
1992	Ligier Gitanes Blondes	Ligier JS37	RS3C 3.5 V10	G	(Belgium) Thierry Boutsen	Ret	10	Ret	Ret	Ret	12	10	Ret	10	7	Ret	Ret	Ret	8	Ret	5		6	7th
1992	Ligier Gitanes Blondes	Ligier JS37	RS3C 3.5 V10	G	(France) Érik Comas	7	9	Ret	Ret	9	10	6	5	8	6	Ret	DNQ	Ret	Ret	Ret	Ret		6	7th
1993	Canon Williams Team	Williams FW15C	RS5 3.5 V10	G		RSA	BRA	EUR	SMR	ESP	MON	CAN	FRA	GBR	GER	HUN	BEL	ITA	POR	JPN	AUS		168	1st
1993	Canon Williams Team	Williams FW15C	RS5 3.5 V10	G	(United Kingdom) Damon Hill	Ret	2	2	Ret	Ret	2	3	2^{P}	Ret^{F}	15	1	1	1^{F}	3^{P}^{F}	4	3^{F}		168	1st
1993	Canon Williams Team	Williams FW15C	RS5 3.5 V10	G	(France) Alain Prost	1^{P}^{F}	Ret^{P}	3^{P}	1^{P}^{F}	1^{P}	4^{P}^{F}	1^{P}	1	1^{P}	1^{P}	12^{P}^{F}	3^{P}^{F}	12^{P}	2	2^{P}^{F}	2		168	1st
1993	Ligier Gitanes Blondes	Ligier JS39	RS5 3.5 V10	G	(United Kingdom) Martin Brundle	Ret	Ret	Ret	3	Ret	6	5	5	14	8	5	7	Ret	6	9	6		23	5th
1993	Ligier Gitanes Blondes	Ligier JS39	RS5 3.5 V10	G	(United Kingdom) Mark Blundell	3	5	Ret	Ret	7	Ret	Ret	Ret	7	3	7	11	Ret	Ret	7	9		23	5th
1994	Rothmans Williams Renault	Williams FW16	RS6 3.5 V10	G		BRA	PAC	SMR	MON	ESP	CAN	FRA	GBR	GER	HUN	BEL	ITA	POR	EUR	JPN	AUS		118	1st
1994	Rothmans Williams Renault	Williams FW16	RS6 3.5 V10	G	(United Kingdom) Damon Hill	2	Ret	6^{F}	Ret	1	2	2^{P}^{F}	1^{P}^{F}	8	2	1^{F}	1^{F}	1	2	1^{F}	Ret		118	1st
1994	Rothmans Williams Renault	Williams FW16	RS6 3.5 V10	G	(Brazil) Ayrton Senna	Ret^{P}	Ret^{P}	Ret^{P}															118	1st
1994	Rothmans Williams Renault	Williams FW16	RS6 3.5 V10	G	(United Kingdom) David Coulthard					Ret	5		5	Ret^{F}	Ret	4	6	2^{F}					118	1st
1994	Rothmans Williams Renault	Williams FW16	RS6 3.5 V10	G	(United Kingdom) Nigel Mansell							Ret							Ret	4	1^{P}		118	1st
1994	Ligier Gitanes Blondes	Ligier JS39B	RS6 3.5 V10	G	(France) Éric Bernard	Ret	10	12	Ret	8	13	Ret	13	3	10	10	7	10					13	6th
1994	Ligier Gitanes Blondes	Ligier JS39B	RS6 3.5 V10	G	(United Kingdom) Johnny Herbert														8				13	6th
1994	Ligier Gitanes Blondes	Ligier JS39B	RS6 3.5 V10	G	(France) Franck Lagorce															Ret	11		13	6th
1994	Ligier Gitanes Blondes	Ligier JS39B	RS6 3.5 V10	G	(France) Olivier Panis	11	9	11	9	7	12	Ret	12	2	6	7	10	DSQ	9	11	5		13	6th
1995	Mild Seven Benetton Renault	Benetton B195	RS7 3.0 V10	G		BRA	ARG	SMR	ESP	MON	CAN	FRA	GBR	GER	HUN	BEL	ITA	POR	EUR	PAC	JPN	AUS	137	1st
1995	Mild Seven Benetton Renault	Benetton B195	RS7 3.0 V10	G	(Germany) Michael Schumacher	1^{F}	3^{F}	Ret^{P}	1^{P}	1	5^{P}^{F}	1^{F}	Ret	1^{F}	11	1	Ret	2	1^{F}	1^{F}	1^{P}^{F}	Ret	137	1st
1995	Mild Seven Benetton Renault	Benetton B195	RS7 3.0 V10	G	(United Kingdom) Johnny Herbert	Ret	4	7	2	4	Ret	Ret	1	4	4	7	1	7	5	6	3	Ret	137	1st
1995	Rothmans Williams Renault	Williams FW17	RS7 3.0 V10	G	(United Kingdom) Damon Hill	Ret^{P}	1	1	4^{F}	2^{P}	Ret	2^{P}	Ret^{P}^{F}	Ret^{P}	1^{P}^{F}	2	Ret	3	Ret	3	Ret	1^{P}^{F}	118	2nd
1995	Rothmans Williams Renault	Williams FW17	RS7 3.0 V10	G	(United Kingdom) David Coulthard	2	Ret^{P}	4	Ret	Ret	Ret	3	3	2	2	Ret^{F}	Ret^{P}	1^{P}^{F}	3^{P}	2^{P}	Ret	Ret	118	2nd
1996	Rothmans Williams Renault	Williams FW18	RS8 3.0 V10	G		AUS	BRA	ARG	EUR	SMR	MON	ESP	CAN	FRA	GBR	GER	HUN	BEL	ITA	POR	JPN		175	1st
1996	Rothmans Williams Renault	Williams FW18	RS8 3.0 V10	G	(United Kingdom) Damon Hill	1	1^{P}^{F}	1^{P}	4^{P}^{F}	1^{F}	Ret	Ret^{P}	1^{P}	1	Ret^{P}	1^{P}^{F}	2^{F}	5	Ret^{P}	2^{P}	1		175	1st
1996	Rothmans Williams Renault	Williams FW18	RS8 3.0 V10	G	(Canada) Jacques Villeneuve	2^{P}^{F}	Ret	2	1	11	Ret	3	2^{F}	2^{F}	1^{F}	3	1	2^{P}	7	1^{F}	Ret^{P}^{F}		175	1st
1996	Mild Seven Benetton Renault	Benetton B196	RS8 3.0 V10	G	(France) Jean Alesi	Ret	2	3^{F}	Ret	6	Ret^{F}	2	3	3	Ret	2	3	4	2	4	Ret		68	3rd
1996	Mild Seven Benetton Renault	Benetton B196	RS8 3.0 V10	G	(Austria) Gerhard Berger	4	Ret	Ret	9	3	Ret	Ret	Ret	4	2	13	Ret	6^{F}	Ret	6	4		68	3rd
1997	Rothmans Williams Renault	Williams FW19	RS9 3.0 V10	G		AUS	BRA	ARG	SMR	MON	ESP	CAN	FRA	GBR	GER	HUN	BEL	ITA	AUT	LUX	JPN	EUR	123	1st
1997	Rothmans Williams Renault	Williams FW19	RS9 3.0 V10	G	(Canada) Jacques Villeneuve	Ret^{P}	1^{P}^{F}	1^{P}	Ret^{P}	Ret	1^{P}	Ret	4	1^{P}	Ret	1	5^{P}^{F}	5	1^{P}^{F}	1	DSQ^{P}	3^{P}	123	1st
1997	Rothmans Williams Renault	Williams FW19	RS9 3.0 V10	G	(Germany) Heinz-Harald Frentzen	8^{F}	9	Ret	1^{F}	Ret^{P}	8	4	2	Ret	Ret	Ret^{F}	3	3	3	3^{F}	2^{F}	6^{F}	123	1st
1997	Mild Seven Benetton Renault	Benetton B197	RS9 3.0 V10	G	(France) Jean Alesi	Ret	6	7	5	Ret	3	2	5	2	6	11	8	2^{P}	Ret	2	5	13	67	3rd
1997	Mild Seven Benetton Renault	Benetton B197	RS9 3.0 V10	G	(Austria) Gerhard Berger	4	2	6^{F}	Ret	9	10				1^{P}^{F}	8	6	7	10	4	8	4	67	3rd
1997	Mild Seven Benetton Renault	Benetton B197	RS9 3.0 V10	G	(Austria) Alexander Wurz							Ret	Ret	3									67	3rd
1998–2000: Renault did not participate in Formula One. Williams, Benetton, BAR and Arrows used rebranded Renault engines as Mechachrome, Playlife and Supertec respectively, meaning that the results are not the part of Renault engine statistics.
2001	Mild Seven Benetton Renault	Benetton B201	RS21 3.0 V10	MI		AUS	MAL	BRA	SMR	ESP	AUT	MON	CAN	EUR	FRA	GBR	GER	HUN	BEL	ITA	USA	JPN	10	7th
2001	Mild Seven Benetton Renault	Benetton B201	RS21 3.0 V10	MI	(Italy) Giancarlo Fisichella	13	Ret	6	Ret	14	Ret	Ret	Ret	11	11	13	4	Ret	3	10	8	17	10	7th
2001	Mild Seven Benetton Renault	Benetton B201	RS21 3.0 V10	MI	(United Kingdom) Jenson Button	14	11	10	12	15	Ret	7	Ret	13	16	15	5	Ret	Ret	Ret	9	7	10	7th
2002–2006: Renault did not supply engines to other teams.

=== Red Bull (2007–2010) ===
(key)

Year	Entrant/s	Chassis	Engine(s)	Tyres	Drivers	1	2	3	4	5	6	7	8	9	10	11	12	13	14	15	16	17	18	19	Points	WCC
2007	Red Bull Racing	Red Bull RB3	RS27 2.4 V8	B		AUS	MAL	BHR	ESP	MON	CAN	USA	FRA	GBR	EUR	HUN	TUR	ITA	BEL	JPN	CHN	BRA			24	5th
2007	Red Bull Racing	Red Bull RB3	RS27 2.4 V8	B	(United Kingdom) David Coulthard	Ret	Ret	Ret	5	14	Ret	Ret	13	11	5	11	10	Ret	Ret	4	8	9			24	5th
2007	Red Bull Racing	Red Bull RB3	RS27 2.4 V8	B	(Australia) Mark Webber	13	10	Ret	Ret	Ret	9	7	12	Ret	3	9	Ret	9	7	Ret	10	Ret			24	5th
2008	Red Bull Racing	Red Bull RB4	RS27 2.4 V8	B		AUS	MAL	BHR	ESP	TUR	MON	CAN	FRA	GBR	GER	HUN	EUR	BEL	ITA	SIN	JPN	CHN	BRA		29	7th
2008	Red Bull Racing	Red Bull RB4	RS27 2.4 V8	B	(United Kingdom) David Coulthard	Ret	9	18	12	9	Ret	3	9	Ret	13	14	17	11	16	7	Ret	10	Ret		29	7th
2008	Red Bull Racing	Red Bull RB4	RS27 2.4 V8	B	(Australia) Mark Webber	Ret	7	7	5	7	4	12	6	10	Ret	9	12	8	8	Ret	8	14	9		29	7th
2009	Red Bull Racing	Red Bull RB5	RS27 2.4 V8	B		AUS	MAL	CHN	BHR	ESP	MON	TUR	GBR	GER	HUN	EUR	BEL	ITA	SIN	JPN	BRA	ABU			153.5	2nd
2009	Red Bull Racing	Red Bull RB5	RS27 2.4 V8	B	(Australia) Mark Webber	12	6^{‡}	2	11	3	5	2	2	1^{P}	3^{F}	9	9	Ret	Ret	17^{F}	1^{F}	2			153.5	2nd
2009	Red Bull Racing	Red Bull RB5	RS27 2.4 V8	B	(Germany) Sebastian Vettel	13	15	1^{P}	2	4	Ret	3^{P}	1^{P}^{F}	2	Ret	Ret	3^{F}	8	4	1^{P}	4	1^{F}			153.5	2nd
2010	Red Bull Racing	Red Bull RB6	RS27-2010 2.4 V8	B		BHR	AUS	MAL	CHN	ESP	MON	TUR	CAN	EUR	GBR	GER	HUN	BEL	ITA	SIN	JPN	KOR	BRA	ABU	498	1st
2010	Red Bull Racing	Red Bull RB6	RS27-2010 2.4 V8	B	(Germany) Sebastian Vettel	4^{P}	Ret^{P}	1	6^{P}	3	2^{F}	Ret	4	1^{P}	7^{P}	3^{P}^{F}	3^{P}^{F}	15	4	2	1^{P}	Ret^{P}	1	1^{P}	498	1st
2010	Red Bull Racing	Red Bull RB6	RS27-2010 2.4 V8	B	(Australia) Mark Webber	8	9^{F}	2^{P}^{F}	8	1^{P}	1^{P}	3^{P}	5	Ret	1	6	1	2^{P}	6	3	2^{F}	Ret	2	8	498	1st

=== Red Bull, Team Lotus, Lotus F1, Caterham, Williams, Toro Rosso (2011–2015) ===
(key)

Year	Entrant/s	Chassis	Engine(s)	Tyres	Drivers	1	2	3	4	5	6	7	8	9	10	11	12	13	14	15	16	17	18	19	20	Points	WCC
2011	Red Bull Racing	Red Bull RB7	RS27-2011 2.4 V8	P		AUS	MAL	CHN	TUR	ESP	MON	CAN	EUR	GBR	GER	HUN	BEL	ITA	SIN	JPN	KOR	IND	ABU	BRA		650	1st
2011	Red Bull Racing	Red Bull RB7	RS27-2011 2.4 V8	P	(Germany) Sebastian Vettel	1^{P}	1^{P}	2^{P}	1^{P}	1	1^{P}	2^{P}	1^{P}^{F}	2	4	2^{P}	1^{P}	1^{P}	1^{P}	3^{P}	1^{F}	1^{P}^{F}	Ret^{P}	2^{P}		650	1st
2011	Red Bull Racing	Red Bull RB7	RS27-2011 2.4 V8	P	(Australia) Mark Webber	5	4^{F}	3^{F}	2^{F}	4^{P}	4^{F}	3	3	3^{P}	3^{P}	5	2^{F}	Ret	3	4	3	4	4^{F}	1^{F}		650	1st
2011	Team Lotus	Lotus T128	RS27-2011 2.4 V8	P	(Finland) Heikki Kovalainen	Ret	15	16	19	Ret	14	Ret	19	Ret	16	Ret	15	13	16	18	14	14	17	16		0	10th
2011	Team Lotus	Lotus T128	RS27-2011 2.4 V8	P	(Italy) Jarno Trulli	13	Ret	19	18	18	13	16	20	Ret	20	Ret	14	14	Ret	19	17	19	18	18		0	10th
2012	Red Bull Racing	Red Bull RB8	RS27-2012 2.4 V8	P		AUS	MAL	CHN	BHR	ESP	MON	CAN	EUR	GBR	GER	HUN	BEL	ITA	SIN	JPN	KOR	IND	ABU	USA	BRA	460	1st
2012	Red Bull Racing	Red Bull RB8	RS27-2012 2.4 V8	P	(Germany) Sebastian Vettel	2	11	5	1^{P}^{F}	6	4	4^{P}^{F}	Ret^{P}	3	5	4^{F}	2	22	1	1^{P}^{F}	1	1^{P}	3^{F}	2^{P}^{F}	6	460	1st
2012	Red Bull Racing	Red Bull RB8	RS27-2012 2.4 V8	P	(Australia) Mark Webber	4	4	4	4	11	1^{P}	7	4	1	8	8	6	20	11	9	2^{P}^{F}	3	Ret	Ret	4	460	1st
2012	Lotus F1 Team	Lotus E20	RS27-2012 2.4 V8	P	(Finland) Kimi Räikkönen	7	5^{F}	14	2	3	9	8	2	5^{F}	3	2	3	5	6	6	5	7	1	6	10	303	4th
2012	Lotus F1 Team	Lotus E20	RS27-2012 2.4 V8	P	(France) Romain Grosjean	Ret	Ret	6	3	4^{F}	Ret	2	Ret	6	18	3	Ret		7	19	7	9	Ret	7	Ret	303	4th
2012	Lotus F1 Team	Lotus E20	RS27-2012 2.4 V8	P	(Belgium) Jérôme d'Ambrosio													13								303	4th
2012	Williams F1 Team	Williams FW34	RS27-2012 2.4 V8	P	(Venezuela) Pastor Maldonado	13	19	8	Ret	1^{P}	Ret	13	12	16	15	13	Ret	11	Ret	8	14	16	5	9	Ret	76	8th
2012	Williams F1 Team	Williams FW34	RS27-2012 2.4 V8	P	(Brazil) Bruno Senna	16	6	7	22	Ret	10	17	10	9	17	7	12^{F}	10	18	14	15	10	8	10	Ret	76	8th
2012	Caterham F1 Team	Caterham CT01	RS27-2012 2.4 V8	P	(Finland) Heikki Kovalainen	Ret	18	23	17	16	13	18	14	17	19	17	17	14	15	15	17	18	13	18	14	0	10th
2012	Caterham F1 Team	Caterham CT01	RS27-2012 2.4 V8	P	(Russia) Vitaly Petrov	Ret	16	18	16	17	Ret	19	13	DNS	16	19	14	15	19	17	16	17	16	17	11	0	10th
2013	Infiniti Red Bull Racing	Red Bull RB9	RS27-2013 2.4 V8	P		AUS	MAL	CHN	BHR	ESP	MON	CAN	GBR	GER	HUN	BEL	ITA	SIN	KOR	JPN	IND	ABU	USA	BRA		596	1st
2013	Infiniti Red Bull Racing	Red Bull RB9	RS27-2013 2.4 V8	P	(Germany) Sebastian Vettel	3^{P}	1^{P}	4^{F}	1^{F}	4	2^{F}	1^{P}	Ret	1	3	1^{F}	1^{P}	1^{P}^{F}	1^{P}^{F}	1	1^{P}	1	1^{P}^{F}	1^{P}		596	1st
2013	Infiniti Red Bull Racing	Red Bull RB9	RS27-2013 2.4 V8	P	(Australia) Mark Webber	6	2	Ret	7	5	3	4^{F}	2^{F}	7	4^{F}	5	3	15^{†}	Ret	2^{P}^{F}	Ret	2^{P}	3	2^{F}		596	1st
2013	Lotus F1 Team	Lotus E21	RS27-2013 2.4 V8	P	(Finland) Kimi Räikkönen	1^{F}	7	2	2	2	10	9	5	2	2	Ret	11	3	2	5	7^{F}	Ret				315	4th
2013	Lotus F1 Team	Lotus E21	RS27-2013 2.4 V8	P	(Finland) Heikki Kovalainen																		14	14		315	4th
2013	Lotus F1 Team	Lotus E21	RS27-2013 2.4 V8	P	(France) Romain Grosjean	10	6	9	3	Ret	Ret	13	19^{†}	3	6	8	8	Ret	3	3	3	4	2	Ret		315	4th
2013	Williams F1 Team	Williams FW35	RS27-2013 2.4 V8	P	(Venezuela) Pastor Maldonado	Ret	Ret	14	11	14	Ret	16	11	15	10	17	14	11	13	16	12	11	17	16		5	9th
2013	Williams F1 Team	Williams FW35	RS27-2013 2.4 V8	P	(Finland) Valtteri Bottas	14	11	13	14	16	12	14	12	16	Ret	15	15	13	12	17	16	15	8	Ret		5	9th
2013	Caterham F1 Team	Caterham CT03	RS27-2013 2.4 V8	P	(France) Charles Pic	16	14	16	17	17	Ret	18	15	17	15	Ret	17	19	14	18	Ret	19	20	Ret		0	11th
2013	Caterham F1 Team	Caterham CT03	RS27-2013 2.4 V8	P	(Netherlands) Giedo van der Garde	18	15	18	21	Ret	15	Ret	18	18	14	16	18	16	15	Ret	Ret	18	19	18		0	11th
2014	Infiniti Red Bull Racing	Red Bull RB10	Energy F1-2014 1.6 V6 t	P		AUS	MAL	BHR	CHN	ESP	MON	CAN	AUT	GBR	GER	HUN	BEL	ITA	SIN	JPN	RUS	USA	BRA	ABU		405	2nd
2014	Infiniti Red Bull Racing	Red Bull RB10	Energy F1-2014 1.6 V6 t	P	(Germany) Sebastian Vettel	Ret	3	6	5	4^{F}	Ret	3	Ret	5	4	7	5	6	2	3	8	7^{F}	5	8		405	2nd
2014	Infiniti Red Bull Racing	Red Bull RB10	Energy F1-2014 1.6 V6 t	P	(Australia) Daniel Ricciardo	DSQ	Ret	4	4	3	3	1	8	3	6	1	1	5	3	4	7	3	Ret	4^{F}		405	2nd
2014	Scuderia Toro Rosso	Toro Rosso STR9	Energy F1-2014 1.6 V6 t	P	(France) Jean-Éric Vergne	8	Ret	Ret	12	Ret	Ret	8	Ret	10	13	9	11	13	6	9	13	10	13	12		30	7th
2014	Scuderia Toro Rosso	Toro Rosso STR9	Energy F1-2014 1.6 V6 t	P	(Russia) Daniil Kvyat	9	10	11	10	14	Ret	Ret	Ret	9	Ret	14	9	11	14	11	14	15	11	Ret		30	7th
2014	Lotus F1 Team	Lotus E22	Energy F1-2014 1.6 V6 t	P	(France) Romain Grosjean	Ret	11	12	Ret	8	8	Ret	14	12	Ret	Ret	Ret	16	13	15	17	11	17^{†}	13		10	8th
2014	Lotus F1 Team	Lotus E22	Energy F1-2014 1.6 V6 t	P	(Venezuela) Pastor Maldonado	Ret	Ret	14	14	15	DNS	Ret	12	17^{†}	12	13	Ret	14	12	16	18	9	12	Ret		10	8th
2014	Caterham F1 Team	Caterham CT05	Energy F1-2014 1.6 V6 t	P	(Sweden) Marcus Ericsson	Ret	14	Ret	20	20	11	Ret	18	Ret	18	Ret	17	19	15	17	19					0	11th
2014	Caterham F1 Team	Caterham CT05	Energy F1-2014 1.6 V6 t	P	(Japan) Kamui Kobayashi	Ret	13	15	18	Ret	13	Ret	16	15	16	Ret		17	DNS	19	Ret			Ret		0	11th
2014	Caterham F1 Team	Caterham CT05	Energy F1-2014 1.6 V6 t	P	(Germany) André Lotterer												Ret									0	11th
2014	Caterham F1 Team	Caterham CT05	Energy F1-2014 1.6 V6 t	P	(United Kingdom) Will Stevens																			17		0	11th
2015	Infiniti Red Bull Racing	Red Bull RB11	Energy F1-2015 1.6 V6 t	P		AUS	MAL	CHN	BHR	ESP	MON	CAN	AUT	GBR	HUN	BEL	ITA	SIN	JPN	RUS	USA	MEX	BRA	ABU		187	4th
2015	Infiniti Red Bull Racing	Red Bull RB11	Energy F1-2015 1.6 V6 t	P	(Australia) Daniel Ricciardo	6	10	9	6	7	5^{F}	13	10	Ret	3^{F}	Ret	8	2^{F}	15	15^{†}	10	5	11	6		187	4th
2015	Infiniti Red Bull Racing	Red Bull RB11	Energy F1-2015 1.6 V6 t	P	(Russia) Daniil Kvyat	DNS	9	Ret	9	10	4	9	12	6	2	4	10	6	13	5	Ret	4	7	10		187	4th
2015	Scuderia Toro Rosso	Toro Rosso STR10	Energy F1-2015 1.6 V6 t	P	(Netherlands) Max Verstappen	Ret	7	17^{†}	Ret	11	Ret	15	8	Ret	4	8	12	8	9	10	4	9	9	16		67	7th
2015	Scuderia Toro Rosso	Toro Rosso STR10	Energy F1-2015 1.6 V6 t	P	(Spain) Carlos Sainz Jr.	9	8	13	Ret	9	10	12	Ret	Ret	Ret	Ret	11	9	10	Ret	7	13	Ret	11		67	7th
2016–2017: Renault did not supply Renault-badged engines to other teams. Red Bull and Toro Rosso branded Renault engines as TAG Heuer and Toro Rosso respectively, meaning that the 2016–2017 results are not the part of Renault engine statistics.

=== McLaren (2018–2020) ===
(key)

Year	Entrant/s	Chassis	Engine(s)	Tyres	Drivers	1	2	3	4	5	6	7	8	9	10	11	12	13	14	15	16	17	18	19	20	21	Points	WCC
2018	McLaren F1 Team	McLaren MCL33	R.E.18 1.6 V6 t	P		AUS	BHR	CHN	AZE	ESP	MON	CAN	FRA	AUT	GBR	GER	HUN	BEL	ITA	SIN	RUS	JPN	USA	MEX	BRA	ABU	62	6th
2018	McLaren F1 Team	McLaren MCL33	R.E.18 1.6 V6 t	P	(Belgium) Stoffel Vandoorne	9	8	13	9	Ret	14	16	12	15^{†}	11	13	Ret	15	12	12	16	15	11	8	15	14	62	6th
2018	McLaren F1 Team	McLaren MCL33	R.E.18 1.6 V6 t	P	(Spain) Fernando Alonso	5	7	7	7	8	Ret	Ret	16^{†}	8	8	16^{†}	8	Ret	Ret	7	14	14	Ret	Ret	17	11	62	6th
2019	McLaren F1 Team	McLaren MCL34	E-Tech 19 1.6 V6 t	P		AUS	BHR	CHN	AZE	ESP	MON	CAN	FRA	AUT	GBR	GER	HUN	BEL	ITA	SIN	RUS	JPN	MEX	USA	BRA	ABU	145	4th
2019	McLaren F1 Team	McLaren MCL34	E-Tech 19 1.6 V6 t	P	(United Kingdom) Lando Norris	12	6	18^{†}	8	Ret	11	Ret	9	6	11	Ret	9	11^{†}	10	7	8	11	Ret	7	8	8	145	4th
2019	McLaren F1 Team	McLaren MCL34	E-Tech 19 1.6 V6 t	P	(Spain) Carlos Sainz Jr.	Ret	19^{†}	14	7	8	6	11	6	8	6	5	5	Ret	Ret	12	6	5	13	8	3	10	145	4th
2020	McLaren F1 Team	McLaren MCL35	E-Tech 20 1.6 V6 t	P		AUT	STY	HUN	GBR	70A	ESP	BEL	ITA	TUS	RUS	EIF	POR	EMI	TUR	BHR	SKH	ABU					202	3rd
2020	McLaren F1 Team	McLaren MCL35	E-Tech 20 1.6 V6 t	P	(United Kingdom) Lando Norris	3^{F}	5	13	5	9	10	7	4	6	15	Ret	13	8	8^{F}	4	10	5					202	3rd
2020	McLaren F1 Team	McLaren MCL35	E-Tech 20 1.6 V6 t	P	(Spain) Carlos Sainz Jr.	5	9^{F}	9	13	13	6	DNS	2	Ret	Ret	5	6	7	5	5	4	6					202	3rd

=== Alpine (2021–2025) ===
(key)

Year	Entrant/s	Chassis	Engine(s)	Tyres	Drivers	1	2	3	4	5	6	7	8	9	10	11	12	13	14	15	16	17	18	19	20	21	22	23	24	Points	WCC
2021	Alpine F1 Team	Alpine A521	E-Tech 20B 1.6 V6 t	P		BHR	EMI	POR	ESP	MON	AZE	FRA	STY	AUT	GBR	HUN	BEL	NED	ITA	RUS	TUR	USA	MXC	SAP	QAT	SAU	ABU			155	5th
2021	Alpine F1 Team	Alpine A521	E-Tech 20B 1.6 V6 t	P	(Spain) Fernando Alonso	Ret	10	8	17	13	6	8	9	10	7	4	11	6	8	6	16	Ret	9	9	3	13	8			155	5th
2021	Alpine F1 Team	Alpine A521	E-Tech 20B 1.6 V6 t	P	(France) Esteban Ocon	13	9	7	9	9	Ret	14	14	Ret	9	1	7^{‡}	9	10	14	10	Ret	13	8	5	4	9			155	5th
2022	BWT Alpine F1 Team	Alpine A522	E-Tech RE22 1.6 V6 t	P		BHR	SAU	AUS	EMI	MIA	ESP	MON	AZE	CAN	GBR	AUT	FRA	HUN	BEL	NED	ITA	SIN	JPN	USA	MXC	SAP	ABU			173	4th
2022	BWT Alpine F1 Team	Alpine A522	E-Tech RE22 1.6 V6 t	P	(Spain) Fernando Alonso	9	Ret	17	Ret	11	9	7	7	9	5	10	6	8	5	6	Ret	Ret	7	7	19†	5	Ret			173	4th
2022	BWT Alpine F1 Team	Alpine A522	E-Tech RE22 1.6 V6 t	P	(France) Esteban Ocon	7	6	7	14	8	7	12	10	6	Ret	5^{6}	8	9	7	9	11	Ret	4	11	8	8	7			173	4th
2023	BWT Alpine F1 Team	Alpine A523	E-Tech RE23 1.6 V6 t	P		BHR	SAU	AUS	AZE	MIA	MON	ESP	CAN	AUT	GBR	HUN	BEL	NED	ITA	SIN	JPN	QAT	USA	MXC	SAP	LVG	ABU			120	6th
2023	BWT Alpine F1 Team	Alpine A523	E-Tech RE23 1.6 V6 t	P	(France) Pierre Gasly	9	9	13†	14	8	7	10	12	10	18†	Ret	11^{3}	3	15	6	10	12	6^{7}	11	7	11	13			120	6th
2023	BWT Alpine F1 Team	Alpine A523	E-Tech RE23 1.6 V6 t	P	(France) Esteban Ocon	Ret	8	14†	15	9	3	8	8	14^{7}	Ret	Ret	8	10	Ret	Ret	9	7	Ret	10	10	4	12			120	6th
2024	BWT Alpine F1 Team	Alpine A524	E-Tech RE24 1.6 V6 t	P		BHR	SAU	AUS	JPN	CHN	MIA	EMI	MON	CAN	ESP	AUT	GBR	HUN	BEL	NED	ITA	AZE	SIN	USA	MXC	SAP	LVG	QAT	ABU	65	6th
2024	BWT Alpine F1 Team	Alpine A524	E-Tech RE24 1.6 V6 t	P	(France) Pierre Gasly	18	Ret	13	16	13	12	16	10	9	9	10	DNS	Ret	13	9	15	12	17	12	10	3^{7}	Ret	5	7	65	6th
2024	BWT Alpine F1 Team	Alpine A524	E-Tech RE24 1.6 V6 t	P	(France) Esteban Ocon	17	13	16	15	11	10	14	Ret	10	10	12	16	18	9	15	14	15	13	18^{F}	13	2	17	Ret		65	6th
2024	BWT Alpine F1 Team	Alpine A524	E-Tech RE24 1.6 V6 t	P	(Australia) Jack Doohan																								15	65	6th
2025	BWT Alpine F1 Team	Alpine A525	E-Tech RE25 1.6 V6 t	P		AUS	CHN	JPN	BHR	SAU	MIA	EMI	MON	ESP	CAN	AUT	GBR	BEL	HUN	NED	ITA	AZE	SIN	USA	MXC	SAP	LVG	QAT	ABU	22	10th
2025	BWT Alpine F1 Team	Alpine A525	E-Tech RE25 1.6 V6 t	P	(Australia) Jack Doohan	Ret	13	15	14	17	Ret																			22	10th
2025	BWT Alpine F1 Team	Alpine A525	E-Tech RE25 1.6 V6 t	P	(Argentina) Franco Colapinto							16	13	15	13	15	DNS	19	18	11	17	19	16	17	16	15	15	14	20	22	10th
2025	BWT Alpine F1 Team	Alpine A525	E-Tech RE25 1.6 V6 t	P	(France) Pierre Gasly	11	DSQ	13	7	Ret	13^{8}	13	Ret	8	15	13	6	10	19	17	16	18	19	19	15	10^{8}	13	16	19	22	10th

Notes

- ^{†} – The driver did not finish the Grand Prix, but was classified, as he completed over 90% of the race distance.
- ^{‡} – Half points awarded as less than 75% of the race distance was completed.
