= Williams FW12 =

Formula One racing car

Williams FW12 Williams FW12C
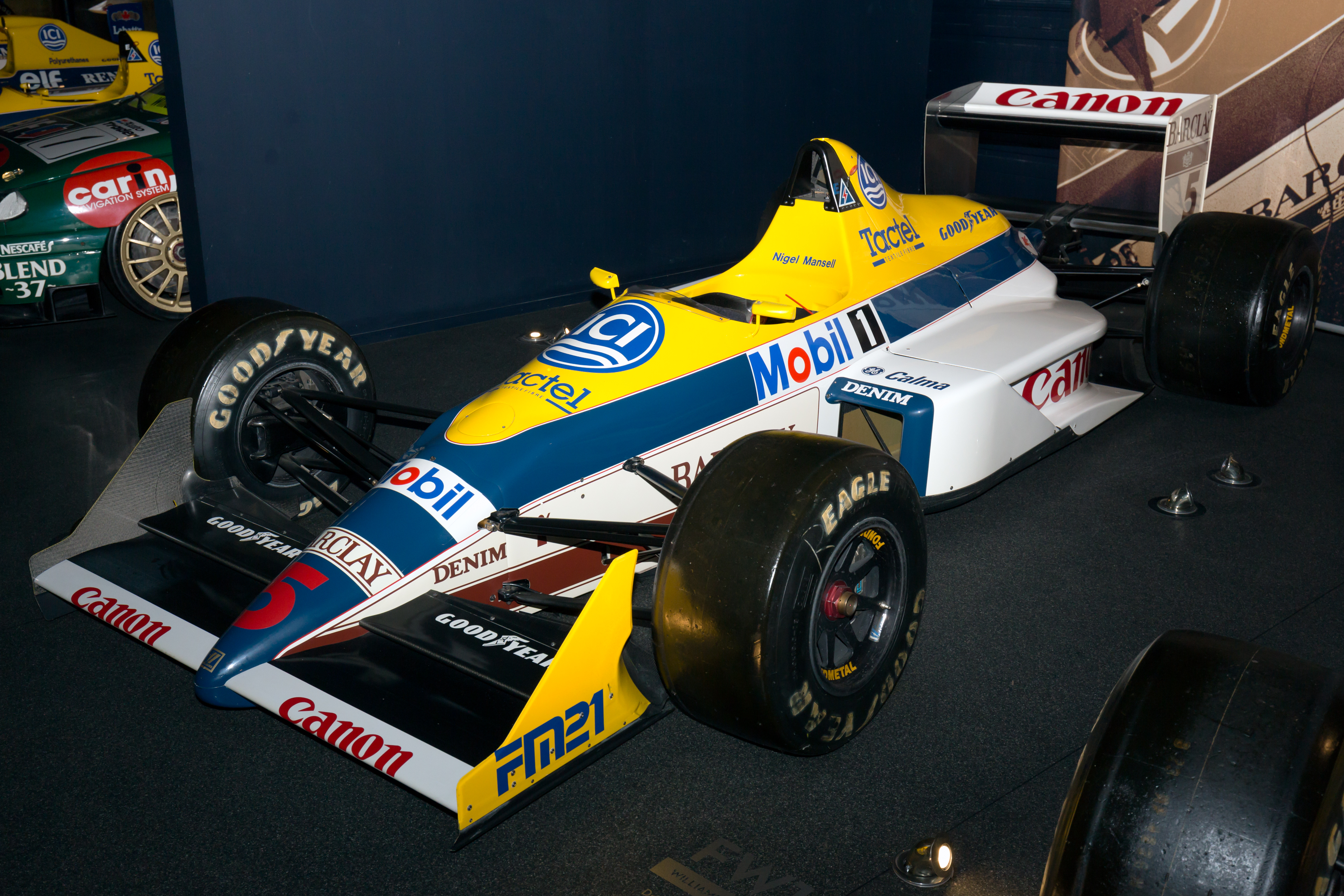
- Nigel Mansell's 1988 Williams FW12
- Category: Formula One
- Constructor: Williams (chassis); Renault Sport (engine) (FW12C)
- Designers: Patrick Head (Technical Director); Frank Dernie (Chief Designer (FW12)); Enrique Scalabroni (Chief Designer (FW12C)); Bernard Dudot (Chief Engine Designer (Renault) (FW12C))
- Predecessor: FW11B
- Successor: FW13

Technical specifications
- Chassis: Carbon fibre and honeycomb composite monocoque
- Suspension (front): 1988: Active suspension 1988 / 1989: Double wishbones, pullrods
- Suspension (rear): 1988: Active suspension 1988 / 1989: Double wishbones, pullrods
- Axle track: 1988: Front: 1,803 mm (71.0 in); Rear: 1,676 mm (66.0 in); 1989: Front: 1,803 mm (71.0 in); Rear: 1,600 mm (63 in)
- Wheelbase: 1988: 2,743 mm (108.0 in); 1989: 2,997 mm (118.0 in)
- Engine: 1988: mid-engine, longitudinally mounted, 3,496 cc (213.3 cu in), Judd CV, 76° V8, NA. 1989: mid-engine, longitudinally-mounted, 3,493 cc (213.2 cu in), Renault RS1, 67° V10, NA.
- Transmission: Williams / Hewland 6 speed manual
- Power: 600 hp @ 11,200 rpm (Judd V8), 650 hp @ 12,500 rpm (Renault V10)
- Weight: 500 kg (1,100 lb)
- Fuel: 1988: Mobil; 1989: Elf
- Tyres: Goodyear

Competition history
- Notable entrants: Canon Williams Team
- Notable drivers: 5. (United Kingdom) Nigel Mansell; 5. (United Kingdom) Martin Brundle; 5. (France) Jean-Louis Schlesser; 5. (Belgium) Thierry Boutsen; 6. (Italy) Riccardo Patrese
- Debut: 1988 Brazilian Grand Prix
- First win: 1989 Canadian Grand Prix
- Last win: 1989 Canadian Grand Prix
- Last event: 1989 Spanish Grand Prix
Races	Wins	Poles	F/Laps
29	1	1	2
- Constructors' Championships: 0
- Drivers' Championships: 0

The Williams FW12 was a Formula One racing car used by the Williams team for the 1988 season. An updated version, the FW12C, was used for 12 of the 16 races of the 1989 season. The FW12 was Williams's first naturally aspirated car since the FW08 and FW08C used in the 1982 and 1983 season.

== FW12 ==
In its original guise the FW12 featured a Judd CV 3.5 V8. In 1988 the car was unsuccessful for Williams after two years of domination with the FW12's predecessor, the FW11 and FW11B, through use of the V6 Honda turbo engine. Williams had an existing contract to continue using the Honda engines in 1988. However, the team's refusal to remove Nigel Mansell and replace him with Honda's test driver Satoru Nakajima for the 1986 season, as well as Honda being reportedly unhappy with Williams management for allegedly not honouring the number one driver status of Nelson Piquet's contract, which contributed to both Piquet and Mansell losing the 1986 Drivers' Championship to McLaren's Alain Prost and Mansell almost beating Piquet to the 1987 title, saw the relationship between Honda and the team sour and the Japanese manufacturer pull out of the contract and instead, announcing at the 1987 Hungarian Grand Prix a three-year deal to supply their engines to McLaren from 1988.

Early in the season the FW12 was described by both Nigel Mansell and Riccardo Patrese as being "pathetically slow in a straight line" and speed trap figures backed up their claims. In qualifying for the opening race of the season in Brazil, despite Mansell qualifying a surprising second on the grid, the FW12 was only timed at 265 km/h (165 mph) on the Jacarepaguá circuits 900 metre long back straight. This compared to the over 290 km/h (180 mph) recorded by McLaren and Lotus with their Honda turbo engines. That speed deficit, along with trouble from the computer controlled Reactive Ride suspension system, saw only one point scored before the mid-season British Grand Prix, when Riccardo Patrese finished 6th in Monaco. For his part, Mansell—who had won 11 races though 1986 and 1987, more than any other driver—failed to finish the first seven races of the 1988 season, a situation which would end up seeing Mansell leave Williams at the end of the year to join Ferrari.

Williams had debuted their own version of the computer controlled "active suspension" on the FW11 at the 1987 Italian Grand Prix, with Nelson Piquet taking victory in the system's debut (it was called "Williams Reactive Ride" by the team as Lotus had the copyright on the "Active Suspension" name in F1). Williams made revisions to the system in the off-season, deciding to use it on the FW12 with the hope it would be an advantage over the other non-turbo cars and put it on a more equal footing with the more powerful turbo-powered teams. However, the revisions ended up having a detrimental effect, something that was masked by it actually working OK in the first race in Rio with observers of Mansell's "high downforce" qualifying lap saying that his FW12 looked easily the most stable car on the track. The main problem encountered by the team was that air was somehow getting into the hydraulics and disturbing the computerised settings making the FW12's handling unpredictable, with both Mansell and Patrese pointing out on numerous occasions that the suspension settings were not only changing from lap to lap, but sometimes from corner to corner. Additionally, the onboard computer which was needed to run the system not only added weight to the car (approximately 25 kg (55 lb)), but also drew power from the car's engine to run properly (approximately 5%). This was acceptable when the team started using the system as they had the use of Honda's 1,000 bhp (746 kW; 1,014 PS) V6 turbo. In 1988 though the Judd V8, in its first year of F1 competition, was only developing some 600 bhp (447 kW; 608 PS), which resulted in the car being sluggish, and accounted for its lack of straight line speed.

It was at Silverstone for the British Grand Prix that Williams Technical Director Patrick Head decided to replace the reactive suspension system for a more conventional one. This was a process that Head had previously stated could not be done without a great deal of development and work, but at the team's home Grand Prix, a race it had won the previous two years, the situation was desperate as Mansell had finished the first qualifying session 13th while Patrese was 30th and last, some 14 seconds slower than the final starting position of 26th. Overnight after Friday qualifying the team worked to convert the cars. While Head admitted it was a "bodge job done on the fly" and would have to be re-worked later, both Mansell and Patrese expressed delight with the car, Mansell improved his times by 1.3 seconds to qualify 11th while Patrese improved by 17.864 seconds to jump from 30th to 15th. The race was also a boost for Williams as Mansell drove his car in heavy rain to second place, his first points of the season, setting fastest lap along the way (one of only two non-turbo fastest laps of the season).

It's a bodge frankly. We've put steel mechanical springs and dampers on. We've changed the front struts into dampers, designed some new bits and pieces which we machined up overnight. We did some new pistons for the front struts... it's a bit of a bodge as I said.

— Patrick Head talking about the overnight changes to the FW12 in an interview on the morning of the British Grand Prix.

Mansell was forced to miss the Belgian and Italian races because of chickenpox and was substituted by Martin Brundle and Jean-Louis Schlesser consecutively. Brundle had previously driven F1 for Tyrrell and Zakspeed from 1984 to 1987. Schlesser drove in what would be the only World Championship F1 race of his career. He had previously driven a RAM-Ford to 6th in the non-championship 1983 Race of Champions, then unsuccessfully tried to qualify the car a week later for the French Grand Prix and had not driven an F1 car since.

Despite a long and successful career in motor racing (2 time Dakar Rally winner and was a two time World Sportscar Champion), Schlesser will be remembered for his drive at Monza, because of his clash on lap 49 of 51 with race leader Ayrton Senna in the McLaren-Honda at the Variante de Rettifilio chicane which subsequently took Ayrton Senna out of the race. This was McLaren's only loss of the season, and handed Ferrari's Gerhard Berger and Michele Alboreto finishing the race with a 1-2 result only a month after the death of Enzo Ferrari.

The FW12 proved competitive for Williams in the last few races of the 1988 season. Despite both Mansell and Patrese retiring from the Portuguese Grand Prix (Round 13), better was to come at the next race in Spain with Mansell finishing 2nd behind the McLaren of Alain Prost, while Patrese finished 5th after being fined US$10,000 for brake-checking the Tyrrell of Julian Bailey during qualifying (the race was also Mansell's second and only point scoring race for the season after finishing runner up in both 1986 and 1987). Mansell was then to retire from the last two races of the season in both Japan (accident with the Lotus of Nelson Piquet) and Australia (brake failure), ending his first run with the team after four seasons and 13 wins, while Patrese would finish sixth and fourth in both races.

After winning the Formula One Constructors' Championships in both 1986 and 1987 and the Drivers' Championship with Piquet in 1987, Williams dropped to seventh in the standings in 1988, scoring only 20 points for the season in a year when the Honda powered McLaren MP4/4's of 1988 World Champion Ayrton Senna and his teammate, dual World Champion Alain Prost, won 15 of the season's 16 races in the single most dominant season in Formula One history at the time.

== FW12C ==
During the 1988 season, Williams worked with their new engine supplier Renault to develop the RS1 3.5 V10 engine. Williams designed a test mule for the engine named FW12B, very much like the Judd-powered car Williams used for the 1988 season except the mule was designed to accommodate the extra length of a V10 engine and not a V8 like the race cars used. For the 1989 season the Renault V10 engine was used. This was the first Renault powered Williams F1 car and also saw Renault's re-entry into Formula One after stopping the supply of their turbocharged engines following the 1986 season. The Renault engine was designed under the direction of longtime Renault Sport engineer Bernard Dudot; the design and development of Renault's V10 started at least a year after Honda began developing their V10 engine largely due to Renault's short-lived withdrawal from F1 as an engine supplier at the end of the 1986 season. The updated and revised FW12C showed its potential in the season opening Brazilian Grand Prix with Patrese qualifying 2nd and leading the race from the start in what was his 176th Grand Prix start, which equalled the then record held jointly by dual World Champion Graham Hill and former Williams driver Jacques Laffite. Patrese also set the fastest lap of the race before retiring in front of the pits with a broken harmonic balancer.

During this time the car scored its only win when Thierry Boutsen (who had replaced Mansell in the team) scored his first win at the rain affected Canadian Grand Prix, and with Patrese finishing second it was Williams's first 1–2 result since the 1987 Mexican Grand Prix. Patrese, who had his best season to date after consecutive 2nd-place finishes in Mexico, Phoenix and Canada, followed by a 3rd in France, also scored the car's only pole position at the Hungarian Grand Prix. Patrese comfortably led the Hungarian GP from the start, easily holding off reigning World Champion Ayrton Senna's V10 McLaren-Honda on the tight and twisty circuit known as "Monaco without houses" until lap 51 when a hole in the radiator caused the car to overheat and lose power allowing Senna past on the short front straight. Eventual race winner Mansell in the Ferrari was also past a couple of corners later, and by the beginning of lap 55 Patrese had fallen to 5th when he pulled off at the end of the pit exit with a dead engine. Boutsen after a steady drive in which he never challenged the leading group, would ultimately finish in 3rd place.

By the time of the Italian Grand Prix at Monza, it had become obvious that while the Renault V10 was continuing to get better and better, the limit of the FW12C itself had been reached, with the team starting to fall behind both McLaren, with their Honda V10 engine, and Ferrari with their V12, while also being consistently challenged by Benetton which had the lightest and most fuel efficient of the top running engines, the Cosworth built and developed Ford V8 of which they had exclusive use. Williams, who had decided to continue with the FW12C, preferring to get its successor, the FW13, right before making its race debut, decided after Italy, where Boutsen finished 3rd with Patrese 4th (largely because both Senna and Mansell in front of them retired, otherwise it would have only been 5th and 6th), that the FW12C would be retired and the new car introduced for Portugal. The main reason for the late appearance of the FW13 was that it had originally been designed for the Williams Reactive Ride system and it had to be re-designed and tested with normal or 'passive' suspension with Patrick Head deciding to iron the bugs out before debuting the car, and even then TV commentators were reporting at both Jerez and Suzuka that the handling of the FW13 was still slightly 'off' according to its drivers. Thus, with an eye on possibly finishing 3rd in the 1989 Championship, Patrese actually went back to the FW12C for the Spanish Grand Prix, qualifying 6th and finishing 5th in the last Formula One race for the car while Boutsen qualified 21st in the FW13 and retired on lap 41 with fuel pump failure.

From the next race in Japan, Williams would begin exclusively racing the FW13.

1976 world champion James Hunt test drove the FW12C as a prelude to a potential comeback. He had a secret test at the Paul Ricard Circuit in December 1989 and set competitive times, but eventually decided against returning to the cockpit and remained with BBC TV in 1990.

Overall, the Judd and Renault powered Williams FW12 and FW12C cars scored 1 win, 1 pole position, 2 fastest laps and 9 podium finishes in their 29 races.

== Complete Formula One results ==
(key) (results shown in bold indicate pole position; results in italics indicate fastest lap)

Year	Entrant	Chassis	Engine	Tyres	Driver	1	2	3	4	5	6	7	8	9	10	11	12	13	14	15	16	Pts.	WCC
1988	Canon Williams Team	Williams FW12	Judd CV; V8 NA	G		BRA	SMR	MON	MEX	CAN	DET	FRA	GBR	GER	HUN	BEL	ITA	POR	ESP	JPN	AUS	**20**	7th
1988	Canon Williams Team	Williams FW12	Judd CV; V8 NA	G	Nigel Mansell	Ret	Ret	Ret	Ret	Ret	Ret	Ret	2	Ret	Ret			Ret	2	Ret	Ret	**20**	7th
1988	Canon Williams Team	Williams FW12	Judd CV; V8 NA	G	Martin Brundle											7						**20**	7th
1988	Canon Williams Team	Williams FW12	Judd CV; V8 NA	G	Jean-Louis Schlesser												11					**20**	7th
1988	Canon Williams Team	Williams FW12	Judd CV; V8 NA	G	Riccardo Patrese	Ret	13	6	Ret	Ret	Ret	Ret	8	Ret	6	Ret	7	Ret	5	6	4	**20**	7th
1989	Canon Williams Team	Williams FW12C	Renault RS1; V10	G		BRA	SMR	MON	MEX	USA	CAN	FRA	GBR	GER	HUN	BEL	ITA	POR	ESP	JPN	AUS	**77***	2nd
1989	Canon Williams Team	Williams FW12C	Renault RS1; V10	G	Thierry Boutsen	Ret	4	10	Ret	6	1	Ret	10	Ret	3	4	3					**77***	2nd
1989	Canon Williams Team	Williams FW12C	Renault RS1; V10	G	Riccardo Patrese	15	Ret	15	2	2	2	3	Ret	4	**Ret**	Ret	4		5			**77***	2nd

* 23 points in 1989 scored using Williams FW13

== Sponsors ==
Brand	Country	Placed on
Canon	Japan	Sidepods, nose, front wing, rear wing
Tactel	United States	Fin, nose, front wing end plate
Calma	United States	Sidepods
Denim	Italy	Sidepods
ICI	United Kingdom	Fin, nose
Save The Children	United Kingdom	Side
Mobil 1	United States	Side, nose
Barclay	United States	Side, rear wing end plate, nose
