= Williams FW13 =

Formula One racing car

Williams FW13 Williams FW13B
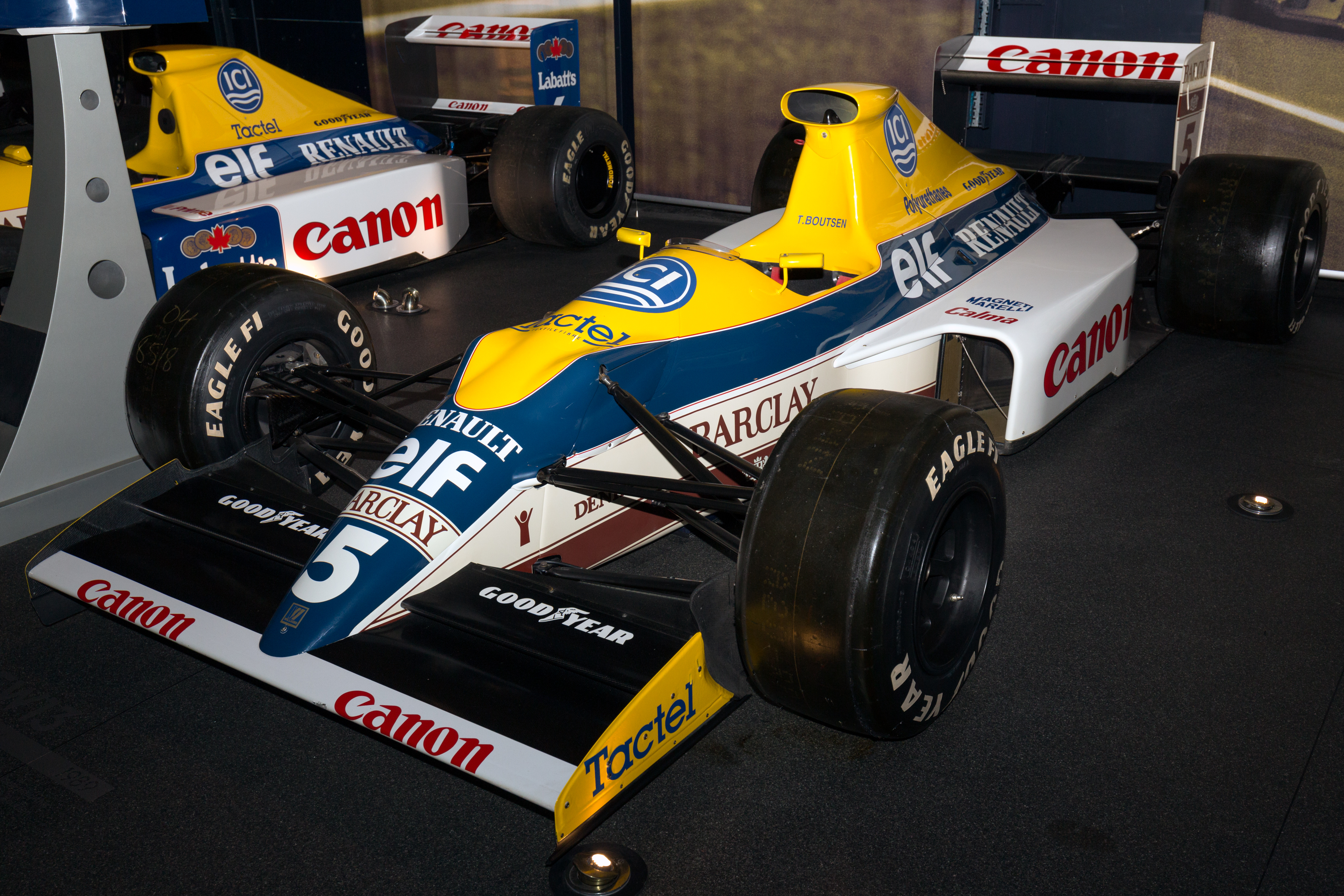
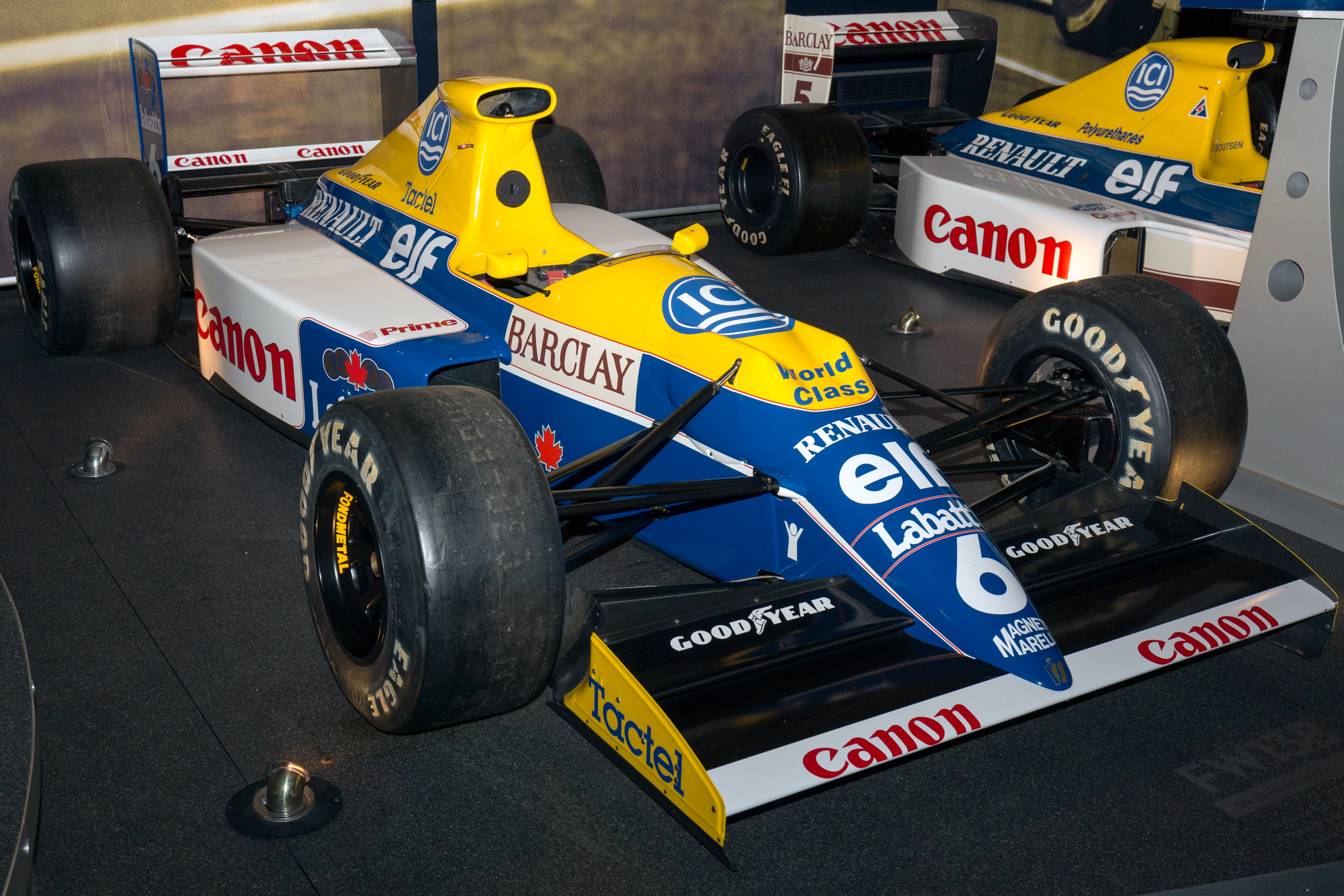
- Thierry Boutsen's Williams FW13 (1989) Riccardo Patrese's Williams FW13B (1990)
- Category: Formula One
- Constructor: Williams (chassis); Renault Sport (engine)
- Designers: Patrick Head (Technical Director); Enrique Scalabroni (Chief Designer); Eghbal Hamidy (Chief Aerodynamicist); Bernard Dudot (Chief Engine Designer (Renault))
- Predecessor: Williams FW12C
- Successor: Williams FW14

Technical specifications
- Chassis: Carbon fibre and Kevlar composite structure
- Suspension (front): Williams double wishbones, push-rod actuated springs and dampers, anti-roll bar
- Suspension (rear): Williams double wishbones, push-rod actuated springs and dampers, anti-roll bar
- Axle track: Front: 1,803 mm (71.0 in); Rear: 1,676 mm (66.0 in)
- Wheelbase: 2,920 mm (115 in)
- Engine: 1989: mid-engine, longitudinally mounted, 3,493 cc (213.2 cu in), Renault RS1, 67° V10, NA; 1990:mid-engine, longitudinally-mounted, 3,493 cc (213.2 cu in), Renault RS2, 67° V10, NA
- Transmission: Williams / Hewland transverse 6-speed manual
- Power: 650–660 hp (484.7–492.2 kW) @ 12,800 rpm
- Fuel: Elf
- Tyres: Goodyear

Competition history
- Notable entrants: Canon Williams Team
- Notable drivers: 5. (Belgium) Thierry Boutsen; 6. (Italy) Riccardo Patrese
- Debut: 1989 Portuguese Grand Prix
- First win: 1989 Australian Grand Prix
- Last win: 1990 Hungarian Grand Prix
- Last event: 1990 Australian Grand Prix
Races	Wins	Poles	F/Laps
20	3	1	4
- Constructors' Championships: 0
- Drivers' Championships: 0

The Williams FW13 was a Formula One racing car used by the Williams team for the last four races of the 1989 Formula One season and, when updated as the FW13B, for the whole of the 1990 season.

== 1989 ==
The FW13 was designed by Argentine Enrique Scalabroni and featured a distinctive oval-shaped air intake, as well as the Renault RS1 3.5-litre V10 engine, Renault's first non-turbo Formula One engine which was rated at approximately 650 bhp (485 kW; 659 PS). The car was driven by Belgian Thierry Boutsen and Italian Riccardo Patrese. It made its racing début late in the 1989 season - at the Portuguese Grand Prix - due to the team's wish to get any bugs out in testing beforehand which forced the team to use an updated version of their 1988 car dubbed the FW12C for the first 12 races of the season, by which time the FW12C had reached its development peak and both Patrese and Boutsen were eagerly awaiting the FW13. Both the drivers and the team agreed the new car was needed to challenge the likes of McLaren with their V10 Honda engines, Ferrari with their V12 engine and innovative Semi-automatic transmission, and the leading V8 powered cars, the Benetton-Fords.

After teething problems saw the Williams pair out of contention in Portugal, Patrese reverted to the old car in Spain while Boutsen continued with the new car. With the bugs finally ironed out, the new car proved very competitive in the final two races of the year, as Patrese and Boutsen finished second and third respectively at Suzuka (though helped by the infamous McLaren collision at the chicane which took out Alain Prost and later saw Ayrton Senna disqualified). The Belgian then won the final race of the year in Australia after a brilliant drive in very wet conditions, with Patrese third. These results enabled Williams to leapfrog Ferrari into second in the Constructors' Championship while Patrese had his best ever year by finishing third in the Driver' Championship behind the McLarens.

BBC Television commentator Murray Walker reported during the Australian GP that the FW13, like its predecessor, was originally designed to use the computer-controlled active suspension rather than the conventional suspension used on most cars at the time. However, after the problems encountered in the first half of 1988 with the FW12, Williams decided more work was needed on getting the active suspension to work better with the naturally aspirated engines of the time and converted the new car to passive suspension. Walker reported that this was the reason the FW13 had so late in making its race debut as the team worked hard in testing to get the handling of the car right before putting it into competition.

== 1990 ==
For the 1990 season, the car was updated, becoming the FW13B. It featured revised sidepods and suspension upgrades, as well as Renault's RS2 3.5-litre V10 engine. The FW13B proved fast and reliable, with Patrese and Boutsen winning one race each – Patrese at "home" in San Marino (the San Marino Grand Prix was actually run at the Imola Circuit in Italy), and Boutsen in Hungary after also claiming pole position. In the latter race, Patrese completed an all-Williams front row, drove the fastest race lap and finished fourth, giving the team plenty to celebrate that weekend. However, the team fell to fourth in the Constructors' Championship, behind Ferrari (with whom Alain Prost challenged for the Drivers' Championship) and Benetton (which won the final two races of the season thanks to former Williams driver Nelson Piquet).

The general feeling around the F1 paddock was that the FW13B was potentially the fastest car on the grid in 1990 and that the only thing holding it back from consistently challenging McLaren, Ferrari and Benetton more often was Williams not having a true number 1 driver, as both Boutsen and Patrese (particularly Boutsen) were seen as journeymen drivers. After French World Champion Alain Prost had announced he would be leaving McLaren at the end of 1989, he began talks with both Ferrari and Williams about driving for them in 1990. Frank Williams was hopeful of signing Prost (who ultimately chose Ferrari) and many including outspoken 1976 World Champion James Hunt felt that had Prost driven the FW13B in 1990 instead of either Boutsen or Patrese then the true potential of the car could have been reached. This need for a true number one driver actually led Frank Williams to bring Nigel Mansell back to the team in 1991 to replace Boutsen (who signed with Ligier) despite the fact that the Belgian had given Williams three of its four wins in 1989 and 1990. Upon re-signing, Mansell tested the car and changed its setup to be more softly sprung at the front (Boutsen allagedly liked his cars set up as stiff as they could get at the front, like a go-kart), as well as requesting more wing to get more use of the Renault's power. The car performed far better in his hands than it had with the regular 1990 drivers (allegedly lapping the Paul Ricard Circuit almost a second faster than his own pole time in the Ferrari in the French GP 6 months earlier and some 1.5 seconds faster than either Boutsen or Patrese had ever managed in the car), leading the team to realise they had been too conservative regarding car set up and had not extracted the car's potential.

The 1990 AUTOCOURSE annual published that the Renault V10 produced around 660 BHP at 13,000 RPM, while the class leading Honda V10 used by McLaren produced around 700 BHP at over 13,000 RPM, giving the Williams-Renault a power deficit of around 40 BHP which on power sensitive circuits such as Hockenheim, Spa, Monza and Suzuka would have meant the Williams-Renault combination was giving away at least 0.3 seconds per lap compared to McLaren-Honda on a like for like basis. This partly explains why the FW13 was not a match for the McLarens on fast circuits.

The FW13B was replaced for the 1991 season by the successful FW14.

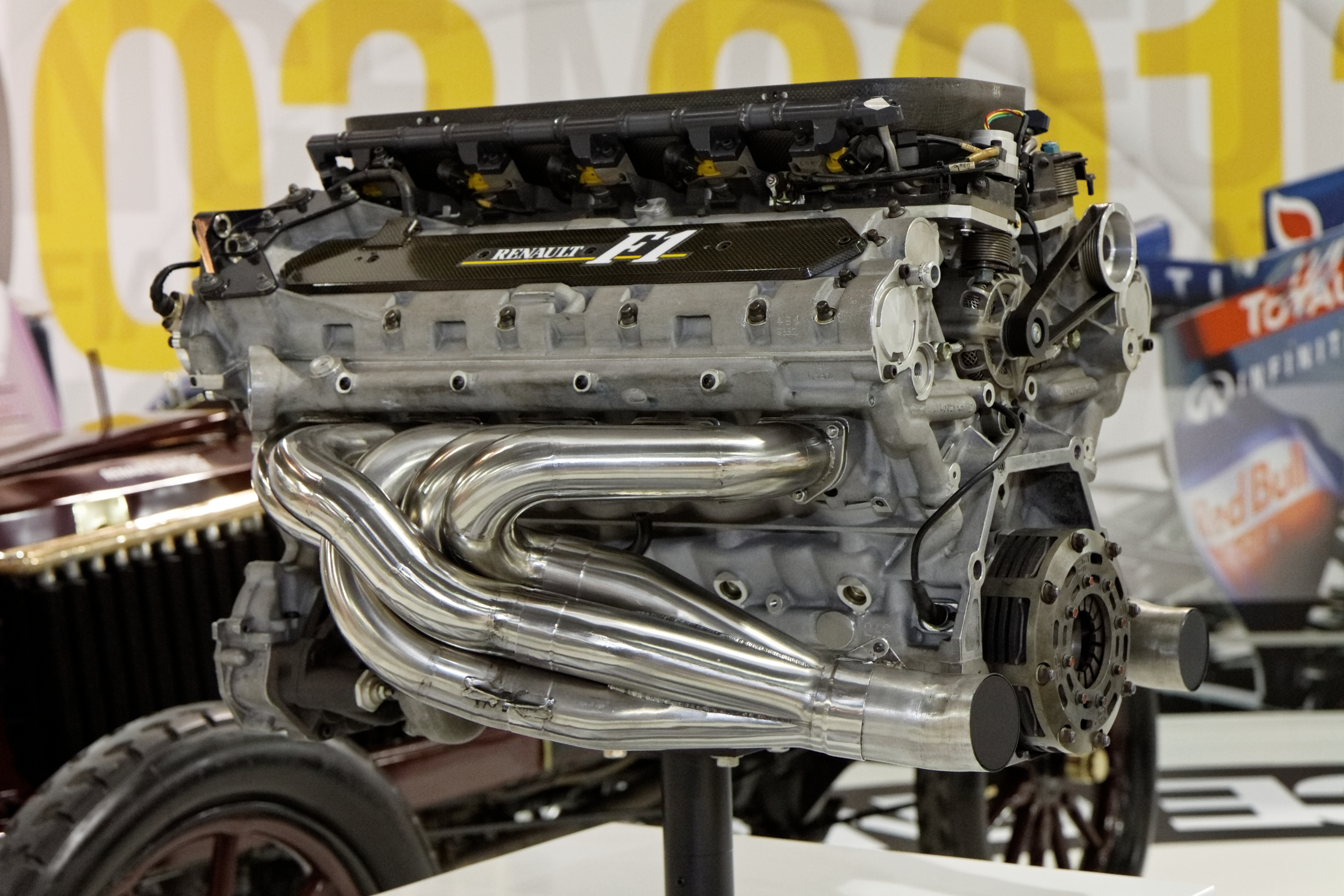
Renault RS2 V10 engine used in 1990

== Complete Formula One results ==
(key) (results shown in bold indicate pole position; results in italics indicate fastest lap)

Year	Entrant	Chassis	Engine	Tyres	Driver	1	2	3	4	5	6	7	8	9	10	11	12	13	14	15	16	Pts.	WCC
1989	Canon Williams Team	FW13	Renault RS1; V10	G		BRA	SMR	MON	MEX	USA	CAN	FRA	GBR	GER	HUN	BEL	ITA	POR	ESP	JPN	AUS	**77***	2nd
1989	Canon Williams Team	FW13	Renault RS1; V10	G	Thierry Boutsen													Ret	Ret	3	1	**77***	2nd
1989	Canon Williams Team	FW13	Renault RS1; V10	G	Riccardo Patrese													Ret		2	3	**77***	2nd
1990	Canon Williams Team	FW13B	Renault RS2; V10	G		USA	BRA	SMR	MON	CAN	MEX	FRA	GBR	GER	HUN	BEL	ITA	POR	ESP	JPN	AUS	**57**	4th
1990	Canon Williams Team	FW13B	Renault RS2; V10	G	Thierry Boutsen	3	5	Ret	4	Ret	5	Ret	2	6	**1**	Ret	Ret	Ret	4	5	5	**57**	4th
1990	Canon Williams Team	FW13B	Renault RS2; V10	G	Riccardo Patrese	9	13	1	Ret	Ret	9	6	Ret	5	4	Ret	5	7	5	4	6	**57**	4th

* 54 points scored in 1989 using FW12C

== FW13 sponsors ==
Brand	Country	Placed on
Canon	Japan	Sidepods, nose, front wing, rear wing
Tactel	United States	Nose, front wing end plate
Calma	United States	Sidepods
Denim	Italy	Sidepods
ICI	United Kingdom	Fin, nose
Save The Children	United Kingdom	Side
Barclay	United States	Side, rear wing end plate, nose
Magnetti Marelli	Italy	Sidepods
Renault	France	Sides, nose
Elf	France	Sides, nose

== FW13B sponsors ==
Brand	Country	Placed on
Canon	Japan	Sidepods, nose, front wing, rear wing
Tactel	United States	Fin, rear wing end plate
ICI	United Kingdom	Fin, nose
Save The Children	United Kingdom	Side
Barclay	United States	Side
Magnetti Marelli	Italy	Nose
Renault	France	Sides, nose
Elf	France	Sides, nose
Labatt's	Canada	Sidepods, nose
