= 1989 Spanish Grand Prix =

- Race 14 of 16 in the 1989 Formula One World Championship

Race details
- Date: 1 October 1989
- Official name: XXXI Gran Premio Tio Pepe de España
- Location: Circuito Permanente de Jerez; Jerez de la Frontera, Spain
- Course: Permanent racing facility
- Course length: 4.218 km (2.6209 miles)
- Distance: 73 laps, 307.918 km (191.328 miles)
- Weather: Dry, hot, sunny

Pole position
Driver	(Brazil) Ayrton Senna	McLaren-Honda
- Time: 1:20.291

Fastest lap
Driver	(Brazil) Ayrton Senna	McLaren-Honda
- Time: 1:25.779 on lap 55

Podium
First	(Brazil) Ayrton Senna	McLaren-Honda
Second	(Austria) Gerhard Berger	Ferrari
Third	(France) Alain Prost	McLaren-Honda

The 1989 Spanish Grand Prix was a Formula One motor race held at Jerez on 1 October 1989. It was the fourteenth race of the 1989 Formula One World Championship. The 73-lap race was won from pole position by Ayrton Senna, driving a McLaren-Honda. Gerhard Berger was second in a Ferrari, while Senna's teammate and Drivers' Championship rival Alain Prost was third.

With Nigel Mansell banned from the race and fined $50,000 following his disqualification and collision with Senna in Portugal the previous week, Ferrari entered only one car for Berger. Senna's win kept the Drivers' Championship alive, but Prost's result meant that the Brazilian had to win both remaining races in order to beat the Frenchman to the title.

== Qualifying ==
=== Pre-qualifying report ===
Osella topped a pre-qualifying session for the first time this season as Nicola Larini was fastest by four tenths of a second, ahead of Onyx driver JJ Lehto. Larini's team-mate Piercarlo Ghinzani was third, only the second time in 1989 he had progressed to the main qualifying sessions. The fourth pre-qualifier was the Larrousse-Lola of Philippe Alliot.

Gabriele Tarquini was fifth in his AGS, his sixth successive failure to pre-qualify. Stefan Johansson was down in sixth in the other Onyx after an engine failure, failing to pre-qualify after his podium achievement at the previous race. Roberto Moreno was seventh in the Coloni, with the other Larrousse-Lola of Michele Alboreto down in eighth, his lowest placing thus far. The usual suspects were in the lower positions, with ninth-placed Bernd Schneider notching up his thirteenth consecutive failure to pre-qualify in the Zakspeed, followed by Yannick Dalmas in the other AGS. Schneider's team-mate Aguri Suzuki was eleventh, his fourteenth failure, ahead of Oscar Larrauri's EuroBrun. Bottom of the timings was Enrico Bertaggia in the second Coloni, over two seconds behind his team-mate Moreno.

=== Pre-qualifying classification ===
Pos	No	Driver	Constructor	Time	Gap
1	17	(Italy) Nicola Larini	Osella-Ford	1:23.566	—
2	37	(Finland) JJ Lehto	Onyx-Ford	1:23.958	+0.392
3	18	(Italy) Piercarlo Ghinzani	Osella-Ford	1:24.586	+1.020
4	30	(France) Philippe Alliot	Lola-Lamborghini	1:24.610	+1.044
5	40	(Italy) Gabriele Tarquini	AGS-Ford	1:24.847	+1.281
6	36	(Sweden) Stefan Johansson	Onyx-Ford	1:24.944	+1.378
7	31	(Brazil) Roberto Moreno	Coloni-Ford	1:25.074	+1.508
8	29	(Italy) Michele Alboreto	Lola-Lamborghini	1:25.646	+2.080
9	34	(West Germany) Bernd Schneider	Zakspeed-Yamaha	1:25.673	+2.107
10	41	(France) Yannick Dalmas	AGS-Ford	1:26.131	+2.565
11	35	(Japan) Aguri Suzuki	Zakspeed-Yamaha	1:26.609	+3.043
12	33	(Argentina) Oscar Larrauri	EuroBrun-Judd	1:26.803	+3.237
13	32	(Italy) Enrico Bertaggia	Coloni-Ford	1:27.236	+3.670

=== Qualifying report ===
Ayrton Senna blasted around the 4.218 km (2.6209 mi) Jerez circuit in 1:20.291 to take his pole position record to 40. Gerhard Berger was second in his Ferrari 640, only 0.274 seconds behind the man who would be his 1990 teammate at McLaren. Over a second behind Senna in third was world championship leader Alain Prost in his McLaren, with the surprise of late season qualifying, Pierluigi Martini, fourth in his Minardi, the Pirelli qualifying tyres once again coming to the fore. Martini had been an incredible second fastest after Friday qualifying, only 0.388 slower than Senna.

Philippe Alliot snared a career best fifth place on the grid in his Larrousse, proving that both the Lola chassis and the Lamborghini V12 designed by Mauro Forghieri was starting to come good. It also enhanced Alliot's reputation as a demon qualifier.

Williams-Renault entered two different model cars for their drivers Thierry Boutsen and Riccardo Patrese. Boutsen qualified 21st the new Williams FW13 that had debuted in Portugal, while Patrese with an eye on possibly finishing 3rd in the Drivers' Championship, reverted to the older model FW12C and ended up sixth on the grid ahead his former Brabham teammate Nelson Piquet in a surprisingly fast Lotus.

René Arnoux (Ligier) and the Rial pair of Pierre-Henri Raphanel and Gregor Foitek all failed to qualify for the race.

=== Qualifying classification ===
Pos	No	Driver	Constructor	Q1	Q2	Gap
1	1	(Brazil) Ayrton Senna	McLaren-Honda	1:21.855	1:20.291	—
2	28	(Austria) Gerhard Berger	Ferrari	1:22.276	1:20.565	+0.274
3	2	(France) Alain Prost	McLaren-Honda	1:23.113	1:21.368	+1.077
4	23	(Italy) Pierluigi Martini	Minardi-Ford	1:22.243	1:21.479	+1.188
5	30	(France) Philippe Alliot	Lola-Lamborghini	1:23.597	1:21.708	+1.417
6	6	(Italy) Riccardo Patrese	Williams-Renault	1:24.033	1:21.777	+1.486
7	11	(Brazil) Nelson Piquet	Lotus-Judd	1:23.235	1:21.922	+1.631
8	7	(United Kingdom) Martin Brundle	Brabham-Judd	1:23.761	1:22.133	+1.842
9	4	(France) Jean Alesi	Tyrrell-Ford	1:24.615	1:22.363	+2.072
10	20	(Italy) Emanuele Pirro	Benetton-Ford	1:24.647	1:22.567	+2.276
11	17	(Italy) Nicola Larini	Osella-Ford	1:23.538	1:22.620	+2.329
12	8	(Italy) Stefano Modena	Brabham-Judd	1:23.679	1:22.826	+2.535
13	3	(United Kingdom) Jonathan Palmer	Tyrrell-Ford	1:23.494	1:23.052	+2.761
14	19	(Italy) Alessandro Nannini	Benetton-Ford	1:24.233	1:23.105	+2.814
15	22	(Italy) Andrea de Cesaris	Dallara-Ford	1:24.900	1:23.186	+2.895
16	9	(United Kingdom) Derek Warwick	Arrows-Ford	1:24.161	1:23.222	+2.931
17	37	(Finland) JJ Lehto	Onyx-Ford	1:24.322	1:23.243	+2.952
18	12	(Japan) Satoru Nakajima	Lotus-Judd	—	1:23.309	+3.018
19	16	(Italy) Ivan Capelli	March-Judd	1:23.401	—	+3.110
20	24	(Spain) Luis Pérez-Sala	Minardi-Ford	1:23.908	1:23.443	+3.152
21	5	(Belgium) Thierry Boutsen	Williams-Renault	1:24.839	1:23.657	+3.366
22	10	(United States) Eddie Cheever	Arrows-Ford	1:24.222	1:23.729	+3.438
23	21	(Italy) Alex Caffi	Dallara-Ford	1:24.658	1:23.763	+3.472
24	26	(France) Olivier Grouillard	Ligier-Ford	1:24.991	1:23.931	+3.640
25	18	(Italy) Piercarlo Ghinzani	Osella-Ford	1:26.147	1:24.003	+3.712
26	15	(Brazil) Maurício Gugelmin	March-Judd	1:28.311	1:24.707	+4.416
27	25	(France) René Arnoux	Ligier-Ford	1:26.767	1:25.190	+4.899
28	39	(France) Pierre-Henri Raphanel	Rial-Ford	1:28.311	1:25.443	+5.152
29	38	(Switzerland) Gregor Foitek	Rial-Ford	—	1:29.226	+8.935

== Race ==
=== Race report ===
McLaren's reigning World Champion Ayrton Senna took the pole, set the fastest race lap and kept the world championship alive with his sixth win of the season. Second with his third podium finish in a row following his second in Italy and his win in the previous race in Portugal was the Ferrari 640 of Gerhard Berger. World Championship leader Alain Prost finished third in his McLaren-Honda in what was his last race finish for the team with whom he won the 1985 and 1986 World Drivers' Championships.

Rounding out the points were the 'find of the season' Jean Alesi in his Tyrrell in fourth, the older model Williams-Renault of Patrese in fifth in what would be the FW12C's final race, and giving the Lamborghini V12 its first ever points finish in Formula One was Alliot in what would be the best drive of his Grand Prix career.

Prost's third place gave him a 16-point lead over Senna with only two races to go. If he was to retain his title, the Brazilian would need to win in both Japan and Australia.

=== Race classification ===
Pos	No	Driver	Constructor	Laps	Time/Retired	Grid	Points
1	1	(Brazil) Ayrton Senna	McLaren-Honda	73	1:47:48.264	1	9
2	28	(Austria) Gerhard Berger	Ferrari	73	+ 27.051	2	6
3	2	(France) Alain Prost	McLaren-Honda	73	+ 53.788	3	4
4	4	(France) Jean Alesi	Tyrrell-Ford	72	+ 1 Lap	9	3
5	6	(Italy) Riccardo Patrese	Williams-Renault	72	+ 1 Lap	6	2
6	30	(France) Philippe Alliot	Lola-Lamborghini	72	+ 1 Lap	5	1
7	22	(Italy) Andrea de Cesaris	Dallara-Ford	72	+ 1 Lap	15	
8	11	(Brazil) Nelson Piquet	Lotus-Judd	71	+ 2 Laps	7	
9	9	(United Kingdom) Derek Warwick	Arrows-Ford	71	+ 2 Laps	16	
10	3	(United Kingdom) Jonathan Palmer	Tyrrell-Ford	71	+ 2 Laps	13	
Ret	10	(United States) Eddie Cheever	Arrows-Ford	61	Engine	22	
Ret	20	(Italy) Emanuele Pirro	Benetton-Ford	59	Spun Off	10	
Ret	21	(Italy) Alex Caffi	Dallara-Ford	55	Engine	23	
Ret	7	(United Kingdom) Martin Brundle	Brabham-Judd	51	Spun Off	8	
Ret	15	(Brazil) Maurício Gugelmin	March-Judd	47	Collision	26	
Ret	24	(Spain) Luis Pérez-Sala	Minardi-Ford	47	Spun Off	20	
Ret	5	(Belgium) Thierry Boutsen	Williams-Renault	40	Fuel Pump	21	
Ret	26	(France) Olivier Grouillard	Ligier-Ford	34	Engine	24	
Ret	23	(Italy) Pierluigi Martini	Minardi-Ford	27	Spun Off	4	
Ret	16	(Italy) Ivan Capelli	March-Judd	23	Transmission	19	
Ret	37	(Finland) JJ Lehto	Onyx-Ford	20	Gearbox	17	
Ret	18	(Italy) Piercarlo Ghinzani	Osella-Ford	17	Gearbox	25	
Ret	19	(Italy) Alessandro Nannini	Benetton-Ford	14	Spun Off	14	
Ret	8	(Italy) Stefano Modena	Brabham-Judd	11	Electrical	12	
Ret	17	(Italy) Nicola Larini	Osella-Ford	6	Suspension	11	
Ret	12	(Japan) Satoru Nakajima	Lotus-Judd	0	Collision	18	
DNQ	25	(France) René Arnoux	Ligier-Ford				
DNQ	39	(France) Pierre-Henri Raphanel	Rial-Ford				
DNQ	38	(Switzerland) Gregor Foitek	Rial-Ford				
DNPQ	40	(Italy) Gabriele Tarquini	AGS-Ford				
DNPQ	36	(Sweden) Stefan Johansson	Onyx-Ford				
DNPQ	31	(Brazil) Roberto Moreno	Coloni-Ford				
DNPQ	29	(Italy) Michele Alboreto	Lola-Lamborghini				
DNPQ	35	(Japan) Aguri Suzuki	Zakspeed-Yamaha				
DNPQ	41	(France) Yannick Dalmas	AGS-Ford				
DNPQ	34	(West Germany) Bernd Schneider	Zakspeed-Yamaha				
DNPQ	33	(Argentina) Oscar Larrauri	EuroBrun-Judd				
DNPQ	32	(Italy) Enrico Bertaggia	Coloni-Ford				

== Championship standings after the race ==
Drivers' Championship standings

Pos	Driver	Points
1	(France) Alain Prost	76 (81)
2	(Brazil) Ayrton Senna	60
3	(United Kingdom) Nigel Mansell	38
4	(Italy) Riccardo Patrese	30
5	(Belgium) Thierry Boutsen	24

Constructors' Championship standings

Pos	Constructor	Points
1	(United Kingdom) McLaren-Honda	141
2	(Italy) Ferrari	59
3	(United Kingdom) Williams-Renault	54
4	(United Kingdom) Benetton-Ford	22
5	(United Kingdom) Tyrrell-Ford	16

- Note: Only the top five positions are included for both sets of standings.

Previous race: 1989 Portuguese Grand Prix	FIA Formula One World Championship; 1989 season	Next race: 1989 Japanese Grand Prix
Previous race: 1988 Spanish Grand Prix	Spanish Grand Prix	Next race: 1990 Spanish Grand Prix
