= Enrique Scalabroni =

Argentinian race car designer and technical director

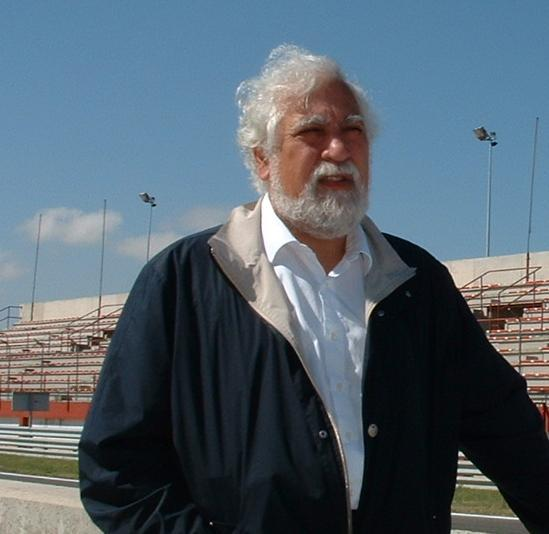
- Enrique Scalabroni in 2006 at the Albacete Circuit in Spain
- Born: Enrique Héctor Scalabroni Ceballos; 20 October 1949 (age 76); Alta Gracia, Córdoba, Argentina

Enrique Héctor Scalabroni Ceballos (born 20 October 1949) is an Argentinian race car designer, technical director, and team racing boss. He was employed by Dallara, Williams, Ferrari, Lotus and Peugeot Sport between 1985 and 2002, before setting up his own F3000 and GP2 team in 2003, BCN Competicion, which lasted till the end of 2008.

== Early career ==
Scalabroni was born in Cordoba and studied mechanical engineering at the National Technological University in Buenos Aires before being recruited by the Formula Renault Fama team in 1975. He later worked for the Osvaldo Antelo Renault F2 and Miguel Herceg's Ford Turismo Carretera factory-backed teams. In Argentina he designed and built his own Formula Renault and national F2 single seater cars.

Scalabroni arrived in Europe in 1982 from Argentina at the age of 32. He evolved to become one of the principal designers at Williams, chief designer at Ferrari and Lotus, and the Technical Director with the Asiatech F1 engine manufacturing company.

== Formula One ==
Scalabroni moved to Italy in 1982, finding a job with the Dallara Automobili group. There, he designed the first company wind tunnel and one of the pioneer carbon monocoque chassis for small single seaters: a trend setting Formula 3 car with rearward sloping sidepods, for the 1983 season.

In 1985, Williams F1 recruited Scalabroni as a designer. At Williams, Scalabroni contributed a substantial part of the six speed sequential gearbox design that Williams pioneered for F1 racing.

After John Barnard's tenure at Ferrari (1987–1989), Scalabroni joined the team as chassis and aerodynamics Chief Designer in September 1989. There, he developed Barnard's Ferrari 640 carbon chassis. The Scalabroni-designed 641 and 641/2 Ferraris were designed in collaboration with Steve Nichols and won six races in 1990 with Alain Prost and Nigel Mansell. Ferrari took second place in the Constructors Championship.

In 1991, Scalabroni was recruited by Lotus F1 Team, where he produced the Lotus 102B for drivers Johnny Herbert, Mika Häkkinen and Julian Bailey. Before leaving the Hethel team, Scalabroni left one audacious project: an F1 car with the four wheels set up as a cross or rhomboid, two at the sides, protruding from the middle section and one each at the front and rear. Lack of financing ended this project.

At the same time, the South American engineer was consultant for the De Tomaso Guarà, in charge of chassis and suspension design. In this role with the De Tomaso company Scalabroni also worked on the development of the Biguá, subsequently known as Qvale Mangusta, after the De Tomaso family sold the firm's assets to new American investors.

== Le Mans with Peugeot ==
Towards the end of 1992, Scalabroni went to Peugeot Sport, then concentrating on the "avant projet" Formula One car under the watchful eye of Andre de Cortanze and Jean Todt.

When the PSA top executives denied Todt the resources necessary for an F1 team, the mercurial racing boss left for Ferrari and, soon afterwards, Scalabroni was on his way to a company owned by Takeo Ikuzawa. Ikuzawa wanted to establish his own F1 team and during two years Scalabroni and a small team of engineers designed and aerodynamically tested the scale models of the future car.

That project was stopped, but Scalabroni remained with Ikuzawa till 1998 designing different systems for the Japanese automotive and motorcycle industry, claiming several patents in the process. Williams re-hired him in 1998 and the team's BTCC Renault Lagunas used efficient aerodynamic and mechanical solutions from Scalabroni.

== Other work ==
When his consultancy agreement with Williams ended, Scalabroni started, late in 1999, what was to be the Asiatech engine Formula 1 project. Scalabroni agreed a deal with Peugeot to purchase the assets of Peugeot's F1 engine program, renamed Asiatech F1, and kept the factory and personnel. While Asiatech gave its engines to Arrows in 2001, Scalabroni started a technical office to design an F1 chassis in the former Williams BTCC premises at Didcot, England, financed by the same group of companies which owned Asiatech, and headed by Hideo Morita, the heir of the Sony Corporation founder. In 2002 Asiatech was Minardi's engine supplier but, unable to find proper financing and customers, the company closed its door at the end of the year.

In 2003, Scalabroni established his own team, BCN Competición, based in Granollers, Barcelona, Spain, associated to his Spanish friend Jaume Pintanel. With Scalabroni at the helm, BCN Competición competed in Formula Nissan Lights in 2002, then in a Formula 3000 with which Enrico Toccacelo gave the team a victory and second position in the 2003 championship. Scalabroni got one of the GP2 licenses in 2004 and remained in that series till the end of 2008. At the end of the 2008 season, Scalabroni sold the GP2 license and cars to a group of companies represented by Portuguese driver Tiago Monteiro, who set up the new Ocean Racing Technology team. When the deal was clinched, Scalabroni concentrated on other new projects.
