= 1989 Portuguese Grand Prix =

- Race 13 of 16 in the 1989 Formula One World Championship
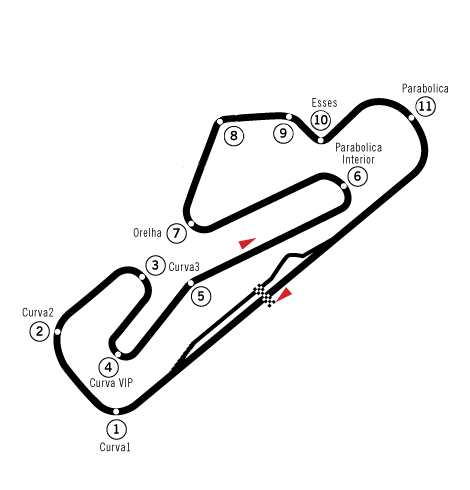

Race details
- Date: 24 September 1989
- Official name: XXIII Grande Prémio de Portugal
- Location: Autódromo do Estoril; Estoril, Portugal
- Course: Permanent racing facility
- Course length: 4.350 km (2.703 miles)
- Distance: 71 laps, 308.850 km (191.910 miles)
- Weather: Hot, dry, sunny

Pole position
Driver	(Brazil) Ayrton Senna	McLaren-Honda
- Time: 1:15.468

Fastest lap
Driver	(Austria) Gerhard Berger	Ferrari
- Time: 1:18.986 on lap 49

Podium
First	(Austria) Gerhard Berger	Ferrari
Second	(France) Alain Prost	McLaren-Honda
Third	(Sweden) Stefan Johansson	Onyx-Ford

The 1989 Portuguese Grand Prix (formally the XXIII Grande Prémio de Portugal) was a Formula One motor race held at the Autódromo do Estoril in Estoril, Portugal on 24 September 1989. It was the thirteenth race of the 1989 Formula One World Championship.

The 71-lap race was won by Austrian driver Gerhard Berger, driving a Ferrari, with Frenchman Alain Prost second in a McLaren-Honda and Swede Stefan Johansson third in an Onyx-Ford. Prost's teammate and Drivers' Championship rival, Brazilian Ayrton Senna, retired following a collision with the Ferrari of Briton Nigel Mansell, who had been black-flagged for reversing in the pit lane. As a result, Prost moved 24 points clear of Senna in the championship with three races remaining.

As well as Johansson taking Onyx's only podium finish, the race also saw Italian Pierluigi Martini lead for one lap – the first and only time the Minardi team led a Formula One race – and ten drivers from ten different teams finish in the top ten places. The race was also Prost's 150th Grand Prix start and the last start for the Coloni team, though it would continue in F1 until the end of 1991.

== Qualifying ==
=== Pre-qualifying report ===
Onyx returned to the top of the Friday morning time sheets as Stefan Johansson was fastest by half a second. His new team-mate was Finnish driver JJ Lehto, who had replaced Bertrand Gachot since the last race, after Gachot openly criticised the team and was fired. In his first Formula One event, Lehto just missed out on pre-qualification after a suspension failure during the session, leaving him fifth. The Larrousse-Lola cars both pre-qualified again, with Philippe Alliot second and Michele Alboreto fourth. The other driver to go through to the main qualifying sessions was Roberto Moreno in third place in the Coloni.

Yannick Dalmas had originally pre-qualified in third place in his AGS, but was excluded from the session and his times were deleted, after mistakenly using the wrong tyres. Also excluded was Osella driver Nicola Larini, for missing a weight check, although he had already failed to pre-qualify, being only ninth fastest.

The other drivers who failed to proceed any further included the other Osella of Piercarlo Ghinzani, who outpaced his team-mate in sixth, and Oscar Larrauri, despite an improvement to seventh in the EuroBrun. Eighth was Gabriele Tarquini in the other AGS, ahead of the Zakspeeds of Aguri Suzuki and Bernd Schneider. Slowest by nearly four seconds was the second Coloni of Enrico Bertaggia, the third time in a row the Italian had been bottom of the time sheets.

=== Pre-qualifying classification ===
Pos	No	Driver	Constructor	Time	Gap
1	36	(Sweden) Stefan Johansson	Onyx-Ford	1:18.623	—
2	30	(France) Philippe Alliot	Lola-Lamborghini	1:19.164	+0.541
3	31	(Brazil) Roberto Moreno	Coloni-Ford	1:19.780	+1.157
4	29	(Italy) Michele Alboreto	Lola-Lamborghini	1:19.869	+1.246
5	37	(Finland) JJ Lehto	Onyx-Ford	1:20.880	+2.257
6	18	(Italy) Piercarlo Ghinzani	Osella-Ford	1:21.021	+2.398
7	33	(Argentina) Oscar Larrauri	EuroBrun-Judd	1:21.326	+2.703
8	40	(Italy) Gabriele Tarquini	AGS-Ford	1:21.881	+3.258
9	35	(Japan) Aguri Suzuki	Zakspeed-Yamaha	1:24.116	+5.493
10	34	(West Germany) Bernd Schneider	Zakspeed-Yamaha	1:24.732	+6.109
11	32	(Italy) Enrico Bertaggia	Coloni-Ford	1:28.526	+9.903
EX	41	(France) Yannick Dalmas	AGS-Ford	—	—
EX	17	(Italy) Nicola Larini	Osella-Ford	—	—

=== Qualifying report ===
Qualifying saw McLaren's Ayrton Senna take his tenth pole position of the season, with the Ferrari of Gerhard Berger alongside him on the front row. Nigel Mansell took third in the other Ferrari, with Alain Prost fourth in the other McLaren. Pierluigi Martini impressed by qualifying fifth in his Minardi, ahead of the two Williams of Riccardo Patrese and Thierry Boutsen in sixth and eighth respectively, with Alex Caffi seventh in the Dallara. The top ten was completed by Luis Pérez-Sala in the second Minardi and Martin Brundle in the Brabham. Further down the grid, Stefan Johansson took 12th in his Onyx after setting the fastest time in pre-qualifying, while another pre-qualifier, Roberto Moreno, took 15th, the best-ever grid position for the Coloni team.

This was Christian Danner's last Formula One qualifying attempt as he was fired by Rial after this race.

The Minardi, Dallara, Brabham and Coloni teams all had their tyres supplied by Pirelli, whose special qualifying tyres were generally regarded as being superior to those of Goodyear. However, Goodyear's race tyres were still acknowledged as being superior to Pirelli's.

=== Qualifying classification ===
Pos	No	Driver	Constructor	Q1	Q2	Gap
1	1	(Brazil) Ayrton Senna	McLaren-Honda	1:15.496	1:15.468	—
2	28	(Austria) Gerhard Berger	Ferrari	1:16.799	1:16.059	+0.591
3	27	(United Kingdom) Nigel Mansell	Ferrari	1:17.387	1:16.193	+0.725
4	2	(France) Alain Prost	McLaren-Honda	1:17.336	1:16.204	+0.736
5	23	(Italy) Pierluigi Martini	Minardi-Ford	1:16.938	1:17.161	+1.470
6	6	(Italy) Riccardo Patrese	Williams-Renault	1:17.281	1:17.852	+1.813
7	21	(Italy) Alex Caffi	Dallara-Ford	1:18.623	1:17.661	+2.193
8	5	(Belgium) Thierry Boutsen	Williams-Renault	1:17.801	1:17.888	+2.333
9	24	(Spain) Luis Pérez-Sala	Minardi-Ford	1:17.844	1:18.305	+2.376
10	7	(United Kingdom) Martin Brundle	Brabham-Judd	1:17.874	1:17.995	+2.406
11	8	(Italy) Stefano Modena	Brabham-Judd	1:18.589	1:18.093	+2.625
12	36	(Sweden) Stefan Johansson	Onyx-Ford	1:19.281	1:18.105	+2.637
13	19	(Italy) Alessandro Nannini	Benetton-Ford	1:18.115	1:18.359	+2.647
14	15	(Brazil) Maurício Gugelmin	March-Judd	1:18.124	1:18.277	+2.656
15	31	(Brazil) Roberto Moreno	Coloni-Ford	1:18.196	1:20.512	+2.728
16	20	(Italy) Emanuele Pirro	Benetton-Ford	1:18.340	1:18.328	+2.860
17	30	(France) Philippe Alliot	Lola-Lamborghini	1:19.306	1:18.386	+2.918
18	3	(United Kingdom) Jonathan Palmer	Tyrrell-Ford	1:19.172	1:18.404	+2.936
19	22	(Italy) Andrea de Cesaris	Dallara-Ford	1:18.442	1:18.511	+2.974
20	11	(Brazil) Nelson Piquet	Lotus-Judd	1:18.482	1:18.682	+3.014
21	29	(Italy) Michele Alboreto	Lola-Lamborghini	1:18.563	1:18.846	+3.095
22	9	(United Kingdom) Derek Warwick	Arrows-Ford	1:18.711	1:18.892	+3.243
23	25	(France) René Arnoux	Ligier-Ford	1:18.767	1:19.979	+3.299
24	16	(Italy) Ivan Capelli	March-Judd	1:19.079	1:18.785	+3.317
25	12	(Japan) Satoru Nakajima	Lotus-Judd	1:19.278	1:19.165	+3.697
26	10	(United States) Eddie Cheever	Arrows-Ford	1:19.247	1:20.006	+3.779
27	4	(United Kingdom) Johnny Herbert	Tyrrell-Ford	1:19.515	1:19.264	+3.796
28	26	(France) Olivier Grouillard	Ligier-Ford	1:19.605	1:19.436	+3.968
29	39	(France) Pierre-Henri Raphanel	Rial-Ford	No time	1:21.435	+5.967
30	38	(West Germany) Christian Danner	Rial-Ford	1:21.678	1:22.423	+6.210

== Race ==
=== Race report ===
Berger had a great start and managed to overtake Senna. Mansell was in third followed by Prost, Martini and Patrese. Berger quickly opened a lead while Senna was trying to keep Mansell behind. Then Mansell finally managed to overtake Senna and started to catch Berger. As the two Ferraris caught up with the slower cars and were starting to lap them, Mansell managed to overtake Berger. Positions at lap 24 were: Mansell, Berger, Senna and Prost. Prost was the first of the leaders to pit for new tyres from fourth position. He was quickly followed by Berger on lap 35 and then by Senna. Then came the crucial moment of the race. Mansell came into the pits slightly too fast, locked his tyres and missed his pit box by a few metres. Although his pit crew moved down the pit lane to try to change his tyres where he had stopped, Mansell engaged reverse gear and drove backwards the short distance into the correct spot, despite the Ferrari mechanics signalling to him to not reverse the car. After the leaders went to pit for tyres, Martini led a lap in the Minardi, the only time in F1 history that a Minardi car was at the front leading. Mansell was down in fourth. Berger, Senna and Mansell quickly overtook Martini and Mansell closed on Senna. However, as driving a car in reverse in the pit lane was expressly forbidden (the pit crew may legally push a car backwards), Mansell was given the black disqualification flag. At the start of lap 48, approaching Turn 1 even while the black flag was being waved at him Mansell tried to overtake Senna, the cars collided and both drivers were out. This damaged Senna's title chances, especially since rival Alain Prost came in second place. The race was won by Berger ahead of Prost, with Stefan Johansson a surprising third in the underfunded Onyx; the Swede did not make a pit-stop at any stage of the race and was initially on course for fifth place until both Williams-Renault entries were pulled out with overheating issues. It turned out to be Johansson's final career podium.

As of 2026, Johansson's podium remains the last for a Swedish driver in Formula One.

=== Race classification ===
Pos	No	Driver	Constructor	Laps	Time/Retired	Grid	Points
1	28	(Austria) Gerhard Berger	Ferrari	71	1:36:48.546	2	9
2	2	(France) Alain Prost	McLaren-Honda	71	+ 32.637	4	6
3	36	(Sweden) Stefan Johansson	Onyx-Ford	71	+ 55.325	12	4
4	19	(Italy) Alessandro Nannini	Benetton-Ford	71	+ 1:22.369	13	3
5	23	(Italy) Pierluigi Martini	Minardi-Ford	70	+ 1 lap	5	2
6	3	(United Kingdom) Jonathan Palmer	Tyrrell-Ford	70	+ 1 lap	18	1
7	12	(Japan) Satoru Nakajima	Lotus-Judd	70	+ 1 lap	25	
8	7	(United Kingdom) Martin Brundle	Brabham-Judd	70	+ 1 lap	10	
9	30	(France) Philippe Alliot	Lola-Lamborghini	70	+ 1 lap	17	
10	15	(Brazil) Maurício Gugelmin	March-Judd	69	+ 2 laps	14	
11	29	(Italy) Michele Alboreto	Lola-Lamborghini	69	+ 2 laps	21	
12	24	(Spain) Luis Pérez-Sala	Minardi-Ford	69	+ 2 laps	9	
13	25	(France) René Arnoux	Ligier-Ford	69	+ 2 laps	23	
14	8	(Italy) Stefano Modena	Brabham-Judd	69	+ 2 laps	11	
Ret	6	(Italy) Riccardo Patrese	Williams-Renault	60	Overheating	6	
Ret	5	(Belgium) Thierry Boutsen	Williams-Renault	60	Overheating	8	
Ret	1	(Brazil) Ayrton Senna	McLaren-Honda	48	Collision	1	
DSQ	27	(United Kingdom) Nigel Mansell	Ferrari	48	Reversed in pits (Collision)	3	
Ret	9	(United Kingdom) Derek Warwick	Arrows-Ford	37	Accident	22	
Ret	11	(Brazil) Nelson Piquet	Lotus-Judd	33	Collision	20	
Ret	21	(Italy) Alex Caffi	Dallara-Ford	33	Collision	7	
Ret	20	(Italy) Emanuele Pirro	Benetton-Ford	29	Suspension	16	
Ret	16	(Italy) Ivan Capelli	March-Judd	25	Engine	24	
Ret	10	(United States) Eddie Cheever	Arrows-Ford	24	Spun off	26	
Ret	22	(Italy) Andrea de Cesaris	Dallara-Ford	17	Electrical	19	
Ret	31	(Brazil) Roberto Moreno	Coloni-Ford	11	Electrical	15	
DNQ	4	(United Kingdom) Johnny Herbert	Tyrrell-Ford				
DNQ	26	(France) Olivier Grouillard	Ligier-Ford				
DNQ	39	(France) Pierre-Henri Raphanel	Rial-Ford				
DNQ	38	(West Germany) Christian Danner	Rial-Ford				
DNPQ	41	(France) Yannick Dalmas	AGS-Ford				
DNPQ	37	(Finland) JJ Lehto	Onyx-Ford				
DNPQ	18	(Italy) Piercarlo Ghinzani	Osella-Ford				
DNPQ	33	(Argentina) Oscar Larrauri	EuroBrun-Judd				
DNPQ	40	(Italy) Gabriele Tarquini	AGS-Ford				
DNPQ	17	(Italy) Nicola Larini	Osella-Ford				
DNPQ	35	(Japan) Aguri Suzuki	Zakspeed-Yamaha				
DNPQ	34	(West Germany) Bernd Schneider	Zakspeed-Yamaha				
DNPQ	32	(Italy) Enrico Bertaggia	Coloni-Ford				

== Championship standings after the race ==
Drivers' Championship standings

Pos	Driver	Points
1	(France) Alain Prost	75 (77)
2	(Brazil) Ayrton Senna	51
3	(United Kingdom) Nigel Mansell	38
4	(Italy) Riccardo Patrese	28
5	(Belgium) Thierry Boutsen	24

Constructors' Championship standings

Pos	Constructor	Points
1	(United Kingdom) McLaren-Honda	128
2	(Italy) Ferrari	53
3	(United Kingdom) Williams-Renault	52
4	(United Kingdom) Benetton-Ford	22
5	(United Kingdom) Tyrrell-Ford	13

- Note: Only the top five positions are included for both sets of standings.

Previous race: 1989 Italian Grand Prix	FIA Formula One World Championship; 1989 season	Next race: 1989 Spanish Grand Prix
Previous race: 1988 Portuguese Grand Prix	Portuguese Grand Prix	Next race: 1990 Portuguese Grand Prix
