= 1989 Australian Grand Prix =

Race 16 of 16 in the 1989 Formula One World Championship
| ← Previous race | Next race → |

Race details
- Date: 5 November 1989
- Official name: LIV Foster's Australian Grand Prix
- Location: Adelaide Street Circuit; Adelaide, South Australia
- Course: Temporary street circuit
- Course length: 3.780 km (2.349 miles)
- Distance: 70 laps, 264.600 km (164.43 miles)
- Scheduled distance: 81 laps, 306.81 km (190.269 miles)
- Weather: Wet, cool

Pole position
| Driver | (Brazil) Ayrton Senna | McLaren-Honda |
- Time: 1:16.665

Fastest lap
| Driver | (Japan) Satoru Nakajima | Lotus-Judd |
- Time: 1:38.480 on lap 64

Podium
| First | (Belgium) Thierry Boutsen | Williams-Renault |
| Second | (Italy) Alessandro Nannini | Benetton-Ford |
| Third | (Italy) Riccardo Patrese | Williams-Renault |

The 1989 Australian Grand Prix was a Formula One motor race held at Adelaide on 5 November 1989. It was the sixteenth and final race of the 1989 Formula One World Championship.

The race took place in wet conditions, with only 70 of the scheduled 81 laps run before the two-hour time limit was reached. It was stopped and restarted following a first-lap collision, with Frenchman Alain Prost declining to take the restart in his McLaren-Honda. Prost's Brazilian teammate, Ayrton Senna, started from pole position and led the first 13 laps before colliding with the Brabham-Judd of Briton Martin Brundle, after which Belgian Thierry Boutsen led the remainder of the race in his Williams-Renault. Boutsen won by 28 seconds from Italian Alessandro Nannini in a Benetton-Ford, with another Italian, Riccardo Patrese, third in the other Williams-Renault.

This was the final Formula One race for Frenchman René Arnoux, American Eddie Cheever and Italian Piercarlo Ghinzani, and the final race entered by Briton Jonathan Palmer, who failed to qualify. It was also the final race entered by the German Zakspeed and Rial teams.

== Background ==
The race weekend saw continuing fallout from the events in Japan two weeks previously, where the McLaren-Hondas of Alain Prost and Ayrton Senna had taken each other out in their battle for the race lead and the World Championship with seven laps remaining. A post-race disqualification to Senna for cutting the chicane to return to the circuit saw Prost confirmed as a triple World Champion and Senna was unhappy with the sport's governing body, the Fédération Internationale du Sport Automobile (FISA), and in particular its French president Jean-Marie Balestre whom he accused of rigging the championship for his countryman. Senna initially threatened to boycott the event and leave Formula One altogether. However, after lengthy talks with his family and McLaren boss Ron Dennis, he reluctantly showed up at Adelaide and immediately set the pace on Friday. Prost was determined to go out on a high note in his last Grand Prix for McLaren before joining Ferrari.

McLaren were appealing Senna's Japanese Grand Prix disqualification. Ron Dennis said in a press conference that the appeal was not motivated against Prost (who was leaving the team) winning the championship, but simply that the team believed it had unjustly lost a race win, including the prize money as well as sponsorship bonuses from team backers such as Marlboro. This meant that if Senna won in Adelaide he could still be declared champion if his disqualification from Japan was overturned. In a hearing in Paris the week after Japan, FISA had also labelled Senna as a 'dangerous driver' (citing a number of incidents involving the 1988 World Champion) and gave him a six-month suspended sentence.

In other news, after pre-qualifying his car on the Thursday, Piercarlo Ghinzani announced his retirement from Formula One after 76 races. Ghinzani qualified 21st for his final Grand Prix. He had taken one points finish in his Formula One career, when he finished 5th at the 1984 Dallas Grand Prix for Osella. At the drivers meeting before the race Ligier driver René Arnoux also announced his retirement from Formula One racing, at the age of 41. He qualified 26th and last for what would be his 149th start in Grand Prix racing having begun his career in 1978.

== Qualifying ==
=== Pre-qualifying report ===
In his last appearance for the Osella team, Nicola Larini was fastest in pre-qualifying for the third Grand Prix in succession, and his team-mate Piercarlo Ghinzani pre-qualified third fastest in his final Formula One event. Both Osellas lapped inside the lap record. Philippe Alliot was second fastest in the Larrousse-Lola, with the Onyx of JJ Lehto in fourth, edging out his team-mate Stefan Johansson by just under a tenth of a second. It was Johansson's eighth pre-qualifying failure of the season.

Sixth was the other Lola of Michele Alboreto, who had failed to qualify for any of the last three races of the season. Both Alliot and Alboreto left the team at the end of the season. Bernd Schneider was seventh in the Zakspeed, his fourteenth failure to pre-qualify in 1989. Roberto Moreno was eighth in his last appearance for Coloni, with Oscar Larrauri ninth for EuroBrun in his last Formula One event. Aguri Suzuki was tenth in the other Zakspeed, having failed to pre-qualify in any of the sixteen Grands Prix this season, and Zakspeed elected to pull out of Formula One at the end of the year. The AGS team struggled again with Yannick Dalmas eleventh and Gabriele Tarquini twelfth, although both drivers were staying with the team for 1990. Bringing up the rear, as he did in all six of the pre-qualifying sessions in which he participated this season, was Enrico Bertaggia in the other Coloni, who like his team-mate Moreno, left the Italian team at the end of the season.

=== Pre-qualifying classification ===
| Pos | No | Driver | Constructor | Time | Gap |
|---|---|---|---|---|---|
| 1 | 17 | (Italy) Nicola Larini | Osella-Ford | 1:18.379 | |
| 2 | 30 | (France) Philippe Alliot | Lola-Lamborghini | 1:18.523 | +0.144 |
| 3 | 18 | (Italy) Piercarlo Ghinzani | Osella-Ford | 1:19.153 | +0.774 |
| 4 | 37 | (Finland) JJ Lehto | Onyx-Ford | 1:19.442 | +1.063 |
| 5 | 36 | (Sweden) Stefan Johansson | Onyx-Ford | 1:19.539 | +1.160 |
| 6 | 29 | (Italy) Michele Alboreto | Lola-Lamborghini | 1:20.129 | +1.750 |
| 7 | 34 | (West Germany) Bernd Schneider | Zakspeed-Yamaha | 1:20.179 | +1.800 |
| 8 | 31 | (Brazil) Roberto Moreno | Coloni-Ford | 1:20.183 | +1.804 |
| 9 | 33 | (Argentina) Oscar Larrauri | EuroBrun-Judd | 1:20.750 | +2.371 |
| 10 | 35 | (Japan) Aguri Suzuki | Zakspeed-Yamaha | 1:21.012 | +2.633 |
| 11 | 41 | (France) Yannick Dalmas | AGS-Ford | 1:21.022 | +2.643 |
| 12 | 40 | (Italy) Gabriele Tarquini | AGS-Ford | 1:21.600 | +3.221 |
| 13 | 32 | (Italy) Enrico Bertaggia | Coloni-Ford | 1:24.081 | +5.702 |

=== Qualifying report ===
Friday qualifying saw Prost pip Senna to pole, with Thierry Boutsen less than a tenth of a second behind Senna in third. Pierluigi Martini also continued his late season qualifying form with fourth in his Pirelli-shod Minardi. 4th–9th were filled with Italians with Japanese Grand Prix winner Alessandro Nannini fifth, Riccardo Patrese sixth, Stefano Modena seventh, followed by the two Dallaras of Andrea de Cesaris ahead of his teammate Alex Caffi. British driver Martin Brundle was 10th. Ferrari were struggling, with Berger 11th in his last race for the team before joining McLaren, and Nigel Mansell in 16th, neither driver able to find handling balance with their V12 Ferrari 640s.

Saturday was cooler, and Senna set a time below 1:17s, to take pole overall for the race. Prost did not improve and settled for 2nd, while Martini beat Nannini to third by just one tenth. The two Williams-Renaults were fifth and sixth with both drivers complaining of traffic on their runs, while Nigel Mansell was doing much better to qualify seventh going a second faster than he did on Friday while Berger fell to 14th. Berger was unable to better his Friday time as his car experienced engine failure on the track. He was forced to use Mansell's race car for his qualifying run which was halted when the on-board fire extinguisher was triggered (Berger could not use the spare Ferrari as it reportedly had a development engine planned for 1990 and it was strictly for Mansell's use only). The Dallaras were 9th and 10th on the grid with Nicola Larini in the Osella in his (and the team's) highest qualifying result in 11th.

Only 24 seconds before the end of the final qualifying session, Eddie Cheever in his Arrows-Ford caused the red flag to be shown when he heavily crashed his car at the entrance to the pit straight directly opposite the pits. Television broadcasts showed a driver's eye view of the accident, as the Arrows of Cheever and Derek Warwick were carrying forward-facing cameras for the weekend. Coming out of the final hairpin onto pit straight, Cheever ran wide over the curbing and hit the concrete wall that protected the grandstand from the cars, severely damaging the left front and rear of the car and leaving a large pool of oil on the racing surface as the car came to rest lying across the middle of the track. Cheever himself was unharmed; after he threw his steering wheel away in disgust he climbed from the car, ran across the track and jumped the wall into the pits.

The four that failed to qualify were Jonathan Palmer in his Tyrrell, in what proved to be his last Grand Prix before becoming a pit lane reporter for the BBC in 1990, Luis Pérez-Sala in the Minardi, who was significantly slower than teammate Martini in his last Grand Prix, and the two Rials of Bertrand Gachot and Pierre-Henri Raphanel, who were two seconds slower than Sala. Despite a fourth for Christian Danner at the US Grand Prix, it was not enough to save the team for next season. Raphanel would also depart Formula 1 having only qualified for one race, while Gachot secured a drive for Coloni in 1990.

=== Qualifying classification ===
| Pos | No | Driver | Constructor | Q1 | Q2 | Gap |
|---|---|---|---|---|---|---|
| 1 | 1 | (Brazil) Ayrton Senna | McLaren-Honda | 1:17.712 | 1:16.665 | |
| 2 | 2 | (France) Alain Prost | McLaren-Honda | 1:17.403 | 1:17.624 | +0.738 |
| 3 | 23 | (Italy) Pierluigi Martini | Minardi-Ford | 1:18.043 | 1:17.623 | +0.958 |
| 4 | 19 | (Italy) Alessandro Nannini | Benetton-Ford | 1:18.271 | 1:17.762 | +1.097 |
| 5 | 5 | (Belgium) Thierry Boutsen | Williams-Renault | 1:17.791 | 1:18.586 | +1.126 |
| 6 | 6 | (Italy) Riccardo Patrese | Williams-Renault | 1:18.636 | 1:17.827 | +1.162 |
| 7 | 27 | (United Kingdom) Nigel Mansell | Ferrari | 1:19.525 | 1:18.313 | +1.648 |
| 8 | 8 | (Italy) Stefano Modena | Brabham-Judd | 1:18.750 | 1:20.076 | +2.085 |
| 9 | 22 | (Italy) Andrea de Cesaris | Dallara-Ford | 1:18.828 | 1:19.487 | +2.163 |
| 10 | 21 | (Italy) Alex Caffi | Dallara-Ford | 1:18.857 | 1:18.899 | +2.192 |
| 11 | 17 | (Italy) Nicola Larini | Osella-Ford | 1:19.305 | 1:19.110 | +2.445 |
| 12 | 7 | (United Kingdom) Martin Brundle | Brabham-Judd | 1:19.136 | 1:19.428 | +2.471 |
| 13 | 20 | (Italy) Emanuele Pirro | Benetton-Ford | 1:19.710 | 1:19.217 | +2.552 |
| 14 | 28 | (Austria) Gerhard Berger | Ferrari | 1:19.238 | 1:20.615 | +2.573 |
| 15 | 4 | (France) Jean Alesi | Tyrrell-Ford | 1:19.363 | 1:19.259 | +2.594 |
| 16 | 16 | (Italy) Ivan Capelli | March-Judd | 1:19.269 | 1:19.294 | +2.604 |
| 17 | 37 | (Finland) JJ Lehto | Onyx-Ford | 1:20.767 | 1:19.309 | +2.644 |
| 18 | 11 | (Brazil) Nelson Piquet | Lotus-Judd | 1:19.392 | 1:20.622 | +2.727 |
| 19 | 30 | (France) Philippe Alliot | Lola-Lamborghini | 1:19.568 | 1:19.579 | +2.903 |
| 20 | 9 | (United Kingdom) Derek Warwick | Arrows-Ford | 1:19.599 | 1:19.622 | +2.934 |
| 21 | 18 | (Italy) Piercarlo Ghinzani | Osella-Ford | 1:19.691 | 1:20.718 | +3.026 |
| 22 | 10 | (United States) Eddie Cheever | Arrows-Ford | 1:19.922 | 1:21.206 | +3.257 |
| 23 | 12 | (Japan) Satoru Nakajima | Lotus-Judd | 1:20.066 | 1:20.333 | +3.401 |
| 24 | 26 | (France) Olivier Grouillard | Ligier-Ford | 1:21.882 | 1:20.073 | +3.408 |
| 25 | 15 | (Brazil) Maurício Gugelmin | March-Judd | 1:20.191 | 1:20.260 | +3.526 |
| 26 | 25 | (France) René Arnoux | Ligier-Ford | 1:20.872 | 1:20.391 | +3.726 |
| 27 | 3 | (United Kingdom) Jonathan Palmer | Tyrrell-Ford | 1:20.428 | 1:20.451 | +3.763 |
| 28 | 24 | (Spain) Luis Pérez-Sala | Minardi-Ford | 1:20.633 | 1:20.866 | +3.968 |
| 29 | 39 | (Belgium) Bertrand Gachot | Rial-Ford | 1:22.267 | 1:24.913 | +5.602 |
| 30 | 38 | (France) Pierre-Henri Raphanel | Rial-Ford | 1:22.305 | 1:22.391 | +5.640 |

== Race ==
=== Pre-race ===
Sunday was cool and overcast with rain being forecast for later in the day. After the morning warm-up session, the rain arrived just before the second Group A touring car support race of the weekend, and an extra 30-minute session (already organised for such an occasion) was arranged for the teams to set their cars up for what would be a wet race as the weather forecast had the rain staying around all day. During the extra session a lot of drivers aquaplaned off the circuit, some on their out lap, notably Prost and Berger. Senna spun his car a full 360° over the high curb on the outside of Brewery Bend, his car emerged pointing in the right direction and he continued undamaged down the Brabham Straight. Prost and Berger, along with Nelson Piquet, Thierry Boutsen, Riccardo Patrese and Alessandro Nannini discussed not racing over safety concerns with Prost, Berger and Piquet in particular telling television interviewer Barry Sheene and a worldwide television audience that the conditions were too bad to race in. The drivers' argument was that the race start should be delayed as the rain was forecast to ease within a couple of hours.

An hour before the race the conditions significantly worsened, and Prost and Berger's proposal was being seriously considered by a lot of drivers. World Champion Senna wanted to start despite the appalling conditions. With McLaren's court action over his disqualification in Japan still pending, the championship was technically not yet settled and to keep any chance of retaining his World Drivers' Championship he had to win the race. Senna later privately confessed to a friend that he thought it was too dangerous to race but that he was a contracted driver and racing was what he was paid to do. He also said that championship or not, he believed Prost did the right thing by not taking the restart as he had nothing to gain by driving in such conditions. The drivers' arguments failed and it was agreed the race would go ahead. It also emerged that while still in his car Senna had been approached by Boutsen to get his thoughts about starting. Senna reportedly agreed the race should not go ahead, but he was bound by both his contract and the championship situation to start.

=== Race report ===
The green lights were on before the grid had even properly lined up, causing some confusion at the back (Eddie Cheever had been slow away on the warmup lap and was only just coming off the Brabham Straight as the lights went green). Prost passed Senna at the start, but into the first corner, Senna braked significantly later, and re-took the lead, nearly hitting the Frenchman in the process. Further back, Martini fishtailed on his Pirelli rain tyres which were considered to not be as good as the Goodyear-shod cars around him, and Nannini overtook him for third. Other drivers who made good starts were de Cesaris and Brundle.

On the first lap, Olivier Grouillard spun off at turn 4, nearly collecting his teammate Arnoux. A number of drivers made mistakes including Nelson Piquet and Modena. But JJ Lehto's accident just after the first chicane partially blocked the road, causing the race to be stopped. While that was happening, Prost had pulled into the pits, withdrawing because of safety, before going on to criticise the race organisers for allowing the race to have been started in the first place. Before the race had started Prost stated his intention to honour his contract and start the race, but that he would pit after one lap and retire from the race. Prost, who was known not to like racing in wet conditions for reasons of safety, remained true to his word and did not contest the restart, despite the best efforts of team boss Ron Dennis to persuade him to do otherwise.

As the cars waited on the grid, drivers argued whether the race should be restarted. The main drivers arguing for the race to be abandoned were Berger, Mansell, Patrese, Boutsen, Piquet and Nannini. Those arguing for the race to restart were Martini, Brundle, Jean Alesi (despite suffering from bronchitis) de Cesaris and Caffi. Formula One Constructors Association (FOCA) boss Bernie Ecclestone also pressed the race organisers to restart the race. Ecclestone also told Barry Sheene in an interview that he believed Prost would take the second start (due to his McLaren being at the end of pit lane, though Prost had no intention of getting back into his car), and that he had gone around the circuit in a course car and found the conditions had 'improved', though it was argued that there was a significant difference between a slow lap in a road car and a lap at speed in a Formula One car. Through it all, Senna remained silent sitting in his McLaren. Prost later told reporters that Ecclestone had told him they had cleared the puddles from the Brabham Straight which was where most of the cars were aquaplaning, though Prost did not believe him as it was still raining at the time.

At the 2nd start, Larini stalled his Osella's Ford V8 before he even made his grid slot and was pushed off the circuit by the marshals to retire from the race. Alesi started from the pit lane after his car stalled on the dummy-grid and he had to be pushed into pit lane to be restarted. At the front, Martini took advantage of the gap left by Prost's absent car to get level with Senna, but the Brazilian kept the lead by cutting across him. Everyone else kept order behind, though Nannini, despite having no one in front of him with Prost's absence, was passed by the Williams' pair only a few corners after the start.

Senna pulled away rapidly - he was almost 9 seconds in front after just the first lap, though he was also the only driver who had a clear track in front of him and was not affected by almost zero visibility. After a few laps in second place where he used better visibility and less wheelspin from his less powerful Ford V8 engine to stay ahead, Martini was passed in quick succession by both Williams' and Nannini and the trio immediately started to match Senna's now more steady rather than charging pace. They quickly left the Minardi with its inferior Pirelli wets well behind. The first retirement was Arnoux after he was pushed into a spin by Eddie Cheever and was beached on a high curb, ending his career on a low. Arnoux had actually been 2nd fastest in the wet pre-race warm-up behind Senna and had been confident of a good showing. Berger and Alliot then collided at the East Terrace bend, Berger taking out Alliot, while Derek Warwick spun into the turn 7 and 8 esses when his throttle stuck open (as seen by his onboard camera which showed Warwick lucky not to be hit by his own right front wheel after hitting the concrete wall).

Then in the space of two laps, six cars retired. Both Dallaras spun out at the same place at Brewery Bend, though de Cesaris was able to continue before spinning again later in the lap and beaching himself on a curb, while Mansell, Nannini, Piquet and Cheever all had off track excursions. However, the major accident was Senna running into the back of Brundle while lapping him and Piquet. The crash was recorded by a rear view camera mounted on the back of Brundle's Brabham, television commentator Murray Walker describing Senna's McLaren charging into Brundle as "bearing down on him like Jaws". Senna, who earlier had multiple spins on one lap before the pits hairpin (losing only 4 seconds in the process), was out with major front suspension damage after returning to the pits with his left front wheel missing, as was Brundle, and the Williams' of Boutsen and Patrese were one-two with Nannini still in third despite his off track excursion. Ivan Capelli also retired his March.

Five laps later, Mansell spun out at Stag Turn and then there was a major collision involving Piquet and Ghinzani. Piquet, who could see nothing but a grey wall of spray and as a consequence missed his braking markers, ran into the back of the braking Osella at speed at the hairpin at the end of the Brabham Straight and one of Ghinzani's rear tyres hit Piquet's helmet, though the triple World Champion was not injured. Ghinzani, who was lucky not to hit Martini, limped away from his broken Osella and Grand Prix racing having banged his ankle on the car's monocoque.

The last retirement of the race was Eddie Cheever (who as it turned out was driving in his 143rd and last Grand Prix) when he spun his Arrows down the East Terrace escape road and stalled his engine on lap 42. Cheever, who earlier in his career had gained a reputation for being a good wet weather driver, had driven much of his race with a piece of another car's front wing lodged in one of the Arrows' sidepods.

Satoru Nakajima, in one of the best drives of his career which drew praise even from those who had regularly been critical of him such as 1976 World Champion James Hunt, set the fastest lap of the race, making his way through the field and almost catching Patrese for third, but finally settling for fourth. Nakajima had spun at the chicane on the first lap of the restart and was last by a long way at the end of the first lap. His drive surprised many as he had always been known to dislike street circuits and also had no like for racing in the rain. In his live race commentary on lap 29, Hunt said "Nakajima is really being a star today... this must be the greatest moment of his life so far, certainly his finest race ever. Good for him, he's making me eat some of the criticisms I've levelled [at him] in the past, although I think at the time they were justifiable, but I'm very pleased to see him doing so well today".

Third placed qualifier Martini went steadily backwards to finally finish in sixth place, three laps down on Boutsen. Martini's race generally confirmed the view that while Pirelli's qualifying tyres were superior to the Goodyears, it was the opposite for both dry and wet weather race tyres with Goodyear holding a distinct advantage. During the middle stages of the race, Nannini, who had earlier passed a spinning Patrese for second place, was able to make significant inroads into Boutsen's lead and got to within a second of the leading Williams. However, as seen by the television cameras, this was mainly due to his Benetton teammate Emanuele Pirro who ignored flags telling him he was about to be lapped. Pirro held Boutsen up for just over 3 laps allowing his team leader to close the gap. Boutsen eventually managed to pass the Benetton (shaking his fist in disgust soon after), while Pirro then moved over and let Nannini through. Boutsen then proceeded to drive steadily away from his 1988 Benetton teammate with Nannini unable to respond.

After two hours, the race was declared finished with 70 laps having been completed out of the scheduled 81. Boutsen won his second wet race of the season followed by Nannini. Patrese finished third with Nakajima fourth having a good last race for Lotus before joining Tyrrell in 1990. Patrese said in the post-race driver interviews that in the conditions he was only driving for third place knowing that with Mansell failing to finish, this would have allowed him to pass Mansell on points and finish a career best third in the Drivers' Championship. Pirro came home fifth in his last race for Benetton and Martini eventually came sixth, 3 laps down. The remaining survivors were the March of Maurício Gugelmin and the Brabham of Stefano Modena, both finishing outside the points.

=== Race classification ===
| Pos | No | Driver | Constructor | Laps | Time/Retired | Grid | Points |
|---|---|---|---|---|---|---|---|
| 1 | 5 | (Belgium) Thierry Boutsen | Williams-Renault | 70 | 2:00:17.421 | 5 | 9 |
| 2 | 19 | (Italy) Alessandro Nannini | Benetton-Ford | 70 | + 28.658 | 4 | 6 |
| 3 | 6 | (Italy) Riccardo Patrese | Williams-Renault | 70 | + 37.683 | 6 | 4 |
| 4 | 12 | (Japan) Satoru Nakajima | Lotus-Judd | 70 | + 42.331 | 23 | 3 |
| 5 | 20 | (Italy) Emanuele Pirro | Benetton-Ford | 68 | + 2 laps | 13 | 2 |
| 6 | 23 | (Italy) Pierluigi Martini | Minardi-Ford | 67 | + 3 laps | 3 | 1 |
| 7 | 15 | (Brazil) Maurício Gugelmin | March-Judd | 66 | + 4 laps | 25 | |
| 8 | 8 | (Italy) Stefano Modena | Brabham-Judd | 64 | + 6 laps | 8 | |
| Ret | 10 | (United States) Eddie Cheever | Arrows-Ford | 42 | Spun off | 22 | |
| Ret | 37 | (Finland) JJ Lehto | Onyx-Ford | 27 | Electrical | 17 | |
| Ret | 26 | (France) Olivier Grouillard | Ligier-Ford | 22 | Spun off | 24 | |
| Ret | 11 | (Brazil) Nelson Piquet | Lotus-Judd | 19 | Collision | 18 | |
| Ret | 18 | (Italy) Piercarlo Ghinzani | Osella-Ford | 18 | Collision | 21 | |
| Ret | 27 | (United Kingdom) Nigel Mansell | Ferrari | 17 | Spun off | 7 | |
| Ret | 1 | (Brazil) Ayrton Senna | McLaren-Honda | 13 | Collision | 1 | |
| Ret | 21 | (Italy) Alex Caffi | Dallara-Ford | 13 | Spun off | 10 | |
| Ret | 16 | (Italy) Ivan Capelli | March-Judd | 13 | Radiator | 16 | |
| Ret | 22 | (Italy) Andrea de Cesaris | Dallara-Ford | 12 | Spun off | 9 | |
| Ret | 7 | (United Kingdom) Martin Brundle | Brabham-Judd | 12 | Collision | 12 | |
| Ret | 9 | (United Kingdom) Derek Warwick | Arrows-Ford | 7 | Spun off | 20 | |
| Ret | 30 | (France) Philippe Alliot | Lola-Lamborghini | 6 | Collision | 19 | |
| Ret | 28 | (Austria) Gerhard Berger | Ferrari | 6 | Collision | 14 | |
| Ret | 4 | (France) Jean Alesi | Tyrrell-Ford | 5 | Electrical | 15 | |
| Ret | 25 | (France) René Arnoux | Ligier-Ford | 4 | Collision | 26 | |
| Ret | 2 | (France) Alain Prost | McLaren-Honda | 0 | Withdrew | 2 | |
| Ret | 17 | (Italy) Nicola Larini | Osella-Ford | 0 | Electrical | 11 | |
| DNQ | 3 | (United Kingdom) Jonathan Palmer | Tyrrell-Ford | | | | |
| DNQ | 24 | (Spain) Luis Pérez-Sala | Minardi-Ford | | | | |
| DNQ | 39 | (Belgium) Bertrand Gachot | Rial-Ford | | | | |
| DNQ | 38 | (France) Pierre-Henri Raphanel | Rial-Ford | | | | |
| DNPQ | 36 | (Sweden) Stefan Johansson | Onyx-Ford | | | | |
| DNPQ | 29 | (Italy) Michele Alboreto | Lola-Lamborghini | | | | |
| DNPQ | 34 | (West Germany) Bernd Schneider | Zakspeed-Yamaha | | | | |
| DNPQ | 31 | (Brazil) Roberto Moreno | Coloni-Ford | | | | |
| DNPQ | 33 | (Argentina) Oscar Larrauri | EuroBrun-Judd | | | | |
| DNPQ | 35 | (Japan) Aguri Suzuki | Zakspeed-Yamaha | | | | |
| DNPQ | 41 | (France) Yannick Dalmas | AGS-Ford | | | | |
| DNPQ | 40 | (Italy) Gabriele Tarquini | AGS-Ford | | | | |
| DNPQ | 32 | (Italy) Enrico Bertaggia | Coloni-Ford | | | | |

== Championship standings after the race ==
- **Bold text** indicates World Champions.

Drivers' Championship standings

| Pos | Driver | Points |
|---|---|---|
| 1 | (France) **Alain Prost** | 76 (81) |
| 2 | (Brazil) Ayrton Senna | 60 |
| 3 | (Italy) Riccardo Patrese | 40 |
| 4 | (United Kingdom) Nigel Mansell | 38 |
| 5 | (Belgium) Thierry Boutsen | 37 |

Constructors' Championship standings

| Pos | Constructor | Points |
|---|---|---|
| 1 | (United Kingdom) **McLaren-Honda** | 141 |
| 2 | (United Kingdom) Williams-Renault | 77 |
| 3 | (Italy) Ferrari | 59 |
| 4 | (United Kingdom) Benetton-Ford | 39 |
| 5 | (United Kingdom) Tyrrell-Ford | 16 |

- Note: Only the top five positions are included for both sets of standings. Drivers could only count their best 11 results; numbers without parentheses are points counting towards the Drivers' Championship, while numbers in parentheses are total points scored.

| Previous race: 1989 Japanese Grand Prix | FIA Formula One World Championship; 1989 season | Next race: 1990 United States Grand Prix |
| Previous race: 1988 Australian Grand Prix | Australian Grand Prix | Next race: 1990 Australian Grand Prix |
