= Venturi LC92 =

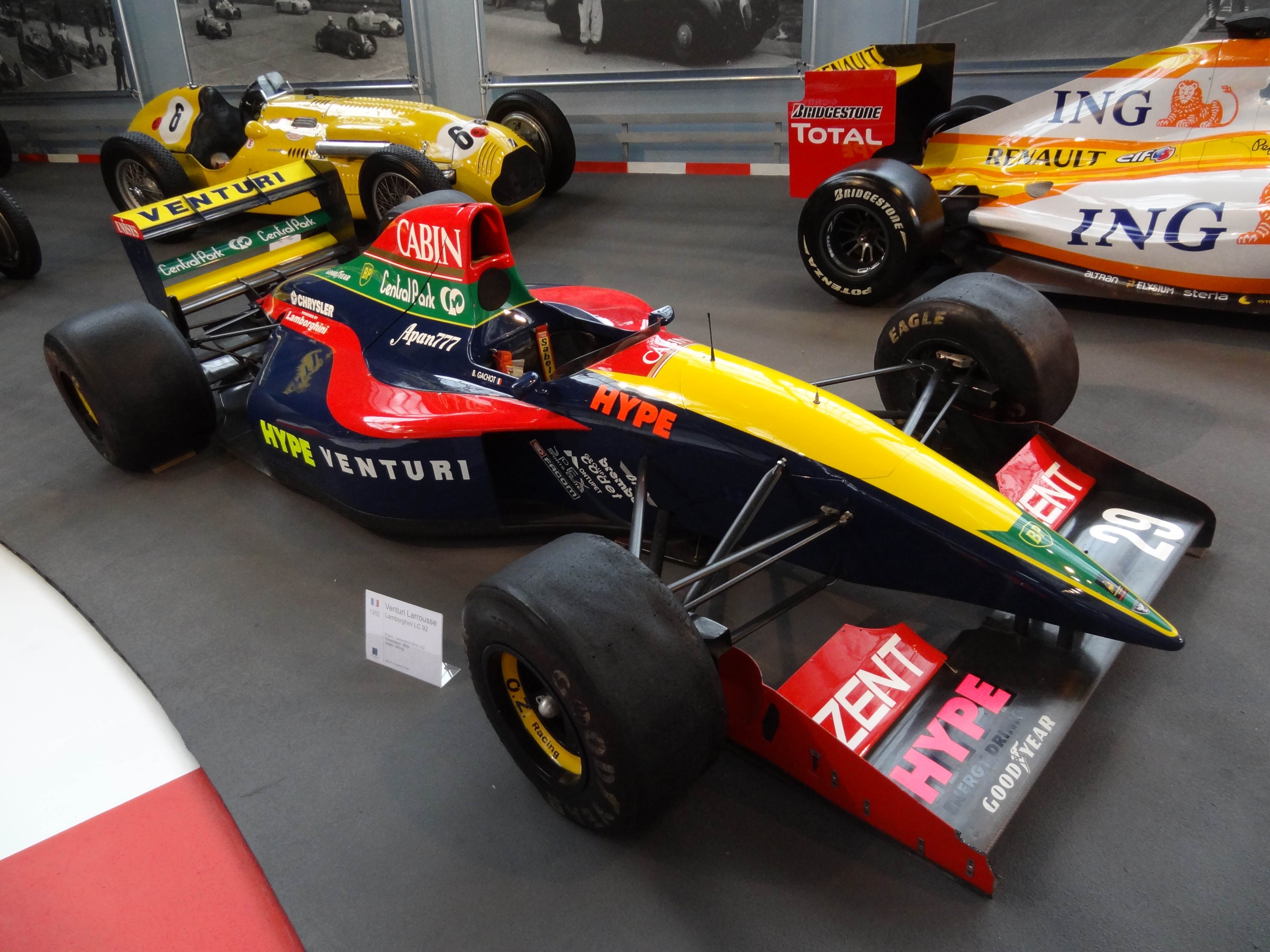
- Category: Formula One
- Constructor: Fomet
- Designers: Robin Herd (technical); Michel Têtu (design); Tino Belli (aerodynamics)
- Predecessor: Lola LC91
- Successor: Larrousse LH93

Technical specifications
- Chassis: carbon fibre monocoque
- Suspension (front): Eibach dampers with pushrods
- Suspension (rear): Eibach dampers with pushrods
- Axle track: 1,800 mm (70.9 in)/1,680 mm (66.1 in) front/rear
- Wheelbase: 2,890 mm (113.8 in)
- Engine: Lamborghini LE3512 3,493 cc (213.2 cu in) V12, naturally aspirated
- Transmission: 6-speed sequential
- Fuel: BP
- Tyres: Goodyear

Competition history
- Notable entrants: Venturi Larrousse
- Notable drivers: 29. (France) Bertrand Gachot; 30. (Japan) Ukyo Katayama
- Debut: 1992 South African Grand Prix
Entries	Races	Wins	Poles	F/Laps
16	16	0	0	0

The Venturi LC92 (also known as the Venturi Larrousse LC92 or the Larrousse LC92) was a Formula One racing car designed by Robin Herd, Michel Têtu and Tino Belli for the 1992 Formula One season.

Built to replace the Lola LC91 used in the previous season, after Larrousse had ended their agreement with Lola, the LC92 used a 3.5-litre Lamborghini 3512 V12 engine. It was the first car that Larrousse had built since Venturi had bought a controlling stake in the team, with Bertrand Gachot and Ukyo Katayama being selected to drive the car. Although the LC92 finished more races than its predecessor, it was no quicker, and Gachot scored the team's only point of the season at the 1992 Monaco Grand Prix. After Venturi sold their stake in Larrousse at the end of the season, the LC92 was replaced by the Larrousse LH93, which was marginally more successful.

== Design and development ==
Following the end of the 1991 Formula One season, the Larrousse team had been declared bankrupt, and former partners Brian Hart and Lola, the latter of whom had built Larrousse's 1991 car, the LC91, ended their contracts with the team due to the large sums of money they were owed. In order to keep his team going, team boss Gérard Larrousse signed a deal with Venturi, and hired Robin Herd and his Fomet company to build the 1992 cars. With Herd as technical director, Michel Têtu as the designer and Tino Belli as the aerodynamicist, the car they came up with was the LC92, which bore Venturi's name. The team did a deal with Lamborghini to use the firm's 3512 V12 engine, as they had done previously in 1989 and 1990. Bertrand Gachot was retained from the previous season, whilst Ukyo Katayama was hired to partner him. In September 1992, Venturi sold their stake in the team to Rainer Walldorf's Comstock firm. However, this deal descended into farce when it was discovered that Walldorf was actually a wanted felon called Klaus Walz. After a brief spell on the run, Walz was killed by police after a nine-hour siege in a hotel.

== Racing history ==
Both Venturi Larrousses were ready for the start of the season, which began with the 1992 South African Grand Prix; although Gachot retired with suspension damage after an accident, Katayama finished 12th. Both drivers finished the 1992 Mexican Grand Prix, with Gachot in 11th leading Katayama home. The 1992 Brazilian Grand Prix saw Gachot succumb to suspension troubles, whilst Katayama came home in ninth. The 1992 Spanish Grand Prix saw Katayama fail to qualify for the first time that season, and Gachot retire mid-race with engine failure. Things did not improve much for Venturi Larrousse at the 1992 San Marino Grand Prix, as both drivers span out within eight laps of each other. Gachot would score Venturi Larrousse's first point of the season at the 1992 Monaco Grand Prix, where he came home sixth; a lap down on the leaders, but ahead of six other finishers. By contrast, Katayama had failed to even pre-qualify for the race. This would prove to be the high point of Venturi Larrousse's season; the next three races saw both drivers either disqualified or retire each time. It was not until the 1992 German Grand Prix that a LC92 finished another race; Katayama crashed out on lap eight, but Gachot came home 14th. After a double retirement at the 1992 Hungarian Grand Prix, both cars were classified at the 1992 Belgian Grand Prix; however, they were the last two classified, and Katayama had spun out on lap 40. Both cars retired again from the 1992 Italian Grand Prix, but, as Katayama had completed 50 laps, he was classified in ninth place. Another double retirement followed at the 1992 Portuguese Grand Prix, before Katayama took 11th at the 1992 Japanese Grand Prix. Venturi Larrousse ended the season with a double retirement at the 1992 Australian Grand Prix. Their single point secured them 11th in the constructor's standings, with Gachot classified 19th in the driver's standings.

== Complete Formula One results ==
(key) (results in bold indicate pole position)

Year	Entrant	Engine(s)	Tyres	Drivers	1	2	3	4	5	6	7	8	9	10	11	12	13	14	15	16	Points	WCC
1992	Central Park Venturi Larrousse	Lamborghini 3512 V12	**G**		RSA	MEX	BRA	ESP	SMR	MON	CAN	FRA	GBR	GER	HUN	BEL	ITA	POR	JPN	AUS	**1**	**11th**
1992	Central Park Venturi Larrousse	Lamborghini 3512 V12	**G**	Bertrand Gachot	Ret	11	Ret	Ret	Ret	6	DSQ	Ret	Ret	14	Ret	18	Ret	Ret	Ret	Ret	**1**	**11th**
1992	Central Park Venturi Larrousse	Lamborghini 3512 V12	**G**	Ukyo Katayama	12	12	9	DNQ	Ret	DNPQ	Ret	Ret	Ret	Ret	Ret	17	9	Ret	11	Ret	**1**	**11th**
