= Lola LC89 =

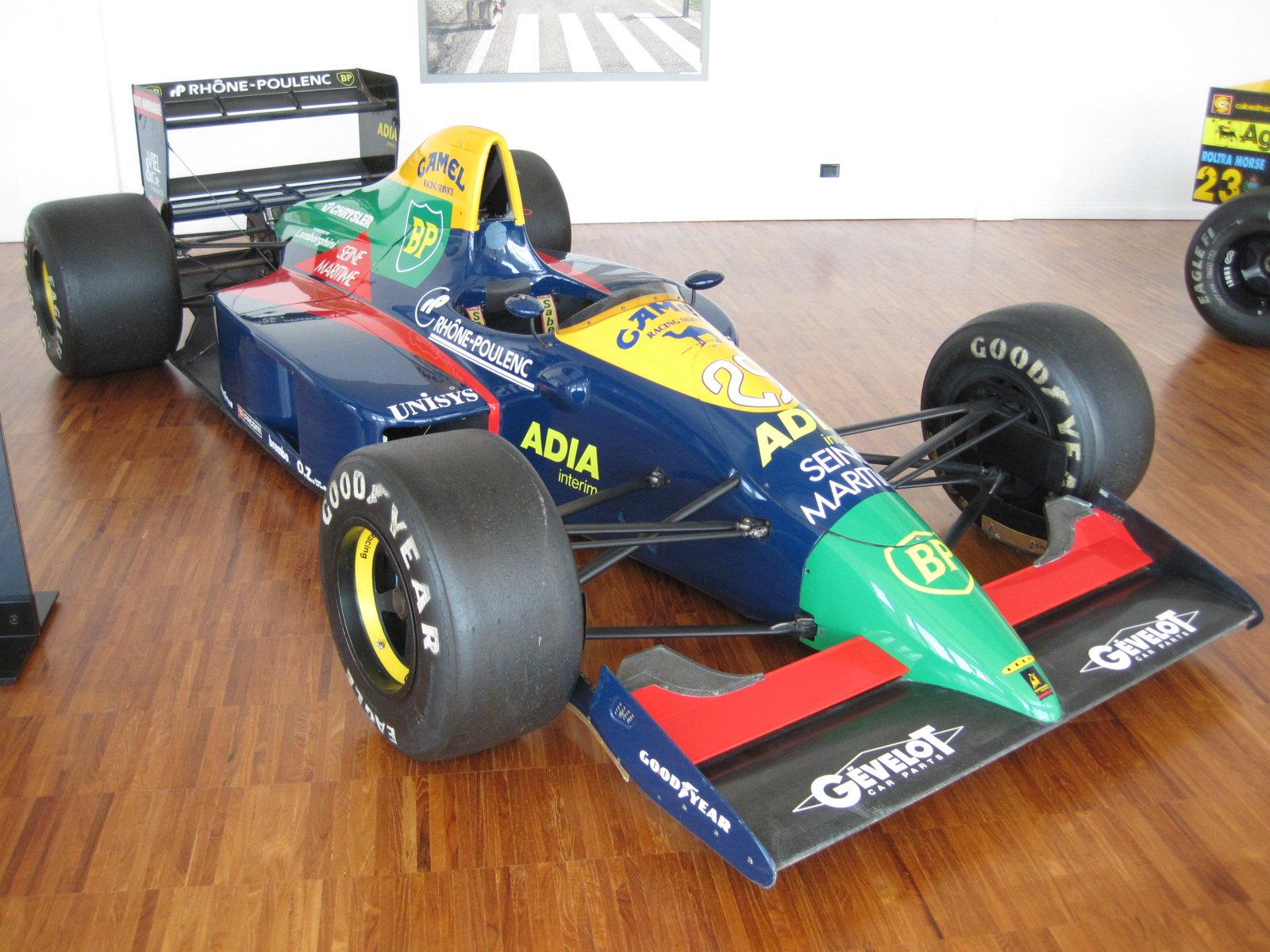
- The LC89 on display at the Museo Lamborghini
- Category: Formula One
- Constructor: Lola Cars
- Designers: Eric Broadley; Chris Murphy
- Predecessor: Lola LC88
- Successor: Lola LC90

Technical specifications
- Chassis: Carbon fibre monocoque
- Suspension (front): Double wishbones, pushrod, twin spring / dampers
- Suspension (rear): Double wishbones, pushrod, twin spring / dampers
- Engine: Lamborghini LE3512, 3,493 cc (213.2 cu in), 80° V12, NA, Mid-engine, longitudinally mounted
- Transmission: Lola 6-speed manual
- Fuel: BP
- Tyres: Goodyear

Competition history
- Notable entrants: Larrousse & Calmels; ESPO Larrousse F1
- Notable drivers: 29. (France) Yannick Dalmas; 29. (France) Éric Bernard; 29. (Italy) Michele Alboreto; 30. (France) Philippe Alliot; 30. (Japan) Aguri Suzuki
- Debut: 1989 San Marino Grand Prix
| Races | Wins | Poles | F/Laps |
|---|---|---|---|
| 16 | 0 | 0 | 0 |
- Constructors' Championships: 0
- Drivers' Championships: 0

The Lola LC89 is a Formula One car designed by Lola founder Eric Broadley and used in the 1989 Formula One season by the Larrousse team. It was powered by the 3.5-litre Lamborghini 3512 V12 engine designed by former Ferrari designer Mauro Forghieri. Drivers of the car included Philippe Alliot, Éric Bernard, Aguri Suzuki and Michele Alboreto.

== Race history ==
The car made its debut in round two of the season, at the 1989 San Marino Grand Prix. While the aerodynamics were good and the chassis was on the pace, the Lamborghini V12 engine proved to be generally unreliable, despite its reported 600 bhp (447 kW; 608 PS). The car and engine combination would only score one point in its racing life with Alliot finishing in sixth place at the 1989 Spanish Grand Prix. Five time Grand Prix winner Alboreto failed to pre-qualify the car twice (Spain and Australia) and failed to qualify once (Japan), in his eight drives for the team in 1989. Alboreto also suffered a broken rib driving the car when he ran over a high curb during the Hungarian Grand Prix.

The chassis was updated into the LC89B for the first two races of 1990. It was replaced by the Lola LC90 from the 1990 San Marino Grand Prix.

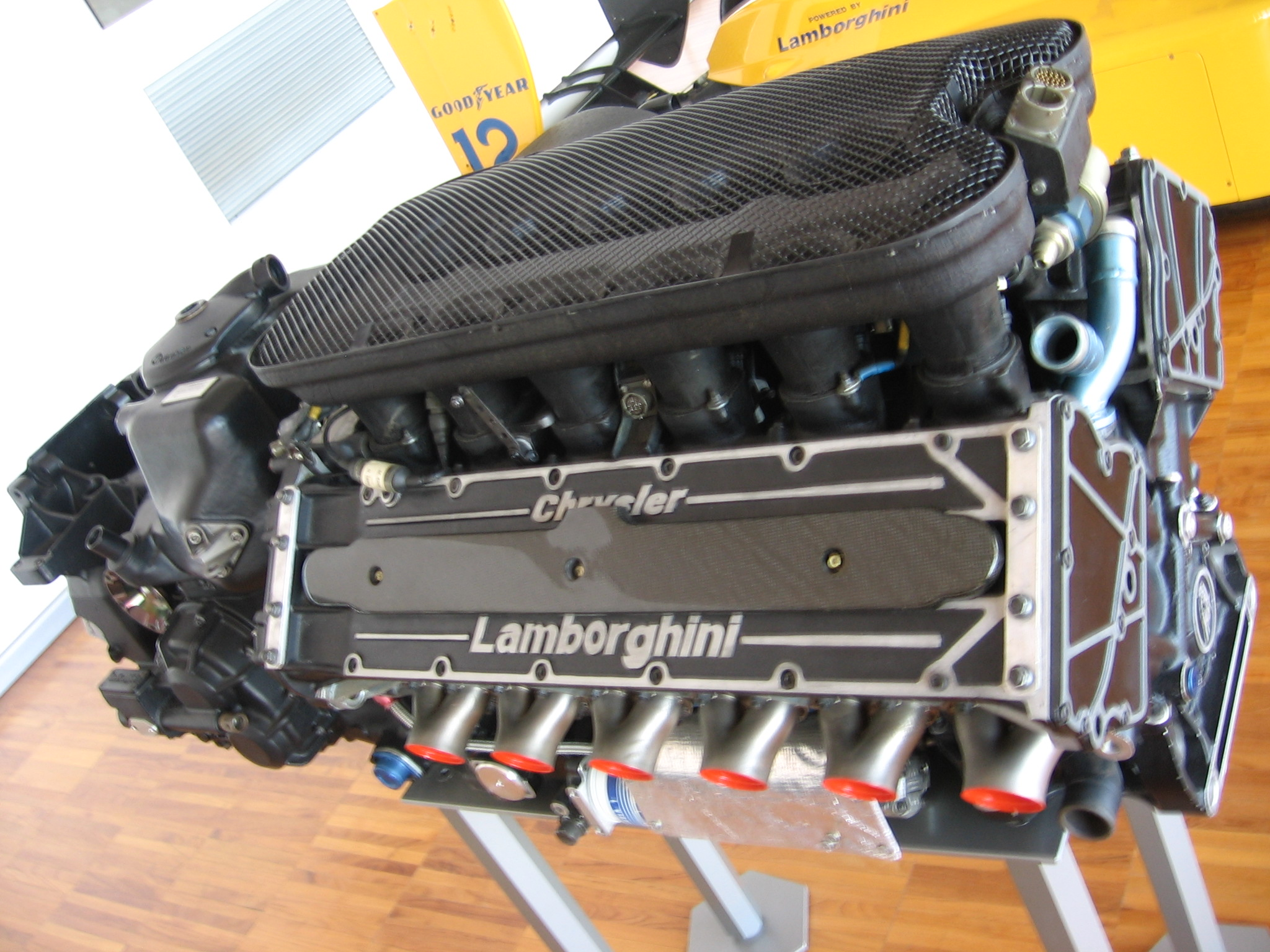
Lamborghinis V12 engine as used by the Larrousse team in 1989.

== Complete Formula One results ==
(key)

| Year | Entrant | Chassis | Engine | Tyres | Drivers | 1 | 2 | 3 | 4 | 5 | 6 | 7 | 8 | 9 | 10 | 11 | 12 | 13 | 14 | 15 | 16 | Pts. | WCC |
|---|---|---|---|---|---|---|---|---|---|---|---|---|---|---|---|---|---|---|---|---|---|---|---|
| 1989 | Larrousse & Calmels | LC89 | Lamborghini 3512; V12 | G | | BRA | SMR | MON | MEX | USA | CAN | FRA | GBR | GER | HUN | BEL | ITA | POR | ESP | JPN | AUS | 1 | 16th |
| 1989 | Larrousse & Calmels | LC89 | Lamborghini 3512; V12 | G | Philippe Alliot | | Ret | Ret | NC | Ret | Ret | Ret | Ret | Ret | DNPQ | 16 | Ret | 9 | 6 | Ret | Ret | 1 | 16th |
| 1989 | Larrousse & Calmels | LC89 | Lamborghini 3512; V12 | G | Yannick Dalmas | | Ret | DNQ | DNQ | DNQ | DNQ | | | | | | | | | | | 1 | 16th |
| 1989 | Larrousse & Calmels | LC89 | Lamborghini 3512; V12 | G | Éric Bernard | | | | | | | 11 | Ret | | | | | | | | | 1 | 16th |
| 1989 | Larrousse & Calmels | LC89 | Lamborghini 3512; V12 | G | Michele Alboreto | | | | | | | | | Ret | Ret | Ret | Ret | 11 | DNPQ | DNQ | DNPQ | 1 | 16th |
| 1990 | ESPO Larrousse F1 | LC89B | Lamborghini 3512; V12 | G | | USA | BRA | SMR | MON | CAN | MEX | FRA | GBR | GER | HUN | BEL | ITA | POR | ESP | JPN | AUS | 11* | 6th |
| 1990 | ESPO Larrousse F1 | LC89B | Lamborghini 3512; V12 | G | Éric Bernard | 8 | Ret | | | | | | | | | | | | | | | 11* | 6th |
| 1990 | ESPO Larrousse F1 | LC89B | Lamborghini 3512; V12 | G | Aguri Suzuki | Ret | Ret | | | | | | | | | | | | | | | 11* | 6th |

* All 1990 points scored using Lola LC90; results published in 1991 FIA Yearbook of Automobile Sport credited the constructor results to "Larrousse" rather than "Lola".
