= Éric Bernard =

French racing driver (born 1964)

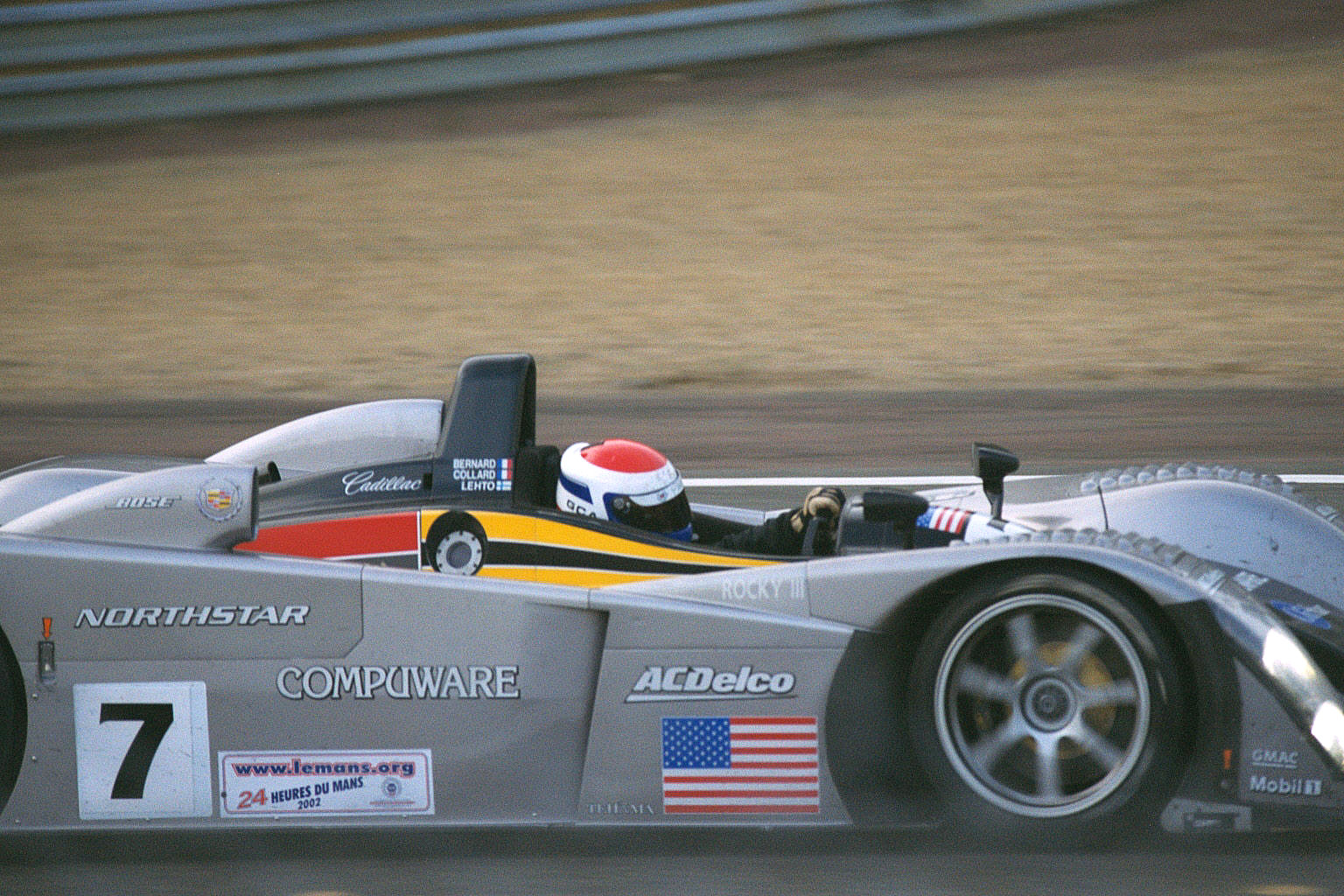
- Bernard in 2002
- Born: 24 August 1964 (age 62); Martigues, France
- Relatives: Charles Pic (godson)

Formula One World Championship career
- Nationality: (France) French
- Active years: 1989–1991, 1994
- Team(s): Larrousse, Ligier, Lotus
- Entries: 47 (45 starts)
- Championships: 0
- Wins: 0
- Podiums: 1
- Career points: 10
- Pole positions: 0
- Fastest laps: 0
- First entry: 1989 French Grand Prix
- Last entry: 1994 European Grand Prix

24 Hours of Le Mans career
- Years: 1995–2002
- Teams: Courage, Ennea, DAMS, Panoz, Cadillac
- Best finish: 7th (1999)
- Class wins: 0

Éric Bernard (born 24 August 1964) is a French former racing driver, who competed in Formula One between 1989 and 1994. (Note: The exact years Bernard competed in Formula One: 1989–1991, 1994.)

Born in Martigues, Bernard began competitive kart racing aged 13, winning several national titles. He graduated to Formula Renault after attending the Winfield Racing School at Paul Ricard. Bernard debuted in Formula One at the 1989 French Grand Prix for Larrousse, where he remained until 1991. He returned in 1994 with Ligier, achieving his only podium at the German Grand Prix. He made his final appearance at the European Grand Prix with Lotus. After his departure, he competed in sportscar racing, finishing runner-up in the 1999 American Le Mans Series with Panoz.

== Early career ==
Bernard was born in Martigues, near Marseille. He started karting in 1976 and in the seven years that followed, won four French titles. In 1983, he attended racing school at Paul Ricard and was one of the finalists at the Volant Elf competition. He beat Jean Alesi and Bertrand Gachot to the prize, earning himself a fully sponsored drive in Formula Renault for 1984. He finished sixth in the series, but won the following year, and entering French Formula Three in 1986. He won the series the following year, finishing in second place for the championship, behind his old rival, Alesi. In 1988, he entered Formula 3000. He drove the initial part of the season for the Ralt Team before switching to Bromley Motorsport which ran a Reynard chassis. His best finish that year was second at the Dijon-Prenois and placed ninth in the championship with 13 points. For 1989, he drove for the DAMS team, scoring one win and placing third in the championship with 25 points.

== Formula One ==
In mid-1989, Bernard was called up to the French Larrousse Formula One team for the French Grand Prix, replacing Yannick Dalmas. On his debut, he ran as high as fifth place, and was still in seventh when his Lamborghini V12 engine failed a few laps from the end (Alesi also debuted at the race for Tyrrell, running as high as second before finally finishing fourth). Bernard stood in again at the following British Grand Prix, before returning to his Formula 3000 commitments with DAMS.

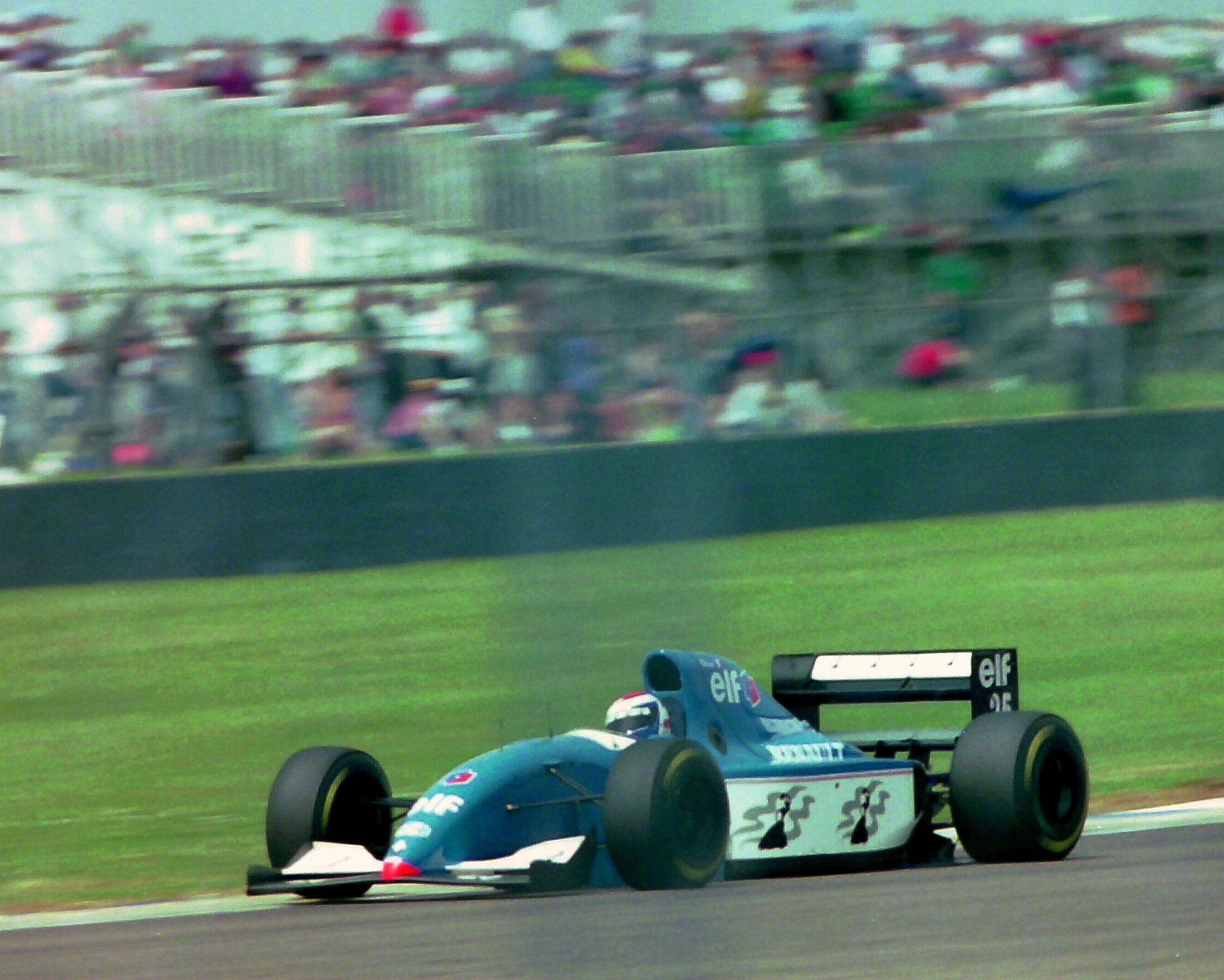
Bernard driving for Ligier at the 1994 British Grand Prix.

Bernard was rewarded with a full-season drive for Larrousse in 1990. He took his first point for sixth place at the Monaco Grand Prix, and his best result came at Silverstone in the British Grand Prix, where he took fourth place. He elected to stay on at Larrousse for the 1991 season, but the team were in trouble, losing their Lamborghini engines to the quasi-works Modena team, having their 1990 points stripped by the FIA, and also losing sponsors. Bernard took sixth place in the Mexican Grand Prix, which was the last points finish for Larrousse with Lola Cars, but slipped back down the field, failing to qualify for the first time in his career at the Portuguese Grand Prix - partially due to a bereavement. Worse was to come, however, when Bernard broke his leg in the first practice session for the Japanese Grand Prix.

Bernard fought back to fitness, and for the 1993 season his old sponsors Elf managed to get him into a test driver seat for the Ligier team. The two-year testing contract paid off, as a team backer was jailed for fraud before the 1994 season, and the reduced budget saw Bernard promoted to a race seat, alongside rookie Olivier Panis. Sadly for Bernard, Panis largely outpaced him, and the team's Renault V10 engine was counterweighted by the team using a "B"-spec version of the 1993 JS39 chassis - by this time a very unusual practice in Formula One which greatly harmed competitiveness. Bernard took third place in the high-attrition German Grand Prix, but by the European Grand Prix, he was dropped in order to accommodate Johnny Herbert. He was engaged by Herbert's previous team, Team Lotus, to fill the seat at the European GP, but it was to be his last F1 drive, with Mika Salo taking over later in the season. For 1995, he was linked to a return to Larrousse, but the team folded before the season began.

== Sportscars ==
Bernard moved to sportscars, enjoying considerable success in GT and ALMS series.

== Racing record ==
=== Career summary ===
Season	Series	Team	Races	Wins	Poles	F/Laps	Podiums	Points	Position
1984	Championnat de France Formule Renault Turbo	?	11	0	0	0	1	55	7th
1985	Championnat de France Formule Renault Turbo	Ecurie Elf	12	6	4	8	9	140	**1st**
1986	French Formula Three	Ecurie Elf	10	0	0	0	2	48	5th
1986	Italian Formula Three	Ecurie Elf	1	0	0	0	0	0	NC
1987	French Formula Three	Ecurie Elf	13	2	3	7	9	129	**2nd**
1987	Macau Grand Prix	Ecurie Elf	1	0	0	0	0	N/A	8th
1988	International Formula 3000	Bromley Motorsport	5	0	0	0	1	13	9th
1988	International Formula 3000	Ralt Racing	4	0	0	0	0	13	9th
1989	International Formula 3000	DAMS	10	1	2	3	3	25	**3rd**
1989	Formula One	Equipe Larrousse	2	0	0	0	0	0	NC
1990	Formula One	Espo Larrousse F1	16	0	0	0	0	5	13th
1991	Formula One	Larrousse F1	13	0	0	0	0	1	18th
1994	Formula One	Ligier Gitanes Blondes	13	0	0	0	1	4	18th
1994	Formula One	Team Lotus	1	0	0	0	0	4	18th
1995	24 Hours of Le Mans	Courage Compétition	1	0	0	0	0	N/A	DNF
1996	BPR Global GT Series	Ennea/Igol	10	0	0	0	3	155	8th
1996	24 Hours of Le Mans	Ennea SRL Igol	1	0	0	0	0	N/A	DNF
1997	FIA GT Championship	DAMS Panoz	8	0	0	0	0	0	NC
1997	24 Hours of Le Mans	Société DAMS	1	0	0	0	0	N/A	DNF
1998	FIA GT Championship	DAMS	8	0	0	0	2	15	11th
1998	United States Road Racing Championship	Panoz-Visteon Racing	5	0	1	0	2	8	4th
1998	24 Hours of Le Mans	Panoz Motor Sports	1	0	0	0	0	N/A	DNF
1999	American Le Mans Series	Panoz Motor Sports	8	2	1	2	4	135	**2nd**
1999	Sports Racing World Cup	DAMS	5	3	1	2	3	60	9th
1999	24 Hours of Le Mans	Panoz Motor Sports	1	0	0	0	0	N/A	7th
2000	American Le Mans Series	Motorola-DAMS	5	0	0	0	0	66	20th
2000	Sports Racing World Cup	Motorola-DAMS	3	0	0	0	0	3	37th
2000	24 Hours of Le Mans	DAMS	1	0	0	0	0	N/A	19th
2001	24 Hours of Le Mans	DAMS	1	0	0	0	0	N/A	DNF
2002	American Le Mans Series	Team Cadillac	6	0	0	0	0	78	18th
2002	24 Hours of Le Mans	Team Cadillac	1	0	0	0	0	N/A	12th

=== Complete International Formula 3000 results ===
(key) (Races in bold indicate pole position; races in italics indicate fastest lap.)

Year	Entrant	Chassis	Engine	1	2	3	4	5	6	7	8	9	10	11	Pos	Points
1988	Team Ralt	Ralt RT22	Judd	JER; 6	VAL; 10	PAU; 4	SIL; 11	MNZ; DNQ	PER						9th	13
1988	Bromley Motorsport	Reynard 88D	Cosworth							BRH; DSQ	BIR; DSQ	BUG; Ret	ZOL; 4	DIJ; 2	9th	13
1989	DAMS	Lola T89/50	Mugen Honda	SIL; Ret	VAL; Ret	PAU; Ret	**JER**; 1	PER; Ret	BRH; 4	BIR; 4	SPA; Ret	**BUG**; 3	**DIJ**; 2		**3rd**	**25**

=== Complete Formula One results ===
(key)

Year	Entrant	Chassis	Engine	1	2	3	4	5	6	7	8	9	10	11	12	13	14	15	16	WDC	Points
1989	Equipe Larrousse	Lola LC89	Lamborghini V12	BRA	SMR	MON	MEX	USA	CAN	FRA; 11	GBR; Ret	GER	HUN	BEL	ITA	POR	ESP	JPN	AUS	NC	0
1990	Espo Larrousse F1	Lola LC89B	Lamborghini V12	USA; 8	BRA; Ret															13th	5
1990	Espo Larrousse F1	Lola LC90	Lamborghini V12			SMR; 13	MON; 6	CAN; 9	MEX; Ret	FRA; 8	GBR; 4	GER; Ret	HUN; 6	BEL; 9	ITA; Ret	POR; Ret	ESP; Ret	JPN; Ret	AUS; Ret	13th	5
1991	Larrousse F1	Larrousse Lola LC91	Cosworth V8	USA; Ret	BRA; Ret	SMR; Ret	MON; 9	CAN; Ret	MEX; 6	FRA; Ret	GBR; Ret	GER; Ret	HUN; Ret	BEL; Ret	ITA; Ret	POR; DNQ	ESP; Ret	JPN; DNQ	AUS	18th	1
1994	Ligier Gitanes Blondes	Ligier JS39B	Renault V10	BRA; Ret	PAC; 10	SMR; 12	MON; Ret	ESP; 8	CAN; 13	FRA; Ret	GBR; 13	GER; 3	HUN; 10	BEL; 10	ITA; 7	POR; 10				18th	4
1994	Team Lotus	Lotus 109	Mugen Honda V10														EUR; 18	JPN	AUS	18th	4

=== Complete 24 Hours of Le Mans results ===
Year	Team	Co-Drivers	Car	Class	Laps	Pos.	Class Pos.
1995	(France) Courage Compétition	(France) Henri Pescarolo (France) Franck Lagorce	Courage C41	WSC	26	DNF	DNF
1996	(Italy) Ennea SRL Igol	(France) Jean-Marc Gounon (France) Paul Belmondo	Ferrari F40 GTE	LMGT1	40	DNF	DNF
1997	(France) Société DAMS	(France) Franck Lagorce (France) Jean-Christophe Boullion	Panoz GTR-1	LMGT1	149	DNF	DNF
1998	(United States) Panoz Motor Sports	(France) Christophe Tinseau (United States) Johnny O'Connell	Panoz GTR-1	LMGT1	236	DNF	DNF
1999	(United States) Panoz Motor Sports	(Australia) David Brabham (United States) Butch Leitzinger	Panoz LMP-1 Roadster-S	LMP	336	7th	6th
2000	(France) DAMS	(France) Emmanuel Collard (France) Franck Montagny	Cadillac Northstar LMP	LMP900	300	19th	9th
2001	(France) DAMS	(France) Emmanuel Collard (Belgium) Marc Goossens	Cadillac Northstar LMP01	LMP900	56	DNF	DNF
2002	(United States) Team Cadillac	(France) Emmanuel Collard (Finland) JJ Lehto	Cadillac Northstar LMP02	LMP900	334	12th	10th

=== Complete FIA GT Championship results ===
(key) (Races in bold indicate pole position) (Races in italics indicate fastest lap)

Year	Team	Class	Car	Engine	1	2	3	4	5	6	7	8	9	10	11	Pos.	Points
1997	DAMS Panoz	GT1	Panoz Esperante GTR-1	Ford-Roush 6.0 L V8	HOC; Ret	SIL; Ret	HEL	NÜR; 18	SPA; Ret	A1R; 9	SUZ; Ret	DON; Ret	MUG; 7	SEB; 8	LAG; Ret	NC	0
1998	DAMS	GT1	Panoz Esperante GTR-1	Ford-Roush 6.0 L V8	OSC; 5	SIL; 8	HOC; 3	DIJ; 3	HUN; 6	SUZ	DON; Ret	A1R	HOM; 6	LAG; 4		7th	15

=== Complete American Le Mans Series results ===
(key) (Races in bold indicate pole position) (Races in italics indicate fastest lap)

Year	Entrant	Class	Chassis	Engine	1	2	3	4	5	6	7	8	9	10	11	12	Rank	Points
1999	Panoz Motor Sports	LMP	Panoz Esperante GTR-1	Ford (Roush) 6.0 L V8	SEB; Ret												2nd	135
1999	Panoz Motor Sports	LMP	Panoz LMP-1 Roadster-S	Ford (Élan-Yates) 6.0 L V8		ATL; 5	MOS; 2	SON; 2	POR; 1	**PET**; 1	**LAG**; Ret	LVS; Ret					2nd	135
2000	Motorola DAMS	LMP	Cadillac Northstar LMP	Cadillac Northstar 4.0L Turbo V8	SEB; Ret	CLT	SIL; 6	NÜR; Ret	SON	MOS	TEX	POR	PET; 6	LAG	LVS	ADE; Ret	20th	66
2001	Team Cadillac	LMP900	Cadillac Northstar LMP01	Cadillac Northstar 4.0L Turbo V8	TEX	SEB	DON	JAR	SON	POR	MOS	MOH	LAG	PET; WD			NC	0
2002	Team Cadillac	LMP900	Cadillac Northstar LMP02	Cadillac Northstar 4.0L Turbo V8	SEB; Ret	SON	MID	AME	WAS; Ret	TRO	MOS; 6	LAG; Ret	MIA; 7	PET; 4			18th	78

== Notes ==
Sporting positions
Preceded by Yannick Dalmas	Championnat de France Formule Renault Turbo; Champion; 1985	Succeeded by Érik Comas
