= Lola LC91 =

- Category: Formula One
- Constructor: Lola Cars
- Designer: Eric Broadley
- Predecessor: Lola LC90
- Successor: Venturi LC92

Technical specifications
- Chassis: Carbon fibre monocoque
- Suspension (front): Double wishbones, pushrod, twin spring / dampers
- Suspension (rear): Double wishbones, pushrod, twin spring / dampers
- Axle track: Front: 1,810 mm (71.3 in); Rear: 1,620 mm (63.8 in)
- Wheelbase: 2,850 mm (112.2 in)
- Engine: Ford DFR, 90° V8, 3,493 cc (213.2 cu in), NA, Mid-engine, longitudinally mounted
- Transmission: Lola 6-speed manual
- Fuel: BP
- Lubricants: BP
- Tyres: Goodyear

Competition history
- Notable entrants: Larrousse F1
- Notable drivers: 29. (France) Éric Bernard; 29. (Belgium) Bertrand Gachot; 30. (Japan) Aguri Suzuki
- Debut: 1991 United States Grand Prix
Races	Wins	Poles	F/Laps
16	0	0	0
- Constructors' Championships: 0
- Drivers' Championships: 0

The Lola LC91 was a Formula One car designed by Eric Broadley for use in the 1991 Formula One season by the Larrousse team. It was powered by the 3.5L Ford DFR V8. The car was driven by Japanese driver Aguri Suzuki and Frenchman Éric Bernard.

== Race history ==
The LC91 made its debut at the 1991 United States Grand Prix driven by Éric Bernard and Aguri Suzuki. Bernard qualified 19th and Suzuki 21st. In the race, Bernard's engine blew and Suzuki finished 6th. At the Brazilian Grand Prix Bernard qualified 11th and Suzuki 17th, but the Japanese driver did not start the race due to fuel pump failure and the Frenchman retired with a broken radiator. The San Marino Grand Prix saw Bernard qualify 17th and Suzuki 20th. However, Suzuki spun off in the wet conditions and retired and the Frenchman retired when his engine blew. At Monaco Bernard qualified 21st and Suzuki 19th, but the Japanese driver's engine failed and the Frenchman finished ninth. The Canadian Grand Prix saw Bernard qualify 19th and Suzuki 22nd, but Suzuki retired when a fuel leak caused a fire and Bernard retired with a broken gearbox.

The Mexican Grand Prix saw Bernard qualify 18th and Suzuki 19th, But the latter retired with a broken gearbox. The French Grand Prix saw Bernard qualify 22nd and Suzuki 23rd, transmission failure took them both out. The British Grand Prix saw Bernard qualify 22nd and Suzuki 23rd, but the Japanese driver retired after colliding With Jean Alesi's Ferrari and the Frenchman retired with transmission failure. The German Grand Prix saw Bernard qualify 25th and Suzuki 22nd, but the Japanese driver retired when his engine blew and the Frenchman retired with transmission failure. The Hungarian Grand Prix saw Bernard qualify 21st and Suzuki 22nd, but both retired with engine failure.

At the Belgian Grand Prix Suzuki failed to qualify; Bernard qualified 20th and retired with a broken gearbox. At Monza Suzuki again failed to qualify but Bernard started 24th and retired with engine failure. The Portuguese Grand Prix saw Bernard fail to qualify, partially due to a bereavement, Suzuki qualified 25th and retired with transmission failure. The Spanish Grand Prix saw Suzuki fail to qualify, Bernard qualified 23rd and retired when he collided with Thierry Boutsen's Ligier. The Japanese Grand Prix saw Bernard break his leg in the first practice session and thus not take any further part in the race. Suzuki qualified 25th and disappointed his home crowd when his engine blew. The Australian Grand Prix saw Bertrand Gachot replace Bernard, but he and Suzuki failed to qualify.

== Complete Formula One results ==
(key)

Year	Entrant	Engine	Tyres	Drivers	1	2	3	4	5	6	7	8	9	10	11	12	13	14	15	16	Points	WCC
1991	Larrousse F1	Ford DFR V8	G		USA	BRA	SMR	MON	CAN	MEX	FRA	GBR	GER	HUN	BEL	ITA	POR	ESP	JPN	AUS	2	11th
1991	Larrousse F1	Ford DFR V8	G	Éric Bernard	Ret	Ret	Ret	9	Ret	6	Ret	Ret	Ret	Ret	Ret	Ret	DNQ	Ret	DNQ		2	11th
1991	Larrousse F1	Ford DFR V8	G	Bertrand Gachot																DNQ	2	11th
1991	Larrousse F1	Ford DFR V8	G	Aguri Suzuki	6	DNS	Ret	Ret	Ret	Ret	Ret	Ret	Ret	Ret	DNQ	DNQ	Ret	DNQ	Ret	DNQ	2	11th
