= Lola LC90 =

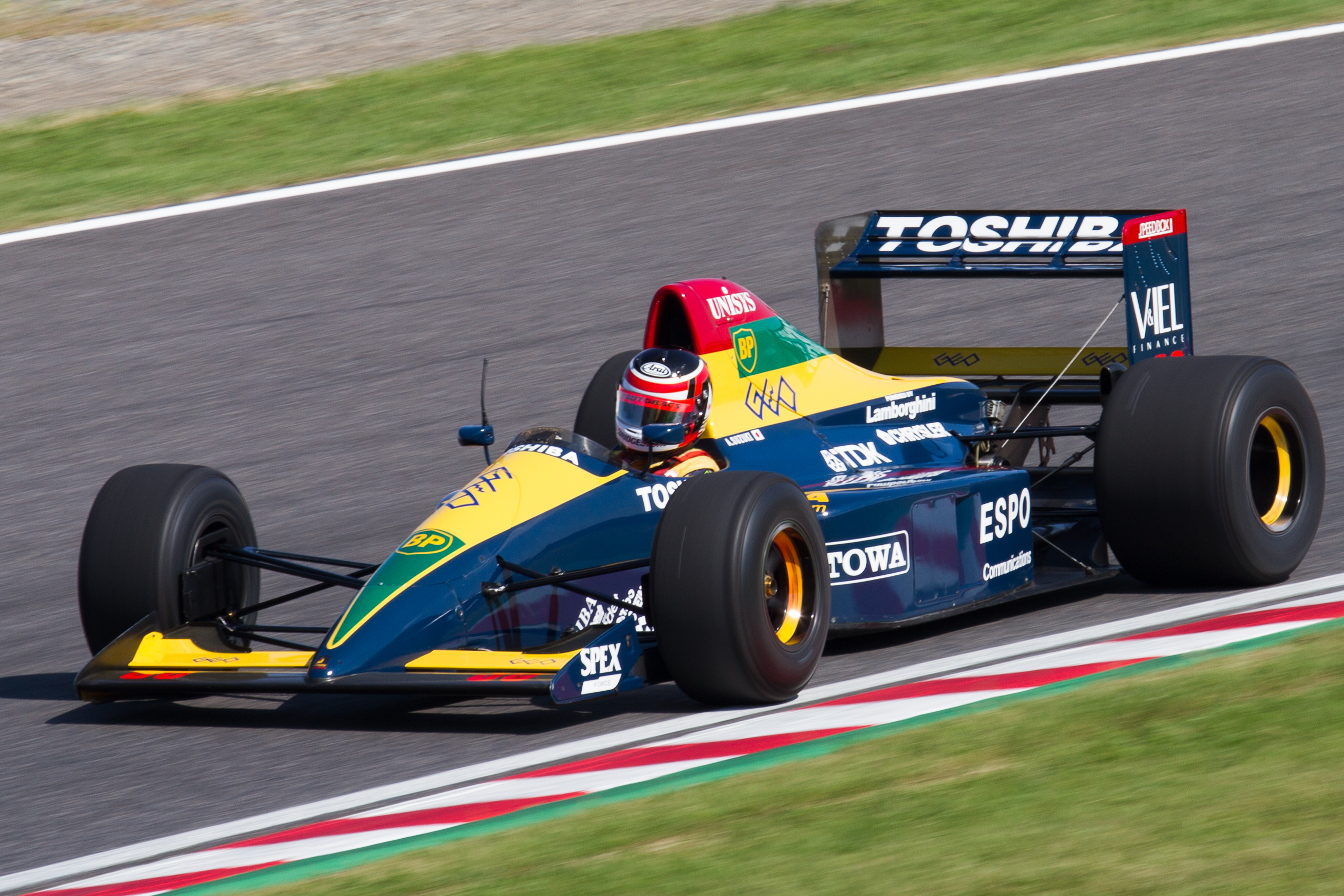
- Category: Formula One
- Constructor: Lola Cars
- Designers: Eric Broadley; Chris Murphy
- Predecessor: Lola LC89
- Successor: Lola LC91

Technical specifications
- Chassis: Carbon fibre monocoque
- Suspension (front): Double wishbones, pushrod, twin spring / dampers
- Suspension (rear): Double wishbones, pushrod, twin spring / dampers
- Axle track: Front: 1,810 mm (71.3 in); Rear: 1,620 mm (63.8 in)
- Wheelbase: 2,850 mm (112.2 in)
- Engine: Lamborghini LE3512, 3,493 cc (213.2 cu in), 80° V12, NA, mid-engine, longitudinally mounted
- Transmission: Lola 6-speed manual
- Fuel: BP
- Lubricants: BP
- Tyres: Goodyear

Competition history
- Notable entrants: ESPO Larrousse F1
- Notable drivers: 29. (France) Éric Bernard; 30. (Japan) Aguri Suzuki
- Debut: 1990 San Marino Grand Prix
Races	Wins	Podiums	Poles	F/Laps
14	0	1	0	0
- Constructors' Championships: 0
- Drivers' Championships: 0

The Lola LC90 was a Formula One car designed by Eric Broadley and Chris Murphy for use in the 1990 Formula One season by the Larrousse team. It was powered by the 3.5L Lamborghini LE3512 V12 engine. The car was driven by Japanese driver Aguri Suzuki who had spent 1989 failing to pre-qualify all 16 races for Zakspeed, and Frenchman Éric Bernard.

== Race history ==
The LC90 made its debut at the 1990 San Marino Grand Prix replacing the updated 1989 car, the LC89B used in the opening two rounds of the season. Aguri Suzuki scored the team's first podium (and the only one for Lamborghini's V12 which was rated at 640 bhp (477 kW; 649 PS) in 1990) in front of his home fans at Suzuka. After most of the major runners had dropped out of the race (both McLaren-Hondas and Ferraris), Suzuki finished a highly popular third at his home Grand Prix behind the Benetton-Fords of Nelson Piquet and Roberto Moreno. Suzuki even finished in front of the Renault V10 powered Williams pair of Riccardo Patrese and Thierry Boutsen. In fact, with two Brazilians and a Japanese driver finishing in the top 3, the Japanese Grand Prix was the last time (as of 2018) that no European driver has finished on the podium for a Formula One Grand Prix.

With Suzuki also scoring points at the British and Spanish Grands Prix, and Éric Bernard scoring points at Monaco, Britain and Hungary, the team ended the year with 11 points achieving sixth place in the Constructors' Championship.

During the first half of the season, Larrousse was forced to pre-qualify due to only scoring one point in 1989. However, with an improving Lamborghini engine, a chassis considered among the best in the field and two talented young drivers, pre-qualifying was never really a problem and indeed qualifying positions within the top 10 became more and more frequent as the season progressed.

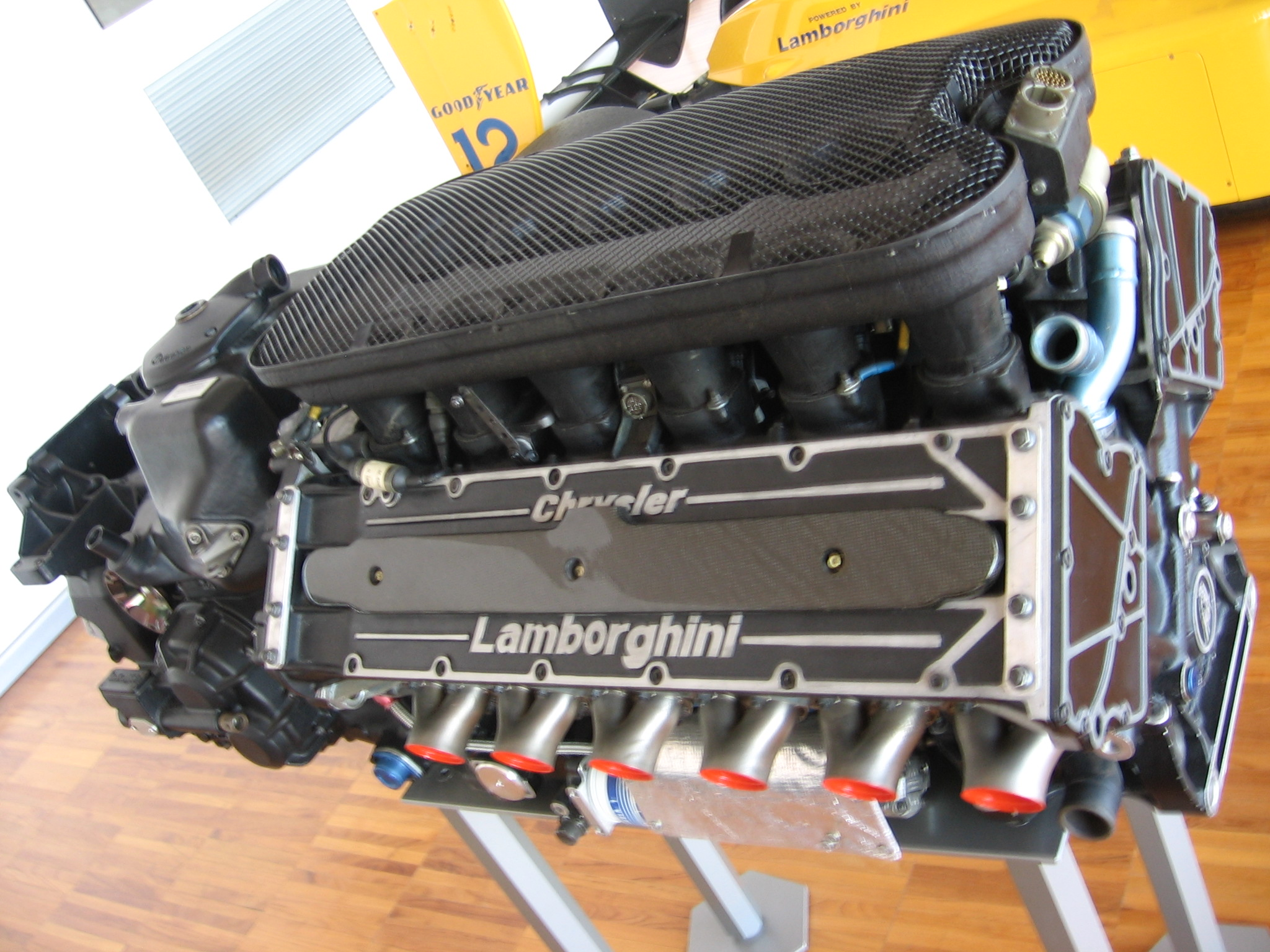
Lamborghini's V12 engine as used by the Larrousse team in 1990.

== Complete Formula One results ==
(key)

Year	Entrant	Engine(s)	Tyres	Drivers	1	2	3	4	5	6	7	8	9	10	11	12	13	14	15	16	Points	WCC
1990	ESPO Larrousse F1	Lamborghini 3512 V12	G		USA	BRA	SMR	MON	CAN	MEX	FRA	GBR	GER	HUN	BEL	ITA	POR	ESP	JPN	AUS	11	6th
1990	ESPO Larrousse F1	Lamborghini 3512 V12	G	Éric Bernard			13	6	9	Ret	8	4	Ret	6	9	Ret	Ret	Ret	Ret	Ret	11	6th
1990	ESPO Larrousse F1	Lamborghini 3512 V12	G	Aguri Suzuki			Ret	Ret	12	Ret	7	6	Ret	Ret	Ret	Ret	14	6	3	Ret	11	6th

- Results published in 1991 FIA Yearbook of Automobile Sport credited the constructor results to "Larrousse" rather than "Lola".
