= Lamborghini LE3512 =

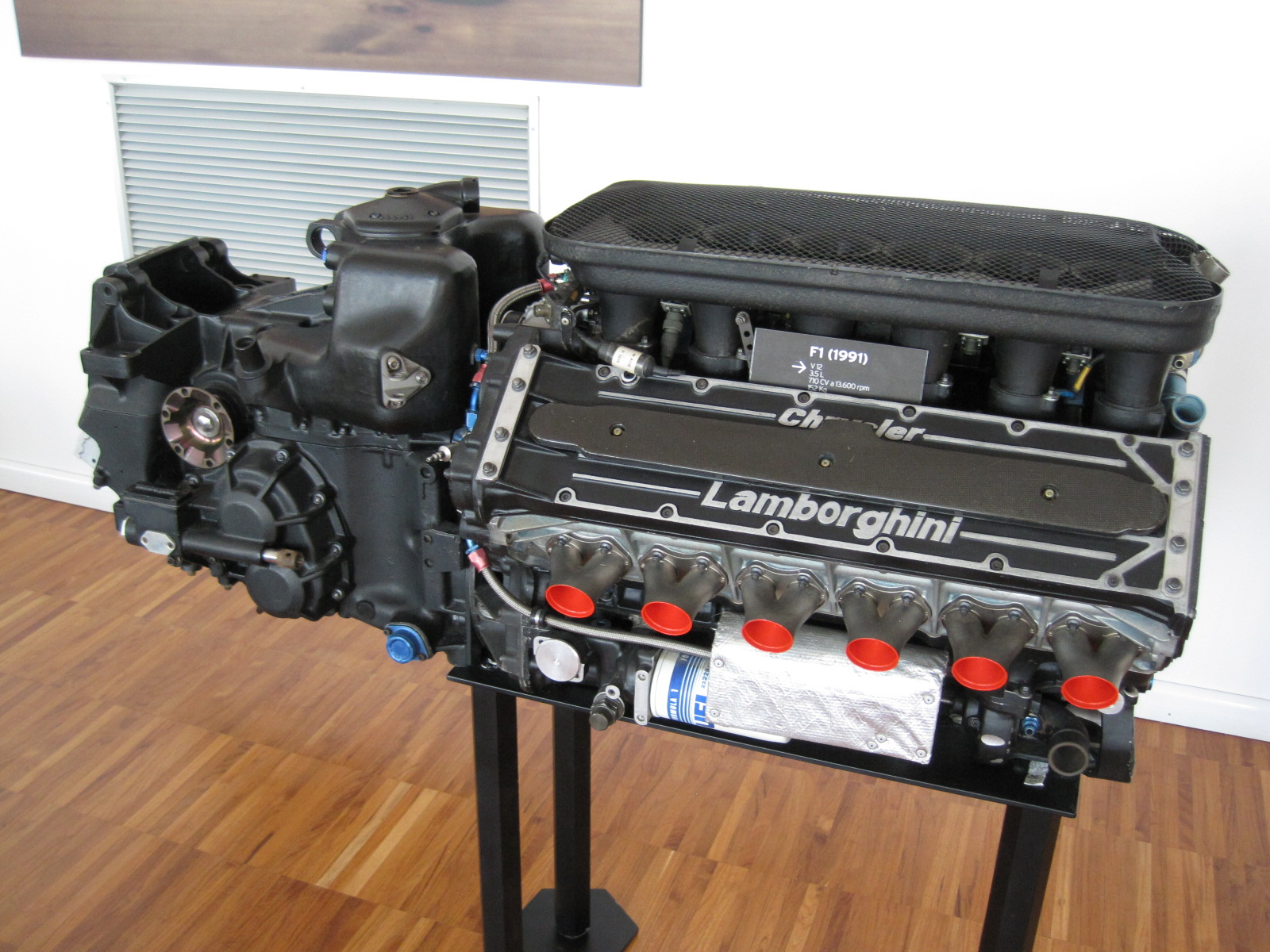

Overview
- Manufacturer: (Italy) Lamborghini
- Designer: Mauro Forghieri
- Production: 1989–1993

Layout
- Configuration: 80° V12
- Displacement: 3.5 L (3,493 cc)
- Cylinder bore: 87 mm (3 in)
- Piston stroke: 49 mm (2 in)
- Valvetrain: 48-valve, DOHC, four-valves per cylinder

Combustion
- Turbocharger: No
- Fuel system: Direct fuel injection
- Oil system: Dry sump

Output
- Power output: 600–750 hp (447–559 kW)
- Torque output: 285–330 lb⋅ft (386–447 N⋅m)

Dimensions
- Dry weight: 150 kg (331 lb)

The Lamborghini LE3512 was a naturally-aspirated V12 motor racing engine, designed and developed by Lamborghini, to compete in Formula One. The engine was raced between 1989 and 1993.

== Formula One ==
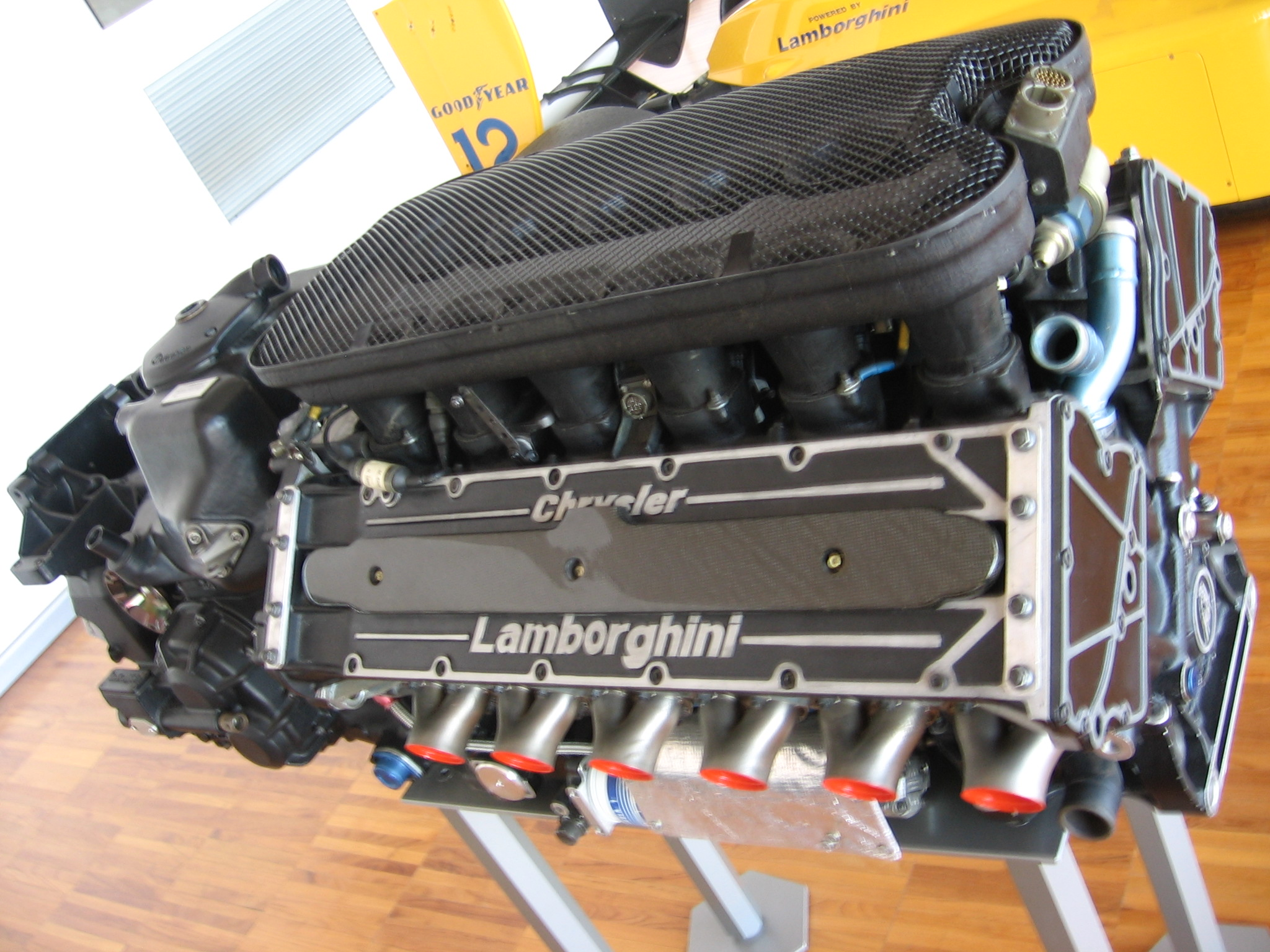
Lamborghini's 3.5L V12 Formula One engine, the 3512, at the Lamborghini Museum.

Lamborghini made the move to Formula One in 1989 when the FIA outlawed turbocharged engines. Former Scuderia Ferrari designer / engineer Mauro Forghieri was commissioned to design and build a new, 3.5 litre V12 engine for use by the French Larrousse team in 1989. Dubbed the Lamborghini LE3512, (Lamborghini Engineering 3.5 liters 12 cylinders) the 3,493 cc (213.2 cu in), 80° V12 engine was reported to be the best sounding engine of the new 3.5L naturally aspirated formula. Lamborghini representatives stated at the engine's début race, the 1989 Brazilian Grand Prix in Rio de Janeiro, that they chose a lower ranked team to join Formula One (Larrousse was in its third season using Lola chassis) as it was felt at the early stage of its development the 3512 would not be able to do justice to one of the teams usually closer to the front of the grid. Also, the front running teams already had existing engine suppliers in place (McLaren with Honda, Williams with Renault, Benetton with Ford, and Ferrari who made their own V12 engines).

The Lamborghini V12 did impress many in 1989 despite its unreliability, and the engine's best result in its first year came thanks to fast but accident-prone Larrousse driver Philippe Alliot when he qualified his Lola LC89 in 5th position for the Spanish Grand Prix at Jerez, only 1.417 seconds slower than the V10 McLaren-Honda of pole winner Ayrton Senna. Alliot then backed up that performance by scoring the engine's first point in Formula One by finishing 6th in the race and setting the 4th fastest race lap in the process. Alliot's teammate for the second half of 1989, former Ferrari driver Michele Alboreto, never came to grips with either the Lola or the Lamborghini. In his eight races for Larrousse he recorded four DNF's, two failures to pre-qualify, one failure to qualify, and a single 11th-place finish in Portugal.

The Lamborghini V12's best finish came when Larrousse driver Aguri Suzuki finished 3rd in the infamous 1990 Japanese Grand Prix at Suzuka. Its time in Formula One (1989-1993) would prove to be frustrating though as poor reliability became the norm for the engine, despite being used by Grand Prix winning teams such as Lotus and Ligier who could boast driving talent such as Derek Warwick (Lotus - 1990), and Thierry Boutsen (Ligier - 1991). In a 2014 interview, Warwick said of the 3512 that it was "All noise and no go".

In 1993 after four years in Formula One with only one significant result for the engine, Bob Lutz of Lamborghini's parent company Chrysler, did a hand-shake deal with McLaren boss Ron Dennis for the team to test the LE3512 to evaluate its potential as a race winner. McLaren made a modified version of their 1993 race car, the McLaren MP4/8 dubbed the MP4/8B, to test the engine (the test car took three months to modify to fit the longer and heavier V12). Testing was completed by triple World Champion Ayrton Senna, and future dual World Champion Mika Häkkinen at both the Silverstone Circuit in England and the Estoril circuit in Portugal. After his first drive of the car at Silverstone, Senna suggested certain changes to Forghieri (a less brutal 'top end' and a fatter mid-range), and he complied with engine power increased from 710 bhp (529 kW; 720 PS) to approximately 750 bhp (559 kW; 760 PS) and both drivers were very impressed despite the engine still being somewhat unreliable (Häkkinen reported a massive engine blow up while testing at Silverstone, though he did manage to lap the 5.226 km (3.260 mi) circuit some 1.4 seconds faster than the teams MP4/8 race car powered by a 680–700 bhp (507–522 kW; 689–710 PS) Ford V8 engine). According to reports, Senna even wanted to race the engine at the Japanese Grand Prix believing that while reliability might be a problem (according to McLaren's engineers, the most they got out of any of the more powerful test engines before failure was just 19 laps at Silverstone), at least he would be quicker than with the Ford powered race car (ironically Senna would win in both Japan and the last race in Australia with the existing MP4/8). Despite this however, Ron Dennis decided to go with Peugeot V10 engines in 1994 due to a better commercial agreement that would give long term stability to the team and at the end of the 1993 season, the Lamborghini LE3512 was retired from Grand Prix racing after the company was sold by Chrysler to an Indonesian investor group led by Tommy Suharto.

The Lamborghini, which on all cars it powered carried the words "Chrysler powered by Lamborghini" (other than the McLaren MP4/8B which was all virgin white, though the test engines were badged as Chrysler), was one of only five V12 engines used in the naturally aspirated era from 1989–2013, the others being from Ferrari (1989-1995), Honda (1991-1992), Yamaha (1991-1992), and Porsche (1991). The only other 12 cylinder engines in Formula One during this time were disastrous efforts by Life Racing Engines with their W12 engine and Subaru who reintroduced the Flat 12 to the sport, both appearing in the first half of 1990.

== Sportscar racing ==
The Lamborghini LE3512 also saw limited use in the World Sportscar Championship in 1991. Lamborghini briefly teamed with Konrad Motorsport ran by Austrian driver and team founder Franz Konrad to run the V12 engine in a new chassis called the Konrad KM-011. The car, driven by Stefan Johansson and Franz Konrad, failed to qualify for its first race at the Nürburgring, though it would qualify for the next round at Magny-Cours, but only lasted 18 laps before retiring with a failed starter motor.

The car was entered by Konrad for the 1992 World Sportscar Championship, but Konrad instead chose to race his more reliable Porsche 962.

=== LE3512 power output ===
- 1989 - 600 bhp (447 kW; 608 PS) at 11,200 rpm
- 1990 - 640 bhp (477 kW; 649 PS) at 13,000 rpm
- 1991 - 640 bhp (477 kW; 649 PS) at 13,600 rpm
- 1992 - 700 bhp (522 kW; 710 PS) at 13,800 rpm
- 1993 - 710 bhp (529 kW; 720 PS) at 13,800 rpm
- 1993 - 750 bhp (559 kW; 760 PS) at 13,800 rpm (McLaren tests)

=== F1 statistics 1989-1993 ===
- Races - 80 (49 starts)
- First Race - 1989 Brazilian Grand Prix at Jacarepaguá
- First Chassis - Larrousse Lola LC88C
- Last Race - 1993 Australian Grand Prix at Adelaide
- Last Chassis - Larrousse LH93
- Wins - 0
- Pole Positions - 0
- Podiums - 1 (3rd - 1990 Japanese Grand Prix at Suzuka, Aguri Suzuki, Larrousse Lola LC90)
- Points - 20
- Teams - Larrousse (1989, 1990, 1992, 1993), Lotus (1990), Ligier (1991), Modena Team (1991), Minardi (1992)
- Best Qualifying - 5th, Philippe Alliot, Larrouse Lola LC89, 1989 Spanish Grand Prix at Jerez
- Best Constructors' Championship - 6th, Larrousse, 1990 (11 points)
- Best Drivers' Championship - 12th, Aguri Suzuki, 1990 (6 points)

== See also ==
- Yamaha F1 engine
- Ferrari V12 F1 engine
- Subaru 1235
- Life Racing Engines
- Honda V12 engine
- Porsche 3512
