= 1990 Formula One World Championship =

44th season of FIA Formula One motor racing

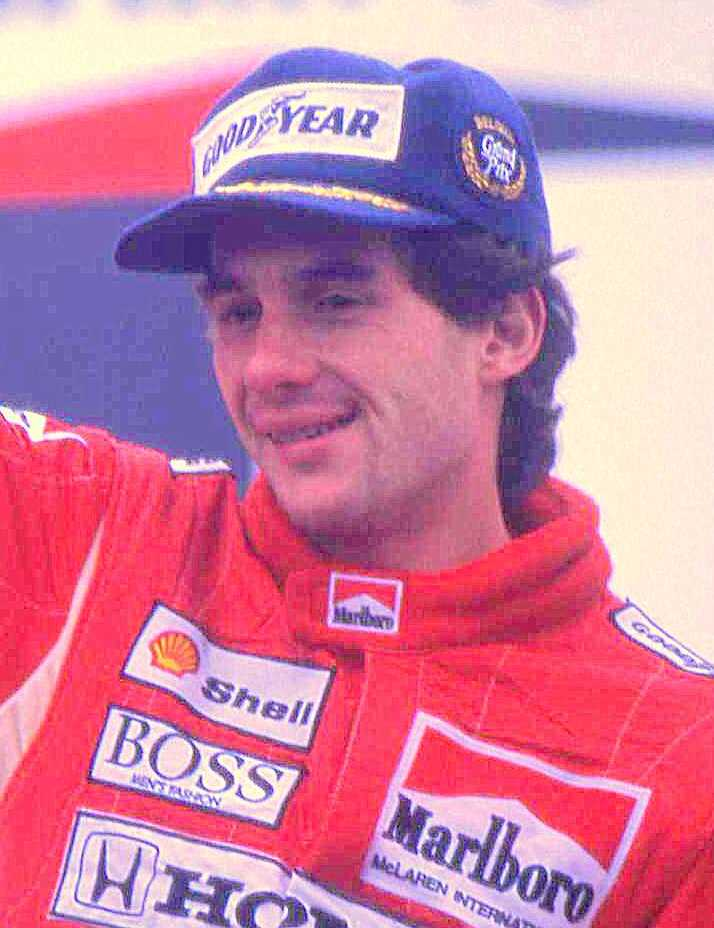
Ayrton Senna (pictured in 1989) won his second title with McLaren.

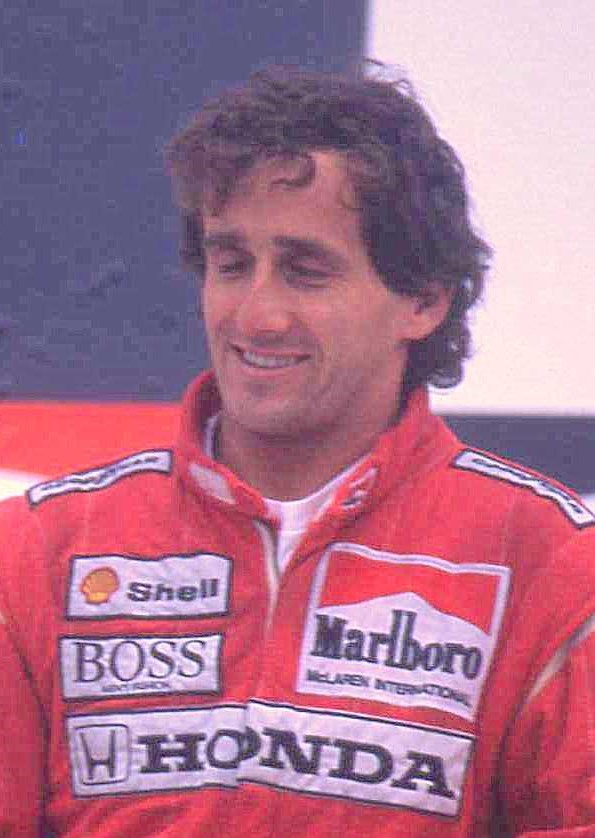
Then three-time and defending Champion Alain Prost (pictured here driving for McLaren in 1989) was runner-up by 7 points for Ferrari.

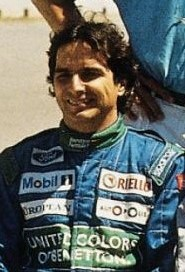
3 time world champion Nelson Piquet, finished the season ranked third for Benetton.

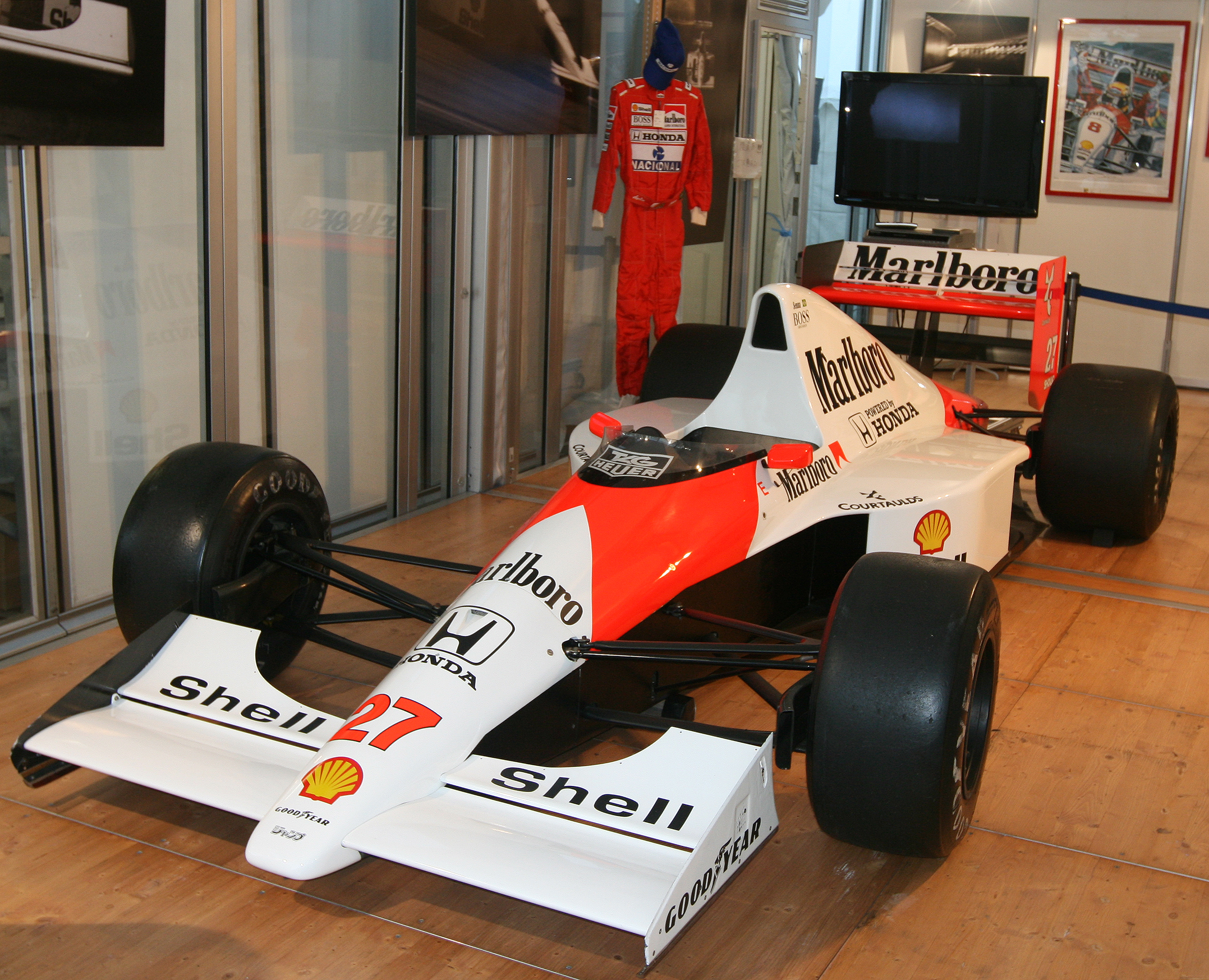
McLaren won the 1990 Formula One World Championship for Constructors.

Ferrari placed second in the 1990 Formula One World Championship for Constructors.

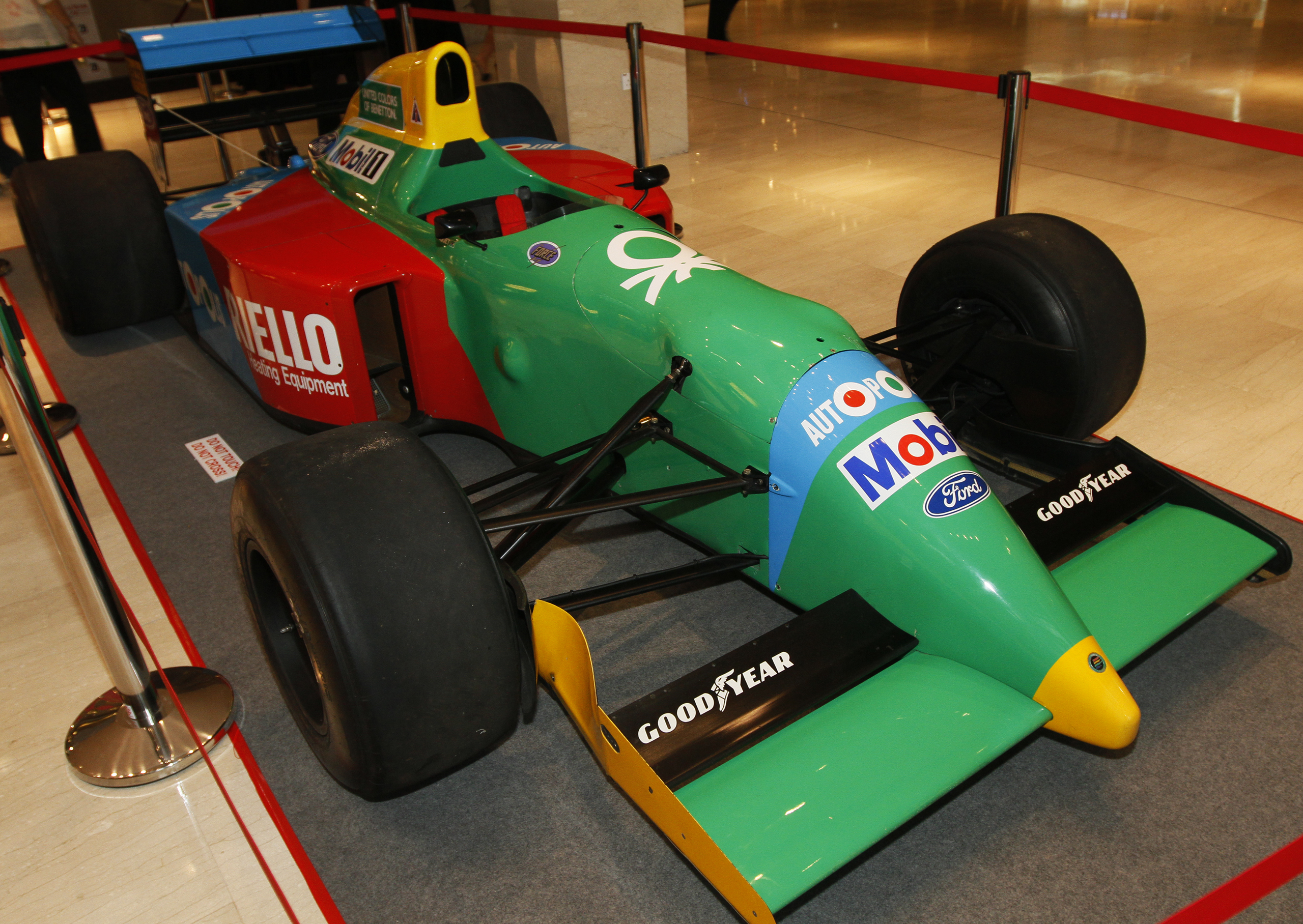
Benetton placed third in the 1990 Formula One World Championship for Constructors.

The 1990 FIA Formula One World Championship was the 44th season of FIA Formula One motor racing. It featured the 1990 Formula One World Championship for Drivers and the 1990 Formula One World Championship for Constructors, which were contested concurrently over a sixteen-race series that commenced on 11 March and ended on 4 November. Ayrton Senna won the Drivers' Championship for the second time, and McLaren-Honda won their third consecutive Constructors' Championship.

The championship featured a dramatic battle between Senna and former teammate Alain Prost, who had made the switch to Ferrari. Prost mounted Ferrari's first title challenge for several years, and led the championship after three consecutive mid-season wins. Senna fought back strongly and went into the penultimate round at the Suzuka circuit in Japan with a nine-point lead over Prost. There, Senna took pole position only for Prost to beat him off the line; the Brazilian driver then drove into the Frenchman at the first corner, putting both out and thus settling the championship in Senna's favour. This was the second year in succession that the two drivers had collided at Suzuka. Senna admitted the following year that the collision was deliberate, as he was furious that Prost had been able to start on the clean side of the grid and had decided that he was not going to allow the Frenchman to 'make the corner' should he lose the start. Significantly, 1990 would be the last season in which drivers would be able drop their worst scores from their official championship points score as from the following season all of a driver's results across the championship season would count towards the official classification in the drivers' championship.

== Drivers and constructors ==
The following teams and drivers competed in the 1990 FIA Formula One World Championship.

Entrant	Constructor	Chassis	Engine	Tyre	No	Driver	Rounds
(Italy) Scuderia Ferrari	Ferrari	641	Ferrari Tipo 036 3.5 V12; Ferrari Tipo 037 3.5 V12	G	1	(France) Alain Prost	All
(Italy) Scuderia Ferrari	Ferrari	641	Ferrari Tipo 036 3.5 V12; Ferrari Tipo 037 3.5 V12	G	2	(United Kingdom) Nigel Mansell	All
(United Kingdom) Tyrrell Racing Organisation	Tyrrell-Ford	018; 019	Ford Cosworth DFR 3.5 V8	P	3	(Japan) Satoru Nakajima	All
(United Kingdom) Tyrrell Racing Organisation	Tyrrell-Ford	018; 019	Ford Cosworth DFR 3.5 V8	P	4	(France) Jean Alesi	All
(United Kingdom) Canon Williams	Williams-Renault	FW13B	Renault RS2 3.5 V10	G	5	(Belgium) Thierry Boutsen	All
(United Kingdom) Canon Williams	Williams-Renault	FW13B	Renault RS2 3.5 V10	G	6	(Italy) Riccardo Patrese	All
(United Kingdom) Motor Racing Developments	Brabham-Judd	BT58; BT59	Judd EV 3.5 V8	P	7	(Switzerland) Gregor Foitek	1–2
(United Kingdom) Motor Racing Developments	Brabham-Judd	BT58; BT59	Judd EV 3.5 V8	P	7	(Australia) David Brabham	3–16
(United Kingdom) Motor Racing Developments	Brabham-Judd	BT58; BT59	Judd EV 3.5 V8	P	8	(Italy) Stefano Modena	All
(United Kingdom) Footwork Arrows Ford	Arrows-Ford	A11; A11B	Ford Cosworth DFR 3.5 V8	G	9	(Italy) Michele Alboreto	All
(United Kingdom) Footwork Arrows Ford	Arrows-Ford	A11; A11B	Ford Cosworth DFR 3.5 V8	G	10	(West Germany) Bernd Schneider	1, 14
(United Kingdom) Footwork Arrows Ford	Arrows-Ford	A11; A11B	Ford Cosworth DFR 3.5 V8	G	10	(Italy) Alex Caffi	2–13, 15–16
(United Kingdom) Camel Team Lotus	Lotus-Lamborghini	102	Lamborghini LE3512 3.5 V12	G	11	(United Kingdom) Derek Warwick	All
(United Kingdom) Camel Team Lotus	Lotus-Lamborghini	102	Lamborghini LE3512 3.5 V12	G	12	(United Kingdom) Martin Donnelly	1–14
(United Kingdom) Camel Team Lotus	Lotus-Lamborghini	102	Lamborghini LE3512 3.5 V12	G	12	(United Kingdom) Johnny Herbert	15–16
(Italy) Fondmetal Osella	Osella-Ford	FA1M; FA1ME	Ford Cosworth DFR 3.5 V8	P	14	(France) Olivier Grouillard	All
(United Kingdom) Leyton House Racing	Leyton House-Judd	CG901	Judd EV 3.5 V8	G	15	(Brazil) Maurício Gugelmin	All
(United Kingdom) Leyton House Racing	Leyton House-Judd	CG901	Judd EV 3.5 V8	G	16	(Italy) Ivan Capelli	All
(France) AGS	AGS-Ford	JH24; JH25	Ford Cosworth DFR 3.5 V8	G	17	(Italy) Gabriele Tarquini	All
(France) AGS	AGS-Ford	JH24; JH25	Ford Cosworth DFR 3.5 V8	G	18	(France) Yannick Dalmas	All
(United Kingdom) Benetton Formula	Benetton-Ford	B189B; B190	Ford HBA4 3.5 V8	G	19	(Italy) Alessandro Nannini	1–14
(United Kingdom) Benetton Formula	Benetton-Ford	B189B; B190	Ford HBA4 3.5 V8	G	19	(Brazil) Roberto Moreno	15–16
(United Kingdom) Benetton Formula	Benetton-Ford	B189B; B190	Ford HBA4 3.5 V8	G	20	(Brazil) Nelson Piquet	All
(Italy) BMS Scuderia Italia	Dallara-Ford	F190	Ford Cosworth DFR 3.5 V8	P	21	(Italy) Gianni Morbidelli	1–2
(Italy) BMS Scuderia Italia	Dallara-Ford	F190	Ford Cosworth DFR 3.5 V8	P	21	(Italy) Emanuele Pirro	3–16
(Italy) BMS Scuderia Italia	Dallara-Ford	F190	Ford Cosworth DFR 3.5 V8	P	22	(Italy) Andrea de Cesaris	All
(Italy) SCM Minardi Team	Minardi-Ford	M189; M190	Ford Cosworth DFR 3.5 V8	P	23	(Italy) Pierluigi Martini	All
(Italy) SCM Minardi Team	Minardi-Ford	M189; M190	Ford Cosworth DFR 3.5 V8	P	24	(Italy) Paolo Barilla	1–14
(Italy) SCM Minardi Team	Minardi-Ford	M189; M190	Ford Cosworth DFR 3.5 V8	P	24	(Italy) Gianni Morbidelli	15–16
(France) Équipe Ligier Gitanes	Ligier-Ford	JS33B	Ford Cosworth DFR 3.5 V8	G	25	(Italy) Nicola Larini	All
(France) Équipe Ligier Gitanes	Ligier-Ford	JS33B	Ford Cosworth DFR 3.5 V8	G	26	(France) Philippe Alliot	All
(United Kingdom) Honda Marlboro McLaren	McLaren-Honda	MP4/5B	Honda RA100E 3.5 V10	G	27	(Brazil) Ayrton Senna	All
(United Kingdom) Honda Marlboro McLaren	McLaren-Honda	MP4/5B	Honda RA100E 3.5 V10	G	28	(Austria) Gerhard Berger	All
(France) ESPO Larrousse F1	Lola-Lamborghini	LC89B; LC90	Lamborghini LE3512 3.5 V12	G	29	(France) Éric Bernard	All
(France) ESPO Larrousse F1	Lola-Lamborghini	LC89B; LC90	Lamborghini LE3512 3.5 V12	G	30	(Japan) Aguri Suzuki	All
(Italy) Subaru Coloni Racing (Italy) Coloni Racing	Subaru Coloni	C3B	Subaru 1235 3.5 F12	G	31	(Belgium) Bertrand Gachot	1–8
(Italy) Subaru Coloni Racing (Italy) Coloni Racing	Coloni-Ford	C3C	Ford Cosworth DFR 3.5 V8	G	31	(Belgium) Bertrand Gachot	9–16
(Italy) EuroBrun Racing	EuroBrun-Judd	ER189B	Judd CV 3.5 V8	P	33	(Brazil) Roberto Moreno	1–14
(Italy) EuroBrun Racing	EuroBrun-Judd	ER189B	Judd CV 3.5 V8	P	34	(Italy) Claudio Langes	1–14
(United Kingdom) Onyx Grand Prix (United Kingdom) Monteverdi Formula One	Onyx-Ford	ORE-1; ORE-1B	Ford Cosworth DFR 3.5 V8	G	35	(Sweden) Stefan Johansson	1–2
(United Kingdom) Onyx Grand Prix (United Kingdom) Monteverdi Formula One	Onyx-Ford	ORE-1; ORE-1B	Ford Cosworth DFR 3.5 V8	G	35	(Switzerland) Gregor Foitek	3–10
(United Kingdom) Onyx Grand Prix (United Kingdom) Monteverdi Formula One	Onyx-Ford	ORE-1; ORE-1B	Ford Cosworth DFR 3.5 V8	G	36	(Finland) JJ Lehto	1–10
(Italy) Life Racing Engines	Life	L190	Life F35 3.5 W12	G	39	(Australia) Gary Brabham	1–2
(Italy) Life Racing Engines	Life	L190	Life F35 3.5 W12	G	39	(Italy) Bruno Giacomelli	3–12
(Italy) Life Racing Engines	Life-Judd	L190	Judd CV 3.5 V8	G	39	(Italy) Bruno Giacomelli	13–14

=== Team changes ===
- The teams Rial and Zakspeed left Formula One after the 1989 season.
- March's main sponsor Leyton House completed their takeover of the team and officially registered as a new constructor.
- Life entered the sport, trying to market their unconventional W12 engine.
- Lotus took on Lamborghini as their engine supplier.
- Coloni struck a deal with Subaru and sold 51% of its shares to the Japanese car manufacturer.

==== Mid-season changes ====
- Faced with disappointing results in the first six races of the year, highly regarded designer Adrian Newey was fired from the Leyton House team.
- The Subaru flat-12 engine supplied to Coloni was not producing more than 500 brake horsepower (370 kW) and the chassis was overweight by some 300 pounds (140 kg). Good results stayed away and Subaru withdrew their ownership. By the German Grand Prix, Coloni had arranged a supply of Ford-Cosworth engines.
- The Life W12 engine was equally unsuccessful and the team switched to a Judd V8 engine before the Portuguese Grand Prix.
- Onyx folded after ten races, and EuroBrun and Life after fourteen of the sixteen races.

=== Driver changes ===
- Nine drivers had left the grid, compared to the last race of the 1989 season, amongst them were Eddie Cheever, embarking on a successful career in IndyCar racing, and René Arnoux, who retired.
- Alain Prost moved to Ferrari as a result of his stressful rivalry with his teammate Ayrton Senna and an overall unhappy year at McLaren, despite winning the 1989 championship. Gerhard Berger moved to McLaren to complete the switch.
- Triple world champion Nelson Piquet moved away from Lotus, having endured two disappointing seasons and getting the news of the new Lamborghini supply contract. Piquet's contract turned out to be incentive-based: he would be paid US$100,000 for every point scored, though he was also paid a season retainer. The other Lotus driver, Satoru Nakajima, moved to Tyrrell over the winter, replacing Jonathan Palmer, who was signed as McLaren's test driver. Lotus attracted Derek Warwick from Arrows and promoted their test driver Martin Donnelly.
- Three drivers made their debuts at the start of the season: Paolo Barilla at Minardi, Claudio Langes at EuroBrun and Gary Brabham at Life. Gianni Morbidelli became the fourth when he was needed as a stand-in (see Mid-season changes).

Another eight driver switches had happened over the winter, within the lower-ranking teams.

==== Mid-season changes ====
- Due to a pre-season cycling accident, Alex Caffi was forced to sit out the opening race, with Bernd Schneider filling the gap.
- Gary Brabham quit the Life team when seeing that no improvement in form was to be expected. Bruno Giacomelli took his place, having last raced in F1 in 1983.
- Gary's brother David Brabham signed with Brabham, the team owned by their father and triple world champion Jack Brabham. However, he requested to skip the first two races to prepare himself. Gregor Foitek stood in for him. Then, without missing a race, Foitek moved over to Onyx, after driver Stefan Johansson had fallen out with new team owner Peter Monteverdi.
- Gianni Morbidelli stood in for Emanuele Pirro at Scuderia Italia for the first two races of the season. He also replaced Paolo Barilla at Minardi for the final two races, and stayed with the team until the end of 1992.
- Lotus's test driver Johnny Herbert stepped up to the racing seat after Donnelly suffered a career-ending crash in the Spanish Grand Prix.
- When EuroBrun folded, Roberto Moreno found a new home in Benetton, after their driver Alessandro Nannini was involved in a helicopter crash. Moreno drove two races in 1990 and stayed with the team over the next year.

== Calendar ==
Round	Grand Prix	Circuit	Date
1	United States Grand Prix	(United States) Phoenix Street Circuit, Phoenix, Arizona	11 March
2	Brazilian Grand Prix	(Brazil) Autódromo José Carlos Pace, São Paulo	25 March
3	San Marino Grand Prix	(Italy) Autodromo Enzo e Dino Ferrari, Imola	13 May
4	Monaco Grand Prix	Circuit de Monaco, Monte Carlo	27 May
5	Canadian Grand Prix	(Canada) Circuit Gilles Villeneuve, Montreal	10 June
6	Mexican Grand Prix	Autódromo Hermanos Rodríguez, Mexico City	24 June
7	French Grand Prix	(France) Circuit Paul Ricard, Le Castellet	8 July
8	British Grand Prix	(United Kingdom) Silverstone Circuit, Silverstone	15 July
9	German Grand Prix	(West Germany) Hockenheimring, Hockenheim	29 July
10	Hungarian Grand Prix	(Hungary) Hungaroring, Mogyoród	12 August
11	Belgian Grand Prix	(Belgium) Circuit de Spa-Francorchamps, Stavelot	26 August
12	Italian Grand Prix	(Italy) Autodromo Nazionale di Monza, Monza	9 September
13	Portuguese Grand Prix	(Portugal) Autódromo do Estoril, Estoril	23 September
14	Spanish Grand Prix	(Spain) Circuito de Jerez, Jerez de la Frontera	30 September
15	Japanese Grand Prix	(Japan) Suzuka International Racing Course, Suzuka	21 October
16	Australian Grand Prix	(Australia) Adelaide Street Circuit, Adelaide	4 November

=== Calendar change ===
The United States Grand Prix was moved from June to March to become the first round.

The Brazilian Grand Prix was returned to the Interlagos Circuit for the first time since 1980, with a shorter track layout after a major renovation of the facility.

The Canadian Grand Prix was moved to be before the Mexican Grand Prix.

== Regulation changes ==
Three regulation changes occurred before the 1990 season, all from the aspect of driver safety:

=== Technical regulations ===
- Larger rear-view mirrors
- Quick-release steering wheel mandatory

=== Sporting and event regulations ===
- All marshals and medical staff must practice driver extrication exercises.

== Season report ==
=== Race 1: USA ===
The first race of the year was held on an angular street circuit in Phoenix, Arizona, USA; the race became the season opener so it could be held in cooler and much more pleasant weather, avoiding the 104 °F (40 °C) degree heat that made conditions very difficult at the previous race in Phoenix, which took place in June 1989. Unexpected rain in qualifying led to a grid with Gerhard Berger on pole position with Pierluigi Martini second in the Minardi, Andrea de Cesaris third in the Dallara, Jean Alesi fourth in the Tyrrell, Ayrton Senna down in fifth and Nelson Piquet sixth. Alesi took the lead at the start ahead of Berger, de Cesaris, Senna, Martini and Piquet.

Alesi pulled away and Berger was dropping back Senna passed de Cesaris. Berger hit a wall on lap 9 forcing him to pit. He charged back but later retired with clutch problems. Alesi was 8.2 seconds ahead but Senna started to reel him in. Senna attacked on lap 34 but Alesi defended and kept the lead. Senna overtook Alesi one lap later and pulled away to win. Both Ferraris retired with Alain Prost retiring on lap 21 with an oil leak and Nigel Mansell on lap 49 with clutch problems. After that, Thierry Boutsen passed Piquet to take third with Stefano Modena's Brabham and Satoru Nakajima's Tyrrell getting the final points.

=== Race 2: Brazil ===
The Brazilian Grand Prix had returned to the Interlagos Autodrome in São Paulo for the first time since 1980, having been at the Jacarepagua Riocentro Autodrome in Rio de Janeiro for 9 previous seasons consecutively, and 1978. The circuit had been shortened from 4.9 mi (7.9 km) to 2.6 mi (4.2 km).

During qualifying, Senna and Berger were 1–2 with Boutsen and Patrese 3–4 and the Ferraris of Nigel Mansell and Alain Prost behind them. At the start, Senna led Berger, Boutsen, Prost, Patrese and Mansell. Boutsen passed Berger early on but could not keep up with Senna.

At the stops, Boutsen ran into a tyre and had to change his nose cone, dropping back to 11th and some good work from the Ferrari crew got Prost ahead of Berger and Mansell ahead of Patrese. Senna was ahead of Prost, Berger, Mansell, Patrese and Alesi. Senna, 10 seconds ahead of everybody hit the backmarker, former teammate Nakajima, forcing him to pit and drop back to third. With just a few laps to go, Patrese retired with a broken oil cooler. Prost won from Berger, Senna, Mansell, the recovering Boutsen and Piquet.

=== Race 3: San Marino ===
There was a six-week gap before the San Marino round, at the Autodromo Enzo e Dino Ferrari near Bologna in Italy; a number of changes were made to most of the cars during this period. An almost identical grid to Brazil saw Senna, Berger, Patrese, Boutsen, Mansell and Prost line up after qualifying. At the start, Senna and Berger got away well but Boutsen sliced ahead of Patrese to take third with Mansell and Prost behind. Boutsen passed Berger on lap 2. On the next lap, a stone sliced through Senna's wheelrim, spinning him into a sand trap and out of the race. Boutsen pulled away from Berger but his engine blew on lap 18.

Soon Mansell passed Patrese and then attacked Berger. Berger closed the door and Mansell spun without hitting anything nor losing a place. He set off after Berger again but retired with engine problems. At the second stops, Nannini got ahead of Prost. Patrese closed in on Berger and passed him on lap 51. Patrese pulled away and won his first Grand Prix since South Africa in 1983 from Berger, Nannini, Prost, Piquet and Alesi.

=== Race 4: Monaco ===
In Monaco, Senna took pole but Prost was second with Alesi third ahead of Patrese, Berger and Boutsen. At the start, Berger collided with Prost at Mirabeau, blocking the track and stopping the race. The second start was all right and Senna led from Prost, Alesi, Berger, Patrese and Boutsen.

The race settled down and nothing changed until lap 30 when Prost retired with a battery failure. Then Mansell hit the back of Boutsen and was forced to pit and changed his front wing. Patrese's distributor failed on lap 42. Behind, Mansell was charging through the field and passed Boutsen to take fourth. But then he was sidelined with the same problem as Prost. At the front, Senna won from Alesi, Berger, Boutsen, Alex Caffi in the Arrows and Éric Bernard's Larrousse.

=== Race 5: Canada ===
Canada was next and at the Circuit Gilles Villeneuve in Montreal the McLarens were 1–2 in qualifying with Senna ahead of Berger with Prost third, Nannini fourth, Piquet fifth and Boutsen sixth. The track was damp on race day and Berger jumped the start and then hesitated. He got a 1-minute time penalty as well as allowing Senna to lead on the road. Senna led Nannini, Alesi, Prost, Boutsen and Piquet.

The track began to dry and everyone pitted. But when Nannini rejoined, he hit a groundhog and had to pit again for repairs. He spun off on lap 22. Berger took the lead on the road but he needed a minute to stay ahead at the end. He charged and was a second quicker than the others as Boutsen spun off while battling Prost. Senna now led from Prost, Piquet, Mansell, Patrese and Derek Warwick.

Piquet after many laps finally passed Prost who was then attacked by Mansell. Patrese retired putting Berger to fifth (he got ahead of Warwick before). Mansell passed Prost and slowly pulled away. With two laps to go, Berger got past Prost on aggregate but could not get ahead of Mansell. Senna won from Piquet, Mansell, Berger, Prost and Warwick.

=== Race 6: Mexico ===
After Canada came the Autodromo Hermanos Rodriguez in Mexico City and Berger qualified on pole position with Patrese beside him and Senna third, Mansell fourth, Boutsen fifth and Alesi sixth. At the start, Patrese and Berger jumped Senna while Piquet got ahead of Boutsen and Mansell. Early on, Senna passed Patrese and Berger followed him through. Patrese was dropping back and Piquet got by him as well. Boutsen was the next to go through but at the same time Berger had a problem with his tyre and was forced to stop and dropped to 12th position. Senna lead from Piquet, Boutsen, Patrese, Mansell and Prost.

Soon, Mansell passed Patrese and got Boutsen four laps later as Prost did the same to Patrese. Prost sneaked ahead of Boutsen as Mansell closed in on Piquet. Mansell got ahead on lap 36 and Prost followed him through six laps later. Piquet soon stopped and dropped behind Nannini, Boutsen (who already stopped) and Berger. Berger passed Boutsen on lap 47 and Nannini four laps later. Prost passed Mansell on lap 55 and they began to close in on Senna. Prost, passed Senna followed by Mansell. Then Mansell spun but at the same time Senna got a puncture that led to him retiring in the pits 4 laps before the end and allowing Berger to get third and close in to Mansell. With a daring move Berger passed Mansell but Mansell charged back and attacked taking back second place after making an even more daring pass around the outside of Berger at the fastest corner on the track, the 180-degree Peraltada corner. Prost won with Mansell second making it a Ferrari 1–2 ahead of Berger, Nannini, Boutsen and Piquet.

=== Race 7: France ===
France was next, being held at the Paul Ricard circuit near the coastal city of Marseille. The fans were wearing red and a Ferrari did take pole position. However, it was not their hero Prost but Mansell who was ahead of Berger, Senna, Prost, Nannini and Patrese. At the start, Berger got past Mansell while Prost lost out as well. Berger led with Mansell, Senna, Nannini, Patrese and Prost behind. On lap 2, Senna passed Mansell for second and soon after Prost passed Patrese. The order stayed like that until Senna passed Berger who had been too hard on his tyres in the early stages.

Nannini and Piquet pitted early while Berger and Senna went too late. Mansell's and Prost's tyres lasted longer and thus they pitted late. Riccardo Patrese went too late and was the big loser. This left the two Leyton Houses (they planned the race without a stop) ahead with a totally shuffled order behind them. Ivan Capelli led Maurício Gugelmin, Prost, Nannini, Mansell and Senna. Prost then caught and passed Gugelmin who then went out with engine trouble.

As Prost closed in on Capelli, Mansell in 8th place could not get by Berger, Piquet and Senna. Capelli continued to defend from Prost as Mansell went out with engine trouble. Nannini moved into third but was then forced to retire with electrical trouble, while Prost finally passed Capelli with three laps to go. Prost won ahead of Capelli, Senna, Piquet, Berger and Patrese.

=== Race 8: Great Britain ===
Britain was next and Mansell, roared on by his home fans at the fast Silverstone airfield circuit, took pole from Senna, followed by Berger, Boutsen, Prost and Alesi. Senna passed Mansell at the first corner and led for the first 11 laps before Mansell retook the lead; the Brazilian then spun on lap 14, dropping down to fifth.

As Prost passed Boutsen for third, Mansell began to have troubles with his gearbox. Berger passed him for the lead on lap 22 but then began to suffer handling issues, enabling Mansell to re-pass him on lap 28. Meanwhile, Prost closed up to both drivers, before passing Berger on lap 31 and then Mansell on lap 44 as the Englishman's gearbox issues worsened.

Mansell remained second until lap 56 when his gearbox failed altogether; he promptly threw his gloves into the crowd and announced his retirement from Formula One at the end of the season. Capelli briefly ran third ahead of Berger before his fuel pipe broke; Berger's race then ended four laps from home with a throttle failure. This left Prost to win by nearly 40 seconds from Boutsen, the Belgian driver in turn finishing four seconds ahead of Senna. Bernard, Piquet and Aguri Suzuki rounded out the top six.

At the halfway stage of the season, Prost led the Drivers' Championship by two points from Senna, 41 to 39, with Berger third with 25 points, Piquet fourth with 18 and Boutsen fifth with 17. McLaren led the Constructors' Championship with 64 points, followed by Ferrari on 54, Williams on 27 and Benetton on 25.

=== Race 9: Germany ===
At the start of the second half of the season, there was one change in pre-qualifying: Larrousse-Lola's five points meant that they were automatically promoted into main qualifying, dropping fellow French team Ligier into the Friday morning session. Meanwhile, Coloni had terminated their unsuccessful partnership with Subaru and were now using Cosworth engines, although these failed to improve the team's performance.

At the very fast, forested Hockenheimring, McLarens were 1–2 in qualifying, Senna ahead of Berger. Ferraris were 3–4 with Prost ahead of Mansell and Williamses were 5–6 to complete the "Noah's Ark" (two-by-two) formation, Patrese ahead of Boutsen. At the start, Berger took off better than Senna but Senna just stayed ahead with Berger second, Prost third, Mansell fourth, Patrese fifth and Piquet sixth.

There were no changes until lap 11 when Piquet tried to pass Patrese and went through an escape road, allowing Nannini to get ahead. Three laps later Mansell went through the grass at Ostkurve without losing a place but damaging his car. It proved crucial as he retired two laps later, the damage being too great. Meanwhile, Nannini passed Patrese as the top three stopped for tyres, the Williamses and Benettons planning to go without a stop. Piquet retired with engine trouble.

Thus, Nannini led Senna, Patrese, Piquet, Berger and Prost. Patrese's tyres were very badly damaged and he was forced to pit. Prost then passed Boutsen for fourth with Patrese following him two laps later. On lap 34, Senna passed Nannini for the lead and pulled away. Senna won from Nannini, Berger, Prost, Patrese and Boutsen.

=== Race 10: Hungary ===
Hungary was next and at the Hungaroring in Mogyoród, the Williamses qualified ahead of the McLarens, Boutsen taking pole ahead of Patrese, Berger, Senna, Mansell and Alesi. At the start, Boutsen kept the lead but it was Berger who got away best and passed Patrese while Senna was worse and lost out to both Mansell and Alesi. Thus, it was Boutsen, Berger, Patrese, Mansell, Alesi and Senna.

It stayed like that until lap 21 when Senna passed Alesi for fifth but he was forced to pit on the next lap with a slow puncture. Nannini soon passed Alesi to take fifth. The leaders stopped and Berger was the big loser with Nannini and Senna the big gainers, rising directly behind the Williams men. The order was: Boutsen, Patrese, Nannini, Senna, Mansell and Berger. Boutsen then pulled away while Patrese held up the others until Nannini streamed by with Senna following him.

Patrese then pitted and dropped behind Piquet as Berger passed Mansell only for Mansell to get back at him. Senna tried to pass Nannini on lap 64 and tipped Nannini into a spin and retirement. Berger tried to do the same thing on Mansell on lap 72 at the same corner with the same result – a collision but with both cars out. Boutsen won ahead of Senna, Piquet, Patrese, Warwick and Bernard.

=== Race 11: Belgium ===
The financially troubled Monteverdi Onyx team pulled out of F1 before the Belgian round, which allowed the Ligier team to escape from pre-qualifying. At the historic Spa-Francorchamps circuit, McLaren were 1–2 with Senna on pole ahead of Berger, Prost, Boutsen, Mansell and Patrese. At the start, Piquet pushed Mansell off the road and soon Nakajima and Modena collided as well, causing the race to be stopped.

At the second start, Senna took the lead while Boutsen sliced into second and Prost dropped to fifth. However, Paolo Barilla crashed his Minardi heavily at Eau Rouge, sending debris all over the track and causing the race to be stopped again.

The third start was clean and Senna took the lead ahead of Berger, Prost, Boutsen, Patrese and Nannini. On lap 11, Mansell went into the pits with handling problems; he went back out but retired eight laps later. On lap 14, Prost sliced ahead of Berger who then pitted for tyres. Senna and Prost, separated by 2 seconds stopped at the same time but then Nannini who was planning to go without stopping came in between them. Then both Patrese and Boutsen went out with gearbox troubles. Prost passed Nannini and Berger tried the same but this time Nannini came back at him to keep the place. On lap 41, Nannini went wide and Berger sailed through to take third. Senna duly won from Prost, Berger, Nannini, Piquet and Gugelmin.

With five races remaining, the Drivers' Championship now lay firmly between Senna with 63 points and Prost with 50. Berger was third with 33, Boutsen fourth with 27, and Piquet fifth with 24. McLaren held a comfortable lead in the Constructors' Championship with 96 points against Ferrari's 63, with Williams third with 42, and Benetton fourth with 40.

=== Race 12: Italy ===
After Belgium came Italy and at the historic Monza Autodrome near Milan, Senna took pole again with Prost second, Berger third, Mansell fourth, Alesi fifth and Boutsen sixth. At the start, Berger raced past Prost while Alesi was jumped by both the Ferraris. But Warwick crashed at the Parabolica, bringing out the red flags. In the restart, Berger got past Prost and Alesi repeated his previous effort and had passed both Ferraris before the second chicane, so we had Senna leading Berger, Alesi, Prost, Mansell and Boutsen.

On lap 5, Alesi spun off and retired. Nothing changed until lap 18 when Boutsen retired with a suspension failure and Berger's tyres began to fade. Prost then passed Berger and the stops did not change anything. The top three then began to battle for the lead but none were able to close in on the other while Mansell continued to drop back, fighting a faulty throttle return spring. Senna won from Prost, Berger, Mansell, Patrese and Nakajima.

=== Race 13: Portugal ===
In Portugal, at the Estoril circuit near Lisbon, the Ferraris took 1–2 in qualifying with Mansell ahead of Prost, Senna, Berger, Patrese and Piquet. At the start, Mansell got too much wheel spin and he slid across the track and almost took Prost out; as a result, the McLarens blasted by them with Piquet getting by Prost as well. The order was: Senna, Berger, Mansell, Piquet, Prost and Boutsen.

On lap 13, Prost overtook Piquet for fourth and later Mansell went to the grass, allowing Prost to take third. Mansell and Berger pitted soon as Prost passed Senna at the same time to lead. These two soon pitted as well with a shuffled order: Senna, Mansell, Berger, Prost, Nannini and Piquet. By then, the Ferraris started to close in on the McLarens in front of them. Behind them, Piquet passed Nannini to take fifth.

On lap 50, Mansell was close to Senna and passed him to lead. He pulled away fast but then hit Phillipe Alliot while lapping him, pushing the Ligier into a wall while Mansell got away with no damage. Prost then passed Berger on lap 59. Two laps later, Suzuki and Caffi collided and with the latter stuck in the cockpit in a zone with the wall next to the track, the race was stopped. Thus Mansell won from Senna, Prost, Berger, Piquet and Nannini.

=== Race 14: Spain ===
Qualifying in Spain, at the Jerez circuit near Seville, was marred by a serious incident involving Martin Donnelly. During a hot lap on the Friday, the Northern Irishman suffered a suspension failure on one of the fastest corners of the circuit, sending his Lotus into the barriers head-on. The car was destroyed while Donnelly was thrown across the track with his seat still strapped to his back; he suffered severe leg fractures and bruising on his brain and lungs. Remarkably, he survived, though his Formula One career was over.

Senna, shaken by this incident, took his 50th career pole position ahead of Prost, Mansell, Alesi, Berger and Patrese. At the start, Senna led away from Prost, while Alesi was hit by Patrese and spun into retirement. Mansell kept up with the championship challengers, while Berger struggled on hard tyres and held up the Williams and Benettons. The pit stops saw Mansell get ahead of Prost before waving his teammate through; he did so just as Senna was emerging from his own stop. The Brazilian, realising that he could not afford to be behind Mansell, dived ahead of him.

Piquet, who had not pitted, held a narrow lead over Prost; the Frenchman pressured him into running wide on lap 29, dropping him down to fourth. He eventually retired with battery problems. Senna began to struggle with a punctured radiator, and was passed by Mansell before dropping out on lap 54. Nannini was now up to third while Boutsen and Berger disputed fourth; the two tangled on lap 57, sending Berger into retirement. Prost and Mansell duly completed a Ferrari 1–2, the Frenchman 22 seconds ahead, with Nannini, Boutsen, Patrese and Suzuki completing the top six.

With two races to go, Senna had 78 points to Prost's 69; both had had eleven points finishes and would therefore have to drop points if they scored again. Senna was still in a strong position, however, as a win or a second place (if Prost did not win) in the next race would give him the championship. Berger was third with 40, Mansell was up to fourth with 31 and Boutsen was fifth with 30. Similarly, McLaren retained a strong position in the Constructors' Championship with 118 points against Ferrari's 100, with Williams a distant third with 49, and Benetton fourth with 47.

=== Race 15: Japan ===
Before the Japanese Grand Prix at Suzuka, Nannini was involved in a helicopter crash, suffering a severed right forearm. Though it was reattached using microsurgery, his F1 career ended. Meanwhile, the EuroBrun and Life teams withdrew (meaning that pre-qualifying was unnecessary); Benetton duly took on EuroBrun's Roberto Moreno as Nannini's replacement.

In qualifying, Senna took pole ahead of Prost, Mansell, Berger, Boutsen and Piquet. However, Senna was unhappy at the pole being located on the dirty side of the track and thus the second place being on the racing line which should give the second-placed driver the advantage into the first corner. He went to FISA president Jean Marie Balestre to change the side on which pole was located, but was refused. At the start, Prost did have the advantage and Senna attempted to dive into the narrowing gap left by the Frenchman, who drove the normal racing line. Senna's left front touched Prost's rear wing, spinning both of them into the gravel trap. The world championship was sealed.

Although Senna led by 9 points and there were 9 points for a win, if Prost won the last race he would have had to drop his fifth place in Canada which meant that he would be two points behind Senna even if Senna retired. Senna was the new world champion. In the race Berger was leading Mansell, Piquet, Moreno, Boutsen and Patrese. At the start of the second lap, Berger spun off into retirement after hitting debris from the Senna-Prost collision. This left Mansell who was under pressure by the Benettons leading.

Mansell then began to pull away from Piquet and Moreno as Suzuki passed Warwick for sixth. Mansell pitted with a 15-second lead on lap 27 for tyres but his driveshaft snapped as he went out of his garage. He retired giving the Constructors title to McLaren as they were 18 points ahead and a 1–2 could get only 15 points. The Benettons and Suzuki did not stop but Patrese and Boutsen did with Patrese getting ahead at the stops but both rejoined behind Suzuki. Then Nakajima passed Warwick to take sixth as Warwick then retired with gearbox trouble. Piquet won with Moreno making it a Benetton 1–2. Suzuki was third, Patrese fourth, Boutsen fifth and Nakajima sixth.

=== Race 16: Australia ===
The last race of the year was in Australia for what would be the 500th World Championship Grand Prix race, and at the Adelaide City street circuit the McLarens took 1–2 in qualifying ahead of the Ferraris, Senna ahead of Berger, Mansell, Prost, Alesi and Patrese. At the start, Senna took off into the lead with Berger defending from the Ferraris and Piquet getting by Alesi and Patrese. The order was: Senna, Berger, Mansell, Prost, Piquet and Alesi.

On lap 2, Berger accidentally hit the engine kill switch allowing Mansell to get ahead before he could bump start the McLaren. Then while defending from Prost, he held up Prost allowing Piquet to get ahead of the Frenchman. Piquet then soon passed Berger for third and the order settled down. Senna and Mansell continued to pull away from the rest, none of them able to keep up. Soon Patrese got past Alesi with Boutsen following suit.

Then, on lap 43, Mansell went up an escape road, giving Senna a good lead. Mansell was caught and passed by Piquet and pitted for tyres soon after. At the stops, Boutsen got ahead of Patrese. Berger then ran wide entering the Brabham straight, allowing Prost to take third. Mansell passed Berger on lap 57 and soon passed Prost on his new tyres. Senna had a gearbox glitch on lap 62 and went straight on into the wall and retired. Mansell closed in on Piquet, breaking the lap record 3 times towards the finish, taking 2 seconds a lap out of his lead. Piquet made an error with 4 laps to go, allowing Mansell to close right up. Mansell attacked on the last lap with a desperate passing attempt at the end of the straight, was too far behind to make the pass. Thus, Piquet won from Mansell, Prost, Berger, Boutsen and Patrese.

At the end of the season, Senna was world champion with 78 points with Prost second with 71 (he got 73 but had to drop 2 points), Piquet third with 43 (he got 44 but had to drop 1 point), Berger fourth with 43 (Piquet had 2 wins to Berger's none), Mansell fifth with 37, Boutsen sixth with 34, Patrese seventh with 23 and Nannini eighth with 21. In the constructors, McLaren were champions with 121 points with Ferrari second with 110, Benetton third with 71 and Williams fourth with 55.

== Results and standings ==
=== Grands Prix ===
Round	Grand Prix	Pole position	Fastest lap	Winning driver	Winning constructor	Report
1	United States Grand Prix	(Austria) Gerhard Berger	(Austria) Gerhard Berger	(Brazil) Ayrton Senna	(United Kingdom) McLaren-Honda	Report
2	(Brazil) Brazilian Grand Prix	(Brazil) Ayrton Senna	(Austria) Gerhard Berger	(France) Alain Prost	(Italy) Ferrari	Report
3	(Italy) San Marino Grand Prix	(Brazil) Ayrton Senna	(Italy) Alessandro Nannini	(Italy) Riccardo Patrese	(United Kingdom) Williams-Renault	Report
4	Monaco Grand Prix	(Brazil) Ayrton Senna	(Brazil) Ayrton Senna	(Brazil) Ayrton Senna	(United Kingdom) McLaren-Honda	Report
5	(Canada) Canadian Grand Prix	(Brazil) Ayrton Senna	(Austria) Gerhard Berger	(Brazil) Ayrton Senna (Note: Gerhard Berger originally won the race, but later received a one-minute time penalty for jump start. Ayrton Senna, initially classified second, inherited the win.)	(United Kingdom) McLaren-Honda	Report
6	(Mexico) Mexican Grand Prix	(Austria) Gerhard Berger	(France) Alain Prost	(France) Alain Prost	(Italy) Ferrari	Report
7	(France) French Grand Prix	(United Kingdom) Nigel Mansell	(United Kingdom) Nigel Mansell	(France) Alain Prost	(Italy) Ferrari	Report
8	(United Kingdom) British Grand Prix	(United Kingdom) Nigel Mansell	(United Kingdom) Nigel Mansell	(France) Alain Prost	(Italy) Ferrari	Report
9	(West Germany) German Grand Prix	(Brazil) Ayrton Senna	(Belgium) Thierry Boutsen	(Brazil) Ayrton Senna	(United Kingdom) McLaren-Honda	Report
10	(Hungary) Hungarian Grand Prix	(Belgium) Thierry Boutsen	(Italy) Riccardo Patrese	(Belgium) Thierry Boutsen	(United Kingdom) Williams-Renault	Report
11	(Belgium) Belgian Grand Prix	(Brazil) Ayrton Senna	(France) Alain Prost	(Brazil) Ayrton Senna	(United Kingdom) McLaren-Honda	Report
12	(Italy) Italian Grand Prix	(Brazil) Ayrton Senna	(Brazil) Ayrton Senna	(Brazil) Ayrton Senna	(United Kingdom) McLaren-Honda	Report
13	(Portugal) Portuguese Grand Prix	(United Kingdom) Nigel Mansell	(Italy) Riccardo Patrese	(United Kingdom) Nigel Mansell	(Italy) Ferrari	Report
14	(Spain) Spanish Grand Prix	(Brazil) Ayrton Senna	(Italy) Riccardo Patrese	(France) Alain Prost	(Italy) Ferrari	Report
15	(Japan) Japanese Grand Prix	(Brazil) Ayrton Senna	(Italy) Riccardo Patrese	(Brazil) Nelson Piquet	(United Kingdom) Benetton-Ford	Report
16	(Australia) Australian Grand Prix	(Brazil) Ayrton Senna	(United Kingdom) Nigel Mansell	(Brazil) Nelson Piquet	(United Kingdom) Benetton-Ford	Report

=== Scoring system ===
Points were awarded to the top six classified finishers. For the Drivers' Championship, the best eleven results were counted, while, for the Constructors' Championship, all rounds were counted.

Numbers without parentheses are championship points; numbers in parentheses are total points scored. Points were awarded in the following system:

Position	1st	2nd	3rd	4th	5th	6th
Race	9	6	4	3	2	1

=== World Drivers' Championship standings ===
Pos.	Driver	USA (United States)	BRA (Brazil)	SMR (Italy)	MON (Monaco)	CAN (Canada)	MEX (Mexico)	FRA (France)	GBR (United Kingdom)	GER (West Germany)	HUN (Hungary)	BEL (Belgium)	ITA (Italy)	POR (Portugal)	ESP (Spain)	JPN (Japan)	AUS (Australia)	Points (Note: Only the best 11 results counted towards the Drivers' Championship. Numbers without parentheses are championship points; numbers in parentheses are total points scored.)
1	(Brazil) Ayrton Senna	1	3^{P}	Ret^{P}	1^{P}^{F}	1^{P}	20^{†}	3	3	1^{P}	2	1^{P}	1^{P}^{F}	2	Ret^{P}	Ret^{P}	Ret^{P}	78
2	(France) Alain Prost	Ret	1	4	Ret	(5)	1^{F}	1	1	4	Ret	2^{F}	2	3	1	Ret	3	71 (73)
3	(Brazil) Nelson Piquet	4	(6)	5	DSQ	2	6	4	5	Ret	3	5	7	5	Ret	1	1	43 (44)
4	(Austria) Gerhard Berger	Ret^{P}^{F}	2^{F}	2	3	4^{F}	3^{P}	5	14^{†}	3	16^{†}	3	3	4	Ret	Ret	4	43
5	(United Kingdom) Nigel Mansell	Ret	4	Ret	Ret	3	2	18^{P}^{F}^{†}	Ret^{P}^{F}	Ret	17^{†}	Ret	4	1^{P}	2	Ret	2^{F}	37
6	(Belgium) Thierry Boutsen	3	5	Ret	4	Ret	5	Ret	2	6^{F}	1^{P}	Ret	Ret	Ret	4	5	5	34
7	(Italy) Riccardo Patrese	9	13^{†}	1	Ret	Ret	9	6	Ret	5	4^{F}	Ret	5	7^{F}	5^{F}	4^{F}	6	23
8	(Italy) Alessandro Nannini	11	10^{†}	3^{F}	Ret	Ret	4	16^{†}	Ret	2	Ret	4	8	6	3			21
9	(France) Jean Alesi	2	7	6	2	Ret	7	Ret	8	11^{†}	Ret	8	Ret	8	Ret	DNS	8	13
10 (Note: Results published in the 1991 FIA Yearbook of Automobile Sport show Capelli and Moreno as equal 10th in the Drivers' Championship.)	(Italy) Ivan Capelli	Ret	DNQ	Ret	Ret	10	DNQ	2	Ret	7	Ret	7	Ret	Ret	Ret	Ret	Ret	6
=	(Brazil) Roberto Moreno	13	DNPQ	Ret	DNQ	DNQ	EX	DNPQ	DNPQ	DNPQ	DNPQ	DNPQ	DNPQ	DNPQ	DNPQ	2	7	6
12	(Japan) Aguri Suzuki	Ret	Ret	Ret	Ret	12	Ret	7	6	Ret	Ret	Ret	Ret	14^{†}	6	3	Ret	6
13	(France) Éric Bernard	8	Ret	13^{†}	6	9	Ret	8	4	Ret	6	9	Ret	Ret	Ret	Ret	Ret	5
14	(United Kingdom) Derek Warwick	Ret	Ret	7	Ret	6	10	11	Ret	8	5	11	Ret	Ret	Ret	Ret	Ret	3
15	(Japan) Satoru Nakajima	6	8	Ret	Ret	11	Ret	Ret	Ret	Ret	Ret	Ret	6	DNS	Ret	6	Ret	3
16 (Note: Results published in the 1991 FIA Yearbook of Automobile Sport show Modena and Caffi as equal 16th in the Drivers' Championship.)	(Italy) Alex Caffi		Ret	DNQ	5	8	DNQ	Ret	7	9	9	10	9	13^{†}		9	DNQ	2
=	(Italy) Stefano Modena	5	Ret	Ret	Ret	7	11	13	9	Ret	Ret	17^{†}	Ret	Ret	Ret	Ret	12	2
18	(Brazil) Maurício Gugelmin	14	DNQ	Ret	DNQ	DNQ	DNQ	Ret	DNS	Ret	8	6	Ret	12	8	Ret	Ret	1
—	(Italy) Nicola Larini	Ret	11	10	Ret	Ret	16	14	10	10	11	14	11	10	7	7	10	0
—	(United Kingdom) Martin Donnelly	DNS	Ret	8	Ret	Ret	8	12	Ret	Ret	7	12	Ret	Ret	DNS			0
—	(Italy) Pierluigi Martini	7	9	DNS	Ret	Ret	12	Ret	Ret	Ret	Ret	15	Ret	11	Ret	8	9	0
—	(Switzerland) Gregor Foitek	Ret	Ret	Ret	7^{†}	Ret	15	DNQ	DNQ	Ret	DNQ							0
—	(France) Philippe Alliot	EX	12	9	Ret	Ret	18	9	13	DSQ	14	DNQ	13	Ret	Ret	10	11	0
—	(Italy) Michele Alboreto	10	Ret	DNQ	DNQ	Ret	17	10	Ret	Ret	12	13	12^{†}	9	10	Ret	DNQ	0
—	(France) Yannick Dalmas	DNPQ	Ret	DNPQ	DNPQ	DNPQ	DNPQ	17	DNPQ	DNQ	DNQ	DNQ	NC	Ret	9	DNQ	DNQ	0
—	(Italy) Emanuele Pirro			Ret	Ret	Ret	Ret	Ret	11	Ret	10	Ret	Ret	15	Ret	Ret	Ret	0
—	(Italy) Andrea de Cesaris	Ret	Ret	Ret	Ret	Ret	13	DSQ	Ret	DNQ	Ret	Ret	10	Ret	Ret	Ret	Ret	0
—	(Italy) Paolo Barilla	Ret	Ret	11	Ret	DNQ	14	DNQ	12	DNQ	15	Ret	DNQ	DNQ	DNQ			0
—	(Finland) JJ Lehto	DNQ	DNQ	12	Ret	Ret	Ret	DNQ	DNQ	NC	DNQ							0
—	(West Germany) Bernd Schneider	12													DNQ			0
—	(France) Olivier Grouillard	Ret	Ret	Ret	DNQ	13	19	DNPQ	DNQ	DNQ	DNPQ	16	Ret	DNQ	Ret	DNQ	13	0
—	(Italy) Gabriele Tarquini	DNPQ	DNPQ	DNPQ	DNPQ	DNPQ	DNPQ	DNQ	Ret	DNPQ	13	DNQ	DNQ	DNQ	Ret	DNQ	Ret	0
—	(Italy) Gianni Morbidelli	DNQ	14													Ret	Ret	0
—	(Australia) David Brabham			DNQ	Ret	DNQ	Ret	15	DNQ	Ret	DNQ	Ret	DNQ	Ret	DNQ	Ret	Ret	0
—	(United Kingdom) Johnny Herbert															Ret	Ret	0
—	(Belgium) Bertrand Gachot	DNPQ	DNPQ	DNPQ	DNPQ	DNPQ	DNPQ	DNPQ	DNPQ	DNPQ	DNPQ	DNQ	DNQ	DNQ	DNQ	DNQ	DNQ	0
—	(Sweden) Stefan Johansson	DNQ	DNQ															0
—	(Italy) Claudio Langes	DNPQ	DNPQ	DNPQ	DNPQ	DNPQ	DNPQ	DNPQ	DNPQ	DNPQ	DNPQ	DNPQ	DNPQ	DNPQ	DNPQ			0
—	(Italy) Bruno Giacomelli			DNPQ	DNPQ	DNPQ	DNPQ	DNPQ	DNPQ	DNPQ	DNPQ	DNPQ	DNPQ	DNPQ	DNPQ			0
—	(Australia) Gary Brabham	DNPQ	DNPQ															0
Pos.	Driver	USA (United States)	BRA (Brazil)	SMR (Italy)	MON (Monaco)	CAN (Canada)	MEX (Mexico)	FRA (France)	GBR (United Kingdom)	GER (West Germany)	HUN (Hungary)	BEL (Belgium)	ITA (Italy)	POR (Portugal)	ESP (Spain)	JPN (Japan)	AUS (Australia)	Points

Key
Colour	Result
Gold	Winner
Silver	Second place
Bronze	Third place
Green	Other points position
Blue	Other classified position
Blue	Not classified, finished (NC)
Purple	Not classified, retired (Ret)
Red	Did not qualify (DNQ)
Red	Did not pre-qualify (DNPQ)
Black	Disqualified (DSQ)
White	Did not start (DNS)
White	Race cancelled (C)
Blank	Did not practice (DNP)
Blank	Excluded (EX)
Blank	Did not arrive (DNA)
Blank	Withdrawn (WD)
Blank	Did not enter (empty cell)
Annotation	Meaning
P	Pole position
F	Fastest lap
†	Did not finish, but classified for completing over 90% of the race distance

Notes:

- † – Driver did not finish the Grand Prix but was classified, as he completed more than 90% of the race distance.

=== World Constructors' Championship standings ===
Pos.	Constructor	No.	USA (United States)	BRA (Brazil)	SMR (Italy)	MON (Monaco)	CAN (Canada)	MEX (Mexico)	FRA (France)	GBR (United Kingdom)	GER (West Germany)	HUN (Hungary)	BEL (Belgium)	ITA (Italy)	POR (Portugal)	ESP (Spain)	JPN (Japan)	AUS (Australia)	Points
1	(United Kingdom) McLaren-Honda	27	1	3^{P}	Ret^{P}	1^{P}^{F}	1^{P}	20^{†}	3	3	1^{P}	2	1^{P}	1^{P}^{F}	2	Ret^{P}	Ret^{P}	Ret^{P}	121
1	(United Kingdom) McLaren-Honda	28	Ret^{P}^{F}	2^{F}	2	3	4^{F}	3^{P}	5	14^{†}	3	16^{†}	3	3	4	Ret	Ret	4	121
2	(Italy) Ferrari	1	Ret	1	4	Ret	5	1^{F}	1	1	4	Ret	2^{F}	2	3	1	Ret	3	110
2	(Italy) Ferrari	2	Ret	4	Ret	Ret	3	2	18^{P}^{F}^{†}	Ret^{P}^{F}	Ret	17^{†}	Ret	4	1^{P}	2	Ret	2^{F}	110
3	(United Kingdom) Benetton-Ford	19	11	10^{†}	3^{F}	Ret	Ret	4	16^{†}	Ret	2	Ret	4	8	6	3	2	7	71
3	(United Kingdom) Benetton-Ford	20	4	6	5	DSQ	2	6	4	5	Ret	3	5	7	5	Ret	1	1	71
4	(United Kingdom) Williams-Renault	5	3	5	Ret	4	Ret	5	Ret	2	6^{F}	1^{P}	Ret	Ret	Ret	4	5	5	57
4	(United Kingdom) Williams-Renault	6	9	13^{†}	1	Ret	Ret	9	6	Ret	5	4^{F}	Ret	5	7^{F}	5^{F}	4^{F}	6	57
5	(United Kingdom) Tyrrell-Ford	3	6	8	Ret	Ret	11	Ret	Ret	Ret	Ret	Ret	Ret	6	DNS	Ret	6	Ret	16
5	(United Kingdom) Tyrrell-Ford	4	2	7	6	2	Ret	7	Ret	8	11^{†}	Ret	8	Ret	8	Ret	DNS	8	16
6	(United Kingdom) Lola-Lamborghini (Note: Results published in 1991 FIA Yearbook of Automobile Sport credit sixth place to "Larrousse" rather than "Lola".)	29	8	Ret	13^{†}	6	9	Ret	8	4	Ret	6	9	Ret	Ret	Ret	Ret	Ret	11
6	(United Kingdom) Lola-Lamborghini	30	Ret	Ret	Ret	Ret	12	Ret	7	6	Ret	Ret	Ret	Ret	14^{†}	6	3	Ret	11
7	(United Kingdom) Leyton House-Judd	15	14	DNQ	Ret	DNQ	DNQ	DNQ	Ret	DNS	Ret	8	6	Ret	12	8	Ret	Ret	7
7	(United Kingdom) Leyton House-Judd	16	Ret	DNQ	Ret	Ret	10	DNQ	2	Ret	7	Ret	7	Ret	Ret	Ret	Ret	Ret	7
8	(United Kingdom) Lotus-Lamborghini	11	Ret	Ret	7	Ret	6	10	11	Ret	8	5	11	Ret	Ret	Ret	Ret	Ret	3
8	(United Kingdom) Lotus-Lamborghini	12	DNS	Ret	8	Ret	Ret	8	12	Ret	Ret	7	12	Ret	Ret	DNS	Ret	Ret	3
9	(United Kingdom) Brabham-Judd	7	Ret	Ret	DNQ	Ret	DNQ	Ret	15	DNQ	Ret	DNQ	Ret	DNQ	Ret	DNQ	Ret	Ret	2
9	(United Kingdom) Brabham-Judd	8	5	Ret	Ret	Ret	7	11	13	9	Ret	Ret	17^{†}	Ret	Ret	Ret	Ret	12	2
=	(United Kingdom) Arrows-Ford	9	10	Ret	DNQ	DNQ	Ret	17	10	Ret	Ret	12	13	12^{†}	9	10	Ret	DNQ	2
=	(United Kingdom) Arrows-Ford	10	12	Ret	DNQ	5	8	DNQ	Ret	7	9	9	10	9	13^{†}	DNQ	9	DNQ	2
—	(France) Ligier-Ford	25	Ret	11	10	Ret	Ret	16	14	10	10	11	14	11	10	7	7	10	0
—	(France) Ligier-Ford	26	EX	12	9	Ret	Ret	18	9	13	DSQ	14	DNQ	13	Ret	Ret	10	11	0
—	(Italy) Minardi-Ford	23	7	9	DNS	Ret	Ret	12	Ret	Ret	Ret	Ret	15	Ret	11	Ret	8	9	0
—	(Italy) Minardi-Ford	24	Ret	Ret	11	Ret	DNQ	14	DNQ	12	DNQ	15	Ret	DNQ	DNQ	DNQ	Ret	Ret	0
—	(United Kingdom) Onyx-Ford	35	DNQ	DNQ	Ret	7^{†}	Ret	15	DNQ	DNQ	Ret	DNQ							0
—	(United Kingdom) Onyx-Ford	36	DNQ	DNQ	12	Ret	Ret	Ret	DNQ	DNQ	NC	DNQ							0
—	(France) AGS-Ford	17	DNPQ	DNPQ	DNPQ	DNPQ	DNPQ	DNPQ	DNQ	Ret	DNPQ	13	DNQ	DNQ	DNQ	Ret	DNQ	Ret	0
—	(France) AGS-Ford	18	DNPQ	Ret	DNPQ	DNPQ	DNPQ	DNPQ	17	DNPQ	DNQ	DNQ	DNQ	Ret	Ret	9	DNQ	DNQ	0
—	(Italy) Dallara-Ford	21	DNQ	14	Ret	Ret	Ret	Ret	Ret	11	Ret	10	Ret	Ret	15	Ret	Ret	Ret	0
—	(Italy) Dallara-Ford	22	Ret	Ret	Ret	Ret	Ret	13	DSQ	Ret	DNQ	Ret	Ret	10	Ret	Ret	Ret	Ret	0
—	(Italy) Osella-Ford	14	Ret	Ret	Ret	DNQ	13	19	DNPQ	DNQ	DNQ	DNPQ	16	Ret	DNQ	Ret	DNQ	13	0
—	(Italy) EuroBrun-Judd	33	13	DNPQ	Ret	DNQ	DNQ	EX	DNPQ	DNPQ	DNPQ	DNPQ	DNPQ	DNPQ	DNPQ	DNPQ			0
—	(Italy) EuroBrun-Judd	34	DNPQ	DNPQ	DNPQ	DNPQ	DNPQ	DNPQ	DNPQ	DNPQ	DNPQ	DNPQ	DNPQ	DNPQ	DNPQ	DNPQ			0
—	(Italy) Coloni-Ford	31									DNPQ	DNPQ	DNQ	DNQ	DNQ	DNQ	DNQ	DNQ	0
—	(Italy) Life	39	DNPQ	DNPQ	DNPQ	DNPQ	DNPQ	DNPQ	DNPQ	DNPQ	DNPQ	DNPQ	DNPQ	DNPQ					0
—	(Italy) Coloni-Subaru	31	DNPQ	DNPQ	DNPQ	DNPQ	DNPQ	DNPQ	DNPQ	DNPQ									0
—	(Italy) Life-Judd	39													DNPQ	DNPQ			0
Pos.	Constructor	No.	USA (United States)	BRA (Brazil)	SMR (Italy)	MON (Monaco)	CAN (Canada)	MEX (Mexico)	FRA (France)	GBR (United Kingdom)	GER (West Germany)	HUN (Hungary)	BEL (Belgium)	ITA (Italy)	POR (Portugal)	ESP (Spain)	JPN (Japan)	AUS (Australia)	Points

Notes:

- † – Driver did not finish the Grand Prix but was classified, as he completed more than 90% of the race distance.

== Non-championship event results ==
The 1990 season also included a single event which did not count towards the World Championship, the Formula One Indoor Trophy at the Bologna Motor Show.

Race name	Venue	Date	Winning driver	Constructor	Report
(Italy) Formula One Indoor Trophy	Bologna Motor Show	8–9 December	(Italy) Gianni Morbidelli	(Italy) Minardi	Report
