= Ligier JS37 =

Formula One car

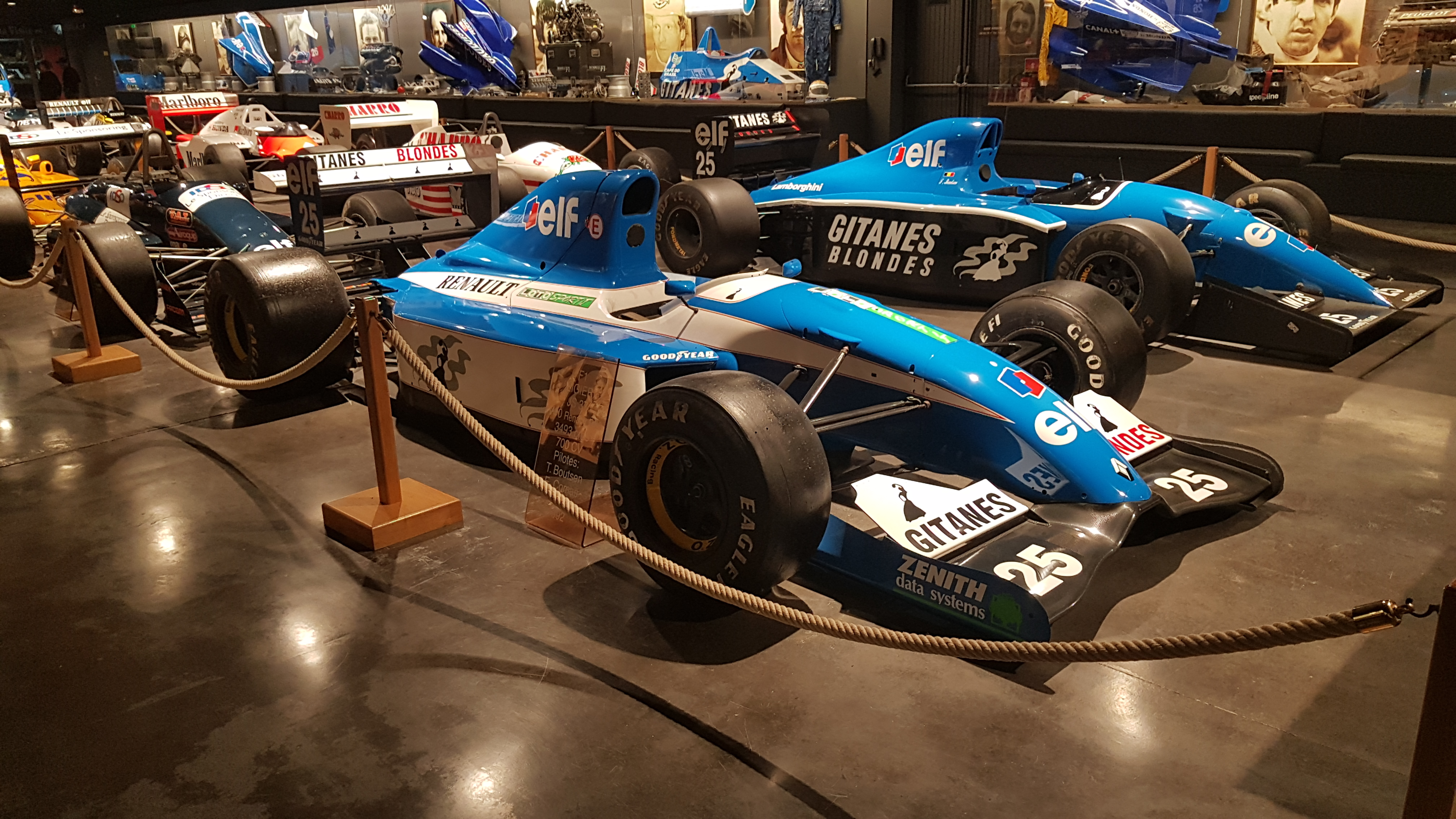
- Category: Formula One
- Constructor: Ligier
- Designers: Frank Dernie (designer); Gérard Ducarouge (technical director)
- Predecessor: Ligier JS35
- Successor: Ligier JS39

Technical specifications
- Chassis: Carbon fibre monocoque
- Axle track: Front: 1,680 mm (66 in); Rear: 1,800 mm (71 in)
- Wheelbase: 2,900 mm (110 in)
- Engine: Renault RS3C, 3,493 cc (213.2 cu in), V10, NA, mid-engine, longitudinally mounted
- Transmission: Ligier/XTrac, 6-speed
- Weight: 505 kg (1,113 lb)
- Fuel: Elf
- Tyres: Goodyear

Competition history
- Notable entrants: Ligier Gitanes Blondes
- Notable drivers: 25. (Belgium) Thierry Boutsen; 26. (France) Érik Comas
- Debut: 1992 South African Grand Prix
- Last event: 1992 Australian Grand Prix
Races	Wins	Poles	F/Laps
16	0	0	0

The Ligier JS37 was a Formula One car designed by Frank Dernie and Gérard Ducarouge for use by the Ligier team in the 1992 Formula One World Championship. The car was powered by the Renault RS3 V10 engine and ran on Goodyear tyres. It was driven by Belgian Thierry Boutsen and Frenchman Érik Comas, both in their second season with the team.

First raced in the South African Grand Prix, the JS37's best finish was two 5th places, one achieved by Comas at the French Grand Prix and the other by Boutsen at the Australian Grand Prix.

== Design and development ==
For the 1992 season, team owner Guy Ligier secured the use of the Renault RS3 3.5 V10 engine, maintained by Mecachrome at a cost of $12 million. The team initially used the RS3B model, before being upgraded to a supply of RS3Cs later in the year, from the Hungarian Grand Prix onwards. The engine was rated as having 770 brake horsepower at 14,200 revolutions per minute.

The JS37 was designed by Frank Dernie with Gérard Ducarouge, who had joined Ligier in August 1991, as technical director. The monocoque chassis was of carbon fibre and provided with a Ligier/Xtrac six-speed transverse gearbox. The JS37 was configured with double wishbone pushrod suspension having twin Bilstein dampers, front and rear. Brakes were by AP with Carbone Industrie pads. The steering was of a Ligier design and the car ran on Goodyear tyres. Its wheelbase was 2,880 millimetres (113.4 in), the front track was 1,800 millimetres (70.9 in) while the rear track was 1,680 millimetres (66.1 in). The capacity of the fuel tank was 220 litres (48.4 imp gal) and fuel and oil was supplied by Elf. The overall weight of the car was 505 kilograms (1,113.3 lb).

Presented in a largely blue colour with white sidepods, the JS37 carried sponsorship from cigarette brand Gitanes Blondes, Loto Sportif and Elf. Although aesthetically pleasing, the JS37 was poor aerodynamically and needed to be revised during the season, as did the suspension. These changes helped improve the handling, the car otherwise performing poorly on bumpy circuits.

== Race history ==
Prior to the start of the season, Alain Prost test drove the JS37 several times with a view to joining the team after his dismissal from Ferrari the previous year. However, he opted out of racing with the team and Érik Comas, Ligier's junior driver who had raced for the team the previous year, drove instead. Thierry Boutsen continued with the team having also driven for it during the 1991 season.

The JS37 made its debut at the first race of the 1992 season at the South African Grand Prix, qualifying 13th (Comas) and 14th (Boutsen) fastest. In the race itself, the drivers were running in 7th and 8th place, Comas ahead of Boutsen, by lap 41. However, the latter retired his car on lap 61 with electrical problems. Comas went on to finish in 7th. The car struggled for grip at the next race, Comas qualifying in 26th and last place while Boutsen started from 22nd on the grid. Both cars finished the race, although two laps down, in 9th (Comas) and 10th (Boutsen).

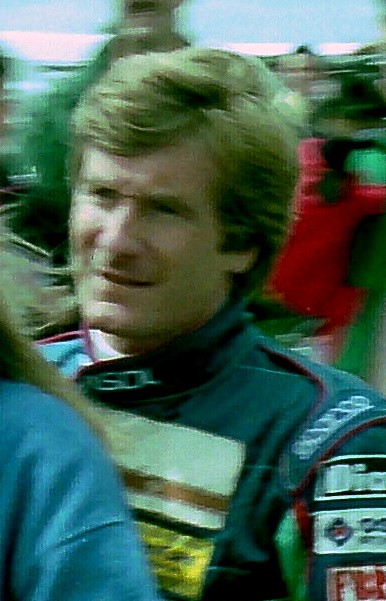
Ligier driver Thierry Boutsen finished a best of 5th in the Ligier JS37, in Australia

At the Brazilian Grand Prix, Boutsen qualified in 10th, benefiting from new front wings and an undertray. Comas placed 15th on the grid. During the race, at one point both cars were running in the points prior to stopping for tyres. The teammates collided on lap 37 while Comas was attempting to overtake Lotus driver Johnny Herbert. Boutsen retired but Comas was able to carry for a few more laps before retiring with engine problems. The following race in Spain saw Comas taking 10th place on the starting grid, four places ahead of Boutsen. Both drivers retired from the race, Boutsen with engine problems and Comas from driver error.

At San Marino, Boutsen qualified 10th and was holding this position in the race when he retired with an engine problem. He had run as high as 7th. Comas struggled for grip during the race but finished in 9th, two laps down on the winner, having started from 13th. The team did little better at the next race in Monaco, still plagued with a lack of grip. Boutsen noted that he was able go around some corners at the circuit faster in his Vespa scooter. Boutsen and Comas qualified in 22nd and 23rd respectively and placed 12th and 10th in the race.

Grip was still a problem for the team at the Canadian race, where Boutsen again out-qualified Comas, placing 21st, one place ahead of his teammate. However, Comas had the better race and, aided by attrition, finished in 6th place. It was the team's first point in 48 races as well as Comas' first career points. Boutsen finished in 10th, two laps down. At the team's home race, the French Grand Prix, Comas enjoyed further success, finishing in 5th after qualifying in 10th place on the grid. Boutsen, having qualified in 9th, was running in the points ahead of Comas but spun his car and was unable to restart.

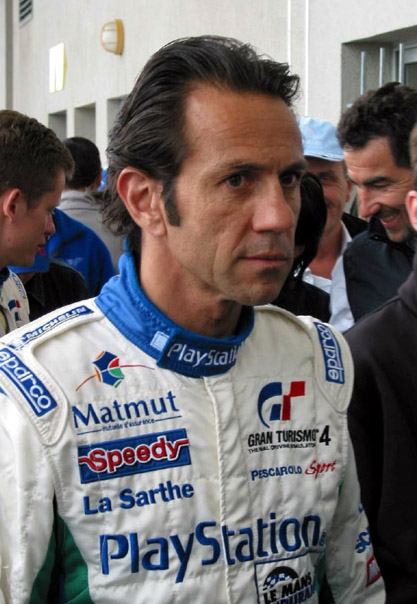
The other Ligier driver for 1992 was Erik Comas, who had a best place with the JS37 of 5th at the French Grand Prix

At the British Grand Prix, Comas qualified in 10th while Boutsen was 13th on the grid. On race day, both cars finished although out of the points, in 8th (Comas) and 10th (Boutsen). Comas scored another point at the following race in Germany for 6th place, having started from 7th on the grid. Boutsen was just behind in 7th place, having started one place behind his teammate on the grid. In Hungary, the team's drivers collided on the first lap of the race putting them both out. It was unfortunate, as they had a good qualifying session in which the JS37 benefited from the installation of upgraded Renault RS3C engines, qualifying in 8th (Boutsen) and 11th (Comas).

Comas failed to qualify for the Belgian Grand Prix, after a heavy crash in practice on the Friday of the race. Knocked unconscious, he did not participate any further in the race weekend. Boutsen had his best qualifying session of the year to date, placing 7th on the grid. However, he spun out into a barrier during the race, damaging the car, after prematurely switching to slick tires after running wets during the rainy conditions that dominated the early stages of the race. Boutsen had another good qualifying session at the Italian race, placing 8th in the grid in his 150th Grand Prix. In the race he ran as high as 5th, but experience problems with the fuel system and had to retire on lap 41. Comas returned to race duty by qualifying in 15th and was holding 7th in the race when he spun out.

In Portugal, Boutsen qualified in 11th and Comas in 14th. While Comas retired from 8th place late in the race after over-revving his engine led to it blowing up, Boutsen took over the position which is where he finished the race. At the Japanese Grand Prix, Comas placed 8th on the grid but retired from the race after another engine failure while running in 7th towards the end of the race. Boutsen also retired, on lap 3 with gearbox problems, having qualified in 10th.

At the final race of the year, the Australian Grand Prix, Comas started from 9th on the grid and was holding that position in the race when he retired on lap 5 with a broken gearbox. Despite his poor qualifying in which he was 22nd fastest, Boutsen finished in a points paying position, in 5th place.

Comas placed 11th in the 1992 Driver's Championship with four points, while Boutsen's two points placed him equal 14th, alongside Lotus' Johnny Herbert and Scuderia Italia's Pierluigi Martini. Ligier's total of six points saw it finish joint 7th in the Constructor's Championship, alongside Footwork Arrows.

== Complete Formula One results ==
(key) (results in bold indicate pole position; results in italics indicate fastest lap)

Year	Entrant	Engine	Tyres	Drivers	1	2	3	4	5	6	7	8	9	10	11	12	13	14	15	16	Points	WCC
1992	Ligier Gitanes Blondes	Renault V10	**G**		RSA	MEX	BRA	ESP	SMR	MON	CAN	FRA	GBR	GER	HUN	BEL	ITA	POR	JPN	AUS	**6**	**7th=**
1992	Ligier Gitanes Blondes	Renault V10	**G**	Thierry Boutsen	Ret	10	Ret	Ret	Ret	12	10	Ret	10	7	Ret	Ret	Ret	8	Ret	5	**6**	**7th=**
1992	Ligier Gitanes Blondes	Renault V10	**G**	Érik Comas	7	9	Ret	Ret	9	10	6	5	8	6	Ret	DNQ	Ret	Ret	Ret	Ret	**6**	**7th=**
