= Équipe Ligier =

French racing team

(France) Ligier
- Full name: Équipe Ligier
- Base: Vichy (1976–1988) and Magny-Cours (1989–1996), France
- Founder(s): Guy Ligier
- Noted staff: Ken Anderson; Loïc Bigois; Flavio Briatore; Cyril de Rouvre; Frank Dernie; Richard Divila; Gérard Ducarouge; Claude Galopin; Tom Walkinshaw
- Noted drivers: (France) Jacques Laffite (France) Patrick Depailler (Belgium) Jacky Ickx (France) Didier Pironi (United States) Eddie Cheever (Italy) Andrea de Cesaris (France) René Arnoux (Sweden) Stefan Johansson (Belgium) Thierry Boutsen (United Kingdom) Martin Brundle (United Kingdom) Mark Blundell (Japan) Aguri Suzuki (France) Olivier Panis (France) Érik Comas
- Next name: Prost Grand Prix

Formula One World Championship career
- First entry: 1976 Brazilian Grand Prix
- Races entered: 332 entries (326 starts)
- Engines: Matra, Ford-Cosworth, Renault, Megatron, Judd, Lamborghini, Mugen-Honda
- Constructors' Championships: 0 (best finish: 2nd, 1980)
- Drivers' Championships: 0 (best finish: 4th, 1979-81, Jacques Laffite)
- Race victories: 9
- Podiums: 50
- Points: 388
- Pole positions: 9
- Fastest laps: 10
- Final entry: 1996 Japanese Grand Prix

Équipe Ligier (French: [e.kip li.ʒje]) is a motorsport team, best known for its Formula One team that operated from 1976 to 1996. The team was founded in 1968 by French former rugby union player and former Formula One driver Guy Ligier as a sports car manufacturer.

== Sports car origins ==
After retiring from racing following the death of his friend Jo Schlesser, Guy Ligier decided to found his own team and had engineer Michel Têtu develop a sports car named JS1 (Schlesser's initials). The Cosworth-powered JS1 took wins at Albi and Montlhéry in 1970, but retired at Le Mans and from the Tour Automobile de France.

For 1971, Ligier had the JS1 developed into the JS2 and JS3. The JS2 was homologated for road use and used a Maserati V6 engine, while the JS3 was an open-top sports-prototype powered by a Cosworth DFV V8 engine. The JS3 won at Montlhéry in 1971 but failed to finish the minimum distance at Le Mans. Therefore, it was retired, and Ligier installed the Cosworth DFV in the JS2 road car, finishing second overall at Le Mans in 1975. Guy Ligier then switched his efforts into Formula One.

== Formula One ==
After the departure of Matra at the end of the 1972 season, no French constructor competed in Formula One for three seasons until Ligier's arrival at the start of the 1976 season. Following the acquisition of the Matra F1 team's assets, Ligier entered Formula One with a single Matra V12-powered car, and won the 1977 Swedish Grand Prix with Jacques Laffite. This is generally considered to have been the first all-French victory in the Formula One World Championship as well as the first Formula One victory for a French-licensed team and a French engine.

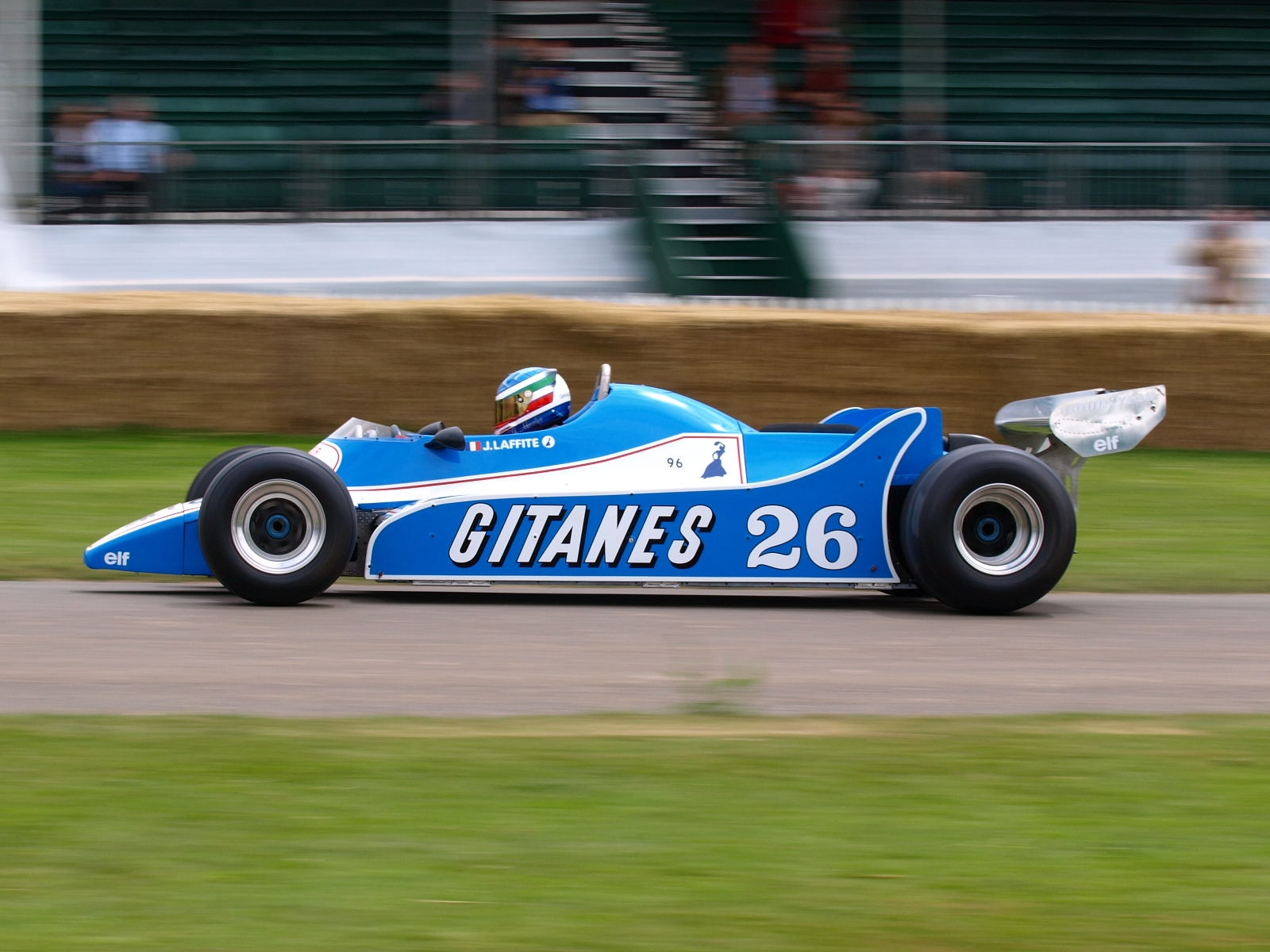
The 1980 Ligier JS11/15 being demonstrated at the 2008 Goodwood Festival of Speed.

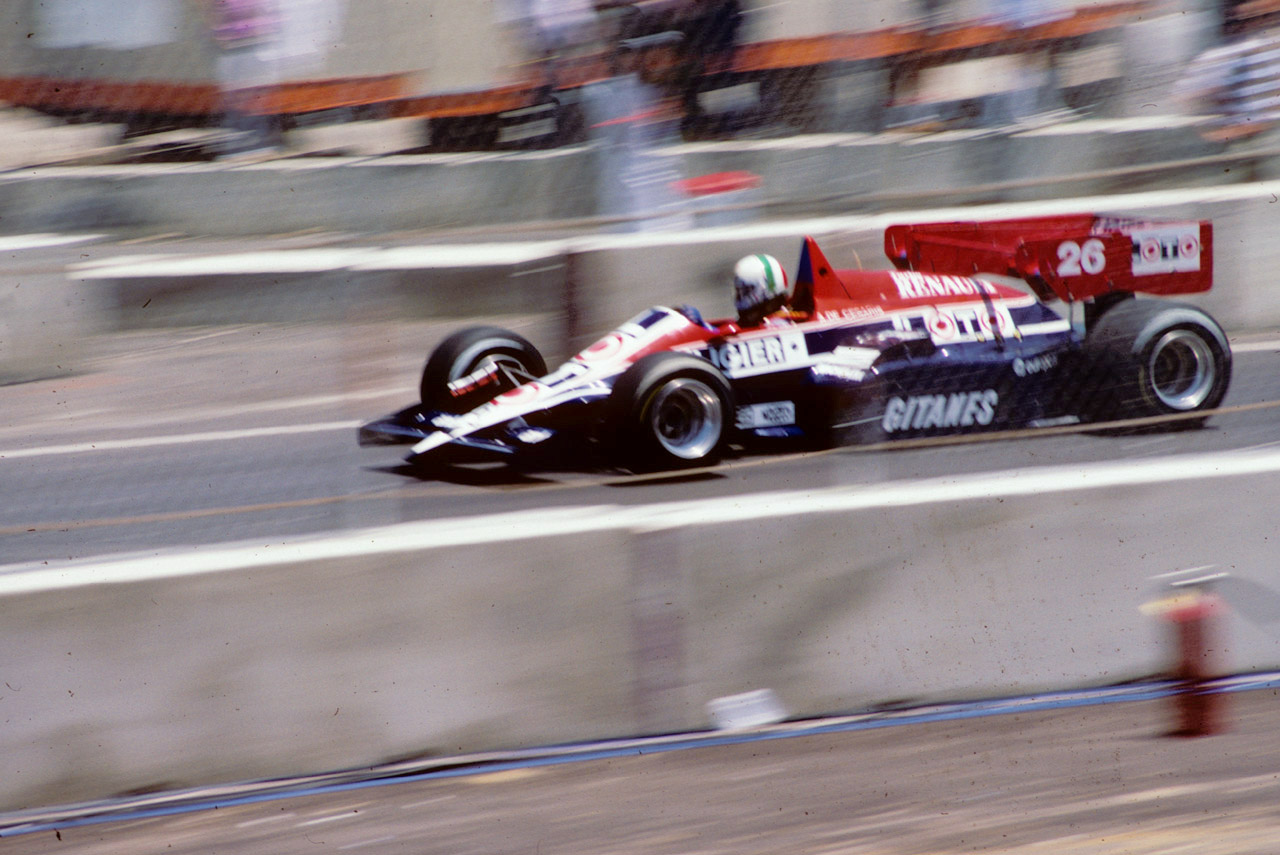
Ligier used a turbo engine for the first time in 1984. Andrea de Cesaris drives the JS23 chassis at that year's Dallas Grand Prix.

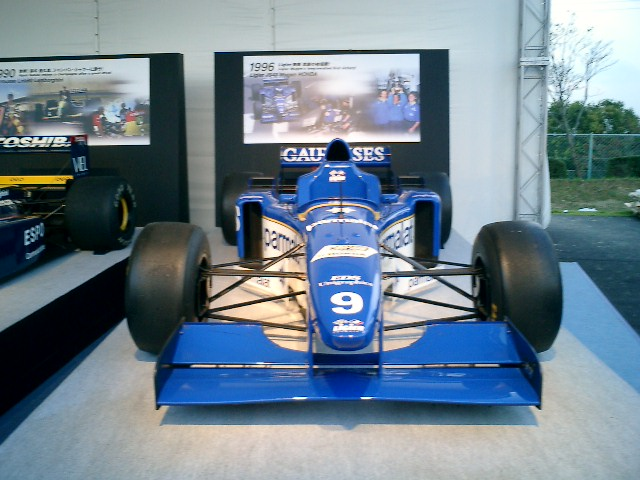
Ligier's last F1 car, the JS43, on display. Driven by Olivier Panis and Pedro Diniz, it provided Panis's only F1 victory and Ligier's last, at the 1996 Monaco Grand Prix.

The deal with Matra ceased in 1979 and Ligier built a Cosworth-powered wing-car, the Ligier JS11. The JS11 began the season winning the first two races in the hands of Laffite. However, the JS11 faced serious competition when Williams and Ferrari introduced aerodynamically modified cars. The rest of the season was less successful for the French marque.

The JS11 and its successors made Ligier one of the top teams through the early 1980s. Despite substantial sponsorship from Talbot (known officially as Talbot Ligier in the 1981 and 1982 seasons) and public French companies – mainly SEITA, Gitanes and Française des Jeux – the competitiveness of the team began to decline around 1982. Around this time, they were testing a Matra V6 turbocharged engine, which never raced. Thanks to the political support of Ligier long-time friend François Mitterrand, in the mid-1980s, the team benefitted from a free Renault turbo engine deal. This, along with sponsorship from companies such as Loto and Elf Aquitaine, made the team more competitive, though not a frontrunner. When Renault left the sport in 1986, Ligier was left without a bona fide engine supplier. An abortive collaboration with Alfa Romeo (due to René Arnoux's harsh criticism on the Alfa Romeo engines) was followed by customer engine deals with Megatron (who provided them with rebadged BMW M12 engines), Judd and Cosworth and then works contracts with Lamborghini, Renault and Mugen-Honda.

Between 1987 and 1991, the team struggled, failing to score points in 1988, 1990 and 1991, and at the 1988 San Marino Grand Prix neither René Arnoux nor Stefan Johansson qualified for the race, the first time in team history that neither car made the grid. In 1990, when fellow French team Larrousse were disqualified after claiming their chassis was built by themselves, while in fact it was built by Lola Cars, Ligier moved up into 10th place in the Constructors' Championship, which gave them subsidized travel benefits, despite actually not being classified due to a lack of points.

In 1993 the team enjoyed an upswing when Guy Ligier sold the team to Cyril de Rouvre after a disappointing 1992 season when they once again failed to fulfil their potential despite being supplied with the same works Renault engines as the dominant Williams team. Surprisingly, the team was somewhat more competitive during this period, in part due to the talents of aerodynamicist Frank Dernie and engineer Loïc Bigois. They scored eight podium finishes over the next four years, contrasting sharply with their failure to secure a single top three position between 1987 and 1992. In the last years Ligier had little public support and lacked funds.

In 1994, de Rouvre sold the team to Flavio Briatore and Tom Walkinshaw. Other organisations bidded to purchase Ligier, including Alain Prost and a consortium consisting of Hugues de Chaunac and Philippe Streiff, with the support of the similarly Renault-powered Williams F1 team, who intended to turn Ligier into a 'junior' team.

In 1995, the Renault engine supplier contract was transferred from Ligier to Benetton. Michael Schumacher tested a Renault-powered Ligier car late into the 1994 season, and Briatore persuaded Renault to switch the supplies to the defending champions.

Ligier's replacement engine supplier was Mugen-Honda, who in previous seasons with Footwork and Lotus did not initially have the best reliability. The switch to Mugen-Honda engines was not without controversy, as the contract was originally intended for the Minardi team. Though the engine was less reliable than the previous Renault engine, the 1995 season turned out to be surprisingly successful for the team while allowing them to score points on a more consistent basis combined with securing 2 podiums for the season, Martin Brundle securing 3rd place at Belgium and Olivier Panis securing 2nd at the last race of the season in Australia.

The Mugen-Honda-powered JS43 turned out to be a well-balanced car, if not on par with the Williams entries. It became a surprise winner as well, with the team taking the chequered flag with Olivier Panis at the Monaco Grand Prix, albeit in a race of heavy attrition, with only three cars finishing. It was the first "all-French" victory at Monaco since René Dreyfus in Bugatti in 1930 and it also marked the only win by a team outside the "Big Four" teams (McLaren, Williams, Benetton, and Ferrari) between the 1988 season and the 1997 season as well as the last Grand Prix win by a car built in France.

This victory ended a nearly fifteen-year-long winless-streak for the Ligier team (since the 1981 Canadian Grand Prix), the longest of any uninterruptedly existing team between two wins (some teams like Mercedes, Honda or Renault had much longer periods between two wins, but did not exist as a Grand Prix team for most of their respective periods between two wins).

The Ligier name last appeared in Formula One at the 1996 Japanese Grand Prix. Although Ligier was expected to be part of the 1997 season with the Ligier JS45, on 13 February 1997, the team was sold to Alain Prost and became Prost Grand Prix.

The team traditionally used numbers 25 and 26, even though 9 and 10 was used in 1996 and in 1997 it was expected to use 14 and 15.

As of 2025, Équipe Ligier remains the last defunct Formula One team to score a Grand Prix victory.

Ligier cars are still used in historic racing, winning races and titles in the Historic Grand Prix of Monaco and the FIA Historic F1 Championship.

== After Formula One ==
In 2004, Ligier returned to motorsport after acquiring Automobiles Martini. Tico Martini had designed a Formula 3 chassis that was introduced at the 2004 Paris Motor Show as the Ligier JS47, but with the F3 market cornered by Dallara, the car only raced in the minor Recaro F3 Cup.

In 2005 Ligier introduced a "gentlemen driver" sports car, the JS49, a sport prototype made for the 2000 cc CN class, which can be used in the V de V Challenge.

== Racecars ==
Year	Car	Image	Category
1969	Ligier JS1		Group 6
1971	Ligier JS2		Group 5
1971	Ligier JS3		Group 6
1976	Ligier JS5		Formula One
1977	Ligier JS7		Formula One
1978	Ligier JS7/9		Formula One
1978	Ligier JS9		Formula One
1979	Ligier JS11		Formula One
1980	Ligier JS11/15		Formula One
1981	Ligier JS17		Formula One
1982	Ligier JS17B		Formula One
1982	Ligier JS19		Formula One
1983	Ligier JS21		Formula One
1984	Ligier JS23		Formula One
1984	Ligier JS23B		Formula One
1985	Ligier JS25		Formula One
1986	Ligier JS27		Formula One
1987	Ligier JS29		Formula One
1987	Ligier JS29B		Formula One
1987	Ligier JS29C		Formula One
1988	Ligier JS31		Formula One
1989	Ligier JS33		Formula One
1990	Ligier JS33B		Formula One
1991	Ligier JS35		Formula One
1991	Ligier JS35B		Formula One
1992	Ligier JS37		Formula One
1993	Ligier JS39		Formula One
1994	Ligier JS39B		Formula One
1995	Ligier JS41		Formula One
1996	Ligier JS43		Formula One
2004	Ligier JS47		Formula Three
2004	Ligier JS49		Group CN
2008	Ligier JS51		Group CN
2012	Ligier JS53		Group CN
2014	Ligier JS55		Group CN
2014	Ligier JS P2		LMP2
2015	Ligier JS P3		LMP3
2017	Ligier JS P217		LMP2
2017	Ligier Nissan DPi		DPi
2018	Ligier JS2 R		GT Racing
2018	Ligier JS P4		LMP4
2019	Ligier JS F3		Formula Three
2020	Ligier JS P320		LMP3
2024	Lamborghini SC63		LMDh
2025	Ligier JS P325		LMP3

== Complete Formula One World Championship results ==
(key)

Year	Chassis	Engine(s)	Tyres	Drivers	1	2	3	4	5	6	7	8	9	10	11	12	13	14	15	16	17	Points	WCC
1976	JS5	Matra MS73 3.0 V12	G		BRA	RSA	USW	ESP	BEL	MON	SWE	FRA	GBR	GER	AUT	NED	ITA	CAN	USA	JPN		20	6th
1976	JS5	Matra MS73 3.0 V12	G	(France) Jacques Laffite	Ret	Ret	4	12	3	12	4	14	DSQ	Ret	2	Ret	3^{P}	Ret	Ret	7^{F}		20	6th
1977	JS7	Matra MS76 3.0 V12	G		ARG	BRA	RSA	USW	ESP	MON	BEL	SWE	FRA	GBR	GER	AUT	NED	ITA	USA	CAN	JPN	18	8th
1977	JS7	Matra MS76 3.0 V12	G	(France) Jacques Laffite	NC	Ret	Ret	9	7^{F}	7	Ret	1	8	6	Ret	Ret	2	8	7	Ret	5	18	8th
1977	JS7	Matra MS76 3.0 V12	G	(France) Jean-Pierre Jarier																	Ret	18	8th
1978	JS7; JS7/9; JS9	Matra MS76 3.0 V12; Matra MS78 3.0 V12	G		ARG	BRA	RSA	USW	MON	BEL	ESP	SWE	FRA	GBR	GER	AUT	NED	ITA	USA	CAN		19	6th
1978	JS7; JS7/9; JS9	Matra MS76 3.0 V12; Matra MS78 3.0 V12	G	(France) Jacques Laffite	16	9	5	5	Ret	5	3	7	7	10	3	5	8	4	11	Ret		19	6th
1979	JS11	Ford Cosworth DFV 3.0 V8	G		ARG	BRA	RSA	USW	ESP	BEL	MON	FRA	GBR	GER	AUT	NED	ITA	CAN	USA			61	3rd
1979	JS11	Ford Cosworth DFV 3.0 V8	G	(France) Patrick Depailler	4	2	Ret	5	1	Ret	5^{F}											61	3rd
1979	JS11	Ford Cosworth DFV 3.0 V8	G	(Belgium) Jacky Ickx								Ret	6	Ret	Ret	5	Ret	Ret	Ret			61	3rd
1979	JS11	Ford Cosworth DFV 3.0 V8	G	(France) Jacques Laffite	1^{P}^{F}	1^{P}^{F}	Ret	Ret	Ret^{P}	2^{P}	Ret	8	Ret	3	3	3	Ret	Ret	Ret			61	3rd
1980	JS11/15	Ford Cosworth DFV 3.0 V8	G		ARG	BRA	RSA	USW	BEL	MON	FRA	GBR	GER	AUT	NED	ITA	CAN	USA				66	2nd
1980	JS11/15	Ford Cosworth DFV 3.0 V8	G	(France) Didier Pironi	Ret	4	3	6	1	Ret^{P}	2	Ret^{P}^{F}	Ret	Ret	Ret	6	3^{F}	3				66	2nd
1980	JS11/15	Ford Cosworth DFV 3.0 V8	G	(France) Jacques Laffite	Ret	Ret	2	Ret	11^{F}	2	3^{P}	Ret	1	4	3	9	8	5				66	2nd
1981	JS17	Matra MS81 3.0 V12	M		USW	BRA	ARG	SMR	BEL	MON	ESP	FRA	GBR	GER	AUT	NED	ITA	CAN	CPL			44	4th
1981	JS17	Matra MS81 3.0 V12	M	(France) Jean-Pierre Jarier	Ret	7																44	4th
1981	JS17	Matra MS81 3.0 V12	M	(France) Jean-Pierre Jabouille			DNQ	NC	Ret	DNQ	Ret											44	4th
1981	JS17	Matra MS81 3.0 V12	M	(France) Patrick Tambay								Ret	Ret	Ret	Ret	Ret	Ret	Ret	Ret			44	4th
1981	JS17	Matra MS81 3.0 V12	M	(France) Jacques Laffite	Ret	6	Ret	Ret	2	3	2^{P}	Ret	3	3	1^{F}	Ret	Ret	1	6			44	4th
1982	JS17; JS17B; JS19	Matra MS81 3.0 V12	M		RSA	BRA	USW	SMR	BEL	MON	DET	CAN	NED	GBR	FRA	GER	AUT	SUI	ITA	CPL		20	8th
1982	JS17; JS17B; JS19	Matra MS81 3.0 V12	M	(United States) Eddie Cheever	Ret	Ret	Ret		3	Ret	2	10	DNQ	Ret	16	Ret	Ret	Ret	6	3		20	8th
1982	JS17; JS17B; JS19	Matra MS81 3.0 V12	M	(France) Jacques Laffite	Ret	Ret	Ret		9	Ret	6	Ret	Ret	Ret	14	Ret	3	Ret	Ret	Ret		20	8th
1983	JS21	Ford Cosworth DFV 3.0 V8; Ford Cosworth DFY 3.0 V8	M		BRA	USW	FRA	SMR	MON	BEL	DET	CAN	GBR	GER	AUT	NED	ITA	EUR	RSA			0	NC
1983	JS21	Ford Cosworth DFV 3.0 V8; Ford Cosworth DFY 3.0 V8	M	(France) Jean-Pierre Jarier	Ret	Ret	9	Ret	Ret	Ret	Ret	Ret	10	8	7	Ret	9	Ret	10			0	NC
1983	JS21	Ford Cosworth DFV 3.0 V8; Ford Cosworth DFY 3.0 V8	M	(Brazil) Raul Boesel	Ret	7	Ret	9	Ret	13	10	Ret	Ret	Ret	DNQ	10	DNQ	15	NC			0	NC
1984	JS23	Renault EF4 1.5 V6 t	M		BRA	RSA	BEL	SMR	FRA	MON	CAN	DET	DAL	GBR	GER	AUT	NED	ITA	EUR	POR		3	10th
1984	JS23	Renault EF4 1.5 V6 t	M	(France) François Hesnault	Ret	10	Ret	Ret	DNS	Ret	Ret	Ret	Ret	Ret	8	8	7	Ret	10	Ret		3	10th
1984	JS23	Renault EF4 1.5 V6 t	M	(Italy) Andrea de Cesaris	Ret	5	Ret	6	10	Ret	Ret	Ret	Ret	10	7	Ret	Ret	Ret	7	12		3	10th
1985	JS25	Renault EF4B 1.5 V6 t	P		BRA	POR	SMR	MON	CAN	DET	FRA	GBR	GER	AUT	NED	ITA	BEL	EUR	RSA	AUS		23	6th
1985	JS25	Renault EF4B 1.5 V6 t	P	(Italy) Andrea de Cesaris	Ret	Ret	Ret	4	14	10	Ret	Ret	Ret	Ret	Ret							23	6th
1985	JS25	Renault EF4B 1.5 V6 t	P	(France) Philippe Streiff												10	9	8		3		23	6th
1985	JS25	Renault EF4B 1.5 V6 t	P	(France) Jacques Laffite	6	Ret	Ret	6	8	12	Ret	3	3	Ret	Ret	Ret	11	Ret^{F}		2		23	6th
1986	JS27	Renault EF4B 1.5 V6 t	P		BRA	ESP	SMR	MON	BEL	CAN	DET	FRA	GBR	GER	HUN	AUT	ITA	POR	MEX	AUS		29	5th
1986	JS27	Renault EF4B 1.5 V6 t	P	(France) René Arnoux	4	Ret	Ret	5	Ret	6	Ret	5	4	4	Ret	10	Ret	7	15	7		29	5th
1986	JS27	Renault EF4B 1.5 V6 t	P	(France) Jacques Laffite	3	Ret	Ret	6	5	7	2	6	Ret									29	5th
1986	JS27	Renault EF4B 1.5 V6 t	P	(France) Philippe Alliot										Ret	9	Ret	Ret	Ret	6	8		29	5th
1987	JS29B; JS29C	Megatron M12/13 1.5 L4 t	G		BRA	SMR	BEL	MON	DET	FRA	GBR	GER	HUN	AUT	ITA	POR	ESP	MEX	JPN	AUS		1	11th
1987	JS29B; JS29C	Megatron M12/13 1.5 L4 t	G	(France) René Arnoux		DNS	6	11	10	Ret	Ret	Ret	Ret	10	10	Ret	Ret	Ret	Ret	Ret		1	11th
1987	JS29B; JS29C	Megatron M12/13 1.5 L4 t	G	(Italy) Piercarlo Ghinzani		Ret	7	12	Ret	Ret	EX	Ret	12	8	8	Ret	Ret	Ret	13	Ret		1	11th
1988	JS31	Judd CV 3.5 V8	G		BRA	SMR	MON	MEX	CAN	DET	FRA	GBR	GER	HUN	BEL	ITA	POR	ESP	JPN	AUS		0	NC
1988	JS31	Judd CV 3.5 V8	G	(France) René Arnoux	Ret	DNQ	Ret	Ret	Ret	Ret	DNQ	18	17	Ret	Ret	13	10	Ret	17	Ret		0	NC
1988	JS31	Judd CV 3.5 V8	G	(Sweden) Stefan Johansson	9	DNQ	Ret	10	Ret	Ret	DNQ	DNQ	DNQ	Ret	11	DNQ	Ret	Ret	DNQ	9		0	NC
1989	JS33	Ford Cosworth DFR 3.5 V8	G		BRA	SMR	MON	MEX	USA	CAN	FRA	GBR	GER	HUN	BEL	ITA	POR	ESP	JPN	AUS		3	13th
1989	JS33	Ford Cosworth DFR 3.5 V8	G	(France) René Arnoux	DNQ	DNQ	12	14	DNQ	5	Ret	DNQ	11	DNQ	Ret	9	13	DNQ	DNQ	Ret		3	13th
1989	JS33	Ford Cosworth DFR 3.5 V8	G	(France) Olivier Grouillard	9	DSQ	Ret	8	DNQ	DNQ	6	7	Ret	DNQ	13	Ret	DNQ	Ret	Ret	Ret		3	13th
1990	JS33B	Ford Cosworth DFR 3.5 V8	G		USA	BRA	SMR	MON	CAN	MEX	FRA	GBR	GER	HUN	BEL	ITA	POR	ESP	JPN	AUS		0	NC
1990	JS33B	Ford Cosworth DFR 3.5 V8	G	(Italy) Nicola Larini	Ret	11	10	Ret	Ret	16	14	10	10	11	14	11	10	7	7	10		0	NC
1990	JS33B	Ford Cosworth DFR 3.5 V8	G	(France) Philippe Alliot	EX	12	9	Ret	Ret	18	9	13	DSQ	14	DNQ	13	Ret	Ret	10	11		0	NC
1991	JS35; JS35B	Lamborghini 3512 3.5 V12	G		USA	BRA	SMR	MON	CAN	MEX	FRA	GBR	GER	HUN	BEL	ITA	POR	ESP	JPN	AUS		0	NC
1991	JS35; JS35B	Lamborghini 3512 3.5 V12	G	(Belgium) Thierry Boutsen	Ret	Ret	7	7	Ret	8	12	Ret	9	17	11	Ret	16	Ret	9	Ret		0	NC
1991	JS35; JS35B	Lamborghini 3512 3.5 V12	G	(France) Érik Comas	DNQ	Ret	10	10	8	DNQ	11	DNQ	Ret	10	Ret	11	11	Ret	Ret	18		0	NC
1992	JS37	Renault RS3B 3.5 V10; Renault RS3C 3.5 V10	G		RSA	MEX	BRA	ESP	SMR	MON	CAN	FRA	GBR	GER	HUN	BEL	ITA	POR	JPN	AUS		6	8th
1992	JS37	Renault RS3B 3.5 V10; Renault RS3C 3.5 V10	G	(Belgium) Thierry Boutsen	Ret	10	Ret	Ret	Ret	12	10	Ret	10	7	Ret	Ret	Ret	8	Ret	5		6	8th
1992	JS37	Renault RS3B 3.5 V10; Renault RS3C 3.5 V10	G	(France) Érik Comas	7	9	Ret	Ret	9	10	6	5	8	6	Ret	DNQ	Ret	Ret	Ret	Ret		6	8th
1993	JS39	Renault RS5 3.5 V10	G		RSA	BRA	EUR	SMR	ESP	MON	CAN	FRA	GBR	GER	HUN	BEL	ITA	POR	JPN	AUS		23	5th
1993	JS39	Renault RS5 3.5 V10	G	(United Kingdom) Martin Brundle	Ret	Ret	Ret	3	Ret	6	5	5	14	8	5	7	Ret	6	9	6		23	5th
1993	JS39	Renault RS5 3.5 V10	G	(United Kingdom) Mark Blundell	3	5	Ret	Ret	7	Ret	Ret	Ret	7	3	7	11	Ret	Ret	7	9		23	5th
1994	JS39B	Renault RS6 3.5 V10	G		BRA	PAC	SMR	MON	ESP	CAN	FRA	GBR	GER	HUN	BEL	ITA	POR	EUR	JPN	AUS		13	6th
1994	JS39B	Renault RS6 3.5 V10	G	(France) Éric Bernard	Ret	10	12	Ret	8	13	Ret	13	3	10	10	7	10					13	6th
1994	JS39B	Renault RS6 3.5 V10	G	(United Kingdom) Johnny Herbert														8				13	6th
1994	JS39B	Renault RS6 3.5 V10	G	(France) Franck Lagorce															Ret	11		13	6th
1994	JS39B	Renault RS6 3.5 V10	G	(France) Olivier Panis	11	9	11	9	7	12	Ret	12	2	6	7	10	DSQ	9	11	5		13	6th
1995	JS41	Mugen-Honda MF-301 3.0 V10	G		BRA	ARG	SMR	ESP	MON	CAN	FRA	GBR	GER	HUN	BEL	ITA	POR	EUR	PAC	JPN	AUS	24	5th
1995	JS41	Mugen-Honda MF-301 3.0 V10	G	(Japan) Aguri Suzuki	8	Ret	11						6						Ret	DNS		24	5th
1995	JS41	Mugen-Honda MF-301 3.0 V10	G	(United Kingdom) Martin Brundle				9	Ret	10	4	Ret		Ret	3	Ret	8	7			Ret	24	5th
1995	JS41	Mugen-Honda MF-301 3.0 V10	G	(France) Olivier Panis	Ret	7	9	6	Ret	4	8	4	Ret	6	9	Ret	Ret	Ret	8	5	2	24	5th
1996	JS43	Mugen-Honda MF-301 HA 3.0 V10	G		AUS	BRA	ARG	EUR	SMR	MON	ESP	CAN	FRA	GBR	GER	HUN	BEL	ITA	POR	JPN		15	6th
1996	JS43	Mugen-Honda MF-301 HA 3.0 V10	G	(France) Olivier Panis	7	6	8	Ret	Ret	1	Ret	Ret	7	Ret	7	5	Ret	Ret	10	7		15	6th
1996	JS43	Mugen-Honda MF-301 HA 3.0 V10	G	(Brazil) Pedro Diniz	10	8	Ret	10	7	Ret	6	Ret	Ret	Ret	Ret	Ret	Ret	6	Ret	Ret		15	6th
