= Ligier JS33 =

Ligier JS33 Ligier JS33B
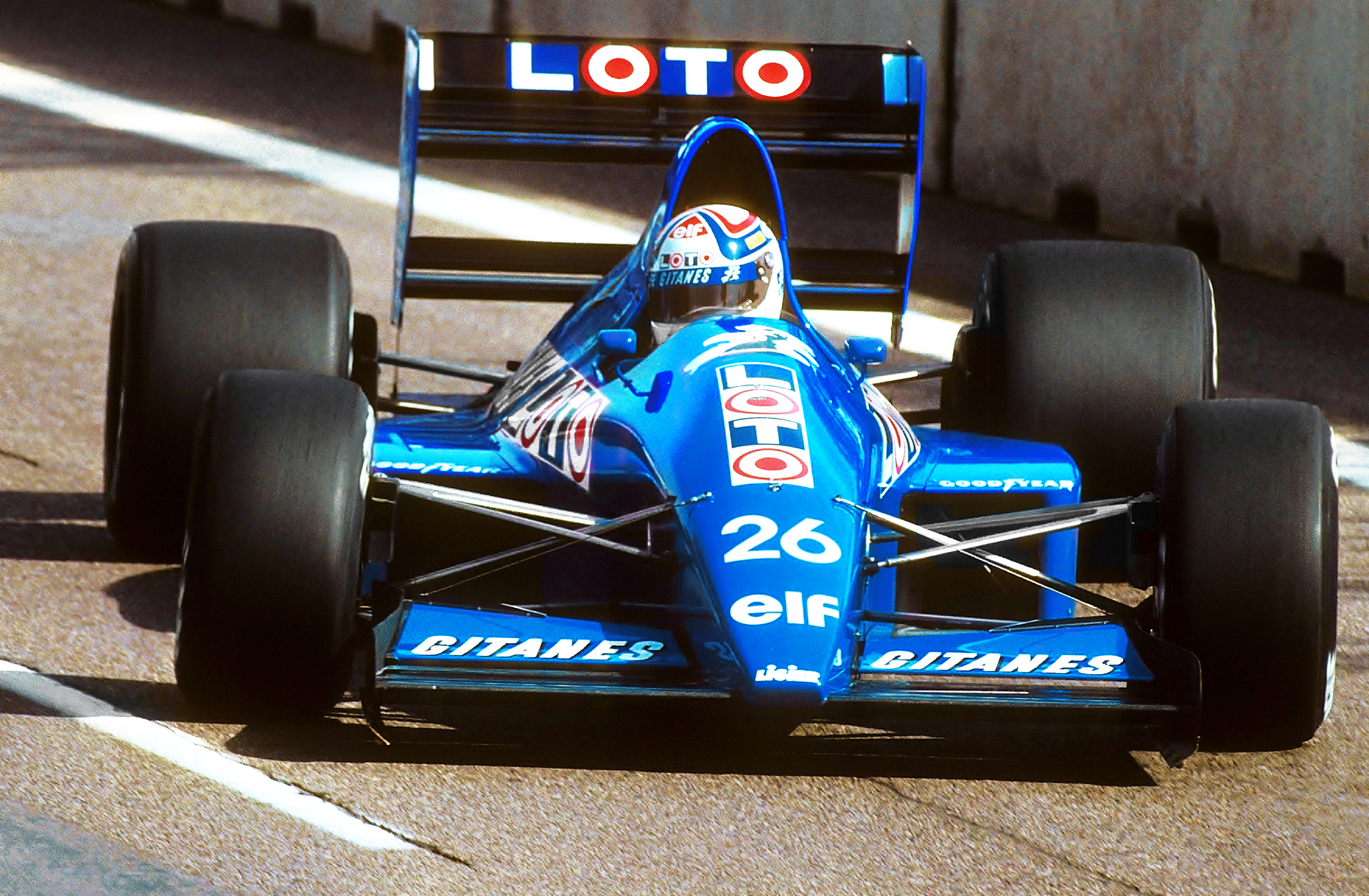
- Philippe Alliot in the JS33B in the 1990 United States Grand Prix
- Category: Formula One
- Constructor: Ligier
- Designers: Michel Beaujon (Technical Director); Claude Galopin (Chief Designer); Richard Divila (Head of Design)
- Predecessor: JS31
- Successor: JS35

Technical specifications
- Chassis: Carbon Fibre Monocoque
- Axle track: Front: 1,698 mm (66.9 in); Rear: 1,810 mm (71 in)
- Wheelbase: 2,850 mm (112 in)
- Engine: Cosworth DFR 3,493 cc (213.2 cu in), V8, NA, mid-engine, longitudinally mounted
- Transmission: Transverse, 6 speed
- Weight: 505kg
- Fuel: Antar, Elf
- Tyres: Goodyear

Competition history
- Notable entrants: Equipe Ligier Gitanes
- Notable drivers: 25. (France) René Arnoux (1989); 25. (Italy) Nicola Larini (1990); 26. (France) Olivier Grouillard (1989); 26. (France) Philippe Alliot (1990)
- Debut: 1989 Brazilian Grand Prix
- Last event: 1990 Australian Grand Prix
Races	Wins	Poles	F/Laps
30	0	0	0

The Ligier JS33 was a Formula One car used by the Ligier team during the 1989 Formula One season. Its best finish in a race was fifth, at the 1989 Canadian Grand Prix. The JS33 was updated to a 'B' spec for use in the following season, but failed to score any points for the team.

== Development ==
For the 1989 season, Ligier switched from the Judd engines of the previous season to Cosworth DFR. The JS33 chassis was designed by Michel Beaujon and finished off by Richard Divila. In appearance, it looked similar to the March 881 and even used the same gearbox (purchased from March).

The chassis was updated to a 'B' spec for the 1990 Formula One season. The March gearbox from the previous season was discarded in favour of an X-trac unit, and the front suspension was revised. Weight was also shaved from the car.

== Race history ==
=== 1989 season ===
Ligier's lead driver from the previous season, René Arnoux, remained with the team and alongside him was new recruit Olivier Grouillard. Arnoux, in his final season in Formula One, did not start the year well, failing to qualify for the first two races of the year before making the grid in the Monaco Grand Prix in 21st spot. He went on to finish the race in 12th. He continued to struggle during qualifying, only making the grid on eight more occasions. He finished in the points once, with a fifth-place finish at the Canadian Grand Prix.

Grouillard was usually the faster of the two Ligier drivers. His best qualification performance was at the San Marino Grand Prix where he was 10th on the grid. He was disqualified from the race after his team worked on his car prior to a restart of the race. His best finish of the year was 6th, at the French Grand Prix. Grouillard left the team at the end of the season. Ligier finished 13th equal in the World Constructors' Championship with three points, an improvement on the previous year.

=== 1990 season ===
Nicola Larini and Philippe Alliot were Ligier's drivers for the 1990 Formula One season. Larini was a reliable driver for the team, finishing all but three of his races. He did not score any points and his best finishes were back to back seventh places at the Spanish and Japanese Grand Prix. Alliot had some unfortunate races; he was excluded from the opening race in the United States when a mechanic worked on his car outside of the pits and he was disqualified from the German Grand Prix when he received a push start on the first lap of the race.

With more cars than spaces available on the grid, some teams had to enter pre-qualifying in order to be allowed to participate in qualifying proper. With neither driver scoring points by the midpoint of the season, Ligier was relegated to having to pre-qualify from the German Grand Prix. However, this only lasted for a few races before one of the seeded teams, Onyx, withdrew from Formula One, allowing Ligier, as the best placed unseeded team, direct entry into qualifying.

== Complete Formula One results ==
(key) (results in bold indicate pole position; results in italics indicate fastest lap)

Year	Team	Chassis	Engine	Tyres	Drivers	1	2	3	4	5	6	7	8	9	10	11	12	13	14	15	16	Points	WCC
1989	Ligier Loto	JS33	Ford V8	G		BRA	SMR	MON	MEX	USA	CAN	FRA	GBR	GER	HUN	BEL	ITA	POR	ESP	JPN	AUS	3	13th
1989	Ligier Loto	JS33	Ford V8	G	René Arnoux	DNQ	DNQ	12	14	DNQ	5	Ret	DNQ	11	DNQ	Ret	9	13	DNQ	DNQ	Ret	3	13th
1989	Ligier Loto	JS33	Ford V8	G	Olivier Grouillard	9	DSQ	Ret	8	DNQ	DNQ	6	7	Ret	DNQ	13	Ret	DNQ	Ret	Ret	Ret	3	13th
1990	Equipe Ligier Gitanes	JS33B	Ford V8	G		USA	BRA	SMR	MON	CAN	MEX	FRA	GBR	GER	HUN	BEL	ITA	POR	ESP	JPN	AUS	0	NC
1990	Equipe Ligier Gitanes	JS33B	Ford V8	G	Nicola Larini	Ret	11	10	Ret	Ret	16	14	10	10	11	14	11	10	7	7	10	0	NC
1990	Equipe Ligier Gitanes	JS33B	Ford V8	G	Philippe Alliot	EX	12	9	Ret	Ret	18	9	13	DSQ	14	DNQ	13	Ret	Ret	10	11	0	NC
