= Ligier JS35 =

Ligier JS35 Ligier JS35B
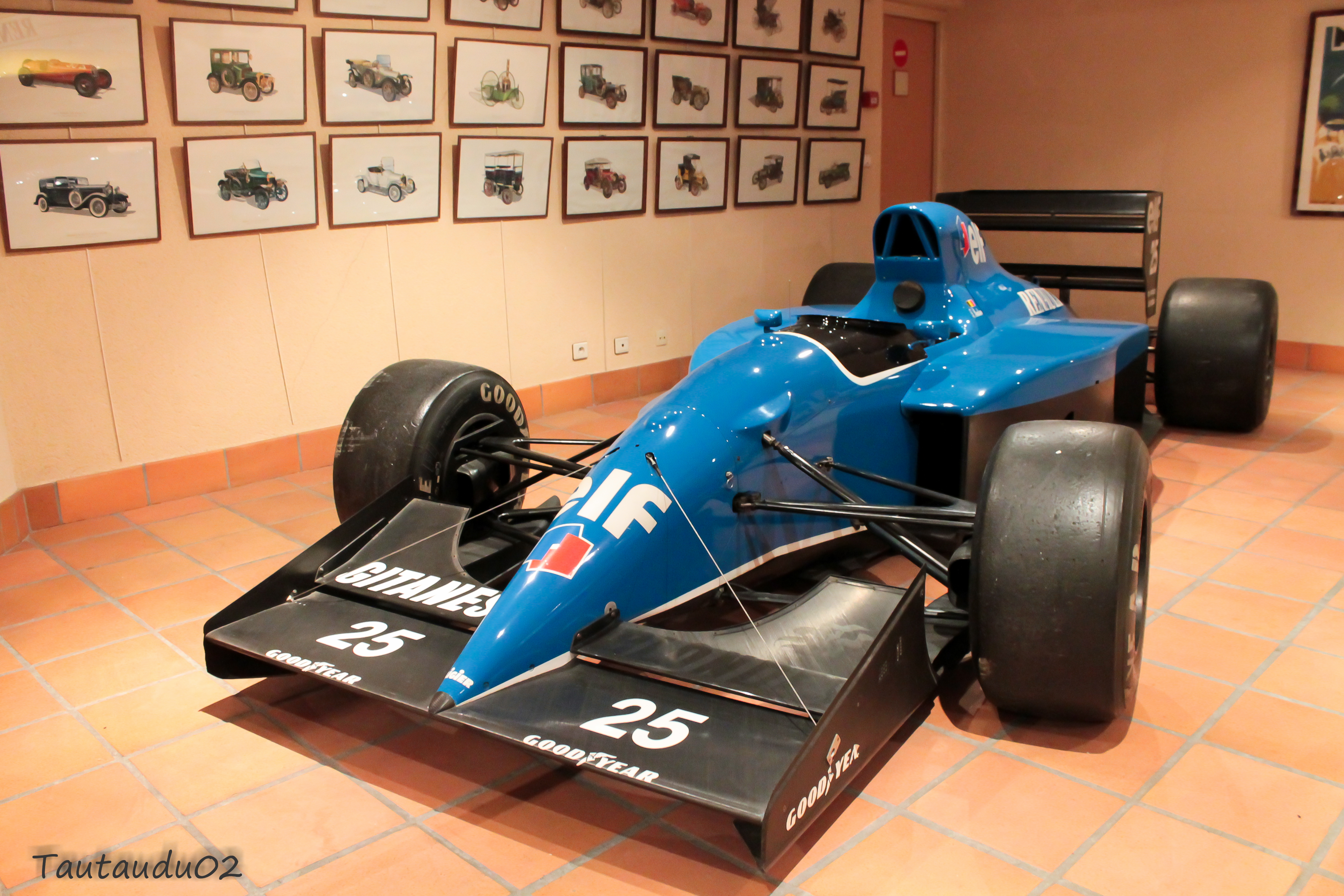
- The JS35 on display at the Musée Automobile de Monaco
- Category: Formula One
- Constructor: Ligier
- Designers: Michel Beaujon (Technical Director); Frank Dernie (Chief Designer); Loïc Bigois (Head of Aerodynamics)
- Predecessor: JS33B
- Successor: JS37

Technical specifications
- Chassis: Carbon Fibre Monocoque
- Axle track: Front: 1,830 mm (72 in); Rear: 1,650 mm (65 in)
- Wheelbase: 2,900 mm (110 in)
- Engine: Lamborghini LE3512, 3,493 cc (213.2 cu in), V12, NA, mid-engine, longitudinally mounted
- Transmission: Transverse, semi-automatic, 6 speed
- Weight: 520kg
- Fuel: Elf
- Tyres: Goodyear

Competition history
- Notable entrants: Equipe Ligier Gitanes
- Notable drivers: 25. (Belgium) Thierry Boutsen; 26. (France) Érik Comas
- Debut: 1991 United States Grand Prix
- Last event: 1991 Australian Grand Prix
Races	Wins	Poles	F/Laps
16	0	0	0

The Ligier JS35 was a Formula One car used by the Ligier team during the 1991 Formula One season. It was updated to a 'B' spec during the season. The car was powered by the Lamborghini V12 engine and ran on Goodyear tyres. Its best finish in a race was seventh (twice).

== Design and development ==
For the 1991 Formula One World Championship, team owner Guy Ligier had secured the use of V12 engines from Lamborghini, which had been used the previous season by Team Lotus and Larrousse. This was to be a stopgap measure as for 1992, the team were to use Renault V10s.

The JS35 chassis was prepared by Ligier's design department under the direction of Michel Beaujon, Claude Galopin and Richard Divila, the latter two being fired after the disappointing start to the season. The car was overweight and bulky from the start, not helped by the large oil tank required for the new engines. Changes to the suspension for the start of the European leg of the season helped performance a little.

The chassis was later updated to a 'B' spec by new Ligier recruit Frank Dernie. The JS35B, which made its debut at the French Grand Prix, also had some input from Gérard Ducarouge who was recruited mid-season. The monocoque chassis of the JS35B was of carbon fibre and provided with a six-speed transverse gearbox developed by Xtrac. It was configured with double wishbone pushrod suspension, front and rear, and used Koni and Bilstein dampers. Brakes were by Brembo with Carbone Industrie pads. The steering was designed in-house by Ligier and the car ran on Goodyear tyres. The wheelbase of the chassis was 2,900 millimetres (114.2 in), the front track was 1,830 millimetres (72.0 in) while the rear track was 1,650 millimetres (65.0 in). The capacity of the fuel tank was 215 litres (47.3 imp gal) and fuel and oil was supplied by Elf. The overall weight of the car was 520 kilograms (1,146.4 lb).

== Race history ==
The JS35 was driven by new Ligier drivers Thierry Boutsen, formerly of Williams, and Érik Comas, the 1990 F3000 champion. In the season opening United States Grand Prix, Comas failed to qualify while Boutsen placed 20th on the starting grid. He failed to finish the race, retiring with engine problems while holding 12th place. Comas made his debut at the next race in Brazil; he qualified 23rd but retired with an oil cooler fire on lap 51. He was running in 11th at the time. Boutsen finished 10th with a misfiring engine, having started from 18th on the grid.

At the San Marino Grand Prix Comas placed his JS35 19th on the grid, out-qualifying Boutsen who was in 24th. Boutsen secured the better finish, 7th, in the race; Comas was 10th, having to swap to the team's spare car after his own broke down on the parade lap. For Monaco, the team's drivers started 16th (Boutsen) and 23rd (Comas), the former finishing 7th. Comas had to make a stop for tyres and ran at the back of the field, finishing 10th. Comas qualified last for the Canadian race, his teammate placing 16th on the grid. In the race itself, Boutsen ran as high as 9th before his engine blew on lap 27. Comas achieved what proved to be his best finish of the year, 8th.

Comas failed to make the Mexican Grand Prix, the fastest non-qualifier. Boutsen though qualified in 14th and went on to finish 8th. For the team's home race in France, the upgraded JS35B made its debut. Qualifying was improved with Comas making the grid in 14th while Boutsen was two places further back. Although experiencing technical difficulties, both drivers finished, Comas in 11th, having run as high as 9th by lap 11, and Boutsen behind him in 12th. The team fared less well at the next race in Britain as Comas failed to qualify. Boutsen started from 19th on the grid but his Lamborghini engine failed on lap 27 while he was holding 12th place.

At the German Grand Prix, Boutsen qualified 17th and, despite being troubled with faulty brakes and clutch, finished in 9th place. Comas had started from last place after crashing heavily during a practice session. Reverting to the spare car, he was holding 18th place when he retired on lap 22 due to low oil pressure. In the Hungarian race, Boutsen, who had won the event from pole position the previous year, qualified 19th while Comas placed 25th on the grid. The latter ran non-stop through the race to finish 10th. Boutsen had been running 10th but on lap 72 broke down. He was still classified 17th, having set the 6th fastest race lap.

Boutsen qualified in 18th place for his home race in Belgium but Comas only just made the field, in 26th. Boutsen experienced a tyre puncture while running 11th in the race. Stopping for a replacement, he ended up finishing in 11th. Comas also had a puncture early in the race; running last after stopping for a replacement, he retired on 26 with an engine failure. In Italy, the team's drivers qualified in 21st and 22nd respectively, Boutsen ahead of Comas. On lap 2, Boutsen crashed with Martin Brundle in the Brabham BT60, ending his race. Comas went on to finish 10th, despite losing the use of his clutch early on.

For the Portuguese race, Boutsen qualified 20th and Comas 23rd. On race day, Comas finished 11th but Boutsen found his car had poor grip and finished 16th. Boutsen and Comas both qualified poorly for the Spanish Grand Prix, lining up 25th and 26th on the grid. A collision with Eric Bernard's Lola LC91 on lap 1 ended Boutsen's race while Comas, taking advantage of damp conditions, had run as high as 6th place at one point before retiring on lap 37. In Japan, Boutsen finished 9th after qualifying in 17th. Comas started from 20th but had advanced to 7th by lap 24. The alternator on his JS35B broke on lap 42, ending his race. In the season-ending race in Australia, which was afflicted with heavy rain and only ran for 14 laps, Boutsen qualified in 20th and retired on lap 5 after a collision with Nakajima. Comas, after starting 22nd, was running in 18th when the race was called off.

As neither of its driver scored any points during the season, Ligier ended the year unplaced in the Constructors' Championship.

== Complete Formula One results ==
(key) (results in bold indicate pole position; results in italics indicate fastest lap)

Year	Chassis	Engine(s)	Tyres	Drivers	1	2	3	4	5	6	7	8	9	10	11	12	13	14	15	16	Points	WCC
1991	JS35; JS35B	Lamborghini V12	**G**		USA	BRA	SMR	MON	CAN	MEX	FRA	GBR	GER	HUN	BEL	ITA	POR	ESP	JPN	AUS	**0**	**NC**
1991	JS35; JS35B	Lamborghini V12	**G**	Thierry Boutsen	Ret	10	7	7	Ret	8	12	Ret	9	Ret	11	Ret	16	Ret	9	Ret	**0**	**NC**
1991	JS35; JS35B	Lamborghini V12	**G**	Érik Comas	DNQ	Ret	10	10	8	DNQ	11	DNQ	Ret	10	Ret	11	11	Ret	Ret	18	**0**	**NC**
