= Olivier Grouillard =

French racing driver (born 1958)

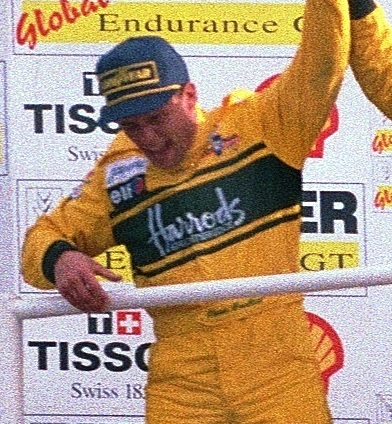
- Grouillard at the 1995 BPR 4 Hours of Silverstone
- Born: 2 September 1958 (age 68); Fenouillet, Haute-Garonne, France

Formula One World Championship career
- Nationality: (France) French
- Active years: 1989–1992
- Team(s): Ligier, Osella, Fondmetal, AGS, Tyrrell
- Entries: 62 (41 starts)
- Championships: 0
- Wins: 0
- Podiums: 0
- Career points: 1
- Pole positions: 0
- Fastest laps: 0
- First entry: 1989 Brazilian Grand Prix
- Last entry: 1992 Australian Grand Prix

24 Hours of Le Mans career
- Years: 1990, 1994–1998, 2000
- Teams: Nissan, Venturi, Giroix, Price, Courage, Pescarolo
- Best finish: 4th (2000)
- Class wins: 0

Olivier Grouillard (French pronunciation: [ɔlivje grujaʁ]; born 2 September 1958) is a French racing driver, who competed in Formula One from 1989 to 1992, and IndyCar in 1993.

Born in Fenouillet, Haute-Garonne, Grouillard started kart racing from the age of fourteen competing in events such as the Volant Elf. He progressed to Formula Renault winning the title before competing in F3000 from 1985 to 1988 taking two wins. He also participated in the Birmingham Superprix but did not start the race.

In 1989, Grouillard joined the Ligier Formula One team before joining the Osella team for 1990 and 1991 when the team was renamed Fondmetal. His last season came in 1992, when Grouillard drove for Tyrrell. He left the sport following the year without receiving offers for a drive in 1993.

After leaving Formula One, Grouillard raced in the CART PPG World Series, competing in the Indianapolis 500 for which he did not qualify but showed consistency. Grouillard became well known for driving in Sports Cars between 1994 and 2001 having success. During his time in Sports Cars, he raced in the BPR Global GT Series, the FIA GT Championship, the Daytona 24 Hours, the Le Mans 24 Hours and the American Le Mans Series. He retired from motorsport at the end of 2001.

== Career ==
=== Before Formula One ===
Grouillard was born, in Fenouillet. He started racing karts from the age of 14 and competed in the Volant Elf in 1981 and progressed to Formula Renault in 1982 and took the title. In 1983, Grouillard went into French F3 and drove for the ORECA team racing a Martini Mk39 Alfa Romeo to finish 4th scoring 33 points. Driving a Martini Mk42 in 1984 brought him the title and scored 108 points. For 1985, Grouillard competed in the inaugural season of F3000 spending the year mostly confined to qualifying in the midfield but delivered good races along with reliability. In 1986, he left ORECA to join Formula Team Ltd driving a Lola T86/50 Cosworth. At Mugello, Grouillard finished fourth despite taking an early lead. At the Osterrichring, he took sixth and overall scored four points despite limited participation as the team was short on funding. Grouillard returned to ORECA for 1987 in a March 87B Cosworth. His performances dropped despite having impressive qualifying record throughout the season. For 1988, Grouillard moved to the GBDA Motorsport driving a Lola T88/50 Cosworth. He once again showed potential during qualifying and was regularly scoring points along with wins. Grouillard was slightly injured in a crash during the 1988 Birmingham Superprix sustaining bruised ankles although observers initially thought that Grouillard had broken both his legs. Grouillard was able to start the race but had to run to the pit lane for the spare car after his car suffered a failure with the engine. Grouillard however, did not start the race.

Grouillard also raced a series of works and semi-works BMW M3's for BMW in the 1987 World Touring Car Championship and the 1988 European Touring Car Championships

=== Formula One ===
==== 1989 ====
Grouillard joined Ligier to fill in the seat left by Stefan Johansson and was the team-mate to René Arnoux for 1989. He qualified 22nd in his first race in Brazil and finished ninth. At Imola, he overcame spinning his car to start in tenth, but was disqualified when mechanics worked on his car during a red flag stint, caused by the accident of Gerhard Berger at Tamburello. He started outside the top-ten at Monaco and Mexico, finishing eighth in the latter but was unable to qualify in Phoenix and Montréal. He started from 17th at his home race at the French Grand Prix and drove to sixth, despite having issues with the tyres and gearbox, scoring his only World Championship point. For the last six races, Grouillard failed to qualify higher than 20th and did not qualify in Portugal. In qualifying for the Belgian Grand Prix at Spa, Grouillard impeded the Lotus of Nelson Piquet by staying on the racing line whilst the Brazilian was on his last flying lap. On the dirty line, Piquet spun off and shook his fist at Grouillard as he passed by. This cost the triple World Champion his chances in qualifying and the race, and it was to be the first of such incidents involving Grouillard's misuse of his mirrors. At Adelaide, he spun which followed a heavy crash in the rain. In fact, for the season ending Australian Grand Prix in Adelaide, he kept the Ligier mechanics busy by spinning off and hitting the concrete walls twice during practice and qualifying as well as in the race morning warm up session (which was wet) and the race.

During his last 2–3 seasons in Formula One, Arnoux had gained the reputation of being a blocker, a driver who rarely used his mirrors and regularly held up others both in qualifying and races. Unfortunately, this trait seemed to have been passed on to Grouillard, who was fast gaining his own reputation of being a blocker.

==== 1990 ====
Grouillard joined the Italian Osella team, taking the seat of Nicola Larini, who in return took Grouillard's seat at Ligier. He was not partnered for 1990 as the financially struggling Osella scaled back their operations, meaning Grouillard had to pre-qualify for the races. He managed to qualify in eighth in Phoenix ahead of Nigel Mansell and Alessandro Nannini which amazed many people in Formula One. During the race, Grouillard was hit by Riccardo Patrese's Williams at the second corner and eventually retired after a second collision with the Swiss driver Gregor Foitek. At Brazil, he retired after another collision involving Michele Alboreto. For Imola, the car was upgraded, but that did not help the team as Grouillard retired (not before blocking Mansell in qualifying and ruining the Ferrari's qualifying run, earning the Frenchman a fist wave from Mansell, and not for the last time). He also failed to qualify at Monaco. Two consecutive finishes outside the top-ten at Canada and Mexico were followed up with a poor run in pre-qualifying for France, ending up not qualifying for the race and at Silverstone and Hockenheim, where he also failed to qualify along with another failure to pre-qualify at Hungary. Grouillard finished 16th at Spa with retirements at Monza and Jerez with wheel bearing problems that plagued the Frenchman throughout the year.

At the season ending Australian Grand Prix in Adelaide, Grouillard finished 13th and again held up Nigel Mansell during the race which led to the British driver shaking his fist at the Frenchman in front of the on-board camera.

==== 1991 ====
Grouillard remained with Osella, which had been bought out and renamed to Fondmetal. The team had to race with the car used for the two previous years, which led to Grouillard not being able to get past pre-qualifying at Phoenix and Interlagos. A new car was built, but this did not change Grouillard's season, as he had further three failures to pre-qualify. A change of fortune did come at Mexico, where he qualified his season-best tenth, but was forced to start from the pit lane after suffering from mechanical problems in the car, and he eventually succumbed to an engine failure after 14 laps. He retired in his home race at France with an oil leak, and had further failures to pre-qualify at Silverstone and Hockenheim. In Hungary, Grouillard managed to get into the main qualifying event, but eventually failed to qualify. At Spa-Francorchamps, he finished a lap down in tenth and retired from an engine failure at Monza with just seven laps to go. Grouillard failed to qualify in Portugal, and had to take a spare gearbox, with the old one failing to work. He refused to let the car use a new gearbox, and was sacked a few days later by team boss Gabriele Rumi. He managed to join AGS in the seat vacated by his replacement at Fondmetal, Gabriele Tarquini, for the next race at Catalunya. For the race, Grouillard was the slowest in pre-qualifying behind new team-mate Fabrizio Barbazza, with the AGS team folding before the pair could get to Japan and Australia.

==== 1992 ====
Grouillard was taken on by Ken Tyrrell to drive the Ilmor-powered Tyrrell 020B chassis and was partnered by Italian Andrea de Cesaris. He was learning from de Cesaris' experience, and often qualified in the midfield. His car had the share of mechanical problems, but managed to finish in San Marino, Canada, France and Britain. A collision with a wall in Spain, along with a collision with Karl Wendlinger's March in Hungary, a spin on the opening lap at Spa, a collision with Pierluigi Martini's Dallara in Adelaide had brought himself unrepentant about his manners whilst racing. He was eventually not wanted by other teams, and left Formula One at the end of the season. Grouillard and other French racing drivers lobbied for leading motorsport events, such as the French motorcycle Grand Prix to be saved, after they were put at risk by the new anti-tobacco laws in France brought in by health minister Claude Évin.

=== CART ===
Grouillard arranged to drive with the Indy Regency Team in a Lola T92/00 for 1993 in the CART PPG World Series following Nigel Mansell in the series. His first race was the Indianapolis 500, where he did not qualify. After the 500, Grouillard showed consistency and had a reliable car finishing in eight out of 11 events with only one mechanical retirement at Michigan and a collision with Arie Luyendyk at Vancouver. Overall, Grouillard finished 28th overall taking four points.

=== Sports Car racing ===
==== 1994–2001 ====
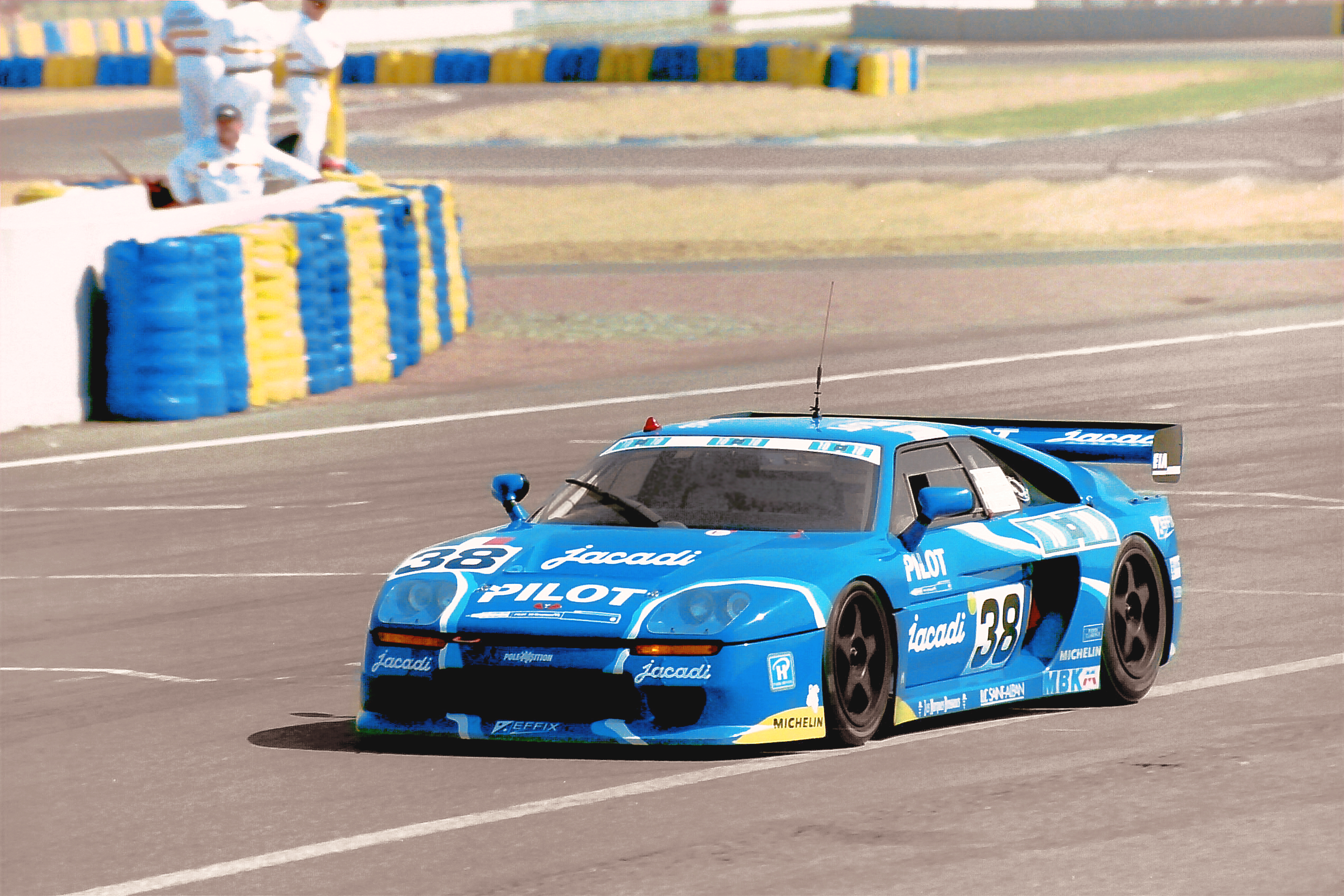
The Venturi 600 LM #38 of Olivier Grouillard at the 1994 24 Hours of Le Mans

Unable to make a success in CART, Grouillard returned to Europe in 1994 and raced sports cars in the BPR Global GT series. He had previous experience in 1990 where he and co-drivers Martin Donnelly and Kenny Acheson qualified fifth at Le Mans but gearbox problems prevented the trio from starting. He came 16th in a Venturi 400 Trophy with Herve Pulain coming in fourth in GT5 class before driving five races in an Agusta Racing Team Venturi 600LM with Christophe Bouchut taking second at Montlehry and fifth at Vallelunga and also raced at Le Mans in a Jacadi Racing Venturi 600Lm with Michel Ferté and Michel Neugarten with engine problems ending their race.

The Jacadi connection remained in 1995 with Grouillard joined by Fabien Giroix in a Giroix Racing Team Jacadi McLaren F1 GTR for 3 rounds in the BPR series with a fifth at Jarama and second at the Nurburgring. The pair were joined by Jean-Denis Délétraz at Le Mans, where they finished fifth. Grouillard departed for Mach One Racing joining Andy Wallace winning all three rounds the new pairing entered. Grouillard scored 91 points and finished 14th overall. In the first qualifying race at Nogaro, Grouillard's car suffered a faulty shock absorber.

Grouillard remained with Mach One, and Harrods came on board as sponsor. Retirements plagued the team for the first four rounds were remedied by victory at Silverstone and a sixth at Le Mans where they were joined by Derek Bell. Further finishes came at Anderstorp, Suzuka and Brands Hatch where he came fourth, third and second respectively. Grouillard failed to qualify at Spa in a Friesinger Motorsport Porsche 911 GT2 Evo shared with Wolfgang Kaufmann and at Nogaro driving a BBA Competition Mclaren F1 GTP with Jean-Luc Maury-Lariberre, he failed to finish. Grouillard finished 8th with 106 points. Throughout the season, he also competed in other events such as the Daytona 24 Hours with Derek Hill and Gildo Pastor Pallanca with a transmission problem forcing the trio out.

Grouillard entered the FIA GT Championship in 1997 in a Dave Price Racing Panoz GTP Ford, teamed up with David Brabham and Perry McCarthy and also competed in Japanese GT finishing second at Suzuka in a Toyota Supra with Masami Kageyama. For that year's Le Mans race, Grouillard drove in a Courage Compétition C36 Porsche with Mario Andretti and his son Michael, but retired after fifteen and a half hours.

Grouillard returned to the race in 1998, driving a La Filiere Courage C36 Porsche with Henri Pescarolo and Franck Montagny managing to finish 16th. Grouillard's other entry was the International Sports Racing Series at Misano, but did not compete as his entrant failed to attend the race.

For 2000, Grouillard raced in the American Le Mans Series driving a Courage C52 Peugeot with Sébastien Bourdais coming sixth at Silverstone and entered the Nurburgring round but did not take part in practice. At Le Mans, he finished fourth.

In 2001, Grouillard looked to join Pescarolo Sport at Le Mans but was replaced by Boris Derichebourg ending Grouillard's motorsport career.

== Racing record ==
=== Career summary ===
Season	Series	Team	Races	Wins	Poles	F/Laps	Podiums	Points	Position
1982	Championnat de France Formule Renault Turbo	Ecurie Elf	13	1	2	6	5	87	4th
1983	French Formula Three	Oreca	9	0	2	1	3	73	4th
1983	European Formula Three	Oreca	3	0	0	0	0	0	NC
1984	French Formula Three	Oreca	9	4	5	4	8	108	**1st**
1984	European Formula Three	Oreca	1	0	0	0	0	0	NC
1985	International Formula 3000	Oreca	8	0	0	0	0	7	12th
1986	International Formula 3000	Hotz-Formula Team Ltd.	4	0	0	0	0	4	16th
1987	World Touring Car Championship	Bigazzi	9	0	0	0	3	164	7th
1987	International Formula 3000	Oreca	9	0	0	0	0	4	17th
1988	International Formula 3000	GBDA Motorsport	10	2	3	2	5	34	**2nd**
1988	European Touring Car Championship	Bigazzi	7	0	0	0	3	136	14th
1989	Formula One	Ligier Loto	12	0	0	0	0	1	26th
1990	Formula One	Osella Squadra Corse	9	0	0	0	0	0	NC
1990	IMSA GT Championship	Ferrari France	1	0	0	0	1	12	29th
1990	24 Hours of Le Mans	Nissan Motorsports International	1	0	0	0	0	N/A	DNF
1991	Formula One	Fondmetal F1 SpA	4	0	0	0	0	0	NC
1991	Formula One	Automobiles Gonfaronnaises Sportives	4	0	0	0	0	0	NC
1992	Formula One	Tyrrell Racing Organisation	16	0	0	0	0	0	NC
1992	Deutsche Tourenwagen Meisterschaft	Bigazzi	2	0	0	0	0	0	NC
1993	PPG Indy Car World Series	Indy Regency Racing	11	0	0	0	0	4	28th
1994	24 Hours of Le Mans	Jacadi Racing	1	0	0	0	0	N/A	DNF
1995	BPR Global GT Series	GRT Jacadi	6	3	0	0	4	91	14th
1995	BPR Global GT Series	Mach One Racing	6	3	0	0	4	91	14th
1995	24 Hours of Le Mans	Giroix Racing Team	1	0	0	0	0	N/A	5th
1996	BPR Global GT Series	Harrods Mach One Racing	10	1	1	0	3	106	16th
1996	BPR Global GT Series	Freisinger Motorsport	10	1	1	0	3	106	16th
1996	BPR Global GT Series	BBA Compétition	10	1	1	0	3	106	16th
1996	24 Hours of Le Mans	Harrods Mach One Racing	1	0	0	0	0	N/A	6th
1997	FIA GT Championship	David Price Racing	4	0	0	0	0	0	NC
1997	All Japan Grand Touring Car Championship	Toyota Team SARD	1	0	0	0	1	15	14th
1997	24 Hours of Le Mans	Courage Compétition	1	0	0	0	0	N/A	DNF
1998	24 Hours of Le Mans	Courage Compétition	1	0	0	0	0	N/A	15th
2000	American Le Mans Series	Pescarolo Sport	1	0	0	0	0	13	53rd
2000	24 Hours of Le Mans	Pescarolo Sport	1	0	0	0	0	N/A	4th

=== Complete International Formula 3000 results ===
(key) (Races in bold indicate pole position; races in italics indicate fastest lap.)

Year	Entrant	1	2	3	4	5	6	7	8	9	10	11	12	Pos.	Pts
1985	Oreca Motorsport	SIL	THR; 8	EST; 6	NÜR	VAL; 4	PAU; 4	SPA; Ret	DIJ; 7	PER; 8	ÖST; 8	ZAN	DON	12th	7
1986	Hotz-Formula Team Ltd.	SIL	VAL	PAU	SPA	IMO	MUG; 4	PER	ÖST; 6	BIR; Ret	BUG	JAR; 9		16th	4
1987	Oreca Motorsport	SIL; 7	VAL; Ret	SPA; DNQ	PAU; 4	DON; 12	PER; Ret	BRH; 15	BIR; 6	IMO; Ret	BUG; Ret	JAR; Ret		17th	4
1988	GBDA Motorsport	JER; 5	VAL; 3	PAU; Ret	SIL; Ret	MNZ; Ret	**PER**; 2	BRH; Ret	**BIR**; DNS	**BUG**; 1	ZOL; 1	DIJ; 3		**2nd**	**34**

=== Complete Formula One results ===
(key)

Year	Entrant	Chassis	Engine	1	2	3	4	5	6	7	8	9	10	11	12	13	14	15	16	WDC	Points
1989	Ligier Loto	Ligier JS33	Cosworth V8	BRA; 9	SMR; DSQ	MON; Ret	MEX; 8	USA; DNQ	CAN; DNQ	FRA; 6	GBR; 7	GER; Ret	HUN; DNQ	BEL; 13	ITA; Ret	POR; DNQ	ESP; Ret	JPN; Ret	AUS; Ret	26th	1
1990	Osella Squadra Corse	Osella FA1M	Cosworth V8	USA; Ret	BRA; Ret															NC	0
1990	Osella Squadra Corse	Osella FA1ME	Cosworth V8			SMR; Ret	MON; DNQ	CAN; 13	MEX; 19	FRA; DNPQ	GBR; DNQ	GER; DNQ	HUN; DNPQ	BEL; 16	ITA; Ret	POR; DNQ	ESP; Ret	JPN; DNQ	AUS; 13	NC	0
1991	Fondmetal F1 SpA	Fondmetal FA1M-E90	Cosworth V8	USA; DNPQ	BRA; DNPQ															NC	0
1991	Fondmetal F1 SpA	Fomet F1	Cosworth V8			SMR; DNPQ	MON; DNPQ	CAN; DNPQ	MEX; Ret	FRA; Ret	GBR; DNPQ	GER; DNPQ	HUN; DNQ	BEL; 10	ITA; Ret	POR; DNPQ				NC	0
1991	Automobiles Gonfaronnaises Sportives	AGS JH27	Cosworth V8														ESP; DNPQ	JPN	AUS	NC	0
1992	Tyrrell Racing Organisation	Tyrrell 020B	Ilmor V10	RSA; Ret	MEX; Ret	BRA; Ret	ESP; Ret	SMR; 8	MON; Ret	CAN; 12	FRA; 11	GBR; 11	GER; Ret	HUN; Ret	BEL; Ret	ITA; Ret	POR; Ret	JPN; Ret	AUS; Ret	NC	0

=== 24 Hours of Le Mans results ===
Year	Team	Co-Drivers	Car	Class	Laps	Pos.	Class Pos.
1990	(Japan) Nissan Motorsports International	(United Kingdom) Kenny Acheson (United Kingdom) Martin Donnelly	Nissan R90CK	C1	0	DNF	DNF
1994	(France) Jacadi Racing	(France) Michel Ferté (Belgium) Michel Neugarten	Venturi 600LM	GT1	107	DNF	DNF
1995	(France) Giroix Racing Team	(France) Fabien Giroix (Switzerland) Jean-Denis Délétraz	McLaren F1 GTR	GT1	290	5th	4th
1996	(United Kingdom) Harrods Mach One Racing (United Kingdom) David Price Racing	(United Kingdom) Andy Wallace (United Kingdom) Derek Bell	McLaren F1 GTR	GT1	328	6th	5th
1997	(France) Courage Compétition	(United States) Mario Andretti (United States) Michael Andretti	Courage C36-Porsche	LMP	197	DNF	DNF
1998	(France) Courage Compétition	(France) Henri Pescarolo (France) Franck Montagny	Courage C36-Porsche	LMP1	304	15th	4th
2000	(France) Pescarolo Sport	(France) Sébastien Bourdais (France) Emmanuel Clérico	Courage C52-Peugeot	LMP900	344	4th	4th

=== CART results ===
(key)

Year	Team	No.	1	2	3	4	5	6	7	8	9	10	11	12	13	14	15	16	Rank	Points	Ref
1993	Indy Regency	29	SRF	PHX	LBH	INDY; DNQ	MIL; 12	DET; 24	POR; 13	CLE; 11	TOR; DNS	MCH; 17	NHA; 12	ROA; 16	VAN; 26	MDO; 16	NAZ; 18	LAG; 20	**28th**	**4**	

=== Complete JGTC results ===
(key) (Races in bold indicate pole position) (Races in italics indicate fastest lap)

Year	Team	Car	Class	1	2	3	4	5	6	DC	Pts
1997	Toyota Team SARD	Toyota Supra	GT500	SUZ; 2	FUJ	SEN	FUJ	MIN	SUG	14th	15

Sporting positions
Preceded by Michel Ferté	French Formula Three; Champion; 1984	Succeeded by Pierre-Henri Raphanel
