= Ligier JS39 =

Formula One Car

Ligier JS39 Ligier JS39B
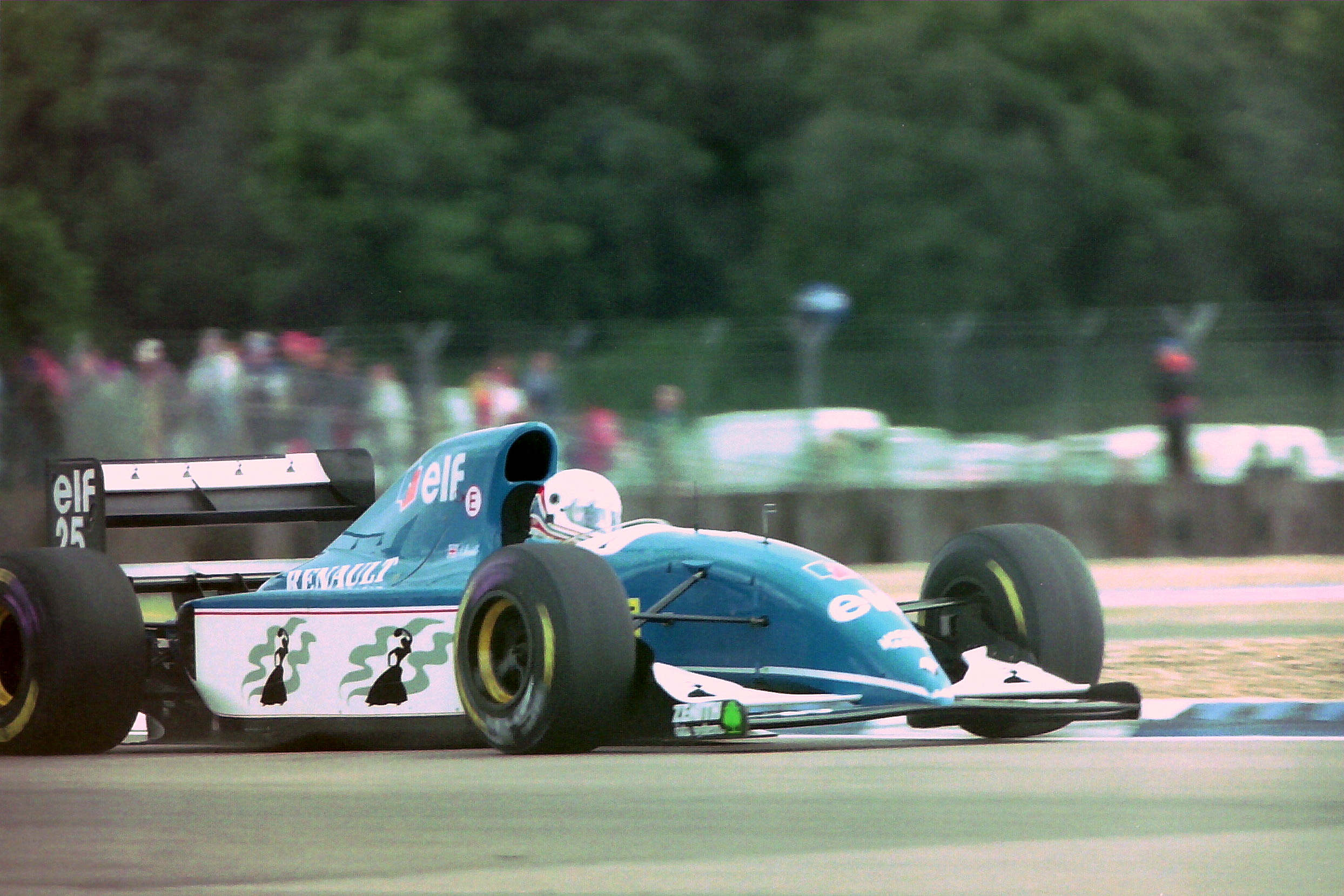
- Martin Brundle driving the JS39 at the 1993 British Grand Prix
- Category: Formula One
- Constructor: Ligier
- Designers: Gérard Ducarouge (Technical Director); Paul Crooks (Chief Designer); John Davis (Head of R&D); Gérard Gerriet (Head of Transmission); Steve Clark (Special Projects Manager); Loïc Bigois (Chief Aerodynamicist)
- Predecessor: JS37
- Successor: JS41

Technical specifications
- Chassis: carbon fibre monocoque
- Axle track: Front: 1,690 mm (67 in); Rear: 1,600 mm (63 in)
- Wheelbase: 2,995 mm (117.9 in)
- Engine: Renault RS5 / Renault RS6, 3,493 cc (213.2 cu in), V10, NA, mid-engine, longitudinally mounted
- Transmission: Williams Semi-automatic 6-speed
- Weight: 505 kg (1,113 lb)
- Fuel: Elf
- Tyres: Goodyear

Competition history
- Notable entrants: Ligier Gitanes Blondes
- Notable drivers: 25. (United Kingdom) Martin Brundle; 25. (France) Éric Bernard; 25. (United Kingdom) Johnny Herbert; 25. (France) Franck Lagorce; 26. (United Kingdom) Mark Blundell; 26. (France) Olivier Panis
- Debut: 1993 South African Grand Prix
- Last event: 1994 Australian Grand Prix
| Races | Wins | Podiums | Poles | F/Laps |
|---|---|---|---|---|
| 32 | 0 | 5 | 0 | 0 |

The Ligier JS39 was a Formula One car used by the Ligier team during the 1993 and 1994 Formula One seasons.

First raced in the 1993 South African Grand Prix where, driven by Briton Mark Blundell, it finished third, the JS39's best finish was a second place achieved by Frenchman Olivier Panis at the 1994 German Grand Prix.

== Ligier JS39 ==
The engine was the Renault RS5 3.5 V10.

The number 25 chassis was driven by experienced Briton Martin Brundle and the number 26 driven by Mark Blundell. The team did not employ a test driver. The team used a semi-automatic gearbox for the first time, but retained passive suspension. The car was relatively successful for the team, achieving 3 podium finishes, and 23 constructor points. For much of the season, the team stood in fourth place in the constructors' championship, only being overtaken by Ferrari with two races remaining. However, their fifth place in the championship was still their best championship finish since 1986, when they also finished in fifth.

== Ligier JS39B ==
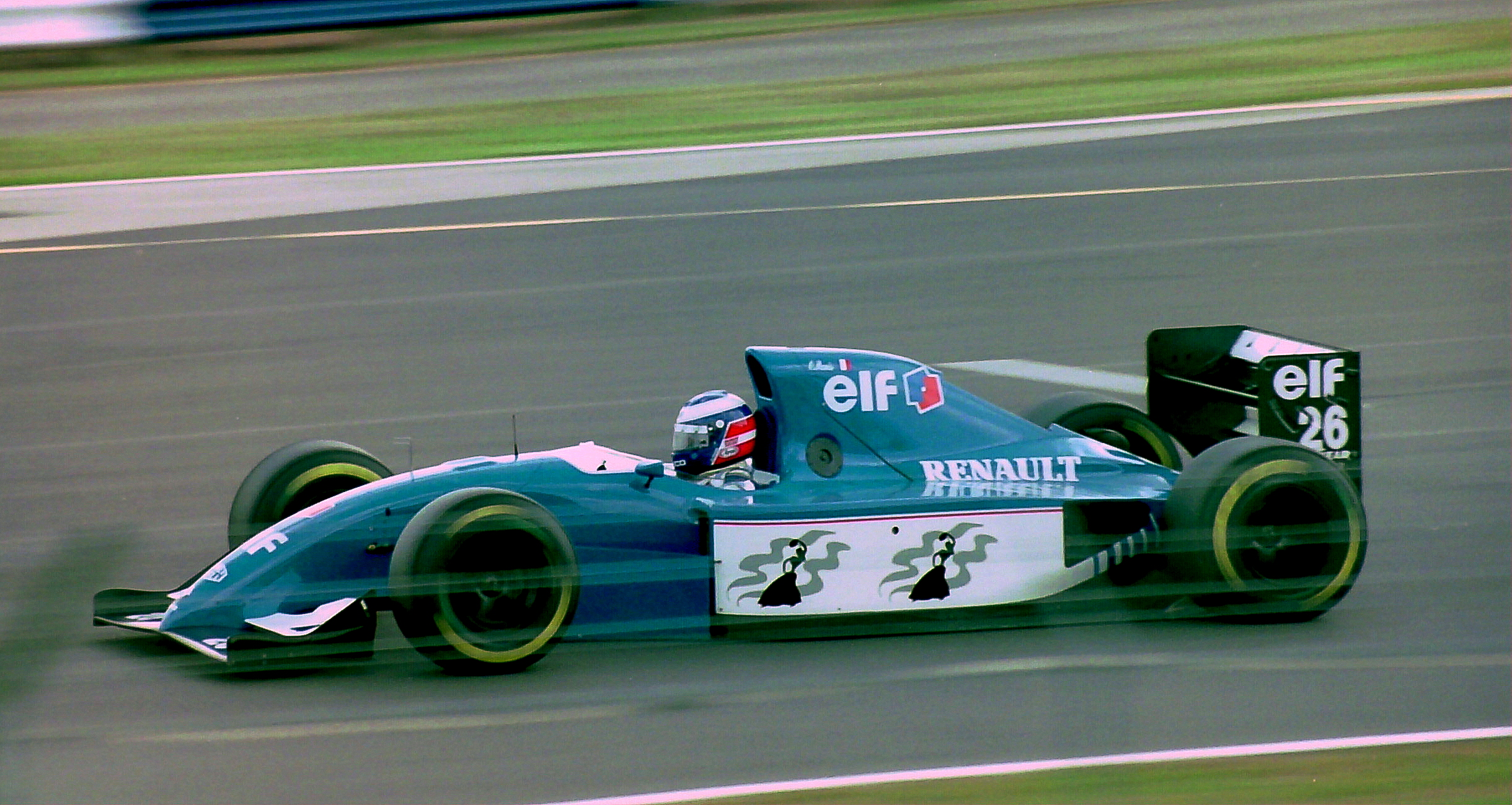
Olivier Panis driving the JS39B at the 1994 British Grand Prix.

For 1994, the car was upgraded to 'B' specification. The number 26 seat was occupied by Olivier Panis for the whole year, however, the number 25 seat was taken by Éric Bernard, Johnny Herbert and Franck Lagorce. The team's test driver was Lagorce. The engine was a Renault RS6 3.5 V10. The car did not perform as well as in 1993 but was reliable, enabling Panis and Bernard to finish 2nd and 3rd respectively in the German Grand Prix. The team scored only two other points finishes for the rest of the season.

The JS39B was also tested by Michael Schumacher at Estoril in December 1994, at the request of Flavio Briatore, who became the owner of the Ligier team, after the team was purchased by Tom Walkinshaw and Briatore in 1994.

== Sponsorship and livery ==
Livery changes for the JS39 and JS39B are minor, the large horizontal white stripes from the previous season were replaced with a white horizontal dash graphics on the side of the car. In the Grands Prix that did not allow tobacco branding, the Gitanes logos were replaced with a 'gypsy women'. In France, it was completely removed.

One of the notable sponsors was Les Pages Jaunes. The following season, it was missing.

At the 1993 Japanese and Australian Grands Prix, Brundle's car was painted with a special artwork livery done by Hugo Pratt.

== Complete Formula One results ==
(key) (results in bold indicate pole position; results in italics indicate fastest lap)

| Year | Chassis | Engine(s) | Tyres | Drivers | 1 | 2 | 3 | 4 | 5 | 6 | 7 | 8 | 9 | 10 | 11 | 12 | 13 | 14 | 15 | 16 | Points | WCC |
|---|---|---|---|---|---|---|---|---|---|---|---|---|---|---|---|---|---|---|---|---|---|---|
| 1993 | JS39 | Renault V10 | G | | RSA | BRA | EUR | SMR | ESP | MON | CAN | FRA | GBR | GER | HUN | BEL | ITA | POR | JPN | AUS | 23 | 5th |
| 1993 | JS39 | Renault V10 | G | Martin Brundle | Ret | Ret | Ret | 3 | Ret | 6 | 5 | 5 | 14 | 8 | 5 | 7 | Ret | 6 | 9 | 6 | 23 | 5th |
| 1993 | JS39 | Renault V10 | G | Mark Blundell | 3 | 5 | Ret | Ret | 7 | Ret | Ret | Ret | 7 | 3 | 7 | 11 | Ret | Ret | 7 | 9 | 23 | 5th |
| 1994 | JS39B | Renault V10 | G | | BRA | PAC | SMR | MON | ESP | CAN | FRA | GBR | GER | HUN | BEL | ITA | POR | EUR | JPN | AUS | 13 | 6th |
| 1994 | JS39B | Renault V10 | G | Éric Bernard | Ret | 10 | 12 | Ret | 8 | 13 | Ret | 13 | 3 | 10 | 10 | 7 | 10 | | | | 13 | 6th |
| 1994 | JS39B | Renault V10 | G | Johnny Herbert | | | | | | | | | | | | | | 8 | | | 13 | 6th |
| 1994 | JS39B | Renault V10 | G | Franck Lagorce | | | | | | | | | | | | | | | Ret | 11 | 13 | 6th |
| 1994 | JS39B | Renault V10 | G | Olivier Panis | 11 | 9 | 11 | 9 | 7 | 12 | Ret | 12 | 2 | 6 | 7 | 10 | DSQ | 9 | 11 | 5 | 13 | 6th |
