= 1990 German Grand Prix =

- Race 9 of 16 in the 1990 Formula One World Championship

Race details
- Date: 29 July 1990
- Official name: Grosser Mobil 1 Preis von Deutschland
- Location: Hockenheimring near Heidelberg, West Germany
- Course: Permanent racing facility
- Course length: 6.802 km (4.227 miles)
- Distance: 45 laps, 306.090 km (190.195 miles)
- Weather: Hot, dry, sunny

Pole position
Driver	(Brazil) Ayrton Senna	McLaren-Honda
- Time: 1:40.198

Fastest lap
Driver	(Belgium) Thierry Boutsen	Williams-Renault
- Time: 1:45.602 on lap 31

Podium
First	(Brazil) Ayrton Senna	McLaren-Honda
Second	(Italy) Alessandro Nannini	Benetton-Ford
Third	(Austria) Gerhard Berger	McLaren-Honda

The 1990 German Grand Prix was a Formula One motor race held at the Hockenheimring on 29 July 1990. It was the ninth race of the 1990 Formula One World Championship. The race was the 52nd German Grand Prix and the 14th to be held at the Hockenheimring. It was the 39th and last Formula One Grand Prix to be held in West Germany prior to its re-unification with East Germany. The race was held over 45 laps of the seven kilometre circuit for a race distance of 306 kilometres.

The race was won by 1988 World Champion, Brazilian driver Ayrton Senna driving a McLaren MP4/5B. He took a six-second victory over Italian driver Alessandro Nannini driving a Benetton B190 who was just two seconds in front of Senna's Austrian teammate Gerhard Berger.

Senna's win put him back into the championship points lead, four ahead of Ferrari driver Alain Prost.

== Qualifying ==
=== Pre-qualifying report ===
The Hockenheim circuit had been given all-new pits facilities with a wider pit lane, and a wider start-finish straight.

The participants in the Friday morning pre-qualifying sessions were slightly reshuffled prior to this event, the season having reached its mid-point. Larrousse had scored enough points during the previous two half-seasons to be relieved of the requirement to pre-qualify, and could automatically join the rest of the field in the main qualifying sessions from here on. A failure to score any points so far this season meant that Ligier were forced to join the pre-qualifying pool. Osella, AGS, EuroBrun, Coloni and Life were all still required to pre-qualify.

Here at Hockenheim, Ligier were comfortably first and second in the one-hour session, with Philippe Alliot outpacing team-mate Nicola Larini in their Ford-powered JS33Bs. Third fastest was Olivier Grouillard in the Osella, and Yannick Dalmas was fourth in his AGS. It was Grouillard's eighth pre-qualification from nine events, and Dalmas' third.

Those missing out on pre-qualification included fifth-placed Gabriele Tarquini in the other AGS, a second slower than his team-mate, and Roberto Moreno, sixth in the EuroBrun. Coloni, having parted ways with Subaru and their uncompetitive flat 12 engine, appeared with the modified but untested C3C, powered by a customer Cosworth DFR V8 engine. Bertrand Gachot spun the car during the session and damaged it, failing to pre-qualify for the ninth consecutive time this season. Also ending his involvement at this early stage for the ninth Grand Prix in a row was Claudio Langes in the other EuroBrun, ahead only of Bruno Giacomelli, who was again a far distant last in the Life.

=== Pre-qualifying classification ===
Pos	No	Driver	Constructor	Time	Gap
1	26	(France) Philippe Alliot	Ligier-Ford	1:45.513	—
2	25	(Italy) Nicola Larini	Ligier-Ford	1:46.186	+0.673
3	14	(France) Olivier Grouillard	Osella-Ford	1:46.828	+1.315
4	18	(France) Yannick Dalmas	AGS-Ford	1:47.125	+1.612
5	17	(Italy) Gabriele Tarquini	AGS-Ford	1:48.127	+2.614
6	33	(Brazil) Roberto Moreno	EuroBrun-Judd	1:48.983	+3.470
7	31	(Belgium) Bertrand Gachot	Coloni-Ford	1:50.460	+4.947
8	34	(Italy) Claudio Langes	EuroBrun-Judd	1:50.897	+5.384
9	39	(Italy) Bruno Giacomelli	Life	2:10.786	+25.273

=== Qualifying report ===
After three straight wins by Ferraris Alain Prost, McLaren-Honda showed that they were back on top in qualifying. Honda promised McLaren a more powerful V10 engine at Hockenheim and McLaren had done some modifications to the MP4/5B chassis. Both parties delivered with pole man Senna and second placed Berger (only 0.2 seconds slower) the only drivers to lap in the 1:40's and they did this during the first qualifying session- an indication of the McLaren-Honda car's superior pace at one of the fastest Grand Prix circuits of the year, with both cars lapping at over 150 mph (240 km/h). The Ferraris of Prost and Nigel Mansell were over 1.5 seconds slower (with the Englishman complaining of a down on power engine compared to his team mate), and the Williams-Renaults of Riccardo Patrese and Thierry Boutsen occupying the 3rd row. So confident were McLaren that their times would not be beaten that both Senna and Berger did over 20 laps each and spent the entire second qualifying session working on their race set up without actually setting anything like a qualifying time, their fastest times over 6 seconds slower than the previous day. McLaren also introduced a new aerodynamic cowling cover for the MP4/5B at Hockenheim designed to lessen the buffeting effect on the drivers heads by diverting air to the sides of the car. This would remain on the car for the rest of the season.

Rounding out the top 10 were Nelson Piquet (Benetton-Ford), Jean Alesi (Tyrrell-Ford), Alessandro Nannini (Benetton-Ford) who had a fiery crash during Friday qualifying at the Bremsschikane 2 after riding a kerb and hitting the barrier hard enough to throw the car into the air and back onto the track causing the session to be stopped. Nannini survived the crash with little more than bruised pride. The 10th fastest qualifier was Ivan Capelli in the Leyton House-Judd. Such was the spread in times that Capelli was some 4.151 seconds slower than Senna.

=== Qualifying classification ===
Pos	No	Driver	Constructor	Q1	Q2	Gap
1	27	(Brazil) Ayrton Senna	McLaren-Honda	1:40.198	1:46.843	—
2	28	(Austria) Gerhard Berger	McLaren-Honda	1:40.434	1:46.628	+0.236
3	1	(France) Alain Prost	Ferrari	1:41.732	1:42.590	+1.532
4	2	(United Kingdom) Nigel Mansell	Ferrari	1:42.313	1:42.057	+1.859
5	6	(Italy) Riccardo Patrese	Williams-Renault	1:43.736	1:42.195	+1.997
6	5	(Belgium) Thierry Boutsen	Williams-Renault	1:43.620	1:42.380	+2.182
7	20	(Brazil) Nelson Piquet	Benetton-Ford	1:42.926	1:42.872	+2.674
8	4	(France) Jean Alesi	Tyrrell-Ford	1:43.255	1:44.652	+3.057
9	19	(Italy) Alessandro Nannini	Benetton-Ford	1:43.594	1:44.559	+3.396
10	16	(Italy) Ivan Capelli	Leyton House-Judd	1:45.025	1:44.349	+4.151
11	30	(Japan) Aguri Suzuki	Lola-Lamborghini	1:45.382	1:44.363	+4.165
12	29	(France) Éric Bernard	Lola-Lamborghini	1:44.998	1:44.496	+4.298
13	3	(Japan) Satoru Nakajima	Tyrrell-Ford	1:44.873	1:44.650	+4.452
14	15	(Brazil) Maurício Gugelmin	Leyton House-Judd	no time	1:45.193	+4.995
15	23	(Italy) Pierluigi Martini	Minardi-Ford	1:45.736	1:45.237	+5.039
16	11	(United Kingdom) Derek Warwick	Lotus-Lamborghini	1:45.364	1:45.244	+5.046
17	8	(Italy) Stefano Modena	Brabham-Judd	1:45.547	1:47.269	+5.349
18	10	(Italy) Alex Caffi	Arrows-Ford	1:46.201	1:45.604	+5.406
19	9	(Italy) Michele Alboreto	Arrows-Ford	1:45.871	1:45.755	+5.557
20	12	(United Kingdom) Martin Donnelly	Lotus-Lamborghini	1:47.723	1:45.790	+5.592
21	7	(Australia) David Brabham	Brabham-Judd	1:46.110	1:46.518	+5.912
22	25	(Italy) Nicola Larini	Ligier-Ford	1:47.068	1:46.187	+5.989
23	21	(Italy) Emanuele Pirro	Dallara-Ford	1:46.904	1:46.506	+6.308
24	26	(France) Philippe Alliot	Ligier-Ford	1:46.596	1:57.287	+6.398
25	36	(Finland) JJ Lehto	Onyx-Ford	1:48.856	1:46.867	+6.669
26	35	(Switzerland) Gregor Foitek	Onyx-Ford	1:47.209	1:47.726	+7.011
27	14	(France) Olivier Grouillard	Osella-Ford	1:47.429	1:48.172	+7.231
28	24	(Italy) Paolo Barilla	Minardi-Ford	1:47.747	1:47.958	+7.549
29	18	(France) Yannick Dalmas	AGS-Ford	1:47.789	1:47.874	+7.591
30	22	(Italy) Andrea de Cesaris	Dallara-Ford	1:48.118	1:48.032	+7.834

== Race ==
=== Race report ===
The circuit's fast nature resulted in several engine failures, although the four big teams of the era took all six points-paying positions. The first driver to retire with an engine failure was Michele Alboreto on lap 11, he was then followed out by Mauricio Gugelmin and David Brabham 2 laps later along with Pierluigi Martini in the only Minardi by lap 21. Also involved with the engine failures were Nelson Piquet in the Benetton on lap 24 and Satoru Nakajima in the Tyrrell one lap later.

Berger got a stronger start off the line than Senna did but the Brazilian was able to hold on to the lead through the first corner. Senna lead the first lap ahead of Berger, Prost, Mansell, Patrese and Piquet. The order of the top 6 remained the same until the 11th lap when Piquet made an attempt to pass Patrese in the Williams, but had to take an escape road and was overtaken for 6th by teammate Nannini as a result. Meanwhile Mansell in the second Ferrari missed his braking point at the Ostkurve chicane on lap 14 and broke his front wing which also damaged his car, his fourth position was not lost but he was forced to retire in the pits 2 laps later due to the damage being too great. Back upfront Nannini overtook Patrese for the lead as the Williams and Benetton teams had planned to go the race distance with no pit-stops. However, the gamble for Williams had failed since Patrese's tires were badly damaged in the closing stages and was forced to eventually pit. While Boutsen in the other Williams was eventually overtaken by Prost for fourth position and by teammate Patrese for 5th, but managed to hold on to 6th for the closing laps. Senna eventually passed Nannini on lap 34 whilst overlapping JJ Lehto and eventually took the victory. Ayrton Senna won the race by 6 seconds ahead of Alessandro Nannini in the remaining Benetton, Gerhard Berger in the second McLaren, Alain Prost in the remaining Ferrari, Riccardo Patrese and Thierry Boutsen in the Williams.

Both Onyx Grand Prix teammates JJ Lehto and Gregor Foitek both got their renamed Monteverdi ORE-1Bs into the race, the last time either car would qualify for a race prior to the team's dissolution in August.

Philippe Alliot was disqualified because marshals helped his Ligier JS33B rejoin the race after being blocked by the spinning Dallara 190 of Emanuele Pirro. Fastest lap of the race was set by Thierry Boutsen in his Williams, his first such achievement.

=== Race classification ===
Pos	No	Driver	Constructor	Laps	Time/Retired	Grid	Points
1	27	(Brazil) Ayrton Senna	McLaren-Honda	45	1:20:47.164	1	9
2	19	(Italy) Alessandro Nannini	Benetton-Ford	45	+ 6.520	9	6
3	28	(Austria) Gerhard Berger	McLaren-Honda	45	+ 8.553	2	4
4	1	(France) Alain Prost	Ferrari	45	+ 45.270	3	3
5	6	(Italy) Riccardo Patrese	Williams-Renault	45	+ 48.028	5	2
6	5	(Belgium) Thierry Boutsen	Williams-Renault	45	+ 1:21.491	6	1
7	16	(Italy) Ivan Capelli	Leyton House-Judd	44	+ 1 lap	10	
8	11	(United Kingdom) Derek Warwick	Lotus-Lamborghini	44	+ 1 lap	16	
9	10	(Italy) Alex Caffi	Arrows-Ford	44	+ 1 lap	18	
10	25	(Italy) Nicola Larini	Ligier-Ford	43	+ 2 laps	22	
11	4	(France) Jean Alesi	Tyrrell-Ford	40	Transmission	8	
NC	36	(Finland) JJ Lehto	Onyx-Ford	39	+6 laps	25	
Ret	29	(France) Éric Bernard	Lola-Lamborghini	35	Fuel pump	12	
Ret	30	(Japan) Aguri Suzuki	Lola-Lamborghini	33	Clutch	11	
Ret	3	(Japan) Satoru Nakajima	Tyrrell-Ford	24	Engine	13	
Ret	20	(Brazil) Nelson Piquet	Benetton-Ford	23	Engine	7	
Ret	23	(Italy) Pierluigi Martini	Minardi-Ford	20	Engine	15	
Ret	35	(Switzerland) Gregor Foitek	Onyx-Ford	19	Spun off	26	
Ret	2	(United Kingdom) Nigel Mansell	Ferrari	15	Broken wing	4	
Ret	15	(Brazil) Maurício Gugelmin	Leyton House-Judd	12	Engine	14	
Ret	7	(Australia) David Brabham	Brabham-Judd	12	Engine	21	
Ret	9	(Italy) Michele Alboreto	Arrows-Ford	10	Engine	19	
Ret	12	(United Kingdom) Martin Donnelly	Lotus-Lamborghini	1	Clutch	20	
Ret	8	(Italy) Stefano Modena	Brabham-Judd	0	Clutch	17	
Ret	21	(Italy) Emanuele Pirro	Dallara-Ford	0	Collision	23	
DSQ	26	(France) Philippe Alliot	Ligier-Ford	0	Outside assistance	24	
DNQ	14	(France) Olivier Grouillard	Osella-Ford				
DNQ	24	(Italy) Paolo Barilla	Minardi-Ford				
DNQ	18	(France) Yannick Dalmas	AGS-Ford				
DNQ	22	(Italy) Andrea de Cesaris	Dallara-Ford				
DNPQ	17	(Italy) Gabriele Tarquini	AGS-Ford				
DNPQ	33	(Brazil) Roberto Moreno	EuroBrun-Judd				
DNPQ	31	(Belgium) Bertrand Gachot	Coloni-Ford				
DNPQ	34	(Italy) Claudio Langes	EuroBrun-Judd				
DNPQ	39	(Italy) Bruno Giacomelli	Life				

== Championship standings after the race ==
Drivers' Championship standings

Pos	Driver	Points
1	(Brazil) Ayrton Senna	48
2	(France) Alain Prost	44
3	(Austria) Gerhard Berger	29
4	(Belgium) Thierry Boutsen	18
5	(Brazil) Nelson Piquet	18

Constructors' Championship standings

Pos	Constructor	Points
1	(United Kingdom) McLaren-Honda	77
2	(Italy) Ferrari	57
3	(United Kingdom) Benetton-Ford	31
4	(United Kingdom) Williams-Renault	30
5	(United Kingdom) Tyrrell-Ford	14

- Note: Only the top five positions are included for both sets of standings.

Previous race: 1990 British Grand Prix	FIA Formula One World Championship; 1990 season	Next race: 1990 Hungarian Grand Prix
Previous race: 1989 German Grand Prix	German Grand Prix	Next race: 1991 German Grand Prix
