= Ligier JS47 =

- Category: Formula Three
- Constructor: Ligier
- Successor: Ligier JS F3

Technical specifications
- Chassis: Carbon fibre and Kevlar composite honeycomb monocoque covered in glass fiber composite-nomex body
- Suspension (front): Double wishbones, pushrod with mono-shock absorber system, and torsion-bar springs, anti-roll bar
- Suspension (rear): Double wishbones, pushrod with mono-shock absorber system and coils springs, anti-roll bar
- Length: 4,130 mm (163 in)
- Width: 1,770 mm (70 in) including tyres
- Height: 915 mm (36 in)
- Wheelbase: 2,750 mm (108 in)
- Engine: Various manufacturers (Fiat Novamotor, Ford Swindon, Honda-Mugen, Nissan Tomei, Opel-Spiess, Renault-Sodemo, Toyota-TOM'S) 2.0 L (122 cu in) DOHC inline-4 engine naturally-aspirated, longitudinally mounted in a mid-engined, rear-wheel drive layout
- Transmission: Ligier 6-speed sequential gearbox
- Power: ~ 240 hp (179 kW)
- Weight: 550 kg (1,213 lb) including driver
- Fuel: Various unleaded control fuel
- Lubricants: Various
- Brakes: Brembo ventilated carbon brake discs, 6-piston calipers and pads
- Tyres: Various

Competition history
- Debut: 2004

The Ligier JS47 is an open-wheel formula race car, designed, developed and produced by French manufacturer Ligier, specifically built to Formula 3 regulations, in 2004.
