= 1990 British Grand Prix =

- Race 8 of 16 in the 1990 Formula One World Championship
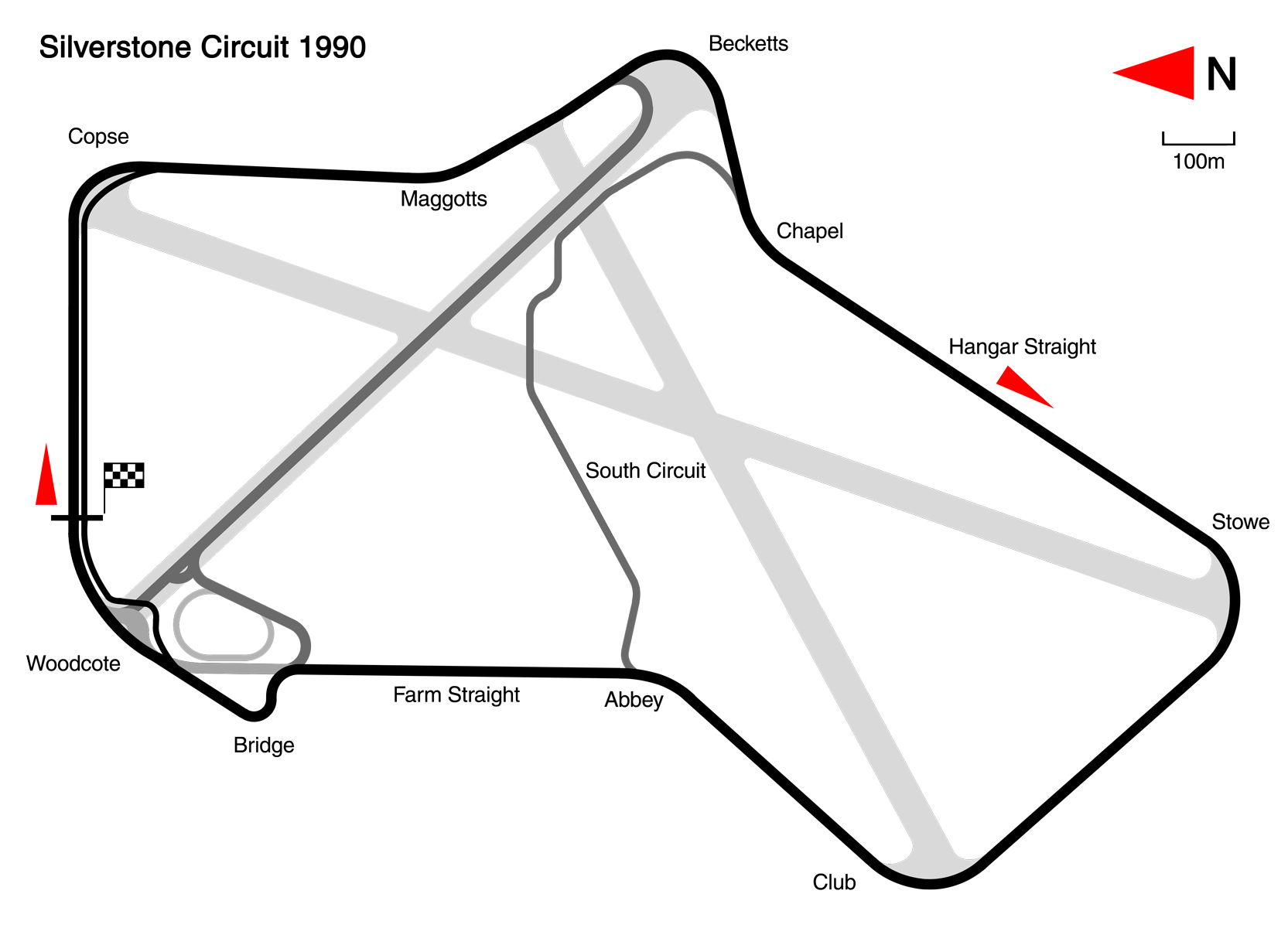

Race details
- Date: 15 July 1990
- Official name: XLIII Foster's British Grand Prix
- Location: Silverstone Circuit; Silverstone, Northamptonshire, England
- Course: Permanent racing facility
- Course length: 4.778 km (2.969 miles)
- Distance: 64 laps, 305.904 km (190.080 miles)
- Weather: Hot, dry, sunny

Pole position
Driver	(United Kingdom) Nigel Mansell	Ferrari
- Time: 1:07.428

Fastest lap
Driver	(United Kingdom) Nigel Mansell	Ferrari
- Time: 1:11.291 on lap 51

Podium
First	(France) Alain Prost	Ferrari
Second	(Belgium) Thierry Boutsen	Williams-Renault
Third	(Brazil) Ayrton Senna	McLaren-Honda

The 1990 British Grand Prix was a Formula One motor race held at Silverstone on 15 July 1990. It was the eighth race of the 1990 Formula One World Championship. It was the 45th British Grand Prix and the 26th to be held at Silverstone, which was the fastest circuit on the F1 calendar at the time. The race was held over 64 laps of the 4.78-kilometre (2.97 mi) circuit for a race distance of 305.9 kilometres (190.1 mi).

The race was won by Frenchman Alain Prost, driving a Ferrari. Prost's teammate, local hero Nigel Mansell, took pole position and led before retiring with a gearbox failure nine laps from the end. Belgian Thierry Boutsen finished second in a Williams-Renault, with Brazilian Ayrton Senna third in a McLaren-Honda.

The win, Prost's third in succession and fourth of the season, gave him the lead of the Drivers' Championship, two points ahead of Senna.

At this event Ricardo Patrese made history by becoming the first ever F1 driver to compete in 200 F1 GP's.

== Qualifying ==
=== Pre-qualifying report ===
In Friday morning pre-qualifying, the Larrousse-Lolas were again first and second, their fifth 1–2 of the season, with Éric Bernard nearly a second faster than team-mate Aguri Suzuki. As at the previous Grand Prix in France, third fastest was Gabriele Tarquini in the AGS. This time, the fourth pre-qualifying spot went to Olivier Grouillard in the sole Osella.

These four were comfortably faster than the other runners, the fastest of which was Roberto Moreno in a revised EuroBrun in fifth place. Sixth was Yannick Dalmas in the other AGS, his sixth failure to pre-qualify so far this season. Claudio Langes was seventh in the other, unrevised EuroBrun, with Bertrand Gachot a distant eighth in the Coloni after its engine destroyed itself yet again. Subaru ended their involvement with the Coloni team after this Grand Prix, with eight consecutive failures to pre-qualify, and the team were to source new engines for the next race in Germany. The Life team had no pit garage in which to prepare their car, and worked on the grass near the pits. Their car, still driven by Bruno Giacomelli, suffered an electrical failure after five laps, and was bottom of the time sheets again. Team manager Sergio Barbasio announced that they would stick with the hopeless in-house W12 engine, citing a lack of time to prepare the chassis for the Judd CV engines purchased from Lotus. However, Italian sources claimed that Life had simply been unable to complete the purchase due to lack of funds.

=== Pre-qualifying classification ===
Pos	No	Driver	Constructor	Time	Gap
1	29	(France) Éric Bernard	Lola-Lamborghini	1:10.254	
2	30	(Japan) Aguri Suzuki	Lola-Lamborghini	1:11.128	+0.874
3	17	(Italy) Gabriele Tarquini	AGS-Ford	1:11.516	+1.262
4	14	(France) Olivier Grouillard	Osella-Ford	1:11.953	+1.699
5	33	(Brazil) Roberto Moreno	EuroBrun-Judd	1:12.554	+2.300
6	18	(France) Yannick Dalmas	AGS-Ford	1:12.653	+2.399
7	34	(Italy) Claudio Langes	EuroBrun-Judd	1:15.059	+4.805
8	31	(Belgium) Bertrand Gachot	Coloni-Subaru	1:19.230	+8.976
9	39	(Italy) Bruno Giacomelli	Life	1:25.947	+15.693

=== Qualifying report ===
Mansell qualified on pole more than half a second in front of Senna, at an average speed of 158 mph (252 km/h).

=== Qualifying classification ===
Pos	No	Driver	Constructor	Q1	Q2	Gap
1	2	(United Kingdom) Nigel Mansell	Ferrari	1:08.336	1:07.428	
2	27	(Brazil) Ayrton Senna	McLaren-Honda	1:08.071	1:09.055	+0.643
3	28	(Austria) Gerhard Berger	McLaren-Honda	1:08.246	1:08.674	+0.818
4	5	(Belgium) Thierry Boutsen	Williams-Renault	1:09.102	1:08.291	+0.863
5	1	(France) Alain Prost	Ferrari	1:09.110	1:08.336	+0.908
6	4	(France) Jean Alesi	Tyrrell-Ford	1:09.147	1:08.370	+0.942
7	6	(Italy) Riccardo Patrese	Williams-Renault	1:08.677	1:08.864	+1.249
8	29	(France) Éric Bernard	Lola-Lamborghini	1:09.560	1:09.003	+1.575
9	30	(Japan) Aguri Suzuki	Lola-Lamborghini	1:09.243	1:09.865	+1.815
10	16	(Italy) Ivan Capelli	Leyton House-Judd	1:10.691	1:09.308	+1.880
11	20	(Brazil) Nelson Piquet	Benetton-Ford	1:09.684	1:09.407	+1.979
12	3	(Japan) Satoru Nakajima	Tyrrell-Ford	1:09.937	1:09.608	+2.180
13	19	(Italy) Alessandro Nannini	Benetton-Ford	1:09.782	1:09.641	+2.213
14	12	(United Kingdom) Martin Donnelly	Lotus-Lamborghini	1:10.786	1:09.741	+2.313
15	15	(Brazil) Maurício Gugelmin	Leyton House-Judd	1:11.167	1:10.044	+2.616
16	11	(United Kingdom) Derek Warwick	Lotus-Lamborghini	1:10.552	1:10.092	+2.664
17	10	(Italy) Alex Caffi	Arrows-Ford	1:10.480	1:10.110	+2.682
18	23	(Italy) Pierluigi Martini	Minardi-Ford	1:10.568	1:10.303	+2.875
19	21	(Italy) Emanuele Pirro	Dallara-Ford	1:11.413	1:10.847	+3.419
20	8	(Italy) Stefano Modena	Brabham-Judd	1:11.070	1:11.600	+3.642
21	25	(Italy) Nicola Larini	Ligier-Ford	1:11.942	1:11.180	+3.752
22	26	(France) Philippe Alliot	Ligier-Ford	1:12.483	1:11.215	+3.787
23	22	(Italy) Andrea de Cesaris	Dallara-Ford	1:11.705	1:11.234	+3.806
24	24	(Italy) Paolo Barilla	Minardi-Ford	1:11.498	1:11.387	+3.959
25	9	(Italy) Michele Alboreto	Arrows-Ford	1:11.562	1:12.644	+4.134
26	17	(Italy) Gabriele Tarquini	AGS-Ford	1:12.506	1:11.681	+4.253
DNQ	14	(France) Olivier Grouillard	Osella-Ford	1:12.179	1:11.710	+4.282
DNQ	7	(Australia) David Brabham	Brabham-Judd	1:11.741	1:13.016	+4.313
DNQ	36	(Finland) JJ Lehto	Onyx-Ford	1:12.712	1:12.631	+5.203
DNQ	35	(Switzerland) Gregor Foitek	Onyx-Ford	1:13.413	1:13.271	+5.843

== Race ==
=== Race report ===
Local hero Nigel Mansell led until his gearbox began to malfunction. He was overtaken (against team orders, and to Mansell's chagrin) by Alain Prost and remained in second until his gearbox failed completely on lap 57. After retiring from the race Mansell famously threw his gloves into the crowd and announced he would retire from Formula One at the end of the season, a decision he later reversed.

Riccardo Patrese became the first driver ever to start 200 Grands Prix. On race day, he retired after damage was sustained in a collision with the Benetton of Alessandro Nannini on lap 27, whilst his team-mate Thierry Boutsen reached the podium and finished second.

Éric Bernard and Aguri Suzuki both scored the best results of their career up to this point. For Suzuki, it was the first points scoring finish of his career.

Ivan Capelli was the charger in the race. Starting 10th he spun early to avoid the collision between Patrese and Alessandro Nannini. Then racing with a broken exhaust header he charged hard, eventually passing Gerhard Berger for 3rd and for a time being the fastest driver on the track before retiring on lap 48 with a fuel leak.

Ligier needed at least a top eight finish to avoid pre-qualification, but Nicola Larini could not do better than 10th place, while teammate Philippe Alliot only managed to finish 13th.

This would be the last motor race on the original high-speed Silverstone circuit; the day after the race, a construction crew funded by Tom Walkinshaw immediately began work on reprofiling and incorporating the newly designed corners.

=== Race classification ===
Pos	No	Driver	Constructor	Laps	Time/Retired	Grid	Points
1	1	(France) Alain Prost	Ferrari	64	1:18:30.999	5	9
2	5	(Belgium) Thierry Boutsen	Williams-Renault	64	+ 39.092	4	6
3	27	(Brazil) Ayrton Senna	McLaren-Honda	64	+ 43.088	2	4
4	29	(France) Éric Bernard	Lola-Lamborghini	64	+ 1:15.302	8	3
5	20	(Brazil) Nelson Piquet	Benetton-Ford	64	+ 1:24.003	11	2
6	30	(Japan) Aguri Suzuki	Lola-Lamborghini	63	+ 1 lap	9	1
7	10	(Italy) Alex Caffi	Arrows-Ford	63	+ 1 lap	17	
8	4	(France) Jean Alesi	Tyrrell-Ford	63	+ 1 lap	6	
9	8	(Italy) Stefano Modena	Brabham-Judd	62	+ 2 laps	20	
10	25	(Italy) Nicola Larini	Ligier-Ford	62	+ 2 laps	21	
11	21	(Italy) Emanuele Pirro	Dallara-Ford	62	+ 2 laps	19	
12	24	(Italy) Paolo Barilla	Minardi-Ford	62	+ 2 laps	24	
13	26	(France) Philippe Alliot	Ligier-Ford	61	+ 3 laps	22	
14	28	(Austria) Gerhard Berger	McLaren-Honda	60	Throttle	3	
Ret	2	(United Kingdom) Nigel Mansell	Ferrari	55	Gearbox	1	
Ret	16	(Italy) Ivan Capelli	Leyton House-Judd	48	Fuel leak	10	
Ret	12	(United Kingdom) Martin Donnelly	Lotus-Lamborghini	48	Engine	14	
Ret	11	(United Kingdom) Derek Warwick	Lotus-Lamborghini	46	Engine	16	
Ret	17	(Italy) Gabriele Tarquini	AGS-Ford	41	Engine	26	
Ret	9	(Italy) Michele Alboreto	Arrows-Ford	37	Engine	25	
Ret	6	(Italy) Riccardo Patrese	Williams-Renault	26	Collision damage	7	
Ret	3	(Japan) Satoru Nakajima	Tyrrell-Ford	20	Electrical	12	
Ret	19	(Italy) Alessandro Nannini	Benetton-Ford	15	Collision	13	
Ret	22	(Italy) Andrea de Cesaris	Dallara-Ford	12	Fuel system	23	
Ret	23	(Italy) Pierluigi Martini	Minardi-Ford	3	Alternator	18	
DNS	15	(Brazil) Maurício Gugelmin	Leyton House-Judd	0	Fuel pump	15	
DNQ	14	(France) Olivier Grouillard	Osella-Ford				
DNQ	7	(Australia) David Brabham	Brabham-Judd				
DNQ	36	(Finland) JJ Lehto	Onyx-Ford				
DNQ	35	(Switzerland) Gregor Foitek	Onyx-Ford				
DNPQ	33	(Brazil) Roberto Moreno	EuroBrun-Judd				
DNPQ	18	(France) Yannick Dalmas	AGS-Ford				
DNPQ	34	(Italy) Claudio Langes	EuroBrun-Judd				
DNPQ	31	(Belgium) Bertrand Gachot	Coloni-Subaru				
DNPQ	39	(Italy) Bruno Giacomelli	Life				

== Championship standings after the race ==
Drivers' Championship standings

Pos	Driver	Points
1	(France) Alain Prost	41
2	(Brazil) Ayrton Senna	39
3	(Austria) Gerhard Berger	25
4	(Brazil) Nelson Piquet	18
5	(Belgium) Thierry Boutsen	17

Constructors' Championship standings

Pos	Constructor	Points
1	(United Kingdom) McLaren-Honda	64
2	(Italy) Ferrari	54
3	(United Kingdom) Williams-Renault	27
4	(United Kingdom) Benetton-Ford	25
5	(United Kingdom) Tyrrell-Ford	14

- Note: Only the top five positions are included for both sets of standings.

Previous race: 1990 French Grand Prix	FIA Formula One World Championship; 1990 season	Next race: 1990 German Grand Prix
Previous race: 1989 British Grand Prix	British Grand Prix	Next race: 1991 British Grand Prix
