= Frank Dernie =

British auto racing engineer

- Born: Frank William Dernie; 3 April 1950 (age 76); Lancashire, England
- Education: Kirkham Grammar School; Imperial College London
- Known for: Formula One engineer

Frank William Dernie (born 3 April 1950) is a British Formula One engineer. Dernie is credited with inventing active suspension, being the first engineer to use computer aided design, the first engineer to put a data logger on a formula one car and implemented the first on site wind tunnel (at Williams Grand Prix).

== Career ==
Dernie was brought up in Lancashire and educated at Kirkham Grammar School before he studied engineering at the Imperial College London university. Dernie was an apprentice with David Brown Ltd. His intention had been to get a job with Aston Martin since his ambition was to design racing cars. Whilst released from David Brown Ltd. as a student he managed to convince the university to let him do a 3rd year project to do with designing a racing car for himself, part of which ended up being a computer program to optimise racing car suspension, which with the naivety of youth he did not realise had never been done before. By the time he left Uni to return to David Browns they had sold Aston Martin and he ended up as a junior engineer in the Noise and Vibration section of the R&D dept. Where he did a lot of measurements, including designing his own transducers. During this time he had met an engineer from March who had started using his software and therefore Dernie had been analysing other engineering stuff for them, part time. He wanted to move a bit nearer the motor racing teams so looked for another noise and vibration job and got one at Garrard.

He joined the Hesketh F1 team for 1976, at the age of 26 designed his first Formula One racing car, the 308E. Frank Williams hired him to join Patrick Head at Williams Grand Prix Engineering in time to design the successful FW07 and FW08 cars. He also invented active suspension for use on the Williams car (introduced in 1987 winning its first race the Italian GP at Monza with Nelson Piquet), a few years later banned by FIA to increase competition).

In the early years Frank Dernie would hire the wind tunnel at Imperial College, London for testing aerodynamics. He suggested to Patrick Head that they should try to implement their own wind tunnel at the Williams factory in Didcot, Oxfordshire. Patrick agreed and made a phone call to a firm that had an old wind tunnel in sections. Williams negotiated a price. Frank Dernie, with help from Ross Brawn, wired up the electronic systems for the tunnel, and thus Williams became the first F1 team with their own dedicated wind tunnel facility to improve aerodynamic development. Frank Dernie was also the first ever Formula One engineer to use computers to aid design, although such software did not exist, initially he had to write his own machine code in order to do so. Frank Dernie is also credited with being the first Formula One engineer to implement a data logger on A Formula One car.

For 1989, Dernie joined Lotus, replacing Gérard Ducarouge as Technical Director. However, the team lost major sponsorship and were unable to fund essential R&D to make a competitive car. Ross Brawn, who had worked with Frank at Williams encouraged him to join Benetton for 1991 where he was instrumental in the development of the car, but in particular to improve the race team. At the start of 1992 Dernie was at the Ligier team during the tests where Alain Prost was evaluating the car, noting that he was around 1.5 to 2 seconds quicker than regular driver Boutsen could lap at. Dernie went to Ligier for the 1995 season to become technical director.

He moved to Arrows for 1996 but only stayed for a year. Dernie left Formula One for the first time to join Lola in order to help the team re-establish itself in Champ Cars after MasterCard Lola's disastrous F1 foray in 1997.

In 2002, Dernie left Lola to return to Williams as a consultant engineer in 2003.

He left in early 2007 and in August the same year joined the Toyota F1 team as a consultant in 'aerodynamic and chassis related matters.'
