= Brabham BT56 =

Formula One racing car

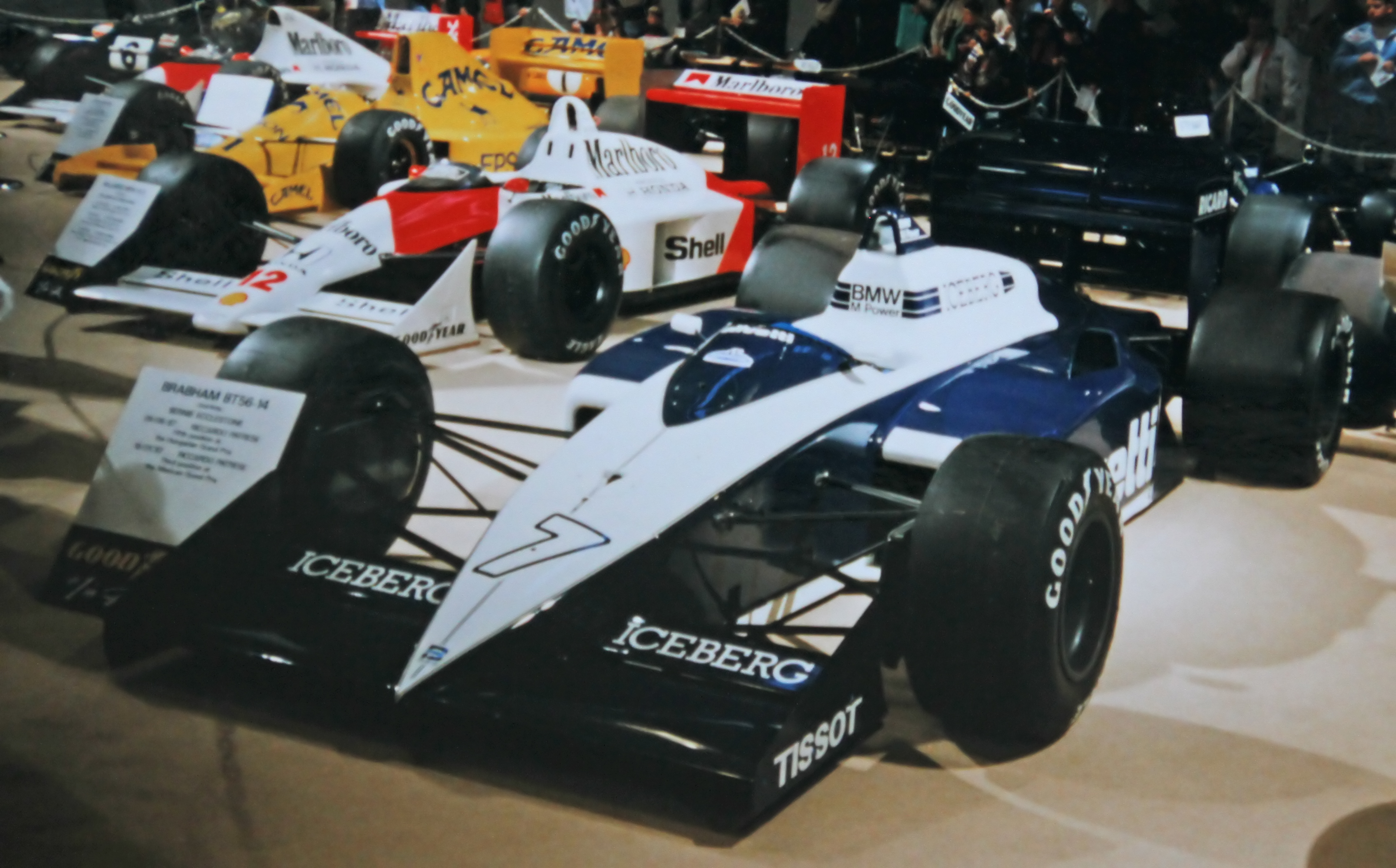
- Category: Formula One
- Constructor: Brabham
- Designers: John Baldwin (Technical Director); Sergio Rinland (Chief Designer); Paul Rosche (Chief Engine Designer (BMW))
- Predecessor: BT55
- Successor: BT58

Technical specifications
- Chassis: Carbon fibre and Kevlar composite monocoque
- Suspension (front): Pullrod double wishbone
- Suspension (rear): Pushrod double wishbone
- Axle track: Front: 1,778 mm (70.0 in); Rear: 1,651 mm (65.0 in)
- Wheelbase: 2,832 mm (111.5 in)
- Engine: BMW M12/13, 1,499 cc (91.5 cu in), Straight 4, turbo (4.0 Bar limited), mid-engine, longitudinally mounted
- Transmission: Brabham / Weismann 6-speed manual
- Weight: 545 kg (1,202 lb)
- Fuel: Castrol
- Tyres: Goodyear

Competition history
- Notable entrants: Motor Racing Developments
- Notable drivers: 7. (Italy) Riccardo Patrese; 7. (Italy) Stefano Modena; 8. (Italy) Andrea de Cesaris
- Debut: 1987 Brazilian Grand Prix
Races	Wins	Poles	F/Laps
16	0	0	0
- Constructors' Championships: 0
- Drivers' Championships: 0

The Brabham BT56 was a Formula One car designed by John Baldwin and Sergio Rinland and raced by the Brabham team in the 1987 Formula One World Championship. It was driven by Andrea de Cesaris, Riccardo Patrese and Stefano Modena; both de Cesaris and Patrese scored a 3rd place driving the BT56.

== Design ==
After a disappointing 1986 season with the BT55, the team reverted to a more conventional design in 1987. Long time Brabham designer Gordon Murray had moved to McLaren leaving the BT56 as the first Brabham car not designed by Murray since the Ralph Bellamy designed Brabham BT37 that raced in the 1972 and 1973 seasons.

The car was powered by the straight 4 turbocharged BMW engine and raced on Goodyear tyres. Brabham finished 8th in the 1987 Constructors' Championship with 10 points scored. This was the last Formula One Car until 2000 to use BMW engines, not counting the Megatron-badged engines used by Arrows in 1988.

This was the last Brabham to use a turbocharged engine. It was also the last Brabham designed while longtime owner Bernie Ecclestone ran the team: he sold the team for US$5 million to Swiss businessman Walter Brun at the end of 1988 after buying it in 1972 for US$120,000 from the team's co-founder Ron Tauranac.

== Racing history ==
The BT56 was not a very competitive car; although it was quicker than some others (Patrese ran as high as second before retiring at the San Marino Grand Prix that year) it was nowhere near as competitive as the Williams, McLaren, Ferrari or Lotus cars that year.

It was also a very unreliable car; they had 7 finishes combined out of 16 races. Patrese had a third place in Mexico, although earlier in the season he had been unlucky to lose second place at the San Marino Grand Prix with alternator failure.

De Cesaris only finished one race, a third place at Belgium. Although he had a bad reputation for crashing, most of his retirements were due to mechanical failures. Some suspected that this was down to his questionable temperament and his harsh treatment of the car.

Brabham finished 8th in the 1987 Constructors' Championship with 10 points scored.

Brabham would skip Formula One for the 1988 season, and would return in 1989 with the naturally aspirated Judd V8 powered Brabham BT58.

== Complete Formula One results ==
(key)

Year	Entrant	Engine	Tyres	Drivers	1	2	3	4	5	6	7	8	9	10	11	12	13	14	15	16	Pts.	WCC
1987	Motor Racing Developments	BMW M12/13; S4 tc	G		BRA	SMR	BEL	MON	DET	FRA	GBR	GER	HUN	AUT	ITA	POR	ESP	MEX	JPN	AUS	10	8th
1987	Motor Racing Developments	BMW M12/13; S4 tc	G	Riccardo Patrese	Ret	9	Ret	Ret	9	Ret	Ret	Ret	5	Ret	Ret	Ret	13	3	11		10	8th
1987	Motor Racing Developments	BMW M12/13; S4 tc	G	Stefano Modena																Ret	10	8th
1987	Motor Racing Developments	BMW M12/13; S4 tc	G	Andrea de Cesaris	Ret	Ret	3†	Ret	Ret	Ret	Ret	Ret	Ret	Ret	Ret	Ret	Ret	Ret	Ret	8†	10	8th

† Driver did not finish the Grand Prix, but was classified as he completed over 90% of the race distance.
