= Brabham BT59 =

Formula One racing car

Brabham BT59 Brabham BT59Y
- Category: Formula One
- Constructor: Brabham
- Designers: Sergio Rinland (Technical Director); Hans Fouche (Head of Aerodynamics)
- Predecessor: BT58
- Successor: BT60Y

Technical specifications
- Chassis: Carbon fibre and Kevlar monocoque
- Axle track: Front: 1,803 in (4,579.6 cm); Rear: 1,701 in (4,320.5 cm)
- Wheelbase: 2,921 in (7,419.3 cm)
- Engine: 1990: Judd EV, 3,496 cc (213.3 cu in), 76° V8, NA, mid-engine, longitudinally mounted. 1991: Yamaha OX99, 3,498 cc (213.5 cu in), 70° V12, NA, mid-engine, longitudinally mounted.
- Transmission: Brabham 6-speed manual
- Fuel: 1990: Elf; 1991: BP
- Tyres: Pirelli

Competition history
- Notable entrants: Motor Racing Developments
- Notable drivers: 7. (Australia) David Brabham; 8. (Italy) Stefano Modena; 7. (United Kingdom) Martin Brundle; 8. (United Kingdom) Mark Blundell
- Debut: 1990 San Marino Grand Prix
Races	Wins	Poles	F/Laps
18	0	0	0
- Constructors' Championships: 0
- Drivers' Championships: 0

The Brabham BT59 was a Formula One racing car designed by Sergio Rinland and Hans Fouche for the Brabham team which raced in the 1990 and 1991 Formula One World Championships. It made its debut at the 1990 San Marino Grand Prix and continued until the first two races of 1991.

== 1990 ==
The team's cars were driven by Australian David Brabham, the youngest son of team founder Sir Jack Brabham, and one of the team's 1989 drivers, Italian Stefano Modena. The car was powered by the Judd V8 engine and ran on Pirelli tyres.

After a promising first half of the 1989 season which saw Modena finish 3rd in Monaco, Brabham began to fall back down the grid. Lack of money and lack of power from the Judd V8 as well as inferior Pirelli rubber not helping the team in their quest to return to the top of Formula One. The best result achieved in 1990 was a seventh place at the Canadian Grand Prix driven by Modena.

== 1991 ==
For the 1991 season, the car was dubbed BT59Y and fitted with a Yamaha OX99 V12 engine. Driven by British drivers Martin Brundle and Mark Blundell, the BT59Y was used only in the first two races and then replaced by the Brabham BT60Y.

== Complete Formula One results ==
(key)

Year	Entrant	Chassis	Engine	Tyres	Drivers	1	2	3	4	5	6	7	8	9	10	11	12	13	14	15	16	Pts.	WCC
1990	Motor Racing Developments	BT59	Judd V8	P		USA	BRA	SMR	MON	CAN	MEX	FRA	GBR	GER	HUN	BEL	ITA	POR	ESP	JPN	AUS	2*	9th
1990	Motor Racing Developments	BT59	Judd V8	P	David Brabham			DNQ	Ret	DNQ	Ret	15	DNQ	Ret	DNQ	Ret	DNQ	Ret	DNQ	Ret	Ret	2*	9th
1990	Motor Racing Developments	BT59	Judd V8	P	Stefano Modena			Ret	Ret	7	11	13	9	Ret	Ret	17	Ret	Ret	Ret	Ret	12	2*	9th
1991	Motor Racing Developments	BT59Y	Yamaha V12	P		USA	BRA	SMR	MON	CAN	MEX	FRA	GBR	GER	HUN	BEL	ITA	POR	ESP	JPN	AUS	3	9th
1991	Motor Racing Developments	BT59Y	Yamaha V12	P	Martin Brundle	11	12															3	9th
1991	Motor Racing Developments	BT59Y	Yamaha V12	P	Mark Blundell	Ret	Ret															3	9th

* All points scored with the BT58
