= March CG891 =

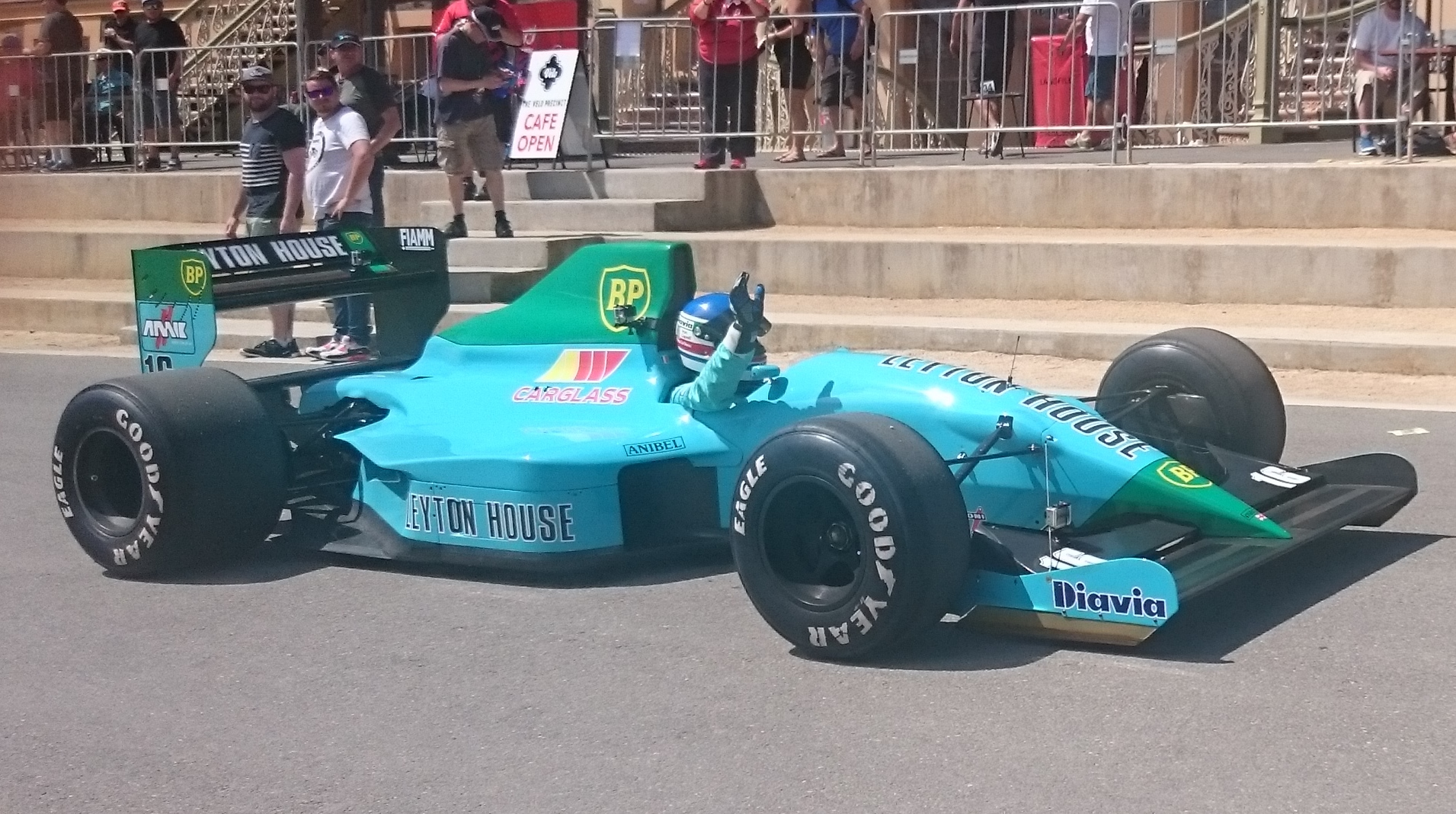
- March CG891 (pictured in 2016)
- Category: Formula One
- Constructor: March Engineering
- Designer: Adrian Newey
- Predecessor: 881
- Successor: CG901

Technical specifications
- Chassis: Carbon fibre monocoque
- Axle track: Front: 1,778 mm (70.0 in); Rear: 1,651 mm (65.0 in)
- Wheelbase: 2,794 mm (110.0 in)
- Engine: Judd EV, 3,496 cc (213.3 cu in), 76° V8, NA, mid-engine, longitudinally mounted,
- Transmission: March 6-speed manual
- Fuel: BP
- Tyres: Goodyear

Competition history
- Notable entrants: Leyton House March Racing Team
- Notable drivers: 15. (Brazil) Maurício Gugelmin; 16. (Italy) Ivan Capelli
- Debut: 1989 Monaco Grand Prix
Races	Wins	Poles	F/Laps
14	0	0	1
- Constructors' Championships: 0
- Drivers' Championships: 0

The March CG891 was a Formula One racing car designed by Adrian Newey and raced by March Racing Team in the 1989 season, driven by Ivan Capelli and Maurício Gugelmin. The car's best result was seventh place, achieved three times by Gugelmin. It also took the fastest lap at the 1989 French Grand Prix.

== Design and development ==
Designed by Adrian Newey, the March CG891 used the aerodynamic concept he had originally conceived for the previous year's car, the March 881, but was much more refined. The monocoque, of carbon fibre composite, was particularly slimline. An inboard gear cluster was used to accommodate the presence of a full-width diffuser panel at the rear of the chassis. The car's suspension used a push-rod double wishbone configuration, both front and rear. The wheelbase was 2,933 millimetres (115.5 in), its front track was 1,778 millimetres (70.0 in) and its rear track 1,651 millimetres (65.0 in).

The car was powered by a Judd EV 3.5 litre V8 engine in an exclusive arrangement with John Judd's Engine Developments company. The engine was rated as having 625 bhp with a maximum rpm of 11,500. A Magneti Marelli ignition was used in lieu of a conventional distributor, since the Judd EV had a narrower vee angle of 78°. Fuel and oil was provided by BP, and the car ran on Goodyear tyres.

The CG891 carried sponsorship from Leyton House (the title sponsor for the team), BP, Philips, Autoglass, Daivia, Cobra, Osama, AMK and Fiamm. A total of five CG891 chassis were constructed during the 1989 season. The CG in the car's designation stood for Cesare Gariboldi, a Leyton House March team manager who was killed in a road accident in the winter of 1988/1989.

== Racing history ==
The March CG891 was introduced at the Monaco Grand Prix, the March 881 having served duty for the March Racing Team in the first two races of the year. Gugelmin qualified in 14th while Capelli was 22nd on the grid. He had to revert to the 881 for part of qualifying as his CG891 developed electrical problems. Both drivers failed to finish although Capelli was still classified in 11th. This was the Italian's first of only two classified finishes all year, the other coming in Belgium, where he placed 12th. Gugelmin's best finish was seventh, achieved three times; in Belgium, Japan and Australia.

At the French Grand Prix, after a start-line accident forced Gugelmin to use the spare car for the race, he went on to achieve the fastest lap of the race although unclassified at the finish, nine laps behind the winner. The French race had been particularly promising for the team; Capelli had run as high as second at one stage but retired with engine problems.

Many of the March CG891's reliability problems was due to the casing used for the inboard gear cluster; this proved to have some flex and resulted in some gearbox failures in the first part of the season until the walls of the casing were made thicker. Some other failures were due to the electrical paraphernalia of the Judd EV, with only the odd piston and valvegear issues. Although neither Gugelmin or Capelli scored a points finish with the CG891, the team finished the 1989 Constructors' Championship in 12th, having achieved four points. This was due to Gugelmin's third place with the 881 at the opening race of the year, the Brazilian Grand Prix.

== Complete Formula One results ==
(key) (Results in bold indicate pole position; results in italics indicate fastest lap)

Year	Entrant	Chassis	Engine	Tyres	Driver	1	2	3	4	5	6	7	8	9	10	11	12	13	14	15	16	Pts.	WCC
1989	Leyton House March Racing Team	CG891	Judd EV 3.5 V8	**G**		BRA	SMR	MON	MEX	USA	CAN	FRA	GBR	GER	HUN	BEL	ITA	POR	ESP	JPN	AUS	**4***	**12th**
1989	Leyton House March Racing Team	CG891	Judd EV 3.5 V8	**G**	Maurício Gugelmin			Ret	DNQ	DSQ	Ret	NC	Ret	Ret	Ret	7	Ret	10	Ret	7	7	**4***	**12th**
1989	Leyton House March Racing Team	CG891	Judd EV 3.5 V8	**G**	Ivan Capelli			11	Ret	Ret	Ret	Ret	Ret	Ret	Ret	12	Ret	Ret	Ret	Ret	Ret	**4***	**12th**

* All four points for 1989 were scored with the 881
