= EuroBrun ER188 =

EuroBrun ER188 EuroBrun ER188B
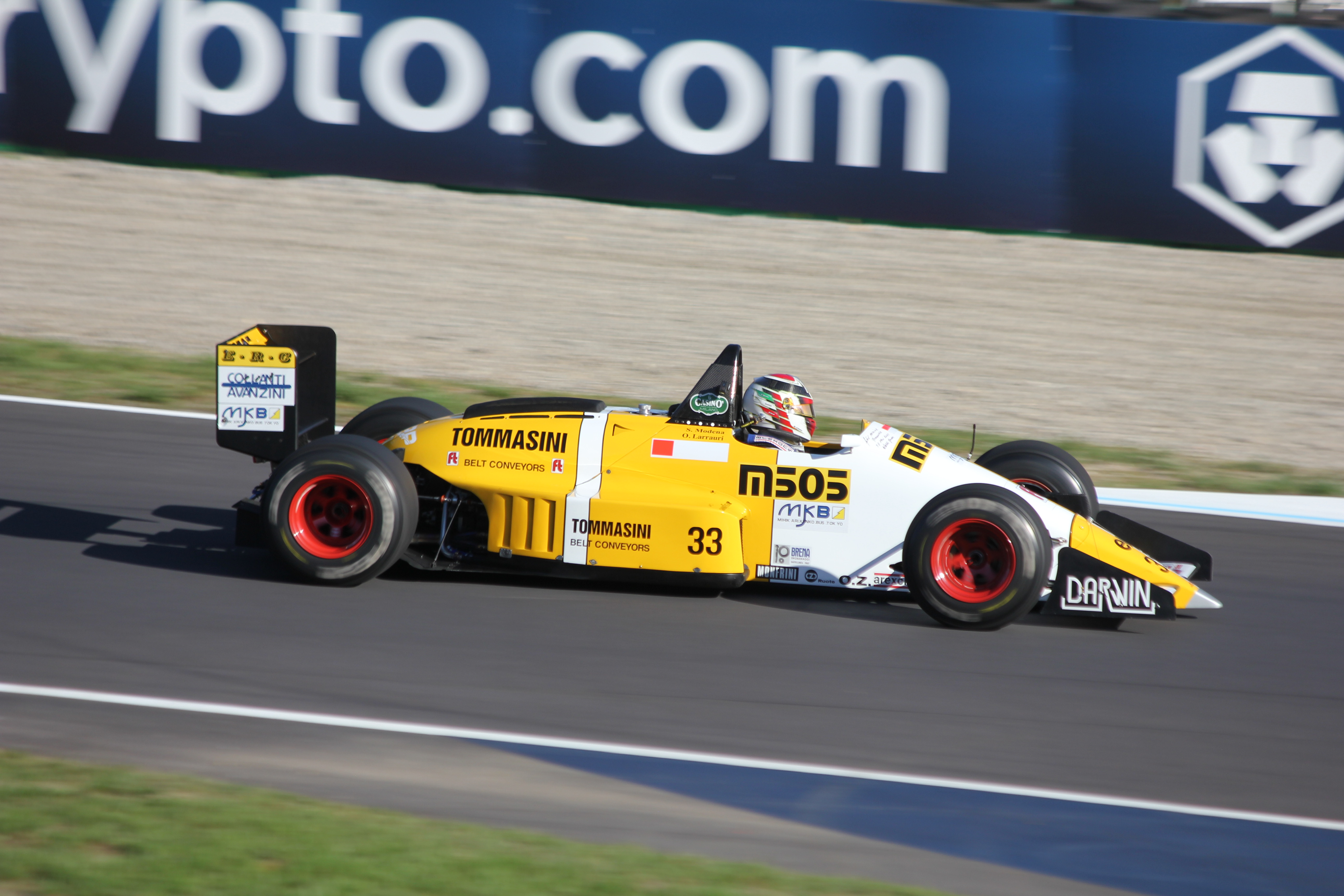
- Category: Formula One
- Constructor: EuroBrun
- Designers: Mario Tollentino (Technical Director); Bruno Zava (Chief Designer)
- Successor: ER189

Technical specifications
- Chassis: Carbon fibre monocoque
- Suspension (front): Double wishbones, pushrods
- Suspension (rear): Double wishbones, 188-pullrods 188B-pushrods
- Engine: Cosworth DFZ, 3,494 cc (213.2 cu in), 90° V8, NA, mid-engine, longitudinally mounted
- Transmission: EuroBrun / Hewland 6-speed manual
- Fuel: Elf
- Tyres: 1988: Goodyear; 1989: Pirelli

Competition history
- Notable entrants: EuroBrun
- Notable drivers: 32. (Argentina) Oscar Larrauri; 33. (Italy) Stefano Modena; 33. (Switzerland) Gregor Foitek
- Debut: 1988 Brazilian Grand Prix
Races	Wins	Poles	F/Laps
24	0	0	0
- Constructors' Championships: 0
- Drivers' Championships: 0

The EuroBrun ER188 was a Formula One car built and raced by the EuroBrun team for the 1988 Formula One season. The car was designed by Mario Tolentino and was powered by a normally aspirated Cosworth DFZ engine. Three ER188 chassis were produced.

Two cars were entered for 1987 Formula 3000 champion Stefano Modena of Italy and long-time Brun sports car stalwart, 33-year-old F1 rookie, Argentine Oscar Larrauri.

== 1988 ==
Despite a solid, if unspectacular start to the season, EuroBrun were struggling as money ran low. There was internal trouble when in May 1988 Brun unsuccessfully tried to replace Larrauri with German driver Christian Danner. It turned out that the German driver was too tall for the monocoque of the ER188. Since the team had no money for any modification it kept Larrauri in the second car to the end of the season, much to the annoyance of most of the other drivers as the Argentine had gained the unwanted reputation of being slow and hard to pass, especially when being lapped as the EuroBruns were often.

In the first eight events Larrauri only missed the cut twice and Modena would have qualified for them all were it not for two disqualifications for missing a weight check in practice at Monaco, and for having too high a rear wing in Mexico. Starts didn't turn into finishes, with engine failures, clutch and gearbox problems, and even a flat battery meaning that Modena's 11th place at the Hungarian Grand Prix would be the car's best result.

At the end of the season in December the team entered an ER188 for Fabrizio Barbazza in the 1988 Formula One Indoor Trophy at the Bologna Motor show. Barbazza was knocked out in the first round by the Minardi of Luis Pérez-Sala.

== 1989 ==
For the 1989 Formula One season the car was updated to ER188B specification and used a Judd CV V8 engine and Pirelli tyres. The team entered just one car for rookie Gregor Foitek.

Foitek would only make it through Friday pre-qualifying once, at the first race in Brazil but he failed to qualify for the race.

The replacement ER189 designed by George Ryton was introduced at the German Grand Prix.

== Complete Formula One results ==
(key)

Year	Chassis	Engines	Tyres	Driver(s)	1	2	3	4	5	6	7	8	9	10	11	12	13	14	15	16	Points	WCC
1988	ER188	Ford DFZ V8	G		BRA	SMR	MON	MEX	CAN	DET	FRA	GBR	GER	HUN	BEL	ITA	POR	ESP	JPN	AUS	0	NC
1988	ER188	Ford DFZ V8	G	(Argentina) Oscar Larrauri	Ret	DNQ	Ret	13	Ret	Ret	Ret	DNQ	16	DNQ	DNPQ	DNPQ	DNPQ	DNQ	DNQ	Ret	0	NC
1988	ER188	Ford DFZ V8	G	(Italy) Stefano Modena	Ret	NC	EX	EX	12	Ret	14	12	Ret	11	DNQ	DNQ	DNQ	13	DNQ	Ret	0	NC
1989	ER188B	Judd CV V8	P		BRA	SMR	MON	MEX	USA	CAN	FRA	GBR	GER	HUN	BEL	ITA	POR	ESP	JPN	AUS	0	NC
1989	ER188B	Judd CV V8	P	(Switzerland) Gregor Foitek	DNQ	DNPQ	DNPQ	DNPQ	DNPQ	DNPQ	DNPQ	DNPQ			DNPQ						0	NC
