= Stefano Modena =

Italian racing driver (born 1963)

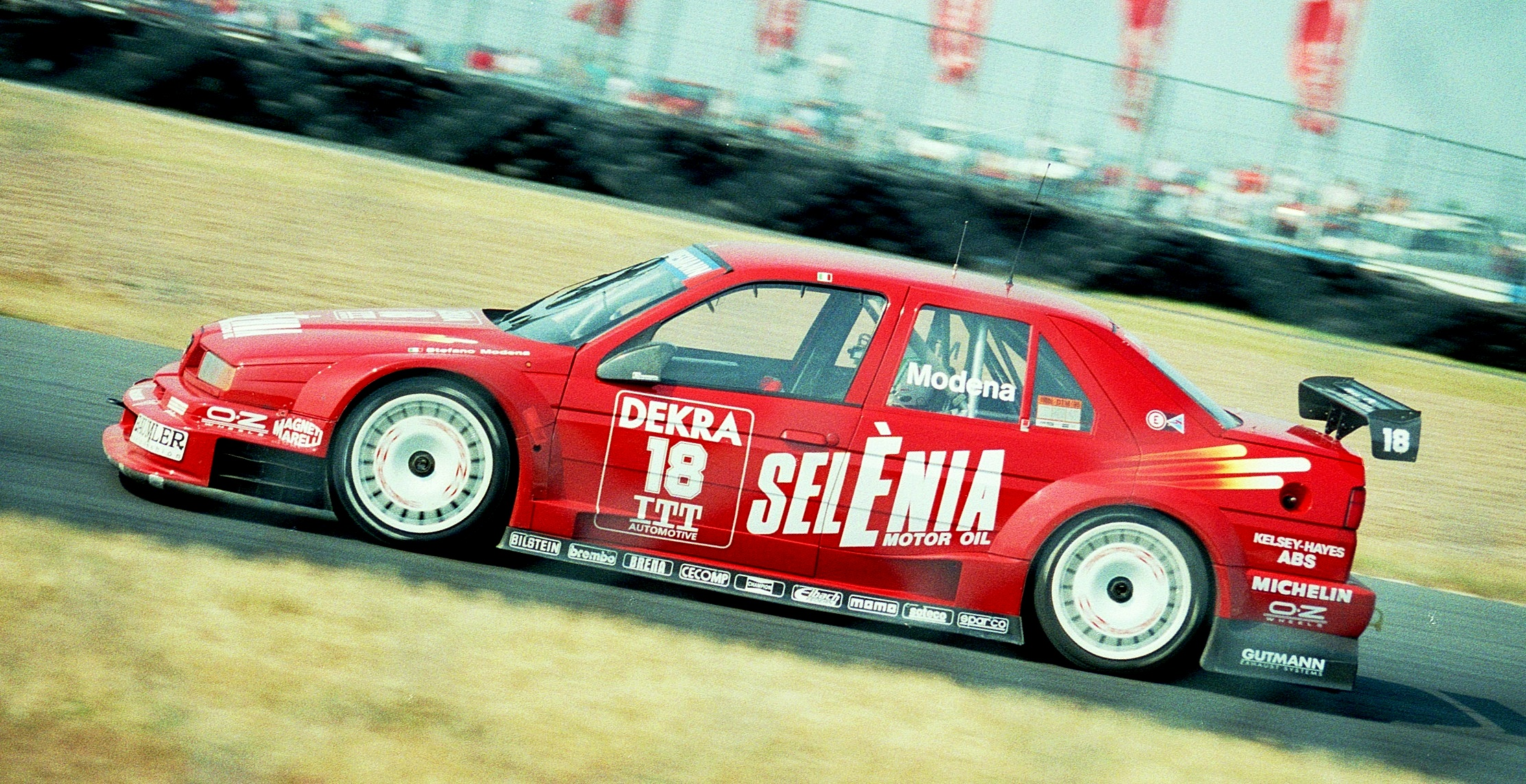
- Born: 12 May 1963 (age 63); Modena, Emilia-Romagna, Italy

Formula One World Championship career
- Nationality: (Italy) Italian
- Active years: 1987–1992
- Team(s): Brabham, EuroBrun, Tyrrell, Jordan
- Entries: 81 (70 starts)
- Championships: 0
- Wins: 0
- Podiums: 2
- Career points: 17
- Pole positions: 0
- Fastest laps: 0
- First entry: 1987 Australian Grand Prix
- Last entry: 1992 Australian Grand Prix

Stefano Modena (born 12 May 1963) is an Italian former racing driver who competed in Formula One from 1987 to 1992.

Born and raised in Modena, Modena began his career in kart racing. After winning the junior World Cup in 1978, as well as back-to-back senior European Championships in 1983 and 1984, Modena progressed to Italian Formula Three in 1985. Following several race victories the next season—and taking pole position at the Macau Grand Prix—Modena moved to International Formula 3000 in 1987, winning the championship in his debut season.

Modena participated in 81 Formula One Grands Prix for Brabham, EuroBrun, Tyrrell, Jordan, debuting at the 1987 Australian Grand Prix. He achieved two podiums and 17 championship points across six seasons.

== Career ==
Modena was born on 12 May 1963 in Modena, Emilia-Romagna, Italy. A former 125cc Junior Karting Champion in Italy, he spent two seasons in the Italian Formula Ford national series before joining Euroracing in his domestic Formula 3 series in 1985, placing 15th in an Alfa Romeo engined Ralt. For 1986, he switched to Team Seresina's Reynard chassis and scored three wins to finish fourth overall, also placing second at the Monaco support race and winning a round of the European series at Imola. In 1987, he joined Onyx for the Formula 3000 series, winning three rounds and being crowned as champion.

Modena's raw speed saw many mark him as a future champion, resulting in Modena being offered a one-off drive for Brabham in the final race of the 1987 Formula One season. While he impressed by qualifying 15th at the 1987 Australian Grand Prix in Adelaide, his inexperience with the turbo charged BMW engine saw him stop three times to replace flat-spotted tyres before retiring with exhaustion before mid-distance. Modena was intent on becoming a full-time Grand Prix driver for 1988, testing for Benetton before the season. However, for a full-time drive he had to join the new EuroBrun team, who included many of the same Euroracing mechanics Modena had worked with in 1985. The EuroBrun ER188 with its 3.5 litre Ford Cosworth V8 engine was not competitive however, and Modena was consigned to run near the rear of the field for the year. He did however prove to be faster than his teammate, fellow F1 rookie and former Brun Motorsport sportscar driver, Argentina's Oscar Larrauri.

1989 saw Brabham reform after a sabbatical in 1988, now owned by Swiss businessman Joachim Luthi (who had bought the team from Walter Brun, the owner of EuroBrun), but featuring a lot of the same staff as in 1987. Modena was offered one of the seats, driving alongside Martin Brundle. Equipped with Pirelli qualifying tyres Modena frequently qualified well, starting inside the top-ten on eight occasions despite using the Judd V8 engine. However, the car was not reliable - though Modena's sole points finish would come with his third place at the Monaco Grand Prix, his first of two F1 podiums. Before the 1990 season Luthi would be imprisoned for fraud and Brabham endured a difficult year with ownership problems. Modena raised the team's spirits by finishing fifth at the season-opening United States Grand Prix but after that results were rare.

Modena finally got his big break in 1991 when he was signed as replacement for Ferrari-bound Tyrrell team leader Jean Alesi. With a healthy group of sponsors, 1990 spec Honda engines, Pirelli tyres and a development of the successful 020 chassis much was expected of the combination, with some predicting race wins. While his season started off with fourth place at Phoenix many of the front runners had retired without Modena getting near them. The wet conditions at Imola saw similar attrition allowing Modena to reach 3rd place before transmission failure. The following race at Monaco saw an even better performance as he qualified on the front row alongside his friend and World Champion Ayrton Senna, harrying the McLaren driver until being held up in traffic and suffering a violent engine failure. A steadier run in Canada was rewarded with second place after Nigel Mansell retired on the final lap. After that, Modena's form dropped off badly as Pirelli struggled to develop a consistent race tyre while the heavy Honda engines made the 020 chassis (originally designed for the Cosworth DFR V8) difficult to balance. While Modena continued to qualify frequently in the top half of the grid he struggled in races, only scoring one more point for sixth place at the Japanese Grand Prix.

The season was considered a huge disappointment, and Modena left Tyrrell for Jordan the following season. The team had made a strong debut in 1991 and many considered Modena was lucky to land a drive with them. However, their car was hindered by the underpowered Yamaha V12 engine and Modena struggled all season. He failed to qualify for four races and became unpopular with his team for his lack of mechanical sympathy and moody behaviour compared to teammate Maurício Gugelmin. This was confirmed by Gary Anderson, who had designed the 1992 car. Anderson said of Modena that the failures to qualify took his motivation away from him, and, due to his temper, he accumulated disappointments without being able to get over them. Despite scoring the team's only point of the year at the final round in Australia he was unable to find a drive in Grand Prix racing for 1993.

Modena drove instead for Alfa Romeo in the Italian and German touring categories from 1993 to 1999, winning occasional races but never looking like a serious contender for the title. After a year with Opel in 2000, he retired from motorsport.

After retiring, Modena participated to some twenty-four hours karting races and in 2003 he was hired by Bridgestone, to test first racing tires and then road tires. Over the years, he has conducted hundreds of tests in every geographical and climatic condition, including France, Spain, Sweden, the United Kingdom, Germany, Poland, Belgium and Japan. Always for the Asian company he dedicated himself to the promotion, marketing and development of new road tires, travelling to Turkey, Indonesia, Thailand, New Zealand, the United States and Dubai.

Since the late nineties, Modena has been living permanently in Rome with his wife and former actress Sveva Altieri, with whom he had two children: Ascanio, an archaeologist and journalist, and Vittoria, a jurisconsult.

Modena was known for being an eccentric character with bizarre habits verging on the obsessive, including not wanting to have his car parked on the left side of the team garage, and not allowing anyone to touch his race car once he was inside other than the team member who helped him with his safety belts. During his F1 career it was not unusual to see Modena get out of his car after being strapped and get back in before the warm-up lap if he had seen someone else touch the car. Modena was also known to race with his gloves inside out. However, as he has claimed, this was not due to superstition.

== Racing record ==
=== Career summary ===
| Season | Series | Team | Races | Wins | Poles | F/Laps | Podiums | Points | Position |
|---|---|---|---|---|---|---|---|---|---|
| 1985 | Italian Formula Three | Euroteam | 13 | 0 | 0 | 1 | 0 | 5 | 15th |
| 1986 | Italian Formula Three | Euroteam | 13 | 3 | 1 | 4 | 5 | 38 | 4th |
| 1986 | Macau Grand Prix | Euroteam | 1 | 0 | 1 | 0 | 0 | N/A | 13th |
| 1986 | European Formula 3 Cup | Euroteam | 1 | 1 | 0 | 0 | 1 | N/A | **1st** |
| 1987 | International Formula 3000 | Onyx Racing | 11 | 3 | 0 | 1 | 4 | 41 | **1st** |
| 1987 | Macau Grand Prix | Euroteam | 1 | 0 | 0 | 0 | 0 | N/A | 15th |
| 1987 | Formula One | Brabham | 1 | 0 | 0 | 0 | 0 | 0 | NC |
| 1988 | Formula One | EuroBrun Racing | 10 | 0 | 0 | 0 | 0 | 0 | NC |
| 1989 | Formula One | Motor Racing Developments | 15 | 0 | 0 | 0 | 1 | 4 | 16th |
| 1990 | Formula One | Motor Racing Developments | 16 | 0 | 0 | 0 | 0 | 2 | 16th |
| 1991 | Formula One | Braun Tyrrell Honda | 16 | 0 | 0 | 0 | 1 | 10 | 8th |
| 1992 | Formula One | Sasol Jordan Yamaha | 12 | 0 | 0 | 0 | 0 | 1 | 17th |
| 1993 | Italian Superturismo Championship | Euroteam | 20 | 0 | 0 | 0 | 0 | 46 | 11th |
| 1993 | FIA Touring Car Challenge | Euroteam | 2 | 0 | 0 | 0 | 0 | 14 | 13th |
| 1994 | Italian Superturismo Championship | Euroteam | 13 | 3 | 3 | 6 | 5 | 116 | 6th |
| 1994 | Deutsche Tourenwagen Meisterschaft | Alfa Corse | 6 | 1 | 1 | 2 | 2 | 74 | 12th |
| 1994 | FIA Touring Car World Cup | Alfa Corse | 1 | 0 | 0 | 0 | 0 | 0 | NC |
| 1995 | Deutsche Tourenwagen Meisterschaft | Euroteam | 11 | 0 | 0 | 1 | 1 | 26 | 16th |
| 1995 | International Touring Car Series | Euroteam | 10 | 0 | 0 | 2 | 1 | 49 | 7th |
| 1996 | International Touring Car Championship | JAS Motorsport Alfa Corse | 25 | 0 | 0 | 0 | 3 | 92 | 12th |
| 1997 | Super Tourenwagen Cup | JAS Engineering | 20 | 0 | 0 | 0 | 0 | 129 | 20th |
| 1998 | Super Tourenwagen Cup | Euroteam | 18 | 0 | 0 | 0 | 0 | 146 | 18th |
| 1998 | Italian Superturismo Championship | Nordauto Engineering | 2 | 0 | 0 | 1 | 1 | 32 | 15th |
| 1999 | Super Tourenwagen Cup | Euroteam | 19 | 0 | 0 | 0 | 0 | 271 | 13th |
| 2000 | Deutsche Tourenwagen Masters | Euroteam | 14 | 0 | 0 | 0 | 0 | 15 | 15th |

=== Complete International Formula 3000 results ===
(key) (Races in italics indicate fastest lap.)

| Year | Entrant | 1 | 2 | 3 | 4 | 5 | 6 | 7 | 8 | 9 | 10 | 11 | Pos. | Pts |
|---|---|---|---|---|---|---|---|---|---|---|---|---|---|---|
| 1987 | Onyx Racing | SIL; 4 | VAL; 1 | SPA; Ret | PAU; Ret | DON; 2 | PER; 6 | BRH; 4 | BIR; 1 | IMO; 1 | BUG; Ret | JAR; 6 | **1st** | **40** |

=== Complete Formula One results ===
(key)

| Year | Entrant | Chassis | Engine | 1 | 2 | 3 | 4 | 5 | 6 | 7 | 8 | 9 | 10 | 11 | 12 | 13 | 14 | 15 | 16 | WDC | Pts |
|---|---|---|---|---|---|---|---|---|---|---|---|---|---|---|---|---|---|---|---|---|---|
| 1987 | Brabham | Brabham BT56 | BMW Str-4 | BRA | SMR | BEL | MON | DET | FRA | GBR | GER | HUN | AUT | ITA | POR | ESP | MEX | JPN | AUS; Ret | NC | 0 |
| 1988 | EuroBrun Racing | EuroBrun ER188 | Cosworth V8 | BRA; Ret | SMR; NC | MON; EX | MEX; EX | CAN; 12 | DET; Ret | FRA; 14 | GBR; 12 | GER; Ret | HUN; 11 | BEL; DNQ | ITA; DNQ | POR; DNQ | ESP; 13 | JPN; DNQ | AUS; Ret | NC | 0 |
| 1989 | Motor Racing Developments | Brabham BT58 | Judd V8 | BRA; Ret | SMR; Ret | MON; 3 | MEX; 10 | USA; Ret | CAN; Ret | FRA; Ret | GBR; Ret | GER; Ret | HUN; 11 | BEL; Ret | ITA; EX | POR; 14 | ESP; Ret | JPN; Ret | AUS; 8 | 16th | 4 |
| 1990 | Motor Racing Developments | Brabham BT58 | Judd V8 | USA; 5 | BRA; Ret | | | | | | | | | | | | | | | 16th | 2 |
| 1990 | Motor Racing Developments | Brabham BT59 | Judd V8 | | | SMR; Ret | MON; Ret | CAN; 7 | MEX; 11 | FRA; 13 | GBR; 9 | GER; Ret | HUN; Ret | BEL; 17 | ITA; Ret | POR; Ret | ESP; Ret | JPN; Ret | AUS; 12 | 16th | 2 |
| 1991 | Braun Tyrrell Honda | Tyrrell 020 | Honda V10 | USA; 4 | BRA; Ret | SMR; Ret | MON; Ret | CAN; 2 | MEX; 11 | FRA; Ret | GBR; 7 | GER; 13 | HUN; 12 | BEL; Ret | ITA; Ret | POR; Ret | ESP; 16 | JPN; 6 | AUS; 10 | 8th | 10 |
| 1992 | Sasol Jordan Yamaha | Jordan 192 | Yamaha V12 | RSA; DNQ | MEX; Ret | BRA; Ret | ESP; DNQ | SMR; Ret | MON; Ret | CAN; Ret | FRA; Ret | GBR; Ret | GER; DNQ | HUN; Ret | BEL; 15 | ITA; DNQ | POR; 13 | JPN; 7 | AUS; 6 | 17th | 1 |

=== Complete Italian Superturismo Championship results ===
| Year | Team | Car | 1 | 2 | 3 | 4 | 5 | 6 | 7 | 8 | 9 | 10 | 11 | 12 | 13 | 14 | 15 | 16 | 17 | 18 | 19 | 20 | DC | Pts |
|---|---|---|---|---|---|---|---|---|---|---|---|---|---|---|---|---|---|---|---|---|---|---|---|---|
| 1993 | Euroteam | BMW 318i | MNZ; 1; 8 | MNZ; 2; 9 | VAL; 1 Ret | VAL; 2 Ret | MIS; 1; 8 | MIS; 2; 6 | MAG; 1; 15 | MAG; 2; 11 | BIN; 1; 6 | BIN; 2; 7 | IMO; 1; 8 | IMO; 2; 12 | VAR; 1; 8 | VAR; 2; 6 | MIS; 1; 9 | MIS; 2 Ret | PER; 1; 10 | PER; 2; 7 | MUG; 1; 14 | MUG; 2; 9 | 12th | 45 |
| 1994 | Euroteam | Alfa Romeo 155 TS | MNZ; 1; 15 | MNZ; 2; 4 | VAL; 1; 1 | VAL; 2; 7 | MAG; 1 Ret | MAG; 2 DNS | BIN; 1; 4 | BIN; 2; 16 | MIS; 1 Ret | MIS; 2 DNS | VAL; 1; 1 | VAL; 2; 2 | MUG; 1; 2 | MUG; 2; 1 | PER; 1 | PER; 2 | VAR; 1 | VAR; 2 | MUG; 1 Ret | MUG; 2; 7 | 6th | 116 |

=== Complete Deutsche Tourenwagen Meisterschaft/Masters results ===
(key) (Races in bold indicate pole position) (Races in italics indicate fastest lap)

| Year | Team | Car | 1 | 2 | 3 | 4 | 5 | 6 | 7 | 8 | 9 | 10 | 11 | 12 | 13 | 14 | 15 | 16 | 17 | 18 | 19 | 20 | 21 | 22 | 23 | 24 | Pos. | Pts |
|---|---|---|---|---|---|---|---|---|---|---|---|---|---|---|---|---|---|---|---|---|---|---|---|---|---|---|---|---|
| 1994 | Alfa Corse | Alfa Romeo 155 V6 Ti | ZOL; 1 | ZOL; 2 | HOC; 1 | HOC; 2 | NÜR; 1 | NÜR; 2 | MUG; 1 | MUG; 2 | NÜR; 1 | NÜR; 2 | NOR; 1 | NOR; 2 | DON; 1 | DON; 2 | DIE; 1 | DIE; 2 | NÜR; 1 | NÜR; 2 | AVU; 1; 1 | **AVU**; **2**; 1 | **ALE**; **1**; 2 | ALE; 2; 2 | HOC; 1 Ret | HOC; 2; 7 | 12th | 74 |
| 1995 | Euroteam | Alfa Romeo 155 V6 Ti | HOC; 1 Ret | HOC; 2 DNS | AVU; 1; 5 | AVU; 2; 2 | NOR; 1; 5 | NOR; 2; 4 | DIE; 1; 12 | DIE; 2 Ret | NÜR; 1 Ret | NÜR; 2 DNS | ALE; 1 Ret | ALE; 2 DNS | HOC; 1; 14 | HOC; 2 Ret | | | | | | | | | | | 16th | 26 |
| 2000 | Euroteam | Opel Astra V8 Coupé DTM 2000 | HOC; 1; 13 | HOC; 2; 10 | OSC; 1; 12 | OSC; 2 Ret | NOR; 1; 10 | NOR; 2; 10 | SAC; 1; 14 | SAC; 2 Ret | NÜR; 1; 19 | NÜR; 2; 15 | LAU; 1 C | LAU; 2 C | OSC; 1 Ret | OSC; 2 DNS | NÜR; 1 Ret | NÜR; 2 DNS | HOC; 1; 9 | HOC; 2; 4 | | | | | | | 15th | 15 |

=== Complete International Touring Car Championship results ===
(key) (Races in bold indicate pole position) (Races in italics indicate fastest lap)

| Year | Team | Car | 1 | 2 | 3 | 4 | 5 | 6 | 7 | 8 | 9 | 10 | 11 | 12 | 13 | 14 | 15 | 16 | 17 | 18 | 19 | 20 | 21 | 22 | 23 | 24 | 25 | 26 | Pos. | Pts |
|---|---|---|---|---|---|---|---|---|---|---|---|---|---|---|---|---|---|---|---|---|---|---|---|---|---|---|---|---|---|---|
| 1995 | Euroteam | Alfa Romeo 155 V6 Ti | MUG; 1; 6 | MUG; 2; 11 | HEL; 1; 2 | HEL; 2 Ret | DON; 1; 6 | DON; 2; 13 | EST; 1; 20 | EST; 2; 5 | MAG; 1; 5 | MAG; 2; 6 | | | | | | | | | | | | | | | | | 7th | 49 |
| 1996 | JAS Motorsport Alfa Romeo | Alfa Romeo 155 V6 TI | HOC; 1 Ret | HOC; 2 DNS | NÜR; 1; 17 | NÜR; 2 Ret | EST; 1 DNS | EST; 2; 9 | HEL; 1; 7 | HEL; 2 Ret | NOR; 1; 3 | NOR; 2; 13 | DIE; 1; 4 | DIE; 2; 3 | SIL; 1; 4 | SIL; 2 Ret | NÜR; 1; 13 | NÜR; 2; 10 | MAG; 1; 13 | MAG; 2; 7 | MUG; 1 Ret | MUG; 2; 14 | HOC; 1 Ret | HOC; 2; 10 | INT; 1; 2 | INT; 2; 8 | SUZ; 1; 5 | SUZ; 2; 4 | 12th | 92 |

=== Complete Super Tourenwagen Cup results ===
(key) (Races in bold indicate pole position) (Races in italics indicate fastest lap)

| Year | Team | Car | 1 | 2 | 3 | 4 | 5 | 6 | 7 | 8 | 9 | 10 | 11 | 12 | 13 | 14 | 15 | 16 | 17 | 18 | 19 | 20 | DC | Pts |
|---|---|---|---|---|---|---|---|---|---|---|---|---|---|---|---|---|---|---|---|---|---|---|---|---|
| 1997 | JAS Engineering | Alfa Romeo 155 TS | HOC; 1; 10 | HOC; 2; 17 | ZOL; 1; 14 | ZOL; 2; 27 | NÜR; 1; 23 | NÜR; 2; 20 | SAC; 1; 23 | SAC; 2 Ret | NOR; 1; 27 | NOR; 2; 7 | WUN; 1; 14 | WUN; 2 Ret | ZWE; 1; 18 | ZWE; 2; 20 | SAL; 1; 19 | SAL; 2; 17 | REG; 1; 16 | REG; 2; 10 | NÜR; 1 DNS | NÜR; 2 Ret | 20th | 129 |
| 1998 | Euroteam S.R.L. | Alfa Romeo 156 | HOC; 1; 18 | HOC; 2; 18 | NÜR; 1; 15 | NÜR; 2; 12 | SAC; 1; 10 | SAC; 2; 17 | NOR; 1 Ret | NOR; 2 DNS | REG; 1; 14 | REG; 2 Ret | WUN; 1 Ret | WUN; 2; 9 | ZWE; 1; 10 | ZWE; 2; 10 | SAL; 1; 16 | SAL; 2 Ret | OSC; 1; 18 | OSC; 2; 15 | NÜR; 1; 22 | NÜR; 2; 17 | 18th | 146 |
| 1999 | Euroteam | Alfa Romeo 156 | SAC; 1; 7 | SAC; 2; 11 | ZWE; 1; 9 | ZWE; 2; 10 | OSC; 1; 10 | OSC; 2 Ret | NOR; 1; 12 | NOR; 2; 13 | MIS; 1; 6 | MIS; 2 Ret | NÜR; 1; 4 | NÜR; 2; 4 | SAL; 1; 7 | SAL; 2; 4 | OSC; 1 Ret | OSC; 2 DNS | HOC; 1; 7 | HOC; 2 Ret | NÜR; 1; 10 | NÜR; 2; 7 | 13th | 271 |

Sporting positions
| Preceded by Alex Caffi | FIA European Formula Three Cup winner 1986 | Succeeded by Steve Kempton |
| Preceded by Ivan Capelli | International Formula 3000 champion 1987 | Succeeded by Roberto Moreno |
