= Brabham BT55 =

Formula One racing car

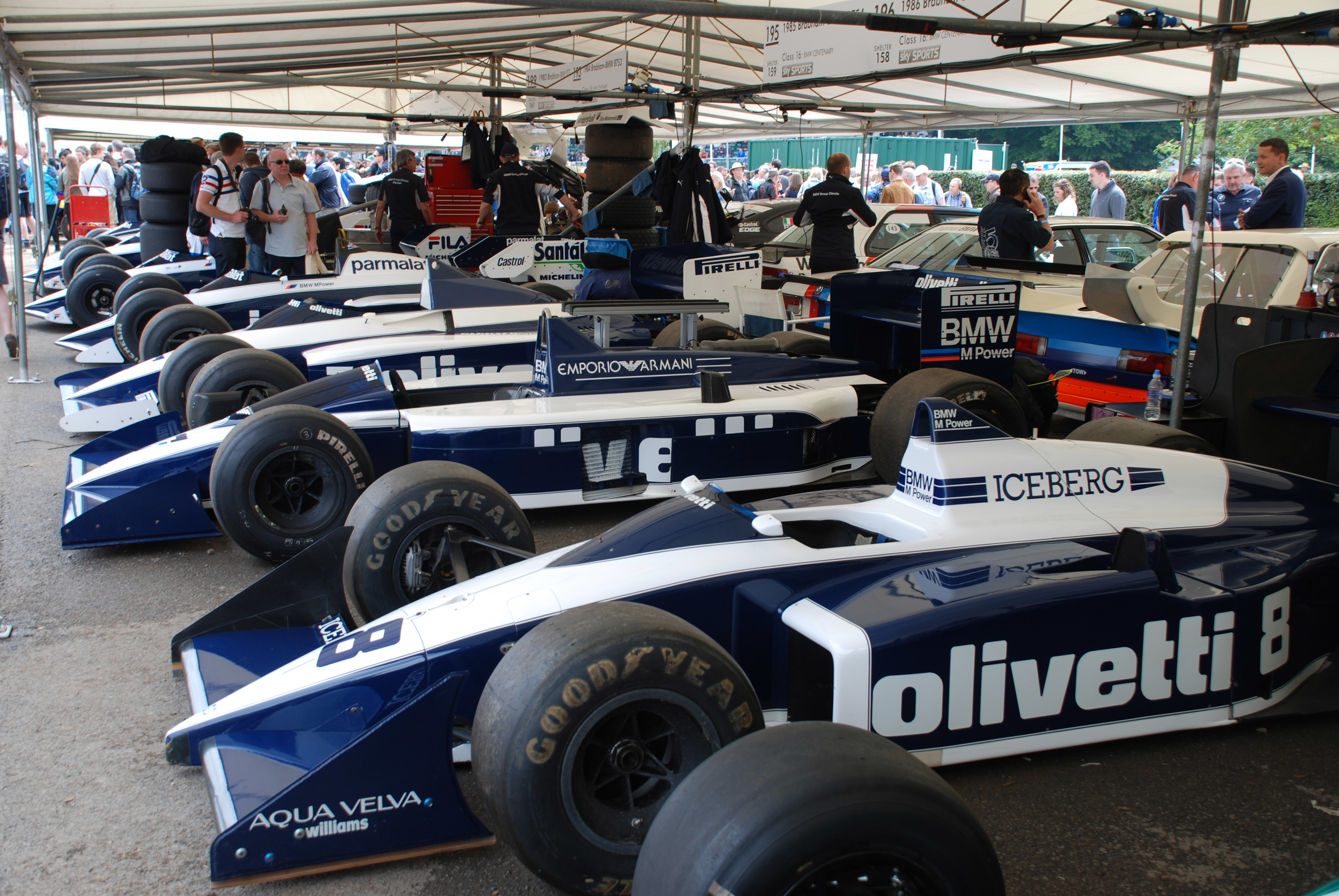
- Brabham BT55 (second car from the viewer) on display at the 2016 Goodwood Festival of Speed
- Category: Formula One
- Constructor: Brabham
- Designers: Gordon Murray (Technical Director); David North (Chief Designer); Paul Rosche (Chief Engine Designer (BMW))
- Predecessor: BT54
- Successor: BT56

Technical specifications
- Chassis: Carbon fibre and Kevlar composite monocoque
- Suspension (front): Pullrods, Double wishbones
- Suspension (rear): Pushrods, Double wishbones
- Axle track: Front: 1,778 mm (70.0 in); Rear: 1,675 mm (65.9 in)
- Wheelbase: 3,408 mm (134.2 in)
- Engine: BMW M12/13, 1,499 cc (91.5 cu in), Straight 4, turbo, mid-engine, longitudinally mounted
- Transmission: Weismann Laydown Transverse 7 Speed manual
- Weight: 555 kg (1,224 lb)
- Fuel: Castrol
- Tyres: Pirelli

Competition history
- Notable entrants: Motor Racing Developments Ltd.
- Notable drivers: 7. (Italy) Riccardo Patrese; 8. (Italy) Elio de Angelis; 8. (United Kingdom) Derek Warwick
- Debut: 1986 Brazilian Grand Prix
Races	Wins	Poles	F/Laps
16	0	0	0
- Constructors' Championships: 0
- Drivers' Championships: 0

The Brabham BT55 was a Formula One racing car designed by Gordon Murray and David North for the Brabham team owned by Bernie Ecclestone. It used a BMW four-cylinder turbocharged engine tilted over on its side to allow a clear supply of air to the rear wing. The car competed during the 1986 Formula One season. It was not successful and its introduction coincided with the end of Brabham's time as a competitive team.

== Concept ==
By 1985, Brabham had reached the limit of aerodynamic development of their BT52-BT53-BT54 series of cars. The 1985 car won only one race when Nelson Piquet won in France, and Murray decided that a radical approach was needed. With ground effect having been banned a few years earlier, the rear wing of a Formula One car once again created much of its downforce, but its effectiveness is reduced by the bodywork in front of it disturbing the flow of air. Brabham's tall, relatively heavy straight-four BMW M12 engine was particularly difficult to package to allow a good flow of air to the rear wing. Designers in the 1950s had addressed the same problem of reducing the car's cross sectional area by tilting the engines around a vertical or longitudinal axis by a small amount. Examples include the 1950s Kurtis-Kraft, George Salih and Quin Epperly's Championship Cars, and Colin Chapman's Formula One Lotus 16.

Both the Brabham team and their gearbox supplier Weismann lay claim to the idea of doing this with the tall BMW engine in order to create a car with very low bodywork that would allow a large supply of air to reach the rear wing undisturbed and create more downforce without harming the straight line potential with high drag. The driver was placed in a lying down position (approximately 30° according to Murray), as had been common in the 1960s, but had become rare by the 1980s. BMW designed a special version of their four-cylinder turbocharged engine with the engine block tilted almost horizontally (18° from horizontal).

== Chassis and suspension ==
The car was also Brabham's first fully composite monocoque. Although the team had been the first in Formula One to make use of carbon fibre composite panels in the structure of the car in 1978, Murray had been reluctant to design a fully composite car until he understood how it would perform in a crash: he eventually persuaded Ecclestone to finance a fully instrumented crash test of a BT49 chassis. He was not happy to employ a two-piece composite chassis, preferring to develop a technique which produced a seamless monocoque of carbon fibre/kevlar composite over a nomex honeycomb. This structure was reinforced, like his earlier designs, by machined aluminium bulkheads.

== Engine and transmission ==
At Murray's request, BMW designed a special version of their M12 inline four engine. Differences from the standard upright unit were few, mainly concerning the oil scavenging system and the cradle in which the unit was mounted. Like the upright version the unit was not a stressed component. Mounting the engine on its side meant that the power takeoff from the unit, previously at the bottom, was offset to one side. A special 7-speed 3-shaft gearbox from American gearbox specialists Weismann was produced to deal with this.

== Racing history ==
At the end of 1985, Piquet left Brabham after seven seasons and two world championships, joining Williams which made him a much better salary offer and offered more competitive equipament. Marc Surer also left the team. Riccardo Patrese returned to Brabham, and was joined by Elio de Angelis.

The aerodynamic concept worked, in that the car produced plenty of downforce without increasing drag which allowed the cars to run less wing and be among the fastest in a straight line at the faster tracks like Hockenheim, Monza (where Warwick recorded the car's ultimate top speed of 347 km/h (216 mph)) and the Österreichring (where Warwick was actually the quickest through the speed trap at 344 km/h (214 mph) heading into the Bosch Kurve). However, the tilted over engine and specially designed gearbox also produced many reliability problems including oil surge and a lack of throttle response that only compounded the already poor response of the BMW turbo (four cylinder turbos generally suffered more 'turbo lag' as a result of only using a single turbocharger, while V6 and V8 engines used twin turbos and suffered less lag). This saw the Brabhams off the pace on the slower circuits such as Monaco (where de Angelis qualified 20th and last for his final race, though amazingly Patrese managed to qualify 6th), Detroit, and the then new circuits of Jerez and the Hungaroring where acceleration counted for more than outright speed. The team scored just two points all season, both by driver Riccardo Patrese with sixth placings in San Marino and Detroit. As in 1985, the Brabham's performance was severely hampered by inconsistent Pirelli race tyres.

While the car's problems were primarily engine and gearbox related, most of the media and those in the F1 paddock labeled the car as a 'lemon', choosing instead to claim that the lowline concept simply did not work.

Qualifying at Imola during Round 2 of the season highlighted both the advantage and problems that the lowline Brabham BT55 had during 1986. Acceleration out of the Variante Bassa chicane before the start-finish line showed the Brabhams as among the slowest cars when they crossed the line. However, by the time they reached the speed trap just before the braking area at Tosa, they were among the quickest. The cars were slow out of the corners, but once they got up to speed the lowline aerodynamics and the 1,350 bhp (1,007 kW; 1,369 PS) BMW turbo did their job and with the reduced drag, from the high speed Tamburello curve both Patrese and de Angelis accelerated quicker than any other cars. However, the Brabhams were almost 4 seconds off pole with Patrese qualifying 16th and de Angelis 19th. The Brabham-BMWs were in fact slower than both the Benettons and Arrows which used the conventional upright BMW engine.

Italian driver Elio de Angelis who had joined Brabham after six years with Lotus, was the first driver to die in a works Brabham when he was killed in an accident while testing at the Circuit Paul Ricard in France. The car survived the accident relatively intact and de Angelis had only minor injuries. However, there were very few track marshals at the circuit and he was trapped in the car and suffered oxygen deprivation due to a fire before they arrived, prompting a review of testing safety, with changes including more marshals as well as medical staff and a required medical evacuation helicopter. De Angelis died from smoke inhalation 29 hours after the crash at the hospital in Marseille where he had been taken. In the Belgian Grand Prix following the death of de Angelis, Brabham only entered one car for Patrese. From the next race in Canada, British driver Derek Warwick joined the team. According to team boss Bernie Ecclestone, Warwick, a former factory Renault driver who had been driving for the TWR Jaguar World Sportscar Championship team in 1986 after having missed out on a seat at Lotus, was reportedly the only top level driver without a current F1 drive who did not contact him in the days following de Angelis' death to ask about the drive.

During qualifying for the Italian Grand Prix, Warwick and Patrese were the 3rd and 4th fastest cars through the speed trap on Monza's long front straight (behind the similarly BMW powered Benettons of Gerhard Berger and Teo Fabi). Warwick's top speed of 347 km/h (216 mph) (the BT55's fastest ever recorded speed), only 5 km/h (3 mph) slower than Berger, again showed that while the car suffered from sluggish acceleration, the lowline concept worked as it created downforce but did not increase drag and hinder top speed.

== Aftermath ==
Murray has since summarised the reasons for the car's failure: "...I was much too ambitious in how much we lowered it. The rather tall BMW [engine] had to lie down so far it produced a heavily offset crank needing a special gearbox and drivetrain, and what I did wrong was to try to do it in the time available.

"Secondly, the engine never worked properly in the lay down position. The exhaust and turbo system was a nightmare and it had incurable oil surge and drain problems in corners. One way it was OK, but not the other.

"The weight distribution gave dynamic centre of gravity movements that messed up the traction.

"And then Bernie [Ecclestone, owner of the team] who is totally non-technical and had always left that side completely to me, started to get involved on the technical side. We had had 16 years with never a cross word until then, and things were changing with his deeper and deeper involvement in [the Formula One Constructors Association]. Then McLaren made approaches to me and I just felt it was the end of the road at Brabham."

Murray also stated in an interview towards the end of the 1986 season that despite the BT55's bad performance, he still believed in the lowline concept pointing out that the car's problems were related uniquely due to engine and mechanics. He said that the car would have worked better had the BMW been a more compact V6 rather than a straight-4.

Murray left the team at the end of the year to join rivals McLaren where he replaced John Barnard as the team's Technical Director. The very successful 1988 McLaren MP4/4 is usually said to have been based on the BT55 concept, but that has been disputed, and that it was primarily a development of its predecessor, the Steve Nichols designed MP4/3.

Brabham regrouped with the much more conventional BT56, but had to re-use the tilted over BMW engine and a new, 5" shorter, Weismann 6 speed gearbox as the German manufacturer, already reducing its involvement in Formula One, had sold the supply of conventional engines to Megatron for use by Arrows, and later Ligier. BMW pulled out of Formula One altogether at the end of 1987. Bernie Ecclestone sold the Brabham team to Alfa Romeo and the team missed the 1988 season.

== Complete Formula One results ==
(key)

Year	Entrant	Engine	Tyres	Driver	1	2	3	4	5	6	7	8	9	10	11	12	13	14	15	16	WCC	Pts.
1986	Motor Racing Developments	BMW M12/13; S4 tc	P		BRA	ESP	SMR	MON	BEL	CAN	DET	FRA	GBR	GER	HUN	AUT	ITA	POR	MEX	AUS	9th	2
1986	Motor Racing Developments	BMW M12/13; S4 tc	P	Riccardo Patrese	Ret	Ret	6	Ret	8	Ret	6	7		Ret	Ret	Ret	Ret	Ret	13	Ret	9th	2
1986	Motor Racing Developments	BMW M12/13; S4 tc	P	Elio de Angelis	8	Ret	Ret	Ret													9th	2
1986	Motor Racing Developments	BMW M12/13; S4 tc	P	Derek Warwick						Ret	10	9	8	7	Ret	DNS	Ret	Ret	Ret	Ret	9th	2
