= Gregor Foitek =

Swiss racing driver (born 1965)

- Born: 27 March 1965 (age 61); Zürich, Switzerland

Formula One World Championship career
- Nationality: (Switzerland) Swiss
- Active years: 1989–1990
- Team(s): EuroBrun, Rial, Brabham, Onyx
- Entries: 22 (7 starts)
- Championships: 0
- Wins: 0
- Podiums: 0
- Career points: 0
- Pole positions: 0
- Fastest laps: 0
- First entry: 1989 Brazilian Grand Prix
- Last entry: 1990 Hungarian Grand Prix

Gregor Foitek (German pronunciation: [ˈɡʁeːɡoːɐ̯ ˈfo.iːtɛk]; born 27 March 1965) is a Swiss former racing driver. He won the 1986 Swiss Formula 3 Championship. Foitek participated in 22 Formula One Grands Prix, debuting on 26 March 1989. He scored no championship points. He later made two CART starts for Foyt Enterprises in 1992 but was knocked out of both races by mechanical issues.

Foitek helps run Foitek Automobile, a family-run Ferrari and Maserati dealership in Altendorf.

== Formula One career ==
=== 1989: EuroBrun and Rial ===
Foitek made his debut at the 1989 Brazilian Grand Prix, however with turbos now banned from F1, the number of entries had grown to 39. Thirteen cars had to enter pre-qualifying and with EuroBrun having performed poorly in 1988, Foitek had to enter the session using the ER188B, which was an update of the 1988 car. Foitek only got to the main qualifying session once, at the first race in Brazil, where he then failed to qualify. After 11 rounds, Foitek quit the EuroBrun team.

At the Spanish Grand Prix, Foitek was called up to replace Christian Danner at the Rial team. However, the Rial team were having a bad season and several crew members had left the team. Furthermore, although it was assured of a place in the main qualifying session, the Rial ARC2 was uncompetitive, some five seconds off the next slowest car. In his one race with the team, Foitek's rear wing broke at high speed and he crashed heavily. He immediately quit the team.

=== 1990: Brabham and Onyx ===
Foitek started the 1990 season with Brabham, filling in for the first two races whilst David Brabham prepared himself to move up to F1. He qualified for both races, making his first F1 start in Phoenix, but didn't finish either race.

Once Brabham moved up to take his F1 seat, Foitek moved across to Onyx (now part-run by his father Karl) to replace Stefan Johansson, who had left the team having been unhappy at the way the team was run. Foitek qualified for his first four races with Onyx and was classified seventh at Monaco (although he was running sixth late on but retired after a collision with Eric Bernard when being overtaken). The lack of resources began to tell for Onyx as the season wore on, with Foitek only qualifying once in the following four races - as did his teammate, JJ Lehto, at Hockenheim where they shared the back row of the grid - before Onyx folded after the Hungarian Grand Prix.

== Racing record ==
=== Complete International Formula 3000 results ===
(key) (Races in bold indicate pole position; races in italics indicate fastest lap.)

Year	Entrant	Chassis	Engine	1	2	3	4	5	6	7	8	9	10	11	Pos.	Pts
1986	Horag Racing	Lola T86/50	Cosworth	SIL	VAL	PAU	SPA	IMO	MUG	PER	ÖST	BIR	BUG	JAR; Ret	NC	0
1987	Genoa Racing	March 87B	Cosworth	SIL; Ret	VAL; 15	SPA; 10	PAU; Ret	DON; DNQ	PER; DNQ	BRH; DNQ	BIR; Ret				NC	0
1987	GA Motorsport	Lola T87/50	Cosworth									IMO; 12	BUG; 8	JAR; 14†	NC	0
1988	GA Motorsport	Lola T88/50	Cosworth	JER; Ret	**VAL**; 1	PAU; DNQ	SIL; 4	MNZ; 4	PER; Ret	BRH; Ret	BIR	BUG; Ret	ZOL; Ret	DIJ; Ret	7th	15

=== Complete Formula One World Championship results ===
(key)

Year	Entrant	Chassis	Engine	1	2	3	4	5	6	7	8	9	10	11	12	13	14	15	16	WDC	Points
1989	EuroBrun Racing	EuroBrun ER188B	Judd V8	BRA; DNQ	SMR; DNPQ	MON; DNPQ	MEX; DNPQ	USA; DNPQ	CAN; DNPQ	FRA; DNPQ	GBR; DNPQ			BEL; DNPQ	ITA	POR				NC	0
1989	EuroBrun Racing	EuroBrun ER189	Judd V8									GER; DNPQ	HUN; DNPQ							NC	0
1989	Rial Racing	Rial ARC2	Cosworth V8														ESP; DNQ	JPN	AUS	NC	0
1990	Motor Racing Developments	Brabham BT58	Judd V8	USA; Ret	BRA; Ret															NC	0
1990	Moneytron Onyx	Onyx ORE-1	Cosworth V8			SMR; Ret	MON; 7†	CAN; Ret	MEX; 15	FRA; DNQ										NC	0
1990	Monteverdi Onyx Formula One	Onyx ORE-1	Cosworth V8								GBR; DNQ	GER; Ret	HUN; DNQ	BEL	ITA	POR	ESP	JPN	AUS	NC	0

† Driver did not finish the race, but was still classified as they completed 90% of the race distance.

=== Complete CART results ===
Year	Team	No.	1	2	3	4	5	6	7	8	9	10	11	12	13	14	15	16	Rank	Points	Ref
1992	A. J. Foyt Enterprises	14	SRF; 21	PNX	LBH; 18	INDY	DET	POR	MIL	NHM	TOR	MIS	CLE	ROA	VAN	MDO	NAZ	LS	47th	0	

Sporting positions
Preceded by Jakob Bordoli	Swiss Formula Three; Champion; 1986	Succeeded by Jacques Isler
