= Brabham BT58 =

Formula One racing car

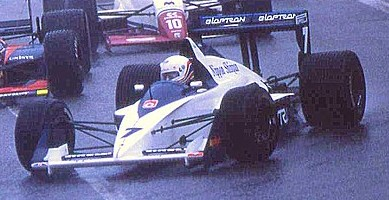
- Martin Brundle driving the BT58 at the Belgian Grand Prix
- Category: Formula One
- Constructor: Brabham
- Designers: John Baldwin (Technical Director); Sergio Rinland (Chief Designer)
- Predecessor: BT56
- Successor: BT59

Technical specifications
- Chassis: Carbon fibre and Kevlar monocoque
- Axle track: Front: 1,803 mm (71.0 in); Rear: 1,676 mm (66.0 in)
- Wheelbase: 2,794 mm (110.0 in)
- Engine: Judd EV, 3,496 cc (213.3 cu in), 76° V8, NA, mid-engine, longitudinally mounted
- Transmission: Brabham / Hewland 6-speed manual
- Fuel: Elf
- Tyres: Pirelli

Competition history
- Notable entrants: Motor Racing Developments
- Notable drivers: 7. (United Kingdom) Martin Brundle; 7. (Switzerland) Gregor Foitek; 8. (Italy) Stefano Modena
- Debut: 1989 Brazilian Grand Prix
Races	Wins	Poles	F/Laps
18	0	0	0
- Constructors' Championships: 0
- Drivers' Championships: 0

The Brabham BT58 was a Formula One racing car designed by John Baldwin and Sergio Rinland for the Brabham team which raced in the 1989 season. The teams cars were driven by Italian Stefano Modena and the 1988 World Sportscar Champion, the returning Martin Brundle. It made its debut at the 1989 Brazilian Grand Prix and continued until the first two races of 1990. The best result achieved was a third place at the 1989 Monaco Grand Prix driven by Modena. The car was powered by the Judd V8 engine and ran on Pirelli tyres.

== 1989 ==
After missing the entire 1988 season, the first time since 1961 that the Brabham name wasn't on the F1 grid as a constructor, the team was forced into pre-qualifying for 1989, largely thanks to the increased entry to Formula One that year in light of the new regulations that banned the powerful, but expensive, turbocharged engines (Brabham actually had the first ever turbocharged World Champion in Nelson Piquet in 1983).

Brabham, making a welcome return to the F1 paddock, proved competitive with the Judd powered BT58, with Modena never failing to pre-qualify, while car problems saw Brundle only failing to do so twice in Canada and France, both of which saw Brundle claim during practice for the British Grand Prix at Silverstone that he had been "Driving like an old woman". Both Brundle and Modena proved very competitive at the Monaco Grand Prix, running behind the all-conquering McLaren-Honda cars of Ayrton Senna and Alain Prost. Brundle was running a fine third late in the race when he was forced to pit to replace a dead battery, ultimately finishing sixth (unlike most other cars in the field, the BT58 had its battery under the driver's seat and not behind the driver's head, meaning Brundle had to vacate the car in the pits for the team to replace it). It was Modena who benefited from Brundle's misfortune as he would finish third behind the McLarens. The points scored at Monaco meant that the team 'graduated' from pre-qualifying for the second half of the season.

Modena's third place at Monaco was Brabham's 120th and final podium finish for the team started by Australian World Champion Jack Brabham in 1962.

Part of the BT58's initial advantage was its Pirelli qualifying tyres, although like other teams using the Italian rubber, the race tyres were not of the same quality. However, during the last half of the season as Formula One moved to faster circuits such as Silverstone, Hockenheim and Monza, the BT58's lack of straight line speed from the 600 bhp (447 kW; 608 PS) Judd V8, and Pirelli's less than competitive race tyres, saw that results were harder to come by, though Brundle did defy the odds by finishing sixth at Monza after Modena was excluded during qualifying when his car weighed in under the legal limit. After scoring 5 points in Monaco, the team would only score another 3 for the rest of the season, with Brundle finishing sixth in the Italian Grand Prix, and fifth in Japan.

== 1990 ==
The BT58 was used for the first two races of the 1990 season, with Modena finishing 5th in the season's opening race in Phoenix. The BT58 was replaced by the Brabham BT59 from the third race of the year in San Marino.

== Complete Formula One results ==
(key)

Year	Entrant	Engine	Tyres	Drivers	1	2	3	4	5	6	7	8	9	10	11	12	13	14	15	16	Pts.	WCC
1989	Motor Racing Developments	Judd; EV 3.5 V8	P		BRA	SMR	MON	MEX	USA	CAN	FRA	GBR	GER	HUN	BEL	ITA	POR	ESP	JPN	AUS	8	9th
1989	Motor Racing Developments	Judd; EV 3.5 V8	P	Martin Brundle	Ret	Ret	6	9	Ret	DNPQ	DNPQ	Ret	8	12	Ret	6	8	Ret	5	Ret	8	9th
1989	Motor Racing Developments	Judd; EV 3.5 V8	P	Stefano Modena	Ret	Ret	3	10	Ret	Ret	Ret	Ret	Ret	11	Ret	EX	14	Ret	Ret	8	8	9th
1990	Motor Racing Developments	Judd; EV 3.5 V8	P		USA	BRA	SMR	MON	CAN	MEX	FRA	GBR	GER	HUN	BEL	ITA	POR	ESP	JPN	AUS	2	9th
1990	Motor Racing Developments	Judd; EV 3.5 V8	P	Gregor Foitek	Ret	Ret															2	9th
1990	Motor Racing Developments	Judd; EV 3.5 V8	P	Stefano Modena	5	Ret															2	9th
