= John Judd =

British motorsport engineer

- Born: April 9, 1942 (age 83); Coventry, Warwickshire
- Occupations: Formula One Engineer; Owner of Engine Developments Ltd

John David Judd (born 9 April 1942) is a Formula One engineer from England. He is co-founder with Jack Brabham of Engine Developments Ltd., known for designing and developing Formula One engines. He worked closely with Jack Brabham in the 1960s, contributed to championship-winning engines, and later supplied engines to several F1 teams. His company also competed in IndyCar, touring cars, and Le Mans racing. Engine Developments Ltd. are manufacturers of Judd engines.

== Formula 1 work with Brabham ==
Judd began his career at a young age, shortly after he decided to leave school. He managed to get signed as an employee for the engine company Coventry Climax, his first job. They gave him a scholarship to study at a local college. In the early 1960s he began working on the Coventry Climax Formula 1 engine, which was used at the time by Jack Brabham. After Brabham separated with Coventry to move to Repco, Judd was hired by Brabham to work with engine designer Phil Irving. He was to design and build the new 3-litre engines for Brabham, the result being two drivers championships and two constructors championships in 1966 and 1967.

Later, Brabham switched again to Ford DFV engines built by Cosworth, and once again, Judd was hired by Jack Brabham to do developmental work on the Cosworth DFV engines. The Brabham team later sold to Bernie Ecclestone, and Jack Brabham planned to create a new project in engine development. He and Judd founded Engine Developments Ltd. in 1971. In the years that followed Engine Developments prepared Cosworth engines for teams such as Williams, Arrows, Lotus, Ensign and Fittipaldi.

== Independent company ==
In the late 1970s, Judd and his team extended to IndyCar. In 1980, Judd was hired by Honda to develop an engine for the company's return to Formula Two in association with Ron Tauranac's Ralt team.

== Return to Formula 1 ==
Judd and his company came back to F1 in the 1988 season supplying engines for Williams, Ligier and March. In 1991 Judd struck a deal with Scuderia Italia to supply V10 engines for a Dallara-designed car.

In 1992 Judd created a partnership with Yamaha to build and develop engines for Formula 1. The best result of this collaboration came in the 1997 Hungarian GP when Damon Hill finished second behind Jacques Villeneuve. The partnership ended at the start of the 1998 season. Judd continued to develop his V10 engine in 1998 and 1999.

== Le Mans ==
Beginning the 21st century, Judd and his company moved to touring cars and the Le Mans Series, resulting in victory in the 2001 American Le Mans Series with Dick Barbour Racing, and second place in the teams championship in the Rolex Sports Car Series in 2002 with Doran.

In 2004, Judd's collaboration with Ray Mallock Ltd. earned the XV675 one of its few successes, winning the LMP2 class at the 2005 24 Hours of Le Mans. In 2007 Judd planned to supply the LMP2 team with his engine.
