= Judd (engine) =

British company

Engine Developments Limited
- Type: Private limited company
- Founded: 1971
- Founder: John Judd; Jack Brabham
- Headquarters: Rugby, Warwickshire, United Kingdom
- Products: High performance racing engines
- Website: www.juddpower.com

Judd is a brand of racing car engines built by Engine Developments Ltd., a company founded in 1971 by John Judd and Jack Brabham in Rugby, Warwickshire, England. Engine Developments was intended to build engines for Brabham's racing efforts, and became one of the first firms authorised by Cosworth to maintain and rebuild its DFV engines, but has since expanded into various areas of motorsport.

Judd has provided engines for many major series, including Formula One, Indycar and other smaller formula series, sports car racing, and touring car racing. They have been associated with manufacturers such as Yamaha, MG, Mazda and Honda, although they have mainly been a privateer-engine supplier.

== Lower formulae and IndyCar ==
Judd AV

Overview
- Manufacturer: (United Kingdom) Judd
- Production: 1984–1990

Layout
- Configuration: 90° V8
- Displacement: 2.6 L (2,643 cc)
- Cylinder bore: 92 mm (3.6 in)
- Piston stroke: 49.7 mm (2.0 in)
- Valvetrain: 32-valve, DOHC, four-valves per cylinder
- Compression ratio: 11:1

Combustion
- Fuel system: Electronic fuel injection
- Fuel type: Gasoline
- Oil system: Dry sump

Output
- Power output: 740–850 hp (552–634 kW)
- Torque output: 350–470 lb⋅ft (475–637 N⋅m)

As a result of Jack Brabham's long-standing relationship with Honda, Judd was hired by them to develop an engine for the company's return to Formula Two in association with Ron Tauranac's Ralt team.

After the demise of Formula Two at the end of the 1984 season, Judd continued to develop new engines for Honda. The first was the Judd AV, a turbocharged V8 engine built for Honda's CART campaign. It was first used on the CART circuit midway through the 1986 season, fielded by Galles Racing and driver Geoff Brabham. It was initially badged as the Brabham-Honda, and scored a fourth-place finish at the 1986 Michigan 500. In 1987, the engine was used for the first time at the Indianapolis 500. Rookie Jeff MacPherson finished 8th in the engine's first Indy appearance. Brabham scored second-place finishes in 1987 at Pocono and Road America, as well as a third at the season finale at Miami.

The engine became known for its reliability and superior fuel mileage (particularly in the 500-mile races). However, it was at a decided power disadvantage compared to the top engine of the time, the Ilmor-Chevrolet.

In 1988, Truesports with driver Bobby Rahal took over as the primary team, and the "Honda" name and support was dropped from the powerplant. During the 1988 season, Rahal took advantage of the engine's reliability in the 500-mile races, finishing fifth at Indianapolis and second at the Michigan 500. He then scored the first and only Indy car victory for the Judd engine, at the 1988 Pocono 500. Rahal's ten top-10 finishes led to a third-place in the season points standings. A year later, Raul Boesel drove a Judd to a 3rd place in the 1989 Indianapolis 500, which would be Judd's best Indy 500 result. In that race, all five Judds that qualified were running at the finish, with two in the top ten.

Judd continued to build upgrades to the AV into the early 1990s, even after Honda had stopped badging the engines. When Honda moved into the new Formula 3000 series, Judd again developed the company's engine. Based on the architecture of the AV, the new BV V8 was a naturally aspirated variant, and would eventually form the basis for the Judd CV Formula One engine.

Judd BV (Honda RA386E)

Overview
- Manufacturer: (United Kingdom) / (Japan) Judd-Honda
- Production: 1986–1992

Layout
- Configuration: 90° V8
- Displacement: 3.0 L (183 cu in)
- Cylinder bore: 92 mm (3.6 in)
- Piston stroke: 56.4 mm (2 in)
- Valvetrain: 32-valve, DOHC, four-valves per cylinder

Combustion
- Fuel system: Electronic fuel injection
- Fuel type: Gasoline
- Oil system: Dry sump

Output
- Power output: 470–480 hp (350–358 kW)
- Torque output: 280 lb⋅ft (380 N⋅m)

=== KV ===
Judd KV

Overview
- Manufacturer: (United Kingdom) Judd
- Production: 1993–2004

Layout
- Configuration: 90° V8
- Displacement: 3.0 L (183 cu in)
- Cylinder bore: 88 mm (3.5 in)
- Piston stroke: 61.5 mm (2 in)
- Cylinder block material: Aluminium and magnesium alloy
- Cylinder head material: Aluminium and magnesium alloy
- Valvetrain: 32-valve, DOHC, four-valves per cylinder
- Compression ratio: 13:1

Combustion
- Fuel system: Direct fuel injection
- Fuel type: Gasoline
- Oil system: Dry sump

Output
- Power output: 450–520 hp (336–388 kW)
- Torque output: 290–300 lb⋅ft (393–407 N⋅m)

Dimensions
- Dry weight: 120 kg (265 lb)

After the company's departure from Formula One, Judd returned to Formula 3000 in 1995 with the development of the 3-litre KV V8 engine. Judd built the engines that every Formula 3000 team used, although Zytek was tasked with maintaining the over 80 engines after they were built. Judd stopped production of the KV and the Formula 3000 series ended in 2004; contrary to rumour, Zytek did not use the KV engine as a basis for the A1 Grand Prix units in 2005, but used their own V8 designed by ex-Judd engineer Hiro Kaneda.

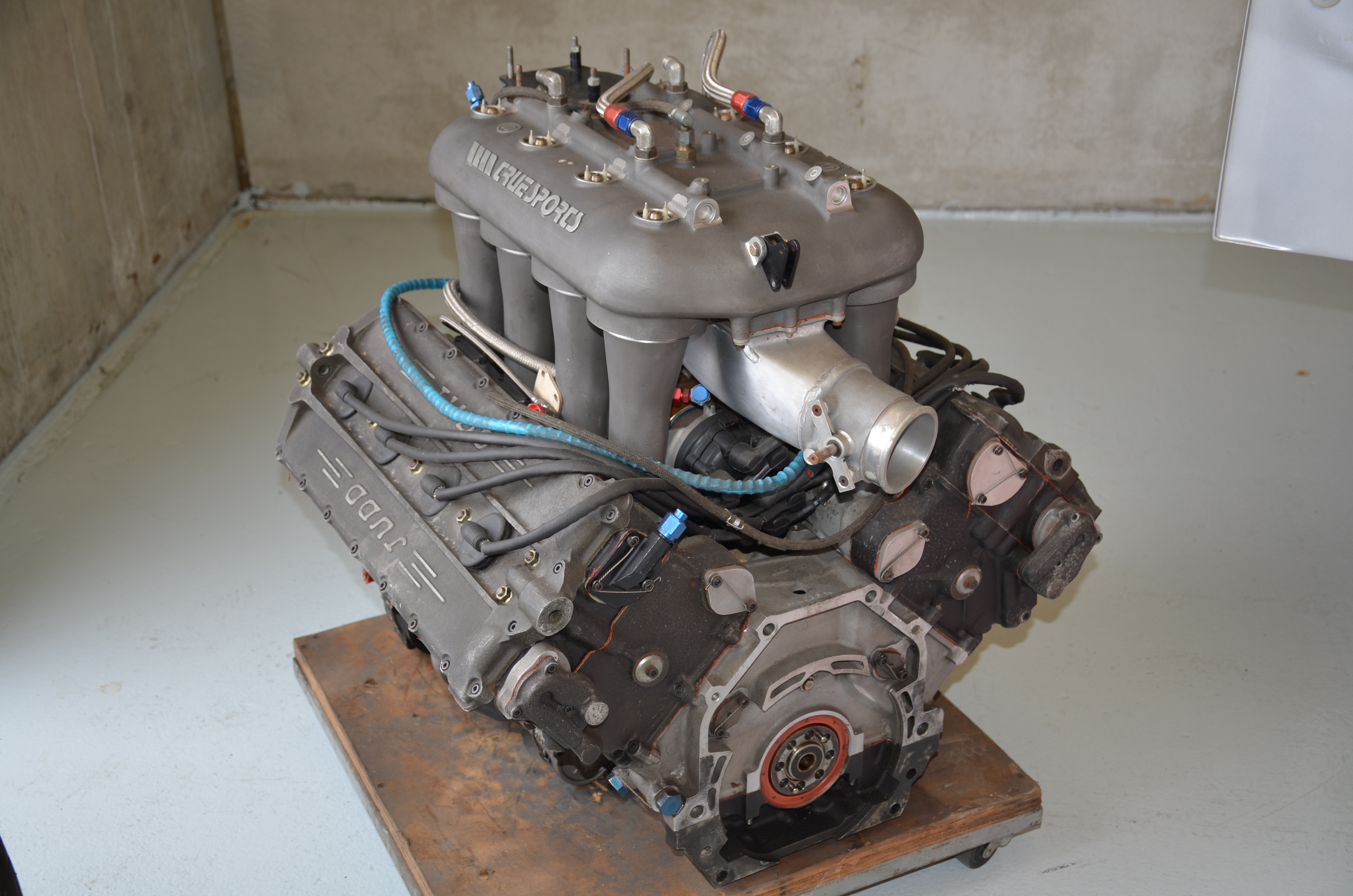
1988 Truesports Judd AV Indy car engine

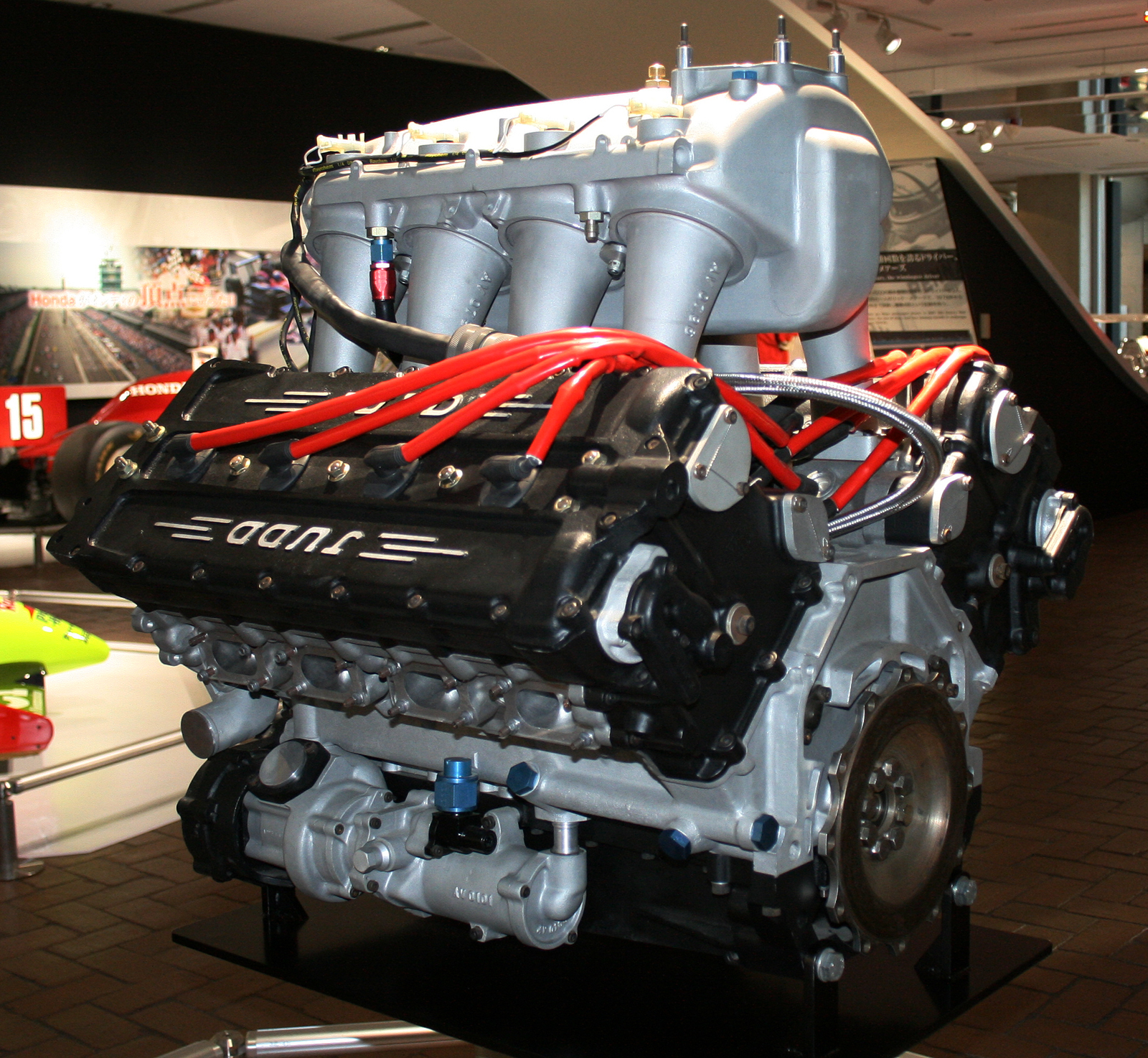
1989 Judd AV 2.65 L V8 Indy car engine

== Formula One ==
Judd as a Formula One engine manufacturer
Formula One World Championship career
- First entry: 1988 Brazilian Grand Prix
- Last entry: 1992 Belgian Grand Prix
- Races entered: 76 (68 starts)
- Chassis: Ligier, March, Williams, Brabham, EuroBrun, Lotus, Leyton House, Life, Dallara, Andrea Moda
- Constructors' Championships: 0
- Drivers' Championships: 0
- Race victories: 0
- Podiums: 8
- Points: 86
- Pole positions: 0
- Fastest laps: 3

In 1988, in conjunction with March Engineering, Judd made the move into the recently reintroduced normally aspirated variant of Formula One, which would completely replace turbocharged cars in 1989. By using the existing BV V8 as the starting point for their new F1 engine, Judd saved cost while at the same time producing a customer engine that could compete on track and in the marketplace with the Ford-Cosworth V8s that were standard equipment for the (mostly smaller) teams competing to the new rules.

=== CV ===
Judd CV

Overview
- Manufacturer: (United Kingdom) Judd
- Production: 1988–1990

Layout
- Configuration: 90° V8
- Displacement: 3.5 L (3,498 cc)
- Cylinder bore: 94 mm (3.7 in)
- Piston stroke: 63 mm (2.5 in)
- Valvetrain: 32-valve, DOHC, four-valves per cylinder

Combustion
- Fuel system: Direct fuel injection
- Oil system: Dry sump

Output
- Power output: 570–610 hp (425–455 kW)
- Torque output: 320–340 lb⋅ft (434–461 N⋅m)

Dimensions
- Length: 540 mm (21 in)
- Width: 545 mm (21.5 in)
- Height: 665 mm (26.2 in)
- Dry weight: 127 kg (280 lb)

The first Formula One engine developed by Judd, the CV, was built to the 3.5-litre engine formula for naturally aspirated engines. The engine shared many design features with the Judd BV engine, but was expanded to 3.5 litres. March Engineering was the first team who signed to use the Judd CV. Reigning World Constructors' champion Williams was later forced also to turn to Judd, after they lost their supply of Honda engines for 1988. In addition, Ligier also bought CVs for use in the 1988 season. Judd-powered cars finished in podium positions four times during their debut season, with Williams' lead driver, Nigel Mansell, scoring Judd's first podium when he finished second at the very wet 1988 British Grand Prix. The other podium finishes were the March of Ivan Capelli finishing 3rd in Belgium (he originally finished 4th on the road and many publications list this as so, but both Benetton Ford's, thus including 3rd placed Thierry Boutsen, were disqualified post-season for illegal fuel and Capelli was then officially listed as finishing 3rd). Capelli also finished a strong 2nd behind the McLaren Honda of Alain Prost in Portugal before Mansell again finished 2nd, behind Prost, at the very next race in Spain.

During the 1988 season, the Judd V8 was originally producing approximately 570 bhp (425 kW; 578 PS) (making Mansell's front row start at the opening race in Brazil all the more remarkable), and through constant development work throughout the season saw power rise to around 590 bhp (440 kW; 598 PS) by season's end (compared to around 610 bhp (455 kW; 618 PS) for the Cosworth built and developed Ford DFR V8, and around 670 bhp (500 kW; 679 PS) for the Honda V6 turbo). Despite its comparative lack of power, the Judd V8 was commonly the fastest of the non-turbo engines, and the slippery, Adrian Newey designed March 881's of Capelli and his Brazilian team mate Maurício Gugelmin regularly recorded higher speeds through the speed traps than the Ford DFR and the superseded Ford DFZ powered cars, with Gugelmin recording the fastest "atmo" speed trap of the season when he hit 312 km/h (194 mph) during qualifying for the German Grand Prix at Hockenheim (though this was still considerably slower than the turbo-powered McLaren Hondas which were timed at 333 km/h (207 mph)).

It was at the race after Spain, the 1988 Japanese Grand Prix, where Ivan Capelli's Judd-powered March became the first naturally-aspirated car to lead a lap of a Grand Prix since 1983, when he briefly passed the McLaren Honda of two-time World Drivers' champion Alain Prost for the lead on lap 16 of the 51 lap race after Prost missed a gear coming out of the Suzuka Circuit's final chicane. However, the power of the Honda turbo told and by the first corner, Capelli was back to second. Unfortunately Capelli's Judd engine then expired just 3 laps later, ending a solid second half of the season where the Judd engines not only regularly challenged the more powerful Ford DFR used exclusively by Benetton, as the engine to have in the "atmo" class, but also challenged the might of McLaren Honda who through their drivers Prost and that years World Drivers' Champion Ayrton Senna, both won and scored pole in 15 of the 16 races that made up the Formula One season.

For the 1989 season, Judd developed the all-new narrow-angle Judd EV, with a more compact 76-degree V angle, rather than the more conventional 90 degrees of the Judd AV/BV/CV, and the Cosworth DFV series. Construction of the CV continued as a cheaper alternative for smaller teams while power was upped to around 610 bhp (455 kW; 618 PS). Team Lotus and EuroBrun were the only CV customers, with Lotus finishing sixth in the Constructors' Championship. EuroBrun was originally the only team to continue with the CV unit into 1990, but Life eventually bought CV units to replace their failed in-house W12 engine design.

=== EV ===
Judd EV

Overview
- Manufacturer: (United Kingdom) Judd
- Production: 1989–1992

Layout
- Configuration: 76° V8
- Displacement: 3.5 L (3,495 cc)
- Cylinder bore: 99 mm (3.9 in)
- Piston stroke: 56.75 mm (2.2 in)
- Valvetrain: 32-valve, DOHC, four-valves per cylinder

Combustion
- Fuel system: Direct fuel injection
- Oil system: Dry sump

Output
- Power output: 620–680 hp (462–507 kW)
- Torque output: 320–400 lb⋅ft (434–542 N⋅m)

Dimensions
- Length: 555 mm (21.9 in)
- Width: 525 mm (20.7 in)
- Height: 615 mm (24.2 in)
- Dry weight: 125–127 kg (276–280 lb)

The previous Judd CV was designed with a conventional 90-degree engine block. Following the 1988 season it was decided that a narrower vee-angle would be adopted to give a more compact engine; the original intent was a 75-degree vee, but limitations in Judd's CNC equipment (it could only work in even-degree increments) meant that 76 degrees was used instead.

March Engineering upgraded their 1988 CV unit to an EV in 1989, while Brabham was also supplied with the new engines. Brabham and March each scored one podium with the EV engine. Both teams continued with the EV in 1990, although March Engineering was renamed Leyton House Racing. Leyton House took the engine's only podium of the season, a second place at the French Grand Prix. For 1991, Team Lotus was the only team to use the older EV.

=== GV ===
Judd GV

Overview
- Manufacturer: (United Kingdom) Judd
- Production: 1991–1992

Layout
- Configuration: 72° V10
- Displacement: 3.5 L (3,496 cc)
- Cylinder bore: 92 mm (3.6 in)
- Piston stroke: 52.6 mm (2.1 in)
- Valvetrain: 40-valve, DOHC, four-valves per cylinder

Combustion
- Fuel system: Direct fuel injection
- Oil system: Dry sump

Output
- Power output: 750 hp (559 kW)
- Torque output: 345 lb⋅ft (468 N⋅m)

Dimensions
- Dry weight: 130 kg (287 lb)

In the normally aspirated 3.5-litre formula, ten and twelve cylinder engines had proved to be more powerful than V8s. This prompted Judd to replace the CV and EV V8s with an all-new engine in 1991 for the BMS Scuderia Italia team. The new 72-degree angle V10 engine would carry the GV name. The GV V10 engine was based on Honda RA101E V10 technology. The engine was powerful, helping the team to a podium finish in the San Marino Grand Prix.

Judd's agreement with Scuderia Italia ended following the 1991 season, leaving the GVs to be used by the Brabham team and newcomers Andrea Moda Formula in 1992. Neither team scored a point all season and Judd Engines pulled out of Formula One.

=== Yamaha partnership ===
Following Judd's withdrawal from Formula One in 1992, John Judd turned to Yamaha to continue production of his engines. Using the Judd GV V10 as a base, Yamaha developed an all-new cylinder head and branded the motor as the OX10, for use by Tyrrell Racing in 1993. Once again, Tyrrell were unable to score any points all season. An improved OX10B for 1994 boosted Tyrrell's performance, as the team scored a podium and finished sixth in the Constructors' Championship.

Rule changes in 1995 saw the OX10C (known by Judd as the HV) reduced to 3 litres, although the architecture of the engine was generally the same. Tyrrell's performance fell off again however, as the team scored five points and finished eighth in the championship. 1996 saw the same points total from Tyrrell, although the new Yamaha OX11 (Judd JV) engine was an all-new design. After 1996 Tyrrell switched to using Ford-branded engines.

An updated C-Spec version of the OX11 was used by Arrows in 1997. Featuring a new bottom end, with changes consisting of a revised sump, crankshaft, oil pump and water pump; the OX11C had an extremely low centre of gravity (and a dry weight of 105 kg (231 lb) vs the Renault RS09's 121 kg (267 lb)) but was underpowered (708 hp (528 kW) vs the RS09's 755 hp (563 kW)) and most of all unreliable.

Consequently, a D-Spec was introduced for the fourth race, at Imola, with significant improvements in the airflow management of the combustion chamber area, which permitted the OX11D to gain 20 hp (15 kW), which along with superior Bridgestone tyres propelled Damon Hill to a second place at the Hungaroring, the 11th race of a year that otherwise was pretty lacklustre with Pedro Diniz's 5th place at the Nürburgring as a last high point before Yamaha consequently pulled the plug on the failing project.

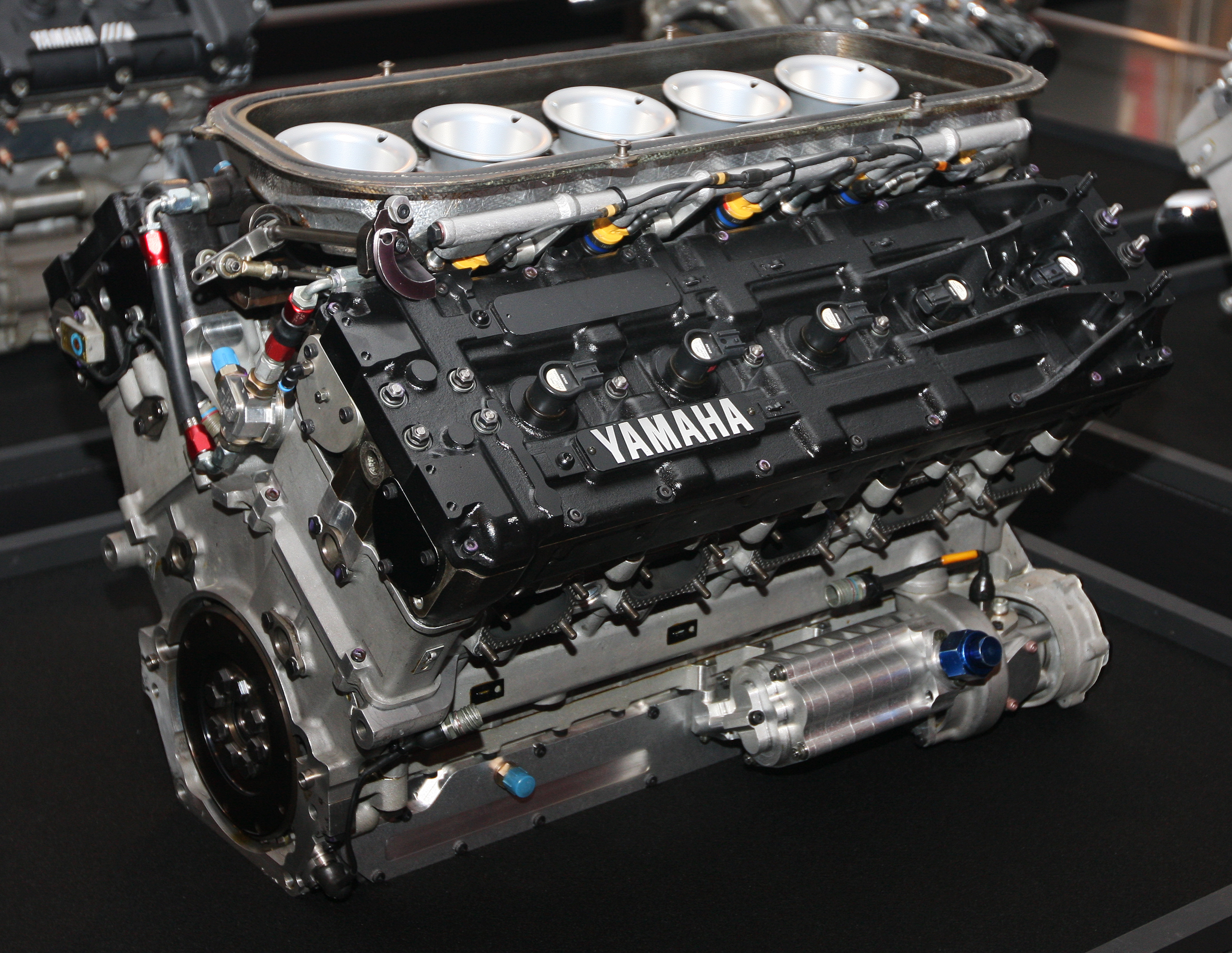
1993 Yamaha OX10A engine, a variant of the Judd GV engine

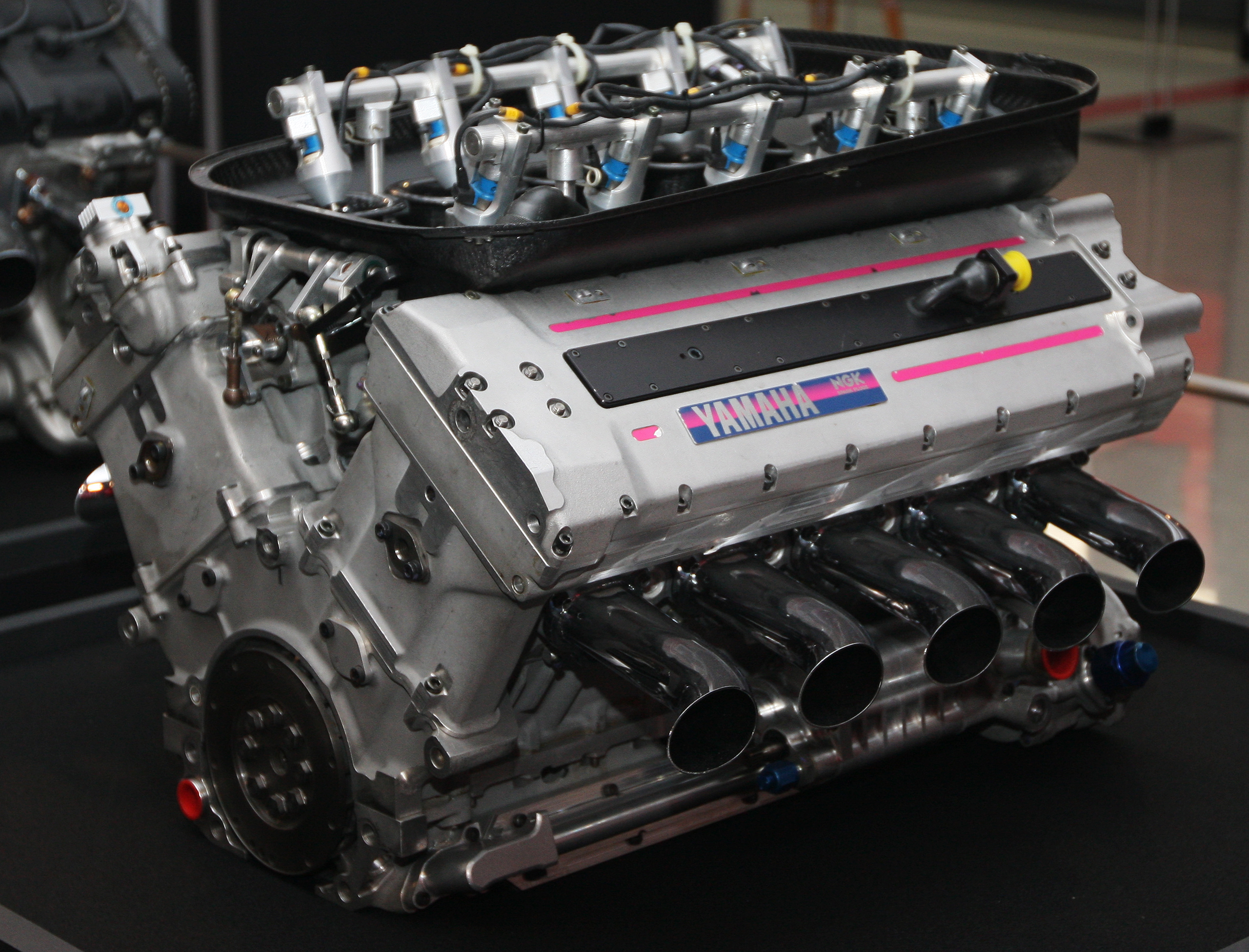
1997 Yamaha OX11C engine, a variant of the Judd JV engine

=== Complete Formula One World Championship results ===
(key) (Races in bold indicate pole position) (Races in italics indicate fastest lap)

Year	Entrant	Chassis	Engine	Tyres	Drivers	1	2	3	4	5	6	7	8	9	10	11	12	13	14	15	16	17	Pts.	WCC
1988	Leyton House March Racing Team	March 881	Judd CV 3.5 V8	G		BRA	SMR	MON	MEX	CAN	DET	FRA	GBR	GER	HUN	BEL	ITA	POR	ESP	JPN	AUS		22	6th
1988	Leyton House March Racing Team	March 881	Judd CV 3.5 V8	G	Maurício Gugelmin	Ret	15	Ret	Ret	Ret	Ret	8	4	8	5	Ret	8	Ret	7	10	Ret		22	6th
1988	Leyton House March Racing Team	March 881	Judd CV 3.5 V8	G	Ivan Capelli	Ret	Ret	10	16	5	DNS	9	Ret	5	Ret	3	5	2	Ret	Ret	6		22	6th
1988	Ligier Loto	Ligier JS31	Judd CV 3.5 V8	G	René Arnoux	Ret	DNQ	Ret	Ret	Ret	Ret	DNQ	18	17	Ret	Ret	13	10	Ret	17	Ret		0	NC
1988	Ligier Loto	Ligier JS31	Judd CV 3.5 V8	G	Stefan Johansson	9	DNQ	Ret	10	Ret	Ret	DNQ	DNQ	DNQ	Ret	11	DNQ	Ret	Ret	DNQ	9		0	NC
1988	Canon Williams Team	Williams FW12	Judd CV 3.5 V8	G	Nigel Mansell	Ret	Ret	Ret	Ret	Ret	Ret	Ret	2	Ret	Ret			Ret	2	Ret	Ret		20	7th
1988	Canon Williams Team	Williams FW12	Judd CV 3.5 V8	G	Martin Brundle											7							20	7th
1988	Canon Williams Team	Williams FW12	Judd CV 3.5 V8	G	Jean-Louis Schlesser												11						20	7th
1988	Canon Williams Team	Williams FW12	Judd CV 3.5 V8	G	Riccardo Patrese	Ret	13	6	Ret	Ret	Ret	Ret	8	Ret	6	Ret	7	Ret	5	6	4		20	7th
1989	Motor Racing Developments	Brabham BT58	Judd EV 3.5 V8	P		BRA	SMR	MON	MEX	USA	CAN	FRA	GBR	GER	HUN	BEL	ITA	POR	ESP	JPN	AUS		8	9th
1989	Motor Racing Developments	Brabham BT58	Judd EV 3.5 V8	P	Martin Brundle	Ret	Ret	6	9	Ret	DNPQ	DNPQ	Ret	8	12	Ret	6	8	Ret	5	Ret		8	9th
1989	Motor Racing Developments	Brabham BT58	Judd EV 3.5 V8	P	Stefano Modena	Ret	Ret	3	10	Ret	Ret	Ret	Ret	Ret	11	Ret	EX	14	Ret	Ret	8		8	9th
1989	EuroBrun Racing	EuroBrun ER188B; EuroBrun ER189	Judd CV 3.5 V8	P	Gregor Foitek	DNQ	DNPQ	DNPQ	DNPQ	DNPQ	DNPQ	DNPQ	DNPQ	DNPQ	DNPQ	DNPQ							0	NC
1989	EuroBrun Racing	EuroBrun ER188B; EuroBrun ER189	Judd CV 3.5 V8	P	Oscar Larrauri												DNPQ	DNPQ	DNPQ	DNPQ	DNPQ		0	NC
1989	Leyton House March Racing Team	March 881	Judd CV 3.5 V8	G	Maurício Gugelmin	3	Ret																4	12th
1989	Leyton House March Racing Team	March 881	Judd CV 3.5 V8	G	Ivan Capelli	Ret	Ret																4	12th
1989	Leyton House March Racing Team	March CG891	Judd EV 3.5 V8	G	Maurício Gugelmin			Ret	DNQ	DSQ	Ret	NC	Ret	Ret	Ret	7	Ret	10	Ret	7	7		4	12th
1989	Leyton House March Racing Team	March CG891	Judd EV 3.5 V8	G	Ivan Capelli			11	Ret	Ret	Ret	Ret	Ret	Ret	Ret	12	Ret	Ret	Ret	Ret	Ret		4	12th
1989	Camel Team Lotus	Lotus 101	Judd CV 3.5 V8	G	Nelson Piquet	Ret	Ret	Ret	11	Ret	4	8	4	5	6	DNQ	Ret	Ret	8	4	Ret		15	6th
1989	Camel Team Lotus	Lotus 101	Judd CV 3.5 V8	G	Satoru Nakajima	8	NC	DNQ	Ret	Ret	DNQ	Ret	8	Ret	Ret	DNQ	10	7	Ret	Ret	4		15	6th
1990	Motor Racing Developments	Brabham BT58; Brabham BT59	Judd EV 3.5 V8	P		USA	BRA	SMR	MON	CAN	MEX	FRA	GBR	GER	HUN	BEL	ITA	POR	ESP	JPN	AUS		2	10th
1990	Motor Racing Developments	Brabham BT58; Brabham BT59	Judd EV 3.5 V8	P	Stefano Modena	5	Ret	Ret	Ret	7	11	13	9	Ret	Ret	17	Ret	Ret	Ret	Ret	12		2	10th
1990	Motor Racing Developments	Brabham BT58; Brabham BT59	Judd EV 3.5 V8	P	Gregor Foitek	Ret	Ret																2	10th
1990	Motor Racing Developments	Brabham BT58; Brabham BT59	Judd EV 3.5 V8	P	David Brabham			DNQ	Ret	DNQ	Ret	15	DNQ	Ret	DNQ	Ret	DNQ	Ret	DNQ	Ret	Ret		2	10th
1990	EuroBrun Racing	EuroBrun ER189B	Judd CV 3.5 V8	P	Roberto Moreno	13	DNPQ	Ret	DNQ	DNQ	EX	DNPQ	DNPQ	DNPQ	DNPQ	DNPQ	DNPQ	DNPQ	DNPQ				0	NC
1990	EuroBrun Racing	EuroBrun ER189B	Judd CV 3.5 V8	P	Claudio Langes	DNPQ	DNPQ	DNPQ	DNPQ	DNPQ	DNPQ	DNPQ	DNPQ	DNPQ	DNPQ	DNPQ	DNPQ	DNPQ	DNPQ				0	NC
1990	Leyton House Racing	Leyton House CG901	Judd EV 3.5 V8	G	Maurício Gugelmin	14	DNQ	Ret	DNQ	DNQ	DNQ	Ret	DNS	Ret	8	6	Ret	12	8	Ret	Ret		7	7th
1990	Leyton House Racing	Leyton House CG901	Judd EV 3.5 V8	G	Ivan Capelli	Ret	DNQ	Ret	Ret	10	DNQ	2	Ret	7	Ret	7	Ret	Ret	Ret	Ret	Ret		7	7th
1990	Life Racing Engines	Life L190	Judd CV 3.5 V8	G	Bruno Giacomelli													DNPQ	DNPQ				0	NC
1991	Scuderia Italia	Dallara F191	Judd GV 3.5 V10	P		USA	BRA	SMR	MON	CAN	MEX	FRA	GBR	GER	HUN	BEL	ITA	POR	ESP	JPN	AUS		5	8th
1991	Scuderia Italia	Dallara F191	Judd GV 3.5 V10	P	Emanuele Pirro	Ret	11	DNPQ	6	9	DNPQ	DNPQ	10	10	Ret	8	10	Ret	15	Ret	7		5	8th
1991	Scuderia Italia	Dallara F191	Judd GV 3.5 V10	P	JJ Lehto	Ret	Ret	3	11	Ret	Ret	Ret	13	Ret	Ret	Ret	Ret	Ret	8	Ret	12		5	8th
1991	Team Lotus	Lotus 102B	Judd EV 3.5 V8	G	Mika Häkkinen	13	9	5	Ret	Ret	9	DNQ	12	Ret	14	Ret	14	14	Ret	Ret	19		3	9th
1991	Team Lotus	Lotus 102B	Judd EV 3.5 V8	G	Julian Bailey	DNQ	DNQ	6	DNQ														3	9th
1991	Team Lotus	Lotus 102B	Judd EV 3.5 V8	G	Johnny Herbert					DNQ	10	10	14			7		Ret		Ret	11		3	9th
1991	Team Lotus	Lotus 102B	Judd EV 3.5 V8	G	Michael Bartels									DNQ	DNQ		DNQ		DNQ				3	9th
1992	Andrea Moda Formula	Andrea Moda C4B; Andrea Moda S921	Judd GV 3.5 V10	G		RSA	MEX	BRA	ESP	SMR	MON	CAN	FRA	GBR	GER	HUN	BEL	ITA	POR	JPN	AUS		0	NC
1992	Andrea Moda Formula	Andrea Moda C4B; Andrea Moda S921	Judd GV 3.5 V10	G	Alex Caffi	EX	DNP																0	NC
1992	Andrea Moda Formula	Andrea Moda C4B; Andrea Moda S921	Judd GV 3.5 V10	G	Enrico Bertaggia	EX	DNP																0	NC
1992	Andrea Moda Formula	Andrea Moda C4B; Andrea Moda S921	Judd GV 3.5 V10	G	Roberto Moreno			DNPQ	DNPQ	DNPQ	Ret	DNPQ	DNA	DNPQ	DNPQ	DNQ	DNQ						0	NC
1992	Andrea Moda Formula	Andrea Moda C4B; Andrea Moda S921	Judd GV 3.5 V10	G	Perry McCarthy			DNP	DNPQ	DNPQ	DNPQ	DNP	DNA	DNPQ	EX	DNPQ	DNQ						0	NC
1992	Motor Racing Developments	Brabham BT60B	Judd GV 3.5 V10	G	Eric van de Poele	13	DNQ	DNQ	DNQ	DNQ	DNQ	DNQ	DNQ	DNQ	DNQ								0	NC
1992	Motor Racing Developments	Brabham BT60B	Judd GV 3.5 V10	G	Giovanna Amati	DNQ	DNQ	DNQ															0	NC
1992	Motor Racing Developments	Brabham BT60B	Judd GV 3.5 V10	G	Damon Hill				DNQ	DNQ	DNQ	DNQ	DNQ	16	DNQ	11							0	NC
Engines badged as Yamaha
1993	Tyrrell Racing Organisation	Tyrrell 020C; Tyrrell 021	Yamaha OX10A (Judd GV) 3.5 V10	G		RSA	BRA	EUR	SMR	ESP	MON	CAN	FRA	GBR	GER	HUN	BEL	ITA	POR	JPN	AUS		0	NC
1993	Tyrrell Racing Organisation	Tyrrell 020C; Tyrrell 021	Yamaha OX10A (Judd GV) 3.5 V10	G	Ukyo Katayama	Ret	Ret	Ret	Ret	Ret	Ret	17	Ret	13	Ret	10	15	14	Ret	Ret	Ret		0	NC
1993	Tyrrell Racing Organisation	Tyrrell 020C; Tyrrell 021	Yamaha OX10A (Judd GV) 3.5 V10	G	Andrea de Cesaris	Ret	Ret	Ret	Ret	DSQ	10	Ret	15	NC	Ret	11	Ret	13	12	Ret	13		0	NC
1994	Tyrrell Racing Organisation	Tyrrell 022	Yamaha OX10B (Judd GV) 3.5 V10	G		BRA	PAC	SMR	MON	ESP	CAN	FRA	GBR	GER	HUN	BEL	ITA	POR	EUR	JPN	AUS		13	7th
1994	Tyrrell Racing Organisation	Tyrrell 022	Yamaha OX10B (Judd GV) 3.5 V10	G	Ukyo Katayama	5	Ret	5	Ret	Ret	Ret	Ret	6	Ret	Ret	Ret	Ret	Ret	7	Ret	Ret		13	7th
1994	Tyrrell Racing Organisation	Tyrrell 022	Yamaha OX10B (Judd GV) 3.5 V10	G	Mark Blundell	Ret	Ret	9	Ret	3	10	10	Ret	Ret	5	5	Ret	Ret	13	Ret	Ret		13	7th
1995	Nokia Tyrrell Yamaha	Tyrrell 023	Yamaha OX10C (Judd HV) 3.0 V10	G		BRA	ARG	SMR	ESP	MON	CAN	FRA	GBR	GER	HUN	BEL	ITA	POR	EUR	PAC	JPN	AUS	5	8th
1995	Nokia Tyrrell Yamaha	Tyrrell 023	Yamaha OX10C (Judd HV) 3.0 V10	G	Ukyo Katayama	Ret	8	Ret	Ret	Ret	Ret	Ret	Ret	7	Ret	Ret	10	Ret		14	Ret	Ret	5	8th
1995	Nokia Tyrrell Yamaha	Tyrrell 023	Yamaha OX10C (Judd HV) 3.0 V10	G	Gabriele Tarquini														14				5	8th
1995	Nokia Tyrrell Yamaha	Tyrrell 023	Yamaha OX10C (Judd HV) 3.0 V10	G	Mika Salo	7	Ret	Ret	10	Ret	7	15	8	Ret	Ret	8	5	13	10	12	6	5	5	8th
1996	Tyrrell Yamaha	Tyrrell 024	Yamaha OX11A (Judd JV) 3.0 V10	G		AUS	BRA	ARG	EUR	SMR	MON	ESP	CAN	FRA	GBR	GER	HUN	BEL	ITA	POR	JPN		5	8th
1996	Tyrrell Yamaha	Tyrrell 024	Yamaha OX11A (Judd JV) 3.0 V10	G	Ukyo Katayama	11	9	Ret	DSQ	Ret	Ret	Ret	Ret	Ret	Ret	Ret	7	8	10	12	Ret		5	8th
1996	Tyrrell Yamaha	Tyrrell 024	Yamaha OX11A (Judd JV) 3.0 V10	G	Mika Salo	6	5	Ret	DSQ	Ret	5	DSQ	Ret	10	7	9	Ret	7	Ret	11	Ret		5	8th
1997	Danka Arrows Yamaha	Arrows A18	Yamaha OX11C/D (Judd JV) 3.0 V10	B		AUS	BRA	ARG	SMR	MON	ESP	CAN	FRA	GBR	GER	HUN	BEL	ITA	AUT	LUX	JPN	EUR	9	8th
1997	Danka Arrows Yamaha	Arrows A18	Yamaha OX11C/D (Judd JV) 3.0 V10	B	Damon Hill	DNS	17	Ret	Ret	Ret	Ret	9	12	6	8	2	13	Ret	7	8	12	Ret	9	8th
1997	Danka Arrows Yamaha	Arrows A18	Yamaha OX11C/D (Judd JV) 3.0 V10	B	Pedro Diniz	10	Ret	Ret	Ret	Ret	Ret	8	Ret	Ret	Ret	Ret	7	Ret	13	5	13	Ret	9	8th

== Sports car racing ==
=== GV10 ===
Judd GV10

Overview
- Manufacturer: (United Kingdom) Judd
- Production: 1992–1993

Layout
- Configuration: 72° V10
- Displacement: 3.5 L (3,498 cc)
- Cylinder bore: 94 mm (3.7 in)
- Piston stroke: 50.4 mm (2.0 in)
- Valvetrain: 40-valve, DOHC, four-valves per cylinder

Combustion
- Fuel system: Direct fuel injection
- Oil system: Dry sump

Output
- Power output: 650–700 hp (485–522 kW)
- Torque output: 250–294 lb⋅ft (339–399 N⋅m)

Dimensions
- Dry weight: 135–145 kg (298–320 lb)

In 1991, the World Sportscar Championship introduced an engine formula nearly identical to Formula One. This was an attempt to decrease cost by allowing sportscar teams to purchase Formula One engines, while at the same time encouraging major sportscar manufacturers to enter Formula One. This allowed for Judd to offer their GV V10 to customers following modifications to meet the endurance requirements necessary in the World Sportscar Championship.

As financial troubles hit other teams, the Judd V10 became one of the few privately funded engines for the top C1 class. Mazda was forced to turn to Judd to replace their outlawed rotary engines, although the GV10s would be rebadged as Mazda MV10s. Euro Racing, also purchased GV10s for their Lola T92/10s. Mazda finished third in the team's championship while Euro Racing took fifth.

The World Sportscar Championship was cancelled in 1993, quickly ending Judd's first brief involvement in sports car racing.

=== GV4 ===
Judd GV4

Overview
- Manufacturer: (United Kingdom) Judd
- Production: 1999–present

Layout
- Configuration: 72° V10
- Displacement: 4.0 L (3,997 cc)
- Cylinder bore: 94 mm (3.7 in)
- Piston stroke: 57.6 mm (2.3 in)
- Valvetrain: 40-valve, DOHC, four-valves per cylinder

Combustion
- Fuel system: Direct fuel injection
- Oil system: Dry sump

Output
- Power output: 730–750 hp (544–559 kW)
- Torque output: 332–375 lb⋅ft (450–508 N⋅m)

Dimensions
- Dry weight: 135–145 kg (298–320 lb)

After engine involvement with Yamaha in Formula One, Judd returned once again to sports car racing. Believing that a large naturally aspirated engine would be fitting for use as a customer supply in the Sports Racing World Cup, Judd resurrected the GV10 from a few years earlier. Expanded to four litres and upgraded with new technology, the new GV4 became a favorite choice for teams not running the dominant Ferrari 333 SP, eventually winning the championship with Racing for Holland in 2002 and 2003. In 2000, a Doran Ferrari 333 SP-Judd hybrid appeared, the performance of the Judd engine being deemed superior to that of the six-year-old Italian unit, which was no longer supported by Ferrari.

The GV4s also became powerful enough to contest for overall wins in the 24 Hours of Le Mans, with Oreca Dallaras running the GV4 finishing fifth and sixth in 2002 as well as an overall victory for Doran Lista at the Rolex 24 at Daytona the same year. The engine's reliability record at Le Mans was still patchy and, while it could challenge for the pole in Domes and Dallaras, the engine RPMs had to be reduced to ensure it survived the race.

=== GV4.2 ===
Judd GV4.2

Overview
- Manufacturer: (United Kingdom) Judd
- Production: 2013–present

Layout
- Configuration: 72° V10
- Displacement: 4.2 L (4,198 cc)
- Cylinder bore: 94 mm (3.7 in)
- Piston stroke: 60.5 mm (2.4 in)
- Valvetrain: 40-valve, DOHC, four-valves per cylinder

Combustion
- Fuel system: Direct fuel injection
- Oil system: Dry sump

Output
- Power output: 750–775 hp (559–578 kW)
- Torque output: 383–430 lb⋅ft (519–583 N⋅m)

Dimensions
- Dry weight: 135 kg (298 lb)

The 4.2-litre GV V10 engine was designed and developed for the 2013 season as a result of the remarkable success of the GV4 engine in the Boss series. Compared to the 4.0-litre GV V10 engine, the 4.2-litre GV V10 has been modernized; with lighter cylinder heads, twin-barrel throttles, and a lower centre of gravity. The engine is also 10 kg lighter than the 4-litre version. The engine made its race debut in April 2013 at the Hockenheim circuit in Germany, scoring a double victory on its debut. The engine was expertly installed in the Benetton chassis by Kevin Mansell.

Further success has followed in the 2014, 2015 and 2016 seasons.

=== KV675 ===
Judd KV675

Overview
- Manufacturer: (United Kingdom) Judd
- Production: 2001–2005

Layout
- Configuration: 90° V8
- Displacement: 3.4 L (3,392 cc)
- Cylinder bore: 94 mm (3.7 in)
- Piston stroke: 61.1 mm (2.4 in)
- Valvetrain: 32-valve, DOHC, four-valves per cylinder

Combustion
- Fuel system: Electronic fuel injection
- Fuel type: Gasoline
- Oil system: Dry sump

Output
- Power output: 450 hp (336 kW)
- Torque output: 265 lb⋅ft (359 N⋅m)

In 2001, the Automobile Club de l'Ouest (ACO), organisers of the 24 Hours of Le Mans, announced new regulations for Le Mans Prototypes. The smaller LMP675 category would allow naturally aspirated V8 engines up to 3.4 litres. Using the design of the Formula 3000 KV V8, Judd expanded the engine to the maximum of 3.4 litres and reinforced it for endurance racing, creating the KV675.

In its debut year, the KV675 won the LMP675 championship in the American Le Mans Series for Dick Barbour Racing. However, factory-supported efforts by MG and then Zytek were the dominant efforts in LMP675, so the KV675 only won its class at the 2004 24 Hours of Le Mans. It also won the LMP2 class championship in the ALMS in 2005. Both victories were for Intersport Racing, installed at the back of their Lola B2K/40.

=== GV5 ===
Judd GV5

Overview
- Manufacturer: (United Kingdom) Judd
- Production: 2004–2012

Layout
- Configuration: 72° V10
- Displacement: 4,997 cc (5.0 L; 304.9 cu in); 5,496 cc (5.5 L; 335.4 cu in)
- Cylinder bore: 94 mm (3.7 in)
- Piston stroke: 72 mm (2.8 in); 79.2 mm (3.1 in)
- Valvetrain: 40-valve, DOHC, four-valves per cylinder

Combustion
- Fuel system: Direct fuel injection
- Oil system: Dry sump

Output
- Power output: 800–829 bhp (597–618 kW; 811–840 PS)
- Torque output: 445–550 lb⋅ft (603–746 N⋅m)

Dimensions
- Dry weight: 135–159 kg (298–351 lb)

In 2004, Judd introduced a variant of the GV4 known as the GV5. The engine capacity increase to five litres was an attempt to reduce rpms, increase torque, and increase reliability. The GV5 quickly proved its superiority over the GV4, when it took second place in the teams' championship in the Rolex Sports Car Series in its debut year with Doran Pescarolo Sport later went on to finish fourth at the 2004 24 Hours of Le Mans with a GV5. The following year, Pescarolo finished in second place at Le Mans and won the teams' championship in the Le Mans Endurance Series.

The GV5 received an upgrade in 2006, using lighter materials to decrease the weight of the unit by 20 kg (44 lb). The GV5 S2 showed its performance by taking the Pescarolo to second place once again at Le Mans behind Audi's R10 TDI, as well as winning every event in the Le Mans Series season.

The engine was further upgraded in 2007, with an increase in displacement to 5.5 litres to produce more torque while attaining the maximum power at lower rpms and improving fuel consumption, as the Judd GV5.5 S2.

=== XV675 ===
Judd XV675

Overview
- Manufacturer: (United Kingdom) Judd
- Production: 2004–2008

Layout
- Configuration: 90° V8
- Displacement: 3.4 L (3,395 cc)
- Cylinder bore: 92.9 mm (3.7 in)
- Piston stroke: 62.6 mm (2.5 in)
- Valvetrain: 32-valve, DOHC, four-valves per cylinder

Combustion
- Fuel system: Electronic fuel injection
- Fuel type: Gasoline
- Oil system: Dry sump

Output
- Power output: 540 hp (403 kW)
- Torque output: 270–350 lb⋅ft (366–475 N⋅m)

In an attempt to displace Ford and Cosworth as the only supplier of engines in the Champ Car World Series, Judd proposed a variant of the KV675 for use in the series through an agreement with MG, who would badge the engine. The deal did not come to fruition, but the development work performed based on the KV675 to adapt it to Champ Car was transferred to sports car racing. The improved engine, known as XV675, retained the 3.4-litre layout but included technology developed from the GV series of engines to increase revs and performance while reducing weight.

The XV675 debuted in 2004 with mixed success. Ray Mallock Ltd. earned the XV675 one of its few successes, winning the LMP2 class at the 2005 24 Hours of Le Mans, but the team later switched to the Advanced Engine Research turbocharged LMP2 engine which had become dominant in the class. It was used until 2008.

=== DB ===
Judd DB

Overview
- Manufacturer: (United Kingdom) Judd
- Production: 2004–2012

Layout
- Configuration: 90° V8
- Displacement: 3.0–4.4 L (183–269 cu in)
- Valvetrain: 32-valve, DOHC, four-valves per cylinder

Combustion
- Fuel system: Direct fuel injection
- Fuel type: Gasoline
- Oil system: Dry sump

Output
- Power output: 540–670 hp (403–500 kW)
- Torque output: 267–352 lb⋅ft (362–477 N⋅m)

Dimensions
- Dry weight: 110–116 kg (243–256 lb)

On September 12, 2007, Engine Developments announced their plans for a replacement for the XV675, termed the DB. Although it retained the 3.4-litre engine capacity, the unit was entirely new. Judd planned to work closely with a top LMP2 team in order to get better testing out of the DB in 2008 before the engine was released to any customers. The engine was found at the back of the numerous Lola B08/80 LMP2 cars in the LMS championship where it competed against the Zyteks and the Porsche RS Spyders.

=== HK ===
The Judd HK engine, also known as the Judd-BMW HK, was introduced in 2011, in accordance with new regulations set forth by the ACO for engines in the LMP2 class to be based on production engines to lower costs. The base of the engine is the 4.0-litre V8, BMW S65, that was fitted to the E90 M3. The engine was designated, "HK", after Hiro Kaneda who had died in 2010 and who designed the AIM (GV5.5 S2) V10 engine. It appeared in cars such as the Ligier JS P2, Lola B11/40, Lola B12/80, Norma M200P, Oreca 03 and the Pescarolo 01, across multiple series in North America, Europe and Asia.

Judd HK

Overview
- Manufacturer: (United Kingdom) Judd
- Production: 2011–2016

Layout
- Configuration: 90° V8
- Displacement: 3.6 L (3,597 cc)
- Cylinder block material: Aluminium alloy
- Cylinder head material: Aluminium alloy
- Valvetrain: 32-valve, DOHC, four-valves per cylinder
- Valvetrain drive system: Belt

RPM range
- Max. engine speed: 10,000

Combustion
- Fuel system: Electronic fuel injection
- Management: Motec M1 series
- Fuel type: Gasoline
- Oil system: Dry sump

Output
- Power output: 475 hp (354 kW)
- Torque output: 300 lb⋅ft (407 N⋅m)

Dimensions
- Length: 584 mm (23 in)
- Dry weight: 140 kg (309 lb)

== Touring car racing ==
In 1997, Engine Developments was chosen by Nissan Motors to lead their engine development program on the Primera for the British Touring Car Championship. Nissan went on to win the constructors' championship in 1998 and 1999, with Laurent Aïello winning the driver's title in 1999.

As part of MG's involvement with Judd elsewhere, the two worked together on MG's return to the British Touring Car Championship in 2004. Judd developed the K2000 engine for the MG ZS, with Anthony Reid finishing fourth in the driver's championship in their debut year. However, MG's financial troubles forced the company to drop out of the championship soon after, leaving the K2000 open to customers. Des Wheatley installed the engine in an MG Metro and won the British Rallycross Championship.
