= 1989 Monaco Grand Prix =

Coordinates: 43°44′4.74″N 7°25′16.8″E

- Race 3 of 16 in the 1989 Formula One World Championship
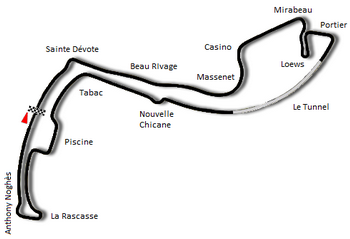

Race details
- Date: 7 May 1989
- Official name: 47e Grand Prix de Monaco
- Location: Circuit de Monaco; Monte Carlo
- Course: Temporary street circuit
- Course length: 3.328 km (2.068 miles)
- Distance: 77 laps, 256.256 km (159.230 miles)
- Scheduled distance: 78 laps, 259.584 km (161.298 miles)
- Weather: Warm, dry, sunny

Pole position
Driver	(Brazil) Ayrton Senna	McLaren-Honda
- Time: 1:22.308

Fastest lap
Driver	(France) Alain Prost	McLaren-Honda
- Time: 1:25.501 on lap 59

Podium
First	(Brazil) Ayrton Senna	McLaren-Honda
Second	(France) Alain Prost	McLaren-Honda
Third	(Italy) Stefano Modena	Brabham-Judd

The 1989 Monaco Grand Prix was a Formula One motor race held at the Circuit de Monaco, Monte Carlo on 7 May 1989. It was the third race of the 1989 Formula One World Championship. The 77-lap race was won from pole position by Ayrton Senna, driving a McLaren-Honda, with teammate Alain Prost second and Stefano Modena third in a Brabham-Judd.

== Background ==
The event, officially called the Grand Prix de Monaco, was the third round of the 1989 Formula One World Championship and was held at the Circuit de Monaco in Monte Carlo, Monaco. Free and qualifying practice sessions were held on Thursday 4 May and Saturday 6 May, with a morning warm-up session and the main Grand Prix race held on Sunday 7 May 1989. Thirty-nine cars were entered by twenty list of Formula One constructors, although Scuderia Ferrari withdrew one of their entries as Gerhard Berger had been injured during the previous race. Ferrari made changes to Nigel Mansell's cars to try to avoid a repeat of the failure that had caused Berger's prior crash, but were unable to complete certain planned upgrades in time for this event as they had to replace the car destroyed in Imola. Automobiles Gonfaronnaises Sportives (AGS), Arrows, Brabham, EuroBrun, Ligier, Larrousse, Team Lotus, McLaren, Onyx Grand Prix, Williams, and Zakspeed all brought updates or modifications to their cars for this race. March Engineering debuted Adrian Newey's CG891 at this event. Thirteen teams used Goodyear tyres whilst the other seven teams used Pirelli tyres.

== Qualifying ==
=== Pre-qualifying report ===
The field was one fewer in Monaco as Ferrari had elected not to run a second car to replace Berger, who had been injured in an accident during the last race at Imola (the Austrian was present in the pits at Monaco, but even with the Ferrari 640's revolutionary semi-automatic gearbox meaning he did not have to take his hands off the steering wheel, the burns on his hands were not sufficiently recovered to be able to take on the Circuit de Monaco). However, unlike the similar situation at the first race in Brazil, no extra pre-qualifier would be allowed through to the main qualifying sessions, and due to the much tighter confines of both the circuit and the pits, Monaco would only run with 29 cars.

Brabham again topped the time sheets during the Thursday morning pre-qualifying session, with Stefano Modena fastest, but the Dallara of Alex Caffi was only 0.141 seconds behind. Third was Pierre-Henri Raphanel, who put in a fine performance in his Coloni, pre-qualifying for the first, and ultimately, only time. The fourth pre-qualifier was the other Brabham, driven by Martin Brundle, who edged out the Osella of Piercarlo Ghinzani by just two-hundredths of a second.

Joining Ghinzani on the sidelines were Stefan Johansson in the Onyx, then Nicola Larini in the other Osella, followed by Bernd Schneider in the Zakspeed. Ninth was the other Onyx of Bertrand Gachot, ahead of the sole EuroBrun driven by Gregor Foitek. The Rial of Volker Weidler was eleventh, followed by Aguri Suzuki in the other Zakspeed. Slowest on this occasion was Joachim Winkelhock in the AGS.

=== Pre-qualifying classification ===
Pos	No	Driver	Constructor	Time	Gap
1	8	(Italy) Stefano Modena	Brabham-Judd	1:26.957	
2	21	(Italy) Alex Caffi	Dallara-Ford	1:27.098	+0.141
3	32	(France) Pierre-Henri Raphanel	Coloni-Ford	1:27.590	+0.633
4	7	(United Kingdom) Martin Brundle	Brabham-Judd	1:27.774	+0.817
5	18	(Italy) Piercarlo Ghinzani	Osella-Ford	1:27.795	+0.838
6	36	(Sweden) Stefan Johansson	Onyx-Ford	1.27.821	+0.864
7	17	(Italy) Nicola Larini	Osella-Ford	1:28.555	+1.598
8	34	(Germany) Bernd Schneider	Zakspeed-Yamaha	1:28.610	+1.653
9	37	(Belgium) Bertrand Gachot	Onyx-Ford	1:28.897	+1.940
10	33	(Switzerland) Gregor Foitek	EuroBrun-Judd	1:29.423	+2.466
11	39	(Germany) Volker Weidler	Rial-Ford	1:29.498	+2.541
12	35	(Japan) Aguri Suzuki	Zakspeed-Yamaha	1:30.528	+2.571
13	41	(Germany) Joachim Winkelhock	AGS-Ford	1:32.274	+4.317

=== Qualifying report ===
Tyrrell had a new car that looked promising, but only Jonathan Palmer competed with it on the first day of practice and qualifying. Michele Alboreto's car was not finished until the second day, and he refused to drive the older car. Ayrton Senna was on pole by a full second over teammate Alain Prost with Thierry Boutsen sharing row two with the surprisingly competitive Brabham of Martin Brundle. Nigel Mansell was fifth followed by Derek Warwick, Riccardo Patrese, Stefano Modena, Alex Caffi, and Andrea de Cesaris.

It was at this race that many in the paddock started noticing that the Pirelli qualifying tyres were superior to Goodyear's (the Brabhams and Caffi's Dallara ran on Pirelli rubber).

For the second Monaco in a row, Team Lotus, previous winners in the Principality on seven different occasions (1960, 1961, 1968, 1969, 1970, 1974 and 1987), started the race with only one car in the field. As he had done in 1988, Japanese driver Satoru Nakajima failed to qualify. Triple World Champion Nelson Piquet, never at ease on the Monaco streets, qualified 19th, 4.738 seconds behind Senna.

=== Qualifying classification ===
Pos	No	Driver	Constructor	Q1	Q2	Gap
1	1	(Brazil) Ayrton Senna	McLaren-Honda	1:24.126	1:22.308	
2	2	(France) Alain Prost	McLaren-Honda	1:24.671	1:23.456	+1.148
3	5	(Belgium) Thierry Boutsen	Williams-Renault	1:25.540	1:24.332	+2.024
4	7	(United Kingdom) Martin Brundle	Brabham-Judd	1:26.970	1:24.580	+2.272
5	27	(United Kingdom) Nigel Mansell	Ferrari	1:25.363	1:24.735	+2.427
6	9	(United Kingdom) Derek Warwick	Arrows-Ford	1:26.606	1:24.791	+2.483
7	6	(Italy) Riccardo Patrese	Williams-Renault	1:27.138	1:25.021	+2.713
8	8	(Italy) Stefano Modena	Brabham-Judd	1:27.598	1:25.086	+2.778
9	21	(Italy) Alex Caffi	Dallara-Ford	1:27.894	1:25.481	+3.173
10	22	(Italy) Andrea de Cesaris	Dallara-Ford	1:26.617	1:25.515	+3.207
11	23	(Italy) Pierluigi Martini	Minardi-Ford	1:28.469	1:26.288	+3.980
12	4	(Italy) Michele Alboreto	Tyrrell-Ford	No time	1:26.388	+4.080
13	40	(Italy) Gabriele Tarquini	AGS-Ford	1:26.603	1:26.422	+4.114
14	15	(Brazil) Maurício Gugelmin	March-Judd	1:28.917	1:26.522	+4.214
15	19	(Italy) Alessandro Nannini	Benetton-Ford	1:28.608	1:26.599	+4.291
16	26	(France) Olivier Grouillard	Ligier-Ford	1:27.040	1:26.792	+4.484
17	30	(France) Philippe Alliot	Lola-Lamborghini	1:26.975	1:26.857	+4.549
18	32	(France) Pierre-Henri Raphanel	Coloni-Ford	1:30.264	1:27.011	+4.703
19	11	(Brazil) Nelson Piquet	Lotus-Judd	1:29.047	1:27.046	+4.738
20	10	(United States) Eddie Cheever	Arrows-Ford	1:28.461	1:27.117	+4.809
21	25	(France) René Arnoux	Ligier-Ford	1:30.003	1:27.182	+4.874
22	16	(Italy) Ivan Capelli	March-Judd	1:29.800	1:27.302	+4.994
23	3	(United Kingdom) Jonathan Palmer	Tyrrell-Ford	1:29.151	1:27.452	+5.144
24	20	(United Kingdom) Johnny Herbert	Benetton-Ford	1:29.661	1:27.706	+5.398
25	31	(Brazil) Roberto Moreno	Coloni-Ford	1:30.209	1:27.721	+5.413
26	24	(Spain) Luis Pérez-Sala	Minardi-Ford	1:28.886	1:27.786	+5.478
27	38	(Germany) Christian Danner	Rial-Ford	1:28.737	1:27.910	+5.602
28	29	(France) Yannick Dalmas	Lola-Lamborghini	1:29.794	1:27.946	+5.638
29	12	(Japan) Satoru Nakajima	Lotus-Judd	1:28.568	1:28.419	+6.111

== Race ==
=== Race report ===
Pierre-Henri Raphanel made his only Grand Prix start in Monaco, driving for Coloni.

The first start was aborted when Patrese stalled his Williams. At the second start, for which Patrese was relegated to the back of the grid, Senna was first into Sainte-Dévote and Prost could do nothing but slot in behind him. The McLarens proceeded to pull away from the field, while behind them Williams were in all sorts of trouble, as both Boutsen and Patrese had to stop for new rear wings. Nigel Mansell went out on lap 20 with more gearbox issues for Ferrari and one of the talking points of the race came on lap 33 when de Cesaris attempted to pass Nelson Piquet at Loews Hairpin. The predictable accident occurred and some choice words were exchanged between the two drivers (while still in their respective cars) and a huge traffic jam was caused. Brundle was looking good in 3rd place in the Brabham, until he had to pit for a new battery and dropped back to seventh (the car's battery was located under the driver's legs forcing Brundle to evacuate the car to allow it to be changed. The problem ultimately cost him a podium finish).

Senna, continued to dominate the race while Prost, including having been slowed by the Piquet-de Cesaris incident (he lost over 20 seconds to Senna in one lap having to wait for clear road to get moving again), could not recover and finished second behind his team mate. He was also held up for many laps trying to lap the Ligier of former Renault team mate René Arnoux who ignored both his mirrors and the blue flags, prompting BBC commentator James Hunt to describe Arnoux's explanation of why he was off the pace compared to his race winning days as "bullshit" on live television. Senna took his second win at Monaco despite his McLaren losing first and second gear later in the race. Modena benefited from Brundle's stop and finished third, scoring his first points in Formula One and Brabham's last podium finish. Alex Caffi, Michele Alboreto, and Brundle, who was promoted to sixth on the final lap as a result of the retirement of Ivan Capelli, completed the point scoring positions. Caffi achieved both his and Dallara's first points while Alboreto scored Tyrrell's first points with their new car.

=== Race classification ===
Pos	No	Driver	Constructor	Laps	Time/Retired	Grid	Points
1	1	(Brazil) Ayrton Senna	McLaren-Honda	77	1:53:33.251	1	9
2	2	(France) Alain Prost	McLaren-Honda	77	+ 52.529	2	6
3	8	(Italy) Stefano Modena	Brabham-Judd	76	+ 1 lap	8	4
4	21	(Italy) Alex Caffi	Dallara-Ford	75	+ 2 laps	9	3
5	4	(Italy) Michele Alboreto	Tyrrell-Ford	75	+ 2 laps	12	2
6	7	(United Kingdom) Martin Brundle	Brabham-Judd	75	+ 2 laps	4	1
7	10	(United States) Eddie Cheever	Arrows-Ford	75	+ 2 laps	20	
8	19	(Italy) Alessandro Nannini	Benetton-Ford	74	+ 3 laps	15	
9	3	(United Kingdom) Jonathan Palmer	Tyrrell-Ford	74	+ 3 laps	23	
10	5	(Belgium) Thierry Boutsen	Williams-Renault	74	+ 3 laps	3	
11	16	(Italy) Ivan Capelli	March-Judd	73	Engine	22	
12	25	(France) René Arnoux	Ligier-Ford	73	+ 4 laps	21	
13	22	(Italy) Andrea de Cesaris	Dallara-Ford	73	+ 4 laps	10	
14	20	(United Kingdom) Johnny Herbert	Benetton-Ford	73	+ 4 laps	24	
15	6	(Italy) Riccardo Patrese	Williams-Renault	73	+ 4 laps	7	
Ret	24	(Spain) Luis Pérez-Sala	Minardi-Ford	48	Overheating	26	
Ret	40	(Italy) Gabriele Tarquini	AGS-Ford	46	Electrical	13	
Ret	31	(Brazil) Roberto Moreno	Coloni-Ford	44	Gearbox	25	
Ret	30	(France) Philippe Alliot	Lola-Lamborghini	38	Engine	17	
Ret	15	(Brazil) Maurício Gugelmin	March-Judd	36	Engine	14	
Ret	11	(Brazil) Nelson Piquet	Lotus-Judd	32	Collision	19	
Ret	27	(United Kingdom) Nigel Mansell	Ferrari	30	Gearbox	5	
Ret	32	(France) Pierre-Henri Raphanel	Coloni-Ford	19	Gearbox	18	
Ret	26	(France) Olivier Grouillard	Ligier-Ford	4	Gearbox	16	
Ret	23	(Italy) Pierluigi Martini	Minardi-Ford	3	Clutch	11	
Ret	9	(United Kingdom) Derek Warwick	Arrows-Ford	2	Electrical	6	
DNQ	38	(Germany) Christian Danner	Rial-Ford				
DNQ	29	(France) Yannick Dalmas	Lola-Lamborghini				
DNQ	12	(Japan) Satoru Nakajima	Lotus-Judd				
DNPQ	18	(Italy) Piercarlo Ghinzani	Osella-Ford				
DNPQ	36	(Sweden) Stefan Johansson	Onyx-Ford				
DNPQ	17	(Italy) Nicola Larini	Osella-Ford				
DNPQ	34	(Germany) Bernd Schneider	Zakspeed-Yamaha				
DNPQ	37	(Belgium) Bertrand Gachot	Onyx-Ford				
DNPQ	33	(Switzerland) Gregor Foitek	EuroBrun-Judd				
DNPQ	39	(Germany) Volker Weidler	Rial-Ford				
DNPQ	35	(Japan) Aguri Suzuki	Zakspeed-Yamaha				
DNPQ	41	(Germany) Joachim Winkelhock	AGS-Ford				

== Championship standings after the race ==
Drivers' Championship standings

Pos	Driver	Points
1	(Brazil) Ayrton Senna	18
2	(France) Alain Prost	18
3	(United Kingdom) Nigel Mansell	9
4	(Italy) Alessandro Nannini	5
5	(Brazil) Maurício Gugelmin	4

Constructors' Championship standings

Pos	Constructor	Points
1	(United Kingdom) McLaren-Honda	36
2	(Italy) Ferrari	9
3	(United Kingdom) Benetton-Ford	8
4	(United Kingdom) Brabham-Judd	5
5	(United Kingdom) March-Judd	4

- Note: Only the top five positions are included for both sets of standings.

Previous race: 1989 San Marino Grand Prix	FIA Formula One World Championship; 1989 season	Next race: 1989 Mexican Grand Prix
Previous race: 1988 Monaco Grand Prix	Monaco Grand Prix	Next race: 1990 Monaco Grand Prix
