= Coloni C4 =

Coloni C4 Andrea Moda C4B
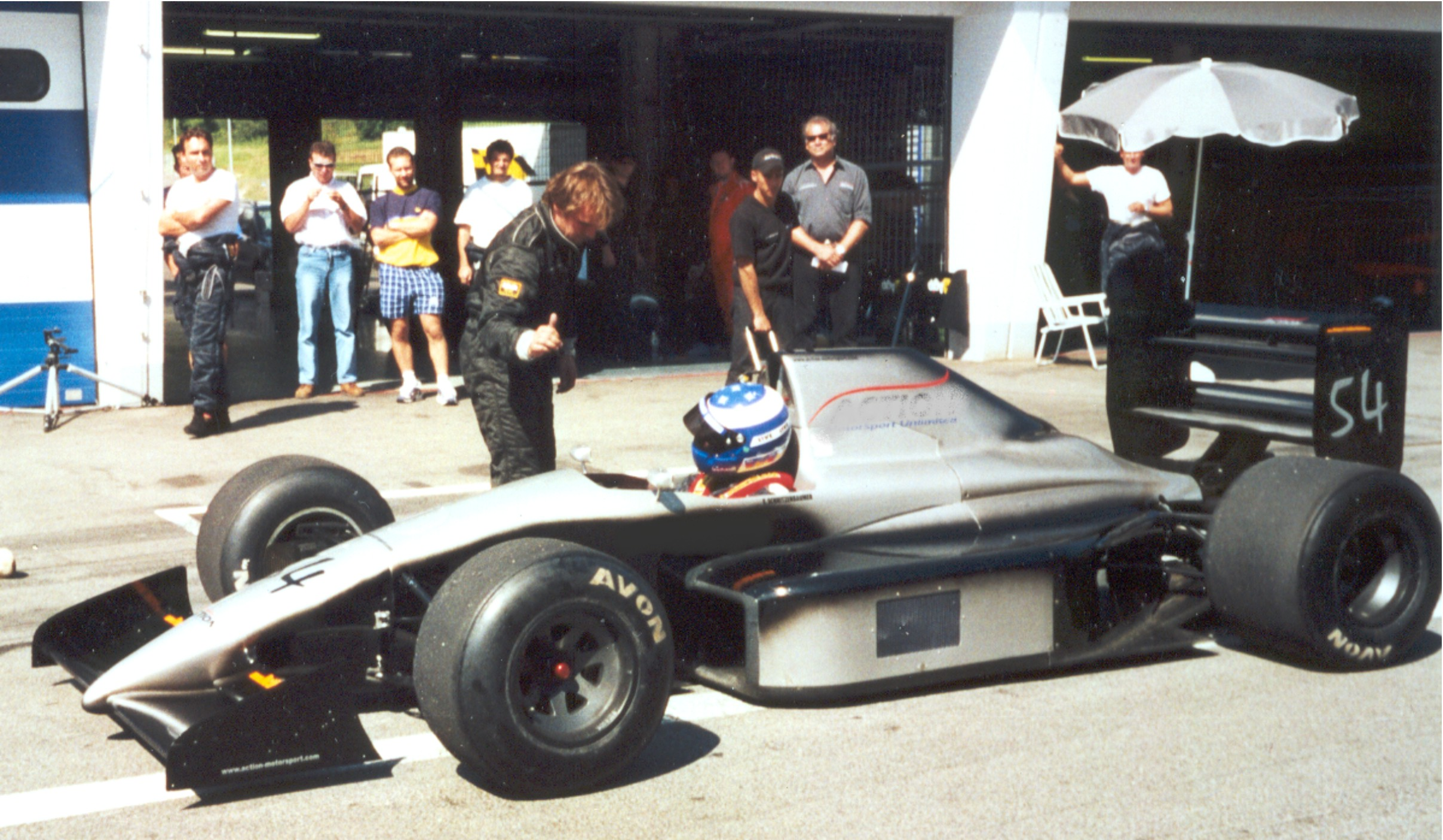
- Category: Formula One
- Constructor: Coloni
- Designers: Christian Vanderpleyn; Paul Burgess (Andrea Moda C4B only)
- Predecessor: Coloni C3
- Successor: Andrea Moda S921

Technical specifications
- Chassis: carbon fibre monocoque
- Suspension (front): Double wishbones, pushrods
- Suspension (rear): Double wishbones, pushrods
- Axle track: Front 1,810 mm (71 in); Rear 1,670 mm (66 in)
- Wheelbase: 2,850 mm (112 in)
- Engine: 1991: Ford DFR, 3,493 cc (213.2 cu in), 90° V8, NA, mid-engine, longitudinally mounted. 1992: Judd GV, 3,496 cc (213.3 cu in), 72° V10, NA, mid-engine, longitudinally mounted.
- Transmission: 1991: Coloni 6-speed Manual; 1992: Dallara 6-speed Manual
- Fuel: Agip
- Tyres: Goodyear

Competition history
- Notable entrants: Coloni Racing Srl; Andrea Moda Formula
- Notable drivers: (Portugal) Pedro Chaves (Japan) Naoki Hattori (Italy) Alex Caffi (Italy) Enrico Bertaggia
- Debut: 1991 United States Grand Prix
Races	Wins	Poles	F/Laps
16	0	0	0

The Coloni C4 is a Formula One car designed by Christian Vanderpleyn for the Coloni team for use in the 1991 Formula One season, although it never qualified for a race and was the slowest car in the field.

An evolution of the C4 was also briefly used by the Andrea Moda team in 1992 as the Andrea Moda C4B. The C4B made its only appearance at the season-opening South African Grand Prix, at which Andrea Moda Formula was excluded for not having paid the registration fee for the championship and for not having entered a car they had constructed themselves. The C4B was replaced by the S921 at the next Grand Prix in Mexico.

== Development ==
The C4 was an evolution of Coloni C3 or FC189 from 1989. For the 1991 season, Coloni entrusted the C3C to Perugia University students who developed the car. The C4 chassis differed from the C3 versions due to revised sidepods and a different air box.

The C4 used a Ford Cosworth DFR engine prepared by Langford & Peck for the first half of the season and later changed over to the Hart-prepared DFR. The Langford & Peck-prepared engine was significantly less powerful than the Hart.

Coloni wanted to hire Andrea de Cesaris (who had support of Marlboro), but after de Cesaris went to Jordan, Coloni decided to hire newcomer Pedro Chaves.

== Racing history ==
=== Coloni C4 (1991) ===
Chaves was scheduled to race for the full season but the Portuguese driver failed to pre-qualify for every race he entered. The car was out of date, fragile and hard to handle, and Chaves was relatively inexperienced. Along with four other teams, Coloni was forced to participate in pre-qualifying sessions early on Friday mornings, and Chaves was one of eight drivers taking part in those sessions. At the season-opening 1991 United States Grand Prix, Chaves posted a faster time than Olivier Grouillard and Eric van de Poele, but crashed into a tyre wall during the session. He outpaced only Grouillard in Brazil, and a broken gearbox left him slowest in San Marino. In Monaco he again had only Grouillard behind him, and he was slowest by nearly eight seconds in Canada, despite the new Brian Hart-prepared engine.

In Mexico, Chaves was again well off the pace and only Emanuele Pirro was slower, and the C4 was slowest in France, Great Britain, Germany and Hungary. In Belgium Chaves managed to post a faster time than Fabrizio Barbazza's AGS, but in Italy the poorly maintained Cosworth engine failed to start and Chaves could not post a time at all. The C4 was comfortably the slowest car at Chaves' home event in Portugal, and he finally quit the team through lack of mileage in the car and non-payment of his retainer.

As Chaves had refused to drive in Spain, Coloni had to find a new driver, so for the last two races of the season the team employed Japanese Formula Three champion Naoki Hattori to drive the C4. In Japan at his first Formula One event, Hattori was sixteen seconds slower than his nearest rival in the pre-qualifying session, and nearly five seconds slower than his nearest competitor in the season-ending event in Australia.

=== Andrea Moda C4B (1992) ===
In the summer of 1991, Coloni tried an unsuccessful indirect approach to Lamborghini in an attempt to persuade them to merge with the moribund Modena Team. In September 1991, the owner Enzo Coloni sold it for eight million dollars to Italian shoemaker Andrea Sassetti. The team retained the name Coloni Racing for the final two rounds of that season but was renamed Andrea Moda Formula in 1992.

At the beginning of 1992 Andrea Moda Formula used the C4, renaming it the Andrea Moda C4B, and it became the first Formula One car of the new team. Team owner Sassetti attempted to develop the C4 while waiting for the Andrea Moda S921, the finalisation of which was entrusted to the British engineering consultancy firm, Simtek, ready for the start of the European season in Spain.

The car was to be driven by Italian Alex Caffi, formerly of the Footwork Arrows team, and his compatriot Enrico Bertaggia, a driver in the Japanese Formula 3000 championship who had previously appeared in Formula One in 1989 with Coloni.

==== Differences between Coloni C4 and C4B ====
To improve the Coloni C4, Andrea Moda Formula concluded a partnership for the supply of engines with the British engine manufacturer Judd, who offered them the V10 GV blocks used in 1991 by the BMS Scuderia Italia for his Dallara 191. When the C4 was powered by a V8 Ford Cosworth DFR it developed 620 horsepower at 11,500 rpm while the Judd engine developed 750 horsepower at 13,500 rpm, and weighed 130 kilograms (290 lb), 25 kilograms (55 lb) less than the Cosworth block.

Moreover, Sassetti bought Scuderia Italia's rear suspension and the semi-automatic cross six-speed box of the Dallara 191. The front suspension and the base of the C4 frame were retained. In the first weeks of 1992, these used parts were fitted to the Coloni C4 by students of the University of Perugia, under the direction of Paul Burgess. At 530 kilograms (1,170 lb), the C4B was one of the heaviest cars in Formula One.

In early February 1992, Caffi tested the new C4B chassis at the Misano circuit in Italy.

==== 1992 South African Grand Prix ====
Andrea Moda brought the C4B to the inaugural event of the 1992 season, the South African Grand Prix, held between 28 February and 1 March 1992. On the Thursday before the Grand Prix, an exceptional day of testing was organized for the Grand Prix, which had not taken place since 1985 with the route of the Kyalami circuit substantially amended since. On Thursday morning, during the session in which a driver from each team had to take part, Caffi managed only half a lap before encountering a battery problem which ended his day; Bertaggia did not participate in the meeting as only one car was operational. A press release announced that Andrea Sassetti had sacked a mechanic after he worked on a second C4B chassis against his instructions. However, it was unlikely that two C4B chassis had been shipped to South Africa for the Grand Prix since there was only one Coloni C4 from which only one C4B can evolve. However, the Zurich-based magazine Motorsport Aktuell reported that Andrea Moda had taken a second unassembled C4B to South Africa. This hypothetical chassis, if it did exist, may have been an adaptation of the Coloni FC189B.

Before the pre-qualifying session, FISA conducted technical inspections of all cars involved which led to a regulatory issue. If the stewards had found that the Andrea Moda C4B simply remained very similar to the Coloni C4 used by Coloni in 1991 (the only significant difference between the two chassis being the rear suspension system), they would have declared the car complied with the regulations. However, the governing body of Formula One found that the company that Sassetti bought from Coloni was not the one which constructed World Championship cars. Andrea Moda could thus no longer claim to be the continuation of the Coloni team, but a new team; in this case, their cars were no longer consistent with the regulations since the "Concorde Agreement" stipulated that a new team must use an original chassis. FISA therefore decided to exclude Andrea Moda Formula from the World Championship.

Sassetti, however, maintained that his team should be considered the successor of Coloni and not a newcomer to the sport (so that they could legally use an old chassis and not pay the registration fees to FISA). Since they had not paid the enrolment deposit of 100,000 dollars requested from a new team, FISA maintained that Sassetti was the founder of a new team because it had bought the old cars and equipment of Enzo Coloni but had not yet purchased its right to participate in the World Championship.

Two days after the exclusion in South Africa and having initially considered closing his team operation, Sassetti at last came to an agreement with FISA. Subsequently, FISA declared that Andrea Moda Formula, which eventually paid the deposit, would be allowed to participate in the Formula One World Championship but would have to use an original chassis. The following week, FISA announced that if Andrea Moda came to Mexico with two new cars that met the regulations, the team would be reinstated in the Championship.

Sassetti then asked Simtek, which was preparing the upcoming Andrea Moda S921, to accelerate its work to develop the new car so that it could be entered in the Mexican Grand Prix. This was to be held three weeks after the South African round and the team otherwise faced a fine from FISA for non-presentation of its cars in the early races of the season.

== Complete Formula One results ==
(key)

Year	Entrant	Engine	Tyres	Drivers	1	2	3	4	5	6	7	8	9	10	11	12	13	14	15	16	Points	WCC
1991	Coloni Racing Srl	Ford DFR; V8	G		USA	BRA	SMR	MON	CAN	MEX	FRA	GBR	GER	HUN	BEL	ITA	POR	ESP	JPN	AUS	0	NC
1991	Coloni Racing Srl	Ford DFR; V8	G	Pedro Chaves	DNPQ	DNPQ	DNPQ	DNPQ	DNPQ	DNPQ	DNPQ	DNPQ	DNPQ	DNPQ	DNPQ	DNPQ	DNPQ				0	NC
1991	Coloni Racing Srl	Ford DFR; V8	G	Naoki Hattori															DNPQ	DNPQ	0	NC
1992	Andrea Moda Formula	Judd GV; V10	G		RSA	MEX	BRA	ESP	SMR	MON	CAN	FRA	GBR	GER	HUN	BEL	ITA	POR	JPN	AUS	0	NC
1992	Andrea Moda Formula	Judd GV; V10	G	Alex Caffi	EX																0	NC
1992	Andrea Moda Formula	Judd GV; V10	G	Enrico Bertaggia	EX																0	NC
