= Enrico Bertaggia =

Italian racing driver (born 1964)

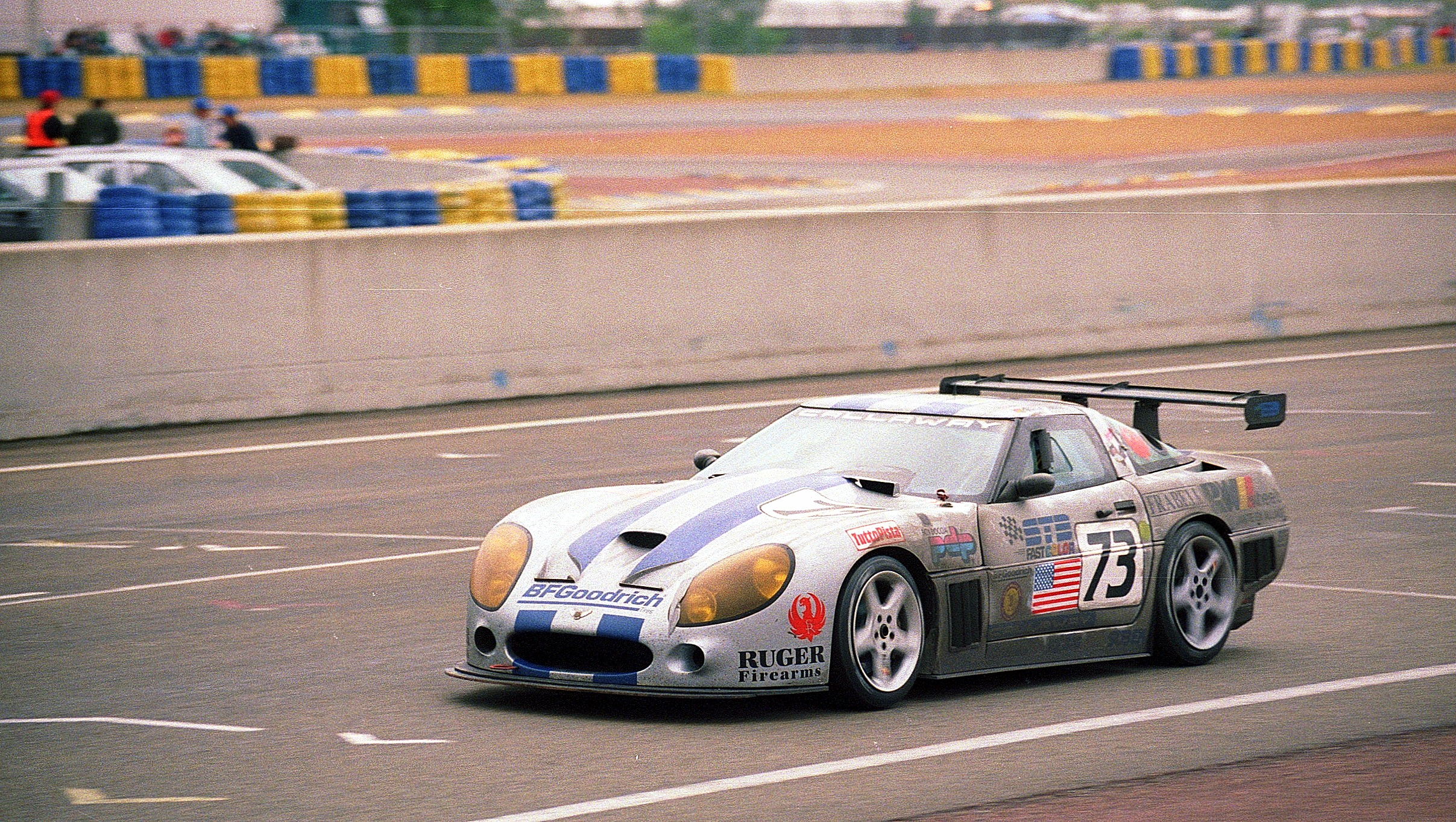
- Bertaggia at the 1995 24 Hours of Le Mans
- Born: Enrico Agostino Bertaggia; 19 September 1964 (age 62); Noale, Veneto, Italy

Formula One World Championship career
- Nationality: (Italy) Italian
- Active years: 1989, 1992
- Team(s): Coloni, Andrea Moda
- Entries: 8 (0 starts)
- Championships: 0
- Wins: 0
- Podiums: 0
- Career points: 0
- Pole positions: 0
- Fastest laps: 0
- First entry: 1989 Belgian Grand Prix
- Last entry: 1989 Australian Grand Prix

24 Hours of Le Mans career
- Years: 1995
- Teams: Callaway
- Best finish: 9th (1995)
- Class wins: 0

Enrico Agostino Bertaggia (born 19 September 1964) is an Italian former racing driver, who competed in Formula One at eight Grands Prix in 1989 and 1992.

Bertaggia enjoyed success in Formula Three, winning the Italian Formula Three Championship in 1987 and the Monaco Grand Prix F3 support race and the Macau Grand Prix the following year.

== Racing career ==
Enrico Agostino Bertaggia was born on 19 September 1964 in Noale, Veneto, Italy.

As a professional race car driver, Bertaggia began his career in 1982 and continued for almost 25 years. He entered many prestigious and difficult Championship Races including Formula 3 where he was the Italian Formula 3 Champion in 1987, and in 1988, when he succeeded in the feat of winning both the Formula 3 race in Monte Carlo and the Macau Grand Prix with Damon Hill coming in second and Jean Alesi in third position. He made his debut in Formula 3000 in 1988. In the 1988 International Formula 3000 Championship, he was entered in four races, failed to qualify in the first three and then managed a "career-best" 19th position at Jerez.

In 1989, Bertaggia obtained a Formula One ride with Coloni, replacing Pierre-Henri Raphanel. He participated in six races towards the end of the season and was in fact the slowest entrant in all six. He was entered for two Grand Prix with Andrea Moda in 1992, but the team was excluded from the first, and withdrew from the second, following which Bertaggia left the team. He made an attempt to return to Andrea Moda with a new sponsorship deal, but owner Andrea Sassetti had already used up his allowed number of driver changes.

In 1990 and 1991, Bertaggia raced Formula 3000 in Japan with the Footwork team. In 1995, he was runner up at the 24 Hours of Le Mans in the GT2 class with Callaway Corvette.

Bertaggia's career continued and included Super Touring Car Championships, Porsche Carrera Cup and Sportscar Racing.

== Business ventures ==
In 2011, Bertaggia moved to the United States to create Dream Racing, a driving experience based at the Las Vegas Motor Speedway.

== Racing record ==
=== Complete International Formula 3000 results ===
(key) (Races in bold indicate pole position) (Races in italics indicate fastest lap)

| Year | Entrant | Chassis | Engine | 1 | 2 | 3 | 4 | 5 | 6 | 7 | 8 | 9 | 10 | 11 | DC | Points |
|---|---|---|---|---|---|---|---|---|---|---|---|---|---|---|---|---|
| 1988 | Forti Corse | Dallara 3087 | Cosworth | JER; DNQ | VAL; DNQ | PAU; DNQ | SIL; DNQ | MNZ; 7 | PER; 16 | BRH; DNS | BIR; DNQ | BUG; DNQ | | | NC | 0 |
| 1988 | Forti Corse | Lola T88/50 | Cosworth | | | | | | | | | | ZOL; 11 | DIJ; Ret | NC | 0 |
| 1989 | Lola Motorsport | March 88B | Judd | SIL; DNQ | | | | | | | | | | | NC | 0 |
| 1989 | Roger Cowman Racing | Lola T89/50 | Cosworth | | VAL; DNQ | PAU; DNQ | JER; 19 | PER | BRH | BIR | SPA | BUG | DIJ | | NC | 0 |
| 1993 | ACE Racing | Reynard 92D | Ford Cosworth | DON | SIL | PAU; DNQ | PER; 5 | HOC; DNQ | NÜR; 20 | SPA; Ret | MAG; Ret | NOG; 12 | | | 17th | 2 |

=== Complete Formula One results ===
(key)

| Year | Entrant | Chassis | Engine | 1 | 2 | 3 | 4 | 5 | 6 | 7 | 8 | 9 | 10 | 11 | 12 | 13 | 14 | 15 | 16 | WDC | Pts |
|---|---|---|---|---|---|---|---|---|---|---|---|---|---|---|---|---|---|---|---|---|---|
| 1989 | Coloni SpA | Coloni C3 | Ford Cosworth DFR 3.5 V8 | BRA | SMR | MON | MEX | USA | CAN | FRA | GBR | GER | HUN | BEL; DNPQ | ITA; DNPQ | POR; DNPQ | ESP; DNPQ | JPN; DNPQ | AUS; DNPQ | NC | 0 |
| 1992 | Andrea Moda Formula | Andrea Moda C4B | Judd GV 3.5 V10 | RSA; EX | | | | | | | | | | | | | | | | NC | 0 |
| 1992 | Andrea Moda Formula | Andrea Moda S921 | Judd GV 3.5 V10 | | MEX; DNP | BRA | ESP | SMR | MON | CAN | FRA | GBR | GER | HUN | BEL | ITA | POR | JPN | AUS | NC | 0 |

=== Complete Japanese Formula 3000 Championship results ===
(key) (Races in bold indicate pole position) (Races in italics indicate fastest lap)

| Year | Team | 1 | 2 | 3 | 4 | 5 | 6 | 7 | 8 | 9 | 10 | 11 | DC | Pts |
|---|---|---|---|---|---|---|---|---|---|---|---|---|---|---|
| 1990 | Footwork Formula | SUZ; 14 | FSW; 11 | MIN; 3 | SUZ; Ret | SUG; 16 | FSW; 13 | FSW; Ret | SUZ; Ret | FSW; 14 | SUZ; 7 | | 14th | 4 |
| 1991 | Footwork Formula | SUZ; DNQ | AUT; 16 | FSW; 21 | MIN; 16 | SUZ | SUG | FSW | SUZ | FSW | SUZ | FSW | NC | 0 |

=== Complete British Formula Two Championship results ===
(key) (Races in bold indicate pole position) (Races in italics indicate fastest lap)

| Year | Team | Chassis | Engine | 1 | 2 | 3 | 4 | 5 | 6 | 7 | 8 | 9 | 10 | DC | Pts |
|---|---|---|---|---|---|---|---|---|---|---|---|---|---|---|---|
| 1992 | CoBRa Motorsport | Renard 92D | Cosworth | OUL | DON | BRH | THR | BRH | OUL | SNE | BRH; 4 | SIL; 1 | DON; Ret | 7th | 12 |
| 1993 | Durango Corse | Renard 92D | Cosworth | OUL; 2 | SIL; Ret | BHI; 5 | DON | OUL | BHI | SNE | BGP | THR | DON | 9th | 8 |

=== Complete Italian Superturismo Championship results ===
(key) (Races in bold indicate pole position) (Races in italics indicate fastest lap)

| Year | Team | Car | 1 | 2 | 3 | 4 | 5 | 6 | 7 | 8 | 9 | 10 | 11 | 12 | 13 | 14 | 15 | 16 | 17 | 18 | 19 | 20 | Pos. | Pts |
|---|---|---|---|---|---|---|---|---|---|---|---|---|---|---|---|---|---|---|---|---|---|---|---|---|
| 1994 | Top Run | Alfa Romeo 155 | MNZ; 1 Ret | MNZ; 2 DNS | VAL; 1; 8 | VAL; 2 Ret | MAG; 1; 12 | MAG; 2; 8 | BIN; 1 | BIN; 2 | MIS; 1 | MIS; 2 | VAL; 1 | VAL; 2 | MUG; 1 | MUG; 2 | PER; 1 | PER; 2 | VAR; 1 | VAR; 2 | MUG; 1 | MUG; 2 | 22nd | 6 |

=== Complete Super Tourenwagen Cup results ===
(key) (Races in bold indicate pole position) (Races in italics indicate fastest lap)

| Year | Team | Car | 1 | 2 | 3 | 4 | 5 | 6 | 7 | 8 | 9 | 10 | 11 | 12 | 13 | 14 | 15 | 16 | Pos. | Pts |
|---|---|---|---|---|---|---|---|---|---|---|---|---|---|---|---|---|---|---|---|---|
| 1995 | Ford Mondeo Team Wolf | Ford Mondeo | ZOL; 1 | ZOL; 2 | SPA; 1 | SPA; 2 | ÖST; 1 | ÖST; 2 | HOC; 1 | HOC; 2 | NÜR; 1 | NÜR; 2 | SAL; 1; 19 | SAL; 2 Ret | AVU; 1 Ret | AVU; 2 DNS | NÜR; 1; 21 | NÜR; 2; 14 | 33rd | 16 |

=== 24 Hours of Le Mans results ===
| Year | Team | Co-drivers | Car | Class | Laps | Pos. | Class pos. |
|---|---|---|---|---|---|---|---|
| 1995 | (United States) Callaway Competition | (Germany) Frank Jelinski (United States) Johnny Unser | Callaway Corvette | LMGT2 | 273 | 9th | **2nd** |

Sporting positions
| Preceded by Nicola Larini | Italian Formula Three Champion; 1987 | Succeeded by Emanuele Naspetti |
| Preceded by Didier Artzet | Monaco Formula Three; Race Winner; 1988 | Succeeded by Antonio Tamburini |
| Preceded by Martin Donnelly | Macau Grand Prix; Winner; 1988 | Succeeded by David Brabham |
