= Andrea Moda S921 =

Formula One car

- Category: Formula One
- Constructor: Andrea Moda Formula
- Designers: Nick Wirth (Technical Director); Michel Costa (Chief Designer)
- Predecessor: Andrea Moda C4B

Technical specifications
- Chassis: Carbon fibre Monocoque
- Suspension (front): Double wishbones, pushrods
- Axle track: Front 1810mm Rear 1670mm
- Wheelbase: 2850mm
- Engine: Judd GV 3496cc V10 engine (72°) Normally Aspirated
- Transmission: Dallara 6-speed Manual
- Weight: 505kg
- Fuel: Agip
- Tyres: Goodyear

Competition history
- Notable entrants: Andrea Moda Formula
- Notable drivers: 34. (Brazil) Roberto Moreno; 35. (United Kingdom) Perry McCarthy
- Debut: 1992 Brazilian Grand Prix
Races	Wins	Poles	F/Laps
10	0	0	0

The Andrea Moda S921 was a Formula One car designed by Simtek and used by the Andrea Moda Formula team in the 1992 Formula One World Championship. It was driven by the experienced Brazilian Roberto Moreno and Englishman Perry McCarthy.

== Overview ==
=== Development ===
The plans for the car had been purchased from Nick Wirth's Simtek Research, who had originally designed the machine in 1990 for BMW's proposed entry into Formula 1. The design was then revived and updated; two chassis were built for Moreno and McCarthy.

=== Racing history ===
The car was highly unsuccessful and its best result was at the 1992 Monaco Grand Prix; Moreno managed to get through the Friday pre-qualifying session, and then qualified in 26th place for the race. Moreno then managed to climb as high as 19th before retiring on lap 11 due to engine failure.

The team was expelled from the championship after team owner Andrea Sassetti was arrested at Spa for financial irregularities, and following an FIA ruling following the arrest that the team was not run "in a manner compatible with the standards of the championship or in any way brings the championship into disrepute." The team did still turn up at Monza for the next Grand Prix but was banned from entering the paddock.

The team finished last in the Constructors' Championship, with no points.

== Complete Formula One results ==
(key) (results in bold indicate pole position, results in italics indicate fastest lap)

Year	Entrant	Engine	Tyres	Drivers	1	2	3	4	5	6	7	8	9	10	11	12	13	14	15	16	Points	WCC
1992	Andrea Moda Formula	Judd GV V10	**G**		RSA	MEX	BRA	ESP	SMR	MON	CAN	FRA	GBR	GER	HUN	BEL	ITA	POR	JPN	AUS	**0**	**NC**
1992	Andrea Moda Formula	Judd GV V10	**G**	Roberto Moreno			DNPQ	DNPQ	DNPQ	Ret	DNPQ	DNA	DNPQ	DNPQ	DNQ	DNQ	DNP				**0**	**NC**
1992	Andrea Moda Formula	Judd GV V10	**G**	Perry McCarthy			DNP	DNPQ	DNPQ	DNPQ	DNP	DNA	DNPQ	EX	DNPQ	DNQ	DNP				**0**	**NC**
