= 1992 Mexican Grand Prix =

- Race 2 of 16 in the 1992 Formula One World Championship

Race details
- Date: 22 March 1992
- Official name: XVI Gran Premio de México
- Location: Autódromo Hermanos Rodríguez; Mexico City, Mexico
- Course: Permanent racing facility
- Course length: 4.421 km (2.747 miles)
- Distance: 69 laps, 305.049 km (189.549 miles)
- Weather: Scattered clouds 27 °C (81 °F)

Pole position
Driver	(United Kingdom) Nigel Mansell	Williams-Renault
- Time: 1:16.346

Fastest lap
Driver	(Austria) Gerhard Berger	McLaren-Honda
- Time: 1:17.711 on lap 60

Podium
First	(United Kingdom) Nigel Mansell	Williams-Renault
Second	(Italy) Riccardo Patrese	Williams-Renault
Third	(Germany) Michael Schumacher	Benetton-Ford

The 1992 Mexican Grand Prix was a Formula One motor race held at Autódromo Hermanos Rodríguez in Mexico City on 22 March 1992. It was the second race of the 1992 Formula One World Championship.

The 69-lap race was won from pole position by British driver Nigel Mansell, driving a Williams-Renault. Italian teammate Riccardo Patrese finished second, with Michael Schumacher third in a Benetton-Ford, the first of an eventual 155 podiums for the German driver (and also the first podium for a German driver since the Jochen Mass's third place in the 1977 Canadian Grand Prix).

The Hermanos Rodríguez circuit had a reputation for being very bumpy, and by this point the condition of the track had deteriorated even further; the perceived decline of Mexico City itself with increasing crowding and pollution problems arguably made the event look bad for Formula One's glamorous image at the time. This was the final Formula One race in Mexico until 2015, when the Grand Prix was revived on a revised Hermanos Rodríguez circuit.

== Pre-race ==
On 20 February 1992 Mexico city officials put out a smog alert due to the dangerous air pollution levels in the city. Alerts mandated restrictions on operating heavy motorized equipment. The Mexican Grand Prix committee had to delay work paving sections of the track.

The planned pre-qualifying session was again cancelled, as it had been in South Africa, where the Andrea Moda team was excluded from the event due to non-payment of the $100,000 guarantee required for new teams. With the guarantee now paid, FISA clarified that if Andrea Moda came to Mexico with two new cars that met the regulations, the team would be reinstated in the Championship. Therefore team owner Andrea Sassetti abandoned the C4B car with its Coloni origins, and brought forward the introduction of their new car, the Simtek-designed Andrea Moda S921, which was originally intended for the fourth round in Spain. The team brought two hastily built S921s for Alex Caffi and Enrico Bertaggia, but the cars could not be made ready in time for pre-qualifying. Sassetti withdrew his cars, citing "freight delays" as extenuating circumstances. With only four cars remaining in the pre-qualifying pool, the session was cancelled.

== Qualifying ==
=== Qualifying report ===
During the Friday qualifying session, Ayrton Senna hit one of the bumps in the Esses, lost control of his McLaren, and crashed into a perimeter wall at 150 mph (240 km/h). He suffered whiplash and a severely bruised leg, and did not take any further part in this session, but was deemed fit enough to participate in the Saturday session.

Nigel Mansell took pole position in his Williams-Renault by 0.016 seconds from teammate Riccardo Patrese. The Benettons of Michael Schumacher and Martin Brundle made up the second row of the grid, though Schumacher's time was over 0.9 seconds slower than those of the Williams and Brundle's time was nearly 1.3 seconds slower than Schumacher's. The McLarens made up the third row, Gerhard Berger ahead of a still-sore Senna. The Dallaras impressed with JJ Lehto seventh and Pierluigi Martini ninth; between them was Maurício Gugelmin in the Jordan. Jean Alesi completed the top ten in his Ferrari; his teammate Ivan Capelli could only manage 20th.

The four non-qualifiers were Aguri Suzuki in the Footwork, Paul Belmondo in the March, and the two Brabhams of Eric van de Poele and Giovanna Amati. This was the first time in the Brabham team's history that neither of its cars had qualified.

=== Qualifying classification ===
Pos	No	Driver	Constructor	Q1	Q2	Gap
1	5	(United Kingdom) Nigel Mansell	Williams-Renault	1:16.346	1:16.648	
2	6	(Italy) Riccardo Patrese	Williams-Renault	1:17.908	1:16.362	+0.016
3	19	(Germany) Michael Schumacher	Benetton-Ford	1:17.554	1:17.292	+0.946
4	20	(United Kingdom) Martin Brundle	Benetton-Ford	1:18.937	1:18.588	+2.242
5	2	(Austria) Gerhard Berger	McLaren-Honda	1:18.604	1:18.589	+2.243
6	1	(Brazil) Ayrton Senna	McLaren-Honda	1:23.063	1:18.791	+2.445
7	21	(Finland) JJ Lehto	Dallara-Ferrari	1:19.982	1:19.111	+2.765
8	33	(Brazil) Maurício Gugelmin	Jordan-Yamaha	1:20.246	1:19.355	+3.009
9	22	(Italy) Pierluigi Martini	Dallara-Ferrari	1:19.767	1:19.378	+3.032
10	27	(France) Jean Alesi	Ferrari	1:21.434	1:19.417	+3.071
11	4	(Italy) Andrea de Cesaris	Tyrrell-Ilmor	1:19.423	1:24.117	+3.077
12	12	(United Kingdom) Johnny Herbert	Lotus-Ford	1:20.450	1:19.509	+3.163
13	29	(France) Bertrand Gachot	Venturi-Lamborghini	1:21.656	1:19.743	+3.397
14	15	(Italy) Gabriele Tarquini	Fondmetal-Ford	1:20.386	1:19.769	+3.423
15	32	(Italy) Stefano Modena	Jordan-Yamaha	1:19.957	1:20.469	+3.611
16	3	(France) Olivier Grouillard	Tyrrell-Ilmor	1:20.709	1:19.961	+3.615
17	23	(Brazil) Christian Fittipaldi	Minardi-Lamborghini	1:20.042	1:20.202	+3.696
18	11	(Finland) Mika Häkkinen	Lotus-Ford	1:20.145	1:20.390	+3.799
19	16	(Austria) Karl Wendlinger	March-Ilmor	47:56.613	1:20.200	+3.854
20	28	(Italy) Ivan Capelli	Ferrari	1:20.223	1:21.120	+3.877
21	24	(Italy) Gianni Morbidelli	Minardi-Lamborghini	1:21.019	1:20.227	+3.881
22	25	(Belgium) Thierry Boutsen	Ligier-Renault	1:20.709	1:20.395	+4.049
23	14	(Switzerland) Andrea Chiesa	Fondmetal-Ford	1:21.902	1:20.845	+4.499
24	30	(Japan) Ukyo Katayama	Venturi-Lamborghini	1:22.188	1:20.935	+4.589
25	9	(Italy) Michele Alboreto	Footwork-Mugen-Honda	1:21.396	1:21.064	+4.718
26	26	(France) Érik Comas	Ligier-Renault	1:21.122	1:21.963	+4.776
27	10	(Japan) Aguri Suzuki	Footwork-Mugen-Honda	1:21.617	1:21.187	+4.841
28	17	(France) Paul Belmondo	March-Ilmor	1:23.508	1:21.504	+5.158
29	7	(Belgium) Eric van de Poele	Brabham-Judd	1:22.937	1:22.197	+5.851
30	8	(Italy) Giovanna Amati	Brabham-Judd	no time	1:25.052	+8.706

== Race ==
=== Race report ===
Stefano Modena, having qualified 15th in the other Jordan, had to start the race from the pit lane.

Nigel Mansell dominated the race straight from the pole position, finishing the race 12 seconds ahead of Patrese and 21 seconds ahead of Michael Schumacher. Senna's transmission broke on the 11th lap, ending his race prematurely; teammate Berger finished 4th, salvaging some pride for McLaren in the farewell race for the MP4/6. Gerhard Berger managed to get ahead of Martin Brundle with a battle that managed to last for eight laps until Brundle was able to move back up to fourth on lap 44 but soon retired with engine trouble on lap 47, ending the battle for fourth. At the front, Mansell won with Patrese making it a Williams 1–2 again ahead of Schumacher, Berger, de Cesaris and Mika Häkkinen scoring the final point for Lotus for the second race in succession from South Africa and respectively the Finn's first point of the season.

=== Race classification ===
Pos	No	Driver	Constructor	Laps	Time/Retired	Grid	Points
1	5	(United Kingdom) Nigel Mansell	Williams-Renault	69	1:31:53.587	1	10
2	6	(Italy) Riccardo Patrese	Williams-Renault	69	+ 12.971	2	6
3	19	(Germany) Michael Schumacher	Benetton-Ford	69	+ 21.429	3	4
4	2	(Austria) Gerhard Berger	McLaren-Honda	69	+ 33.347	5	3
5	4	(Italy) Andrea de Cesaris	Tyrrell-Ilmor	68	+ 1 lap	11	2
6	11	(Finland) Mika Häkkinen	Lotus-Ford	68	+ 1 lap	18	1
7	12	(United Kingdom) Johnny Herbert	Lotus-Ford	68	+ 1 lap	12	
8	21	(Finland) JJ Lehto	Dallara-Ferrari	68	+ 1 lap	7	
9	26	(France) Érik Comas	Ligier-Renault	67	+ 2 laps	26	
10	25	(Belgium) Thierry Boutsen	Ligier-Renault	67	+ 2 laps	22	
11	29	(France) Bertrand Gachot	Venturi-Lamborghini	66	+ 3 laps	13	
12	30	(Japan) Ukyo Katayama	Venturi-Lamborghini	66	+ 3 laps	24	
13	9	(Italy) Michele Alboreto	Footwork-Mugen-Honda	65	+ 4 laps	25	
Ret	20	(United Kingdom) Martin Brundle	Benetton-Ford	47	Engine	4	
Ret	15	(Italy) Gabriele Tarquini	Fondmetal-Ford	45	Clutch	14	
Ret	14	(Switzerland) Andrea Chiesa	Fondmetal-Ford	37	Spun off	23	
Ret	22	(Italy) Pierluigi Martini	Dallara-Ferrari	36	Handling	9	
Ret	27	(France) Jean Alesi	Ferrari	31	Engine	10	
Ret	24	(Italy) Gianni Morbidelli	Minardi-Lamborghini	29	Spun off	21	
Ret	32	(Italy) Stefano Modena	Jordan-Yamaha	17	Gearbox	15	
Ret	3	(France) Olivier Grouillard	Tyrrell-Ilmor	12	Engine	16	
Ret	1	(Brazil) Ayrton Senna	McLaren-Honda	11	Transmission	6	
Ret	23	(Brazil) Christian Fittipaldi	Minardi-Lamborghini	2	Spun off	17	
Ret	33	(Brazil) Maurício Gugelmin	Jordan-Yamaha	0	Engine	8	
Ret	16	(Austria) Karl Wendlinger	March-Ilmor	0	Collision	19	
Ret	28	(Italy) Ivan Capelli	Ferrari	0	Collision	20	
DNQ	10	(Japan) Aguri Suzuki	Footwork-Mugen-Honda				
DNQ	17	(France) Paul Belmondo	March-Ilmor				
DNQ	7	(Belgium) Eric van de Poele	Brabham-Judd				
DNQ	8	(Italy) Giovanna Amati	Brabham-Judd				

== Championship standings after the race ==
Drivers' Championship standings

	Pos	Driver	Points
	1	(United Kingdom) Nigel Mansell	20
	2	(Italy) Riccardo Patrese	12
1	3	(Germany) Michael Schumacher	7
1	4	(Austria) Gerhard Berger	5
2	5	(Brazil) Ayrton Senna	4

Constructors' Championship standings

	Pos	Constructor	Points
	1	(United Kingdom) Williams-Renault	32
	2	(United Kingdom) McLaren-Honda	9
	3	(United Kingdom) Benetton-Ford	7
6	4	(United Kingdom) Tyrrell-Ilmor	2
1	5	(United Kingdom) Lotus-Ford	2

- Note: Only the top five positions are included for both sets of standings.

Previous race: 1992 South African Grand Prix	FIA Formula One World Championship; 1992 season	Next race: 1992 Brazilian Grand Prix
Previous race: 1991 Mexican Grand Prix	Mexican Grand Prix	Next race: 2015 Mexican Grand Prix
