= 1992 South African Grand Prix =

Formula One motor race

- Race 1 of 16 in the 1992 Formula One World Championship
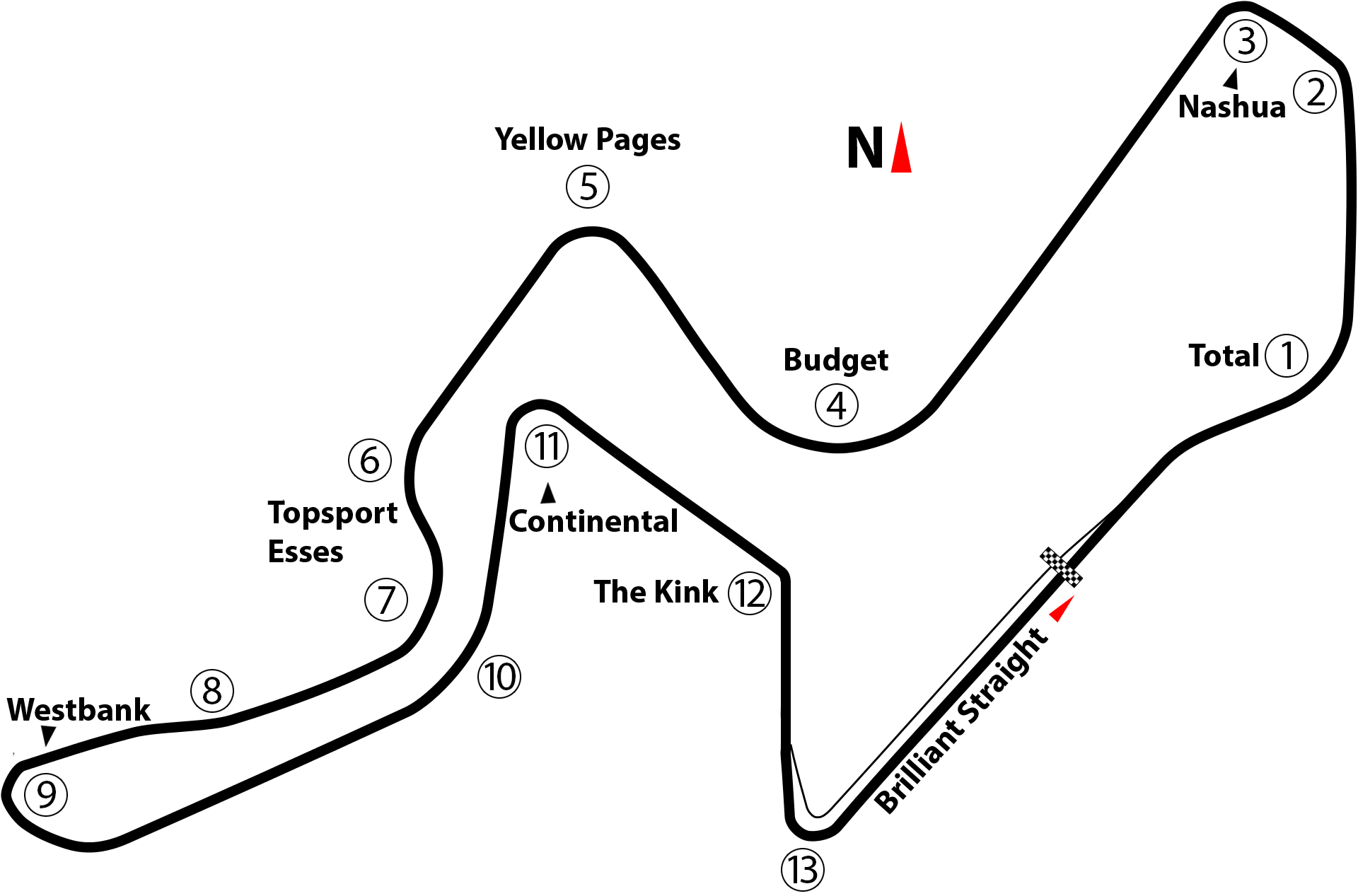
- Circuit Kyalami in South Africa

Race details
- Date: 1 March 1992
- Official name: Yellow Pages South African Grand Prix
- Location: Kyalami; Midrand, Transvaal Province, South Africa
- Course: Permanent racing facility
- Course length: 4.261 km (2.648 miles)
- Distance: 72 laps, 306.792 km (190.632 miles)
- Weather: Hot, dry and dull

Pole position
Driver	(United Kingdom) Nigel Mansell	Williams-Renault
- Time: 1:15.486

Fastest lap
Driver	(United Kingdom) Nigel Mansell	Williams-Renault
- Time: 1:17.578 on lap 70

Podium
First	(United Kingdom) Nigel Mansell	Williams-Renault
Second	(Italy) Riccardo Patrese	Williams-Renault
Third	(Brazil) Ayrton Senna	McLaren-Honda

The 1992 South African Grand Prix was a Formula One motor race held at the Kyalami circuit in Midrand, South Africa on 1 March 1992. It was the opening round of the 1992 Formula One World Championship and was contested over 72 laps. It was the 32nd South African Grand Prix, and the 22nd as part of the World Championship. Nigel Mansell dominated the weekend in his Williams-Renault, taking pole position, fastest lap and leading every lap of the race en route to victory for the second time in his career. Mansell's teammate, Riccardo Patrese, asserted the dominance of the car by completing a 1–2 finish. Ayrton Senna completed the podium for the McLaren team.

This was the first post-apartheid South African Grand Prix, the last running of the race having been in 1985 (also won by Mansell driving a Williams, but with a Honda turbo-engine) during Premier P. W. Botha's state of emergency. It was held on a revised Kyalami circuit, which used only a small part of the old layout.

== Pre-race ==
As the revised Kyalami circuit was new to the Formula One calendar, there were two acclimatization sessions held on the Thursday before the Grand Prix weekend. A pre-qualifying session was to be held on Friday morning to eliminate two cars, allowing the other thirty to take part in the main qualifying sessions on Friday afternoon and Saturday.

The entrants required to take part in pre-qualifying included the Larrousse team with their new Venturi LC92 chassis, driven by Bertrand Gachot, who had driven for the team in the season-ending 1991 Australian Grand Prix after losing his seat at Jordan; and the reigning Japanese Formula 3000 champion Ukyo Katayama. Also due to take part were one car from each of the Fondmetal and Footwork teams. They had chosen Swiss debutant Andrea Chiesa and Italian veteran Michele Alboreto respectively. The other two cars taking part were from the new Andrea Moda team.

The Andrea Moda fashion company, owned by Andrea Sassetti, had bought the Coloni team, which had failed to pre-qualify at every race of the 1991 season. They had signed ex-Footwork driver Alex Caffi, and Enrico Bertaggia, who had driven for Coloni during the 1989 season, and had brought the Judd-engined Andrea Moda C4B to South Africa. This car was an adaptation of last season's Cosworth-powered Coloni C4. Caffi drove in the second of Thursday's acclimatization sessions, although the car's battery failed on the first lap. Bertaggia did not run, and it was unclear if a second C4B had been built, or brought to Kyalami. However, a stewards' meeting on Thursday afternoon ruled that Andrea Moda was a new team, not a continuation of Coloni, and were therefore liable to pay a $100,000 guarantee according to Article 41 of the Formula One Sporting Regulations. The stewards also noted the C4 cars were originally built, and had been raced, by another constructor, i.e. Coloni, not Andrea Moda, thus the cars were likely to be ineligible, as a new team must use an original chassis. In any case, failure to pay the guarantee meant exclusion from the event.

Sassetti believed that he did not have to pay the guarantee for new teams as he had purchased an existing team, but officials decided that he had not purchased Coloni's entry into Formula One, or the constructor itself, only its cars and facilities. Sassetti lodged an appeal, citing the fact that several other teams, such as March, Fondmetal and Footwork had not been required to pay the guarantee when the teams changed hands. In any case, Andrea Moda's exclusion meant that pre-qualifying was cancelled.

== Qualifying ==
=== Qualifying report ===
Mansell took pole position with a time almost three-quarters of a second faster than that of Senna in second, and over a second and a half faster than that of his teammate Patrese, who was fourth. Berger was third in the other McLaren, nearly half a second slower than teammate Senna but over three-tenths of a second faster than Patrese. Jean Alesi was fifth in his Ferrari, and was the only other driver within two seconds of Mansell's time. Michael Schumacher was sixth in his Benetton, followed by Karl Wendlinger in the March, who in turn was ahead of Martin Brundle in the second Benetton and Ivan Capelli in the second Ferrari. Andrea de Cesaris completed the top ten in his Tyrrell.

Three of the five debutants failed to qualify: Paul Belmondo in the second March, Andrea Chiesa in the Fondmetal, and Giovanna Amati, the first female F1 driver in over a decade, in the Brabham. They were joined by Stefano Modena in the Jordan, whose Yamaha engine suffered reliability problems. Of the other two debutants, Katayama was 18th in the Venturi Larrousse and Christian Fittipaldi 20th in the Minardi.

=== Qualifying classification ===
Pos	No	Driver	Constructor	Q1	Q2	Gap
1	5	(United Kingdom) Nigel Mansell	Williams-Renault	1:15.576	1:15.486	
2	1	(Brazil) Ayrton Senna	McLaren-Honda	1:16.815	1:16.227	+0.741
3	2	(Austria) Gerhard Berger	McLaren-Honda	1:16.672	1:16.877	+1.186
4	6	(Italy) Riccardo Patrese	Williams-Renault	1:17.571	1:16.989	+1.503
5	27	(France) Jean Alesi	Ferrari	1:18.388	1:17.208	+1.722
6	19	(Germany) Michael Schumacher	Benetton-Ford	1:18.251	1:17.635	+2.149
7	16	(Austria) Karl Wendlinger	March-Ilmor	1:18.880	1:18.115	+2.629
8	20	(United Kingdom) Martin Brundle	Benetton-Ford	1:19.885	1:18.327	+2.841
9	28	(Italy) Ivan Capelli	Ferrari	1:19.039	1:18.387	+2.901
10	4	(Italy) Andrea de Cesaris	Tyrrell-Ilmor	1:18.544	1:18.907	+3.058
11	12	(United Kingdom) Johnny Herbert	Lotus-Ford	1:19.362	1:18.626	+3.140
12	3	(France) Olivier Grouillard	Tyrrell-Ilmor	1:19.473	1:18.749	+3.263
13	26	(France) Érik Comas	Ligier-Renault	1:19.970	1:19.200	+3.714
14	25	(Belgium) Thierry Boutsen	Ligier-Renault	1:19.506	1:19.296	+3.810
15	15	(Italy) Gabriele Tarquini	Fondmetal-Ford	1:19.577	1:19.305	+3.819
16	10	(Japan) Aguri Suzuki	Footwork-Mugen-Honda	1:19.532	1:20.285	+4.046
17	9	(Italy) Michele Alboreto	Footwork-Mugen-Honda	1:19.571	1:19.643	+4.085
18	30	(Japan) Ukyo Katayama	Venturi-Lamborghini	1:22.129	1:19.621	+4.135
19	24	(Italy) Gianni Morbidelli	Minardi-Lamborghini	1:21.027	1:19.636	+4.150
20	23	(Brazil) Christian Fittipaldi	Minardi-Lamborghini	1:20.111	1:19.641	+4.155
21	11	(Finland) Mika Häkkinen	Lotus-Ford	1:19.672	1:19.931	+4.186
22	29	(France) Bertrand Gachot	Venturi-Lamborghini	1:21.477	1:20.039	+4.553
23	33	(Brazil) Maurício Gugelmin	Jordan-Yamaha	1:20.120	1:20.216	+4.634
24	21	(Finland) JJ Lehto	Dallara-Ferrari	1:20.571	1:20.126	+4.640
25	22	(Italy) Pierluigi Martini	Dallara-Ferrari	1:21.134	1:20.203	+4.717
26	7	(Belgium) Eric van de Poele	Brabham-Judd	1:21.648	1:20.488	+5.002
27	17	(France) Paul Belmondo	March-Ilmor	1:22.022	1:20.580	+5.094
28	14	(Switzerland) Andrea Chiesa	Fondmetal-Ford	1:22.170	1:21.209	+5.723
29	32	(Italy) Stefano Modena	Jordan-Yamaha	1:22.020	1:21.494	+6.008
30	8	(Italy) Giovanna Amati	Brabham-Judd	1:25.942	1:24.405	+8.919

== Race ==
=== Race report ===
The race was fairly uneventful as Mansell led from lights to flag, finishing nearly 25 seconds ahead of Patrese. Martin Brundle spun off on the first lap but was able to continue until his clutch failed as a result of the spin and was forced into retirement when he pulled into the pits. Senna drove well to ensure he remained on the podium with a 1991 car, as did Schumacher, who gained from his qualifying position to complete the race in fourth place after Jean Alesi had retired with engine failure on lap 41 while behind Senna and ahead of Schumacher. Berger finished in fifth place, nearly forty seconds behind his teammate; he was the last driver to finish the race on the lead lap. Johnny Herbert finished in sixth place and took the final point for Lotus after the Tyrrell of Andrea de Cesaris had retired when his Ilmor engine failed on lap 42.

=== Race classification ===
Pos	No	Driver	Constructor	Laps	Time/Retired	Grid	Points
1	5	(United Kingdom) Nigel Mansell	Williams-Renault	72	1:36:45.320	1	10
2	6	(Italy) Riccardo Patrese	Williams-Renault	72	+ 24.360	4	6
3	1	(Brazil) Ayrton Senna	McLaren-Honda	72	+ 34.675	2	4
4	19	(Germany) Michael Schumacher	Benetton-Ford	72	+ 47.863	6	3
5	2	(Austria) Gerhard Berger	McLaren-Honda	72	+ 1:13.634	3	2
6	12	(United Kingdom) Johnny Herbert	Lotus-Ford	71	+ 1 lap	11	1
7	26	(France) Érik Comas	Ligier-Renault	71	+ 1 lap	13	
8	10	(Japan) Aguri Suzuki	Footwork-Mugen-Honda	70	+ 2 laps	16	
9	11	(Finland) Mika Häkkinen	Lotus-Ford	70	+ 2 laps	21	
10	9	(Italy) Michele Alboreto	Footwork-Mugen-Honda	70	+ 2 laps	17	
11	33	(Brazil) Maurício Gugelmin	Jordan-Yamaha	70	+ 2 laps	23	
12	30	(Japan) Ukyo Katayama	Venturi-Lamborghini	68	+ 4 laps	18	
13	7	(Belgium) Eric van de Poele	Brabham-Judd	68	+ 4 laps	26	
Ret	3	(France) Olivier Grouillard	Tyrrell-Ilmor	62	Engine	12	
Ret	25	(Belgium) Thierry Boutsen	Ligier-Renault	60	Fuel system	14	
Ret	22	(Italy) Pierluigi Martini	Dallara-Ferrari	56	Clutch	25	
Ret	24	(Italy) Gianni Morbidelli	Minardi-Lamborghini	55	Engine	19	
Ret	21	(Finland) JJ Lehto	Dallara-Ferrari	44	Gearbox	24	
Ret	23	(Brazil) Christian Fittipaldi	Minardi-Lamborghini	43	Alternator	20	
Ret	4	(Italy) Andrea de Cesaris	Tyrrell-Ilmor	41	Engine	10	
Ret	27	(France) Jean Alesi	Ferrari	40	Engine	5	
Ret	28	(Italy) Ivan Capelli	Ferrari	28	Engine	9	
Ret	15	(Italy) Gabriele Tarquini	Fondmetal-Ford	23	Engine	15	
Ret	16	(Austria) Karl Wendlinger	March-Ilmor	13	Overheating	7	
Ret	29	(France) Bertrand Gachot	Venturi-Lamborghini	8	Steering	22	
Ret	20	(United Kingdom) Martin Brundle	Benetton-Ford	1	Clutch	8	
DNQ	17	(France) Paul Belmondo	March-Ilmor				
DNQ	14	(Switzerland) Andrea Chiesa	Fondmetal-Ford				
DNQ	32	(Italy) Stefano Modena	Jordan-Yamaha				
DNQ	8	(Italy) Giovanna Amati	Brabham-Judd				
EX	34	(Italy) Alex Caffi	Andrea Moda-Judd				
EX	35	(Italy) Enrico Bertaggia	Andrea Moda-Judd				

== Championship standings after the race ==
Drivers' Championship standings

Pos	Driver	Points
1	(United Kingdom) Nigel Mansell	10
2	(Italy) Riccardo Patrese	6
3	(Brazil) Ayrton Senna	4
4	(Germany) Michael Schumacher	3
5	(Austria) Gerhard Berger	2

Constructors' Championship standings

Pos	Constructor	Points
1	(United Kingdom) Williams-Renault	16
2	(United Kingdom) McLaren-Honda	6
3	(United Kingdom) Benetton-Ford	3
4	(United Kingdom) Lotus-Ford	1

- Note: Only the top five positions are included for both sets of standings.

Previous race: 1991 Australian Grand Prix	FIA Formula One World Championship; 1992 season	Next race: 1992 Mexican Grand Prix
Previous race: 1985 South African Grand Prix	South African Grand Prix	Next race: 1993 South African Grand Prix
