= 1992 Brazilian Grand Prix =

- Race 3 of 16 in the 1992 Formula One World Championship
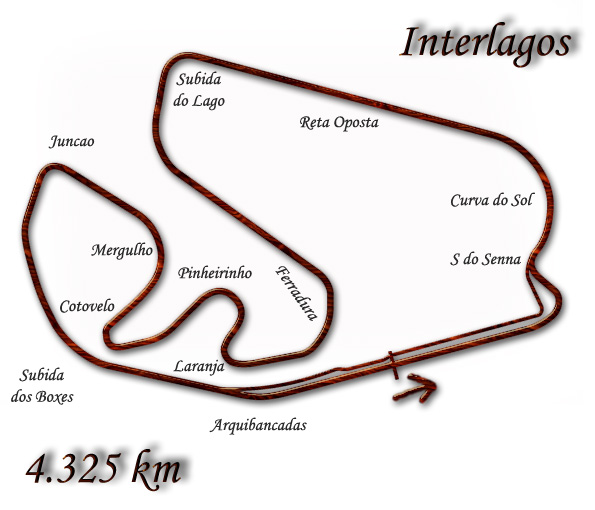

Race details
- Date: 5 April 1992
- Official name: XXI Grande Prêmio do Brasil
- Location: Autódromo José Carlos Pace; Interlagos, São Paulo, Brazil
- Course: Permanent racing facility
- Course length: 4.325 km (2.687 miles)
- Distance: 71 laps, 307.075 km (190.808 miles)
- Weather: Dry

Pole position
Driver	(United Kingdom) Nigel Mansell	Williams-Renault
- Time: 1:15.703

Fastest lap
Driver	(Italy) Riccardo Patrese	Williams-Renault
- Time: 1:19.490 on lap 34

Podium
First	(United Kingdom) Nigel Mansell	Williams-Renault
Second	(Italy) Riccardo Patrese	Williams-Renault
Third	(Germany) Michael Schumacher	Benetton-Ford

The 1992 Brazilian Grand Prix (formally the XXI Grande Prêmio do Brasil) was a Formula One motor race held at Interlagos on 5 April 1992. It was the third race of the 1992 Formula One World Championship.

The 71-lap race was won by Englishman Nigel Mansell, driving a Williams-Renault, after he started from pole position. Mansell's Italian teammate, Riccardo Patrese, finished second after leading the first 31 laps, with German Michael Schumacher third in a Benetton-Ford.

== Background ==
Going into the race, the two major talking points were Williams' utter domination of the previous two races, as well as McLaren's response to that domination: the new MP4/7A would debut at Interlagos, despite having originally been scheduled to debut at Barcelona. However, the car was still experiencing teething issues, despite an intensive testing programme at Silverstone following the Mexican Grand Prix. The team brought a total of six complete cars to the race, including three MP4/6Bs to be tested alongside the MP4/7A.

== Qualifying ==
=== Pre-qualifying report ===
For the first time in 1992, there was a need for a pre-qualifying hour on Friday morning. The pool consisted of six cars, which needed to be reduced to four to ensure the maximum of thirty cars in the main qualifying sessions. The entrants were the two Lamborghini-powered Venturi LC92 cars entered by the Larrousse team, and driven by Bertrand Gachot and Ukyo Katayama; the Footwork FA13-Mugen-Honda of Michele Alboreto; the Fondmetal GR01 of Andrea Chiesa, and the two Andrea Moda S921s of Roberto Moreno and Perry McCarthy. Moreno and McCarthy had been recruited by Andrea Moda after team boss Andrea Sassetti had fired both his drivers (Alex Caffi and Enrico Bertaggia) after they had criticised the amateurish way the team had been run thus far.

With very little time to prepare, McCarthy had hastily acquired a FISA Super Licence which enabled him to compete in Formula One. However, when he arrived at Interlagos, his licence was rescinded by race director Roland Bruynseraede, who told him there had been an error in the issuing of the licence, so McCarthy was withdrawn from the event. In any case, the team had not finished building his car in time, so he would not have driven in the session anyway.

This left five cars in the session, and it became clear which four were to progress when the remaining Andrea Moda of Roberto Moreno managed just two laps before it broke down, having posted a very slow time. The other four cars were over fifteen seconds faster, with Gachot's Venturi topping the time sheets. Alboreto was just under two tenths of a second slower, with Chiesa third in the Fondmetal. Fourth was Katayama, just over a second slower than his team-mate Gachot. Thus Moreno failed to pre-qualify.

=== Pre-qualifying classification ===
Pos	No	Driver	Constructor	Time	Gap
1	29	(France) Bertrand Gachot	Venturi-Lamborghini	1:22.161	
2	9	(Italy) Michele Alboreto	Footwork-Mugen-Honda	1:22.346	+0.185
3	14	(Switzerland) Andrea Chiesa	Fondmetal-Ford	1:22.860	+0.699
4	30	(Japan) Ukyo Katayama	Venturi-Lamborghini	1:23.272	+1.111
5	34	(Brazil) Roberto Moreno	Andrea Moda-Judd	1:38.569	+16.408

=== Qualifying report ===
The Williams cars were ahead of the McLarens with Mansell on pole ahead of Patrese, with Senna third in front of his home crowd ahead of Berger, Schumacher, and Alesi. There was controversy in the second qualifying session, as Senna slowed in front of an over-enthusiastic Mansell, forcing him wide on the entry to turn 11 and into a spin. Having been collected by the outside wall, Mansell limped out of his damaged Williams. Berger's time was set in one of the MP4/6B's, as he suffered an engine failure in his primary car, an MP4/7A; however, he raced an MP4/7A on raceday. As of 2024, this was the last time a woman, Giovanna Amati, took part in the World Championship (Amati would be sacked by Brabham after this race and replaced by Englishman Damon Hill, son of late and two-time World Champion Graham Hill).

=== Qualifying classification ===
Pos	No	Driver	Constructor	Q1	Q2	Gap
1	5	(United Kingdom) Nigel Mansell	Williams-Renault	1:15.703	1:16.091	
2	6	(Italy) Riccardo Patrese	Williams-Renault	1:17.591	1:16.894	+1.191
3	1	(Brazil) Ayrton Senna	McLaren-Honda	1:19.358	1:17.902	+2.199
4	2	(Austria) Gerhard Berger	McLaren-Honda	1:19.277	1:18.416	+2.713
5	19	(Germany) Michael Schumacher	Benetton-Ford	1:18.541	1:18.582	+2.838
6	27	(France) Jean Alesi	Ferrari	1:19.340	1:18.647	+2.944
7	20	(United Kingdom) Martin Brundle	Benetton-Ford	1:19.488	1:18.711	+3.008
8	22	(Italy) Pierluigi Martini	Dallara-Ferrari	1:18.953	1:20.018	+3.250
9	16	(Austria) Karl Wendlinger	March-Ilmor	1:19.897	1:19.007	+3.304
10	25	(Belgium) Thierry Boutsen	Ligier-Renault	1:20.823	1:19.038	+3.335
11	28	(Italy) Ivan Capelli	Ferrari	1:19.895	1:19.300	+3.597
12	32	(Italy) Stefano Modena	Jordan-Yamaha	1:19.344	1:19.314	+3.611
13	4	(Italy) Andrea de Cesaris	Tyrrell-Ilmor	1:19.343	1:19.497	+3.640
14	9	(Italy) Michele Alboreto	Footwork-Mugen-Honda	1:19.533	1:20.159	+3.830
15	26	(France) Érik Comas	Ligier-Renault	1:19.541	1:19.537	+3.834
16	21	(Finland) JJ Lehto	Dallara-Ferrari	1:20.502	1:19.834	+4.131
17	3	(France) Olivier Grouillard	Tyrrell-Ilmor	1:21.930	1:19.849	+4.146
18	29	(France) Bertrand Gachot	Venturi-Lamborghini	1:20.413	1:19.927	+4.224
19	15	(Italy) Gabriele Tarquini	Fondmetal-Ford	1:20.533	1:19.993	+4.290
20	23	(Brazil) Christian Fittipaldi	Minardi-Lamborghini	1:21.019	1:20.133	+4.430
21	33	(Brazil) Maurício Gugelmin	Jordan-Yamaha	1:20.817	1:20.266	+4.563
22	10	(Japan) Aguri Suzuki	Footwork-Mugen-Honda	1:20.891	1:20.435	+4.732
23	24	(Italy) Gianni Morbidelli	Minardi-Lamborghini	1:20.445	1:20.862	+4.742
24	11	(Finland) Mika Häkkinen	Lotus-Ford	1:20.577	1:20.734	+4.874
25	30	(Japan) Ukyo Katayama	Venturi-Lamborghini	1:21.568	1:20.648	+4.945
26	12	(United Kingdom) Johnny Herbert	Lotus-Ford	1:21.161	1:20.650	+4.947
27	14	(Switzerland) Andrea Chiesa	Fondmetal-Ford	no time	1:20.809	+5.066
28	17	(France) Paul Belmondo	March-Ilmor	1:20.886	1:22.875	+5.183
29	7	(Belgium) Eric van de Poele	Brabham-Judd	1:22.742	1:21.770	+6.067
30	8	(Italy) Giovanna Amati	Brabham-Judd	1:30.420	1:26.645	+10.942

== Race ==
=== Race report ===
On the parade lap, Gerhard Berger stalled and had to start at the back. Mansell’s start was poor and Patrese blasted ahead of him with Brundle getting ahead of Alesi. The order from there was Patrese, Mansell, Senna, Schumacher, Brundle and Alesi. Berger had to retire after only four laps in the pits with electrical failure. Both Williams cars pulled away while Senna was holding the rest at bay; Schumacher was thirty seconds behind by the time he had passed Senna for third on lap 13. Martin Brundle and Jean Alesi passed him soon afterwards and Senna retired with engine problems on lap 17.

The stops brought Alesi closer to Brundle and Alesi made his move on lap 31. The two collided, with Brundle spinning out into retirement as a result. This promoted Karl Wendlinger in the March up to fifth and he was there until his clutch failed on lap 56. Thierry Boutsen collided with teammate Érik Comas in the leading Ligier and forced the Lotus of Johnny Herbert off into the gravel at the Senna S, forcing Boutsen and Herbert to retire but Comas managed to continue, this incident happened just six laps after Brundle's retirement, Comas would soon retire with gearbox failure on lap 42 which meant a double retirement for Ligier. Meanwhile, Mansell pitted while passing back markers and took advantage of subsequent clear laps, taking over first place when Patrese pitted after slower laps passing more of the back markers. Mansell then built a lead and won with a 29-second lead over Patrese in second, another Williams 1–2 and lapping the rest of the field ahead of Michael Schumacher, Jean Alesi, Ivan Capelli who was able to score his first points for Ferrari in fifth (which was Ferrari's only double points finish of the season) and Michele Alboreto scoring his first point for Footwork.

=== Race classification ===
Pos	No	Driver	Constructor	Laps	Time/Retired	Grid	Points
1	5	(United Kingdom) Nigel Mansell	Williams-Renault	71	1:36:51.856	1	10
2	6	(Italy) Riccardo Patrese	Williams-Renault	71	+ 29.330	2	6
3	19	(Germany) Michael Schumacher	Benetton-Ford	70	+ 1 lap	5	4
4	27	(France) Jean Alesi	Ferrari	70	+ 1 lap	6	3
5	28	(Italy) Ivan Capelli	Ferrari	70	+ 1 lap	11	2
6	9	(Italy) Michele Alboreto	Footwork-Mugen-Honda	70	+ 1 lap	14	1
7	24	(Italy) Gianni Morbidelli	Minardi-Lamborghini	69	+ 2 laps	23	
8	21	(Finland) JJ Lehto	Dallara-Ferrari	69	+ 2 laps	16	
9	30	(Japan) Ukyo Katayama	Venturi-Lamborghini	68	+ 3 laps	25	
10	11	(Finland) Mika Häkkinen	Lotus-Ford	67	+ 4 laps	24	
Ret	15	(Italy) Gabriele Tarquini	Fondmetal-Ford	62	Engine	19	
Ret	16	(Austria) Karl Wendlinger	March-Ilmor	55	Clutch	9	
Ret	23	(Brazil) Christian Fittipaldi	Minardi-Lamborghini	54	Gearbox	20	
Ret	3	(France) Olivier Grouillard	Tyrrell-Ilmor	52	Engine	17	
Ret	26	(France) Érik Comas	Ligier-Renault	42	Gearbox	15	
Ret	12	(United Kingdom) Johnny Herbert	Lotus-Ford	36	Collision	26	
Ret	25	(Belgium) Thierry Boutsen	Ligier-Renault	36	Collision	10	
Ret	33	(Brazil) Maurício Gugelmin	Jordan-Yamaha	36	Gearbox	21	
Ret	20	(United Kingdom) Martin Brundle	Benetton-Ford	30	Collision	7	
Ret	22	(Italy) Pierluigi Martini	Dallara-Ferrari	24	Clutch	8	
Ret	29	(France) Bertrand Gachot	Venturi-Lamborghini	23	Suspension	18	
Ret	4	(Italy) Andrea de Cesaris	Tyrrell-Ilmor	21	Engine	13	
Ret	1	(Brazil) Ayrton Senna	McLaren-Honda	17	Engine	3	
Ret	2	(Austria) Gerhard Berger	McLaren-Honda	4	Electrical	4	
Ret	10	(Japan) Aguri Suzuki	Footwork-Mugen-Honda	2	Engine	22	
Ret	32	(Italy) Stefano Modena	Jordan-Yamaha	1	Gearbox	12	
DNQ	14	(Switzerland) Andrea Chiesa	Fondmetal-Ford				
DNQ	17	(France) Paul Belmondo	March-Ilmor				
DNQ	7	(Belgium) Eric van de Poele	Brabham-Judd				
DNQ	8	(Italy) Giovanna Amati	Brabham-Judd				
DNPQ	34	(Brazil) Roberto Moreno	Andrea Moda-Judd				

== Championship standings after the race ==
Drivers' Championship standings

Pos	Driver	Points
1	(United Kingdom) Nigel Mansell	30
2	(Italy) Riccardo Patrese	18
3	(Germany) Michael Schumacher	11
4	(Austria) Gerhard Berger	5
5	(Brazil) Ayrton Senna	4

Constructors' Championship standings

	Pos	Constructor	Points
	1	(United Kingdom) Williams-Renault	48
1	2	(United Kingdom) Benetton-Ford	11
1	3	(United Kingdom) McLaren-Honda	9
10	4	(Italy) Ferrari	5
1	5	(United Kingdom) Tyrrell-Ilmor	2

- Note: Only the top five positions are included for both sets of standings.

Previous race: 1992 Mexican Grand Prix	FIA Formula One World Championship; 1992 season	Next race: 1992 Spanish Grand Prix
Previous race: 1991 Brazilian Grand Prix	Brazilian Grand Prix	Next race: 1993 Brazilian Grand Prix
