= Andrea Moda Formula =

Auto racing team in Italy

Andrea Moda
- Full name: Andrea Moda Formula
- Base: Civitanova Marche, Italy
- Founder(s): Andrea Sassetti
- Noted drivers: (Italy) Alex Caffi (Italy) Enrico Bertaggia (Brazil) Roberto Moreno (United Kingdom) Perry McCarthy
- Previous name: Coloni Racing

Formula One World Championship career
- First entry: 1992 South African Grand Prix
- Races entered: 9 (1 start)
- Engines: Judd
- Constructors' Championships: 0
- Drivers' Championships: 0
- Race victories: 0
- Pole positions: 0
- Fastest laps: 0
- Final entry: 1992 Belgian Grand Prix

Andrea Moda Formula was a Formula One team that competed during the 1992 Formula One World Championship. The team was owned by Italian shoe designer Andrea Sassetti, who named the team after his company. The team contested nine races but managed to only qualify for one. Statistically, and by general perception, Andrea Moda is widely considered to be one of the worst constructors to ever enter Formula One.

== Origins ==
In September 1991, Sassetti bought the Coloni F1 team after it had failed to pre-qualify a car for every single race that year. Coloni's four-year history resulted in 14 starts in 82 attempts. The team had not qualified for a Grand Prix in over two years, having not competed in a race since Roberto Moreno started 15th at the 1989 Portuguese Grand Prix. Coloni's best finish was 8th place, scored by Gabriele Tarquini in the 1988 Canadian Grand Prix.

The team hired a number of ex-Coloni staff and a deal was sought with Simtek to run a car that had been designed in 1990 for BMW. Now named the Andrea Moda S921 the chassis was fitted with Judd V10 engines, but the cars were not ready for the start of the season.

== 1992 season ==
For the season-opening round in South Africa, Sassetti arrived with a modified Coloni C4B chassis for drivers Alex Caffi and Enrico Bertaggia. The team was excluded from the event for not having paid the $100,000 deposit for new teams in the World Championship, Sassetti arguing that it was not a new team as he had simply taken over the Coloni team and not formed a new one but, since Sassetti neglected to buy Coloni's entry to the Championship along with the team itself, the FIA were unmoved. Caffi performed a few reconnaissance laps in the Thursday familiarization session (arranged as the revised Kyalami circuit was new to all the teams) but did not participate in any official free practice or qualifying sessions. In Mexico, the team arrived with all its equipment but the cars were still being built and neither ran.

Following this both Caffi and Bertaggia were dropped for criticizing the team's preparation, with Andrea Moda arriving at the Brazilian Grand Prix with the experienced Roberto Moreno and Perry McCarthy (who had previously tested for Williams and would later gain fame as The Stig on the BBC's motoring show Top Gear) nominated as the drivers. While Moreno gave the S921 its first competitive run (failing to pre-qualify), McCarthy was refused a Super Licence and did not run. McCarthy finally received his Super Licence for the following round in Spain, but the car only made it a short distance down the pitlane before expiring. Moreno was again unable to pre-qualify. Around this time Bertaggia approached the team again, having found $1 million in sponsorship funds. Sassetti wanted him to return in place of McCarthy but the FIA blocked any further driver changes after the team's earlier shenanigans. Bitter at the loss of funding, Sassetti began to ignore McCarthy's entry and concentrated the team's resources on Moreno.

Roberto Moreno in the Andrea Moda S921, at the 1992 Monaco Grand Prix, the only race for which the team qualified

At the Monaco Grand Prix, McCarthy's car was eliminated in pre-qualifying with an official lap time of 17:05.924. Moreno, meanwhile, successfully navigated both pre-qualifying and then qualifying to start the Monaco Grand Prix from 26th on the grid with a 20th on the grid after the first qualifying session on Thursday, retiring after 11 laps with an engine failure. After this progress the team ran into problems which some thought were bad luck and others down to basic disorganisation. In Canada the team was without engines because Sassetti had failed to pay Judd. A motor was borrowed from Brabham allowing Moreno to perform a few laps but he failed to pre-qualify while McCarthy was once again unable to run. Many people had left the team by this stage and the operation missed the French Grand Prix entirely because its truck was stuck in one of the blockades by French truck drivers; every other team had successfully negotiated the blockades. At this point the few sponsors the team had withdrew, leaving Sassetti reluctantly funding the team himself. By now the second car nominally being used by McCarthy was effectively a spare for Moreno and the Brit was receiving ever poorer treatment from the team - at his home race he was sent out on wet weather tyres on a dry track and at the Hungaroring he was only allowed out of the pitlane 45 seconds from the end of the pre-qualifying session making it impossible for him to set a lap time. At this point, Andrea Moda was warned to make a meaningful attempt to run McCarthy's car as a second team entry, or its exclusion from the sport would be considered.

For the Belgian Grand Prix in late August, both Andrea Moda cars were guaranteed entry into qualifying, because Brabham had withdrawn. This reduced the entry list to 30 cars, eliminating the need for a pre-qualifying session. In qualifying, the Andrea Moda cars were the slowest two on track, with Moreno 13% slower than pole, and McCarthy, who suffered an accident in his session, 22% slower than pole; neither qualified to race. In the same weekend, Sassetti was arrested in the paddock for allegedly forging auto part invoices.

The FIA World Motor Sport Council expelled Andrea Moda Formula for the remainder of the 1992 season a week later, on September 8, on the regulatory grounds of "[failure to operate a] team in a manner compatible with the standards of the championship or in any way brings the championship into disrepute." Following the decision, the team was refused entry into Monza's paddock for the Italian Grand Prix.

The Andrea Moda name would later then move to CART, sponsoring Euromotorsport in 1993.

== Docufilm ==
In October 2023, the docufilm, entitled Last and Furious - The true story of the Andrea Moda Formula, on the events of this team, was presented at the 80th Venice International Film Festival.

== Complete Formula One results ==
(key) (results in bold indicate pole position)

Year	Chassis	Engine	Tyres	No.	Drivers	1	2	3	4	5	6	7	8	9	10	11	12	13	14	15	16	Points	WCC
1992	C4B; S921	Judd GV 3.5 V10	**G**			RSA	MEX	BRA	ESP	SMR	MON	CAN	FRA	GBR	GER	HUN	BEL	ITA	POR	JPN	AUS	0	NC
1992	C4B; S921	Judd GV 3.5 V10	**G**	34	(Italy) Alex Caffi	EX	DNP															0	NC
1992	C4B; S921	Judd GV 3.5 V10	**G**	34	(Brazil) Roberto Moreno			DNPQ	DNPQ	DNPQ	Ret	DNPQ	DNA	DNPQ	DNPQ	DNQ	DNQ					0	NC
1992	C4B; S921	Judd GV 3.5 V10	**G**	35	(Italy) Enrico Bertaggia	EX	DNP															0	NC
1992	C4B; S921	Judd GV 3.5 V10	**G**	35	(United Kingdom) Perry McCarthy			DNP	DNPQ	DNPQ	DNPQ	DNP	DNA	DNPQ	EX	DNPQ	DNQ					0	NC
