= 1992 Spanish Grand Prix =

- Race 4 of 16 in the 1992 Formula One World Championship
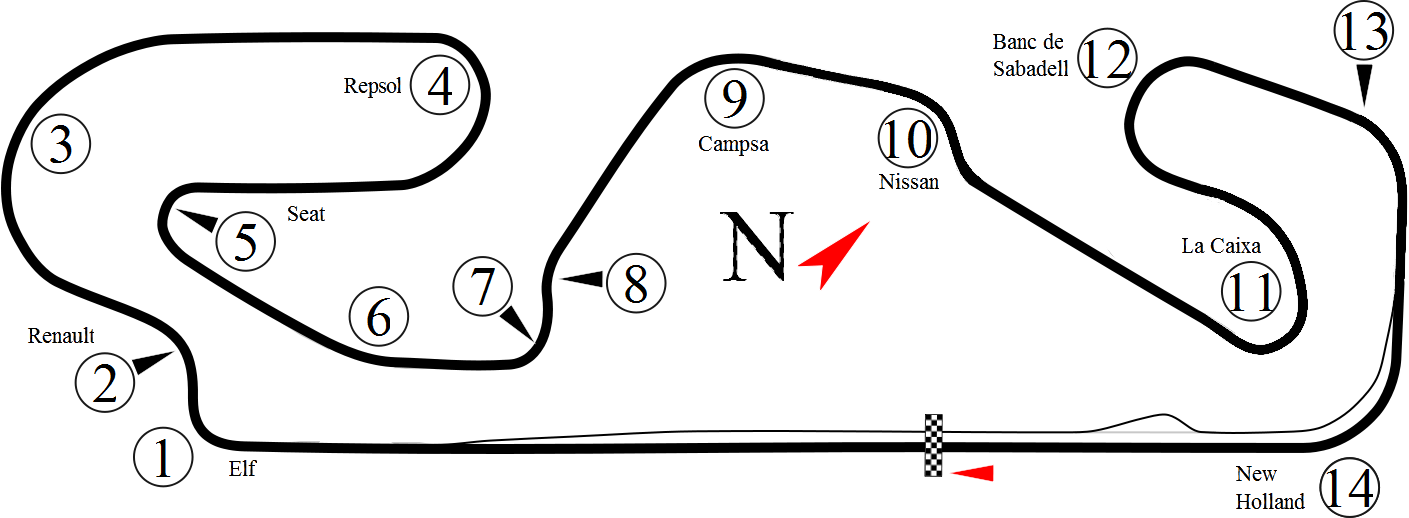

Race details
- Date: 3 May 1992
- Official name: Gran Premio Tío Pepe de España
- Location: Circuit de Catalunya, Montmeló, Catalonia, Spain
- Course: Permanent racing facility
- Course length: 4.747 km (2.950 miles)
- Distance: 65 laps, 308.555 km (191.727 miles)
- Weather: Dry at start, wet later
- Attendance: 28,000

Pole position
Driver	(United Kingdom) Nigel Mansell	Williams-Renault
- Time: 1:20.190

Fastest lap
Driver	(United Kingdom) Nigel Mansell	Williams-Renault
- Time: 1:42.503 on lap 10

Podium
First	(United Kingdom) Nigel Mansell	Williams-Renault
Second	(Germany) Michael Schumacher	Benetton-Ford
Third	(France) Jean Alesi	Ferrari

The 1992 Spanish Grand Prix was a Formula One motor race held on 3 May 1992 at the Circuit de Catalunya, Montmeló. The 65-lap race was the fourth round of the 1992 Formula One World Championship and was won by Nigel Mansell driving a Williams-Renault and scoring the third grand chelem of his career.

The race was also advertised as the Grand Prix of the Olympic Games. The race was moved up from its former September date, and held just months before the 1992 Summer Olympics in Barcelona.

== Qualifying ==
=== Pre-qualifying report ===
The Friday morning pre-qualifying session was a similar story to the previous session in Brazil. The Andrea Moda cars were well behind the performance of the other entrants in the session, who all pre-qualified easily. Perry McCarthy had regained his Super Licence so was able to compete for the team alongside Roberto Moreno. Team boss Andrea Sassetti had been approached by Enrico Bertaggia, whom Sassetti had sacked after the Mexican Grand Prix, but who now wanted to return to the team with $1 million in sponsorship. Sassetti wanted to fire McCarthy and rehire Bertaggia, but was told that the team had already reached its maximum number of driver changes for the season, so was forced to retain McCarthy.

In the session itself, Bertrand Gachot was again fastest for Larrousse, less than a tenth of a second faster than Michele Alboreto in the Footwork. Third was Gachot's team-mate Ukyo Katayama, 1.4 seconds ahead of the last pre-qualifier, Andrea Chiesa in the Fondmetal.

McCarthy took to the track for Andrea Moda, but his engine cut out just four metres after the pitlane exit line. Moreno managed three laps in his car before it also suffered an engine failure. McCarthy's car was brought back for Moreno to use, but the Brazilian was still unable to pre-qualify.

=== Pre-qualifying classification ===
Pos	No	Driver	Constructor	Time	Gap
1	29	(France) Bertrand Gachot	Venturi-Lamborghini	1:26.032	—
2	9	(Italy) Michele Alboreto	Footwork-Mugen-Honda	1:26.120	+0.088
3	30	(Japan) Ukyo Katayama	Venturi-Lamborghini	1:26.484	+0.452
4	14	(Switzerland) Andrea Chiesa	Fondmetal-Ford	1:27.902	+1.870
5	34	(Brazil) Roberto Moreno	Andrea Moda-Judd	1:37.155	+11.123
6	35	(United Kingdom) Perry McCarthy	Andrea Moda-Judd	no time	—

=== Qualifying report ===
Damon Hill, son of former world champion Graham Hill, made his debut with Brabham, replacing Giovanna Amati who was dismissed from the team, but did not qualify for the race. As in the three previous races, Mansell qualified in pole position, ahead of Michael Schumacher, Ayrton Senna, Riccardo Patrese, Ivan Capelli and Martin Brundle.

=== Qualifying classification ===
Pos	No	Driver	Constructor	Q1	Q2	Gap
1	5	(United Kingdom) Nigel Mansell	Williams-Renault	1:20.190	1:46.737	
2	19	(Germany) Michael Schumacher	Benetton-Ford	1:21.195	No time	+1.005
3	1	(Brazil) Ayrton Senna	McLaren-Honda	1:21.209	1:46.581	+1.019
4	6	(Italy) Riccardo Patrese	Williams-Renault	1:21.534	No time	+1.344
5	28	(Italy) Ivan Capelli	Ferrari	1:22.413	1:52.319	+2.223
6	20	(United Kingdom) Martin Brundle	Benetton-Ford	1:22.529	No time	+2.339
7	2	(Austria) Gerhard Berger	McLaren-Honda	1:22.711	1:46.062	+2.521
8	27	(France) Jean Alesi	Ferrari	1:22.746	1:45.903	+2.556
9	16	(Austria) Karl Wendlinger	March-Ilmor	1:23.121	No time	+2.931
10	26	(France) Érik Comas	Ligier-Renault	1:23.593	1:50.914	+3.403
11	4	(Italy) Andrea de Cesaris	Tyrrell-Ilmor	1:23.723	1:49.847	+3.533
12	21	(Finland) JJ Lehto	Dallara-Ferrari	1:24.054	1:54.117	+3.864
13	22	(Italy) Pierluigi Martini	Dallara-Ferrari	1:24.236	1:54.590	+4.046
14	25	(Belgium) Thierry Boutsen	Ligier-Renault	1:24.583	1:56.313	+4.393
15	3	(France) Olivier Grouillard	Tyrrell-Ilmor	1:24.608	1:51.606	+4.418
16	9	(Italy) Michele Alboreto	Footwork-Mugen-Honda	1:24.634	1:48.366	+4.444
17	33	(Brazil) Maurício Gugelmin	Jordan-Yamaha	1:24.671	1:50.598	+4.481
18	15	(Italy) Gabriele Tarquini	Fondmetal-Ford	1:24.800	1:57.115	+4.610
19	10	(Japan) Aguri Suzuki	Footwork-Mugen-Honda	1:24.940	No time	+4.750
20	14	(Switzerland) Andrea Chiesa	Fondmetal-Ford	1:24.963	No time	+4.773
21	11	(Finland) Mika Häkkinen	Lotus-Ford	1:25.202	No time	+5.012
22	23	(Brazil) Christian Fittipaldi	Minardi-Lamborghini	1:25.315	1:54.122	+5.125
23	17	(France) Paul Belmondo	March-Ilmor	1:25.467	No time	+5.277
24	29	(France) Bertrand Gachot	Venturi-Lamborghini	1:25.700	1:54.108	+5.510
25	24	(Italy) Gianni Morbidelli	Minardi-Lamborghini	1:25.786	1:58.389	+5.596
26	12	(United Kingdom) Johnny Herbert	Lotus-Ford	1:25.786	No time	+5.596
27	30	(Japan) Ukyo Katayama	Venturi-Lamborghini	1:25.932	No time	+5.742
28	7	(Belgium) Eric van de Poele	Brabham-Judd	1:26.880	3:23.215	+6.690
29	32	(Italy) Stefano Modena	Jordan-Yamaha	1:27.480	1:54.443	+7.290
30	8	(United Kingdom) Damon Hill	Brabham-Judd	1:27.763	No time	+7.573

== Race ==
=== Race report ===
At the start of the race, in damp conditions, Patrese got by Schumacher and Senna. Ferrari driver Jean Alesi made a good start from eighth on the grid to third into the first corner on the first lap, forcing other drivers to take defensive actions and drop back. Senna dropped from third all the way to seventh, he recovered two positions to fifth during the first lap. The order was: Mansell, Patrese, Alesi, Schumacher, Senna and Capelli.

Andrea de Cesaris became the first retirement in the Tyrrell with an engine problem on lap 3 where he retired in the pits. Brundle meanwhile had spun off on the main straight into retirement with a clutch problem by lap 5. Schumacher attacked and passed Alesi on lap 7. Berger tried to do the same but tipped Alesi into a spin, putting the Frenchman behind Senna and Capelli as well. By, now the rain intensified, and Patrese spun off on lap 20 while trying to lap a backmarker. This put Mansell ahead of Schumacher, Senna, Berger, Capelli and Alesi. Maurício Gugelmin had spun into the pit wall on lap 25 meaning more disaster for the Jordan team, as he was the only one to qualify for the race.

Alesi pitted for fresh tyres halfway through the race, and soon began to charge up through the field as the rain intensified despite making contact with both Gerhard Berger in the McLaren and Mika Häkkinen in the Lotus forcing the Finn to spin off the track whilst trying to lap him, who eventually retired after 56 laps from spinning off. He cruised past Berger for fourth and began to close in quickly on Senna and Schumacher. With two laps to go Senna spun off and into the wall trying to lap Martini, although he was still classified ninth; he had already spun and recovered a few laps earlier. At the same time, Capelli spun off as well (The Italian was classified tenth).

Mansell continued his perfect record in 1992 with his fourth win of the season from Schumacher, Alesi, Berger, Alboreto and Pierluigi Martini, but for the first time in the season his Williams team did not score a 1-2 finish. Martin Brundle scored his fourth consecutive retirement of the season in his Benetton, it was proven to be a clutch failure by lap 2 causing the Benetton to eventually spin into retirement on lap 5.

=== Race classification ===
Pos	No	Driver	Constructor	Laps	Time/Retired	Grid	Points
1	5	(United Kingdom) Nigel Mansell	Williams-Renault	65	1:56:10.674	1	10
2	19	(Germany) Michael Schumacher	Benetton-Ford	65	+ 23.914	2	6
3	27	(France) Jean Alesi	Ferrari	65	+ 26.462	8	4
4	2	(Austria) Gerhard Berger	McLaren-Honda	65	+ 1:20.647	7	3
5	9	(Italy) Michele Alboreto	Footwork-Mugen-Honda	64	+ 1 lap	16	2
6	22	(Italy) Pierluigi Martini	Dallara-Ferrari	63	+ 2 laps	13	1
7	10	(Japan) Aguri Suzuki	Footwork-Mugen-Honda	63	+ 2 laps	19	
8	16	(Austria) Karl Wendlinger	March-Ilmor	63	+ 2 laps	9	
9	1	(Brazil) Ayrton Senna	McLaren-Honda	62	Spun off	3	
10	28	(Italy) Ivan Capelli	Ferrari	62	Spun off	5	
11	23	(Brazil) Christian Fittipaldi	Minardi-Lamborghini	61	+ 4 laps	22	
12	17	(France) Paul Belmondo	March-Ilmor	61	+ 4 laps	23	
Ret	21	(Finland) JJ Lehto	Dallara-Ferrari	56	Spun off	12	
Ret	15	(Italy) Gabriele Tarquini	Fondmetal-Ford	56	Spun off	18	
Ret	11	(Finland) Mika Häkkinen	Lotus-Ford	56	Spun off	21	
Ret	26	(France) Érik Comas	Ligier-Renault	55	Spun off	10	
Ret	29	(France) Bertrand Gachot	Venturi-Lamborghini	35	Engine	24	
Ret	3	(France) Olivier Grouillard	Tyrrell-Ilmor	30	Spun off	15	
Ret	24	(Italy) Gianni Morbidelli	Minardi-Lamborghini	26	Handling	25	
Ret	33	(Brazil) Maurício Gugelmin	Jordan-Yamaha	24	Spun off	17	
Ret	14	(Switzerland) Andrea Chiesa	Fondmetal-Ford	22	Spun off	20	
Ret	6	(Italy) Riccardo Patrese	Williams-Renault	19	Spun off	4	
Ret	12	(United Kingdom) Johnny Herbert	Lotus-Ford	13	Spun off	26	
Ret	25	(Belgium) Thierry Boutsen	Ligier-Renault	11	Engine	14	
Ret	20	(United Kingdom) Martin Brundle	Benetton-Ford	4	Spun off/Clutch	6	
Ret	4	(Italy) Andrea de Cesaris	Tyrrell-Ilmor	2	Engine	11	
DNQ	30	(Japan) Ukyo Katayama	Venturi-Lamborghini				
DNQ	7	(Belgium) Eric van de Poele	Brabham-Judd				
DNQ	32	(Italy) Stefano Modena	Jordan-Yamaha				
DNQ	8	(United Kingdom) Damon Hill	Brabham-Judd				
DNPQ	34	(Brazil) Roberto Moreno	Andrea Moda-Judd				
DNPQ	35	(United Kingdom) Perry McCarthy	Andrea Moda-Judd				

== Championship standings after the race ==
Drivers' Championship standings

	Pos	Driver	Points
	1	(United Kingdom) Nigel Mansell	40
	2	(Italy) Riccardo Patrese	18
	3	(Germany) Michael Schumacher	17
	4	(Austria) Gerhard Berger	8
1	5	(France) Jean Alesi	7

Constructors' Championship standings

	Pos	Constructor	Points
	1	(United Kingdom) Williams-Renault	58
	2	(United Kingdom) Benetton-Ford	17
	3	(United Kingdom) McLaren-Honda	12
	4	(Italy) Ferrari	9
2	5	(United Kingdom) Footwork-Mugen-Honda	3

- Note: Only the top five positions are included for both sets of standings.

Previous race: 1992 Brazilian Grand Prix	FIA Formula One World Championship; 1992 season	Next race: 1992 San Marino Grand Prix
Previous race: 1991 Spanish Grand Prix	Spanish Grand Prix	Next race: 1993 Spanish Grand Prix
