= 1992 Belgian Grand Prix =

Formula One motor race

- Race 12 of 16 in the 1992 Formula One World Championship
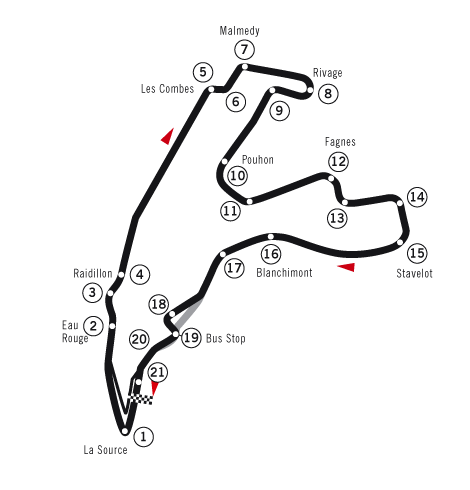

Race details
- Date: 30 August 1992
- Official name: L Grand Prix de Belgique
- Location: Circuit de Spa-Francorchamps; Francorchamps, Wallonia, Belgium
- Course: Permanent racing facility
- Course length: 6.940 km (4.312 miles)
- Distance: 44 laps, 305.341 km (189.730 miles)
- Weather: Overcast, brief rain mid-race

Pole position
Driver	(United Kingdom) Nigel Mansell	Williams-Renault
- Time: 1:50.545

Fastest lap
Driver	(Germany) Michael Schumacher	Benetton-Ford
- Time: 1:53.791 on lap 39

Podium
First	(Germany) Michael Schumacher	Benetton-Ford
Second	(United Kingdom) Nigel Mansell	Williams-Renault
Third	(Italy) Riccardo Patrese	Williams-Renault

The 1992 Belgian Grand Prix was a Formula One motor race held at Spa-Francorchamps on 30 August 1992. It was the twelfth race of the 1992 Formula One World Championship. The 44-lap race was won by Michael Schumacher, driving a Benetton-Ford. This was the first Grand Prix win for a German driver since Jochen Mass at the 1975 Spanish Grand Prix, and the first of an eventual record 91 Grand Prix wins for Schumacher (since eclipsed by Lewis Hamilton in 2020). New World Champion Nigel Mansell finished second in his Williams-Renault with teammate Riccardo Patrese third, thus securing the Constructors' Championship for Williams. Schumacher's win, which was the first full-length Grand Prix won by a German since Wolfgang von Trips's last win at the 1961 British Grand Prix, marked the last time a Formula One car to win a Grand Prix while sporting a H-pattern manual gearbox. This race also marked Ferrari's 500th start in a World Championship event as a team, (Note: Ferrari did not participate in the 1950 French Grand Prix, and Peter Whitehead's privateer entry in this race does not count towards the team's participation tally. Ferrari celebrated its 500th entry at the 1992 Hungarian Grand Prix due to counting Alberto Ascari entry at the 1952 Indy 500. Until 1960, the Indianapolis 500 was considered a round of the World Championship, albeit for reasons more symbolic than logical.) and the last race for Andrea Moda.

== Pre-race ==
There was no pre-qualifying session at this race after the Brabham team did not arrive due to financial problems and the impending sale of the team. This left thirty cars, the maximum allowed in the main qualifying sessions. Emanuele Naspetti made his Grand Prix debut for the March team, replacing Paul Belmondo.

== Qualifying ==
=== Qualifying report ===
Ligier driver Érik Comas was injured and briefly knocked unconscious in a heavy crash during practice on Friday and was advised by doctors not to drive again over the weekend, so he was withdrawn from qualifying. Ayrton Senna encountered Comas's car on the race track, stopped to help him, and cut off the car's engine to reduce the risk of fire. Comas later credited this with likely having saved his life. Gerhard Berger had a 160 mph crash down the hill in the wet during practice on the entrance to Eau Rouge with the back of the car catching fire, although he was uninjured.

Aside from Comas, the other three non-qualifiers included Minardi driver Christian Fittipaldi, returning after four races missed through injury. Also failing to qualify were the two Andrea Moda cars, this being the first time both cars had been present in the main qualifying sessions. Roberto Moreno could only manage 28th fastest, over five seconds slower than Fittipaldi, with Perry McCarthy 29th after he went off the track at the 170 mph Eau Rouge section. McCarthy reported to his team that the car's steering had jammed, and that he suspected the steering rack was flexing. Team boss Andrea Sassetti replied that the team already knew the rack was faulty because it had previously been fitted to Moreno's car, and he had reported the same problem. McCarthy quit the team after the Friday qualifying session. Moreno was a sole entry in a wet Saturday qualifying session. Sassetti was subsequently arrested in the paddock on Saturday afternoon on allegations of forging documents and fraud, and thus Andrea Moda was banned from the championship.

=== Qualifying classification ===
Pos	No	Driver	Constructor	Q1	Q2	Gap
1	5	(United Kingdom) Nigel Mansell	Williams-Renault	1:50.545	2:07.693	no time
2	1	(Brazil) Ayrton Senna	McLaren-Honda	1:52.743	2:14.983	+2.198
3	19	(Germany) Michael Schumacher	Benetton-Ford	1:53.221	2:11.770	+2.676
4	6	(Italy) Riccardo Patrese	Williams-Renault	1:53.557	no time	+3.012
5	27	(France) Jean Alesi	Ferrari	1:54.438	2:11.360	+3.893
6	2	(Austria) Gerhard Berger	McLaren-Honda	1:54.642	no time	+4.097
7	25	(Belgium) Thierry Boutsen	Ligier-Renault	1:54.654	2:12.153	+4.109
8	11	(Finland) Mika Häkkinen	Lotus-Ford	1:54.812	2:15.987	+4.267
9	20	(United Kingdom) Martin Brundle	Benetton-Ford	1:54.973	2:12.619	+4.428
10	12	(United Kingdom) Johnny Herbert	Lotus-Ford	1:55.027	2:16.726	+4.482
11	15	(Italy) Gabriele Tarquini	Fondmetal-Ford	1:55.965	no time	+5.420
12	28	(Italy) Ivan Capelli	Ferrari	1:56.075	2:15.529	+5.530
13	4	(Italy) Andrea de Cesaris	Tyrrell-Ilmor	1:56.111	2:11.341	+5.566
14	9	(Italy) Michele Alboreto	Footwork-Mugen-Honda	1:56.282	2:14.734	+5.737
15	14	(Belgium) Eric van de Poele	Fondmetal-Ford	1:56.674	no time	+6.129
16	21	(Finland) JJ Lehto	Dallara-Ferrari	1:56.809	2:12.232	+6.264
17	32	(Italy) Stefano Modena	Jordan-Yamaha	1:56.889	2:14.037	+6.344
18	16	(Austria) Karl Wendlinger	March-Ilmor	1:57.039	2:14.765	+6.494
19	22	(Italy) Pierluigi Martini	Dallara-Ferrari	1:57.267	no time	+6.722
20	29	(France) Bertrand Gachot	Venturi-Lamborghini	1:57.330	2:13.415	+6.785
21	17	(Italy) Emanuele Naspetti	March-Ilmor	1:57.794	2:16.618	+7.249
22	3	(France) Olivier Grouillard	Tyrrell-Ilmor	1:57.818	2:13.612	+7.273
23	24	(Italy) Gianni Morbidelli	Minardi-Lamborghini	1:58.126	2:23.090	+7.581
24	33	(Brazil) Maurício Gugelmin	Jordan-Yamaha	1:58.499	2:15.268	+7.954
25	10	(Japan) Aguri Suzuki	Footwork-Mugen-Honda	1:58.826	2:14.711	+8.281
26	30	(Japan) Ukyo Katayama	Venturi-Lamborghini	1:59.383	2:19.247	+8.838
27	23	(Brazil) Christian Fittipaldi	Minardi-Lamborghini	1:59.626	no time	+9.081
28	34	(Brazil) Roberto Moreno	Andrea Moda-Judd	2:05.096	2:24.830	+14.551
29	35	(United Kingdom) Perry McCarthy	Andrea Moda-Judd	2:15.050	no time	+24.505
30	26	(France) Érik Comas	Ligier-Renault	no time	no time	—

== Race ==
=== Race report ===
At the start before La Source, Gerhard Berger failed to get away from sixth position and retired after an immediate transmission problem which put him out straight away. Mansell attacked and passed Senna at the end of the second lap with Patrese following suit. Then it began to rain and almost everybody pitted for wets. In the early stages of the race, Senna showed strong pace, briefly leading from the Williams. Then, when rain fell and the other front-runners made pit stops for rain tyres, the Brazilian gambled on the rain stopping and thus stayed out. He pitted late and rejoined down in 12th as Alesi went out with a puncture after colliding with Mansell at La Source. Ivan Capelli suffered a dramatic engine failure on lap 26 as he went straight off into the gravel trap at Blanchimont whilst battling Herbert for sixth position.

By the time Thierry Boutsen spun off on lap 28, the track was beginning to dry, which meant Senna's gamble had failed, and the subsequent pit stop dropped him back down to twelfth. He then made a charge through the field, passing Mika Häkkinen's Lotus for fifth on the penultimate lap. Johnny Herbert retired once again with engine problems on lap 43, and was classified 13th. Schumacher took his first Grand Prix win for Benetton by a comfortable margin over both the Williamses of Mansell and Patrese after they both suffered engine problems in the closing laps (Mansell with a broken exhaust). The Williams duo were able to finish second and third ahead of Brundle in the other Benetton, Senna in the remaining McLaren and Häkkinen in the remaining Lotus securing the final point. Eighteen cars were classified as finishers, the highest number for the season. In what was his 18th race a year after his debut in 1991, Schumacher achieved his first Grand Prix win, the first of 91 career wins, and the first of a record six-Belgian Grand Prix wins.

=== Race classification ===
Pos	No	Driver	Constructor	Laps	Time/Retired	Grid	Points
1	19	(Germany) Michael Schumacher	Benetton-Ford	44	1:36:10.721	3	10
2	5	(United Kingdom) Nigel Mansell	Williams-Renault	44	+ 36.595	1	6
3	6	(Italy) Riccardo Patrese	Williams-Renault	44	+ 43.897	4	4
4	20	(United Kingdom) Martin Brundle	Benetton-Ford	44	+ 46.059	9	3
5	1	(Brazil) Ayrton Senna	McLaren-Honda	44	+ 1:08.369	2	2
6	11	(Finland) Mika Häkkinen	Lotus-Ford	44	+ 1:10.030	8	1
7	21	(Finland) JJ Lehto	Dallara-Ferrari	44	+ 1:38.237	16	
8	4	(Italy) Andrea de Cesaris	Tyrrell-Ilmor	43	+ 1 lap	13	
9	10	(Japan) Aguri Suzuki	Footwork-Mugen-Honda	43	+ 1 lap	25	
10	14	(Belgium) Eric van de Poele	Fondmetal-Ford	43	+ 1 lap	15	
11	16	(Austria) Karl Wendlinger	March-Ilmor	43	+ 1 lap	18	
12	17	(Italy) Emanuele Naspetti	March-Ilmor	43	+ 1 lap	21	
13	12	(United Kingdom) Johnny Herbert	Lotus-Ford	42	Engine	10	
14	33	(Brazil) Maurício Gugelmin	Jordan-Yamaha	42	+ 2 laps	24	
15	32	(Italy) Stefano Modena	Jordan-Yamaha	42	+ 2 laps	17	
16	24	(Italy) Gianni Morbidelli	Minardi-Lamborghini	42	+ 2 laps	23	
17	30	(Japan) Ukyo Katayama	Venturi-Lamborghini	42	+ 2 laps	26	
18	29	(France) Bertrand Gachot	Venturi-Lamborghini	40	Spun off	20	
Ret	25	(Belgium) Thierry Boutsen	Ligier-Renault	27	Spun off	7	
Ret	28	(Italy) Ivan Capelli	Ferrari	25	Engine	12	
Ret	15	(Italy) Gabriele Tarquini	Fondmetal-Ford	25	Engine	11	
Ret	9	(Italy) Michele Alboreto	Footwork-Mugen-Honda	20	Gearbox	14	
Ret	27	(France) Jean Alesi	Ferrari	7	Puncture	5	
Ret	3	(France) Olivier Grouillard	Tyrrell-Ilmor	1	Accident	22	
Ret	2	(Austria) Gerhard Berger	McLaren-Honda	0	Transmission	6	
Ret	22	(Italy) Pierluigi Martini	Dallara-Ferrari	0	Spun off	19	
DNQ	23	(Brazil) Christian Fittipaldi	Minardi-Lamborghini				
DNQ	34	(Brazil) Roberto Moreno	Andrea Moda-Judd				
DNQ	35	(United Kingdom) Perry McCarthy	Andrea Moda-Judd				
DNQ	26	(France) Érik Comas	Ligier-Renault		Qualifying accident		

== Championship standings after the race ==
Drivers' Championship standings

	Pos	Driver	Points
	1	(United Kingdom) **Nigel Mansell**	98
	2	(Italy) Riccardo Patrese	44
1	3	(Germany) Michael Schumacher	43
1	4	(Brazil) Ayrton Senna	36
	5	(Austria) Gerhard Berger	24

Constructors' Championship standings

	Pos	Constructor	Points
	1	(United Kingdom) **Williams-Renault**	142
1	2	(United Kingdom) Benetton-Ford	64
1	3	(United Kingdom) McLaren-Honda	60
	4	(Italy) Ferrari	16
	5	(United Kingdom) Lotus-Ford	11

- Note: Only the top five positions are included for both sets of standings.
- **Bold text** indicates the 1992 World Champions.

== Notes ==
Previous race: 1992 Hungarian Grand Prix	FIA Formula One World Championship; 1992 season	Next race: 1992 Italian Grand Prix
Previous race: 1991 Belgian Grand Prix	Belgian Grand Prix	Next race: 1993 Belgian Grand Prix
