= 1992 San Marino Grand Prix =

- Race 5 of 16 in the 1992 Formula One World Championship
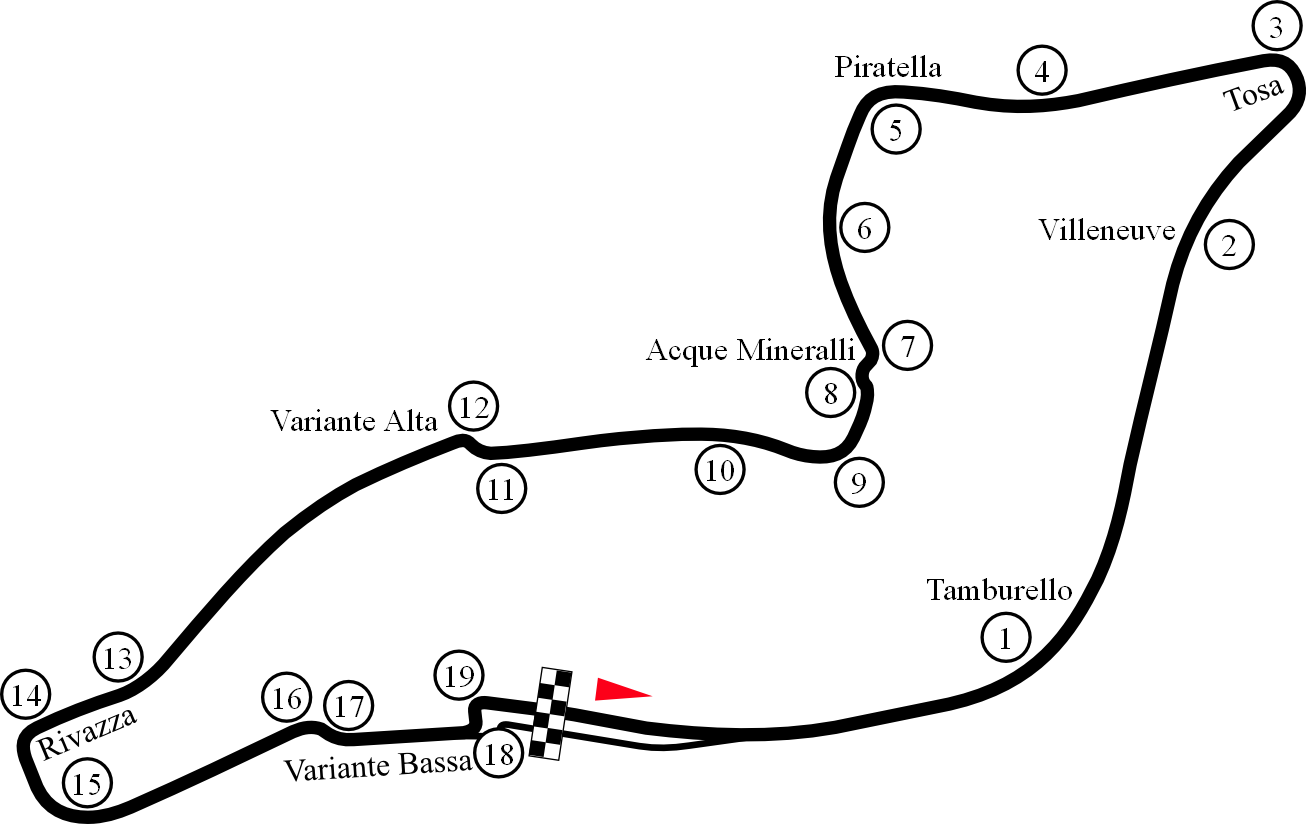

Race details
- Date: 17 May 1992
- Official name: XII Gran Premio Iceberg di San Marino
- Location: Autodromo Enzo e Dino Ferrari; Imola, Emilia-Romagna, Italy
- Course: Permanent racing facility
- Course length: 5.040 km (3.132 miles)
- Distance: 60 laps, 302.400 km (187.903 miles)
- Weather: Sunny

Pole position
Driver	(United Kingdom) Nigel Mansell	Williams-Renault
- Time: 1:21.842

Fastest lap
Driver	(Italy) Riccardo Patrese	Williams-Renault
- Time: 1:26.100 on lap 60

Podium
First	(United Kingdom) Nigel Mansell	Williams-Renault
Second	(Italy) Riccardo Patrese	Williams-Renault
Third	(Brazil) Ayrton Senna	McLaren-Honda

The 1992 San Marino Grand Prix (formally the XII Gran Premio Iceberg di San Marino) was a Formula One motor race held at Imola on 17 May 1992. It was the fifth race of the 1992 Formula One World Championship.

The 60-lap race was won from pole position by Nigel Mansell, driving a Williams-Renault. Mansell became the first driver to win the first five races of the season. Teammate Riccardo Patrese was second, with Ayrton Senna third in a McLaren-Honda.

== Qualifying ==
=== Pre-qualifying report ===
In the Friday morning pre-qualifying session, Michele Alboreto was fastest for the first time this season in the Footwork. He was half a second faster than the Venturi Larrousse of Bertrand Gachot, who was himself a couple of tenths of a second faster than his team-mate Ukyo Katayama. The fourth pre-qualifier was again Andrea Chiesa, nearly a second behind in the Fondmetal.

As in Spain, the two cars failing to pre-qualify were the Andrea Modas of Roberto Moreno and Perry McCarthy. Moreno had tested with the team here at Imola, and improved the car prior to the Grand Prix weekend, and the result was that he was just 0.463 of a second behind Chiesa. McCarthy drove his first seven laps in the car, with no windscreen and an ill-fitting seat, and posted a time around 8.6 seconds slower than Moreno before stopping with a differential problem.

=== Pre-qualifying classification ===
Pos	No	Driver	Constructor	Time	Gap
1	9	(Italy) Michele Alboreto	Footwork-Mugen-Honda	1:26.865	
2	29	(France) Bertrand Gachot	Venturi-Lamborghini	1:27.407	+0.542
3	30	(Japan) Ukyo Katayama	Venturi-Lamborghini	1:27.601	+0.736
4	14	(Switzerland) Andrea Chiesa	Fondmetal-Ford	1:28.480	+1.615
5	34	(Brazil) Roberto Moreno	Andrea Moda-Judd	1:28.943	+2.078
6	35	(United Kingdom) Perry McCarthy	Andrea Moda-Judd	1:37.537	+10.672

=== Qualifying report ===
In the main qualifying session the Lotus of Mika Häkkinen, the Fondmetal of Andrea Chiesa, and the Brabhams of Damon Hill and Eric van de Poele were eliminated. This turned out to be the only race of 1992 in which Häkkinen failed to qualify.

Mansell took pole position by over a second from Williams team-mate Riccardo Patrese, who crashed at Tamburello corner two weeks before. The McLarens of Ayrton Senna and Gerhard Berger took up the second row, while the Benettons of Michael Schumacher and Martin Brundle filled the third row. The top ten was completed by the Ferraris of Jean Alesi and Ivan Capelli, the Footwork of Michele Alboreto, and the Ligier of Thierry Boutsen.

Mansell's pole position saw one of Formula One's hottest streaks come to an end, as Senna had taken pole in each of the previous seven races at Imola.

=== Qualifying classification ===
Pos	No	Driver	Constructor	Q1	Q2	Gap
1	5	(United Kingdom) Nigel Mansell	Williams-Renault	1:21.842	1:22.440	
2	6	(Italy) Riccardo Patrese	Williams-Renault	1:23.876	1:22.895	+1.053
3	1	(Brazil) Ayrton Senna	McLaren-Honda	1:23.086	1:23.151	+1.244
4	2	(Austria) Gerhard Berger	McLaren-Honda	1:23.418	1:24.393	+1.576
5	19	(Germany) Michael Schumacher	Benetton-Ford	1:23.701	1:24.177	+1.859
6	20	(United Kingdom) Martin Brundle	Benetton-Ford	1:25.239	1:23.904	+2.062
7	27	(France) Jean Alesi	Ferrari	1:23.970	1:24.103	+2.128
8	28	(Italy) Ivan Capelli	Ferrari	1:24.274	1:24.192	+2.350
9	9	(Italy) Michele Alboreto	Footwork-Mugen-Honda	1:24.706	1:26.519	+2.864
10	25	(Belgium) Thierry Boutsen	Ligier-Renault	1:25.043	1:25.276	+3.201
11	10	(Japan) Aguri Suzuki	Footwork-Mugen-Honda	1:25.134	1:25.909	+3.292
12	16	(Austria) Karl Wendlinger	March-Ilmor	1:27.019	1:25.483	+3.641
13	26	(France) Érik Comas	Ligier-Renault	1:25.739	1:25.543	+3.701
14	4	(Italy) Andrea de Cesaris	Tyrrell-Ilmor	1:25.637	1:26.337	+3.795
15	22	(Italy) Pierluigi Martini	Dallara-Ferrari	1:25.838	1:26.331	+3.996
16	21	(Finland) JJ Lehto	Dallara-Ferrari	1:25.865	1:26.215	+4.023
17	30	(Japan) Ukyo Katayama	Venturi-Lamborghini	1:26.900	1:25.982	+4.140
18	33	(Brazil) Maurício Gugelmin	Jordan-Yamaha	1:26.056	1:26.659	+4.214
19	29	(France) Bertrand Gachot	Venturi-Lamborghini	1:26.403	1:26.182	+4.340
20	3	(France) Olivier Grouillard	Tyrrell-Ilmor	1:26.953	1:26.404	+4.562
21	24	(Italy) Gianni Morbidelli	Minardi-Lamborghini	1:26.681	1:27.051	+4.839
22	15	(Italy) Gabriele Tarquini	Fondmetal-Ford	1:26.959	1:26.765	+4.923
23	32	(Italy) Stefano Modena	Jordan-Yamaha	1:26.900	1:26.774	+4.932
24	17	(France) Paul Belmondo	March-Ilmor	1:28.515	1:27.194	+5.352
25	23	(Brazil) Christian Fittipaldi	Minardi-Lamborghini	1:27.229	1:27.282	+5.387
26	12	(United Kingdom) Johnny Herbert	Lotus-Ford	1:27.270	1:27.357	+5.428
27	11	(Finland) Mika Häkkinen	Lotus-Ford	1:27.437	1:27.912	+5.595
28	14	(Switzerland) Andrea Chiesa	Fondmetal-Ford	1:27.756	no time	+5.914
29	8	(United Kingdom) Damon Hill	Brabham-Judd	no time	1:28.423	+6.581
30	7	(Belgium) Eric van de Poele	Brabham-Judd	1:29.347	1:28.832	+6.990

== Race ==
=== Race report ===
The first start was aborted due to Karl Wendlinger's March stalling; he eventually started the race at the back of the grid. Stefano Modena started from the pit lane in his Jordan.

Mansell led every lap, finishing nearly ten seconds ahead of Patrese. Senna finished third, nearly forty seconds behind Patrese, but was unable to take his place on the podium due to discomfort he suffered all race, and was unable to get out of his car until long after the race ended; he had pulled off right after crossing the finish line, not even bothering to take a cool down lap. Ivan Capelli in the second Ferrari spun off into the gravel trap ending his race on lap 12. Michael Schumacher saw his first retirement of the season on lap 21 as he and teammate Brundle were pressuring Berger and spun out into the tyre wall on lap 21 with left suspension damage; despite fixing the problem on the front, the damage to the rear was too much and he retired in the pits only one lap later. On lap 40, Senna passed Jean Alesi going into the Villeneuve corner; Berger tried to do the same thing through Tosa, but Alesi closed the door and clipped Berger's car, lost control and clipped Berger's car again, damaging the McLaren's right rear suspension and destroying the Ferrari's front wing, forcing both drivers to retire; each side blamed the other for the accident. Mansell's win continued his perfect start to the 1992 season, with five wins from the opening five races; this broke the record of successive wins from the start of the season set by Senna the previous year.

Brundle finished fourth to pick up his first points of 1992. Alboreto finished fifth, and Pierluigi Martini finished sixth, scoring what would prove to be the Dallara team's last point in Formula One.

=== Race classification ===
Pos	No	Driver	Constructor	Laps	Time/Retired	Grid	Points
1	5	(United Kingdom) Nigel Mansell	Williams-Renault	60	1:28:40.927	1	10
2	6	(Italy) Riccardo Patrese	Williams-Renault	60	+ 9.451	2	6
3	1	(Brazil) Ayrton Senna	McLaren-Honda	60	+ 48.984	3	4
4	20	(United Kingdom) Martin Brundle	Benetton-Ford	60	+ 53.007	6	3
5	9	(Italy) Michele Alboreto	Footwork-Mugen-Honda	59	+ 1 lap	9	2
6	22	(Italy) Pierluigi Martini	Dallara-Ferrari	59	+ 1 lap	15	1
7	33	(Brazil) Maurício Gugelmin	Jordan-Yamaha	58	+ 2 laps	18	
8	3	(France) Olivier Grouillard	Tyrrell-Ilmor	58	+ 2 laps	20	
9	26	(France) Érik Comas	Ligier-Renault	58	+ 2 laps	13	
10	10	(Japan) Aguri Suzuki	Footwork-Mugen-Honda	58	+ 2 laps	11	
11	21	(Finland) JJ Lehto	Dallara-Ferrari	57	Engine	16	
12	16	(Austria) Karl Wendlinger	March-Ilmor	57	+ 3 laps	12	
13	17	(France) Paul Belmondo	March-Ilmor	57	+ 3 laps	24	
14	4	(Italy) Andrea de Cesaris	Tyrrell-Ilmor	55	Fuel system	14	
Ret	30	(Japan) Ukyo Katayama	Venturi-Lamborghini	40	Spun off	17	
Ret	27	(France) Jean Alesi	Ferrari	39	Collision	7	
Ret	2	(Austria) Gerhard Berger	McLaren-Honda	39	Collision	4	
Ret	29	(France) Bertrand Gachot	Venturi-Lamborghini	32	Spun off	19	
Ret	25	(Belgium) Thierry Boutsen	Ligier-Renault	29	Engine	10	
Ret	32	(Italy) Stefano Modena	Jordan-Yamaha	25	Gearbox	23	
Ret	24	(Italy) Gianni Morbidelli	Minardi-Lamborghini	24	Engine	21	
Ret	15	(Italy) Gabriele Tarquini	Fondmetal-Ford	24	Engine	22	
Ret	19	(Germany) Michael Schumacher	Benetton-Ford	20	Suspension	5	
Ret	28	(Italy) Ivan Capelli	Ferrari	11	Spun off	8	
Ret	23	(Brazil) Christian Fittipaldi	Minardi-Lamborghini	8	Gearbox	25	
Ret	12	(United Kingdom) Johnny Herbert	Lotus-Ford	8	Gearbox	26	
DNQ	11	(Finland) Mika Häkkinen	Lotus-Ford				
DNQ	14	(Switzerland) Andrea Chiesa	Fondmetal-Ford				
DNQ	8	(United Kingdom) Damon Hill	Brabham-Judd				
DNQ	7	(Belgium) Eric van de Poele	Brabham-Judd				
DNPQ	34	(Brazil) Roberto Moreno	Andrea Moda-Judd				
DNPQ	35	(United Kingdom) Perry McCarthy	Andrea Moda-Judd				

== Championship standings after the race ==
Drivers' Championship standings

	Pos	Driver	Points
	1	(United Kingdom) Nigel Mansell	50
	2	(Italy) Riccardo Patrese	24
	3	(Germany) Michael Schumacher	17
2	4	(Brazil) Ayrton Senna	8
1	5	(Austria) Gerhard Berger	8

Constructors' Championship standings

Pos	Constructor	Points
1	(United Kingdom) Williams-Renault	74
2	(United Kingdom) Benetton-Ford	20
3	(United Kingdom) McLaren-Honda	16
4	(Italy) Ferrari	9
5	(United Kingdom) Footwork-Mugen-Honda	5

- Note: Only the top five positions are included for both sets of standings.

Previous race: 1992 Spanish Grand Prix	FIA Formula One World Championship; 1992 season	Next race: 1992 Monaco Grand Prix
Previous race: 1991 San Marino Grand Prix	San Marino Grand Prix	Next race: 1993 San Marino Grand Prix
