= 1992 Hungarian Grand Prix =

Formula One motor race

- Race 11 of 16 in the 1992 Formula One World Championship

Race details
- Date: 16 August 1992
- Official name: Marlboro Magyar Nagydíj
- Location: Hungaroring, Mogyoród, Pest, Hungary
- Course: Permanent race track
- Course length: 3.968 km (2.466 miles)
- Distance: 77 laps, 305.536 km (189.851 miles)
- Weather: Dry

Pole position
Driver	(Italy) Riccardo Patrese	Williams-Renault
- Time: 1:15.476

Fastest lap
Driver	(United Kingdom) Nigel Mansell	Williams-Renault
- Time: 1:18.308 on lap 63

Podium
First	(Brazil) Ayrton Senna	McLaren-Honda
Second	(United Kingdom) Nigel Mansell	Williams-Renault
Third	(Austria) Gerhard Berger	McLaren-Honda

The 1992 Hungarian Grand Prix was a Formula One motor race held at Hungaroring on 16 August 1992. It was the eleventh race of the 1992 Formula One World Championship. The 77-lap race was won by Brazilian driver Ayrton Senna, driving a McLaren-Honda. Briton Nigel Mansell finished second in his Williams-Renault to clinch the Drivers' Championship with five races still to run, with Austrian Gerhard Berger third in the other McLaren-Honda.

At the time, it was the earliest moment in Formula One history the championship has been clinched before the final race. That record would be broken ten years later at the 2002 French Grand Prix when Michael Schumacher clinched the 2002 World Championship six races early. The race also marked the final appearance of the Brabham team, which had been competing in Formula One since 1962 and had won four Drivers' Championships and two Constructors' Championships. Ferrari celebrated its 500th entry, although its official 500th entry was at the next round in Belgium. Ivan Capelli scored his last point for Ferrari, as well as the last point of his career.

== Background ==
Ferrari celebrated its 500th start in a World Championship event as a team, even though Ferrari did not participate in the 1950 French Grand Prix and Peter Whitehead's privateer entry in this race does not count towards the team's participation tally. Although its official 500th entry was at the 1992 Belgian Grand Prix, Ferrari celebrated it in Hungary due to counting Alberto Ascari entry at the 1952 Indy 500. Until 1960, the Indianapolis 500 was considered a round of the World Championship, albeit for reasons more symbolic than logical.

== Qualifying ==
=== Pre-qualifying report ===
After the German Grand Prix, the Fondmetal team replaced Andrea Chiesa with Brabham driver Eric van de Poele. Brabham did not replace van de Poele and reduced their entry to one car. This meant the pre-qualifying pool could be reduced by one, and thus Larrousse driver Bertrand Gachot was no longer required to pre-qualify.

The session proved practically unnecessary as the Andrea Moda team again did not make a serious attempt to run their second car, which was driven by Perry McCarthy. His teammate Roberto Moreno had used both cars to pre-qualify, and McCarthy was only allowed to leave the pits 45 seconds before the end of the session, leaving him no chance to reach the start-finish line to begin a timed lap before the chequered flag was waved. This being the latest in a succession of similar incidents, the Fédération Internationale du Sport Automobile formally warned Andrea Moda to make a proper effort to run both cars at the next Grand Prix at Spa-Francorchamps, or face suspension from the following event.

The other four cars in the session thus all pre-qualified, with the Fondmetals taking the first two places as Gabriele Tarquini outpaced van de Poele by nearly a second. Ukyo Katayama was another second further back in the remaining Larrousse, with Moreno 1.1 seconds slower in fourth, only his second pre-qualification success this season. McCarthy was the sole entrant to fail to pre-qualify. After the race, the Brabham team withdrew entirely, removing the necessity for further pre-qualifying sessions. To date, this pre-qualifying session was the last to be held in Formula One.

=== Pre-qualifying classification ===
Pos	No	Driver	Constructor	Time	Gap
1	15	(Italy) Gabriele Tarquini	Fondmetal-Ford	1:22.412	—
2	14	(Belgium) Eric van de Poele	Fondmetal-Ford	1:23.398	+0.986
3	30	(Japan) Ukyo Katayama	Venturi-Lamborghini	1:24.421	+2.009
4	34	(Brazil) Roberto Moreno	Andrea Moda-Judd	1:25.567	+3.155
5	35	(United Kingdom) Perry McCarthy	Andrea Moda-Judd	no time	—

=== Qualifying report ===
This was the chance for Williams to seal both titles and they were dominant, but it was Riccardo Patrese who took pole ahead of teammate Nigel Mansell, Ayrton Senna, Michael Schumacher, Gerhard Berger, and Martin Brundle.

=== Qualifying classification ===
Pos	No	Driver	Constructor	Q1	Q2	Gap
1	6	(Italy) Riccardo Patrese	Williams-Renault	1:15.476	1:15.725	
2	5	(United Kingdom) Nigel Mansell	Williams-Renault	1:15.643	1:15.950	+0.167
3	1	(Brazil) Ayrton Senna	McLaren-Honda	1:16.467	1:16.267	+0.791
4	19	(Germany) Michael Schumacher	Benetton-Ford	1:17.070	1:16.524	+1.048
5	2	(Austria) Gerhard Berger	McLaren-Honda	1:17.277	1:17.414	+1.801
6	20	(United Kingdom) Martin Brundle	Benetton-Ford	1:18.843	1:18.148	+2.672
7	9	(Italy) Michele Alboreto	Footwork-Mugen-Honda	1:20.538	1:18.604	+3.128
8	25	(Belgium) Thierry Boutsen	Ligier-Renault	1:18.799	1:18.616	+3.140
9	27	(France) Jean Alesi	Ferrari	1:19.511	1:18.665	+3.189
10	28	(Italy) Ivan Capelli	Ferrari	1:19.313	1:18.765	+3.289
11	26	(France) Érik Comas	Ligier-Renault	1:19.193	1:18.902	+3.426
12	15	(Italy) Gabriele Tarquini	Fondmetal-Ford	1:19.555	1:19.123	+3.647
13	12	(United Kingdom) Johnny Herbert	Lotus-Ford	1:19.555	1:19.143	+3.667
14	10	(Japan) Aguri Suzuki	Footwork-Mugen-Honda	1:21.064	1:19.200	+3.724
15	29	(France) Bertrand Gachot	Venturi-Lamborghini	1:19.819	1:19.365	+3.889
16	11	(Finland) Mika Häkkinen	Lotus-Ford	1:19.587	1:20.390	+4.111
17	17	(France) Paul Belmondo	March-Ilmor	1:21.781	1:19.626	+4.150
18	14	(Belgium) Eric van de Poele	Fondmetal-Ford	1:21.741	1:19.776	+4.300
19	4	(Italy) Andrea de Cesaris	Tyrrell-Ilmor	1:20.003	1:19.867	+4.391
20	30	(Japan) Ukyo Katayama	Venturi-Lamborghini	1:20.209	1:19.990	+4.514
21	33	(Brazil) Maurício Gugelmin	Jordan-Yamaha	1:20.481	1:20.023	+4.547
22	3	(France) Olivier Grouillard	Tyrrell-Ilmor	1:21.193	1:20.063	+4.587
23	16	(Austria) Karl Wendlinger	March-Ilmor	1:21.116	1:20.315	+4.839
24	32	(Italy) Stefano Modena	Jordan-Yamaha	1:20.819	1:20.707	+5.231
25	8	(United Kingdom) Damon Hill	Brabham-Judd	1:22.369	1:20.781	+5.305
26	22	(Italy) Pierluigi Martini	Dallara-Ferrari	1:22.731	1:20.988	+5.512
27	24	(Italy) Gianni Morbidelli	Minardi-Lamborghini	1:22.176	1:21.246	+5.770
28	21	(Finland) JJ Lehto	Dallara-Ferrari	1:22.364	1:21.288	+5.812
29	23	(Italy) Alessandro Zanardi	Minardi-Lamborghini	1:21.756	No time	+6.280
30	34	(Brazil) Roberto Moreno	Andrea Moda-Judd	1:22.286	1:22.870	+6.810

== Race ==
=== Race report ===
At the start, Gerhard Berger passed Michael Schumacher, and then Mansell lost momentum and Senna passed him with Berger following his teammate through. The order was Patrese, Senna, Berger, Mansell, Schumacher, and Brundle. There was a collision on the first lap between Érik Comas, Johnny Herbert, Thierry Boutsen, and Gabriele Tarquini who all retired on the first lap (meaning both Ligiers of Comas and Boutsen retired on the first lap), before Eric van de Poele spun into retirement at the first corner on lap 3 as both Fondmetals retired after only two laps. Mansell passed Berger on lap 8 and set off after Senna. As hard as he tried, the combination of the small circuit and Senna's skills in defending meant that he could not pass.

Another multi-car collision came on lap 14, which eliminated Bertrand Gachot, Aguri Suzuki, Olivier Grouillard, Karl Wendlinger, and Stefano Modena (forcing all five drivers to retire on the same lap). Alesi in the leading Ferrari behind the leading pack spun out with the rear wheels in the gravel trap by lap 15. After these accidents, which took place in three separate sections of the track, Modena's disabled Jordan blocking turn 13 was the most precariously positioned cars of all, the SC sign meaning the safety car was going to be deployed for the first time since the SC rule had been in place. Double yellow flags were waved around the track. Controversially, no further action was taken, and the safety car was never deployed. Murray Walker and James Hunt in the BBC booth phrased the situation "shambolic". On lap 31, Mansell made a mistake and went wide and rejoined behind Berger, just in the very moment when Walker was talking about the track not providing any overtaking opportunities. Two laps later, Mansell passed Berger to get back third. A pivotal movement came on lap 39 when Patrese spun off going into turn 3. He rejoined in seventh, outside the points, which meant that Mansell would be the world champion if results stayed the same. On lap 61, Mansell had to go to the pits with tyre troubles and rejoined in sixth, just ahead of Patrese. Mansell quickly passed Mika Häkkinen but before Patrese, who was right behind could take sixth, Patrese's engine blew. He was out and would get no points.

Mansell quickly caught and passed Brundle on lap 60 and four laps later, he was up to third when Schumacher's rear wing broke on his Benetton, spinning him out and retired on lap 64. Senna, a minute at the front, made a precautionary stop just as Häkkinen passed Brundle for fourth. Mansell passed Berger for second and now had a toehold on the championship. Soon afterwards, Häkkinen tried to pass Berger and spun into Brundle's path. Brundle was forced to spin to avoid a collision and both rejoined without losing places, with Häkkinen staying ahead. Senna won ahead of new world champion Mansell, Berger, Häkkinen, Brundle, and Ivan Capelli. Mansell became world champion with five races remaining.

=== Race classification ===
Pos	No	Driver	Constructor	Laps	Time/Retired	Grid	Points
1	1	(Brazil) Ayrton Senna	McLaren-Honda	77	1:46:19.216	3	10
2	5	(United Kingdom) Nigel Mansell	Williams-Renault	77	+ 40.139	2	6
3	2	(Austria) Gerhard Berger	McLaren-Honda	77	+ 50.782	5	4
4	11	(Finland) Mika Häkkinen	Lotus-Ford	77	+ 54.313	16	3
5	20	(United Kingdom) Martin Brundle	Benetton-Ford	77	+ 57.498	6	2
6	28	(Italy) Ivan Capelli	Ferrari	76	+ 1 lap	10	1
7	9	(Italy) Michele Alboreto	Footwork-Mugen-Honda	75	+ 2 laps	7	
8	4	(Italy) Andrea de Cesaris	Tyrrell-Ilmor	75	+ 2 laps	19	
9	17	(France) Paul Belmondo	March-Ilmor	74	+ 3 laps	17	
10	33	(Brazil) Maurício Gugelmin	Jordan-Yamaha	73	+ 4 laps	21	
11	8	(United Kingdom) Damon Hill	Brabham-Judd	73	+ 4 laps	25	
Ret	19	(Germany) Michael Schumacher	Benetton-Ford	63	Broken wing	4	
Ret	6	(Italy) Riccardo Patrese	Williams-Renault	55	Engine	1	
Ret	22	(Italy) Pierluigi Martini	Dallara-Ferrari	40	Gearbox	26	
Ret	30	(Japan) Ukyo Katayama	Venturi-Lamborghini	35	Engine	20	
Ret	27	(France) Jean Alesi	Ferrari	14	Spun off	9	
Ret	29	(France) Bertrand Gachot	Venturi-Lamborghini	13	Collision	15	
Ret	10	(Japan) Aguri Suzuki	Footwork-Mugen-Honda	13	Collision	14	
Ret	3	(France) Olivier Grouillard	Tyrrell-Ilmor	13	Collision	22	
Ret	16	(Austria) Karl Wendlinger	March-Ilmor	13	Collision	23	
Ret	32	(Italy) Stefano Modena	Jordan-Yamaha	13	Collision	24	
Ret	14	(Belgium) Eric van de Poele	Fondmetal-Ford	2	Spun off	18	
Ret	25	(Belgium) Thierry Boutsen	Ligier-Renault	0	Collision	8	
Ret	26	(France) Érik Comas	Ligier-Renault	0	Collision	11	
Ret	15	(Italy) Gabriele Tarquini	Fondmetal-Ford	0	Collision	12	
Ret	12	(United Kingdom) Johnny Herbert	Lotus-Ford	0	Collision	13	
DNQ	24	(Italy) Gianni Morbidelli	Minardi-Lamborghini				
DNQ	21	(Finland) JJ Lehto	Dallara-Ferrari				
DNQ	23	(Italy) Alessandro Zanardi	Minardi-Lamborghini				
DNQ	34	(Brazil) Roberto Moreno	Andrea Moda-Judd				
DNPQ	35	(United Kingdom) Perry McCarthy	Andrea Moda-Judd				

== Championship standings after the race ==
Drivers' Championship standings

	Pos	Driver	Points
	1	(United Kingdom) **Nigel Mansell**	92
	2	(Italy) Riccardo Patrese	40
1	3	(Brazil) Ayrton Senna	34
1	4	(Germany) Michael Schumacher	33
	5	(Austria) Gerhard Berger	24

Constructors' Championship standings

	Pos	Constructor	Points
	1	(United Kingdom) **Williams-Renault***	132
1	2	(United Kingdom) **McLaren-Honda***	58
1	3	(United Kingdom) Benetton-Ford	51
	4	(Italy) Ferrari	16
	5	(United Kingdom) Lotus-Ford	10

- Note: Only the top five positions are included for both sets of standings.
- **Bold text** indicates the 1992 World Drivers' Champion.
- Competitors in bold and marked with an asterisk still had a mathematical chance of becoming World Champion.

Previous race: 1992 German Grand Prix	FIA Formula One World Championship; 1992 season	Next race: 1992 Belgian Grand Prix
Previous race: 1991 Hungarian Grand Prix	Hungarian Grand Prix	Next race: 1993 Hungarian Grand Prix
