= 1992 French Grand Prix =

- Race 8 of 16 in the 1992 Formula One World Championship

Race details
- Date: 5 July 1992
- Official name: Rhône-Poulenc Grand Prix de France
- Location: Circuit de Nevers Magny-Cours; Magny-Cours, France
- Course: Permanent racing facility
- Course length: 4.250 km (2.651 miles)
- Distance: 69 laps, 293.250 km (182.938 miles)
- Scheduled distance: 72 laps, 306.000 km (190.892 miles)
- Weather: Dry, then raining

Pole position
Driver	(United Kingdom) Nigel Mansell	Williams-Renault
- Time: 1:13.864

Fastest lap
Driver	(United Kingdom) Nigel Mansell	Williams-Renault
- Time: 1:17.070 on lap 37

Podium
First	(United Kingdom) Nigel Mansell	Williams-Renault
Second	(Italy) Riccardo Patrese	Williams-Renault
Third	(United Kingdom) Martin Brundle	Benetton-Ford

The 1992 French Grand Prix was a Formula One motor race held at Magny-Cours on 5 July 1992. It was the eighth race of the 1992 Formula One World Championship.

The 69-lap race was won by Briton Nigel Mansell, driving a Williams-Renault, after he started from pole position. Mansell took his sixth victory of the season by 46 seconds from his Italian teammate, Riccardo Patrese, who led the first 18 laps. Another Briton, Martin Brundle, finished third in a Benetton-Ford. Friday's planned pre-qualifying session for the event was cancelled after the Andrea Moda team failed to turn up at the circuit.

== Pre-race ==
The usual Friday morning pre-qualifying session was cancelled when the Andrea Moda Formula team failed to arrive at the circuit. The team's transporter had been stuck in traffic due to a blockade by French lorry drivers, and although all the other teams had also been affected, Andrea Moda were the only team to fail to arrive; all others used alternate routes to reach the circuit. The remaining four cars in the pre-qualifying pool therefore progressed automatically to the main qualifying sessions.

== Qualifying ==
=== Qualifying report ===
Again the Williams-Renaults filled the front row of the grid, Nigel Mansell taking pole position by nearly half a second from Riccardo Patrese. On the second row were the McLaren-Hondas of Ayrton Senna and Gerhard Berger, Senna's time over 1.3 seconds slower than Mansell's. On the third row were Michael Schumacher in the Benetton and Jean Alesi in the Ferrari, and on the fourth row were their respective teammates, Martin Brundle and Ivan Capelli. In the Ligier team's home race, Thierry Boutsen and Érik Comas filled the fifth row, and on the sixth were the Lotuses of Mika Häkkinen and Johnny Herbert.

Christian Fittipaldi failed to qualify after he crashed his Minardi heavily at the Imola chicane, fracturing his fifth vertebra. He was joined in non-qualification by Paul Belmondo in the March and the two Brabhams of Eric van de Poele and Damon Hill.

=== Qualifying classification ===
Pos	No	Driver	Constructor	Q1	Q2	Gap
1	5	(United Kingdom) Nigel Mansell	Williams-Renault	1:15.047	1:13.864	
2	6	(Italy) Riccardo Patrese	Williams-Renault	1:15.551	1:14.332	+0.468
3	1	(Brazil) Ayrton Senna	McLaren-Honda	1:16.892	1:15.199	+1.335
4	2	(Austria) Gerhard Berger	McLaren-Honda	1:16.944	1:15.316	+1.452
5	19	(Germany) Michael Schumacher	Benetton-Ford	1:16.969	1:15.569	+1.705
6	27	(France) Jean Alesi	Ferrari	1:17.686	1:16.118	+2.254
7	20	(United Kingdom) Martin Brundle	Benetton-Ford	1:17.638	1:16.151	+2.287
8	28	(Italy) Ivan Capelli	Ferrari	1:18.152	1:16.443	+2.579
9	25	(Belgium) Thierry Boutsen	Ligier-Renault	1:18.179	1:16.806	+2.942
10	26	(France) Érik Comas	Ligier-Renault	1:17.637	1:16.938	+3.074
11	11	(Finland) Mika Häkkinen	Lotus-Ford	1:18.327	1:16.999	+3.135
12	12	(United Kingdom) Johnny Herbert	Lotus-Ford	1:18.168	1:17.257	+3.393
13	29	(France) Bertrand Gachot	Venturi-Lamborghini	1:18.864	1:17.442	+3.578
14	9	(Italy) Michele Alboreto	Footwork-Mugen-Honda	1:19.291	1:17.508	+3.644
15	10	(Japan) Aguri Suzuki	Footwork-Mugen-Honda	1:19.022	1:17.548	+3.684
16	24	(Italy) Gianni Morbidelli	Minardi-Lamborghini	1:19.110	1:17.667	+3.803
17	21	(Finland) JJ Lehto	Dallara-Ferrari	1:19.279	1:17.677	+3.813
18	30	(Japan) Ukyo Katayama	Venturi-Lamborghini	1:19.819	1:17.709	+3.845
19	4	(Italy) Andrea de Cesaris	Tyrrell-Ilmor	1:20.029	1:17.868	+4.004
20	32	(Italy) Stefano Modena	Jordan-Yamaha	1:18.905	1:17.901	+4.037
21	16	(Austria) Karl Wendlinger	March-Ilmor	1:18.596	1:17.937	+4.073
22	3	(France) Olivier Grouillard	Tyrrell-Ilmor	1:19.204	1:17.989	+4.125
23	15	(Italy) Gabriele Tarquini	Fondmetal-Ford	1:19.146	1:17.993	+4.129
24	33	(Brazil) Maurício Gugelmin	Jordan-Yamaha	1:19.574	1:18.337	+4.473
25	22	(Italy) Pierluigi Martini	Dallara-Ferrari	1:18.634	1:18.586	+4.722
26	14	(Switzerland) Andrea Chiesa	Fondmetal-Ford	1:19.835	1:18.701	+4.837
27	17	(France) Paul Belmondo	March-Ilmor	1:19.963	1:19.354	+5.490
28	23	(Brazil) Christian Fittipaldi	Minardi-Lamborghini	1:20.062	no time	+6.198
29	7	(Belgium) Eric van de Poele	Brabham-Judd	1:21.594	1:20.139	+6.275
30	8	(United Kingdom) Damon Hill	Brabham-Judd	1:21.412	1:22.495	+7.548

== Race ==
=== Race report ===
At the start, Patrese got by Mansell while Berger got ahead of Senna and Martin Brundle was able to sneak by Alesi. At the Adelaide hairpin, Schumacher tried to pass Senna but instead hit him, taking Senna out and forcing himself to pit. Meanwhile, Patrese and Mansell were side by side but Patrese kept the lead. Patrese led Mansell, Berger, Brundle, Alesi and Häkkinen.

Nothing changed until lap 11 when Berger's engine failed. Soon afterwards it began to rain so heavily that the race was stopped. After some time the rain decreased and the grid formed up again. The race would be decided on the aggregate times of both parts of the race. Patrese took the lead again with Alesi getting ahead of Mika Häkkinen's Lotus as well. Mansell tried to pass his teammate again but Patrese defended and once again kept the lead. Further back, Schumacher again tried too hard, hitting Stefano Modena in the Jordan, dropping out of the race with a broken front suspension. Patrese led Mansell, Brundle, Alesi, Häkkinen and Comas on aggregate. Patrese then waved Mansell through on track and soon Mansell got ahead on aggregate. When Patrese was quizzed after the race on whether team orders existed in the Williams team he refused to comment.

It began to rain again and everyone pitted for wets with Alesi leaving the change too late and dropping down to sixth. His engine failed on lap 61. Mansell won with Patrese making it a Williams 1-2 ahead of Brundle, Häkkinen, Comas and Herbert. This was Brundle's first podium; he had been disqualified from his podium finish at the 1984 Detroit Grand Prix.

Thus, at the halfway stage of the season, Mansell led the championship with 66 points compared to Patrese's 34. Schumacher was third with 26, Senna was fourth with 18, Berger was fifth with 18, Alesi was sixth with 11, Brundle was seventh with nine and Alboreto was eighth with five. In the constructors championship, Williams had 100 points and were well ahead of the field: McLaren were second with 36, Benetton were third with 35 and Ferrari were fourth with 13.

Due to his sabbatical from Formula One in 1992, the race was only the second time since he first appeared on the podium for his home race in 1981 that Alain Prost was not on the podium for the French Grand Prix. Prost had won the French GP in 1981, 1983, 1988, 1989 and 1990. He was second in 1982, 1986 and 1991, and finished third in 1985 and 1987. The only podium he missed from 1981-1991 was at Dijon in 1984 when he finished seventh after problems with a loose wheel.

=== Race classification ===
Pos	No	Driver	Constructor	Laps	Time/Retired	Grid	Points
1	5	(United Kingdom) Nigel Mansell	Williams-Renault	69	1:38:08.459	1	10
2	6	(Italy) Riccardo Patrese	Williams-Renault	69	+ 46.447	2	6
3	20	(United Kingdom) Martin Brundle	Benetton-Ford	69	+ 1:12.579	7	4
4	11	(Finland) Mika Häkkinen	Lotus-Ford	68	+ 1 lap	11	3
5	26	(France) Érik Comas	Ligier-Renault	68	+ 1 lap	10	2
6	12	(United Kingdom) Johnny Herbert	Lotus-Ford	68	+ 1 lap	12	1
7	9	(Italy) Michele Alboreto	Footwork-Mugen-Honda	68	+ 1 lap	14	
8	24	(Italy) Gianni Morbidelli	Minardi-Lamborghini	68	+ 1 lap	16	
9	21	(Finland) JJ Lehto	Dallara-Ferrari	67	+ 2 laps	17	
10	22	(Italy) Pierluigi Martini	Dallara-Ferrari	67	+ 2 laps	25	
11	3	(France) Olivier Grouillard	Tyrrell-Ilmor	66	+ 3 laps	22	
Ret	27	(France) Jean Alesi	Ferrari	61	Engine	6	
Ret	4	(Italy) Andrea de Cesaris	Tyrrell-Ilmor	51	Spun off	19	
Ret	30	(Japan) Ukyo Katayama	Venturi-Lamborghini	49	Engine	18	
Ret	25	(Belgium) Thierry Boutsen	Ligier-Renault	46	Spun off	9	
Ret	28	(Italy) Ivan Capelli	Ferrari	38	Engine	8	
Ret	16	(Austria) Karl Wendlinger	March-Ilmor	33	Gearbox	21	
Ret	32	(Italy) Stefano Modena	Jordan-Yamaha	25	Engine	20	
Ret	10	(Japan) Aguri Suzuki	Footwork-Mugen-Honda	20	Spun off	15	
Ret	19	(Germany) Michael Schumacher	Benetton-Ford	17	Collision	5	
Ret	2	(Austria) Gerhard Berger	McLaren-Honda	10	Engine	4	
Ret	15	(Italy) Gabriele Tarquini	Fondmetal-Ford	6	Throttle	23	
Ret	1	(Brazil) Ayrton Senna	McLaren-Honda	0	Collision	3	
Ret	29	(France) Bertrand Gachot	Venturi-Lamborghini	0	Collision	13	
Ret	33	(Brazil) Maurício Gugelmin	Jordan-Yamaha	0	Collision	24	
Ret	14	(Switzerland) Andrea Chiesa	Fondmetal-Ford	0	Collision	26	
DNQ	17	(France) Paul Belmondo	March-Ilmor				
DNQ	23	(Brazil) Christian Fittipaldi	Minardi-Lamborghini				
DNQ	7	(Belgium) Eric van de Poele	Brabham-Judd				
DNQ	8	(United Kingdom) Damon Hill	Brabham-Judd				

== Championship standings after the race ==
Drivers' Championship standings

Pos	Driver	Points
1	(United Kingdom) Nigel Mansell	66
2	(Italy) Riccardo Patrese	34
3	(Germany) Michael Schumacher	26
4	(Brazil) Ayrton Senna	18
5	(Austria) Gerhard Berger	18

Constructors' Championship standings

	Pos	Constructor	Points
	1	(United Kingdom) Williams-Renault	100
	2	(United Kingdom) McLaren-Honda	36
	3	(United Kingdom) Benetton-Ford	35
	4	(Italy) Ferrari	13
3	5	(United Kingdom) Lotus-Ford	6

- Note: Only the top five positions are included for both sets of standings.

Previous race: 1992 Canadian Grand Prix	FIA Formula One World Championship; 1992 season	Next race: 1992 British Grand Prix
Previous race: 1991 French Grand Prix	French Grand Prix	Next race: 1993 French Grand Prix
Awards
Preceded by 1991 French Grand Prix	Formula One Promotional Trophy for Race Promoter; 1992	Succeeded by 1993 European Grand Prix
