= Andrea Sassetti =

Italian shoe designer and businessman (born 1960)

Andrea Sassetti (born 1960) is an Italian shoe designer, owner of the Italian fashion company Andrea Moda, a brand of high-end women's shoes. Born in Fermo, he was also the owner of a Formula One motor racing team Andrea Moda Formula in 1992. The origin of Sassetti's fortune remain blurred; some sources attribute it to his father, Silvano Sassetti, a wealthy shoe manufacturer. Others suggest that he won a huge sum playing poker in the 1980s or hint at links with the mafia and illegal trade. According to a telephone interview published on the internet, Sassetti was born into a family of poor peasants who grew rich by working and earning money through gambling.

When preparing for the 1992 Formula One World Championship, the headquarters of Andrea Moda Formula was installed in the former workshops of the Coloni team, Passignano sul Trasimeno, a small town in central Italy. The new team, which had forty employees, continued to use the materials from the old team; according to several observers, Sassetti had very little, if any, additional funding invested in improving the infrastructure, which could have denoted a lack of seriousness of the new racing structure.

In January 1992, in order to complete his racing staff, Sassetti set out to recruit, among others, a mechanic and truck driver from among the workers at his shoe factory. During 1992, a suspected case of arson destroyed Sassetti's discothèque on the east coast of Italy, and as he fled from the flames, a gunman shot at him but missed. He now runs restaurants and nightclubs, and is involved in the construction business. Still interested in the sport, he had a home until the early 2000s with the two original Andrea Moda S921 cars; the cars subsequently disappeared.
