= Ford-Cosworth HB engine =

Ford-Cosworth HB
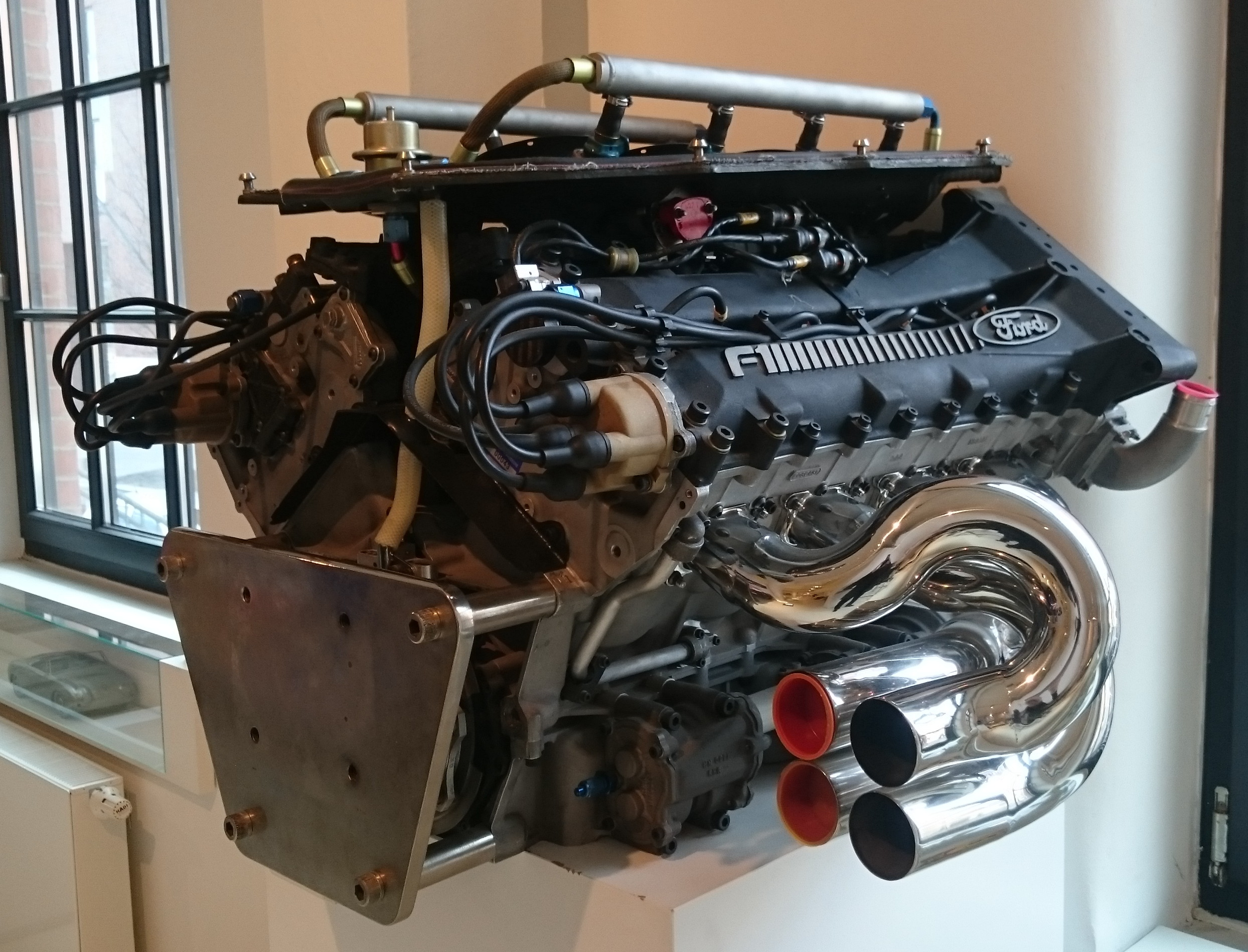
- 1991 Ford-Cosworth HB-V

Overview
- Manufacturer: (United Kingdom) Ford-Cosworth
- Designer: Geoff Goddard; John Hancock
- Production: 1989–1994

Layout
- Configuration: 75° V8
- Displacement: 3.5 L (3,497.6 cc)
- Cylinder bore: 94 mm (3.7 in)
- Piston stroke: 63 mm (2.5 in)
- Valvetrain: 32-valve, DOHC, four-valves per cylinder

Combustion
- Turbocharger: No
- Fuel system: Indirect fuel injection
- Fuel type: Gasoline
- Oil system: Dry sump

Output
- Power output: 630–730 hp (470–544 kW)
- Torque output: 260–325 lb⋅ft (353–441 N⋅m)

Chronology
- Predecessor: Cosworth DFR
- Successor: Ford-Cosworth EC / ED engine

The HB is a series of 3.5-litre, naturally-aspirated V8 Formula One racing engines, designed, developed and produced by Cosworth, in partnership with Ford; and used between 1989 and 1994. The customer engines were used by Benetton, Fondmetal, McLaren, Lotus, Minardi, Footwork, Simtek, and Larrousse.

== Origin ==
=== Rebooting in the new naturally-aspirated engine formula ===
The British engine manufacturer Cosworth, founded in 1958 by Keith Duckworth and Mike Costin, was represented in the Formula 1 World Championship for 17 years from 1967 with the 3.0-litre naturally aspirated DFV engine. Funded by Ford, the DFV was freely available and dominated Formula 1 in the 1970s. With 155 world championship races won, 12 driver's and 10 constructor's titles between 1967 and 1983, it is the most successful engine in the history of Formula 1. During this time, no other manufacturer was able to design a similarly competitive naturally aspirated engine. Only with the advent of turbo engines in 1977 did the DFV gradually fall behind. In the early 1980s, Formula 1 teams gradually switched to turbo engines; in the 1986 season, all engines were limited to 1.5 litres displacement regardless of the induction method, effectively mandating the use of turbocharged engines. Cosworth had the turbocharged GBA V6 engine in its range, which, unlike the DFV, was only available to selected customers. When the FIA surprisingly decided in October 1986 to allow conventional naturally aspirated engines - now with 3.5 litres displacement - in addition to the turbos from the 1987 season, Cosworth was the only engine manufacturer who was able to react to this rule change at short notice. From the DFV block designed in 1966, a 3.5-litre variant was developed within three months, which was given the designation DFZ. The quickly built DFZ was an interim solution. In 1988 the further developed version DFR, which was still based on the DFV, appeared. In its first year, Benetton received the DFR engine exclusively, after which it was used in various versions until 1991 by 14 mostly smaller teams as a customer engine.

=== Factory and customer engines ===
Ford and Cosworth recognized early on that the DFR could not compete permanently with the new ten and twelve-cylinder engines from Ferrari, Honda, or Renault. Therefore, at the beginning of 1988, the decision was made to develop a completely new naturally aspirated engine. After defining the concept, the first drawings of the engine known as HB were made in May 1988, in December 1988 the first blocks ran on the test bench, and at the French Grand Prix in July 1989 the HB went into racing.

According to the original plans, the HB engines were only to be permanently available to the Benetton team as so-called works engines, while customer teams were to be supplied exclusively with the old DFZ and DFR engines. Although teams like Lotus and Tyrrell were already trying to get customer HBs in the spring of 1989, Ford and Cosworth stuck to this dichotomy until the end of 1990, under pressure from Benetton. However, Ford in particular was not satisfied with Benetton's results. Benetton ended the 1990 season third in the Constructors' Championship; In 1990, however, the team had repeatedly lost out to the Tyrrell Racing Organization, whose cars with old DFR engines had been faster in some qualifying sessions than the Benettons with the HB blocks. Since Benetton had also only won two races in 1990, Cosworth and Ford became more willing in the fall of 1990 to make the HB engine available to at least one other team in 1991. The choice fell on the Formula 1 debutant Jordan Grand Prix, from which Benetton did not expect any danger. After just one year, Jordan abandoned the HB engines. For 1992, Benetton again requested an exclusive supply of HB engines. For this reason, and also because the previous customer engines of the DFR type were no longer competitive, Ford initially announced in autumn 1991 that it would completely discontinue the customer engine business at the end of the season and concentrate exclusively on Benetton. In December 1991, however, there was a reversal: Because there was still a need for some small teams, Ford and Cosworth also provided customer engines from 1992. The customer engine business was now operated with the HB blocks, however, the customer HBs were at least one or more stages of development behind the Benetton factory engines. In addition, until 1993, customer engines were generally not serviced at Cosworth itself, but at Grand Prix Engines Services (GPES), a subsidiary of Tom Walkinshaw Racing (TWR). John Judd's company Engine Developments initially supplied independent customer engines. They were cheaper than Cosworth's HB engines, but were no longer available from 1993 because Judd from 1993 on the provision of Yamaha-Engines specialized for Tyrrell.

The coexistence of Benetton's factory HBs and customer HBs existed until 1993. It was only broken up in 1993 by the McLaren customer team, which emphatically demanded that equivalent engines be supplied and was able to enforce this from the middle of the season. By 1994 only small, economically weak teams that had no access to factory engines used it for lack of alternatives. While still lighter and generally more economical than the V10s and V12s it was down on power. The HB had become the "motor of the poor."

=== Further development ===
From 1991, Cosworth worked on a successor to the HB series. Initial considerations were aimed at a twelve-cylinder engine; Corresponding press releases were distributed on the occasion of the Canadian Grand Prix in 1991 and repeated until the spring of 1992. However, after Cosworth had already carried out some detailed developments, the twelve-cylinder project was abandoned in 1992. The successor to the HB was instead an eight-cylinder engine that took over some of the details of the unrealized V-12 Cosworth. Released exclusively by Benetton in 1994 and bearing the internal designation EC, it was marketed as the Ford Zetec-R. Benetton driver Michael Schumacher won with the EC his first driver's world championship this year. The HB ran parallel to this until the end of the 1994 season with the customer teams. After that, it was obsolete because the FIA reduced the displacement limit to 3.0 litres for the 1995 season after the fatal accidents of Roland Ratzenberger and Ayrton Senna at the 1994 San Marino Grand Prix. However, Cosworth designed the Cosworth ED on the basis of the HB, which was available alongside the more powerful Zetec engines from 1995 to 1997 as a pure customer engine.

== Background ==
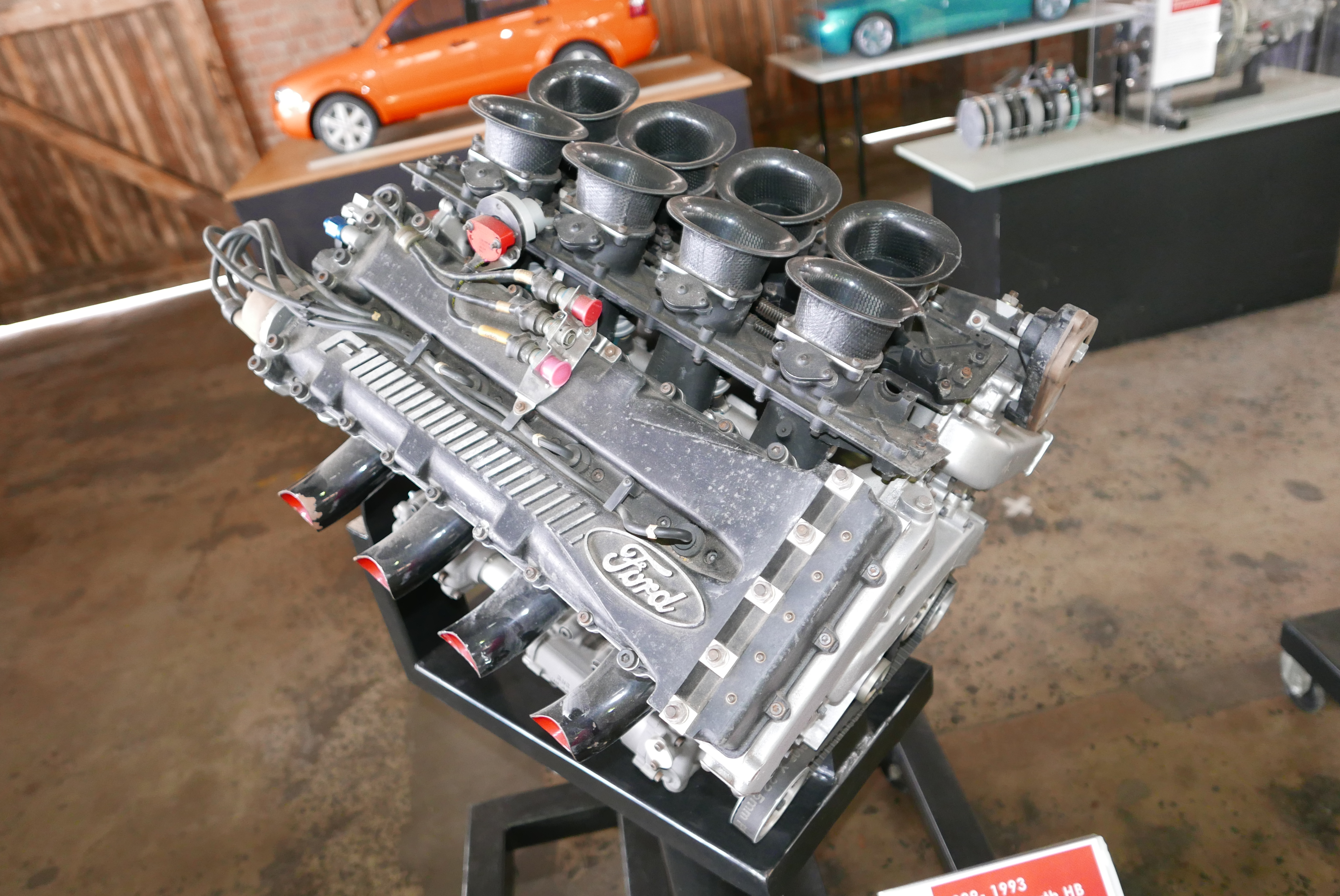
Ford Cosworth HB V8 engine.

The DFV/DFZ/DFR replacement was designed by Geoff Goddard to result in 3,498 cc (213.5 cu in) (96 mm x 60.4 mm) HB V8, which was introduced with the Benetton team midway through 1989 making its debut at the French Grand Prix, and won the Japanese Grand Prix that year (Benetton used both the original HBA1 and the development HBA4 in 1989). As Ford's de facto works team, Benetton maintained exclusivity with this model through the rest of 1989 and 1990. 1991 saw the introduction of customer units, two specifications behind their works equivalents. In 1991, these were supplied to the fledgling Jordan Grand Prix outfit, and for 1992, Lotus. 1993 saw the customer deal extended to McLaren who had lost the use of their Honda V12 engines after 1992. Using the customer HBA7 (and later a customer HBA8), McLaren won five Grands Prix with triple World Champion Ayrton Senna that year.

The HBA1 V8 was introduced in 1989. It exploited a narrower 75° vee-angle rather than the 90° used in the DFV series, and was originally rated at approximately 630 bhp (470 kW; 639 PS). By 1993, the factory HBA8 V8 engine used by Benetton was producing approximately 700 bhp (522 kW; 710 PS) at 13,000 rpm. Although the HB V8 was less powerful than the V10s and V12s used by rivals Renault, Honda, and Ferrari, its advantage was that it was lighter and gave better fuel economy.

A Jaguar-badged version of the HB was developed by Tom Walkinshaw Racing to the tune of 650 bhp at 11,500 rpm for sports car racing, fitted to the extremely successful Jaguar XJR-14 sports prototype.

== Technique ==
The HB was the first engine Cosworth designed specifically for the 3.5 litre Formula One. Geoff Goddard and John Hancock were responsible for its development. Unlike the DFR, Brian Hart was not involved in the design. The development of the HB took place in close cooperation with Benetton's technical director at the time, Rory Byrne.

=== Concept ===
While most manufacturers at this displacement saw the greatest efficiency in ten or twelve-cylinder engines, Cosworth again opted for an eight-cylinder engine. A twelve-cylinder was rejected as too big and too fuel-intensive, while a ten-cylinder was too exotic for the Cosworth designers. Ultimately, with a view to the DFV, the decisive factor was the assessment that Cosworth had the greatest experience with eight-cylinder engines.

=== Details ===
The engine block is cast from an aluminum alloy. Its dimensions are smaller than those of the DFV. While the DFV block could still be drilled from 3.0 to 3.9 litres, the HB has no reserves for an increase. A significant innovation of the HB relates to the narrower cylinder bank angle of 75 degrees compared to the DFV-DFZ-DFR series. This resulted in aerodynamic advantages, which had a particular impact on the flow towards the rear. Cosworth and Ford did not publish displacement or bore and stroke data. Based on the dimensions, it is assumed that the HB has a larger bore and a smaller stroke than the DFR. An estimate is 96 × 60.4 mm and a total displacement of 3497 cm^{3}. Each row of cylinders had two overhead camshafts, which in the first versions were driven by gears and later - from the HB VI - by chains. There are two intake and two exhaust valves for each cylinder. In this respect, the HB 1989 corresponded to the standard model. A five-valve head, as used by Ferrari, Motori Moderni (as “Subaru” in 1990 at Coloni), and Yamaha (Zakspeed), was tested by Cosworth on appropriately converted DFZ-DFR blocks but deemed unnecessary. The ignition system and injection usually came from Ford. The engines used by Minardi were an exception: They had electronics from Magneti Marelli. There was no information on the engine power. Estimates are that it was around 630 hp in the first 1989 version and had increased to 725 hp in the final 1993 version (HB VIII).

=== Stages of development ===
==== HB-I ====
The basic version, subsequently designated HB I, made its debut in France in July 1989. This version was used exclusively by Benetton. The power of the first HB version was estimated at 630 hp, about 40 hp more than the DFR and 40 hp less than the Honda RA 109E, the most powerful engine of the 1989 season.

==== HB-II ====
The first revision took place in the summer of 1989. It led to the HB II version, which debuted at the end of October 1989 at the Japanese Grand Prix. The HB II was also used exclusively by Benetton.

==== HB-III ====
The third version of the HB was in service with Benetton in the first half of the 1990 season. After six months it was replaced by the Series IV. Some HB-III blocks were used in 1991 and 1992 sports car racing. They then went to the Minardi team, which brought them to the start in the 1993 Formula 1 World Championship in the M193.

==== HB-IV ====
The fourth HB version was released for the British Grand Prix in July 1990. Significant innovations came into effect with it. The pistons, the cylinder heads, the valves, and the valve control were newly designed. The maximum speed increased by 1000 to almost 13000 revolutions per minute, the performance was according to Cosworth at "over 650 bhp". The HB IV was used by Benetton in 1990 and Jordan in 1991. For the Canadian Grand Prix, the HB-IV engine received a "minor update", which Jordan's chief engineer, Gary Anderson, considered "purely cosmetic"

==== HB-V ====
The fifth version of the HB made its debut at Benetton for the third race of the 1991 season in San Marino. The camshafts were now driven by chains. The engine reached speeds of more than 13000 revolutions per minute and produced around 670 hp in the second half of the season. In 1992 the HB-V blocks appeared as customer engines at Fondmetal and Lotus; In 1993 they went to the McLaren team in the first half of the year, which they continued to develop independently together with TAG until the summer of 1993. The developments primarily concerned the engine electronics and brought McLaren's HB V at least to the performance level of the HB VI.

==== HB-VI ====
The HB VI was developed at the end of 1991, but only appeared at the beginning of the 1992 season. A new feature here was semi-pneumatic valve control, in which the valves were reset using air pressure. This eliminated the need for valve springs. Renault already had a comparable system in operation on its ten-cylinder engine. The engines with semi-pneumatic valve control required more maintenance and were, therefore, more expensive than the early versions with conventional valve springs. In 1992 they were not used by customer teams. They appeared on Lotus in 1993, and Simtek the following year.

==== HB-VII ====
The seventh version of the HB appeared for the fifth race of the season in 1992 in San Marino. At 710 hp, it was significantly more powerful than the HB VI, but had less low-end torque in comparison.

==== HB-VIII ====
The eighth and final version of the HB engine was first used in practice for the 1993 German Grand Prix. This version had, among other things, newly designed cylinder heads. For them, Cosworth implemented detailed solutions that had been developed for the V12 naturally aspirated engine, which was ultimately not realized. The HB VIII had a maximum output of 725 hp and a maximum speed of 13,700 rpm. The performance deficit on the Renault engines of the Williams team was 70 to 100 hp, depending on the source.

HB-VII and HB-VIII engines went first to Benetton in 1993 and then to McLaren in the second half of the season; In 1994 they were used by all customer teams with the exception of Simtek.

== The Cosworth HB at Benetton ==
The HB first appeared in the 1989 French Grand Prix in the Benetton B189. Ford originally wanted to debut the engine at the beginning of the season, but Benetton was behind schedule with the development of the new car, and last year's B188B model, used as a stopgap, could not accommodate the HB engine for technical reasons. The situation was also not helped by Benetton's lead driver Alessandro Nannini crashing the team's only completed B189 in testing at Imola. Before the first race, Benetton and Cosworth carried out long test drives in the new car, during which crankshaft defects increased. These problems were not resolved until June 1989. At the debut in France, only Nannini received the new car and engine; his teammate Emanuele Pirro had to compete here and in the subsequent race in Great Britain still with the B188B and the DFR engine. In France, Nannini was the second-fastest driver and was second in the race to Alain Prost in the McLaren-Honda before retiring with suspension failure. Nannini finished the following race in Great Britain in third place. In the second half of the season, both Benetton drivers retired five times due to chassis problems or driving errors. At the end of the season, however, Nannini achieved the first win in the series at the rainy Japanese Grand Prix with the HB II, which was used for the first time, after Ayrton Senna's disqualification, which was followed by second place in Australia.

In 1990 Benetton paired three-time world champion Nelson Piquet with Alessandro Nannini, who was replaced by Roberto Moreno for the final two races of the season after the Italian suffered a career ending injury in a helicopter accident (Nannini's right forearm was severed in the accident and was re-attached with microsurgery, though his F1 driving career was over). Initially, HB III engines were used, which were replaced by the HB IV version in the summer. At the beginning of the season, Benetton had difficulties asserting itself against the smaller teams with the old DFR customer engine. At the US Grand Prix, Pierluigi Martini (Minardi), Andrea de Cesaris (BMS Scuderia Italia) and Jean Alesi (Tyrrell) qualified ahead of Piquet in the fastest Benetton. The situation was similar in Brazil, and also in San Marino and Monaco, a DFR car with Jean Alesis Tyrrell was the top-placed Cosworth car. However, the good qualifying results of the smaller teams were at least partly due to the exceptional performance of Pirelli's qualifying tyres, which were superior to the Goodyear tires used by Benetton. On the other hand, Alesi finished second twice at the start of the season with the revolutionary Tyrrell 019, putting DFR customer Tyrrell ahead of Benetton in the constructors' championship up until the Canadian Grand Prix. Ultimately, however, Benetton established itself. With two wins Piquet's in Japan and Australia - where Benetton even achieved a double victory - as well as three second and three third places and several other places in the points, the team scored 71 world championship points and finished third in the constructors' championship at the end of the year behind McLaren and Ferrari.

In 1991, Benetton predominantly drove the HB V, while the HB IV used last year was used by Jordan Grand Prix. Benetton fell far short of last year's results. There was only one win (Piquet in Canada) and two third places (Piquet in USA and Belgium). His teammate Moreno finished fourth twice and fifth once. He was replaced at the Italian Grand Prix by Michael Schumacher, who finished fifth and two sixth places. With 38.5 points, Benetton fell back to fourth place in the constructors' championship behind McLaren, Williams, and Ferrari. Jordan was fifth with 13 points.

In 1992, Benetton re-established itself as the third strongest force. From the start of the season, Cosworth supplied the HB VI with semi-pneumatic valve control, and the further developed HB VII was available from spring. In the course of 1992, Benetton switched between the HB VI and the HB VII, with the characteristics of the respective racetrack ultimately determining the choice. With these engines, the Benetton drivers Michael Schumacher and Martin Brundle were not able to catch up with the Williams-Renault, but they could still catch up with the McLaren-Honda and at the same time keep the Ferrari clearly behind them. Brundle was second once and third four times. Schumacher won his first Formula 1 World Championship race in Belgium and also finished second three times and third four times. At least one Benetton driver was on the podium in 11 of 16 races. At the end of the year, Benetton had scored 91 points, the best result in the team's history up to that point. As a result, Benetton again took third place in the constructors' championship. The gap to McLaren, the runner-up in the constructors' championship, who competed with twelve-cylinder Honda engines, was just eight points. In the driving classification, Schumacher was third ahead of the McLaren driver Senna. Vice-champion Riccardo Patrese (Williams) only had three points more.

1993 was the last year that Benetton used the HB engine. The team had exclusive use of the HB VII until early summer 1993, after which McLaren received the same engines as Benetton. From the British Grand Prix, both teams received the final stage of expansion HB VIII. In that year, Benetton consolidated its position as the third force in the constructors' championship, but had to admit defeat to the customer team McLaren, which was initially only able to use outdated HB-V engines, but this was compensated with a sophisticated electronics package from TAG Electronics that included a full active suspension system. At the end of the year, however, McLaren was ahead of Benetton in the overall standings. Schumacher has been out more often this season than in previous years. Although each of Schumacher's finishes ended with a place on the podium, there was only one victory in 1993, too. By comparison, Ayrton Senna in the McLaren won five races, the first three with the customer engine.

== The Cosworth HB at the customer teams ==
In December 1990, Cosworth decided to continue the customer engine program with the HB, which was initially supposed to come to an end with the discontinuation of the DFR. From 1991 to 1994, eight teams started with HB customer engines. Only McLaren achieved wins and podium finishes.

=== 1991: Jordan ===
At the beginning of the 1991 season, Eddie Jordan's Irish-licensed racing team Jordan Grand Prix made its Formula 1 debut. The team, which had competed in the European Formula 3000 Championship since 1988 and had won the championship in 1989 with Jean Alesi, was considered to be well organised. The well-connected businessman managed to get access to HB engines through direct contacts with Cosworth in the fall of 1990. Some sources assume that Jordan's designer Gary Anderson arranged the contact. The newcomer Jordan was the first HB customer team. Motor costs came to £4.5m, making up the majority of the £7m budget. However, Jordan's engines were not equivalent to those of Benetton. While Benetton used the HB-V versions, Jordan ran the HB-IV engines dating back to the previous year in the 191 throughout the season.

Jordan's Formula 1 start was one of the most successful debuts in recent years. Overall, the team scored 13 points and finished fifth in the constructors' championship, just one place behind Benetton; however, Benetton had scored three times as many points. Andrea de Cesaris drove for Jordan throughout. Bertrand Gachot started in the second car, and was initially replaced by debutant Michael Schumacher after being sentenced to prison in late summer. Schumacher switched to Benetton after one race, replacing Roberto Moreno, who in turn took over the vacant Jordan cockpit for two races before being replaced by Alessandro Zanardi. The best Jordan rider was de Cesaris, who finished fourth in Canada and Mexico and also finished fifth once and sixth once. Of the other drivers, however, only Gachot was able to score points. In 1992, Jordan switched to free Yamaha 12-cylinder engines, which gave the team just one point all season.

=== 1992: Fondmetal ===
The Italian racing team Fondmetal, which emerged from the Osella Squadra Corse in 1991, competed in 1991 as one of the last teams with Cosworth's DFR engines. However, the initial plans to switch to Judd ten-cylinder engines for 1992 failed due to technical difficulties. Cosworth then took on Fondmetal for 1992 as another customer team alongside Lotus. The team, like Lotus, received HB-V engines that were at the 1991 development level. Fondmetal was the weakest customer team this year: Gabriele Tarquini qualified for each of the 13 races for which his team was registered, but he reached the finish only once. Andrea Chiesa, in the second car, failed to qualify in seven out of ten world championship races, he retired three times. Chiesa was responsible for numerous engine failures because he repeatedly used the engine as a brake and over-revved the HB. His successor Eric van de Poele finished once in three attempts. In the late summer of 1992, Fondmetal stopped racing.

=== 1992-1993: Lotus ===
The British team Lotus - at that time the second oldest team in Formula 1 - was, in 1991, in a severe economic crisis and went through a restructuring. In 1991, for financial reasons, it was the last team to use outdated Judd eight-cylinder engines (type EV), which were weaker than the DFR engines and, like the DFR, were no longer available in 1992. Initially, Lotus had considered a switch to Judd's ten-cylinder engine (Judd GV), but then decided at short notice for Cosworth customer engines, the costs of which were supported by the sponsors Castrol and Hitachi. In 1992, Lotus received HB V generation engines, which Fondmetal also used. The newly introduced Lotus 107 was tailored to this engine. It was essentially constructed by the competing team March Engineering, but could not be realized there for financial reasons. In 1992, Lotus started consistently with Mika Häkkinen and Johnny Herbert. Although they did not achieve any podium finishes, they did achieve two fourth, one fifth, and five sixth places. With a total of 13 points, Lotus finished fifth in the 1992 Constructors' Championship, ahead of Tyrrell-Ilmor and Footwork-Honda.

In 1993, Lotus used the previous year's chassis, which had been further developed into the 107B, which was equipped with reactive wheel suspension and, from the summer of 1993, also with anti-slip control. Both systems were prone to failure. According to some sources, the HB VI was now used; another source assumes that Lotus drove with HB-V engines this year as well. In any case, the maintenance was carried out by Grand Prix Engines Services (Tom Walkinshaw Racing). Regular drivers were Johnny Herbert and Alessandro Zanardi. Herbert finished fourth three times and fifth once and scored 11 championship points. Zanardi finished sixth in the second race of the year in Brazil. During practice for the Belgian Grand Prix, he suffered a serious accident, after which he was out for the rest of the season. In this race, Herbert once again took fifth place. Here he scored the last world championship points for Team Lotus. In the remaining races, Portuguese debutant Pedro Lamy drove the second Lotus. At the end of the year, Lotus was sixth in the Constructors' Championship with 12 points. Over the course of the year, Lotus fell into arrears with the lease payments for the engines; at the end of 1994, when the team went bankrupt, they were still among the open claims.

=== 1993: McLaren ===
McLaren had been associated with car manufacturer Honda since 1988. The pairing was extraordinarily successful: from 1988 to 1991 all drivers' world championships went to McLaren Honda drivers. Nevertheless, Honda withdrew from Formula 1 at the end of the 1992 season; only through Honda's subsidiary, Mugen, were further older customer engines looked after. McLaren's team boss Ron Dennis tried, among other things, to obtain Renault engines for 1993, but failed due to the veto of Renault partner Elf Aquitaine (unlike Williams who immediately dropped their Mobil sponsorship in favour of Elf when they took on the Renault engines in 1989, McLaren refused to drop their long time Shell sponsorship). McLaren's engine situation was completely open until December 1992. In October 1992, when asked by a journalist about the future engine partner, Ron Dennis replied: "It would be inappropriate to share this information with you". McLaren's regular driver Ayrton Senna also received no information until the end of 1992. Ultimately, due to a lack of alternatives for the 1993 season, McLaren had to, for the first time since 1983, use Cosworth customer engines. Since Benetton refused to supply a competitor with current HB-VII engines, McLaren only had HB-V engines available at the beginning of the season, which was at the 1991 level and was about 40 hp weaker than the HB VII. Admittedly, McLaren developed the electronics of the HB engines independently together with their technology partner TAG, so that the difference in performance was "blurred". Unlike the rest of the customer engines, the McLaren HBs were not serviced by Grand Prix Engines Services, owned by Tom Walkinshaw (who was also technical director at Benetton at the time). In order to rule out possible conflicts of interest, Cosworth took over the maintenance of the McLaren engines itself. From the British Grand Prix, McLaren also received the HB-VII engines. The HB VIII finally made its debut at the 1993 German Grand Prix. McLaren had access to it in Friday practice, Benetton only in Saturday practice.

Ayrton Senna's effort concealed the power deficits of his engine. With the old HB V, he won three races in the first half of the season. The European Grand Prix at Donington Park, which is one of the "ten best races in Formula 1", is considered historic, mainly because of Senna's outstanding overtaking maneuver on the first lap. After starting from fourth place and falling back to fifth place in the initial phase, Senna overtook Damon Hill, Alain Prost (both Williams), Michael Schumacher (Benetton), and Karl Wendlinger (Sauber) in front of him on the first lap on a wet track and took the lead. In addition, Senna lapped the entire field except for second-placed Hill and set the fastest lap of the race, including a pit stop. Senna achieved further victories with the HB V in Brazil and Monaco. With the HB VIII, he won in Japan and Australia. In Australia, Senna also achieved the first (and ultimately only) pole position for an HB engine; it was the first pole position for a Cosworth engine since the 1983 Brazilian Grand Prix (achieved by Keke Rosberg in a Williams). Senna and McLaren finished second in the Drivers' and Constructors' Championships respectively.

=== 1993 and 1994: Minardi ===
After the Italian team Minardi competed with Ferrari engines in 1991 and Lamborghini engines in 1992, the 1993 season started with HB customer engines. While the other HB customers received the engines from Cosworth and only had the maintenance carried out by Grand Prix Engines Services (Tom Walkinshaw Racing), in the case of Minardi's the engines came directly from GPES or TWR. These were the HB-III blocks that Walkinshaw had raced in the 1991 Jaguar XJR-14 Group C sportscar in the 1991 World Sportscar Championship. They were at the 1990 level of development when Minardi took them over. The lease price that year was $2.4 million. In the first races of the year, Minardi was surprisingly successful with the technically very simple M193 designed by Gustav Brunner; good results were mostly achieved in difficult weather conditions. At the rainy season opener on the Kyalami Grand Prix Circuit, Christian Fittipaldi finished fourth and secured three valuable championship points for the team. His teammate Fabrizio Barbazza also finished sixth in the European Grand Prix and in the following race at Imola. In Monaco finally Fittipaldi finished fifth again. Minardi had thus scored seven championship points after the sixth race and was ahead of Scuderia Ferrari in the interim classification of the constructors' championship. After that, however, no more points were added. In total, Minardi scored seven championship points in 1993 and finished eighth in the constructors' championship. It was able to outperform established teams like Arrows/Footwork (four points, ninth place) or Tyrrell (no point, 13th place) as well as the better-financed Jordan team (three points, eleventh place).

For the 1994 season, Minardi repositioned itself. Half of the company's shares were acquired by a consortium led by Giuseppe "Beppe" Lucchini, whose Formula 1 team BMS Scuderia Italia had stopped operating at the end of 1993. Minardi's opportunities improved significantly. That also affected the engine. Although Minardi's agreement with TWR for the supply of HB-III engines also extended to 1994, with the financial support of Lucchini, Minardi managed to conclude a contract directly with Cosworth, so that on the one hand the detour via TWR and on the other hand the team became superfluous Gained access to HB-VII and HB-VIII engines; the latter was from the German Grand Prix in action. The chassis was initially the M193 known from the previous year, which was gradually developed into the M194 in the first half of the season. Pilots were the experienced Italians Michele Alboreto, who contested his last Formula 1 season here, and Pierluigi Martini. Regardless of the significantly more powerful engine compared to the HB III, Minardi in 1994 was unable to match the performance of the previous year. Both drivers finished in the points once each with the old car – Martini was fifth in Spain and Alboreto sixth in Monaco –; with the M194, on the other hand, only two championship points could be brought in, as Martini in France finished fifth. In contrast, the drivers did not score any more points in the second half of the season. Minardi ended the season in 10th place in the constructors' championship with five points. That put the team ahead of Larrousse and Simtek.

For the 1995 season, Minardi's two-year relationship with TWR brought a setback. Minardi had contracted for 1995 ten-cylinder engines from Mugen. However, Walkinshaw wanted to divert these engines to the Équipe Ligier, which he controlled, which in turn had sold the Renault engines used there to Benetton. In late autumn 1994, Walkinshaw persuaded Minardi to abandon the Mugen engines with the threat of enforcement measures for unpaid bills from the 1993 season. Minardi then had to contest the 1995 season with Cosworth customer engines of the ED type.

=== 1994: Footwork ===
The Arrows team, which has been running under the name Footwork since 1991, had used ten-cylinder Mugen engines in 1992 and 1993, which could be traced back to Honda designs. For the 1994 season, the Mugen engines went exclusively to Team Lotus, which had previously used Cosworth HB eight-cylinder engines. Footwork then resorted to the HB engines as a makeshift solution for 1994. In the construction by Alan Jenkins Footwork FA15 engines of the HB VII series were initially used, which were replaced by HB VIII versions in the summer. Drivers were Christian Fittipaldi and Gianni Morbidelli. Both qualified repeatedly for places in the first third of the starting field, but only finished in the points four times. Fittipaldi finished fourth in the Pacific Grand Prix and Germany, Morbidelli finished fifth in Germany and sixth in Belgium. Morbidelli missed twelve times. At the end of the year, Footwork sat marginally ninth in the Constructors' Championship with nine points. For the 1995 season, Footwork switched engines to Hart's newly designed eight-cylinder engines.

=== 1994: Larrousse ===
The French Larrousse team used twelve-cylinder Lamborghini engines from 1989 to 1993 (the only exception was 1991). After Lamborghini's intensive efforts to become McLaren's engine partner for 1994 surprisingly failed - Mclaren had opted for Peugeot engines - the Italian company, which at the time belonged to the US Chrysler group, discontinued the engine program completely at the end of 1993. Team boss Gérard Larrousse then tried to get Peugeot engines as a junior partner alongside McLaren; However, McLaren's team boss Ron Dennis insisted on an exclusive engine contract. Larrousse, therefore, had to switch to Cosworth customer engines for the 1994 season. As with Minardi, HB-VII engines were initially used, and then HB-VIII engines from the German Grand Prix onwards. The Larrousse LH94 was an 8-cylinder modified version of last year's LH93, which in turn was based on a 1992 Robin Herd design. Larrousse took over the gearbox and rear axle from the 1993 Benetton B193 for the LH94.

The financially troubled team started the season with drivers Érik Comas and Olivier Beretta. Comas finished sixth in both the Pacific Grand Prix and the German Grand Prix; those were the only points Larrousse scored that year. From the Belgian Grand Prix onwards, a number of pay drivers were used whose payments kept the team alive. Philippe Alliot, Yannick Dalmas, Hideki Noda and Jean-Denis Deletrazbroke off at Larrousse. With them, Larrousse fell off sharply. Only Dalmas finished the car again. At the end of the season, Larrousse was 11th in the Constructors' Championship behind Footwork and Minardi. The team was insolvent at the end of the year. There was another entry for 1995 with Cosworth ED engines, but ultimately it didn't appear.

=== 1994: Simtek ===
Nick Wirth's Team Simtek debuted in Formula 1 in 1994. Simtek was primarily a design office that had already developed several Formula 1 racing cars as commissioned work since 1991, of which only the 1992 version as the Andrea Moda S921 actually appeared in racing. A revised model was to be used by Team Bravo España in 1993. After the Spanish project failed just before the start of the season, Nick Wirth decided to use his own factory team in 1994. Simtek was next to the other debutants Pacific Racing this year the weakest funded team. While Simtek's previous designs for Andrea Moda and Bravo were tailored for the Judd GV ten-cylinder engine, the factory team no longer had that option in 1994, as Judd had discontinued its customer program in 1993 to concentrate exclusively on the Yamaha engines for Tyrrell. That's why the Simtek works team's car, which was further developed into the S941, started in 1994 with a customer HB. HB VI is usually mentioned in the registration lists; On the other hand, some sources assume that Simtek actually used the older but cheaper HB-IV versions without valve pneumatics for financial reasons. The team experienced a disastrous first season: the Simtek driver had an accident in the third race of the year in Imola Roland Ratzenberger died, four weeks later his successor Andrea Montermini suffered injuries in an accident in Spain. The team continued the season with inexperienced backup pilots Jean-Marc Gounon, Domenico Schiattarella, and Taki Inoue. Gounon achieved Simtek's best result this year with ninth place in France. But the fastest driver was David Brabham in the second Simtek. He qualified for every race and in the second half of the season was repeatedly able to assert himself against the drivers of the established Larrousse team, who drove with younger and more powerful HB engines. At the end of the season, Simtek finished second to bottom in the Constructors' Championship, ahead of Pacific.

== The Cosworth HB in sports car racing ==
Unlike its predecessor DFZ/DFR, the Cosworth HB was hardly ever used outside of Formula 1. After the FIA had allowed 3.5-litre naturally aspirated engines for the 1991 season of the sports car world championship as part of extensive rule changes, aggregates from the Formula 1 can be adopted with a few changes. Accordingly, Tom Walkinshaw Racing then installed an HB-III engine in its Group C Jaguar XJR-14 sports car. The cars won the 1991 430 km Monza race, the Silverstone, and the 430 km Nürburgring race. At the 1991 Le Mans 24 HoursHowever, Walkinshaw decided not to use the XJR-14 because the engine was not believed to be capable of 24-hour continuous operation without problems. In 1992 XJR-14s were then driven in the IMSA GTP series. Davy Jones won the championship rounds at Road Atlanta and Mid-Ohio with this Jaguar model.

== Applications ==
=== Formula 1 cars ===
- Benetton B189
- Benetton B190
- Benetton B191
- Benetton B192
- Benetton B193
- McLaren MP4/8
- Lotus 102D
- Lotus 107
- Fondmetal GR01
- Fondmetal GR02
- Jordan 191

=== Sports prototype cars ===
- Jaguar XJR-14

=== Other ===
- Ford Supervan 3

== Formula One Championship results ==
(key) (Races in bold indicate pole position) (Races in italics indicate fastest lap)

Year	Entrant	Chassis	Engine	Tyre	Drivers	1	2	3	4	5	6	7	8	9	10	11	12	13	14	15	16	Points	WCC
1989	Benetton Formula Ltd	Benetton B189	Ford Cosworth HBA1 / HBA4 3.5 V8	G		BRA	SMR	MON	MEX	USA	CAN	FRA	GBR	GER	HUN	BEL	ITA	POR	ESP	JPN	AUS	**39**	**4th**
1989	Benetton Formula Ltd	Benetton B189	Ford Cosworth HBA1 / HBA4 3.5 V8	G	Alessandro Nannini							Ret	3	Ret	Ret	5	Ret	4	Ret	1	2	**39**	**4th**
1989	Benetton Formula Ltd	Benetton B189	Ford Cosworth HBA1 / HBA4 3.5 V8	G	Emanuele Pirro									Ret	8	10	Ret	Ret	Ret	Ret	5	**39**	**4th**
1990	Benetton Formula Ltd	Benetton B189B; Benetton B190	Ford Cosworth HBA4 3.5 V8	G		USA	BRA	SMR	MON	CAN	MEX	FRA	GBR	GER	HUN	BEL	ITA	POR	ESP	JPN	AUS	**71**	**3rd**
1990	Benetton Formula Ltd	Benetton B189B; Benetton B190	Ford Cosworth HBA4 3.5 V8	G	Alessandro Nannini	11	10	3	Ret	Ret	4	16	Ret	2	Ret	4	8	6	3			**71**	**3rd**
1990	Benetton Formula Ltd	Benetton B189B; Benetton B190	Ford Cosworth HBA4 3.5 V8	G	Roberto Moreno															2	7	**71**	**3rd**
1990	Benetton Formula Ltd	Benetton B189B; Benetton B190	Ford Cosworth HBA4 3.5 V8	G	Nelson Piquet	4	6	5	DSQ	2	6	4	5	Ret	3	5	7	5	Ret	1	1	**71**	**3rd**
1991	Camel Benetton Ford	Benetton B190B; Benetton B191	Ford Cosworth HBA4 3.5 V8; Ford Cosworth HBA5 3.5 V8	P		USA	BRA	SMR	MON	CAN	MEX	FRA	GBR	GER	HUN	BEL	ITA	POR	ESP	JPN	AUS	**38.5***	**4th**
1991	Camel Benetton Ford	Benetton B190B; Benetton B191	Ford Cosworth HBA4 3.5 V8; Ford Cosworth HBA5 3.5 V8	P	Roberto Moreno	Ret	7	13	4	Ret	5	Ret	Ret	8	8	4						**38.5***	**4th**
1991	Camel Benetton Ford	Benetton B190B; Benetton B191	Ford Cosworth HBA4 3.5 V8; Ford Cosworth HBA5 3.5 V8	P	Michael Schumacher												5	6	6	Ret	Ret	**38.5***	**4th**
1991	Camel Benetton Ford	Benetton B190B; Benetton B191	Ford Cosworth HBA4 3.5 V8; Ford Cosworth HBA5 3.5 V8	P	Nelson Piquet	3	5	Ret	Ret	1	Ret	8	5	Ret	Ret	3	6	5	11	7	4	**38.5***	**4th**
1991	Team 7UP Jordan	Jordan 191	Ford Cosworth HBA4 3.5 V8	G	Bertrand Gachot	10	13	Ret	8	5	Ret	Ret	6	6	9							**13**	**5th**
1991	Team 7UP Jordan	Jordan 191	Ford Cosworth HBA4 3.5 V8	G	Michael Schumacher											Ret						**13**	**5th**
1991	Team 7UP Jordan	Jordan 191	Ford Cosworth HBA4 3.5 V8	G	Roberto Moreno												Ret	10				**13**	**5th**
1991	Team 7UP Jordan	Jordan 191	Ford Cosworth HBA4 3.5 V8	G	Alessandro Zanardi														9	Ret	9	**13**	**5th**
1991	Team 7UP Jordan	Jordan 191	Ford Cosworth HBA4 3.5 V8	G	Andrea de Cesaris	DNPQ	Ret	Ret	Ret	4	4	6	Ret	5	7	13	7	8	Ret	Ret	8	**13**	**5th**
1992	Camel Benetton Ford	Benetton B191B; Benetton B192	Ford Cosworth HBA5 3.5 V8; Ford Cosworth HBA7 3.5 V8	G		RSA	MEX	BRA	ESP	SMR	MON	CAN	FRA	GBR	GER	HUN	BEL	ITA	POR	JPN	AUS	**91**	**3rd**
1992	Camel Benetton Ford	Benetton B191B; Benetton B192	Ford Cosworth HBA5 3.5 V8; Ford Cosworth HBA7 3.5 V8	G	Michael Schumacher	4	3	3	2	Ret	4	2	Ret	4	3	Ret	1	3	7	Ret	2	**91**	**3rd**
1992	Camel Benetton Ford	Benetton B191B; Benetton B192	Ford Cosworth HBA5 3.5 V8; Ford Cosworth HBA7 3.5 V8	G	Martin Brundle	Ret	Ret	Ret	Ret	4	5	Ret	3	3	4	5	4	2	4	3	3	**91**	**3rd**
1992	Team Lotus; Team Castrol Lotus	Lotus 102D; Lotus 107	Ford Cosworth HBA5 3.5 V8	G	Mika Häkkinen	9	6	10	Ret	DNQ	Ret	Ret	4	6	Ret	4	6	Ret	5	Ret	7	**13**	**5th**
1992	Team Lotus; Team Castrol Lotus	Lotus 102D; Lotus 107	Ford Cosworth HBA5 3.5 V8	G	Johnny Herbert	6	7	Ret	Ret	Ret	Ret	Ret	6	Ret	Ret	Ret	13	Ret	Ret	Ret	13	**13**	**5th**
1992	Fondmetal F1 SpA	Fondmetal GR01; Fondmetal GR02	Ford HB; V8	G	Andrea Chiesa	DNQ	Ret	DNQ	Ret	DNQ	DNQ	DNQ	Ret	DNQ	DNQ							**0**	-
1992	Fondmetal F1 SpA	Fondmetal GR01; Fondmetal GR02	Ford HB; V8	G	Eric van de Poele											Ret	10	Ret				**0**	-
1992	Fondmetal F1 SpA	Fondmetal GR01; Fondmetal GR02	Ford HB; V8	G	Gabriele Tarquini	Ret	Ret	Ret	Ret	Ret	Ret	Ret	Ret	14	Ret	Ret	Ret	Ret				**0**	-
1993	Marlboro McLaren	McLaren MP4/8	Ford Cosworth HBE7 3.5 V8; Ford Cosworth HBA8 3.5 V8	G		RSA	BRA	EUR	SMR	ESP	MON	CAN	FRA	GBR	GER	HUN	BEL	ITA	POR	JPN	AUS	**84**	**2nd**
1993	Marlboro McLaren	McLaren MP4/8	Ford Cosworth HBE7 3.5 V8; Ford Cosworth HBA8 3.5 V8	G	Michael Andretti	Ret	Ret	Ret	Ret	5	8	14	6	Ret	Ret	Ret	8	3				**84**	**2nd**
1993	Marlboro McLaren	McLaren MP4/8	Ford Cosworth HBE7 3.5 V8; Ford Cosworth HBA8 3.5 V8	G	Mika Häkkinen														Ret	3	Ret	**84**	**2nd**
1993	Marlboro McLaren	McLaren MP4/8	Ford Cosworth HBE7 3.5 V8; Ford Cosworth HBA8 3.5 V8	G	Ayrton Senna	2	1	1	Ret	2	1	18	4	5	4	Ret	4	Ret	Ret	1	**1**	**84**	**2nd**
1993	Camel Benetton Ford	Benetton B193; Benetton B193B	Ford Cosworth HBE7 3.5 V8; Ford Cosworth HBA8 3.5 V8	G	Michael Schumacher	Ret	3	Ret	3	3	Ret	2	3	2	2	Ret	2	Ret	1	Ret	Ret	**72**	**3rd**
1993	Camel Benetton Ford	Benetton B193; Benetton B193B	Ford Cosworth HBE7 3.5 V8; Ford Cosworth HBA8 3.5 V8	G	Riccardo Patrese	Ret	Ret	5	Ret	4	Ret	Ret	10	3	5	2	6	5	16	Ret	8	**72**	**3rd**
1993	Team Castrol Lotus	Lotus 107B	Ford Cosworth HBD6 3.5 V8	G	Johnny Herbert	Ret	4	4	8	Ret	Ret	10	Ret	4	10	Ret	5	Ret	Ret	11	Ret	**12**	**6th**
1993	Team Castrol Lotus	Lotus 107B	Ford Cosworth HBD6 3.5 V8	G	Alessandro Zanardi	Ret	6	8	Ret	14	7	11	Ret	Ret	Ret	Ret	DNQ					**12**	**6th**
1993	Team Castrol Lotus	Lotus 107B	Ford Cosworth HBD6 3.5 V8	G	Pedro Lamy													11	Ret	13	Ret	**12**	**6th**
1993	Minardi Team	Minardi M193	Ford Cosworth HBD6 3.5 V8	G	Christian Fittipaldi	4	Ret	7	Ret	8	5	9	8	12	11	Ret	Ret	8	9			**7**	**8th**
1993	Minardi Team	Minardi M193	Ford Cosworth HBD6 3.5 V8	G	Jean-Marc Gounon															Ret	Ret	**7**	**8th**
1993	Minardi Team	Minardi M193	Ford Cosworth HBD6 3.5 V8	G	Fabrizio Barbazza	Ret	Ret	6	6	Ret	11	Ret	Ret									**7**	**8th**
1993	Minardi Team	Minardi M193	Ford Cosworth HBD6 3.5 V8	G	Pierluigi Martini									Ret	14	Ret	Ret	7	8	10	Ret	**7**	**8th**
1994	Footwork Arrows	Footwork FA15	Ford Cosworth HBE7 3.5 V8; Ford Cosworth HBE8 3.5 V8	G		BRA	PAC	SMR	MON	ESP	CAN	FRA	GBR	GER	HUN	BEL	ITA	POR	EUR	JPN	AUS	**9**	**9th**
1994	Footwork Arrows	Footwork FA15	Ford Cosworth HBE7 3.5 V8; Ford Cosworth HBE8 3.5 V8	G	Christian Fittipaldi	Ret	4	13	Ret	Ret	DSQ	8	9	4	14	Ret	Ret	8	17	8	8	**9**	**9th**
1994	Footwork Arrows	Footwork FA15	Ford Cosworth HBE7 3.5 V8; Ford Cosworth HBE8 3.5 V8	G	Gianni Morbidelli	Ret	Ret	Ret	Ret	Ret	Ret	Ret	Ret	5	Ret	6	Ret	9	11	Ret	Ret	**9**	**9th**
1994	Minardi Team	Minardi M193B; Minardi M194	Ford Cosworth HBC7 3.5 V8; Ford Cosworth HBC8 3.5 V8	G	Pierluigi Martini						9	5	10	Ret	Ret	8	Ret	12	15	Ret	9	**5**	**10th**
1994	Minardi Team	Minardi M193B; Minardi M194	Ford Cosworth HBC7 3.5 V8; Ford Cosworth HBC8 3.5 V8	G	Michele Alboreto						11	Ret	Ret	Ret	7	9	Ret	13	14	Ret	Ret	**5**	**10th**
1994	Larrousse Tourtel F1	Larrousse LH94	Ford Cosworth HBF7 3.5 V8; Ford Cosworth HBF8 3.5 V8	G	Olivier Beretta	Ret	Ret	Ret	8	DNS	Ret	Ret	14	7	9							**2**	**11th**
1994	Larrousse Tourtel F1	Larrousse LH94	Ford Cosworth HBF7 3.5 V8; Ford Cosworth HBF8 3.5 V8	G	Philippe Alliot											Ret						**2**	**11th**
1994	Larrousse Tourtel F1	Larrousse LH94	Ford Cosworth HBF7 3.5 V8; Ford Cosworth HBF8 3.5 V8	G	Yannick Dalmas												Ret	14				**2**	**11th**
1994	Larrousse Tourtel F1	Larrousse LH94	Ford Cosworth HBF7 3.5 V8; Ford Cosworth HBF8 3.5 V8	G	Hideki Noda														Ret	Ret	Ret	**2**	**11th**
1994	Larrousse Tourtel F1	Larrousse LH94	Ford Cosworth HBF7 3.5 V8; Ford Cosworth HBF8 3.5 V8	G	Érik Comas	9	6	Ret	10	Ret	Ret	11	Ret	6	8	Ret	8	Ret	Ret	9		**2**	**11th**
1994	Larrousse Tourtel F1	Larrousse LH94	Ford Cosworth HBF7 3.5 V8; Ford Cosworth HBF8 3.5 V8	G	Jean-Denis Délétraz																Ret	**2**	**11th**
1994	MTV Simtek Ford	Simtek S941	Ford Cosworth HBD6 3.5 V8	G	David Brabham	12	Ret	Ret	Ret	10	14	Ret	15	Ret	11	Ret	Ret	Ret	Ret	12	Ret	**0**	-
1994	MTV Simtek Ford	Simtek S941	Ford Cosworth HBD6 3.5 V8	G	Roland Ratzenberger	DNQ	11	DNS														**0**	-
1994	MTV Simtek Ford	Simtek S941	Ford Cosworth HBD6 3.5 V8	G	Andrea Montermini					DNQ												**0**	-
1994	MTV Simtek Ford	Simtek S941	Ford Cosworth HBD6 3.5 V8	G	Jean-Marc Gounon							9	16	Ret	Ret	11	Ret	15				**0**	-
1994	MTV Simtek Ford	Simtek S941	Ford Cosworth HBD6 3.5 V8	G	Domenico Schiattarella														19		Ret	**0**	-
1994	MTV Simtek Ford	Simtek S941	Ford Cosworth HBD6 3.5 V8	G	Taki Inoue															Ret		**0**	-
