= Fondmetal GR01 =

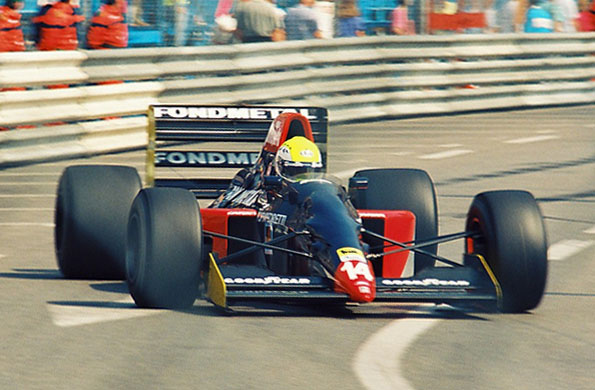
- Category: Formula One; Interserie
- Constructor: Fondmetal
- Designers: Robin Herd (Technical Director); Tim Holloway (Chief Designer); Tino Belli (Head of Aerodynamics)
- Predecessor: Fondmetal Fomet 1
- Successor: Fondmetal GR02

Technical specifications
- Chassis: carbon fibre monocoque
- Suspension (front): double wishbones, pushrods
- Suspension (rear): as front
- Engine: Ford HBA5 3,497 cc (213.4 cu in) V8 naturally-aspirated mid-engined
- Power: 660 hp @ 12,000 rpm
- Fuel: Agip
- Tyres: Goodyear

Competition history
- Notable entrants: Fondmetal F1 SpA
- Notable drivers: 14. (Switzerland) Andrea Chiesa; 15. (Italy) Gabriele Tarquini
- Debut: 1992 South African Grand Prix
Races	Wins	Poles	F/Laps
8	0	0	0

The Fondmetal GR01 was a Formula One car designed by Robin Herd, Tim Holloway and Tino Belli for the Fondmetal F1 SpA team. It was used in the first part of 1992 season.

The car was based on the Fondmetal Fomet 1 and was also equipped with a Ford engine, not the DFR fitted to the Fomet F1, but the HB, which had 100hp more power than the DFR. Fondmetal fielded two cars, for Andrea Chiesa and Gabriele Tarquini.

The GR01 recorded poor results; the model never saw the finish line.

One of GR01s was bought by Ranieri Randaccio, who redesigned the car, by enlarging the airbox and adding wheel covers over the wheels, for use in the Interserie. He raced this car from 1994 to 1997 and took second places at Most (1994, 1997) and Brands Hatch (1996).

== Complete Formula One results ==
(key) (results in bold indicate pole position, results in italics indicate fastest lap)

Year	Team	Engine	Tyres	Drivers	1	2	3	4	5	6	7	8	9	10	11	12	13	14	15	16	Points	WCC
1992	Fondmetal F1 SpA	Ford HB; V8	**G**		RSA	MEX	BRA	ESP	SMR	MON	CAN	FRA	GBR	GER	HUN	BEL	ITA	POR	JPN	AUS	**0**	**NC**
1992	Fondmetal F1 SpA	Ford HB; V8	**G**	Andrea Chiesa	DNQ	Ret	DNQ	Ret	DNQ	DNQ	DNQ		DNQ								**0**	**NC**
1992	Fondmetal F1 SpA	Ford HB; V8	**G**	Gabriele Tarquini	Ret	Ret	Ret	Ret	Ret	Ret											**0**	**NC**
