= Ford Supervan =

Promotional vehicles built for Ford UK

The Ford Transit Supervans are a series of promotional vehicles built by Ford UK. They combine the outline and appearance of the popular Ford Transit van with the chassis and performance of a sports racing car.

== Supervan ==
Ford Supervan 1

Overview
- Manufacturer: Ford Motor Company
- Production: 1971-1978
- Designer: Terry Drury Racing

Body and chassis
- Body style: Van
- Layout: Mid engine, RWD
- Doors: 2-doors
- Related: Ford Transit; Ford GT40; Cooper Monaco

Powertrain
- Engine: 302 cubic inches (4,950 cubic centimetres) Ford Windsor V8
- Power output: 435 brake horsepower (324 kilowatts; 441 metric horsepower); 540 newton-metres (400 pound force-feet)
- Transmission: 5-Speed ZF Manual

Dimensions
- Kerb weight: 3,000 pounds (1,400 kilograms)

The Supervan first appeared at the Easter 1971 meeting at Brands Hatch. Commonly rumoured to be based on a GT40 chassis, the build in fact used a modified Cooper Monaco spaceframe. Its mid-engined 400 bhp (298 kW) Ford V8 gave a standard pressed-steel Mark 1 Transit bodyshell a claimed top speed of around 150 mph (240 km/h). The vehicle had been built for Ford by Terry Drury Racing. Externally the van appeared very much like a standard Transit, in Ford's racing livery of white with low horizontal triple blue stripes. The wheel arches were flared to almost cover the wider wheels, but they were still noticeably exposed and different from those of a standard Transit. Aerodynamics of the high-mounted bodyshell were crude though, and although the van was usually demonstrated with drag starts, body lift limited its top speed on a track.

In 1978 the Transit was redesigned as the Mark II, with a much different appearance, making the original Supervan unsuitable for promoting the 'New' Transit.

The Supervan was rebuilt by Andy Browne in 2024.

== Supervan 2 ==
Ford Supervan 2

Overview
- Manufacturer: Ford Motor Company
- Production: 1983
- Designer: Tony Southgate

Body and chassis
- Body style: Van
- Layout: Mid engine, RWD
- Doors: 2-door
- Related: Ford E-Series; Ford C100

Powertrain
- Engine: 3,954.4 cubic centimetres (241.31 cu in) Cosworth DFL V8
- Power output: 590 brake horsepower (440 kilowatts; 600 metric horsepower); 540 newton-metres (400 pound force-feet)
- Transmission: 5 speed ZF Manual

Dimensions
- Wheelbase: 3,505.2 millimetres (138.00 in)
- Length: 5,761 millimetres (226.8 in)
- Width: 2,029 millimetres (79.9 in)
- Height: 2,054.9 millimetres (80.90 in)
- Kerb weight: 2,800 pounds (1,300 kilograms)

In 1984 a new Supervan 2 was constructed. The bodyshell was a fibreglass replica of the Mark 2 Transit, although slightly lowered and fitted with a front airdam, large side air inlets and a high-mounted rear spoiler. The chassis was a Ford C100 Group C car, fitted with a Cosworth DFL engine. It was built by Auto Racing Technology of Wollaston Northants. Supervan 2's debut was at Donington Park for the first British truck racing Grand Prix. During tests at Silverstone, it was timed at 174 mph (280 km/h).

Supervan 2's promotional lifespan was even shorter than the first Supervan. Just over a year later, the Mark 3 Transit was released, with a very different outline.

== Supervan 3 ==
Ford Supervan 3
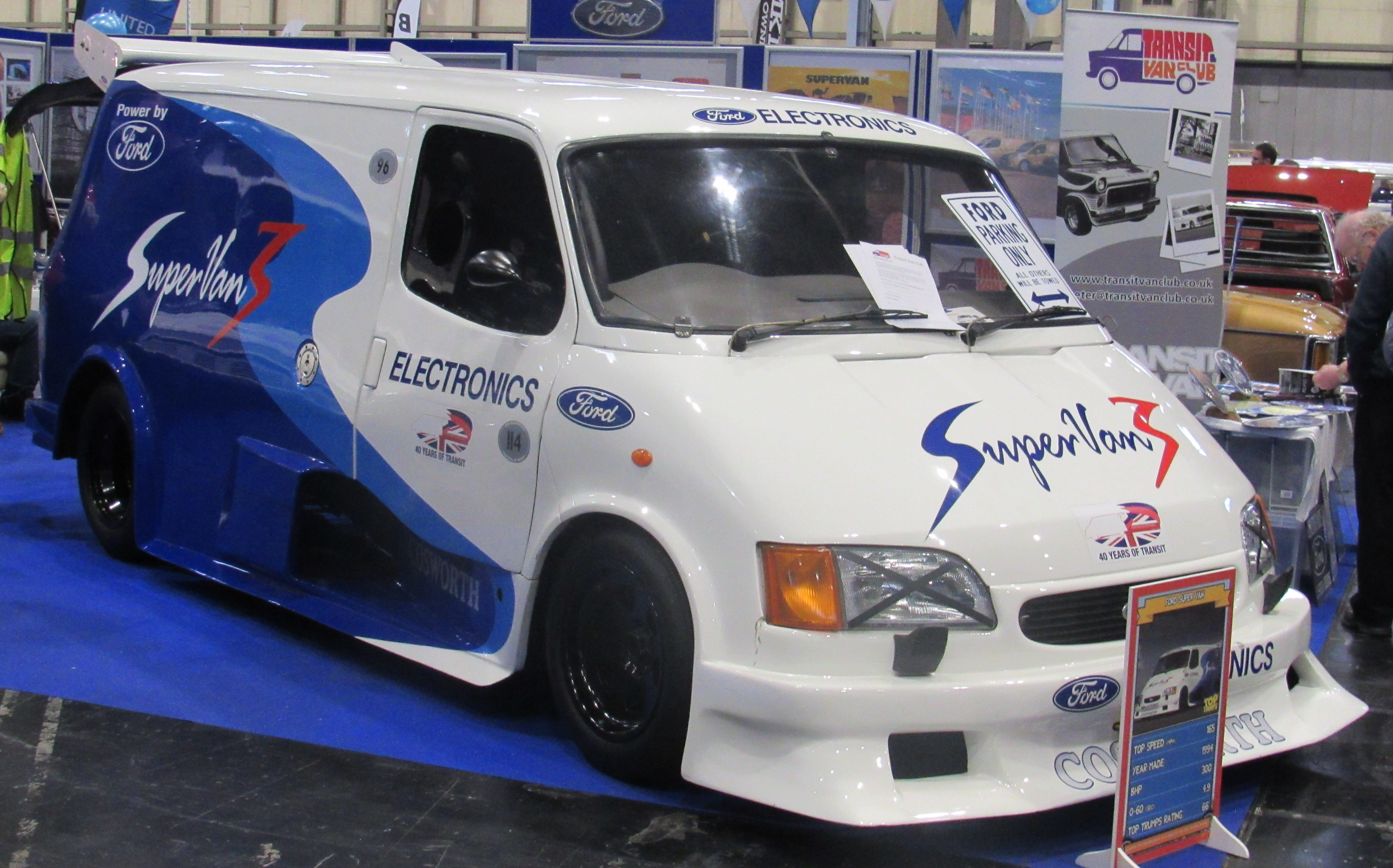

Overview
- Manufacturer: Ford Motor Company
- Production: 1994-1995
- Designer: DRL Engineering

Body and chassis
- Body style: Van
- Layout: Mid Engine, RWD
- Doors: 2-doors
- Related: Ford Transit

Powertrain
- Engine: 3,498 cubic centimetres (213.5 cubic inches) Ford-Cosworth HB V8 (Original); 2,935 cubic centimetres (179.1 cubic inches) Ford-Cosworth Pro Sports 3000 V6 (Refurbished)
- Power output: 650 brake horsepower (480 kilowatts; 660 metric horsepower); 353 newton-metres (260 pound force-feet) (Original); 295 brake horsepower (220 kilowatts; 299 metric horsepower); 384 newton-metres (283 pound force-feet) (Refurbished)
- Transmission: 5 speed ZF Manual
- Hybrid drivetrain: Mid Engine, RWD

Dimensions
- Wheelbase: 2,790 millimetres (110 in)
- Length: 4,600 millimetres (180 in)
- Width: 1,880 millimetres (74 in)
- Height: 1,670 millimetres (66 in)
- Kerb weight: 890 kilograms (1,960 pounds)

In 1994, to promote the new Mark 3 Transit Facelift, Supervan 2 was rebuilt as Supervan 3. This was the first time that Supervan had been used to promote a new model, rather than a model already nearing its end of life. A seven-eighths scale reduced replica of the new bodyshell was fitted, together with a new engine, a Cosworth HB. The work was carried out by DRL Engineering of Suffolk. This version also had the longest promotional lifespan, appearing in public until 2001. With several liveries in Ford's blue and white over the years, its final appearance was in Royal Mail red, celebrating Ford's new contract to supply their vans, taking over from a long arrangement with Leyland DAF Vans.

In 2004 a refurbishment was announced. The engine was replaced with a more practical Ford-Cosworth Pro Sports 3000 V6 engine, and the 1984 Ford Motorsport blue and white livery was restored. This work was carried out by Sporting and Historic Car Engineers of Bicester.

In 2007 it was suggested that Supervan 3's chassis might be rebuilt into a C100 and used for historic sports car racing.

== SuperVan 4 ==
Ford Supervan 4
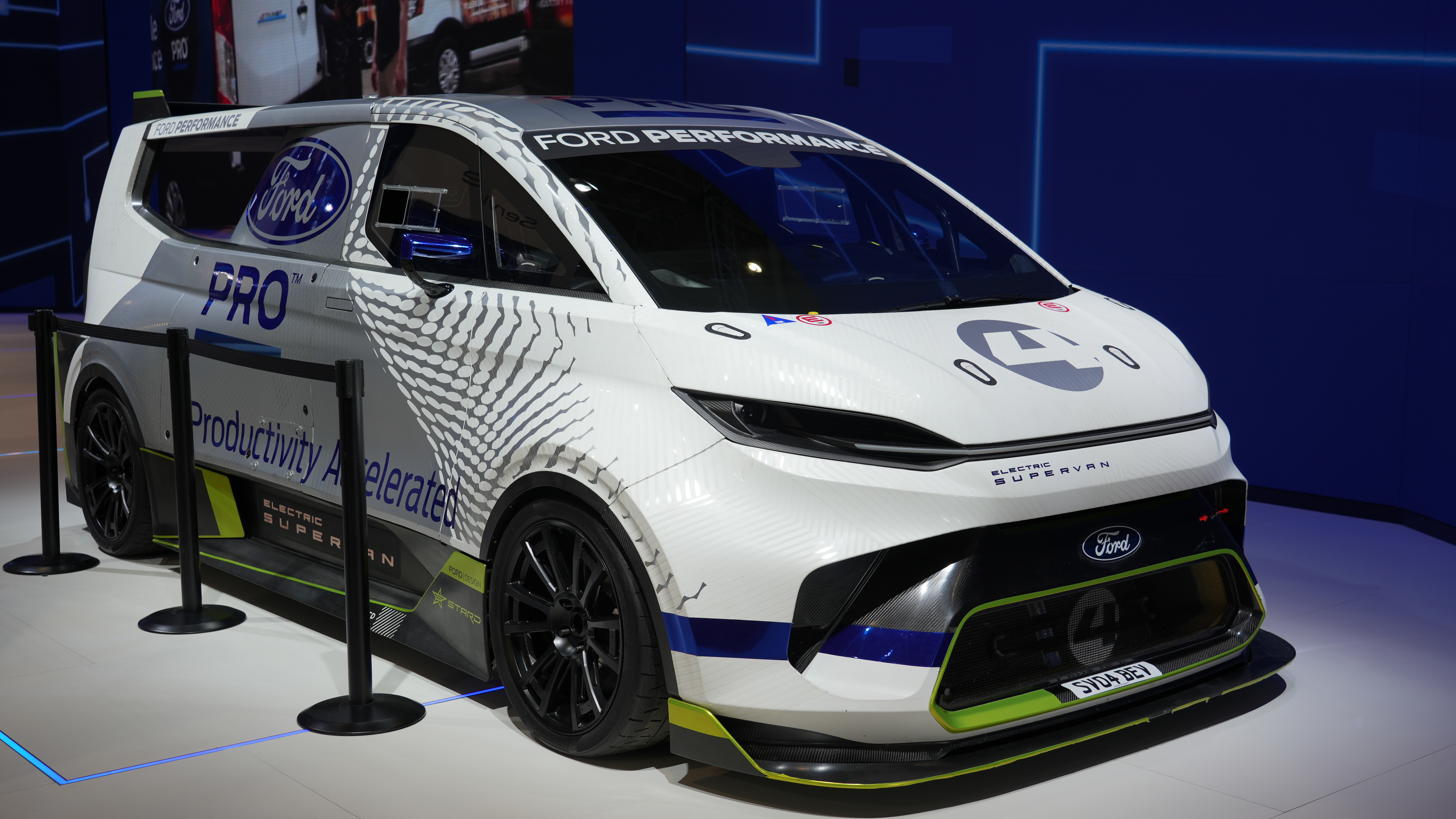

Overview
- Manufacturer: Ford Motor Company
- Production: 2022

Body and chassis
- Body style: Van
- Layout: Mid Engine, AWD
- Doors: 2-doors
- Related: Ford F-150 Lightning

Powertrain
- Engine: 4 Electric Motors
- Power output: 1,400.0 kilowatts (1,877.4 brake horsepower; 1,903.5 metric horsepower); 1,600.0 newton-metres (1,180.1 pound force-feet)
- Transmission: 2-speed Automatic
- Range: 22 miles (35 km)

Dimensions
- Width: 2,100 millimetres (83 in)
- Curb weight: 1,989.0 kilograms (4,385.0 pounds)

At the 2022 Goodwood Festival of Speed, the Ford Pro Electric SuperVan was introduced as a collaboration between Ford Performance and STARD. The first all-electric Ford SuperVan (and the fourth so far) achieves the highest-performance of any Ford van ever. With four electric motors, a 50kWh liquid-cooled battery and a bespoke control system, it produces a total power output of approximately 1,400.0 kilowatts (1,877.4 bhp). This enables it to accelerate from zero to 62 mph (100 km/h) in under 2 seconds. The purpose-built chassis includes components from the recently unveiled electric Ford Transit Custom – the first fully electric version of the Ford Transit.

== SuperVan 4.2 Electric ==
Ford Supervan 4.2
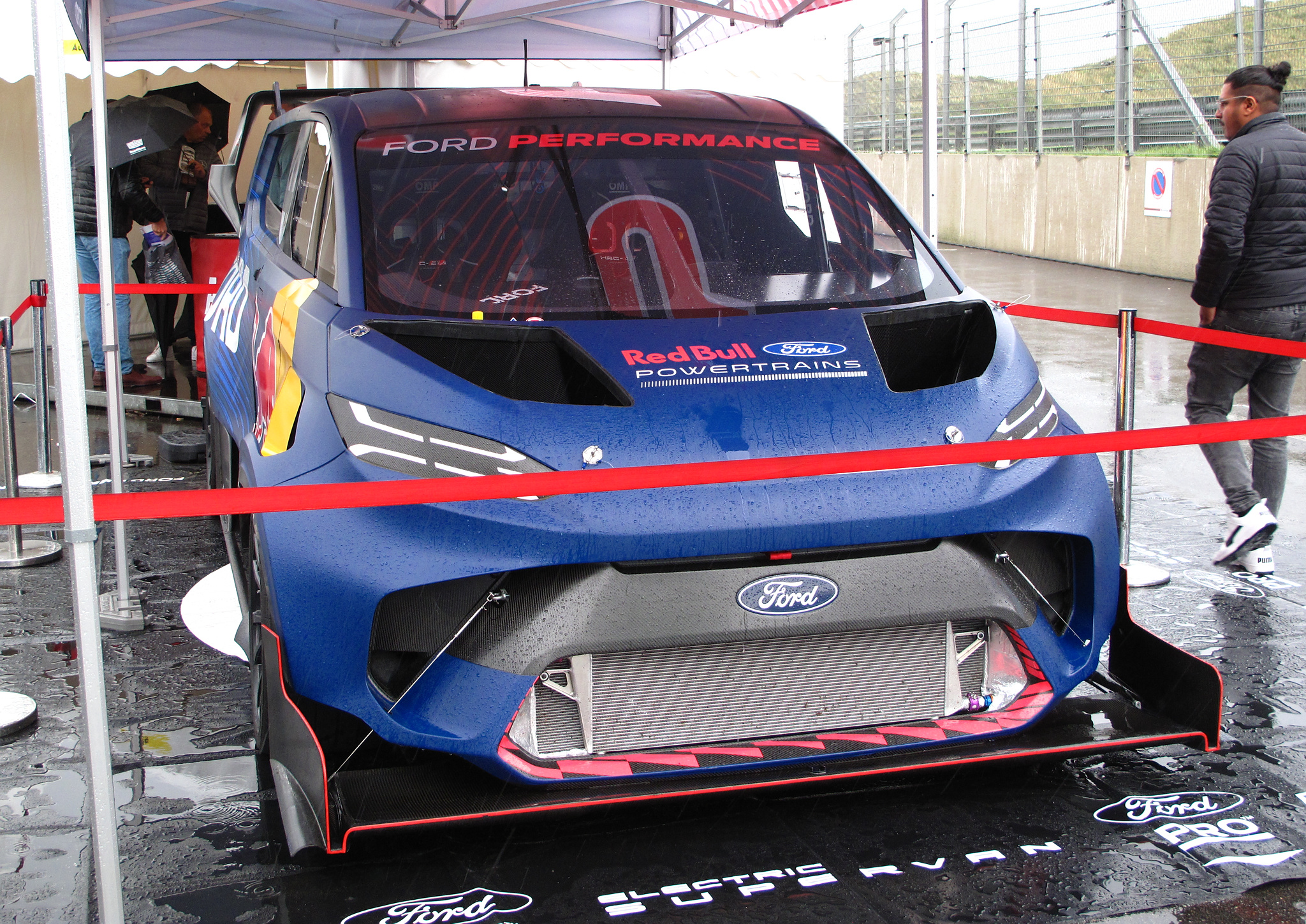

Overview
- Manufacturer: Ford Motor Company
- Production: 2023
- Designer: Ernesto Rupar; Sebastian Toddenroth

Body and chassis
- Body style: Van
- Layout: Mid Engine, AWD
- Doors: 2-doors
- Related: Ford F-150 Lightning

Powertrain
- Engine: 3 Electric Motors
- Power output: 2,012.0 brake horsepower (1,500.3 kilowatts; 2,039.9 metric horsepower); 2,950.0 pound force-feet (3,999.7 newton-metres)
- Transmission: Single Speed

Dimensions
- Length: 5,230 millimetres (206 in)
- Width: 2,290 millimetres (90 in)
- Height: 1,990 millimetres (78 in)
- Curb weight: 4,400.0 pounds (1,995.8 kilograms)

In 2023, the SuperVan 4 was rebuilt as the SuperVan 4.2, once again in partnership with STARD, with the goal of competing at the 101st Pikes Peak International Hill Climb. The SuperVan 4.2 was designed specifically for hill climbing, and features large front and rear spoilers, and a revised 3-motor all-wheel-drive powertrain with a total power output of 1,500 kW (2040 hp). Other changes from the SuperVan 4 include a new livery, an upgraded 600 kW regenerative braking system, a rebuilt frame, weight reduction, and a new high performance Li-Po NCM battery.

On June 25, 2023, the Ford SuperVan 4.2 competed at the 101st Pikes Peak International Hill Climb, driven by Romain Dumas, finishing 1st in its division (Pikes Peak Open) and 2nd overall, with a time of 8:47.682.

On 25 February 2024 it set a lap time of 1:56.28 at Bathurst's Mount Panorama Circuit, faster than all V8 vehicles, and all else, except F1 promotional laps.

On 14 July 2024 it finished 1st at the 2024 Goodwood Festival of Speed Hillclimb Shootout with a time of 0:43.98, driven by Romain Dumas. Dumas repeated this feat finishing 1st in 2025 with a time of 43.22.

In December 2024, it ran a lap time of 1:05.3 at the Top Gear test track.

== See also ==
- Renault Espace F1
