= Jordan 191 =

Formula One racing car

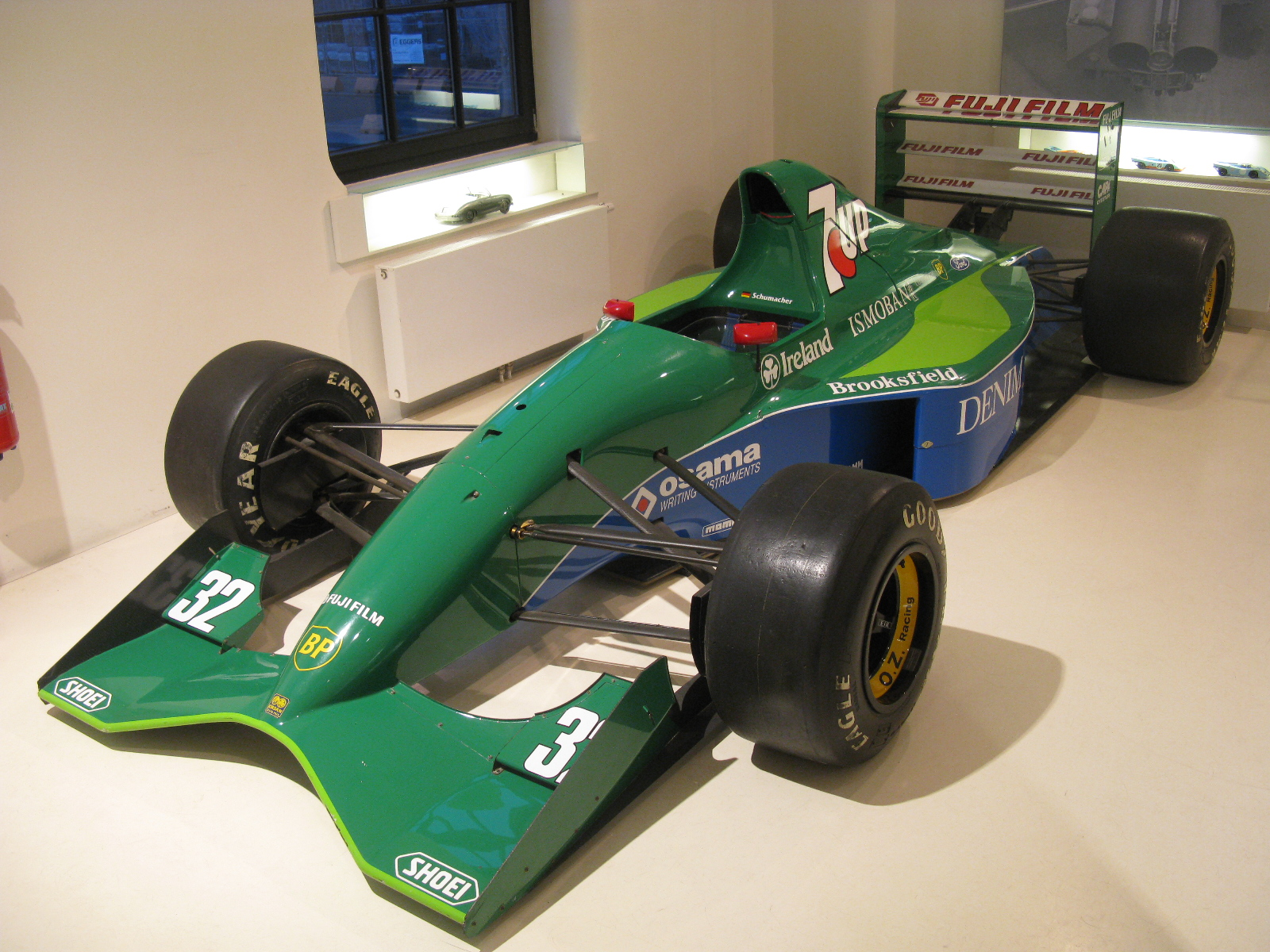
- The Jordan 191 of Michael Schumacher
- Category: Formula One
- Constructor: Jordan
- Designers: Gary Anderson (Technical Director); Mark Smith (Senior Design Engineer - Transmission); Andrew Green (Senior Design Engineer - Suspension)
- Successor: 192

Technical specifications
- Chassis: Carbon fibre monocoque
- Suspension (front): Double wishbone, pushrod operated dampers
- Suspension (rear): Double wishbone, pushrod operated dampers
- Engine: Ford HBA4, 3,494 cc (213.2 cu in), 75° V8, NA, mid-engine, longitudinally mounted
- Transmission: Jordan / Hewland 6-speed manual
- Power: 650 hp (484.7 kW) @ 13,000 rpm
- Fuel: BP
- Tyres: Goodyear

Competition history
- Notable entrants: Team 7UP Jordan
- Notable drivers: 32. (Belgium) Bertrand Gachot; 32. (Germany) Michael Schumacher; 32. (Brazil) Roberto Moreno; 32. (Italy) Alessandro Zanardi; 33. (Italy) Andrea de Cesaris
- Debut: 1991 United States Grand Prix
- Last event: 1991 Australian Grand Prix
Races	Wins	Podiums	Poles	F/Laps
16	0	0	0	1
- Constructors' Championships: 0
- Drivers' Championships: 0

The Jordan 191 was a Formula One car designed by Gary Anderson for use by Jordan Grand Prix in its debut season in 1991. Its best finish was in Canada and Mexico, where Andrea de Cesaris drove it to fourth place at both races. Driving the 191 at the 1991 Hungarian Grand Prix, Bertrand Gachot took the fastest lap of the race.

== Background ==
Eddie Jordan was an Irish racing driver who had achieved some success in British Formula 3 but moved into team ownership after recognising he had reached the peak of his own racing career. His team, Eddie Jordan Racing (EJR), ran initially in Formula Ford and steadily progressed through the motorsport tiers. In 1988 EJR ran a pair of F3000 cars for Johnny Herbert and Martin Donnelly and the following year won the F3000 championship with Jean Alesi.

Jordan then established Jordan Grand Prix with a view to entering Formula One and hired Gary Anderson to design his team's first Formula One chassis. Anderson had previously worked for Reynard and had designed that manufacturer's F3000 car. He would carry out design work on what was eventually designated the 191 (Note: It was originally to be called the 911. After complaints from Porsche, Eddie Jordan renamed his car the 191. By way of compensation, he was loaned a Porsche car for 18 months.) in between F3000 racing weekends, during which he would engineer EJR's F3000 race cars.

== Design and development ==
Anderson was the leader of a team of three that were involved in the design of the 191 car; Andrew Green worked on the suspension, Mark Smith did the gearbox and this left Anderson the task of the bodywork and aerodynamics. The car had a tidy form with a raised nose and a drooping rear diffuser. Originally designed for the Judd V8, the 191 ended up being powered by a Cosworth-Ford HB V8 engine, Jordan having arranged a customer supply after fortuitously making contact with a senior executive at Cosworth.

On the sponsorship front, after failed negotiations with the cigarette brand Camel that had sponsored Jordan's F3000 team, Jordan signed 7 Up, a soft drink company, as the team's major sponsor. The 7 Up corporate colour was green and this tied in with that of the Japanese camera film company Fuji. After Eddie Jordan approached the company, terms were agreed and Fuji also joined as a sponsor. Jordan also gained sponsorship from the Irish Tourism Board as he knew that the Irish government was trying to get technology companies to base themselves in Ireland, pitching to them "Look, here's a country that is renowned for things like potatoes, butter, Guinness. It's going to be a lot easier for you to advertise yourselves if you associate with an F1 team – it's the pinnacle of technology".

By November 1990, the 191 was complete and its first test run was conducted by John Watson at the Silverstone circuit. The initial feedback was relatively favourable and further testing was completed at the Paul Ricard circuit in France. The team's drivers had been selected; they were to be the experienced Italian Andrea de Cesaris and Belgian Bertrand Gachot. (Note: Both drivers brought some sponsorship from Marlboro.)

A total of seven 191 chassis were built across the year; one was destroyed in an accident at the British Grand Prix.

== Racing history ==
Due to the number of teams taking part in the 1991 Formula One season, Jordan had to complete pre-qualifying at the start of each race weekend in order to be allowed entry into qualifying proper. A total of eight cars were entered for pre-qualifying, with the four fastest continuing onto qualifying.

At the opening round of the season in Phoenix, de Cesaris failed to pre-qualify, blighted by engine problems. In contrast, Gachot sailed through and comfortably qualified 14th for the race itself. Engine failure ended Gachot's race on lap 75 and he was classified tenth, having run as high as seventh at one stage of the race.

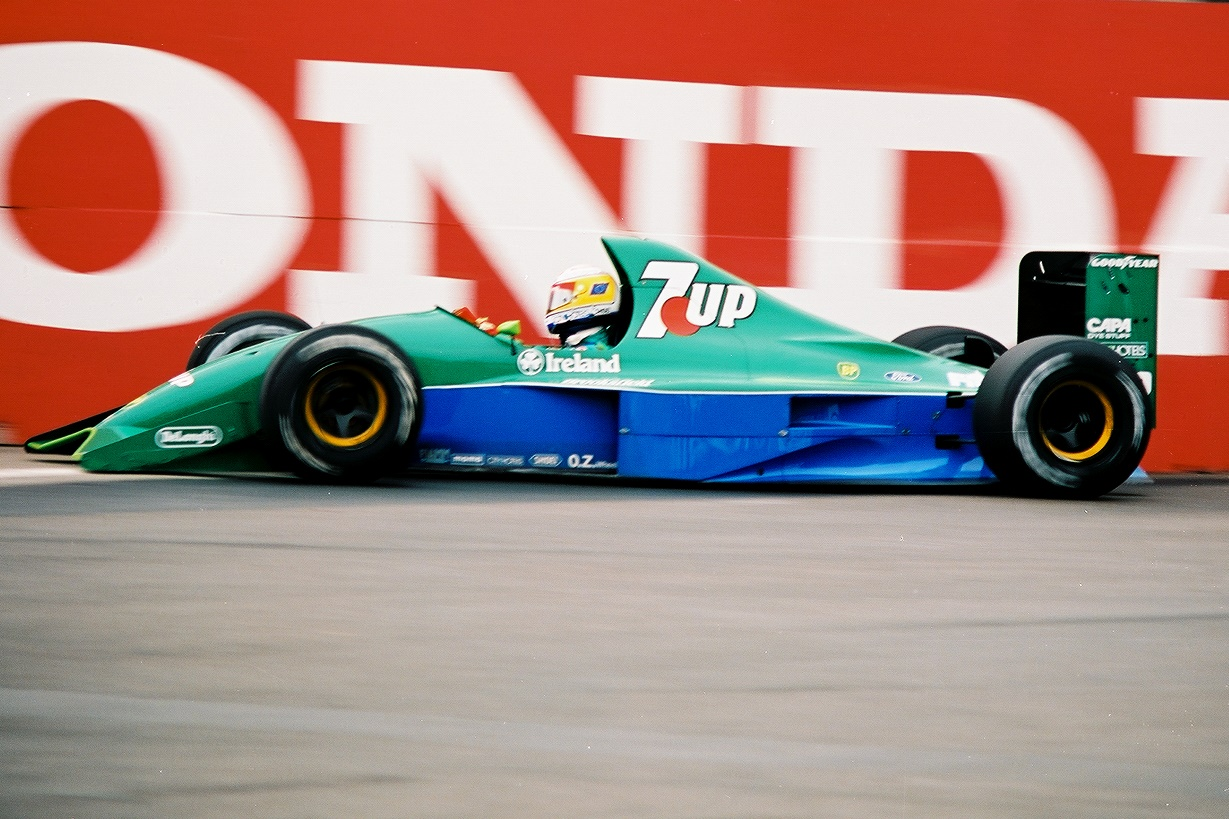
Bertrand Gachot driving the 191 at Jordan's first F1 race, the 1991 United States Grand Prix.

Both drivers made the grid comfortably at the following Brazilian Grand Prix, Gachot in tenth and de Cesaris in 13th. Gachot was again not running at the finish but had completed enough laps to be classified in 13th while de Cesaris retired, having had an accident. Both drivers retired from the San Marino Grand Prix but at the next race, in Montreal, de Cesaris scored the team's best finish of the season, with a fourth place. He was followed home by the fifth-placed Gachot, earning Jordan its first points of the year.

At the following race in Mexico City, de Cesaris again finished fourth, having qualified in 11th place. Gachot started from 20th on the grid but had worked his way up to fifth place when he spun off the circuit. He also retired from the next race, the French Grand Prix, spinning out on the first lap having qualified 19th. De Cesaris, from 13th on the grid, went on to finish sixth in the race, adding another point to Jordan's total. By the German Grand Prix, the number of points scored by de Cesaris and Gachot meant that Jordan were not required to pre-qualify for the remainder of the season.

After the Hungarian Grand Prix, Gachot's season was curtailed by a two-month prison sentence, for spraying CS gas at a taxi driver in London. Over the final six races, three drivers filled in for Gachot: Michael Schumacher, Roberto Moreno and Alex Zanardi. Schumacher was a revelation in his first F1 race weekend at the 1991 Belgian Grand Prix, qualifying seventh on the grid (Jordan's joint-best ever at that time), outqualifying de Cesaris who was eleventh. Despite this, Schumacher retired from the race on the first lap after his clutch failed. Having made his way into second place by the final stages of the race, De Cesaris also retired, within a few laps of the finish, and was eventually classified in 13th.

Prior to the next race in Italy, a legal wrangle between Benetton and Jordan developed, with Schumacher signing for Benetton, a team with which he would later win his first two Drivers Championships and a Constructors Championship. This sent Moreno packing from Benetton and Jordan signed him up as a replacement. Moreno did two races, in Italy and Portugal, achieving little, before Jordan handed a novice, Zanardi, his debut in the final three races. He completed a pair of ninth-place finishes intervened with a retirement.

== Summary and legacy ==
In their first season, Jordan finished fifth in the Constructors' Championship, scoring 13 points with the 191. De Cesaris was ninth in the Drivers' Championship with nine points while Gachot's four points earned him a share of 12th.

The 191 is considered by many to be one of the most beautiful Formula 1 cars of all time. The car won the Autosport Racing Car of the Year award for 1991.

== Complete Formula One results ==
(key) (results in italics indicate fastest lap)

Year	Team	Engine	Tyres	Drivers	1	2	3	4	5	6	7	8	9	10	11	12	13	14	15	16	Points	WCC
1991	Team 7UP Jordan	Ford HBA4; V8	G		USA	BRA	SMR	MON	CAN	MEX	FRA	GBR	GER	HUN	BEL	ITA	POR	ESP	JPN	AUS	13	5th
1991	Team 7UP Jordan	Ford HBA4; V8	G	Bertrand Gachot	10	13	Ret	8	5	Ret	Ret	6	6	9							13	5th
1991	Team 7UP Jordan	Ford HBA4; V8	G	Michael Schumacher											Ret						13	5th
1991	Team 7UP Jordan	Ford HBA4; V8	G	Roberto Moreno												Ret	10				13	5th
1991	Team 7UP Jordan	Ford HBA4; V8	G	Alessandro Zanardi														9	Ret	9	13	5th
1991	Team 7UP Jordan	Ford HBA4; V8	G	Andrea de Cesaris	DNPQ	Ret	Ret	Ret	4	4	6	Ret	5	7	13	7	8	Ret	Ret	8	13	5th

== Notes ==
=== Citations ===
Awards
Preceded by Tyrrell 019	Autosport; Racing Car Of The Year; 1991	Succeeded by Williams FW14B
