= Andrea de Cesaris =

Italian racing driver (1959–2014)

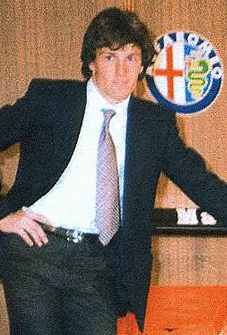
- De Cesaris in 1982
- Born: 31 May 1959; Rome, Italy
- Died: 5 October 2014 (aged 55); Rome, Italy
- Cause of death: Single-vehicle motorcycle road collision

Formula One World Championship career
- Nationality: (Italy) Italian
- Active years: 1980–1994
- Team(s): Alfa Romeo, McLaren, Ligier, Minardi, Brabham, Rial, Scuderia Italia, Jordan, Tyrrell, Sauber
- Entries: 214 (208 starts)
- Championships: 0
- Wins: 0
- Podiums: 5
- Career points: 59
- Pole positions: 1
- Fastest laps: 1
- First entry: 1980 Canadian Grand Prix
- Last entry: 1994 European Grand Prix

Andrea de Cesaris (Italian pronunciation: [anˈdrɛːa de ˈtʃeːzaris]; 31 May 1959 – 5 October 2014) was an Italian racing driver, who competed in Formula One from 1980 to 1994.

De Cesaris started 208 Formula One Grands Prix without victory, holding the record for the most races without a win from 1989 until being surpassed by Nico Hülkenberg at the 2024 Miami Grand Prix. A string of accidents early in his career earned him a reputation for being a fast but wild driver.

In 2005 and 2006, de Cesaris competed in the Grand Prix Masters formula for retired Formula One drivers. He died on 5 October 2014 after losing control of his motorcycle on Rome's Grande Raccordo Anulare motorway.

== Driving career ==
=== Pre-Formula One ===
A multiple karting champion, de Cesaris graduated to Formula 3 in Britain, winning numerous events and finishing second in the 1979 British Formula Three Championship, as runner up to Chico Serra. From Formula 3, he graduated to Formula 2 with future McLaren boss Ron Dennis' Project 4 team.

=== Formula One ===
==== Alfa Romeo (1980) ====
Related article: Alfa Romeo in Formula One

In 1980, de Cesaris was picked up by Alfa Romeo for the final events of the 1980 World Championship, replacing Vittorio Brambilla who had, in turn, replaced Patrick Depailler when he was killed during testing at Hockenheim. His first race in Canada ended after eight laps because of engine failure. In his second race, at Watkins Glen in the United States, he tangled with Derek Daly in a Tyrrell at the Junction corner and crashed into the catch fencing after two laps.

==== McLaren (1981) ====
Related article: McLaren

In 1981, largely thanks to his personal Marlboro sponsorship which also happened to be McLaren's main sponsor, de Cesaris landed a seat at McLaren which had merged with the Project Four Formula 2 team run by Ron Dennis after the 1980 season. During the season, de Cesaris proved to be fast on occasion (particularly at fast circuits), but he crashed 19 times that season either in practice or in the race, often due to driver error. The team was so worried that he would crash the car that they withdrew his car from the Dutch Grand Prix in Zandvoort after he qualified 13th. De Cesaris managed to finish only six of the 14 races he started that year. Due to the frequent crashes, he earned the nickname "Andrea de Crasheris"; team boss Ron Dennis grew so annoyed with de Cesaris's constant crashes that not only did he not extend the Italian's contract, he never actually hired an Italian driver to McLaren ever again.

In July 1981, de Cesaris and Henri Pescarolo finished second to the team of Riccardo Patrese and Michele Alboreto in a six-hour endurance race at Watkins Glen, New York. Both teams drove Lancia cars with de Cesaris and Pescarolo finishing two laps behind.

==== Alfa Romeo (1982–1983) ====
Related article: Alfa Romeo in Formula One

After switching back to Alfa Romeo in 1982, de Cesaris became the youngest man ever to take pole position at the Long Beach Grand Prix. De Cesaris was also only the second Alfa Romeo driver to capture a pole since 1951. De Cesaris led the race but as he was passing a backmarker at a tight corner with Niki Lauda right behind him in second, de Cesaris waved his fist at the backmarker and forgot to change gear and hit the rev limiter, which allowed Lauda to take the lead and win the race; de Cesaris suffered rear brake failure and crashed hard at Pine Avenue.

In the 1982 season, de Cesaris earned a podium finish at Monte Carlo and a point in Canada. At the 1982 Monaco Grand Prix, Didier Pironi retired on the final lap due to electrical trouble with his Ferrari. De Cesaris ran out of fuel at the same time, allowing Riccardo Patrese to win his first Formula 1 race.

In 1983, with his Alfa Romeo now using a turbo engine, he took two second places, one at the 1983 German Grand Prix at Hockenheim (his first points of the season) and the other one in the season-closing 1983 South African Grand Prix at Kyalami, 9.319 seconds behind Riccardo Patrese. De Cesaris came close to winning at Spa-Francorchamps, after comfortably leading the Renault of Alain Prost for much of the race before a botched pit stop delayed him and a blown engine put him out of the race.

==== Ligier (1984–1985) ====
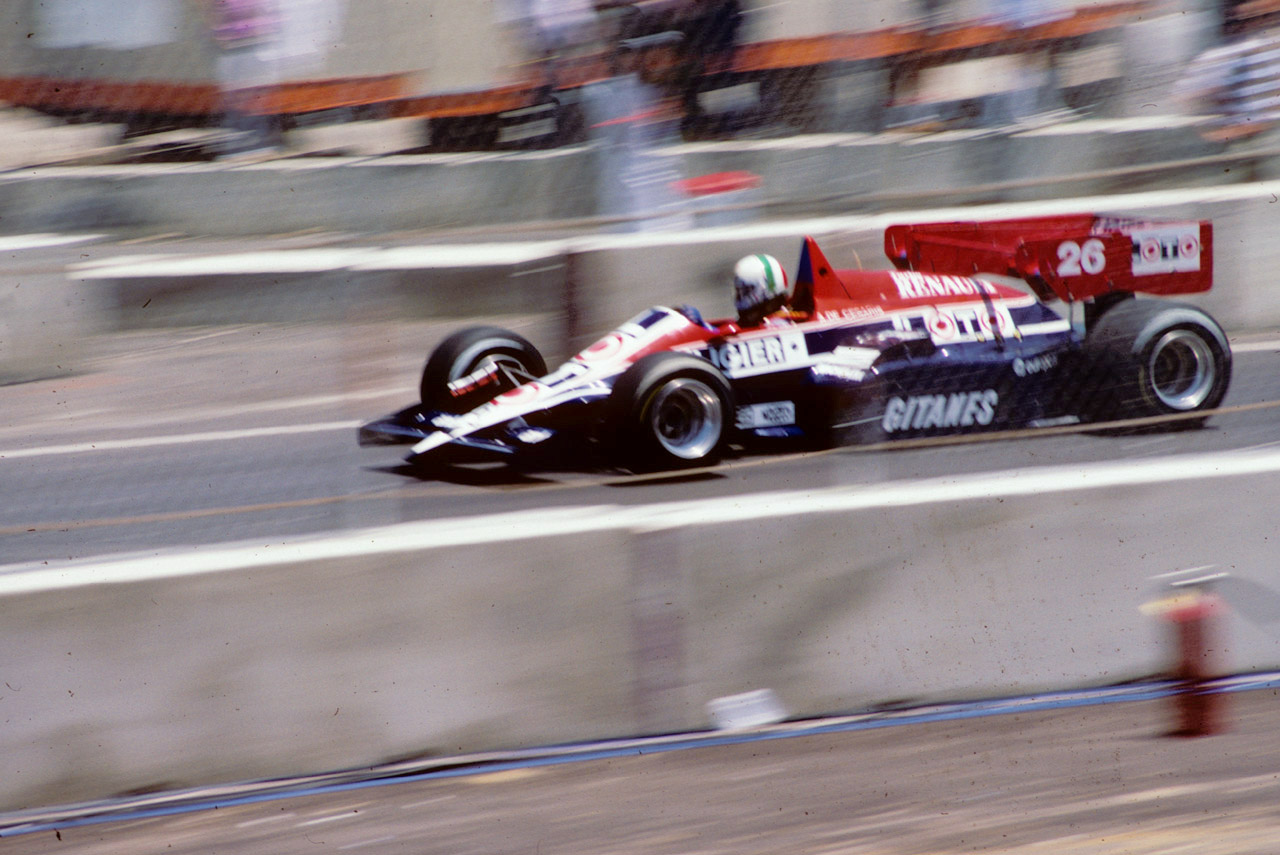
De Cesaris driving for Ligier in the 1984 Dallas Grand Prix.

De Cesaris moved to Ligier in 1984, where despite the car's promising Renault turbo engine, he scored only three points during the season.

At the end of 1984, de Cesaris and Ligier teammate François Hesnault travelled to Australia to drive in the 1984 Australian Grand Prix, the last domestic Australian Grand Prix before the race became part of the Formula One World Championship in 1985. Driving a Ford BDA powered Ralt RT4 (18 of the 25 car field were RT4s), de Cesaris qualified in fifth place. After entering the pits at the end of the warm up lap, he exited the pits moments before the green flag and was almost a lap behind when the race started. He then proceeded to put in what many consider as the drive of the day to eventually finish third (without ever losing a lap) behind Roberto Moreno (winner) and Keke Rosberg.

In 1985, a number of strong performances, including a fourth place at Monaco, showed early promise but the season turned into a dismal one after de Cesaris destroyed his Ligier JS25 in a quadruple mid-air rollover at the Austrian Grand Prix, and was fired by team boss Guy Ligier as a result. Guy Ligier stated that "I can no longer afford to employ this man", despite Marlboro paying the bulk of de Cesaris' salary. He was kept in the team until the next race at Zandvoort, after which he was replaced by Philippe Streiff.

==== Minardi (1986) ====
Related article: Minardi

In 1986, de Cesaris moved to Minardi. He was often outpaced by his teammate, fellow Italian and F1 rookie Alessandro Nannini during the season. For the first time in his career, de Cesaris went the entire season without scoring a point; he retired from every race but two (DNQ in Monaco, eighth in Mexico).

==== Brabham (1987) ====
Related article: Brabham

In 1987, de Cesaris switched to Brabham-BMW. With the Bernie Ecclestone-owned team he was able to achieve better results, even though he mostly failed to match his teammate Riccardo Patrese. He did not finish (DNF) 14 of 16 races. At the 1987 Belgian Grand Prix at Spa, Belgium, de Cesaris placed third behind Alain Prost and Stefan Johansson, his first points in nearly two years and his first podium finish since the final round of the 1983 season in South Africa. He would not finish another race that season.

==== Rial (1988) ====
Related article: Rial

For 1988, Brabham pulled out of Formula One and de Cesaris switched to the new Rial team, run by German Günter Schmid, the former boss of the ATS outfit. With a Cosworth engine in the car, de Cesaris managed to qualify for all sixteen races of the season and take fourth place in the Detroit Grand Prix. He also twice ran out of fuel in the last laps while running in the points, in Canada and Australia.

==== Dallara (1989–1990) ====
Related articles: Dallara, BMS Scuderia Italia

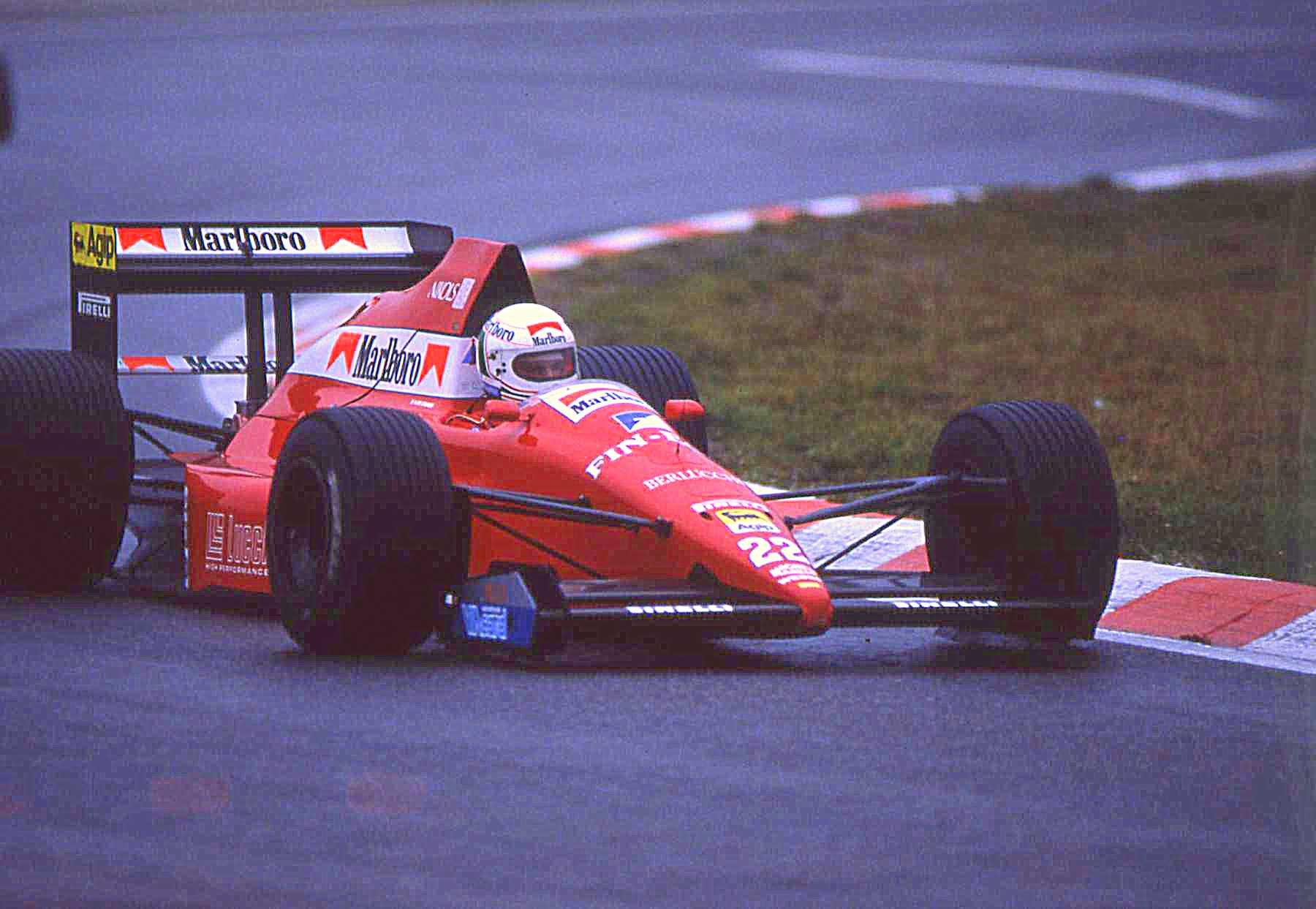
De Cesaris at the 1989 Belgian Grand Prix

For 1989, de Cesaris moved to the Marlboro-sponsored Scuderia Italia squad. Early results were again promising. By now one of the more experienced drivers in the field, de Cesaris was on course for a podium position in Monte Carlo, before being taken out by triple world champion Nelson Piquet at the Loews Hairpin. De Cesaris lost his temper after the accident and berated Piquet's Lotus team upon returning to the pits. Two races later, after an early delay, he was being lapped by Dallara teammate Alex Caffi when he ran his fellow Italian into the wall, robbing his team of a potential podium. De Cesaris finished third at the next race in Canada, behind Williams drivers Thierry Boutsen and Riccardo Patrese in a rain-soaked race. The race would be the last time de Cesaris stood on the Formula One podium.

With a number of teams using either Ford or Judd customer V8s (Dallara used the Ford DFR) in 1990, the midfield had become more competitive. De Cesaris was involved in a number of incidents during that season, including crashing out at the start of the first lap at Interlagos and at Imola. He also nearly took out the Ferrari of 2nd-placed Nigel Mansell while being lapped during the race, prompting BBC commentator and 1976 World Champion James Hunt to call him an idiot on live television. Reliability was a problem for Dallara, and de Cesaris again failed to score a point all season.

==== Jordan (1991) ====
Related article: Jordan Grand Prix

Dumped for JJ Lehto at Dallara at the end of 1990, de Cesaris was signed by Eddie Jordan for his team's first season in Formula One. Jordan had already run de Cesaris in Formula 3.

At the season's first race in Phoenix, de Cesaris selected the wrong gear in the short pre-qualifying session, buzzed the engine and was out. De Cesaris showed better form at Monaco, forcing his way past the Benetton of Roberto Moreno and was running in the points until the Jordan's throttle cable snapped.

In the next race in Canada, de Cesaris finished fourth. He then repeated the result next time out in Mexico. The following race in France, he finished sixth. Suspension failure in Great Britain led him to crash but the Italian bounced back to qualify seventh and finish fifth in Germany.

De Cesaris did not score again until the 1991 Belgian Grand Prix at Spa-Franchorchamps. Despite the pressure of being outqualified by debutant teammate Michael Schumacher, de Cesaris moved through the field to take second position until his car's Ford HB V8 blew. A communication problem between Ford and the Jordan team meant the oil tank in the car was too small to service a new type of piston ring, which used more lubricant.

De Cesaris finished the season ninth in the standings, his best result since 1983.

==== Tyrrell (1992–1993) ====
Related article: Tyrrell Racing

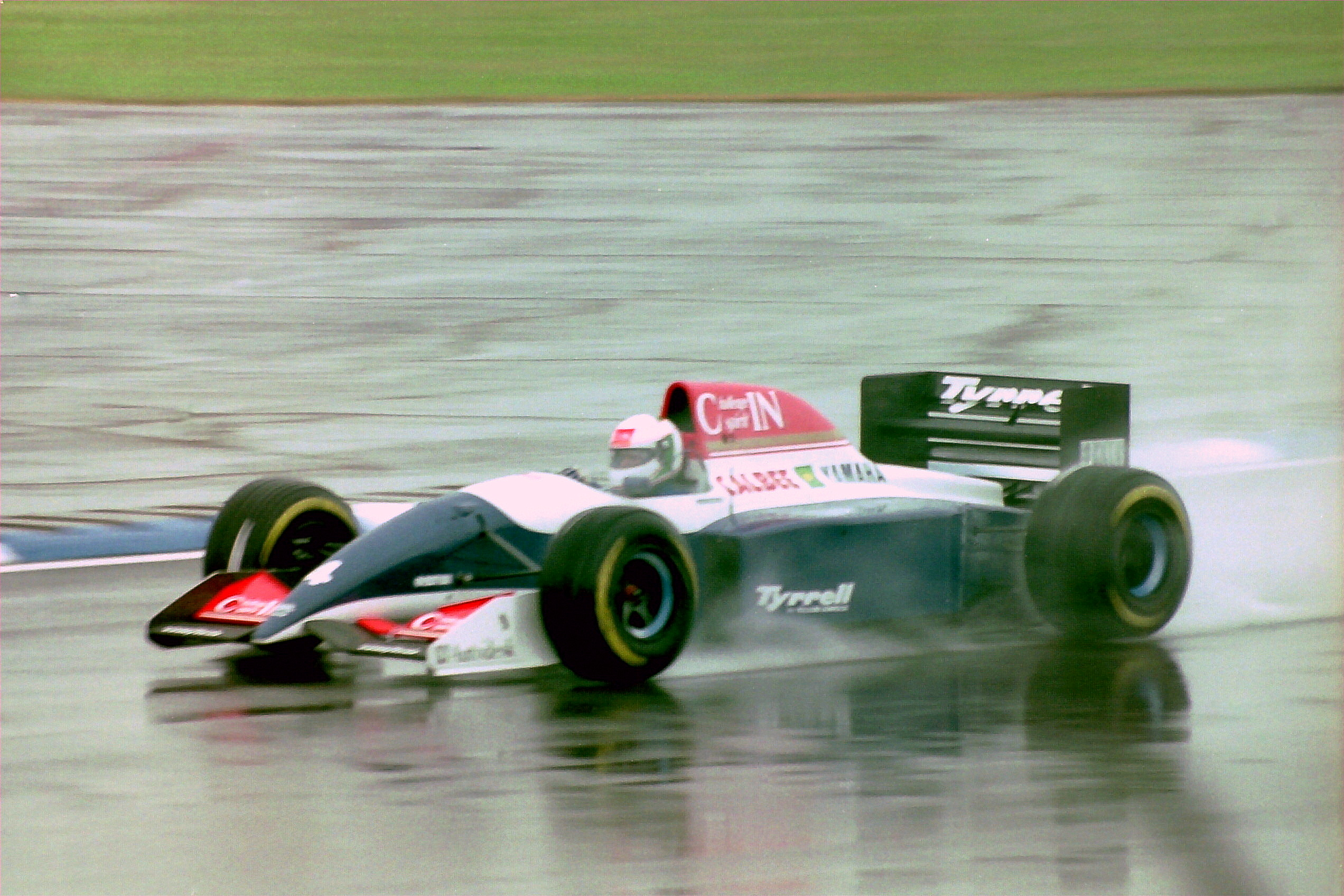
De Cesaris at the 1993 British Grand Prix

Despite Eddie Jordan's desire to keep de Cesaris for the 1992 season, financial realities meant it was not possible. Jordan had built up significant debts in his debut season but was able to secure sponsorship from Barclay Cigarettes. However, the brand was in direct conflict with de Cesaris' Marlboro backing.

Ken Tyrrell hired de Cesaris for his team for the 1992 season. De Cesaris took a fifth in the second race of the season in Mexico, despite being caught up in an early spin.

De Cesaris was able to score points three more times during the season, with his best result being a fourth place in the Japanese Grand Prix.

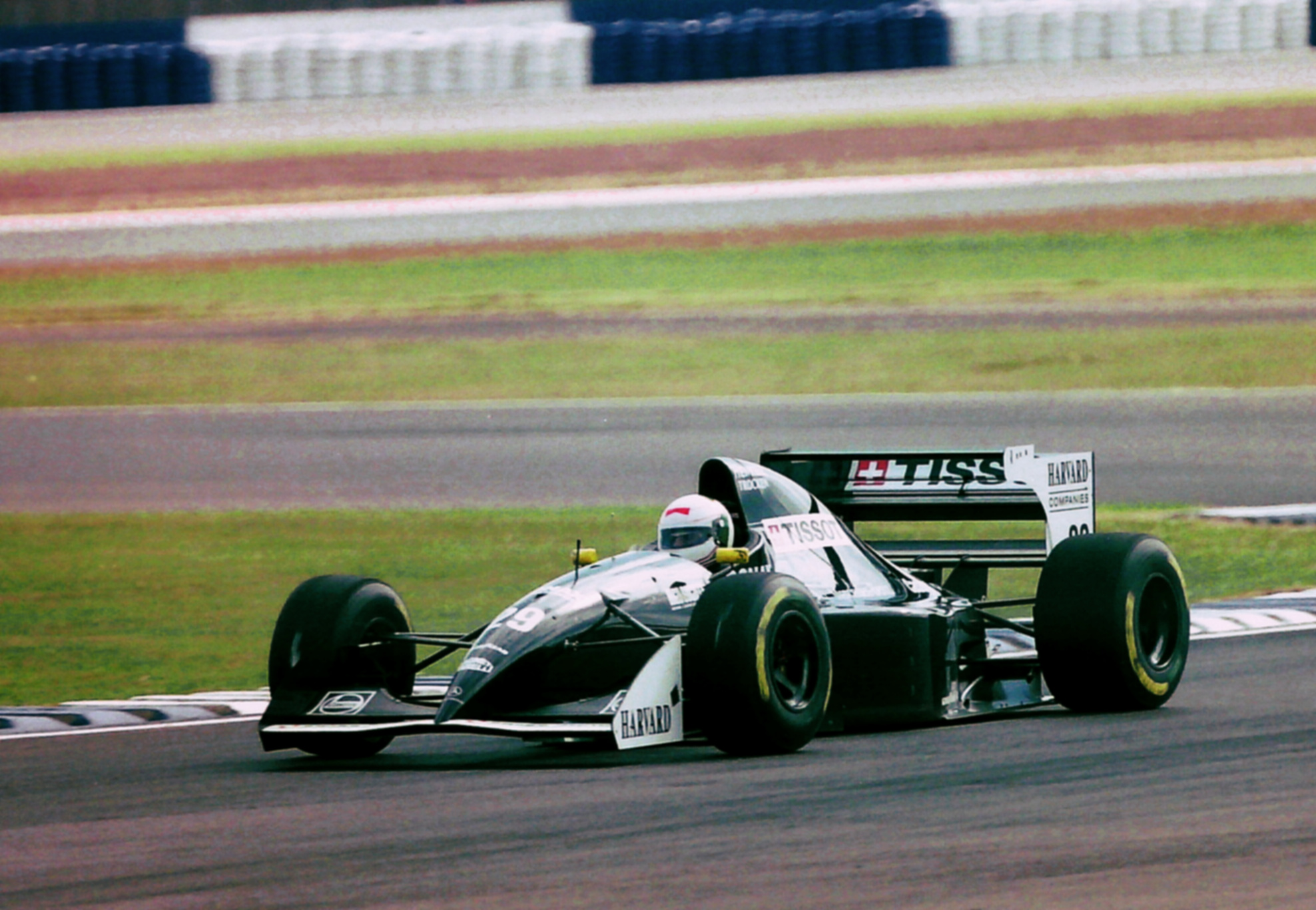
De Cesaris driving the Sauber C13 at the 1994 British Grand Prix at Silverstone.

For the 1993 season, the Ilmor engine had been replaced with a Yamaha V10, which changed the dynamics and reliability of the car. The Tyrrell 020 was also replaced mid-season by the Tyrrell 021 due to age. This car, featuring active suspension, was not a success. For the third time in his career, de Cesaris failed to score a point and left Tyrrell at the end of the season.

==== Jordan and Sauber (1994) ====
Related articles: Jordan Grand Prix, Sauber

In 1994, for the first time since 1980, de Cesaris started the season without a Formula One drive. But during the Brazilian Grand Prix, Eddie Irvine was blamed for causing a massive accident which saw Jos Verstappen barrel roll over the top of Martin Brundle. On appeal, Irvine was banned for three races. At the Pacific Grand Prix, Aguri Suzuki drove Irvine's vacated Jordan. But for the next race, the San Marino Grand Prix, Eddie Jordan brought de Cesaris back to the team.

The return didn't start well after de Cesaris damaged a chassis during testing. He crashed again during the San Marino Grand Prix at Imola due to poor fitness, having not driven a race distance in six months. He bounced back in Monte Carlo, where de Cesaris stayed away from trouble and away from the barriers to take fourth place. Irvine returned for the next race but Sauber had noticed the Italian's form, and signed him to replace the injured Karl Wendlinger in the Mercedes-powered machines.

De Cesaris' first race for Sauber was his 200th Grand Prix, in Canada. Although there he retired after 24 laps, he finished in the points at the next event, the French Grand Prix at Magny-Cours.

De Cesaris' career ended when he retired with throttle problems at the 1994 European Grand Prix. JJ Lehto replaced him for the final two Grands Prix. De Cesaris ended his career with 208 Grand Prix starts, second only to Riccardo Patrese at the time. Numerous other drivers have since surpassed his total.

== Legacy ==
De Cesaris participated in a total of 214 grands prix. He achieved five podiums, one pole position, and scored a total of 59 championship points. He was the driver with the most Grand Prix starts (208) to his name without a win, until Nico Hülkenberg surpassed him in this respect in 2024. He also holds the records for the most consecutive non-finishes, 18 from 1985 and 1986 (although many of these were mechanical failures), as well as the most successive non-finishes in a single season, 12 in 1987. Similarly, no driver has had more than his 14 DNFs in a 16-race season. He scored points for 9 out of 10 teams he raced for: McLaren, Alfa Romeo, Brabham, Rial, Tyrrell, Jordan, Ligier, Scuderia Italia and Sauber, failing to do so only for Minardi.

== Retirement ==
After retiring from motor racing, de Cesaris became a successful currency broker in Monte Carlo. It has been reported that he spent six months of the year in this occupation and the remainder windsurfing in Hawaii, Mexico, and around the world.

== Helmet ==
De Cesaris' helmet was white with three diagonal lines resembling the Italian flag running across the top, and a red line between two green lines in the chin area.

== Racing revival ==
Long absent from the Formula One paddock, de Cesaris appeared at the 2005 Monaco Grand Prix, and was welcomed back with a warm hug from former Brabham team boss and Formula One boss Bernie Ecclestone. A few months later it was announced de Cesaris would race in the new Grand Prix Masters series for retired Formula One drivers. In October, he set the fastest time in the first Grand Prix Masters test at the Silverstone South circuit in England. Due to his passion for windsurfing, de Cesaris retained a high level of fitness in comparison to other retired drivers. In the first race at the Kyalami circuit in South Africa, de Cesaris qualified well and raced to fourth, after a fierce battle with Briton Derek Warwick.

== Death ==
De Cesaris was killed in a road accident on 5 October 2014 at age 55 while riding his Suzuki motorbike. Italian press reported that he died on impact with the guard rail on the outer lane of Rome's Grande Raccordo Anulare freeway, in proximity of the Bufalotta turn-off.

== Racing record ==
=== Career summary ===
Season	Series	Team	Races	Wins	Poles	F/Laps	Podiums	Points	Position
1978	FIA European Formula 3	Marlboro Team Tiga	2	0	0	0	0	3	20th
1979	British Formula Three	Marlboro Team Tiga	6	6	4	4	6	90	**2nd**
1979	FIA European Formula 3	Marlboro Team Tiga	1	0	1	0	0	0	NC
1979	European Formula Two	Project Four Racing	1	0	0	0	0	1	21st
1980	European Formula Two	Project Four Racing	11	1	1	0	4	28	5th
1980	Formula One	Marlboro Team Alfa Romeo	2	0	0	0	0	0	NC
1980	World Sportscar Championship	Lancia Corse	1	0	0	0	0	0	NC
1981	Formula One	Marlboro McLaren International	14	0	0	0	0	1	18th
1981	World Sportscar Championship	Martini Racing	4	0	0	0	1	27.5	85th
1982	Formula One	Marlboro Team Alfa Romeo	16	0	1	0	1	5	17th
1983	Formula One	Marlboro Team Alfa Romeo	14	0	0	1	2	15	8th
1984	Formula One	Ligier Loto	16	0	0	0	0	3	18th
1985	Formula One	Équipe Ligier Gitanes	11	0	0	0	0	3	17th
1985	World Sportscar Championship	Martini Racing	1	0	0	1	1	12	32nd
1986	Formula One	Minardi Team	15	0	0	0	0	0	NC
1986	World Sportscar Championship	Martini Racing	2	0	2	1	1	15	34th
1986	World Sportscar Championship	Sponsor Geest Team	1	0	0	0	0	15	34th
1987	Formula One	Motor Racing Developments Ltd.	16	0	0	0	1	4	14th
1988	Formula One	Rial Racing	16	0	0	0	0	3	15th
1988	World Sportscar Championship	Dollop Racing	1	0	0	0	0	0	NC
1989	Formula One	BMS Scuderia Italia	15	0	0	0	1	4	16th
1989	World Sportscar Championship	Mussato Action Car	1	0	0	0	0	0	NC
1990	Formula One	BMS Scuderia Italia	15	0	0	0	0	0	NC
1991	Formula One	Team 7UP Jordan	15	0	0	0	0	9	9th
1992	Formula One	Tyrrell	16	0	0	0	0	8	9th
1993	Formula One	Tyrrell	16	0	0	0	0	0	NC
1994	Formula One	Sasol Jordan	2	0	0	0	0	4	20th
1994	Formula One	Broker Sauber Mercedes Sauber Mercedes	9	0	0	0	0	4	20th
2005	Grand Prix Masters	Team Unipart	1	0	0	0	0	N/A	NC
2006	Grand Prix Masters	Team INA	2	0	0	0	0	N/A	NC

=== Complete European Formula Two Championship results ===
(key) (Races in bold indicate pole position; races in italics indicate fastest lap)

Year	Entrant	Chassis	Engine	1	2	3	4	5	6	7	8	9	10	11	12	Pos.	Points
1979	Project Four Racing	March 792	BMW	SIL	HOC	THR	NÜR	VAL; 6	MUG	PAU	HOC	ZAN	PER	MIS	DON	22nd	1
1980	Project Four Racing	March 802	BMW	THR; 3	**HOC**; Ret	NÜR; Ret	VLL; 2	PAU; Ret	SIL; 2	ZOL; Ret	MUG; 5	ZAN; Ret	PER; 6	MIS; 1	HOC	5th	28

=== Complete Formula One results ===
(key) (Races in bold indicate pole position; races in italics indicate fastest lap)

Year	Entrant	Chassis	Engine	1	2	3	4	5	6	7	8	9	10	11	12	13	14	15	16	WDC	Pts
1980	Marlboro Team Alfa Romeo	Alfa Romeo 179	Alfa Romeo 1260 3.0 V12	ARG	BRA	RSA	USW	BEL	MON	FRA	GBR	GER	AUT	NED	ITA	CAN; Ret	USA; Ret			NC	0
1981	Marlboro McLaren International	McLaren M29F	Ford Cosworth DFV 3.0 V8	USW; Ret	BRA; Ret	ARG; 11	SMR; 6	BEL; Ret												18th	1
1981	Marlboro McLaren International	McLaren MP4	Ford Cosworth DFV 3.0 V8						MON; Ret	ESP; Ret	FRA; 11	GBR; Ret	GER; Ret	AUT; 8	NED; DNS	ITA; 7^{†}	CAN; Ret	CPL; 12		18th	1
1982	Marlboro Team Alfa Romeo	Alfa Romeo 179D	Alfa Romeo 1260 3.0 V12	RSA; 13																17th	5
1982	Marlboro Team Alfa Romeo	Alfa Romeo 182	Alfa Romeo 1260 3.0 V12		BRA; Ret	**USW**; Ret	SMR; Ret	BEL; Ret		DET; Ret	CAN; 6^{†}	NED; Ret	GBR; Ret	FRA; Ret	GER; Ret	AUT; Ret	SUI; 10	ITA; 10	CPL; 9	17th	5
1982	Marlboro Team Alfa Romeo	Alfa Romeo 182B	Alfa Romeo 1260 3.0 V12						MON; 3^{†}											17th	5
1983	Marlboro Team Alfa Romeo	Alfa Romeo 183T	Alfa Romeo 890T 1.5 V8t	BRA; EX	USW; Ret	FRA; 12	SMR; Ret	MON; Ret	BEL; Ret	DET; Ret	CAN; Ret	GBR; 8	GER; 2	AUT; Ret	NED; Ret	ITA; Ret	EUR; 4	RSA; 2		8th	15
1984	Ligier Loto	Ligier JS23	Renault EF4 1.5 V6t	BRA; Ret	RSA; 5	BEL; Ret	SMR; 6^{†}	FRA; 10	MON; Ret	CAN; Ret	DET; Ret	DAL; Ret	GBR; 10	GER; 7	AUT; Ret	NED; Ret	ITA; Ret			18th	3
1984	Ligier Loto	Ligier JS23B	Renault EF4 1.5 V6t															EUR; 7	POR; 12	18th	3
1985	Équipe Ligier Gitanes	Ligier JS25	Renault EF4B 1.5 V6t	BRA; Ret	POR; Ret	SMR; Ret	MON; 4	CAN; 14	DET; 10	FRA; Ret	GBR; Ret	GER; Ret	AUT; Ret	NED; Ret	ITA	BEL	EUR	RSA	AUS	17th	3
1986	Minardi Team	Minardi M185B	Motori Moderni Tipo 615-90 1.5 V6t	BRA; Ret	ESP; Ret	SMR; Ret	MON; DNQ	BEL; Ret	CAN; Ret	DET; Ret	FRA; Ret	GBR; Ret	GER; Ret		AUT; Ret					NC	0
1986	Minardi Team	Minardi M186	Motori Moderni Tipo 615-90 1.5 V6t											HUN; Ret		ITA; Ret	POR; Ret	MEX; 8	AUS; Ret	NC	0
1987	Brabham	Brabham BT56	BMW M12/13 1.5 L4t	BRA; Ret	SMR; Ret	BEL; 3^{†}	MON; Ret	DET; Ret	FRA; Ret	GBR; Ret	GER; Ret	HUN; Ret	AUT; Ret	ITA; Ret	POR; Ret	ESP; Ret	MEX; Ret	JPN; Ret	AUS; 8^{†}	14th	4
1988	Rial Racing	Rial ARC1	Ford Cosworth DFZ 3.5 V8	BRA; Ret	SMR; Ret	MON; Ret	MEX; Ret	CAN; 9^{†}	DET; 4	FRA; 10	GBR; Ret	GER; 13	HUN; Ret	BEL; Ret	ITA; Ret	POR; Ret	ESP; Ret	JPN; Ret	AUS; 8^{†}	15th	3
1989	BMS Scuderia Italia	Dallara F189	Ford Cosworth DFR 3.5 V8	BRA; 13	SMR; 10	MON; 13	MEX; Ret	USA; Ret	CAN; 3	FRA; DNQ	GBR; Ret	GER; 7	HUN; Ret	BEL; 11	ITA; Ret	POR; Ret	ESP; 7	JPN; 10	AUS; Ret	16th	4
1990	BMS Scuderia Italia	Dallara F190	Ford Cosworth DFR 3.5 V8	USA; Ret	BRA; Ret	SMR; Ret	MON; Ret	CAN; Ret	MEX; 13	FRA; DSQ	GBR; Ret	GER; DNQ	HUN; Ret	BEL; Ret	ITA; 10	POR; Ret	ESP; Ret	JPN; Ret	AUS; Ret	NC	0
1991	Team 7UP Jordan	Jordan 191	Ford HBA4 3.5 V8	USA; DNPQ	BRA; Ret	SMR; Ret	MON; Ret	CAN; 4	MEX; 4	FRA; 6	GBR; Ret	GER; 5	HUN; 7	BEL; 13^{†}	ITA; 7	POR; 8	ESP; Ret	JPN; Ret	AUS; 8	9th	9
1992	Tyrrell	Tyrrell 020B	Ilmor 2175A 3.5 V10	RSA; Ret	MEX; 5	BRA; Ret	ESP; Ret	SMR; 14^{†}	MON; Ret	CAN; 5	FRA; Ret	GBR; Ret	GER; Ret	HUN; 8	BEL; 8	ITA; 6	POR; 9	JPN; 4	AUS; Ret	9th	8
1993	Tyrrell	Tyrrell 020C	Yamaha OX10A 3.5 V10	RSA; Ret	BRA; Ret	EUR; Ret	SMR; Ret	ESP; DSQ	MON; 10	CAN; Ret	FRA; 15									NC	0
1993	Tyrrell	Tyrrell 021	Yamaha OX10A 3.5 V10									GBR; NC	GER; Ret	HUN; 11	BEL; Ret	ITA; 13^{†}	POR; 12	JPN; Ret	AUS; 13	NC	0
1994	Sasol Jordan	Jordan 194	Hart 1035 3.5 V10	BRA	PAC	SMR; Ret	MON; 4	ESP												20th	4
1994	Broker Sauber Mercedes	Sauber C13	Mercedes 2175B 3.5 V10						CAN; Ret											20th	4
1994	Sauber Mercedes	Sauber C13	Mercedes 2175B 3.5 V10							FRA; 6	GBR; Ret	GER; Ret	HUN; Ret	BEL; Ret	ITA; Ret	POR; Ret	EUR; Ret	JPN	AUS	20th	4

^{†} Driver did not finish the Grand Prix, but was classified as he completed over 90% of the race distance.

=== Complete Grand Prix Masters results ===
(key) Races in bold indicate pole position, races in italics indicate fastest lap.

Year	Team	Chassis	Engine	1	2	3	4	5
2005	Team Unipart	Delta Motorsport GPM	Nicholson McLaren 3.5 V8	RSA; 4				
2006	Team INA	Delta Motorsport GPM	Nicholson McLaren 3.5 V8	QAT; 13	ITA; C	GBR; 10	MAL; C	RSA; C

Records
Preceded by Jacky Ickx; 23 years, 216 days (1968 German GP)	Youngest Grand Prix polesitter 22 years, 308 days (1982 United States Grand Prix West)	Succeeded by Rubens Barrichello; 22 years, 97 days (1994 Belgian GP)
