= 1991 Belgian Grand Prix =

11th round of the 1991 Formula One season

- Race 11 of 16 in the 1991 Formula One World Championship
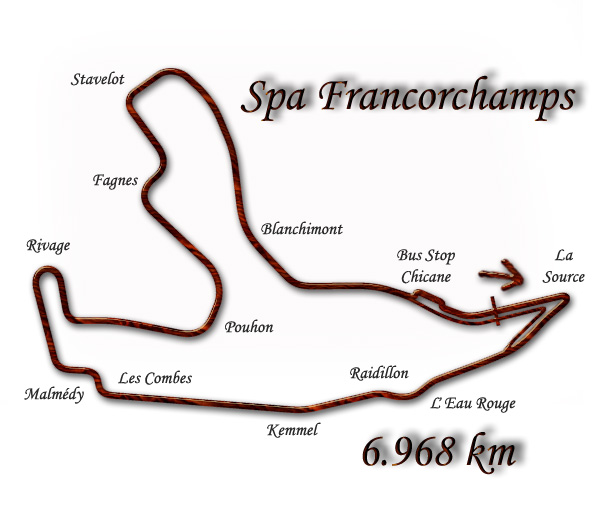

Race details
- Date: 25 August 1991
- Official name: XL Grand Prix de Belgique
- Location: Circuit de Spa-Francorchamps; Francorchamps, Wallonia, Belgium
- Course: Permanent racing facility
- Course length: 6.940 km (4.312 miles)
- Distance: 44 laps, 305.360 km (189.741 miles)
- Weather: Sunny and hot

Pole position
Driver	(Brazil) Ayrton Senna	McLaren-Honda
- Time: 1:47.811

Fastest lap
Driver	(Brazil) Roberto Moreno	Benetton-Ford
- Time: 1:55.161 on lap 40

Podium
First	(Brazil) Ayrton Senna	McLaren-Honda
Second	(Austria) Gerhard Berger	McLaren-Honda
Third	(Brazil) Nelson Piquet	Benetton-Ford

The 1991 Belgian Grand Prix was a Formula One motor race held at the Circuit de Spa-Francorchamps on 25 August 1991. It was the eleventh race of the 1991 Formula One World Championship. The 44-lap race was won by Brazilian Ayrton Senna, driving a McLaren-Honda, after he started from pole position. His Austrian teammate Gerhard Berger finished second, with another Brazilian, Nelson Piquet, third in a Benetton-Ford. Senna's Drivers' Championship rival, Briton Nigel Mansell, retired with an electrical failure, allowing Senna to extend his lead over him to 22 points with five races remaining.

The race marked the debut of future seven-time World Champion, German Michael Schumacher, driving a Jordan-Ford. Schumacher qualified seventh, which matched the team's season-best grid position, and Schumacher outqualified veteran Andrea de Cesaris. Although he retired on the opening lap with a clutch failure, Schumacher's debut impressed the paddock. His seventh place qualifying was done in a midfield car, the Jordan 191, which he drove half a day of testing and at a track he had never raced at.

== Pre-race ==
The Jordan team dominated the headlines leading up to the Belgian Grand Prix. Driver Bertrand Gachot was serving an eighteen-month prison sentence in an English jail (from which he would ultimately be released after just two months) as a result of an altercation with a London taxi driver, so the team had decided to replace him with young German driver Michael Schumacher. Elsewhere, Johnny Herbert had returned to Lotus after having missed the previous two races due to Formula 3000 commitments in Japan.

== Qualifying ==
=== Pre-qualifying report ===
As at the previous event in Hungary, the Friday morning pre-qualifying session was dominated by Brabham, who achieved their second 1–2 in succession. On this occasion, Martin Brundle was fastest, 1.5 seconds quicker than his team-mate Mark Blundell. Third, over 3.5 seconds slower than Brundle, was Olivier Grouillard for Fondmetal, the fourth time this season he had pre-qualified. Over a second behind Grouillard was Alex Caffi, pre-qualifying for the first time in three attempts for Footwork.

Missing out by 0.45 of a second in fifth place was Caffi's team-mate Michele Alboreto, the first time he had failed to pre-qualify in his three attempts. A fraction slower in sixth, after suffering a huge accident, was Gabriele Tarquini in the AGS, nearly two seconds ahead of Pedro Chaves in the Coloni. Bottom of the time sheets was the other AGS of Fabrizio Barbazza, who also crashed during the session.

=== Pre-qualifying classification ===
Pos	No	Driver	Constructor	Time	Gap
1	7	(United Kingdom) Martin Brundle	Brabham-Yamaha	1:54.929	—
2	8	(United Kingdom) Mark Blundell	Brabham-Yamaha	1:56.446	+1.517
3	14	(France) Olivier Grouillard	Fondmetal-Ford	1:58.447	+3.518
4	10	(Italy) Alex Caffi	Footwork-Ford	1:59.460	+4.531
5	9	(Italy) Michele Alboreto	Footwork-Ford	1:59.910	+4.981
6	17	(Italy) Gabriele Tarquini	AGS-Ford	1:59.972	+5.043
7	31	(Portugal) Pedro Chaves	Coloni-Ford	2:01.921	+6.992
8	18	(Italy) Fabrizio Barbazza	AGS-Ford	1:22:46.766	+1:00.00

=== Qualifying report ===
Ayrton Senna was fastest most of the weekend and duly took pole position, but Ferrari were right on his heels. Alain Prost qualified third on the road while Jean Alesi had set the fastest first and second sectors only to come across traffic at the end of the lap, resulting in a sixth place start, which would be elevated to fifth. Riccardo Patrese had originally qualified second, but after Saturday qualifying his car was found to not have a reverse gear as per the safety regulations and Patrese's Saturday times were wiped out, he had to start a disappointing seventeenth on the grid. Patrese's misfortune promoted Prost to second, with Nigel Mansell third, Gerhard Berger fourth, Alesi fifth, and Nelson Piquet sixth while the sensation of qualifying, Schumacher, was an amazing seventh for his first Grand Prix. The top ten was completed by Roberto Moreno in the second Benetton, Pierluigi Martini in a Minardi and the ever-impressive Stefano Modena in a Tyrrell.

=== Qualifying classification ===
Pos	No	Driver	Constructor	Q1	Q2	Gap
1	1	(Brazil) Ayrton Senna	McLaren-Honda	1:49.100	1:47.811	—
2	27	(France) Alain Prost	Ferrari	1:51.369	1:48.821	+1.010
3	5	(United Kingdom) Nigel Mansell	Williams-Renault	1:50.666	1:48.828	+1.017
4	2	(Austria) Gerhard Berger	McLaren-Honda	1:49.485	2:29.200	+1.674
5	28	(France) Jean Alesi	Ferrari	1:51.832	1:49.974	+2.163
6	20	(Brazil) Nelson Piquet	Benetton-Ford	1:53.371	1:50.540	+2.729
7	32	(Germany) Michael Schumacher	Jordan-Ford	1:53.290	1:51.212	+3.401
8	19	(Brazil) Roberto Moreno	Benetton-Ford	1:53.664	1:51.283	+3.472
9	23	(Italy) Pierluigi Martini	Minardi-Ferrari	1:53.460	1:51.299	+3.488
10	4	(Italy) Stefano Modena	Tyrrell-Honda	1:52.899	1:51.307	+3.496
11	33	(Italy) Andrea de Cesaris	Jordan-Ford	1:54.186	1:51.986	+4.175
12	16	(Italy) Ivan Capelli	Leyton House-Ilmor	1:53.603	1:52.113	+4.302
13	8	(United Kingdom) Mark Blundell	Brabham-Yamaha	1:54.814	1:52.377	+4.566
14	22	(Finland) JJ Lehto	Dallara-Judd	1:54.211	1:52.417	+4.606
15	15	(Brazil) Maurício Gugelmin	Leyton House-Ilmor	1:56.027	1:52.623	+4.812
16	7	(United Kingdom) Martin Brundle	Brabham-Yamaha	1:54.921	1:52.626	+4.815
17	6	(Italy) Riccardo Patrese	Williams-Renault	1:52.646	no time	+4.835
18	25	(Belgium) Thierry Boutsen	Ligier-Lamborghini	1:54.446	1:52.709	+4.898
19	24	(Italy) Gianni Morbidelli	Minardi-Ferrari	1:57.232	1:52.896	+5.085
20	29	(France) Éric Bernard	Lola-Ford	1:55.679	1:53.309	+5.498
21	12	(United Kingdom) Johnny Herbert	Lotus-Judd	1:55.523	1:53.361	+5.550
22	3	(Japan) Satoru Nakajima	Tyrrell-Honda	1:55.874	1:53.494	+5.683
23	14	(France) Olivier Grouillard	Fondmetal-Ford	1:55.945	1:53.628	+5.817
24	11	(Finland) Mika Häkkinen	Lotus-Judd	1:55.483	1:53.799	+5.988
25	21	(Italy) Emanuele Pirro	Dallara-Judd	1:56.131	1:53.839	+6.028
26	26	(France) Érik Comas	Ligier-Lamborghini	1:56.218	1:53.847	+6.036
27	30	(Japan) Aguri Suzuki	Lola-Ford	1:56.594	1:53.869	+6.058
28	34	(Italy) Nicola Larini	Lambo-Lamborghini	1:56.561	1:54.781	+6.970
29	10	(Italy) Alex Caffi	Footwork-Ford	1:57.556	1:57.338	+9.527
30	35	(Belgium) Eric van de Poele	Lambo-Lamborghini	35:03.624	1:57.746	+9.935

== Race ==
=== Race report ===
At the start both Senna and Prost got away well and the Brazilian led into the first corner. Mansell was third followed by Berger, Piquet, and Schumacher. The German's luck however would run dry just after Eau Rouge when his clutch failed. Out at the front Senna continued to lead but Prost's day ended on lap three when his Ferrari caught on fire, leaving Mansell in second. The determined Englishman proceeded to go after Senna and the two battled lap after lap until Senna pitted for new tyres on lap 15. The stop was a bad one and when Mansell pitted two laps later he was able to emerge ahead of Senna, but just behind Berger who had yet to stop. These stops left Piquet in the lead for one lap before he made his stop.

Mansell quickly closed in on Berger and managed to sweep past into Les Fagnes. When Berger stopped a lap later he had problems and then spun on the pit exit and came back right in front of Modena, nearly causing a bad accident. Mansell's big lead would not last, however as on lap 22 his car stopped, having succumbed to electronic problems, his championship hopes taking a major hit.

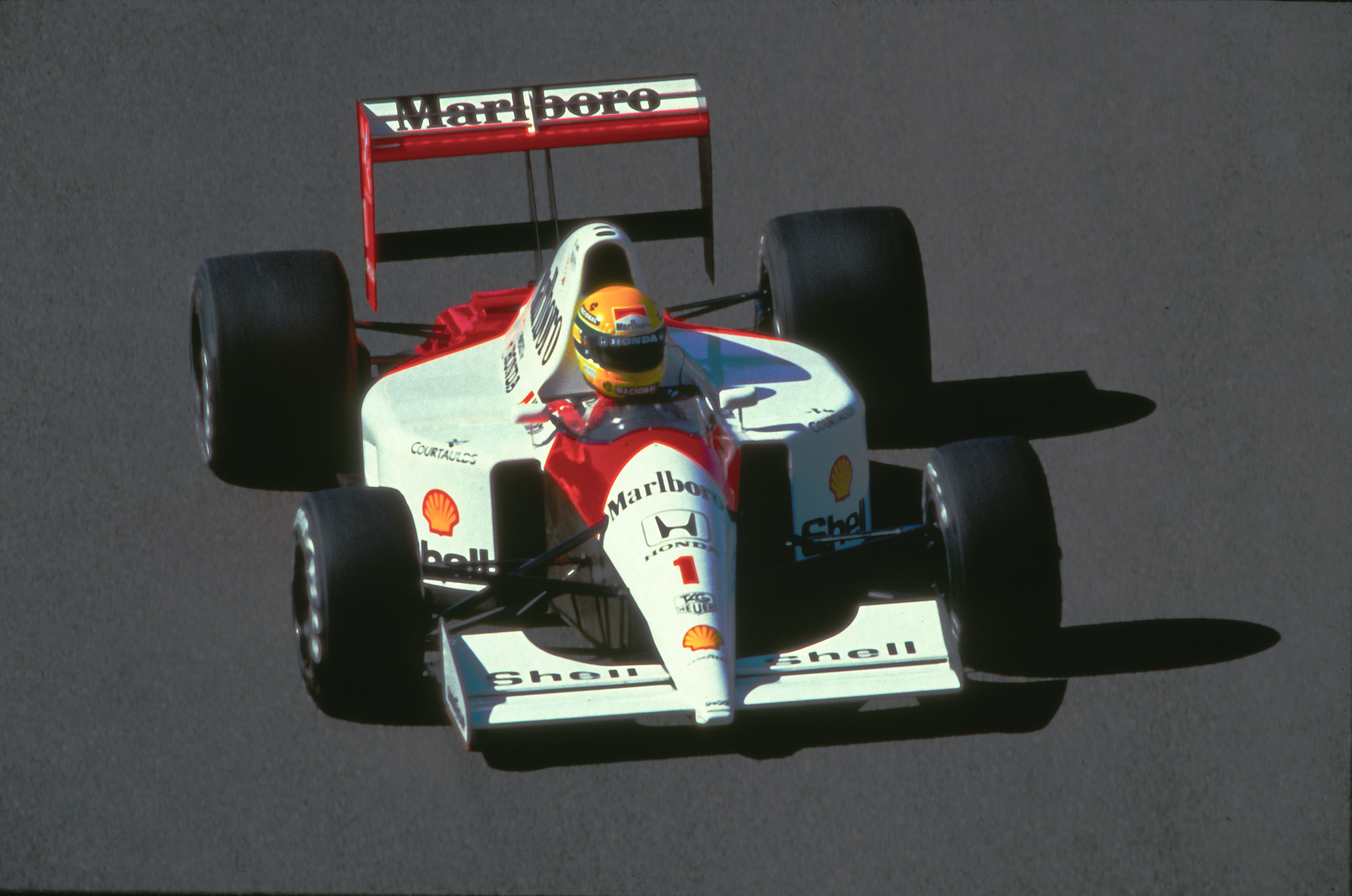
Ayrton Senna during the race in Spa-Francorchamps on 25 August 1991

Mansell's misery was Alesi's jubilation as the young Frenchman took the lead with Senna closing. Senna continued to close until he had a small problem and lost ten seconds, putting him into the clutches of Piquet's Benetton. The Piquet-Senna battle was soon joined by Patrese and de Cesaris, who had been battling over fourth. Senna led the quartet, but could not pull away because he was suffering from gearbox problems. Alesi had planned to do the entire race without stopping and his strategy was looking very good until lap 30 when his engine expired. This left Senna ahead of Piquet, de Cesaris, and Patrese, who had gone off the track trying to pass Piquet.

On Lap 31 de Cesaris managed to out brake Piquet into Les Combes and was looking good for Jordan's first podium finish in second place. Meanwhile, Patrese got past Piquet as well and set off after the Jordan. In the late stages Berger got past Piquet and then moved into third when Patrese started to suffer from gearbox problems. De Cesaris's fairy tale run ended just three laps from the end when his engine blew, promoting Berger to second and Piquet to third; it was triple World Champion Piquet's final podium of his career. Up front Senna limped home to his second consecutive win despite serious gearbox issues. Moreno was fourth, followed by Patrese and Mark Blundell, who scored Brabham's first point of the year (also the team's best result since Stefano Modena finished fifth in a Judd powered BT58 in the 1990 United States Grand Prix). The Fondmetal team and its driver Olivier Grouillard scored their first finish of 1991.

=== Race classification ===
Pos	No	Driver	Constructor	Tyre	Laps	Time/Retired	Grid	Points
1	1	(Brazil) Ayrton Senna	McLaren-Honda	G	44	1:27:17.669	1	10
2	2	(Austria) Gerhard Berger	McLaren-Honda	G	44	+1.901	4	6
3	20	(Brazil) Nelson Piquet	Benetton-Ford	P	44	+32.176	6	4
4	19	(Brazil) Roberto Moreno	Benetton-Ford	P	44	+37.310	8	3
5	6	(Italy) Riccardo Patrese	Williams-Renault	G	44	+57.187	17	2
6	8	(United Kingdom) Mark Blundell	Brabham-Yamaha	P	44	+1:40.035	13	1
7	12	(United Kingdom) Johnny Herbert	Lotus-Judd	G	44	+1:44.599	21	
8	21	(Italy) Emanuele Pirro	Dallara-Judd	P	43	+1 lap	25	
9	7	(United Kingdom) Martin Brundle	Brabham-Yamaha	P	43	+1 lap	16	
10	14	(France) Olivier Grouillard	Fondmetal-Ford	G	43	+1 lap	23	
11	25	(Belgium) Thierry Boutsen	Ligier-Lamborghini	G	43	+1 lap	18	
12	23	(Italy) Pierluigi Martini	Minardi-Ferrari	G	42	Gearbox	9	
13	33	(Italy) Andrea de Cesaris	Jordan-Ford	G	41	Engine	11	
Ret	4	(Italy) Stefano Modena	Tyrrell-Honda	P	33	Oil leak	10	
Ret	22	(Finland) JJ Lehto	Dallara-Judd	P	33	Oil pressure	14	
Ret	28	(France) Jean Alesi	Ferrari	G	30	Engine	5	
Ret	24	(Italy) Gianni Morbidelli	Minardi-Ferrari	G	29	Gearbox	19	
Ret	11	(Finland) Mika Häkkinen	Lotus-Judd	G	25	Engine/Spun off	24	
Ret	26	(France) Érik Comas	Ligier-Lamborghini	G	25	Engine	26	
Ret	5	(United Kingdom) Nigel Mansell	Williams-Renault	G	22	Electrical	3	
Ret	29	(France) Éric Bernard	Lola-Ford	G	21	Gearbox	20	
Ret	16	(Italy) Ivan Capelli	Leyton House-Ilmor	G	13	Engine	12	
Ret	3	(Japan) Satoru Nakajima	Tyrrell-Honda	P	7	Spun off	22	
Ret	27	(France) Alain Prost	Ferrari	G	2	Fuel leak	2	
Ret	15	(Brazil) Maurício Gugelmin	Leyton House-Ilmor	G	1	Engine	15	
Ret	32	(Germany) Michael Schumacher	Jordan-Ford	G	0	Clutch	7	
DNQ	30	(Japan) Aguri Suzuki	Lola-Ford	G				
DNQ	34	(Italy) Nicola Larini	Lambo-Lamborghini	G				
DNQ	10	(Italy) Alex Caffi	Footwork-Ford	G				
DNQ	35	(Belgium) Eric van de Poele	Lambo-Lamborghini	G				
DNPQ	9	(Italy) Michele Alboreto	Footwork-Ford	G				
DNPQ	17	(Italy) Gabriele Tarquini	AGS-Ford	G				
DNPQ	31	(Portugal) Pedro Chaves	Coloni-Ford	G				
DNPQ	18	(Italy) Fabrizio Barbazza	AGS-Ford	G				

== Championship standings after the race ==
Drivers' Championship standings

	Pos	Driver	Points
	1	(Brazil) **Ayrton Senna***	71
	2	(United Kingdom) **Nigel Mansell***	49
	3	(Italy) **Riccardo Patrese***	34
	4	(Austria) **Gerhard Berger***	28
1	5	(Brazil) **Nelson Piquet***	22

Constructors' Championship standings

Pos	Constructor	Points
1	(United Kingdom) **McLaren-Honda***	99
2	(United Kingdom) **Williams-Renault***	83
3	(Italy) **Ferrari***	35
4	(United Kingdom) **Benetton-Ford***	30
5	(Republic of Ireland) Jordan-Ford	13

- Note: Only the top five positions are included for both sets of standings.
- Competitors in bold and marked with an asterisk still had a mathematical chance of becoming World Champion.

Previous race: 1991 Hungarian Grand Prix	FIA Formula One World Championship; 1991 season	Next race: 1991 Italian Grand Prix
Previous race: 1990 Belgian Grand Prix	Belgian Grand Prix	Next race: 1992 Belgian Grand Prix
