= Brabham BT60 =

Formula One racing car

Brabham BT60Y Brabham BT60B
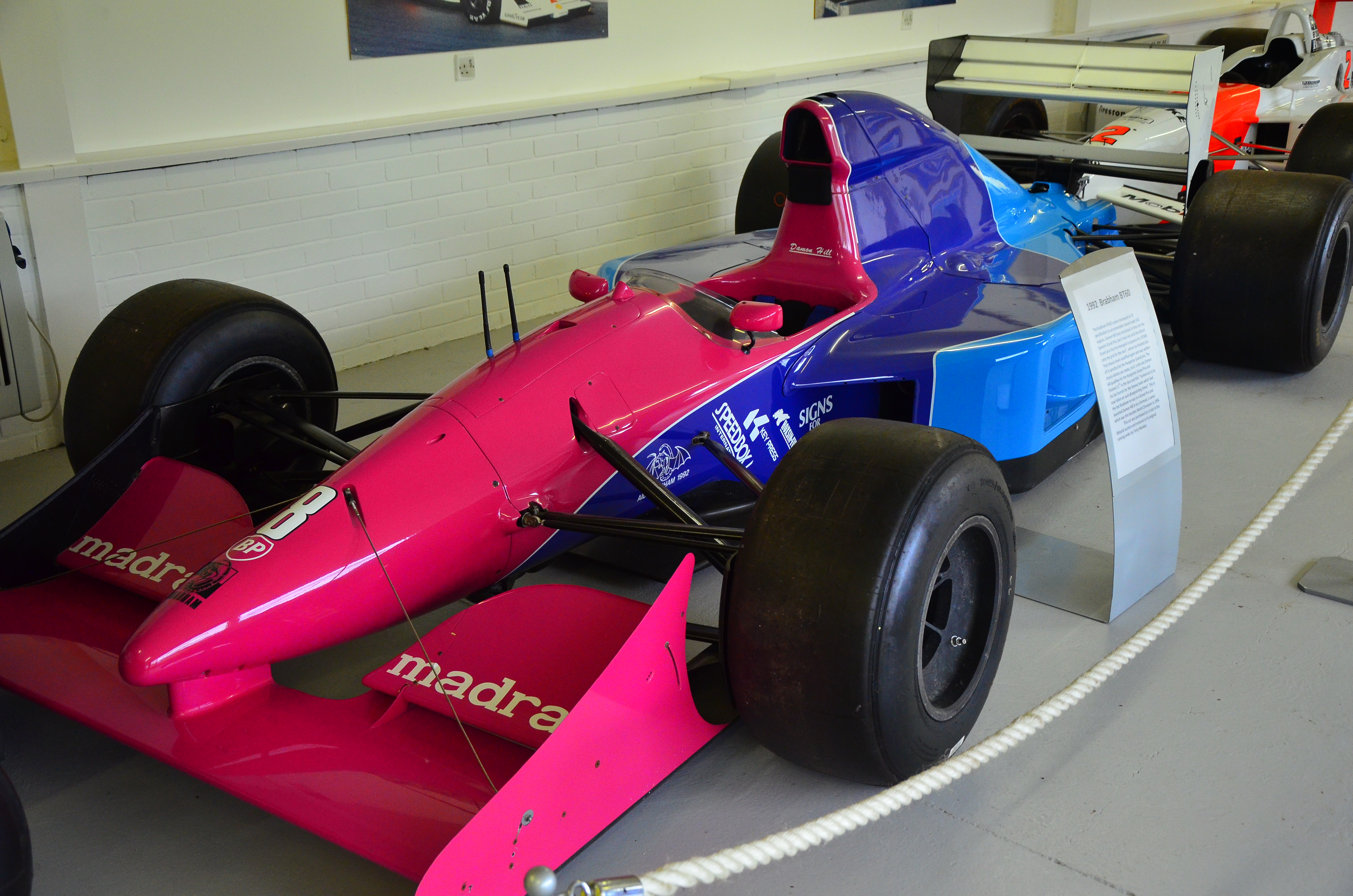
- Damon Hill's 1992-specification Brabham BT60B
- Category: Formula One
- Constructor: Brabham
- Designers: Sergio Rinland (Technical Director); Tim Densham (Chief Designer); Hans Fouche (Head of Aerodynamics)
- Predecessor: BT59Y

Technical specifications
- Chassis: Carbon fibre monocoque
- Suspension (front): Double wishbones, pushrods
- Suspension (rear): Double wishbones, pushrods
- Engine: 1991: Yamaha OX99, 3,498 cc (213.5 cu in), 70° V12, NA, mid-engine, longitudinally mounted 1992: Judd GV, 3,498 cc (213.5 cu in), 72° V10, NA, mid-engine, longitudinally mounted
- Transmission: Brabham / Hewland transverse 6-speed semi-automatic
- Fuel: BP
- Tyres: 1991: Pirelli; 1992: Goodyear

Competition history
- Notable entrants: Motor Racing Developments Ltd.
- Notable drivers: 7. (United Kingdom) Martin Brundle; 7. (Belgium) Eric van de Poele; 8. (United Kingdom) Mark Blundell; 8. (Italy) Giovanna Amati; 8. (United Kingdom) Damon Hill
- Debut: 1991 San Marino Grand Prix
Races	Wins	Poles	F/Laps
25	0	0	0
- Constructors' Championships: 0
- Drivers' Championships: 0

The Brabham BT60 was the final series of Formula One racing cars built for the Brabham Formula One motor racing team. Designed by Sergio Rinland, they raced in the 1991 and 1992 Formula One World Championships. The car brought to a close Brabham's 30 years of construction of purpose-built racing cars, which began with Jack Brabham and Ron Tauranac and the Brabham BT1 Formula Junior design in 1961.

== BT60Y ==
The first car, the BT60Y, was powered by the Yamaha OX99 V12 engine. It was driven by Martin Brundle, who was returning to Brabham and Formula One again after driving for Jaguar in the 1990 World Sportscar Championship. The team's second car was driven by Formula One rookie Mark Blundell.

Brabham only scored three points in 1991, with one 5th-place for Brundle, and Blundell scoring one 6th-place finish. The team finished 10th in the Constructors' Championship.

== BT60B ==
For the 1992 Formula One season the team used a modified version of the car, dubbed the BT60B, which was powered by the Judd GV V10 engine. The cars were driven by Eric van de Poele from Belgium and Italian rookie Giovanna Amati. Part way through the year Amati was replaced by another Formula One rookie, future World Drivers' Champion Damon Hill. The BT60B was the last Formula One car produced by Brabham.

The 1992 season was a complete disaster for the once great Brabham team. After van de Poele qualified 26th and last and finished 13th (again last) at the opening race in South Africa, neither car qualified for a race until round nine, the 1992 British Grand Prix, where Hill qualified 26th.

Two races later the team had its last race meeting in Formula One, at the Hungarian Grand Prix, where Hill gave the team its highest finish of the season finishing 11th, some four laps down on race winner Ayrton Senna.

== BT61 ==
Brabham fell into administration and attempts were made by RM Motorsports to buy the team. During this time, the company engaged Galmer Engineering to build a successor for the BT60B. The BT61 would have competed in the 1993 season, but development of the car was never completed after RM Motorsport failed to name what engine would be used or pay Galmer Engineering for their work. The company never completed the purchase of the team and the team was eventually liquidated.

== Complete Formula One results ==
(key)

Year	Entrant	Chassis	Engine	Tyres	Drivers	1	2	3	4	5	6	7	8	9	10	11	12	13	14	15	16	Points	WCC
1991	Motor Racing Developments	BT60Y	Yamaha OX99; V12	G		USA	BRA	SMR	MON	CAN	MEX	FRA	GBR	GER	HUN	BEL	ITA	POR	ESP	JPN	AUS	3	10th
1991	Motor Racing Developments	BT60Y	Yamaha OX99; V12	G	Martin Brundle			11	DSQ	Ret	Ret	Ret	Ret	11	Ret	9	13	12	10	5	DNQ	3	10th
1991	Motor Racing Developments	BT60Y	Yamaha OX99; V12	G	Mark Blundell			8	Ret	DNQ	Ret	Ret	Ret	12	Ret	6	12	Ret	Ret	DNPQ	17	3	10th
1992	Motor Racing Developments	BT60B	Judd GV; V10	G		RSA	MEX	BRA	ESP	SMR	MON	CAN	FRA	GBR	GER	HUN	BEL	ITA	POR	JPN	AUS	0	NC
1992	Motor Racing Developments	BT60B	Judd GV; V10	G	Eric van de Poele	13	DNQ	DNQ	DNQ	DNQ	DNQ	DNQ	DNQ	DNQ	DNQ							0	NC
1992	Motor Racing Developments	BT60B	Judd GV; V10	G	Giovanna Amati	DNQ	DNQ	DNQ														0	NC
1992	Motor Racing Developments	BT60B	Judd GV; V10	G	Damon Hill				DNQ	DNQ	DNQ	DNQ	DNQ	16	DNQ	11						0	NC
