= Fondmetal GR02 =

- Category: Formula One
- Constructor: Fondmetal
- Designers: Sergio Rinland (Technical Director); Hans Fouche (Head of Aerodynamics)
- Predecessor: Fondmetal GR01

Technical specifications
- Chassis: carbon fibre monocoque
- Suspension (front): KONI dampers with pushrods
- Suspension (rear): KONI dampers with pushrods
- Axle track: 1,800 mm (70.9 in)/1,680 mm (66.1 in) front/rear
- Wheelbase: 2,875 mm (113.2 in)
- Engine: Ford HBA5 3,498 cc (213.5 cu in) V8, naturally-aspirated mid-engined
- Transmission: Xtrac 6-speed
- Power: 660 hp @ 12,000 rpm
- Fuel: Agip
- Tyres: Goodyear

Competition history
- Notable entrants: Fondmetal
- Notable drivers: 14. (Switzerland) Andrea Chiesa; 14. (Belgium) Eric van de Poele; 15. (Italy) Gabriele Tarquini
- Debut: 1992 Canadian Grand Prix
Entries	Races	Wins	Poles	F/Laps
7	7	0	0	0

The Fondmetal GR02 was a Formula One racing car designed by Sergio Rinland and his Astauto studio for the 1992 Formula One season. Built to replace the Fondmetal GR01, as Fondmetal's team boss Gabriele Rumi had never been impressed by that car or its predecessor, the Fomet-1, the GR02 used the same 3.5-litre Ford HBA5 V8 engine as its predecessor. Gabriele Tarquini gave the GR02 its début at the 1992 Canadian Grand Prix, whilst team mate Andrea Chiesa first drove it in the following 1992 French Grand Prix. Although the GR02 showed promise, and drew praise from the media, Fondmetal's financial difficulties meant that they withdrew from Formula One after the 1992 Italian Grand Prix.

== Design and development ==
Unconvinced by the performance of the Fondmetal Fomet-1 during the 1991 Formula One season, Fondmetal's boss Gabriele Rumi ended his association with that car's designers. After initially negotiating with Tom Walkinshaw Racing, Rumi eventually gave the contract to Sergio Rinland's Astauto studio; Rinland had previously worked on the Brabham BT60, and the GR02 project was Astauto's first. However, this change came too late for a new car to be ready for the start of the 1992 Formula One season and the Fomet-1 was duly updated into the GR01. Both the GR01 and GR02, however, were to ditch the old Cosworth DFR V8 engine found in the Fomet-1 and replace it with a Ford HBA5 V8 instead, resulting in a useful power increase of over 100 hp (101 PS; 75 kW). Development on the GR02 began at the start of 1992, and the first prototype ran at Ferrari's Fiorano test track in May 1992. The GR02 had simpler mechanical components than the BT60 had, with a Xtrac gearbox and twin shock absorbers both front and rear. The aerodynamics, however, were less conventional; it featured a chiselled nosecone, and an anhedral front wing assembly, with the latter being designed to channel air around the floor and diffuser. The GR02 was first ready to race at the 1992 Canadian Grand Prix and soon drew praise from the press; Autosport stated that the car was "a huge step forward for a team which was once the joke of the F1 paddock", whilst BBC's commentator Murray Walker stated that it was an "Excellent car, very good looking car, good performance but still a lot of development to do." However, the car was insufficiently tested, and, although it showed good pace, it was plagued by reliability issues. After Fondmetal folded, it was rumoured that the GR02 had been redeveloped for Forti Corse into their FG01 effort in 1995.

== Racing history ==
By the 1992 Canadian Grand Prix, the GR02 was finally ready to be raced. Gabriele Tarquini was selected to drive the new car, but reliability issues plagued him throughout the weekend (although he did manage to qualify 18th), and his gearbox packed up on the very first lap. A second GR02 was ready for the following race, which was the 1992 French Grand Prix; however, Fondmetal's second driver, Andrea Chiesa, was lucky to escape unharmed after he badly damaged his car in a first-corner collision with the Jordan of Maurício Gugelmin, on his first start. Tarquini, meanwhile, managed to avoid the melee, which also wiped out several other cars and ran as high as 14th before his throttle cable snapped after six laps. Whilst Chiesa was forced to drive a GR01 at the 1992 British Grand Prix as there were no spare GR02 chassis, Tarquini qualified a promising 15th and finished the race in 14th place, a lap ahead of Pierluigi Martini in 15th and two ahead of Damon Hill in 16th. In the process, Tarquini had actually set the eighth fastest lap in the race, a lap that was both quicker than Ivan Capelli of Ferrari (whom Tarquini had also been just 0.2 seconds behind in qualifying) and Mika Häkkinen of Lotus. Tarquini followed this by qualifying 19th at the 1992 German Grand Prix, and was running in the top ten when engine failure forced him to retire on lap 33. For the 1992 Hungarian Grand Prix, there was a new driver in the second GR02; Eric van de Poele replaced Chiesa, after Rumi had lost patience with the Swiss driver. Although neither driver had any issue qualifying for the race and Tarquini qualified an impressive 12th, Tarquini was wiped out in a first-lap accident and van de Poele's race ended on lap three after he spun out. By now, however, the crashes and unreliability of the GR02 were beginning to place a heavy strain on Fondmetal's finances and the team had very few spare parts for the 1992 Belgian Grand Prix. Despite this, both Fondmetal drivers managed to qualify in the top 15, with Tarquini qualifying in eleventh; although his engine expired after 25 laps, van de Poele managed to finish tenth, ahead of both March entries, both Jordans, the Minardi of Gianni Morbidelli, and the Larrousse of Ukyo Katayama, all of whom were still running when the chequered flag fell. This, however, was not to prove a saving grace for the team, who were now so tight on funds that they could only complete a limited amount of running in practice for the 1992 Italian Grand Prix, their home race. Tarquini qualified 20th, and van de Poele 25th; however, van de Poele didn't even make the first corner before his clutch failed, whilst Tarquini completed 30 laps before succumbing to gearbox failure. The financial crisis meant that Rumi nearly hired Giuseppe Bugatti as a pay-driver just to get through the 1992 Portuguese Grand Prix, but he instead pulled the plug on his team due to the mounting debt.

== Complete Formula One results ==
(key) (results in bold indicate pole position, results in italics indicate fastest lap)

Year	Entrant	Engine	Tyres	Drivers	1	2	3	4	5	6	7	8	9	10	11	12	13	14	15	16	Pts.	WCC
1992	Fondmetal F1 SpA	Ford HBA5; V8	**G**		RSA	MEX	BRA	ESP	SMR	MON	CAN	FRA	GBR	GER	HUN	BEL	ITA	POR	JPN	AUS	**0**	**NC**
1992	Fondmetal F1 SpA	Ford HBA5; V8	**G**	Andrea Chiesa								Ret		DNQ							**0**	**NC**
1992	Fondmetal F1 SpA	Ford HBA5; V8	**G**	Eric van de Poele											Ret	10	Ret				**0**	**NC**
1992	Fondmetal F1 SpA	Ford HBA5; V8	**G**	Gabriele Tarquini							Ret	Ret	14	Ret	Ret	Ret	Ret				**0**	**NC**
