= Perry McCarthy =

British racing driver (born 1961)

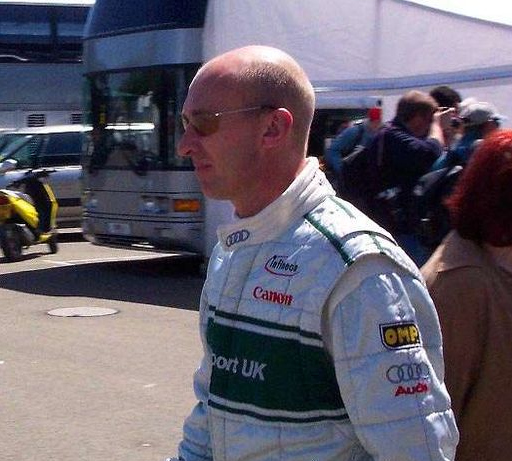
- McCarthy in 2003
- Born: Perry Edward McCarthy; 3 March 1961 (age 65); Stepney, East London, England

Formula One World Championship career
- Nationality: (United Kingdom) British
- Active years: 1992
- Team: Andrea Moda
- Entries: 10 (0 starts)
- Championships: 0
- Wins: 0
- Podiums: 0
- Career points: 0
- Pole positions: 0
- Fastest laps: 0
- First entry: 1992 Brazilian Grand Prix
- Last entry: 1992 Italian Grand Prix

Championship titles
- 1983: British Formula Ford 1600 Championship

Perry Edward McCarthy (born 3 March 1961) is a British racing driver, who drove for the Andrea Moda team in Formula One in 1992, though never making it into a race, before moving into sportscars, including driving in the 24 Hours of Le Mans five times between 1996 and 2003.

McCarthy also portrayed The Stig in the first two series of the revamped version of BBC motoring show Top Gear.

== Career ==
Born in Stepney, East London, McCarthy grew up to work for his father's company servicing North Sea oil rigs. Unlike most Formula One drivers, McCarthy did not start racing in karts. He worked his way through the junior categories of motor sport in Europe, such as Formula Ford, Formula 3, eventually F3000 and various touring and sports car races in the US, including drives for Spice Engineering.

In 1991, McCarthy was chosen to test for the Footwork Formula One team. Although he impressed the team, his break did not come until the eve of the 1992 Formula One season, when he was signed by the independent Andrea Moda team run by Andrea Sassetti who thought that entering Formula One would be a good way to advertise his shoe business. The team was uncompetitive, disorganized and poorly managed, and after a lengthy battle to gain a FIA Super Licence the season soon descended into farce. Because Sassetti was unable to release McCarthy for Enrico Bertaggia, who had left the team before and attempted to return with the promise of extra funding, McCarthy received unfair treatment from the owner, being frequently denied more than a handful of laps in which to prepare, which led to his failure to qualify for any Grand Prix, and sometimes his car was used as a spare car for teammate Roberto Moreno. His Grand Prix debut in Spain lasted eighteen metres down the pit lane in pre-qualifying before the engine failed. In the British Grand Prix, he was sent out with wet tyres on a dry track. For the Hungarian Grand Prix, he was only allowed to leave the pits 45 seconds before the end of the pre-qualifying session, which made it impossible for him to set a lap time even if he had a faster car. Finally, in the Belgian Grand Prix, Andrea Moda's final entry, McCarthy was sent out for the qualifying session with a broken steering part in his car, which had been extracted from teammate Roberto Moreno's car, which would have led to a violent crash at the Raidillon curve had McCarthy not managed to regain control of the car. The team was expelled from the championship close to the end of the season in controversial circumstances and McCarthy was left without a drive. In a July 2004 interview with The Times, McCarthy discussed how this period in his career had contributed to his being dubbed the world's unluckiest racing driver, saying "Dick Dastardly had more luck than me".

McCarthy did not race in Formula One after 1992, but tested for both Williams and Benetton teams during the 1990s. He was denied a permanent role as test driver at Benetton because he was covering for their normal test driver, Alessandro Zanardi, who was unwell. He had little success at Williams because he did not see eye to eye with the engineers and the position was then given to David Coulthard.

=== Other racing ===
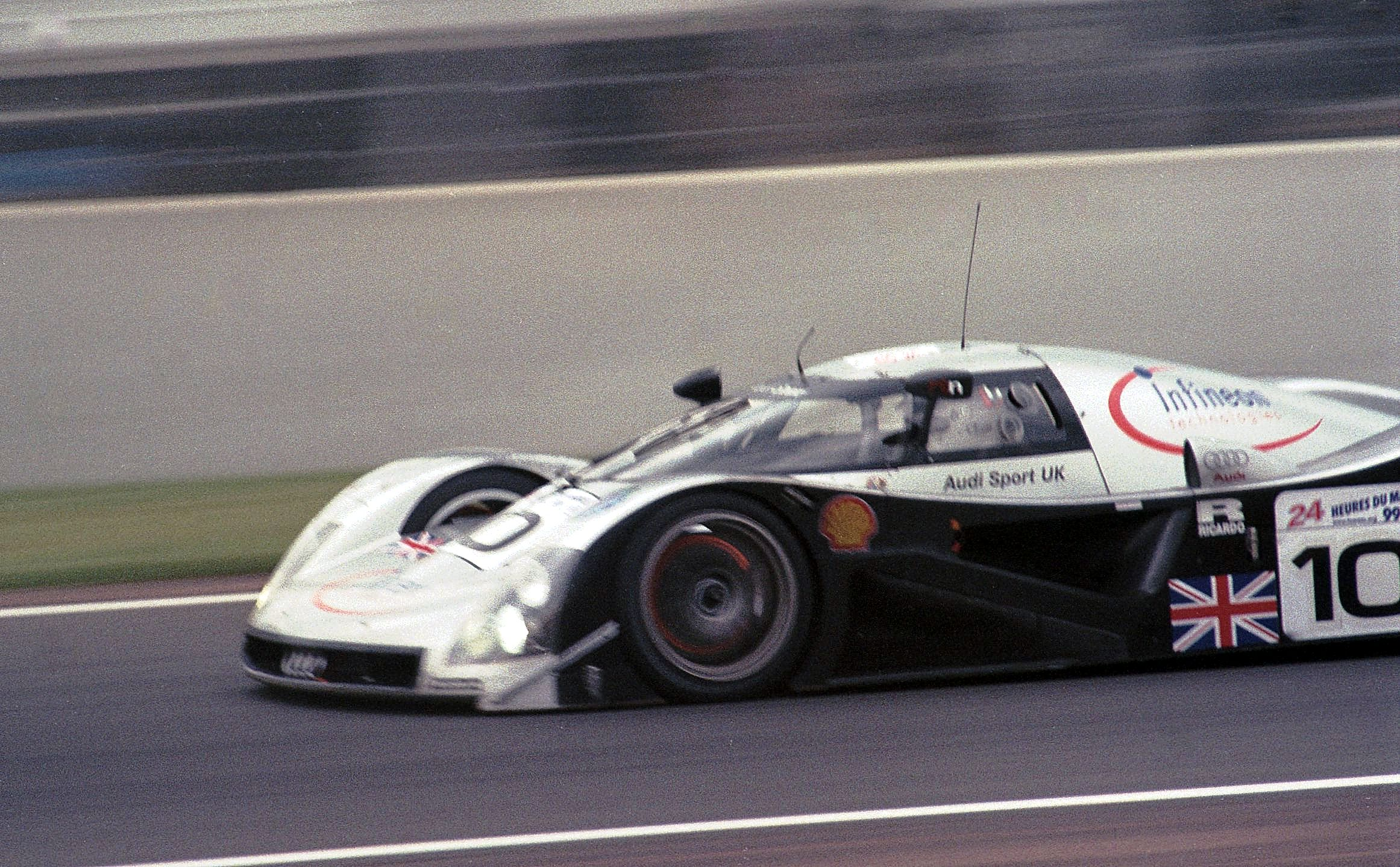
McCarthy at the 1999 24 Hours of Le Mans

In 1995, McCarthy raced in the short-lived Formula Classic series, scoring two podiums.

=== Top Gear ===
After a brief retirement, McCarthy returned to sports car racing, appearing at Le Mans in 2002 and numerous other events. In 2002, he released his autobiography entitled Flat Out, Flat Broke, in which he spoke candidly about his time in Formula One and, in the second edition, his work for the BBC's Top Gear motoring show as The Stig, a masked, anonymous, racing driver who evaluated the latest high performance cars. McCarthy was the original, black-suited Stig, who left after the first two series. He provided commentary on F1 races for the BBC in 2009. McCarthy now works as a corporate ambassador and after-dinner speaker for corporations around the world.

== Bibliography ==
In 2002, McCarthy wrote an autobiography, titled Flat Out, Flat Broke: Formula 1 the Hard Way!; it detailed his career, and the hardships he faced while trying to break into Formula One. In the second edition of this book, McCarthy revealed that he was Top Gear's The Stig.

== Racing record ==
=== Complete International Formula 3000 results ===
(key)

Year	Entrant	1	2	3	4	5	6	7	8	9	10	11	DC	Points
1988	GA Motorsports	JER	VAL	PAU	SIL	MNZ	PER	BRH	BIR; DNQ				NC	0
1988	Team Ralt									BUG; Ret	ZOL; Ret	DIJ; 16	NC	0
1989	Cowman Racing	SIL	VAL	PAU	JER	PER	BRH	BIR; DNQ	SPA; 7	BUG; 15	DIJ		NC	0

=== Complete Formula One results ===
(key)

Yr	Entrant	Chassis	Engine	1	2	3	4	5	6	7	8	9	10	11	12	13	14	15	16	WDC	Points
1992	Andrea Moda Formula	Andrea Moda S921	Judd V10	RSA	MEX	BRA; DNP	ESP; DNPQ	SMR; DNPQ	MON; DNPQ	CAN; DNP	FRA; DNA	GBR; DNPQ	GER; EX	HUN; DNPQ	BEL; DNQ	ITA; DNP	POR	JPN	AUS	NC	0

=== Complete 24 Hours of Le Mans results ===
Year	Team	Co-Drivers	Car	Class	Laps	Pos.	Class Pos.
1996	(France) Viper Team Oreca	(France) Dominique Dupuy (United Kingdom) Justin Bell	Chrysler Viper GTS-R	GT1	96	DNF	DNF
1997	(United Kingdom) David Price Racing	(Australia) David Brabham (United States) Doc Bundy	Panoz Esperante GTR-1	GT1	145	DNF	DNF
1999	(United Kingdom) Audi Sport UK Ltd.	(United Kingdom) James Weaver (United Kingdom) Andy Wallace	Audi R8C	LMGTP	198	DNF	DNF
2002	(France) DAMS	(France) Jérôme Policand (Belgium) Marc Duez	Panoz LMP-1 Roadster-S	LMP900	98	DNF	DNF
2003	(United Kingdom) Audi Sport UK (United Kingdom) Arena Motorsport	(Germany) Frank Biela (Finland) Mika Salo	Audi R8	LMP900	28	DNF	DNF

Media offices
New title	The Stig; 2002–2003	Succeeded by Ben Collins; As White Stig
