= 1992 British Grand Prix =

Coordinates: 52°4′43″N 1°1′1″W

- Race 9 of 16 in the 1992 Formula One World Championship
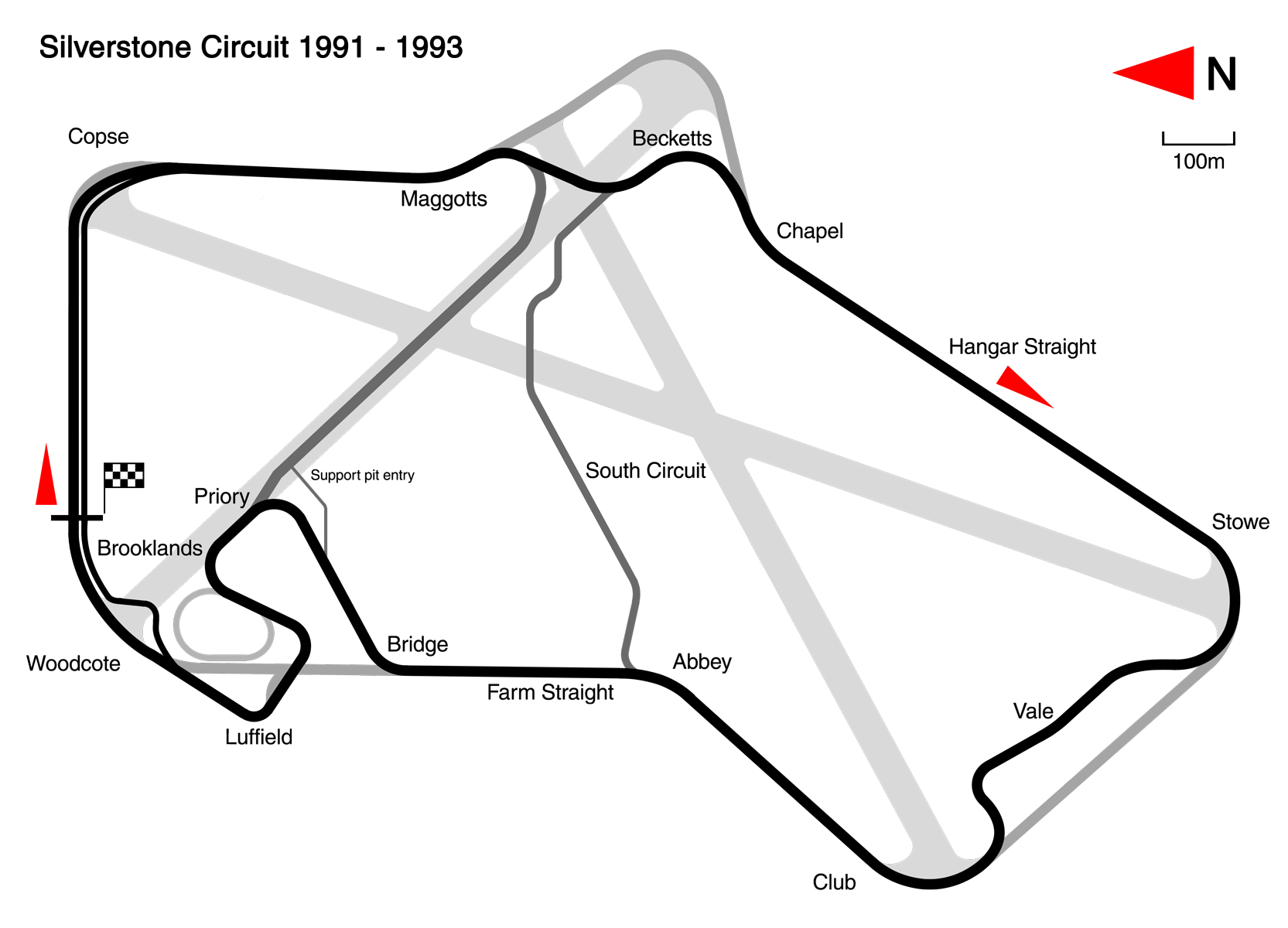

Race details
- Date: 12 July 1992
- Location: Silverstone Circuit, Silverstone, Northamptonshire, Great Britain
- Course: Permanent race track
- Course length: 5.226 km (3.260 miles)
- Distance: 59 laps, 308.334 km (192.348 miles)
- Weather: Dry

Pole position
Driver	(United Kingdom) Nigel Mansell	Williams-Renault
- Time: 1:18.965

Fastest lap
Driver	(United Kingdom) Nigel Mansell	Williams-Renault
- Time: 1:22.539 on lap 57

Podium
First	(United Kingdom) Nigel Mansell	Williams-Renault
Second	(Italy) Riccardo Patrese	Williams-Renault
Third	(United Kingdom) Martin Brundle	Benetton-Ford

The 1992 British Grand Prix was a Formula One motor race held on 12 July 1992 at Silverstone, Northamptonshire. It was the ninth round of the 1992 Formula One World Championship. The 59-lap race was won by Nigel Mansell for the Williams-Renault team, the Englishman also starting from pole position, leading every lap and setting the fastest lap of the race. Riccardo Patrese finished second in the other Williams car, with Martin Brundle third in a Benetton-Ford.

After Mansell won his home Grand Prix, the British spectators invaded the race track to congratulate their hero. Mansell's car was blocked by the crowd, preventing him from driving back to the pits. Eventually Mansell was returned to the pits by track marshals to attend the podium ceremony. The win was the 28th of Mansell's career, thus making him the most successful British Formula One driver of all time in terms of wins (surpassing Jackie Stewart's 27) until Lewis Hamilton won the 2014 Singapore Grand Prix.

Future World Champion Damon Hill made his first start, for the Brabham team. Two further future champions, Michael Schumacher and Mika Häkkinen, scored points.

== Qualifying ==
=== Pre-qualifying report ===
The Friday morning pre-qualifying pool was slightly changed at this Grand Prix, the mid-point of the season. Footwork driver Michele Alboreto was relieved of the necessity to pre-qualify, and was replaced in the pool by Gabriele Tarquini of Fondmetal. Thus both Fondmetal drivers were now required to pre-qualify, alongside the two Larrousse drivers and the two Andrea Moda drivers.

The session itself followed the usual pattern for this season, with the two Andrea Moda cars being the ones to drop out at this stage. Bertrand Gachot was comfortably fastest for Larrousse, with Tarquini over 2.7 seconds slower in second. Gachot's team-mate Ukyo Katayama was third, 1.4 seconds ahead of the final pre-qualifier, Andrea Chiesa, who was using the older Fondmetal GR01 after driving, and writing off, the new GR02 at the last race.

The Andrea Moda team had arrived at the circuit, unlike the previous event in France, and had engines with them, unlike the prior event in Canada. With the first part of the session taking place in damp conditions, Perry McCarthy was held in the pits by his team until the track was almost dry. However, he was then sent out with his team-mate Roberto Moreno's used wet tyres on his car, and managed only one timed lap before his clutch failed. Despite McCarthy setting a time fast enough to pre-qualify at that stage, all the other entrants subsequently took advantage of the drying track and went much faster. However, Moreno was still unable to match Chiesa's time, finishing fifth in the session, over 1.6 seconds slower than the Fondmetal.

=== Pre-qualifying classification ===
Pos	No	Driver	Constructor	Time	Gap
1	29	(France) Bertrand Gachot	Venturi-Lamborghini	1:24.650	—
2	15	(Italy) Gabriele Tarquini	Fondmetal-Ford	1:27.378	+2.728
3	30	(Japan) Ukyo Katayama	Venturi-Lamborghini	1:27.560	+2.910
4	14	(Switzerland) Andrea Chiesa	Fondmetal-Ford	1:28.965	+4.315
5	34	(Brazil) Roberto Moreno	Andrea Moda-Judd	1:30.592	+5.942
6	35	(United Kingdom) Perry McCarthy	Andrea Moda-Judd	1:46.719	+22.069

=== Qualifying report ===
Nigel Mansell dominated qualifying, taking his eighth pole position of the year by nearly two seconds from Williams teammate Riccardo Patrese with a further 0.8 seconds back to Ayrton Senna's McLaren in third. Alongside Senna on the second row was Michael Schumacher in the Benetton, with their respective teammates Gerhard Berger and Martin Brundle on the third row. Johnny Herbert was seventh in his Lotus, ahead of Jean Alesi's Ferrari, with Mika Häkkinen in the other Lotus and Érik Comas in the Ligier completing the top ten. Damon Hill qualified for the first time, taking the 26th and last slot in his Brabham.

=== Qualifying classification ===
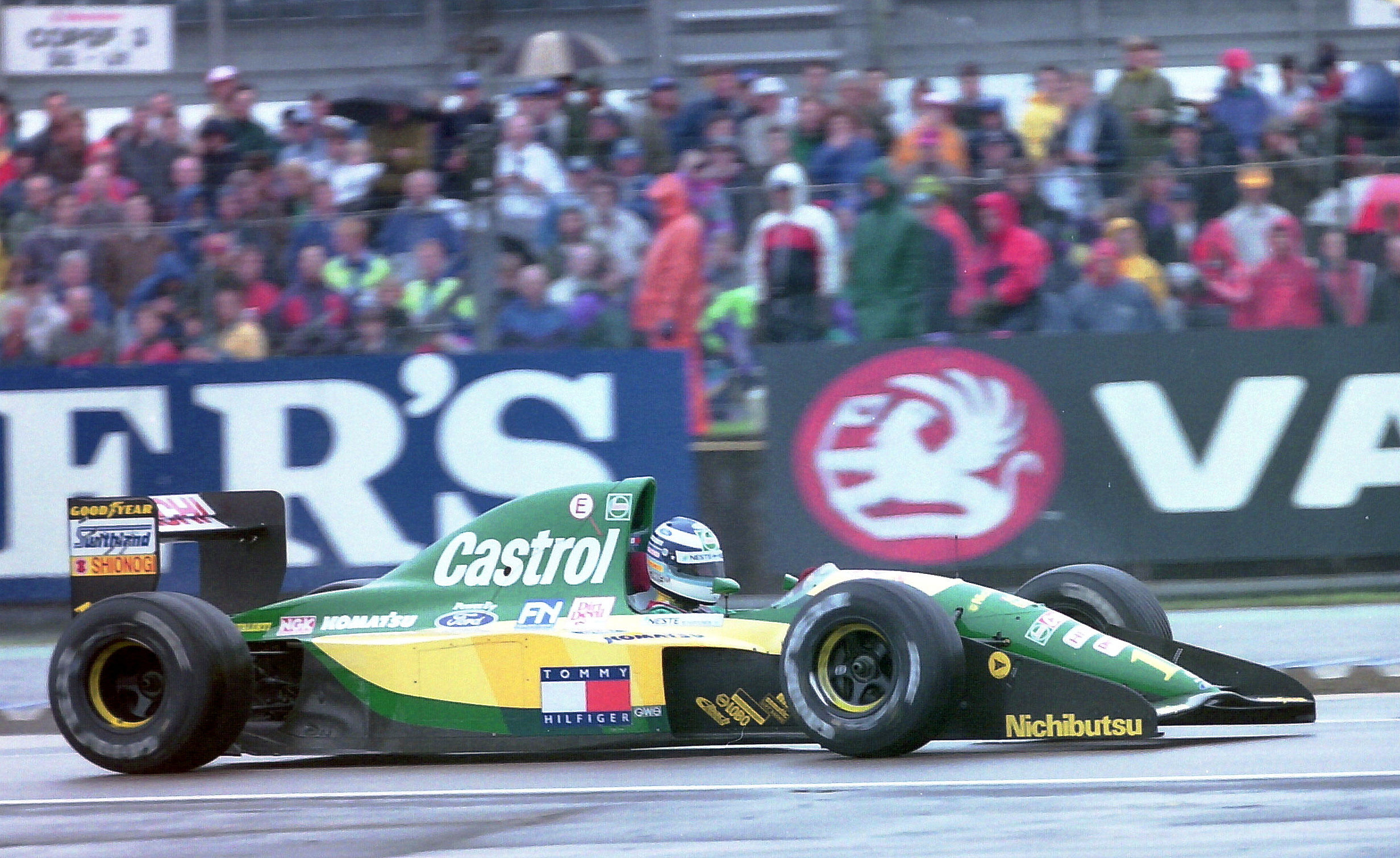
Mika Häkkinen finished sixth in his Lotus 107.

Pos	No	Driver	Constructor	Q1 Time	Q2 Time	Gap
1	5	(United Kingdom) Nigel Mansell	Williams-Renault	1:18.965	1:35.990	Pole
2	6	(Italy) Riccardo Patrese	Williams-Renault	1:20.884	1:38.185	+1.919
3	1	(Brazil) Ayrton Senna	McLaren-Honda	1:21.706	1:41.912	+2.741
4	19	(Germany) Michael Schumacher	Benetton-Ford	1:22.066	1:41.227	+3.101
5	2	(Austria) Gerhard Berger	McLaren-Honda	1:22.296	1:41.311	+3.331
6	20	(United Kingdom) Martin Brundle	Benetton-Ford	1:23.489	1:40.781	+4.524
7	12	(United Kingdom) Johnny Herbert	Lotus-Ford	1:23.605	1:42.124	+4.640
8	27	(France) Jean Alesi	Ferrari	1:23.723	1:39.961	+4.758
9	11	(Finland) Mika Häkkinen	Lotus-Ford	1:23.813	1:42.815	+4.848
10	26	(France) Érik Comas	Ligier-Renault	1:23.957	no time	+4.992
11	29	(France) Bertrand Gachot	Venturi-Lamborghini	1:24.065	1:45.881	+5.100
12	9	(Italy) Michele Alboreto	Footwork-Mugen-Honda	1:24.198	1:41.504	+5.233
13	25	(Belgium) Thierry Boutsen	Ligier-Renault	1:24.545	1:45.659	+5.580
14	28	(Italy) Ivan Capelli	Ferrari	1:24.558	1:41.734	+5.593
15	15	(Italy) Gabriele Tarquini	Fondmetal-Ford	1:24.761	1:49.639	+5.796
16	30	(Japan) Ukyo Katayama	Venturi-Lamborghini	1:24.851	1:46.644	+5.886
17	10	(Japan) Aguri Suzuki	Footwork- Mugen-Honda	1:24.924	1:43.215	+5.959
18	4	(Italy) Andrea de Cesaris	Tyrrell-Ilmor	1:24.984	1:42.160	+6.019
19	21	(Finland) JJ Lehto	Dallara-Ferrari	1:25.037	1:40.867	+6.072
20	3	(France) Olivier Grouillard	Tyrrell-Ilmor	1:25.096	1:41.221	+6.131
21	16	(Austria) Karl Wendlinger	March-Ilmor	1:25.123	no time	+6.131
22	22	(Italy) Pierluigi Martini	Dallara-Ferrari	1:25.221	1:46.295	+6.256
23	32	(Italy) Stefano Modena	Jordan-Yamaha	1:25.362	1:42.104	+6.397
24	33	(Brazil) Maurício Gugelmin	Jordan-Yamaha	1:25.988	no time	+7.023
25	24	(Italy) Gianni Morbidelli	Minardi-Lamborghini	1:25.998	1:43.981	+7.033
26	8	(United Kingdom) Damon Hill	Brabham-Judd	1:26.378	1:45.272	+7.413
27	23	(Italy) Alessandro Zanardi	Minardi-Lamborghini	1:26.458	no time	+7.493
28	17	(France) Paul Belmondo	March-Ilmor	1:27.995	no time	+9.030
29	14	(Switzerland) Andrea Chiesa	Fondmetal-Ford	1:28.452	no time	+9.487
30	7	(Belgium) Eric van de Poele	Brabham-Judd	1:28.719	no time	+9.754

== Race ==
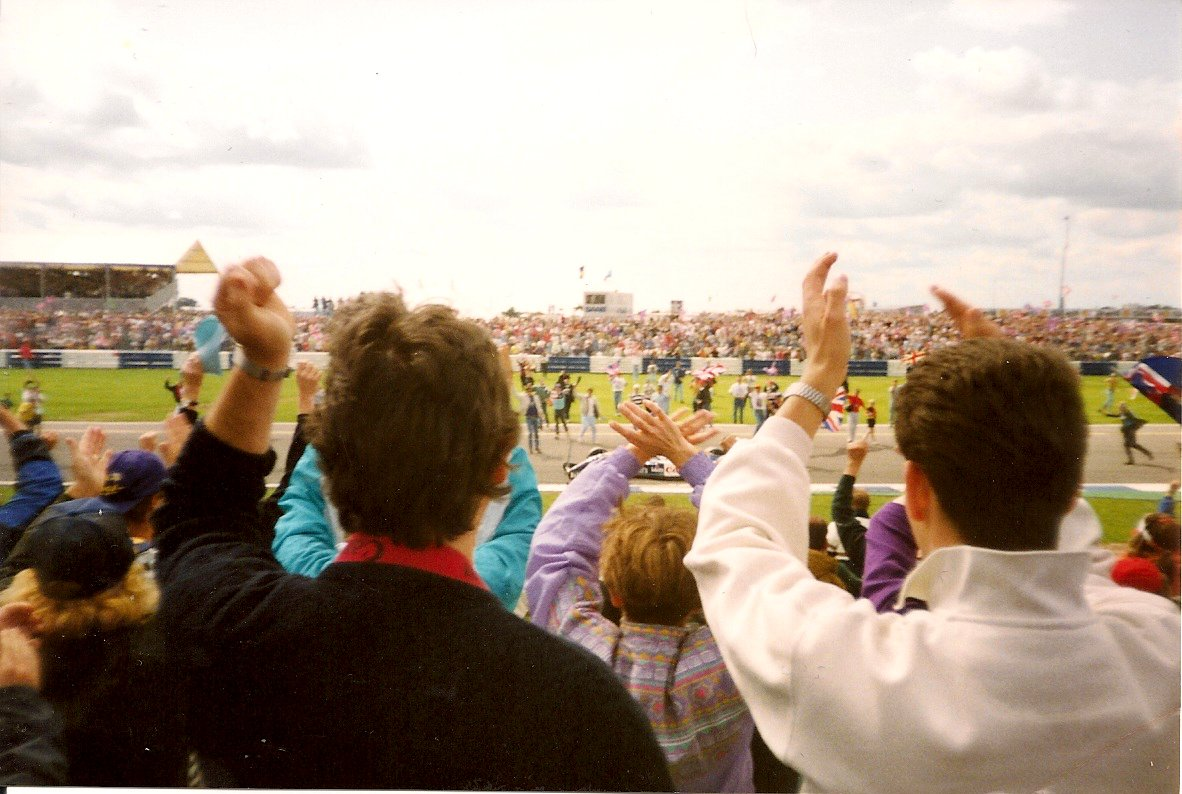
Fans invading the track at Copse Corner following Nigel Mansell's victory

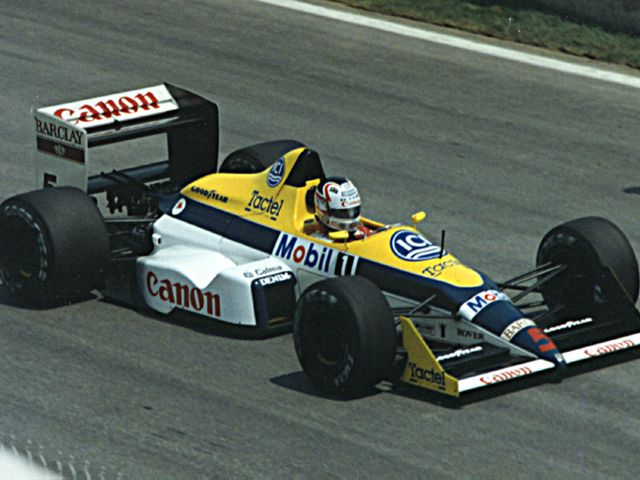
The win made Nigel Mansell (pictured in Canada in 1988) the most successful British driver of all time. His record was subsequently surpassed by Lewis Hamilton.

=== Race report ===
Though Patrese led at the first corner, Mansell soon re-passed his teammate and pulled away from the rest of the field, eventually winning by 39 seconds. Johnny Herbert became the first of the leaders to retire from 6th position in the leading Lotus by the pit wall with transmission problems on lap 32. Jean Alesi in the leading Ferrari eventually went off the track with mechanical problems by lap 44. Brundle made a fast start to run third, battling with his old Formula 3 rival Senna until the Brazilian suffered a transmission failure seven laps from the end. Brundle eventually finished nine seconds behind Patrese and five ahead of teammate Schumacher, who had lost time following a collision with the Jordan of Stefano Modena when he was trying to lap him. Berger finished fifth, right behind Schumacher despite an engine problem in the closing stages, while Häkkinen took the final point for sixth. Hill finished 16th, four laps behind Mansell; he and other drivers were still circulating when the spectators invaded the track to celebrate Mansell's win.

The win, Mansell's seventh of the season, moved him to 76 points in the Drivers' Championship, with Patrese on 40 and Schumacher on 29. In the Constructors' Championship, Williams had 116 points, with Benetton a distant second on 42 and McLaren on 38.

=== Race classification ===
Pos	No	Driver	Constructor	Laps	Time/Retired	Grid	Points
1	5	(United Kingdom) Nigel Mansell	Williams-Renault	59	1:25:42.991	1	10
2	6	(Italy) Riccardo Patrese	Williams-Renault	59	+ 39.094	2	6
3	20	(United Kingdom) Martin Brundle	Benetton-Ford	59	+ 48.395	6	4
4	19	(Germany) Michael Schumacher	Benetton-Ford	59	+ 53.267	4	3
5	2	(Austria) Gerhard Berger	McLaren-Honda	59	+ 55.795	5	2
6	11	(Finland) Mika Häkkinen	Lotus-Ford	59	+ 1:20.138	9	1
7	9	(Italy) Michele Alboreto	Footwork-Mugen-Honda	58	+ 1 lap	12	
8	26	(France) Érik Comas	Ligier-Renault	58	+ 1 lap	10	
9	28	(Italy) Ivan Capelli	Ferrari	58	+ 1 lap	14	
10	25	(Belgium) Thierry Boutsen	Ligier-Renault	57	+ 2 laps	13	
11	3	(France) Olivier Grouillard	Tyrrell-Ilmor	57	+ 2 laps	20	
12	10	(Japan) Aguri Suzuki	Footwork-Mugen-Honda	57	+ 2 laps	17	
13	21	(Finland) JJ Lehto	Dallara-Ferrari	57	+ 2 laps	19	
14	15	(Italy) Gabriele Tarquini	Fondmetal-Ford	57	+ 2 laps	15	
15	22	(Italy) Pierluigi Martini	Dallara-Ferrari	56	+ 3 laps	22	
16	8	(United Kingdom) Damon Hill	Brabham-Judd	55	+ 4 laps	26	
17	24	(Italy) Gianni Morbidelli	Minardi-Lamborghini	53	Engine	25	
Ret	1	(Brazil) Ayrton Senna	McLaren-Honda	52	Transmission	3	
Ret	4	(Italy) Andrea de Cesaris	Tyrrell-Ilmor	46	Spun off	18	
Ret	27	(France) Jean Alesi	Ferrari	43	Fire extinguisher	8	
Ret	32	(Italy) Stefano Modena	Jordan-Yamaha	43	Engine	23	
Ret	33	(Brazil) Maurício Gugelmin	Jordan-Yamaha	37	Engine	24	
Ret	29	(France) Bertrand Gachot	Venturi-Lamborghini	32	Wheel	11	
Ret	12	(United Kingdom) Johnny Herbert	Lotus-Ford	31	Transmission	7	
Ret	16	(Austria) Karl Wendlinger	March-Ilmor	27	Gearbox	21	
Ret	30	(Japan) Ukyo Katayama	Venturi-Lamborghini	27	Transmission	16	
DNQ	23	(Italy) Alessandro Zanardi	Minardi-Lamborghini				
DNQ	17	(France) Paul Belmondo	March-Ilmor				
DNQ	14	(Switzerland) Andrea Chiesa	Fondmetal-Ford				
DNQ	7	(Belgium) Eric van de Poele	Brabham-Judd				
DNPQ	34	(Brazil) Roberto Moreno	Andrea Moda-Judd				
DNPQ	35	(United Kingdom) Perry McCarthy	Andrea Moda-Judd				

== Championship standings after the race ==
Drivers' Championship standings

Pos	Driver	Points
1	(United Kingdom) Nigel Mansell	76
2	(Italy) Riccardo Patrese	40
3	(Germany) Michael Schumacher	29
4	(Austria) Gerhard Berger	20
5	(Brazil) Ayrton Senna	18

Constructors' Championship standings

	Pos	Constructor	Points
	1	(United Kingdom) Williams-Renault	116
1	2	(United Kingdom) Benetton-Ford	42
1	3	(United Kingdom) McLaren-Honda	38
	4	(Italy) Ferrari	13
	5	(United Kingdom) Lotus-Ford	7

- Note: Only the top five positions are included for both sets of standings.

Previous race: 1992 French Grand Prix	FIA Formula One World Championship; 1992 season	Next race: 1992 German Grand Prix
Previous race: 1991 British Grand Prix	British Grand Prix	Next race: 1993 British Grand Prix
