= Fondmetal =

Italian manufacturer of alloy wheels

(Italy) Fondmetal
- Full name: Fondmetal Corse
- Base: Bergamo, Italy
- Founder(s): Gabriele Rumi
- Noted staff: Tino Belli; Sergio Rinland
- Noted drivers: (France) Olivier Grouillard (Italy) Gabriele Tarquini (Switzerland) Andrea Chiesa (Belgium) Eric van de Poele
- Previous name: Osella Squadra Corse

Formula One World Championship career
- First entry: 1991 United States Grand Prix
- Races entered: 29 (19 starts)
- Engines: Ford
- Constructors' Championships: 0
- Drivers' Championships: 0
- Race victories: 0
- Pole positions: 0
- Fastest laps: 0
- Final entry: 1992 Italian Grand Prix

Fondmetal S.p.A. is an Italian manufacturer of alloy wheels, founded in 1972 by Gabriele Rumi.

A Formula One constructor of the same name, also owned by Rumi, competed in the 1991 and 1992 seasons, scoring no championship points. The company also sponsored, and supplied wheels to, numerous other constructors from the mid-1980s to the early 2000s.

In 2014 the Fondmetal brand expanded to the United States and became known as Fondmetal USA. All wheels continue to be made in Italy and are TÜV approved.

== Early years ==
In 1961, Gabriele Rumi took over the iron foundry business that had been established by his grandfather in Brescia. A motor racing enthusiast, the business allowed him to compete in hillclimbs and in the Formula Monza category during the 1960s.

Rumi had a passion for cars and racing and saw a demand for the manufacturing of parts for the automobile industry. In Palosco they made induction manifolds, water conduits, clutch bellhousing, oil pumps, cylinder heads and engine blocks for clients such as Maserati Biturbo, Fiat, Iveco, OM and Magneti Marelli.

For Rumi this was not enough. He found himself too reliant on his customers in a sensitive time period following the oil crisis. This led him to launch his own product line in 1972.

The choice of product was alloy wheels, due to his involvement and passion for the automobile industry. From there the Fondmetal brand grew, and was established as a leader in forged and cost wheel design, engineering and manufacturing in Italy.

Fondmetal first appeared in Formula One in 1983 as a sponsor for Italian driver Piercarlo Ghinzani. In the mid-1980s, the company supplied wheels to Williams, Tyrrell and Ligier, while continuing to sponsor Ghinzani and, later, the Osella team. In 1989, Fondmetal became Osella's major sponsor, and by 1990 Rumi had become the team's majority shareholder. At the end of that year, he decided to take over the whole operation.

== Team Fondmetal ==
Rumi transferred the team from Volpiano near Turin to his headquarters in Bergamo and ran it for one and a half years on his own. He initially persevered with Osella's driver, Olivier Grouillard, until he tired of the Frenchman's reckless side and attitude problem, replacing him with Gabriele Tarquini. The new team was no more successful than in the Osella days, sometimes the results being even worse than those of its fellow back row contenders Coloni or AGS.

=== 1991 ===
For the 1991 Formula One season, Osella Squadra Corse was gone; the team re-appeared as Fondmetal Corse. Initially, Fondmetal entered the FA1M-E car which was a mere carry-over from the previous year (and, in fact, from 1989 as Osella had not been able to construct a new car in 1990). Driven by Olivier Grouillard, the blue and grey coloured machine was uncompetitive by any means. Although Fondmetal was able to use Cosworth engines prepared by Brian Hart for the previous years' Tyrrell, even Pedro Chaves in his Coloni was ahead of the Fondmetal car. In that hostile atmosphere, pre-qualification turned out to be impossible. But Rumi had high hopes for the European season. By the San Marino Grand Prix, a new car appeared, called the Fomet-1. It was conceived by a newly founded think-tank in the UK called Fomet. The Bicester-based design office was headed by Tino Belli and founded by Rumi who thought that British input was necessary for gaining success. The Fomet-1 featured new aerodynamics, a new suspension and some other improvements, but apart from this, the new car obviously preserved its Osella roots. Finally, things improved a little, but not significantly. With the new car, Grouillard managed to be faster than the Scuderia Coloni machine, but that does not mean that Fondmetal was able to pass pre-qualifying regularly. Only a handful of race participations were possible, but results were poor, although Grouillard did qualify 10th for the 1991 Mexican Grand Prix, ahead of Andrea de Cesaris in the Jordan, who eventually finished 4th. In the end, Grouillard was replaced by former AGS man Gabriele Tarquini who finished twice (from three attempts), although he also failed to pre-qualify once; but no points were scored in the end.

=== 1992 ===
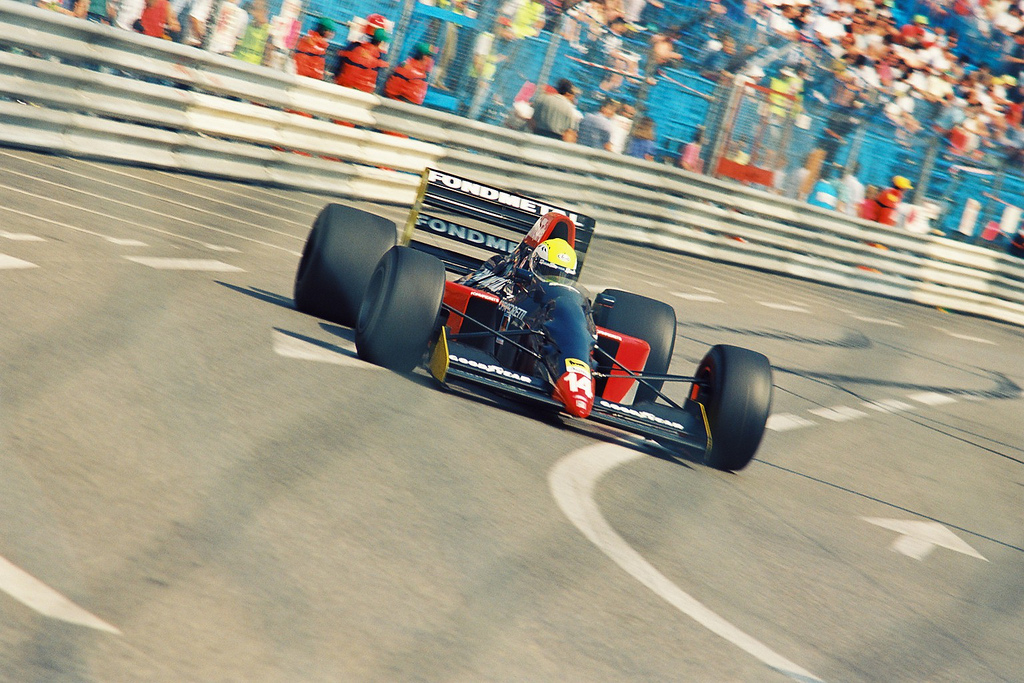
Andrea Chiesa driving the GR01 during the Thursday practice session for the 1992 Monaco Grand Prix.

At the end of 1991, the British subsidiary Fomet was sold. Its designers had been working on a new Formula One car since the previous summer. Tino Belli sold the designs of the new car to the Larrousse Formula One team which left Fondmetal without a new car for the next season. In late December 1991 Gabriele Rumi commissioned Sergio Rinland from Astauto to design a new car. It was not ready for the start of the season, so the team used the previous year's car for the first few races. The car received a Ford HB V8 engine (from the previous year's Benetton) to replace the Lamborghini V12 or the Judd V10 that Rumi had preferred. The engine and the chassis did not go together well. There were some cooling troubles, and reliability was poor. The team appeared with two drivers, Tarquini, the other one being the Swiss debutant Andrea Chiesa. Tarquini showed speed, but the car broke down frequently.

In late spring Rinland's new chassis was ready to race. The GR02 had nothing in common with former years' Osellas and Fondmetals. The roots of its design dated back to late 1991 when he was working for the Brabham team on the Brabham BT61 that never saw the light of day. Elements of its design were carried over to the 1992 Fondmetal. Its drivers found it an improvement over the GR01, but it had disappointing race results, with minor problems often stopping the cars after they qualified well. The team was poorly funded so tests were few and development was slow. Finishes were rare. Tarquini often qualified his car relatively high in the order, and at the Belgian Grand Prix put in Fondmetal's best qualifying performance of the season to qualify 11th. Chiesa often failed to qualify, and was replaced by Eric van de Poele for the Hungarian Grand Prix.

While van de Poele proved competitive, he spun off on the third lap in Hungary, losing the Italian team's last good chance of a points finish. Tarquini had already collided with Herbert's Lotus and with the Ligiers of Boutsen and Comas in the first lap.

Only two races later after the Italian Grand Prix in September 1992, the team withdrew from the championship for financial reasons, having scored a pair of 10th places, although Tarquini managed to qualify for all thirteen races in which the team participated in 1992 and Chiesa (in ten attempts) and van de Poele (in only three) qualified three times each.

The team's mounting debt coincided with a global recession. Rumi contemplated racing Giuseppe Bugatti as a pay-driver in order to get through the 1992 Portuguese Grand Prix, but decided instead to close his team.

== Later relations with other teams ==
=== Forti Corse ===
During 1992 Sergio Rinland and his Astauto team started to work on a 1993 F1 car in the hope that Fondmetal would carry on. That was not the case, since the contract was cancelled by Fondmetal in September 1992, well before the end of the season due to lack of funds. The design of that car was finished in early 1993. A year later, Rinland sold that design to Guido Forti who started running a Formula One team called Forti by 1995. The team's FG01 chassis still had several similarities to the, by then three year-old, 1992 Fondmetal GR02.

=== Tyrrell and Minardi ===
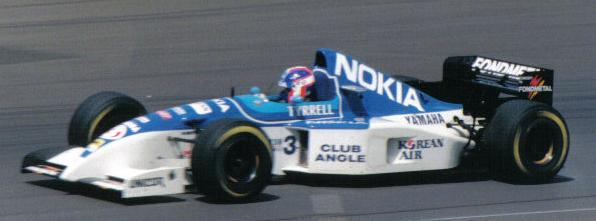
Fondmetal sponsored the Tyrrell team in 1995.

Rumi would return to Formula One in a more modest capacity in 1994, with Fondmetal as a technical partner and sponsor of Tyrrell, and for 1996 Minardi. Fondmetal's wind tunnel in Northern Italy was leased to Tyrrell, Minardi and other teams. Rumi would gradually increase his interest in the Faenza outfit, becoming co-owner and chairman, even going as far as rebadging the Ford Zetec-R engines in 2000. However, Rumi was diagnosed with cancer, and was forced to withdraw his backing later that year when the team was sold to Paul Stoddart. Rumi eventually died in May 2001. Fondmetal is still in operation as a wheel manufacturer.

== Complete Formula One results ==
(key)

Year	Chassis	Engine	Tyres	Drivers	1	2	3	4	5	6	7	8	9	10	11	12	13	14	15	16	Points	WCC
1991	Fondmetal FA1M-E; Fomet-1	Ford Cosworth DFR 3.5 V8	G		USA	BRA	SMR	MON	CAN	MEX	FRA	GBR	GER	HUN	BEL	ITA	POR	ESP	JPN	AUS	0	NC
1991	Fondmetal FA1M-E; Fomet-1	Ford Cosworth DFR 3.5 V8	G	(France) Olivier Grouillard	DNPQ	DNPQ	DNPQ	DNPQ	DNPQ	Ret	Ret	DNPQ	DNPQ	DNQ	10	Ret	DNPQ				0	NC
1991	Fondmetal FA1M-E; Fomet-1	Ford Cosworth DFR 3.5 V8	G	(Italy) Gabriele Tarquini														12	11	DNPQ	0	NC
1992	Fondmetal GR01; Fondmetal GR02	Ford HBA5 3.5 V8	G		RSA	MEX	BRA	ESP	SMR	MON	CAN	FRA	GBR	GER	HUN	BEL	ITA	POR	JPN	AUS	0	NC
1992	Fondmetal GR01; Fondmetal GR02	Ford HBA5 3.5 V8	G	(Italy) Gabriele Tarquini	Ret	Ret	Ret	Ret	Ret	Ret	Ret	Ret	14	Ret	Ret	Ret	Ret				0	NC
1992	Fondmetal GR01; Fondmetal GR02	Ford HBA5 3.5 V8	G	(Switzerland) Andrea Chiesa	DNQ	Ret	DNQ	Ret	DNQ	DNQ	DNQ	Ret	DNQ	DNQ							0	NC
1992	Fondmetal GR01; Fondmetal GR02	Ford HBA5 3.5 V8	G	(Belgium) Eric van de Poele											Ret	10	Ret				0	NC

=== As engine supplier ===
Year	Entrant	Chassis	Engine	Tyres	Drivers	1	2	3	4	5	6	7	8	9	10	11	12	13	14	15	16	17	Points	WCC
2000	Telefónica Minardi Fondmetal	Minardi M02	Fondmetal RV10 3.0 V10	B		AUS	BRA	SMR	GBR	ESP	EUR	MON	CAN	FRA	AUT	GER	HUN	BEL	ITA	USA	JPN	MAL	0	NC
2000	Telefónica Minardi Fondmetal	Minardi M02	Fondmetal RV10 3.0 V10	B	(Spain) Marc Gené	8	Ret	Ret	14	14	Ret	Ret	16^{†}	15	8	Ret	15	14	9	12	Ret	Ret	0	NC
2000	Telefónica Minardi Fondmetal	Minardi M02	Fondmetal RV10 3.0 V10	B	(Argentina) Gastón Mazzacane	Ret	10	13	15	15	8	Ret	12	Ret	12	11	Ret	17	10	Ret	15	13^{†}	0	NC
