= Sergio Rinland =

Argentine engineer and car designer (born 1952)

- Born: Sergio Oscar Rinland; 17 March 1952 (age 74)

Sergio Oscar Rinland (born 17 March 1952) is an Argentine engineer best known for his work in Formula One. He is currently owner and managing director of the automotive engineering and management consulting company Astauto Ltd.

== Career ==
Born in Buenos Aires, Argentina on March 17, 1952, Rinland studied mechanical engineering at Argentina's Universidad Nacional del Sur, graduating in 1978. His thesis was a vehicle suspension system mathematical model and computer simulation and the design of a F2 car as its application, his mentors were Prof. José Santamarina and Prof. Walter Daub. After two years working in Argentina's F2, he moved to Great Britain in 1980, where he soon found a job as a designer for PRS, a small Formula Ford constructor owned by Vic Holman, where he designed their Formula Ford 1600 and Formula Ford 2000 cars for the 1982 and 1983 seasons, with success in the UK, Europe and US. After a short spell working for Ron Tauranac at Ralt, Rinland was hired by the RAM F1 team in 1983 to work on the design team, first with Dave Kelly and in 1985 with Gustav Brunner where they produced the RAM 03. For 1986, he moved on to Williams and was part of the design team of the very successful FW11, led by Patrick Head and Frank Dernie.

In 1987, Rinland joined Brabham where he designed the Brabham BT56 together with David North and John Baldwin. At the end of 1987, Brabham temporarily withdrew from F1 allowing Rinland to move to Dallara to design its first F1 car raced by BMS Scuderia Italia in 1988. Brabham returned in 1989 calling Rinland back as Chief Designer, a position he kept until the end of 1991. There, Rinland designed the Brabham BT58, Brabham BT59 and the Brabham BT60-Yamaha.

Rinland then established his own design company, Astauto Ltd in Tolworth, England. Astauto was then hired to design and build the F1 cars for Fondmetal. The car only did few races in 1992 before the team closed down due to financial difficulties. The Fondmetal GR02 was hailed as a very innovative design by reputable publications.

Rinland then was hired by Dan Gurney's All American Racers in the U.S. where he worked in the feasibility study of the Toyota Champ Car for CART.

Returning to Europe in 1995, Rinland worked briefly for the new Forti team and soon after was hired to work in the German Touring Car Championship with Opel by Keke Rosberg for the remaining of the 1995 season.

From 1996 to 1999, Rinland worked for Benetton Formula 1 Team. At the end of 1999 Rinland was head-hunted by the Sauber F1 team to become their Chief Designer. As a Chief Designer he was responsible for the C20, Sauber's most successful F1 car to that point. This car featured several innovations, the most notable being the "Twin Keel" front suspension.

By September 2001, Rinland was tempted to join Arrows as a Chief Designer but one year later the team ran into financial difficulties and closed down.

After Arrows, Rinland decided to develop his consultancy company Astauto Ltd, doing work for Pankl GmbH, the Austrian F1 supplier, VLR Touring Car Team, Red Bull Cheever Racing in IRL, Coloni and Trident Racing in GP2 and Team Modena in the Le Mans 24 Hours and the Le Mans Series for 2006 and 2007. In 2006 he also gained an MBA degree from Kingston University London.

From December 2007 to January 2011, Rinland was engineering director of Epsilon Euskadi in Spain as well as developing his consultancy companies in Europe and the US. In his capacity at Epsilon Euskadi, Rinland was responsible for the 2008 Le Mans campaign as well as other racing and non-racing projects of the company.

From February 2011, Rinland is involved in running his consultancy company Astauto Ltd in Europe, US and South America.

Of late, Rinland has been heavily involved in simulation and alternative energy for motorsports with the research and development of a Formula 1 performance electric race car and as a spin-off a development of an FIA Formula E which will be unveiled once the FIA officially announces Formula E.

In the simulation area, Rinland has been advising Hertfordshire University on their recently acquired Driver in the Loop Simulator as well as performing the simulations of the revolutionary Delta Wing Le Mans car.

Rinland has recently worked at Oxford Brookes University to help teach and develop student skills with AVL VSM Lap Time Simulation Software. He has also been working with Oxford Brookes Racing Formula Student Team to help develop an accurate lap time simulation model.
