= 1991 British Grand Prix =

- Race 8 of 16 in the 1991 Formula One World Championship
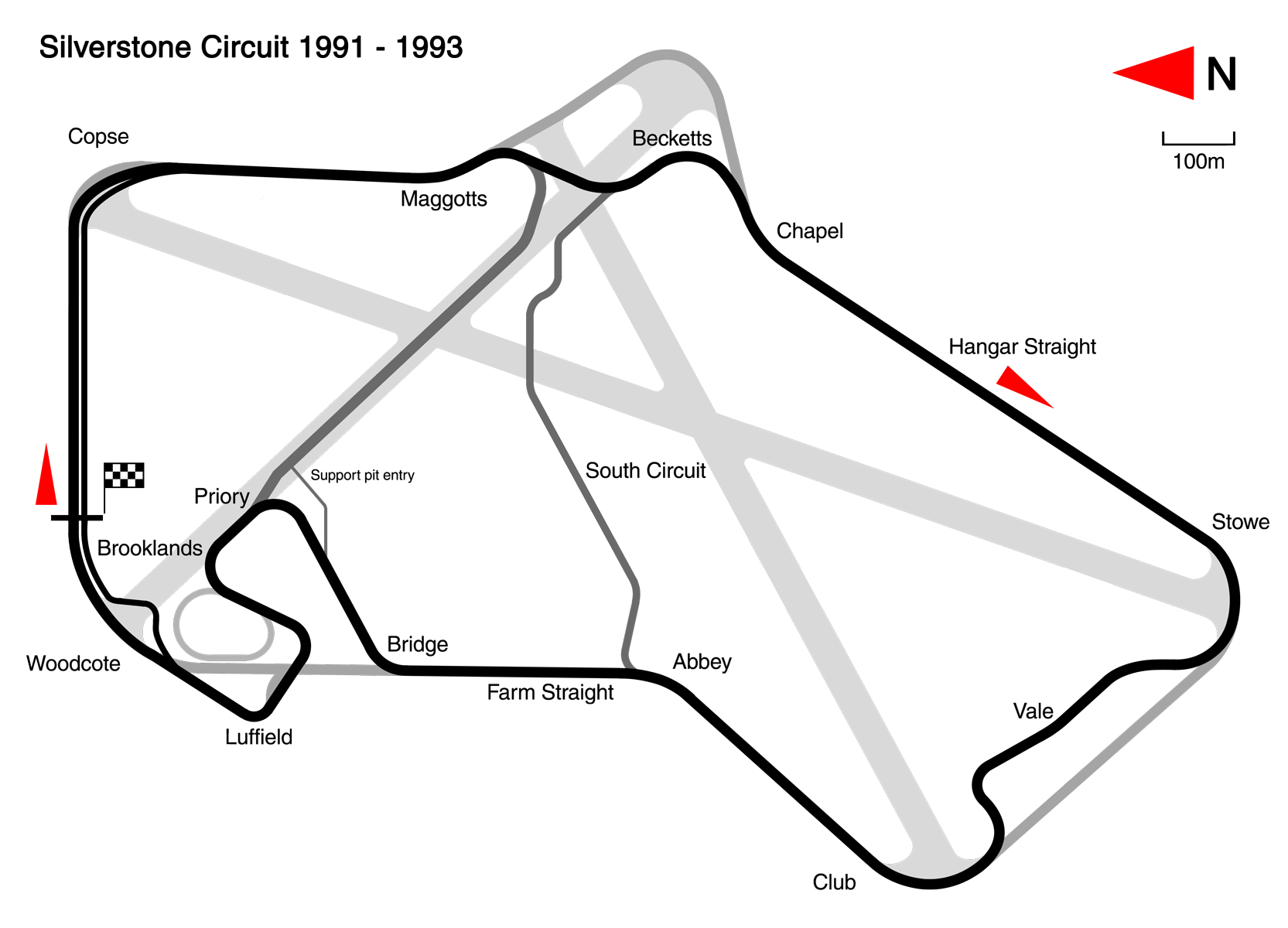

Race details
- Date: 14 July 1991
- Official name: XLIV Foster's British Grand Prix
- Location: Silverstone Circuit; Silverstone, United Kingdom
- Course: Permanent racing facility
- Course length: 5.226 km (3.247 miles)
- Distance: 59 laps, 308.334 km (191.59 miles)
- Weather: Hot, dry, sunny

Pole position
Driver	(United Kingdom) Nigel Mansell	Williams-Renault
- Time: 1:20.939

Fastest lap
Driver	(United Kingdom) Nigel Mansell	Williams-Renault
- Time: 1:26.379 on lap 43

Podium
First	(United Kingdom) Nigel Mansell	Williams-Renault
Second	(Austria) Gerhard Berger	McLaren-Honda
Third	(France) Alain Prost	Ferrari

The 1991 British Grand Prix was a Formula One motor race held at Silverstone on 14 July 1991. It was the eighth race of the 1991 FIA Formula One World Championship.

The 59-lap race was won from pole position by local driver Nigel Mansell, driving a Williams-Renault. Gerhard Berger finished second in a McLaren-Honda, with Alain Prost third in a Ferrari. Drivers' Championship leader, Ayrton Senna, ran out of fuel in the second McLaren-Honda on the final lap and was classified fourth. As well as winning from pole position, Mansell led every lap and posted the fastest lap of the race. It was the first of two consecutive grand slams at the Silverstone circuit for Mansell, who repeated the feat the following year in 1992.

== Pre-race ==
Mansell-mania greeted the drivers as they arrived at Silverstone for the British Grand Prix. The track had been vastly remodelled for 1991, which garnered largely positive reviews from the drivers. The track was no longer the fastest on the F1 calendar, but it now included many challenging corners for the drivers. Elsewhere Tom Walkinshaw had bought a 35% stake in the Benetton team, but the driver line-ups were unchanged from the previous race. Stefan Johansson continued to stand in for the injured Alex Caffi at Footwork, although it was the last race he would do so.

== Qualifying ==
=== Pre-qualifying report ===
The Friday morning pre-qualifying session resulted in a return to the Dallara / Jordan lockout seen three times earlier in the season. JJ Lehto was fastest in the Dallara, with Andrea de Cesaris' Jordan nearly seven tenths of a second slower in second position. Third was the Dallara of Emanuele Pirro, with Bertrand Gachot's Jordan a couple of tenths further back in fourth.

After pre-qualifying successfully at the last two Grands Prix, Olivier Grouillard missed out this time in fifth place for Fondmetal. The Modena Lambos were again sixth and seventh, with Nicola Larini again faster than Eric van de Poele. Nine tenths of a second further back in eighth was Pedro Chaves in the Coloni.

=== Pre-qualifying classification ===
Pos	No	Driver	Constructor	Time	Gap
1	22	(Finland) JJ Lehto	Dallara-Judd	1:24.825	—
2	33	(Italy) Andrea de Cesaris	Jordan-Ford	1:25.508	+0.683
3	21	(Italy) Emanuele Pirro	Dallara-Judd	1:25.726	+0.901
4	32	(Belgium) Bertrand Gachot	Jordan-Ford	1:25.931	+1.106
5	14	(France) Olivier Grouillard	Fondmetal-Ford	1:26.299	+1.474
6	34	(Italy) Nicola Larini	Lambo-Lamborghini	1:28.042	+3.217
7	35	(Belgium) Eric van de Poele	Lambo-Lamborghini	1:28.827	+4.002
8	31	(Portugal) Pedro Chaves	Coloni-Ford	1:29.735	+4.910

=== Qualifying report ===
In qualifying Nigel Mansell took pole in front of his home fans, with title rival Ayrton Senna second. Riccardo Patrese was third, followed by Gerhard Berger, Alain Prost, Jean Alesi, Roberto Moreno, Nelson Piquet, Maurício Gugelmin, and Stefano Modena.

=== Qualifying classification ===
Pos	No	Driver	Constructor	Q1	Q2	Gap
1	5	(United Kingdom) Nigel Mansell	Williams-Renault	1:22.644	1:20.939	–
2	1	(Brazil) Ayrton Senna	McLaren-Honda	1:23.277	1:21.618	+0.679
3	6	(Italy) Riccardo Patrese	Williams-Renault	1:23.436	1:22.109	+1.170
4	2	(Austria) Gerhard Berger	McLaren-Honda	1:23.045	1:22.476	+1.537
5	27	(France) Alain Prost	Ferrari	1:24.726	1:22.478	+1.539
6	28	(France) Jean Alesi	Ferrari	1:24.520	1:22.881	+1.942
7	19	(Brazil) Roberto Moreno	Benetton-Ford	1:25.715	1:23.265	+2.326
8	20	(Brazil) Nelson Piquet	Benetton-Ford	1:25.107	1:23.626	+2.687
9	15	(Brazil) Maurício Gugelmin	Leyton House-Ilmor	1:25.834	1:24.044	+3.105
10	4	(Italy) Stefano Modena	Tyrrell-Honda	1:24.925	1:24.069	+3.130
11	22	(Finland) JJ Lehto	Dallara-Judd	1:24.997	1:24.141	+3.202
12	8	(United Kingdom) Mark Blundell	Brabham-Yamaha	1:26.117	1:24.165	+3.226
13	33	(Italy) Andrea de Cesaris	Jordan-Ford	1:24.169	1:24.319	+3.230
14	7	(United Kingdom) Martin Brundle	Brabham-Yamaha	1:25.803	1:24.345	+3.406
15	3	(Japan) Satoru Nakajima	Tyrrell-Honda	1:26.229	1:24.560	+3.621
16	16	(Italy) Ivan Capelli	Leyton House-Ilmor	1:25.951	1:24.587	+3.648
17	32	(Belgium) Bertrand Gachot	Jordan-Ford	1:25.323	1:24.592	+3.653
18	21	(Italy) Emanuele Pirro	Dallara-Judd	1:25.136	1:24.654	+3.715
19	25	(Belgium) Thierry Boutsen	Ligier-Lamborghini	1:25.530	1:25.174	+4.235
20	24	(Italy) Gianni Morbidelli	Minardi-Ferrari	1:27.367	1:25.222	+4.283
21	29	(France) Éric Bernard	Lola-Ford	1:26.235	1:25.537	+4.598
22	30	(Japan) Aguri Suzuki	Lola-Ford	1:26.438	1:25.583	+4.644
23	23	(Italy) Pierluigi Martini	Minardi-Ferrari	1:27.279	1:25.583	+4.644
24	12	(United Kingdom) Johnny Herbert	Lotus-Judd	1:27.207	1:25.689	+4.750
25	11	(Finland) Mika Häkkinen	Lotus-Judd	1:26.936	1:25.872	+4.933
26	9	(Italy) Michele Alboreto	Footwork-Ford	1:27.193	1:26.192	+5.253
27	26	(France) Érik Comas	Ligier-Lamborghini	1:26.486	1:26.392	+5.453
28	10	(Sweden) Stefan Johansson	Footwork-Ford	1:28.204	1:26.544	+5.605
29	18	(Italy) Fabrizio Barbazza	AGS-Ford	1:31.697	1:28.122	+7.183
30	17	(Italy) Gabriele Tarquini	AGS-Ford	1:31.130	1:28.136	+7.197

== Race ==
=== Race report ===
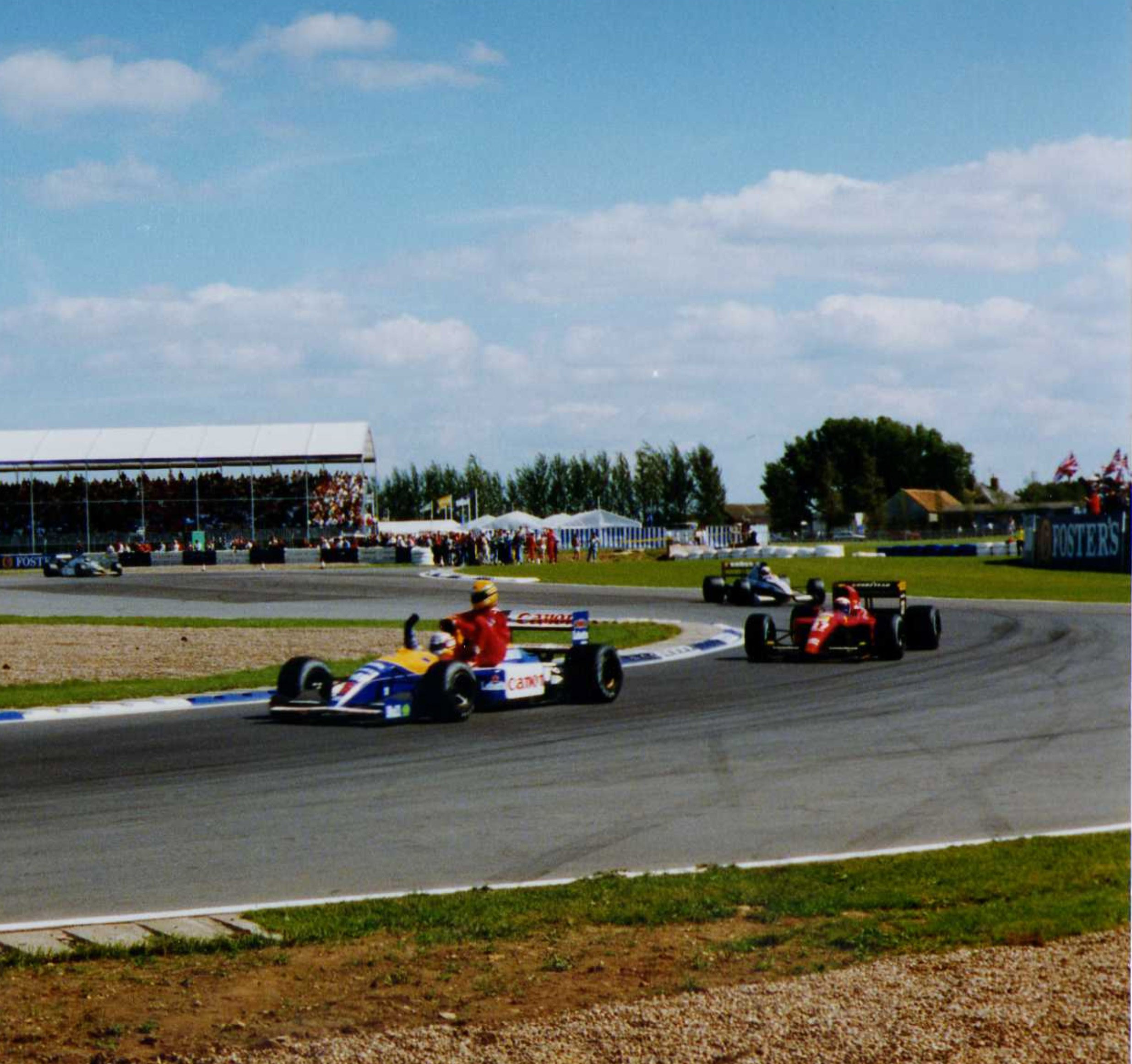
Nigel Mansell gives Ayrton Senna a lift back to the paddock at Silverstone during his victory lap, after Senna had run out of fuel.

Senna made a rocket start to lead Mansell, while Patrese was the first casualty of the day, having been bumped off by Berger (Patrese retired after the first lap as a result). Senna's lead did not last for long as Mansell re-passed him going into Stowe corner. Roberto Moreno in the Benetton retired from sixth place with a gearbox failure on lap 22.

Mansell and Senna proceeded to rocket off into the distance while Berger, Prost, and Alesi squabbled over third place, with Alesi emerging ahead; he would later retire after colliding with Aguri Suzuki while trying to lap the Japanese driver's Lola.

Andrea de Cesaris had a huge accident on Lap 41 when his suspension failed at Abbey corner, his car bounced back across the track and narrowly missed Satoru Nakajima's Tyrrell; de Cesaris was unhurt.

At the front it was all Mansell as the Englishman recorded his second win in succession, while rival Senna running in second place ran out of fuel on the last lap and was classified fourth. Berger ended up second, followed by Prost, Senna, Piquet, and Bertrand Gachot's Jordan. Mansell now trailed Senna by only 18 points and momentum was on his side.

While completing his victory lap Mansell stopped beside Senna and his out of fuel car. Mansell then had Senna climb on his car with Senna placing one leg in the cockpit and sitting on the car body, Mansell drove him back to pit lane.

In terms of having to pre-qualify, Brabham would have needed their top car at least in 7th position to demote the Leyton House team, but neither Brundle nor Blundell finished the race (Brundle retired with a broken throttle and Mark Blundell retired with engine failure later in the race on lap 53).

=== Race classification ===
Pos	No	Driver	Constructor	Laps	Time/Retired	Grid	Points
1	5	(United Kingdom) Nigel Mansell	Williams-Renault	59	1:27:35.479	1	10
2	2	(Austria) Gerhard Berger	McLaren-Honda	59	+ 42.293	4	6
3	27	(France) Alain Prost	Ferrari	59	+ 1:00.150	5	4
4	1	(Brazil) Ayrton Senna	McLaren-Honda	58	Out of fuel	2	3
5	20	(Brazil) Nelson Piquet	Benetton-Ford	58	+ 1 lap	8	2
6	32	(Belgium) Bertrand Gachot	Jordan-Ford	58	+ 1 lap	17	1
7	4	(Italy) Stefano Modena	Tyrrell-Honda	58	+ 1 lap	10	
8	3	(Japan) Satoru Nakajima	Tyrrell-Honda	58	+ 1 lap	15	
9	23	(Italy) Pierluigi Martini	Minardi-Ferrari	58	+ 1 lap	23	
10	21	(Italy) Emanuele Pirro	Dallara-Judd	57	+ 2 laps	18	
11	24	(Italy) Gianni Morbidelli	Minardi-Ferrari	57	+ 2 laps	20	
12	11	(Finland) Mika Häkkinen	Lotus-Judd	57	+ 2 laps	25	
13	22	(Finland) JJ Lehto	Dallara-Judd	56	+ 3 laps	11	
14	12	(United Kingdom) Johnny Herbert	Lotus-Judd	55	Oil pressure	24	
Ret	8	(United Kingdom) Mark Blundell	Brabham-Yamaha	52	Engine	12	
Ret	33	(Italy) Andrea de Cesaris	Jordan-Ford	41	Suspension/Accident	13	
Ret	28	(France) Jean Alesi	Ferrari	31	Collision	6	
Ret	30	(Japan) Aguri Suzuki	Lola-Ford	29	Collision	22	
Ret	25	(Belgium) Thierry Boutsen	Ligier-Lamborghini	29	Engine	19	
Ret	7	(United Kingdom) Martin Brundle	Brabham-Yamaha	28	Throttle	14	
Ret	9	(Italy) Michele Alboreto	Footwork-Ford	25	Transmission	26	
Ret	15	(Brazil) Maurício Gugelmin	Leyton House-Ilmor	24	Broken floor	9	
Ret	19	(Brazil) Roberto Moreno	Benetton-Ford	21	Gearbox	7	
Ret	29	(France) Éric Bernard	Lola-Ford	21	Transmission	21	
Ret	16	(Italy) Ivan Capelli	Leyton House-Ilmor	16	Spun off	16	
Ret	6	(Italy) Riccardo Patrese	Williams-Renault	1	Collision	3	
DNQ	26	(France) Érik Comas	Ligier-Lamborghini				
DNQ	10	(Sweden) Stefan Johansson	Footwork-Ford				
DNQ	18	(Italy) Fabrizio Barbazza	AGS-Ford				
DNQ	17	(Italy) Gabriele Tarquini	AGS-Ford				
DNPQ	14	(France) Olivier Grouillard	Fondmetal-Ford				
DNPQ	34	(Italy) Nicola Larini	Lambo-Lamborghini				
DNPQ	35	(Belgium) Eric van de Poele	Lambo-Lamborghini				
DNPQ	31	(Portugal) Pedro Chaves	Coloni-Ford				

== Championship standings after the race ==
Drivers' Championship standings

Pos	Driver	Points
1	(Brazil) Ayrton Senna	51
2	(United Kingdom) Nigel Mansell	33
3	(Italy) Riccardo Patrese	22
4	(France) Alain Prost	21
5	(Brazil) Nelson Piquet	18

Constructors' Championship standings

Pos	Constructor	Points
1	(United Kingdom) McLaren-Honda	67
2	(United Kingdom) Williams-Renault	55
3	(Italy) Ferrari	29
4	(United Kingdom) Benetton-Ford	23
5	(United Kingdom) Tyrrell-Honda	11

- Note: Only the top five positions are included for both sets of standings.

Previous race: 1991 French Grand Prix	FIA Formula One World Championship; 1991 season	Next race: 1991 German Grand Prix
Previous race: 1990 British Grand Prix	British Grand Prix	Next race: 1992 British Grand Prix
