= 1992 German Grand Prix =

- Race 10 of 16 in the 1992 Formula One World Championship

Race details
- Date: 26 July 1992
- Official name: Grosser Mobil 1 Preis von Deutschland
- Location: Hockenheimring; Hockenheim, Baden-Württemberg, Germany
- Course: Permanent racing facility
- Course length: 6.815 km (4.251 miles)
- Distance: 45 laps, 306.675 km (191.313 miles)
- Weather: Dry

Pole position
Driver	(United Kingdom) Nigel Mansell	Williams-Renault
- Time: 1:37.960

Fastest lap
Driver	(Italy) Riccardo Patrese	Williams-Renault
- Time: 1:41.591 on lap 36

Podium
First	(United Kingdom) Nigel Mansell	Williams-Renault
Second	(Brazil) Ayrton Senna	McLaren-Honda
Third	(Germany) Michael Schumacher	Benetton-Ford

The 1992 German Grand Prix was a Formula One motor race held at the Hockenheimring in Hockenheim, Germany on 26 July 1992. It was the tenth race of the 1992 Formula One World Championship.

The 45-lap race was won from pole position by Briton Nigel Mansell, driving a Williams-Renault, with Brazilian Ayrton Senna second in a McLaren-Honda and local driver Michael Schumacher third in a Benetton-Ford.

== Pre-race ==
The Ostkurve chicane was modified for this race from a quick left-right gap into a turning sequence, after there were safety concerns with the chicane the previous year, when Érik Comas had a major accident there in his Ligier.

== Qualifying ==
=== Pre-qualifying report ===
The Friday morning pre-qualifying session again followed the familiar pattern, with the Andrea Moda cars failing to pre-qualify. Gabriele Tarquini was fastest in the session for Fondmetal, just ahead of Larrousse driver Bertrand Gachot. Just over eight tenths of a second slower was Gachot's team-mate Ukyo Katayama, with Fondmetal's Andrea Chiesa, back in the newer GR02, the fourth and final pre-qualifier.

Andrea Moda's Roberto Moreno was fifth fastest as usual, although on this occasion he was much closer to Chiesa, just 0.376 of a second slower despite an engine failure. Perry McCarthy had managed one lap and was slowest, but his time was deleted after he missed a weightcheck and was excluded.

=== Pre-qualifying classification ===
Pos	No	Driver	Constructor	Time	Gap
1	15	(Italy) Gabriele Tarquini	Fondmetal-Ford	1:45.518	—
2	29	(France) Bertrand Gachot	Venturi-Lamborghini	1:45.766	+0.248
3	30	(Japan) Ukyo Katayama	Venturi-Lamborghini	1:46.599	+1.081
4	14	(Switzerland) Andrea Chiesa	Fondmetal-Ford	1:48.502	+2.984
5	34	(Brazil) Roberto Moreno	Andrea Moda-Judd	1:48.878	+3.360
EX	35	(United Kingdom) Perry McCarthy	Andrea Moda-Judd	—	—

=== Qualifying report ===
Nigel Mansell qualified on pole position, ahead of Riccardo Patrese and Ayrton Senna. Stefano Modena, Eric van de Poele, Andrea Chiesa and Damon Hill were the four drivers who did not qualify for the race. For Chiesa, it proved to be the last time he took part in a Grand Prix event, as he was replaced for the next race at the Fondmetal team by van de Poele.

=== Qualifying classification ===
Pos	No	Driver	Constructor	Q1	Q2	Gap
1	5	(United Kingdom) Nigel Mansell	Williams-Renault	1:38.340	1:37.960	
2	6	(Italy) Riccardo Patrese	Williams-Renault	1:40.501	1:38.310	+0.350
3	1	(Brazil) Ayrton Senna	McLaren-Honda	1:40.331	1:39.106	+1.146
4	2	(Austria) Gerhard Berger	McLaren-Honda	1:40.869	1:39.716	+1.756
5	27	(France) Jean Alesi	Ferrari	1:42.563	1:40.959	+2.999
6	19	(Germany) Michael Schumacher	Benetton-Ford	1:42.183	1:41.132	+3.172
7	26	(France) Érik Comas	Ligier-Renault	1:43.696	1:41.942	+3.982
8	25	(Belgium) Thierry Boutsen	Ligier-Renault	1:42.930	1:42.112	+4.152
9	20	(United Kingdom) Martin Brundle	Benetton-Ford	1:43.614	1:42.136	+4.176
10	16	(Austria) Karl Wendlinger	March-Ilmor	1:44.173	1:42.357	+4.397
11	12	(United Kingdom) Johnny Herbert	Lotus-Ford	1:46.164	1:42.645	+4.685
12	28	(Italy) Ivan Capelli	Ferrari	1:43.744	1:42.748	+4.788
13	11	(Finland) Mika Häkkinen	Lotus-Ford	1:44.370	1:42.749	+4.789
14	3	(France) Olivier Grouillard	Tyrrell-Ilmor	1:44.689	1:42.797	+4.837
15	10	(Japan) Aguri Suzuki	Footwork-Mugen-Honda	1:44.359	1:42.838	+4.878
16	30	(Japan) Ukyo Katayama	Venturi-Lamborghini	1:46.406	1:43.079	+5.119
17	9	(Italy) Michele Alboreto	Footwork-Mugen-Honda	1:43.574	1:43.171	+5.211
18	22	(Italy) Pierluigi Martini	Dallara-Ferrari	1:45.099	1:43.556	+5.596
19	15	(Italy) Gabriele Tarquini	Fondmetal-Ford	1:44.661	1:43.777	+5.817
20	4	(Italy) Andrea de Cesaris	Tyrrell-Ilmor	1:43.790	1:44.505	+5.830
21	21	(Finland) JJ Lehto	Dallara-Ferrari	1:45.132	1:43.931	+5.971
22	17	(France) Paul Belmondo	March-Ilmor	1:45.190	1:44.130	+6.170
23	33	(Brazil) Maurício Gugelmin	Jordan-Yamaha	1:45.941	1:44.521	+6.561
24	23	(Italy) Alessandro Zanardi	Minardi-Lamborghini	1:45.788	1:44.593	+6.633
25	29	(France) Bertrand Gachot	Venturi-Lamborghini	no time	1:44.596	+6.636
26	24	(Italy) Gianni Morbidelli	Minardi-Lamborghini	1:45.455	1:44.763	+6.803
27	32	(Italy) Stefano Modena	Jordan-Yamaha	1:46.211	1:45.088	+7.128
28	7	(Belgium) Eric van de Poele	Brabham-Judd	1:47.321	1:45.098	+7.138
29	14	(Switzerland) Andrea Chiesa	Fondmetal-Ford	1:46.362	1:45.459	+7.499
30	8	(United Kingdom) Damon Hill	Brabham-Judd	1:49.843	1:45.871	+7.911

== Race ==
=== Race report ===
At the start, Mansell took an early lead from teammate Patrese, with Senna in third. Mansell made a scheduled pitstop and quickly caught Senna, who chose to run the race without a pitstop. Aguri Suzuki spun off at the Sachs Kurve on lap 2. Ukyo Katayama also retired after spinning off only seven laps later, and Gerhard Berger retired in the pits with electrical problems on lap 17 as he had a long stop for tyres. On lap 19, Mansell cut the corner at the OstKurve chicane, exited faster, and passed Senna on the following straight. Mansell was not penalised. Meanwhile, further back, Ivan Capelli retired with engine trouble on lap 22, as did both the Lotus cars of Mika Häkkinen and Johnny Herbert, retiring with the same problems by lap 24.

On the last lap, Riccardo Patrese spun off whilst trying to pass Ayrton Senna for second position. He was ultimately classified in eighth position. Mansell held on for the race victory, ahead of Senna in second, whose McLaren car ran out of fuel shortly after crossing the finish line and Michael Schumacher in third.

Mansell tied the record from Ayrton Senna in 1988 for most wins in a season with eight, accomplished in only ten races.

Ayrton Senna dropped out of title contention at this race, although it seemed inevitable that only Mansell would be Driver's Champion anyway – he clinched the title at the next race in Hungary.

=== Race classification ===
Pos	No	Driver	Constructor	Laps	Time/Retired	Grid	Points
1	5	(United Kingdom) Nigel Mansell	Williams-Renault	45	1:18:22.032	1	10
2	1	(Brazil) Ayrton Senna	McLaren-Honda	45	+ 4.500	3	6
3	19	(Germany) Michael Schumacher	Benetton-Ford	45	+ 34.462	6	4
4	20	(United Kingdom) Martin Brundle	Benetton-Ford	45	+ 36.959	9	3
5	27	(France) Jean Alesi	Ferrari	45	+ 1:12.607	5	2
6	26	(France) Érik Comas	Ligier-Renault	45	+ 1:36.498	7	1
7	25	(Belgium) Thierry Boutsen	Ligier-Renault	45	+ 1:37.180	8	
8	6	(Italy) Riccardo Patrese	Williams-Renault	44	Spun off	2	
9	9	(Italy) Michele Alboreto	Footwork-Mugen-Honda	44	+ 1 lap	17	
10	21	(Finland) JJ Lehto	Dallara-Ferrari	44	+ 1 lap	21	
11	22	(Italy) Pierluigi Martini	Dallara-Ferrari	44	+ 1 lap	18	
12	24	(Italy) Gianni Morbidelli	Minardi-Lamborghini	44	+ 1 lap	26	
13	17	(France) Paul Belmondo	March-Ilmor	44	+ 1 lap	22	
14	29	(France) Bertrand Gachot	Venturi-Lamborghini	44	+ 1 lap	25	
15	33	(Brazil) Maurício Gugelmin	Jordan-Yamaha	43	+ 2 laps	23	
16	16	(Austria) Karl Wendlinger	March-Ilmor	42	+ 3 laps	10	
Ret	15	(Italy) Gabriele Tarquini	Fondmetal-Ford	33	Engine	19	
Ret	4	(Italy) Andrea de Cesaris	Tyrrell-Ilmor	25	Engine	20	
Ret	12	(United Kingdom) Johnny Herbert	Lotus-Ford	23	Engine	11	
Ret	28	(Italy) Ivan Capelli	Ferrari	21	Engine	12	
Ret	11	(Finland) Mika Häkkinen	Lotus-Ford	21	Engine	13	
Ret	2	(Austria) Gerhard Berger	McLaren-Honda	16	Electrical	4	
Ret	3	(France) Olivier Grouillard	Tyrrell-Ilmor	8	Engine	14	
Ret	30	(Japan) Ukyo Katayama	Venturi-Lamborghini	8	Spun off	16	
Ret	10	(Japan) Aguri Suzuki	Footwork-Mugen-Honda	1	Spun off	15	
Ret	23	(Italy) Alessandro Zanardi	Minardi-Lamborghini	1	Gearbox	24	
DNQ	32	(Italy) Stefano Modena	Jordan-Yamaha				
DNQ	7	(Belgium) Eric van de Poele	Brabham-Judd				
DNQ	14	(Switzerland) Andrea Chiesa	Fondmetal-Ford				
DNQ	8	(United Kingdom) Damon Hill	Brabham-Judd				
DNPQ	34	(Brazil) Roberto Moreno	Andrea Moda-Judd				
EX	35	(United Kingdom) Perry McCarthy	Andrea Moda-Judd				

== Championship standings after the race ==
Drivers' Championship standings

Pos	Driver	Points
1	(United Kingdom) Nigel Mansell	86
2	(Italy) Riccardo Patrese	40
3	(Germany) Michael Schumacher	33
4	(Brazil) Ayrton Senna	24
5	(Austria) Gerhard Berger	20

Constructors' Championship standings

Pos	Constructor	Points
1	(United Kingdom) Williams-Renault	126
2	(United Kingdom) Benetton-Ford	49
3	(United Kingdom) McLaren-Honda	44
4	(Italy) Ferrari	15
5	(United Kingdom) Lotus-Ford	7

- Note: Only the top five positions are included for both sets of standings.

Previous race: 1992 British Grand Prix	FIA Formula One World Championship; 1992 season	Next race: 1992 Hungarian Grand Prix
Previous race: 1991 German Grand Prix	German Grand Prix	Next race: 1993 German Grand Prix
