= 1991 Canadian Grand Prix =

- Race 5 of 16 in the 1991 Formula One World Championship

Race details
- Date: 2 June 1991
- Location: Circuit Gilles Villeneuve; Montreal, Quebec, Canada
- Course: Temporary street circuit
- Course length: 4.430 km (2.753 miles)
- Distance: 69 laps, 305.670 km (189.935 miles)
- Weather: Mild with temperatures approaching 25 °C (77 °F); Wind speeds up to 12 km/h (7.5 mph)

Pole position
Driver	(Italy) Riccardo Patrese	Williams-Renault
- Time: 1:19.837

Fastest lap
Driver	(United Kingdom) Nigel Mansell	Williams-Renault
- Time: 1:22.385 on lap 65

Podium
First	(Brazil) Nelson Piquet	Benetton-Ford
Second	(Italy) Stefano Modena	Tyrrell-Honda
Third	(Italy) Riccardo Patrese	Williams-Renault
- Lap leaders: No race-code specified

The 1991 Canadian Grand Prix was a Formula One motor race held at Circuit Gilles Villeneuve on 2 June 1991. It was the fifth race of the 1991 FIA Formula One World Championship.

The 69-lap race was won by Nelson Piquet, driving a Benetton-Ford. Piquet took the 23rd and final win of his F1 career after old rival Nigel Mansell, driving a Williams-Renault, suddenly stopped halfway round the last lap while leading by almost a minute. Stefano Modena took second in a Tyrrell-Honda, while Mansell's team-mate Riccardo Patrese was third, having started from pole position. Piquet's win was the first for a car using Pirelli tyres since the 1986 Mexican Grand Prix when Gerhard Berger took Benetton's first ever Grand Prix victory and the last for the famed BMW turbo.

This was the last win for Pirelli as a tyre supplier in Formula One until the 2011 Australian Grand Prix.

== Pre-race ==
Between the Monaco and Canadian Grands Prix, Cesare Fiorio had been fired as team manager of Ferrari and had been replaced by Piero Ferrari. Meanwhile, John Barnard had left as Benetton's technical director; he was replaced by Gordon Kimball (father of future IndyCar driver Charlie Kimball).

On the driver front, Julian Bailey's funding ran out and he was replaced at Lotus by Johnny Herbert, who subsequently failed to qualify for the race, while Alex Caffi was out of action for Footwork as a result of injuries sustained in a road accident. His place was taken by Stefan Johansson.

== Qualifying ==
=== Pre-qualifying report ===
As at the previous Grand Prix in Monaco, the pre-qualifying session was dominated by the Scuderia Italia Dallara cars, and the Jordans. With Dallara's Emanuele Pirro fastest ahead of his team-mate JJ Lehto, followed by Jordan's Andrea de Cesaris and Bertrand Gachot, there was over a second between the four pre-qualifiers and the rest.

Those who failed to progress to the main qualifying sessions included Olivier Grouillard, fifth fastest for Fondmetal, his best result of the season so far. The Modena team was starting to run into financial difficulties, and the performance of their Lambo cars was also slipping, as Nicola Larini and Eric van de Poele ended the session down in sixth and seventh positions. Slowest was Pedro Chaves in the Coloni, despite a new Hart-prepared Cosworth DFR engine.

=== Pre-qualifying classification ===
Pos	No	Driver	Constructor	Time	Gap
1	21	(Italy) Emanuele Pirro	Dallara-Judd	1:23.244	—
2	22	(Finland) JJ Lehto	Dallara-Judd	1:23.480	+0.236
3	33	(Italy) Andrea de Cesaris	Jordan-Ford	1:23.672	+0.428
4	32	(Belgium) Bertrand Gachot	Jordan-Ford	1:23.719	+0.475
5	14	(France) Olivier Grouillard	Fondmetal-Ford	1:24.795	+1.551
6	34	(Italy) Nicola Larini	Lambo-Lamborghini	1:25.736	+2.492
7	35	(Belgium) Eric van de Poele	Lambo-Lamborghini	1:26.900	+3.656
8	31	(Portugal) Pedro Chaves	Coloni-Ford	1:34.475	+11.231

=== Qualifying report ===
In practice Riccardo Patrese had a huge accident, walking away unhurt. In the qualifying sessions, Patrese took pole position from team-mate Mansell, out-qualifying him for the fifth straight race. Senna was third followed by Prost, Moreno, Berger, Alesi, Piquet, Modena, and Pirro.

=== Qualifying classification ===
Pos	No	Driver	Constructor	Q1	Q2	Gap
1	6	(Italy) Riccardo Patrese	Williams-Renault	1:37.593	1:19.837	—
2	5	(United Kingdom) Nigel Mansell	Williams-Renault	1:35.065	1:20.225	+0.388
3	1	(Brazil) Ayrton Senna	McLaren-Honda	1:35.843	1:20.318	+0.481
4	27	(France) Alain Prost	Ferrari	1:36.003	1:20.656	+0.819
5	19	(Brazil) Roberto Moreno	Benetton-Ford	1:35.897	1:20.686	+0.849
6	2	(Austria) Gerhard Berger	McLaren-Honda	1:38.223	1:20.916	+1.079
7	28	(France) Jean Alesi	Ferrari	1:35.257	1:21.227	+1.390
8	20	(Brazil) Nelson Piquet	Benetton-Ford	1:37.354	1:21.241	+1.404
9	4	(Italy) Stefano Modena	Tyrrell-Honda	1:38.218	1:21.298	+1.461
10	21	(Italy) Emanuele Pirro	Dallara-Judd	1:39.017	1:21.864	+2.027
11	33	(Italy) Andrea de Cesaris	Jordan-Ford	1:37.097	1:22.154	+2.317
12	3	(Japan) Satoru Nakajima	Tyrrell-Honda	1:41.100	1:22.262	+2.425
13	16	(Italy) Ivan Capelli	Leyton House-Ilmor	1:40.906	1:22.443	+2.606
14	32	(Belgium) Bertrand Gachot	Jordan-Ford	1:38.383	1:22.596	+2.759
15	24	(Italy) Gianni Morbidelli	Minardi-Ferrari	1:39.780	1:22.993	+3.156
16	25	(Belgium) Thierry Boutsen	Ligier-Lamborghini	1:38.517	1:23.040	+3.203
17	22	(Finland) JJ Lehto	Dallara-Judd	1:38.435	1:23.040	+3.203
18	23	(Italy) Pierluigi Martini	Minardi-Ferrari	1:37.864	1:23.125	+3.288
19	29	(France) Éric Bernard	Lola-Ford	1:38.013	1:23.260	+3.423
20	7	(United Kingdom) Martin Brundle	Brabham-Yamaha	1:38.405	1:23.516	+3.679
21	9	(Italy) Michele Alboreto	Footwork-Porsche	1:41.196	1:23.529	+3.692
22	30	(Japan) Aguri Suzuki	Lola-Ford	1:39.696	1:23.585	+3.748
23	15	(Brazil) Maurício Gugelmin	Leyton House-Ilmor	1:38.689	1:23.650	+3.813
24	11	(Finland) Mika Häkkinen	Lotus-Judd	1:42.900	1:23.923	+4.086
25	10	(Sweden) Stefan Johansson	Footwork-Porsche	1:49.019	1:24.433	+4.596
26	26	(France) Érik Comas	Ligier-Lamborghini	1:39.670	1:24.460	+4.623
27	18	(Italy) Fabrizio Barbazza	AGS-Ford	1:40.555	1:24.491	+4.654
28	17	(Italy) Gabriele Tarquini	AGS-Ford	1:41.946	1:24.653	+4.816
29	8	(United Kingdom) Mark Blundell	Brabham-Yamaha	1:39.897	1:24.661	+4.824
30	12	(United Kingdom) Johnny Herbert	Lotus-Judd	1:39.113	1:24.732	+4.895

== Race ==
=== Race report ===
At the start, Mansell got away well and led Patrese, Senna, Prost, Berger, and Moreno. Berger went out on lap 4 with electronics problems, while Aguri Suzuki retired when his Lola caught fire. Moreno was out on lap 10 when he spun off, while Prost was suffering from gearbox problems. The Frenchman had managed to hold on while he engaged in a battle with teammate Alesi and Piquet's Benetton.

Mansell led Patrese and Senna on lap 25 when Senna retired, leaving Mansell and Patrese a long way ahead of the Alesi–Prost–Piquet battle. This ended Senna's thus far perfect season, capping his winning streak at 4. Prost retired shortly after with a gearbox failure on lap 27 and Ferrari's misery was compounded on lap 34 when Alesi's engine blew up.

The Williams drivers were now well ahead of the pack, but Piquet closed on Patrese, the Italian suffering from gearbox troubles of his own. In the late stages Patrese was passed by Stefano Modena in the Tyrrell. On the last lap, Mansell led from Piquet, Modena, Patrese, de Cesaris, and Gachot when he suddenly slowed to a halt at the hairpin. There were rumours that Mansell had failed to change gear for the hairpin and stalled the car, or that he had turned off the engine accidentally while waving to the crowd during the final lap. Mansell denied this, saying that the gearbox had gone into neutral as he shifted down, and Williams said that the car had suffered an electrical failure. When the car was returned to the pits, the engine was re-fired and the gearbox worked perfectly. Piquet thus took an unexpected victory for Benetton at the expense of his old rival Mansell, who was classified sixth. Jordan's five points, their first in Formula One, meant that they would no longer have to pre-qualify when the draw was reshuffled at the halfway point of the season.

The race was Nelson Piquet's 23rd and last win in Formula One, and Stefano Modena's second and last podium finish.

=== Race classification ===
Pos	No	Driver	Constructor	Tyre	Laps	Time/Retired	Grid	Points
1	20	(Brazil) Nelson Piquet	Benetton-Ford	P	69	1:38:51.490	8	10
2	4	(Italy) Stefano Modena	Tyrrell-Honda	P	69	+ 31.832	9	6
3	6	(Italy) Riccardo Patrese	Williams-Renault	G	69	+ 42.217	1	4
4	33	(Italy) Andrea de Cesaris	Jordan-Ford	G	69	+ 1:20.210	11	3
5	32	(Belgium) Bertrand Gachot	Jordan-Ford	G	69	+ 1:22.351	14	2
6	5	(United Kingdom) Nigel Mansell	Williams-Renault	G	68	Electrics	2	1
7	23	(Italy) Pierluigi Martini	Minardi-Ferrari	G	68	+ 1 lap	18	
8	26	(France) Érik Comas	Ligier-Lamborghini	G	68	+ 1 lap	26	
9	21	(Italy) Emanuele Pirro	Dallara-Judd	P	68	+ 1 lap	10	
10	3	(Japan) Satoru Nakajima	Tyrrell-Honda	P	67	+ 2 laps	12	
Ret	15	(Brazil) Maurício Gugelmin	Leyton House-Ilmor	G	61	Engine	23	
Ret	22	(Finland) JJ Lehto	Dallara-Judd	P	50	Engine	17	
Ret	10	(Sweden) Stefan Johansson	Footwork-Porsche	G	48	Throttle	25	
Ret	16	(Italy) Ivan Capelli	Leyton House-Ilmor	G	42	Engine	13	
Ret	28	(France) Jean Alesi	Ferrari	G	34	Engine	7	
Ret	29	(France) Éric Bernard	Lola-Ford	G	29	Gearbox	19	
Ret	27	(France) Alain Prost	Ferrari	G	27	Gearbox	4	
Ret	25	(Belgium) Thierry Boutsen	Ligier-Lamborghini	G	27	Engine	16	
Ret	1	(Brazil) Ayrton Senna	McLaren-Honda	G	25	Alternator	3	
Ret	11	(Finland) Mika Häkkinen	Lotus-Judd	G	21	Spun off	24	
Ret	7	(United Kingdom) Martin Brundle	Brabham-Yamaha	P	21	Engine	20	
Ret	24	(Italy) Gianni Morbidelli	Minardi-Ferrari	G	20	Spun off	15	
Ret	19	(Brazil) Roberto Moreno	Benetton-Ford	P	10	Suspension	5	
Ret	2	(Austria) Gerhard Berger	McLaren-Honda	G	4	Injection	6	
Ret	30	(Japan) Aguri Suzuki	Lola-Ford	G	3	Fuel leak	22	
Ret	9	(Italy) Michele Alboreto	Footwork-Porsche	G	2	Throttle	21	
DNQ	18	(Italy) Fabrizio Barbazza	AGS-Ford	G				
DNQ	17	(Italy) Gabriele Tarquini	AGS-Ford	G				
DNQ	8	(United Kingdom) Mark Blundell	Brabham-Yamaha	P				
DNQ	12	(United Kingdom) Johnny Herbert	Lotus-Judd	G				
DNPQ	14	(France) Olivier Grouillard	Fondmetal-Ford	G				
DNPQ	34	(Italy) Nicola Larini	Lambo-Lamborghini	G				
DNPQ	35	(Belgium) Eric van de Poele	Lambo-Lamborghini	G				
DNPQ	31	(Portugal) Pedro Chaves	Coloni-Ford	G				

== Championship standings after the race ==
Drivers' Championship standings

	Pos	Driver	Points
	1	(Brazil) Ayrton Senna	40
4	2	(Brazil) Nelson Piquet	16
1	3	(France) Alain Prost	11
	4	(Italy) Riccardo Patrese	10
2	5	(Austria) Gerhard Berger	10

Constructors' Championship standings

	Pos	Constructor	Points
	1	(United Kingdom) McLaren-Honda	50
2	2	(United Kingdom) Benetton-Ford	19
	3	(United Kingdom) Williams-Renault	17
2	4	(Italy) Ferrari	16
	5	(United Kingdom) Tyrrell-Honda	11

- Note: Only the top five positions are included for both sets of standings.

Previous race: 1991 Monaco Grand Prix	FIA Formula One World Championship; 1991 season	Next race: 1991 Mexican Grand Prix
Previous race: 1990 Canadian Grand Prix	Canadian Grand Prix	Next race: 1992 Canadian Grand Prix
