= Gabriele Rumi =

Formula One team owner

- Born: 4 September 1939; Palazzolo sull'Oglio, Kingdom of Italy
- Died: 21 May 2001 (aged 61); Palazzolo sull'Oglio, Italy
- Employer: Fondmetal

Gabriele Rumi (4 September 1939 – 21 May 2001) was an Italian Formula One team owner. He was born in Palazzolo sull'Oglio.

== Career ==
=== Early career ===
Rumi's grandfather Gabriele Rumi opened an iron foundry in Brescia. Rumi took over the running of the business in 1961. Within the decade, Rumi visited the Monte Bondone hillclimb event near Trento. In 1970 Rumi decided to diversify the business into the light alloy sector, to produce parts for engines and other uses for motor vehicles. In 1972 he started his own alloy wheel business, Fondmetal.

=== Formula One ===
Rumi began his involvement in Formula One motor racing when he sponsored fellow countryman Piercarlo Ghinzani. In 1990, Rumi bought the Osella team and renamed the team Fondmetal the following year. Fondmetal was shut down at the end of 1992 due to the high costs of running the team. However, the company remained in Formula One by leasing out their own wind tunnel to other competitors. In 1996, Rumi returned to the position of a team owner when he was a member of a consortium which brought Minardi and became the team's majority shareholder in 1997. At the end of 2000, Rumi sold his shares in Minardi to the Pan-American Sports Network who sponsored their driver Gastón Mazzacane who later sold the team to Australian businessman Paul Stoddart.

== Death ==
Rumi died of cancer on 21 May 2001 aged 61.
