= 1992 Portuguese Grand Prix =

- Race 14 of 16 in the 1992 Formula One World Championship
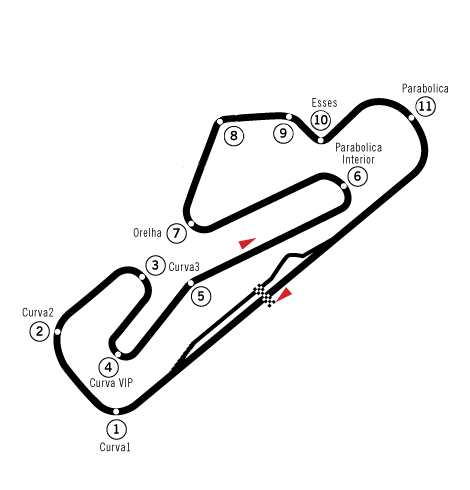

Race details
- Date: 27 September 1992
- Official name: XXI Grande Premio SG Gigante de Portugal
- Location: Autódromo do Estoril, Estoril, Portugal
- Course: Permanent racing facility
- Course length: 4.349 km (2.703 miles)
- Distance: 71 laps, 308.779 km (191.913 miles)
- Weather: Dry, sunny, windy

Pole position
Driver	(United Kingdom) Nigel Mansell	Williams-Renault
- Time: 1:13.041

Fastest lap
Driver	(Brazil) Ayrton Senna	McLaren-Honda
- Time: 1:16.272 on lap 66

Podium
First	(United Kingdom) Nigel Mansell	Williams-Renault
Second	(Austria) Gerhard Berger	McLaren-Honda
Third	(Brazil) Ayrton Senna	McLaren-Honda

The 1992 Portuguese Grand Prix was a Formula One motor race held at Autódromo do Estoril on 27 September 1992. It was the fourteenth race of the 1992 Formula One World Championship.

The 71-lap race was won from pole position by Briton Nigel Mansell, driving a Williams-Renault. In the process, Mansell set new records for the most wins (nine) and the most points (108) in one season. McLaren-Honda drivers, Austrian Gerhard Berger and Brazilian Ayrton Senna, finished second and third respectively.

== Pre-race ==
The Fondmetal team did not arrive in Estoril for the race, suffering financial problems. Team boss Gabriele Rumi attempted to bring in paydriver Giuseppe Bugatti to help ease the team's cashflow problems but this was not enough to allow the team to race. Although they hoped at the time to return for the final two races of the season in Japan and Australia, they ultimately proved unable to do so. This was the third race in succession where a team exited Formula One, after Brabham and Andrea Moda at the previous two races. Brabham had also hoped to return as the team was put up for sale, but before this weekend their full withdrawal was announced.

Fondmetal's absence meant that there were only 26 cars on the entry list, so this Grand Prix was the first since 1987 in which all cars automatically qualified for the race, regardless of qualifying lap times.

== Qualifying ==
=== Qualifying report ===
The top six on the grid lined up in pairs, with the Williams, McLaren and Benetton drivers occupying the first three rows. Nigel Mansell took pole from Riccardo Patrese, with Ayrton Senna, Gerhard Berger, Michael Schumacher and Martin Brundle lining up behind.

=== Qualifying classification ===
Pos	No	Driver	Constructor	Q1	Q2	Gap
1	5	(United Kingdom) Nigel Mansell	Williams-Renault	1:13.041	1:13.961	
2	6	(Italy) Riccardo Patrese	Williams-Renault	1:13.672	1:14.305	+0.631
3	1	(Brazil) Ayrton Senna	McLaren-Honda	1:15.343	1:14.258	+1.217
4	2	(Austria) Gerhard Berger	McLaren-Honda	1:15.117	1:15.068	+2.027
5	19	(Germany) Michael Schumacher	Benetton-Ford	1:15.356	1:15.890	+2.315
6	20	(United Kingdom) Martin Brundle	Benetton-Ford	1:16.796	1:16.084	+3.043
7	11	(Finland) Mika Häkkinen	Lotus-Ford	1:16.173	1:16.213	+3.132
8	9	(Italy) Michele Alboreto	Footwork-Mugen-Honda	1:16.282	1:17.109	+3.241
9	12	(United Kingdom) Johnny Herbert	Lotus-Ford	1:16.755	1:16.628	+3.587
10	27	(France) Jean Alesi	Ferrari	1:16.937	1:16.884	+3.843
11	25	(Belgium) Thierry Boutsen	Ligier-Renault	1:17.332	1:16.930	+3.889
12	4	(Italy) Andrea de Cesaris	Tyrrell-Ilmor	1:17.356	1:17.240	+4.199
13	29	(France) Bertrand Gachot	Venturi-Lamborghini	1:17.624	1:17.250	+4.209
14	26	(France) Érik Comas	Ligier-Renault	1:17.384	1:17.264	+4.223
15	3	(France) Olivier Grouillard	Tyrrell-Ilmor	1:17.512	1:17.277	+4.236
16	28	(Italy) Ivan Capelli	Ferrari	1:18.030	1:17.287	+4.246
17	10	(Japan) Aguri Suzuki	Footwork-Mugen-Honda	1:17.361	1:17.675	+4.320
18	24	(Italy) Gianni Morbidelli	Minardi-Lamborghini	1:17.973	1:17.387	+4.346
19	21	(Finland) JJ Lehto	Dallara-Ferrari	1:17.847	1:17.474	+4.433
20	33	(Brazil) Maurício Gugelmin	Jordan-Yamaha	1:17.949	1:17.631	+4.590
21	22	(Italy) Pierluigi Martini	Dallara-Ferrari	1:17.661	1:18.676	+4.620
22	16	(Austria) Karl Wendlinger	March-Ilmor	1:18.060	1:18.445	+5.019
23	17	(Italy) Emanuele Naspetti	March-Ilmor	1:18.092	1:18.531	+5.051
24	32	(Italy) Stefano Modena	Jordan-Yamaha	1:18.318	1:19.314	+5.277
25	30	(Japan) Ukyo Katayama	Venturi-Lamborghini	1:36.224	1:18.592	+5.551
26	23	(Brazil) Christian Fittipaldi	Minardi-Lamborghini	1:18.615	1:18.823	+5.574

== Race ==
=== Race report ===
The race is often remembered for the accident between Berger and Mansell's Williams team-mate Riccardo Patrese. Intending to make a pit stop, Berger moved towards the right side of the track at the beginning of the start/finish straight, with Patrese following in his slipstream. Failing to realise Berger's intentions, Patrese swerved to avoid him, but his right front wheel hit Berger's left rear and the Williams was launched into the air, almost hitting a pedestrian bridge over the track. Patrese escaped the accident shaken but unhurt, and neither driver was punished by the stewards. The debris from the crash, however, caused numerous other incidents, with Michael Schumacher and Pierluigi Martini suffering punctures, and JJ Lehto suffering slight injury as the driveshaft of the Williams went through the undertray of his Dallara, hitting him on the leg and eventually being forced to retire after 51 laps.

This race was the last time a Honda-powered car set the fastest lap until Fernando Alonso repeated the achievement in the 2016 Italian Grand Prix, and the last time McLaren would score a double points result with Honda engines until the 2015 Hungarian Grand Prix.

=== Race classification ===
Pos	No	Driver	Constructor	Laps	Time/Retired	Grid	Points
1	5	(United Kingdom) Nigel Mansell	Williams-Renault	71	1:34:46.659	1	10
2	2	(Austria) Gerhard Berger	McLaren-Honda	71	+ 37.533	4	6
3	1	(Brazil) Ayrton Senna	McLaren-Honda	70	+ 1 lap	3	4
4	20	(United Kingdom) Martin Brundle	Benetton-Ford	70	+ 1 lap	6	3
5	11	(Finland) Mika Häkkinen	Lotus-Ford	70	+ 1 lap	7	2
6	9	(Italy) Michele Alboreto	Footwork-Mugen-Honda	70	+ 1 lap	8	1
7	19	(Germany) Michael Schumacher	Benetton-Ford	69	+ 2 laps	5	
8	25	(Belgium) Thierry Boutsen	Ligier-Renault	69	+ 2 laps	11	
9	4	(Italy) Andrea de Cesaris	Tyrrell-Ilmor	69	+ 2 laps	12	
10	10	(Japan) Aguri Suzuki	Footwork-Mugen-Honda	68	+ 3 laps	17	
11	17	(Italy) Emanuele Naspetti	March-Ilmor	68	+ 3 laps	23	
12	23	(Brazil) Christian Fittipaldi	Minardi-Lamborghini	68	+ 3 laps	26	
13	32	(Italy) Stefano Modena	Jordan-Yamaha	68	+ 3 laps	24	
14	24	(Italy) Gianni Morbidelli	Minardi-Lamborghini	68	+ 3 laps	18	
Ret	21	(Finland) JJ Lehto	Dallara-Ferrari	51	Physical	19	
Ret	16	(Austria) Karl Wendlinger	March-Ilmor	48	Gearbox	22	
Ret	26	(France) Érik Comas	Ligier-Renault	47	Engine	14	
Ret	30	(Japan) Ukyo Katayama	Venturi-Lamborghini	46	Spun off	25	
Ret	6	(Italy) Riccardo Patrese	Williams-Renault	43	Collision	2	
Ret	22	(Italy) Pierluigi Martini	Dallara-Ferrari	43	Puncture	21	
Ret	28	(Italy) Ivan Capelli	Ferrari	34	Engine	16	
Ret	3	(France) Olivier Grouillard	Tyrrell-Ilmor	27	Gearbox	15	
Ret	29	(France) Bertrand Gachot	Venturi-Lamborghini	25	Engine	13	
Ret	33	(Brazil) Maurício Gugelmin	Jordan-Yamaha	19	Electrical	20	
Ret	27	(France) Jean Alesi	Ferrari	12	Spun off	10	
Ret	12	(United Kingdom) Johnny Herbert	Lotus-Ford	2	Accident	9	

== Championship standings after the race ==
Drivers' Championship standings

	Pos	Driver	Points
	1	(United Kingdom) **Nigel Mansell**	108
1	2	(Brazil) Ayrton Senna	50
1	3	(Germany) Michael Schumacher	47
	4	(Italy) Riccardo Patrese	46
	5	(Austria) Gerhard Berger	33

Constructors' Championship standings

	Pos	Constructor	Points
	1	(United Kingdom) **Williams-Renault**	154
1	2	(United Kingdom) McLaren-Honda	83
1	3	(United Kingdom) Benetton-Ford	77
	4	(Italy) Ferrari	16
	5	(United Kingdom) Lotus-Ford	13

- Note: Only the top five positions are included for both sets of standings.
- **Bold text** indicates the 1992 World Champions.

Previous race: 1992 Italian Grand Prix	FIA Formula One World Championship; 1992 season	Next race: 1992 Japanese Grand Prix
Previous race: 1991 Portuguese Grand Prix	Portuguese Grand Prix	Next race: 1993 Portuguese Grand Prix
