= 1992 Canadian Grand Prix =

- Race 7 of 16 in the 1992 Formula One World Championship

Race details
- Date: 14 June 1992
- Official name: XXX Grand Prix Molson du Canada
- Location: Circuit Gilles Villeneuve; Montreal, Quebec, Canada
- Course: Temporary street circuit
- Course length: 4.430 km (2.753 miles)
- Distance: 69 laps, 305.670 km (189.935 miles)
- Weather: Dry with temperatures reaching up to 25 °C (77 °F); Wind speeds up to 14 km/h (8.7 mph)

Pole position
Driver	(Brazil) Ayrton Senna	McLaren-Honda
- Time: 1:19.775

Fastest lap
Driver	(Austria) Gerhard Berger	McLaren-Honda
- Time: 1:22.325 on lap 61

Podium
First	(Austria) Gerhard Berger	McLaren-Honda
Second	(Germany) Michael Schumacher	Benetton-Ford
Third	(France) Jean Alesi	Ferrari

The 1992 Canadian Grand Prix was a Formula One motor race held at Circuit Gilles Villeneuve, Montreal on 14 June 1992. It was the seventh race of the 1992 Formula One World Championship.

The 69-lap race was won by Austrian driver Gerhard Berger, driving a McLaren-Honda, after he started from fourth position. Berger's Brazilian teammate, Ayrton Senna, took pole position and led until he suffered an electrical failure on lap 38, while Drivers' Championship leader, Briton Nigel Mansell, spun off on lap 15 attempting to overtake Senna. German Michael Schumacher finished second in a Benetton-Ford, with Frenchman Jean Alesi third in a Ferrari.

== Qualifying ==
=== Pre-qualifying report ===
In the Friday morning pre-qualifying session, the Footwork of Michele Alboreto was fastest for the third consecutive Grand Prix. He was less than three tenths of a second faster than Larrousse driver Bertrand Gachot, with Gachot's team-mate Ukyo Katayama nearly two seconds slower in third. The fourth and final pre-qualifier was Andrea Chiesa in the Fondmetal, nearly 4.5 seconds off Alboreto's pace.

The Andrea Moda team failed to capitalise on the improvement made at the last race in Monaco, as both cars failed to pre-qualify. Although the team and drivers had arrived at the circuit, their Judd engines had not, having been withheld by the freight forwarding agent for non-payment of debts. The team were able to borrow an engine from the Brabham team, which allowed Roberto Moreno to take part in the session, but he was nowhere near the required pace. There was no engine for Perry McCarthy's car, so he did not participate.

=== Pre-qualifying classification ===
Pos	No	Driver	Constructor	Time	Gap
1	9	(Italy) Michele Alboreto	Footwork-Mugen-Honda	1:25.068	—
2	29	(France) Bertrand Gachot	Venturi-Lamborghini	1:25.358	+0.290
3	30	(Japan) Ukyo Katayama	Venturi-Lamborghini	1:27.309	+2.241
4	14	(Switzerland) Andrea Chiesa	Fondmetal-Ford	1:29.562	+4.494
5	34	(Brazil) Roberto Moreno	Andrea Moda-Judd	1:43.557	+18.489

=== Qualifying report ===
Qualifying produced a surprise as Ayrton Senna took pole position in his McLaren while championship leader Nigel Mansell could only manage third, behind Williams teammate Riccardo Patrese. This would turn out to be the only non-Williams pole of 1992, and one of only two not taken by Mansell that season. Rumours suggested that the English driver was under stress, as Williams were negotiating with Alain Prost for 1993.

Gerhard Berger took fourth in the other McLaren, followed by Michael Schumacher in the Benetton. Johnny Herbert impressed in the Lotus and took sixth, ahead of Martin Brundle in the second Benetton. The top ten was completed by the Ferraris of Jean Alesi and Ivan Capelli, and Mika Häkkinen in the second Lotus.

=== Qualifying classification ===
Pos	No	Driver	Constructor	Q1	Q2	Gap
1	1	(Brazil) Ayrton Senna	McLaren-Honda	1:19.775	1:20.590	—
2	6	(Italy) Riccardo Patrese	Williams-Renault	1:19.872	1:21.075	+0.097
3	5	(United Kingdom) Nigel Mansell	Williams-Renault	1:20.157	1:19.948	+0.173
4	2	(Austria) Gerhard Berger	McLaren-Honda	1:20.145	1:21.038	+0.370
5	19	(Germany) Michael Schumacher	Benetton-Ford	1:20.456	1:21.045	+0.681
6	12	(United Kingdom) Johnny Herbert	Lotus-Ford	1:21.645	1:23.043	+1.870
7	20	(United Kingdom) Martin Brundle	Benetton-Ford	1:22.408	1:21.738	+1.963
8	27	(France) Jean Alesi	Ferrari	1:21.777	1:22.033	+2.002
9	28	(Italy) Ivan Capelli	Ferrari	1:22.297	1:26.259	+2.522
10	11	(Finland) Mika Häkkinen	Lotus-Ford	1:22.360	1:22.787	+2.585
11	30	(Japan) Ukyo Katayama	Venturi-Lamborghini	1:22.510	1:33.438	+2.735
12	16	(Austria) Karl Wendlinger	March-Ilmor	1:22.778	1:22.566	+2.791
13	24	(Italy) Gianni Morbidelli	Minardi-Lamborghini	1:22.594	1:23.028	+2.819
14	4	(Italy) Andrea de Cesaris	Tyrrell-Ilmor	1:22.635	1:23.948	+2.860
15	22	(Italy) Pierluigi Martini	Dallara-Ferrari	1:24.144	1:22.850	+3.075
16	9	(Italy) Michele Alboreto	Footwork-Mugen-Honda	1:22.878	1:23.022	+3.103
17	32	(Italy) Stefano Modena	Jordan-Yamaha	1:23.023	1:23.572	+3.248
18	15	(Italy) Gabriele Tarquini	Fondmetal-Ford	1:24.281	1:23.063	+3.288
19	29	(France) Bertrand Gachot	Venturi-Lamborghini	1:23.410	1:23.138	+3.363
20	17	(France) Paul Belmondo	March-Ilmor	1:24.852	1:23.189	+3.414
21	25	(Belgium) Thierry Boutsen	Ligier-Renault	1:23.425	1:23.203	+3.428
22	26	(France) Érik Comas	Ligier-Renault	1:23.537	1:23.212	+3.437
23	21	(Finland) JJ Lehto	Dallara-Ferrari	1:23.793	1:23.249	+3.474
24	33	(Brazil) Maurício Gugelmin	Jordan-Yamaha	1:23.431	1:24.640	+3.656
25	23	(Brazil) Christian Fittipaldi	Minardi-Lamborghini	1:23.759	1:23.433	+3.658
26	3	(France) Olivier Grouillard	Tyrrell-Ilmor	1:23.469	1:24.060	+3.694
27	10	(Japan) Aguri Suzuki	Footwork-Mugen-Honda	1:23.958	1:23.721	+3.946
28	7	(Belgium) Eric van de Poele	Brabham-Judd	1:24.858	1:24.499	+4.724
29	14	(Switzerland) Andrea Chiesa	Fondmetal-Ford	1:25.044	1:25.612	+5.837
30	8	(United Kingdom) Damon Hill	Brabham-Judd	1:26.641	1:25.812	+6.037

== Race ==
=== Race report ===
Stefano Modena started from the back of the grid after his car failed to start.

At the start Senna took the lead from the two Williams-Renaults with Mansell getting ahead of Patrese then Berger, Schumacher, Herbert and Brundle. For the first 13 laps the top eight followed in close attention until next lap 14 Mansell tried to overtake Senna at the last chicane but the car ended off track and spun and came to a stop on the main straight. The Williams driver was out of the race and accusing Senna of pushing him off. As this was happening Berger had passed Patrese to make it a McLaren 1-2. On lap 18 Capelli crashed hard into the wall on the exit of turn four. Johnny Herbert retired on lap 34 with clutch problems and team-mate Mika Häkkinen retired one lap later when his gearbox failed meaning disaster for Lotus after both cars qualified in the top ten. On lap 37 Senna retired from the lead with electrical problems. Berger had by now pulled a couple of seconds lead on Patrese who was being chased by Brundle after the Englishman had taken advantage of Schumacher getting stuck behind Morbidelli's Minardi while lapping him. A few laps later Patrese was out as his gearbox failed making this the first double retirement for Williams. Brundle now chased after Berger and set fastest lap but then was also forced to retire with transmission problems with what was subsequently his fifth and final retirement of the season. Berger was in comfortable lead followed by Schumacher. Katayama was driving a good race but had to retire from fifth on lap 61 when his engine expired. Wendlinger finished fourth to score his first points in Formula One as well as the last points for the March team. With sixth place for Érik Comas, Ligier scored their first points since the 1989 French Grand Prix almost three years prior.

=== Race classification ===
Pos	No	Driver	Constructor	Laps	Time/Retired	Grid	Points
1	2	(Austria) Gerhard Berger	McLaren-Honda	69	1:37:08.299	4	10
2	19	(Germany) Michael Schumacher	Benetton-Ford	69	+ 12.401	5	6
3	27	(France) Jean Alesi	Ferrari	69	+ 1:07.327	8	4
4	16	(Austria) Karl Wendlinger	March-Ilmor	68	+ 1 lap	12	3
5	4	(Italy) Andrea de Cesaris	Tyrrell-Ilmor	68	+ 1 lap	14	2
6	26	(France) Érik Comas	Ligier-Renault	68	+ 1 lap	22	1
7	9	(Italy) Michele Alboreto	Footwork-Mugen-Honda	68	+ 1 lap	16	
8	22	(Italy) Pierluigi Martini	Dallara-Ferrari	68	+ 1 lap	15	
9	21	(Finland) JJ Lehto	Dallara-Ferrari	68	+ 1 lap	23	
10	25	(Belgium) Thierry Boutsen	Ligier-Renault	67	+ 2 laps	21	
11	24	(Italy) Gianni Morbidelli	Minardi-Lamborghini	67	+ 2 laps	13	
12	3	(France) Olivier Grouillard	Tyrrell-Ilmor	67	+ 2 laps	26	
13	23	(Brazil) Christian Fittipaldi	Minardi-Lamborghini	65	+ 4 laps	25	
14	17	(France) Paul Belmondo	March-Ilmor	64	+ 5 laps	20	
Ret	30	(Japan) Ukyo Katayama	Venturi-Lamborghini	61	Engine	11	
Ret	20	(United Kingdom) Martin Brundle	Benetton-Ford	45	Transmission	7	
Ret	6	(Italy) Riccardo Patrese	Williams-Renault	43	Gearbox	2	
Ret	1	(Brazil) Ayrton Senna	McLaren-Honda	37	Electrical	1	
Ret	32	(Italy) Stefano Modena	Jordan-Yamaha	36	Transmission	17	
Ret	11	(Finland) Mika Häkkinen	Lotus-Ford	35	Gearbox	10	
Ret	12	(United Kingdom) Johnny Herbert	Lotus-Ford	34	Clutch	6	
Ret	28	(Italy) Ivan Capelli	Ferrari	18	Accident	9	
Ret	5	(United Kingdom) Nigel Mansell	Williams-Renault	14	Spun off	3	
Ret	33	(Brazil) Maurício Gugelmin	Jordan-Yamaha	14	Transmission	24	
DSQ	29	(France) Bertrand Gachot	Venturi-Lamborghini	14	Push start	19	
Ret	15	(Italy) Gabriele Tarquini	Fondmetal-Ford	0	Transmission	18	
DNQ	10	(Japan) Aguri Suzuki	Footwork-Mugen-Honda				
DNQ	7	(Belgium) Eric van de Poele	Brabham-Judd				
DNQ	14	(Switzerland) Andrea Chiesa	Fondmetal-Ford				
DNQ	8	(United Kingdom) Damon Hill	Brabham-Judd				
DNPQ	34	(Brazil) Roberto Moreno	Andrea Moda-Judd				

== Championship standings after the race ==
Drivers' Championship standings

Pos	Driver	Points
1	(United Kingdom) Nigel Mansell	56
2	(Italy) Riccardo Patrese	28
3	(Germany) Michael Schumacher	26
4	(Brazil) Ayrton Senna	18
5	(Austria) Gerhard Berger	18

Constructors' Championship standings

Pos	Constructor	Points
1	(United Kingdom) Williams-Renault	84
2	(United Kingdom) McLaren-Honda	36
3	(United Kingdom) Benetton-Ford	31
4	(Italy) Ferrari	13
5	(United Kingdom) Footwork-Mugen-Honda	5

- Note: Only the top five positions are included for both sets of standings.

Previous race: 1992 Monaco Grand Prix	FIA Formula One World Championship; 1992 season	Next race: 1992 French Grand Prix
Previous race: 1991 Canadian Grand Prix	Canadian Grand Prix	Next race: 1993 Canadian Grand Prix
