= 1992 Italian Grand Prix =

- Race 13 of 16 in the 1992 Formula One World Championship
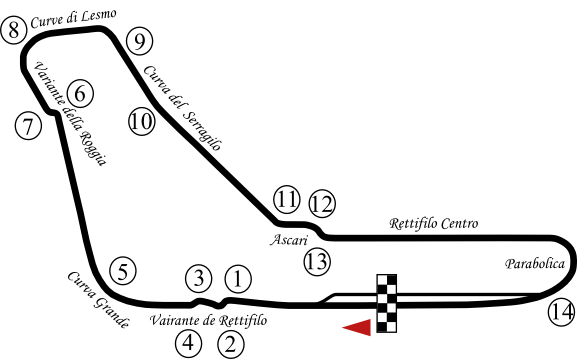

Race details
- Date: 13 September 1992
- Official name: Pioneer 63º Gran Premio d'Italia
- Location: Autodromo Nazionale di Monza; Monza, Lombardy, Italy
- Course: Permanent racing facility
- Course length: 5.800 km (3.604 miles)
- Distance: 53 laps, 307.400 km (191.01 miles)
- Weather: Sunny and warm

Pole position
Driver	(United Kingdom) Nigel Mansell	Williams-Renault
- Time: 1:22.221

Fastest lap
Driver	(United Kingdom) Nigel Mansell	Williams-Renault
- Time: 1:26.119 on lap 39

Podium
First	(Brazil) Ayrton Senna	McLaren-Honda
Second	(United Kingdom) Martin Brundle	Benetton-Ford
Third	(Germany) Michael Schumacher	Benetton-Ford

The 1992 Italian Grand Prix (formally the Pioneer 63º Gran Premio d'Italia) was a Formula One motor race held at Monza on 13 September 1992. It was the thirteenth race of the 1992 Formula One World Championship.

The 53-lap race was won by Brazilian driver Ayrton Senna, driving a McLaren-Honda, after he started from second position. It was Senna's third victory of the season. Briton Martin Brundle finished second in a Benetton-Ford, with German teammate Michael Schumacher third.

== Pre-race ==
As at the last Grand Prix in Belgium, there was no pre-qualifying session as entrants dropped out. The Brabham team had not returned after missing the last race, and Andrea Moda had been excluded from Formula One by FISA for "conduct prejudicial to the sport" after a succession of chaotic events throughout the season so far. The team arrived at Monza but were refused entry. This left 28 cars in the qualifying sessions.

Nigel Mansell announced his retirement from Formula One on the morning of the race, as rumours circulated that Williams had already signed Alain Prost for 1993, as well as attempting to sign Ayrton Senna. Angered and hurt by this, Mansell decided to announce his retirement despite being told minutes before the press conference that he would be able to partner Prost. Prost and Mansell previously had a difficult partnership at Ferrari in 1990.

== Qualifying ==
=== Qualifying report ===
Nigel Mansell took his eleventh pole position of the season in his Williams-Renault by 0.6 seconds from Ayrton Senna's McLaren-Honda. On Ferrari's home soil, Jean Alesi took third and Ivan Capelli seventh; between them were Mansell's teammate Riccardo Patrese, Senna's teammate Gerhard Berger, and Michael Schumacher's Benetton. The top ten was completed by Thierry Boutsen in the Ligier, Martin Brundle in the other Benetton and Bertrand Gachot tenth in Larrousse's best qualifying performance of the season.

The Jordans, with their underpowered Yamaha engines, struggled with Maurício Gugelmin coming 26th after an engine failure on Saturday morning, and Stefano Modena failing to qualify. Modena was joined in non-qualification by Christian Fittipaldi's Minardi.

=== Qualifying classification ===
Pos	No	Driver	Constructor	Q1	Q2	Gap
1	5	(United Kingdom) Nigel Mansell	Williams-Renault	1:22.586	1:22.221	
2	1	(Brazil) Ayrton Senna	McLaren-Honda	1:22.822	1:24.122	+0.601
3	27	(France) Jean Alesi	Ferrari	1:22.976	1:23.333	+0.755
4	6	(Italy) Riccardo Patrese	Williams-Renault	1:23.022	1:23.673	+0.801
5	2	(Austria) Gerhard Berger	McLaren-Honda	1:23.997	1:23.112	+0.891
6	19	(Germany) Michael Schumacher	Benetton-Ford	1:24.143	1:23.629	+1.408
7	28	(Italy) Ivan Capelli	Ferrari	1:24.877	1:24.321	+2.100
8	25	(Belgium) Thierry Boutsen	Ligier-Renault	1:25.173	1:24.413	+2.192
9	20	(United Kingdom) Martin Brundle	Benetton-Ford	1:24.551	1:25.253	+2.330
10	29	(France) Bertrand Gachot	Venturi-Lamborghini	1:25.173	1:24.654	+2.433
11	11	(Finland) Mika Häkkinen	Lotus-Ford	1:25.106	1:24.807	+2.586
12	24	(Italy) Gianni Morbidelli	Minardi-Lamborghini	1:25.575	1:24.912	+2.691
13	12	(United Kingdom) Johnny Herbert	Lotus-Ford	1:26.162	1:25.140	+2.919
14	21	(Finland) JJ Lehto	Dallara-Ferrari	1:25.951	1:25.145	+2.924
15	26	(France) Érik Comas	Ligier-Renault	1:25.178	1:25.270	+2.957
16	9	(Italy) Michele Alboreto	Footwork-Mugen-Honda	1:25.234	1:26.237	+3.013
17	16	(Austria) Karl Wendlinger	March-Ilmor	1:26.667	1:25.343	+3.122
18	3	(France) Olivier Grouillard	Tyrrell-Ilmor	1:25.354	1:26.008	+3.133
19	10	(Japan) Aguri Suzuki	Footwork-Mugen-Honda	1:25.775	1:25.374	+3.153
20	15	(Italy) Gabriele Tarquini	Fondmetal-Ford	1:26.307	1:25.420	+3.199
21	4	(Italy) Andrea de Cesaris	Tyrrell-Ilmor	1:25.502	1:25.425	+3.204
22	22	(Italy) Pierluigi Martini	Dallara-Ferrari	1:25.528	1:25.563	+3.342
23	30	(Japan) Ukyo Katayama	Venturi-Lamborghini	1:27.018	1:26.174	+3.953
24	17	(Italy) Emanuele Naspetti	March-Ilmor	1:26.279	1:26.288	+4.058
25	14	(Belgium) Eric van de Poele	Fondmetal-Ford	1:27.019	1:26.407	+4.186
26	33	(Brazil) Maurício Gugelmin	Jordan-Yamaha	1:26.463	1:27.531	+4.242
27	23	(Brazil) Christian Fittipaldi	Minardi-Lamborghini	1:27.228	1:26.510	+4.289
28	32	(Italy) Stefano Modena	Jordan-Yamaha	1:27.331	1:28.112	+5.110

== Race ==
=== Race report ===
Berger had an electrical problem on the grid, and was forced to start the race from the pit lane in the spare car.

At the start Mansell took the lead ahead of Senna who just managed to stay ahead of Alesi then Patrese and Capelli. Schumacher had a poor start selecting a wrong gear and then hit a Ligier from behind at the first chicane. He had to pit to replace the nose and front wing at the end of the first lap. Patrese managed to overtake Alesi at the start of lap 2. The opening laps saw both Berger and Schumacher recovering many positions from the back of the field and overtaking a number of slower cars.

At the front Mansell opened a gap with Senna unable to match his pace. The positions were Mansell, Senna with Patrese closing down on him and then the two Ferraris of Alesi and Capelli. Next Martin Brundle managed to overtake Capelli and moved into 5th position. Lap 12 proved disastrous for the Ferrari team with both cars retiring, Alesi, who was in fourth, due to a mechanical problem and Capelli spinning off at the Parabolica with electronic problems. On lap 14 Patrese overtook Senna and moved into second. Meanwhile, Berger pitted for new tyres and dropped back again. On lap 17 the order was Mansell in first, ten seconds in front of Patrese, with Senna two seconds further behind. Fourth was Brundle, some 28 seconds behind Mansell and then Boutsen and Herbert over 40 seconds behind Mansell. On lap 18, Herbert retired from sixth with an engine issue.

On lap 20 Patrese suddenly appeared in the lead as Mansell let his team-mate pass. The order was Patrese followed closely by Mansell and Senna in third. Schumacher overtook Boutsen and moved into fifth place. Positions at lap 27 were: Patrese, Mansell, Senna, Brundle, Schumacher and Boutsen. As the lead trio lapped the slower cars of Berger and Comas, Mansell continued to stay very close to Patrese and Senna tried his best not to lose contact with the two Williams cars; in fact he closed up on Mansell momentarily when the Williams had to take evasive action passing Comas at the Roggia. On lap 41 Mansell slowed through the Ascari bends and coasted into the pits with gearbox failure from loss of hydraulic pressure and had to retire. Classification at lap 44 was: Patrese, Senna, Brundle, Schumacher, then Berger and de Cesaris both a lap down. Patrese led comfortably until six laps from the end he suffered a hydraulic problem, forcing him to slow down and concede the lead to Ayrton Senna. In the closing stages of the race Senna allowed his teammate Berger to unlap himself. Patrese limped to the end of the race and finished fifth.

Senna won the race in what proved to be his last win with a Honda-powered car. The other places on the podium went to the two Benettons of Brundle and Schumacher.

=== Race classification ===
Pos	No	Driver	Constructor	Laps	Time/Retired	Grid	Points
1	1	(Brazil) Ayrton Senna	McLaren-Honda	53	1:18:15.349	2	10
2	20	(United Kingdom) Martin Brundle	Benetton-Ford	53	+ 17.050	9	6
3	19	(Germany) Michael Schumacher	Benetton-Ford	53	+ 24.373	6	4
4	2	(Austria) Gerhard Berger	McLaren-Honda	53	+ 1:25.490	5	3
5	6	(Italy) Riccardo Patrese	Williams-Renault	53	+ 1:33.158	4	2
6	4	(Italy) Andrea de Cesaris	Tyrrell-Ilmor	52	+ 1 lap	21	1
7	9	(Italy) Michele Alboreto	Footwork-Mugen-Honda	52	+ 1 lap	16	
8	22	(Italy) Pierluigi Martini	Dallara-Ferrari	52	+ 1 lap	22	
9	30	(Japan) Ukyo Katayama	Venturi-Lamborghini	50	Transmission	23	
10	16	(Austria) Karl Wendlinger	March-Ilmor	50	+ 3 laps	17	
11	21	(Finland) JJ Lehto	Dallara-Ferrari	47	Engine	14	
Ret	33	(Brazil) Maurício Gugelmin	Jordan-Yamaha	46	Transmission	26	
Ret	5	(United Kingdom) Nigel Mansell	Williams-Renault	41	Electrical	1	
Ret	25	(Belgium) Thierry Boutsen	Ligier-Renault	41	Throttle	8	
Ret	26	(France) Érik Comas	Ligier-Renault	35	Spun off	15	
Ret	15	(Italy) Gabriele Tarquini	Fondmetal-Ford	30	Gearbox	20	
Ret	3	(France) Olivier Grouillard	Tyrrell-Ilmor	26	Engine	18	
Ret	12	(United Kingdom) Johnny Herbert	Lotus-Ford	18	Engine	13	
Ret	17	(Italy) Emanuele Naspetti	March-Ilmor	17	Engine	24	
Ret	27	(France) Jean Alesi	Ferrari	12	Fuel system	3	
Ret	28	(Italy) Ivan Capelli	Ferrari	12	Electrical/Spun off	7	
Ret	24	(Italy) Gianni Morbidelli	Minardi-Lamborghini	12	Engine	12	
Ret	29	(France) Bertrand Gachot	Venturi-Lamborghini	11	Engine	10	
Ret	11	(Finland) Mika Häkkinen	Lotus-Ford	5	Engine	11	
Ret	10	(Japan) Aguri Suzuki	Footwork-Mugen-Honda	2	Suspension	19	
Ret	14	(Belgium) Eric van de Poele	Fondmetal-Ford	0	Clutch	25	
DNQ	23	(Brazil) Christian Fittipaldi	Minardi-Lamborghini				
DNQ	32	(Italy) Stefano Modena	Jordan-Yamaha				

== Championship standings after the race ==
Drivers' Championship standings

	Pos	Driver	Points
	1	(United Kingdom) **Nigel Mansell**	98
1	2	(Germany) Michael Schumacher	47
1	3	(Brazil) Ayrton Senna	46
2	4	(Italy) Riccardo Patrese	46
	5	(Austria) Gerhard Berger	27

Constructors' Championship standings

Pos	Constructor	Points
1	(United Kingdom) **Williams-Renault**	144
2	(United Kingdom) Benetton-Ford	74
3	(United Kingdom) McLaren-Honda	73
4	(Italy) Ferrari	16
5	(United Kingdom) Lotus-Ford	11

- Note: Only the top five positions are included for both sets of standings.
- **Bold text** indicates the 1992 World Champions.

Previous race: 1992 Belgian Grand Prix	FIA Formula One World Championship; 1992 season	Next race: 1992 Portuguese Grand Prix
Previous race: 1991 Italian Grand Prix	Italian Grand Prix	Next race: 1993 Italian Grand Prix
