= List of International Formula 3000 drivers =

This is a List of International Formula 3000 drivers, that is, a list of drivers who have made at least one race entry in the International Formula 3000 auto racing championship (also known as European Formula 3000) between 1985 and 2004. The list does not include data from non-championship races.

== By name ==
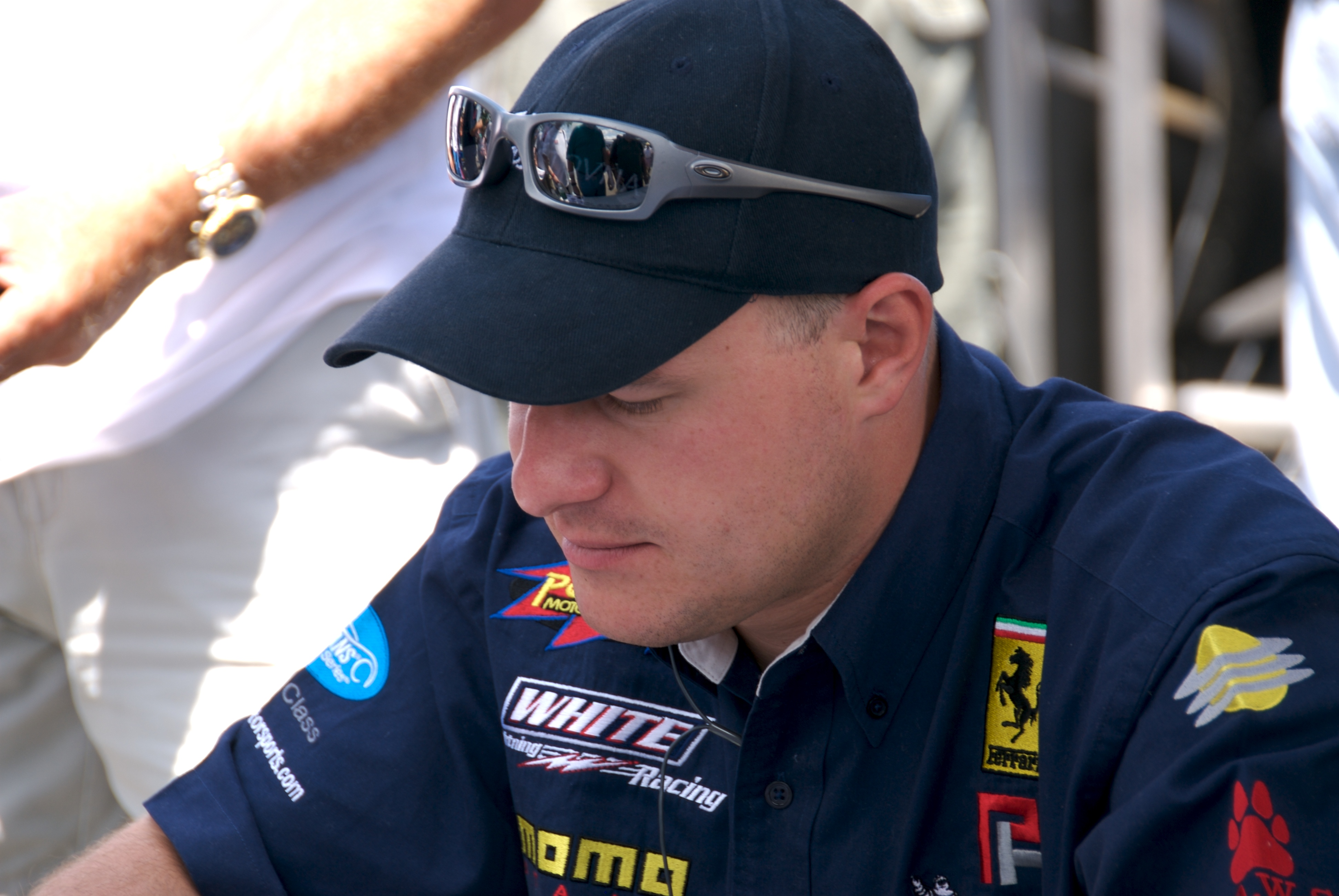
Czech driver Tomáš Enge (pictured in 2007) holds the record for most International Formula 3000 race starts, fastest laps, podium finishes and points scored, despite never winning the championship. He also jointly holds the record of most race entries with Fabrizio Gollin.

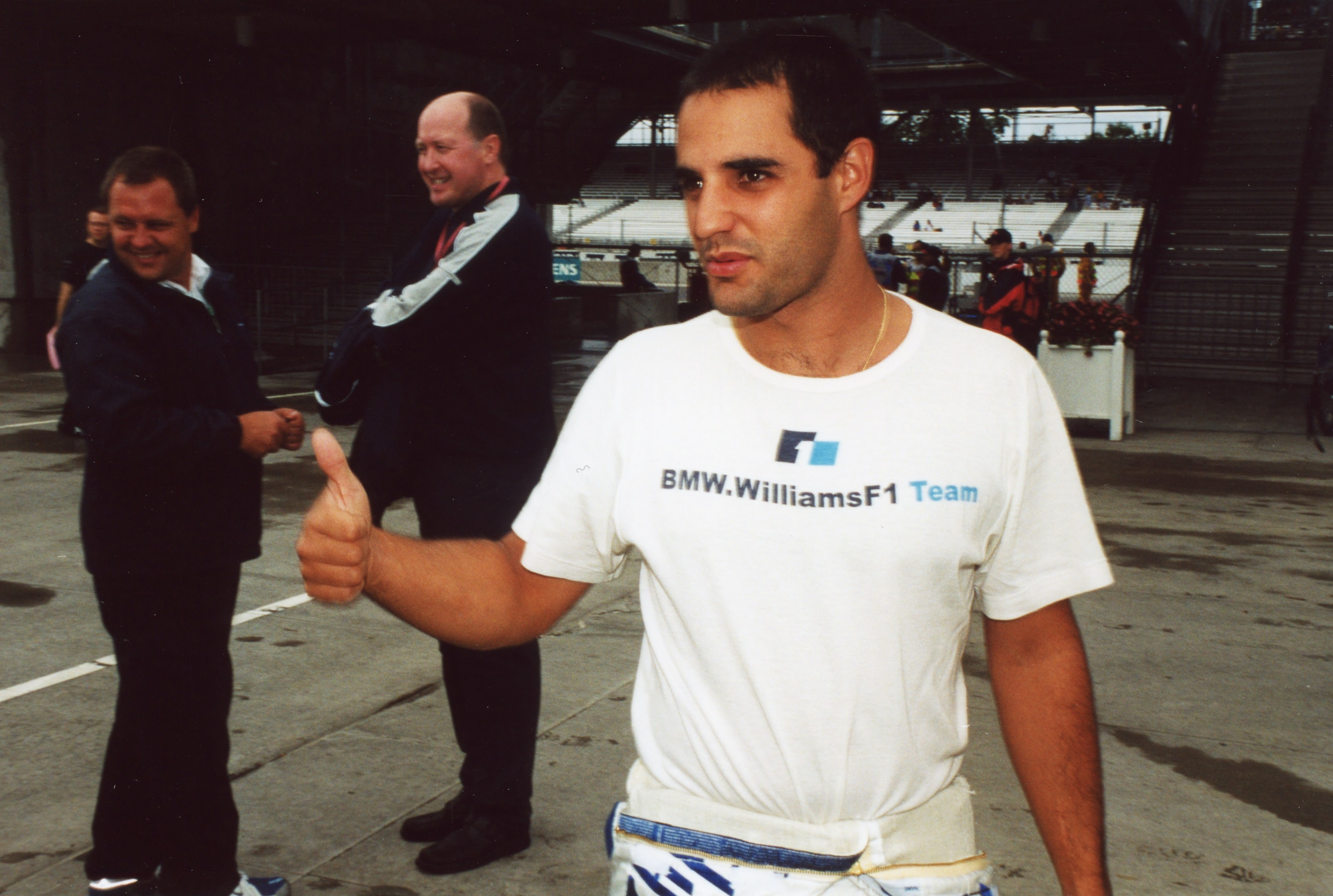
The 1998 champion, Juan Pablo Montoya (pictured in 2002), set new records for the highest number of pole positions and race wins during his time in F3000. These records have since been equalled by Vitantonio Liuzzi (both) and Nick Heidfeld (race wins only), who won the championship in 2004 and 1999 respectively.

Key
Symbol	Meaning
^	Driver has competed in Formula One

Name	Country	Seasons	Championship Titles	Race entries (Starts)	Poles	Wins	Podiums	Fastest Laps	Points
Kenny Acheson	United Kingdom	1986	0	1	0	0	0	0	0
Rui Águas	Portugal	1997–1998	0	16	0	0	0	1	7
Laurent Aïello	France	1991–1992	0	20 (19)	1	0	1	0	7
Antonio Albacete	Spain	1987	0	1 (0)	0	0	0	0	0
Christijan Albers^	Netherlands	2000	0	10 (9)	0	0	0	0	0
Mark Albon	United Kingdom	1997-1998	0	8(8)	0	0	0	0	0
John Alcorn	United Kingdom	1987	0	2 (0)	0	0	0	0	0
Jean Alesi^	France	1988–1989	1 (1989)	20	2	3	5	1	50
Philippe Alliot^	France	1985–1986	0	7	1	1	1	0	10
Giovanni Aloi	Mexico	1990	0	4 (3)	0	0	0	0	0
Fernando Alonso^	Spain	2000	0	10 (9)	1	1	2	2	17
Giovanna Amati^	Italy	1987–1988, 1990–1991	0	31 (14)	0	0	0	0	0
Phil Andrews	United Kingdom	1988–1990, 1992–1993	0	35 (29)	0	0	0	0	0
Steven Andskär	Sweden	1986–1988	0	16 (12)	0	0	0	0	0
Max Angelelli	Italy	1991	0	1	0	0	0	0	0
Éric Angelvy	France	1993	0	5 (4)	0	0	0	0	0
Claudio Antonioli	Italy	1986	0	4 (1)	0	0	0	0	0
Marco Apicella^	Italy	1987–1991, 1999	0	54 (52)	2	0	6	9	71
Steve Arnold	United Kingdom	1996	0	1	0	0	0	0	0
Can Artam	Turkey	2004	0	9	0	0	0	0	0
Didier Artzet	France	1988–1990	0	14 (11)	0	0	1	0	4
Bernhard Auinger	Austria	2003	0	2	0	0	0	0	0
Soheil Ayari	France	1997–2000	0	41 (40)	1	2	5	3	48
Éric Bachelart	Belgium	1988	0	2 (0)	0	0	0	0	0
Luca Badoer^	Italy	1992	1 (1992)	10	5	4	5	3	46
Julian Bailey^	United Kingdom	1987	0	7	0	1	1	0	13
Fulvio Ballabio	Italy	1985–1986	0	2 (1)	0	0	0	0	0
Fabrizio Barbazza^	Italy	1987–1988, 1990–1991	0	18 (14)	0	0	0	0	3
Paolo Barilla^	Italy	1986–1988	0	22 (19)	0	0	0	0	3
Rubens Barrichello^	Brazil	1992	0	10	0	0	4	2	27
Michael Bartels^	Germany	1990–1993	0	32 (31)	1	0	5	1	30
Marcelo Battistuzzi	Brazil	1998–1999	0	18 (14)	0	0	0	0	1
Zsolt Baumgartner^	Hungary	2001–2003	0	28 (27)	0	0	0	0	7
Townsend Bell	United States	2003	0	10	0	0	1	0	17
Éric Bellefroid	France	1988	0	3 (0)	0	0	0	0	0
Jean-Philippe Belloc	France	1995–1997	0	22	0	0	1	0	6
Paul Belmondo^	France	1987–1991	0	53 (45)	0	0	0	0	3
Anthony Beltoise	France	1997	0	7	0	0	0	0	0
Olivier Beretta^	Monaco	1992–1993	0	19	1	1	1	0	20
Éric Bernard^	France	1988–1989	0	20 (19)	3	1	4	3	38
Enrique Bernoldi^	Brazil	1999–2000	0	20 (18)	1	0	0	0	7
Sascha Bert	Germany	1999	0	2 (0)	0	0	0	0	0
Enrico Bertaggia^	Italy	1988–1989, 1993	0	22 (10)	0	0	0	0	2
Giovanni Berton	Italy	2003	0	1	0	0	0	0	0
Aldo Bertuzzi	Italy	1985–1987	0	10 (2)	0	0	0	0	0
Thomas Biagi	Italy	1995–1999	0	31 (22)	0	0	0	0	7
Thed Björk	Sweden	2002	0	5	0	0	0	0	0
Mark Blundell^	United Kingdom	1987–1989	0	31 (28)	0	0	4	2	31
Andrea Boldrini	Italy	1999	0	5 (1)	0	0	0	0	0
Giovanni Bonanno	Italy	1990–1992	0	21 (16)	0	0	0	0	0
Slim Borgudd	Sweden	1985	0	4 (3)	0	0	0	0	0
Christophe Bouchut	France	1995	0	8	0	0	1	0	6
Jean-Christophe Boullion^	France	1993–1994	1 (1994)	17	0	3	6	2	48
Claude Bourbonnais	Canada	1990	0	2 (0)	0	0	0	0	0
Sébastien Bourdais^	France	2000–2002	1 (2002)	34 (33)	8	4	12	4	91
David Brabham^	Australia	1991	0	4	0	0	0	0	0
Gary Brabham^	Australia	1989–1990	0	18 (15)	0	0	2	0	10
Kenny Bräck	Sweden	1994–1996	0	26 (25)	5	4	11	3	78
Cary Bren	United States	1986	0	4 (1)	0	0	0	0	0
Ryan Briscoe	Australia	2002	0	7	0	0	0	0	0
Giuseppe Bugatti	Italy	1991–1993	0	25 (23)	0	0	1	0	8
Giambattista Busi	Italy	1992	0	8 (7)	0	0	0	0	0
Max Busslinger	Switzerland	1985	0	2	0	0	0	0	0
Tommy Byrne^	Ireland	1986	0	1	0	0	0	0	0
Gianluca Calcagni	Italy	2001	0	1	0	0	0	0	0
Joël Camathias	Switzerland	2001	0	12	0	0	0	0	2
Daniel Campeau	Canada	1988	0	4 (0)	0	0	0	0	0
Adrián Campos^	Spain	1986	0	9 (5)	0	0	0	0	1
Marco Campos	Brazil	1995	0	8	0	0	0	0	3
Ivan Capelli^	Italy	1985–1986	1 (1986)	19 (17)	3	3	8	2	52
Paolo Carcasci	Brazil	1994	0	1	0	0	0	0	0
Dominic Chappell	United Kingdom	1993	0	2	0	0	0	0	0
Pierre Chauvet	Austria	1985–1986, 1988	0	18 (12)	0	0	0	0	0
Pedro Chaves^	Portugal	1989–1990, 1992	0	24 (18)	0	0	0	0	3
Ross Cheever	United States	1986	0	1 (0)	0	0	0	0	0
Éric Chéli	France	1989	0	10 (5)	0	0	0	0	0
Andrea Chiesa^	Switzerland	1988–1991	0	40 (36)	0	1	4	0	34
Emmanuel Clérico	France	1994–1995, 1997	0	17	1	0	1	3	15
Jonathan Cochet	France	2001	0	4	0	0	0	0	0
Roberto Colciago	Italy	1991	0	10 (8)	0	0	0	0	0
Emmanuel Collard	France	1991–1993	0	21 (20)	1	0	2	0	17
Érik Comas^	France	1989–1990	1 (1990)	21 (20)	5	6	11	5	90
Constantino Jr.	Brazil	1993	0	9 (7)	0	0	0	0	0
David Cook	United Kingdom	1997–1998	0	13 (8)	0	0	0	0	0
Bruno Corradi	Italy	1986	0	2 (0)	0	0	0	0	0
Didier Cottaz	France	1994–1995	0	16	0	0	2	0	14
Pedro Couceiro	Portugal	1996–1997	0	18 (17)	0	0	1	0	8
David Coulthard^	United Kingdom	1992–1994	0	20	0	1	7	3	42
André Couto	Macau	1998–2000	0	32 (30)	0	0	2	0	15
Hilton Cowie	South Africa	1993	0	2 (0)	0	0	0	0	0
Dave Coyne	United Kingdom	1991	0	1	0	0	0	0	0
Patrick Crinelli	Italy	1994	0	2	0	0	0	0	0
Fernando Croceri	Argentina	1988	0	5 (0)	0	0	0	0	0
Cristiano da Matta^	Brazil	1996	0	10	0	0	0	0	7
Guido Daccò	Italy	1985–1987	0	23 (12)	0	0	0	0	6
Richard Dallest	France	1986	0	9 (8)	0	0	0	0	3
Yannick Dalmas^	France	1986–1987	0	11	1	2	2	3	20
Thomas Danielsson	Sweden	1988–1989	0	18 (17)	0	1	2	0	14
Christian Danner^	Germany	1985	1 (1985)	11	2	4	7	4	51 (52)
Jamie Davies	United Kingdom	1997–2000	0	35 (32)	1	1	7	1	37
Tim Davies	United Kingdom	1986	0	1	0	0	0	0	0
Alexandre de Andrade	Brazil	1996	0	1	0	0	0	0	0
Miguel Ángel de Castro	Spain	1997	0	1 (0)	0	0	0	0	0
Bernard de Dryver^	Belgium	1988	0	1 (0)	0	0	0	0	0
Gil de Ferran	Brazil	1993–1994	0	17	2	3	7	1	49
Grégoire de Galzain	France	1997–1999	0	26 (15)	0	0	0	0	0
Stefan de Groodt	Belgium	1995	0	2	0	0	0	0	0
Fabrizio De Simone	Italy	1994–1995	0	16	0	0	1	0	9
Wladimiro De Tomaso	Italy	1988	0	3 (0)	0	0	0	0	0
Alfonso de Vinuesa	Spain	1986–1988	0	14 (5)	0	0	0	0	1
Richard Dean	United Kingdom	1990, 1992	0	6	0	0	0	0	2
Enrico Debenedetti	Italy	1988	0	4 (0)	0	0	0	0	0
Roberto Del Castello	Italy	1985	0	3	0	0	0	0	0
Laurent Delahaye	France	1999	0	5 (0)	0	0	0	0	0
Dominique Delestre	France	1986–1987, 1989	0	10 (5)	0	0	0	0	0
Jean-Denis Délétraz^	Switzerland	1988–1991	0	28 (20)	0	0	2	0	8
Paolo Delle Piane	Italy	1990–1994	0	43 (36)	0	0	0	0	2
Thierry Delubac	France	1990–1991	0	9 (2)	0	0	0	0	0
Boris Derichebourg	France	1997–1999	0	25 (23)	0	0	2	0	9
Pedro Diniz^	Brazil	1993–1994	0	17 (16)	0	0	0	0	3
Martin Donnelly^	United Kingdom	1988–1989	0	15	1	3	6	3	43
Robert Doornbos^	Netherlands	2004	0	10	0	1	4	1	44
Urs Dudler	Switzerland	1987	0	1 (0)	0	0	0	0	0
Romain Dumas	France	1999	0	1 (0)	0	0	0	0	0
Johnny Dumfries^	United Kingdom	1985, 1988	0	8	0	0	0	0	1
David Dussau	France	1996	0	2	0	0	0	0	0
Tomáš Enge^	Czech Republic	1998–2002, 2004	0	58 (55)	8	6	16	10	149
Cor Euser	Netherlands	1986–1989	0	22 (17)	0	0	0	0	2
Gary Evans	United Kingdom	1986–1989	0	43 (30)	0	0	0	0	2.5
Wim Eyckmans	Belgium	1994–1995	0	10	0	0	0	0	1
Corrado Fabi^	Italy	1987	0	3 (1)	0	0	0	0	0
Pascal Fabre^	France	1985–1986	0	10	1	1	3	1	15.5
Nino Famà	Italy	1988	0	1 (0)	0	0	0	0	0
Juan Manuel Fangio II	Argentina	1985	0	7	0	0	0	0	1
Philippe Favre	Switzerland	1989–1990	0	12 (10)	1	0	1	1	6
Hans Fertl	Germany	1995	0	2 (1)	0	0	0	0	0
Alain Ferté	France	1985–1989	0	25	0	0	2	0	17
Michel Ferté	France	1985–1989	0	37 (35)	2	0	9	2	49
Alain Filhol	France	1995	0	3 (2)	0	0	0	0	0
Nicolás Filiberti	Argentina	1999, 2001	0	5 (4)	0	0	0	0	0
Christian Fittipaldi^	Brazil	1991	1 (1991)	10	4	1	7	1	47
Gregor Foitek^	Switzerland	1986–1988	0	22 (18)	1	1	1	0	15
Norberto Fontana^	Argentina	1996, 1999, 2001	0	14	0	0	0	0	4
Franco Forini^	Switzerland	1986	0	6 (2)	0	0	0	0	1
Gary Formato	South Africa	1995	0	8	0	0	0	0	0
Heinz-Harald Frentzen^	Germany	1990–1991	0	21 (19)	0	0	0	0	8
Franck Fréon	France	1990	0	7 (3)	0	0	0	0	2
Jean-Pierre Frey	Switzerland	1986–1987	0	19 (0)	0	0	0	0	0
Markus Friesacher	Austria	1997, 1999	0	13 (3)	0	0	0	0	0
Patrick Friesacher^	Austria	2001–2004	0	42 (41)	0	2	7	1	91
Gabriel Furlán	Argentina	1991	0	10 (9)	0	0	0	0	1
Beppe Gabbiani^	Italy	1986–1987	0	3 (2)	0	0	0	0	0
Philippe Gache	France	1989–1991	0	27 (24)	0	0	0	1	2
Bertrand Gachot^	Belgium	1988	0	11	1	0	2	0	21
Mark Galvin	Ireland	1986	0	1 (0)	0	0	0	0	0
Antonio García	Spain	2001	0	7	0	0	0	0	0
Oliver Gavin	United Kingdom	1994, 1997, 1999	0	18 (8)	0	0	0	0	3
Jordi Gené	Spain	1992–1994	0	19	1	1	3	0	24
Marc Gené^	Spain	1997	0	5 (4)	0	0	0	1	0
Raffaele Giammaria	Italy	2003–2004	0	19	0	0	2	0	41
Philip Giebler	United States	2003	0	5 (4)	0	0	0	0	1
Andrea Gilardi	Italy	1993	0	4	0	0	0	0	2
Andrew Gilbert-Scott	United Kingdom	1986, 1989–1991	0	25 (20)	0	0	1	0	4
Fabrizio Giovanardi	Italy	1989–1991	0	31 (25)	0	1	2	0	25
Fabien Giroix	France	1988	0	5	0	0	0	0	3
Domenico Gitto	Italy	1988–1990, 1993	0	8 (4)	0	0	0	0	0
Bertrand Godin	Canada	1998	0	12 (11)	0	0	0	0	0
Fabrizio Gollin	Italy	1996–2001	0	58 (48)	0	0	1	0	10
Guillaume Gomez	France	1994–1996	0	25 (23)	2	0	4	2	20
Marc Goossens	Belgium	1994–1996, 1999–2001	0	43 (39)	2	3	7	1	63
Frédéric Gosparini	France	1992	0	7	0	0	0	0	0
Claude-Yves Gosselin	France	1995	0	6 (3)	0	0	0	0	0
Jacques Goudchaux	France	1988–1989	0	10 (5)	0	0	0	0	0
Yann Goudy	France	2001	0	1	0	0	0	0	0
Jean-Marc Gounon^	France	1990–1992	0	31 (29)	0	2	4	1	43
Jean-Philippe Grand	France	1985	0	2 (1)	0	0	0	0	0
Matteo Grassotto	Italy	2004	0	2	0	0	0	0	1
Marco Greco	Brazil	1988–1990	0	18 (4)	0	0	0	0	0
Michael Greenfield	United States	1988	0	1 (0)	0	0	0	0	0
Olivier Grouillard^	France	1985–1988	0	34 (32)	3	2	5	2	49
Marcos Gueiros	Brazil	1995–1996	0	18	0	0	3	0	22
Esteban Guerrieri	Argentina	2004	0	10	0	0	1	0	28
Maurício Gugelmin^	Brazil	1986–1987	0	22 (20)	2	1	5	0	34
Mario Haberfeld	Brazil	1999–2002	0	42 (36)	0	0	2	1	21
Sam Hancock	United Kingdom	2003	0	3 (2)	0	0	0	0	0
Naoki Hattori^	Japan	1995	0	2	0	0	0	0	0
Altfrid Heger	Germany	1986–1987	0	14 (7)	0	0	0	0	0
Nick Heidfeld^	Germany	1998–1999	1 (1999)	22	6	7	14	9	107
Éric Hélary	France	1991–1992	0	9	0	0	1	0	9
Wolf Henzler	Germany	1999	0	7 (3)	0	0	0	0	0
Johnny Herbert^	United Kingdom	1988	0	6	2	1	2	1	13
Jan Heylen	Belgium	2004	0	4	0	0	0	0	1
Steve Hiesse	France	1999	0	1 (0)	0	0	0	0	0
Damon Hill^	United Kingdom	1988–1991	0	29 (27)	3	0	3	2	17
Derek Hill	United States	2001–2003	0	25	0	0	0	0	4
Ross Hockenhull	United Kingdom	1989	0	3	0	0	0	0	0
Christian Horner	United Kingdom	1997–1998	0	22 (14)	0	0	0	0	1
David Hunt	United Kingdom	1988	0	10 (6)	0	0	0	0	0
Marc Hynes	United Kingdom	2000, 2003	0	4 (3)	0	0	0	0	0
Mario Hytten	Switzerland	1985–1988	0	27 (20)	0	0	1	0	8
Akira Iida	Japan	1996	0	10	0	0	0	0	0
Taki Inoue^	Japan	1994	0	8	0	0	0	0	0
Eddie Irvine^	United Kingdom	1989–1990	0	21 (19)	1	1	5	0	38
Jaroslav Janiš	Czech Republic	2001, 2003	0	11 (10)	0	0	0	0	20
Ken Johnson	United States	1986	0	5 (3)	0	0	0	0	0
John Jones	Canada	1986–1987, 1990	0	33 (28)	1	0	2	0	16
Elton Julian	United States	1994, 1996	0	13 (12)	0	0	0	0	2
Bruno Junqueira	Brazil	1998–2000	1 (2000)	32 (31)	3	5	7	1	71
Tomas Kaiser	Sweden	1985–1987	0	30 (27)	0	0	0	0	7
Jonny Kane	United Kingdom	1998	0	4	0	0	0	0	0
Simon Kane	Australia	1991	0	2 (0)	0	0	0	0	0
Ukyo Katayama^	Japan	1989	0	4 (2)	0	0	0	0	0
Justin Keen	United Kingdom	2001–2002	0	5	0	0	0	0	0
Steve Kempton	United Kingdom	1988	0	3 (1)	0	0	0	0	0
Michael Keohane	Ireland	2003	0	2	0	0	0	0	0
Robbie Kerr	United Kingdom	2003	0	1 (0)	0	0	0	0	0
Nicolas Kiesa^	Denmark	2002–2003	0	19	0	1	2	0	23
Guido Knycz	Italy	1992–1993	0	12 (9)	0	0	0	0	0
Kristian Kolby	Denmark	2000, 2002	0	13 (9)	0	0	0	0	2
Peter Kox	Netherlands	1988	0	1	0	0	0	0	0
Tom Kristensen	Denmark	1996–1997	0	17 (16)	4	1	5	2	37
Franck Lagorce^	France	1993–1994	0	17 (16)	5	4	6	4	55
Jan Lammers^	Netherlands	1986, 1993, 1995	0	10	0	0	0	0	3
Pedro Lamy^	Portugal	1993	0	9 (8)	2	1	4	2	31
Gabriele Lancieri	Italy	2001	0	12	0	0	0	0	0
Eric Lang	United States	1985	0	2	0	0	0	0	0
Claudio Langes^	Italy	1985–1989	0	34 (33)	0	0	1	0	15
Will Langhorne	United States	2003	0	5	0	0	0	0	0
Nicola Larini^	Italy	1986–1987	0	5	0	0	0	0	0
Mathias Lauda	Austria	2004	0	10	0	0	0	0	5
Giovanni Lavaggi^	Italy	1991	0	10 (2)	0	0	0	0	0
Nicolas Leboissetier	France	1993–1994	0	9	0	0	0	0	3
Robert Lee-Lewis	United Kingdom	1987	0	7 (0)	0	0	0	0	0
JJ Lehto^	Finland	1989	0	9	0	0	0	0	6
Bas Leinders	Belgium	1999–2001	0	32 (28)	0	0	2	0	18
Patrick Lemarié	France	1996–1997	0	16 (15)	0	0	0	0	6
Gilles Lempereur	France	1987	0	2 (1)	0	0	0	0	0
Lamberto Leoni^	Italy	1985–1987	0	29 (27)	0	0	2	1	20
Vitantonio Liuzzi^	Italy	2003–2004	1 (2004)	20	10	7	11	3	125
Stefano Livio	Italy	1985	0	1	0	0	0	0	0
Ellen Lohr	Germany	1990	0	1 (0)	0	0	0	0	0
Craig Lowndes	Australia	1997	0	10	0	0	0	0	3
José María López	Argentina	2004	0	10	0	0	2	2	28
Marco Lucchinelli	Italy	1986	0	1	0	0	0	0	0
Werner Lupberger	South Africa	1997–1998	0	22 (20)	0	0	0	0	4
Fabio Mancini	Italy	1988	0	3 (0)	0	0	0	0	0
Darren Manning	United Kingdom	2000–2001	0	22	1	0	3	1	19
Tarso Marques^	Brazil	1994–1995	0	16 (15)	2	1	2	3	18
Mauro Martini	Italy	1989	0	4 (3)	0	0	0	0	0
Oliver Martini	Italy	1998–1999	0	21 (14)	0	0	0	0	3
Pierluigi Martini^	Italy	1986–1988	0	32 (31)	2	3	9	2	58
Viktor Maslov	Russia	1999–2001	0	32 (17)	0	0	0	0	0
Norio Matsubara	Brazil	1994	0	1	0	0	0	0	0
Ricardo Maurício	Brazil	1999–2002	0	40 (37)	0	0	4	0	28
Gastón Mazzacane^	Argentina	1996–1999	0	33 (29)	0	0	0	0	2
Perry McCarthy^	United Kingdom	1988–1989	0	7 (5)	0	0	0	0	0
Kevin McGarrity	United Kingdom	1998–2000	0	28 (22)	0	0	1	0	12
Allan McNish^	United Kingdom	1989–1992, 1994–1995	0	38 (36)	3	2	6	1	47
Jeff MacPherson	United States	1986	0	7 (4)	0	0	0	0	0
Arnd Meier	Germany	1999	0	7 (0)	0	0	0	0	0
Ruggero Melgrati	Italy	1988	0	1 (0)	0	0	0	0	0
Jaime Melo	Brazil	2000–2001	0	19 (17)	1	0	1	0	14
Matteo Meneghello	Italy	2004	0	1	0	0	0	0	0
Alain Menu	Switzerland	1990–1991	0	7 (6)	0	0	0	0	2
Ananda Mikola	Indonesia	2000–2001	0	13 (10)	0	0	0	0	0
Nicolas Minassian	France	1998–2000, 2003	0	32	1	4	8	0	70
Hidetoshi Mitsusada	Japan	1998, 2000	0	6 (3)	0	0	0	0	0
Stefano Modena^	Italy	1987	1 (1987)	11	0	3	4	1	40 (41)
Kurt Mollekens	Belgium	1997–1998	0	21 (18)	0	0	2	0	22
Ferdinando Monfardini	Italy	2003–2004	0	12	0	0	0	0	0
Franck Montagny^	France	1999–2000	0	20	0	0	1	0	11
Christian Montanari	San Marino	2003	0	1	0	0	0	0	0
Giovanni Montanari	Italy	1998–1999	0	16 (12)	0	0	0	0	0
Tiago Monteiro^	Portugal	2002	0	12	0	0	0	0	2
Andrea Montermini^	Italy	1990–1992	0	31	5	3	8	2	55
Massimo Monti	Italy	1988–1989, 1991	0	15 (8)	0	0	0	0	0
Juan Pablo Montoya^	Colombia	1997–1998	1 (1998)	22	10	7	13	7	102.5
Benoît Morand	Switzerland	1986–1988	0	6 (0)	0	0	0	0	0
Gianni Morbidelli^	Italy	1990	0	11	1	1	3	0	20
Dino Morelli	United Kingdom	1995, 1997–2001	0	19 (17)	0	0	1	0	6
Roberto Moreno^	Brazil	1985–1988	1 (1988)	27	7	5	9	4	76
Alexander Müller	Germany	1998–1999, 2002	0	25 (21)	0	0	0	0	2
Cathy Muller	France	1986, 1988	0	9 (4)	0	0	0	0	0
Jörg Müller	Germany	1996	1 (1996)	10	2	2	8	4	52
Yvan Muller	France	1993	0	9	0	0	0	0	2
Valentino Musetti	United Kingdom	1985	0	1	0	0	0	0	0
Satoru Nakajima^	Japan	1986	0	7	0	0	0	0	7
Severino Nardozzi	Italy	1993–1995	0	17 (14)	0	0	0	0	0
Emanuele Naspetti^	Italy	1989–1992	0	35 (31)	2	5	6	4	59
Rob Nguyen	Australia	2002–2003	0	15	0	0	0	0	7
John Nielsen	Denmark	1985–1986	0	22	2	1	8	3	52
Chanoch Nissany	Israel	2004	0	3	0	0	0	0	0
Kris Nissen	Denmark	1987	0	1 (0)	0	0	0	0	0
Hideki Noda^	Japan	1992–1994	0	26 (24)	0	0	1	0	6
Jari Nurminen	Finland	1986–1988	0	32 (13)	0	0	0	0	0
Markus Oestreich	Germany	1988	0	2 (0)	0	0	0	0	0
Yves Olivier	Belgium	2000	0	10 (6)	0	0	0	0	0
Peter Olsson	Sweden	1995–1996	0	7 (6)	0	0	0	0	0
Sergio Paese	Brazil	1996	0	2	0	0	0	0	0
Gary Paffett	United Kingdom	2003	0	1	0	0	0	0	0
Gianluca Paglicci	Italy	1997	0	1	0	0	0	0	0
Klaus Panchyrz	Germany	1993	0	2 (1)	0	0	0	0	0
Olivier Panis^	France	1992–1993	1 (1993)	19	2	3	6	2	42
Giorgio Pantano^	Italy	2001–2003	0	34	3	6	12	7	107
Massimiliano Papis^	Italy	1993–1994	0	17	1	1	1	0	19
Andrej Pavicevic	Australia	1999	0	10 (4)	0	0	0	0	0
Oscar Pedersoli	Italy	1986	0	1 (0)	0	0	0	0	0
Luis Pérez-Sala^	Spain	1986–1987	0	22 (21)	2	4	6	2	57.5
Christian Pescatori	Italy	1994–1996	0	26	0	0	1	1	13
Andrea Piccini	Italy	1999–2001	0	32 (27)	0	0	0	0	6
Alessandro Piccolo	Italy	2003	0	4 (3)	0	0	0	0	0
Emanuele Pirro^	Italy	1985–1986	0	22	4	4	9	3	70
Antônio Pizzonia^	Brazil	2001–2002	0	24	1	1	3	1	40
Fernando Plata	Mexico	1991	0	5 (0)	0	0	0	0	0
Jérôme Policand	France	1992–1995	0	34	0	0	1	0	11
Stéphane Proulx	Canada	1989–1990	0	21	0	0	0	1	2
Luca Rangoni	Italy	1996	0	1	0	0	0	0	1
Pierre-Henri Raphanel^	France	1986–1988	0	33 (32)	1	0	3	0	20
Laurent Redon	France	1996–1997	0	20	0	0	1	0	17
Gareth Rees	United Kingdom	1995, 1997–1998	0	26 (25)	0	0	1	0	14
Otto Rensing	Germany	1990	0	1 (0)	0	0	0	0	0
Rodrigo Ribeiro	Brazil	2004	0	4	0	0	0	0	1
Steve Robertson	United Kingdom	1992	0	9 (7)	0	0	0	0	0
Gonzalo Rodríguez	Uruguay	1997–1999	0	29 (27)	0	3	7	4	60.5
Marzio Romano	Switzerland	1986–1987	0	2 (0)	0	0	0	0	0
Carl Rosenblad	Sweden	1996	0	10 (9)	0	0	0	0	0
Ricardo Rosset^	Brazil	1995	0	8	1	2	3	2	29
Marc Rostan	France	1994–1996	0	6	0	0	0	0	0
Paolo Ruberti	Italy	1998–1999	0	16 (14)	0	0	0	0	0
Michele Rugolo	Italy	2004	0	1	0	0	0	0	0
Rickard Rydell	Sweden	1989	0	1	0	0	0	0	0
David Saelens	Belgium	1999–2002	0	35 (30)	2	0	4	0	33
Eliseo Salazar^	Chile	1986–1987	0	20 (14)	0	0	0	1	1.5
Maurizio Sandro Sala	Brazil	1988	0	1	0	0	0	0	0
Bernard Santel	Switzerland	1986	0	1	0	0	0	0	0
Alessandro Santin	Italy	1985–1988	0	21 (20)	0	0	0	0	1.5
Stéphane Sarrazin^	France	1998–2001	0	29	1	2	5	3	48
Cyrille Sauvage	France	1996–1999	0	34 (32)	0	0	0	0	8
Franco Scapini	Italy	1986, 1988–1989	0	19 (7)	0	0	0	0	0
Valerio Scassellati	Italy	2003	0	4	0	0	0	0	0
Dave Scott	United Kingdom	1986	0	1 (0)	0	0	0	0	0
Tomas Scheckter	South Africa	2000–2001	0	5 (4)	0	0	1	0	6
Andreas Scheld	Germany	2000	0	9 (5)	0	0	0	0	0
Thomas Schie	Norway	1997	0	10 (5)	0	0	0	0	0
Tony Schmidt	Germany	2002–2004	0	31	0	0	0	0	25
Yannick Schroeder	France	2003–2004	0	16	0	0	1	0	26
Dominik Schwager	Germany	1998	0	12 (11)	0	0	0	0	3
Mark Shaw	United Kingdom	1998	0	12 (10)	0	0	0	0	0
Norman Simon	Germany	1999	0	9 (5)	0	0	0	0	0
Giampiero Simoni	Italy	1992–1993	0	14	0	0	0	0	2
Mark Skaife	Australia	1992	0	2	0	0	0	0	0
Brian Smith	Argentina	1998–1999	0	10 (8)	0	0	0	0	0
Vincenzo Sospiri^	Italy	1990–1991, 1993–1995	1 (1995)	37 (35)	0	3	10	1	91
Emiliano Spataro	Argentina	1997	0	9 (6)	0	0	0	0	0
Russell Spence	United Kingdom	1986–1988	0	33 (26)	0	0	2	0	10.5
Alexandre Sperafico	Brazil	2002	0	9	0	0	0	0	0
Ricardo Sperafico	Brazil	2001–2003	0	34	4	3	12	2	89
Rodrigo Sperafico	Brazil	2001–2002	0	22	0	1	3	0	20
Paul Stewart	United Kingdom	1991–1993	0	29 (26)	0	0	1	0	13
Robbie Stirling	Canada	1994	0	1	0	0	0	0	0
Philippe Streiff^	France	1985	0	11	0	0	1	0	12
Aguri Suzuki^	Japan	1988	0	3 (2)	0	0	0	0	0
Franco Tacchino	Italy	1986	0	7 (2)	0	0	0	0	0
Antonio Tamburini	Italy	1990–1991, 1993	0	24 (23)	0	1	2	1	28
Gabriele Tarquini^	Italy	1985–1987	0	32 (31)	0	0	4	1	33
Marcel Tarrès	France	1986	0	1 (0)	0	0	0	0	0
Thierry Tassin	Belgium	1985–1987	0	10	0	0	0	1	1
James Taylor	United Kingdom	1994–1998	0	23 (16)	0	0	0	0	0
Wayne Taylor	South Africa	1986	0	1	0	0	0	0	0
Felice Tedeschi	Italy	1991	0	8 (5)	0	0	0	0	0
Nicola Tesini	Italy	1986–1987	0	4 (0)	0	0	0	0	0
David Terrien	France	1998	0	10 (6)	0	0	0	0	0
Mike Thackwell^	New Zealand	1985–1986, 1988	0	16	5	4	7	4	55.5
Oliver Tichy	Austria	1996–1998	0	25 (24)	0	0	3	0	19
Olivier Tielemans	Netherlands	2004	0	5	0	0	0	0	0
Christophe Tinseau	France	1995–1996	0	18	0	1	2	0	19
Enrico Toccacelo	Italy	2001–2004	0	36	1	3	10	1	100
Michel Trollé	France	1987–1988	0	18 (17)	0	1	3	2	25.5
Esteban Tuero^	Argentina	1996	0	6	0	0	0	0	0
Eric van de Poele^	Belgium	1989–1990	0	21	0	3	5	0	49
Alan van der Merwe	South Africa	2004	0	7	0	0	0	0	2
Mikke van Hool	Belgium	1994–1995	0	16 (14)	0	0	0	0	0
Jeffrey van Hooydonk	Belgium	1999–2000, 2003–2004	0	36 (33)	1	0	0	0	23
Fabiano Vandone	Italy	1991–1992	0	14 (6)	0	0	0	0	0
Gabriele Varano	Italy	2001	0	5	0	0	0	0	0
David Velay	France	1989, 1991	0	2	0	0	0	0	0
Nico Verdonck	Belgium	2004	0	10	0	0	0	0	1
Polo Villaamil	Spain	1998–1999	0	12 (3)	0	0	0	0	0
Jacques Villeneuve^	Canada	1987	0	1 (0)	0	0	0	0	0
Giorgio Vinella	Italy	1998	0	11 (7)	0	0	0	0	0
Ernesto Viso	Venezuela	2004	0	6	0	0	0	0	7
Walter Voulaz	Italy	1988	0	1 (0)	0	0	0	0	0
Fermín Vélez	Spain	1988	0	8 (4)	0	0	0	0	0
Fabrice Walfisch	France	1998–2000	0	29 (24)	1	0	1	0	4
Andy Wallace	United Kingdom	1987–1988	0	20 (18)	0	0	0	0	4.5
Mario Waltner	Austria	1997	0	2 (0)	0	0	0	0	0
Paul Warwick	United Kingdom	1990	0	4 (3)	0	0	0	0	0
Stephen Watson	South Africa	1995–1997	0	28 (27)	0	0	0	0	2
Jason Watt	Denmark	1997–1999	0	32 (31)	2	4	11	0	85
James Weaver	United Kingdom	1985–1986, 1988	0	6 (4)	0	0	0	0	0
Mark Webber^	Australia	2000–2001	0	22	2	4	7	5	60
Volker Weidler^	Germany	1986, 1988	0	18 (14)	0	0	0	0	5
Karl Wendlinger^	Austria	1990–1991	0	14 (11)	0	0	1	0	8
Justin Wilson^	United Kingdom	1999–2001	1 (2001)	32	2	3	12	1	89
Max Wilson	Brazil	1997–1999	0	31 (30)	2	0	7	0	44
Björn Wirdheim	Sweden	2002–2003	1 (2003)	22	6	4	12	7	107
Pascal Witmeur	Belgium	1991	0	1 (0)	0	0	0	0	0
Alex Yoong^	Malaysia	1999	0	4 (2)	0	0	0	0	0
Peter Zakowski	Germany	1991	0	3 (2)	0	0	0	0	0
Alessandro Zampedri	Italy	1992–1993	0	19 (18)	0	0	1	0	8
Alessandro Zanardi^	Italy	1989, 1991	0	11	3	2	6	3	42
Vittorio Zoboli	Italy	1990–1993	0	22 (17)	0	0	0	0	3
Ricardo Zonta^	Brazil	1996–1997	1 (1997)	20	5	5	9	6	66

== By nationality ==
Country	Total Drivers	Championship Titles	Race entries (Starts)	Poles	Wins	Podiums	Fastest Laps	Points
Argentina	11	0	119 (113)	0	0	3	2	64
Australia	9	0	90 (79)	2	4	9	5	80
Austria	8	0	126 (103)	0	2	11	1	123
Belgium	17	0	265 (236)	6	6	22	2	233
Brazil	31	4 (1988, 1991, 1997, 2000)	511 (472)	35	28	85	24	717
Canada	7	0	74 (61)	1	0	2	1	18
Chile	1	0	20 (14)	0	0	0	1	1.5
Colombia	1	1 (1998)	22	10	7	13	7	102.5
Czech Republic	2	0	69 (65)	8	6	16	10	169
Denmark	6	0	104 (97)	8	7	26	5	199
Finland	2	0	41 (22)	0	0	0	0	6
France	69	5 (1989, 1990, 1993, 1994, 2002)	1092 (986)	43	42	124	44	1051
Germany	21	3 (1985, 1996, 1999)	241 (194)	11	13	34	18	283 (284)
Hungary	1	0	28 (27)	0	0	0	0	7
Indonesia	1	0	13 (10)	0	0	0	0	0
Ireland	3	0	4 (3)	0	0	0	0	0
Israel	1	0	3	0	0	0	0	0
Italy	88	5 (1986, 1987, 1992, 1995, 2004)	1298 (1070)	42	50	126	45	1207.5 (1208.5)
Japan	8	0	66 (58)	0	0	1	0	13
Macau	1	0	32 (30)	0	0	2	0	15
Malaysia	1	0	4 (2)	0	0	0	0	0
Mexico	2	0	9 (3)	0	0	0	0	0
Monaco	1	0	19	1	1	1	0	20
Netherlands	6	0	58 (52)	0	1	4	1	49
New Zealand	1	0	16	5	4	7	4	55.5
Norway	1	0	10 (5)	0	0	0	0	0
Portugal	5	0	79 (71)	2	1	5	3	51
Russia	1	0	32 (17)	0	0	0	0	0
San Marino	1	0	1	0	0	0	0	0
South Africa	7	0	73 (67)	0	0	1	0	14
Spain	11	0	108 (77)	4	6	11	5	100.5
Sweden	10	1 (2003)	139 (127)	11	9	25	10	206
Switzerland	14	0	185 (127)	2	2	9	1	76
Turkey	1	0	9	0	0	0	0	0
United Kingdom	50	1 (2001)	723 (579)	14	13	63	15	462.5
United States	11	0	78 (66)	0	0	1	0	24
Uruguay	1	0	29 (27)	0	3	7	4	60.5
Venezuela	1	0	6	0	0	0	0	7
