= 1991 International Formula 3000 Championship =

Motor racing competition

1991 FIA International Formula 3000 Championship

Seasons
- ← 1990 1992 →

The 1991 Formula 3000 International Championship was the seventh season of Formula 3000 in Europe. Christian Fittipaldi won the championship after ten rounds.

== Technical changes ==
A major technical change for 1991 was the introduction by Avon of radial-ply tyres. Compared to the previous crossply tyres, these could be more consistently manufactured, and made the cars more consistent aerodynamically, but gave the drivers less control at high slip angles.

Lola's T91/50 chassis was an evolution of the previous year's championship-winning T90/50, and retained a very short wheelbase of 263.0 cm (103.5 in). By comparison, the Reynard 91D had a wheelbase of 277.5 cm (109.3 in). The short wheelbase of the Lola was blamed for its inability to perform on the new tyres, and the Forti Corse team switched to Reynards after three rounds. The Eddie Jordan Racing team attempted to lengthen its Lolas by adding a spacer in between the engine and gearbox, but eventually it too purchased a Reynard for Damon Hill.

The Ralt name, last seen in F3000 in 1988, returned after being split off from the March Group.

== Season summary ==
Alessandro Zanardi won for the new Il Barone Rampante team at the first race at Vallelunga. Jean-Marc Gounon then took Ralt's last F3000 win at Pau. Christian Fittipaldi won at Jerez, and Zanardi won again at Mugello.

Gounon won on the road at Enna, but he was controversially adjudged to have jumped the start. The race win was given to Emanuele Naspetti, who was making his first start in a Reynard after his Forti team had switched from Lolas. Naspetti then won the following three races at Hockenheim, Brands Hatch and Spa-Francorchamps. His success was blamed in part on the exotic fuel blend provided by Agip, which would be banned the following year.

Fittipaldi's Pacific teammate Antonio Tamburini won on the Bugatti Circuit at Le Mans. In the finale at Nogaro, Fittipaldi beat title rival Zanardi for the race win and the championship.

== Drivers and constructors ==
Team	Chassis	Engine	No.	Driver	Rounds
(France) DAMS	Lola	Mugen Honda	1	(United Kingdom) Allan McNish	All
(France) DAMS	Lola	Mugen Honda	2	(France) Laurent Aïello	All
(United Kingdom) GA Motorsport	Ralt	Ford Cosworth	3	(Germany) Michael Bartels	1
(United Kingdom) GA Motorsport	Ralt	Ford Cosworth	3	(Italy) Massimo Monti	2
(United Kingdom) GA Motorsport	Ralt	Ford Cosworth	4	(France) Thierry Delubac	1-2
(Italy) BFG 3000	Reynard	Mugen Honda	4	(Italy) Giovanni Bonanno	3-9
(Italy) First Racing	Reynard	Ford Cosworth	5	(Italy) Giovanni Bonanno	1
(Italy) First Racing	Reynard	Ford Cosworth	5	(Germany) Michael Bartels	2-4
(Italy) First Racing	Reynard	Ford Cosworth	6	(Switzerland) Jean-Denis Délétraz	1-3
(Italy) First Racing	Reynard	Ford Cosworth	7	(France) Éric Hélary	1-4
(United Kingdom) Paul Stewart Racing	Lola	Mugen Honda	8	(Italy) Marco Apicella	All
(United Kingdom) Paul Stewart Racing	Lola	Mugen Honda	9	(United Kingdom) Paul Stewart	All
(Italy) Forti Corse	Lola	Ford Cosworth	11	(Italy) Emanuele Naspetti	1-3
(Italy) Forti Corse	Reynard	Ford Cosworth	11	(Italy) Emanuele Naspetti	4-10
(Italy) Forti Corse	Lola	Ford Cosworth	12	(Italy) Fabrizio Giovanardi	1-3
(Italy) Forti Corse	Reynard	Ford Cosworth	12	(Italy) Fabrizio Giovanardi	4-10
(United Kingdom) Eddie Jordan Racing	Lola	Ford Cosworth	14	(United Kingdom) Damon Hill	1-9
(United Kingdom) Eddie Jordan Racing	Reynard	Ford Cosworth	14	(United Kingdom) Damon Hill	10
(United Kingdom) Eddie Jordan Racing	Lola	Ford Cosworth	15	(Italy) Vincenzo Sospiri	All
(United Kingdom) Roni Motorsport	Ralt	Ford Cosworth	16	(Mexico) Fernando Plata	1-5
(United Kingdom) Roni Motorsport	Ralt	Ford Cosworth	16	(Italy) Giovanni Lavaggi	6-10
(United Kingdom) Roni Motorsport	Ralt	Ford Cosworth	17	(Australia) David Brabham	1-4
(United Kingdom) Roni Motorsport	Ralt	Ford Cosworth	17	(United Kingdom) Andrew Gilbert-Scott	5-6
(France) Apomatox	Reynard	Ford Cosworth	18	(France) Paul Belmondo	All
(France) Apomatox	Reynard	Ford Cosworth	19	(Switzerland) Andrea Chiesa	1-8
(France) Apomatox	Reynard	Ford Cosworth	19	(France) Emmanuel Collard	9-10
(Italy) Crypton Engineering	Reynard	Ford Cosworth	20	(Italy) Roberto Colciago	All
(Italy) Crypton Engineering	Reynard	Ford Cosworth	21	(Italy) Fabrizio Barbazza	1
(Italy) Crypton Engineering	Reynard	Ford Cosworth	21	(Belgium) Pascal Witmeur	8
(Italy) Crypton Engineering	Reynard	Ford Cosworth	21	(France) Philippe Gache	10
(Italy) Crypton Engineering	Reynard	Ford Cosworth	22	(Italy) Giovanni Lavaggi	1-5
(Italy) Crypton Engineering	Reynard	Ford Cosworth	22	(Germany) Peter Zakowski	6-8
(United Kingdom) CoBRa Motorsports	Reynard	Ford Cosworth	23	(Italy) Paolo Delle Piane	All
(United Kingdom) CoBRa Motorsports	Reynard	Ford Cosworth	24	(Switzerland) Alain Menu	1-6
(United Kingdom) CoBRa Motorsports	Reynard	Ford Cosworth	24	(France) Éric Hélary	7-10
(Austria) RSM Marko	Reynard	Ford Cosworth	25	(Austria) Karl Wendlinger	3, 5-6, 8-9
(France) Galaxy Racing	Reynard	Ford Cosworth	26	(France) Philippe Gache	1-9
(France) Galaxy Racing	Reynard	Ford Cosworth	26	(France) David Velay	10
(Netherlands) Vortex Motorsport	Lola	Mugen Honda	27	(Germany) Heinz-Harald Frentzen	All
(United Kingdom) Pacific Racing	Reynard	Mugen Honda	29	(Italy) Antonio Tamburini	All
(United Kingdom) Pacific Racing	Reynard	Mugen Honda	30	(Brazil) Christian Fittipaldi	All
(United Kingdom) 3001 International	Ralt	Ford Cosworth	31	(France) Jean-Marc Gounon	All
(United Kingdom) 3001 International	Ralt	Ford Cosworth	32	(Italy) Andrea Montermini	All
(Italy) Il Barone Rampante	Reynard	Mugen Honda	33	(Italy) Alessandro Zanardi	All
(Italy) Il Barone Rampante	Reynard	Mugen Honda	34	(Italy) Giuseppe Bugatti	All
(Italy) Junior Team	Reynard	Judd	35	(Italy) Vittorio Zoboli	1-8
(Italy) Junior Team	Reynard	Judd	35	(Italy) Massimo Monti	9
(Italy) Junior Team	Reynard	Judd	36	(Argentina) Gabriel Furlán	All
(Italy) Motor Racing Di-Wheels	Leyton House	Ford Cosworth	38	(Italy) Fabiano Vandone	1-4
(Italy) Motor Racing Di-Wheels	Ralt	Ford Cosworth	38	(Italy) Fabiano Vandone	5-9
(Italy) Motor Racing Di-Wheels	Leyton House	Ford Cosworth	39	(Australia) Simon Kane	6-7
(Italy) Pavesi Racing	Reynard	Mugen Honda	40	(Italy) Felice Tedeschi	1-8
(Italy) Pavesi Racing	Reynard	Mugen Honda	40	(Italy) Massimiliano Angelelli	9
(United Kingdom) GJ Motorsport	Reynard	Ford Cosworth	41	(Italy) Giovanna Amati	All
(United Kingdom) GJ Motorsport	Reynard	Ford Cosworth	42	(United Kingdom) Dave Coyne	7

== Calendar ==
Round	Circuit	Date	Laps	Distance	Time	Speed	Pole position	Fastest lap	Winner
1	(Italy) ACI Vallelunga Circuit	14 April	60	3.2=192.0 km	1'06:05.153	174.318 km/h	(Brazil) Christian Fittipaldi	(Italy) Alessandro Zanardi	(Italy) Alessandro Zanardi
2	(France) Pau Grand Prix	19 May	73	2.76=201.48 km	1'26:31.24	137.807 km/h	(Italy) Alessandro Zanardi	(Italy) Andrea Montermini	(France) Jean-Marc Gounon
3	(Spain) Circuito de Jerez	9 June	48	4.2179=202.459 km	1'18:15.69	155.221 km/h	(Brazil) Christian Fittipaldi	(Brazil) Christian Fittipaldi	(Brazil) Christian Fittipaldi
4	(Italy) Mugello Circuit	23 June	38	5.245=199.31 km	1'03:08.380	189.399 km/h	(Italy) Alessandro Zanardi	(Italy) Alessandro Zanardi	(Italy) Alessandro Zanardi
5	(Italy) Autodromo di Pergusa	7 July	40	4.95=198.0 km	0'59:34.254	199.426 km/h	(Italy) Emanuele Naspetti	(France) Jean-Marc Gounon	(Italy) Emanuele Naspetti
6	(Germany) Hockenheimring	27 July	29	6.801=197.229 km	0'57:19.217	206.480 km/h	(Italy) Andrea Montermini	(Italy) Andrea Montermini	(Italy) Emanuele Naspetti
7	(United Kingdom) Brands Hatch	18 August	48	4.1846=200.861 km	1'00:26.28	199.40 km/h	(Italy) Alessandro Zanardi	(Italy) Emanuele Naspetti	(Italy) Emanuele Naspetti
8	(Belgium) Circuit de Spa-Francorchamps	24 August	29	6.94=201.26 km	1'03:09.82	191.180 km/h	(France) Laurent Aïello	(Italy) Emanuele Naspetti	(Italy) Emanuele Naspetti
9	(France) Bugatti Circuit	22 September	45	4.426=199.170 km	1'24:09.87	142.114 km/h	(Brazil) Christian Fittipaldi	(Italy) Antonio Tamburini	(Italy) Antonio Tamburini
10	(France) Circuit Paul Armagnac	6 October	55	3.636=199.980 km	1'14:26.15	161.196 km/h	(Brazil) Christian Fittipaldi	(Italy) Alessandro Zanardi	(Brazil) Christian Fittipaldi

== Final points standings ==
=== Driver ===
For every race points were awarded: 9 points to the winner, 6 for runner-up, 4 for third place, 3 for fourth place, 2 for fifth place and 1 for sixth place. No additional points were awarded.

Pos	Driver	VLL (Italy)	PAU (France)	JER (Spain)	MUG (Italy)	PER (Italy)	HOC (Germany)	BRH (United Kingdom)	SPA (Belgium)	BUG (France)	NOG (France)	Points
1	(Brazil) Christian Fittipaldi	2	2	1	3	Ret	4	3	Ret	2	1	47
2	(Italy) Alessandro Zanardi	1	Ret	2	1	Ret	Ret	2	2	Ret	2	42
3	(Italy) Emanuele Naspetti	10	9	DNQ	DNS	1	1	1	1	Ret	6	37
4	(Italy) Antonio Tamburini	3	10	4	7	4	6	5	Ret	1	Ret	22
5	(Italy) Marco Apicella	Ret	4	Ret	2	2	Ret	4	Ret	Ret	11	18
6	(France) Jean-Marc Gounon	DNQ	1	6	10	6	5	Ret	7	Ret	Ret	13
7	(United Kingdom) Damon Hill	4	Ret	8	Ret	11	Ret	6	Ret	4	3	11
8	(Italy) Vincenzo Sospiri	Ret	DNQ	15	4	Ret	2	16	10	Ret	13	9
9	(France) Éric Hélary	11	3	Ret	16†			15	4	Ret	5	9
10	(Italy) Andrea Montermini	Ret	Ret	3	11	10	Ret	10	Ret	3	Ret	8
11	(Italy) Giuseppe Bugatti	5	Ret	Ret	Ret	3	Ret	Ret	16	Ret	7	6
12	(Austria) Karl Wendlinger			5		Ret	3		Ret	Ret		6
13	(Italy) Fabrizio Giovanardi	12	5	DNQ	8	Ret	13†	8	6	DNS	4	6
14	(Germany) Heinz-Harald Frentzen	Ret	Ret	12	6	5	DNQ	12	5	Ret	Ret	5
15	(France) Laurent Aïello	Ret	DNS	7	Ret	Ret	7	9	3	Ret	Ret	4
16	(United Kingdom) Allan McNish	DNQ	13	DNQ	5	8	Ret	Ret	8	Ret	8	2
17	(France) Philippe Gache	DNQ	12	10	Ret	9	Ret	11	9	5	Ret	2
18	(Switzerland) Alain Menu	6	6	18	12	Ret	DNS					2
19	(Argentina) Gabriel Furlán	9	DNQ	Ret	Ret	7	8	Ret	Ret	6	Ret	1
20	(Australia) David Brabham	7	7	11	9							0
21	(United Kingdom) Paul Stewart	Ret	DNQ	16	DNQ	12	Ret	7	14	8	9	0
22	(Italy) Giovanna Amati	DNQ	Ret	DNQ	14†	Ret	9	19	DNQ	7	Ret	0
23	(Italy) Roberto Colciago	8	11	DNQ	Ret	Ret	DNQ	18	17	Ret	Ret	0
24	(Germany) Michael Bartels	DNQ	8	Ret	15							0
25	(Switzerland) Andrea Chiesa	Ret	Ret	9	DNQ	Ret	10	14	13			0
26	(Italy) Paolo Delle Piane	Ret	DNQ	17	Ret	DNQ	Ret	Ret	15	9	Ret	0
27	(France) David Velay										10	0
28	(Germany) Peter Zakowski						DNQ	Ret	11			0
29	(United Kingdom) Andrew Gilbert-Scott					DNQ	11					0
30	(France) Paul Belmondo	14	Ret	14	13	Ret	Ret	DNQ	12	Ret	Ret	0
31	(Italy) Giovanni Lavaggi	DNQ	DNQ	DNQ	DNQ	Ret	DNQ	DNQ	DNQ	DNQ	12	0
32	(Italy) Fabiano Vandone	DNQ	DNQ	DNQ	DNQ	DNQ	12	DNQ	DNQ	DNQ		0
33	(Italy) Giovanni Bonanno	Ret		13	Ret	DNQ	Ret	17	Ret	DNQ		0
34	(Italy) Vittorio Zoboli	Ret	DNQ	Ret	DNQ	Ret	DNQ	13	Ret			0
35	(Italy) Fabrizio Barbazza	13										0
36	(Italy) Felice Tedeschi	15	DNQ	Ret	Ret	Ret	Ret	DNQ	DNQ			0
	(France) Emmanuel Collard									Ret	Ret	
	(Switzerland) Jean-Denis Délétraz	DNS	DNQ	Ret								
	(Italy) Massimo Monti		DNQ							Ret		
	(United Kingdom) Dave Coyne							Ret				
	(Italy) Max Angelelli									Ret		
	(Mexico) Fernando Plata	DNQ	DNQ	DNQ	DNQ	DNQ						
	(Belgium) Thierry Delubac	DNQ	DNQ									
	(Australia) Simon Kane						DNQ	DNQ				
	(Belgium) Pascal Witmeur								DNQ			

== Complete overview ==
first column of every race	10	= grid position

second column of every race	10	= race result

R16=retired, but classified R=retired NS=did not start NQ=did not qualify

Place	Name	Team	Chassis	Engine	VLL (Italy)		PAU (France)		JER (Spain)		MUG (Italy)		PER (Italy)		HOC (Germany)		BRH (United Kingdom)		SPA (Belgium)		BUG (France)		NOG (France)
1	(Brazil) Christian Fittipaldi	Pacific Racing	Reynard	Mugen Honda	1	2	4	2	1	1	4	3	7	R	9	4	6	3	6	R	1	2	1	1
2	(Italy) Alessandro Zanardi	Il Barone Rampante	Reynard	Mugen Honda	2	1	1	R	2	2	1	1	2	R	4	R	1	2	3	2	3	R	2	2
3	(Italy) Emanuele Naspetti	Forti Corse	Lola	Ford Cosworth	16	10	15	9	29	NQ
3	(Italy) Emanuele Naspetti	Forti Corse	Reynard	Ford Cosworth							8	NS	1	1	8	1	3	1	2	1	6	R	14	6
4	(Italy) Antonio Tamburini	Pacific Racing	Reynard	Mugen Honda	4	3	13	10	3	4	9	7	14	4	10	6	10	5	19	R	2	1	13	R
5	(Italy) Marco Apicella	Paul Stewart Racing	Lola	Mugen Honda	19	R	6	4	9	R	3	2	3	2	13	R	2	4	15	R	12	R	18	11
6	(France) Jean-Marc Gounon	3001 International	Ralt	Ford Cosworth	30	NQ	3	1	7	6	25	10	4	6	3	5	16	R	10	7	13	R	12	R
7	(United Kingdom) Damon Hill	Jordan Racing	Lola	Ford Cosworth	9	4	10	R	15	8	6	R	9	11	7	R	4	6	13	R	10	4
7	(United Kingdom) Damon Hill	Jordan Racing	Reynard	Ford Cosworth																			3	3
8	(Italy) Vincenzo Sospiri	Jordan Racing	Lola	Ford Cosworth	10	R	25	NQ	19	15	5	4	15	R	5	2	8	16	18	10	14	R	20	13
	(France) Éric Hélary	First Racing	Reynard	Ford Cosworth	14	11	7	3	16	R	17	R16	-	-	-	-
	(France) Éric Hélary	CoBra Motorsports	Reynard	Ford Cosworth													21	15	5	4	19	R	11	5
10	(Italy) Andrea Montermini	3001 International	Ralt	Ford Cosworth	17	R	2	R	4	3	21	11	6	10	1	R	17	10	8	R	16	3	8	R
11	(Italy) Giuseppe Bugatti	Il Barone Rampante	Reynard	Mugen Honda	7	5	20	R	8	R	2	R	5	3	21	R	5	R	12	16	8	R	5	7
	(Austria) Karl Wendlinger	RSM Marko	Reynard	Ford Cosworth	-	-	-	-	5	5	-	-	8	R	2	3	-	-	4	R	5	R	-	-
	(Italy) Fabrizio Giovanardi	Forti Corse	Lola	Ford Cosworth	23	12	8	5	28	NQ
	(Italy) Fabrizio Giovanardi	Forti Corse	Reynard	Ford Cosworth							15	8	20	R	15	R13	7	8	9	6	26	NS	7	4
14	(Germany) Heinz-Harald Frentzen	Vortex	Lola	Mugen Honda	6	R	5	R	21	12	7	6	10	5	32	NQ	22	12	7	5	22	R	9	R
15	(France) Laurent Aïello	DAMS	Lola	Mugen Honda	3	R	14	NS	6	7	10	R	13	R	17	7	13	9	1	3	4	R	6	R
16	(Switzerland) Alain Menu	CoBRa Motorsports	Reynard	Ford Cosworth	5	6	12	6	12	18	16	12	12	R	12	NS	-	-	-	-	-	-	-	-
	(United Kingdom) Allan McNish	DAMS	Lola	Mugen Honda	34	NQ	19	13	27	NQ	12	5	21	8	6	R	11	R	11	8	11	R	17	8
	(France) Philippe Gache	Galaxy Racing	Lola	Ford Cosworth	29	NQ	22	12	18	10	19	R	26	9	20	R	15	11	23	9	20	5
	(France) Philippe Gache	Crypton Engineering	Reynard	Ford Cosworth																			4	R
19	(Argentina) Gabriel Furlán	Junior Team	Reynard	Judd	13	9	28	NQ	20	R	24	R	19	7	24	8	12	R	17	R	18	6	16	R
-	(Australia) David Brabham	Roni Team/Team Ralt	Ralt	Ford Cosworth	8	7	9	7	22	11	13	9	-	-	-	-	-	-	-	-	-	-	-	-
-	(United Kingdom) Paul Stewart	Paul Stewart Racing	Lola	Mugen Honda	24	R	23	NQ	24	16	28	NQ	24	12	18	R	9	7	16	14	17	8	21	9
-	(Italy) Giovanna Amati	GJ Motorsports	Reynard	Ford Cosworth	28	NQ	21	R	31	NQ	23	R14	18	R	11	9	19	19	28	NQ	25	7	22	R
-	(Italy) Roberto Colciago	Crypton Engineering	Reynard	Ford Cosworth	11	8	18	11	34	NQ	22	R	17	R	27	NQ	20	18	21	17	9	R	10	R
-	(Germany) Michael Bartels	GA Motorsports	Ralt	Ford Cosworth	32	NQ
-	(Germany) Michael Bartels	First Racing	Reynard	Ford Cosworth			11	8	10	R	14	15	-	-	-	-	-	-	-	-	-	-	-	-
-	(Switzerland) Andrea Chiesa	Apomatox	Reynard	Ford Cosworth	20	R	17	R	11	9	30	NQ	11	R	16	10	24	14	22	13	-	-	-	-
-	(Italy) Paolo Delle Piane	CoBRaMotorsports	Reynard	Ford Cosworth	12	R	31	NQ	26	17	26	R	30	NQ	22	R	23	R	26	15	23	9	19	R
-	(France) David Velay	Galaxy Racing	Lola	Ford Cosworth	-	-	-	-	-	-	-	-	-	-	-	-	-	-	-	-	-	-	24	10
-	(Germany) Peter Zakowski	Crypton Engineering	Reynard	Ford Cosworth	-	-	-	-	-	-	-	-	-	-	29	NQ	25	R	25	11	-	-	-	-
-	(United Kingdom) Andrew Gilbert-Scott	Roni Team/Team Ralt	Ralt	Ford Cosworth	-	-	-	-	-	-	-	-	28	NQ	26	11	-	-	-	-	-	-	-	-
-	(France) Paul Belmondo	Apomatox	Reynard	Ford Cosworth	25	14	16	R	25	14	11	13	16	R	14	R	27	NQ	20	12	15	R	23	R
-	(Italy) Giovanni Lavaggi	Crypton Engineering	Reynard	Ford Cosworth	27	NQ	32	NQ	32	NQ	29	NQ	23	R
-	(Italy) Giovanni Lavaggi	Roni Team/Team Ralt	Ralt	Ford Cosworth											30	NQ	28	NQ	27	NQ	27	NQ	25	12
-	(Italy) Fabiano Vandone	Motor Racing Di-Wheels	Leyton House	Judd	31	NQ
-	(Italy) Fabiano Vandone	Motor Racing Di-Wheels	Leyton House	Ford Cosworth			34	NQ	33	NQ	32	NQ
-	(Italy) Fabiano Vandone	Motor Racing Di-Wheels	Ralt	Ford Cosworth									29	NQ	23	12	30	NQ	30	NQ	28	NQ	-	-
-	(Italy) Giovanni Bonanno	First Racing	Reynard	Ford Cosworth	22	R	-	-
-	(Italy) Giovanni Bonanno	BG F3000	Reynard	Mugen Honda					23	13	20	R	27	NQ	25	R	26	17	14	R	29	NQ	-	-
-	(Italy) Vittorio Zoboli	Junior Team	Reynard	Judd	26	R	27	NQ	17	R	27	NQ	22	R	28	NQ	18	13	24	R	-	-	-	-
-	(Italy) Fabrizio Barbazza	Crypton Engineering	Reynard	Ford Cosworth	18	13	-	-	-	-	-	-	-	-	-	-	-	-	-	-	-	-	-	-
-	(Italy) Felice Tedeschi	Pavesi Racing	Reynard	Mugen Honda	21	15	30	NQ	14	R	18	R	25	R	19	R	29	NQ	29	NQ	-	-	-	-
-	(France) Emmanuel Collard	Apomatox	Reynard	Ford Cosworth	-	-	-	-	-	-	-	-	-	-	-	-	-	-	-	-	7	R	15	R
-	(Switzerland) Jean-Denis Délétraz	First Racing	Reynard	Ford Cosworth	15	NS	24	NQ	13	R	-	-	-	-	-	-	-	-	-	-	-	-	-	-
-	(Italy) Massimo Monti	GA Motorsports	Ralt	Ford Cosworth	-	-	29	NQ	-	-	-	-	-	-	-	-	-	-	-	-
-	(Italy) Massimo Monti	Junior Team	Reynard	Judd																	21	R	-	-
-	(United Kingdom) Dave Coyne	GJ Motorsports	Reynard	Ford Cosworth	-	-	-	-	-	-	-	-	-	-	-	-	14	R	-	-	-	-	-	-
-	(Italy) Max Angelelli	Pavesi Racing	Reynard	Mugen Honda	-	-	-	-	-	-	-	-	-	-	-	-	-	-	-	-	24	R	-	-
-	(Mexico) Fernando Plata	Roni Team/Team Ralt	Ralt	Ford Cosworth	35	NQ	33	NQ	30	NQ	31	NQ	31	NQ	-	-	-	-	-	-	-	-	-	-
-	(Belgium) Thierry Delubac	GA Motorsports	Ralt	Ford Cosworth	33	NQ	26	NQ	-	-	-	-	-	-	-	-	-	-	-	-	-	-	-	-
-	(Australia) Simon Kane	Motor Racing Di-Wheels	Leyton House	Ford Cosworth	-	-	-	-	-	-	-	-	-	-	31	NQ	31	NQ	-	-	-	-	-	-
-	(Belgium) Pascal Witmeur	Crypton Engineering	Reynard	Ford Cosworth	-	-	-	-	-	-	-	-	-	-	-	-	-	-	31	NQ	-	-	-	-
