= 1993 International Formula 3000 Championship =

Motor racing competition

The 1993 FIA Formula 3000 International Championship was a motor racing series for Formula 3000 cars. Contested over nine races, it was the ninth FIA Formula 3000 International Championship.

French driver, Olivier Panis won the championship driving a Reynard 93D for the French DAMS team.

== Technical changes ==
The 1993 Championship was the first to feature only one make of chassis, although the rules were still open to multiple manufacturers. Ralt had already ceased involvement in F3000 in 1992. After two poor seasons, Lola had no European customers after their two French teams, DAMS and Apomatox, switched to Reynards. Lolas would continue to have success in Japan, and would return to Europe in 1994.

In 1992, the manufacturers had agreed to a two-year cycle for chassis development for the first time, with the intention of reducing costs. Several teams, including the previous champions Crypton, kept their Reynard 92D cars. The new 93D featured a manual sequential gearbox, as opposed to the H-pattern found on the previous car, along with aerodynamic and suspension improvements.

Cosworth introduced a new low-crank engine, the AC, to compete with the Judd KV. Several teams retained the old DFV, which would score its last major victory at Pau. For the first time since 1988, there were no Mugen Honda engines in Europe.

== Season summary ==
Olivier Beretta joined the Forti Corse team for 1993, and won the opening round at Donington Park. Reigning British Formula 3 Champion Gil de Ferran then won at Silverstone. The Pau Grand Prix was marked by the usual first-lap crash at the Lyceé hairpin, followed by another on the pit straight as several drivers were unable to see the red flags. Pedro Lamy won the restarted race, giving the DFV its last major victory.

Enna produced the usual crashes, as well as a fine battle for the lead between Lamy and eventual winner David Coulthard. Frenchman Olivier Panis then won both German rounds and at Spa-Francorchamps in Belgium.

A rain shower caused havoc at Magny-Cours. Panis lost the lead due to a stuck wheel nut when he pitted for rain tires. His DAMS teammate Franck Lagorce picked up the win.

Going into the final round at Nogaro, Panis led Lamy by a single point. Coulthard also had an outside chance at the title, but he retired after only a few corners. Later on the opening lap, Panis was taken out by Vincenzo Sospiri, and had to be restrained from attacking the Italian in the pitlane. Shortly thereafter, though, Lamy came into the pits with damaged rear suspension. His team would repair it, but he lost several laps. With all three contenders eliminated in the opening laps, Panis celebrated from the pit wall as his teammate Lagorce won from the two Apomatox cars of Boullion and Collard.

== Drivers and teams ==
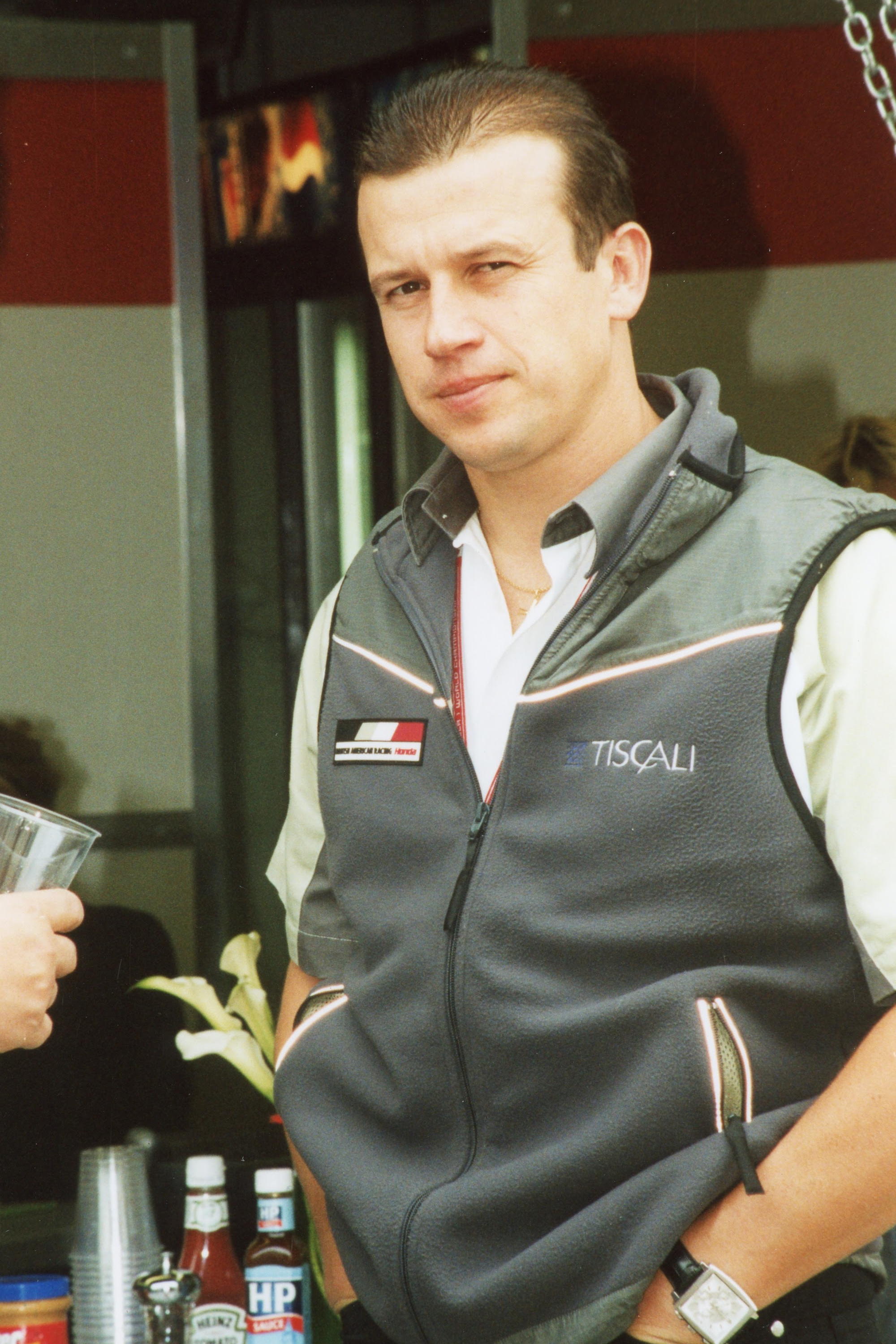
Olivier Panis (pictured in 2002) won the championship driving for DAMS.

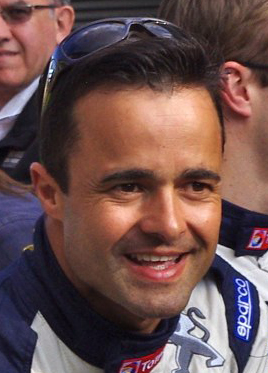
Pedro Lamy (pictured in 2011) placed second driving for Crypton Engineering.

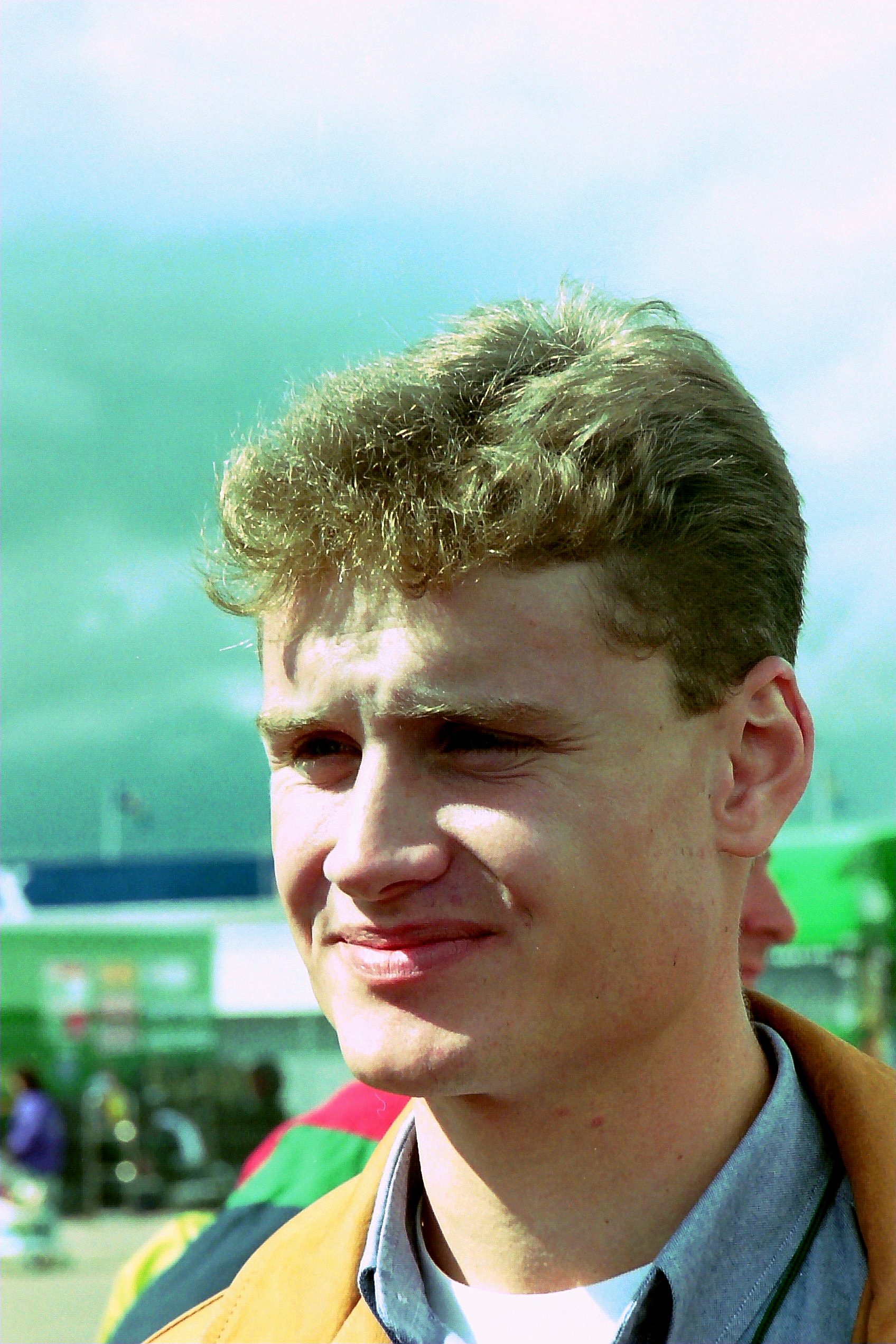
David Coulthard placed third driving for Pacific Racing.

The following drivers and teams competed in the championship.

Team	Chassis	Engine	No.	Driver	Rounds
(Italy) Crypton Engineering	Reynard 92D	Ford Cosworth DFV	1	(Portugal) Pedro Lamy	All
(Italy) Crypton Engineering	Reynard 92D	Ford Cosworth DFV	2	(Italy) Guido Knycz	1-7
(Italy) Crypton Engineering	Reynard 92D	Ford Cosworth DFV	2	(France) Nicolas Leboissetier	8-9
(Italy) Forti Corse	Reynard 93D	Ford Cosworth DFV	3	(Monaco) Olivier Beretta	All
(Italy) Forti Corse	Reynard 93D	Ford Cosworth DFV	4	(Brazil) Pedro Diniz	All
(Italy) Il Barone Rampante	Reynard 93D	Ford Cosworth AC	5	(France) Éric Angelvy	1-5
(Italy) Il Barone Rampante	Reynard 93D	Ford Cosworth AC	6	(Netherlands) Jan Lammers	1-6
(Italy) Il Barone Rampante	Reynard 92D	Ford Cosworth DFV	7	(Italy) Vittorio Zoboli	1-4
(United Kingdom) Pacific Racing	Reynard 93D	Ford Cosworth AC	8	(United Kingdom) David Coulthard	All
(United Kingdom) Pacific Racing	Reynard 93D	Ford Cosworth AC	9	(Germany) Michael Bartels	1-7
(United Kingdom) Pacific Racing	Reynard 93D	Ford Cosworth AC	9	(United Kingdom) Phil Andrews	8-9
(France) Apomatox	Reynard 93D	Ford Cosworth DFV	10	(France) Emmanuel Collard	All
(France) Apomatox	Reynard 93D	Ford Cosworth DFV	11	(France) Jean-Christophe Boullion	All
(France) DAMS	Reynard 93D	Ford Cosworth AC	14	(France) Olivier Panis	All
(France) DAMS	Reynard 93D	Ford Cosworth AC	15	(France) Franck Lagorce	All
(United Kingdom) Paul Stewart Racing	Reynard 93D	Ford Cosworth AC	16	(United Kingdom) Paul Stewart	All
(United Kingdom) Paul Stewart Racing	Reynard 93D	Ford Cosworth AC	17	(Brazil) Gil de Ferran	All
(Netherlands) Vortex Motorsport	Reynard 93D	Ford Cosworth AC	20	(Italy) Massimiliano Papis	All
(Netherlands) Vortex Motorsport	Reynard 93D	Ford Cosworth AC	21	(Italy) Paolo Delle Piane	All
(United Kingdom) CoBRa Motorsports	Reynard 92D	Ford Cosworth DFV	22	(Italy) Andrea Gilardi	3-6
(United Kingdom) Apache Racing	Reynard 92D	Ford Cosworth DFV	22	(United Kingdom) Dominic Chappell	8-9
(United Kingdom) East Essex Racing	Reynard 92D	Ford Cosworth DFV	25	(United Kingdom) Mark Albon	1
(Italy) Durango	Reynard 92D	Ford Cosworth DFV	25	(Italy) Domenico Gitto	4-5
(Italy) Durango	Reynard 92D	Ford Cosworth DFV	25	(Italy) Severino Nardozzi	6-9
(France) European Technique	Reynard 92D	Ford Cosworth DFV	26	(France) Giuseppe Bugatti	3-7
(France) European Technique	Reynard 92D	Ford Cosworth DFV	26	(Brazil) Constantino de Oliveira Jr.	8-9
(France) European Technique	Reynard 92D	Ford Cosworth DFV	27	(United Kingdom) Phil Andrews	8-9
(Japan) TOM'S Racing Team	Reynard 93D	Ford Cosworth DFV	30	(Japan) Hideki Noda	1-3, 4-9
(Italy) Mythos Racing	Reynard 93D	Judd KV	31	(Italy) Giampiero Simoni	All
(Italy) Mythos Racing	Reynard 93D	Judd KV	32	(Italy) Vincenzo Sospiri	All
(United Kingdom) Nordic Racing	Reynard 93D	Ford Cosworth AC	33	(Italy) Alessandro Zampedri	All
(United Kingdom) Omegaland	Reynard 92D	Judd KV	35	(France) Yvan Muller	All
(United Kingdom) Omegaland	Reynard 92D	Judd KV	36	(France) Jérôme Policand	All
(United Kingdom) PTM 3000	Reynard 93D	Ford Cosworth AC	38	(Brazil) Constantino de Oliveira Jr.	1-7
(United Kingdom) PTM 3000	Reynard 92D	Judd KV	39	(United Kingdom) Phil Andrews	1
(United Kingdom) Tom Walkinshaw Racing	Reynard 93D	Ford Cosworth AC	39	(Spain) Jordi Gené	4-9
(Germany) Mönninghoff Racing	Reynard 92D	Ford Cosworth DFV	40	(Italy) Antonio Tamburini	1-3
(Germany) Mönninghoff Racing	Reynard 92D	Ford Cosworth DFV	41	(Germany) Klaus Panchyrz	1-2
(United Kingdom) Automotive Consultancy	Reynard 92D	Ford Cosworth DFV	42	(South Africa) Hilton Cowie	1-2
(United Kingdom) Automotive Consultancy	Reynard 92D	Ford Cosworth DFV	42	(Italy) Enrico Bertaggia	3-9

== Calendar ==
The championship was contested over nine races.

Round	Event	Circuit	Date	Laps	Distance	Time	Speed	Pole position	Fastest lap	Winner
1	Tom Wheatcroft Cup	(United Kingdom) Donington Park	3 May	46	4.023=185.058 km	1'03:01.35	178.15 km/h	(Monaco) Olivier Beretta	(Brazil) Gil de Ferran	(Monaco) Olivier Beretta
2	BRDC International Trophy	(United Kingdom) Silverstone Circuit	9 May	37	5.226=193.362 km	1'00:20.32	192.25 km/h	(Brazil) Gil de Ferran	(United Kingdom) David Coulthard	(Brazil) Gil de Ferran
3	Grand Prix de Pau	(France) Pau Grand Prix	30 May	72	2.78=200.16 km	1'25:55.83	138.753 km/h	(Portugal) Pedro Lamy	(France) Olivier Panis	(Portugal) Pedro Lamy
4	Gran Premio del Mediterraneo	(Italy) Autodromo di Pergusa	17 July	37	4.95=183.15 km	0'53:47.528	204.286 km/h	(Germany) Michael Bartels	(United Kingdom) David Coulthard	(United Kingdom) David Coulthard
5	Hockenheim F3000	(Germany) Hockenheimring	24 July	26	6.815=177.19 km	0'51:01.607	208.349 km/h	(Portugal) Pedro Lamy	(France) Olivier Panis	(France) Olivier Panis
6	Nürburgring F3000	(Germany) Nürburgring	22 August	45	4.542=204.39 km	1'26:52.13	183.394 km/h	(France) Olivier Panis	(Portugal) Pedro Lamy	(France) Olivier Panis
7	Spa-Francorchamps F3000	(Belgium) Circuit de Spa-Francorchamps	29 August	29	6.974=202.246 km	1'01:57.34	195.862 km/h	(France) Olivier Panis	(Portugal) Pedro Lamy	(France) Olivier Panis
8	Magny-Cours F3000	(France) Circuit de Nevers Magny-Cours	3 October	47	4.25=199.750 km	1'17:20.577	154.959 km/h	(France) Emmanuel Collard	(France) Franck Lagorce	(France) Franck Lagorce
9	Grand Prix de Nogaro	(France) Circuit Paul Armagnac	10 October	55	3.636=199.980 km	1'14:44.597	160.533 km/h	(France) Franck Lagorce	(France) Jean-Christophe Boullion	(France) Franck Lagorce

== Points system ==
For every race points were awarded: 9 points for first place, 6 for second place, 4 for third place, 3 for fourth place, 2 for fifth place and 1 for sixth place. All results were taken into consideration in determining the title.

== Championship standings ==
Pos	Driver	DON (United Kingdom)	SIL (United Kingdom)	PAU (France)	PER (Italy)	HOC (Germany)	NÜR (Germany)	SPA (Belgium)	MAG (France)	NOG (France)	Points
1	(France) Olivier Panis	3	6	Ret	Ret	1	1	1	10†	Ret	32
2	(Portugal) Pedro Lamy	2	DNS	1	8†	2	4	4	3	16	31
3	(United Kingdom) David Coulthard	13†	2	2	1	Ret	7	3	Ret	Ret	25
4	(France) Franck Lagorce	8	4	7	11	DNS	11	10	1	1	21
5	(Brazil) Gil de Ferran	Ret	1	Ret	Ret	9†	2	2	Ret	7	21
6	(Monaco) Olivier Beretta	1	10	4	Ret	4	5	13	9	4	20
7	(Italy) Vincenzo Sospiri	Ret	Ret	6	2	3	6	5	5	Ret	16
8	(France) Jean-Christophe Boullion	7	Ret	Ret	Ret	Ret	9	Ret	2	2	12
9	(United Kingdom) Paul Stewart	5	5	3	Ret	DNS	Ret	6	6	Ret	10
10	(Italy) Massimiliano Papis	4	Ret	5	Ret	Ret	15	Ret	Ret	6	6
11	(France) Jérôme Policand	12	7	Ret	3	Ret	13	7	7†	18	4
12	(France) Emmanuel Collard	10	Ret	Ret	9	Ret	8	8	Ret	3	4
13	(Italy) Alessandro Zampedri	Ret	DSQ	DNQ	Ret	Ret	3	Ret	Ret	10	4
14	(Germany) Michael Bartels	Ret	3	Ret	Ret	Ret	Ret	Ret			4
15	(Netherlands) Jan Lammers	9	9	10	4	7	Ret				3
16	(France) Nicolas Leboissetier								4	8	3
17	(Italy) Paolo Delle Piane	Ret	8	Ret	Ret	5	Ret	9	Ret	Ret	2
18	(France) Yvan Muller	Ret	Ret	Ret	Ret	Ret	Ret	11	Ret	5	2
19	(Italy) Enrico Bertaggia			DNQ	5	DNQ	20	Ret	Ret	12	2
20	(Italy) Andrea Gilardi			8	6	6	14				2
21	(Italy) Giampiero Simoni	6	Ret	Ret	Ret	Ret	12	Ret	Ret	9	1
22	(Brazil) Pedro Diniz	Ret	Ret	DNQ	7	Ret	16	14	11	14	0
23	(Spain) Jordi Gené				Ret	8	10	12	Ret	Ret	0
24	(Brazil) Constantino de Oliveira Jr.	Ret	Ret	DNQ	DNQ	Ret	17	17	8†	15	0
25	(Japan) Hideki Noda	Ret	11	9		Ret	19	15	Ret	11	0
26	(Italy) Guido Knycz	DNQ	13	DNQ	10	Ret	18	16			0
27	(Italy) Antonio Tamburini	11	Ret	Ret							0
28	(Italy) Vittorio Zoboli	Ret	12	DNQ	Ret						0
29	(United Kingdom) Dominic Chappell								12	Ret	0
30	(Italy) Domenico Gitto				12	DNQ					0
31	(United Kingdom) Phil Andrews	14							Ret	13	0
32	(Italy) Severino Nardozzi						DNQ	18	Ret	17	0
	(Germany) Klaus Panchyrz	DNQ	NC								
	(Italy) Giuseppe Bugatti			Ret	Ret	Ret	Ret	Ret			
	(France) Éric Angelvy	Ret	Ret	Ret	DNQ	Ret					
	(United Kingdom) Mark Albon	Ret									
	(South Africa) Hilton Cowie	DNQ	DNQ								

== Complete overview ==
first column of every race	10	= grid position

second column of every race	10	= race result

R10=retired, but classified NC=not classified R=retired NS=did not start NQ=did not qualify DIS(6)=disqualified after finishing in sixth place

Place	Name	Team	Chassis	Engine	DON (United Kingdom)		SIL (United Kingdom)		PAU (France)		PER (Italy)		HOC (Germany)		NÜR (Germany)		SPA (Belgium)		MAG (France)		NOG (France)
1	(France) Olivier Panis	DAMS	Reynard	Ford Cosworth	5	3	5	6	2	R	23	R	2	1	1	1	1	1	2	R10	2	R
2	(Portugal) Pedro Lamy	Crypton Engineering	Reynard	Ford Cosworth	4	2	6	NS	1	1	4	R8	1	2	2	4	2	4	8	3	12	16
3	(United Kingdom) David Coulthard	Pacific Racing	Reynard	Ford Cosworth	13	R13	9	2	6	2	2	1	5	R	6	7	3	3	7	R	8	R
4	(Brazil) Gil de Ferran	Paul Stewart Racing	Reynard	Ford Cosworth	2	R	1	1	11	R	18	R	6	R9	3	2	4	2	4	R	10	7
	(France) Franck Lagorce	DAMS	Reynard	Ford Cosworth	8	8	12	4	3	7	20	11	16	NS	15	11	12	10	6	1	1	1
6	(Monaco) Olivier Beretta	Forti Corse	Reynard	Ford Cosworth	1	1	4	10	15	4	3	R	4	4	7	5	11	13	11	9	6	4
7	(Italy) Vincenzo Sospiri	Mythos Racing	Reynard	Judd	7	R	11	R	4	6	7	2	8	3	10	6	5	5	18	5	5	R
8	(France) Jean-Christophe Boullion	Apomatox	Reynard	Ford Cosworth	9	7	10	R	17	R	6	R	19	R	12	9	14	R	3	2	3	2
9	(United Kingdom) Paul Stewart	Paul Stewart Racing	Reynard	Ford Cosworth	2	5	3	5	8	3	5	R	20	NS	9	R	8	6	5	6	14	R
10	(Italy) Massimiliano Papis	Vortex	Reynard	Ford Cosworth	10	4	18	R	12	5	15	R	22	R	8	15	17	R	12	R	9	6
11	(Germany) Michael Bartels	Pacific Racing	Reynard	Ford Cosworth	18	R	2	3	7	R	1	R	7	R	16	R	7	R	-	-	-	-
	(France) Jérôme Policand	Omegaland	Reynard	Judd	23	12	7	7	18	R	11	3	21	R	20	13	10	7	24	R7	15	18
	(Italy) Alessandro Zampedri	Nordic Racing	Reynard	Ford Cosworth	12	R	8	DIS(6)	27	NQ	12	R	15	R	14	3	6	R	10	R	11	10
	(France) Emmanuel Collard	Apomatox	Reynard	Ford Cosworth	14	10	19	R	20	R	8	9	12	R	21	8	15	8	1	R	4	3
15	(Netherlands) Jan Lammers	Il Barone Rampante	Reynard	Ford Cosworth	15	9	15	9	10	10	22	4	9	7	4	R	-	-	-	-	-	-
	(France) Nicolas Leboissetier	Crypton Engineering	Reynard	Ford Cosworth	-	-	-	-	-	-	-	-	-	-	-	-	-	-	20	4	17	8
17	(Italy) Enrico Bertaggia	ACE Racing	Reynard	Ford Cosworth	-	-	-	-	23	NQ	26	5	27	NQ	26	20	24	R	21	R	23	12
	(Italy) Paolo Delle Piane	Vortex	Reynard	Ford Cosworth	17	R	17	8	13	R	13	R	11	5	11	R	16	9	14	R	16	R
	(Italy) Andrea Gilardi	CoBRa Motorsports	Reynard	Ford Cosworth	-	-	-	-	19	8	24	6	25	6	24	14	-	-	-	-	-	-
	(France) Yvan Muller	Omegaland	Reynard	Judd	16	R	20	R	21	R	17	R	17	R	13	R	18	11	15	R	13	5
21	(Italy) Giampiero Simoni	Mythos Racing	Reynard	Judd	6	6	13	R	9	R	10	R	3	R	17	12	9	R	9	R	7	9
-	(Brazil) Pedro Diniz	Forti Corse	Reynard	Ford Cosworth	20	R	14	R	26	NQ	21	7	26	R	19	16	23	14	22	11	21	14
-	(Spain) Jordi Gené	TWR 3000	Reynard	Ford Cosworth	-	-	-	-	-	-	9	R	13	R8	18	10	19	12	13	R	19	R
-	(Brazil) Constantino de Oliveira Jr.	PTM 3000	Reynard	Ford Cosworth	24	R	16	R	24	NQ	27	NQ	14	R	22	17	20	17
-	(Brazil) Constantino de Oliveira Jr.	European Technique	Reynard	Ford Cosworth															16	8	18	15
-	(Japan) Hideki Noda	TOM's	Reynard	Ford Cosworth	11	R	21	11	22	9	-	-	18	R	25	19	21	15	19	R	22	11
-	(Italy) Guido Knycz	Crypton Engineering	Reynard	Ford Cosworth	27	NQ	26	13	28	NQ	16	10	24	R	23	18	22	16	-	-	-	-
-	(Italy) Antonio Tamburini	Mönnighoff Racing	Reynard	Ford Cosworth	19	11	24	R	16	R	-	-	-	-	-	-	-	-	-	-	-	-
-	(Italy) Vittorio Zoboli	Il Barone Rampante	Reynard	Ford Cosworth	25	R	23	12	25	NQ	19	R	-	-	-	-	-	-	-	-	-	-
-	(United Kingdom) Dominic Chappell	Apache Racing	Reynard	Ford Cosworth	-	-	-	-	-	-	-	-	-	-	-	-	-	-	23	12	24	R
-	(Italy) Domenico Gitto	Durango	Reynard	Ford Cosworth	-	-	-	-	-	-	25	12	28	NQ	-	-	-	-	-	-	-	-
-	(United Kingdom) Phil Andrews	PTM 3000	Reynard	Judd	26	14	-	-	-	-	-	-	-	-	-	-	-	-
-	(United Kingdom) Phil Andrews	European Technique	Reynard	Ford Cosworth															17	R	20	13
-	(Italy) Severino Nardozzi	Durango	Reynard	Ford Cosworth	-	-	-	-	-	-	-	-	-	-	27	NQ	25	18	25	R	25	17
-	(Germany) Klaus Panchyrz	Mönnighoff Racing	Reynard	Ford Cosworth	29	NQ	25	NC	-	-	-	-	-	-	-	-	-	-	-	-	-	-
-	(Italy) Giuseppe Bugatti	European Technique	Reynard	Ford Cosworth	-	-	-	-	14	R	14	R	10	R	5	R	13	R	-	-	-	-
-	(France) Éric Angelvy	Il Barone Rampante	Reynard	Ford Cosworth	22	R	22	R	5	R	28	NQ	23	R	-	-	-	-	-	-	-	-
-	(United Kingdom) Mark Albon	East Essex Racing	Reynard	Ford Cosworth	21	R	-	-	-	-	-	-	-	-	-	-	-	-	-	-	-	-
-	(South Africa) Hilton Cowie	Automotive Consultancy	Reynard	Ford Cosworth	28	NQ	27	NQ	-	-	-	-	-	-	-	-	-	-	-	-	-	-
