= 1992 International Formula 3000 Championship =

Motor racing competition

The 1992 Formula 3000 International Championship was the eighth season of Formula 3000 in Europe. Luca Badoer won the ten-round championship.

== Technical changes ==
Reynard was once again the dominant manufacturer. After Lola failed to win a race in 1991, there were only six of their cars on the grid in 1992. Simtek produced an upgrade of the previous year's RALT. Two cars were produced and sold to Piquet Racing, however after a test by Nelson Piquet himself they were sold in favor of a Reynard. Piemme Motors bought one car for Giambattista Busi, who usually started near the back of the grid and never managed to finish a race. The other car was sold to Japan, and RALT announced its withdrawal from F3000 early in the season.

Exotic fuel blends were banned after Agip's success in 1991. A stricter interpretation of the rules gave the cars long sidepods, which greatly increased the area of the flat floor, making the cars very sensitive to pitch changes.

== Season summary ==
Jordi Gené won on his debut at the Silverstone, which would turn out to be his only F3000 victory. Emanuele Naspetti won on the streets of Pau in spite of a collision with Andrea Montermini. Both continued, but Montermini later crashed at the Foch statue. Montermini won the next race in Barcelona.

At Enna, the Crypton team introduced a monodamper front suspension, and their driver Luca Badoer took the victory. He then won the next two rounds in Germany as other teams scrambled to catch up, either by switching to the dominant Mader-tuned Cosworth DFVs or with monodampers, now available as an upgrade from Reynard.

At Spa-Francorchamps, Badoer suffered a high-speed accident at Radillion. His car went into the barriers backwards, and Badoer's head hit the steel roll hoop, which broke his helmet and knocked him unconscious. Montermini took the victory, and followed this with a win on F3000's only visit to the twisty Albacete circuit in Spain.

At Nogaro, Badoer took pole position drove away to a convincing victory to clinch the title with a round to spare. In the finale, Badoer and Montermini collided, leaving Jean-Marc Gounon to take Lola's only victory of the year, followed by Olivier Panis in another Lola and David Coulthard.

== Drivers and teams ==
Team	Chassis	Engine	No.	Driver	Rounds
(United Kingdom) Pacific Racing	Reynard 92D	Mugen Honda	1	(France) Laurent Aïello	All
(United Kingdom) Pacific Racing	Reynard 92D	Mugen Honda	2	(Spain) Jordi Gené	All
(Italy) Forti Corse	Reynard 92D	Ford Cosworth	3	(Italy) Emanuele Naspetti	1-6
(Italy) Forti Corse	Reynard 92D	Ford Cosworth	3	(Italy) Andrea Montermini	7-10
(Italy) Forti Corse	Reynard 92D	Ford Cosworth	4	(Italy) Alessandro Zampedri	All
(Brazil) Piquet Racing	Reynard 92D	Mugen Honda	5	(Monaco) Olivier Beretta	1-6
(Brazil) Piquet Racing	Reynard 92D	Ford Cosworth	5	(Monaco) Olivier Beretta	7-10
(France) DAMS	Lola T92/50	Ford Cosworth	6	(France) Frédéric Gosparini	1-7
(France) DAMS	Lola T92/50	Ford Cosworth	6	(France) Éric Hélary	8
(France) DAMS	Lola T92/50	Ford Cosworth	6	(France) Jérôme Policand	9-10
(France) DAMS	Lola T92/50	Ford Cosworth	7	(France) Jean-Marc Gounon	All
(Italy) Il Barone Rampante	Reynard 92D	Judd	8	(Italy) Andrea Montermini	1-5
(Italy) Il Barone Rampante	Reynard 92D	Ford Cosworth	8	(Italy) Andrea Montermini	6
(Italy) Il Barone Rampante	Reynard 92D	Ford Cosworth	8	(Portugal) Pedro Chaves	7-10
(Italy) Il Barone Rampante	Reynard 92D	Judd	9	(Brazil) Rubens Barrichello	1-5
(Italy) Il Barone Rampante	Reynard 92D	Ford Cosworth	9	(Brazil) Rubens Barrichello	6-10
(Italy) Il Barone Rampante	Reynard 92D	Judd	10	(Italy) Fabiano Vandone	1-5
(Italy) Il Barone Rampante	Reynard 92D	Judd	10	(Italy) Giampiero Simoni	6-10
(United Kingdom) 3001 International	Reynard 92D	Mugen Honda	14	(Japan) Hideki Noda	All
(United Kingdom) 3001 International	Reynard 92D	Mugen Honda	15	(United Kingdom) Allan McNish	1, 3-8
(United Kingdom) 3001 International	Reynard 92D	Mugen Honda	15	(Australia) Mark Skaife	9-10
(United Kingdom) Paul Stewart Racing	Reynard 92D	Judd	17	(United Kingdom) Paul Stewart	All
(United Kingdom) Paul Stewart Racing	Reynard 92D	Judd	18	(United Kingdom) David Coulthard	All
(United Kingdom) CoBRa Motorsports	Reynard 92D	Ford Cosworth	19	(Italy) Paolo Delle Piane	All
(United Kingdom) CoBRa Motorsports	Reynard 92D	Ford Cosworth	20	(Italy) Guido Knycz	6-10
(Netherlands) Vortex Motorsport	Reynard 92D	Mugen Honda	21	(United Kingdom) Phil Andrews	1-8
(Netherlands) Vortex Motorsport	Reynard 92D	Ford Cosworth	21	(United Kingdom) Phil Andrews	9-10
(Netherlands) Vortex Motorsport	Reynard 92D	Mugen Honda	22	(Italy) Giuseppe Bugatti	All
(United Kingdom) GJ Motorsport	Lola T92/50	Mugen Honda	26	(Portugal) Pedro Chaves	1-6
(United Kingdom) GJ Motorsport	Lola T92/50	Mugen Honda	26	(United Kingdom) Richard Dean	7
(United Kingdom) GJ Motorsport	Lola T92/50	Mugen Honda	27	(France) Jérôme Policand	1-7
(Italy) Crypton Engineering	Reynard 92D	Ford Cosworth	28	(Germany) Michael Bartels	All
(Italy) Crypton Engineering	Reynard 92D	Ford Cosworth	29	(Italy) Luca Badoer	All
(France) Apomatox	Reynard 92D	Ford Cosworth	30	(France) Olivier Panis	All
(France) Apomatox	Reynard 92D	Ford Cosworth	31	(France) Emmanuel Collard	All
(Italy) Advance Racing	Reynard 92D	Ford Cosworth	32	(Italy) Vittorio Zoboli	1-3, 5-10
(Italy) Piemme Motors	Ralt RT24	Ford Cosworth	35	(Italy) Giambattista Busi	1, 4-10
(United Kingdom) Superpower	Reynard 92D	Ford Cosworth	36	(United Kingdom) Steve Robertson	1, 3-10
(Italy) SC Lazio Oil	Reynard 92D	Ford Cosworth	38	(Italy) Giovanni Bonanno	4-10

== Calendar ==
Round	Circuit	Date	Laps	Distance	Time	Speed	Pole position	Fastest lap	Winner
1	(United Kingdom) Silverstone Circuit	10 May	37	5.230=193.510 km	0'59:21.470	195.454 km/h	(Spain) Jordi Gené	(Brazil) Rubens Barrichello	(Spain) Jordi Gené
2	(France) Pau Grand Prix	8 June	72	2.78=200.16 km	1'25:38.91	139.210 km/h	(Italy) Andrea Montermini	(Italy) Emanuele Naspetti	(Italy) Emanuele Naspetti
3	(Spain) Circuit de Catalunya	21 June	43	4.747=204.121 km	1'06:51.154	183.198 km/h	(Italy) Andrea Montermini	(Italy) Emanuele Naspetti	(Italy) Andrea Montermini
4	(Italy) Autodromo di Pergusa	12 July	40	4.95=178.200 km	0'58:20.958	203.601 km/h	(Italy) Luca Badoer	(Italy) Luca Badoer	(Italy) Luca Badoer
5	(Germany) Hockenheimring	25 July	29	6.815=197.635 km	0'56:24.640	210.210 km/h	(Italy) Luca Badoer	(Italy) Luca Badoer	(Italy) Luca Badoer
6	(Germany) Nürburgring	23 August	45	4.542=204.39 km	1'06:10.45	185.320 km/h	(Italy) Emanuele Naspetti	(Brazil) Rubens Barrichello	(Italy) Luca Badoer
7	(Belgium) Circuit de Spa-Francorchamps	29 August	25	6.94=173.500 km	0'53:48.61	194.406 km/h	(Italy) Andrea Montermini	(Italy) Andrea Montermini	(Italy) Andrea Montermini
8	(Spain) Circuito de Albacete	13 September	58	3.598=208.684 km	1'20:36.22	155.341 km/h	(Italy) Luca Badoer	(Italy) Andrea Montermini	(Italy) Andrea Montermini
9	(France) Circuit Paul Armagnac	11 October	55	3.636=199.980 km	1'14:39.54	160.699 km/h	(Italy) Luca Badoer	(Italy) Luca Badoer	(Italy) Luca Badoer
10	(France) Circuit de Nevers Magny-Cours	18 October	47	4.25=199.750 km	1'08:13.148	175.684 km/h	(Italy) Luca Badoer	(United Kingdom) David Coulthard	(France) Jean-Marc Gounon

== Final points standings ==
=== Driver ===
For every race points were awarded: 9 points to the winner, 6 for runner-up, 4 for third place, 3 for fourth place, 2 for fifth place and 1 for sixth place. No additional points were awarded.

Pos	Driver	SIL (United Kingdom)	PAU (France)	CAT (Spain)	PER (Italy)	HOC (Germany)	NÜR (Germany)	SPA (Belgium)	ALB (Spain)	NOG (France)	MAG (France)	Points
1	(Italy) Luca Badoer	5	6	6	1	1	1	Ret	2	1	Ret	46
2	(Italy) Andrea Montermini	Ret	Ret	1	3	9	Ret	1	1	4	Ret	34
3	(Brazil) Rubens Barrichello	2	3	2	Ret	6	3	5	6	6	5	27
4	(Germany) Michael Bartels	Ret	2	Ret	4	2	2	3	Ret	Ret	DSQ	25
5	(Spain) Jordi Gené	1	Ret	3	Ret	5	8	2	Ret	8	10	21
6	(France) Jean-Marc Gounon	4	Ret	Ret	Ret	Ret	6	9	16†	2	1	19
7	(Italy) Emanuele Naspetti	6	1	16†	2	4	Ret					19
8	(France) Emmanuel Collard	Ret	Ret	4	Ret	12	4	DNQ	3	15	4	13
9	(United Kingdom) David Coulthard	7	Ret	8	Ret	Ret	7	4	7	3	3	11
10	(France) Olivier Panis	3	Ret	7	Ret	20	Ret	Ret	Ret	Ret	2	10
11	(United Kingdom) Allan McNish	Ret		5	Ret	3	Ret	12	5			8
12	(Italy) Alessandro Zampedri	Ret	Ret	11	5	7	Ret	7	8	5	Ret	4
13	(United Kingdom) Paul Stewart	8	11	9	8	16	10	11	4	Ret	Ret	3
14	(Italy) Vittorio Zoboli	Ret	4	12		14	12	15	13	12	Ret	3
15	(France) Laurent Aïello	Ret	Ret	15†	11	10	5	6	15†	7	Ret	3
16	(Italy) Giuseppe Bugatti	DNS	5	Ret	Ret	8	Ret	14	DNQ	Ret	Ret	2
17	(Italy) Giampiero Simoni						Ret	10	9	Ret	6	1
18	(France) Jérôme Policand	Ret	Ret	Ret	6	19†	Ret	13		13	Ret	1
19	(United Kingdom) Phil Andrews	12	7	10	9	11	DNQ	18	10	14	Ret	0
20	(Portugal) Pedro Chaves	Ret	9	Ret	7	13	13	DNQ	11	10	Ret	0
21	(United Kingdom) Steve Robertson	Ret		DNQ	Ret	18	Ret	DNS	Ret	11	7	0
22	(France) Frédéric Gosparini	Ret	8	Ret	Ret	Ret	11	16				0
23	(Japan) Hideki Noda	Ret	DNQ	Ret	Ret	DNS	14	17	12	Ret	8	0
24	(Italy) Giovanni Bonanno				Ret	15	Ret	8	DNQ	Ret	Ret	0
25	(Monaco) Olivier Beretta	9	Ret	Ret	Ret	Ret	9	Ret	17†	9	Ret	0
26	(Italy) Guido Knycz						DNQ	Ret	14	Ret	9	0
27	(Italy) Fabiano Vandone	10	Ret	14	10	17						0
28	(Italy) Paolo Delle Piane	11	10	13	Ret	Ret	15	Ret	Ret	Ret	Ret	0
29	(Australia) Mark Skaife									16	Ret	0
	(Italy) Giambattista Busi	Ret			Ret	Ret	Ret	Ret	Ret	DNS	Ret	
	(United Kingdom) Richard Dean							Ret				
	(France) Éric Hélary								Ret			

== Complete overview ==
first column of every race	10	= grid position

second column of every race	10	= race result

R16=retired, but classified R=retired NS=did not start NQ=did not qualify DIS(6)=disqualified after finishing in eleventh place (25)=place after practice, but grid position not held free

Place	Name	Team	Chassis	Engine	SIL (United Kingdom)		PAU (France)		CAT (Spain)		PER (Italy)		HOC (Germany)		NÜR (Germany)		SPA (Belgium)		ALB (Spain)		NOG (France)		MAG (France)
1	(Italy) Luca Badoer	Crypton Engineering	Reynard	Ford Cosworth	5	5	10	6	11	6	1	1	1	1	2	1	6	R	1	2	1	1	1	R
2	(Italy) Andrea Montermini	Il Barone Rampante	Reynard	Judd	12	R	1	R	1	1	2	3	8	9
2	(Italy) Andrea Montermini	Il Barone Rampante	Reynard	Ford Cosworth											8	R
2	(Italy) Andrea Montermini	Forti Corse	Reynard	Ford Cosworth													1	1	3	1	2	4	2	R
3	(Brazil) Rubens Barrichello	Il Barone Rampante	Reynard	Judd	9	2	4	3	2	2	10	R	10	6
3	(Brazil) Rubens Barrichello	Il Barone Rampante	Reynard	Ford Cosworth											5	3	9	5	2	6	5	6	5	5
4	(Germany) Michael Bartels	Crypton Engineering	Reynard	Ford Cosworth	8	R	3	2	7	R	6	4	4	2	3	2	2	3	13	R	6	R	10	DIS(11)
5	(Spain) Jordi Gené	Pacific Racing	Reynard	Mugen Honda	1	1	11	R	3	3	13	R	2	5	10	8	7	2	8	R	13	8	20	10
6	(Italy) Emanuele Naspetti	Forti Corse	Reynard	Ford Cosworth	20	6	2	1	4	R16	5	2	13	4	1	R	-	-	-	-	-	-	-	-
	(France) Jean-Marc Gounon	DAMS	Lola	Ford Cosworth	11	4	6	R	5	R	7	R	5	R	7	6	13	9	7	R16	3	2	6	1
8	(France) Emmanuel Collard	Apomatox	Lola	Ford Cosworth	22	R	18	R	13	4	22	R	20	12	4	4	28	NQ	6	3	22	15	3	4
9	(United Kingdom) David Coulthard	Paul Stewart Racing	Reynard	Judd	25	7	7	R	12	8	11	R	9	R	9	7	8	4	17	7	4	3	8	3
10	(France) Olivier Panis	Apomatox	Lola	Ford Cosworth	2	3	19	R	15	7	14	R	26	20	6	R	15	R	10	R	9	R	4	2
11	(United Kingdom) Allan McNish	3001 International	Reynard	Mugen Honda	21	R	-	-	8	5	3	R	7	3	11	R	5	12	12	5	-	-	-	-
12	(Italy) Alessandro Zampedri	Forti Corse	Reynard	Ford Cosworth	7	R	15	R	9	11	16	5	12	7	17	R	12	7	14	8	8	5	12	R
13	(Italy) Vittorio Zoboli	Advance Racing	Reynard	Ford Cosworth	18	R	9	4	22	12	-	-	17	14	15	12	23	15	18	13	11	12	13	R
	(France) Laurent Aïello	Pacific Racing	Reynard	Mugen Honda	4	R	8	R	6	R15	9	11	3	10	12	5	4	6	4	R15	7	7	9	R
	(United Kingdom) Paul Stewart	Paul Stewart Racing	Reynard	Judd	6	8	16	11	14	9	12	8	23	16	18	10	14	11	5	4	10	R	11	R
16	(Italy) Giuseppe Bugatti	Vortex	Reynard	Ford Cosworth	3	NS	5	5	18	R	23	R	6	8	19	R	18	14	26	NQ	18	R	18	R
17	(France) Jérôme Policand	GJ Motorsports	Lola	Mugen Honda	13	R	20	R	20	R	18	6	19	R19	22	R	17	13	-	-
17	(France) Jérôme Policand	DAMS	Lola	Ford Cosworth																	15	13	17	R
	(Italy) Giampiero Simoni	Il Barone Rampante	Reynard	Judd	-	-	-	-	-	-	-	-	-	-	23	R	11	10	15	9	19	R	15	6
-	(United Kingdom) Phil Andrews	Vortex	Reynard	Mugen Honda	24	12	14	7	19	10	25	9	11	11	27	NQ	16	18	19	10
-	(United Kingdom) Phil Andrews	Vortex	Reynard	Judd																	20	14	19	R
-	(Portugal) Pedro Chaves	GJ Motorsports	Lola	Mugen Honda	10	R	21	9	24	R	15	7	15	13	14	13
-	(Portugal) Pedro Chaves	Il Barone Rampante	Reynard	Ford Cosworth													27	NQ	16	11	14	10	22	R
-	(United Kingdom) Steve Robertson	Superpower	Reynard	Ford Cosworth	23	R	-	-	25	NQ	26	R	18	18	24	R	26	NS	20	R	16	11	21	7
-	(France) Frédéric Gosparini	DAMS	Lola	Ford Cosworth	16	R	17	8	10	R	19	R	21	R	13	11	22	16	-	-	-	-	-	-
-	(Japan) Hideki Noda	3001 International	Reynard	Mugen Honda	26	R	23	NQ	21	R	21	R	(25)	NS	26	14	24	17	23	12	21	R	23	8
-	(Italy) Giovanni Bonanno	SC Lazio Oil	Reynard	Ford Cosworth	-	-	-	-	-	-	4	R	16	15	21	R	10	8	25	NQ	25	R	16	R
-	(Monaco) Olivier Beretta	Piquet Racing	Reynard	Mugen Honda	14	9	12	R	17	R	8	R	14	R	20	9
-	(Monaco) Olivier Beretta	Piquet Racing	Reynard	Ford Cosworth													3	R	9	R17	12	9	7	R
-	(Italy) Guido Knycz	CoBra Motorsports	Reynard	Ford Cosworth	-	-	-	-	-	-	-	-	-	-	28	NQ	25	R	22	14	24	R	25	9
-	(Italy) Fabiano Vandone	Il Barone Rampante	Reynard	Judd	19	10	13	R	16	14	17	10	22	17	-	-	-	-	-	-	-	-	-	-
-	(Italy) Paolo Delle Piane	CoBRa Motorsports	Reynard	Ford Cosworth	17	11	22	10	23	13	20	R	24	R	16	15	20	R	21	R	17	R	14	R
-	(Australia) Mark Skaife	3001 International	Reynard	Mugen Honda	-	-	-	-	-	-	-	-	-	-	-	-	-	-	-	-	23	16	24	R
-	(Italy) Giambattista Busi	Piemme Motors	Ralt	Ford Cosworth	15	R	-	-	-	-	24	R	25	R	25	R	19	R	24	R	26	NS	26	R
-	(United Kingdom) Richard Dean	GJ Motorsports	Lola	Mugen Honda	-	-	-	-	-	-	-	-	-	-	-	-	21	R	-	-	-	-	-	-
-	(France) Éric Hélary	DAMS	Lola	Ford Cosworth	-	-	-	-	-	-	-	-	-	-	-	-	-	-	11	R	-	-	-	-
