= Piquet Racing =

British auto racing team

(Brazil) Piquet Racing
- Founded: 1992
- Founder(s): Nelson Piquet; Nigel Stepney
- Folded: 1992
- Team principal(s): Nelson Piquet
- Former series: Formula 3000

Piquet Racing was a short-lived British Formula 3000 racing team set up in 1992 by Brazilian Formula One world champion Nelson Piquet and Nigel Stepney.

The team entered a single car for Olivier Beretta, a young Monegasque friend of Piquet, in the 1992 Formula 3000 season. The season was without much success, though, as Beretta failed to score any points, and third on the grid at the Spa-Francorchamps round was the highlight of the season. The team did not return for 1993.

== Complete Formula 3000 results ==
(key) (Races in bold indicate pole position; races in italics indicate fastest lap)

Year	Chassis	Engine	Tyres	Driver	1	2	3	4	5	6	7	8	9	10	TC	Points
1992	Reynard 92D	Mugen Honda; Ford Cosworth	**A**		SIL	PAU	CAT	PER	HOC	NÜR	SPA	ALB	NOG	MAG	14th	0
1992	Reynard 92D	Mugen Honda; Ford Cosworth	**A**	(Monaco) Olivier Beretta	9	Ret	Ret	Ret	Ret	9	Ret	17^{†}	9	Ret	14th	0
