= 1987 Monaco Grand Prix Formula Three =

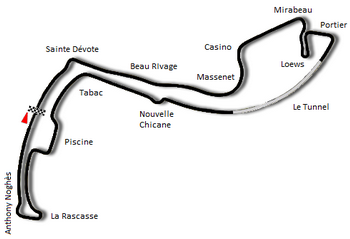
Circuit de Monaco (1986-1996)

Results from the 1987 Monaco Grand Prix Formula Three held at Monte Carlo on May 30, 1987, in the Circuit de Monaco.

== Classification ==
Pos	Driver	Constructor	Laps	Time/Retired
1	(France) Didier Artzet	Ralt RT31-Volkswagen	24	39.52,930
2	(France) Jean Alesi	Dallara F387-Alfa Romeo	24	39.33,455
3	(United Kingdom) Johnny Herbert	Reynard 873-Volkswagen	24	39.46,063
4	(Italy) Nicola Larini	Dallara F387-Alfa Romeo	24	39.50,520
5	(Italy) Alberto Apicella	Dallara F387-Alfa Romeo	24	39.54,501
6	(France) Fabien Giroix	Dallara F387-Alfa Romeo	24	39.58,730
7	(France) Jean-Noel Lanctuit	Ralt RT31-Volkswagen	24	39.59,244
8	(Germany) Bernd Schneider	Dallara F387-Volkswagen	24	39.59,618
9	(France) Éric Chéli	Ralt RT31-Toyota	24	40.22,433
10	(France) Érik Comas	Ralt RT31-Alfa Romeo	24	40.40,627
11	(Belgium) Éric Bachelart	Ralt RT31-Volkswagen	24	40.46,524
12	(France) Jacques Goudchaux	Dallara F387-Alfa Romeo	24	40.49,782
13	(France) Hervé Leclerc	Reynard 873-Volkswagen	24	40.54,482
14	(Netherlands) Peter Kox	Reynard 873-Volkswagen	24	40.57,053
DNF	(Argentina) Víctor Rosso	Ralt RT31-Volkswagen	18	30.34,122
DNF	(Switzerland) Philippe Favre	Reynard 873-Alfa Romeo	17	28.50,797
DNF	(France) Éric Bernard	Ralt RT31-Alfa Romeo	14	23.36,184
DNF	(Italy) Enrico Bertaggia	Dallara F387-Alfa Romeo	13	21.50,270
DNF	(Italy) Rinaldo Capello	Reynard 873-Alfa Romeo	11	19.14,495
DNF	(France) Philippe Gache	Reynard 873-Volkswagen	0	
DNF	(Italy) Eugenio Visco	Reynard 873-Volkswagen	0	
DNF	(Switzerland) Andrea Chiesa	Dallara F387-Alfa Romeo	0	
