= David Velay =

French former racing driver (born 1963)

- Nationality: French
- Born: 15 December 1963 (age 62) Saint-Étienne, France
- Years active: 1979–2002

SPORT AUTO OCTOBRE 1987

David Velay (born 15 December 1963 in Saint-Étienne) is a French former racing driver. Active from the 1980s to the early 2000s, he won the French Formula 3 Championship (Class B) title in 1986 and competed in Formula 3000, Supertourisme and endurance racing.

== Racing career ==
=== Karting debut (1979–1982) ===
Introduced to driving at a very young age by his father, David Velay began competing in kart racing with the Puma-Forez club. In 1979, he raced in the regional league's Classe Bleue category using a McCulloch engine, before moving up to the National level the following year. In 1981, he won the Challenge Aurore driving a Birel chassis.

He advanced to the Inter category in 1982 and joined the French national team (Équipe de France). That year, he finished 2nd in the League Championship and 8th in the French Karting Championship, competing alongside future prominent drivers such as Éric Bernard, Jean-Marc Gounon, and Pierre-Henri Raphanel.

=== Formula Renault and Formula 3 (1983–1988) ===
In late 1982, he entered the Volant Elf selections at the Winfield Racing School at Circuit Paul Ricard (Le Castellet), where he reached the semi-finals in an edition won by Paul Belmondo. In 1983, he made his single-seater debut in the French Formula Renault Championship driving a Martini MK24. He won the "Challengers" category races at Magny-Cours and Charade, and finished 8th overall at Albi. Becoming an official driver for Orion in 1984, he continued his progression despite the constraints of his national military service in 1985—a year in which he secured a 5th-place finish at Albi in a Martini MK44 leased from Serge Saulnier's team, earning the honorary title of top independent driver (8th overall in the standings).

In 1986, he entered the French Formula 3 Championship in Class B (F3B). Driving a Martini MK45-Alfa Romeo entered by the Saulnier team, he secured three class victories at La Châtre and Le Castellet (held as a support race for the French Grand Prix), finishing 11th in the overall classification. He clinched the French Formula 3B Championship title following a season-long duel against Hervé Leclerc.

He moved up to the main tier of Formula 3 in 1987, starting the season with Duqueine before joining the Alesi Junior Team, where he finished 2nd at Nogaro behind Jean Alesi. In 1988, recruited by the Elf Winfield team, he drove a Ralt RT32-Alfa Romeo and notably participated in the Monaco Formula 3 Grand Prix, finishing 10th. Due to a lack of budget mid-season, he cut his campaign short and became an instructor for the Winfield Racing School at Magny-Cours, a position he held until 1997.

=== Supertourisme, F3000 and Prototypes (1989–1995) ===
David Velay transitioned to the French Supertourisme Championship in 1989, driving a Ford Sierra RS Cosworth for Dominique Fornage's team alongside teammate René Metge, and entered the 24 Hours of Spa. Late that year, he entered a round of the International Formula 3000 Championship at Circuit de Dijon-Prenois with Bromley Motorsport, finishing 14th in a Reynard 89D. In 1990, he continued in Supertourisme driving a Volkswagen Golf alongside Jean-Louis Deglise.

In 1991, he entered the Alfa Romeo Sport Prototype Cup with Didier Bonnet's team, driving a Debora SP91 and finishing 5th in the championship. Concurrently, he made a one-off appearance in F3000 at Nogaro for Bernard Bouhier's Galaxy Racing, replacing Philippe Gache and finishing 10th in a Lola T89/50.

Appointed as an official Norma driver in 1992 to support Marcel Tarrès, he contended in the Alfa Cup for two seasons (finishing 5th in 1992 and 6th in 1993). Following brief appearances in sports prototypes driving an Osella in 1994, he took part in the 1995 24 Hours of Zolder in a Peugeot 309 and entered the pre-qualifying sessions of the 1995 24 Hours of Le Mans in a Dodge Viper.

=== Grand Touring and retirement (1996–2002) ===
In 1996, he joined the BPR endurance championship driving a Venturi 600 LM entered by Éric Graham. Concurrently, he competed in the Lamborghini Diablo SuperSport Trophy, finishing 5th overall with one race victory. The following year, in 1997, he raced in the French GT Championship, claiming two podiums, including a class victory at the wheel of a Venturi 400 Trophy. He took part in the pre-qualifying tests for the 24 Hours of Le Mans with a Panoz GTR entered by DAMS, and made cameo appearances in the FIA GT Championship driving a McLaren F1 GTR for Jean-Luc Maury-Laribière's BBA Competition team.

Until 2002, he balanced his corporate career with occasional GT entries, driving Porsche 911 GT2 and Venturi 300 Atlantique cars. Most notably, he became a regular frontrunner in the Lamborghini GTR SuperTrophy, sharing a Diablo GTR with Swiss driver Alexander Frei. The duo finished as runners-up in the series in 2002 and entered the 24 Hours of Spa twice (2001 and 2002). Velay retired from professional racing at the end of the 2002 season.

== Business career ==
Parallel to and following his racing career, Velay transitioned into automotive fleet management and the insurance sector:

- 1988–1997: Instructor at the Renault Elf Winfield Racing School (Magny-Cours)
- 1997–2004: Sales Engineer, later Regional Sales Director at LeasePlan
- 2004–2008: Commercial Director at Athlon Car Lease
- 2008–2010: Commercial Director at ELAT
- 2011–2018: General Insurance Agent at MMA
- 2019–present: Founder of Set Up Courtage (insurance brokerage firm)

== Honors and awards ==
- 1981: Winner of the Challenge Aurore (Karting)
- 1986: French Formula 3 Champion (Class B)
- 2002: Runner-up in the Lamborghini GTR SuperTrophy
