= Giuseppe Bugatti =

Italian former racing driver

- Nationality: Italian
- Born: 1 March 1965 (age 61) Brescia, Italy

1993 International Formula 3000 Championship
- Years active: 1984 - 1993
- Teams: Euroteam, Cevenini, Prema Racing, Il Barone Rampante, Vortex, European Technique

Giuseppe Bugatti (born 1 March 1965) is an Italian former racing driver.
