= Philippe Gache =

French racing driver (born 1962)

- Gache at the 1996 24 Hours of Le Mans
- Nationality: French
- Born: Philippe Marc Gache; 31 May 1962 (age 64) Avignon, France
- Categorisation: FIA Gold (until 2014); FIA Silver (2015–2022); FIA Bronze (2023–)
24 Hours of Le Mans career
- Years: 1987, 1989, 1994, 1996 - 2002
- Teams: WM Secateva; Viper Team Oreca; Riley & Scott Europe; SMG Compétition
- Best finish: 21st (1996)
- Class wins: 0

Philippe Marc Gache (born 31 May 1962, Avignon, France) is a French racing driver. He has raced in a number of disciplines, but for the last 20 years (as of 2006), has specialized in off-road racing. In 1992, he competed in the Indianapolis 500, but crashed his car. He has driven in the Dakar Rally in 2003–2006 and seven times in the 24 Hours of Le Mans. In 2006, he took his best finish on the Dakar, 12th place overall. In the 2010 edition of the Dakar Rally, he drove an SMG Buggy.

== Career highlights ==
- 1985 – French Formula Ford 1600 Champion
- 1993 – Third FIA Touring Car Challenge
- 1997 – Third FIA GT2 Championship
- 2000 – Second French Carrera Cup Championship
- 2001 – French Carrera Cup Champion

== Racing record ==
=== Career summary ===
Season	Series	Team	Races	Wins	Poles	F/Laps	Podiums	Points	Position
1984	Formula Ford 1600 France		?	1	?	?	?	0	NC
1985	Formula Ford 1600 France		11	3	?	?	?	?	**1st**
1986	French Formula Three Championship	DG Racing	9	0	0	0	0	33	7th
1986	Formula Ford 1600 - Ford Race of Champions		1	0	?	?	0	0	NC
1986	EFDA Bridgestone EuroCup Formula Ford 1600		?	?	?	?	?	12	11th
1987	French Formula Three Championship	DG Racing	13	1	2	0	3	73	5th
1987	Grand Prix de Monaco F3	DG Racing	1	0	0	0	0	N/A	DNF
1987	24 Hours of Le Mans – C1	WM Secateva	1	0	0	0	0	N/A	DNF
1988	French Formula Three Championship	Oreca	12	0	0	1	4	63	5th
1988	Grand Prix de Monaco F3	Oreca	1	0	0	0	0	N/A	DNF
1988	Macau Grand Prix	DG Racing	1	0	0	0	0	N/A	DNF
1989	International Formula 3000	Apomatox 3000	8	0	0	0	0	0	NC
1989	24 Hours of Le Mans – C1	WM Secateva	1	0	0	0	0	N/A	DNF
1990	International Formula 3000	Apomatox 3000	7	0	0	0	0	0	NC
1990	International Formula 3000	Galaxy Racing	2	0	0	1	0	0	NC
1991	International Formula 3000	Galaxy Racing	9	0	0	0	0	2	16th
1991	International Formula 3000	Crypton Engineering	1	0	0	0	0	2	16th
1991	Porsche Carrera Cup France	Sonauto	2	0	0	0	0	0	NC
1992	French Supertouring Championship		7	0	0	0	0	0	NC
1992	PPG Indy Car World Series	Dick Simon Racing	1	0	0	0	0	0	60th
1993	French Supertouring Championship	Graff Racing	10	0	0	2	3	101	6th
1993	FIA Touring Car Challenge	Fiat Auto France	2	0	0	0	1	33	**3rd**
1994	French Supertouring Championship	Graff Racing	12	0	0	0	1	95	7th
1994	FIA Touring Car World Cup	Graff Racing	1	0	0	0	0	0	NC
1994	24 Hours of Le Mans – GT1	Rent-a-Car Racing Team	1	0	0	0	0	N/A	NC
1995	French Supertouring Championship	Alfa Corse	7	0	0	1	3	30	9th
1995	International Touring Car Series	Alfa Corse 2	2	0	0	0	0	1	22nd
1995	BPR Global GT Series	Venturi	2	0	0	0	0	14	121st
1996	Renault Sport Spider Elf Trophy		?	0	0	0	1	24	15th
1996	BPR Global GT Series	Viper Team Oreca	4	0	0	0	0	27	55th
1996	24 Hours of Le Mans – GT1	Viper Team Oreca	1	0	0	0	0	N/A	12th
1997	FIA GT Championship	Viper Team Oreca	10	4	8	?	8	60	**3rd**
1997	24 Hours of Le Mans – GT2	Viper Team Oreca	1	0	0	0	0	N/A	DNF
1998	International Sports Racing Series	Solution F	4	0	0	0	1	35	10th
1998	24 Hours of Le Mans – LMP1	Solution F	1	0	0	0	0	N/A	DNF
1999	Sports Racing World Cup	Riley & Scott Europe	4	0	0	0	0	0	NC
1999	24 Hours of Le Mans – LMP	Riley & Scott Europe	1	0	0	0	0	N/A	DNF
1999	French GT Championship	BB Propulsion	3	1	1	?	2	36	50th
2000	American Le Mans Series	SMG Compétition	2	0	0	0	0	12	57th
2000	24 Hours of Le Mans – LMP900	SMG Compétition	1	0	0	0	0	N/A	DNF
2000	Porsche Carrera Cup France		?	0	?	?	?	?	7th
2001	Porsche Carrera Cup France		?	?	?	?	?	?	**1st**
2001	24 Hours of Le Mans – LMP900	SMG Compétition	1	0	0	0	0	N/A	DNF
2002	24 Hours of Le Mans – LMP900	DAMS	1	0	0	0	0	N/A	NC
2003	Dakar Rally – Cars		1	0	—N/a		0	N/A	43rd
2004	Dakar Rally – Cars	SMG	1	0	—N/a		0	N/A	DNF
2005	Dakar Rally – Cars	SMG	1	0	—N/a		0	N/A	28th
2006	Dakar Rally – Cars	SMG	1	0	—N/a		0	N/A	12th
2007	Dakar Rally – Cars	SMG	1	0	—N/a		0	N/A	31st
2010	Dakar Rally – Cars	SMG	1	0	—N/a		0	N/A	DNF
2011	Blancpain Endurance Series – GT3 Pro-Am Cup	SMG	1	0	0	0	0	12	17th
2011	International GT Open – GTS	SMG	2	0	0	0	0	0	NC
2011	French GT Championship	SMG	7	0	0	0	0	5	19th
2012	French GT Championship	SMG	1	0	0	0	0	0	NC
2012	Blancpain Endurance Series – GT3 Pro Cup	SMG	3	0	0	0	0	9	22nd
2015	Dakar Rally – Cars	SMG	1	0	—N/a		0	N/A	DNF
2018	World Rally Championship	Philippe Gache	1	0	—N/a		0	0	NC
2019	Dakar Rally – Cars	Geely	1	0	—N/a		0	N/A	DNF
2026	GT3 Revival Series	Saintéloc Racing							

=== 24 Hours of Le Mans results ===
Year	Team	Co-Drivers	Car	Class	Laps	Pos.	Class Pos.
1987	(France) WM Secateva	(France) Roger Dorchy (France) Dominique Delestre	WM P87-Peugeot	C1	13	DNF	DNF
1989	(France) WM Secateva	(France) Pascal Pessiot (France) Jean-Daniel Raulet	WM P489-Peugeot	C1	110	DNF	DNF
1994	(France) Rent-a-Car Racing Team	(France) François Migault (France) Denis Morin	Dodge Viper RT/10	GT1	225	NC	NC
1996	(France) Viper Team Oreca	(France) Éric Hélary (Monaco) Olivier Beretta	Chrysler Viper GTS-R	GT1	283	21st	12th
1997	(France) Viper Team Oreca	(Monaco) Olivier Beretta (France) Dominique Dupuy	Chrysler Viper GTS-R	GT2	263	DNF	DNF
1998	(France) Solution F	(Australia) Wayne Gardner (Belgium) Didier de Radiguès	Riley & Scott Mk III-Ford	LMP1	155	DNF	DNF
1999	(France) Riley & Scott Europe	(South Africa) Gary Formato (France) Olivier Thévenin	Riley & Scott Mk III/2-Ford	LMP	25	DNF	DNF
2000	(France) SMG Compétition	(South Africa) Gary Formato (France) Didier Cottaz	Courage C60-Judd	LMP900	219	DNF	DNF
2001	(France) SMG Compétition	(France) Jérôme Policand (France) Anthony Beltoise	Courage C60-Judd	LMP900	51	DNF	DNF
2002	(France) DAMS	(France) Emmanuel Clérico (Belgium) Michel Neugarten	Lola B98/10-Judd	LMP900	150	NC	NC

=== Complete International Formula 3000 results ===
(key) (Races in bold indicate pole position; races in italics indicate fastest lap.)

Year	Entrant	Chassis	Engine	1	2	3	4	5	6	7	8	9	10	11	Pos.	Pts
1989	Apomatox 3000	Reynard 89D	Cosworth	SIL	VAL	PAU; Ret	JER; 8	PER; DNQ	BRH; Ret	BIR; 8	SPA; Ret	BUG; 8	DIJ; Ret		NC	0
1990	Apomatox 3000	Reynard 90D	Cosworth	DON; 9	SIL; DNQ	PAU; Ret	JER; 14	MNZ; Ret	PER; Ret	HOC; Ret	BRH	BIR			NC	0
1990	Galaxy Racing	Lola T89/50	Cosworth										BUG; Ret	NOG; Ret	NC	0
1991	Galaxy Racing	Lola T91/50	Cosworth	VAL; DNQ	PAU; 12	JER; 10	MUG; Ret	PER; 9	HOC; Ret						16th	2
1991	Galaxy Racing	Lola T89/50	Cosworth							BRH; 11	SPA; 9	BUG; 5			16th	2
1991	Crypton Engineering	Reynard 91D	Cosworth										NOG; Ret		16th	2

=== American open-wheel racing ===
(key)

==== PPG Indy Car World Series ====
Year	Team	Chassis	Engine	1	2	3	4	5	6	7	8	9	10	11	12	13	14	15	16	Pos.	Pts	Ref
1992	Dick Simon Racing	Lola T91/00	Chevrolet 265A V8t	SRF	PHX	LBH	INDY; 28	DET	POR	MIL	NHA	TOR	MCH	CLE	ROA	VAN	MDO	NAZ	LAG	60th	0	

===== Indianapolis 500 =====
Year	Chassis	Engine	Start	Finish	Team
1992	Lola	Chevrolet	16	28	Dick Simon Racing

=== Complete International Touring Car Championship results ===
(key)

Year	Team	Car	1	2	3	4	5	6	7	8	9	10	Pos.	Pts
1995	Alfa Corse 2	Alfa Romeo 155 V6 Ti	MUG; 1	MUG; 2	HEL; 1	HEL; 2	DON; 1	DON; 2	EST; 1	EST; 2	MAG; 1; 13	MAG; 2; 10	22nd	1

=== Complete FIA GT Championship results ===
(key) (Races in bold indicate pole position) (Races in italics indicate fastest lap)

Year	Team	Car	Class	1	2	3	4	5	6	7	8	9	10	11	Pos.	Pts
1997	Viper Team Oreca	Chrysler Viper GTS-R	GT2	HOC; 1	**SIL**; 3	HEL	**NÜR**; 17	**SPA**; 2	**A1R**; 2	**SUZ**; 1	**DON**; 1	**MUG**; Ret	**SEB**; 1	LAG; 3	3rd	60

=== Dakar Rally results ===
Year	Class	Vehicle	Position	Stages won
2003	Cars	(Germany) Mercedes	43rd	0
2004	Cars	(France) SMG	DNF	0
2005	Cars	(France) SMG	28th	0
2006	Cars	(France) SMG	12th	0
2007	Cars	(France) SMG	31st	0
2008	Event cancelled – replaced by the 2008 Central Europe Rally			
2009	Did not enter			
2010	Cars	(France) SMG	DNF	0
2011	Did not enter			
2012	Did not enter			
2013	Did not enter			
2014	Did not enter			
2015	Cars	(France) SMG	DNF	0
2016	Did not enter			
2017	Did not enter			
2018	Did not enter			
2019	Cars	(China) Geely	DNF	0

=== WRC results ===
Year	Entrant	Car	1	2	3	4	5	6	7	8	9	10	11	12	13	WDC	Pts
2018	Philippe Gache	Abarth 124 Rally RGT	MON	SWE	MEX	FRA; 30	ARG	POR	ITA	FIN	GER	TUR	GBR	ESP	AUS	NC	0

Sporting positions
Preceded by Christophe Bouchut	Porsche Carrera Cup France Champion; 2001	Succeeded by Sébastian Dumez
