= Mark Albon =

British racing driver (born 1969)

- Nationality: British
- Born: 9 November 1969 (age 56)
- Retired: 1993
- Relatives: Nigel Albon (brother); Alex Albon (nephew)

International Formula 3000
- Years active: 1993
- Starts: 1

Mark James Albon (born 9 November 1969 in Billericay, Essex) is a British retired racing driver. He contested one round of the 1993 International Formula 3000 season for East Essex Racing at Donington Park, qualifying 21st on the grid and retiring from the race.

Before his F3000 race, Albon competed in the Formula Vauxhall Lotus Championship in 1991 and the British Formula Two Championship in 1992.

Since he retired from racing, Albon became the director of manufacturing and engineering at Albon Engineering, which provides automotive components to equipment manufacturers worldwide. He is the younger brother of Nigel Albon and uncle to Nigel's son Alex.

== Racing record ==
=== Complete International Formula 3000 results ===
(key) (Races in bold indicate pole position) (Races in italics indicate fastest lap)

Year	Entrant	Chassis	Engine	Tyres	1	2	3	4	5	6	7	8	9	DC	Points
1993	East Essex Racing	Reynard 92D	Ford Cosworth	A	DON; Ret	SIL	PAU	PER	HOC	NÜR	SPA	MAG	NOG	NC	0
