= Paul Stewart (racing driver) =

British racing driver

- Born: 29 October 1965 (age 61) Dumbarton, Scotland
- Relatives: Jackie Stewart (father)

Previous series
- 1991–93 1989–90 1988: International Formula 3000; British Formula 3 Championship; Formula Ford 2000

Paul Evan Stewart (born 29 October 1965) is a Scottish former racing driver and team owner.

The eldest son of three-time Formula One World Drivers' Champion Jackie Stewart, he and Jackie were the co-founders of Ford works team Stewart Grand Prix in 1996, which competed in Formula One from 1997 until 1999 when Ford purchased the team, rebranding to Jaguar Racing the following season. Prior to his managerial career, Stewart spent five years in junior formulae with eponymous racing team Paul Stewart Racing, a team that he and Jackie also launched together in support of Paul's junior career. Stewart competed in Formula Fords from 1987 to 1988, the British Formula 3 Championship from 1989 to 1990, and in Formula 3000 from 1991 to 1993.

== Early life ==
Paul Stewart was born in Scotland but moved to Switzerland before he was three and lived near many other racing drivers, including Jochen Rindt and Jo Bonnier. He learned to drive sitting on his father's knee, steering cars up and down the drive. Stewart was educated at Aiglon College and Duke University in North Carolina, where he read political science. His father had agreed to consider helping his motorsport career if he graduated. He worked in financial institutions in New York and Switzerland during the holidays until the summer when he would graduate. He signed up for a racing course at Brands Hatch under the name of Robin Congdon, paying for it himself, to ensure an honest assessment.

== Career ==
After completing his coursework, Stewart revealed his interest to go racing to his father Jackie, and despite Jackie initially being opposed to the idea, he did not want other people involved in his son's career and decided to support him. The two began working together and formed Paul Stewart Racing.

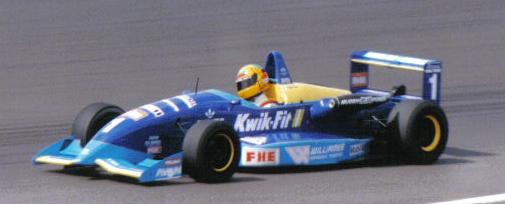
Ralph Firman driving for Paul Stewart Racing at Silverstone during the 1995 British Formula 3 Championship season.

Stewart entered Junior Formula Ford 1600 racing in the summer of 1987, where he led some races and scored a few podiums. The 'Paul Stewart Racing' brand became a fully-fledged team in 1988, fielding a Formula Ford 2000 sporting Camel sponsorship, with the assistance of Jackie's former mechanic Roy Topp, former Brabham chief mechanic Graham Lewins and James Skilling. Stewart won the next race at Cadwell Park and got the budget for Formula 3 racing. In Formula 3, Stewart came up against future F1 and Indycar drivers: Mika Häkkinen, David Coulthard, Gil de Ferran and Kenny Bräck. Paul won at Snetterton in strange circumstances. "I was leading, came up against a backmarker who looked like he was going to move one way as we were going into Russell, back when it was a proper, flat-out corner. In fact he went the other way. I spun and crossed the line backwards but the race was then red-flagged because Mika Hakkinen had just had a huge accident at the Bombhole and I won it on countback". That win earned him a place on the grid at the year end Macau Grand Prix where he qualified third and earned the title of best newcomer. Stewart did three seasons of F3000 with Marco Apicella, Coulthard and de Ferran as his team-mates. His best finish was third at the Pau Grand Prix in 1993. Despite testing for Footwork, he stopped racing and focused on his team.

== Personal life ==
Stewart is the oldest of two sons born to three-time Formula One World Drivers' Champion Jackie Stewart. His younger brother Mark is a film producer. Stewart married his wife Victoria in 1993 and has four sons.

In September 1999, Stewart was diagnosed with ulcerative colitis. A second colonoscopy in January 2000, did not detect cancerous cells. Further problems arose after Stewart was diagnosed with bowel cancer in April 2000. Upon hearing the news, he stepped down as Chief Operating Officer for Jaguar Racing and subsequently travelled to the Mayo Clinic in the U.S. for treatment. A CAT scan showed no signs of cancer returning.

[2007, BBC Radio interview, with Penny Junor, Stewart speaks only of his 1999 Mayo Clinic diagnosis with NHL (non Hodgkins lymphoma) -very heterogenous, he doesn't mention the subtype, nor whether it was curable or merely treatable, cf CLL/Clive James- linked radio segment starts at 19:27 into interview]

https://www.bbc.co.uk/sounds/play/b00837gj?partner=uk.co.bbc&origin=share-mobile

== Career summary ==
Year	Series	Team	Position
1989	Macau Grand Prix	Camel Paul Stewart Racing	NC
1989	British Formula Three	Camel Paul Stewart Racing	10th
1990	British Formula Three	Camel Paul Stewart Racing	7th
1991	Macau Grand Prix	Paul Stewart Racing	10th
1991	Formula 3000	Paul Stewart Racing	NC
1992	Formula 3000	Paul Stewart Racing	13th
1993	Formula 3000	Paul Stewart Racing	9th

== See also ==
- List of people diagnosed with ulcerative colitis
