= Cevenini =

Cevenini is an Italian surname. Notable people with the surname include:

- Aldo Cevenini (1889–1973), Italian footballer and manager
- Luigi Cevenini (1895–1968), Italian footballer and manager, brother of Aldo
