= Éric Chéli =

French racing driver

Éric Chéli (born 20 August 1966) is a French former racing driver.

== See also ==
- 1987 Monaco Grand Prix Formula Three
- 1989 International Formula 3000 Championship
- 1991 Monaco Grand Prix Formula Three
