= Crypton Engineering =

Crypton Engineering was an Italian auto racing team which competed in International Formula 3000 from 1990 to 1993. The team won its only drivers' title in 1992, thanks to Luca Badoer after winning four of that season's eleven races, with Michael Bartels finishing in fourth in the drivers' standings. Pedro Lamy came within a point of Olivier Panis in the 1993 title race, but Crypton wouldn't return for any subsequent seasons.
