= Dave Coyne =

British racing driver

David Coyne (born 31 March 1958) is a British racing driver.

Coyne was a rising star in Formula Ford, finishing fifth in the Formula Ford Festival in 1980 at age 22. In 1981 he moved up to the British Formula Three Championship and finished 20th while competing in only three races. He returned to the series in 1982 for six races and made a single start in 1984 and 1985. He moved to German F3 in 1986 for a single race and full-time in 1987 finishing ninth in the championship. In 1987 he won the revived European Formula Three Championship which consisted of four races. He also returned to the Formula Ford Festival for the first time since 1984. Coyne bounced around various F3 series until 1990 when he finished 4th in the British Formula Renault Championship and won the Formula Ford Festival at the age of 32 (the race is usually won by much younger drivers). The win re-sparked his career a bit as he competed full-time in British Formula 3000 in 1991, finishing fifth. His professional career ended in 1993 after he finished ninth in British Formula Renault. He had been set to drive in the last five races of the 1993 Formula One season for Pacific but the team's decision to defer entry until 1994 ended the deal.

Coyne returned to racing in 2005 racing a MTec built Superstox on the short oval tracks. His first win in the class came at the 2005 Spedeweekend.

Sporting positions
Preceded by Niko Palhares	Formula Ford Festival Winner; 1990	Succeeded by Marc Goossens
