= Severino Nardozzi =

Italian racing driver (born 1946)

Severino Nardozzi (born 4 June 1946) is an Italian racing driver.
