= Éric Angelvy =

French racing driver

Éric Angelvy (Saint-Ouen, 8 November 1968) is a French former racing driver.

Angelvy began his motor racing career in 1989 in the French Formula Ford 1600 championship. He scored 26 points and finished 13th in the championship standings. The following year, he finished as the championship runner-up. He subsequently competed in the Formula Ford Festival, French Formula 3, and Formula 3000.

On retirement from racing, Angelvy went into restaurant management and has run several Parisian restaurants, including Makoto, 912, Mustang Café, and House of Live ex-Chesterfield Café.
