= Giovanni Bonanno =

Italian racing driver

Giovanni Bonanno (born 9 September 1968, Rome) is an Italian former racing driver. He raced in Italian F3. Reflecting on his career, Bonanno has recalls where he did well in F3 but also what might have been. "I made various podiums in F3 and I was third in the European Championship. That year Michael Schumacher was racing and if I'm not mistaken so was Mika Hakkinen and Heinz-Harald Fretnzen. I perhaps could have done better but it was a year when I was amongst the fastest but unfortunately my impetuousness hasn't helped me much in my career."

After he stopped racing, he "didn't really watch F1 by choice. I felt bad as I was sad not to be there." Post-retirement, Bonanno has worked in Rome, in the watch making and jewellery business.
