= Il Barone Rampante =

Formula 3000 team

Il Barone Rampante (The Prancing Baron) is a racing team created by Giuseppe Cipriani in Venice. The team took its name from the original Italian title of Italo Calvino's 1957 book The Baron in the Trees.

Il Barone Rampante ran in Formula 3000 from 1991 to 1993, featuring drivers like Alessandro Zanardi, Rubens Barrichello and Andrea Montermini, Max Angelelli and Pedro Chaves.

The team never won a title although it came close on two occasions, when Zanardi finished second in 1991 and Montermini and Barrichello second and third respectively in 1992.

In 1992 Cipriani entered negotiations with Alessandro Benetton about Il Barone Rampante racing in Formula One as a B-team for Benetton but the plan did not come to fruition. Following an uncompetitive 1993 season with veteran Jan Lammers and Éric Angelvy at the wheel, Cipriani withdrew from Formula 3000.

Cipriani revived the name in 2017 to race in the 2017 World Series Formula V8 3.5 season, driving alongside fellow countryman Damiano Fioravanti. The team finished seventh and last in the teams' standings, being the only team to not have won any race during the season.

In 2021 Il Barone Rampante partnered with Lamborghini to compete in the International GT Open championship.
