= 1991 Masters of Formula 3 =

Race details
Date	18 August 1991
Official name	Marlboro Masters of Formula 3
Location	Circuit Park Zandvoort, Netherlands
Course	2.519 km (1.565 mi)
Distance	35 laps, 88.165 km (54.783 mi)

Pole
Driver	(Brazil) Rubens Barrichello	West Surrey Racing
Time	1:02.065

Fastest Lap
Driver	(Brazil) Rubens Barrichello	West Surrey Racing
Time	1:02.963 (on lap 9 of 35)

Podium
First	(United Kingdom) David Coulthard	Paul Stewart Racing
Second	(Spain) Jordi Gené	West Surrey Racing
Third	(Netherlands) Marcel Albers	Alan Docking Racing

The 1991 Marlboro Masters of Formula 3 was the first Masters of Formula 3 race held at Circuit Park Zandvoort on 18 August 1991. It was won by David Coulthard, for Paul Stewart Racing.

== Drivers and teams ==
1991 Entry List
Team	No	Driver	Chassis	Engine	Main series
(United Kingdom) Alan Docking Racing	1	(Netherlands) Marcel Albers	Ralt RT35	Mugen-Honda	British Formula 3
(United Kingdom) Alan Docking Racing	2	(Japan) Hideki Noda	Ralt RT35	Mugen-Honda	British Formula 3
(United Kingdom) West Surrey Racing	3	(Spain) Jordi Gené	Ralt RT35	Mugen-Honda	British Formula 3
(United Kingdom) West Surrey Racing	4	(Brazil) Rubens Barrichello	Ralt RT35	Mugen-Honda	British Formula 3
(Netherlands) Nomag Racing	5	(Netherlands) Frank ten Wolde	Ralt RT33	Volkswagen	German Formula Three
(Sweden) Picko Troberg Racing	6	(Sweden) Claes Rothstein	Ralt RT33	Volkswagen	Swedish Formula Three
(Sweden) Picko Troberg Racing	7	(Sweden) Linus Lundberg	Ralt RT35	Volkswagen	Swedish Formula Three
(Sweden) Pole 88 AB	8	(Sweden) Thomas Johansson	Reynard 913	Mugen-Honda	Swedish Formula Three
(Sweden) Pole 88 AB	9	(Sweden) Michael Gustavsson	Reynard 913	Mugen-Honda	Swedish Formula Three
(Sweden) Pole 88 AB	10	(Sweden) Niclas Jönsson	Reynard 913	Mugen-Honda	Swedish Formula Three
(France) Graff Racing	12	(France) Christophe Bouchut	Ralt RT33	Volkswagen	French Formula Three
(France) KTR Racing	14	(France) Ludovic Faure	Ralt RT35	Volkswagen	French Formula Three
(Italy) Coloni Racing	15	(Italy) Paolo Coloni	Ralt RT35	Alfa Romeo	Italian Formula Three
(United Kingdom) Paul Stewart Racing	18	(United Kingdom) David Coulthard	Ralt RT35	Mugen-Honda	British Formula 3
(United Kingdom) Paul Stewart Racing	19	(Brazil) André Ribeiro	Ralt RT35	Mugen-Honda	British Formula 3
(Italy) Supercars	22	(Italy) Luca Badoer	Dallara F391	Alfa Romeo	Italian Formula Three

== Classification ==
=== Qualifying ===
Pos	No	Name	Team	Time	Gap
1	4	(Brazil) Rubens Barrichello	West Surrey Racing	1:02.065	
2	3	(Spain) Jordi Gené	West Surrey Racing	1:02.302	+0.237
3	12	(France) Christophe Bouchut	Graff Racing	1:02.559	+0.494
4	1	(Netherlands) Marcel Albers	Alan Docking Racing	1:02.575	+0.510
5	18	(United Kingdom) David Coulthard	Paul Stewart Racing	1:02.744	+0.679
6	19	(Brazil) André Ribeiro	Paul Stewart Racing	1:02.750	+0.685
7	10	(Sweden) Niclas Jönsson	Pole 88 AB	1:03.027	+0.962
8	2	(Japan) Hideki Noda	Alan Docking Racing	1:03.030	+0.965
9	14	(France) Ludovic Faure	KTR Racing	1:03.031	+0.966
10	22	(Italy) Luca Badoer	Supercars	1:03.100	+1.035
11	15	(Italy) Paolo Coloni	Coloni Racing	1:03.470	+1.405
12	7	(Sweden) Linus Lundberg	Picko Troberg Racing	1:03.504	+1.439
13	9	(Sweden) Michael Gustavsson	Pole 88 AB	1:03.811	+1.746
14	6	(Sweden) Claes Rothstein	Picko Troberg Racing	1:04.252	+2.187
15	8	(Sweden) Thomas Johansson	Pole 88 AB	1:04.321	+2.256
16	5	(Netherlands) Frank ten Wolde	Nomag Racing	1:04.802	+2.737

=== Race ===
Pos	No	Driver	Team	Laps	Time/Retired	Grid
1	18	(United Kingdom) David Coulthard	Paul Stewart Racing	35	37:15.157	5
2	3	(Spain) Jordi Gené	West Surrey Racing	35	+0.341	2
3	1	(Netherlands) Marcel Albers	Alan Docking Racing	35	+4.370	4
4	22	(Italy) Luca Badoer	Supercars	35	+25.312	10
5	14	(France) Ludovic Faure	KTR Racing	35	+26.885	9
6	4	(Brazil) Rubens Barrichello	West Surrey Racing	35	+39.264	1
7	19	(Brazil) André Ribeiro	Paul Stewart Racing	35	+40.274	6
8	7	(Sweden) Linus Lundberg	Picko Troberg Racing	35	+47.226	12
9	15	(Italy) Paolo Coloni	Coloni Racing	35	+1:24.708	11
10	2	(Japan) Hideki Noda	Alan Docking Racing	34	+1 Lap	8
11	6	(Sweden) Claes Rothstein	Picko Troberg Racing	34	+1 Lap	14
12	5	(Netherlands) Frank ten Wolde	Nomag Racing	34	+1 Lap	16
13	9	(Sweden) Michael Gustavsson	Pole 88 AB	33	+2 Laps	13
14	10	(Sweden) Niclas Jönsson	Pole 88 AB	33	+2 Laps	7
Ret	8	(Sweden) Thomas Johansson	Pole 88 AB	7	Retired	15
Ret	12	(France) Christophe Bouchut	Graff Racing	2	Retired	3
Fastest lap and lap record: Rubens Barrichello, 1:02.963, 144.027 km/h (89.494 mph) on lap 9
