= 1991 British Formula Three Championship =

Motor racing championship

1991 British Formula 3 International Series

Seasons
- ← 1990 1992 →

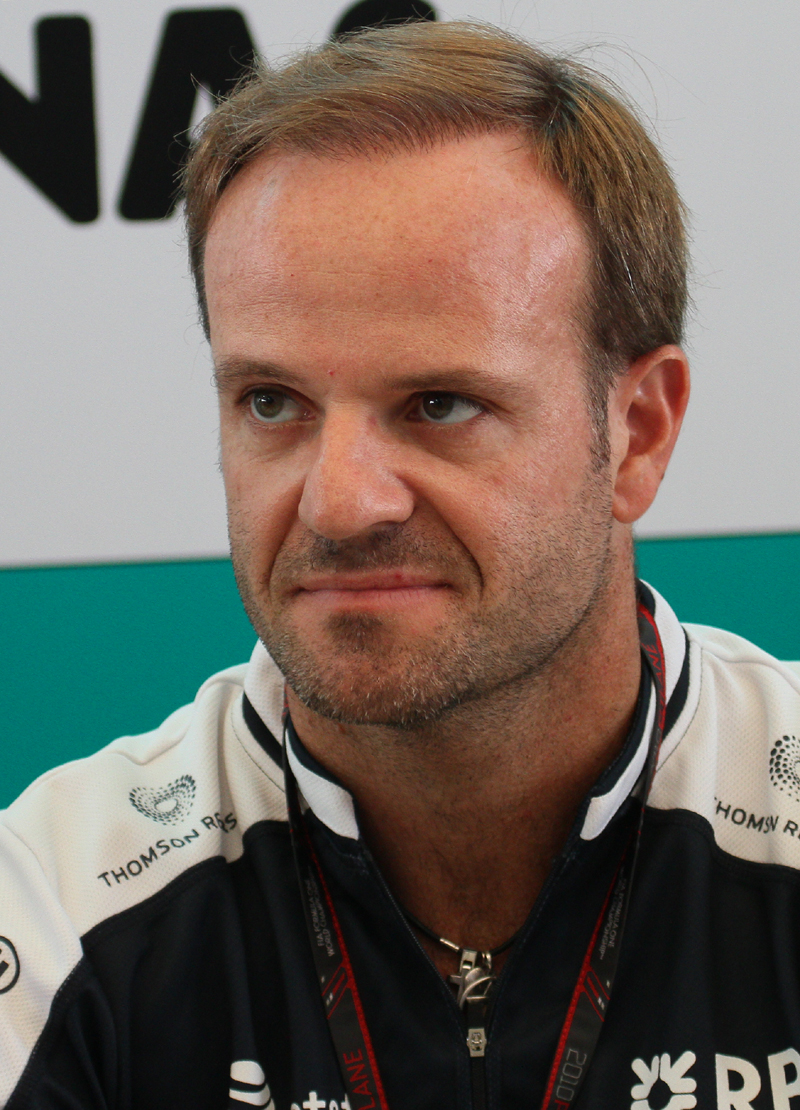
1991 champion, Rubens Barrichello

The 1991 British Formula Three season was the 41st British Formula Three Championship, won by Brazilian Rubens Barrichello. The season started on 17 March at Silverstone and ended on 13 October at Thruxton following sixteen races. The 1991 season is often considered a 'vintage' year for the series, producing two future Formula One Grand Prix winners in the form of Barrichello and David Coulthard as well as a future champions in CART (de Ferran), BTCC (Rydell) and WEC (Kristensen). It was also the last title win for Ralt chassis and the West Surrey Racing team. Class B was won by Finnish driver Pekka Herva.

The scoring system was 9-6-4-3-2-1 points awarded to the first six finishers, with 1 (one) extra point added to the driver who set the fastest lap of the race. The best 13 results counted for the driver's final tally.

== Drivers and Teams ==
The following teams and drivers were competitors in the 1991 season. Class B is for older Formula Three cars.

Team	Chassis	Engine	No.	Driver	Rounds
Class A
West Surrey Racing	Ralt RT35	Mugen-Honda	1	(Spain) Jordi Gené	All
West Surrey Racing	Ralt RT35	Mugen-Honda	2	(Brazil) Pedro Diniz	1-14
West Surrey Racing	Ralt RT35	Mugen-Honda	9	(Brazil) Rubens Barrichello	All
Steve Robertson Racing	Bowman BC1	Volkswagen-Spiess	3	(United Kingdom) Steve Robertson	14-16
Bowman Racing	Bowman BC1	Volkswagen-Spiess	3	(United Kingdom) Steve Robertson	1-13
Bowman Racing	Bowman BC1	Volkswagen-Spiess	4	(Brazil) Oswaldo Negri	All
Bowman Racing	Bowman BC1	Volkswagen-Spiess	10	(Monaco) Olivier Beretta	9-12, 14-16
Paul Stewart Racing	Ralt RT35	Mugen-Honda	5	(United Kingdom) David Coulthard	All
Paul Stewart Racing	Ralt RT35	Mugen-Honda	6	(Brazil) Eduar Merhy Neto	2-6
Paul Stewart Racing	Ralt RT35	Mugen-Honda	6	(Brazil) André Ribeiro	11-16
Alan Docking Racing	Ralt RT35	Mugen-Honda	7	(Netherlands) Marcel Albers	All
Alan Docking Racing	Ralt RT35	Mugen-Honda	8	(Japan) Hideki Noda	All
Edenbridge Racing	Ralt RT34	Mugen-Honda	11	(Belgium) Mikke Van Hool	1-2
Edenbridge Racing	Reynard 913	Mugen-Honda	11	(Belgium) Mikke Van Hool	3-16
Edenbridge Racing	Reynard 913	Mugen-Honda	12	(Brazil) Gil de Ferran	3-16
Racefax Motorsport	Reynard 913	Mugen-Honda	14	(Republic of Ireland) Bernard Dolan	1-5, 7-8, 10-12
Volkswagen Motorsport	Ralt RT35	Volkswagen-Spiess	15	(Germany) Klaus Panchyrz	10
Volkswagen Motorsport	Ralt RT35	Volkswagen-Spiess	16	(Denmark) Tom Kristensen	10
ZW Motorsports	Reynard 913	Mugen-Honda	17	(Republic of Ireland) Derek Higgins	4-5
TOM'S GB	TOM'S 031F	TOM'S-Toyota	18	(United Kingdom) Kelvin Burt	15
TOM'S GB	TOM'S 031F	TOM'S-Toyota	19	(Sweden) Rickard Rydell	All
APEX	Ralt RT35	Alfa Romeo-Novamotor	20	(Soviet Union) Urmas Pold	5-8
APEX	Ralt RT35	Alfa Romeo-Novamotor	22	(Soviet Union) Viktor Kosankov	5-8
Reynard R&D	Reynard 913	Mugen-Honda	21	(Brazil) Gil de Ferran	1-2
Bongers Motorsport	Reynard 913	Volkswagen-Spiess	23	(Germany) Jörg Müller	10
GB Motorsport	Reynard 913	Volkswagen-Spiess	25	(United States) Elton Julian	12-13
GB Motorsport	Reynard 913	Volkswagen-Spiess	25	(Canada) Bobby Carville	15
Class B
Cram Motorsport	Ralt RT34	Mugen-Honda	26	(United Kingdom) Rob Mears	All
Cram Motorsport	Ralt RT34	Mugen-Honda	27	(United Kingdom) Alan Carruthers	1-10
Paul Tickner	Ralt RT30	Volkswagen	29	(United Kingdom) Paul Tickner	5
Tollbar Racing	Ralt RT32	Volkswagen-Spiess	30	(United Kingdom) "Martin"	3
Tollbar Racing	Ralt RT32	Volkswagen-Spiess	31	(Italy) Guido Basile	10
ZW Motorsports	Ralt RT34	Mugen-Honda	32	(United States) Sandy Brody	1-6
Longridge Racing	Reynard 903	TOM'S-Toyota	32	(United Kingdom) Dominic Chappell	16
Longridge Racing	Reynard 903	TOM'S-Toyota	53	(United Kingdom) Dominic Chappell	15
John Lee Motorsport	Ralt RT32	TOM'S-Toyota	33	(United States) John Lee	All
Peter Lea Racing	Reynard 883	Alfa Romeo-Novamotor	34	(Republic of Ireland) Alan Tulloch	1-10
Peter Lea Racing	Reynard 883	Alfa Romeo-Novamotor	35	(United Kingdom) Eddie Kimbell	10
Tech-Speed Motorsport	Reynard 903	Volkswagen-Spiess	45	(Spain) Juan Serda	8-10
Tech-Speed Motorsport	Reynard 903	Volkswagen-Spiess	54	(Spain) Juan Serda	16
Tech-Speed Motorsport	Reynard 903	Volkswagen-Spiess	36	(United Kingdom) Steven Arnold	5-11
Tech-Speed Motorsport	Ralt RT34	Mugen-Honda	36	(United Kingdom) Steven Arnold	12-16
John Wilcock	Reynard 893	TOM'S-Toyota	37	(United Kingdom) John Wilcock	1-10, 12-16
Formel Rennsport	Reynard 903	Volkswagen-Spiess	38	(Switzerland) René Wartmann	10
Barrie Pusey	Reynard 873	Volkswagen-Judd	40	(United Kingdom) Barrie Pusey	3, 10
EIS Racing	Dallara F387	Volkswagen-Spiess	41	(United Kingdom) Ian Jacobs	8-10
Fred Goddard Racing	Reynard 893	Volkswagen-Spiess	42	(Finland) Pekka Herva	3-16
Fred Goddard Racing	Ralt RT34	Volkswagen-Spiess	44	(Egypt) Sherif El Sakkaf	2, 12-15
Prowess Racing	Ralt RT34	Mugen-Honda	43	(United Kingdom) Hugo Spowers	8-12
Prowess Racing	Ralt RT34	Mugen-Honda	43	(Hong Kong) Oliver Tan	16
Prowess Racing	Ralt RT34	Mugen-Honda	51	(Hong Kong) Oliver Tan	15
Brian Phillips	Reynard 883	Volkswagen	46	(United Kingdom) Brian Phillips	12-13
Alan Docking Racing	Ralt RT34	Mugen-Honda	47	(United States) Sandy Brody	8-16
Team West-Tec	Reynard 893	Volkswagen-Spiess	48	(United Kingdom) Thornton Mustard	15
Team West-Tec	Reynard 893	Volkswagen-Spiess	55	(United Kingdom) Thornton Mustard	14
Team West-Tec	Reynard 893	Volkswagen-Spiess	82	(United Kingdom) Thornton Mustard	11, 16
Steve Bottoms	Reynard 863	Volkswagen	49	(United Kingdom) Steve Bottoms	8
Mark Bailey Racing	Ralt RT34	Mugen-Honda	50	(United Kingdom) Nigel Smith	8-13, 15-16
Tony Trevor	Ralt RT32	Volkswagen	52	(United Kingdom) Tony Trevor	11
Peter Morgan	Reynard 903	Volkswagen	55	(United Kingdom) Peter Morgan	12-13

== Race calendar and results ==
All races were held in United Kingdom.

Round	Circuit	Date	Pole position	Fastest lap	Winning driver	Winning team	Class B winner
1	Silverstone	17 March	(Brazil) Rubens Barrichello	(Sweden) Rickard Rydell	(Sweden) Rickard Rydell	TOM'S	(United States) Sandy Brody
2	Thruxton	1 April	(Brazil) Rubens Barrichello	(Brazil) Rubens Barrichello	(Brazil) Rubens Barrichello	West Surrey Racing	(United Kingdom) Rob Mears
3	Donington Park	21 April	(Sweden) Rickard Rydell	(United Kingdom) Steve Robertson	(United Kingdom) David Coulthard	Paul Stewart Racing	(Finland) Pekka Herva
4	Brands Hatch	28 April	(Sweden) Rickard Rydell	(Brazil) Gil de Ferran	(United Kingdom) David Coulthard	Paul Stewart Racing	(Finland) Pekka Herva
5	Brands Hatch	19 May	(Brazil) Gil de Ferran	(Brazil) Gil de Ferran	(Brazil) Gil de Ferran	Edenbridge Racing	(United Kingdom) Rob Mears
6	Thruxton	27 May	(Brazil) Rubens Barrichello	(Brazil) Rubens Barrichello	(United Kingdom) Steve Robertson	Bowman Racing	(United Kingdom) Rob Mears
7	Silverstone	9 June	(Brazil) Rubens Barrichello	(Brazil) Rubens Barrichello	(United Kingdom) David Coulthard	Paul Stewart Racing	(Finland) Pekka Herva
8	Donington Park	23 June	(Brazil) Rubens Barrichello	(Brazil) Rubens Barrichello	(Brazil) Rubens Barrichello	West Surrey Racing	(Finland) Pekka Herva
9	Silverstone	29 June	(Brazil) Gil de Ferran	(Brazil) Gil de Ferran	(Brazil) Gil de Ferran	Edenbridge Racing	(Finland) Pekka Herva
10	Silverstone	13 July	(Brazil) Gil de Ferran	(Brazil) Rubens Barrichello	(Brazil) Gil de Ferran	Edenbridge Racing	(Finland) Pekka Herva
11	Snetterton	4 August	(Brazil) Rubens Barrichello	(Netherlands) Marcel Albers	(United Kingdom) David Coulthard	Paul Stewart Racing	(United States) Sandy Brody
12	Silverstone	26 August	(Brazil) Gil de Ferran	(Spain) Jordi Gené	(Japan) Hideki Noda	Alan Docking Racing	(United States) Sandy Brody
13	Brands Hatch	1 September	(Brazil) Gil de Ferran	(Brazil) Rubens Barrichello	(United Kingdom) David Coulthard	Paul Stewart Racing	(United States) Sandy Brody
14	Donington Park	15 September	(Brazil) Rubens Barrichello	(Brazil) Rubens Barrichello	(Brazil) Rubens Barrichello	West Surrey Racing	(United States) Sandy Brody
15	Silverstone	6 October	(Brazil) Rubens Barrichello	(Brazil) Rubens Barrichello	(Brazil) Rubens Barrichello	West Surrey Racing	(United States) Sandy Brody
16	Thruxton	13 October	(Brazil) Rubens Barrichello	(Spain) Jordi Gené	(United Kingdom) Steve Robertson	Steve Robertson Racing	(Finland) Pekka Herva

== Championship Standings ==
Pos.	Driver	SIL	THR	DON	BRH	BRH	THR	SIL	DON	SIL	SIL	SNE	SIL	BRH	DON	SIL	THR	Pts
Class A
1	(Brazil) Rubens Barrichello	Ret	1	Ret	3	4	2	2	1	5	Ret	4	5	3	1	1	5	74
2	(United Kingdom) David Coulthard	4	Ret	1	1	2	3	1	Ret	7	6	1	3	1	4	22	Ret	66
3	(Brazil) Gil de Ferran	8		7	5	1	8	7	2	1	1	5	2	2	5	6	11	54
4	(Spain) Jordi Gene	7	2	4	Ret	Ret	6	5	6	2	2	3	6	5	2	2	3	50
5	(Netherlands) Marcel Albers	3	6	6	6	9	9	3	5	Ret	4	2	4	4	3	3	2	43
6	(Sweden) Rickard Rydell	1	3	2	2	6	Ret	Ret	Ret	3	3	7	18	6	Ret	4	6	41
7	(Japan) Hideki Noda	2	4	Ret	10	5	4	4	7	4	5	12	1	7	7	5	4	36
8	(United Kingdom) Steve Robertson	5	5	5	4	Ret	1	Ret	4	Ret	Ret	11	8	8	15	9	1	32
9	(Brazil) Oswaldo Negri	Ret	Ret	Ret	7	3	Ret	6	3	Ret	7	Ret	10	Ret	DNS	8	7	9
10	(Brazil) Eduar Merhy Neto		7	3	Ret	11	5											6
11	(Belgium) Mikke van Hool	13	8	8	Ret	10	7	Ret	12	8	Ret	6	9	Ret	Ret	7	18	1
12	(Brazil) Pedro Diniz	6	Ret	DNS	Ret	7	Ret	8	8	DSQ	8	9	Ret	Ret	Ret			1
13	(Monaco) Olivier Beretta									6	21	8	7		Ret	15	9	1
14	(Brazil) Andre Ribeiro											10	11	16	Ret	6	Ret	1
15	(Republic of Ireland) Derek Higgins				8	8												0
16	(United States) Elton Julian												12	9				0
17	(Germany) Klaus Panchyrz										9							0
18	(Republic of Ireland) Bernard Dolan	10	11	Ret	Ret	Ret		Ret	13		Ret	13	13					0
19	(Soviet Union) Victor Kozankov					15	13	10	14									0
20	(Germany) Jörg Müller										10							0
21	(Soviet Union) Urmas Pold					13	14	Ret	15									0
22	(Canada) Bobby Carville															13		0
	(Denmark) Tom Kristensen										Ret							0
	(United Kingdom) Kelvin Burt															Ret		0
Class B
1	(Finland) Pekka Herva			9	9	Ret	11	9	9	9	11	Ret	15	Ret	9	11	8	98
2	(United States) Sandy Brody	9	10	11	Ret	18	12		11	Ret	13	14	14	10	8	10	10	87
3	(United Kingdom) Rob Mears	Ret	9	10	11	12	10	11	10	10	18	17	16	12	11	16	13	73
4	(United Kingdom) Steve Arnold					17	17	15	19	14	14	18	19	11	10	12	12	32
5	(United Kingdom) Alan Carruthers	Ret	12	Ret	12	14	Ret	12	16	12	16							25
6	(United Kingdom) Nigel Smith								Ret	11	12	15	DNS	13		14	14	24
7	(United States) John Lee	14	15	13	13	20	15	14	22	17	22	Ret	22	14	12	21	Ret	18
8	(Republic of Ireland) Alan Tulloch	11	13	12	Ret	DNS	DNS	13	Ret	15	20							15
9	(United Kingdom) John Wilcock	12	14	14	14	19	16	16	Ret	16	19		21	15	14	19	17	13
10	(United Kingdom) Hugo Spowers								18	DSQ	15	16	17					10
11	(Spain) Juan Serda									17	13	17					15	5
12	(United Kingdom) Paul Tickner					16												4
13	(Egypt) Sherif Al Sakkaf		Ret										20	17	Ret	20		1
14	(United Kingdom) Thornton Mustard											Ret			13	DNS	Ret	1
15	(United Kingdom) Dominic Chappell															17	Ret	1
16	(United Kingdom) Barrie Pusey			15							DNQ							0
17	(Hong Kong) Oliver Tan															Ret	16	0
18	(United Kingdom) Brian Phillips												23	18				0
19	(United Kingdom) Peter Morgan												24	19				0
20	(United Kingdom) Steve Bottoms								20									0
21	(United Kingdom) Ian Jacobs								21	DNS	23							0
	(United Kingdom) "Martin"			Ret														0
	(Italy) Guido Basile										Ret							0
	(Switzerland) Rene Wartmann										Ret							0
	(United Kingdom) Eddie Kimbell										DNS							0
	(United Kingdom) Tony Trevor											DNS						0
