= Rubens Barrichello =

Brazilian racing driver (born 1972)

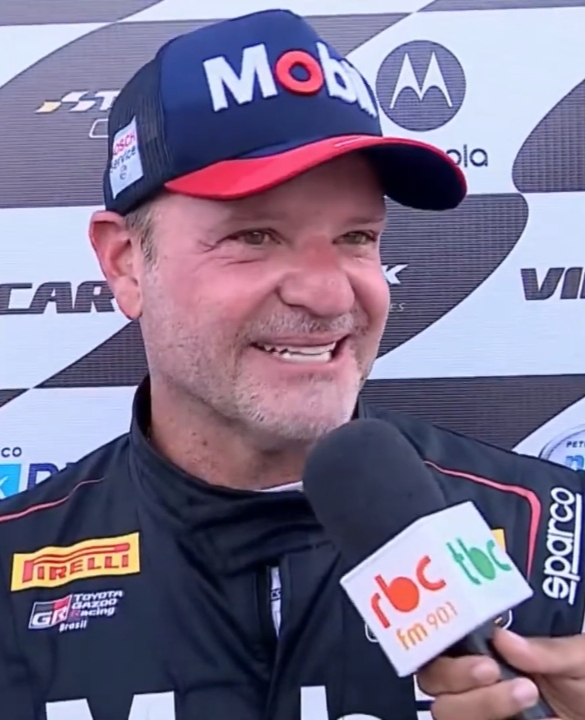
- Barrichello in 2022
- Born: Rubens Gonçalves Barrichello; 23 May 1972 (age 54); São Paulo, Brazil
- Spouse: Silvana Giaffone Alcide (m. 1997; div. 2019)
- Children: Eduardo Barrichello; Fernando Barrichello

Stock Car Pro Series career
- Debut season: 2012
- Current team: Full Time Racing
- Categorisation: FIA Platinum (until 2022); FIA Gold (2023–)
- Car number: 111
- Engine: Mitsubishi
- Former teams: Scuderia Bandeiras Sports
- Starts: 284
- Championships: 2 (2014, 2022)
- Wins: 20
- Podiums: 57
- Poles: 12
- Fastest laps: 12

Formula One World Championship career
- Nationality: (Brazil) Brazilian
- Active years: 1993–2011
- Team(s): Jordan, Stewart, Ferrari, Honda, Brawn, Williams
- Entries: 326 (322 starts)
- Championships: 0
- Wins: 11
- Podiums: 68
- Career points: 658
- Pole positions: 14
- Fastest laps: 17
- First entry: 1993 South African Grand Prix
- First win: 2000 German Grand Prix
- Last win: 2009 Italian Grand Prix
- Last entry: 2011 Brazilian Grand Prix

IndyCar Series career
- 15 races run over 1 year
- Best finish: 12th (2012)
- First race: 2012 Honda Grand Prix of St. Petersburg (St. Petersburg)
- Last race: 2012 MAVTV 500 (Auto Club)
Wins	Podiums	Poles
0	0	0

YouTube information
- Channel: Acelerados
- Years active: 2014–present
- Genres: Entertainment; motor racing; journalism
- Subscribers: 2.03 million
- Views: 569.27 million
- Last updated: 17 May 2026

Rubens Gonçalves Barrichello (Brazilian Portuguese: [ˈʁubẽjz ɡõˈsawviz baʁiˈkɛlu]; born 23 May 1972) is a Brazilian racing driver and broadcaster who competes in the Stock Car Pro Series for Scuderia Bandeiras. Nicknamed "Rubinho" (pronounced [ʁuˈbĩɲu]), (Note: Rubinho is a diminutive hypocoristic of the personal name "Rubens". Barrichello's father and paternal grandfather are both also named "Rubens".) Barrichello competed in Formula One from 1993 to 2011, and twice finished runner-up in the World Drivers' Championship in 2002 and 2004 with Ferrari; he won eleven Grands Prix across nineteen seasons. In stock car racing, Barrichello is a two-time champion of the Stock Car Pro Series in 2014 and 2022 with Full Time Sports.

Born and raised in São Paulo, Barrichello started his career in karting, winning several national titles before progressing to junior formulae in 1989. Barrichello moved to Europe the following year, winning his first title at the Formula Opel Lotus Euroseries before his victory at the 1991 British Formula Three Championship with West Surrey. He progressed to International F3000 in 1992, finishing third in his rookie season. Barrichello signed for Jordan in 1993, making his Formula One debut at the South African Grand Prix. He retained his seat for 1994, achieving his maiden podium at the Pacific Grand Prix and qualifying on pole for the Belgian Grand Prix as he finished sixth in the World Drivers' Championship. After two further seasons with Jordan—scoring another podium at the 1995 Canadian Grand Prix—Barrichello signed with Stewart for his 1997 campaign. Amidst a reliability issues-plagued debut season driving the SF01, Barrichello finished only three races, including second-place in Monaco. After a difficult 1998 campaign, Stewart improved greatly in 1999, with Barrichello taking several as well as another pole position at the French Grand Prix.

Barrichello signed for Ferrari in 2000 to partner Michael Schumacher, taking his maiden victory at the German Grand Prix that year. Barrichello twice finished runner-up to Schumacher in 2002 and 2004, contributing to five consecutive World Constructors' Championships for Ferrari with 51 podium appearances in 85 Grands Prix. After enduring a winless 2005 season, Barrichello joined Honda—later known as Brawn GP—in 2006, finishing third in the World Drivers' Championship in 2009 and contributing to a sixth Constructors' Championship. He moved to Williams in 2010, being appointed chairman of the Grand Prix Drivers' Association. After two years with Williams, Barrichello retired from Formula One, having achieved eleven wins, fourteen pole positions, seventeen fastest laps and 68 podiums, the latter of which remains the record for a non-World Champion.

Outside of Formula One, Barrichello competed in the IndyCar Series in 2012 with KV Racing Technology. He then returned to Brazil to participate in the Stock Car Series, winning the championship in 2014 and 2022. In endurance racing, Barrichello finished runner-up at the 24 Hours of Daytona in 2016 with Wayne Taylor Racing. From 2013 to 2014, he was a commentator and pundit for TV Globo, later leaving to co-host motorsport YouTube channel Acelerados.

== Early life ==
The paternal side of his family comes from Veneto, Italy (from the town of Riese, in the province of Treviso). His maternal side of the family is of Portuguese origin. Both his father and paternal grandfather are also named Rubens, and Barrichello shares his father's birthday: 23 May. Therefore, Rubens Barrichello was known as Rubinho (Portuguese for 'little Rubens'), which has become his nickname.

Barrichello won five karting titles in Brazil before going to Europe to race in the Formula Vauxhall Lotus series in 1990. In his first year, he won the championship, a feat he replicated the following year in the British Formula 3 Championship, beating David Coulthard. He very nearly joined Formula One, the highest category of single seater racing, at just nineteen years of age. Instead he competed in Formula 3000 in 1992. He finished third in the championship, and joined the Jordan Formula One team for the 1993 Formula One season. During this time, and also early in his Formula One career, Barrichello lived in Cambridge, Cambridgeshire, UK.

== Formula One career ==
=== Jordan (1993–1996) ===
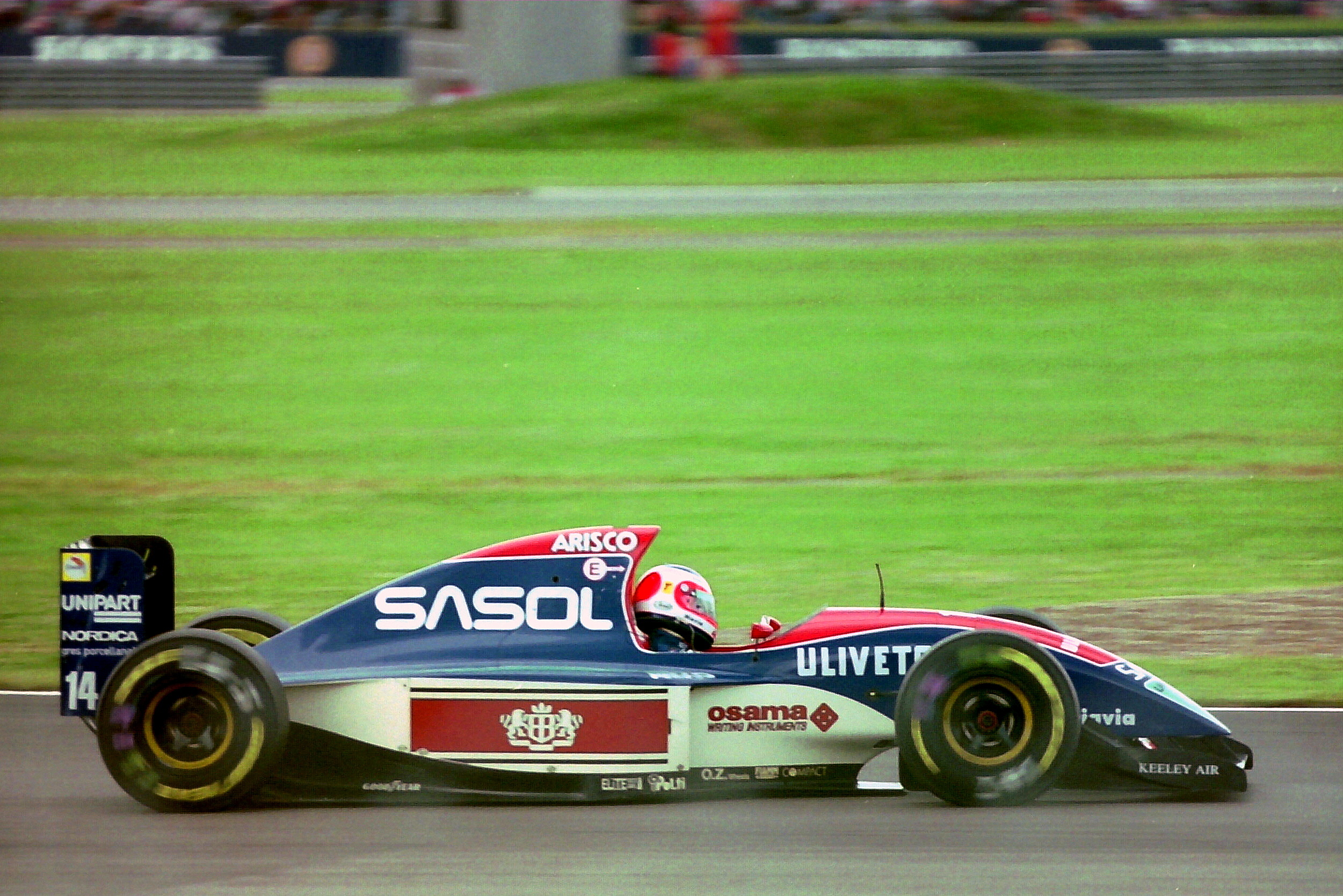
Barrichello driving for Jordan at the 1993 British Grand Prix.

In Barrichello's third race, the European Grand Prix, he started from twelfth place in very wet conditions but was fourth by the end of the first lap. He ran as high as second and was running third, having passed the Williams of Damon Hill and Alain Prost, before encountering a fuel pressure problem. His Jordan's reliability in 1993 was poor, and he finished few races. Barrichello regularly outpaced his more experienced teammates, Ivan Capelli and Thierry Boutsen. In the French Grand Prix, he almost scored his first Grand Prix point (and the team's first that year) but Michael Andretti passed him on the final lap for the sixth and final points-scoring position. His only points finish of the season came at the Japanese Grand Prix with fifth place, ahead of his new teammate Eddie Irvine. These two points put him in eighteenth place in the standings.

1994 started with a fourth place in Brazil and a third place at Aida, which was his first podium finish. These results put Barrichello in second place in the drivers' ranking, behind Michael Schumacher, who had won the two races. However, at the San Marino Grand Prix, he suffered a violent crash during Friday practice, hitting the wall at the Variante Bassa and flipping the car. The accident knocked him unconscious and threatened his life, with his tongue blocking his airway. Barrichello credited the on-track work of Sid Watkins for saving his life. The race weekend saw a succession of serious accidents, of which two were fatal: Roland Ratzenberger died during Saturday's qualifying session when he crashed his Simtek at the curva Villeneuve, while on Sunday, during the race, Barrichello's mentor Ayrton Senna crashed his Williams at Tamburello and also died. Barrichello was deeply affected by the deaths.

Later in the season, Barrichello took pole position at the Belgian Grand Prix, and led some laps at Estoril. His pole position at Spa-Francorchamps set the record for the youngest driver to secure pole position at that time. He concluded the season with fourth place in Adelaide. He finished the season sixth overall in the Drivers' Championship with nineteen points, outscoring Irvine, who scored six.

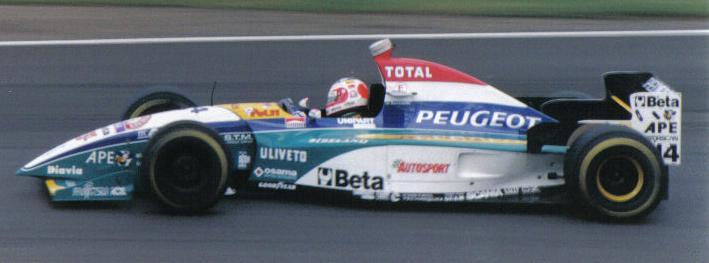
Barrichello driving for Jordan at the 1995 British Grand Prix

During the 1995 season, Barrichello scored a second-place finish in Montreal, but the Jordan cars were less reliable than in 1994 mostly because Jordan took over the works Peugeot engine contract from the McLaren team. In three races, he lost seven points on the final lap—a high-speed collision with Mark Blundell at Silverstone, and mechanical failures at Barcelona and in Hungary. Barrichello finished the season in eleventh with eleven points, one ahead of Irvine.

There were high hopes for 1996. The Benson & Hedges cigarette brand brought an infusion of sponsorship to the team. Barrichello was amongst the frontrunners in Brazil, the second race of the season, before spinning off after his brakes overheated. However, as the season progressed, Jordan became less competitive. Barrichello's relationship with team owner Eddie Jordan soured during 1996, and at the end of the year, after being linked to strong teams, including Benetton (the seat was later filled by Gerhard Berger due to the Austrian bringing in more sponsorship), he left for the newly formed Stewart Grand Prix. His final season at Jordan resulted in fourteen points.

=== Stewart (1997–1999) ===
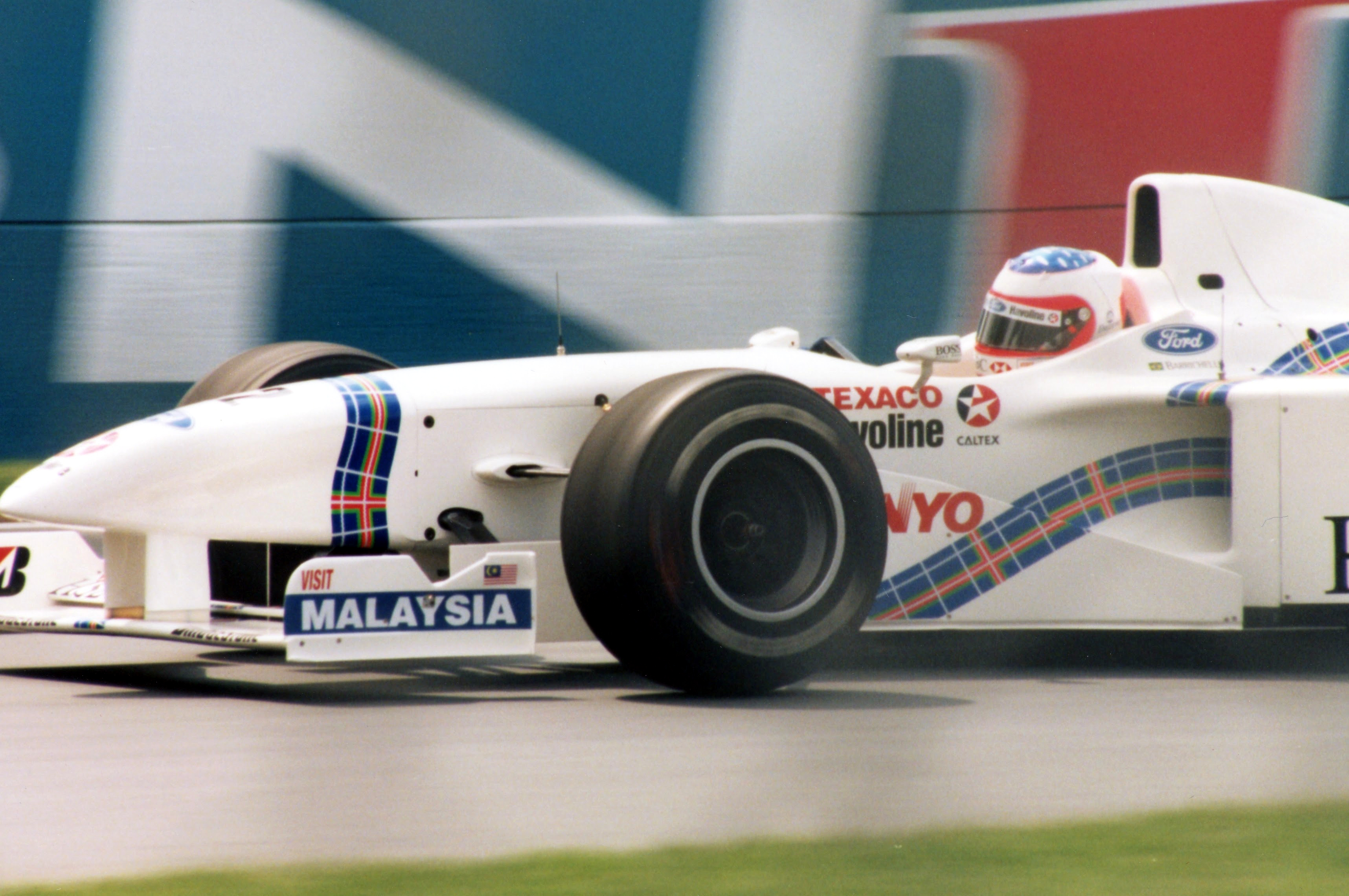
Barrichello at the 1997 Canadian Grand Prix

Stewart's debut season in 1997 saw frequent reliability problems, and Barrichello finished only three races. The highlight was a second-place finish in Monaco, which put him thirteenth in the standings. Teammate Jan Magnussen scored no points. The same year, Barrichello married Silvana Giaffone on 24 February. She is a cousin of Brazilian Indy Car drivers Felipe and Affonso Giaffone, and a niece of the Stock Car Brasil champions Affonso Giaffone Filho and Zeca Giaffone.

1998 was not much better for Stewart, with two fifth places being the team's best results. Despite the poor reliability of the team, Barrichello consistently beat teammate Magnussen, which resulted in the latter being dropped at the French Grand Prix, replaced by Jos Verstappen, another teammate beaten by Barrichello.

1999 was a much better year for the Stewart team. Barrichello qualified third at his home race in Brazil, outpacing Michael Schumacher's Ferrari, and led some laps, until his engine blew near 'Subida dos Boxes'. He also took pole position in the wet qualifying session in France, and three podium finishes, at the San Marino, French, and European Grands Prix. The latter race was won by his teammate Johnny Herbert. Despite this, Barrichello again generally outpaced his teammate. Over the course of the year, he caught the eye of Ferrari boss Jean Todt, and he was signed for the 2000 season.

=== Ferrari (2000–2005) ===
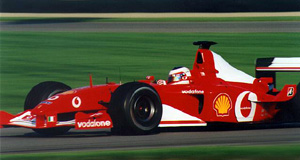
Barrichello in his Ferrari at the 2002 United States Grand Prix

In 2000, Barrichello achieved his first Grand Prix victory at the German Grand Prix at Hockenheim, when he and the team chose to stay on dry-weather tyres when it was raining on part of the circuit. This risky call saw him leap-frog the McLarens who chose to pit for wet weather tyres to win the race, having started from 18th on the grid. This was the longest any driver in Formula One history had waited for a maiden Grand Prix win at the time. Barrichello had a consistent debut season for Ferrari, finishing most races on the podium, but was outscored by Michael Schumacher, Mika Häkkinen and David Coulthard. Barrichello finished the season ranked fourth after supporting Schumacher as he battled and defeated Häkkinen for the Drivers' Championship, and helping Ferrari win the Constructors' Championship.

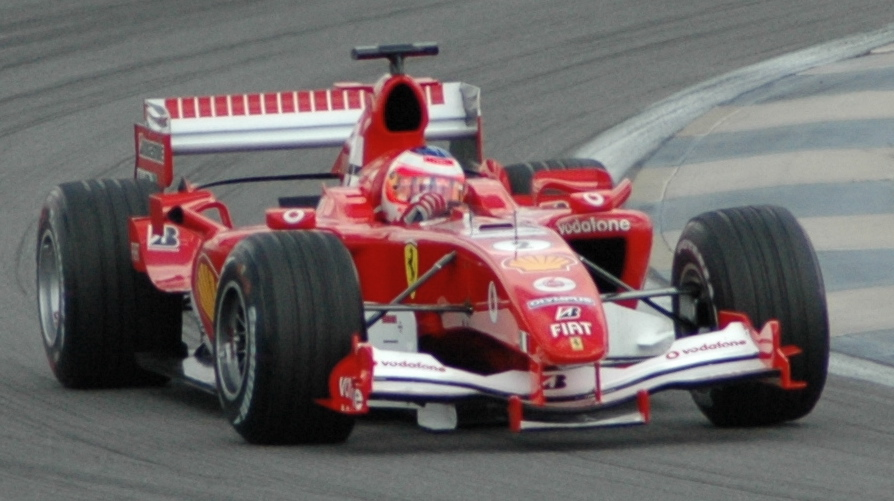
Barrichello qualifying for the 2005 United States Grand Prix

Barrichello finished the 2001 season in third place, achieving a total of ten podium finishes and scoring a total of 56 championship points. He nearly achieved a win in Monza, in which the Ferrari pit crew performed badly. He finished the season winless, and again he played a major supporting role for Schumacher, helping him win his second Drivers' Championship with Ferrari and helping the team win the Constructors' Championship for the third consecutive year.

Barrichello's success at Ferrari continued in 2002, when he won four races for the team and finished a career-best second place in the Drivers' Championship, scoring 77 championship points. The year was marked by controversy, however, when Ferrari team orders required Barrichello to allow the trailing Schumacher to pass him on the final straight of the Austrian Grand Prix to take victory. Schumacher exchanged podium places with Barrichello at the podium ceremony and gave Barrichello the winner's trophy. The drivers were fined for disrupting podium protocol and Ferrari's blatant team orders led to the FIA banning team orders beginning in 2003.

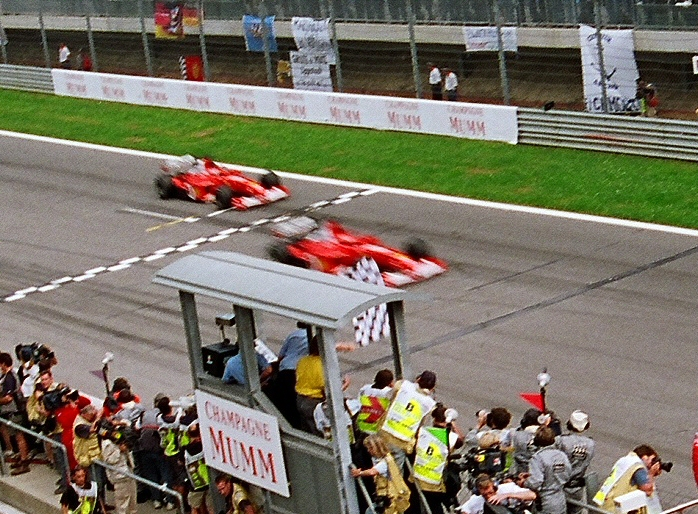
Barrichello's No. 2 status at Ferrari was made obvious after he moved over to let Michael Schumacher win at the 2002 Austrian Grand Prix.

Barrichello finished the 2003 season in fourth place, scoring 65 points, including wins at Silverstone and Suzuka, and again played a crucial role in helping Schumacher and Ferrari win the drivers' and Constructors' Championships. In the 2004 season, Barrichello finished second behind Schumacher in only seven of the first thirteen races, but he won both the 2004 Italian Grand Prix and the 2004 Chinese Grand Prix to clinch second place in the championship, finishing the year with 114 points and 14 podiums. Though Barrichello had good cars during his Ferrari era, his best result at his home race was a third place in 2004. He failed to finish eleven of the nineteen Brazilian Grands Prix in which he competed.

In the 2005 season, Ferrari lacked the pace of previous years because of the changing of tyre rules. Ferrari used Bridgestone tyres, which were less effective than those of their competitors Michelin. Barrichello's best results this season were two second places in Melbourne and then at the United States Grand Prix at Indianapolis, when all the Michelin-running cars retired after the formation lap, leaving only six cars in the race. He finished the season in eighth place in the drivers' standings with 38 points, his worst season with Ferrari.

In an August 2022 interview with Felipe Massa, he states that Barrichello had a contract with Ferrari running until 2006, after which he was to be replaced with Kimi Räikkönen for the 2007 season. But in early 2005, Honda had approached him to drive for them, and unhappy with the treatment Ferrari had given him, decided to ask the team to terminate his contract in 2005. He was thus replaced by Massa for the 2006 season.

=== Honda (2006–2008) ===
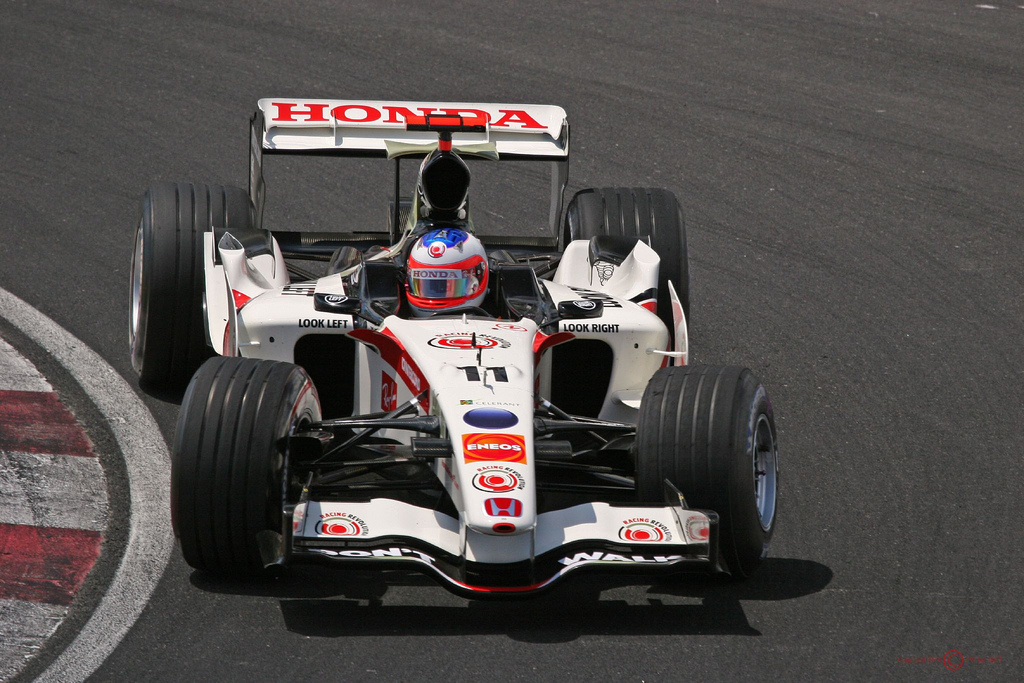
Barrichello at the 2006 Canadian Grand Prix

In August 2005, Barrichello announced that he would be leaving Ferrari at the end of the year to join Honda. Barrichello's lucky number is "11," which was the number his kart bore when he won his first race. In 2006, his new teammate Jenson Button gave Barrichello the number for his car in goodwill. Barrichello was initially outpaced by Button, and claimed that the car did not suit his driving style, particularly under braking. After modifications to the car he was able to be more competitive. In Monaco, he nearly got his first podium with the team, but then he was given a drive-through penalty for speeding in the pit lane and finished fourth. Though he lost a podium, it was the best result at the Monaco Grand Prix for Honda (as a team) or any Japanese team. Aiming to raise charitable founds for the Brazilian children, for the race Barrichello exchanged helmet liveries with Tony Kanaan, a Brazilian Indy Car driver and one of his best friends; and in the same weekend, Kanaan raced in the 2006 Indianapolis 500 race using Barrichello's helmet livery. Barrichello qualified third for the Chinese Grand Prix, ahead of Schumacher and Räikkönen. He finished the season seventh in the drivers' standings with thirty points, 26 behind Button.

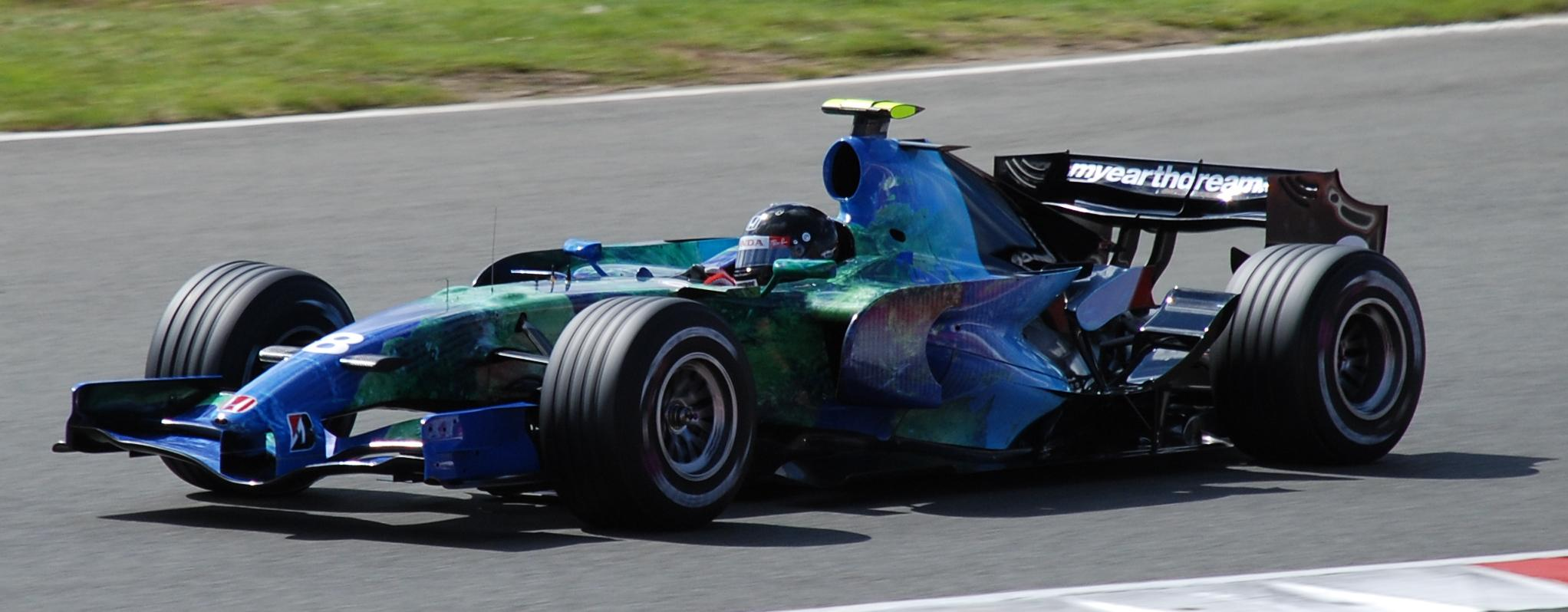
Barrichello driving for Honda at the 2007 British Grand Prix

Barrichello did not score any points during the 2007 season (unprecedented fact in his career in the category), because of the Honda RA107's lack of pace. Despite retiring only twice, a ninth place in the British Grand Prix was his best result of the season and he only once qualified in the top 10. Despite this, Honda confirmed on 19 July 2007, that Barrichello would remain with the team as a race driver for the 2008 season. This gave him the opportunity of making the five race starts he required to break Riccardo Patrese's record for the driver that has started the most Grands Prix, a record that had stood for fourteen years.

In the first race of the 2008 season, Barrichello qualified tenth, ahead of Button. He finished sixth but was disqualified for ignoring a red light at the pit exit. He also received a stop-and-go penalty during the race for entering the pits while they were closed during a safety car period. In Malaysia, gearbox problems limited his performance and he finished thirteenth. In Bahrain he again finished out of the points.

The Turkish Grand Prix was Barrichello's 257th Grand Prix, breaking Patrese's record of 256 Grand Prix starts and becoming the most experienced driver in F1 history. The particular Grand Prix at which he broke this record has been disputed, as he technically did not start some races, such as the 2002 Spanish Grand Prix, but Barrichello and Honda chose Turkey to be the location of the official celebrations.

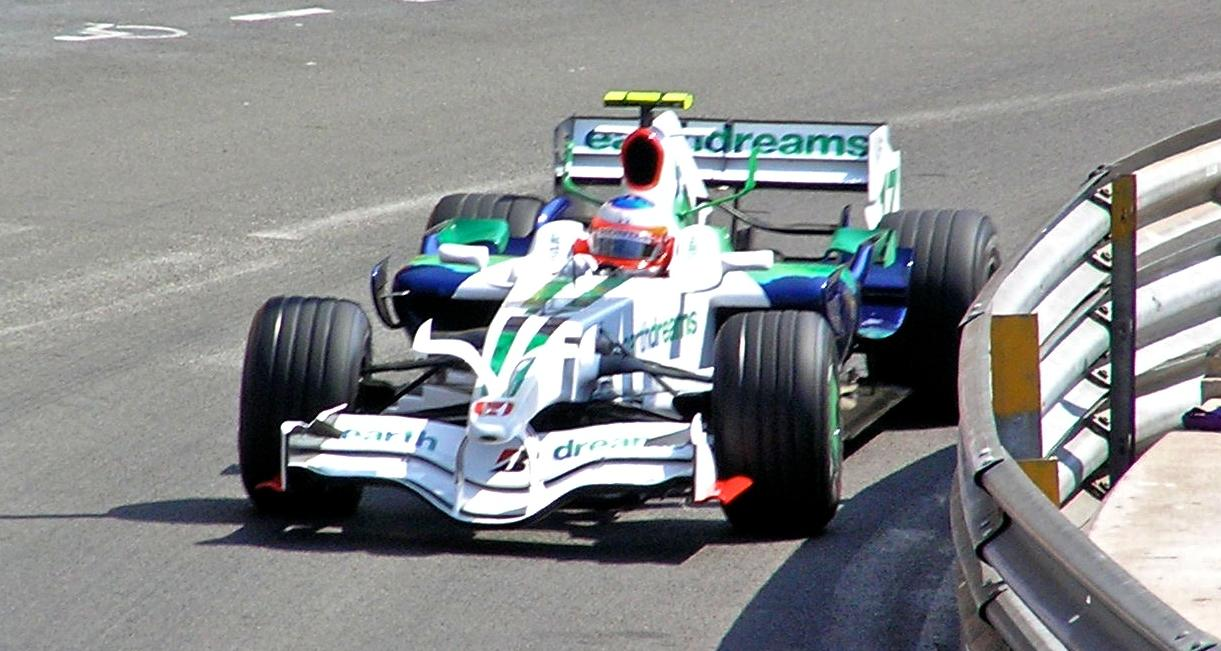
Barrichello driving for Honda at the 2008 Monaco Grand Prix

In Monaco, Barrichello scored his first points since 2006 and in Canada he scored consecutive points, finishing seventh after starting in ninth position. He led some laps because of the appearance of the safety car, but fell back down the order towards the end of the race. At Magny-Cours, Barrichello did not repeat his performance from the two previous races and qualified in seventeenth. After a gearbox change, he dropped to twentieth. In the race, he finished fourteenth.

At Silverstone, which he said he considers to be his second home, Barrichello qualified sixteenth, outpacing Button. With heavy rain on race day, through good use of an extreme wet tyre he finished 3rd, achieving his first podium since 2005. However, in Germany, a collision with David Coulthard ended his hopes for points. In Hungary, he was lapped by the leader, repeating the same performance in Valencia. In Belgium he qualified 16th but had to retire because of a gearbox fault. At a wet Monza, he was second-fastest in Friday practice and started from sixteenth on the grid. He managed to get up to ninth but as a result of using the wrong type of tyre in his second pit stop he ended up 17th. At the first ever night race in Singapore he was in a good position to score some points after pitting before the pit lane closed for the safety car period, but shortly afterwards the engine failed and he had to retire. In Japan he started from seventeenth on the grid, but managed to get up to thirteenth by the end of the race. In China he managed to get into Q2 for the first time in ten races, and would have started fourteenth. But after Mark Webber had his ten place penalty for an engine change added he was moved up to thirteenth. On race day he had a good start, and got up to tenth early on and held a strong mid-table position all race and finished eleventh, five places ahead of Button, who had struggled all weekend.

At his home Grand Prix in Brazil, Barrichello was sporting an alternative helmet design in tribute to Ingo Hoffmann, and finished fifteenth.

On 5 December 2008, Honda announced that they were quitting F1, because of the economic crisis. This led to months of uncertainty as to whether a buyer could be found, and whether they would retain Barrichello.

=== Brawn GP (2009) ===
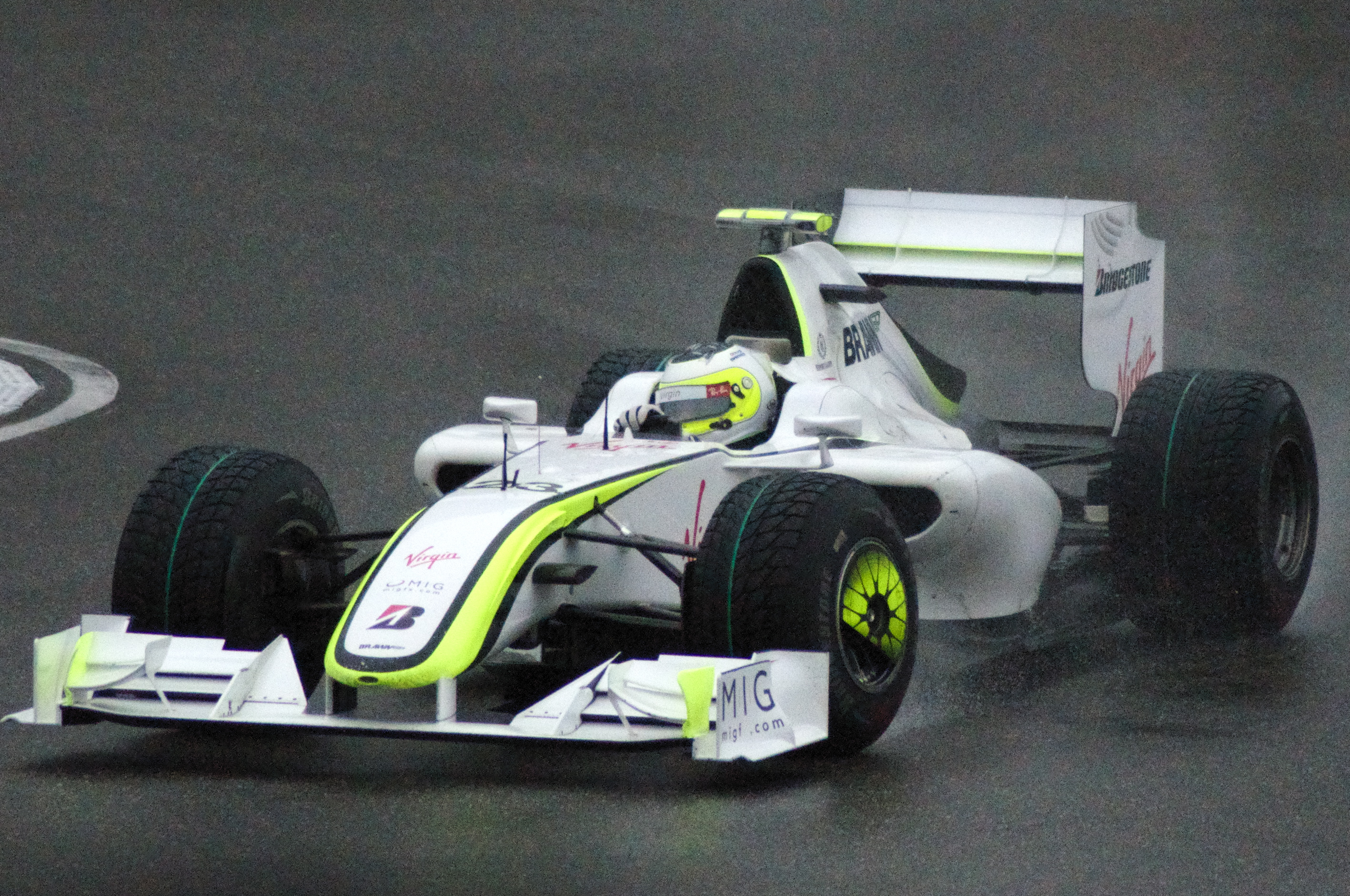
Barrichello at the 2009 Chinese Grand Prix

Just weeks before the season opener in Melbourne, team manager Ross Brawn purchased the Honda team, renaming it Brawn GP and removing the threat of possible closure. Barrichello was the subject of persistent rumours suggesting he would lose his seat to the young Bruno Senna, nephew of his friend, idol and mentor Ayrton Senna. Ultimately Brawn elected to retain Barrichello to partner Jenson Button in 2009. At Barcelona during the final pre-season test, both Barrichello and Button surprised the paddock with extremely competitive lap times, outperforming others by as much as two seconds, and foreshadowing the performance the team would show in the early races.

In Melbourne, Barrichello topped the timesheets in the first two elements of qualifying, but qualified second on the grid behind teammate Button. Despite a poor start caused by his engine slipping into anti-stall, he did well to recover and lost only a couple of positions at the start. However, he sustained damage to the front wing and rear diffuser in the first corner incident when he was bumped from behind by Heikki Kovalainen in his McLaren that saw him hit Mark Webber in the Red Bull damaging Webber's car as well as his hopes of a good finish. Despite this, Barrichello ultimately finished the race in second place after Sebastian Vettel and Robert Kubica collided with just two laps remaining. He started eighth in Malaysia after getting a grid penalty for a gearbox change and finished the race in fifth place after the race was abandoned at Sepang due to heavy rain.

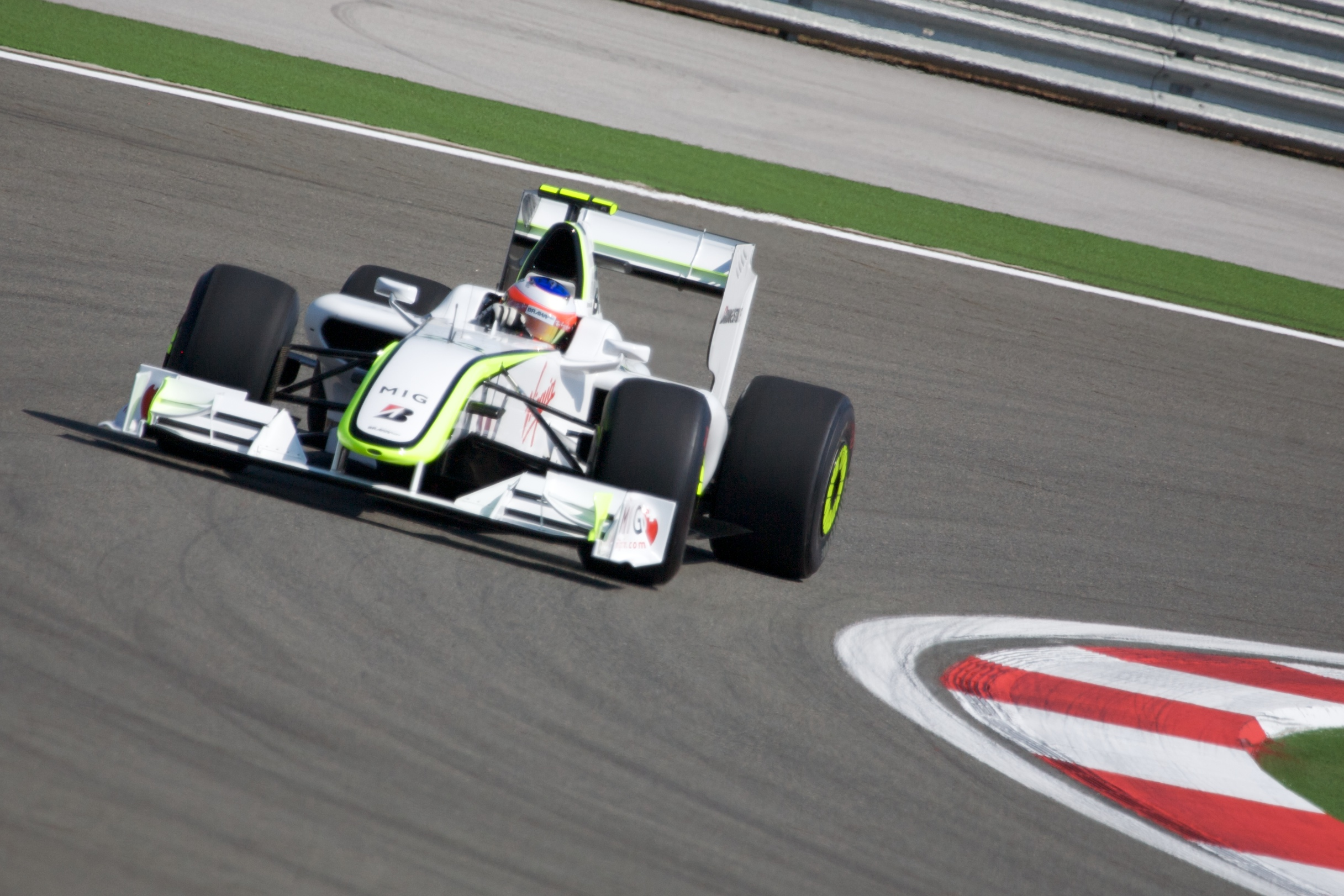
Barrichello at the 2009 Turkish Grand Prix

At Shanghai, Barrichello outpaced Button in qualifying, but struggled with his car's brakes when one of them stopped working in the first stint and finished in fourth, recording the race's fastest lap. In Bahrain, his front wing adjustor failed during his qualifying run thereby compromising his aggressive 3-pit-stop race strategy, and thus managed only fifth place. He qualified third on the grid for the Spanish Grand Prix, but overtook Button and second place man Vettel on the first straight, to lead the race in the first corner. He was unable to capitalise on his three-stop strategy as a result of a lack of pace caused by massive amounts of understeer on his third set of tyres in his third stint, finishing behind Button, who changed to a two-stop strategy during the race.

At Monaco, Barrichello was pipped for pole by a late-charging Button and Ferrari's Kimi Räikkönen. A good start saw him leapfrog the Finn into Sainte Devote. Barrichello's supersoft tyres did not last as well as Button's in the first stint and he pitted earlier than planned, and Button took a commanding lead. The top three remained unchanged for the duration of the race, save some reshuffling during the pit stop windows. At the completion of lap 47, Barrichello became the driver who has completed most laps in Formula One history, surpassing Michael Schumacher's total of 13,909 laps. In Turkey, he again had gearbox problems and retired for the first time in the season, leaving Button to increase his points advantage, while in Britain, Barrichello qualified second behind Vettel, before beating Button for the first time in 2009 en route to third place.

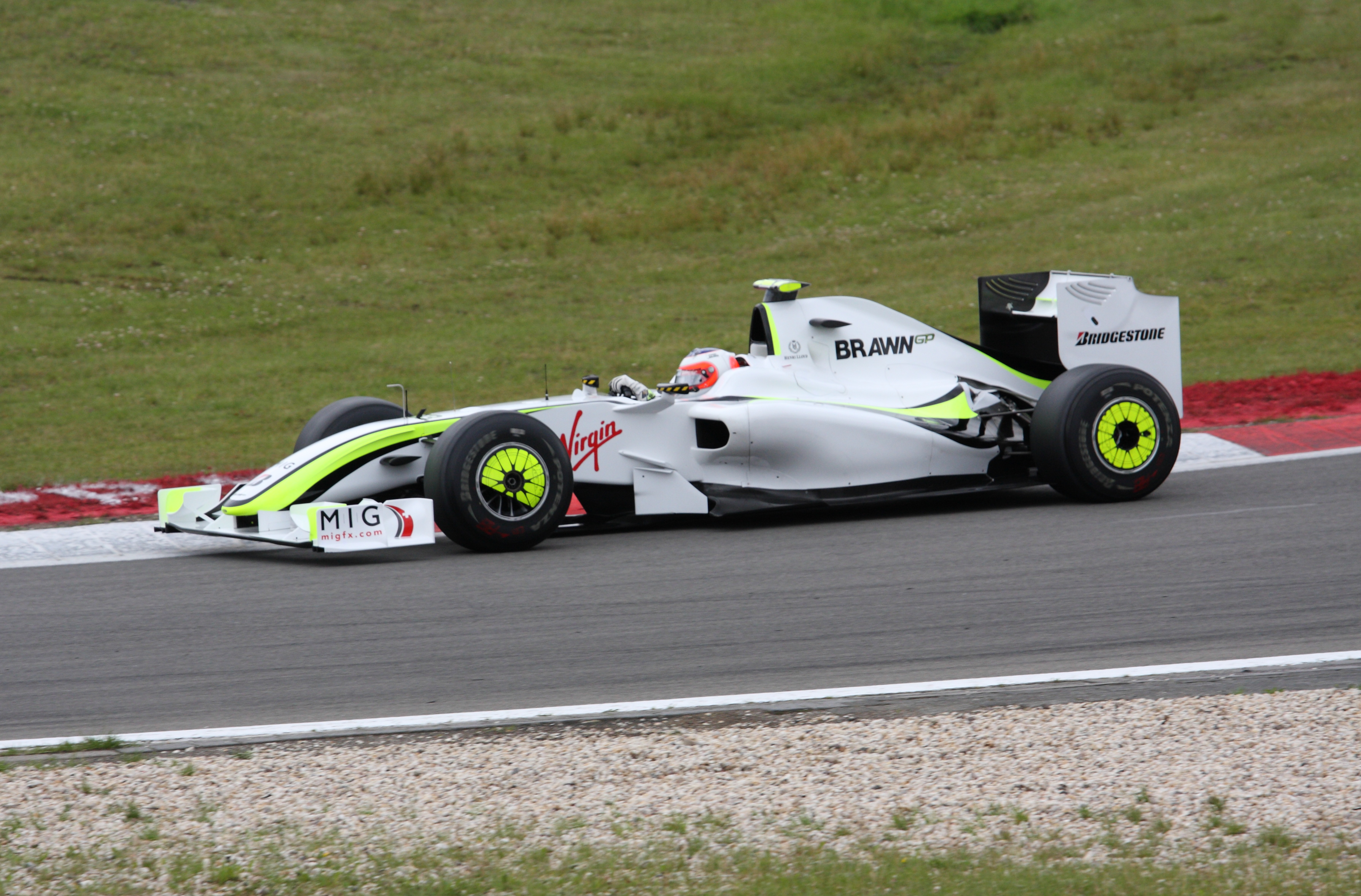
Barrichello at the 2009 German Grand Prix

In Germany, Barrichello took the lead at the first corner but after his first stop, he came out behind Felipe Massa who held him up. A fuel rig problem during his second stop meant that he finished the race in sixth, a place behind teammate Jenson Button. After the race he publicly blamed Brawn GP saying "It was a good show from the team in how to lose a race" and "They made me lose the race". Team principal Ross Brawn said of the incident "He had the 11th-fastest time of the race. You can't win a race with that speed". However, he refused to criticize Barrichello for his outburst. Barrichello has since admitted he overreacted, and he would not have won as the Red Bull cars were half a second a lap quicker than him.

In Hungary, the Brawn cars struggled and lacked pace because of problems with the tyres and aerodynamics. Barrichello finished 10th, his first finish outside the points in 2009, and three places behind Button. In Valencia, Barrichello took his tenth Grand Prix win, his first in five years and the one-hundredth win by a Brazilian driver in Formula One, allowing him to move up to second in the Championship. He paid tribute to injured compatriot Felipe Massa with a plaque on the top of his race helmet.

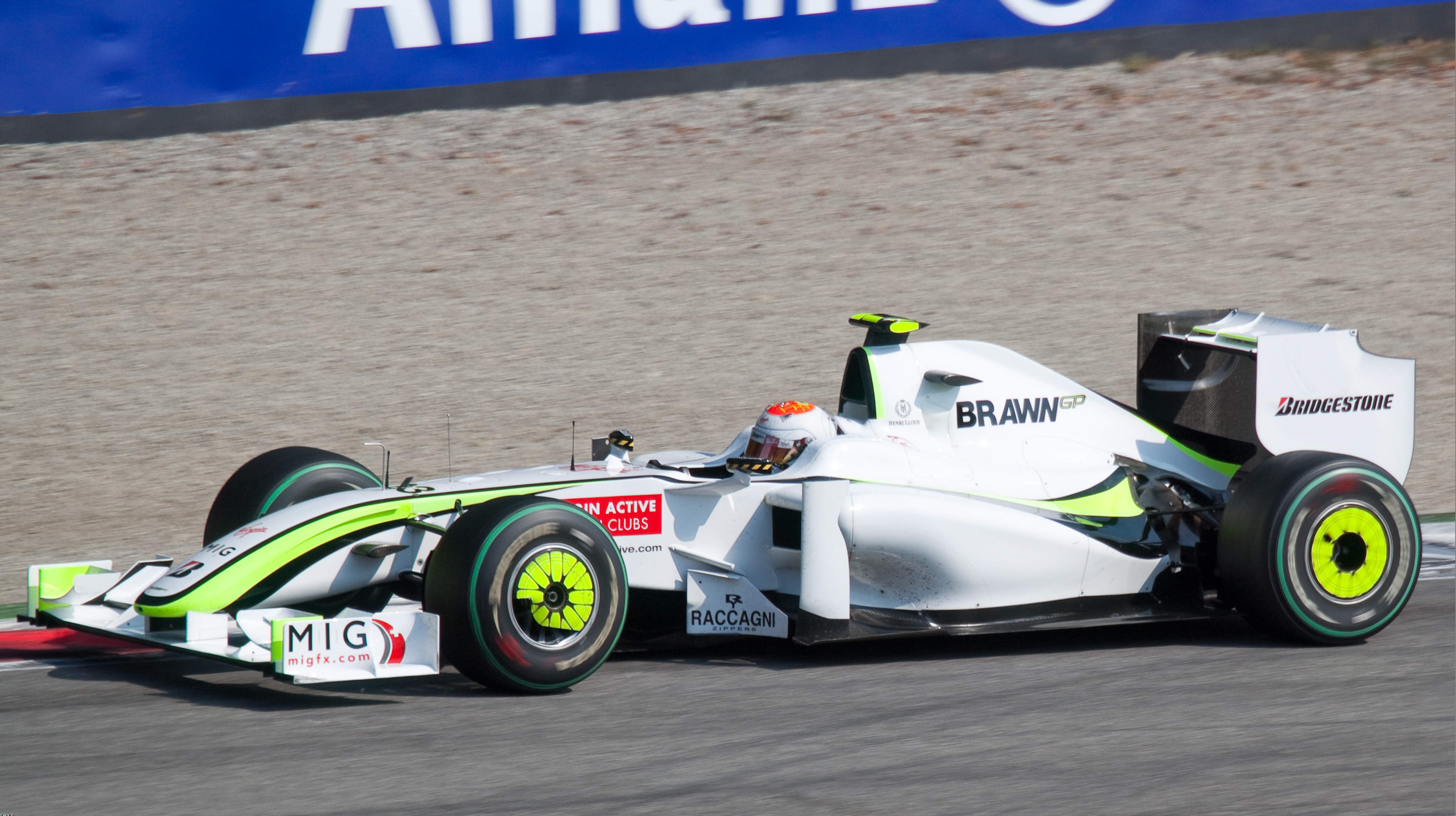
Barrichello won his second Grand Prix of the season in Monza

At Spa, Barrichello qualified fourth, but suffered from anti-stall for the third time in 2009 and he found himself last, but missed the first lap crash which took out four drivers including teammate Button. While the safety car was out he pitted and changed strategy which enabled him to climb back up to seventh. During the last three laps the car had an engine oil leak, but he still managed to finish, before his car caught fire in the pit lane after the race. At Monza, he qualified fifth, despite carrying more fuel to try a different strategy with only one stop. After passing Kovalainen at the start, Barrichello managed not to lose too much time, as he had the advantage of just one stop against Hamilton, Räikkönen and Sutil's two-stop strategy. By Hamilton's second pit stop, Button and Barrichello were running first and second. Hamilton tried to pressure Button by forcing his car, but on the last lap he crashed, giving third place to Räikkönen, and fourth to Sutil. Barrichello won the 11th race in his Formula One career, and gained more points on Button in their fight for the world title.

In Singapore, Barrichello had to change his gearbox and take a five place grid penalty. During qualifying he crashed his car while in fifth place. As a result of Nick Heidfeld starting from the pitlane, Barrichello would start ninth and finished sixth, while Button finished fifth. In Japan, he originally qualified 5th, but was given a five place grid penalty for failing to slow down during a yellow flag situation near the end of Q2 when Sébastien Buemi crashed. He was on course to finish fifth with Button behind, which would have been enough for Brawn GP to clinch the Constructors' Championship, but a safety car period in the closing stages of the race for Jaime Alguersuari's crash meant that Nico Rosberg and Heidfeld were able to stay out ahead and save fuel, dropping Barrichello to seventh. With Button finishing eighth, Barrichello closed the points deficit to fourteen and putting Brawn almost out of reach for the Constructors' title.

In Brazil, Barrichello claimed pole in a rain-soaked, qualifying session with title rivals Button and Vettel down the order in fourteenth and sixteenth, respectively. A puncture cost Barrichello a chance of taking the title to the final race, as he failed to secure enough of an advantage over Button to do so. Button finished fifth to become champion. In Abu Dhabi he qualified and finished fourth. With Vettel winning the race, he secured second in the standings, with Barrichello finishing third in the championship with 77 points.

=== Williams (2010–2011) ===
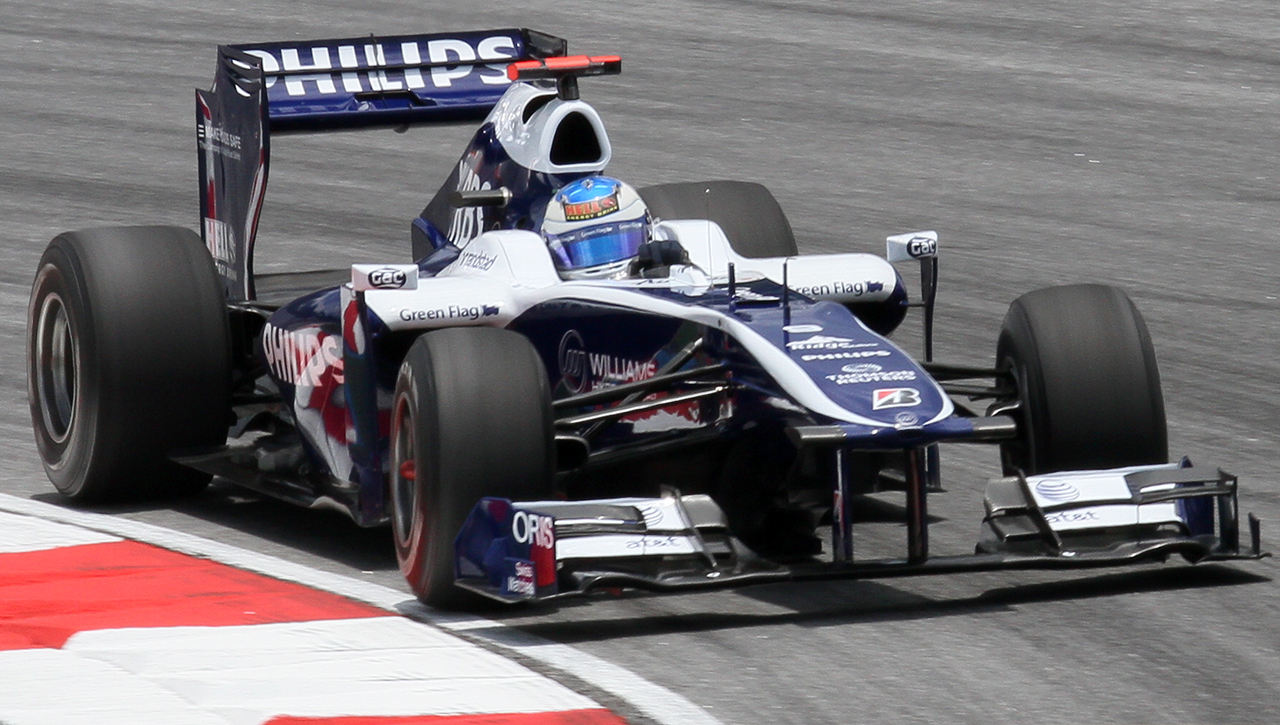
Barrichello driving for Williams at the 2010 Malaysian Grand Prix

In 2010, Barrichello was offered a contract by McLaren. He did not accept because he had already signed a contract with Williams, and did not want to renege on his pledge to that team. The McLaren seat was ultimately filled by Barrichello's 2009 teammate Jenson Button. On 2 November 2009, Williams confirmed Barrichello and Nico Hülkenberg as their official race drivers for the 2010 season. This meant that Barrichello would be in Formula One for at least another season, and would go on to become the first driver in Formula One history to compete in over three-hundred Grands Prix.

In pre-season testing, Barrichello finished at the top of the timesheets once, because of rain. In some sessions, he was outpaced by his rookie teammate Hülkenberg. Williams was the second team in terms of kilometres covered and showed some reliability, but were off pace from front-runners Red Bull, Ferrari, and McLaren.

At the first race of the season in Bahrain, Barrichello qualified eleventh on the grid, and finished tenth in the race. In Australia, he went on to finish eighth, moving him to within two points of Senna's mark. He stalled on the grid in Malaysia due to an overheating clutch, but recovered to twelfth place at the finish. In China, he finished twelfth again. In Spain, he benefited from Lewis Hamilton's late crash to score two points, finishing in ninth, despite starting eighteenth on the grid and equalling Senna's record.

In Monaco, Barrichello qualified ninth and moved up to sixth position through the first corner. Later, he had a suspension failure caused by a loose drain cover and crashed heavily. After crashing he threw the car's steering wheel out, as he was sitting in the middle of a 120 mph corner with his car on fire. This was then run over by Karun Chandhok's Hispania.

At the Turkish Grand Prix, Barrichello qualified fifteenth. Due to an overheating clutch at the start, he dropped down to twentieth position. A poor pit stop failed to help his cause and he finished in fourteenth position. It was similar at the Canadian Grand Prix, when Barrichello again finished in fourteenth. He qualified eleventh, narrowly missing Q3 but his anti-stall system kicked in at the start of the race. After recovering well, he later collided with Jaime Alguersuari when Alguersuari came across too late to cover his line, the damage blocking Barrichello's left brake duct.

In Valencia, the Williams team brought big upgrades and ran their version of the F-duct. Barrichello qualified ninth with the same time as his teammate Hülkenberg. He was running seventh when the safety car was deployed at the end of lap nine, and pulled straight into the pits. When the safety car pitted he was able to fend off Kubica to finish fourth, his highest finish so far of the season. Post-race, nine cars were investigated for speeding under the safety car, and were later given a five-second penalty. This made no difference to Barrichello's position, and he became the highest-scoring Brazilian driver in Formula One history, overhauling Ayrton Senna's career tally of 614 points, that Barrichello had been tied on since the Spanish Grand Prix. He added further points to his total with fifth at Silverstone, and tenth in Hungary, with a twelfth at Hockenheim in between.

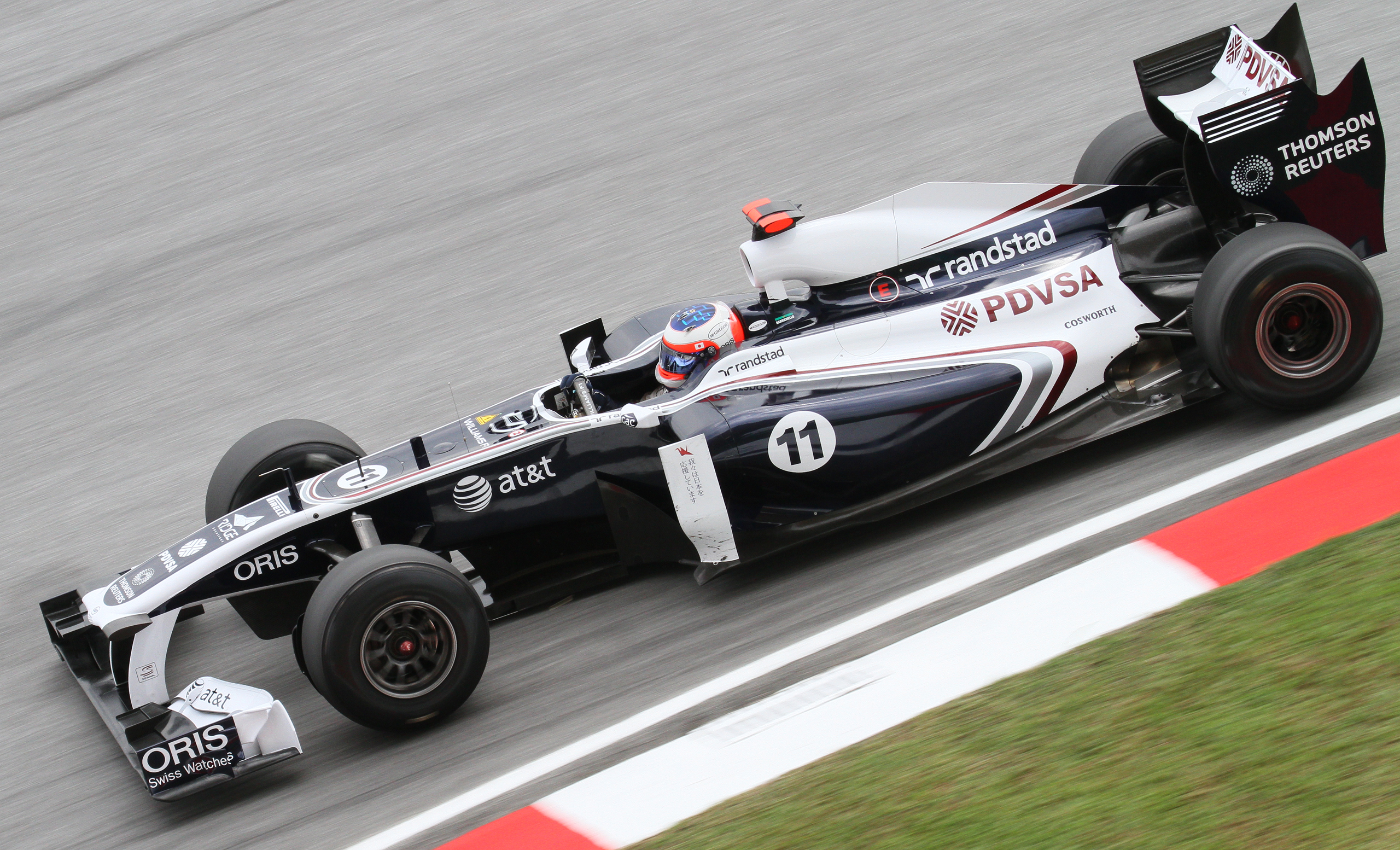
Barrichello at the 2011 Malaysian Grand Prix.

Barrichello celebrated his 300th Grand Prix at the Belgian Grand Prix, but retired in damp conditions after colliding with Fernando Alonso's Ferrari on the first lap. Before the race, he was elected as Chairman of the Grand Prix Drivers' Association to replace the outgoing Nick Heidfeld.

At Monza, Barrichello qualified in tenth, and had a rather lonely run in the race to finish in the same place to score another point. In Singapore, the FW32 sported a new front wing, and Barrichello put this to good use to set the sixth fastest time in qualifying, although Williams technical director Sam Michael reckoned the car was fast enough to be a couple of positions higher. In the race despite losing places to Robert Kubica and Nico Rosberg at the start, Barrichello had a solid run to sixth at the finish. In Japan, he qualified in a strong seventh, he raced strongly before fading to ninth as he was overtaken by the two Saubers towards the closing stages of the race.

In Korea Barrichello qualified tenth despite being blocked by Michael Schumacher. In a wet race he suffered heavy tyre wear on the intermediates that he was running on, and in the closing stages of the race he was passed by Robert Kubica and Vitantonio Liuzzi, dropping him to seventh place at the finish. At Interlagos he qualified a strong sixth in variable conditions with teammate Hülkenberg starting from pole position. After a delayed pitstop, his traditional bad luck on home soil returned when he suffered a puncture after briefly colliding with Jaime Alguersuari, costing him any chance of scoring points. In Abu Dhabi he again qualified strongly in seventh place, and maintained that position shortly after the start. However, when the safety car was deployed following Michael Schumacher's and Vitantonio Liuzzi's crash, many drivers like Robert Kubica, Vitaly Petrov and Nico Rosberg took advantage of this by pitting early. This had a negative effect as they did not need to pit again, and Barrichello finished outside of the points.

On 15 November 2010, Williams confirmed Barrichello as one of the team's drivers for the 2011 season. His teammate in 2011 was Pastor Maldonado.

In Australia, Barrichello retired with a transmission problem. He retired again in Malaysia with leaking hydraulics. He finished outside the points in the next three races before a pair of ninth places in Monaco and Canada. He came twelfth in Valencia, and thirteenth in Britain, but retired in Germany because of an oil leak. After that, he finished every race outside the points, but made no further retirements. His final race at the 2011 Brazilian Grand Prix was a quiet farewell where he finished fourteenth, ahead of former teammate Michael Schumacher.

In a 2022 interview, Barrichello revealed he was fired by Frank Williams through a phone call in early January 2012, and on 17 January 2012, Williams confirmed that Bruno Senna would replace Barrichello at Williams for the 2012 season. Senna was chosen due to his financial backing.

=== Planned comeback with Caterham (2014) ===
Former Caterham F1 team principal Manfredi Ravetto said in an interview that a contract was signed with Barrichello to replace Kamui Kobayashi for the final three races of the season, providing the car would be competitive. It was not, and the Caterham team went into administration, so Barrichello did not join the team.

== IndyCar career ==
On 25 January 2012, American journalist Robin Miller reported that Barrichello was to test an IndyCar for KV Racing Technology with friend Tony Kanaan. The test was held at Sebring over 30–31 January and 1 February. He also tested for the team at Infineon Raceway in late February.

On 1 March 2012, Barrichello joined KV Racing Technology for the 2012 season, to drive the team's No. 8 entry alongside Kanaan and E. J. Viso, sponsored by Brazilian construction company, Embrase. Barrichello raced in his first Indianapolis 500 on 27 May 2012. He led a total of two laps and finished eleventh, and in doing so won the 2012 Indianapolis 500 Rookie of the Year title. During the rest of the season, he took two top-six finishes, and finished the year in twelfth position in the championship.

== Stock Car Pro Series (formerly Stock Car Brasil) ==
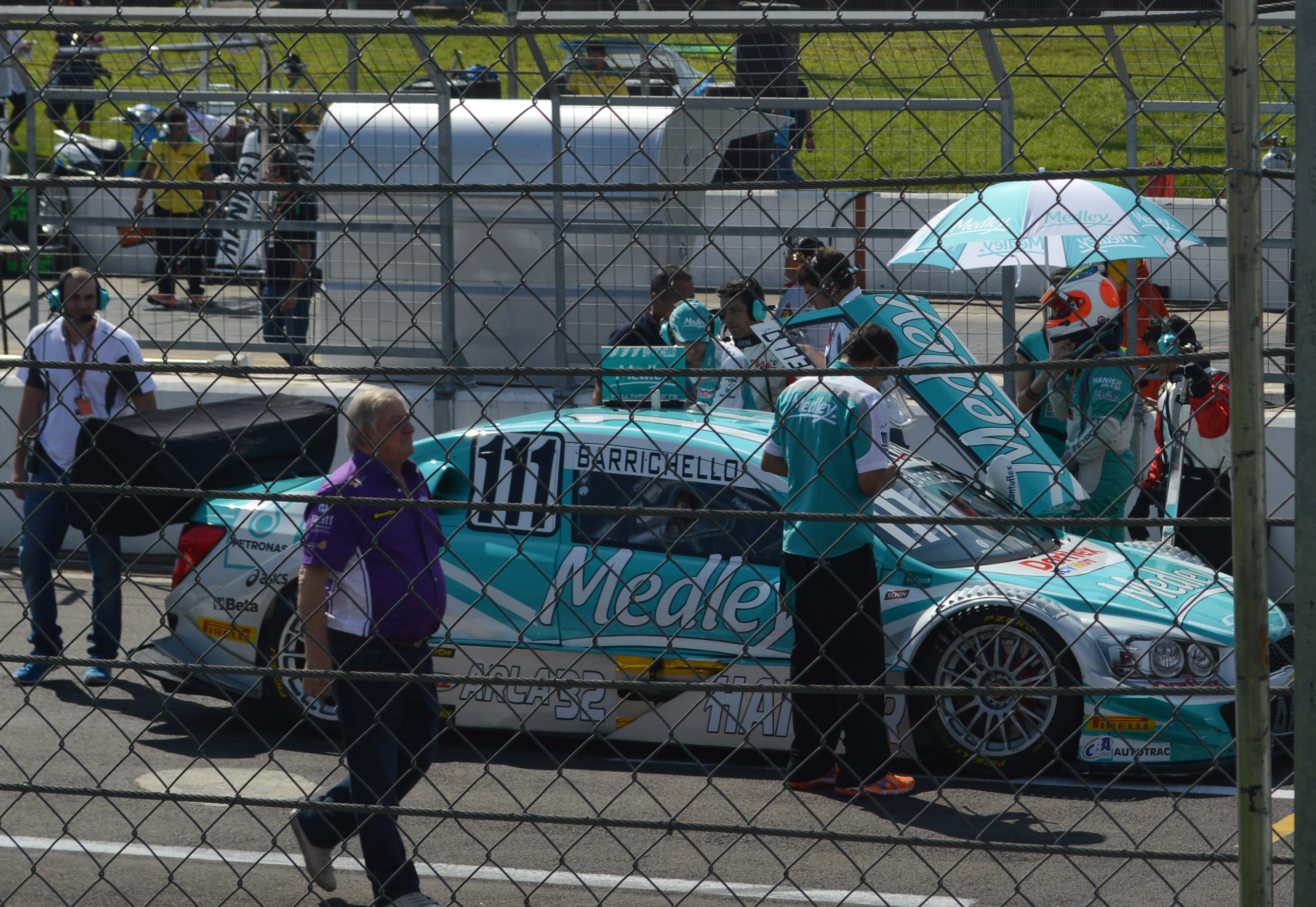
Barrichello's car in Stock Car Brasil in 2014.

Barrichello joined a Peugeot team of the Brazilian racing series Stock Car Brasil (now called Stock Car Pro Series) for the final three races of the 2012 season as a guest driver. Since 2013, he drives a Chevrolet as a regular member of the Full Time Sports team. Since Nonô Figueiredo already used the number 11, Barrichello's lucky number, he chose 111 instead. In the 2013 season, he finished the season in 8th place overall, with a best race result was a second-place finish.

Continuing to drive a Chevrolet for Full Time Sports in 2014, Barrichello was crowned the 2014 champion, winning two races and securing a further four podium finishes. This was Barrichello's first championship in 23 years, dating back to his 1991 British Formula 3 title. In 2015, Barrichello finished in fourth place overall. In 2016, he claimed three wins and nine podiums, finishing second overall behind Felipe Fraga. He finished fifth in 2017, fourth in 2018, fifth in 2019, sixth in 2020 and 2021, earning at least one individual win each year. In 2022, he won the series for the second time with three victories in the individual races.

In 2020, Toyota sent Barrichello to Argentina to compete in the Super TC 2000 and Top Race V6 championships.

== NASCAR Brasil Series ==
In 2025, Barrichello competed in the NASCAR Brasil Series, driving the No. 91 Ford Mustang for Full Time Sports. It was his first season in the championship.

During the season, Barrichello won at Interlagos and Velocitta and secured pole position for the 100 Milhas de Cascavel. Across the calendar he finished first in the Overall drivers’ standings, four points ahead of teammate Thiago Camilo.

== Australian S5000 ==
In September 2019, Barrichello made a one-off open wheel comeback when he appeared at the Sandown Raceway in Melbourne, Australia for the inaugural round of Australia's new S5000 class. S5000, which were visioned as a modern-day version of the old Formula 5000, used an Australian modified version of the Ligier JS F3, but powered by a 5.2L Ford Coyote V8 engine producing 560 hp (420 kW).

After having a shakedown run to get to know the JS F3-S5000 at the official S5000 test-day at the Phillip Island Grand Prix Circuit, racing for Australia's Team BRM with his car painted red reminiscent of his old F1 Ferrari's, Barrichello qualified 3rd at Sandown but trouble in both races saw him finish seventh in Heat 1 and fifth in Heat 2 for overall fourth place at the meeting.

== Helmet ==
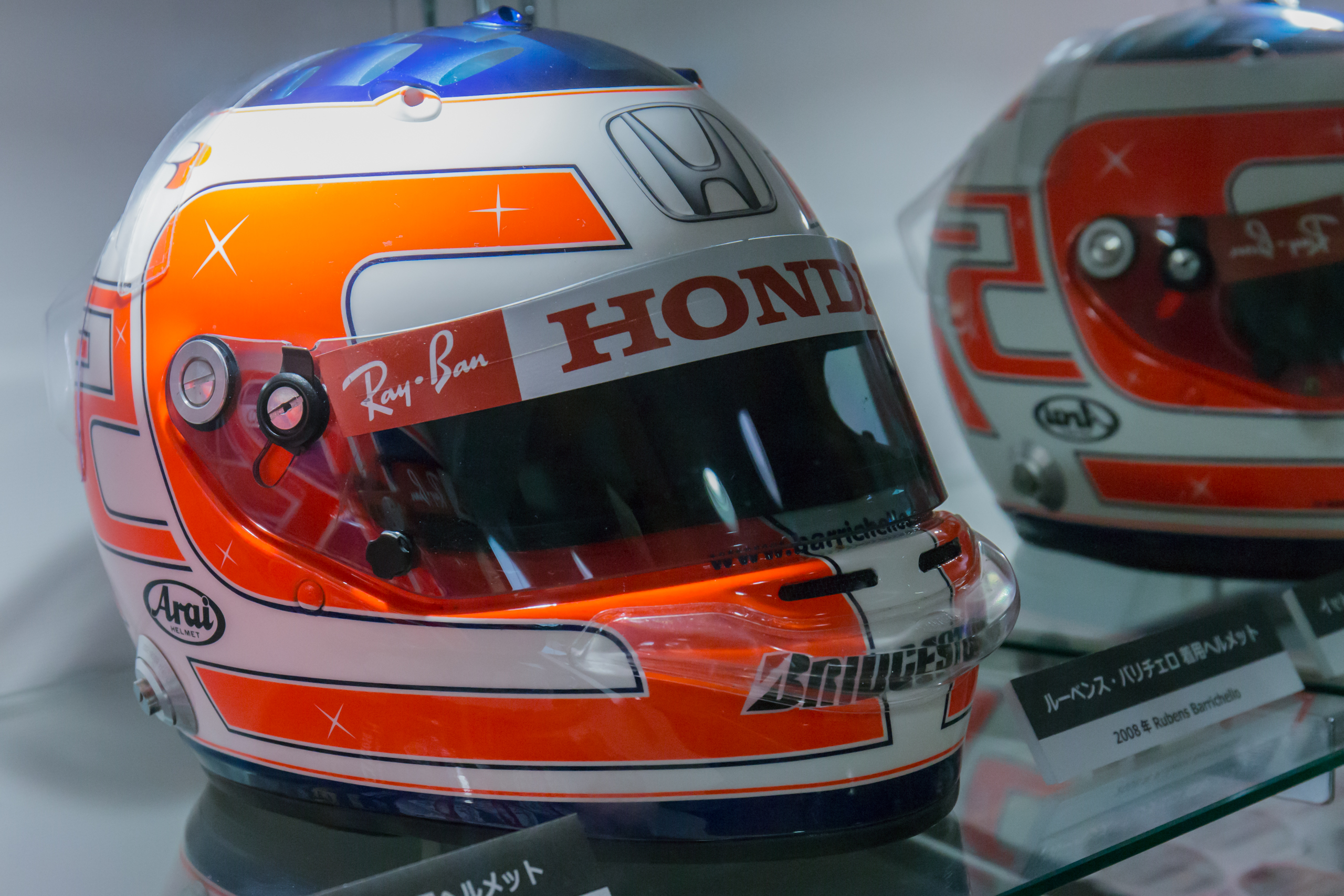
Barrichello's special helmet design worn at the 2008 Turkish Grand Prix where he celebrated his record-breaking 257th Formula One race.

Barrichello's helmet is white with an orange-red oval shape on the rear, an orange-red shape around the visor, an orange red line under the helmet and a blue circle on the top with azure and sky blue cylinders—similar to those on the helmet of former world champion Emerson Fittipaldi—with a golden star in the middle (usually five-pointed, although the recent designs had it six-pointed). The white part of the helmet changed to silver for some races during the 1999 season. After signing for Ferrari in 2000, teammate Michael Schumacher changed the colours of his helmet at the Monaco Grand Prix to avoid confusion, since the two drivers' original helmet colours were identical (the only real difference being that Schumacher's helmet had a red band which wrapped around its back from the visor, fading into gold and back).

At the 2001 Brazilian Grand Prix, the oval shape and the shape around the visor were painted to resemble the Brazilian flag, and at his 300th Grand Prix, his helmet once again carried the Brazilian flag colours. At the 2006 Monaco Grand Prix he had the helmet livery of fellow Brazilian and good friend Tony Kanaan, who in turn had Barrichello's helmet livery while racing in 2006 Indianapolis 500 which was held on the same day because they said it would be the closest either of them would get to competing in the biggest race of the year of the category the other raced in. At the 2008 Brazilian Grand Prix, Barrichello drove with a helmet in tribute to Ingo Hoffmann, former F1 driver and multiple Stock Car Brasil champion who was retiring that year. At the 1995 and 2011 Brazilian Grands Prix, he wore a helmet painted to include elements of his own helmet design, and the classic design of Ayrton Senna's helmet.

During the 2009 season, Barrichello used the Brawn GP fluorescent colours on his helmet.

== Personal life ==
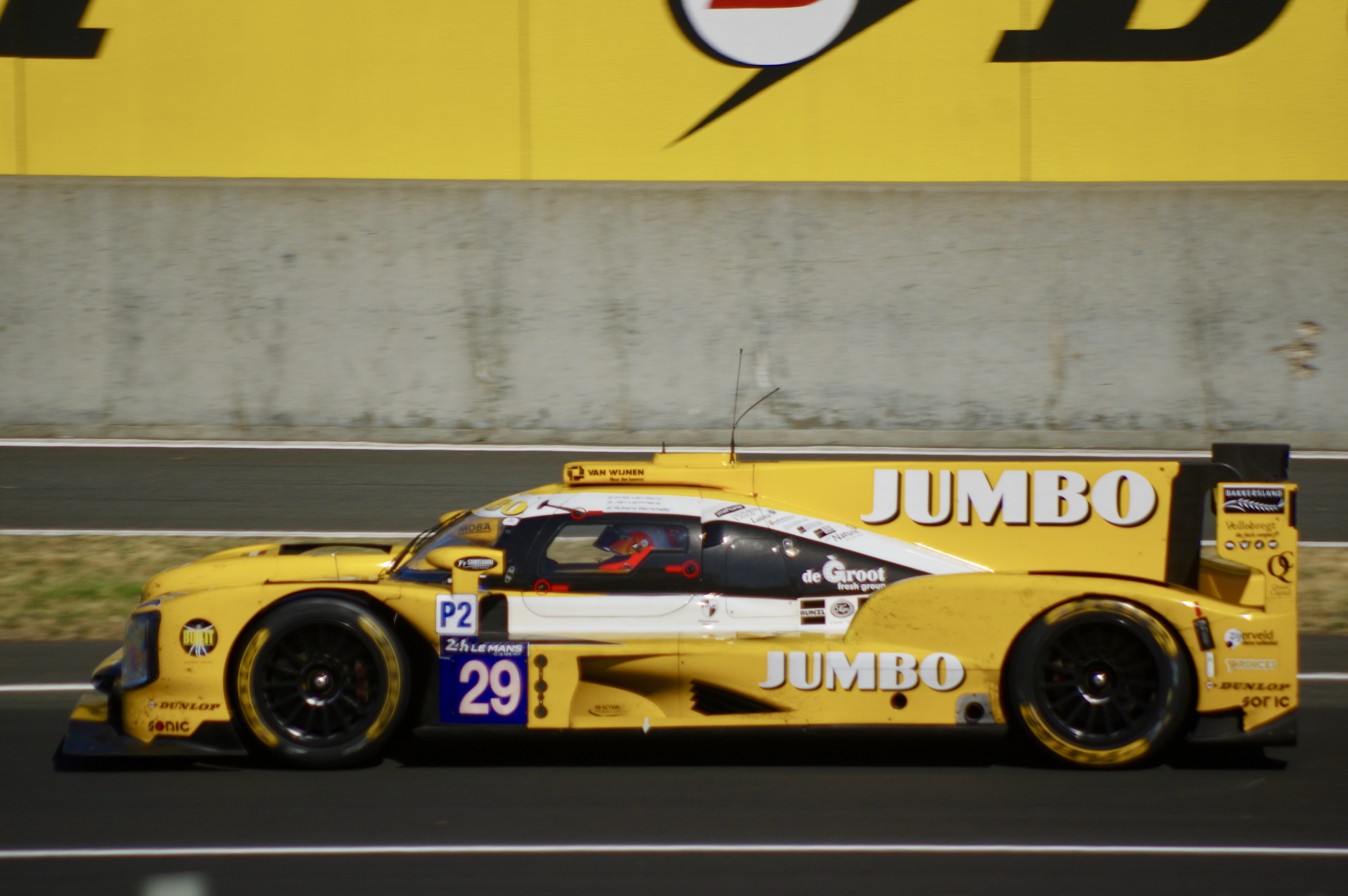
Barrichello making his Le Mans debut in 2017.

Barrichello lives in São Paulo. For commuting between races, Barrichello owned an Embraer Legacy 600.

Barrichello formerly held the fastest time by a Formula One driver around the Top Gear test track during the show's Star in a Reasonably Priced Car segment. His lap time of 1:44.3 put him ahead of the Stig by 0.1 seconds. This led to Jeremy Clarkson making frequent references to the Stig developing a deep-seated hatred of Barrichello.

In February 2018, Barrichello was rushed to hospital after suffering headaches where it was discovered that he had a benign tumour which was later removed. On F1's podcast, "Beyond The Grid", he revealed he got divorced in 2019.

Barrichello's sons Eduardo and Fernando are also racing drivers, with Eduardo currently competing in the 2026 FIA World Endurance Championship and Fernando contesting the 2026 FIA Formula 3 Championship.

== Links with SOFTSWISS and CryptoProcessing by CoinsPaid ==
In June 2024, Barrichello was appointed SOFTSWISS’ Non-Executive Director in Latin America to enhance the company's presence in Latin America.

SOFTSWISS is a software provider specializing in online casino platforms. In 2024 and 2025, investigative reporting by the German public broadcaster Bayerischer Rundfunk raised questions regarding the company’s role in the operation of online gambling platforms that were allegedly targeting jurisdictions where such activities may be restricted.

CoinsPaid and CryptoProcessing, brands associated with the Estonian company Dream Finance OÜ, have also been referenced in media reports concerning regulatory scrutiny of crypto-payment processing in the online gambling sector. In 2025, Eduardo “Dudu” and Fernando “Fefo” Barrichello were announced as brand ambassadors for these companies.

== Karting record ==
=== Karting career summary ===
Season	Series	Team	Position
1981	Brazilian District Championship São Paulo Junior		2nd
1982	Brazilian Karting Championship - Junior		9th
1982	Brazilian District Championship São Paulo Junior		2nd
1983	Brazilian District Championship São Paulo Junior		1st
1983	Brazilian Karting Championship - Junior		1st
1984	Brazilian District Championship São Paulo Junior		2nd
1984	Brazilian Karting Championship - Junior		1st
1985	Duas Horas de Interlagos Endurance Challenge		1st
1985	Brazilian Championship - B		4th
1985	Brazilian District Championship São Paulo B		1st
1986	Brazilian Championship - Senior A		1st
1986	Brazilian District Championship São Paulo A		1st
1987	FIA Karting World Championship - Formula K 135cc		9th
1987	South American Championship		1st
1987	Brazilian Championship - Senior A		1st
1987	Brazilian District Championship São Paulo A		1st
1988	Metropolitano Karting Tournament		1st
1988	São Paulo City championship A		1st
1988	Brazilian Championship - Senior A		1st
1988	Brazilian District Championship São Paulo A		1st
1998	500 Milhas de Granja Viana		1st
1999	500 Milhas de Granja Viana		2nd
2000	500 Milhas de Granja Viana		1st
2001	500 Milhas de Granja Viana		1st
2002	500 Milhas de Granja Viana		1st
2003	500 Milhas de Granja Viana		13th
2004	500 Milhas de Granja Viana	Shell	1st
2005	500 Milhas de Granja Viana		1st
2006	Desafio Internacional das Estrelas		11th
2006	500 Milhas de Granja Viana		2nd
2007	Desafio Internacional das Estrelas		4th
2008	Desafio Internacional das Estrelas		1st
2009	Desafio Internacional das Estrelas		5th
2009	500 Milhas de Granja Viana	Barrichello	3rd
2010	500 Milhas de Granja Viana	Barrichello/Head & Shoulders/Caras	5th
2010	Desafio Internacional das Estrelas		3rd
2011	500 Milhas de Granja Viana	Caras	2nd
2011	Desafio Internacional das Estrelas		4th
2015	Florida Winter Tour - Shifter ROK		2nd
2015	Rotax Max Challenge Grand Finals - DD2	Rubens Barrichello	4th
2015	Florida Winter Tour - Rotax DD2		16th
2016	ROK Cup International Final - Shifter ROK		8th
2016	CIK-FIA World Championship - KZ	Birel ART Srl	24th
2017	ROK Cup Florida - ROK Shifter	OGP	1st
2017	Florida Winter Tour - Rotax DD2		15th
2017	Florida Winter Tour - Shifter ROK		2nd
2018	Orlando Cup - Shifter ROK Senior		4th
2018	Florida Winter Tour - Shifter ROK		10th
2018	SKUSA SuperNationals XXII - KZ class	NF Piquet Sports	7th
2019	Orlando Cup - Shifter ROK Senior		6th
2019	Florida Winter Tour - Shifter ROK	NF Sports	33rd
2020	Florida Winter Tour - Shifter ROK	PSL Karting	16th
2022	Florida Winter Tour - Shifter ROK	PSL Karting (Birel ART North America)	7th
2022	Rotax Max Challenge Grand Finals - DD2	Barrichello Racing	57th
2023	Rotax Max Challenge Grand Finals - DD2 Masters	Barrichello Racing	

== Racing record ==
=== Career summary ===
Season	Series	Team	Races	Wins	Poles	F/Laps	Podiums	Points	Position
1989	Brazilian Formula Ford 1600	Arisco	?	1	?	?	?	?	**3rd**
1990	Formula Opel Lotus Euroseries	Draco Racing	11	6	7	7	8	157	**1st**
1990	Formula Vauxhall Lotus	Draco Racing	4	0	1	0	2	34	11th
1990	Formula Three Sudamericana	Guido Forti Dallara	3	1	1	?	1	12	8th
1990	Formula Opel Lotus Nations Cup	Brazil	1	1	1	1	1	N/A	**2nd**
1991	British Formula 3 Championship	West Surrey Racing	16	4	9	7	8	74	**1st**
1991	Macau Grand Prix	West Surrey Racing	1	0	0	0	0	N/A	5th
1991	Masters of Formula 3	West Surrey Racing	1	0	1	1	0	N/A	6th
1991	F3 Fuji Cup	West Surrey Racing	1	0	0	0	0	N/A	NC
1992	International Formula 3000	Il Barone Rampante	10	0	0	2	4	27	**3rd**
1992	Macau Grand Prix	Edenbridge/Theodore Racing	1	0	0	0	0	N/A	7th
1993	Formula One	Sasol Jordan	16	0	0	0	0	2	18th
1993	Formula One Indoor Trophy	Sasol Jordan	3	3	3	3	3	12	**1st**
1994	Formula One	Sasol Jordan Hart	16	0	1	0	1	19	6th
1995	Formula One	Total Jordan Peugeot	17	0	0	0	1	11	11th
1996	Formula One	Benson & Hedges Total Jordan Peugeot	16	0	0	0	0	14	8th
1997	Formula One	HSBC Malaysia Stewart Ford	17	0	0	0	1	6	13th
1998	Formula One	HSBC Stewart Ford	16	0	0	0	0	4	12th
1999	Formula One	HSBC Stewart Ford	16	0	1	0	3	21	7th
2000	Formula One	Scuderia Ferrari Marlboro	17	1	1	3	9	62	4th
2001	Formula One	Scuderia Ferrari Marlboro	17	0	0	0	10	56	**3rd**
2002	Formula One	Scuderia Ferrari Marlboro	17	4	3	5	10	77	**2nd**
2003	Formula One	Scuderia Ferrari Marlboro	16	2	3	3	8	65	4th
2004	Formula One	Scuderia Ferrari Marlboro	18	2	4	4	14	114	**2nd**
2005	Formula One	Scuderia Ferrari Marlboro	19	0	0	0	4	38	8th
2006	Formula One	Lucky Strike Honda Racing F1 Team	18	0	0	0	0	30	7th
2007	Formula One	Honda Racing F1 Team	17	0	0	0	0	0	20th
2008	Formula One	Honda Racing F1 Team	18	0	0	0	1	11	14th
2009	Formula One	Brawn GP F1 Team	17	2	1	2	6	77	**3rd**
2010	Formula One	AT&T Williams	19	0	0	0	0	47	10th
2011	Formula One	AT&T Williams	19	0	0	0	0	4	17th
2012	IndyCar Series	KV Racing Technology	15	0	0	0	0	289	12th
2012	Stock Car Brasil	Medley Full Time	3	0	0	0	0	0†	NC†
2013	Stock Car Brasil	Full Time Sports	12	0	1	1	1	120	8th
2014	Stock Car Brasil	Full Time Sports	21	2	2	2	6	234	**1st**
2015	Stock Car Brasil	Full Time Sports	21	0	0	3	3	188	4th
2015	United SportsCar Championship	Starworks Motorsport	1	0	0	0	0	23	30th
2016	Stock Car Brasil	Full Time Sports	21	3	3	0	9	295	**2nd**
2016	IMSA SportsCar Championship	Wayne Taylor Racing	2	0	0	0	1	53	23rd
2017	Stock Car Brasil	Full Time Sports	22	2	1	2	4	251	5th
2017	24 Hours of Le Mans – LMP2	Racing Team Nederland	1	0	0	0	0	N/A	11th
2018	Stock Car Brasil	Full Time Sports	21	2	2	1	5	242	4th
2018	Blancpain GT Series Endurance Cup	Strakka Racing	1	0	0	0	0	0	NC
2019	Stock Car Brasil	Full Time Sports	21	4	0	0	6	310	5th
2019	IMSA SportsCar Championship	JDC-Miller Motorsports	1	0	0	0	0	26	32nd
2019	Australian S5000 Exhibition	Team BRM	3	0	0	0	1	N/A	N/A
2020	Stock Car Brasil	Full Time Sports	18	1	0	0	3	234	6th
2020	Súper TC2000	Toyota Gazoo Racing YPF Infinia	19	2	1	2	2	64	7th
2020	Top Race V6	Toyota Gazoo Racing YPF Infinia	5	1	1	0	2	83	4th
2021	Stock Car Brasil	Full Time Sports	23	2	2	1	5	282	6th
2021	Súper TC2000	Toyota Gazoo Racing YPF Infinia	9	1	1	1	1	18	14th
2021	Porsche Endurance Series	N/A	3	0	0	0	0	42	20th
2021	Porsche All-Star Race Brasil	N/A	1	0	0	0	1	N/A	**3rd**
2022	Stock Car Pro Series	Full Time Sports	22	3	1	1	7	330	**1st**
2022	Italian GT Championship - GT3	Scuderia Baldini 27	1	1	1	0	1	?	?
2022	Porsche Endurance Series	N/A	3	0	0	0	0	21st	
2023	Stock Car Pro Series	Mobil Ale Full Time	24	1	0	0	5	260	7th
2023	24H GT Series - 992	Q1 Trackracing	1	0	0	0	0	16	18th*
2023	Porsche Endurance Series	N/A	3	0	0	1	0	10th	83
2024	Stock Car Pro Series	Full Time Sports	24	0	0	0	1	645	14th
2024	International GT Open	Il Barone Rampante	1	0	0	0	0	0	NC†
2024	Porsche Endurance Series	N/A	3	1	0	2	0	195	**1st**
2025	Stock Car Pro Series	Full Time/Cavaleiro Sports	21	0	0	1	0	507	13th
2025	NASCAR Brasil Series	Full Time Sports	19	6	3	3	9	300	**1st**
2026	Stock Car Pro Series	Scuderia Bandeiras Sports	10	0	0	0	1	327	22nd*
2026	Stock Car Pro Series	Full Time Racing	1	0	0	0	0	327	22nd*

^{†} As Barrichello was a guest driver, he was ineligible to score points.
^{*} Season still in progress.

=== Complete British Formula Three Championship results ===
(key) (Races in bold indicate pole position) (Races in italics indicate fastest lap)

Year	Entrant	Engine	1	2	3	4	5	6	7	8	9	10	11	12	13	14	15	16	DC	Points
1991	West Surrey Racing	Mugen-Honda	**SIL**; Ret	**THR**; 1	DON; Ret	BRH; 3	BRH; 4	**THR**; 2	**SIL**; 2	**DON**; 1	SIL; 5	SIL; Ret	**SNE**; 4	SIL; 5	BRH; 3	**DON**; 1	**SIL**; 1	**THR**; 5	1st	74

=== Complete International Formula 3000 results ===
(key) (Races in bold indicate pole position; results in italics indicate fastest lap)

Year	Entrant	Chassis	Engine	1	2	3	4	5	6	7	8	9	10	Pos.	Points
1992	Il Barone Rampante	Reynard 92D	Judd	SIL; 2	PAU; 3	CAT; 2	PER; Ret	HOC; 6						3rd	27
1992	Il Barone Rampante	Reynard 92D	Ford Cosworth						NÜR; 3	SPA; 5	ALB; 6	NOG; 6	MAG; 5	3rd	27

=== Complete Formula One results ===
(key) (Races in bold indicate pole position; results in italics indicate fastest lap)

Year	Entrant	Chassis	Engine	1	2	3	4	5	6	7	8	9	10	11	12	13	14	15	16	17	18	19	WDC	Points
1993	Sasol Jordan	Jordan 193	Hart 1035 3.5 V10	RSA; Ret	BRA; Ret	EUR; 10^{†}	SMR; Ret	ESP; 12	MON; 9	CAN; Ret	FRA; 7	GBR; 10	GER; Ret	HUN; Ret	BEL; Ret	ITA; Ret	POR; 13	JPN; 5	AUS; 11				18th	2
1994	Sasol Jordan	Jordan 194	Hart 1035 3.5 V10	BRA; 4	PAC; 3	SMR; DNQ	MON; Ret	ESP; Ret	CAN; 7	FRA; Ret	GBR; 4	GER; Ret	HUN; Ret	**BEL**; Ret	ITA; 4	POR; 4	EUR; 12	JPN; Ret	AUS; 4				6th	19
1995	Total Jordan Peugeot	Jordan 195	Peugeot A10 3.0 V10	BRA; Ret	ARG; Ret	SMR; Ret	ESP; 7	MON; Ret	CAN; 2	FRA; 6	GBR; 11^{†}	GER; Ret	HUN; 7	BEL; 6	ITA; Ret	POR; 11	EUR; 4	PAC; Ret	JPN; Ret	AUS; Ret			11th	11
1996	Benson & Hedges Total Jordan Peugeot	Jordan 196	Peugeot A12 EV5 3.0 V10	AUS; Ret	BRA; Ret	ARG; 4	EUR; 5	SMR; 5	MON; Ret	ESP; Ret	CAN; Ret	FRA; 9	GBR; 4	GER; 6	HUN; 6	BEL; Ret	ITA; 5	POR; Ret	JPN; 9				8th	14
1997	HSBC Malaysia Stewart Ford	Stewart SF01	Ford VJ Zetec-R 3.0 V10	AUS; Ret	BRA; Ret	ARG; Ret	SMR; Ret	MON; 2	ESP; Ret	CAN; Ret	FRA; Ret	GBR; Ret	GER; Ret	HUN; Ret	BEL; Ret	ITA; 13	AUT; 14^{†}	LUX; Ret	JPN; Ret	EUR; Ret			13th	6
1998	HSBC Stewart Ford	Stewart SF02	Ford VJ Zetec-R 3.0 V10	AUS; Ret	BRA; Ret	ARG; 10	SMR; Ret	ESP; 5	MON; Ret	CAN; 5	FRA; 10	GBR; Ret	AUT; Ret	GER; Ret	HUN; Ret	BEL; DNS	ITA; 10	LUX; 11	JPN; Ret				12th	4
1999	HSBC Stewart Ford	Stewart SF3	Ford CR-1 3.0 V10	AUS; 5	BRA; Ret	SMR; 3	MON; 9^{†}	ESP; DSQ	CAN; Ret	**FRA**; 3	GBR; 8	AUT; Ret	GER; Ret	HUN; 5	BEL; 10	ITA; 4	EUR; 3	MAL; 5	JPN; 8				7th	21
2000	Scuderia Ferrari Marlboro	Ferrari F1-2000	Ferrari 049 3.0 V10	AUS; 2	BRA; Ret	SMR; 4	**GBR**; Ret	ESP; 3	EUR; 4	MON; 2	CAN; 2	FRA; 3	AUT; 3	GER; 1	HUN; 4	BEL; Ret	ITA; Ret	USA; 2	JPN; 4	MAL; 3			4th	62
2001	Scuderia Ferrari Marlboro	Ferrari F2001	Ferrari 050 3.0 V10	AUS; 3	MAL; 2	BRA; Ret	SMR; 3	ESP; Ret	AUT; 3	MON; 2	CAN; Ret	EUR; 5	FRA; 3	GBR; 3	GER; 2	HUN; 2	BEL; 5	ITA; 2	USA; 15^{†}	JPN; 5			**3rd**	**56**
2002	Scuderia Ferrari Marlboro	Ferrari F2001B	Ferrari 050 3.0 V10	**AUS**; Ret	MAL; Ret	BRA; Ret																	**2nd**	**77**
2002	Scuderia Ferrari Marlboro	Ferrari F2002	Ferrari 051 3.0 V10				SMR; 2	ESP; DNS	**AUT**; 2	MON; 7	CAN; 3	EUR; 1	GBR; 2	FRA; DNS	GER; 4	**HUN**; 1	BEL; 2	ITA; 1	USA; 1	JPN; 2			**2nd**	**77**
2003	Scuderia Ferrari Marlboro	Ferrari F2002	Ferrari 051 3.0 V10	AUS; Ret	MAL; 2	**BRA**; Ret	SMR; 3																4th	65
2003	Scuderia Ferrari Marlboro	Ferrari F2003-GA	Ferrari 052 3.0 V10					ESP; 3	AUT; 3	MON; 8	CAN; 5	EUR; 3	FRA; 7	**GBR**; 1	GER; Ret	HUN; Ret	ITA; 3	USA; Ret	**JPN**; 1				4th	65
2004	Scuderia Ferrari Marlboro	Ferrari F2004	Ferrari 053 3.0 V10	AUS; 2	MAL; 4	BHR; 2	SMR; 6	ESP; 2	MON; 3	EUR; 2	CAN; 2	**USA**; 2	FRA; 3	GBR; 3	GER; 12	HUN; 2	BEL; 3	**ITA**; 1	**CHN**; 1	JPN; Ret	**BRA**; 3		**2nd**	**114**
2005	Scuderia Ferrari Marlboro	Ferrari F2004M	Ferrari 053 3.0 V10	AUS; 2	MAL; Ret																		8th	38
2005	Scuderia Ferrari Marlboro	Ferrari F2005	Ferrari 055 3.0 V10			BHR; 9	SMR; Ret	ESP; 9	MON; 8	EUR; 3	CAN; 3	USA; 2	FRA; 9	GBR; 7	GER; 10	HUN; 10	TUR; 10	ITA; 12	BEL; 5	BRA; 6	JPN; 11	CHN; 12	8th	38
2006	Lucky Strike Honda Racing F1 Team	Honda RA106	Honda RA806E 2.4 V8	BHR; 15	MAL; 10	AUS; 7	SMR; 10	EUR; 5	ESP; 7	MON; 4	GBR; 10	CAN; Ret	USA; 6	FRA; Ret	GER; Ret	HUN; 4	TUR; 8	ITA; 6	CHN; 6	JPN; 12	BRA; 7		7th	30
2007	Honda Racing F1 Team	Honda RA107	Honda RA807E 2.4 V8	AUS; 11	MAL; 11	BHR; 13	ESP; 10	MON; 10	CAN; 12	USA; Ret	FRA; 11	GBR; 9	EUR; 11	HUN; 18	TUR; 17	ITA; 10	BEL; 13	JPN; 10	CHN; 15	BRA; Ret			20th	0
2008	Honda Racing F1 Team	Honda RA108	Honda RA808E 2.4 V8	AUS; DSQ	MAL; 13	BHR; 11	ESP; Ret	TUR; 14	MON; 6	CAN; 7	FRA; 14	GBR; 3	GER; Ret	HUN; 16	EUR; 16	BEL; Ret	ITA; 17	SIN; Ret	JPN; 13	CHN; 11	BRA; 15		14th	11
2009	Brawn GP F1 Team	Brawn BGP 001	Mercedes-Benz FO 108W 2.4 V8	AUS; 2	MAL; 5^{‡}	CHN; 4	BHR; 5	ESP; 2	MON; 2	TUR; Ret	GBR; 3	GER; 6	HUN; 10	EUR; 1	BEL; 7	ITA; 1	SIN; 6	JPN; 7	**BRA**; 8	ABU; 4			**3rd**	**77**
2010	AT&T Williams	Williams FW32	Cosworth CA2010 2.4 V8	BHR; 10	AUS; 8	MAL; 12	CHN; 12	ESP; 9	MON; Ret	TUR; 14	CAN; 14	EUR; 4	GBR; 5	GER; 12	HUN; 10	BEL; Ret	ITA; 10	SIN; 6	JPN; 9	KOR; 7	BRA; 14	ABU; 12	10th	47
2011	AT&T Williams	Williams FW33	Cosworth CA2011 2.4 V8	AUS; Ret	MAL; Ret	CHN; 13	TUR; 15	ESP; 17	MON; 9	CAN; 9	EUR; 12	GBR; 13	GER; Ret	HUN; 13	BEL; 16	ITA; 12	SIN; 13	JPN; 17	KOR; 12	IND; 15	ABU; 12	BRA; 14	17th	4

^{†} Driver did not finish the Grand Prix, but was classified as he completed over 90% of the race distance.

^{‡} Half-points awarded as less than 75% of race distance was completed.

=== Complete IndyCar Series results ===
(key)

Year	Team	No.	Chassis	Engine	1	2	3	4	5	6	7	8	9	10	11	12	13	14	15	Rank	Points	Ref
2012	KV Racing Technology	8	Dallara DW12	Chevrolet	STP; 17	ALA; 8	LBH; 9	SAO; 10	INDY; 11	DET; 25	TXS; DNS	MIL; 10	IOW; 7	TOR; 11	EDM; 13	MDO; 15	SNM; 4	BAL; 5	FON; 22	12th	289	

Years	Teams	Races	Starts	Poles	Wins	Podiums (Non-win)**	Top 10s (Non-podium)***	Championships
1	1	15	14	0	0	0	7	0

** Podium (Non-win) indicates 2nd- or 3rd-place finishes
*** Top 10s (Non-podium) indicates 4th- through 10th-place finishes

==== Indianapolis 500 ====
Year	Chassis	Engine	Start	Finish	Team
2012	Dallara	Chevrolet	10	11	KV Racing Technology

=== Complete Stock Car Pro Series results ===
(key) (Races in bold indicate pole position; results in italics indicate fastest lap)

Year	Team	Car	1	2	3	4	5	6	7	8	9	10	11	12	13	14	15	16	17	18	19	20	21	22	23	24	25	Rank	Points
2012	Medley Full Time	Peugeot 408	INT	CTB	VEL	RBP	LON	RIO	SAL	CAS	TAR	CTB; 22	BSB; Ret	INT; 22														NC‡	0‡
2013	Full Time Sports	Chevrolet Sonic	INT; 25	CUR; 19	TAR; 20	SAL; 2	BRA; 4	CAS; 13	RBP; 5	**CAS**; 25	VEL; 12	CUR; 10	BRA; 11	INT; 8														8th	120
2014	Full Time Sports	Chevrolet Sonic	INT; 1; 9	SCZ; 1; 16	SCZ; 2 DNS	BRA; 1; 24	BRA; 2; 4	GOI; 1; 9	GOI; 2; 2	**GOI**; **1**; 1	CAS; 1; 1	CAS; 2; 18	CUR; 1; 7	CUR; 2; 2	VEL; 1; 4	VEL; 2; 6	SCZ; 1; 19	SCZ; 2; 11	TAR; 1; 9	TAR; 2; 2	SAL; 1; 4	SAL; 2; 4	**CUR**; **1**; 3					1st	234
2015	Full Time Sports	Chevrolet Sonic	GOI; 1; 14	RBP; 1; 6	RBP; 2; 6	VEL; 1; 4	VEL; 2; 5	CUR; 1; 9	CUR; 2; 2	SCZ; 1; 3	SCZ; 2 Ret	CUR; 1; 11	CUR; 2; 8	GOI; 1; 20	CAS; 1; 23	CAS; 2; 10	MOU; 1; 5	MOU; 2; 4	CUR; 1; 12	CUR; 2; 6	TAR; 1; 6	TAR; 2; 2	INT; 1 Ret					4th	188
2016	Full Time Sports	Chevrolet Cruze	CUR; 1; 20	VEL; 1; 6	VEL; 2; 5	GOI; 1; 11	GOI; 2; 3	SCZ; 1; 21	SCZ; 2; 2	**TAR**; **1**; 17†	TAR; 2; 11	CAS; 1; 17	CAS; 2; 1	**INT**; **1**; 2	LON; 1; 6	LON; 2; 1	CUR; 1; 11	CUR; 2; 2	**GOI**; **1**; 1	GOI; 2; 5	CRI; 1; 3	CRI; 2; 22†	INT; 1; 2					2nd	295
2017	Full Time Sports	Chevrolet Cruze	GOI; 1 Ret	GOI; 2; 4	VEL; 1; 7	VEL; 2; 5	**SCZ**; **1**; 1	SCZ; 2; 17	CAS; 1; 6	CAS; 2; 5	CUR; 1; 4	CRI; 1 Ret	CRI; 2; 14	VCA; 1; 16	VCA; 2 Ret	LON; 1; 3	LON; 2; 3	ARG; 1; 21	ARG; 2; 1	TAR; 1; 9	TAR; 2; 18	GOI; 1; 6	GOI; 2; 17	INT; 1; 5				5th	251
2018	Full Time Sports	Chevrolet Cruze	INT; 1; 2	**CUR**; **1**; 13	CUR; 2; 4	VEL; 1 Ret	VEL; 2; 9	**LON**; **1**; 4	LON; 2; 2	SCZ; 1 Ret	SCZ; 2; 6	GOI; 1; 1	MOU; 1; 9	MOU; 2; 7	CAS; 1; 7	CAS; 2; 14	VCA; 1; 11	VCA; 2; 3	TAR; 1; 1	TAR; 2; 10	GOI; 1; 5	GOI; 2 Ret	INT; 1; 6					4th	242
2019	Full Time Sports	Chevrolet Cruze	VEL; 1; 2	VCA; 1; 8	VCA; 2; 1	GOI; 1; 5	GOI; 2; 1	LON; 1 Ret	LON; 2; 8	SCZ; 1; 9	SCZ; 2; 12	MOU; 1; 14	MOU; 2; 1	INT; 1 Ret	VEL; 1; 7	VEL; 2; 1	CAS; 1; 5	CAS; 2; 3	VCA; 1; 13	VCA; 2; 5	GOI; 1; 19	GOI; 2; 4	INT; 1; 8					5th	310
2020	Full Time Sports	Toyota Corolla	GOI; 1; 7	GOI; 2; 1	INT; 1; 7	INT; 2; 4	LON; 1; 7	LON; 2; 2	CAS; 1; 7	CAS; 2; 14	CAS; 3; 21	VCA; 1; 14	VCA; 2; 5	CUR; 1; 8	CUR; 2; 5	CUR; 3; 4	GOI; 1; 9	GOI; 2; 9	GOI; 3; 3	INT; 1; 16								6th	234
2021	Full Time Sports	Toyota Corolla	GOI; 1; 15	GOI; 2; 19	INT; 1 DSQ	INT; 2 DNS	VCA; 1; 4	VCA; 2; 2	**VCA**; **1**; 1	VCA; 2; 2	CAS; 1; 5	CAS; 2; 14	CUR; 1; 6	CUR; 2; 6	CUR; 1; 8	CUR; 2 Ret	**GOI**; **1**; 1	GOI; 2; 8	GOI; 1; 5	GOI; 2; 15	VCA; 1; 16	VCA; 2; 9	SCZ; 1; 9	SCZ; 2; 3	INT; 1; 22	INT; 2; 18		6th	282
2022	Full Time Sports	Toyota Corolla	INT; 1 Ret	**GOI**; **1**; 1	GOI; 2; 1	RIO; 1 Ret	RIO; 2 DNS	VCA; 1; 2	VCA; 2; 2	VEL; 1; 6	VEL; 2; 4	VEL; 1; 14	VEL; 2; 10	INT; 1; 13	INT; 2; 22	VCA; 1; 8	VCA; 2; 5	SCZ; 1; 2	SCZ; 2; 1	GOI; 1; 7	GOI; 2; 6	GOI; 1; 5	GOI; 2; 8	INT; 1; 3	INT; 2; 11			1st	330
2023	Mobil Ale Full Time	Toyota Corolla	GOI; 1; 14	GOI; 2; 6	INT; 1; 7	INT; 2; 4	TAR; 1; 19	TAR; 2; 1	CAS; 1; 16	CAS; 2 Ret	INT; 1; 10	INT; 2; 6	VCA; 1; 5	VCA; 2; 5	GOI; 1; 15	GOI; 2; 3	VEL; 1; 8	VEL; 2; 3	BUE; 1; 9	BUE; 2; 2	VCA; 1; 11	VCA; 2; 22	CAS; 1; 17	CAS; 2 Ret	INT; 1; 18	INT; 2; 3		7th	260
2024	Mobil Ale Full Time	Toyota Corolla	GOI; 1; 15	GOI; 2; 4	VCA; 1 Ret	VCA; 2 C	INT; 1 Ret	INT; 2; 18	CAS; 1; 14	CAS; 2; 13	VCA; 1; 7	VCA; 2; 10	VCA; 3; 11	GOI; 1; 6	GOI; 2; 8	BLH; 1; 3	BLH; 2; 15	VEL; 1; 5	VEL; 2; 21†	BUE; 1; 10	BUE; 2; 12	URU; 1; 6	URU; 2; 10	GOI; 1; 24	GOI; 2; 22	INT; 1; 23	INT; 2; 22	14th	645
2025	Full Time Cavaleiro	Toyota Corolla Cross	INT; 1; 10	CAS; 1; 9	CAS; 2; 12	VEL; 1; 14	VEL; 2; 12	VCA; 1; 26	VCA; 2; 8	CRS; 1; 15	CRS; 2; 14	CAS; 1; 15	CAS; 2; 27	VCA; 1	VCA; 2	VCA; 1; 4	VCA; 2; 4	MOU; 1; 20	MOU; 2; 11	CUI; 1; 22	CUI; 2; 19	BRA; 1 Ret	BRA; 2; 12	INT; 1 Ret	INT; 2; 5			13th	507
2026	Scuderia Bandeiras Sports	Mitsubishi Eclipse Cross	CRS; 1; 3	CRS; 2; 5	CAS; 1; 11	CAS; 2; 12	INT; 1 Ret	INT; 2 DSQ	GOI; 1; 18	GOI; 2; 10	CUI; 1; 6	CUI; 2; 4	VCA; 1	VCA; 2	SCZ; 1	SCZ; 2	CRS; 1	CRS; 2										22nd*	327*
2026	Full Time Racing	Mitsubishi Eclipse Cross																	BRA; 1; 24	CAS; 1	CAS; 2	VEL; 1	INT; 1	INT; 2				22nd*	327*

^{‡} Ineligible for championship points.
^{†} Driver did not finish the race, but was classified as he completed over 90% of the race distance.
^{*} Season still in progress.

=== Complete IMSA SportsCar Championship results ===
(key) (Races in bold indicate pole position; results in italics indicate fastest lap)

Year	Team	Class	Make	Engine	1	2	3	4	5	6	7	8	9	10	Rank	Points
2015	Starworks Motorsport	P	Riley Mk XXVI DP	Dinan (BMW) S62B50 5.0 L V8	DAY; 9	SEB	LBH	LGA	DET	WGL	MOS	ELK	COA	PET	30th	23
2016	Wayne Taylor Racing	P	Dallara Corvette DP	Chevrolet LS9 5.5 L V8	DAY; 2	SEB; 12	LBH	LGA	DET	WGL	MOS	ELK	COA	PET	23rd	53
2019	JDC-Miller Motorsports	DPi	Cadillac DPi-V.R	Cadillac LT4 5.5 L V8	DAY; 5	SEB	LBH	MDO	DET	WGL	MOS	ELK	LGA	PET	32nd	26

=== 24 Hours of Daytona ===
24 Hours of Daytona results
Year	Team	Car	Co-drivers	Class	Laps	Position	Class Pos.
2013	(Brazil) Dener Motorsport	Porsche 911 GT3 Cup	(Brazil) Nonô Figueiredo (Brazil) Felipe Giaffone (Brazil) Tony Kanaan (Brazil) Ricardo Maurício	GT	352	46 ^{DNF}	28 ^{DNF}
2015	(United States) Starworks Motorsport	Riley MkXXVI-BMW	(Thailand) Tor Graves (New Zealand) Brendon Hartley (United States) Ryan Hunter-Reay (United States) Scott Mayer	P	426	39 ^{DNF}	10 ^{DNF}
2016	(United States) Wayne Taylor Racing	Chevrolet Corvette DP	(United States) Ricky Taylor (United States) Jordan Taylor (Italy) Max Angelelli	P	736	2	2
2019	(United States) JDC-Miller Motorsports	Cadillac DPi-V.R	(Canada) Misha Goikhberg (France) Tristan Vautier (Canada) Devlin DeFrancesco	DPi	586	5	5

=== 24 Hours of Le Mans ===
Year	Team	Co-Drivers	Car	Class	Laps	Pos.	Class Pos.
2017	(Netherlands) Racing Team Nederland	(Netherlands) Jan Lammers (Netherlands) Frits van Eerd	Dallara P217-Gibson	LMP2	344	13th	11th

== See also ==
- Formula One drivers from Brazil

Sporting positions
Preceded by Mika Häkkinen	British Formula Three Champion; 1991	Succeeded by Gil de Ferran
Preceded by Johnny Herbert	Formula One Indoor Trophy; Winner; 1993	Succeeded by Luca Badoer
Preceded by Michael Schumacher	Desafio Internacional das Estrelas; Winner; 2008	Succeeded by Michael Schumacher
Preceded by Ricardo Maurício	Stock Car Brasil; Champion; 2014	Succeeded by Marcos Gomes
Preceded by Gabriel Casagrande	Stock Car Pro Series; Champion; 2022	Succeeded by Gabriel Casagrande
Preceded by Vitor Genz	NASCAR Brasil Series; Brazilian Champion; 2025	Succeeded by Incumbent
Preceded by Gabriel Casagrande; Alex Seid	NASCAR Brasil Series; Overall Champion; 2025	Succeeded by Incumbent
Awards
Preceded by J. R. Hildebrand	Indianapolis 500; Rookie of the Year; 2012	Succeeded by Carlos Muñoz
Trade union offices
Preceded by Nick Heidfeld	GPDA Chairman; 2010–2012	Succeeded by Pedro de la Rosa
Records
Preceded by Andrea de Cesaris; 22 years, 308 days (1982 United States GP West)	Youngest Grand Prix polesitter 22 years, 97 days (1994 Belgian Grand Prix)	Succeeded by Fernando Alonso; 21 years, 236 days (2003 Malaysian GP)
Preceded by Juan Pablo Montoya; 259.828 km/h (2002 Italian GP)	Fastest Grand Prix qualifying lap 260.395 km/h (2004 Italian GP)	Succeeded by Kimi Räikkönen; 262.242 km/h (2018 Italian GP)
Preceded by Riccardo Patrese; 257 entries, 256 starts (1977 – 1993)	Most Grand Prix entries 326 entries, 322 starts (1993 – 2011), 258th entry at the 2008 Turkish GP; 257th start at the 2008 French GP	Succeeded by Kimi Räikkönen; 353 entries, 349 starts (2001 – 2009, 2012 – 2020); 327th entry at the 2020 Portuguese GP
