= Ian Jacobs =

- Born: Ian Jacobs
- Nickname: Powerhouse
- Nationality: Australian
- Division: Middleweight; Light Heavyweight
- Style: Kickboxing

Kickboxing record
- Total: 34
- Wins: 27
- By knockout: 17
- Losses: 3
- Draws: 4

Ian "Powerhouse" Jacobs is an Australian kickboxer and former 3 time World Kickboxing Champion.

He has had victories over other former World Champions, such as Gurkan Ozkan by Unanimous points decision, and 'Diamond' Dale Westerman by Knockout.

Ian Jacobs made a comeback to Kickboxing in November 2009, at Tarik Solak's A-1 8 man eliminator tournament. In his 1st match, Ian set a new world record for the fastest KO in kickboxing history, breaking a record held for 17 years by Stan Longinidis, as Ian Jacobs knocked out The Headhunter in 6 seconds. However, Ian Jacobs then lost to Baris Nezif in the Semi-final via Knockout. Ian's only other 2 losses came from earlier in his career against Manson Gibson and Alex Tui.

== Titles and accomplishments ==
- WKA World Middleweight Kickboxing Title
- WKA World Middleweight Muay Thai Title
- ISKA World Super Middleweight Muay Thai Title
- 2 x Commonwealth Super Middleweight Title
- Commonwealth Middleweight Title
- Australia Middleweight Title
- Australia Super Light Heavyweight Title
- Queensland Super Middleweight Title
- Queensland Light Heavyweight Title
- National hardest hitting champion in both light & heavy weight divisions
- Best ever kick Knock Out award
- Inducted into the Kickboxing Hall of fame
- Best fight ever seen on FOX Sports
- Three-time winner of the open "National Martial Arts League". Hardest punch, hardest kick and hardest punch/ kick combination. Winner of both lightweight and heavyweight divisions.
