= Guido Basile =

Italian politician (1893–1984)

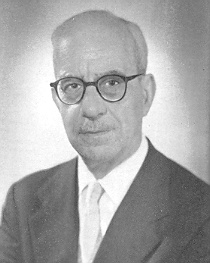
Guido Basile

Guido Basile (16 July 1893, Messina - 1 December 1984) was an Italian politician. He represented the Labour Democratic Party in the Constituent Assembly of Italy and the Italian Liberal Party in the Chamber of Deputies from 1953 to 1968.
