= Marcel Albers =

Dutch motor racing driver (1967–1992)

- Nationality: (Netherlands) Dutch
- Born: Marcel Adrianus Gerardus Albers; April 29, 1967
- Died: April 20, 1992 (aged 24)

Previous series
- 1991–92 1990 1989: British Formula Three Championship; EFDA Formula Opel Lotus Euroseries; Formula Ford 1600 Netherlands

Championship titles
- 1989: Formula Ford 1600 Netherlands

Marcel Adrianus Gerardus Albers (April 29, 1967 – April 20, 1992) was a Dutch motor racing driver.

Having progressed through the ranks of the Dutch formulae, including a Formula Ford championship win in 1989, Albers moved to the Opel Euroseries for 1990, going on to finish a creditable sixth in the championship. A move to British Formula Three for 1991 followed and he again impressed, finishing fifth in the championship. He also finished third at the prestigious Marlboro Masters, finishing behind Scotsman David Coulthard and Spain's Jordi Gené. These performances had installed Albers to be one of the title favourites for the 1992 British championship. After a win in the opening round at Donington Park, Albers retired from the second round at Silverstone and then qualified on the front row for round three.

Albers was killed in April 1992 at Thruxton in Hampshire, during round 3 of the 1992 British Formula Three season. Having recovered from earlier gearbox troubles, he was running behind his team-mate Elton Julian on Woodham Hill, just before the braking area to the Club chicane, when he hit the back of Julian's car. His Ralt cartwheeled across the track, and smashed into the safety fencing, where he lay stricken in his car for an hour. Having been extracted from his car, he died on the way to the medical centre. He posthumously finished seventh in the race (which had been stopped after the accident) and 11th in the championship.

He was not related to fellow Dutch motor racing driver Christijan Albers, despite having the same surname.
