= 1989 Monaco Grand Prix Formula Three =

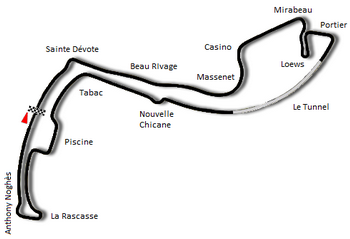
Circuit de Monaco (1986–1996)

Results from the 1989 Monaco Grand Prix Formula Three held at Monte Carlo on May 6, 1989, in the Circuit de Monaco.

== Classification ==
Pos	Driver	Constructor	Laps	Time/Retired
1	(Italy) Antonio Tamburini	Reynard 893-Alfa Romeo	24	39.52,930
2	(Italy) Andrea Montermini	Reynard 893-Alfa Romeo	24	39.53,949
3	(Sweden) Rickard Rydell	Reynard 893-Volkswagen	24	39.59,097
4	(Italy) Gianni Morbidelli	Dallara F389-Alfa Romeo	24	40.00,679
5	(France) Didier Artzet	Reynard 893-Toyota	24	40.00,980
6	(Switzerland) Alain Menu	Ralt RT33-Volkswagen	24	40.03,835
7	(Italy) Giovanni Bonanno	Dallara F389-Alfa Romeo	24	40.15,523
8	(Germany) Otto Rensing	Reynard 903-Mugen	24	40.20,386
9	(Australia) David Brabham	Ralt RT33-Volkswagen	24	40.21,101
10	(Germany) Daniel Müller	Reynard 893-Volkswagen	24	40.33,753
11	(Argentina) Gabriel Furlán	Dallara F389-Alfa Romeo	24	40.52,599
12	(France) Yvan Muller	Martini MK58-Volkswagen	24	40.56,247
13	(Belgium) Thierry Delubac	Reynard 893-Alfa Romeo	24	41.01,206
14	(Italy) Amato Ferrari	Dallara F389-Volkswagen	24	41.05,626
15	(Monaco) Olivier Beretta	Dallara F389-Alfa Romeo	24	41.13,122
16	(Finland) Mika Häkkinen	Reynard 893-Toyota	24	41.16,210
17	(United Kingdom) Paul Stewart	Reynard 893-Mugen	24	41.19,100
18	(United Kingdom) Paul Warwick	Reynard 893-Toyota	23	40.36,267
19	(France) Jean-Marc Gounon	Reynard 893-Alfa Romeo	21	35.14,507
DNF	(Germany) Ellen Lohr	BSR 389-Volkswagen	17	29.12,713
DNF	(France) Laurent Daumet	Dallara F389-Volkswagen	15	25.32,247
DNF	(Mexico) Giovanni Aloi	Dallara F389-Alfa Romeo	14	24.13,182
DNF	(Germany) Michael Bartels	Reynard 893-Volkswagen	14	24.43,079
DNF	(Italy) Alessandro Zanardi	Ralt RT33-Toyota	9	15.27,360
DNF	(Germany) Frank Schmickler	Reynard 893-Volkswagen	7	12.26,736
DNF	(Italy) Eugenio Visco	Dallara F389-Alfa Romeo	3	05.26,635
