= Forti racing record =

Results achieved by the Forti auto racing team

This is a table of championship and notable race results achieved by the Forti auto racing team.

Year	Championship	Car(s)	Driver(s)	Races	Wins	Poles	Fastest laps	Points	DC/WDC/Race	TC/WCC
1977	Italian Formula Ford 2000	?-Ford	(Italy) Teo Fabi	?	?	?	?	?	1st	?
1978	European Formula Three	March-Toyota	(Italy) Teo Fabi†	14	3	2	3	45	4th	?
1978	Italian Formula Three	March-Toyota	(Italy) Teo Fabi†	8?	4?	0	2?	36	4th	?
1978	Grand Prix de Monaco F3	March-Toyota	(Italy) Piero Necchi†	1	0	0	0	N/A	DNA	N/A
1978	Grand Prix de Monaco F3	March-Toyota	(Italy) Teo Fabi†	1	0	0	0	N/A	NC	N/A
1979	European Formula Three	March-Toyota	(Italy) Alfredo Ruggeri†	1	0	0	0	0	NC	?
1979	European Formula Three	March-Toyota	(Italy) Piero Necchi†	2	0	0	0	0^{p}	NC^{p}	?
1979	Argentine Formula Three	Martini-Toyota	(Argentina) Oscar Larrauri	2	2	0	1	?	1st	?
1979	Grand Prix de Monaco F3	Ralt-Toyota	(Italy) Alfredo Ruggeri†	1	0	0	0	N/A	DNQ	N/A
1980	European Formula Three	Martini-Toyota	(Argentina) Oscar Larrauri‡	14	0	0	0	7	11th	?
1980	European Formula Three	Martini-Toyota	(Italy) Daniele Albertin†	8	0	0	0	0	NC	?
1980	European Formula Three	Martini-Toyota	(Italy) Piero Necchi¶	1	0	0	0	0	NC	?
1980	European Formula Three	Martini-Toyota	(Italy) Enzo Coloni	1	0	0	0	0	9th*	?
1981	European Formula Three	Martini-Toyota	(Italy) Vinicio Salmi	2	0	0	0	0	NC	?
1981	Italian Formula Three	Martini-Fiat/Toyota	(Italy) Vinicio Salmi	12	0	0	0	4	=15th	?
1982	European Formula Three	Martini-Alfa Romeo	(Switzerland) Franco Forini	4	0	0	0	3	16th	?
1983	Italian Formula Three	Martini-Alfa Romeo	(Italy) Nicola Carboni	?	?	?	?	1	19th	?
1984	?									
1985	Italian Formula Three	Dallara-VW	(Switzerland) Franco Forini	13	5	5	2	70	1st	?
1985	European Formula Three Cup	Dallara-VW	(Switzerland) Franco Forini	1	0	0	0	N/A	11th	N/A
1985	European Formula Three Cup	Dallara-VW	(Spain) Adrián Campos	1	0	0	0	N/A	8th	N/A
1985	Macau Grand Prix	Dallara-VW	(Switzerland) Franco Forini	1	0	0	?	N/A	NC	N/A
1985	Macau Grand Prix	Dallara-VW	(Spain) Adrián Campos	1	0	0	?	N/A	NC	N/A
1986	Italian Formula Three	Dallara-VW; Dallara-Alfa Romeo	(Italy) Giorgio Montaldo	?	?	?	?	?	?	?
1986	Italian Formula Three	Dallara-VW; Dallara-Alfa Romeo	(Italy) Fabrizio Rossi	?	?	?	?	?	?	?
1986	Italian Formula Three	Dallara-VW; Dallara-Alfa Romeo	(Italy) Nicola Marozzo	?	?	?	?	?	?	?
1986	Italian Formula Three	Dallara-VW; Dallara-Alfa Romeo	(Italy) Giovanna Amati	?	?	?	?	?	?	?
1986	European Formula Three Cup	Dallara-VW	(Switzerland) Urs Dudler	1	0	0	?	N/A	NC	N/A
1986	Macau Grand Prix	Dallara-VW	(Switzerland) Franco Forini	1	0	0	?	N/A	7th	N/A
1987	International Formula 3000	Dallara-Cosworth	(Italy) Nicola Larini	4	0	0	0	0	NC	NC
1987	International Formula 3000	Dallara-Cosworth	(Italy) Nicola Tesini	1	0	0	0	0	NC	NC
1987	Italian Formula Three	Dallara-Alfa Romeo	(Italy) Enrico Bertaggia	?	?	?	?	55	1st	?
1987	Italian Formula Three	Dallara-Alfa Romeo	(Italy) Emanuele Naspetti	?	?	?	?	2	17th	?
1987	Macau Grand Prix	Dallara-Alfa Romeo	(Italy) Enrico Bertaggia	1	0	0	0	N/A	6th	N/A
1987	Macau Grand Prix	Dallara-Alfa Romeo	(Italy) Mauro Martini	1	0	0	0	N/A	NC	N/A
1987	Grand Prix de Monaco F3	Dallara-Alfa Romeo	(Italy) Nicola Larini	1	1	0	0	N/A	4th	N/A
1987	Grand Prix de Monaco F3	Dallara-Alfa Romeo	(Italy) Enrico Bertaggia	1	0	0	0	N/A	NC	N/A
1988	International Formula 3000	Dallara-Cosworth; Lola-Cosworth	(Italy) Enrico Bertaggia	11	0	0	0	0	NC	NC
1988	International Formula 3000	Dallara-Cosworth; Lola-Cosworth	(Argentina) Fernando Croceri	5	0	0	0	0	NC	NC
1988	International Formula 3000	Dallara-Cosworth; Lola-Cosworth	(Italy) Enrico Debenedetti	2	0	0	0	0	NC	NC
1988	International Formula 3000	Dallara-Cosworth; Lola-Cosworth	(Italy) Nino Fama	1	0	0	0	0	NC	NC
1988	Italian Formula Three	Dallara-Alfa Romeo	(Italy) Emanuele Naspetti	?	?	?	?	48	1st	?
1988	Italian Formula Three	Dallara-Alfa Romeo	(Italy) Gianni Morbidelli	?	1	?	?	25	5th	?
1988	European Formula Three Cup	Dallara-Alfa Romeo	(Italy) Emanuele Naspetti	1	0	0	0	N/A	3rd	N/A
1988	European Formula Three Cup	Dallara-Alfa Romeo	(Italy) Gianni Morbidelli	1	0	1	0	N/A	9th	N/A
1988	Macau Grand Prix	Dallara-Alfa Romeo	(Italy) Enrico Bertaggia	1	1	0	0	N/A	1st	N/A
1988	Macau Grand Prix	Dallara-Alfa Romeo	(Italy) Gianni Morbidelli	1	0	0	0	N/A	7th	N/A
1988	Grand Prix de Monaco F3	Dallara-Alfa Romeo	(Italy) Enrico Bertaggia	1	1	0	0	N/A	1st	N/A
1988	Grand Prix de Monaco F3	Dallara-Alfa Romeo	(Italy) Gianni Morbidelli	1	0	0	0	N/A	12th	N/A
1989	International Formula 3000	Lola-Cosworth	(Italy) Claudio Langes	10	0	0	0	7	12th	9th
1989	Italian Formula Three	Dallara-Alfa Romeo	(Italy) Gianni Morbidelli	11	6	4	?	59	1st	?
1989	Italian Formula Three	Dallara-Alfa Romeo	(Italy) Fabiano Vandone	10	0	1	?	7	11th	?
1989	Italian Formula Three	Dallara-Alfa Romeo	(Italy) Vittorio Zoboli	9	0	0	?	2	16th	?
1989	European Formula Three Cup	Dallara-Alfa Romeo	(Italy) Gianni Morbidelli	1	1	0	1	N/A	1st	N/A
1989	European Formula Three Cup	Dallara-Alfa Romeo	(Italy) Fabiano Vandone	1	0	0	0	N/A	NC	N/A
1989	Macau Grand Prix	Dallara-Alfa Romeo	(Italy) Domenico Schiattarella	1	0	0	?	N/A	5th	N/A
1989	Macau Grand Prix	Dallara-Alfa Romeo	(Italy) Gianni Morbidelli	1	0	0	?	N/A	NC	N/A
1989	Grand Prix de Monaco F3	Dallara-Alfa Romeo	(Italy) Gianni Morbidelli	1	0	0	?	N/A	4th	N/A
1990	International Formula 3000	Lola-Cosworth	(Italy) Gianni Morbidelli	11	1	1	0	20	5th	7th
1990	Italian Formula Three	Dallara-Alfa Romeo	(Italy) Domenico Schiattarella	12	0	1	?	14	9th	?
1990	Italian Formula Three	Dallara-Alfa Romeo	(Italy) Fabiano Vandone	10	0	0	?	13	11th	?
1990	Italian Formula Three	Dallara-Alfa Romeo	(Italy) Alessandro Zampedri	11	0	0	?	4	17th	?
1990	Italian Formula Three	Dallara-Alfa Romeo	(Italy) Michele Minutolo	1	0	0	?	1	21st	?
1990	European Formula Three Cup	Dallara-Alfa Romeo	(Italy) Fabiano Vandone	1	0	0	?	N/A	5th	N/A
1990	European Formula Three Cup	Dallara-Alfa Romeo	(Italy) Domenico Schiattarella	1	0	0	?	N/A	NC	N/A
1990	Grand Prix de Monaco F3	Dallara-Alfa Romeo	(Italy) Alessandro Zampedri	1	0	0	?	N/A	10th	N/A
1990	Grand Prix de Monaco F3	Dallara-Alfa Romeo	(Italy) Fabiano Vandone	1	0	0	?	N/A	13th	N/A
1991	International Formula 3000	Lola-Cosworth; Reynard-Cosworth	(Italy) Emanuele Naspetti	10	4	1	2	37	3rd	3rd
1991	International Formula 3000	Lola-Cosworth; Reynard-Cosworth	(Italy) Fabrizio Giovanardi	10	0	0	0	6	13th	3rd
1991	Italian Formula Three	Dallara-Alfa Romeo	(Italy) Fabrizio de Simone	12	0	1	?	9	12th	?
1991	Italian Formula Three	Dallara-Alfa Romeo	(Italy) Alessandro Prioglio	11	0	0	?	5	=13th	?
1991	Italian Formula Three	Dallara-Alfa Romeo	(Italy) Paolo de Cristofaro	1	0	0	?	0	NC	?
1991	Italian Formula Three	Dallara-Alfa Romeo	(Italy) Richard Favero	10	0	0	?	0	NC	?
1991	Italian Formula Three	Dallara-Alfa Romeo	(Italy) Gianluca Paglicci	11	0	0	?	0	NC	?
1991	Grand Prix de Monaco F3	Dallara-Alfa Romeo	(Brazil) Antonio Stefani	1	0	0	?	N/A	12th	N/A
1991	Grand Prix de Monaco F3	Dallara-Alfa Romeo	(Italy) Fabrizio de Simone	1	0	0	?	N/A	NC	N/A
1992	International Formula 3000	Reynard-Cosworth	(Italy) Emanuele Naspetti	6	1	1	2	19	7th	2nd
1992	International Formula 3000	Reynard-Cosworth	(Italy) Andrea Montermini	4	2	1	2	23	2nd*	2nd
1992	International Formula 3000	Reynard-Cosworth	(Italy) Alessandro Zampedri	10	0	0	0	4	13th	2nd
1992	World Cup Formula 3000	Reynard-Cosworth	(Monaco) Olivier Beretta	1	0	0	0	N/A	3rd	N/A
1992	World Cup Formula 3000	Reynard-Cosworth	(Argentina) Gabriel Furlán	1	0	0	0	N/A	6th	N/A
1992	Italian Formula Three	Dallara-Alfa Romeo	(Italy) Fabrizio de Simone	11	0	0	?	5	16th	?
1992	Italian Formula Three	Dallara-Alfa Romeo	(Austria) Philipp Peter	1	0	0	?	0	NC	?
1992	Italian Formula Three	Dallara-Alfa Romeo	(Brazil) Antonio Stefani	7	0	0	?	0	NC	?
1992	Italian Formula Three	Dallara-Alfa Romeo	(Italy) Giorgio Tibaldo	1	0	0	?	0	NC	?
1993	International Formula 3000	Reynard-Cosworth	(Monaco) Olivier Beretta	9	1	1	0	20	6th	5th
1993	International Formula 3000	Reynard-Cosworth	(Brazil) Pedro Diniz	9	0	0	0	0	NC	5th
1994	International Formula 3000	Reynard-Cosworth	(Brazil) Pedro Diniz	8	0	0	0	3	14th	7th
1994	International Formula 3000	Reynard-Cosworth	(Japan) Hideki Noda	8	0	0	0	6	10th	7th
1995	Formula One	Forti-Ford	(Brazil) Pedro Diniz	17	0	0	0	0	NC	NC
1995	Formula One	Forti-Ford	(Brazil) Roberto Moreno	17	0	0	0	0	NC	NC
1995	Formula One Indoor Trophy	Forti-Ford	(Italy) Giovanni Lavaggi	1	0	0	0	0	5th	N/A
1995	Formula One Indoor Trophy	Forti-Ford	(Italy) Andrea Montermini	1	0	0	0	0	4th	N/A
1995	Formula One Indoor Trophy	Forti-Ford	(Italy) Vittorio Zoboli	1	0	0	0	0	6th	N/A
1996	Formula One	Forti-Ford	(Italy) Luca Badoer	10	0	0	0	0	NC	NC
1996	Formula One	Forti-Ford	(Italy) Andrea Montermini	10	0	0	0	0	NC	NC

* - including points scored for other teams.
† - entered under the "Astra Racing Team" or similar banner.
‡ - entered under both the "Racing Team Astra Marlboro" and "Squadra Forti Corse" banners during the course of the season.
¶ - entered under the "Team Forti Astra" banner.
^{p} - not eligible for points.
