= Häkkinen–Schumacher rivalry =

Formula One racing rivalry

The Häkkinen–Schumacher rivalry or Schumacher–Häkkinen rivalry was a Formula 1 rivalry between Mika Häkkinen, a two-time Formula 1 World Drivers' Champion from Finland, and Michael Schumacher, a seven-time Formula 1 World Drivers' Champion from Germany. Widely regarded as two of the greatest Formula 1 drivers of all time, their rivalry primarily spanned from the late 90s to the early 2000s. Known for their intense competition and contrasting driving styles, their rivalry began at the 1990 Macau Grand Prix. Both Häkkinen and Schumacher entered Formula 1 in the 1991 season, with Häkkinen joining Lotus and Schumacher joining Jordan before later switching to Benetton. They were involved in some minor competitions from the 1992 to 1997 Formula 1 seasons. Schumacher became the first of the two to win a World Drivers' Championship, claiming the title in the 1994 Formula 1 season with his B194. He followed this up with a repeat title in 1995 in his B195, achieving back-to-back championships.

Their fierce rivalry in Formula 1 became even more prominent during the 1998 to 2001 seasons. Häkkinen, who joined McLaren in 1993, secured two consecutive world championship titles, in 1998 with his MP4/13 and in 1999 with his MP4/14. Schumacher was his closest rival that season. The competition between Häkkinen and Schumacher was briefly interrupted in the middle of the 1999 season when Schumacher had to miss six races due to a broken leg after an incident at the 1999 British Grand Prix. During the 2000 and 2001 seasons, after joining Ferrari back in 1996 to revive the team's fortunes, Michael Schumacher, driving the Ferrari F2000 and F2001, achieved a remarkable resurgence by securing his third and fourth World Championship titles, successfully overcoming Mika Häkkinen in the McLaren MP4-16 amid a highly competitive rivalry.

Before the 2001 Italian Grand Prix, Häkkinen announced he would take a break from F1 for the 2002 season for family reasons. In July 2002, Häkkinen changed his mind and decided to retire completely. His retirement ultimately marked the end of his rivalry with Schumacher, who continued to race until the end of the 2006 season winning three more championship titles on the trot starting from 2002, finished third in 2005, and wound up second in 2006. Schumacher would later make a return to Formula 1, competing for the German-based team Mercedes from the 2010 season through the 2012 season.

== History ==
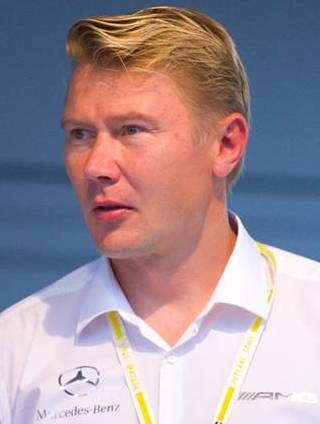
Mika Häkkinen, 1998–1999 World Drivers' Champion.

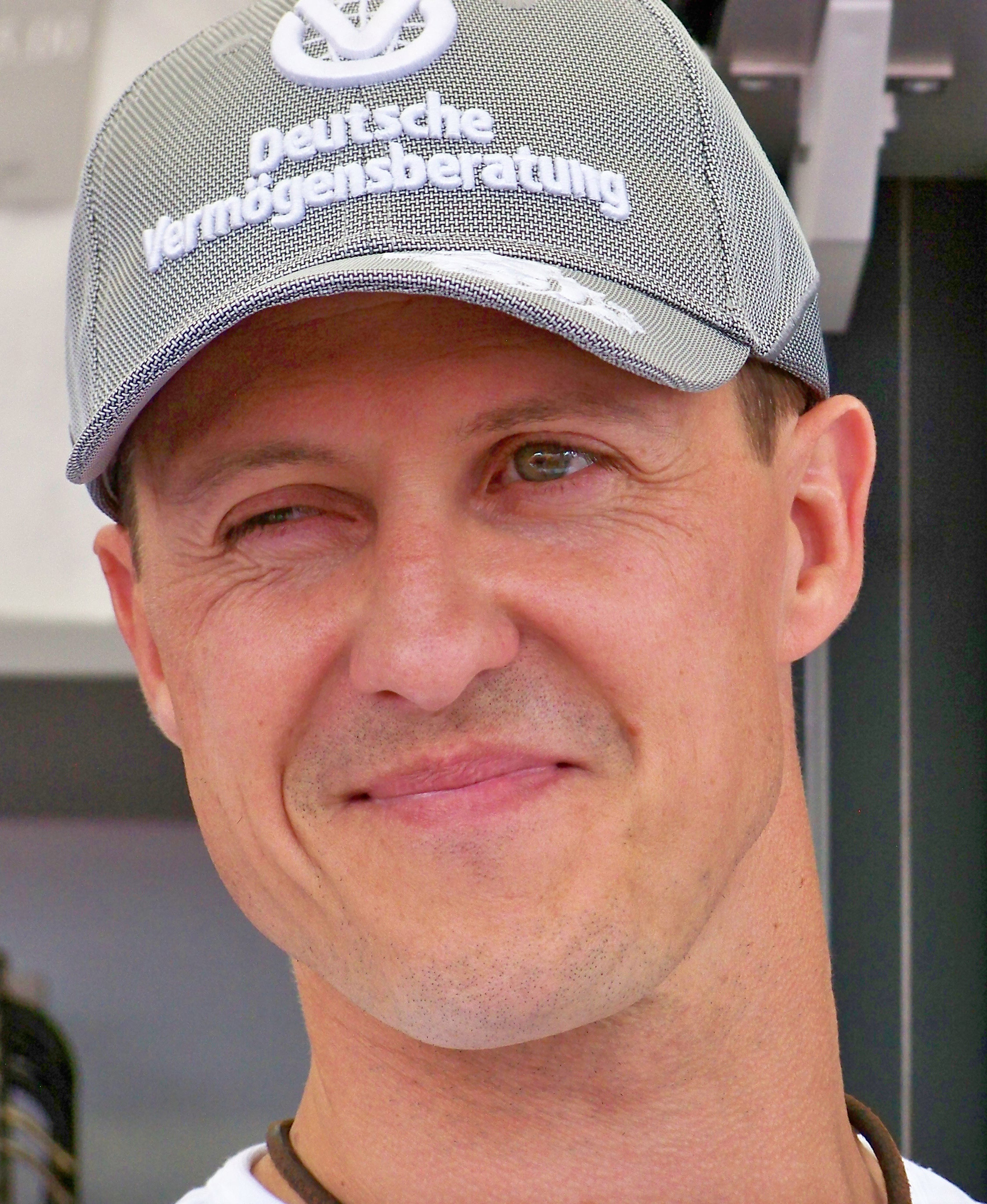
Michael Schumacher, 1994–1995 and 2000–2004 World Drivers' Champion.

=== Beginning ===
The beginning of the rivalry between Häkkinen and Schumacher can be traced back to their first meeting in the 1990 Macau Grand Prix. Before the race, Häkkinen was the British Formula Three champion with Theodore Racing, supported by West Surrey Racing, while Schumacher was the German Formula Three champion with WTS Racing. The Macau Grand Prix was the biggest and most prestigious race in Formula Three.

At that time, the Macau Grand Prix consisted of two sessions, each lasting 15 laps. The winner was determined by combining the total time from both races. Häkkinen won the first race, finishing 2.7 seconds ahead of Schumacher. Therefore, in the second race, he only needed to finish behind Schumacher with a time difference of no more than 2.7 seconds to win overall. In the second race, Häkkinen tried to play it safe by staying behind Schumacher, who was moving slowly towards the end of the race. Feeling that Schumacher's pace was too slow, Häkkinen then attempted to overtake him but failed, causing his car to collide with the back of Schumacher's car. Due to this incident, Häkkinen's car was damaged, and he could not finish the race, while Schumacher managed to continue and win the overall victory despite damage to the rear wing of his car. After the race, Schumacher apologized to Häkkinen for the incident and considered it a racing accident.

=== Early rivalry (1991–1997) ===
Häkkinen and Schumacher both made their Formula One debut in the 1991 season. The difference was that Häkkinen raced from the beginning of the season with Lotus, while Schumacher entered in the middle of the season with Jordan before switching to Benetton. In the 1991 and 1992 seasons, the two drivers did not have significant competition. Häkkinen struggled with the uncompetitive Lotus car, while Schumacher began building his reputation as a potential great driver by winning his first F1 race at the 1992 Belgian Grand Prix. Häkkinen became a test driver after receiving an offer from McLaren for the 1993 season. He got another chance to race in the last three races of the season, replacing Michael Andretti, whose contract was terminated.

In the 1994 season, Häkkinen returned full-time to F1 with McLaren. In the same season, Schumacher managed to win his first World Drivers' Championship title, which he successfully defended in the following year. During the 1994-1995 period, Häkkinen only managed to achieve 8 podium finishes. In the 1996 season, Schumacher moved to Ferrari. With a less competitive car, this time Schumacher's level was on par with Häkkinen, who was driving for McLaren. However, Schumacher still secured three victories in that season, followed by five more wins in the 1997 season. Häkkinen won his first F1 race at the 1997 European Grand Prix. In that race, Schumacher, who was competing for the title, was disqualified from the championship after attempting to block Jacques Villeneuve in an unsportsmanlike manner.

=== Peak of rivalry (1998–2001) ===
The 1998 season marked a significant turning point in the rivalry between Schumacher and Häkkinen. This time, McLaren had a competitive car that led Häkkinen to win eight races and secure the drivers' championship title. In that season, Schumacher also put on an impressive performance, winning six races and remaining a strong contender for the title until the final race of the season at the Japanese Grand Prix. In that race, Schumacher faced bad luck on the race day, even though he started from pole position. Technical issues with his car forced him to start from the back of the grid. Despite a promising start, Schumacher eventually had to retire from the race, which also confirmed Häkkinen's championship victory. After the race, Schumacher congratulated Häkkinen on his success.

In the 1999 season, Schumacher and Häkkinen once again emerged as favorites to compete for the championship title. They had a competitive battle in the early races of the season. However, Schumacher's chances of winning the title came to an abrupt end when he suffered an accident during the British Grand Prix, resulting in a broken leg and forcing him to miss six races. Ferrari's second driver, Eddie Irvine, became the team's main hope to replace Schumacher, with Mika Salo, who was recruited from the BAR team, also stepping in. Schumacher made a comeback towards the end of the season, specifically at the Malaysian Grand Prix. This time, he chose to support Irvine's bid for the championship. Unfortunately, their efforts were in vain, and Häkkinen once again became the world champion after winning the Japanese Grand Prix. Despite this, Schumacher's efforts in those two races helped Ferrari secure the Constructor's Championship title for the first time since the 1983 season.

In the 2000 season, both Schumacher and Häkkinen were determined to win their third world championship title. Schumacher started the season strongly, winning the first three races in Australia, Brazil, and San Marino. Meanwhile, Häkkinen had a rough start, failing to finish in the two races and only managing to get a second-place finish behind Schumacher in San Marino. Both Schumacher and Häkkinen then had to acknowledge David Coulthard's victory in the British Grand Prix. Häkkinen managed to secure a victory in Spain, which was later countered by Schumacher's win in the European Grand Prix. However, Schumacher's luck turned in Monaco when he suffered a DNF (Did Not Finish), and at the same time, Häkkinen struggled and could only manage a sixth-place finish. In Canada, Schumacher returned as the race winner, but he then faced a series of unfortunate events with three more DNFs in France, Austria, and Germany. Meanwhile, Häkkinen won the Austrian Grand Prix and turned the tables by leading the championship through an impressive victory in Hungary, where Schumacher, despite starting from pole position, only managed to finish second. The rivalry between the two drivers reached its climax in Belgium when Häkkinen secured a spectacular victory by overtaking Schumacher three laps before the finish. As the season approached its end, Schumacher's fortunes began to improve when he won the race in Italy, holding off Häkkinen's challenge. In the United States Grand Prix, Häkkinen faced misfortune as his car's engine caught fire, while Schumacher once again emerged as the race winner. The world championship title was finally decided at the Japanese Grand Prix. In this race, Häkkinen initially had the lead in the first half of the race before Schumacher turned the tables and won the race through a clever pit strategy devised by Ross Brawn. After the race, Häkkinen congratulated Schumacher on his success in becoming the champion of the 2000 season. Schumacher concluded the season with a victory in Malaysia, while Häkkinen could only manage a fourth-place finish after receiving a penalty for a jump start.

In the 2001 season, both Schumacher and Häkkinen were once again favored as championship contenders. This time, Häkkinen felt more relaxed, especially after recently becoming a father, and he did not have the pressure of being the defending champion. The start of the season had different outcomes for Schumacher and Häkkinen. Schumacher managed to win the first two races in Australia and Malaysia, while Häkkinen struggled with his McLaren car and failed to finish in Australia, with an incident where he lost control and hit the wall. Häkkinen's misfortune continued when his car suddenly stalled before the start of the race in Brazil. He only scored points again in San Marino, while Schumacher had already started building a lead at the top of the standings. In Spain, Häkkinen performed well and appeared to be on track to win the race until his clutch suddenly failed on the last lap, handing victory to Schumacher. After the race, Schumacher showed sympathy for Häkkinen regarding the incident that happened on the last lap. While Schumacher had a smooth 2001 season and eventually won his fourth World Drivers' Championship title after winning in Hungary, Häkkinen experienced one of his worst seasons. Häkkinen could only manage to win one race, which was in Britain. During the Italian Grand Prix, it was announced that Häkkinen would take a full-year sabbatical for the 2002 season, and his position at McLaren would be taken by the young Finnish driver, Kimi Räikkönen. Häkkinen later secured a victory in the United States, which turned out to be his last F1 race victory after he announced his full retirement from F1 in the mid of 2002. On the other hand, Schumacher remained a dominant force in F1, winning a remarkable seventh World Drivers' Championship title in the 2004 season.

== Relationship after retirement ==
After Häkkinen announced his retirement from F1 in mid-2001, Schumacher paid tribute to him by saying, "Häkkinen is the best opponent I have ever faced. We may have fought hard on the racetrack, but when the race was over, I was amazed by his disciplined personal side. We had great respect for each other and let each other live peacefully."

As a tribute to Schumacher's success in winning his fourth world championship title in the 2001 season, Häkkinen - who is a tortoise lover - presented him with a gift of a tortoise. Schumacher took care of the tortoise at his home in Switzerland, and to make identification easier, he placed his personal sponsor's logo, Deutsche Vermögensberatung, on the tortoise's shell. Schumacher considered Häkkinen's gift as "one of the greatest gestures he received from a former rival."

After Schumacher suffered a serious injury from a skiing accident at the end of 2013, Häkkinen once again showed his support for Schumacher and his family. He expressed optimism that Schumacher would recover just like before. Häkkinen himself had experienced a head injury during an accident at the 1995 Australian Grand Prix.

In the documentary film Schumacher released in 2021, Häkkinen reminisced about his rivalry with Schumacher, considering it one of the best experiences for both of them. He regarded Schumacher as a brave driver who occasionally pushed the limits beyond what was expected. Häkkinen acknowledged that it might have been difficult for them to be considered friends, but they respected and appreciated each other. Outside the racing arena, they had their own separate personal lives.

== Formula One World Championship ==
Driver	Years active	Entries	Start	Championship	Wins	Pole position	Fastest lap
(Finland) Mika Häkkinen	1991–2001	165	161	2	20	26	25
(Germany) Michael Schumacher	1991–2006; 2010–2012	308	306	7	91	68	77

=== Head-to-head results ===
Driver	Championship position											Wins	Podiums	Championships
Driver	1991	1992	1993	1994	1995	1996	1997	1998	1999	2000	2001	Wins	Podiums	Championships
(Finland) Mika Häkkinen	16th Lotus	8th Lotus	16th McLaren	4th McLaren	7th McLaren	5th McLaren	6th McLaren	1st McLaren	1st McLaren	2nd McLaren	5th McLaren	20	51	2
(Germany) Michael Schumacher	14th Jordan/ Benetton	3rd Benetton	4th Benetton	1st Benetton	1st Benetton	3rd Ferrari	DSQ; Ferrari	2nd Ferrari	5th Ferrari	1st Ferrari	1st Ferrari	53	97	4

== See also ==
- List of sports rivalries
- Formula One rivalries
- Schumacher (film)
