= 1989 Macau Grand Prix =

Formula Three motor race

Race details
| Date | 26 November 1989 |
| Location | Guia Circuit, Macau |
| Course | Temporary street circuit 6.120 km (3.803 mi) |
| Distance | Leg 1; 12 laps, 73.44 km (45.63 mi); Leg 2; 15 laps, 91.8 km (57.0 mi) |
- Leg 1

Pole
| Driver | (Germany) Otto Rensing |
| Time | 2:22.38 |

Fastest Lap
| Driver | (Austria) Karl Wendlinger |
| Time | 2:24.88 |

Podium
| First | (Germany) Michael Schumacher |
| Second | (Australia) David Brabham |
| Third | (United Kingdom) Julian Bailey |
- Leg 2

Pole
| Driver | (Germany) Michael Schumacher |

Fastest Lap
| Driver | (Australia) David Brabham |
| Time | 2:24.62 |

Podium
| First | (Australia) David Brabham |
| Second | (United Kingdom) Julian Bailey |
| Third | (France) Christophe Bouchut |
- Overall Results
| First | (Australia) David Brabham |
| Second | (United Kingdom) Julian Bailey |
| Third | (France) Christophe Bouchut |

The 1989 Macau Grand Prix Formula Three was the 36th Macau Grand Prix race to be held on the streets of Macau on 26 November 1989. It was the sixth edition for Formula Three cars.

== Entry list ==
| Team | No | Driver | Vehicle | Engine |
|---|---|---|---|---|
| (Italy) Watsons Water Forti Corse | 1 | (Italy) Gianni Morbidelli | Dallara 389 | Alfa Romeo |
| (Italy) Forti Corse | 38 | (Italy) Domenico Schiattarella | Dallara 389 | Mugen-Honda |
| (United Kingdom) Kawai Steel Bowman Racing | 2 | (Australia) David Brabham | Ralt RT33 | Volkswagen |
| (United Kingdom) Bowman Racing | 23 | (Australia) Gary Brabham | Ralt RT33 | Volkswagen |
| (United Kingdom) Hutchison Telecom Bowman Racing | 26 | (Republic of Ireland) Derek Higgins | Ralt RT33 | Volkswagen |
| (United Kingdom) Hutchison Telecom Bowman Racing | 27 | (United Kingdom) Steve Robertson | Ralt RT33 | Volkswagen |
| (Japan) Kawai Steel Le Garage Cox | 3 | (Japan) Akihiko Nakaya | Ralt RT33 | Mugen-Honda |
| (Japan) Le Garage Cox | 40 | (Japan) Naoki Hattori | Ralt RT33 | Mugen-Honda |
| (British Hong Kong) Marlboro Theodore Racing w/ West Surrey Racing | 5 | (United Kingdom) Allan McNish | Ralt RT33 | Mugen-Honda |
| (British Hong Kong) Marlboro Theodore Racing w/ West Surrey Racing | 6 | (United Kingdom) Eddie Irvine | Ralt RT33 | Mugen-Honda |
| (United Kingdom) Marlboro Theodore Racing w/ Dragon Motorsport | 7 | (Finland) Mika Häkkinen | Reynard 893 | Toyota |
| (United Kingdom) Federal Express Intersport Racing | 8 | (Italy) Alessandro Zanardi | Ralt RT33 | Toyota |
| (United Kingdom) Federal Express Intersport Racing | 9 | (France) Bertrand Gachot | Ralt RT33 | Toyota |
| (United Kingdom) Camel Stewart Team | 10 | (United Kingdom) Paul Stewart | Reynard 893 | Mugen-Honda |
| (United Kingdom) Camel Stewart Team | 11 | (Germany) Otto Rensing | Reynard 893 | Mugen-Honda |
| (Germany) Watsons Water Team Schübel | 12 | (Germany) Heinz-Harald Frentzen | Reynard 893 | Volkswagen |
| (Germany) Watsons Water Team Schübel | 15 | (United Kingdom) Julian Bailey | Reynard 893 | Volkswagen |
| (Republic of Ireland) Viceroy Eddie Jordan Racing | 16 | (Sweden) Rickard Rydell | Reynard 893 | Volkswagen |
| (United Kingdom) Leyton House Racing w/ West Surrey Racing | 17 | (Japan) Masahiko Kageyama | Ralt RT33 | Mugen-Honda |
| (France) Equipe ORECA | 18 | (France) Jean-Marc Gounon | Reynard 893 | Alfa Romeo |
| (France) Equipe ORECA | 19 | (France) Éric Hélary | Reynard 893 | Alfa Romeo |
| (France) KTR | 20 | (France) Laurent Daumet | Reynard 893 | Volkswagen |
| (France) KTR | 21 | (France) Christophe Bouchut | Reynard 893 | Volkswagen |
| (Japan) Footwork Formula | 22 | (Japan) Eiki Muramatsu | Ralt RT33 | Mugen-Honda |
| (Italy) Hutchison Telecom Prema Racing | 28 | (Italy) Antonio Tamburini | Reynard 893 | Alfa Romeo |
| (United Kingdom) Dawson Auto Developments | 29 | (Portugal) Antonio Simoes | Ralt RT33 | Alfa Romeo |
| (Austria) RSM Marko | 30 | (Austria) Karl Wendlinger | Ralt RT33 | Alfa Romeo |
| (Germany) Bongers Motorsport | 31 | (Germany) Michael Bartels | Reynard 893 | Volkswagen |
| (Germany) WTS Motorsport | 32 | (Germany) Michael Schumacher | Reynard 893 | Volkswagen |
| (Japan) Super Hakka Racing Works | 33 | (Japan) Kouji Sato | Ralt RT33 | Mugen-Honda |
| (Sweden) G-Son Motorsport | 35 | (Sweden) Jan Nilsson | Reynard 893 | Volkswagen |
| (Switzerland) Squadra Foitek | 36 | (Switzerland) Jacques Isler | Dallara 388 | Alfa Romeo |

== Classification ==
=== Race ===
| Pos. | No. | Driver | Team | Laps | Race Time |
|---|---|---|---|---|---|
| 1 | 2 | (Australia) David Brabham | Bowman Racing | 26 | 1:03:43.950 |
| 2 | 15 | (United Kingdom) Julian Bailey | Team Schübel | 26 | +12.120 |
| 3 | 21 | (France) Christophe Bouchut | KTR | 26 | +20.210 |
| 4 | 3 | (Japan) Akihiko Nakaya | Le Garage Cox Racing Team | 26 | +45.650 |
| 5 | 38 | (Italy) Domenico Schiattarella | Forti Corse | 26 | +1:02.550 |
| 6 | 23 | (Australia) Gary Brabham | Bowman Racing | 26 | +1:47.710 |
| 7 | 36 | (Switzerland) Jacques Isler | Squadra Foitek | 26 | +2:04.840 |
| 8 | 40 | (Japan) Naoki Hattori | Le Garage Cox Racing Team | 26 | +2:21.810 |
| 9 | 26 | (Republic of Ireland) Derek Higgins | Bowman Racing | 26 | +2:39.380 |
| 10 | 28 | (Italy) Antonio Tamburini | Prema Racing | 23 | +2:18.730 |
| DNF | 18 | (France) Jean-Marc Gounon | Equipe ORECA | 24 | - |
| DNF | 22 | (Japan) Eiki Muramatsu | Footwork Formula | 23 | - |
| DNF | 32 | (Germany) Michael Schumacher | WTS Motorsport | 20 | - |
| DNF | 1 | (Italy) Gianni Morbidelli | Forti Corse | 19 | - |
| DNF | 19 | (France) Éric Hélary | Equipe ORECA | 18 | - |
| DNF | 33 | (Japan) Kouji Sato | Super Hakka Racing Works | 18 | - |
| DNF | 10 | (United Kingdom) Paul Stewart | Stewart Team | 16 | - |
| DNF | 12 | (Germany) Heinz-Harald Frentzen | Team Schübel | 15 | - |
| DNF | 27 | (United Kingdom) Steve Robertson | Bowman Racing | 15 | - |
| DNF | 8 | (Italy) Alessandro Zanardi | Intersport Racing | 14 | - |
| DNF | 11 | (Germany) Otto Rensing | Stewart Team | 12 | - |
| DNF | 7 | (Finland) Mika Häkkinen | Dragon Motorsport w/ Marlboro Theodore Racing | 12 | - |
| DNF | 30 | (Austria) Karl Wendlinger | RSM Marko | 12 | - |
| DNF | 31 | (Germany) Michael Bartels | Bongers Motorsport | 12 | - |
| DNF | 9 | (France) Bertrand Gachot | Intersport Racing | 1 | - |
| DNF | 20 | (France) Laurent Daumet | KTR | - | - |
| DNF | 29 | (Portugal) Antonio Simoes | Dawson Auto Developments | - | - |
| DNS | 5 | (United Kingdom) Allan McNish | West Surrey Racing w/ Marlboro Theodore Racing | - | - |
| DNS | 6 | (United Kingdom) Eddie Irvine | West Surrey Racing w/ Marlboro Theodore Racing | - | - |
| DNS | 16 | (Sweden) Rickard Rydell | Eddie Jordan Racing | - | - |
| DNS | 35 | (Sweden) Jan Nilsson | G-Son Motorsport | - | - |
