= 1990 Monaco Grand Prix Formula Three =

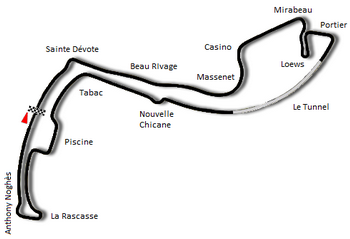
Circuit de Monaco (1986-1996)

Results from the 1990 Monaco Grand Prix Formula Three held at Monte Carlo on May 26, 1990, in the Circuit de Monaco.

== Classification ==
Pos	Driver	Constructor	Laps	Time/Retired
1	(France) Laurent Aïello	Dallara F390-Volkswagen	16	34.32,722
2	(Germany) Ellen Lohr	Ralt RT34-Volkswagen	16	34.54,439
3	(Monaco) Olivier Beretta	Dallara F390-Alfa Romeo	16	34.55,185
4	(France) Laurent Daumet	Dallara F390-Alfa Romeo	16	35.30,746
5	(France) Jérôme Policand	Dallara F390-Alfa Romeo	16	35.35,868
6	(Italy) Roberto Colciago	Reynard 903-Alfa Romeo	16	35.56,410
7	(France) Olivier Panis	Dallara F390-Alfa Romeo	16	35.56,871
8	(France) Olivier Thévenin	Dallara F390-Volkswagen	16	36.10,078
9	(France) Ludovic Faure	Dallara F390-Alfa Romeo	16	36.12,581
10	(Italy) Alessandro Zampedri	Dallara F390-Alfa Romeo	16	36.13,834
11	(Germany) Klaus Panchyrz	Reynard 903-Volkswagen	16	36.15,150
12	(France) Christophe Bouchut	Reynard 903-Opel	16	36.29,392
13	(Italy) Fabiano Vandone	Dallara F390-Alfa Romeo	16	36.30,541
14	(Germany) Jo Zeller	Ralt RT34-Alfa Romeo	16	36.40,289
15	(Germany) Peter Zakowski	Reynard 903-Volkswagen	16	36.41,856
16	(Argentina) Gabriel Furlán	Dallara F390-Alfa Romeo	14	31.45,434
DNF	(Germany) Jörg Müller	Reynard 903-Volkswagen	9	21.09,864
DNF	(Germany) Otto Rensing	Ralt RT34-Volkswagen	8	17.30,644
DNF	(Italy) Walter Voulaz	Dallara F390-Alfa Romeo	8	18.16,666
DNF	(Italy) Alessandro Zanardi	Dallara F390-Alfa Romeo	3	07.07,342
DNF	(Italy) Richard Favero	Dallara F390-Alfa Romeo	3	07.14,258
DNF	(Germany) Wolfgang Kaufmann	Reynard 903-Opel	3	07.17,312
DNF	(Italy) Andrea Gilardi	Reynard 903-Alfa Romeo	3	07.20,254
DNF	(Italy) Max Angelelli	Dallara F390-Alfa Romeo	2	05.09,266
DNF	(France) Éric Hélary	Reynard 903-Mugen	1	02.25,438
