= 1990 Macau Grand Prix =

Formula Three motor race

Race details
Date	25 November 1990
Location	Guia Circuit, Macau
Course	Temporary street circuit 6.120 km (3.803 mi)
Distance	Leg 1; 15 laps, 91.8 km (57.0 mi); Leg 2; 15 laps, 91.8 km (57.0 mi)
- Leg 1

Pole
Driver	(Finland) Mika Häkkinen	Theodore Racing
Time	2:20.88

Fastest Lap
Driver	(Germany) Michael Schumacher	WTS Racing
Time	2:21.19

Podium
First	(Finland) Mika Häkkinen	Theodore Racing
Second	(Germany) Michael Schumacher	WTS Racing
Third	(Finland) Mika Salo	Alan Docking Racing
- Leg 2

Pole
Driver	(Finland) Mika Häkkinen	Theodore Racing

Fastest Lap
Driver	(Finland) Mika Häkkinen	Theodore Racing
Time	2:20.81

Podium
First	(Germany) Michael Schumacher	WTS Racing
Second	(Finland) Mika Salo	Alan Docking Racing
Third	(France) Laurent Aïello	Racing for Europe
- Overall Results
First	(Germany) Michael Schumacher	
Second	(Finland) Mika Salo	
Third	(United Kingdom) Eddie Irvine	

The 1990 Macau Grand Prix Formula Three was the 37th Macau Grand Prix race to be held on the streets of Macau on 25 November 1990. It was the seventh edition for Formula Three cars. Michael Schumacher won after Mika Hakkinen had tried to overtake but Schumacher deliberately blocked the move and Hakkinen crashed from behind. This started a rivalry between the two that would last until Mika's retirement in 2001.

== Entry list ==
Team	No	Driver	Vehicle	Engine
(British Hong Kong) Marlboro Team Theodore w/ West Surrey Racing	1	(United Kingdom) Eddie Irvine	Ralt RT34	Mugen-Honda
(British Hong Kong) Marlboro Team Theodore w/ West Surrey Racing	2	(Finland) Mika Häkkinen	Ralt RT34	Mugen-Honda
(Germany) Kawai Steel WTS Racing	3	(Germany) Michael Schumacher	Reynard 903	Volkswagen
(Japan) Kawai Steel Le Garage Cox	5	(Japan) Naoki Hattori	Ralt RT34	Mugen-Honda
(Italy) Prema Racing	6	(Italy) Roberto Colciago	Reynard 903	Alfa Romeo
(Italy) Prema Racing	11	(Italy) Giuseppe Bugatti	Reynard 903	Alfa Romeo
(France) Formula Project Racing	7	(France) Éric Hélary	Reynard 903	Mugen-Honda
(Italy) Bossini Racing Team w/ Volkswagen	8	(Sweden) Rickard Rydell	Ralt RT34	Volkswagen
(Italy) Bossini Racing Team w/ Volkswagen	9	(Germany) Otto Rensing	Ralt RT34	Volkswagen
(Italy) RC Motorsport	10	(Italy) Alessandro Zanardi	Dallara 390	Alfa Romeo
(Japan) Endless Project	12	(Japan) Keiichi Tsuchiya	Ralt RT34	Toyota
(Germany) Aluett Zakowski F3 Team	13	(Germany) Peter Zakowski	Reynard 903	Mugen-Honda
(United Kingdom) Camel Alan Docking Racing	15	(Finland) Mika Salo	Ralt RT34	Mugen-Honda
(United Kingdom) Camel Alan Docking Racing	16	(Germany) Heinz-Harald Frentzen	Ralt RT34	Mugen-Honda
(Italy) Venturini Racing	17	(Italy) Massimiliano Angelelli	Dallara 390	Alfa Romeo
(United Kingdom) Bowman Racing	18	(United Kingdom) Steve Robertson	Ralt RT33	Volkswagen
(France) Racing For Europe w/ Bowman Racing	19	(Belgium) Philippe Adams	Ralt RT33	Volkswagen
(France) Racing For Europe w/ Bowman Racing	20	(France) Laurent Aïello	Ralt RT33	Volkswagen
(France) Racing For Europe w/ Bowman Racing	21	(Monaco) Olivier Beretta	Ralt RT33	Volkswagen
(United Kingdom) Superpower Engineering	23	(Portugal) Pedro Chaves	Ralt RT34	Mugen-Honda
(Japan) Sekisui Two U Home Racing Team	25	(Japan) Naohiro Furuya	Ralt RT34	Mugen-Honda
(France) Montagut - French Fashions	26	(France) Olivier Panis	Reynard 903	Volkswagen
(Italy) Supercars	27	(Italy) Mirko Savoldi	Dallara 390	Alfa Romeo
(Germany) Monninghoff Int. Sport Promotion	28	(Germany) Klaus Panchyrz	Reynard 903	Volkswagen
(France) Jacky Carmignon Racing	29	(France) Jérôme Policand	Dallara 390	Alfa Romeo
(Switzerland) Jo Zeller Racing	30	(Switzerland) Jo Zeller	Ralt RT34	Alfa Romeo
(Switzerland) Jacques Isler Racing	31	(Switzerland) Jacques Isler	Dallara 390	Alfa Romeo
(Sweden) G-Son Racing	32	(Sweden) Fredrik Ekblom	Reynard 903	Volkswagen
(Japan) Capcom Racing	36	(Japan) Hisashi Wada	Ralt RT34	Mugen-Honda
(United Kingdom) Earl's Performance Products	38	(United Kingdom) Chris Smith	Ralt RT34	Mugen-Honda

== Race Results ==
Pos	Driver	Team	Laps
1	(Germany) Michael Schumacher	(Germany) WTS Racing	30
2	(Finland) Mika Salo	(United Kingdom) Alan Docking Racing	30
3	(United Kingdom) Eddie Irvine	(Hong Kong) Marlboro Team Theodore	30
4	(France) Laurent Aïello	(France) Racing for Europe	30
5	(Sweden) Rickard Rydell	(Italy) Bossini Racing Team w/ Volkswagen	30
6	(United Kingdom) Steve Robertson	(United Kingdom) Bowman Racing	30
7	(Italy) Alex Zanardi	(Italy) RC Motorsport	30
8	(Japan) Naoki Hattori	(Japan) Le Garage Cox	30
9	(Japan) Hisashi Wada	(Japan) Capcom Racing	30
10	(Switzerland) Jacques Isler	(Switzerland) Jacques Isler Racing	30
11	(Sweden) Fredrik Ekblom	(Sweden) G-Son Racing	30
12	(France) Olivier Panis	(France) Montagut Racing	30
13	(Germany) Klaus Panchyrz	(Germany) Mönninghoff Int. Sport Promotion	30
Ret	(Finland) Mika Häkkinen	(Hong Kong) Marlboro Team Theodore	29
Ret	(Portugal) Pedro Chaves	(United Kingdom) Superpower Engineering	27
Ret	(Switzerland) Jo Zeller	(Switzerland) Jo Zeller Racing	26
Ret	(Germany) Peter Zakowski	(Germany) Aluett Zakowski F3 Team	26
Ret	(Germany) Heinz-Harald Frentzen	(United Kingdom) Alan Docking Racing	24
Ret	(Italy) Roberto Colciago	(United Kingdom) Alan Docking Racing	23
Ret	(Monaco) Olivier Beretta	(France) Racing for Europe	23
Ret	(Japan) Keiichi Tsuchiya	(Japan) Endless Project	22
Ret	(France) Jérôme Policand	(France) Jacky Carmignon Racing	17
Ret	(France) Éric Hélary	(France) Formula Project Racing	15
Ret	(Japan) Naohiro Furuya	(Japan) Sekisui Two Home Racing Team	15
Ret	(Italy) Max Angelelli	(Italy) Venturini Racing	15
Ret	(Italy) Giuseppe Bugatti	(Italy) Prema Racing	13
Ret	(Germany) Otto Rensing	(Italy) Bossini Racing Team w/ Volkswagen	13
Ret	(Italy) Mirko Savoldi	(Italy) Supercars CM	11
Ret	(Belgium) Philippe Adams	(France) Racing for Europe	6
Ret	(United Kingdom) Chris Smith	(United Kingdom) Earl's Performance Products	1
