= Delubac =

Delubac or De Lubac is a French surname. Notable people with the surname include:

== Delubac ==
- Jacqueline Delubac (1907–1997), French actress
- Thierry Delubac (born 1963), French racing driver

== de Lubac ==
- Henri de Lubac (1896–1991), French Jesuit priest and cardinal
