= 1993 Formula One Indoor Trophy =

Motor race in Bologna

The 1993 Formula One Indoor Trophy took place on December 4–5 at the Bologna Motor Show. The winner was Rubens Barrichello in a Jordan-Hart.

== Participants ==
Driver	Team
(Italy) Michele Alboreto	BMS Lola-Ferrari
(Italy) Fabrizio Barbazza	BMS Lola-Ferrari
(Brazil) Rubens Barrichello	Jordan-Hart
(Italy) Pierluigi Martini	Minardi-Ford
(Italy) Vittorio Zoboli	Jordan-Hart

== Results ==
=== Preliminary rounds ===
Pos	Driver	Team	Points
1	(Brazil) Rubens Barrichello	Jordan-Hart	12
2	(Italy) Pierluigi Martini	Minardi-Ford	10
3	(Italy) Vittorio Zoboli	Jordan-Hart	8
4	(Italy) Michele Alboreto	BMS Lola-Ferrari	2
5	(Italy) Fabrizio Barbazza	BMS Lola-Ferrari	2

=== Knockout stage ===
Semi-finals
(Brazil) Rubens Barrichello	2
(Italy) Vittorio Zoboli	0
(Italy) Pierluigi Martini	2
(Italy) Michele Alboreto	0

Final
(Brazil) Rubens Barrichello	2
(Italy) Pierluigi Martini	1
Third place final
(Italy) Vittorio Zoboli	2
(Italy) Michele Alboreto	0
