= 1990 International Formula 3000 Championship =

Motor racing competition

1990 FIA International Formula 3000 Championship

Seasons
- ← 1989 1991 →

The 1990 International Formula 3000 Championship was a motor racing competition organised by the FIA for Formula 3000 cars. It was the sixth running of an FIA Formula 3000 Championship.

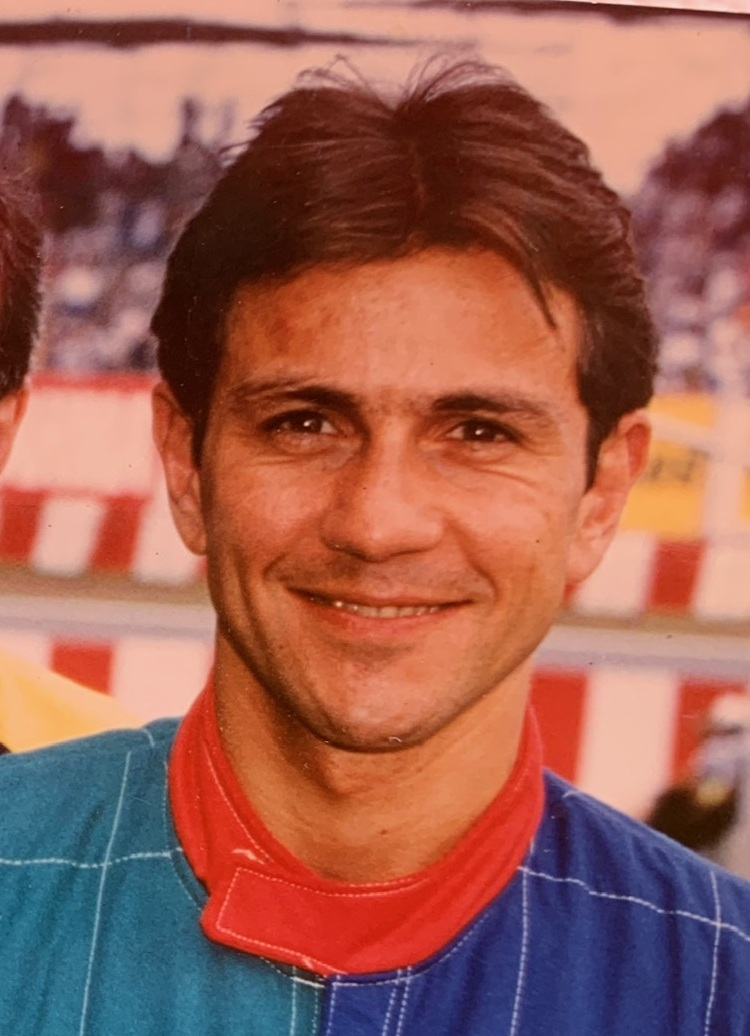
Érik Comas won the eleven-round championship driving for DAMS.

== Season summary ==
The season began on a damp Donington Park track. On the second lap, Allan McNish and Emanuele Naspetti collided on the straight before the Esses. McNish's car went over the concrete wall, and its engine broke away and killed a spectator. Meanwhile, the race continued uninterrupted and several drivers, including polesitter Andrea Montermini, spun off in the damp conditions. McNish's DAMS Lola teammate Érik Comas took the victory.

At the next round at Silverstone, Damon Hill overtook the two DAMS cars at the start, but suffered the same rear tire failure that had earlier claimed his teammate Gary Brabham. McNish took an emotional win just one week after his Donington crash.

The third round at Pau had to be restarted twice after accidents caused traffic jams on the narrow streets. Marco Apicella took a commanding lead, but slid off into a tire barrier, leaving Eric van de Poele to take the win. Érik Comas won the next round at Jerez, with Apicella coming second. Comas won at Monza as well, this time pursued by Eddie Irvine.

At Enna, a dusty track surface was exacerbated by the rubber “marbles” that resulted from the wearing tires. Many of the favorites spun out of the race, and Gianni Morbidelli won despite a spin of his own. Eddie Irvine managed to come in fourth with a broken front wing, having been off the track at least three times. Irvine won from Apicella at Hockenheim after polesitter Hill had spun off early.

Allan McNish won on a drying Brands Hatch track as the series returned to England. Van de Poele took his second win of the year at the Birmingham Superprix, a race in which Fabrizio Barbazza walked away from a spectacular accident. On the Bugatti Circuit at Le Mans, championship leader Comas led away. He was challenged by Philippe Gache, who put in a surprising drive in a year-old Lola before retiring. Comas won the race and clinched the title. Van de Poele won in the wet at Nogaro to take second in the championship. The final round, scheduled to be held at Dijon-Prenois was cancelled. An official statement cited the Gulf crisis and French talks on tobacco sponsorship as the reasons behind the cancellation.

== Teams and drivers ==
Team	Chassis	Engine	No.	Driver	Rounds
(United Kingdom) Eddie Jordan Racing	Reynard	Mugen Honda	1	(Italy) Emanuele Naspetti	1-3, 5-10
(United Kingdom) Eddie Jordan Racing	Reynard	Mugen Honda	1	(Italy) Vincenzo Sospiri	4, 11
(United Kingdom) Eddie Jordan Racing	Reynard	Mugen Honda	2	(United Kingdom) Eddie Irvine	All
(United Kingdom) Eddie Jordan Racing	Reynard	Mugen Honda	3	(Germany) Heinz-Harald Frentzen	All
(Italy) First Racing	Reynard	Mugen Honda	4	(Italy) Fabrizio Giovanardi	All
(Italy) First Racing	Reynard	Mugen Honda	5	(Italy) Marco Apicella	All
(Italy) First Racing	Reynard	Mugen Honda	6	(Switzerland) Jean-Denis Délétraz	1-5
(Italy) First Racing	Reynard	Mugen Honda	6	(Brazil) Marco Greco	10-11
(United Kingdom) GA Motorsport	Reynard	Ford Cosworth	8	(Belgium) Eric van de Poele	All
(United Kingdom) GA Motorsport	Reynard	Ford Cosworth	9	(Mexico) Giovanni Aloi	1-4
(United Kingdom) GA Motorsport	Reynard	Ford Cosworth	9	(Germany) Otto Rensing	5
(United Kingdom) GA Motorsport	Reynard	Ford Cosworth	9	(Brazil) Marco Greco	6-8
(United Kingdom) GA Motorsport	Reynard	Ford Cosworth	9	(Italy) Vittorio Zoboli	10-11
(United Kingdom) GA Motorsport	Reynard	Ford Cosworth	44	(France) Thierry Delubac	10-11
(United Kingdom) Paul Stewart Racing	Lola	Mugen Honda	10	(Canada) John Jones	All
(United Kingdom) Paul Stewart Racing	Lola	Mugen Honda	11	(Switzerland) Andrea Chiesa	All
(United Kingdom) Leyton House Racing	Leyton House	Ford Cosworth	12	(United Kingdom) Andrew Gilbert-Scott	1-7
(United Kingdom) Leyton House Racing	Leyton House	Ford Cosworth	12	(United Kingdom) Paul Warwick	8-11
(United Kingdom) Leyton House Racing	Leyton House	Ford Cosworth	13	(Switzerland) Philippe Favre	8-11
(France) Galaxy Racing	Lola	Ford Cosworth	14	(France) Thierry Delubac	1-5
(France) Galaxy Racing	Lola	Ford Cosworth	15	(France) Franck Fréon	1-5
(France) Galaxy Racing	Lola	Ford Cosworth	15	(France) Philippe Gache	10-11
(United Kingdom) Madgwick International	Reynard	Mugen Honda	16	(Italy) Andrea Montermini	All
(United Kingdom) Madgwick International	Reynard	Mugen Honda	17	(France) Jean-Marc Gounon	All
(United Kingdom) Madgwick International	Reynard	Ford Cosworth	43	(Portugal) Pedro Chaves	8-11
(United Kingdom) CoBRa Motorsports	Reynard	Mugen Honda	18	(Germany) Michael Bartels	All
(United Kingdom) CoBRa Motorsports	Reynard	Mugen Honda	19	(United Kingdom) Richard Dean	1-5
(United Kingdom) CoBRa Motorsports	Reynard	Mugen Honda	19	(Italy) Giovanna Amati	6-10
(United Kingdom) CoBRa Motorsports	Reynard	Mugen Honda	19	(Switzerland) Alain Menu	11
(United Kingdom) Pacific Racing	Lola	Mugen Honda	24	(Canada) Stéphane Proulx	All
(United Kingdom) Pacific Racing	Lola	Mugen Honda	25	(Brazil) Marco Greco	1-2
(United Kingdom) Pacific Racing	Lola	Mugen Honda	25	(Canada) Claude Bourbonnais	10-11
(France) DAMS	Lola	Mugen Honda	26	(France) Érik Comas	All
(France) DAMS	Lola	Mugen Honda	33	(United Kingdom) Allan McNish	All
(United Kingdom) Middlebridge Racing	Lola	Ford Cosworth	27	(Australia) Gary Brabham	2-11
(United Kingdom) Middlebridge Racing	Lola	Ford Cosworth	28	(United Kingdom) Damon Hill	All
(United Kingdom) Roni Motorsport	Reynard	Ford Cosworth	31	(Italy) Antonio Tamburini	All
(United Kingdom) Roni Motorsport	Reynard	Ford Cosworth	32	(Italy) Giovanna Amati	1-5
(United Kingdom) Becsport	Lola	Mugen Honda	32	(Italy) Paolo Delle Piane	6-11
(United Kingdom) Becsport	Lola	Mugen Honda	34	(Italy) Giovanni Bonanno	1-4
(United Kingdom) Becsport	Lola	Mugen Honda	34	(Italy) Domenico Gitto	6-7
(United Kingdom) Superpower	Reynard	Mugen Honda	35	(United Kingdom) Phil Andrews	All
(United Kingdom) Superpower	Reynard	Mugen Honda	36	(France) Paul Belmondo	All
(Italy) Crypton Engineering	Leyton House	Ford Cosworth	37	(Italy) Fabrizio Barbazza	All
(Austria) RSM Marko	Lola	Ford Cosworth	39	(Austria) Karl Wendlinger	1-2, 4–9, 11
(Austria) RSM Marko	Lola	Ford Cosworth	39	(Germany) Ellen Lohr	10
(France) Apomatox	Reynard	Ford Cosworth	40	(France) Philippe Gache	1-7
(France) Apomatox	Reynard	Ford Cosworth	40	(United Kingdom) Andrew Gilbert-Scott	8-11
(France) Apomatox	Reynard	Ford Cosworth	41	(France) Didier Artzet	1-7, 9
(France) Apomatox	Reynard	Ford Cosworth	41	(France) Franck Fréon	10-11
(Italy) Forti Corse	Lola	Ford Cosworth	42	(Italy) Gianni Morbidelli	All

== Calendar ==
Round	Race	Circuit	Date	Laps	Distance	Time	Speed	Pole position	Fastest lap	Winner
1	Donington 200 Gold Cup	(United Kingdom) Donington Park	22 April	50	4.023=201.150 km	1'12:15.34	167.03 km/h	(Italy) Andrea Montermini	(Canada) Stéphane Proulx	(France) Érik Comas
2	International Trophy	(United Kingdom) Silverstone Circuit	19 May	41	4.778=196.308 km	0'54:23.20	214.59 km/h	(United Kingdom) Allan McNish	(United Kingdom) Allan McNish	(United Kingdom) Allan McNish
3	Grand Prix de Pau	(France) Pau Grand Prix	4 June	69	2.76=190.44 km	1'24:18.72	135.532 km/h	(France) Érik Comas	(Italy) Marco Apicella	(Belgium) Eric van de Poele
4	Jerez F3000	(Spain) Circuito de Jerez	17 June	48	4.2179=202.459 km	1'18:07.02	155.49 km/h	(France) Érik Comas	(France) Érik Comas	(France) Érik Comas
5	Monza F3000	(Italy) Autodromo Nazionale Monza	24 June	34	5.8=197.2 km	0'55:19.12	213.75 km/h	(United Kingdom) Damon Hill	(United Kingdom) Damon Hill	(France) Érik Comas
6	Grand Premio del Mediterraneo	(Italy) Autodromo di Pergusa	22 July	36	4.95=178.200 km	0'55:27.219	192.80 km/h	(United Kingdom) Damon Hill	(United Kingdom) Damon Hill	(Italy) Gianni Morbidelli
7	Hockenheim F3000	(West Germany) Hockenheimring	28 July	29	6.797=197.113 km	0'58:14.604	202.95 km/h	(United Kingdom) Damon Hill	(Italy) Marco Apicella	(United Kingdom) Eddie Irvine
8	Brands Hatch F3000	(United Kingdom) Brands Hatch	19 August	48	4.1846=200.861 km	1'09:09.68	174.23 km/h	(United Kingdom) Eddie Irvine	(West Germany) Michael Bartels	(United Kingdom) Allan McNish
9	Halfords Birmingham Superprix	(United Kingdom) Birmingham	27 August	51	3.975=202.725 km	1'11:47.02	169.45 km/h	(Italy) Marco Apicella	(Italy) Marco Apicella	(Belgium) Eric van de Poele
10	Le Mans F3000	(France) Bugatti Circuit	23 September	45	4.426=199.170 km	1'11:41.65	166.85 km/h	(France) Érik Comas	(France) Philippe Gache	(France) Érik Comas
11	Grand Prix de Nogaro	(France) Circuit Paul Armagnac	7 October	55	3.625=199.375 km	1'20:27.81	148.670 km/h	(Italy) Gianni Morbidelli	(France) Érik Comas	(Belgium) Eric van de Poele
	Dijon F3000	(France) Dijon-Prenois	21 October	Cancelled						

== Final points standings ==
=== Driver ===
In each championship round, 9 points were awarded to the winning driver, 6 to the runner up, 4 for third place, 3 for fourth place, 2 for fifth place and 1 for sixth place. No additional points were awarded.

Pos	Driver	DON (United Kingdom)	SIL (United Kingdom)	PAU (France)	JER (Spain)	MNZ (Italy)	PER (Italy)	HOC (West Germany)	BRH (United Kingdom)	BIR (United Kingdom)	BUG (France)	NOG (France)	Points
1	(France) Érik Comas	1	2	Ret	1	1	Ret	4	Ret	Ret	1	2	51
2	(Belgium) Eric van de Poele	6	5	1	9	9	Ret	Ret	Ret	1	10	1	30
3	(United Kingdom) Eddie Irvine	Ret	6	Ret	DNS	2	4	1	3	Ret	3	Ret	27
4	(United Kingdom) Allan McNish	Ret	1	6†	16	6	2	Ret	1	Ret	Ret	8	26
5	(Italy) Gianni Morbidelli	8	Ret	3	Ret	4	1	Ret	Ret	Ret	7	3	20
6	(Italy) Marco Apicella	13	3	Ret	2	5	Ret	2	DSQ	Ret	Ret	5	20
7	(Switzerland) Andrea Chiesa	2	Ret	Ret	5	7	Ret	Ret	5	2	5	Ret	18
8	(Italy) Andrea Montermini	Ret	4	Ret	3	Ret	Ret	Ret	Ret	9	2	Ret	13
9	(France) Jean-Marc Gounon	Ret	13	DNQ	Ret	Ret	DSQ	3	6	4	4	Ret	11
10	(Italy) Fabrizio Giovanardi	Ret	Ret	2	6	10	6	7	Ret	5	Ret	Ret	10
11	(Australia) Gary Brabham		Ret	DNQ	12	3	3	14†	8	DNQ	8	11	8
12	(Canada) John Jones	3	11	4	Ret	Ret	Ret	DNQ	DNQ	11	9	DNQ	7
13	(United Kingdom) Damon Hill	DNQ	Ret	Ret	7	11	Ret	Ret	2	Ret	Ret	10	6
14	(Italy) Antonio Tamburini	4	9	Ret	13	8	8	DNQ	Ret	Ret	16	4	6
15	(France) Didier Artzet	DNQ	Ret	Ret	11	Ret	Ret	8		3			4
16	(Italy) Fabrizio Barbazza	Ret	Ret	Ret	4	Ret	Ret	9	Ret	Ret	Ret	18	3
17	(Portugal) Pedro Chaves								4	Ret	DNQ	14	3
18	(Germany) Heinz-Harald Frentzen	Ret	Ret	Ret	17	Ret	5	6	7	Ret	Ret	DNQ	3
19	(United Kingdom) Richard Dean	5	7	Ret	Ret	Ret							2
20	(France) Franck Fréon	DNQ	DNQ	5†	DNQ	DNQ					14	16	2
21	(Austria) Karl Wendlinger	DNQ	14		DNQ	Ret	Ret	5	DNQ	10		9	2
22	(Germany) Michael Bartels	11	Ret	Ret	Ret	Ret	7	Ret	11	Ret	13	6	1
23	(Italy) Emanuele Naspetti	Ret	10	Ret		Ret	Ret	Ret	Ret	6	DNQ		1
24	(France) Paul Belmondo	Ret	DNQ	DNQ	Ret	Ret	DNQ	11	Ret	Ret	6	Ret	1
25	(United Kingdom) Andrew Gilbert-Scott	Ret	12	DNQ	10	Ret	Ret	13	10	7	11	13	0
26	(Canada) Stéphane Proulx	12	Ret	Ret	Ret	Ret	Ret	10	Ret	Ret	Ret	7	0
27	(Switzerland) Jean-Denis Délétraz	7	DNQ	Ret	DNQ	Ret							0
28	(Italy) Giovanni Bonanno	10	8	DNQ	Ret				9	DNQ			0
29	(United Kingdom) Paul Warwick								Ret	8	DNS	15	0
30	(Italy) Vincenzo Sospiri				8							DNQ	0
31	(France) Philippe Gache	9	DNQ	Ret	14	Ret	Ret	Ret			Ret	Ret	0
32	(United Kingdom) Phil Andrews	14	Ret	DNQ	DNQ	DNQ	Ret	12	Ret	Ret	12	19	0
33	(Switzerland) Philippe Favre								12	DNS	15	DNQ	0
34	(Switzerland) Alain Menu											12	0
35	(Mexico) Giovanni Aloi	Ret	15	DNQ	15								0
36	(Italy) Giovanna Amati	Ret	DNQ	DNQ	DNQ	DNQ	DNQ	15	DNQ	DNQ	DNQ		0
37	(France) Thierry Delubac	DNQ	DNQ	DNQ	DNQ	DNQ					17	17	0
	(Italy) Paolo Delle Piane						DNQ	Ret	Ret	DNQ	DNQ	DNQ	
	(Italy) Domenico Gitto						Ret	Ret					
	(Brazil) Marco Greco	DNQ	DNQ				Ret	DNQ	DNQ		DNQ	DNQ	
	(Canada) Claude Bourbonnais										DNQ	DNQ	
	(Italy) Vittorio Zoboli										DNQ	DNQ	
	(Germany) Otto Rensing					DNQ							
	(Germany) Ellen Lohr										DNQ		

== Complete overview ==
first column of every race	10	= grid position

second column of every race	10	= race result

R6=retired, but classified R=retired NS=did not start NQ=did not qualify DIS(3)=disqualified after finishing in third position

Place	Name	Team	Chassis	Engine	DON (United Kingdom)		SIL (United Kingdom)		PAU (France)		JER (Spain)		MNZ (Italy)		PER (Italy)		HOC (West Germany)		BRH (United Kingdom)		BIR (United Kingdom)		BUG (France)		NOG (France)
1	(France) Érik Comas	DAMS	Lola	Mugen Honda	2	1	2	2	1	R	1	1	3	1	8	R	7	4	14	R	5	R	1	1	2	2
2	(Belgium) Eric van de Poele	GA Motorsports	Reynard	Ford Cosworth	4	6	17	5	5	1	3	9	14	9	21	R	10	R	9	R	4	1	12	10	6	1
3	(United Kingdom) Eddie Irvine	Jordan Racing	Reynard	Mugen Honda	15	R	8	6	15	R	14	NS	6	2	4	4	3	1	1	3	7	R	4	3	14	R
4	(United Kingdom) Allan McNish	DAMS	Lola	Mugen Honda	5	R	1	1	6	R6	5	16	10	6	10	2	4	R	3	1	22	R	2	R	7	8
5	(Italy) Gianni Morbidelli	Forti Corse	Lola	Ford Cosworth	14	8	26	R	17	3	11	R	2	4	6	1	8	R	7	R	24	R	7	7	1	3
6	(Italy) Marco Apicella	First Racing	Reynard	Mugen Honda	3	13	6	3	3	R	2	2	7	5	2	R	2	2	5	DIS(3)	1	R	5	R	11	5
7	(Switzerland) Andrea Chiesa	Paul Stewart Racing	Lola	Mugen Honda	6	2	5	R	16	R	8	5	8	7	14	R	12	R	10	5	3	2	11	5	4	R
8	(Italy) Andrea Montermini	Madgwick International	Reynard	Mugen Honda	1	R	9	4	19	R	4	3	4	R	13	R	11	R	13	R	20	9	8	2	25	R
9	(France) Jean-Marc Gounon	Madgwick International	Reynard	Mugen Honda	9	R	23	13	24	NQ	23	R	26	R	3	DIS(7)	6	3	17	6	11	4	14	4	24	R
10	(Italy) Fabrizio Giovanardi	First Racing	Reynard	Mugen Honda	16	R	10	R	2	2	13	6	21	10	15	6	13	7	19	R	18	5	18	R	10	R
11	(Australia) Gary Brabham	Middlebridge	Lola	Ford Cosworth	-	-	12	R	28	NQ	24	12	9	3	20	3	25	R14	8	8	27	NQ	13	8	23	11
12	(Canada) John Jones	Paul Stewart Racing	Lola	Mugen Honda	7	3	20	11	9	4	20	R	11	R	19	R	28	NQ	29	NQ	25	11	22	9	29	NQ
13	(United Kingdom) Damon Hill	Middlebridge	Lola	Ford Cosworth	28	NQ	3	R	13	R	9	7	1	11	1	R	1	R	2	2	17	R	10	R	3	10
14	(Italy) Antonio Tamburini	Roni Motorsport	Reynard	Ford Cosworth	11	4	7	9	4	R	15	13	5	8	5	8	29	NQ	16	R	13	R	20	16	8	4
15	(France) Didier Artzet	Apomatox	Reynard	Ford Cosworth	29	NQ	21	R	8	R	18	11	12	R	16	R	14	8	-	-	8	3	-	-	-	-
16	(Italy) Fabrizio Barbazza	Crypton Engineering	Leyton House	Ford Cosworth	13	R	14	R	14	R	16	4	22	R	9	R	19	9	25	R	14	R	17	R	18	18
	(Portugal) Pedro Chaves	Madgwick International	Reynard	Ford Cosworth	-	-	-	-	-	-	-	-	-	-	-	-	-	-	12	4	12	R	34	NQ	21	14
18	(Germany) Heinz-Harald Frentzen	Jordan Racing	Reynard	Mugen Honda	8	R	16	R	10	R	17	17	19	R	12	5	15	6	24	7	6	R	15	R	27	NQ
19	(United Kingdom) Richard Dean	CoBRa Motorsports	Reynard	Mugen Honda	18	5	11	7	20	R	10	R	23	R	-	-	-	-	-	-	-	-	-	-	-	-
	(France) Franck Fréon	Galaxy Racing	Lola	Ford Cosworth	30	NQ	29	NQ	12	R5	28	NQ	31	NQ	-	-	-	-	-	-	-	-
	(France) Franck Fréon	Apomatox	Reynard	Ford Cosworth																			25	14	19	16
	(Austria) Karl Wendlinger	RSM Marko	Lola	Ford Cosworth	32	NQ	19	14	-	-	30	NQ	15	R	17	R	20	5	27	NQ	21	10	-	-	16	9
22	(Italy) Emanuele Naspetti	Jordan Racing	Reynard	Mugen Honda	17	R	13	10	22	R	-	-	13	R	7	R	5	R	18	R	16	6	30	NQ	-	-
	(France) Paul Belmondo	Superpower	Reynard	Mugen Honda	23	R	32	NQ	31	NQ	25	R	24	R	28	NQ	17	11	23	R	9	R	9	6	12	R
	(Germany) Michael Bartels	CoBRa Motorsports	Reynard	Mugen Honda	12	11	22	R	7	R	26	R	16	R	18	7	9	R	20	11	10	R	24	13	13	6
-	(United Kingdom) Andrew Gilbert-Scott	Leyton House Racing	Leyton House	Ford Cosworth	19	R	25	12	25	NQ	12	10	17	R	25	R	23	13
-	(United Kingdom) Andrew Gilbert-Scott	Apomatox	Reynard	Ford Cosworth															15	10	2	7	16	11	17	13
-	(Canada) Stéphane Proulx	Pacific Racing	Lola	Mugen Honda	10	12	4	R	11	R	19	R	20	R	11	R	21	10	6	R	15	R	6	R	5	7
-	(Switzerland) Jean-Denis Délétraz	First Racing	Reynard	Ford Cosworth	21	7	31	NQ	18	R	27	NQ	25	R	-	-	-	-	-	-	-	-	-	-	-	-
-	(Italy) Giovanni Bonanno	Becsport	Lola	Mugen Honda	22	10	15	8	29	NQ	7	R	-	-	-	-	-	-	21	9	28	NQ	-	-	-	-
-	(United Kingdom) Paul Warwick	Leyton House Racing	Leyton House	Ford Cosworth	-	-	-	-	-	-	-	-	-	-	-	-	-	-	22	R	19	8	21	NS	22	15
-	(Italy) Vincenzo Sospiri	Jordan Racing	Reynard	Mugen Honda	-	-	-	-	-	-	21	8	-	-	-	-	-	-	-	-	-	-	-	-	28	NQ
-	(France) Philippe Gache	Apomatox	Reynard	Ford Cosworth	20	9	27	NQ	21	R	6	14	18	R	23	R	18	R	-	-	-	-
-	(France) Philippe Gache	Galaxy Racing	Lola	Ford Cosworth																			3	R	9	R
-	(United Kingdom) Phil Andrews	Superpower	Reynard	Mugen Honda	25	14	18	R	30	NQ	29	NQ	28	NQ	24	R	16	12	4	R	23	R	26	12	20	19
-	(Switzerland) Philippe Favre	Leyton House Racing	Leyton House	Ford Cosworth	-	-	-	-	-	-	-	-	-	-	-	-	-	-	11	12	26	NS	23	15	30	NQ
-	(Switzerland) Alain Menu	CoBRa Motorsports	Reynard	Mugen Honda	-	-	-	-	-	-	-	-	-	-	-	-	-	-	-	-	-	-	-	-	15	12
-	(Mexico) Giovanni Aloi	GA Motorsports	Reynard	Ford Cosworth	24	R	24	15	26	NQ	22	15	-	-	-	-	-	-	-	-	-	-	-	-	-	-
-	(Italy) Giovanna Amati	Roni Motorsport	Reynard	Ford Cosworth	26	R	33	NQ	27	NQ	31	NQ	30	NQ
-	(Italy) Giovanna Amati	CoBRa Motorsports	Reynard	Mugen Honda											27	NQ	26	15	30	NQ	29	NQ	33	NQ	-	-
-	(France) Thierry Delubac	Galaxy Racing	Lola	Ford Cosworth	31	NQ	30	NQ	23	NQ	32	NQ	29	NQ	-	-	-	-	-	-	-	-
-	(France) Thierry Delubac	GA Motorsports	Reynard	Ford Cosworth																			19	17	26	17
-	(Italy) Paolo Delle Piane	Roni Motorsport	Reynard	Ford Cosworth	-	-	-	-	-	-	-	-	-	-	29	NQ	24	R	26	R	30	NQ	27	NQ	31	NQ
-	(Italy) Domenico Gitto	Becsport	Lola	Mugen Honda	-	-	-	-	-	-	-	-	-	-	26	R	22	R	-	-	-	-	-	-	-	-
-	(Brazil) Marco Greco	Pacific Racing	Lola	Mugen Honda	27	NQ	28	NQ	-	-	-	-	-	-
-	(Brazil) Marco Greco	GA Motorsports	Reynard	Ford Cosworth											22	R	27	NQ	28	NQ	-	-
-	(Brazil) Marco Greco	First Racing	Reynard	Ford Cosworth																			28	NQ	32	NQ
-	(Canada) Claude Bourbonnais	Pacific Racing	Lola	Mugen Honda	-	-	-	-	-	-	-	-	-	-	-	-	-	-	-	-	-	-	29	NQ	34	NQ
-	(Italy) Vittorio Zoboli	GA Motorsport	Reynard	Ford Cosworth	-	-	-	-	-	-	-	-	-	-	-	-	-	-	-	-	-	-	32	NQ	33	NQ
-	(Germany) Otto Rensing	Becsport	Reynard	Ford Cosworth	-	-	-	-	-	-	-	-	27	NQ	-	-	-	-	-	-	-	-	-	-	-	-
-	(Germany) Ellen Lohr	RSM Marko	Lola	Ford Cosworth	-	-	-	-	-	-	-	-	-	-	-	-	-	-	-	-	-	-	31	NQ	-	-
