= Schumacher (film) =

2021 German sports documentary film

- Directed by: Hanns-Bruno Kammertöns; Vanessa Nöcker; Michael Wech
- Produced by: Vanessa Nöcker; Benjamin Seikel
- Music by: Christian Wilckens; Peter Hinderthür
- Production company: B14 Film
- Distributed by: Netflix
- Release date: 15 September 2021
- Running time: 112 minutes
- Country: Germany
- Languages: German; English; French; Italian

Schumacher is a 2021 German sports documentary film co-directed by Hanns-Bruno Kammertöns, Vanessa Nöcker, and Michael Wech about the German Formula One racing driver Michael Schumacher that was distributed internationally on Netflix. The film was released on 15 September 2021 on Netflix for a year, to mark Schumacher's entry into Formula One thirty years previously. The film documents Schumacher's Formula One career and Scuderia Ferrari's return to dominance in 2000–2004. Brief family interviews throughout provide some insight into his personal life.

== Production ==
The film was produced in cooperation with Schumacher's family, using private family archives, Formula One archive footage, and interviews. The film features interviews with Schumacher's wife Corinna, his father Rolf, his brother Ralf, his children Gina-Maria and Mick, and his manager Willi Weber. There are interviews with prominent figures of Formula One including Jean Todt, Bernie Ecclestone, Sebastian Vettel, Mika Häkkinen, Damon Hill, David Coulthard, and Flavio Briatore.

It reveals that Schumacher raced on salvaged tyres in his early go-kart career, suffered from insomnia following Ayrton Senna's death, and contemplated skydiving in Dubai instead of skiing in Meribel before his accident in 2013. The film is co-directed by Hanns-Bruno Kammertöns, Vanessa Nöcker, and Michael Wech, and produced by Vanessa Nöcker and Benjamin Seikel for B14 Film.

== Reception ==
On the review aggregator website Rotten Tomatoes, 60% of 15 critics' reviews are positive, with an average rating of 6/10. The Guardian wrote that the film provides "singular insight" into Schumacher's personal life and struggles, before concluding that it is "light on details" and "somewhat sterile".
