= 1995 Formula One Indoor Trophy =

Auto race

The 1995 Formula One Indoor Trophy took place on 7–8 December at the Bologna Motor Show. The winner was Luca Badoer in a Minardi-Ford.

== Participants ==
| Driver | Team |
|---|---|
| (Italy) Luca Badoer | Minardi-Ford |
| (Italy) Giancarlo Fisichella | Minardi-Ford |
| (Italy) Giovanni Lavaggi | Forti-Ford |
| (Italy) Pierluigi Martini | Minardi-Ford |
| (Italy) Andrea Montermini | Forti-Ford |
| (Italy) Vittorio Zoboli | Forti-Ford |

== Results ==
=== Preliminary rounds ===
| Pos | Driver | Team | Points |
|---|---|---|---|
| 1 | (Italy) Giancarlo Fisichella | Minardi-Ford | 10 |
| 2 | (Italy) Luca Badoer | Minardi-Ford | 8 |
| 3 | (Italy) Pierluigi Martini | Minardi-Ford | 5 |
| 4 | (Italy) Andrea Montermini | Forti-Ford | 4 |
| 5 | (Italy) Giovanni Lavaggi | Forti-Ford | 3 |
| 6 | (Italy) Vittorio Zoboli | Forti-Ford | 0 |

=== Knockout stage ===
Semi-finals
(Italy) Giancarlo Fisichella | 2
(Italy) Pierluigi Martini | 1
(Italy) Luca Badoer | 2
(Italy) Andrea Montermini | 0

Final
(Italy) Giancarlo Fisichella | 1
(Italy) Luca Badoer | 2
Third place final
(Italy) Pierluigi Martini | 2
(Italy) Andrea Montermini | 0
