= 1992 Buenos Aires Grand Prix – World Cup Formula 3000 =

The Buenos Aires Circuit No:9

The 1992 Buenos Aires Grand Prix was a motor race held at Buenos Aires on December 13, 1992, in the Autódromo Oscar Alfredo Gálvez.

It was titled the World Cup Formula 3000 and was a one-off non-championship event. While most of the field comprised teams from the 1992 International Formula 3000 season, the field of 20 drivers was primarily a mix of F3000, British Formula 2 and Formula 3 Sudamericana drivers, along with a handful of drivers from junior European formula.

== Classification ==
Pos	Driver	Team	Car	Laps	Time/Retired
1	(Italy) Andrea Montermini	(Italy) A&A Junior Team	Reynard 91D - Cosworth	50	1:09'35.631
2	(France) Emmanuel Collard	(France) Apomatox	Lola T92/50 - Cosworth	50	1:09'43.729
3	(Monaco) Olivier Beretta	(Italy) Forti Corse	Reynard 92D - Cosworth	50	1:01'25.739
4	(Italy) Vittorio Zoboli	(Italy) Advance Racing	Reynard 92D - Cosworth	50	1:09'47.768
5	(Argentina) José Luis Di Palma	(Italy) Crypton Engineering	Reynard 92D - Cosworth	50	1:10'19.960
6	(Argentina) Gabriel Furlán	(Italy) Forti Corse	Reynard 92D - Cosworth	50	1:10'40.723
7	(Italy) Paolo Delle Piane	(United Kingdom) CoBRa Motorsport	Reynard 92D - Cosworth	50	1:10'43.352
8	(France) Yvan Muller	(United Kingdom) Omegaland Racing	Reynard 91D - Cosworth	50	1:10'47.422
9	(Argentina) Alejandro Pagani	(Italy) Il Barone Rampante	Reynard 92D - Cosworth	49	-1 Lap
10	(Brazil) Constantino de Oliveira Jr.	(France) Apomatox	Lola T92/50 - Cosworth	49	
11	(United States) David Kudrave	(United Kingdom) CoBRa Motorsport	Reynard 92D - Cosworth	49	
12	(Argentina) Guillermo Kissling	(Italy) Il Barone Rampante	Reynard 92D - Cosworth	49	
Ret	(Netherlands) Peter Kox	(United Kingdom) Weylock Racing	Reynard 91D - Cosworth	48	
Ret	(New Zealand) Craig Baird	(United Kingdom) Weylock Racing	Reynard 91D - Cosworth	40	DNF
Ret	(Argentina) Fabian Malta	(United Kingdom) GJ Motorsport	Reynard 92D - Cosworth	28	DNF
Ret	(United Kingdom) John Graham	(United Kingdom) CoBRa Motorsport	Reynard 91D - Cosworth	27	DNF
Ret	(Italy) Andrea Gilardi	(Italy) Crypton Engineering	Reynard 92D - Cosworth	24	DNF
Ret	(Italy) Mario Molteni	(United Kingdom) Il Barone Rampante	Reynard 92D - Zytek/Judd	5	DNF
Ret	(Germany) Klaus Panchryz	(Germany) Team MIS	Reynard 91D - Cosworth	2	DNF
Ret	(Austria) Mercedes Stermitz	(United Kingdom) GJ Motorsport	Reynard 91D - Cosworth		DNS
