= Gabriel Furlán =

Argentine racing driver

Néstor Gabriel Furlán
- Born: October 13, 1964 (age 62) Buenos Aires, Argentina

Previous series
- 2008-11 2004 2004 1994–95 1999-2009 1992 1991 1990 1989-90 1987-89 1992-2001 1985 1984-86: Top Race V6; Super Turismo V8; Stock Car Brasil; TC 2000; World Cup Formula 3000; International Formula 3000; Italian Formula Three; Monaco Grand Prix Formula Three; Formula Three Sudamericana; Fórmula 2 Codasur; Formula Renault Argentina

Championship titles
- 1989, 1994, 1996, 1998 1986: Formula Three Sudamericana Formula Renault Argentina

Néstor Gabriel Furlán (born October 13, 1964) is an Argentine racing driver. He has run in different series, with major success in Formula Three Sudamericana and TC2000.

Furlán won the Formula Three Sudamericana championship four times, in 1989, 1994, 1996, and 1998, and the Formula Renault Argentina title once, in 1986.

Between 1992 and 2019, Furlán owned the GF Racing team.

== Racing record ==
=== Career summary ===
| Season | Series | Team | Races | Wins | Poles | Podiums | Points | Position |
|---|---|---|---|---|---|---|---|---|
| 1984 | Formula Renault Argentina | | ? | ? | ? | ? | ? | ? |
| 1985 | Formula Renault Argentina | | 12 | 0 | 1 | 3 | 16 | 8th |
| 1985 | Fórmula 2 Codasur | | 2 | 0 | 0 | 0 | 0 | N/A |
| 1986 | Formula Renault Argentina | | 12 | 3 | 5 | 7 | 16 | **1st** |
| 1987 | Formula Three Sudamericana | Maldonado Competición | 11 | 2 | 1 | 3 | 32 | 4th |
| 1988 | Formula Three Sudamericana | Maldonado Competición | 7 | 0 | 1 | 3 | 39 | **3rd** |
| 1988 | Formula Three Sudamericana | Sommi-Zanón | 5 | 0 | 0 | 4 | 39 | **3rd** |
| 1989 | Formula Three Sudamericana | Sommi-Zanón | 12 | 5 | 4 | 7 | 57 | **1st** |
| 1989 | Monaco Grand Prix Formula Three | Gustavo Sommi | 1 | 0 | 0 | 0 | N/A | 11th |
| 1990 | Italian Formula Three | Jolly Club | 11 | 0 | 0 | 1 | 10 | 13th |
| 1990 | Monaco Grand Prix Formula Three | Jolly Club | 1 | 0 | 0 | 0 | N/A | 16th |
| 1991 | International Formula 3000 | Junior Team | 9 | 0 | 0 | 0 | 1 | 19th |
| 1992 | World Cup Formula 3000 | Forti Corse | 1 | 0 | 0 | 0 | N/A | 6th |
| 1992 | Formula Three Sudamericana | GF Motorsport | 12 | 2 | ? | 5 | 38 | 5th |
| 1993 | Formula Three Sudamericana | GF Motorsport | 12 | 3 | ? | 7 | 52 | **3rd** |
| 1994 | Formula Three Sudamericana | GF Motorsport | 11 | 7 | ? | 9 | 79 | **1st** |
| 1994 | TC 2000 | Ford | 14 | 0 | 0 | 0 | 34 | 11th |
| 1995 | Formula Three Sudamericana | GF Motorsport | 11 | 1 | ? | 4 | 35.5 | 4th |
| 1995 | TC 2000 | INI Competición | 14 | 0 | 0 | 1 | 38 | 9th |
| 1996 | Formula Three Sudamericana | GF Motorsport | 11 | 6 | ? | 7 | 144 | **1st** |
| 1997 | Formula Three Sudamericana | GF Motorsport | 12 | 3 | 2 | 7 | 139 | **2nd** |
| 1998 | Formula Three Sudamericana | GF Motorsport | 12 | 6 | ? | 9 | 175 | **1st** |
| 1999 | Formula Three Sudamericana | GF Motorsport | 4 | 0 | 0 | 0 | 0 | N/A |
| 1999 | TC 2000 | GF Motorsport | 18 | 0 | 0 | 1 | 44 | 13th |
| 2000 | Formula Three Sudamericana | GF Motorsport | 8 | 2 | 2 | 5 | 90 | 7th |
| 2000 | TC 2000 | GF Motorsport | 14 | 1 | 1 | 3 | 67 | 9th |
| 2001 | Formula Three Sudamericana | GF Motorsport | 4 | 0 | 0 | 1 | 26 | 10th |
| 2001 | TC 2000 | GF Motorsport | 14 | 0 | 0 | 3 | 63 | 6th |
| 2002 | TC 2000 | GF Motorsport | 14 | 1 | 3 | 4 | 81 | 5th |
| 2003 | TC 2000 | GF Racing | 14 | 0 | 1 | 4 | 78 | 5th |
| 2004 | TC 2000 | GF Racing | 14 | 1 | 2 | 5 | 91 | 6th |
| 2004 | Stock Car Brasil | Scuderia 111 | 1 | 0 | 0 | 0 | 0 | N/A |
| 2005 | TC 2000 | GF Racing | 14 | 0 | 0 | 4 | 63 | 10th |
| 2005 | TC 2000 | Toyota Team Argentina | 14 | 0 | 0 | 4 | 63 | 10th |
| 2006 | TC 2000 | Toyota Team Argentina | 14 | 0 | 0 | 1 | 46 | 11th |
| 2007 | TC 2000 | Toyota Team Argentina | 11 | 0 | 0 | 0 | 16 | 16th |
| 2008 | TC 2000 | Bainotti Dowen Pagio | 1 | 0 | 0 | 0 | 0 | N/A |
| 2008 | Top Race V6 | GF Racing | 12 | 0 | 0 | 0 | 65 | 18th |
| 2009 | TC 2000 Endurance series | DTA | 1 | 0 | 0 | 0 | 0 | N/A |
| 2009 | Top Race V6 | GF Racing | 14 | 0 | 1 | 1 | 42 | **3rd** |
| 2010 | Top Race V6 | GF Racing | 5 | 1 | 1 | 1 | 77 | 7th |
| 2011 | Top Race V6 | GF Racing | 13 | 0 | 0 | 1 | 42 | 10th |

=== Complete International Formula 3000 results ===
(key) (Races in bold indicate pole position) (Races in italics indicate fastest lap)

| Year | Entrant | Chassis | Engine | Tyres | 1 | 2 | 3 | 4 | 5 | 6 | 7 | 8 | 9 | 10 | DC | Points |
|---|---|---|---|---|---|---|---|---|---|---|---|---|---|---|---|---|
| 1991 | Junior Team | Reynard 91D | Judd | A | VAL; 9 | PAU; DNQ | JER; Ret | MUG; Ret | PER; 7 | HOC; 8 | BRH; Ret | SPA; Ret | BUG; 6 | NOG; Ret | 19th | 1 |

Sporting positions
| Preceded by Daniel Neviani | Argentine Formula Renault Champion; 1986 | Succeeded by Miguel Angel Etchegaray |
| Preceded by Juan Carlos Giacchino | Formula Three Sudamericana Champion; 1989 | Succeeded by Christian Fittipaldi |
| Preceded by Fernando Croceri | Formula Three Sudamericana Champion; 1994 | Succeeded by Ricardo Zonta |
| Preceded by Ricardo Zonta | Formula Three Sudamericana Champion; 1996 | Succeeded by Bruno Junqueira |
| Preceded by Bruno Junqueira | Formula Three Sudamericana Champion; 1998 | Succeeded by Hoover Orsi |
