= Didier Artzet =

French former racing driver

- Nationality: (France) French
- Born: 10 February 1963 (age 63) Nice, France

Previous series
- 1988-1990; 1987-1988; 1987; 1986; 1985; 1985: International Formula 3000; French Formula Three Championship; World Touring Car Championship; Formula Renault France; Peugeot 505 Trophy; French Formula Three Championship

Championship titles
- 1985: Peugeot 505 Trophy

Didier Artzet (born 10 February 1963 in Nice) is a French former racing driver.

== Career ==
Artzet began his professional racing career in Formula Renault and Formula 3 in his native France. In the 1986 International F3 race at Monaco, Artzet qualified on the front row of the grid driving a Ralt RT30. Although he ultimately finished the race in 12th, Artzet progressed to finish third in the Formula Renault France championship of the same year behind runaway champion Érik Comas and future Simtek driver Jean-Marc Gounon.

The following year, Artzet comprehensively took victory in the International F3 race at Monaco, having qualified on pole and set the fastest lap. He was joined on the podium by countryman Jean Alesi. He would finish seventh overall in the seasons Formula 3 France series. In the same year, Artzet also raced a single event in the World Touring Car Championship for Wolf Racing in their Ford Sierra.

For 1988, Artzet entered three race weekends in the International Formula 3000 series with Team Racetech 3000. He failed to qualify for two events, completing one race at Zolder where he qualified 17th and finished 14th. Artzet would compete again in that years International F3 race at Monaco, but despite securing pole position he failed to finish due to a collision on lap 10. He would race six times in the Formula 3 France series in 1988, securing two podium finishes.

A return to Formula 3000 in 1989 once again with Team Racetech 3000, Artzet qualified for the first three rounds of the season, his best result and only finish was 7th in the 1989 Rome Grand Prix at Vallelunga. For 1990, he switched to Apomatox 3000 and in his final race in the series at Birmingham managed to secure a podium finish in 3rd place. At the time, future Toyota F1 engineer Rémi Decorzent was the teams race engineer.

Artzet teamed up with Toyota Motorsport's TOM'S racing division in 1989 racing a Toyota 88C at the Coupe de Dijon and 24 Hours of Le Mans. He would also compete in the 24 Heures de Francorchamps in a TOM'S run Toyota Supra. After not racing in 1991, Artzet returned for a single race with Welter Racing at the 1992 24 Hours of Le Mans, qualifying 27th and retiring from the race.

== Personal life ==
Artzet now resides in Nouméa, New Caledonia. He often races his superbike at Eastern Creek.

== Career summary ==
| Season | Series | Team | Races | Wins | Poles | F/Laps | Podiums | Points | Position |
|---|---|---|---|---|---|---|---|---|---|
| 1985 | Formula 3 France | D.R.S | 1 | 0 | 0 | 0 | 0 | 6 | 19th |
| 1985 | Peugeot 505 Turbo Trophy | Peugeot Sport | | | | | | | 1st |
| 1986 | Formula Renault France | Ecurie Motul Nogaro | 13 | 1 | 0 | 0 | 7 | 87 | 3rd |
| 1986 | XLIV Grand Prix de Monaco de Formula 3 | Monaco Sponsoring | 1 | 0 | 0 | 0 | 0 | | 12th |
| 1987 | XLV Grand Prix de Monaco de Formula 3 | KTR | 1 | 1 | 1 | 1 | 1 | | 1st |
| 1987 | XXXIV Macau Formula 3 Grand Prix | ORECA | 1 | 0 | 0 | 0 | 0 | | 7th |
| 1987 | Formula 3 France | Danielsson, KTR | 13 | 0 | 1 | 1 | 2 | 52 | 7th |
| 1987 | World Touring Car Championship | Wolf Racing | 1 | 0 | 0 | 0 | 0 | 0 | NC |
| 1988 | XLVI Grand Prix de Monaco de Formula 3 | BSL Compétition | 1 | 0 | 1 | 0 | 0 | | NC |
| 1988 | XXXV Macau Formula 3 Grand Prix | Intersport Racing | 1 | 0 | 0 | 0 | 0 | | NC |
| 1988 | Formula 3 France | BSL Compétition | 6 | 0 | 2 | 2 | 2 | 32 | 8th |
| 1988 | International Formula 3000 | Racetech 3000 | 1 | 0 | 0 | 0 | 0 | 0 | NC |
| 1989 | International Formula 3000 | Racetech 3000 | 3 | 0 | 0 | 0 | 0 | 0 | NC |
| 1989 | XLVII Grand Prix de Monaco de Formula 3 | Cellnet Intersport Racing | 1 | 0 | 0 | 0 | 0 | | 5th |
| 1989 | 24 Hours of Le Mans | Toyota Team Tom's | 1 | 0 | 0 | 0 | 0 | | NC |
| 1990 | International Formula 3000 | Apotamox | 7 | 0 | 0 | 0 | 1 | 4 | 15th |
| 1992 | World Sportscar Championship | Welter Racing | 1 | 0 | 0 | 0 | 0 | 0 | NC |
