= Vittorio Zoboli =

Italian racing driver (born 1968)

Vittorio Zoboli (born 24 June 1968 in Bologna, Italy) is an Italian racing driver. His career has spanned Formula One, Formula Three, Formula 3000 and sports car racing, in addition to two appearances in the Formula One Indoor Trophy.

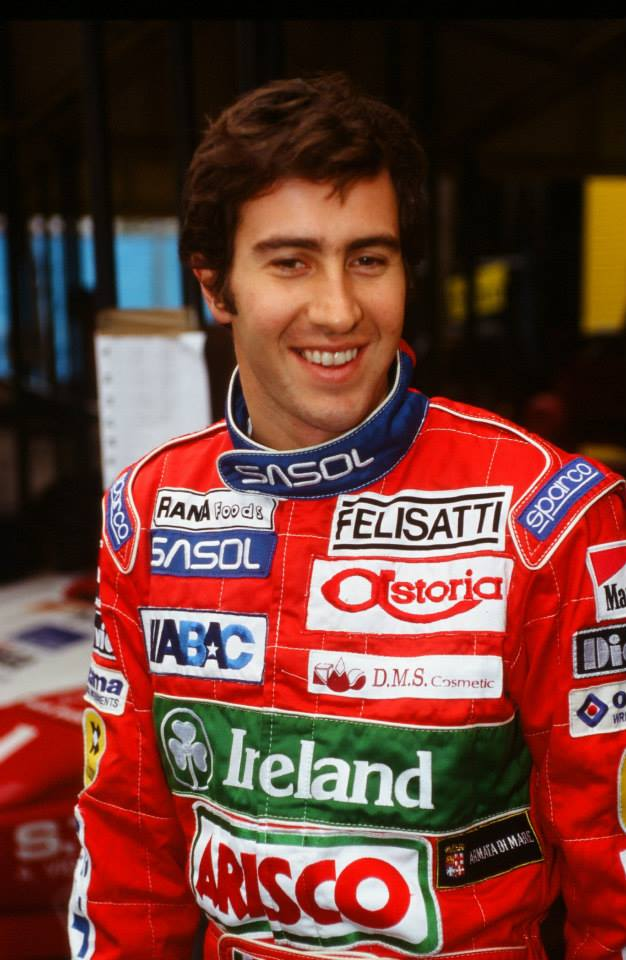
Vittorio Zoboli

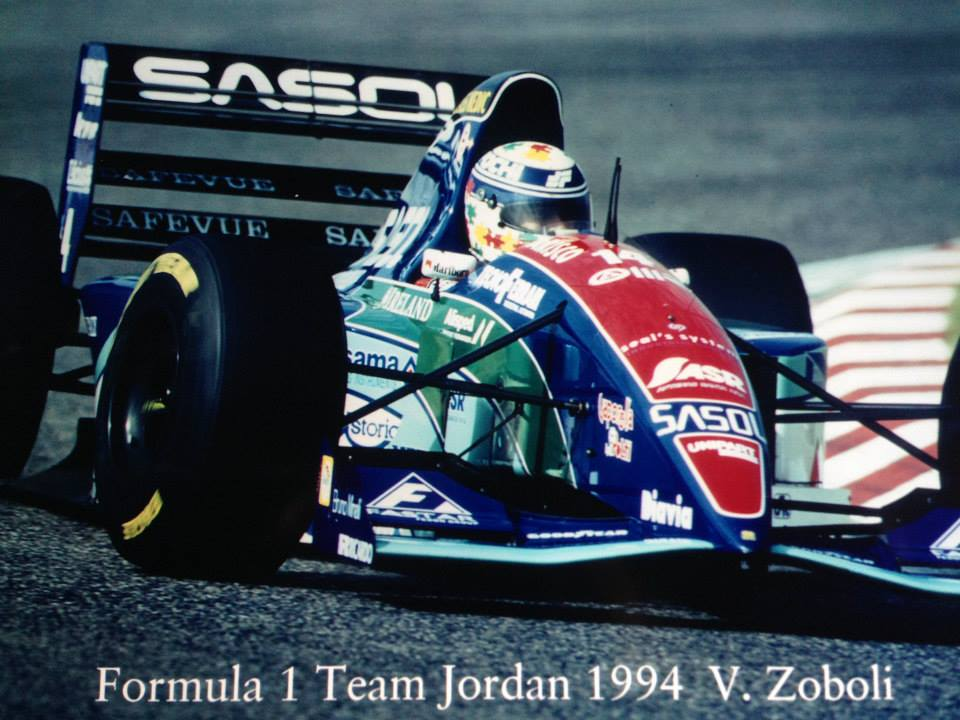
Formula 1 Team Jordan 1994

== Career ==
=== Kart ===
1980-1984 Karting 3rd Classified 100 Super European Championship; 1st Classified 100 Super International Cup, 2nd Classified 100 Cadets Italian Championship, 3rd Classified 100 National Italian Championship, 2nd Classified 100 Cadets Italy-France.

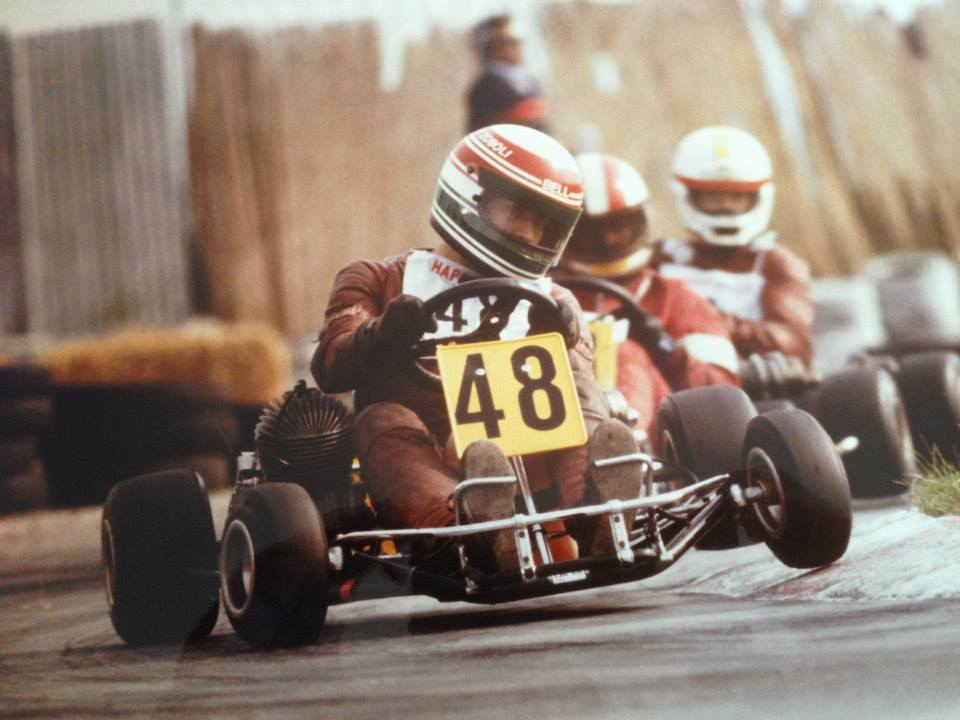
Kart

=== Formula Four ===
Zoboli won the 1986 Italian Formula Four Championship with seven race wins.

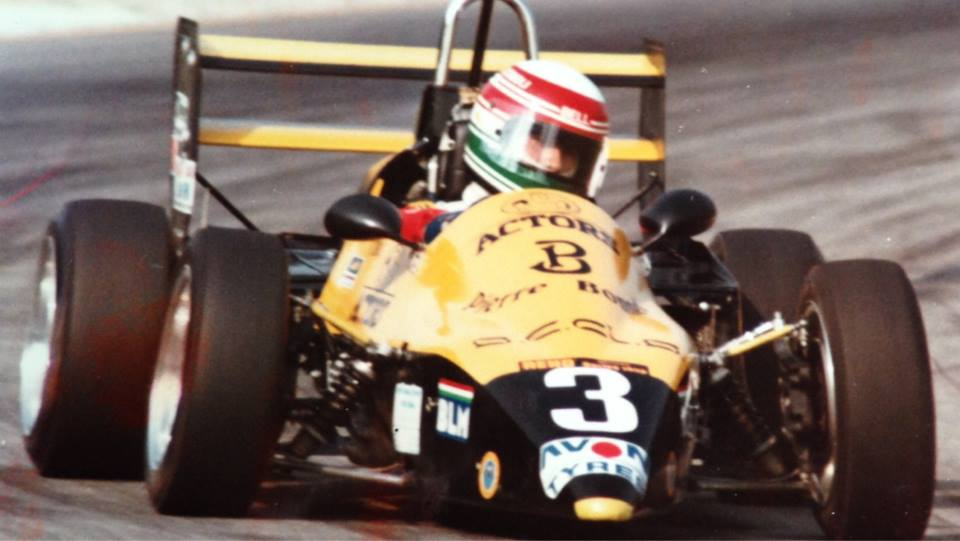
Formula Four 1987

=== Formula Three ===
1988 Best Rookie in Formula Three with Team Cevenini sponsor Nike's driver. Vittorio Zoboli's Marlboro driver, competed in the Italian Formula Three Championship for 1989, driving a Dallara chassis run by the Forti Corse team. He finished in sixteenth place in the drivers' championship, with two points to his name.

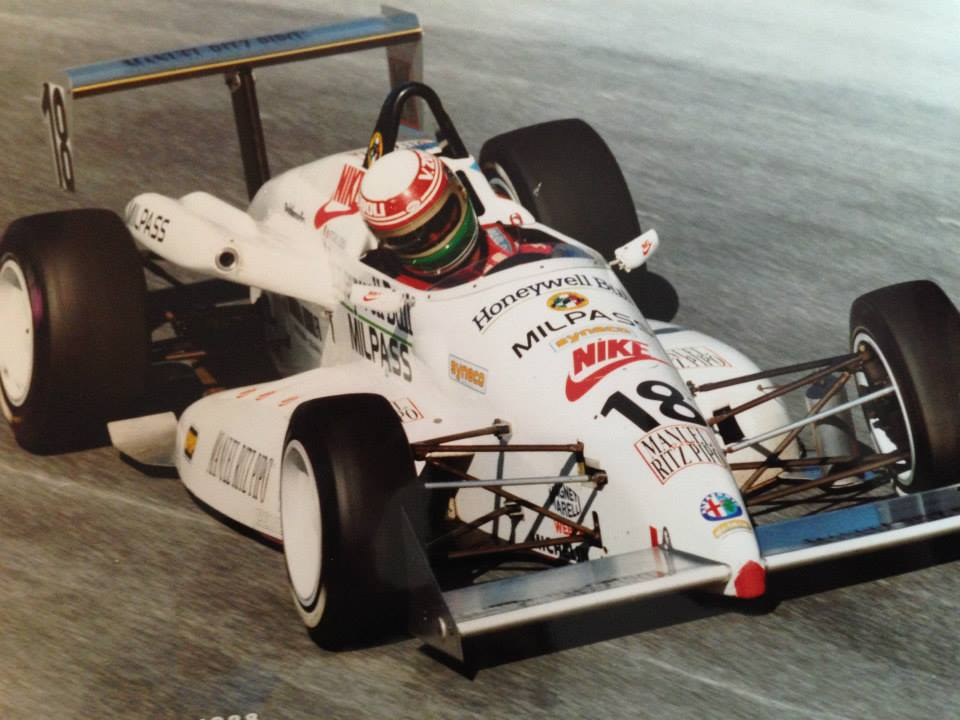
Formula 3 1988

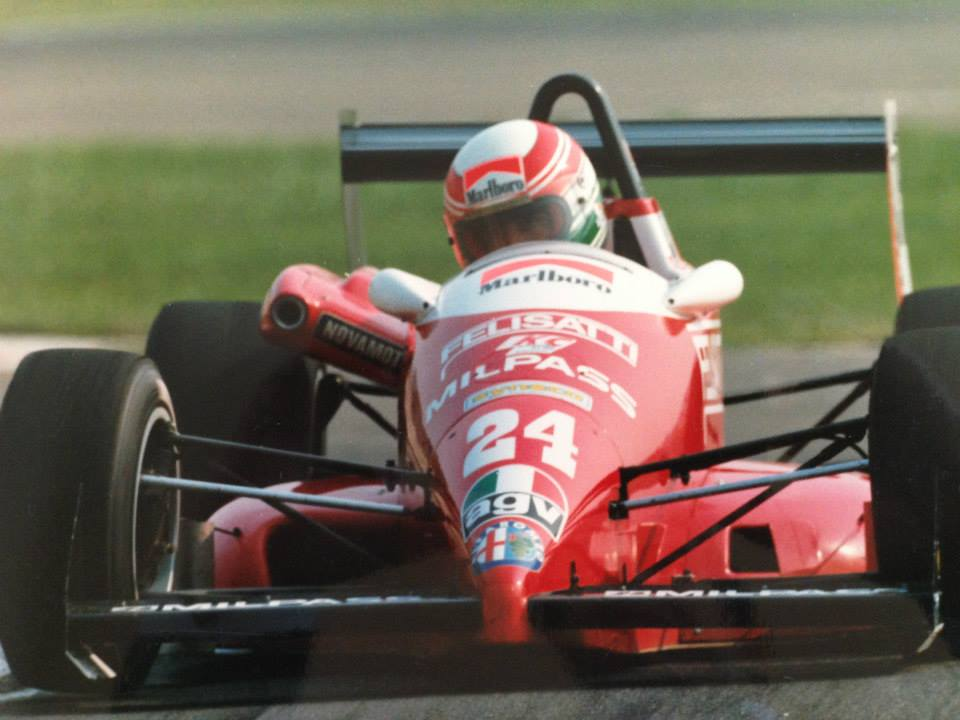
Formula 3 1989

=== Formula 3000 ===
Zoboli moved up to the British Formula 3000 series for 1990, driving for the GA Motorsport team. He scored two podium finishes and set a fastest lap on his way to fifth position overall.

At the end of the season, Zoboli took part in the final two rounds of the more prestigious International Formula 3000 season, again with GA Motorsport. However, he failed to qualify in both of these appearances. He moved to the Junior Team outfit for the 1991 season, competing in the first eight of the championship's ten rounds and qualifying for five of them, but failing to score any points. Another move, to the one-car Advance Racing team, for 1992 brought about an improvement to thirteenth in the championship with three points. He also finished in fourth position in the season-opening, non-championship F3000 World Cup event held at the Autódromo Juan y Oscar Gálvez. He then moved to the ambitious Il Barone Rampante team for 1993, but it folded mid-season without Zoboli scoring any points.

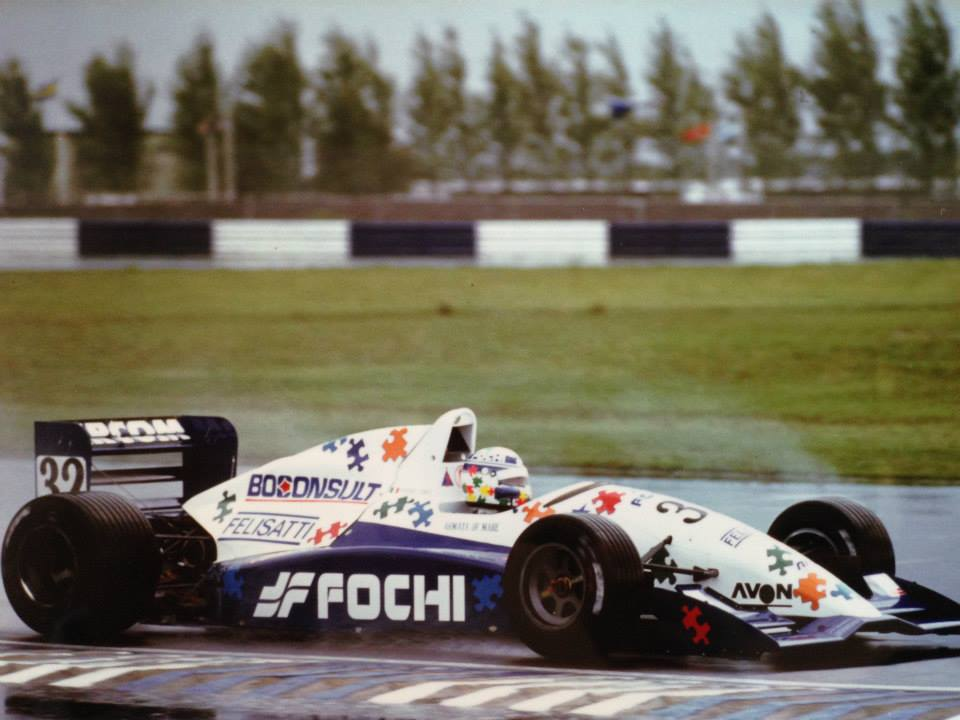
Formula 3000 1992

=== Formula One ===
Zoboli was the test driver for Jordan Grand Prix during the 1994 Formula One World Championship. Despite being left without a permanent drive until 1995, Zoboli made an appearance at the Formula One Indoor Trophy in 1993, driving for the Jordan team alongside regular team member Rubens Barrichello. In the preliminary rounds, he scored enough points to beat BMS Scuderia Italia drivers Michele Alboreto and Fabrizio Barbazza, but was then knocked out by his team-mate in the semi-finals. He did, however, take third place after defeating Alboreto again in an additional race for the position.

Zoboli returned to the event in 1995 after it was not held the previous year. On this occasion, he returned to his F3 employer Forti (now an F1 team) alongside Andrea Montermini and Giovanni Lavaggi, but was knocked out in the preliminary rounds.

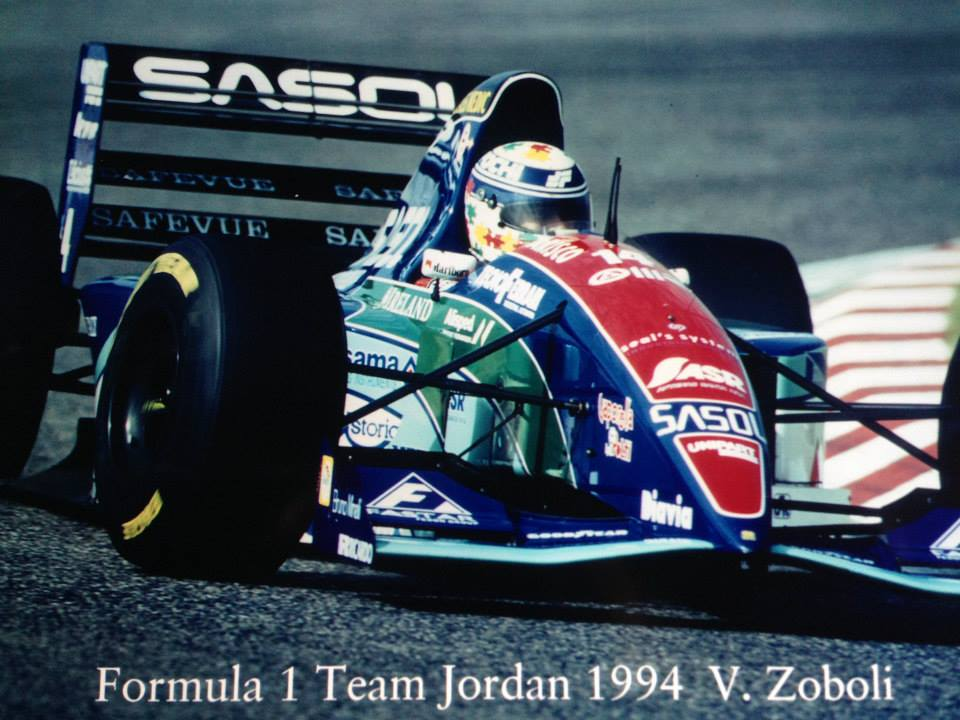
Formula 1 Team Jordan 1994

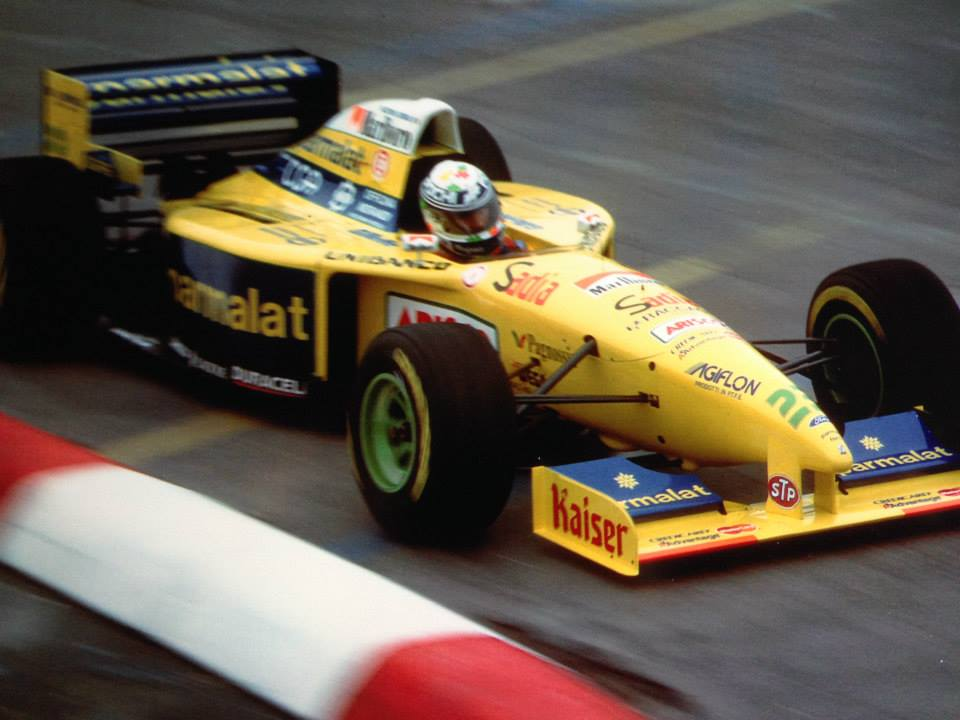
Formula 1 Team Forti 1995

=== Sports car racing ===
With his single-seater career petering out, Zoboli turned to sports car racing. His début in the category came in 1995, when he competed in two rounds of the BPR Global GT Series in a Jolly Club-run Ferrari F40 1st Classified GP Estoril - 2nd Classified GP Nurburgring. He then competed in the Lamborghini GTR Supertrophy between 1997 and 2002, with seven victories and numerous podium placements, 2nd Classified in Championship 2001.

Between 2002 and 2004, Zoboli competed in nine rounds of the FIA GT Championship, driving a Ferrari 550 Maranello for the Force One Racing with David Halliday and Philippe Alliot and Wieth Racing teams. In 2006, he drove in the FIA GT3 Lamborghini Gallardo Team Reiter co-driver Albert II Thurn und Taxis, finishing in fourth position.

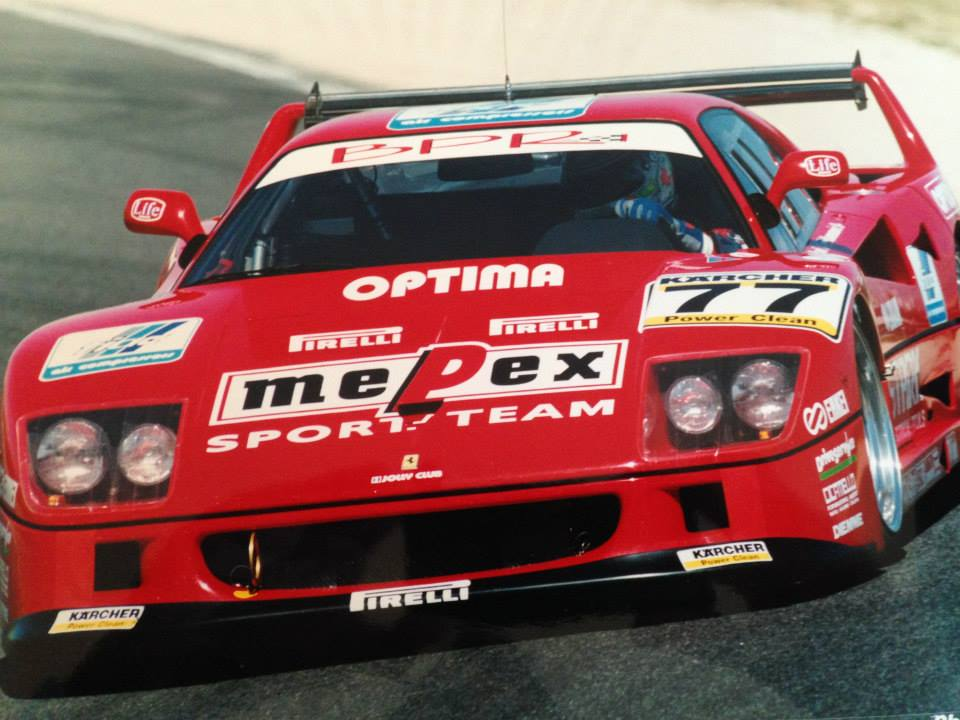
Ferrari F40 1995

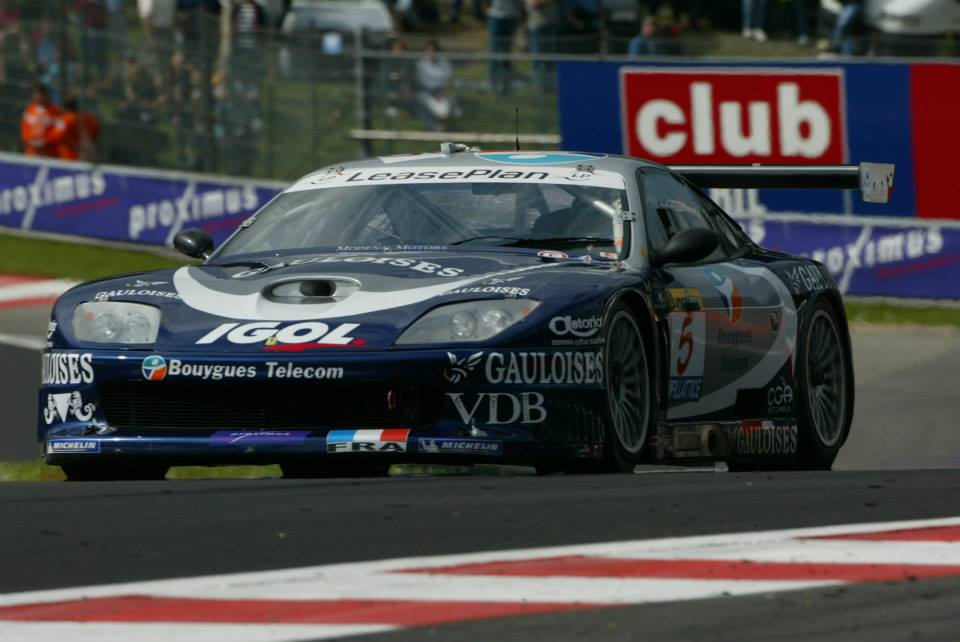
Ferrari 550 Maranello 2000

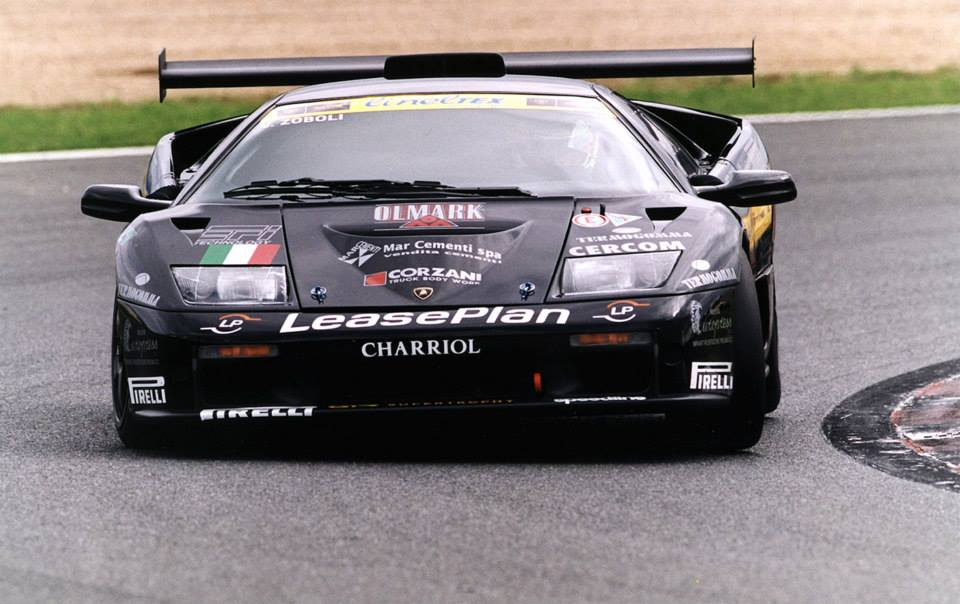
Lamborghini Diablo GTR 2000

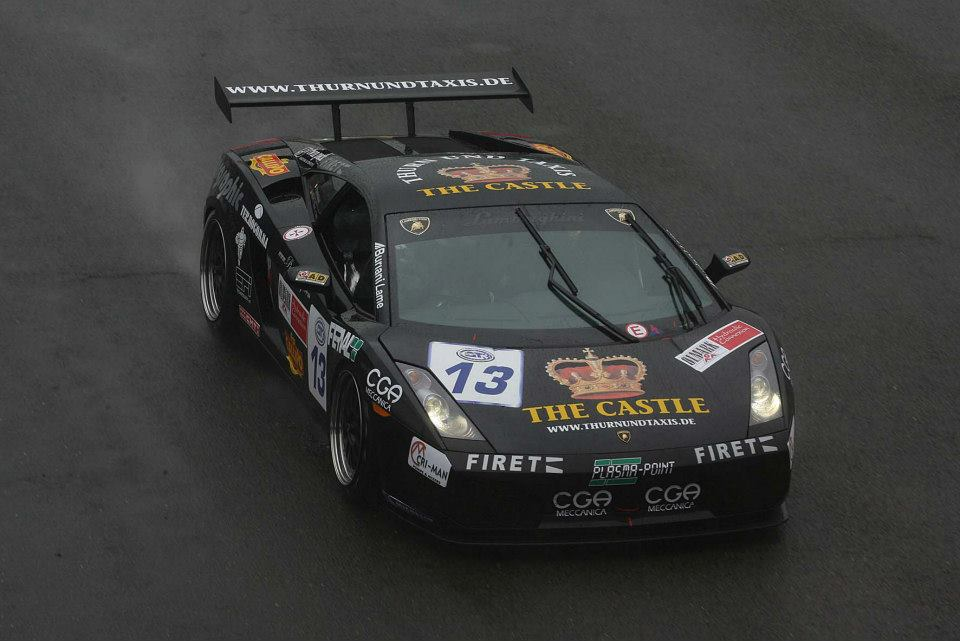
Lamborghini Gallardo 2006

=== Squadra Corse Automobili Lamborghini ===
2012 – 2013 Automobili Lamborghini Blancapain Supertrofeo - General manager 2009 – 2011 Automobili Lamborghini Blancapain Supertrofeo - Coordination

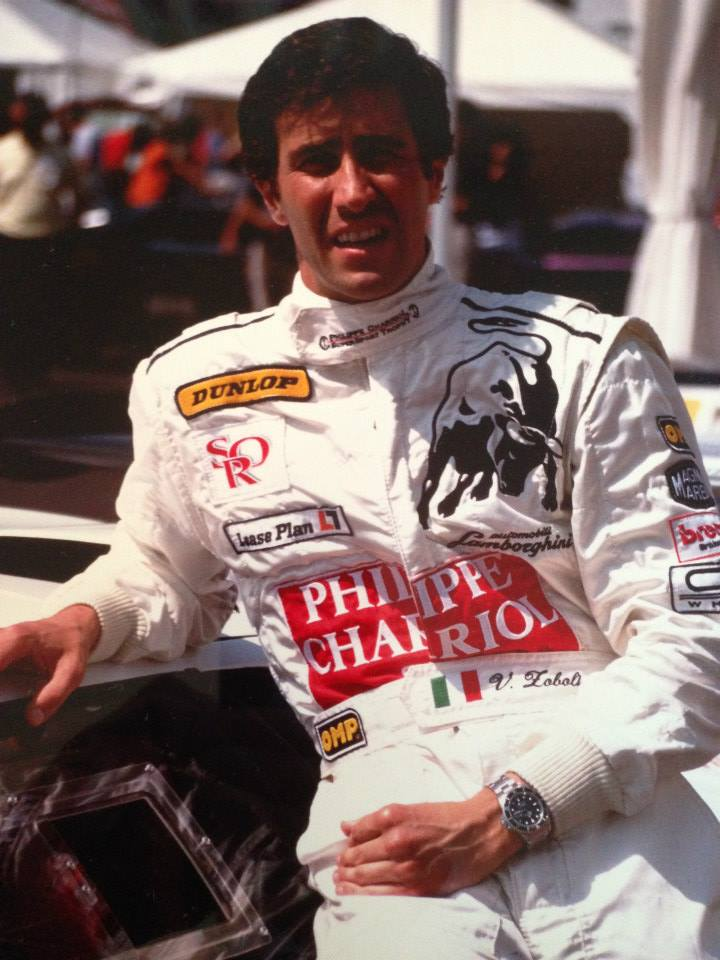
Vittorio Zoboli

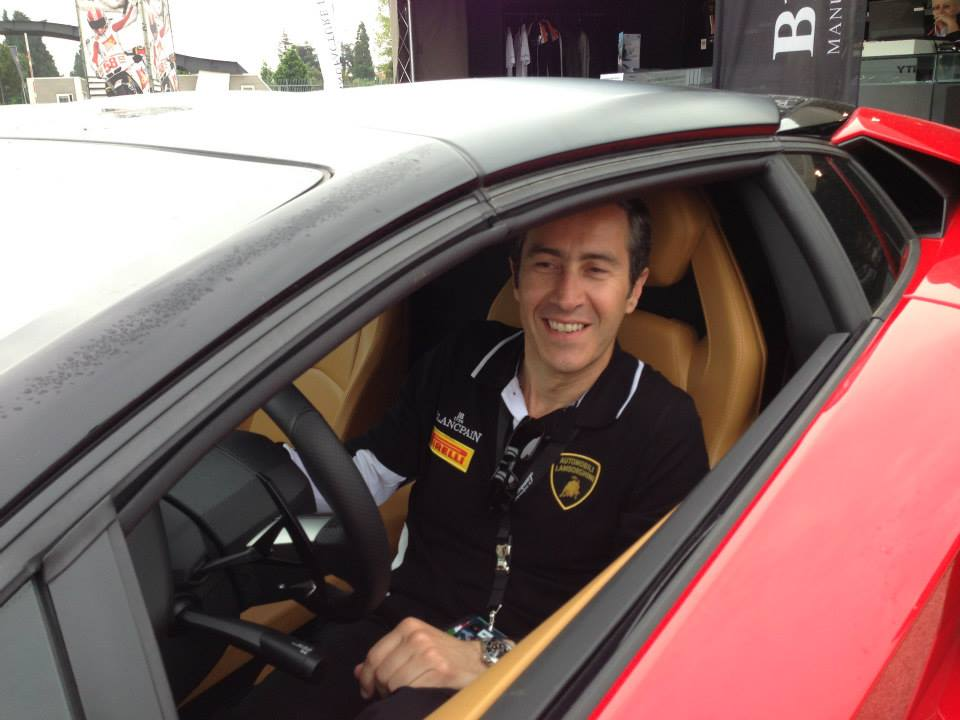
Vittorio Zoboli

== Racing record ==
=== Career summary ===
| Season | Series | Team name | Races | Poles | Wins | Points | Final Placing |
|---|---|---|---|---|---|---|---|
| 1989 | Italian Formula Three | Forti Corse | 9 | 0 | 0 | 2 | 16th |
| 1990 | British Formula 3000 | GA Motorsport | 9 | 0 | 0 | 16 | 5th |
| 1990 | International Formula 3000 | GA Motorsport | 2 | 0 | 0 | 0 | NC |
| 1991 | International Formula 3000 | Junior Team | 8 | 0 | 0 | 0 | NC |
| 1992 | International Formula 3000 | Advance Racing | 9 | 0 | 0 | 3 | 13th |
| 1992 | Formula 3000 World Cup | Advance Racing | 1 | 0 | 0 | N/A | 4th |
| 1993 | International Formula 3000 | Il Barone Rampante | 4 | 0 | 0 | 0 | NC |
| 1993 | Formula One Indoor Trophy | Jordan | 1 | 0 | 0 | N/A | 3rd |
| 1995 | BPR Global GT Series | Jolly Club | 2 | 0 | 0 | 0 | NC |
| 1995 | Formula One Indoor Trophy | Forti | 1 | 0 | 0 | N/A | 6th |
| 1997-2002 | Lamborghini GTR Supertrophy | | | | | | |
| 2002 | FIA GT Championship | Force One Racing | 1 | 0 | 0 | 0 | NC |
| 2003 | FIA GT Championship | Wieth Racing | 6 | 0 | 0 | 1 | ? |
| 2004 | FIA GT Championship | Wieth Racing | 2 | 0 | 0 | 0 | NC |
| 2006 | FIA GT3 Lamborghini Manufacturers' Cup | Reiter Engineering | 2 | 0 | 0 | 4 | 4th |

=== Complete International Formula 3000 results ===
(key) (Races in bold indicate pole position) (Races in italics indicate fastest lap)

| Year | Entrant | Chassis | Engine | Tyres | 1 | 2 | 3 | 4 | 5 | 6 | 7 | 8 | 9 | 10 | 11 | DC | Points |
|---|---|---|---|---|---|---|---|---|---|---|---|---|---|---|---|---|---|
| 1990 | GA Motorsport | Reynard 90D | Cosworth | A | DON | SIL | PAU | JER | MNZ | PER | HOC | BRH | BIR | BUG; DNQ | NOG; DNQ | NC | 0 |
| 1991 | Junior Team | Reynard 91D | Judd | A | VAL; Ret | PAU; DNQ | JER; Ret | MUG; DNQ | PER; Ret | HOC; DNQ | BRH; 13 | SPA; Ret | BUG | NOG | | NC | 0 |
| 1992 | Advance Racing | Reynard 92D | Cosworth | A | SIL; Ret | PAU; 4 | CAT; 12 | PER | HOC; 14 | NUR; 12 | SPA; 15 | ALB; 13 | NOG; 12 | MAG; Ret | | 13th | 3 |
| 1993 | Il Barone Rampante | Reynard 93D | Cosworth | A | DON; Ret | SIL; 12 | PAU; DNQ | PER; Ret | HOC | NUR | SPA | MAG | NOG | | | NC | 0 |
