= Ralt RT33 =

The Ralt RT33 was a Formula 3 racing car that was developed and built by Ralt in 1989 and was used in various Formula 3 championships. A total of 37 chassis' were made.

== Development history and technology ==
The RT33 was the logical further development of the RT32 from 1988. As with the previous model, the RT33 used both aluminum and carbon fiber as the material for the monocoque chassis. To improve aerodynamics, Ron Tauranac rented a wind tunnel during the development phase. The result was new sidepods and a completely new rear end with a rear wing that was connected to the body on the left and right. New regulations and the resulting radial tires that Avon supplied made it necessary to revise the suspension in order to achieve better traction.

The engines came from Volkswagen and Mugen. A total of 118 chassis were built and delivered by Ralt in 1989 and 1990. Power outputs for the four-cylinder engines was around 171 hp (128 kW).

== Racing history ==
In 1989, the RT33 became the all-important racing car in the Formula 3 racing series. In the British Formula 3 Championship, David Brabham won the general classification ahead of fellow drivers Allan McNish and Derek Higgins . Steve Robertson was fifth overall and Belgian Philippe Adams sixth. In the German championship, Karl Wendlinger triumphed, whose RT33 was entered by Helmut Marko. In the Japanese series, Masahiko Kageyama remained successful with five race wins.
