= Thierry Delubac =

French former racing driver (born 1963)

Thierry Delubac (born 23 March 1963) is a French former racing driver.
