= Reynard 903 =

Race car

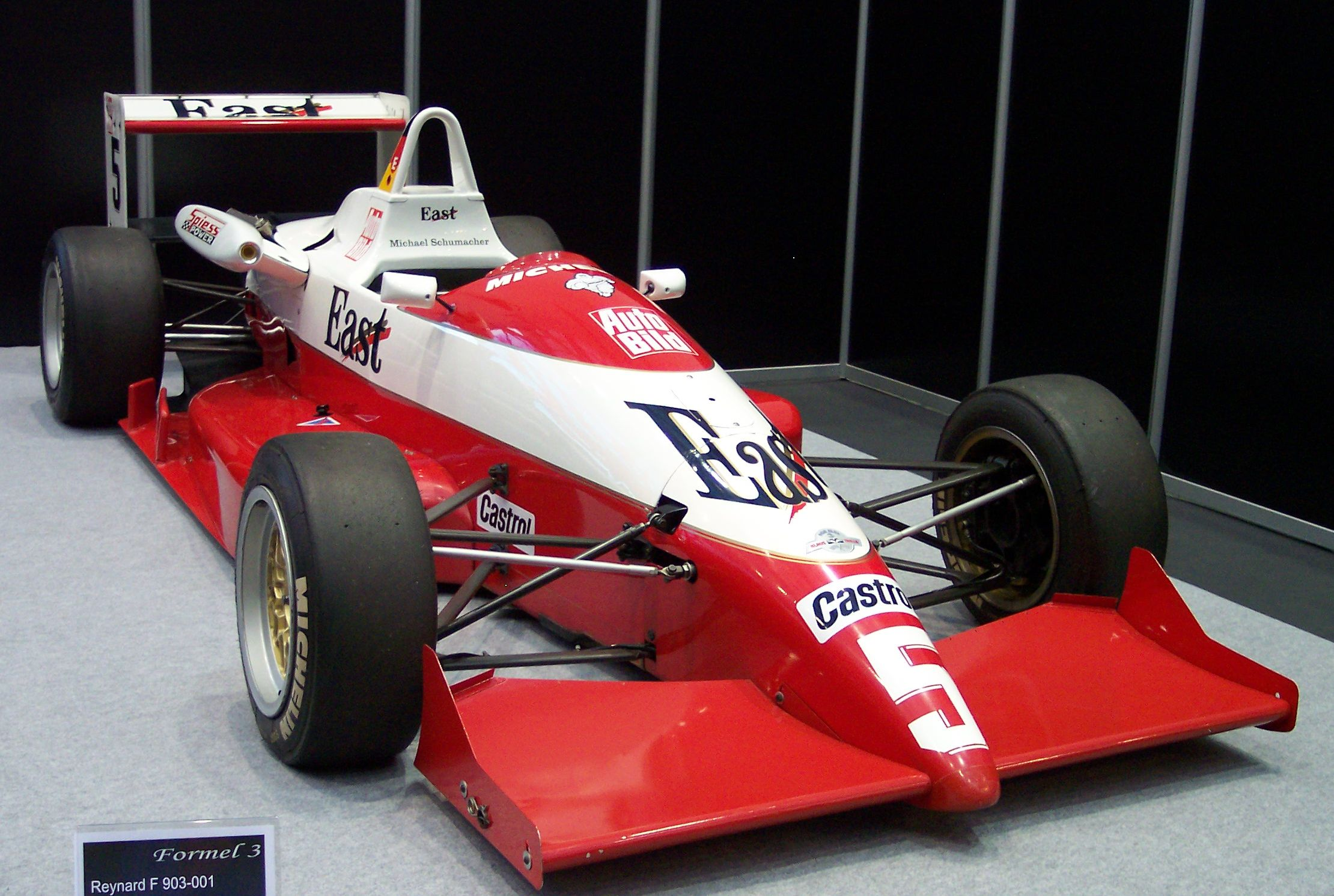
- Category: Formula 3
- Constructor: Reynard

Technical specifications
- Chassis: Aluminum monocoque with rear sub-frame
- Length: 4,150 mm (163 in)
- Width: 1,800 mm (71 in)
- Height: 960 mm (38 in)
- Wheelbase: 2,045 mm (80.5 in)
- Engine: Mid-engine, longitudinally mounted, Alfa Romeo/Toyota/Volkswagen, 2.0 L (122.0 cu in), SOHC/DOHC I4, NA
- Transmission: Hewland 5-speed manual
- Power: 180–250 hp (134–186 kW)
- Weight: 470 kg (1,040 lb)

Competition history
- Debut: 1990

The Reynard 903 is an open-wheel Formula 3 race car, developed and built by Reynard in 1990.
