= 2011 Desafio Internacional das Estrelas =

Seasons
- ← 2010 2013 →

2011 Desafio Internacional das Estrelas was the seventh edition of Desafio Internacional das Estrelas (International Challenge of the Stars) with Lucas di Grassi as the defending champion. Races scheduled for 3–4 December at Arena Sapiens Park in Florianópolis-SC. The event was won by Jaime Alguersuari after he came 2nd in Race 1 and won Race 2.

== Participants ==
Country	No	Drivers	2011 series
Belgium	64	Jérôme d'Ambrosio	Formula One
Brazil	0	Cacá Bueno	Stock Car Brasil/Trofeo Linea Brasil
Brazil	1	Christian Fittipaldi	Trofeo Linea Brasil
Brazil	3	Antônio Pizzonia	Superleague Formula
Brazil	8	Nelson Piquet Jr.	NASCAR Camping World Truck Series
Brazil	9	Lucas di Grassi	Pirelli Formula One Testing
Brazil	10	Ricardo Zonta	Stock Car Brasil
Brazil	11	Rubens Barrichello	Formula One
Brazil	14	Luciano Burti	Stock Car Brasil
Brazil	16	Enrique Bernoldi	FIA GT1 World Championship
Brazil	18	Allam Khodair	Stock Car Brasil/Trofeo Linea Brasil/GT Brasil
Brazil	19	Felipe Massa	Formula One
Brazil	21	Leonardo Nienkotter	Trofeo Linea Brasil
Brazil	25	Tuka Rocha	Stock Car Brasil
Brazil	27	Vítor Meira	Indycar Series
Brazil	33	Bia Figueiredo	Indycar Series
Brazil	34	Hélio Castroneves	Indycar Series
Brazil	65	Max Wilson	Stock Car Brasil
Brazil	74	Popó Bueno	Stock Car Brasil/Trofeo Linea Brasil
Brazil	77	Tony Kanaan	Indycar Series
Brazil	80	Marcos Gomes	Stock Car Brasil/Trofeo Linea Brasil
Brazil	90	Pietro Fittipaldi	Whelen All-American Series
Brazil	99	Xandinho Negrão	Stock Car Brasil/GT Brasil
Germany	7	Adrian Sutil	Formula One
France	5	Jules Bianchi	GP2 Series/GP2 Asia Series
Italy	23	Vitantonio Liuzzi	Formula One
Italy	45	Gianni Morbidelli	Superstars Series
Spain	17	Jaime Alguersuari	Formula One
Venezuela	12	Pastor Maldonado	Formula One

== Classification ==
=== Qualifying ===
Pos	No	Country	Driver	Time
Top Qualifying
1	23	Italy	Vitantonio Liuzzi	55.498
2	5	France	Jules Bianchi	55.779
3	8	Brazil	Nelson Piquet Jr.	55.845
4	19	Brazil	Felipe Massa	56.017
5	17	Spain	Jaime Alguersuari	56.041
6	3	Brazil	Antônio Pizzonia	56.089
7	10	Brazil	Ricardo Zonta	56.206
8	90	Brazil	Pietro Fittipaldi	56.310
9	18	Brazil	Allam Khodair	56.372
10	21	Brazil	Leonardo Nienkotter	56.399
Top Qualifying cutoff
11	12	Venezuela	Pastor Maldonado	55:745
12	65	Brazil	Max Wilson	55:790
13	64	Belgium	Jérôme d'Ambrosio	55:810
14	9	Brazil	Lucas di Grassi	55:843
15	0	Brazil	Cacá Bueno	55:872
16	14	Brazil	Luciano Burti	55:886
17	33	Brazil	Bia Figueiredo	55:889
18	16	Brazil	Enrique Bernoldi	55:893
19	1	Brazil	Christian Fittipaldi	55:906
20	80	Brazil	Marcos Gomes	55:912
21	34	Brazil	Hélio Castroneves	55:915
22	27	Brazil	Vítor Meira	55:930
23	77	Brazil	Tony Kanaan	55:957
24	11	Brazil	Rubens Barrichello	55:958
25	7	Germany	Adrian Sutil	55:999
26	99	Brazil	Xandinho Negrão	56:100
27	74	Brazil	Popó Bueno	56:427
28	25	Brazil	Tuka Rocha	56:511
29	45	Italy	Gianni Morbidelli	56:669
Pole Position wins 2 points

=== Race 1 ===
Pos	No	Country	Driver	Laps	Time/Retired	Grid	Points
1	5	France	Jules Bianchi	25	26:17.395	2	25
2	17	Spain	Jaime Alguersuari	25	+7.487	5	20
3	19	Brazil	Felipe Massa	25	+7.538	4	16
4	8	Brazil	Nelson Piquet Jr.	25	+20.280	3	13
5	3	Brazil	Antônio Pizzonia	25	+21.062	6	11
6	11	Brazil	Rubens Barrichello	25	+22.529	24	10
7	64	Belgium	Jérôme d'Ambrosio	25	+25.620	13	9
8	9	Brazil	Lucas di Grassi	25	+29.376	14	8
9	18	Brazil	Allam Khodair	25	+29.788	9	7
10	14	Brazil	Luciano Burti	25	+35.827	16	6
11	23	Italy	Vitantonio Liuzzi	25	+38.301	1	5+2
12	10	Brazil	Ricardo Zonta	25	+38.406	7	4
13	77	Brazil	Tony Kanaan	25	+38.982	23	3
14	0	Brazil	Cacá Bueno	25	+39.209	15	2
15	99	Brazil	Xandinho Negrão	25	+39.292	26	1
16	27	Brazil	Vítor Meira	25	+40.254	22	
17	33	Brazil	Bia Figueiredo	25	+40.308	17	
18	7	Germany	Adrian Sutil	25	+42.598	25	
19	21	Brazil	Leonardo Nienkotter	25	+43.513	10	
20	34	Brazil	Hélio Castroneves	25	+43.584	21	
21	16	Brazil	Enrique Bernoldi	25	+47.417	18	
22	65	Brazil	Max Wilson	25	+47.730	12	
23	12	Venezuela	Pastor Maldonado	23	+2 laps	11	
24	1	Brazil	Christian Fittipaldi	22	+3 laps	19	
25	90	Brazil	Pietro Fittipaldi	22	+3 laps	8	
26	25	Brazil	Tuka Rocha	20	+5 laps	28	
Ret	74	Brazil	Popó Bueno	9	Retired	27	
Ret	80	Brazil	Marcos Gomes	3	Retired	20	
DSQ	45	Italy	Gianni Morbidelli	33	Disqualified	29	
Fastest lap: Allam Khodair, 59:914

=== Race 2 ===
Pos	No	Country	Driver	Laps	Time/Retired	Grid	Points
1	17	Spain	Jaime Alguersuari	33	31:30:458	7	25
2	9	Brazil	Lucas di Grassi	33	+5.211	1	20
3	11	Brazil	Rubens Barrichello	33	+5.353	3	16
4	19	Brazil	Felipe Massa	33	+5.946	6	13
5	64	Belgium	Jérôme d'Ambrosio	33	+6.515	2	11
6	3	Brazil	Antônio Pizzonia	33	+6.997	4	10
7	10	Brazil	Ricardo Zonta	33	+11.371	12	9
8	14	Brazil	Luciano Burti	33	+14.500	10	8
9	80	Brazil	Marcos Gomes	33	+14.791	28	7
10	34	Brazil	Hélio Castroneves	33	+18.226	20	6
11	23	Italy	Vitantonio Liuzzi	33	+18.720	11	5
12	0	Brazil	Cacá Bueno	33	+31.409	14	2
13	16	Brazil	Enrique Bernoldi	33	+31.641	21	3
14	45	Italy	Gianni Morbidelli	33	+39.020	29	2
15	90	Brazil	Pietro Fittipaldi	33	+46.142	25	1
16	18	Brazil	Allam Khodair	29	+4 laps	9	
Ret	74	Brazil	Popó Bueno	22	Retired	27	
Ret	65	Brazil	Max Wilson	20	Retired	22	
Ret	7	Germany	Adrian Sutil	19	Retired	18	
Ret	77	Brazil	Tony Kanaan	17	Retired	13	
Ret	1	Brazil	Christian Fittipaldi	12	Retired	24	
Ret	25	Brazil	Tuka Rocha	9	Retired	26	
Ret	99	Brazil	Xandinho Negrão	2	Retired	15	
Ret	12	Venezuela	Pastor Maldonado	0	Retired	23	
DSQ	5	France	Jules Bianchi	33	Disqualified	8	
DSQ	8	Brazil	Nelson Piquet Jr.	33	Disqualified	5	
DSQ	27	Brazil	Vítor Meira	33	Disqualified	16	
DSQ	21	Brazil	Leonardo Nienkotter	33	Disqualified	19	
DSQ	33	Brazil	Bia Figueiredo	33	Disqualified	17	
Fastest lap: Jaime Alguersuari, 55:786

=== Final Classification ===
Pos	No	Country	Driver	Race 1	Race 2	Total
1	17	Spain	Jaime Alguersuari	20	25	45
2	19	Brazil	Felipe Massa	16	13	29
3	9	Brazil	Lucas di Grassi	8	20	28
4	11	Brazil	Rubens Barrichello	10	16	26
5	5	France	Jules Bianchi	25		25
6	3	Brazil	Antônio Pizzonia	11	10	21
7	64	Belgium	Jérôme d'Ambrosio	9	11	20
8	14	Brazil	Luciano Burti	6	8	14
9	8	Brazil	Nelson Piquet Jr.	13		13
10	10	Brazil	Ricardo Zonta	4	9	13
11	23	Italy	Vitantonio Liuzzi	7	5	12
12	18	Brazil	Allam Khodair	7		7
13	80	Brazil	Marcos Gomes		7	7
14	0	Brazil	Cacá Bueno	2	4	6
15	34	Brazil	Hélio Castroneves		6	6
16	77	Brazil	Tony Kanaan	3	0	3
17	16	Brazil	Enrique Bernoldi	0	3	3
18	45	Italy	Gianni Morbidelli	0	2	2
19	99	Brazil	Xandinho Negrão	1		1
20	90	Brazil	Pietro Fittipaldi		1	1
	27	Brazil	Vítor Meira			
	33	Brazil	Bia Figueiredo			
	7	Germany	Adrian Sutil			
	21	Brazil	Leonardo Nienkotter			
	65	Brazil	Max Wilson			
	11	Venezuela	Pastor Maldonado			
	1	Brazil	Christian Fittipaldi			
	25	Brazil	Tuka Rocha			
	74	Brazil	Popó Bueno			
Result of race 1 is the tiebreaker
