= 2008 Desafio Internacional das Estrelas =

Seasons
- ← 2007 2009 →

2008 Desafio Internacional das Estrelas was the fourth edition of Desafio Internacional das Estrelas (International Challenge of the Stars) held on 2 December 2008. The event consisted of warmup, qualifying and race sessions with the overall winner determined by the aggregate points score from the two races. The ten fastest qualifiers took part in the top ten shootout for the pole which was won by Lucas di Grassi. The qualifying rounds set the grid for the first race which was won by Rubens Barrichello. The starting grid of the second race was determined by the results of the first race although the top eight of the first race were reversed. The second race also provided less points than the first. It was won by Felipe Massa. Overall winner of the event was Rubens Barrichello as he scored the most points ahead of Lucas di Grassi and Felipe Massa.

== Qualifying ==
Pos	No	Driver	Lap Time	Grid
1	18	(Brazil) Lucas di Grassi	42.592	1
2	20	(Italy) Vitantonio Liuzzi	42.707	2
3	11	(Brazil) Rubens Barrichello	42.809	3
4	1	(Germany) Michael Schumacher	43.222	4
5	21	(Brazil) Thiago Camilo	43.342	5
6	3	(Brazil) Antônio Pizzonia	45.090	6
7	16	(Brazil) Allam Khodair	45.162	7
8	42	(Brazil) Ricardo Zonta	45.535	8
9	65	(Brazil) Max Wilson	46.290	9
10	80	(Brazil) Marcos Gomes	46.942	10
11	14	(Brazil) Luciano Burti	41.978	11
12	19	(Brazil) Felipe Massa	42.010	12
13	15	(Brazil) Felipe Giaffone	42.276	13
14	9	(Brazil) Xandinho Negrão	42.377	14
15	17	(Brazil) João Paulo de Oliveira	42.425	15
16	74	(Brazil) Popó Bueno	42.482	16
17	27	(Brazil) Vítor Meira	42.518	17
18	4	(Brazil) Alexandre Barros	42.552	18
19	25	(Italy) Luca Badoer	42.555	19
20	6	(Brazil) Tony Kanaan	42.618	20
21	77	(Brazil) Tarso Marques	42.637	21
22	90	(Brazil) Ricardo Maurício	42.748	22
23	2	(Brazil) Mario Moraes	42.775	23
24	99	(Brazil) Roberto Moreno	43.055	24
25	24	(United States) Jeff Gordon	43.148	25
26	8	(Brazil) Luís Tedesco	44.348	26

== Race 1 ==
Pos	No	Driver	Laps	Time/Retired	Grid	Points
1	11	(Brazil) Rubens Barrichello	34	24:25.119	3	25
2	18	(Brazil) Lucas di Grassi	34	+1.211	1	20
3	21	(Brazil) Thiago Camilo	34	+5.722	5	16
4	1	(Germany) Michael Schumacher	34	+15.332	4	13
5	19	(Brazil) Felipe Massa	34	+20.996	12	11
6	16	(Brazil) Allam Khodair	34	+23.177	7	10
7	15	(Brazil) Felipe Giaffone	34	+23.522	13	9
8	9	(Brazil) Xandinho Negrão	34	+28.826	14	8
9	42	(Brazil) Ricardo Zonta	34	+40.205	8	7
10	65	(Brazil) Max Wilson	34	+51.060	9	6
11	6	(Brazil) Tony Kanaan	33	+ 1 lap	20	5
12	14	(Brazil) Luciano Burti	33	+ 1 lap	11	4
13	4	(Brazil) Alexandre Barros	33	+ 1 lap	18	3
14	99	(Brazil) Roberto Moreno	33	+ 1 lap	24	2
15	17	(Brazil) João Paulo de Oliveira	32	+2 laps	15	1
16	74	(Brazil) Popó Bueno	32	+2 laps	16	
17	8	(Brazil) Luís Tedesco	31	+3 laps	26	
18	80	(Brazil) Marcos Gomes	27	+7 laps	10	
19	27	(Brazil) Vítor Meira	26	+8 laps	17	
20	25	(Italy) Luca Badoer	26	+8 laps	19	
21	20	(Italy) Vitantonio Liuzzi	24	+10 laps	2	
22	24	(United States) Jeff Gordon	24	+10 laps	25	
23	3	(Brazil) Antônio Pizzonia	22	+12 laps	6	
24	77	(Brazil) Tarso Marques	21	+13 laps	21	
25	90	(Brazil) Ricardo Maurício	17	+17 laps	22	
26	2	(Brazil) Mario Moraes	1	+33 laps	23	

- Race 1 winner Rubens Barrichello's average speed was 83.70 km/h.
- Race 1 fastest lap was by Michael Schumacher 41.537s

== Race 2 ==
Pos	No	Driver	Laps	Time/Retired	Grid	Points
1	19	(Brazil) Felipe Massa	37	24:25.119	4	20
2	15	(Brazil) Felipe Giaffone	37	+1.211	2	17
3	18	(Brazil) Lucas di Grassi	37	+5.722	7	15
4	9	(Brazil) Xandinho Negrão	37	+15.332	1	13
5	11	(Brazil) Rubens Barrichello	37	+20.996	8	11
6	65	(Brazil) Max Wilson	37	+23.177	10	10
7	3	(Brazil) Antônio Pizzonia	37	+23.522	23	9
8	17	(Brazil) João Paulo de Oliveira	37	+28.826	15	8
9	77	(Brazil) Tarso Marques	37	+40.205	24	7
10	74	(Brazil) Popó Bueno	37	+51.060	16	6
11	2	(Brazil) Mario Moraes	36	+1 lap	26	5
12	27	(Brazil) Vítor Meira	36	+1 lap	19	4
13	74	(Brazil) Popó Bueno	36	+1 lap	16	3
14	21	(Brazil) Thiago Camilo	35	+2 laps	6	2
15	42	(Brazil) Ricardo Zonta	35	+2 laps	9	1
16	80	(Brazil) Marcos Gomes	34	+3 laps	18	
17	8	(Brazil) Luís Tedesco	33	+4 laps	17	
18	14	(Brazil) Luciano Burti	33	+4 laps	12	
19	6	(Brazil) Tony Kanaan	28	+9 laps	11	
20	4	(Brazil) Alexandre Barros	24	+13 laps	13	
21	16	(Brazil) Allam Khodair	19	+18 laps	3	
22	24	(United States) Jeff Gordon	17	+20 laps	22	
23	1	(Germany) Michael Schumacher	11	+26 laps	5	
24	90	(Brazil) Ricardo Maurício	8	+29 laps	25	
25	25	(Italy) Luca Badoer	6	+31 laps	20	
26	20	(Italy) Vitantonio Liuzzi			21	

- Race 2 winner Felipe Massa's average speed was 84.97 km/h.
- Race 2 fastest lap was by Rubens Barrichello 41.650s

== Final classification ==
Pos	No	Driver	Race 1 points	Race 2 points	Total points
1	11	(Brazil) Rubens Barrichello	25	11	36
2	18	(Brazil) Lucas di Grassi	20	15	35
3	19	(Brazil) Felipe Massa	11	20	31
4	15	(Brazil) Felipe Giaffone	9	17	26
5	9	(Brazil) Xandinho Negrão	8	13	21
6	21	(Brazil) Thiago Camilo	16	2	18
7	65	(Brazil) Max Wilson	6	10	16
8	1	(Germany) Michael Schumacher	13		13
9	16	(Brazil) Allam Khodair	10		10
10	3	(Brazil) Antônio Pizzonia		9	9
11	17	(Brazil) João Paulo de Oliveira	1	8	9
12	42	(Brazil) Ricardo Zonta	7	1	8
13	77	(Brazil) Tarso Marques		7	7
14	74	(Brazil) Popó Bueno		6	6
15	6	(Brazil) Tony Kanaan	5		5
16	2	(Brazil) Mario Moraes	2	3	5
17	99	(Brazil) Roberto Moreno	4		4
18	14	(Brazil) Luciano Burti		4	4
19	27	(Brazil) Vítor Meira	3		3
20	4	(Brazil) Alexandre Barros			0
21	8	(Brazil) Luís Tedesco			0
22	80	(Brazil) Marcos Gomes			0
23	25	(Italy) Luca Badoer			0
24	20	(Italy) Vitantonio Liuzzi			0
25	24	(United States) Jeff Gordon			0
26	90	(Brazil) Ricardo Maurício			0
