= 2006 Desafio Internacional das Estrelas =

Seasons
- ← 2005 2007 →

2006 Desafio Internacional das Estrelas was the second edition of Desafio Internacional das Estrelas (International Challenge of the Stars) held in two heats with Felipe Massa winning the first one and Antônio Pizzonia winning the second one. Overall winner was Felipe Massa.

== Qualifying ==
Pos.	Driver	Q1	Q2
1	(São Paulo (state)) Felipe Massa	41.417	41.619
2	(Amazonas (Brazilian state)) Antônio Pizzonia	41.629	41.793
3	(Federal District (Brazil)) Nelson Piquet Jr.	41.561	41.793
4	(São Paulo (state)) Lucas di Grassi	41.614	41.801
5	(São Paulo (state)) Luciano Burti	41.496	42.008
6	(Paraná (state)) Enrique Bernoldi	41.790	42.274
7	(São Paulo (state)) Felipe Giaffone	41.794	42.282
8	(São Paulo (state)) Marcos Gomes	41.721	42.322
9	(Italy) Vitantonio Liuzzi	41.809	42.345
10	(Federal District (Brazil)) Vítor Meira	41.810	42.391
11	(Paraná (state)) Ricardo Zonta	41.831	
12	(São Paulo (state)) João Paulo de Oliveira	41.846	
13	(Bahia) Tony Kanaan	41.857	
14	(São Paulo (state)) Alexandre Barros	42.002	
15	(São Paulo (state)) Xandynho Negrão	42.048	
16	(Rio de Janeiro (state)) Popó Bueno	42.108	
17	(Netherlands) Robert Doornbos	42.157	
18	(Mato Grosso do Sul) Hoover Orsi	42.205	
19	(São Paulo (state)) Giuliano Losacco	42.224	
20	(Goiás) Jaime Camara	42.351	
21	(Rio de Janeiro (state)) Cacá Bueno	42.397	
22	(São Paulo (state)) Rubens Barrichello	42.407	
23	(Paraná (state)) Tarso Marques	42.428	
24	(Portugal) Tiago Monteiro	42.476	
25	(France) Jean Alesi	43.052	

== Race 1 results ==
Pos	No.	Driver	Laps	Time/Retired	Grid	Points
1	19	(Brazil) Felipe Massa	30	20:52.035		
2	33	(Brazil) Nelsinho Piquet	30	+0.739		
3	91	(Brazil) Lucas di Grassi	30	+10.873		
4	91	(Brazil) Enrique Bernoldi	30	+11.860		
5	27	(Brazil) Vítor Meira	30	+11.975		
6	3	(Brazil) Antônio Pizzonia	30	+14.521		
7	14	(Brazil) Luciano Burti	30	+15.220		
8	6	(Brazil) Tony Kanaan	30	+17.616		
9	5	(Brazil) Hoover Orsi	30	+27.235		
10	0	(Brazil) Cacá Bueno	30	+34.176		
11	18	(Portugal) Tiago Monteiro	30	+36.327		
12	17	(Brazil) João Paulo de Oliveira	30	+39.679		
13	18	(Brazil) Xandynho Negrão	29	+1 Lap		
14	10	(France) Jean Alesi	29	+1 Lap		
15	20	(Italy) Vitantonio Liuzzi	29	+1 Lap		
16	11	(Brazil) Rubens Barrichello	24	+6 Laps		
17	21	(Brazil) Marcos Gomes	23	+7 Laps		
18	74	(Brazil) Popó Bueno	23	+7 Laps		
19	77	(Brazil) Jaime Camara	20	+10 Laps		
20	74	(Brazil) Tarso Marques	20	+10 Laps		
21	4	(Brazil) Alex Barros	17	+13 Laps		
22	9	(Brazil) Giuliano Losacco	12	+18 Laps		
23	2	(Brazil) Ricardo Zonta	8	+22 Laps		
24	15	(Brazil) Felipe Giaffone	2	+28 Laps		

== Race 2 results ==
- 1º) Antônio Pizzonia
- 2º) Nelsinho Piquet
- 3º) Lucas di Grassi
- 4º) Felipe Massa
- 5º) Tony Kanaan
- 6º) Vitantonio Liuzzi
- 7º) Enrique Bernoldi
- 8º) Rubens Barrichello

== Final classification ==
Rank	Driver	R1	R2	Pts
1	(São Paulo (state)) Felipe Massa	1	4	38
2	(Federal District (Brazil)) Nelson Piquet Jr.	2	2	37
3	(São Paulo (state)) Lucas di Grassi	3	3	31
4	(Amazonas (Brazilian state)) Antônio Pizzonia	6	1	30
5	(Paraná (state)) Enrique Bernoldi	4	7	22
6	(Bahia) Tony Kanaan	8	5	19
7	(Federal District (Brazil)) Vítor Meira	5	15	12
8	(Italy) Vitantonio Liuzzi	15	6	11
9	(São Paulo (state)) João Paulo de Oliveira	12	10	10
10	(São Paulo (state)) Luciano Burti	7	18	9
11	(São Paulo (state)) Rubens Barrichello	16	8	8
12	(Mato Grosso do Sul) Hoover Orsi	9	NC	7
13	(São Paulo (state)) Felipe Giaffone	NC	9	7
14	(Rio de Janeiro (state)) Cacá Bueno	10	NC	6
15	(Portugal) Tiago Monteiro	11	19	5
16	(Rio de Janeiro (state)) Popó Bueno	18	11	5
17	(Paraná (state)) Ricardo Zonta	NC	12	4
18	(São Paulo (state)) Xandinho Negrão	13	NC	3
19	(Netherlands) Robert Doornbos	NC	13	3
20	(France) Jean Alesi	14	17	2
21	(São Paulo (state)) Alexandre Barros	NC	14	2
22	(São Paulo (state)) Marcos Gomes	17	16	0
23	(Goiás) Jaime Camara	NC	NC	0
24	(Paraná (state)) Tarso Marques	NC	NC	0
25	(São Paulo (state)) Giuliano Losacco	NC	NC	0
