= 2009 Desafio Internacional das Estrelas =

Seasons
- ← 2008 2010 →

2009 Desafio Internacional das Estrelas was the fifth edition of Desafio Internacional das Estrelas (International Challenge of the Stars) with Rubens Barrichello as the defending champion. The races were held on a newly built track that had been designed by race participant Lucas di Grassi. The event was won by Michael Schumacher after he won Race 1 and came 2nd in Race 2.

== Qualifying – Top 10 Shootout ==
Pos	No	Driver	Lap Time	Grid
1	50	(Brazil) Nelson Piquet Jr.	57.043	1
2	27	(Brazil) Vítor Meira	57.063	2
3	18	(Brazil) Lucas di Grassi	57.135	3
4	3	(Brazil) Antônio Pizzonia	57.145	4
5	20	(Italy) Vitantonio Liuzzi	57.232	5
6	1	(Germany) Michael Schumacher	57.237	6
7	11	(Brazil) Rubens Barrichello	57.293	7
8	17	(Brazil) João Paulo de Oliveira	57.384	8
9	6	(Brazil) Tony Kanaan	57.566	9
10	60	(Brazil) Raphael Matos	57.835	10

== Race 1 ==
Pos	No	Driver	Laps	Time/Retired	Grid	Points
1	1	(Germany) Michael Schumacher	28	26:28.571	6	25
2	20	(Italy) Vitantonio Liuzzi	28	+2.768	5	20
3	19	(Brazil) Felipe Massa	28	+4.684	12	16
4	18	(Brazil) Lucas di Grassi	28	+5.553	3	13
5	27	(Brazil) Vítor Meira	28	+6.727	2	11
6	11	(Brazil) Rubens Barrichello	28	+7.989	7	10
7	6	(Brazil) Tony Kanaan	28	+8.288	9	9
8	3	(Brazil) Antônio Pizzonia	28	+8.423	4	8
9	50	(Brazil) Nelson Piquet Jr.	28	+16.237	1	7
10	23	(Brazil) Duda Pamplona	28	+17.775	?	6
11	10	(Brazil) Ricardo Zonta	28	+26.208	25	5
12	77	(Brazil) Tarso Marques	28	+26.671	?	4
13	16	(Brazil) Enrique Bernoldi	28	+27.088	?	3
14	5	(Brazil) Mario Moraes	28	+27.447	?	2
15	17	(Brazil) João Paulo de Oliveira	28	+29.485	8	1
16	74	(Brazil) Popó Bueno	28	+30.511	?	
17	14	(Brazil) Luciano Burti	28	+33.342	?	
18	15	(Brazil) Felipe Giaffone	28	+38.662	?	
19	21	(Brazil) Bia Figueiredo	28	+39.039	15	
20	8	(Brazil) Eduardo Berlanda	28	+50.544	?	
21	99	(Brazil) Xandinho Negrão	27	+1 lap	14	
22	80	(Brazil) Marcos Gomes	10	+8 laps	13	
23	60	(Brazil) Raphael Matos	3	+25 laps	10	
24	7	(Brazil) Christian Fittipaldi	3	+25 laps	11	
25	65	(Brazil) Max Wilson	1	+27 laps	?	

- Race 1 winner Michael Schumacher's average speed was 76.58 km/h.
- Race 1 fastest lap was by Michael Schumacher 55.841s (77.81 km/h)

== Race 2 ==
Pos	No	Driver	Laps	Time/Retired	Grid	Points
1	19	(Brazil) Felipe Massa	28	26:08.980	6	20
2	1	(Germany) Michael Schumacher	28	+0.087	8	17
3	27	(Brazil) Vítor Meira	28	+1.301	4	15
4	11	(Brazil) Rubens Barrichello	28	+1.915	3	13
5	80	(Brazil) Marcos Gomes	28	+0.038	22	11
6	6	(Brazil) Tony Kanaan	28	+2.883	2	10
7	65	(Brazil) Max Wilson	28	+5.159	25	9
8	7	(Brazil) Christian Fittipaldi	28	+9.812	24	8
9	60	(Brazil) Raphael Matos	28	+19.961	23	7
10	21	(Brazil) Bia Figueiredo	28	+20.031	19	6
11	20	(Italy) Vitantonio Liuzzi	28	+20.804	7	5
12	16	(Brazil) Enrique Bernoldi	28	+21.252	13	4
13	17	(Brazil) João Paulo de Oliveira	28	+21.474	15	3
14	99	(Brazil) Xandinho Negrão	28	+21.864	21	2
15	14	(Brazil) Luciano Burti	28	+22.878	17	1
16	77	(Brazil) Tarso Marques	28	+24.646	12	
17	74	(Brazil) Popó Bueno	28	+25.471	16	
18	8	(Brazil) Eduardo Berlanda	28	+37.944	20	
19	3	(Brazil) Antônio Pizzonia	27	+1 lap	1	
20	23	(Brazil) Duda Pamplona	27	+1 lap	10	
21	50	(Brazil) Nelson Piquet Jr.	19	+9 laps	9	
22	18	(Brazil) Lucas di Grassi	16	+12 laps	5	
23	5	(Brazil) Mario Moraes	7	+21 laps	14	
24	10	(Brazil) Ricardo Zonta	2	+26 laps	11	
25	15	(Brazil) Felipe Giaffone	2	+26 laps	18	

- Race 2 winner Felipe Massa's average speed was 77.89 km/h.
- Race 2 fastest lap was by Michael Schumacher 55.461s (78.34 km/h)

== Final classification ==
Pos	No	Driver	Race 1 points	Race 2 points	Total points
1	1	(Germany) Michael Schumacher	25	17	42
2	19	(Brazil) Felipe Massa	16	20	36
3	27	(Brazil) Vítor Meira	11	15	26
4	20	(Italy) Vitantonio Liuzzi	20	5	25
5	11	(Brazil) Rubens Barrichello	10	13	23
6	6	(Brazil) Tony Kanaan	9	10	19
7	18	(Brazil) Lucas di Grassi	13		13
8	80	(Brazil) Marcos Gomes		11	11
9	65	(Brazil) Max Wilson		9	9
10	7	(Brazil) Christian Fittipaldi		8	8
11	3	(Brazil) Antônio Pizzonia	8		8
12	60	(Brazil) Raphael Matos		7	7
13	50	(Brazil) Nelson Piquet Jr.	7		7
14	16	(Brazil) Enrique Bernoldi	3	4	7
15	21	(Brazil) Bia Figueiredo		6	6
16	23	(Brazil) Duda Pamplona	6		6
17	10	(Brazil) Ricardo Zonta	5		5
18	17	(Brazil) João Paulo de Oliveira	1	3	4
19	77	(Brazil) Tarso Marques	4		4
20	99	(Brazil) Xandinho Negrão		2	2
21	5	(Brazil) Mario Moraes	2		2
22	14	(Brazil) Luciano Burti		1	1
23	74	(Brazil) Popó Bueno			
24	15	(Brazil) Felipe Giaffone			
25	8	(Brazil) Eduardo Berlanda			
