= 2007 Desafio Internacional das Estrelas =

Seasons
- ← 2006 2008 →

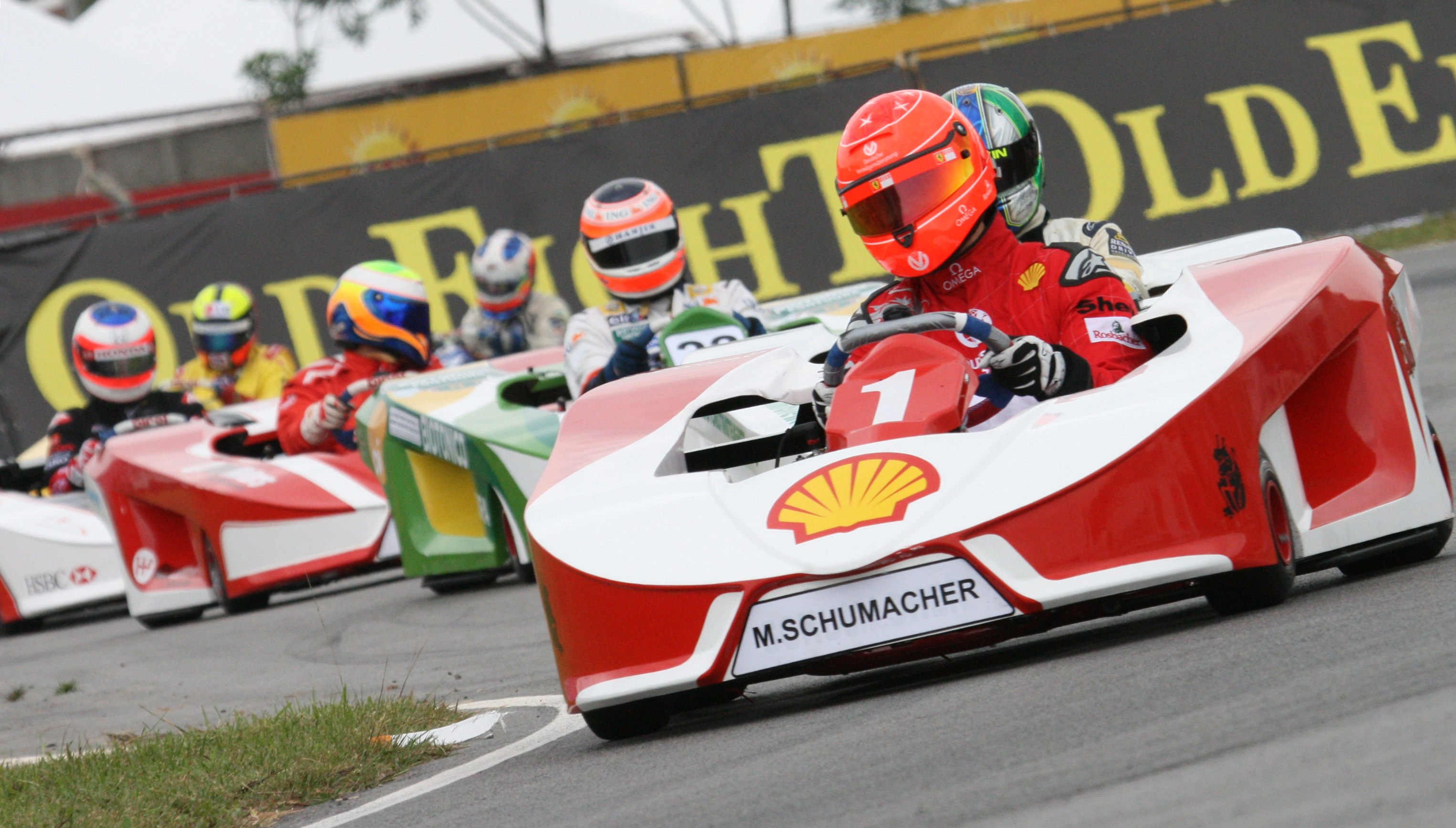
Michael Schumacher won the 2007 race.

2007 Desafio Internacional das Estrelas was the third edition of Desafio Internacional das Estrelas (International Challenge of the Stars) held on November 23 – November 25, 2007. It was won by Michael Schumacher.

In the qualification for the race Nelson Piquet Jr. took pole position. The event had two races with points gathered from both races, although the second race gave less points. The first eight finishers from the first race were then reversed for the start of the second race with the rest starting the second race as they were classified in the first race. Race one winner was Michael Schumacher and the second race was won by Lucas di Grassi. After the two races Michael Schumacher had gathered the most points (35) ahead of Luciano Burti (33 points) and Lucas di Grassi (31 points). Thus, he was declared the champion in his first participation of the event.

== Qualifying ==
Pos	No	Name	Lap time	Grid
1	33	(Brazil) Nelson Piquet Jr.	41.856	1
2	18	(Brazil) Lucas di Grassi	41.972	2
3	19	(Brazil) Felipe Massa	41.999	3
4	1	(Germany) Michael Schumacher	42.058	4
5	14	(Brazil) Luciano Burti	42.245	5
6	15	(Brazil) Felipe Giaffone	42.330	6
7	11	(Brazil) Rubens Barrichello	42.361	7
8	90	(Brazil) Xandinho Negrão	42.417	8
9	80	(Brazil) Marcos Gomes	42.773	9
10	21	(Brazil) Thiago Camilo	43.122	10
11	3	(Brazil) Antônio Pizzonia	41.630	11
12	27	(Brazil) Vítor Meira	41.683	12
13	2	(Brazil) Ricardo Zonta	41.742	13
14	16	(Brazil) Enrique Bernoldi	41.801	14
15	6	(Brazil) Tony Kanaan	41.847	15
16	4	(Brazil) Alexandre Barros	41.874	16
17	25	(Italy) Luca Badoer	41.991	17
18	9	(Brazil) Ricardo Maurício	42.006	18
19	20	(Brazil) Rodrigo Sperafico	42.028	19
20	77	(Brazil) Tarso Marques	42.190	20
21	74	(Brazil) Popó Bueno	42.357	21
22	0	(Brazil) Cacá Bueno	42.360	22
23	99	(Brazil) Roberto Moreno	42.415	23
24	42	(Brazil) Gil de Ferran	42.612	24

== Race 1 ==
Pos	No	Driver	Laps	Time/Retired	Grid	Points
1	1	(Germany) Michael Schumacher	32	21:59.406	4	25
2	33	(Brazil) Nelson Piquet Jr.	32	+5.687	1	20
3	14	(Brazil) Luciano Burti	32	+5.737	5	16
4	11	(Brazil) Rubens Barrichello	32	+8.147	7	13
5	18	(Brazil) Lucas di Grassi	32	+8.218	2	11
6	80	(Brazil) Marcos Gomes	32	+9.090	9	10
7	19	(Brazil) Felipe Massa	32	+16.328	3	9
8	21	(Brazil) Thiago Camilo	32	+16.548	10	8
9	2	(Brazil) Ricardo Zonta	32	+18.736	13	7
10	6	(Brazil) Tony Kanaan	32	+19.107	15	6
11	16	(Brazil) Enrique Bernoldi	32	+22.220	14	5
12	27	(Brazil) Vítor Meira	32	+22.616	12	4
13	9	(Brazil) Ricardo Maurício	32	+29.499	18	3
14	0	(Brazil) Cacá Bueno	32	+34.065	22	2
15	74	(Brazil) Popó Bueno	32	+34.252	21	1
16	77	(Brazil) Tarso Marques	32	+36.523	20	
17	99	(Brazil) Roberto Moreno	32	+36.703	23	
18	90	(Brazil) Xandinho Negrão	31	+1 lap	8	
19	42	(Brazil) Gil de Ferran	31	+1 lap	24	
20	3	(Brazil) Antônio Pizzonia	22	+10 laps	11	
21	15	(Brazil) Felipe Giaffone	22	+10 laps	6	
22	20	(Brazil) Rodrigo Sperafico	20	+12 laps	19	
23	4	(Brazil) Alexandre Barros	1	+31 laps	16	

- Race 1 winner Michael Schumacher's average speed was 90.62 km/h.
- Race 1 fastest lap was by Rubens Barrichello 40.681s

== Race 2 ==
Pos	No	Driver	Laps	Time/Retired	Grid	Points
1	18	(Brazil) Lucas di Grassi	32	22:12.328	4	20
2	14	(Brazil) Luciano Burti	32	+3.506	6	17
3	19	(Brazil) Felipe Massa	32	+4.579	2	15
4	11	(Brazil) Rubens Barrichello	32	+4.775	5	13
5	80	(Brazil) Marcos Gomes	32	+6.674	3	11
6	1	(Germany) Michael Schumacher	32	+7.087	8	10
7	15	(Brazil) Felipe Giaffone	32	+7.273	21	9
8	3	(Brazil) Antônio Pizzonia	32	+11.157	20	8
9	6	(Brazil) Tony Kanaan	32	+16.198	10	7
10	27	(Brazil) Vítor Meira	32	+21.943	12	6
11	16	(Brazil) Enrique Bernoldi	32	+23.248	11	5
12	20	(Brazil) Rodrigo Sperafico	32	+24.042	22	4
13	2	(Brazil) Ricardo Zonta	32	+29.616	9	3
14	99	(Brazil) Roberto Moreno	32	+30.973	17	2
15	25	(Italy) Luca Badoer	32	+31.273	24	1
16	74	(Brazil) Popó Bueno	32	+31.416	15	
17	33	(Brazil) Nelson Piquet Jr.	31	+1 lap	2	
18	9	(Brazil) Ricardo Maurício	31	+1 lap	13	
19	77	(Brazil) Tarso Marques	31	+1 lap	16	
20	21	(Brazil) Thiago Camilo	30	+2 laps	1	
21	0	(Brazil) Cacá Bueno	20	+12 laps	14	
22	4	(Brazil) Alexandre Barros	19	+13 laps	23	
23	42	(Brazil) Gil de Ferran	18	+14 laps	19	
24	90	(Brazil) Xandinho Negrão	9	+23 laps	18	

- Race 2 winner Lucas di Grassi's average speed was 89.75 km/h.
- Race 2 fastest lap was by Michael Schumacher 40.956s

== Final classification ==
Pos	No	Driver	Race 1 points	Race 2 points	Total points
1	1	(Germany) Michael Schumacher	25	10	35
2	14	(Brazil) Luciano Burti	16	17	33
3	18	(Brazil) Lucas di Grassi	11	20	31
4	11	(Brazil) Rubens Barrichello	13	13	26
5	19	(Brazil) Felipe Massa	9	15	24
6	80	(Brazil) Marcos Gomes	10	11	21
7	33	(Brazil) Nelson Piquet Jr.	20	0	20
8	6	(Brazil) Tony Kanaan	6	7	13
9	2	(Brazil) Ricardo Zonta	7	3	10
10	16	(Brazil) Enrique Bernoldi	5	5	10
11	27	(Brazil) Vítor Meira	4	6	10
12	15	(Brazil) Felipe Giaffone		9	9
13	21	(Brazil) Thiago Camilo	8		8
14	3	(Brazil) Antônio Pizzonia		8	8
15	20	(Brazil) Rodrigo Sperafico		4	4
16	9	(Brazil) Ricardo Maurício	3		3
17	0	(Brazil) Cacá Bueno	2		2
18	99	(Brazil) Roberto Moreno		2	2
19	74	(Brazil) Popó Bueno	1		1
20	25	(Italy) Luca Badoer		1	1
21	77	(Brazil) Tarso Marques			0
22	90	(Brazil) Xandinho Negrão			0
23	42	(Brazil) Gil de Ferran			0
24	4	(Brazil) Alexandre Barros			0
