= 2010 Desafio Internacional das Estrelas =

Seasons
- ← 2009 2011 →

2010 Desafio Internacional das Estrelas was the sixth edition of Desafio Internacional das Estrelas (International Challenge of the Stars) with Michael Schumacher not defending his title. Races scheduled for 18–19 December at Arena Sapiens Park in Florianópolis-SC. The event was won by Lucas di Grassi after he won Race 1 and retired in Race 2.

== Participants ==
| Country | | Drivers | Notes |
|---|---|---|---|
| Brazil | 0 | Cacá Bueno | |
| Brazil | 1 | Christian Fittipaldi | |
| Brazil | 3 | Antônio Pizzonia | |
| Brazil | 6 | Tony Kanaan | |
| Brazil | 7 | Leonardo Nienkotter | |
| Brazil | 9 | Lucas di Grassi | |
| Brazil | 10 | Ricardo Zonta | |
| Brazil | 11 | Rubens Barrichello | |
| Brazil | 12 | Bruno Senna | |
| Brazil | 14 | Luciano Burti | |
| Brazil | 15 | Felipe Giaffone | |
| Brazil | 16 | Enrique Bernoldi | |
| Brazil | 18 | Allam Khodair | |
| Brazil | 19 | Felipe Massa | |
| Brazil | 21 | Thiago Camilo | |
| Brazil | 23 | João Paulo Oliveira | |
| Brazil | 27 | Vítor Meira | |
| Brazil | 33 | Bia Figueiredo | |
| Brazil | 34 | Hélio Castroneves | |
| Brazil | 53 | Alberto Valerio | |
| Brazil | 65 | Max Wilson | |
| Brazil | 71 | Marcos Pasquim | Actor, special guest |
| Brazil | 74 | Popó Bueno | |
| Brazil | 80 | Marcos Gomes | |
| Brazil | 90 | Ricardo Maurício | |
| Brazil | 99 | Xandinho Negrão | |
| Spain | 17 | Jaime Alguersuari | |

== Final classification ==
| Pos | Driver | Race 1 | Race 2 | Total |
|---|---|---|---|---|
| 1 | Lucas Di Grassi | 25 | 0 | 25 |
| 2 | Felipe Massa | 20 | 5 | 25 |
| 3 | Rubens Barrichello | 8 | 17 | 25 |
| 4 | Bia Figueiredo | 5 | 20 | 25 |
| 5 | Tony Kanaan | 11 | 13 | 24 |
| 6 | Jaime Alguersuari | 13 | 8 | 21 |
| 7 | Marcos Gomes | 10 | 11 | 21 |
| 8 | Felipe Giaffone | 4 | 15 | 19 |
| 9 | Antônio Pizzonia | 16 | 0 | 16 |
| 10 | Allam Khodair | 6 | 10 | 16 |
| 11 | Vítor Meira | 9 | 4 | 13 |
| 12 | João Paulo de Oliveira | 2 | 9 | 11 |
| 13 | Luciano Burti | 7 | 0 | 7 |
| 14 | Leonardo Nienkötter | 0 | 7 | 7 |
| 15 | Ricardo Zonta | 0 | 6 | 6 |
| 16 | Thiago Camilo | 3 | 2 | 5 |
| 17 | Enrique Bernoldi | 0 | 3 | 3 |
| 18 | Xandinho Negrão | 1 | 1 | 2 |
| 19 | Max Wilson | 0 | 0 | 0 |
| 20 | Ricardo Maurício | 0 | 0 | 0 |
| 21 | Hélio Castroneves | 0 | 0 | 0 |
| 22 | Bruno Senna | 0 | 0 | 0 |
| 23 | Alberto Valerio | 0 | 0 | 0 |
| 24 | Christian Fittipaldi | 0 | 0 | 0 |
| 25 | Popó Bueno | 0 | 0 | 0 |
| 26 | Cacá Bueno | 0 | 0 | 0 |
| 27 | Marcos Pasquim | 0 | 0 | 0 |
Result of race 1 is the tiebreaker
