= 2014 Desafio Internacional das Estrelas =

Seasons
- ← 2013 none →

2014 Desafio Internacional das Estrelas was the ninth edition of Desafio Internacional das Estrelas (International Challenge of the Stars), the races scheduled for 10–12 January 2014 at Kartódromo do Beto Carrero World at Penha, Santa Catarina, Brazil.

== Participants ==
Provisional entry list. Full grid is 26 units.

Country	No.	Drivers	2013 series
Brazil	3	Antônio Pizzonia	Rolex Sports Car Series / FIA World Endurance Championship
Brazil	4	Júlio Campos	Stock Car Brasil / Brasileiro de Marcas / Campeonato Sudamericano de GT
Brazil	8	Luciano Burti	Stock Car Brasil
Brazil	9	Ricardo Maurício	Stock Car Brasil / Brasileiro de Marcas / Rolex Sports Car Series
Brazil	10	Ricardo Zonta	Stock Car Brasil / Brasileiro de Marcas / FIA GT Series
Brazil	11	Rubens Barrichello	Stock Car Brasil / Rolex Sports Car Series
Brazil	12	Bruno Senna	FIA World Endurance Championship / American Le Mans Series / Blancpain Endurance Series / Stock Car Brasil
Brazil	15	Felipe Giaffone	Fórmula Truck / Rolex Sports Car Series
Brazil	16	Augusto Farfus	Deutsche Tourenwagen Masters / VLN
Brazil	18	Allam Khodair	Campeonato Sudamericano de GT / FIA GT Series / Brasileiro de Marcas
Brazil	19	Felipe Massa	Formula One
Brazil	21	Pietro Fittipaldi	BRDC Formula 4 Championship / Protyre Formula Renault Championship
Brazil	25	Felipe Nasr	GP2 Series / Rolex Sports Car Series
Brazil	28	Luiz Razia	International GT Open
Brazil	29	Daniel Serra	Stock Car Brasil / Campeonato Sudamericano de GT / Rolex Sports Car Series
Brazil	30	Nelson Piquet Jr.	NASCAR Nationwide Series / NASCAR Camping World Truck Series / Rolex Sports Car Series
Brazil	33	Bia Figueiredo	Indycar Series
Brazil	38	João Paulo de Oliveira	Super Formula / Super GT
Brazil	74	Popó Bueno	Stock Car Brasil
Brazil	77	Valdeno Brito	Stock Car Brasil / Brasileiro de Marcas
Brazil	88	Beto Monteiro	Fórmula Truck
Brazil	111	Lucas di Grassi	FIA World Endurance Championship / American Le Mans Series
France	TBA	Jules Bianchi	Formula One
Italy	20	Vitantonio Liuzzi	Superstars Series / FIA World Endurance Championship
Switzerland	117	Sébastien Buemi	FIA World Endurance Championship
