= 2013 Desafio Internacional das Estrelas =

Motorsport event

Seasons
- ← 2011 2014 →

2013 Desafio Internacional das Estrelas was the eighth edition of Desafio Internacional das Estrelas (International Challenge of the Stars), the races scheduled for 12–13 January 2013 at Kartódromo do Beto Carrero World at Penha, Santa Catarina, Brazil. The event was won by Jules Bianchi after he won the race 1 and finished in fourth position in race 2.

== Participants ==
Three champions took part in the 2013 edition (Massa, di Grassi and Alguersuari). 13 former and current Formula One drivers participated.

Country	No	Drivers	2012 series
Brazil	0	Cacá Bueno	Stock Car Brasil/Copa Fiat Brasil/Campeonato Brasileiro de GT
Brazil	1	Bruno Senna	Formula One
Brazil	3	Antônio Pizzonia	Stock Car Brasil/Auto GP World Series
Brazil	7	Enrique Bernoldi	FIA World Endurance Championship/Italian GT Championship
Brazil	8	Luciano Burti	Stock Car Brasil
Brazil	10	Ricardo Zonta	Stock Car Brasil/Brasileiro de Marcas
Brazil	16	Augusto Farfus	DTM
Brazil	18	Allam Khodair	Stock Car Brasil/Campeonato Brasileiro de GT
Brazil	19	Felipe Massa	Formula One
Brazil	21	Thiago Camilo	Stock Car Brasil/Brasileiro de Marcas
Brazil	23	João Paulo de Oliveira	Formula Nippon/Super GT
Brazil	25	Felipe Nasr	GP2 Series
Brazil	27	Vítor Meira	Stock Car Brasil/Brasileiro de Marcas
Brazil	30	Nelson Piquet Jr.	NASCAR Camping World Truck Series
Brazil	33	Bia Figueiredo	IndyCar Series
Brazil	77	Valdeno Brito	Stock Car Brasil/Campeonato Brasileiro de GT
Brazil	88	Beto Monteiro	Fórmula Truck
Brazil	90	Pietro Fittipaldi	Whelen All-American Series
Brazil	111	Lucas di Grassi	FIA World Endurance Championship
Brazil	121	Leonardo Nienkotter	Copa Fiat Brasil
France	5	Jules Bianchi	Formula Renault 3.5 Series
Italy	20	Vitantonio Liuzzi	Superstars Series/FIA World Endurance Championship
Japan	9	Kamui Kobayashi	Formula One
Spain	14	Fernando Alonso	Formula One
Spain	17	Jaime Alguersuari	none
Switzerland	31	Sébastien Buemi	FIA World Endurance Championship

== Classification ==
=== Qualifying ===
Pos	No	Country	Driver	Qualifying 1	Qualifying 2
1	5	France	Jules Bianchi	53.772	54.105
2	20	Italy	Vitantonio Liuzzi	53.750	54.278
3	31	Switzerland	Sébastien Buemi	53.814	54.318
4	27	Brazil	Vítor Meira	53.851	54:382
5	30	Brazil	Nelson Piquet Jr.	53.771	54.346
6	111	Brazil	Lucas di Grassi	53.811	54:398
7	25	Brazil	Felipe Nasr	54.043	54:529
8	90	Brazil	Pietro Fittipaldi	54.105	54.582
9	18	Brazil	Allam Khodair	54.044	54.590
10	16	Brazil	Augusto Farfus	54.045	54.793
11	3	Brazil	Antônio Pizzonia	53.900	
12	121	Brazil	Leonardo Nienkotter	54.111	
13	14	Spain	Fernando Alonso	54.008	
14	23	Brazil	João Paulo de Oliveira	54.156	
15	19	Brazil	Felipe Massa	54.053	
16	8	Brazil	Luciano Burti	54.164	
17	7	Brazil	Enrique Bernoldi	54.283	
18	88	Brazil	Beto Monteiro	54.232	
19	21	Brazil	Thiago Camilo	54.321	
20	9	Japan	Kamui Kobayashi	54.376	
21	0	Brazil	Cacá Bueno	54.556	
22	17	Spain	Jaime Alguersuari	54.393	
23	33	Brazil	Bia Figueiredo	55.043	
24	10	Brazil	Ricardo Zonta	54.629	
25	1	Brazil	Bruno Senna	54.679	
26	77	Brazil	Valdeno Brito	54.731	
Pole Position wins 2 points

=== Race 1 ===
Pos	No	Country	Driver	Laps	Time/Retired	Grid	Points
1	5	France	Jules Bianchi	29	26:15.050	1	25+2
2	111	Brazil	Lucas di Grassi	29	+4.873	6	20
3	20	Italy	Vitantonio Liuzzi	29	+8.779	2	16
4	31	Switzerland	Sébastien Buemi	29	+11.909	3	13
5	27	Brazil	Vítor Meira	29	+12.605	4	11
6	25	Brazil	Felipe Nasr	29	+13.477	7	10
7	30	Brazil	Nelson Piquet Jr.	29	+14.107	5	9
8	88	Brazil	Beto Monteiro	29	+14.459	18	8
9	16	Brazil	Augusto Farfus	29	+15.774	10	7
10	19	Brazil	Felipe Massa	29	+16.101	15	6
11	90	Brazil	Pietro Fittipaldi	29	+16.359	8	5
12	3	Brazil	Antônio Pizzonia	29	+18.131	11	4
13	33	Brazil	Bia Figueiredo	29	+18.814	23	3
14	17	Spain	Jaime Alguersuari	29	+21.769	22	2
15	7	Brazil	Enrique Bernoldi	29	+26.780	17	1
16	21	Brazil	Thiago Camilo	29	+26.901	19	
17	18	Brazil	Allam Khodair	29	+31.175	9	
18	77	Brazil	Valdeno Brito	29	+34.585	26	
19	23	Brazil	João Paulo de Oliveira	28	+1 lap	14	
20	1	Brazil	Bruno Senna	25	+3 laps	25	
21	14	Spain	Fernando Alonso	23	+4 laps	15	
22	10	Brazil	Ricardo Zonta	21	+8 laps	24	
Ret	121	Brazil	Leonardo Nienkotter	13	Retired	12	
Ret	0	Brazil	Cacá Bueno	11	Retired	21	
Ret	9	Japan	Kamui Kobayashi	6	Retired	20	
Ret	8	Brazil	Luciano Burti	1	Retired	16	
Fastest Lap: Jules Bianchi, 53.573

=== Race 2 ===
Pos	No	Country	Driver	Laps	Time/Retired	Grid	Points
1	25	Brazil	Felipe Nasr	29	26:19.434	3	25
2	30	Brazil	Nelson Piquet Jr.	29	+3.881	2	20
3	88	Brazil	Beto Monteiro	29	+4.339	1	16
4	5	France	Jules Bianchi	29	+4.870	8	13
5	20	Italy	Vitantonio Liuzzi	29	+7.803	6	11
6	111	Brazil	Lucas di Grassi	29	+9.640	7	10
7	31	Switzerland	Sébastien Buemi	29	+10.227	5	9
8	19	Brazil	Felipe Massa	29	+14.490	10	8
9	3	Brazil	Antônio Pizzonia	29	+15.183	12	7
10	7	Brazil	Enrique Bernoldi	29	+17.035	15	6
11	23	Brazil	João Paulo de Oliveira	29	+17.492	19	5
12	90	Brazil	Pietro Fittipaldi	29	+21.319	11	4
13	10	Brazil	Ricardo Zonta	29	+25.062	22	3
14	1	Brazil	Bruno Senna	29	+27.772	20	2
15	33	Brazil	Bia Figueiredo	29	+27.793	13	1
16	21	Brazil	Thiago Camilo	29	+28.770	16	
17	121	Brazil	Leonardo Nienkotter	29	+29.880	23	
18	14	Spain	Fernando Alonso	29	+36.497	21	
19	16	Brazil	Augusto Farfus	29	+37.556	9	
20	77	Brazil	Valdeno Brito	28	+1 lap	19	
21	8	Brazil	Luciano Burti	23	+6 laps	26	
22	27	Brazil	Vítor Meira	21	+8 laps	4	
Ret	9	Japan	Kamui Kobayashi	13	Retired	25	
Ret	0	Brazil	Cacá Bueno	10	Retired	24	
Ret	17	Spain	Jaime Alguersuari	4	Retired	14	
Ret	18	Brazil	Allam Khodair	4	Retired	17	
Fastest Lap: Felipe Nasr, 53.887

=== Final classification ===
Pos	No	Country	Driver	Race 1	Race 2	Total
1	5	France	Jules Bianchi	27	13	40
2	25	Brazil	Felipe Nasr	10	25	35
3	111	Brazil	Lucas di Grassi	20	10	30
4	30	Brazil	Nelson Piquet Jr.	9	20	29
5	20	Italy	Vitantonio Liuzzi	16	11	27
6	88	Brazil	Beto Monteiro	8	16	24
7	31	Switzerland	Sébastien Buemi	13	9	22
8	19	Brazil	Felipe Massa	6	8	14
9	27	Brazil	Vítor Meira	11		11
10	3	Brazil	Antônio Pizzonia	4	7	11
11	90	Brazil	Pietro Fittipaldi	5	4	9
12	16	Brazil	Augusto Farfus	7		7
13	7	Brazil	Enrique Bernoldi	1	6	7
14	23	Brazil	João Paulo de Oliveira		5	5
15	33	Brazil	Bia Figueiredo	3	1	4
16	10	Brazil	Ricardo Zonta		3	3
17	14	Spain	Jaime Alguersuari	2		2
18	1	Brazil	Bruno Senna		2	2
	21	Brazil	Thiago Camilo			
	18	Brazil	Allam Khodair			
	77	Brazil	Valdeno Brito			
	14	Spain	Fernando Alonso			
	121	Brazil	Leonardo Nienkotter			
	0	Brazil	Cacá Bueno			
	9	Japan	Kamui Kobayashi			
	8	Brazil	Luciano Burti			
Result of race 1 is the tiebreaker
