= Desafio Internacional das Estrelas =

Annual charity kart race in Brazil

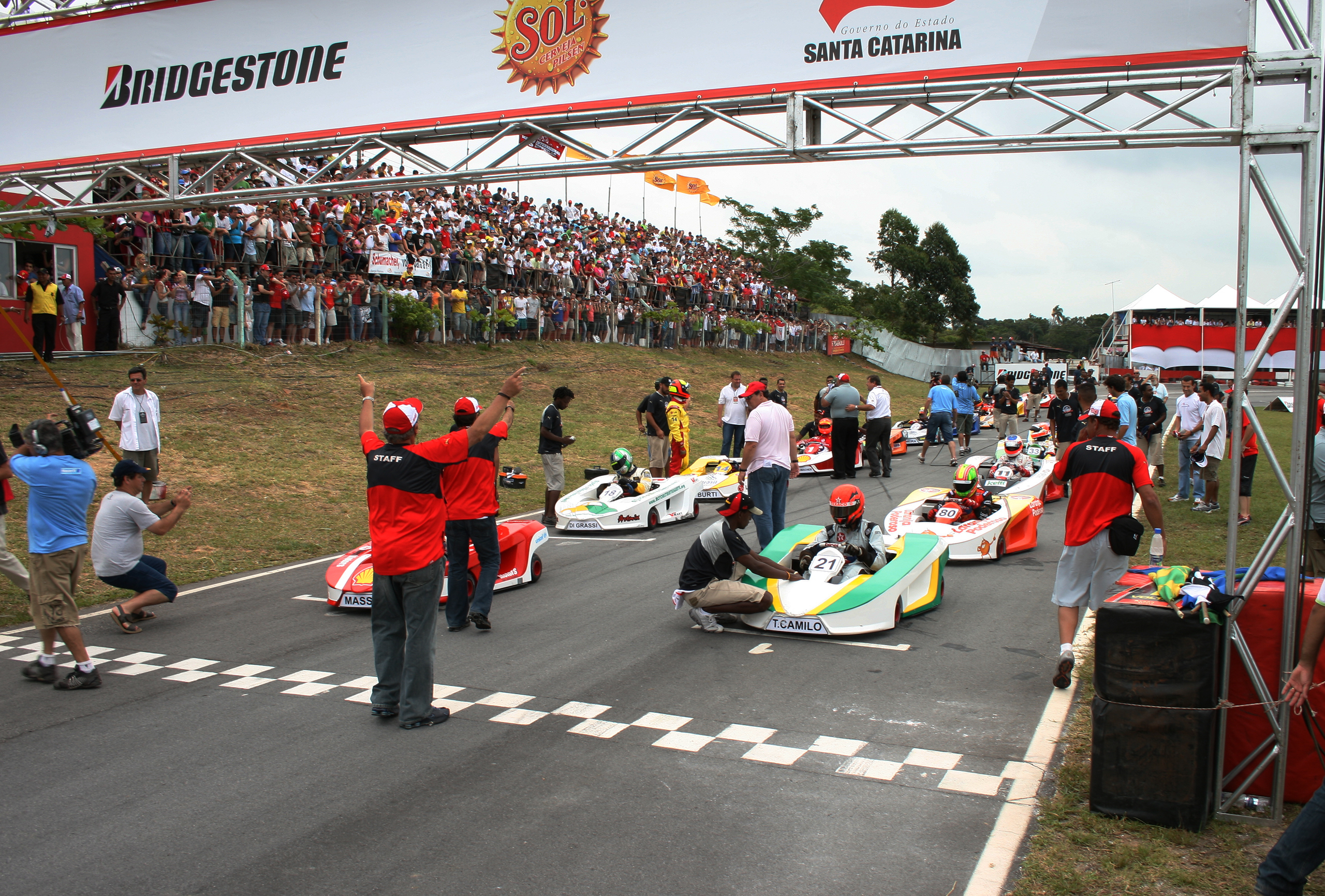
Grid of Race-2 2007 Desafio Internacional das Estrelas

The Desafio Internacional das Estrelas ("International Challenge of the Stars" in Portuguese) is an annual charity kart race organised by Felipe Massa since 2005. The first edition was held on Kartódromo Toca da Coruja on Bauru. For 2006 at 2008 the challenge was moved to Kartódromo dos Ingleses on Florianópolis and since 2009 at Arena Sapiens Park, also at Florianópolis.

Notably, top level Brazilian drivers have competed in the event, such as Felipe Massa, Bruno Senna, Rubens Barrichello, Tony Kanaan, Hélio Castroneves, Lucas di Grassi and Nelson Piquet Jr. Also Brazilian drivers on the national championship such as Stock Car Brasil and Fórmula Truck. In addition, Brazilian motorcycle racer Alex Barros has competed. International drivers such as Jean Alesi and Robert Doornbos joined the Brazilian contingent in 2006, Vitantonio Liuzzi competed in 2006, 2008, 2009, 2011 and 2013, Michael Schumacher racing in 2007, 2008 and 2009, Luca Badoer joined in 2007 and 2008. Jeff Gordon participated in 2008, Jaime Alguersuari in 2010, 2011 and 2013, Jules Bianchi in 2011 and 2013, Adrian Sutil, Pastor Maldonado Jérôme d'Ambrosio and Gianni Morbidelli at 2011 participated in the competition. Fernando Alonso, Sébastien Buemi and Kamui Kobayashi all took part in the competition in 2013.

== Scoring system ==
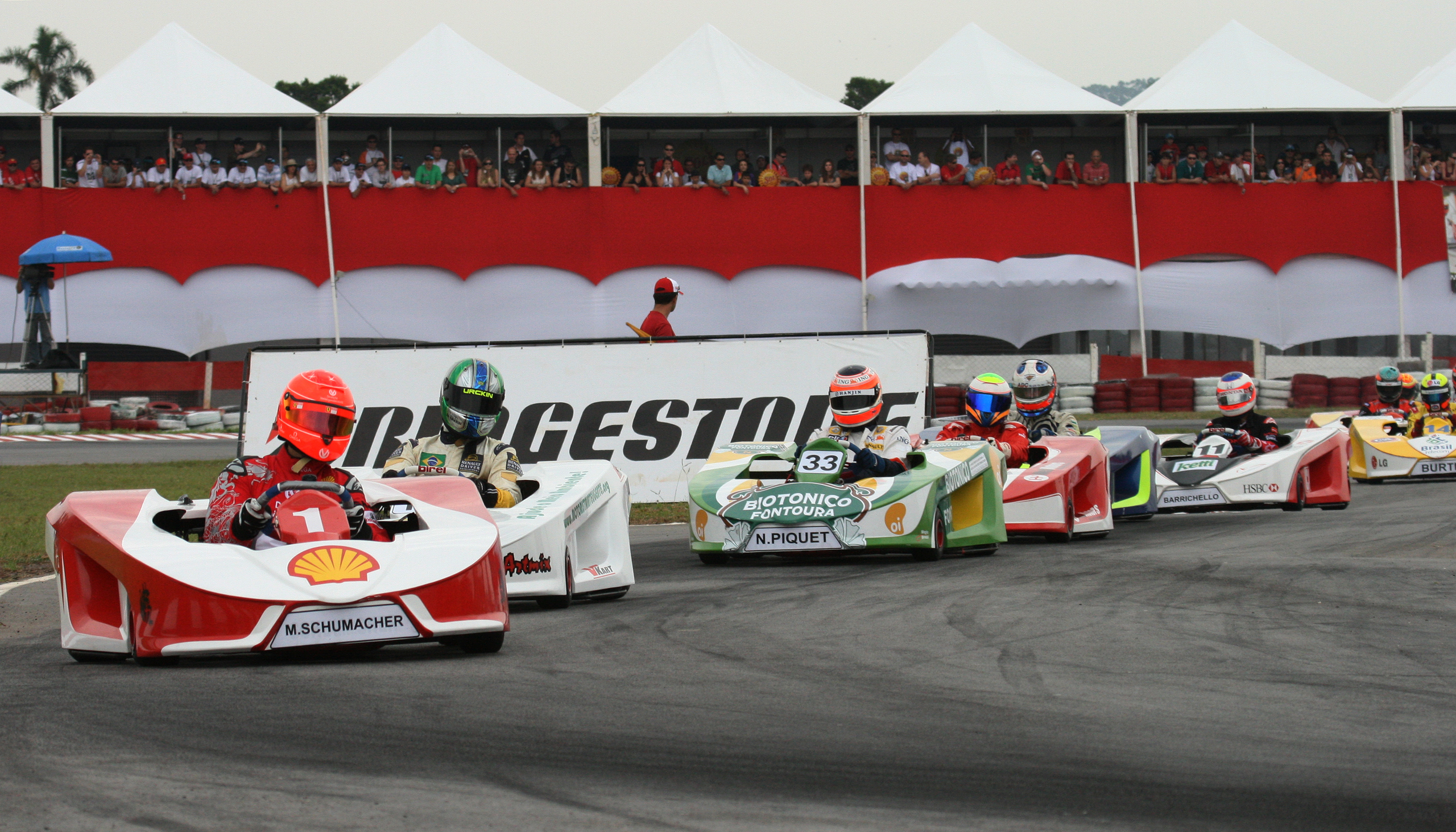
The Desafio Internacional das Estrelas in 2007.

The score of each race is established as follows:

Points for each race
1st	2nd	3rd	4th	5th	6th	7th	8th	9th	10th	11th	12th	13th	14th	15th
25	20	16	13	11	10	9	8	7	6	5	4	3	2	1

Pole position for race 1 race wins 2 points, at the end of two races, to ensure that the driver the score for their finishing position, he must complete a minimum of 75% of the laps completed by the leader. In the event of a tie, is used as tiebreaker the result obtained in first race.

== Results ==
Year	Overall winner	Race 1 winner	Race 2 winner	Location	Date
2005	(Brazil) Daniel Serra	(Brazil) Daniel Serra	(Brazil) Allam Khodair	Bauru-SP	December 11
2006	(Brazil) Felipe Massa	(Brazil) Felipe Massa	(Brazil) Antônio Pizzonia	Florianópolis-SC	December 17
2007	(Germany) Michael Schumacher	(Germany) Michael Schumacher	(Brazil) Lucas di Grassi	Florianópolis-SC	November 25
2008	(Brazil) Rubens Barrichello	(Brazil) Rubens Barrichello	(Brazil) Felipe Massa	Florianópolis-SC	December 2
2009	(Germany) Michael Schumacher	(Germany) Michael Schumacher	(Brazil) Felipe Massa	Florianópolis-SC	November 28–29
2010	(Brazil) Lucas di Grassi	(Brazil) Lucas di Grassi	(Brazil) Bia Figueiredo	Florianópolis-SC	December 18–19
2011	(Spain) Jaime Alguersuari	(France) Jules Bianchi	(Spain) Jaime Alguersuari	Florianópolis-SC	December 3–4
2012	not held				
2013	(France) Jules Bianchi	(France) Jules Bianchi	(Brazil) Felipe Nasr	Florianópolis-SC	January 12–13
2014	(Italy) Vitantonio Liuzzi	Cancelled	(Italy) Vitantonio Liuzzi	Florianópolis-SC	January 11–12

== Winners ==
Driver	Champion	Runner-up	Third place
(Germany) Michael Schumacher	2 (2007, 2009)		
(Brazil) Felipe Massa	1 (2006)	3 (2009, 2010, 2011)	3 (2005, 2008, 2014)
(Brazil) Lucas di Grassi	1 (2010)	1 (2008)	4 (2006, 2007, 2011, 2013)
(Brazil) Rubens Barrichello	1 (2008)		1 (2010)
(Brazil) Daniel Serra	1 (2005)		
(Spain) Jaime Alguersuari	1 (2011)		
(France) Jules Bianchi	1 (2013)		
(Italy) Vitantonio Liuzzi	1 (2014)		
(Brazil) Allam Khodair		1 (2005)	
(Brazil) Nelson Piquet Jr.		1 (2006)	
(Brazil) Luciano Burti		1 (2007)	
(Brazil) Felipe Nasr		1 (2013)	
(Switzerland) Sébastien Buemi		1 (2014)	
(Brazil) Vítor Meira			1 (2009)
