= 2005 Desafio Internacional das Estrelas =

2005 Desafio Internacional das Estrelas
| Previous: none | Next: 2006 |

2005 Desafio Internacional das Estrelas was the first edition of Desafio Internacional das Estrelas (International Challenge of the Stars) kart race, held in 2005 in Brazil, was won by Daniel Serra.

== Race 1 results ==
- 1 – Daniel Serra, 25 points
- 2 – Allam Khodair, 20

== Race 2 results ==
- 1 – Allam Khodair,
- 3 – Daniel Serra,

== Final classification ==
| Rank | Driver | R1 | R2 | Final |
|---|---|---|---|---|
| 1 | (Brazil) Daniel Serra | 1 | 3 | 38 |
| 2 | (Brazil) Allam Khodair | 2 | 1 | 37 |
| 3 | (Brazil) Felipe Massa | 3 | | 31 |
| 4 | (Brazil) Emil Shayeb | 6 | | 22 |
| 4 | (Brazil) Átila Abreu | 5 | | 22 |
| 6 | (Brazil) Ricardo Maurício | 4 | | 13 |
| 6 | (Brazil) Luciano Burti | 9 | | 13 |
| 6 | (Brazil) Andréia Octaviano | 8 | | 13 |
| 9 | (Brazil) Airton Daré | | | 12 |
| 10 | (Brazil) Thiago Camilo | 12 | | 11 |
