= Jaime Alguersuari =

Spanish racing driver (born 1990)

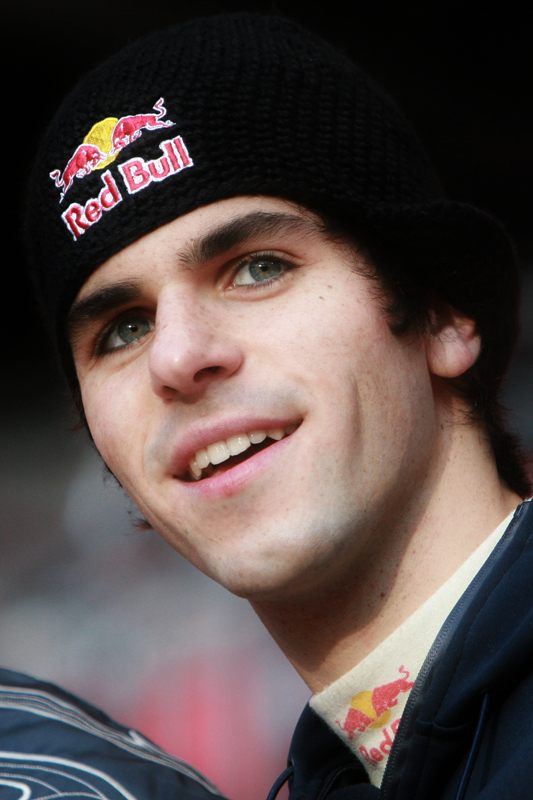
- Alguersuari in 2008
- Born: Jaime Víctor Alguersuari Escudero; 23 March 1990 (age 36); Barcelona, Spain
- Parent: Jaime Alguersuari Sr. (father)

Formula One World Championship career
- Nationality: (Spain) Spanish
- Active years: 2009–2011
- Team: Toro Rosso
- Entries: 46
- Championships: 0
- Wins: 0
- Podiums: 0
- Career points: 31
- Pole positions: 0
- Fastest laps: 0
- First entry: 2009 Hungarian Grand Prix
- Last entry: 2011 Brazilian Grand Prix

Previous series
- 2014–2015 2014 2009 2008 2008 2006–2007 2005–2007 2005: Formula E ADAC GT Masters; Formula Renault 3.5; British F3; Spanish F3; Italian Formula Renault; Formula Renault Eurocup; Formula Junior 1600 Italia

Championship titles
- 2008 2006: British F3; Italian Formula Renault

Jaime Víctor Alguersuari Escudero (Note: Catalan: Jaume Alguersuari (pronounced [ˈʒawmə əlɣəɾsuˈaɾi])) (Spanish pronunciation: [ˈxajme alɣeɾˈswaɾi]; born 23 March 1990), also known by his stage name Squire, is a Spanish former racing driver, broadcaster and DJ, who competed in Formula One from 2009 to 2011.

Born and raised in Barcelona, Alguersuari is the son of motorcycle road racer Jaime Alguersuari, Sr. Alguersuari won the 2008 British Formula 3 International Series. Alguersuari became the youngest Formula One driver to start a Grand Prix in history at the 2009 Hungarian Grand Prix – at the age of 19 years, 125 days, a record that was broken by Max Verstappen in 2015 who competed at just 17 years of age. Alguersuari is also the first person born in the 1990s to start a Formula 1 Grand Prix. After losing his drive with the Toro Rosso team in late 2011, Alguersuari joined British radio station BBC Radio 5 Live to be their expert summariser for the 2012 Formula One season, alongside lead commentator James Allen. At the age of 25, Alguersuari officially retired from motorsport to concentrate on his DJ career.

== Early life and career ==
Jaime Víctor Alguersuari Escudero was born on 23 March 1990 in Barcelona, Catalonia, Spain.

=== Lower formulae ===
Alguersuari began his formula racing career, in the Italian Formula 1600 Junior Series, in 2005. In 2006, he won the Italian Formula Renault Winter Series, before finishing as runner-up to Mika Mäki in the main championship the following year.

=== Formula Three ===
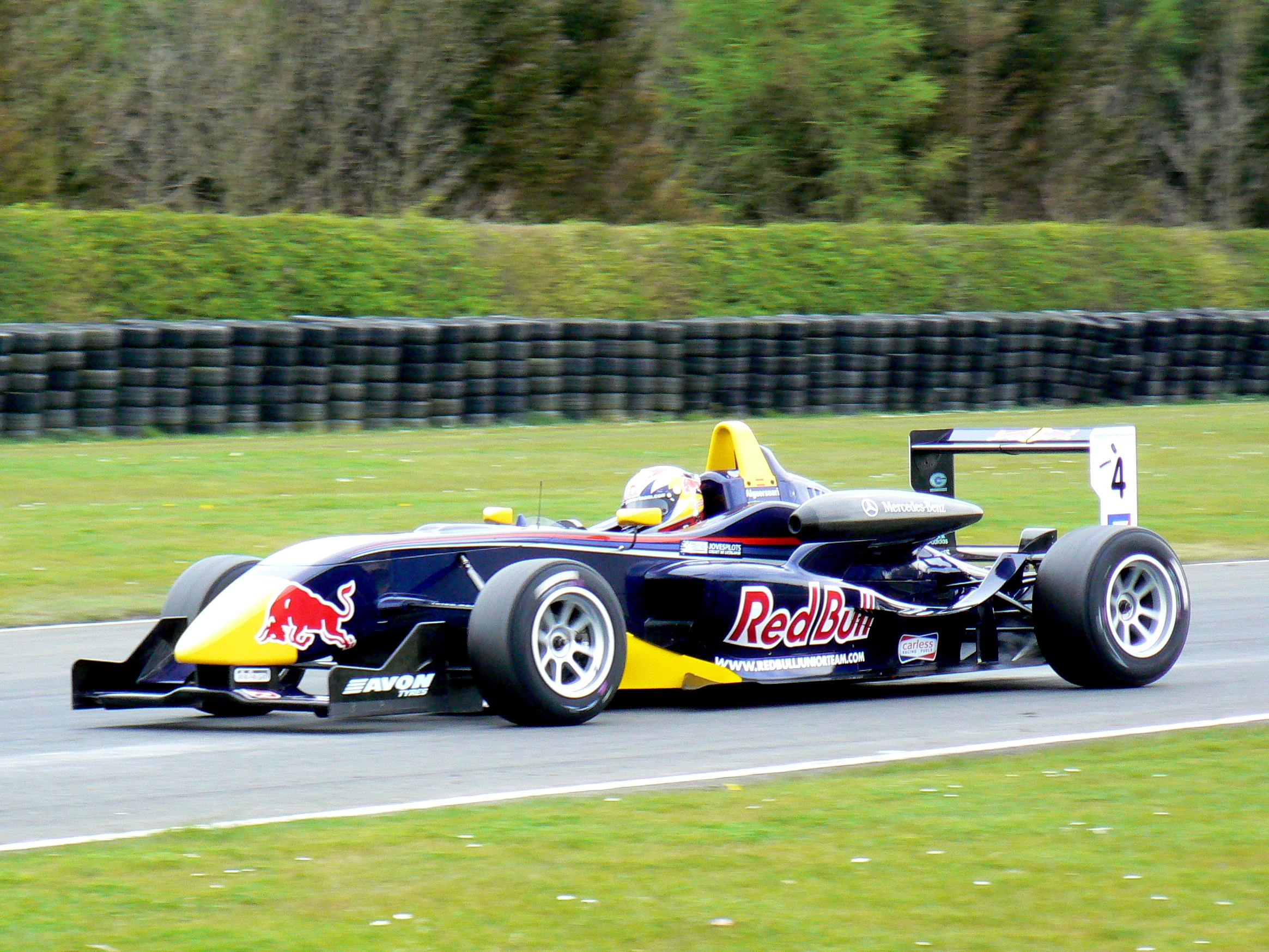
Alguersuari driving for Carlin Motorsport at the Croft round of the 2008 British Formula Three season

Alguersuari moved up to the British Formula Three Championship for 2008, driving for the Carlin Motorsport alongside teammates Brendon Hartley, Oliver Turvey and Sam Abay. After a season-long battle between Alguersuari, Hartley, Turvey and Sergio Pérez, Alguersuari won the final three races of the season to clinch the championship. He thus became the youngest title winner in championship history, aged eighteen years and 203 days. He also deputised for the injured Mark Webber in the 2008 Race of Champions event at the Wembley Stadium in December 2008.

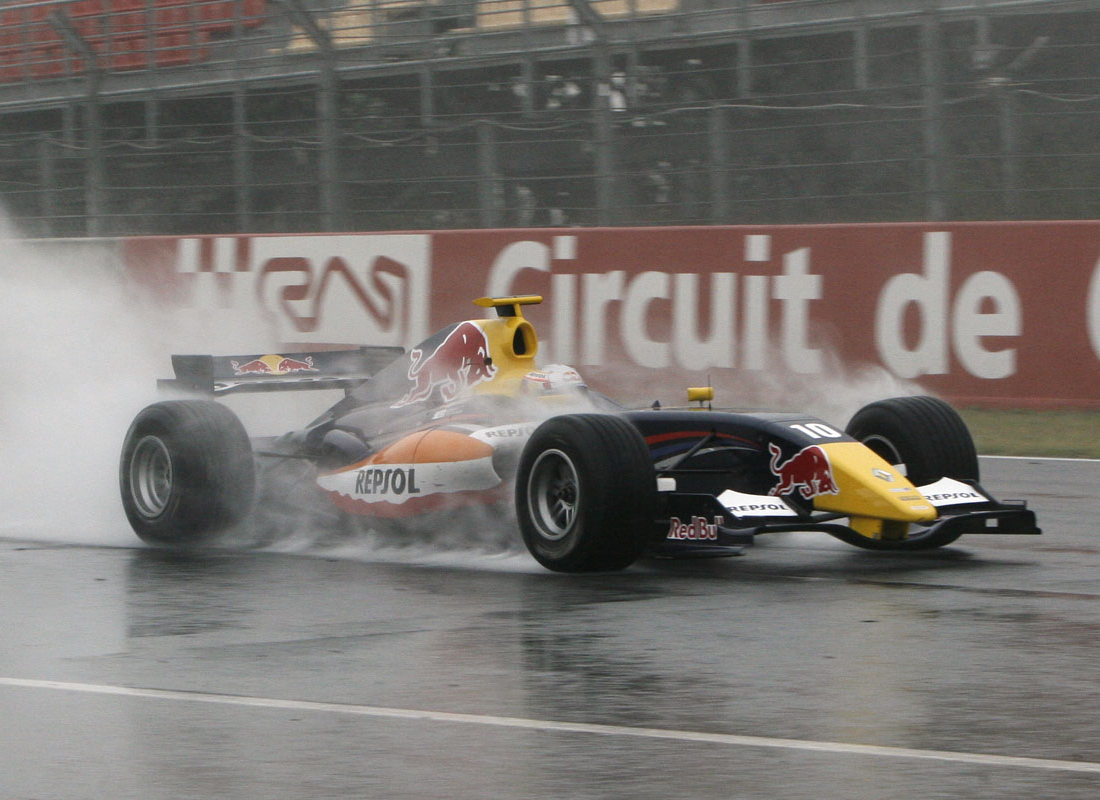
Alguersuari competing at Circuit de Catalunya during the 2009 Formula Renault 3.5 Series.

=== Formula Renault 3.5 Series ===
He competed in the Formula Renault 3.5 Series in 2009, continuing with the Carlin team and with Turvey once again as his teammate. At the time of his move to Formula One mid-season, he was eighth in the championship, with one podium finish, and was the second-highest rookie driver in the standings behind Turvey. Despite his promotion to an F1 race seat, he carried on in FR3.5. A week after his Formula One debut, Alguersuari returned to the series at the Autódromo Internacional do Algarve, and scored both his first pole, and his first victory in the series. His 27-point haul for the weekend moved him from eighth to third in the championship standings. Alguersuari eventually ended up sixth, dropping from third in the final race.

== Formula One career ==
=== Scuderia Toro Rosso (2009–2011) ===
==== 2009 season ====
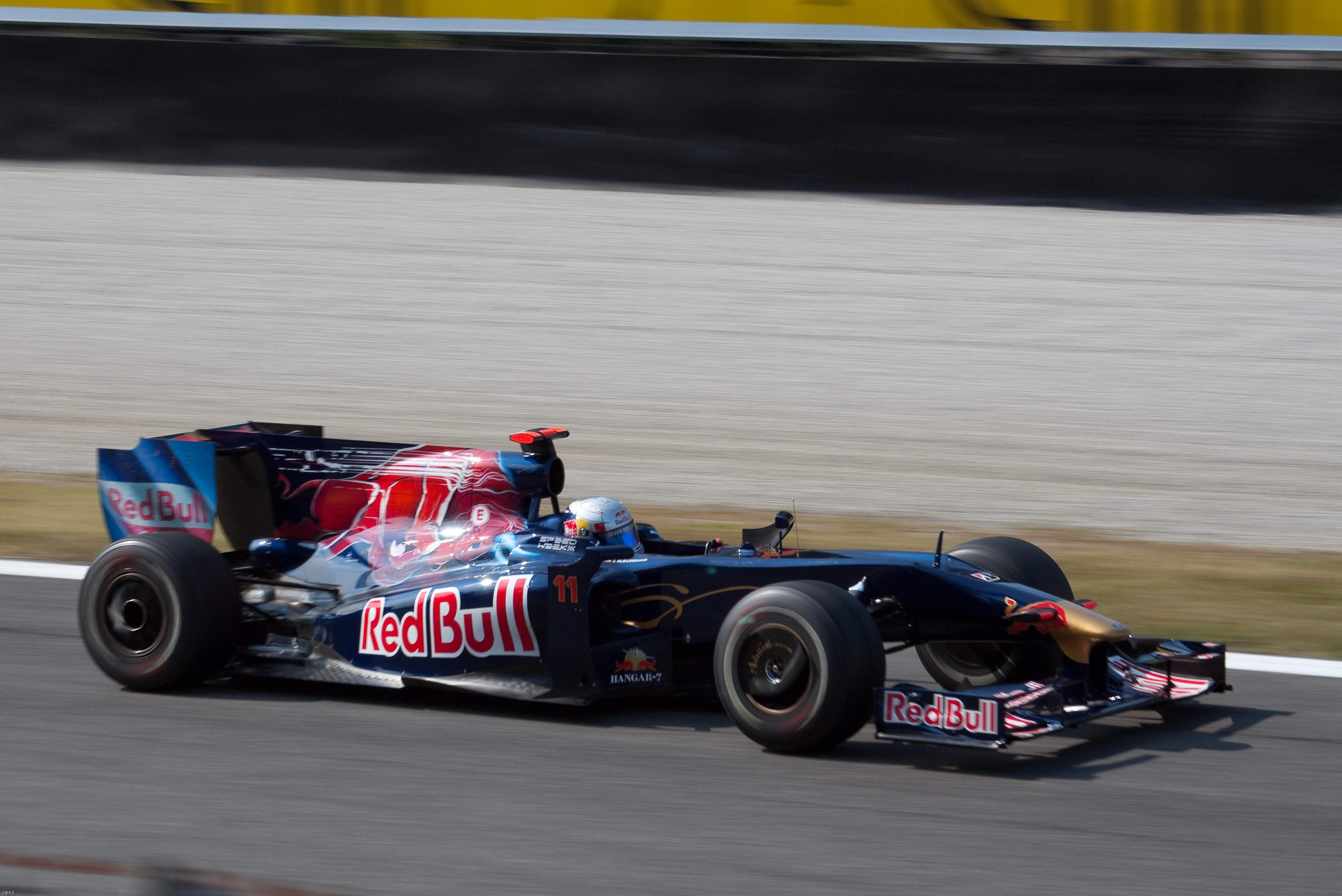
Alguersuari driving for Toro Rosso at the 2009 Italian Grand Prix

Alguersuari took over the role of reserve driver for the Red Bull Racing and Scuderia Toro Rosso Formula One teams from fellow Red Bull Junior driver Brendon Hartley in the second half of the 2009 Formula One season. Less than two weeks later, race driver Sébastien Bourdais left the Toro Rosso team after the 2009 German Grand Prix and Alguersuari was immediately expected to be his successor, despite the lack of an official confirmation. Four days later, Toro Rosso announced that Alguersuari would drive for the team at the 2009 Hungarian Grand Prix. He became the youngest ever Formula One driver at the age of nineteen years and 125 days, breaking the record previously held by Mike Thackwell. He became only the seventh teenager and the first person born in the 1990s to start a Grand Prix. Qualifying in last place following a mechanical problem, he finished the race in fifteenth, one place ahead of his teammate Sébastien Buemi. Through the rest of the season, he had little success, with his best result coming at the 2009 Brazilian Grand Prix, where he managed 14th place. At the remaining eight races, he only finished three of them and retired in the other five. During the season, he also had a huge crash in the Japanese Grand Prix while he was attempting to chase for his first points.

==== 2010 season ====
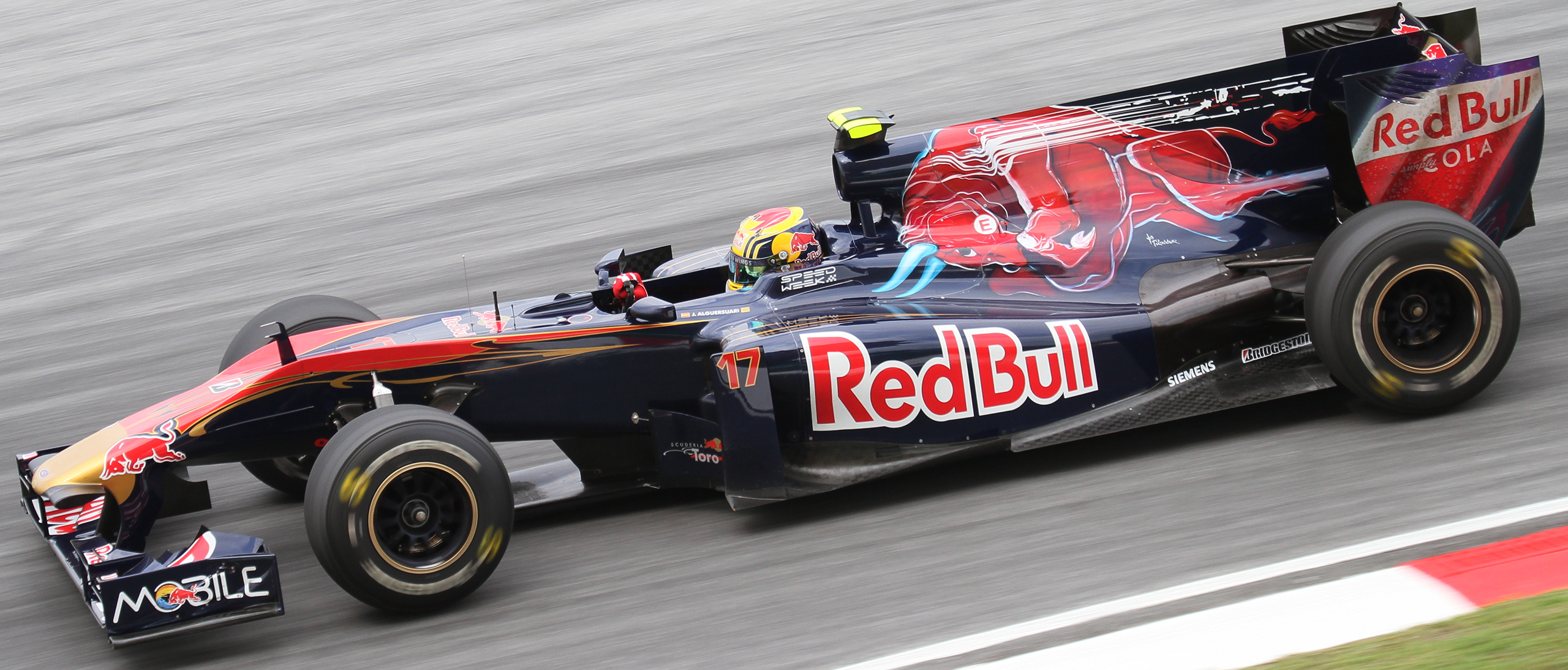
Alguersuari driving for Toro Rosso at the 2010 Malaysian Grand Prix, in which he scored his first World Championship points

Toro Rosso retained Alguersuari for the 2010 season, starting with a career-best finishes of thirteenth in Bahrain and eleventh in Australia including 22 laps battling with the seven-time world champion Michael Schumacher. In Malaysia one week later, Alguersuari scored his first ever Formula One points with a ninth-placed finish. Toro Rosso team principal Franz Tost praised Alguersuari's performance, saying the Spaniard "drove a fantastic race". Alguersuari then scored another point after finishing tenth at his home Grand Prix. In May, Alguersuari visited the Dominican Republic with his Red Bull team and became one of the first drivers to ever drive a Formula 1 vehicle on the beaches there. In the next 14 races, he only had one more points finish, at the final race of the year in Abu Dhabi.

==== 2011 season ====
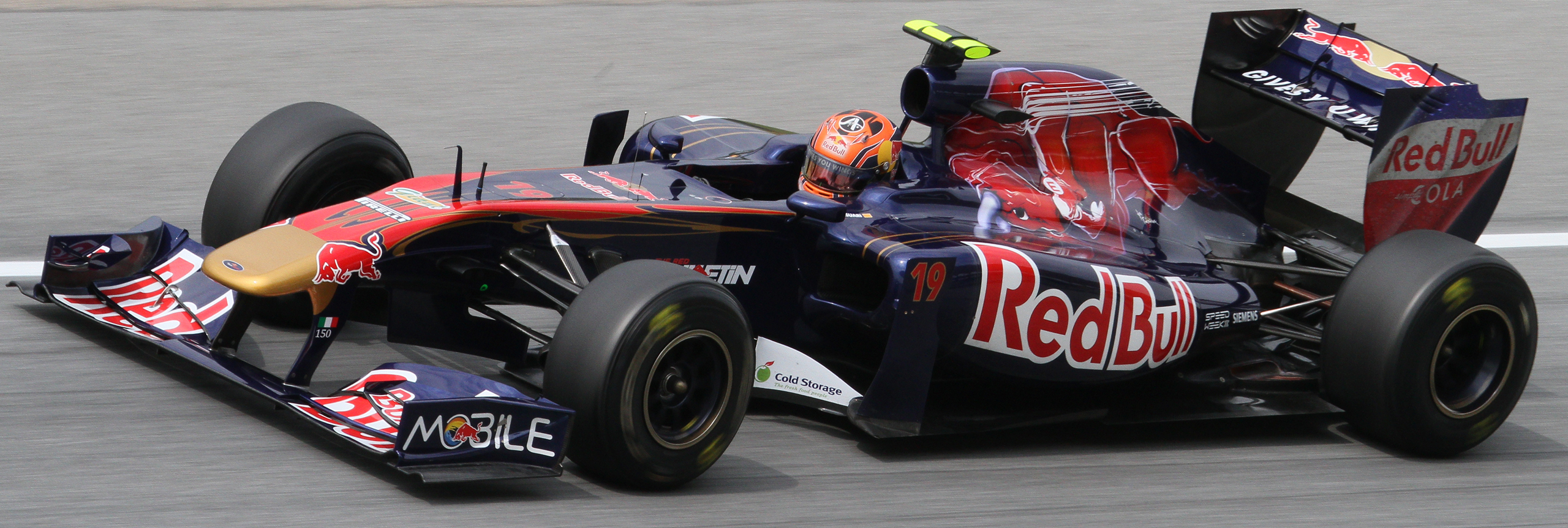
Alguersuari driving for Toro Rosso at the 2011 Malaysian Grand Prix

Toro Rosso confirmed that Alguersuari was to be retained alongside Sébastien Buemi for the 2011 season. After finishing the first two races outside the points, Alguersuari qualified inside the top ten for the first time in Formula One, with a seventh place grid start in China. Two 16th places and a retirement followed in the next three races, before taking his best Formula One placing of eighth at the Canadian Grand Prix, and then matching that at the European Grand Prix. These results came at a crucial time for Alguersuari, with Daniel Ricciardo being linked to replace Alguersuari for the 2012 season. Alguersuari finished tenth at the British Grand Prix, giving him a run of three consecutive point scoring finishes. He qualified a career best sixth at the Belgian Grand Prix before being forced to retire during the race after a first corner collision with Bruno Senna. Alguersuari finished in seventh place at the Italian Grand Prix, improving upon his previous best of two eighth places earlier in the season. He crashed out on the penultimate lap in Singapore, but was classified in 21st place. In Korea, Alguersuari finished seventh after passing Nico Rosberg on the final lap, and added another eighth-place finish in India.

Following the last race of the season in Brazil, Alguersuari won the Desafio Internacional das Estrelas karting event, organised by Felipe Massa. On 14 December 2011, Toro Rosso announced that Ricciardo and Jean-Éric Vergne would be the team's drivers in 2012, replacing Alguersuari and Buemi.

== Formula E career ==
=== Virgin (2014–2015) ===
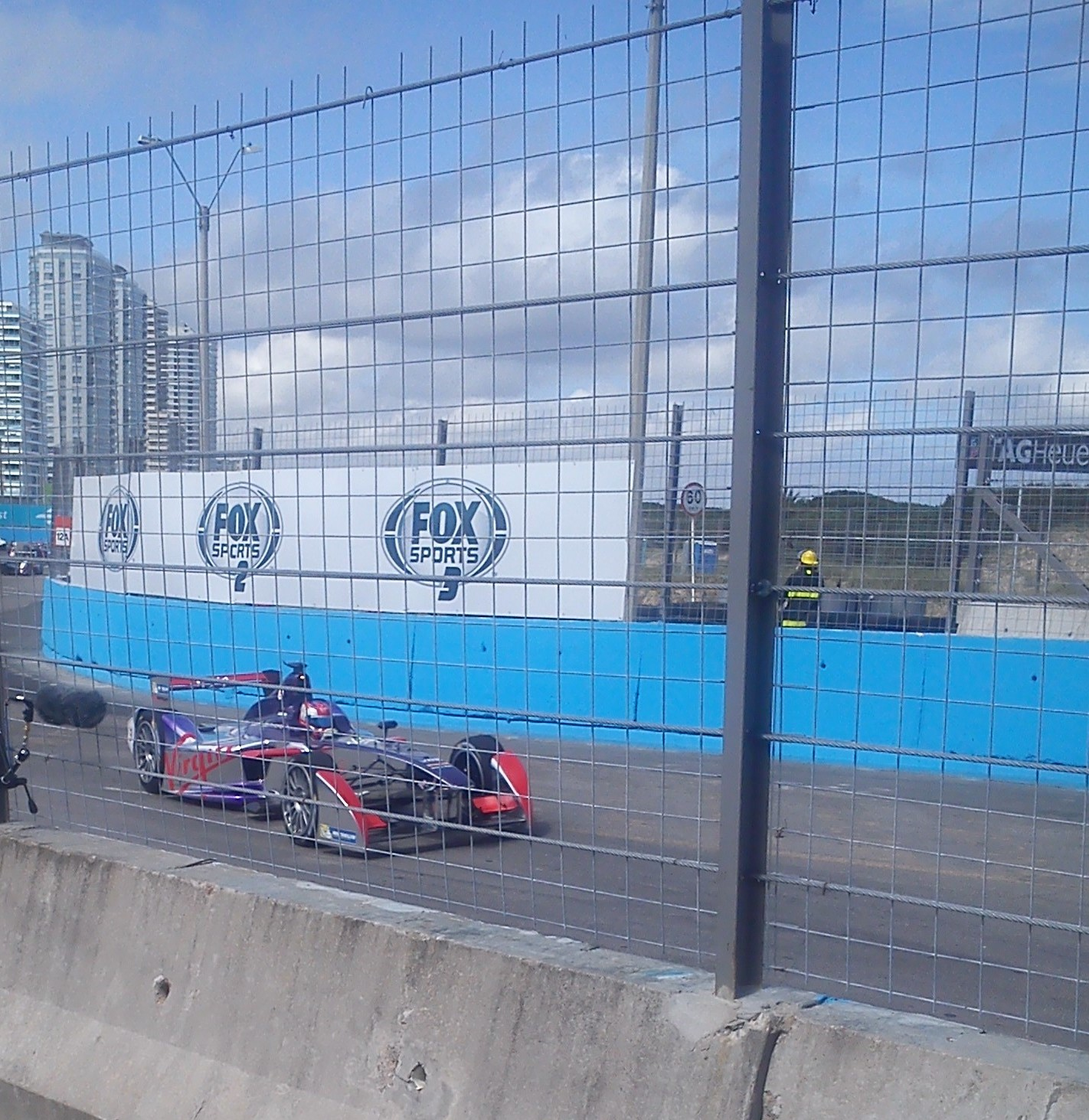
Alguersuari racing in the 2014 Punta del Este ePrix

Alguersuari commented by 2013 that he would not be trying to return to Formula One. The same week, he contested a round of the CIK-FIA KZ world karting championship.

Later, Alguersuari became part of the Formula E Drivers' Club, enabling him to be picked by any of the Formula E teams to race with them. In March 2014, Alguersuari announced that he would compete with Virgin Racing, joining Sam Bird for the season. Alguersuari got a best finish of fourth at the 2015 Buenos Aires ePrix but only scored points on four occasions throughout the season. He had a single retirement at the 2015 Monaco ePrix where he was caught up in the first lap collision. He had to miss the final two rounds of the season due to minor health issues which caused him to faint at the end of the 2015 Moscow ePrix and was replaced by Fabio Leimer. Alguersuari finished the season with 30 points and placed 13th in the championship.

On 1 October 2015, Alguersuari officially retired from all forms of motorsport, explaining that he had "fallen out of love with this girlfriend".

== Other ventures ==
=== Return to karting ===
Being in his first season of Formula One, Alguersuari also participated in the CIK-FIA World Cup - KZ1 in 2009, where he was 23rd.

Alguersuari also competed in the Desafio Internacional das Estrelas in 2010 (where he was sixth), 2011 (where he won) and 2013 (seventeenth).

In 2013, already out of Formula One, Alguersuari participated in the CIK-FIA World KZ Championship, where he was ninth.

In 2021, years after announcing his retirement from motorsports, Alguersuari decided to return to competition, participating in the Spanish karting championship. However, in the first race of the season at the Campillos circuit, he finished third, but suffered a rib fracture that prevented him from participating in most of the season and cut short his aspirations to participate in the world championship and the European karting championship. He returned in the last race of the season in Zuera, Zaragoza, in October where he managed to win the race. In November, he participated in the Winter Cup in Lonato, finishing 15th after climbing ten positions.

In 2022, Alguersuari took part of the Andrea Margutti Trophy, finishing 16th after climbing 14 positions and setting the fastest lap. He also returned to participate in the Spanish karting championship.

=== DJ career ===
In addition to driving racing cars, Alguersuari has his own recording studio in Barcelona, and is well known in Spain as a DJ, under the stage name Squire (in reference to his second surname Escudero). Alguersuari headlined the 2010 Barcelona Music Conference and has played sets at clubs including Amnesia in Ibiza. His debut album Organic Life was released by Blanco y Negro Records on 14 September 2011, and topped the iTunes album chart five days after its release.

In 2019, Alguersuari released the album The Leftovers of Stars Collide in collaboration with Pablo Bolívar and in 2021 Squire released STOP, his new album.

"I'm a Formula One driver but I have another thing in my life, and that is music. It's obviously quite strange to see a Formula One driver having another life but this is who I am. I've always said it's important to follow your instincts: I love music and racing doesn't interfere with that. I love to close the door and produce, compose, play music, listen to music. I couldn't live without it, just as I couldn't live without racing."

== Racing record ==
=== Career summary ===
Season	Series	Team	Races	Wins	Poles	F/Laps	Podiums	Points	Position
2005	Formula Junior 1600 Italia	Tomcat Racing	12	2	2	?	4	160	**3rd**
2005	Eurocup Formula Renault 2.0	Epsilon Euskadi	2	0	0	0	0	0	NC†
2006	Formula Renault 2.0 Italia	Cram Competition	15	0	0	0	1	56	10th
2006	Eurocup Formula Renault 2.0	Cram Competition	14	0	0	0	1	24	12th
2006	Formula Renault 2.0 Italia Winter Series	Cram Competition	4	4	4	3	4	142	**1st**
2007	Formula Renault 2.0 Italia	Epsilon Red Bull Team	14	3	3	2	7	266	**2nd**
2007	Eurocup Formula Renault 2.0	Epsilon Red Bull Team	14	0	0	0	2	67	5th
2008	British Formula 3 International Series	Carlin Motorsport	22	5	6	5	12	251	**1st**
2008	Masters of Formula 3	Carlin Motorsport	1	0	0	0	0	N/A	8th
2008	Macau Grand Prix	Carlin Motorsport	1	0	0	0	0	N/A	10th
2008	Spanish Formula 3 Championship	GTA Motor Competición	8	3	2	1	4	60	7th
2009	Formula Renault 3.5 Series	Carlin Motorsport	17	1	1	1	3	88	6th
2009	Formula One	Scuderia Toro Rosso	8	0	0	0	0	0	24th
2010	Formula One	Scuderia Toro Rosso	19	0	0	0	0	5	19th
2011	Formula One	Scuderia Toro Rosso	19	0	0	0	0	26	14th
2012	Formula One	Pirelli	Test driver						
2013	Formula One	Pirelli	Test driver						
2014	ADAC GT Masters	Rowe Racing	12	0	0	0	0	24	29th
2014–15	Formula E	Virgin Racing	9	0	0	1	0	30	13th
2015	Stock Car Brasil	RZ Motorsport	1	0	0	0	0	0	NC†

^{†} As Alguersuari was a guest driver, he was ineligible to score points.

=== Complete Eurocup Formula Renault 2.0 results ===
(key) (Races in bold indicate pole position, races in italics indicate fastest lap)

Year	Team	1	2	3	4	5	6	7	8	9	10	11	12	13	14	15	16	Pos	Points
2005	Epsilon Euskadi	ZOL; 1	ZOL; 2	VAL; 1	VAL; 2	LMS; 1	LMS; 2	BIL; 1	BIL; 2	OSC; 1	OSC; 2	DON; 1	DON; 2	EST; 1	EST; 2	MNZ; 1; 24	MNZ; 2; 12	NC	0
2006	Cram Competition	ZOL; 1; 31	ZOL; 2; 21	IST; 1; 16	IST; 2; 9	MIS; 1; 7	MIS; 2; 2	NÜR; 1; 20	NÜR; 2; 31	DON; 1 Ret	DON; 2 Ret	LMS; 1 Ret	LMS; 2 Ret	CAT; 1; 5	CAT; 2; 16			12th	24
2007	Epsilon Red Bull Team	ZOL; 1; 4	ZOL; 2; 23	NÜR; 1; 10	NÜR; 2; 9	HUN; 1 Ret	HUN; 2; 4	DON; 1; 5	DON; 2 Ret	MAG; 1; 6	MAG; 2; 6	EST; 1; 5	EST; 2; 27†	CAT; 1; 2	CAT; 2; 2			5th	67

=== Complete Formula Renault 2.0 Italia results ===
(key) (Races in bold indicate pole position, races in italics indicate fastest lap)

Year	Team	1	2	3	4	5	6	7	8	9	10	11	12	13	14	15	Pos	Points
2006	Cram Competition	MUG; 1; 19	MUG; 2; 14	VLL; 1; 10	VLL; 2; 21	IMO; 1; 5	IMO; 2; 13	SPA; 1; 6	SPA; 2; 3	HOC; 1; 20	HOC; 2; 11	MIS; 1; 18	MIS; 2; 5	VAR; 12	MNZ; 1 Ret	MNZ; 2; 10	10th	56
2007	Epsilon Red Bull Team	VLL1; 1; 12	VLL1; 2; 5	**VLL2**; **1** Ret	**VLL2**; **2**; 1	SPA; 1; 18	**SPA**; **2**; 1	VAL; 1; 2	VAL; 2; 1	MIS; 1; 10	MIS; 2 Ret	MUG; 1; 3	MUG; 2; 3	MNZ; 1; 6	MNZ; 2; 2		2nd	266

=== Complete British Formula Three Championship results ===
(key) (Races in bold indicate pole position, races in italics indicate fastest lap)

Year	Team	Chassis	Engine	1	2	3	4	5	6	7	8	9	10	11	12	13	14	15	16	17	18	19	20	21	22	Pos	Points
2008	Carlin Motorsport	Dallara F308	Mercedes HWA	**OUL**; **1** Ret	**OUL**; **2**; 1	CRO; 1; 6	CRO; 2; 5	MNZ; 1; 12	MNZ; 2; 6	ROC; 1; 3	**ROC**; **2**; 2	SNE; 1; 2	SNE; 2; 3	**THR**; **1** Ret	THR; 2; 3	**BRH**; **1**; 1	BRH; 2; 4	SPA; 1; 3	SPA; 2; 4	SIL; 1; 5	SIL; 2; 6	BUC; 1; 3	BUC; 2; 1	**DON**; **1**; 1	DON; 2; 1	1st	251

=== Complete Spanish Formula Three Championship results ===
(key) (Races in bold indicate pole position, races in italics indicate fastest lap)

Year	Team	1	2	3	4	5	6	7	8	9	10	11	12	13	14	15	16	17	Pos	Points
2008	GTA Motor Competición	JAR; 1; 1	JAR; 2; 5	SPA; 1	SPA; 2	ALB; 1	ALB; 2	**VSC**; **1**; 1	VSC; 2; 4	VF1	MAG; 1 NC	MAG; 2 NC	**VAL**; **1**; 1	VAL; 2; 3	JER; 1	JER; 2	CAT; 1	CAT; 2	7th	60

=== Complete Formula Renault 3.5 Series results ===
(key) (Races in bold indicate pole position, races in italics indicate fastest lap)

Year	Team	1	2	3	4	5	6	7	8	9	10	11	12	13	14	15	16	17	Pos	Points
2009	Carlin Motorsport	CAT; 1; 5	CAT; 2; 16†	SPA; 1; 10	SPA; 2; 6	MON; 1; 6	HUN; 1; 5	HUN; 2; 16	SIL; 1; 6	SIL; 2; 9	BUG; 1; 4	BUG; 2; 3	ALG; 1; 3	**ALG**; **2**; 1	NÜR; 1; 5	NÜR; 2; 6	ARA; 1; 8	ARA; 2; 12	6th	88

† – Retired, but classified

=== Complete Formula One results ===
(key) (Races in bold indicate pole position; races in italics indicate fastest lap)

Year	Entrant	Chassis	Engine	1	2	3	4	5	6	7	8	9	10	11	12	13	14	15	16	17	18	19	WDC	Points
2009	Scuderia Toro Rosso	Toro Rosso STR4	Ferrari 056 2.4 V8	AUS	MAL	CHN	BHR	ESP	MON	TUR	GBR	GER	HUN; 15	EUR; 16	BEL; Ret	ITA; Ret	SIN; Ret	JPN; Ret	BRA; 14	ABU; Ret			24th	0
2010	Scuderia Toro Rosso	Toro Rosso STR5	Ferrari 056 2.4 V8	BHR; 13	AUS; 11	MAL; 9	CHN; 13	ESP; 10	MON; 11	TUR; 12	CAN; 12	EUR; 13	GBR; Ret	GER; 15	HUN; Ret	BEL; 13	ITA; 15	SIN; 12	JPN; 11	KOR; 11	BRA; 11	ABU; 9	19th	5
2011	Scuderia Toro Rosso	Toro Rosso STR6	Ferrari 056 2.4 V8	AUS; 11	MAL; 14	CHN; Ret	TUR; 16	ESP; 16	MON; Ret	CAN; 8	EUR; 8	GBR; 10	GER; 12	HUN; 10	BEL; Ret	ITA; 7	SIN; 21†	JPN; 15	KOR; 7	IND; 8	ABU; 15	BRA; 11	14th	26

^{†} Did not finish, but was classified as he had completed more than 90% of the race distance.

=== Complete Formula E results ===
(key) (Races in bold indicate pole position; races in italics indicate fastest lap)

Year	Team	Chassis	Powertrain	1	2	3	4	5	6	7	8	9	10	11	Pos	Points
2014–15	Virgin Racing	Spark SRT01-e	SRT01-e	BEI; 11	PUT; 9	PDE; 5	BUE; 4	MIA; 11	LBH; 8	MCO; Ret	BER; 12	MSC; 13	LDN	LDN	13th	30

=== Complete Stock Car Brasil results ===
Year	Team	Car	1	2	3	4	5	6	7	8	9	10	11	12	13	14	15	16	17	18	19	20	21	Rank	Points	Ref
2015	RZ Motorsport	Peugeot 408	GOI; 1; 16	RBP; 1	RBP; 2	VEL; 1	VEL; 2	CUR; 1	CUR; 2	SCZ; 1	SCZ; 2	CUR; 1	CUR; 2	GOI; 1	CAS; 1	CAS; 2	BRA; 1	BRA; 2	CUR; 1	CUR; 2	TAR; 1	TAR; 2	INT; 1	NC†	0†	

^{†} Ineligible for championship points.

== Notes ==
Sporting positions
Preceded by Atte Mustonen	Formula Renault Italia Winter Series; Champion; 2006	Succeeded by César Ramos
Preceded by Marko Asmer	British Formula Three Champion; 2008	Succeeded by Daniel Ricciardo
Preceded by Lucas di Grassi	Desafio Internacional das Estrelas; Winner; 2011	Succeeded by Jules Bianchi (2013)
Records
Preceded by Mike Thackwell; 19 years, 182 days (1980 Canadian GP)	Youngest driver to start a Formula One race 19 years, 125 days (2009 Hungarian Grand Prix)	Succeeded by Max Verstappen; 17 years, 166 days (2015 Australian GP)
