= Alexandre Sarnes Negrão =

Brazilian racing driver (born 1985)

- Nationality: (Brazil) Brazilian
- Born: October 14, 1985 (age 41)

FIA GT1 World Championship career
- Debut season: 2010
- Current team: Vitaphone Racing Team
- Categorisation: FIA Gold (until 2017); FIA Silver (2018–)
- Starts: 2
- Wins: 1
- Poles: 1
- Fastest laps: 0
- Best finish: 24th in 2010

Previous series
- 2005–2007 2003–2004: GP2 Series; Formula Three Sudamericana

Championship titles
- 2004: Formula Three Sudamericana

24 Hours of Le Mans career
- Years: 2008
- Teams: Vitaphone Racing Team
- Best finish: DNF (2008)

Alexandre Sarnes Negrão (Portuguese: [alekˈsɐ̃dɾi ˈsaʁnes neˈɡɾɐ̃w̃]; born October 14, 1985), better known as Xande Negrão and nicknamed Xandinho, is a Brazilian entrepreneur and race car driver. He raced in the first three seasons of the GP2 Series, all with the Piquet Sports team, having won the Formula Three Sudamericana championship in 2004.

== Career ==
Negrão's career started in karting in 1998, where he continued to race until he joined the Piquet team in Formula Three Sudamericana for the 2003 season. The team had been put together primarily to help Nelson Piquet Jr.'s run through the lower series, his goal to make Formula One, but nevertheless Negrão would stay with team in 2004. He ended the 2004 season as the champion, and also got a taste of British Formula Three that year, in the form of two races for the Carlin Motorsport team.

Negrão moved up to the GP2 Series for its inaugural season in 2005, alongside Piquet in his family-sponsored team. He scored only four points, but improved to thirteen in 2006, as Piquet unsuccessfully fought with Lewis Hamilton for the championship. Piquet moved to the Renault F1 team in for 2007 as the outfit's test driver, so Negrão was expected to lead his former GP2 team. However, Negrão had a very disappointing season, scoring fewer points than the previous year and being outscored by his rookie teammate Roldán Rodríguez. He was not retained for 2008. At the time of his departure from GP2, he was the only driver to have entered every GP2 race thus contested. He also held the record for most GP2 starts, which has subsequently been surpassed by Giorgio Pantano.

Negrão competed in four races for A1 Team Brazil in the 2007–08 A1 Grand Prix season, and later moved to sports car racing for 2008. He drove for the Vitaphone Racing Team in the FIA GT Championship, and participated in the 2008 Le Mans 24 Hours race.

== Personal life ==
Negrão was married to Brazilian actress Marina Ruy Barbosa between October 2017 and January 2021, when the couple filed for divorce.

== Racing record ==
=== Career summary ===
Season	Series	Team	Races	Wins	Poles	F/laps	Points	Position
2003	Formula 3 Sudamericana	Piquet Sports	18	2	2	0	151	**3rd**
2004	Formula 3 Sudamericana	Piquet Sports	18	10	7	9	240	**1st**
2004	British Formula 3 International Series	Carlin Motorsport	2	0	0	0	1	19th
2005	GP2 Series	Piquet Sports	23	0	0	0	4	19th
2006	GP2 Series	Piquet Sports	21	0	0	0	13	13th
2007	GP2 Series	Piquet Sports	21	0	0	1	8	20th
2008	24 Hours of Le Mans	Vitaphone Racing Team/Strakka Racing	1	0	0	0	N/A	DNF
2009	Stock Car Brasil	Medley-A.Mattheis	12	0	0	0	66	12th
2010	Stock Car Brasil	A.Mattheis Motorsport	11	0	0	0	52	13th
2011	Stock Car Brasil	Medley Full Time	12	0	0	0	25	18th
2012	Stock Car Brasil	Medley Full Time	12	0	0	0	37	26th

=== Complete Formula Three Sudamericana results ===
(key) (Races in bold indicate pole position) (Races in italics indicate fastest lap)

Year	Entrant	Chassis	Engine	1	2	3	4	5	6	7	8	9	10	11	12	13	14	15	16	17	18	DC	Points
2003	Piquet Sports	Dallara F301	Mugen-Honda	CAM; 1 Ret	**CAM**; **2**; 1	RDJ; 1; 8	RDJ; 2; 3	PAR; 1; 5	PAR; 2; 15	INT; 1 Ret	INT; 2; 7	OBE; 1; 5	OBE; 2; 6	CUR; 1; 4	CUR; 2; 4	LON; 1; 6	LON; 2; 2	CAS; 1; 2	CAS; 2; 7	BRA; 1; 4	**BRA**; **2**; 1	3rd	151
2004	Piquet Sports	Dallara F301	Mugen-Honda	**BRA**; **1**; 1	**BRA**; **2**; 1	PAL; 1; 1	PAL; 2 Ret	COR; 1; 4	**COR**; **2**; 1	PAR; 1; 5	PAR; 2 Ret	**CUR**; **1**; 1	**CUR**; **2**; 1	**RDJ**; **1**; 1	RDJ; 2; 1	**CUR**; **1**; 1	CUR; 2; 1					1st	240
2004	Piquet Sports	Dallara F301	Berta															INT; 1; 3	INT; 2; 6	INT; 3; 7	INT; 4 Ret	1st	240

=== Complete British Formula Three Championship results ===
(key) (Races in bold indicate pole position) (Races in italics indicate fastest lap)

Year	Entrant	Chassis	Engine	1	2	3	4	5	6	7	8	9	10	11	12	13	14	15	16	17	18	19	20	21	22	23	24	DC	Points
2004	Carlin Motorsport	Dallara F304	Mugen-Honda	DON; 1	DON; 2	SIL; 1	SIL; 2	CRO; 1	CRO; 2	KNO; 1	KNO; 2	SNE; 1	SNE; 2	CAS; 1	CAS; 2	DON; 1	DON; 2	OUL; 1	OUL; 2	SIL; 1	SIL; 2	THR; 1	THR; 2	SPA; 1; 11	SPA; 2; 12	BRH; 1	BRH; 2	19th	1

=== Complete GP2 Series results ===
(key) (Races in bold indicate pole position) (Races in italics indicate fastest lap)

Year	Entrant	1	2	3	4	5	6	7	8	9	10	11	12	13	14	15	16	17	18	19	20	21	22	23	DC	Points
2005	Hitech Piquet Sports	IMO; FEA; Ret	IMO; SPR; 13	CAT; FEA; 8	CAT; SPR; 15	MON; FEA; 12†	NÜR; FEA; Ret	NÜR; SPR; Ret	MAG; FEA; Ret	MAG; SPR; 13	SIL; FEA; 19	SIL; SPR; 16†	HOC; FEA; Ret	HOC; SPR; 18	HUN; FEA; 8	HUN; SPR; 15	IST; FEA; 12	IST; SPR; 19	MNZ; FEA; Ret	MNZ; SPR; 13	SPA; FEA; 7	SPA; SPR; 7	BHR; FEA; 12	BHR; SPR; 9	19th	4
2006	Piquet Sports	VAL; FEA; 13	VAL; SPR; 7	IMO; FEA; Ret	IMO; SPR; 11	NÜR; FEA; 7	NÜR; SPR; 7	CAT; FEA; 7	CAT; SPR; 18	MON; FEA; Ret	SIL; FEA; Ret	SIL; SPR; 12	MAG; FEA; 5	MAG; SPR; Ret	HOC; FEA; 16	HOC; SPR; 9	HUN; FEA; 5	HUN; SPR; Ret	IST; FEA; 8	IST; SPR; Ret	MNZ; FEA; Ret	MNZ; SPR; Ret			13th	13
2007	Minardi Piquet Sports	BHR; FEA; Ret	BHR; SPR; 15	CAT; FEA; Ret	CAT; SPR; DNS	MON; FEA; 15	MAG; FEA; Ret	MAG; SPR; Ret	SIL; FEA; Ret	SIL; SPR; 18	NÜR; FEA; 12	NÜR; SPR; 10	HUN; FEA; Ret	HUN; SPR; 13	IST; FEA; 7	IST; SPR; 2	MNZ; FEA; 14	MNZ; SPR; Ret	SPA; FEA; 19†	SPA; SPR; 16	VAL; FEA; 15	VAL; SPR; 18			20th	8

=== Complete A1 Grand Prix results ===
(key) (Races in bold indicate pole position; races in italics indicate fastest lap)

Year	Entrant	1	2	3	4	5	6	7	8	9	10	11	12	13	14	15	16	17	18	19	20	DC	Points
2007–08	Brazil	NED; SPR	NED; FEA	CZE; SPR	CZE; FEA	MLY; SPR	MLY; FEA	ZHU; SPR	ZHU; FEA	NZL; SPR	NZL; FEA	AUS; SPR	AUS; FEA	RSA; SPR	RSA; FEA	MEX; SPR	MEX; FEA	SHA; SPR; 14	SHA; FEA; 13	GBR; SPR; 16	GBR; FEA; 14	14th	44

=== Complete FIA GT Championship results ===
(key) (Races in bold indicate pole position; races in italics indicate fastest lap)

Year	Entrant	Car	Engine	Class	1	2	3	4	5	6	7	8	9	10	11	DC	Points
2008	Vitaphone Racing Team	Maserati MC12 GT1	Maserati M144B/2 6.0 L V12	GT1	SIL; 7	MON; 2	ADR; 10	OSC; 4	SPA; 2	BUC; 4	BUC; 2	BRN; 7	NOG; 1	ZOL; 6	SAN; Ret	3rd	52.5

=== 24 Hours of Le Mans results ===
Year	Team	Co-Drivers	Car	Class	Laps	Pos.	Class Pos.
2008	(Germany) Vitaphone Racing Team (United Kingdom) Strakka Racing	(United Kingdom) Peter Hardman (United Kingdom) Nick Leventis	Aston Martin DBR9	GT1	82	DNF	DNF

=== Complete Stock Car Brasil results ===
(key) (Races in bold indicate pole position) (Races in italics indicate fastest lap)

Year	Team	Car	1	2	3	4	5	6	7	8	9	10	11	12	Pos	Points
2009	Medley-A.Mattheis	Chevrolet Vectra	INT; 10	CTB; 8	BSB; Ret	SCZ; 9	INT; Ret	SAL; 5	RIO; 6	CGD; 10	CTB; Ret	BSB; 12	TAR; 15	INT; 5	12th	66
2010	A.Mattheis Motorsport	Chevrolet Vectra	INT; 15	CTB; Ret	VEL; 8	RIO; 13	RBP; 14	SAL; 22	INT; DNS	CGD; DSQ	LON; Ret	SCZ; 7	BSB; 7	CTB; 2	13th	52
2011	Medley Full Time	Peugeot 408	CTB; Ret	INT; Ret	RBP; 7	VEL; 18	CGD; 10	RIO; Ret	INT; 6	SAL; 21	SCZ; 16	LON; 23	BSB; DSQ	VEL; 19	18th	25
2012	Medley Full Time	Peugeot 408	INT; 20	CTB; 25	VEL; Ret	RBP; Ret	LON; 23	RIO; 23	SAL; 12	CGD; 15	TAR; 22	CTB; 20	BSB; 15	INT; 18	26th	37

Sporting positions
Preceded by Danilo Dirani	Formula Three Sudamericana Champion; 2004	Succeeded by Alberto Valerio
