= Luciano Burti =

Brazilian racing driver (born 1975)

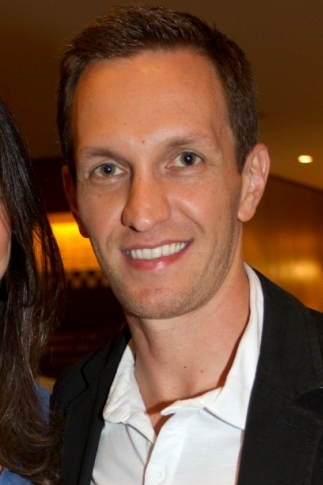
- Burti in 2010
- Born: Luciano Pucci Burti; 5 March 1975 (age 51); São Paulo, Brazil

Formula One World Championship career
- Nationality: (Brazil) Brazilian
- Active years: 2000–2001
- Team(s): Jaguar, Prost
- Entries: 15 (14 starts)
- Championships: 0
- Wins: 0
- Podiums: 0
- Career points: 0
- Pole positions: 0
- Fastest laps: 0
- First entry: 2000 Austrian Grand Prix
- Last entry: 2001 Belgian Grand Prix

Luciano Pucci Burti (born 5 March 1975) is a Brazilian former racing driver who raced in Formula One in 2000 and 2001. He was later a commentator for TV Globo.

== Early career ==
Burti's early career saw him graduate through the usual channels and he found himself in British Formula 3 driving for the crack Stewart Racing team. In his second season of F3 in 1999 he finished runner-up to Marc Hynes, but it was third-placed Jenson Button who would go on to achieve stardom in Formula One. Burti impressed when testing the Stewart F1 car that season and became Jaguar's tester for 2000, mainly down to the lobbying of Jackie Stewart, the outgoing team-boss.

== Formula One career ==
=== 2000–2001 ===
A surprise Grand Prix début came on 16 July 2000 at the Austrian Grand Prix, when he was called up at short notice as a replacement for the ill Eddie Irvine. Having tested consistently well for Jaguar in the 2000 Formula One season and with a race start already under his belt, he was promoted to the race team alongside Irvine in 2001, replacing the retiring Johnny Herbert. However, he fell out of favour after just four races, and was replaced by ex-Arrows driver Pedro de la Rosa.

Burti found a seat immediately at Prost, where the underperforming Gastón Mazzacane had been sacked. Burti raced competently for Prost and recorded his highest finish - eighth place - at the Canadian Grand Prix; he also occasionally qualified ahead of his highly experienced teammate Jean Alesi. However, his most notable moment in the first half of the season was an accident at the German Grand Prix - unable to avoid the slowing Ferrari of Michael Schumacher, whose gearbox had failed seconds after the race start, Burti struck the back of Schumacher's car, launching his Prost into a destructive cartwheel over the Arrows of Enrique Bernoldi. None of the three drivers were injured and all took the restarted race, from which Burti spun out on the 23rd lap.

==== Crash at 2001 Belgian Grand Prix ====
Two races later he had a more serious crash at the Belgian Grand Prix when his car touched with Eddie Irvine as he attempted to overtake the Northern Irishman. The front wing became lodged under Burti's front wheels, leaving him unable to brake or steer into the 190 mph Blanchimont corner; the impact with the tire barrier was so great that segments of the barrier were thrown into the air, landing on Burti's cockpit and knocking him unconscious. Irvine, after suffering a sizeable impact himself, subsequently helped the marshals in their attempt to extract Burti from his car. The crash forced him to sit out the rest of the season with facial bruising and a concussion. His seat was taken by Czech rookie Tomáš Enge.

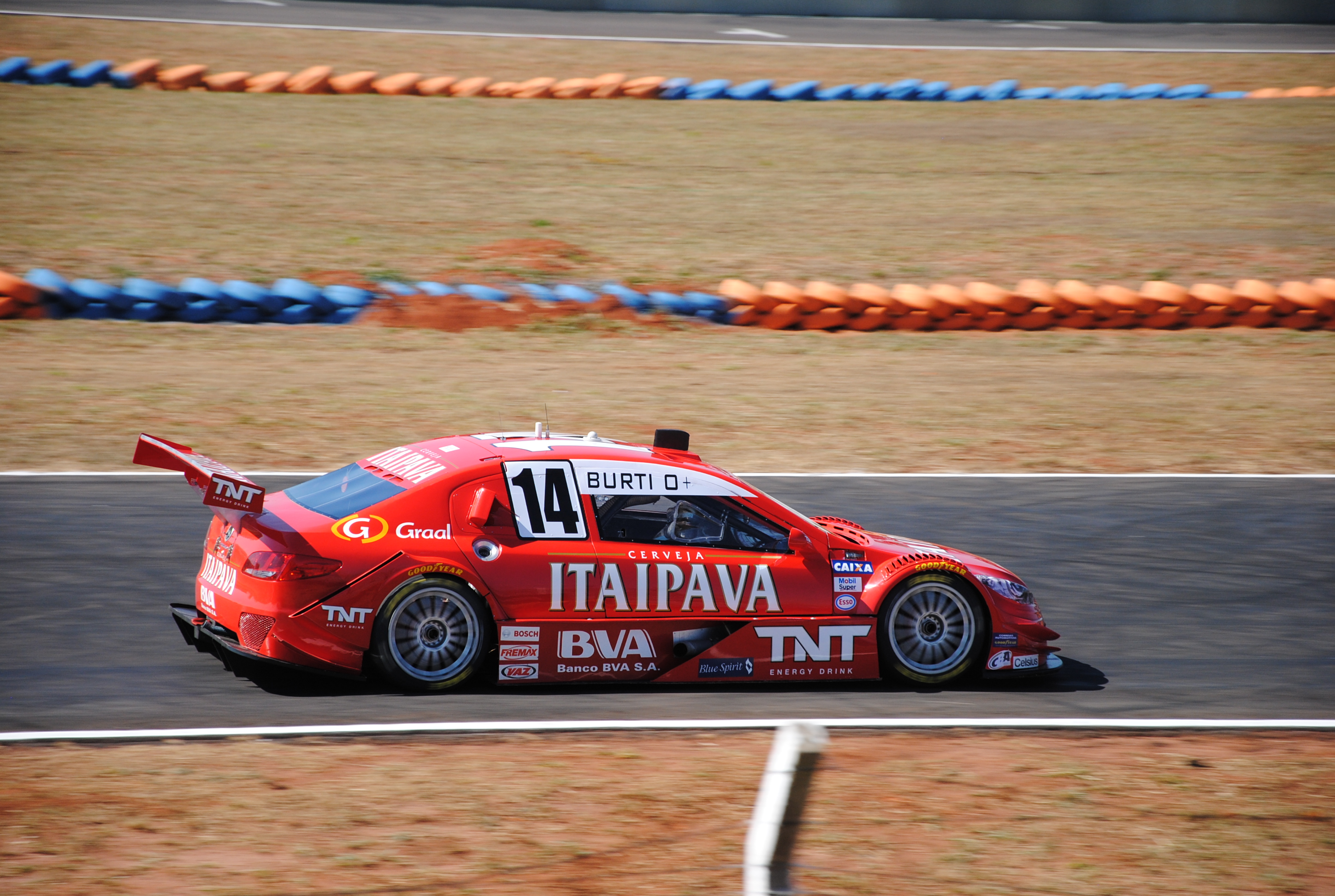
Burti during the 2011 Stock Car Brasil Championship

=== 2002–2004 ===
Burti subsequently signed to test for the Ferrari team, but that came to an end at the end of his contract in 2004. Over the course of his Formula One career, he scored no championship points. He has since returned to Brazil, where he competes in Stock Car Brasil and commentates on Formula One races for TV Globo.

== Karting record ==
=== Karting career summary ===
Season	Series	Position
1994	World Championship — Formula A	8th
2006	Desafio Internacional das Estrelas	10th
2007	Desafio Internacional das Estrelas	2nd
2008	Desafio Internacional das Estrelas	18th
2009	Desafio Internacional das Estrelas	23rd
2010	Desafio Internacional das Estrelas	12th
2011	Desafio Internacional das Estrelas	8th

== Racing record ==
=== Racing career summary ===
Season	Series	Team	Races	Wins	Poles	F/Laps	Podiums	Points	Position
1996	Formula Vauxhall Junior	Martin Donnelly Racing	15	4	?	?	4	116	3rd
1996	Formula Vauxhall Winter Series	Paul Stewart Racing	2	1	?	?	?	?	?
1997	Formula Vauxhall	PSR	12	4	?	?	7	84	1st
1998	British Formula Three Championship	Stewart Racing	15	2	3	1	7	132	3rd
1998	Masters of Formula 3	Paul Stewart Racing	1	0	0	0	0	N/A	9th
1998	Macau Grand Prix	Paul Stewart Racing	1	0	0	0	0	N/A	NC†
1998	Formula One	HSBC Stewart Ford	Test driver						
1999	Formula One	HSBC Stewart Ford	Test driver						
1999	British Formula Three Championship	Stewart Racing	15	5	5	4	13	209	2nd
1999	Macau Grand Prix	Paul Stewart Racing	1	0	0	0	0	N/A	19th
1999	Korea Super Prix	Stewart Racing	1	0	0	0	0	N/A	8th
2000	Formula One	Jaguar Racing F1 Team	1	0	0	0	0	0	NC†
2001	Formula One	Jaguar Racing F1 Team	4	0	0	0	0	0	20th
2001	Formula One	Prost Acer	9	0	0	0	0	0	20th
2002	Formula One	Scuderia Ferrari Marlboro	Test driver						
2003	Formula One	Scuderia Ferrari Marlboro	Test driver						
2003	FIA GT Championship - N-GT	JMB Racing	1	0	0	0	0	6	33rd
2004	Formula One	Scuderia Ferrari Marlboro	Test driver						
2005	Formula One	BMW Williams F1 Team	Test driver						
2005	Stock Car Brasil	Eurofarma RC	12	0	0	0	2	79	5th
2005	TC2000 Argentina	Ford-YPF	1	1	1	0	1	0	NC†
2005	Maserati Trofeo World Finals		2	0	0	0	0	0	NC†
2006	TC2000 Argentina	Toyota Team Argentina	1	0	0	0	0	0	NC†
2006	Stock Car Brasil	Petrobras-Action Power	12	0	2	1	1	18	25th
2006	Porsche Supercup	Morellato Stars Team	1	0	0	0	0	0	NC
2007	GT3 Brasil Championship	Boni Sports	1	0	0	0	0	0	NC†
2007	Stock Car Brasil	Cimed Racing	12	0	0	0	1	45	17th
2008	Stock Car Brasil	Sky Racing	12	0	0	0	1	52	12th
2009	Stock Car Brasil	Boettger Competições	12	1	0	0	2	258	5th
2010	Stock Car Brasil	Itaipava Racing Team	12	0	0	0	0	41	18th
2011	Stock Car Brasil	Itaipava Racing Team	12	1	1	1	1	226	9th
2012	Stock Car Brasil	Itaipava Racing Team	12	0	0	2	1	117	11th
2013	Stock Car Brasil	Boettger Competições	12	0	0	0	0	94	12th
2014	Stock Car Brasil	Vogel Motorsport	20	0	0	1	2	91	19th
2015	Stock Car Brasil	RZ Motorsport	21	0	0	0	1	93	19th
2016	Stock Car Brasil	RZ Motorsport	3	0	0	0	0	11	33rd
2016	Porsche Endurance Series - Challenge		1	0	0	0	0	21	21st
2018	Copa Truck	RM Competições	2	0	0	1	2	34	22nd
2018	Stock Car Brasil	Texaco Racing	1	0	0	0	0	0	NC†

† As Burti was a guest driver, he was ineligible for points.

== Racing results ==
=== Complete British Formula Three Championship results ===
(key)

Year	Team	Chassis	Engine	Class	1	2	3	4	5	6	7	8	9	10	11	12	13	14	15	16	DC	Points
1998	Stewart Racing	Dallara F398	Mugen-Honda	A	DON; 3	THR; 5	SIL; Ret	BRH; 10	BRH; 1	OUL; 3	SIL; 2	CRO; 3	SNE; Ret	SIL; Ret	PEM; 5	PEM; 1	DON; 4	THR; 3	SPA; Ret	SIL; 6	3rd	137
1999	Stewart Racing	Dallara F399	Mugen-Honda	A	DON; 3	SIL; 3	THR; Ret	BRH; 1	BRH; 3	OUL; 1	CRO; 2	BRH; 2	SIL; 3	SNE; 1	PEM; 3	PEM; 8	DON; 3	SPA; 1	SIL; DSQ	THR; 1	2nd	209

=== Complete Formula One results ===
(key)

Year	Team	Chassis	Engine	1	2	3	4	5	6	7	8	9	10	11	12	13	14	15	16	17	WDC	Points
2000	Jaguar Racing	Jaguar R1	Cosworth CR2 V10	AUS	BRA	SMR	GBR	ESP	EUR	MON	CAN	FRA	AUT; 11	GER	HUN	BEL	ITA	USA	JPN	MAL	23rd	0
2001	Jaguar Racing	Jaguar R2	Cosworth CR3 V10	AUS; 8	MAL; 10	BRA; Ret	SMR; 11														20th	0
2001	Prost Grand Prix	Prost AP04	Acer V10					ESP; 11	AUT; 11	MON; Ret	CAN; 8	EUR; 12	FRA; 10	GBR; Ret	GER; Ret	HUN; Ret	BEL; DNS	ITA	USA	JPN	20th	0

=== Complete Stock Car Brasil results ===
Year	Team	Car	1	2	3	4	5	6	7	8	9	10	11	12	13	14	15	16	17	18	19	20	21	Rank	Points
2005	Eurofarma RC	Chevrolet Astra	INT; 3	CTB; Ret	RIO; 7	INT; 6	CTB; Ret	LON; 6	BSB; Ret	SCZ; Ret	TAR; Ret	ARG; 3	RIO; 8	INT; 6										5th	79
2006	Petrobras-Action Power	Volkswagen Bora	INT; Ret	CTB; 17	CGD; 19	INT; 20	LON; 14	CTB; 17	SCZ; 24	BSB; 23	TAR; Ret	ARG; 3	RIO; DSQ	INT; 23										25th	18
2007	Cimed-Action Power	Volkswagen Bora	INT; 14	CTB; 7	CGD; 9	INT; Ret	LON; Ret	SCZ; 2	CTB; 21	BSB; 24	ARG; 27	TAR; 9	RIO; Ret	INT; Ret										17th	45
2008	Sky-Action Power	Peugeot 307	INT; Ret	BSB; 11	CTB; 15	SCZ; DSQ	CGD; 6	INT; Ret	RIO; 2	LON; 29	CTB; 21	BSB; 15	TAR; 7	INT; 8										12th	52
2009	Boettger Competições	Chevrolet Vectra	INT; Ret	CTB; 15	BSB; 8	SCZ; 11	INT; 2	SAL; 4	RIO; 13	CGD; 8	CTB; 8	BSB; 7	TAR; 1	INT; 7										5th	257
2010	Itaipava Racing Team	Peugeot 307	INT; Ret	CTB; Ret	VEL; 7	RIO; Ret	RBP; Ret	SAL; 21	INT; 14	CGD; 7	LON; 7	SCZ; 5	BSB; Ret	CTB; Ret										18th	41
2011	Itaipava Racing Team	Peugeot 408	CTB; 5	INT; 12	RBP; Ret	VEL; Ret	CGD; 1	RIO; 20	INT; Ret	SAL; 4	SCZ; 10	LON; 7	BSB; 13	VEL; 16										9th	226
2012	Itaipava Racing Team	Peugeot 408	INT; 14	CTB; 7	VEL; Ret	RBP; 8	LON; 2	RIO; Ret	SAL; 3	CGD; 24	TAR; 13	CUR; 16	BRA; 5	INT; 15										11th	117
2013	Boettger Competições	Peugeot 408	INT; 8	CUR; 23	TAR; 12	SAL; 8	BRA; DSQ	CAS; 15	RBP; Ret	CAS; 6	VEL; 11	CUR; Ret	BRA; Ret	INT; 7										12th	94
2014	Vogel Motorsport	Chevrolet Sonic	INT; 1; 16	SCZ; 1 Ret	SCZ; 2 DNS	BRA; 1; 3	BRA; 2; 18	GOI; 1; 8	GOI; 2; 4	GOI; 1; 29	CAS; 1; 22	CAS; 2; 13	CUR; 1; 26	CUR; 2; 17	VEL; 1 Ret	VEL; 2 Ret	SCZ; 1 Ret	SCZ; 2 DNS	TAR; 1; 8	TAR; 2 Ret	SAL; 1; 5	SAL; 2; 3	CUR; 1 DSQ	19th	85
2015	RZ Motorsport	Chevrolet Sonic	GOI; 1; 16	RBP; 1; 19	RBP; 2; 5	VEL; 1 NC	VEL; 2; 13	CUR; 1; 12	CUR; 2; 16	SCZ; 1 NC	SCZ; 2; 11	CUR; 1; 20	CUR; 2; 13	GOI; 1 Ret	CAS; 1; 16	CAS; 2; 8	MOU; 1; 20	MOU; 2; 10	CUR; 1; 4	CUR; 2; 21	TAR; 1; 12	TAR; 2; 15	INT; 1; 11	19th	93
2016	RZ Motorsport	Chevrolet Cruze	CUR; 1; 30	VEL; 1; 13	VEL; 2; 20	GOI; 1	GOI; 2	SCZ; 1	SCZ; 2	TAR; 1	TAR; 2	CAS; 1	CAS; 2	INT; 1	LON; 1	LON; 2	CUR; 1	CUR; 2	GOI; 1	GOI; 2	CRI; 1	CRI; 2	INT; 1	33rd	11
2018	Full Time Bassani	Chevrolet Cruze	INT; 1 Ret	CUR; 1	CUR; 2	VEL; 1	VEL; 2	LON; 1	LON; 2	SCZ; 1	SCZ; 2	GOI; 1	MOU; 1	MOU; 2	CAS; 1	CAS; 2	VCA; 1	VCA; 2	TAR; 1	TAR; 2	GOI; 1	GOI; 2	INT; 1	NC†	0†

^{†} As Burti was a guest driver, he was ineligible for points.

== Sources ==
- Profile at www.grandprix.com

Sporting positions
Preceded by Gabriel Ponce de León; Patricio Di Palma	Winner of the 200 km de Buenos Aires; 2005; With: Diego Aventín	Succeeded by Matías Rossi; Alain Menu
