= 1988 Pau Grand Prix =

Race details
- Date: 23 May 1988
- Official name: XLVIII Pau Grand Prix
- Location: Pau, France
- Course: Temporary Street Circuit
- Course length: 2.760 km (1.720 miles)
- Distance: 72 laps, 198.72 km (123.84 miles)

Pole position
Driver	(Brazil) Roberto Moreno	Bromley Motorsport
- Time: 1:11.880

Fastest lap
Driver	(Italy) Marco Apicella	FIRST Racing
- Time: 1:12.72

Podium
First	(Brazil) Roberto Moreno	Bromley Motorsport
Second	(France) Jean Alesi	Oreca Motorsport
Third	(Italy) Pierluigi Martini	FIRST Racing

The 1988 Pau Grand Prix was a Formula 3000 motor race held on 23 May 1988 at the Pau circuit, in Pau, Pyrénées-Atlantiques, France. The race was run as part of the 1988 International Formula 3000 Championship.

== Entry list ==
Entrant	Chassis	Engine	No	Driver
(United Kingdom) Onyx Race Engineering	March 88B	Cosworth DFV	1	(Germany) Volker Weidler
(United Kingdom) Onyx Race Engineering	March 88B	Cosworth DFV	2	(Spain) Alfonso de Vinuesa
(United Kingdom) Ralt Racing Ltd.	Ralt RT22	Judd	3	(New Zealand) Mike Thackwell
(United Kingdom) Ralt Racing Ltd.	Ralt RT22	Judd	4	(France) Éric Bernard
(United Kingdom) Lola Motorsport	Lola T88/50	Cosworth DFV	5	(United Kingdom) Mark Blundell
(United Kingdom) Lola Motorsport	Lola T88/50	Cosworth DFV	6	(France) Paul Belmondo
(France) Oreca Motorsport	Reynard 88D	Cosworth DFV	7	(France) Pierre-Henri Raphanel
(France) Oreca Motorsport	Reynard 88D	Cosworth DFV	8	(France) Jean Alesi
(Italy) FIRST Racing	March 88B	Judd	9	(Italy) Pierluigi Martini
(Italy) FIRST Racing	March 88B	Judd	10	(Italy) Marco Apicella
(France) GBDA Motorsport	Lola T88/50	Cosworth DFV	11	(France) Michel Trollé
(France) GBDA Motorsport	Lola T88/50	Cosworth DFV	12	(France) Olivier Grouillard
(Italy) Pavesi Racing	Ralt RT22	Judd	14	(Italy) Massimo Monti
(Italy) Pavesi Racing	Ralt RT22	Judd	15	(Italy) Fabrizio Barbazza
(United Kingdom) Madgwick International	Reynard 88D	Cosworth DFV	16	(Netherlands) Cor Euser
(United Kingdom) Madgwick International	Reynard 88D	Cosworth DFV	17	(United Kingdom) Russell Spence
(Italy) Forti Corse	Dallara 3087	Cosworth DFV	18	(Italy) Enrico Bertaggia
(Italy) Forti Corse	Dallara 3087	Cosworth DFV	19	(Argentina) Fernando Croceri
(United Kingdom) Gary Evans Motorsport	Ralt RT22	Cosworth DFV	20	(United Kingdom) Gary Evans
(United Kingdom) Gary Evans Motorsport	Ralt RT22	Cosworth DFV	21	(United Kingdom) Andy Wallace
(United Kingdom) Roni Motorsport	March 88B	Cosworth DFV	23	(Japan) Aguri Suzuki
(United Kingdom) Team Racetech 3000	Lola T88/50	Cosworth DFV	24	(Austria) Pierre Chauvet
(United Kingdom) CoBRa Motorsport	Lola T88/50	Cosworth DFV	27	(Switzerland) Andrea Chiesa
(United Kingdom) GA Motorsport	Lola T88/50	Cosworth DFV	28	(Switzerland) Gregor Foitek
(United Kingdom) GA Motorsport	Lola T88/50	Cosworth DFV	29	(Italy) Claudio Langes
(Republic of Ireland) Eddie Jordan Racing	Reynard 88D	Cosworth DFV	30	(Sweden) Thomas Danielsson
(United Kingdom) Colt Racing	Lola T88/50	Cosworth DFV	32	(Finland) Jari Nurminen
(United Kingdom) Colt Racing	Lola T88/50	Cosworth DFV	33	(Italy) Giovanna Amati
(France) Sport Auto Racing	Lola T88/50	Cosworth DFV	35	(Switzerland) Jean-Denis Délétraz
(France) Sport Auto Racing	Lola T88/50	Cosworth DFV	36	(France) Fabien Giroix
(United Kingdom) Roger Cowman Racing	Lola T87/50	Cosworth DFV	37	(United Kingdom) David Hunt
(United Kingdom) Roger Cowman Racing	Lola T87/50	Cosworth DFV	38	(Italy) Franco Scapini
(Italy) Spirit Racing	Reynard 88D	Cosworth DFV	39	(Belgium) Bertrand Gachot
(Italy) Spirit Racing	Reynard 88D	Cosworth DFV	40	(Italy) Paolo Barilla
(Spain) Barcelona Motorsport	Lola T88/50	Cosworth DFV	41	(Spain) Fermín Vélez
(United Kingdom) Bromley Motorsport	Reynard 88D	Cosworth DFV	42	(Brazil) Roberto Moreno

== Classification ==
=== Qualifying ===
Pos	No	Driver	Team	Time	Grid
1	42	(Brazil) Roberto Moreno	Bromley Motorsport	1:10.860	1
2	7	(France) Pierre-Henri Raphanel	Oreca Motorsport	1:11.080	2
3	8	(France) Jean Alesi	Oreca Motorsport	1:11.260	3
4	9	(Italy) Pierluigi Martini	FIRST Racing	1:11.630	4
5	4	(France) Éric Bernard	Ralt Racing Ltd.	1:11.720	5
6	39	(Belgium) Bertrand Gachot	Spirit Racing	1:11.670	6
7	12	(France) Olivier Grouillard	GDBA Motorsport	1:12.060	7
8	11	(France) Michel Trollé	GDBA Motorsport	1:11.700	8
9	40	(Italy) Paolo Barilla	Spirit Racing	1:12.170	9
10	3	(New Zealand) Mike Thackwell	Ralt Racing Ltd.	1:11.930	10
11	16	(Netherlands) Cor Euser	Madgwick International	1:12.350	11
12	27	(Switzerland) Andrea Chiesa	CoBRa Motorsport	1:12.170	12
13	36	(France) Fabien Giroix	Sport Auto Racing	1:12.500	13
14	17	(United Kingdom) Russell Spence	Madgwick International	1:12.500	14
15	30	(Sweden) Thomas Danielsson	Eddie Jordan Racing	1:12.690	15
16	35	(Switzerland) Jean-Denis Délétraz	Sport Auto Racing	1:12.540	16
17	10	(Italy) Marco Apicella	FIRST Racing	1:12.710	17
18	29	(Italy) Claudio Langes	GA Motorsport	1:12.720	18
19	6	(France) Paul Belmondo	Lola Motorsport	1:12.710	19
20	5	(France) Mark Blundell	Lola Motorsport	1:12.750	20
21	29	(Austria) Pierre Chauvet	Team Racetech 3000	1:13.010	21
22	23	(Japan) Aguri Suzuki	Roni Motorsport	1:12.890	22
Did not qualify
-	21	(United Kingdom) Andy Wallace	Gary Evans Motorsport	1:12.900	-
-	18	(Italy) Enrico Bertaggia	Forti Corse	1:13.010	-
-	20	(United Kingdom) Gary Evans	Gary Evans Motorsport	1:13.240	-
-	1	(Germany) Volker Weidler	Onyx Race Engineering	1:13.520	-
-	15	(Italy) Fabrizio Barbazza	Pavesi Racing	1:13.670	-
-	28	(Switzerland) Gregor Foitek	GA Motorsport	1:13.680	-
-	41	(Spain) Fermín Vélez	Barcelona Motorsport	1:13.680	-
-	32	(Finland) Jari Nurminen	Colt Racing	1:13.980	-
-	19	(Argentina) Fernando Croceri	Forti Corse	1:14.010	-
-	37	(United Kingdom) David Hunt	Roger Cowman Racing	1:14.250	-
-	2	(Spain) Alfonso de Vinuesa	Onyx Race Engineering	1:14.400	-
-	38	(Italy) Franco Scapini	Roger Cowman Racing	1:14.660	-
-	14	(Italy) Massimo Monti	Pavesi Racing	1:15.940	-
-	33	(Italy) Giovanna Amati	Colt Racing	1:16.480	-

=== Race ===
Pos	No	Driver	Team	Laps	Time/retired	Grid	Pts
1	42	(Brazil) Roberto Moreno	Bromley Motorsport	72	1hr 29min 1.760sec	1	9
2	8	(France) Jean Alesi	Oreca Motorsport	72	+ 22.030 s	3	6
3	9	(Italy) Pierluigi Martini	FIRST Racing	72	+ 22.950 s	4	4
4	4	(France) Éric Bernard	Ralt Racing Ltd.	72	+ 23.460 s	5	3
5	10	(Italy) Marco Apicella	FIRST Racing	72	+ 24.540 s	17	2
6	7	(France) Pierre-Henri Raphanel	Oreca Motorsport	72	+ 52.480 s	2	1
7	3	(New Zealand) Mike Thackwell	Ralt Racing Ltd.	72		10	
8	36	(France) Fabien Giroix	Sport Auto Racing	71	+ 1 lap	13	
9	16	(Netherlands) Cor Euser	Madgwick International	71	+ 1 lap	11	
10	29	(Italy) Claudio Langes	GA Motorsport	71	+ 1 lap	18	
11	23	(Japan) Aguri Suzuki	Roni Motorsport	69	+ 3 laps	22	
Ret	12	(France) Olivier Grouillard	GBDA Motorsport	55	Accident	7	
Ret	11	(France) Michel Trollé	GBDA Motorsport	53	Accident	8	
Ret	17	(United Kingdom) Russell Spence	Madgwick International	50	Accident	14	
Ret	6	(France) Paul Belmondo	Lola Motorsport	45	Gearbox	19	
Ret	29	(Austria) Pierre Chauvet	Team Racetech 3000	41	Accident	24	
Ret	40	(Italy) Paolo Barilla	Spirit Racing	27	Accident	9	
Ret	5	(United Kingdom) Mark Blundell	Lola Motorsport	18	Handling	20	
Ret	27	(Switzerland) Andrea Chiesa	COBRA Motorsport	1	Accident	12	
Ret	35	(Switzerland) Jean-Denis Délétraz	Sport Auto Racing	1	Accident	16	
Ret	39	(Belgium) Bertrand Gachot	Spirit Racing	0	Accident	6	
DNS	30	(Sweden) Thomas Danielsson	Eddie Jordan Racing	0	Did not start	15	
Fastest Lap: Marco Apicella (FIRST Racing) – 1:12.72
