= 1984 FIA European Formula 3 Championship =

Open-wheel motor race series

Seasons
- ← 1983 none →

The 1984 FIA European Formula 3 Championship was the tenth edition of the FIA European Formula 3 Championship. The championship consisted of 15 rounds across the continent. The season was won by Italian Ivan Capelli, with Johnny Dumfries second and Gerhard Berger in third.

== Calendar ==
Round	Circuit	Date
1	(United Kingdom) Donington Park, Leicestershire	25 March
2	(Belgium) Circuit Zolder, Heusden-Zolder	15 April
3	(France) Circuit de Nevers Magny-Cours, Magny-Cours	1 May
4	(France) Circuit de la Châtre, La Châtre	13 May
5	(Austria) Österreichring, Spielberg	27 May
6	(United Kingdom) Silverstone Circuit, Silverstone	10 June
7	(West Germany) Nürburgring, Nürburg	17 June
8	(Italy) Autodromo Nazionale Monza, Monza	24 June
9	(Italy) Autodromo di Pergusa, Pergusa	8 July
10	(Italy) Mugello Circuit, Scarperia e San Piero	15 July
11	(Sweden) Ring Knutstorp, Kågeröd	19 August
12	(France) Circuit Paul Armagnac, Nogaro	16 September
13	(Spain) Circuito del Jarama, Madrid	21 October

== Results ==
Round	Circuit	Pole position	Fastest lap	Winning driver	Winning team	Report
1	(United Kingdom) Donington Park	(United Kingdom) Johnny Dumfries	(United Kingdom) Johnny Dumfries	(United Kingdom) Johnny Dumfries	David Price Racing	Report
2	(Belgium) Circuit Zolder	(United Kingdom) Johnny Dumfries	(Denmark) John Nielsen	(Denmark) John Nielsen	Volkswagen Motorsport	Report
3	(France) Circuit de Nevers Magny-Cours	(Denmark) John Nielsen	(Denmark) John Nielsen	(Italy) Ivan Capelli	Enzo Coloni Racing	Report
4	(France) Circuit de la Châtre	(Italy) Claudio Langes	(Italy) Ivan Capelli	(Italy) Ivan Capelli	Enzo Coloni Racing	Report
5	(Austria) Österreichring	(Austria) Gerhard Berger	(Austria) Gerhard Berger	(Austria) Gerhard Berger	Trivellato Racing Team	Report
6	(United Kingdom) Silverstone Circuit	(United Kingdom) Johnny Dumfries	(United Kingdom) Russell Spence	(United Kingdom) Johnny Dumfries	David Price Racing	Report
7	(West Germany) Nürburgring	(United Kingdom) Johnny Dumfries	(Italy) Ivan Capelli	(United Kingdom) Johnny Dumfries	David Price Racing	Report
8	(Italy) Autodromo Nazionale Monza	(Italy) Ivan Capelli	(Switzerland) Franco Forini	(Austria) Gerhard Berger	Trivellato Racing Team	Report
9	(Italy) Autodromo di Pergusa	(Italy) Ivan Capelli	(Italy) Ivan Capelli	(Italy) Ivan Capelli	Enzo Coloni Racing	Report
10	(Italy) Mugello Circuit	(United Kingdom) Johnny Dumfries	(Italy) Ivan Capelli	(Italy) Ivan Capelli	Enzo Coloni Racing	Report
11	(Sweden) Ring Knutstorp	(United Kingdom) Johnny Dumfries	(Denmark) Kris Nissen	(Italy) Claudio Langes	Barron Racing Team	Report
12	(France) Circuit Paul Armagnac	(Denmark) John Nielsen	(Denmark) John Nielsen	(Denmark) John Nielsen	Volkswagen Motorsport	Report
13	(Spain) Circuito del Jarama	(United Kingdom) Johnny Dumfries	(United Kingdom) Johnny Dumfries	(United Kingdom) Johnny Dumfries	David Price Racing	Report

== Championship standings ==
=== Drivers' championship ===
Pos	Driver	DON (United Kingdom)	ZOL (Belgium)	MAG (France)	LAC (France)	OST (Austria)	SIL (United Kingdom)	NÜR (West Germany)	MNZ (Italy)	PER (Italy)	MUG (Italy)	KNT (Sweden)	NOG (France)	JAR (Spain)	Pts
1	(Italy) Ivan Capelli		3	1	1	Ret	3	2	DSQ	1	1	Ret	2	3	60
2	(United Kingdom) Johnny Dumfries	1	2		2		1	1	Ret		4	Ret	4	1	54
3	(Austria) Gerhard Berger	4	4	7	3	1	4	3	1	3	2		3		49
4	(Italy) Claudio Langes	3	Ret		4	2	Ret	16	2	2	5	1	9	Ret	36
5	(Denmark) John Nielsen	6	1	2	Ret	3							1	2	35
6	(Republic of Ireland) Tommy Byrne	2	9	3	7	Ret	9	Ret	Ret	5	14	6	6		14
7	(Switzerland) Bernard Santal		7	13	Ret	4	Ret					3	5	4	12
8	(Italy) Ruggero Melgrati	8	DSQ	9	6	8	5	10	Ret	4	3	7	11	7	10
=	(Denmark) Kris Nissen	8	5	5	5	6	Ret	4				Ret			10
10	(Spain) Luis Pérez-Sala	12	8	19	Ret	13	14	Ret	7	7	11	2	8	5	8
11	(France) Cathy Muller	7	6	10	Ret	7	7	13	6	6	6	4	7		7
12	(United Kingdom) Russell Spence						2								6
13	(Spain) Adrián Campos			11	Ret	9	10	5	4	Ret	Ret	Ret		Ret	5
14	(Switzerland) Franco Forini								3						4
15	(United Kingdom) James Weaver			4											3
16	(United Kingdom) David Hunt	5					DSQ								2
=	(Italy) Walter Voulaz			Ret	Ret	5				Ret					2
=	(Italy) Fabrizio Barbazza								5						2
=	(Sweden) Leo Andersson											5			2
20	(France) Frederic Delavallade			6											1
=	(United Kingdom) Gary Evans						6								1
=	(Denmark) Kurt Thiim							6							1
=	(Sweden) Slim Borgudd											11		6	1
-	(United States) Davy Jones	Ret	Ret	Ret	Ret	14	Ret	7		Ret	17				0
-	(Italy) Gabriele Tarquini								17		7				0
-	(Sweden) Haase Thaung		14	15	8						13	8			0
-	(Switzerland) Jo Zeller		13	8		12									0
-	(West Germany) Peter Wisskirchen		Ret					8							0
-	(Italy) Alessandro Santin								Ret		8				0
-	(Spain) Carlos Abella						8							Ret	0
-	(Italy) Danilo Frassoni								8						0
-	(Spain) Luis Villamil	11	11	14	DSQ	11	13	9	10	8	12	10	13	Ret	0
-	(Italy) Cosimo Lucchesi		16	18	Ret	10	12	11	Ret	Ret	9	Ret	Ret	11	0
-	(Peru) Neto Jochamowitz								9						0
-	(Sweden) Steven Andskär											9			0
-	(France) Christian Estrosi	15	18	17	10										0
-	(Italy) Marco Apicella								Ret		10				0
-	(United Kingdom) Tony Trevor	10													0
-	(New Zealand) Paul Radisich		10												0
-	(France) Jean-Pierre Hoursourigaray												10		0
-	(Argentina) Juan Manuel Fangio II								11					Ret	0
-	(Spain) Emilio Zapico													11	0
-	(New Zealand) Rob Wilson						11								0
-	(Austria) Franz Konrad	13						12							0
-	(France) Paul Belmondo			12									Ret		0
-	(West Germany) Volker Weidler		12												0
-	(Italy) Giorgio Montaldo								12						0
-	(West Germany) Lars Schneider											12			0
-	(Spain) Ricardo Galiano												12	9	0
-	(United States) Joe Sulentic								13						0
-	(Sweden) Christer Offason											13			0
-	(Switzerland) Urs Dudler	14	Ret			15									0
-	(Sweden) Mikael Nabrink	16	17	20				14				16			0
-	(Italy) Luca Melgrati								14						0
-	(Sweden) Thomas Danielsson											14			0
-	(Italy) Giacomo Vismara								15		16				0
-	(Netherlands) Hendrik ten Cate		15												0
-	(West Germany) Karl-Heinz Wieschalla							15							0
-	(Italy) Giovanna Amati										15				0
-	(Denmark) Nettan Lindgren-Jansson											15			0
-	(France) Olivier Grouillard			16											0
-	(West Germany) "Ludwig"								16						0
-	(Sweden) Mats Karlsson	17										Ret			0
-	(West Germany) Wolfgang Kaufmann							17							0
-	(Sweden) Sonny Johansson											17			0
-	(Finland) Reima Södermann	18													0
-	(Italy) Antonio Padrone								18						0
-	(Italy) Ernesto Catella										18				0
-	(Netherlands) John Bosch	Ret	19												0
-	(Italy) Paolo Giangrossi								19		Ret				0
-	(Belgium) Phillip Daniels	19													0
-	(Finland) Harri Kangas		20												0
-	(France) Gerard Dilman			21											0
-	(United Kingdom) Ronnie Grant	Ret													0
-	(West Germany) Stefan Oberndorfer		Ret												0
-	(Austria) Walter Lechner					Ret									0
-	(United Kingdom) Andrew Gilbert-Scott						Ret								0
-	(West Germany) Heinz Gilges							Ret							0
-	(West Germany) Harald Brutschin							Ret							0
-	(Italy) Marco Melito								Ret						0
-	(Italy) Maurizio Manfredi								Ret						0
-	(Italy) Nino Fama								Ret						0
-	(Italy) Giovanni Bertaccini										Ret				0
-	(Sweden) Jan-Olov Tingdahl											Ret			0
-	(Sweden) Hakan Olausson											Ret			0
-	(Sweden) Joakim Lindström											Ret			0
-	(Spain) Alfonso de Vinuesa													Ret	0
Pos	Driver	DON (United Kingdom)	ZOL (Belgium)	MAG (France)	LAC (France)	OST (Austria)	SIL (United Kingdom)	NÜR (West Germany)	MNZ (Italy)	PER (Italy)	MUG (Italy)	KNT (Sweden)	NOG (France)	JAR (Spain)	Pts
