= 1989 International Formula 3000 Championship =

Motor racing competition

1989 FIA International Formula 3000 Championship

Seasons
- ← 1988 1990 →

The 1989 International Formula 3000 Championship was contested over 10 rounds. Jean Alesi won the title, while also competing in the last half of the Formula One season for Tyrrell.

== Season summary ==
The season began with Thomas Danielsson winning at Silverstone, after returning from the eye problems that had caused him to miss most of the previous year.

Martin Donnelly then won on the road at Vallelunga, but was disqualified. His Eddie Jordan Racing team had modified the Reynard's nosecone, but it had not been subjected to the mandatory crash test.

At the Pau Grand Prix, Éric Bernard led the two EJR cars of Jean Alesi and Donnelly after an aborted first start. However, Bernard was caught behind an accident involving Paul Belmondo and stalled his car, allowing Alesi to go through and take the victory. Bernard stormed back through the field, but collided with Mark Blundell while battling for second place. Bernard would win the next race at Jerez. Andrea Chiesa then won a close race on the dusty Enna circuit.

Meanwhile, three F3000 regulars—Alesi, Bernard and Donnelly—all made their Formula One debuts at the French Grand Prix in July. Alesi was particularly impressive for Tyrrell, finishing fourth, and he would continue to drive for them when the F3000 schedule allowed.

The EJR team won the next three races, allowing Alesi to take a commanding lead in the championship. His closest rival Érik Comas won at Le Mans but Alesi's single point, along with the tiebreaker of most wins, meant that he clinched the title. Alesi then skipped the last round in at Dijon-Prenois to race in the Japanese Grand Prix, allowing Comas to tie his point total with the win.

== Drivers and teams ==
Team	Chassis	Engine	No.	Drivers	Rounds
(United Kingdom) Bromley Motorsport	Reynard 89D	Ford Cosworth	1	(Brazil) Marco Greco	6
(United Kingdom) Bromley Motorsport	Reynard 89D	Ford Cosworth	2	(Australia) Gary Brabham	1–2, 4
(United Kingdom) Bromley Motorsport	Reynard 89D	Ford Cosworth	2	(Netherlands) Cor Euser	8
(United Kingdom) Bromley Motorsport	Reynard 89D	Ford Cosworth	2	(France) David Velay	10
(Republic of Ireland) Eddie Jordan Racing	Reynard 89D	Mugen Honda	3	(United Kingdom) Martin Donnelly	All
(Republic of Ireland) Eddie Jordan Racing	Reynard 89D	Mugen Honda	4	(France) Jean Alesi	1–9
(Republic of Ireland) Eddie Jordan Racing	Reynard 89D	Mugen Honda	4	(Sweden) Rickard Rydell	10
(Italy) First Racing	Reynard 89D	Judd	5	(Switzerland) Jean-Denis Délétraz	All
(Italy) First Racing	Reynard 89D	Judd	6	(Italy) Marco Apicella	All
(Italy) First Racing	March 89B	Judd	7	(Italy) Fabrizio Giovanardi	All
(Italy) GA Motorsport	March 89B	Judd	8	(Switzerland) Philippe Favre	1–8
(Italy) GA Motorsport	March 89B	Judd	8	(Brazil) Marco Greco	9–10
(Italy) GA Motorsport	March 89B	Judd	9	(France) Jacques Goudchaux	1–9
(Italy) GA Motorsport	March 89B	Judd	9	(United Kingdom) Andrew Gilbert-Scott	10
(Italy) GA Motorsport	Lola T89/50	Ford Cosworth	21	(Belgium) Eric van de Poele	All
(Italy) GA Motorsport	Lola T89/50	Ford Cosworth	22	(Canada) Stéphane Proulx	All
(Italy) Lola Motorsport	March 88B	Judd	10	(Italy) Enrico Bertaggia	1
(Italy) Lola Motorsport	March 88B	Judd	11	(Italy) Mauro Martini	1
(United Kingdom) Racetech 3000	Reynard 89D	Ford Cosworth	12	(France) Didier Artzet	1–3
(United Kingdom) Madgwick International	Reynard 89D	Ford Cosworth	16	(Sweden) Thomas Danielsson	All
(United Kingdom) Madgwick International	Reynard 89D	Ford Cosworth	17	(United Kingdom) Gary Evans	All
(United Kingdom) CoBRa Motorsports	Reynard 89D	Ford Cosworth	18	(United Kingdom) Ross Hockenhull	1, 4, 6–7
(United Kingdom) CoBRa Motorsports	Reynard 89D	Ford Cosworth	18	(France) Alain Ferté	2–3
(United Kingdom) CoBRa Motorsports	Reynard 89D	Ford Cosworth	19	(Portugal) Pedro Chaves	All
(United Kingdom) CoBRa Motorsports	Reynard 89D	Ford Cosworth	20	(France) Michel Ferté	5
(United Kingdom) CoBRa Motorsports	Reynard 89D	Ford Cosworth	20	(France) Alain Ferté	8–10
(Japan) Footwork	Mooncraft MC041	Mugen Honda	23	(Japan) Ukyo Katayama	1–4
(Japan) Footwork	Mooncraft MC041	Mugen Honda	23	(United Kingdom) Damon Hill	5–10
(United Kingdom) Pacific Racing	Reynard 89D	Mugen Honda	24	(United Kingdom) Eddie Irvine	All
(United Kingdom) Pacific Racing	Reynard 89D	Mugen Honda	25	(Finland) JJ Lehto	1–9
(United Kingdom) Pacific Racing	Reynard 89D	Mugen Honda	25	(United Kingdom) Allan McNish	10
(France) DAMS	Lola T89/50	Mugen Honda	26	(France) Érik Comas	All
(France) DAMS	Lola T89/50	Mugen Honda	33	(France) Eric Bernard	All
(United Kingdom) Middlebridge Racing	Reynard 89D	Ford Cosworth	27	(United Kingdom) Mark Blundell	All
(United Kingdom) Middlebridge Racing	Reynard 89D	Ford Cosworth	28	(United Kingdom) Phil Andrews	All
(France) CDM	Reynard 89D	Ford Cosworth	29	(France) Paul Belmondo	All
(France) CDM	Reynard 89D	Ford Cosworth	30	(France) Éric Chéli	All
(United Kingdom) Roni Motorsport	Reynard 89D	Ford Cosworth	31	(Switzerland) Andrea Chiesa	All
(United Kingdom) Roni Motorsport	Reynard 89D	Ford Cosworth	32	(Italy) Emanuele Naspetti	All
(Italy) Automotive BVM	Reynard 89D	Judd	38	(Italy) Massimo Monti	1–3
(Italy) Automotive BVM	Reynard 89D	Judd	38	(Italy) Franco Scapini	4–9
(Italy) Automotive BVM	Reynard 89D	Judd	38	(Italy) Alessandro Zanardi	10
(United Kingdom) Cowman Racing	Reynard 89D	Judd	39	(Italy) Enrico Bertaggia	2–4
(United Kingdom) Cowman Racing	Reynard 89D	Judd	39	(Italy) Domenico Gitto	5–6
(United Kingdom) Cowman Racing	Reynard 89D	Judd	39	(United Kingdom) Perry McCarthy	7–9
(France) Apomatox	Reynard 89D	Ford Cosworth	40	(France) Dominique Delestre	1–3
(France) Apomatox	Reynard 89D	Ford Cosworth	41	(France) Phillipe Gache	3–10
(Italy) Forti Corse	Lola T89/50	Ford Cosworth	42	(Italy) Claudio Langes	All
(United Kingdom) Leyton House Racing	March 89B	Judd	43	(Italy) Mauro Martini	3–5
(United Kingdom) Leyton House Racing	March 89B	Ford Cosworth	43	(Australia) Gary Brabham	6–10

== Calendar ==
Round	Circuit	Date	Laps	Distance	Time	Speed	Pole position	Fastest lap	Winner
1	(United Kingdom) Silverstone Circuit	9 April	41	4.778=196.308 km	0'55:31.92	211.73 km/h	(Switzerland) Philippe Favre	(Switzerland) Philippe Favre^{1}	(Sweden) Thomas Danielsson
2	(Italy) ACI Vallelunga Circuit	30 April	64	3.2=204.80 km	1'13:08.797	167.991 km/h	(United Kingdom) Martin Donnelly	(Italy) Marco Apicella	(Italy) Fabrizio Giovanardi^{2}
3	(France) Pau Grand Prix	15 May	72	2.76=198.72 km	1'28:51.90	134.173 km/h	(Italy) Marco Apicella	(France) Éric Bernard (Italy) Marco Apicella	(France) Jean Alesi
4	(Spain) Circuito de Jerez	4 June	48	4.218=202.464 km	1'18:28.48	154.80 km/h	(France) Éric Bernard	(France) Éric Bernard	(France) Éric Bernard
5	(Italy) Autodromo di Pergusa	23 July	39	4.95=193.050 km	0'58:54.5	196.626 km/h	(France) Jean Alesi	(United Kingdom) Martin Donnelly	(Switzerland) Andrea Chiesa
6	(United Kingdom) Brands Hatch	20 August	48	4.19=201.12 km	1'02:03.76	194.15 km/h	(France) Érik Comas	(France) Éric Bernard	(United Kingdom) Martin Donnelly
7	(United Kingdom) Birmingham	28 August	51	3.975=202.725 km	1'11:48.98	169.36 km/h	(France) Jean Alesi	(France) Jean Alesi	(France) Jean Alesi
8	(Belgium) Circuit de Spa-Francorchamps	16 September	28	6.94=194.30 km	1'02:40.93	186.005 km/h	(France) Érik Comas	(France) Érik Comas	(France) Jean Alesi
9	(France) Le Mans Bugatti Circuit	24 September	46	4.267=196.0 km	1'12:31.43	168.59 km/h	(France) Éric Bernard	(France) Érik Comas	(France) Érik Comas
10	(France) Dijon-Prenois	22 October	54	3.8=205.2 km	1'05:07.20	189.066 km/h	(France) Éric Bernard	(France) Érik Comas	(France) Érik Comas

Notes

^{1} JJ Lehto set the fastest race lap, but was disqualified after the race for having an illegal rev-limiter.
^{2} Martin Donnelly won on the road, but was disqualified for using a nosecone that had not been subjected to the mandatory crash test.

== Final points standings ==
=== Driver ===
For every race points were awarded: 9 points to the winner, 6 for runner-up, 4 for third place, 3 for fourth place, 2 for fifth place and 1 for sixth place.

Jean Alesi won the championship by virtue of having three wins to Érik Comas' two. He skipped the last race of the season with the championship already won.

Pos	Driver	SIL (United Kingdom)	VLL (Italy)	PAU (France)	JER (Spain)	PER (Italy)	BRH (United Kingdom)	BIR (United Kingdom)	SPA (Belgium)	BUG (France)	DIJ (France)	Points
1	(France) Jean Alesi	4	Ret	1	5	Ret	2	1	1	6		39
2	(France) Érik Comas	5	4	DNQ	2	Ret	3	Ret	2	1	1	39
3	(France) Éric Bernard	Ret	Ret	Ret	1	Ret	4	4	Ret	3	2	25
4	(Italy) Marco Apicella	8	Ret	2	3	4	Ret	2	3	Ret	Ret	23
5	(Belgium) Eric van de Poele	6	3	Ret	4	Ret	Ret	14	4	2	5	19
6	(Switzerland) Andrea Chiesa	11	2	Ret	Ret	1	Ret	13	17	Ret	Ret	15
7	(Sweden) Thomas Danielsson	1	Ret	3	12	Ret	Ret	Ret	6	13	11	14
8	(United Kingdom) Martin Donnelly	Ret	DSQ	Ret	Ret	Ret	1	3	Ret	7	17	13
9	(United Kingdom) Eddie Irvine	DNS	Ret	Ret	Ret	3	Ret	6	9	4	4	11
10	(Italy) Fabrizio Giovanardi	DNQ	1	Ret	14	Ret	DNQ	DNS	13	DNQ	12	9
11	(United Kingdom) Mark Blundell	3	Ret	6	DNQ	Ret	Ret	5	DNS	Ret	6	8
12	(Italy) Claudio Langes	12	Ret	Ret	7	2	6	9	15	9	7	7
13	(Switzerland) Philippe Favre	2	Ret	7	Ret	Ret	7	Ret	12			6
14	(Finland) J.J. Lehto	DSQ	Ret	4	6	Ret	Ret	Ret	5	Ret		6
15	(United Kingdom) Andrew Gilbert-Scott										3	4
16	(France) Alain Ferté		6	5					Ret	Ret	13	3
17	(Canada) Stéphane Proulx	Ret	9	Ret	10	Ret	Ret	Ret	8	5	Ret	2
18	(Australia) Gary Brabham	Ret	8		13		5	DNQ	11	Ret	Ret	2
19	(Italy) Emanuele Naspetti	16	5	DNQ	Ret	Ret	9	Ret	Ret	10	10	2
20	(United Kingdom) Gary Evans	Ret	11	Ret	17	5	Ret	Ret	16	DNQ	DNQ	2
21	(United Kingdom) Phil Andrews	7	Ret	DNQ	11	Ret	10	7	Ret	12	Ret	0
22	(United Kingdom) Perry McCarthy							DNQ	7	15		0
23	(France) Didier Artzet	Ret	7	Ret								0
24	(France) Philippe Gache			Ret	8	DNQ	Ret	8	Ret	8	Ret	0
25	(United Kingdom) Ross Hockenhull	Ret					8	11				0
26	(United Kingdom) Allan McNish										8	0
27	(France) Jacques Goudchaux	10	10	DNQ	9	DNQ	DNQ	Ret	DNQ	14		0
28	(Switzerland) Jean-Denis Délétraz	14	Ret	Ret	15	Ret	Ret	12	DNQ	Ret	9	0
29	(Italy) Mauro Martini	9		DNQ	16	Ret						0
30	(France) Paul Belmondo	13	Ret	Ret	Ret	Ret	12	Ret	10	Ret	18	0
31	(Italy) Franco Scapini				DNQ	Ret	DNQ	10	DNQ	DNQ		0
32	(France) Éric Chéli	DNS	12	Ret	DNQ	Ret	DNQ	DNS	Ret	11	DNQ	0
33	(Portugal) Pedro Chaves	15	DNQ	DNQ	Ret	Ret	11	Ret	DNQ	17	DNQ	0
34	(United Kingdom) Damon Hill					Ret	Ret	DNS	14	16	15	0
35	(France) David Velay										14	0
36	(Italy) Alessandro Zanardi										16	0
37	(Japan) Ukyo Katayama	DNQ	Ret	DNQ	18							0
38	(Italy) Enrico Bertaggia	DNQ	DNQ	DNQ	19							0
	(Brazil) Marco Greco						Ret			Ret	Ret	
	(Italy) Massimo Monti	DNQ	DNQ	Ret								
	(Italy) Domenico Gitto					DNQ	Ret					
	(France) Michel Ferté					Ret						
	(Netherlands) Cor Euser								Ret			
	(Sweden) Rickard Rydell										Ret	
	(France) Dominique Delestre	DNQ	DNQ	DNQ								

== Complete overview ==
first column of every race	10	= grid position

second column of every race	10	= race result

R = retired, NS = did not start, NQ = did not qualify, DIS = disqualified (placing before disqualification displayed alongside in parentheses)

Place	Name	Team	Chassis	Engine	SIL (United Kingdom)		VLL (Italy)		PAU (France)		JER (Spain)		PER (Italy)		BRH (United Kingdom)		BIR (United Kingdom)		SPA (Belgium)		BUG (France)		DIJ (France)
1	(France) Jean Alesi	Jordan Racing	Reynard	Mugen Honda	7	4	18	R	3	1	6	5	1	R	3	2	1	1	2	1	3	6	-	-
2	(France) Érik Comas	DAMS	Lola	Mugen Honda	11	5	6	4	30	NQ	2	2	19	R	1	3	7	R	1	2	2	1	2	1
3	(France) Éric Bernard	DAMS	Lola	Mugen Honda	2	R	11	R	2	R	1	1	6	R	2	4	5	4	3	R	1	3	1	2
4	(Italy) Marco Apicella	First Racing	March	Judd	13	8
4	(Italy) Marco Apicella	First Racing	Reynard	Judd			2	R	1	2	5	3	5	4	12	R	2	2	8	3	8	R	9	R
5	(Belgium) Eric van de Poele	Players/GA Motorsports/Colt Racing	Lola	Ford Cosworth	14	6	15	3	12	R	8	4	24	R	23	R	8	14	5	4	7	2	10	5
6	(Switzerland) Andrea Chiesa	Roni Motorsport	Reynard	Ford Cosworth	16	11	9	2	18	R	11	R	4	1	11	R	4	13	18	17	14	R	6	R
7	(Sweden) Thomas Danielsson	Madgwick International	Reynard	Ford Cosworth	3	1	4	R	7	3	17	12	23	R	10	R	15	R	19	6	11	13	16	11
8	(United Kingdom) Martin Donnelly	Jordan Racing	Reynard	Mugen Honda	4	R	1	DIS(1)	4	R	4	R	2	R	4	1	3	3	20	R	4	7	3	17
9	(United Kingdom) Eddie Irvine	Pacific Racing	Reynard	Mugen Honda	5	NS	24	R	19	R	3	R	3	3	5	R	9	6	12	9	5	4	7	4
10	(Italy) Fabrizio Giovanardi	First Racing	March	Judd	28	NQ	7	1
10	(Italy) Fabrizio Giovanardi	First Racing	Reynard	Judd					6	R	21	14	12	R	29	NQ	21	NS	26	13	28	NQ	20	12
11	(United Kingdom) Mark Blundell	Middlebridge	Reynard	Ford Cosworth	6	3	3	R	8	6	29	NQ	14	R	6	R	17	5	9	NS	12	R	5	6
12	(Italy) Claudio Langes	Forti Corse	Lola	Ford Cosworth	22	12	17	R	13	R	10	7	7	2	20	6	12	9	25	15	16	9	14	7
13	(Switzerland) Philippe Favre	GA Motorsports	Lola	Ford Cosworth	1	2	14	R	5	7	9	R	9	R	7	7	16	R	24	12	-	-	-	-
	(Finland) JJ Lehto	Pacific Racing	Reynard	Mugen Honda	8	DIS(3)	5	R	10	4	16	6	8	R	8	R	23	R	4	5	10	R	-	-
15	(United Kingdom) Andrew Gilbert-Scott	GA Motorsports	Lola	Ford Cosworth	-	-	-	-	-	-	-	-	-	-	-	-	-	-	-	-	-	-	4	3
16	(France) Alain Ferté	CoBRa Motorsports	Reynard	Ford Cosworth	-	-	10	6	21	5	-	-	-	-	-	-	-	-	6	R	9	R	26	13
17	(Italy) Emanuele Naspetti	Roni Motorsport	Reynard	Ford Cosworth	25	16	8	5	23	NQ	7	R	25	R	14	9	6	R	10	R	13	10	8	10
	(United Kingdom) Gary Evans	Madgwick International	Reynard	Ford Cosworth	10	R	25	11	20	R	24	17	10	5	21	R	18	R	13	16	27	NQ	29	NQ
	(Australia) Gary Brabham	Bromley Motorsport	Reynard	Ford Cosworth	19	R	22	8	-	-	19	13	-	-
	(Australia) Gary Brabham	Leyton House Racing	March	Judd											18	5	28	NQ	23	11	25	R	25	R
	(Canada) Stéphane Proulx	Players/GA Motorsports/Colt Racing	Lola	Ford Cosworth	9	R	16	9	11	R	12	10	15	R	13	R	20	R	7	8	6	5	11	R
-	(United Kingdom) Phil Andrews	Middlebridge	Reynard	Ford Cosworth	15	7	20	R	25	NQ	14	11	17	R	9	10	11	7	16	R	17	12	19	R
-	(United Kingdom) Perry McCarthy	Cowman Racing	Lola	Ford Cosworth	-	-	-	-	-	-	-	-	-	-	-	-	29	NQ	11	7	26	15	-	-
-	(France) Didier Artzet	Racetech 3000	Reynard	Ford Cosworth	23	R	12	7	17	R	-	-	-	-	-	-	-	-	-	-	-	-	-	-
-	(France) Philippe Gache	Apomatox	Reynard	Ford Cosworth	-	-	-	-	14	R	15	8	29	NQ	16	R	10	8	15	R	18	8	17	R
-	(United Kingdom) Ross Hockenhull	CoBRa Motorsports	Reynard	Ford Cosworth	21	R	-	-	-	-	-	-	-	-	17	8	24	11	-	-	-	-	-	-
-	(United Kingdom) Allan McNish	Pacific Racing	Reynard	Ford Cosworth	-	-	-	-	-	-	-	-	-	-	-	-	-	-	-	-	-	-	13	8
-	(France) Jacques Goudchaux	GA Motorsports	Lola	Ford Cosworth	20	10	21	10	26	NQ	13	9	27	NQ	28	NQ	19	R	29	NQ	22	14	-	-
-	(Switzerland) Jean-Denis Délétraz	First Racing	March	Judd	26	14	19	R	16	R	25	15
-	(Switzerland) Jean-Denis Délétraz	First Racing	Reynard	Judd									18	R	15	R	13	12	27	NQ	15	R	12	9
-	(Italy) Mauro Martini	Lola Motorsport	March	Judd	12	9	-	-
-	(Italy) Mauro Martini	Leyton House Racing	March	Judd					28	NQ	23	16	16	R	-	-	-	-	-	-	-	-	-	-
-	(France) Paul Belmondo	CDM	Reynard	Ford Cosworth	18	13	13	R	22	R	20	R	22	R	19	12	14	R	14	10	19	R	24	18
-	(Italy) Franco Scapini	Automotive BVM	Reynard	Judd	-	-	-	-	-	-	27	NQ	21	R	30	NQ	26	10	30	NQ	29	NQ	-	-
-	(France) Éric Chéli	CDM	Reynard	Ford Cosworth	17	NS	26	12	9	R	28	NQ	11	R	27	NQ	22	NS	22	R	21	11	27	NQ
-	(Portugal) Pedro Chaves	CoBRa Motorsports	Reynard	Ford Cosworth	24	15	28	NQ	29	NQ	22	R	26	R	22	11	25	R	28	NQ	23	17	28	NQ
-	(United Kingdom) Damon Hill	Footwork	Mooncraft	Mugen Honda	-	-	-	-	-	-	-	-	20	R	24	R	27	NS	17	14	24	16	21	15
-	(France) David Velay	Bromley Motorsport	Reynard	Ford Cosworth	-	-	-	-	-	-	-	-	-	-	-	-	-	-	-	-	-	-	22	14
-	(Italy) Alessandro Zanardi	Automotive BVM	Reynard	Judd	-	-	-	-	-	-	-	-	-	-	-	-	-	-	-	-	-	-	23	16
-	(Japan) Ukyo Katayama	Footwork	Mooncraft	Mugen Honda	29	NQ	23	R	24	NQ	26	18	-	-	-	-	-	-	-	-	-	-	-	-
-	(Italy) Enrico Bertaggia	Lola Motorsport	March	Judd	30	NQ
-	(Italy) Enrico Bertaggia	Cowman Racing	Lola	Ford Cosworth			30	NQ	31	NQ	18	19	-	-	-	-	-	-	-	-	-	-	-	-
-	(Brazil) Marco Greco	Bromley Motorsport	Reynard	Ford Cosworth	-	-	-	-	-	-	-	-	-	-	25	R	-	-	-	-
-	(Brazil) Marco Greco	GA Motorsports	Lola	Ford Cosworth																	20	R	18	R
-	(Italy) Massimo Monti	Automotive BVM	Reynard	Judd	27	NQ	27	NQ	15	R	-	-	-	-	-	-	-	-	-	-	-	-	-	-
-	(Italy) Domenico Gitto	Cowman Racing	Lola	Ford Cosworth	-	-	-	-	-	-	-	-	28	NQ	26	R	-	-	-	-	-	-	-	-
-	(France) Michel Ferté	CoBRa Motorsports	Reynard	Ford Cosworth	-	-	-	-	-	-	-	-	13	R	-	-	-	-	-	-	-	-	-	-
-	(Netherlands) Cor Euser	Bromley Motorsport	Reynard	Ford Cosworth	-	-	-	-	-	-	-	-	-	-	-	-	-	-	21	R	-	-	-	-
-	(Sweden) Rickard Rydell	Jordan Racing	Reynard	Mugen Honda	-	-	-	-	-	-	-	-	-	-	-	-	-	-	-	-	-	-	15	R
-	(France) Dominique Delestre	Apomatox	Reynard	Ford Cosworth	31	NQ	29	NQ	27	NQ	-	-	-	-	-	-	-	-	-	-	-	-	-	-
