= Eddie Jordan Racing =

British motorsport team

(United Kingdom) Eddie Jordan Racing
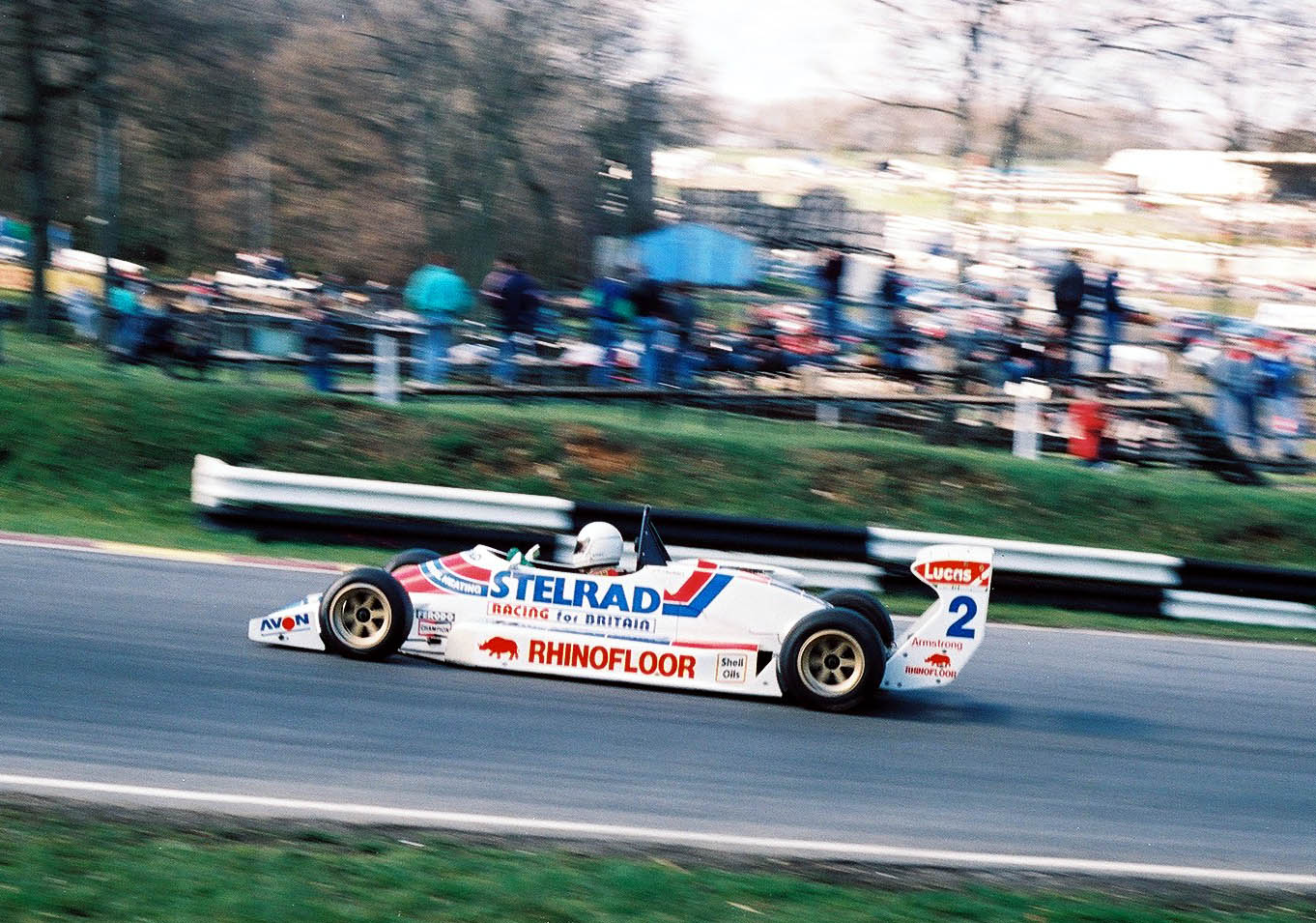
- Founded: 1980
- Founder(s): Eddie Jordan
- Folded: 1991
- Team principal(s): Eddie Jordan
- Former series: Formula 3000; British Formula 3 European Formula 3 Cup; German Formula 3
- Drivers' Championships: 1987 British Formula 3 (Johnny Herbert); 1989 F3000 (Jean Alesi)

Eddie Jordan Racing was a British racing team founded by Irish racing driver Eddie Jordan in 1980.

The team competed in Formula 3 and Formula 3000, winning the 1989 International Formula 3000 Drivers' Championship with Jean Alesi. After success in Formula 3000 the team moved up to Formula One, changing their name to Jordan Grand Prix and competing in F1 from 1991 until 2005.

== Complete Formula 3000 results ==
(key) (Races in bold indicate pole position; races in italics indicate fastest lap)

Year	Chassis	Engine	Tyres	Drivers	1	2	3	4	5	6	7	8	9	10	11
1985	March 85B	Cosworth	A		SIL	THR	EST	VAL	PAU	SPA	DIJ	PER	ZEL	ZAN	DON
1985	March 85B	Cosworth	A	(Belgium) Thierry Tassin			Ret			Ret	Ret		6	8	Ret
1986	March 86B	Cosworth	A		SIL	VAL	PAU	SPA	IMO	MUG	PER	ZEL	BIR	BUG	JAR
1986	March 86B	Cosworth	A	(United Kingdom) Russell Spence	18^{†}	DNQ	Ret	15	Ret	DNQ	Ret				
1986	March 86B	Cosworth	A	(United Kingdom) Kenny Acheson								Ret			
1986	March 86B	Cosworth	A	(Republic of Ireland) Tommy Byrne									15		
1986	March 86B	Cosworth	A	(Netherlands) Jan Lammers										11	
1986	March 86B	Cosworth	A	(Switzerland) Bernard Santal											DNQ
1986	March 86B	Cosworth	A	(Belgium) Thierry Tassin	22^{†}										
1986	March 86B	Cosworth	A	(Austria) Pierre Chauvet		Ret	DNQ	Ret	Ret	18		DNQ		14	Ret
1986	March 86B	Cosworth	A	(Italy) Alessandro Santin							8				
1986	March 86B	Cosworth	A	(United States) Ross Cheever									DNQ		
1987	March 87B	Cosworth	A		SIL	VAL	SPA	PAU	DON	PER	BRH	BIR	IMO	BUG	JAR
1987	March 87B	Cosworth	A	(Sweden) Tomas Kaiser	13	9	DNQ	Ret	Ret	DNQ					
1988	Reynard 88D	Cosworth	A		JER	VAL	PAU	SIL	MON	PER	BRH	BIR	BUG	ZOL	DIJ
1988	Reynard 88D	Cosworth	A	(United Kingdom) Johnny Herbert	**1**	Ret		7	3	Ret	**Ret**				
1988	Reynard 88D	Cosworth	A	(Italy) Paolo Barilla									Ret	Ret	7
1988	Reynard 88D	Cosworth	A	(Sweden) Thomas Danielsson	Ret	Ret	DNS	8	Ret						
1988	Reynard 88D	Cosworth	A	(Italy) Alessandro Santin						11					
1988	Reynard 88D	Cosworth	A	(United Kingdom) Martin Donnelly							1	2	2	**Ret**	1
1989	Reynard 89D	Mugen Honda	A		SIL	VAL	PAU	JER	PER	BRH	BIR	SPA	BUG	DIJ	
1989	Reynard 89D	Mugen Honda	A	(United Kingdom) Martin Donnelly	Ret	**DSQ**	Ret	Ret	Ret	1	3	Ret	7	17	
1989	Reynard 89D	Mugen Honda	A	(France) Jean Alesi	4	Ret	1	5	**Ret**	2	**1**	1	6		
1989	Reynard 89D	Mugen Honda	A	(Sweden) Rickard Rydell										Ret	
1990	Reynard 90D	Mugen Honda	A		DON	SIL	PAU	JER	MNZ	PER	HOC	BRH	BIR	BUG	NOG
1990	Reynard 90D	Mugen Honda	A	(Italy) Emanuele Naspetti	Ret	10	Ret		Ret	Ret	Ret	Ret	6	DNQ	
1990	Reynard 90D	Mugen Honda	A	(Italy) Vincenzo Sospiri				8							DNQ
1990	Reynard 90D	Mugen Honda	A	(United Kingdom) Eddie Irvine	Ret	6	Ret	DNS	2	4	1	**3**	Ret	3	Ret
1990	Reynard 90D	Mugen Honda	A	(Germany) Heinz-Harald Frentzen	Ret	Ret	Ret	17	Ret	5	6	7	Ret	Ret	DNQ
1991	Lola T91/50	Cosworth	A		VAL	PAU	JER	MUG	PER	HOC	BRH	SPA	BUG	NOG	
1991	Lola T91/50	Cosworth	A	(United Kingdom) Damon Hill	4	Ret	8	Ret	11	Ret	6	Ret	4	3	
1991	Lola T91/50	Cosworth	A	(Italy) Vincenzo Sospiri	Ret	DNQ	15	4	Ret	2	16	10	Ret	13	
