= 1987 International Formula 3000 Championship =

Motor racing competition

1987 FIA International Formula 3000 Championship

Seasons
- ← 1986 1988 →

The 1987 International Formula 3000 season was the third season of FIA Formula 3000 motor racing. It featured the 1987 Formula 3000 Intercontinental Championship, which was contested over an eleven round series in which 23 different teams, 53 different drivers, 4 different chassis constructors and 3 different engines manufacturers competed. The championship was won by Stefano Modena who drove a March 87B Ford Cosworth for Onyx Racing ahead of Lola Motorsport driver Luis Perez Sala.

== Drivers and teams ==
Team	Chassis	Engine	No.	Drivers	Rounds
(Italy) Genoa Racing	March 87B	Cosworth	1	(Italy) Alessandro Santin	1
(Italy) Genoa Racing	March 87B	Cosworth	1	(Canada) Jacques-Joseph Villeneuve	3
(Italy) Genoa Racing	March 87B	Cosworth	1	(Italy) Corrado Fabi	5-6
(Italy) Genoa Racing	March 87B	Cosworth	1	(France) Michel Ferté	7-9
(Italy) Genoa Racing	March 87B	Cosworth	1	(Chile) Eliseo Salazar	10-11
(Italy) Genoa Racing	March 87B	Cosworth	2	(Switzerland) Gregor Foitek	1-8
(Italy) Genoa Racing	March 87B	Cosworth	2	(Italy) Fabrizio Barbazza	9
(Italy) Genoa Racing	March 87B	Cosworth	2	(Italy) Marco Romano	10
(Italy) Genoa Racing	March 87B	Cosworth	2	(Denmark) Kris Nissen	11
(Italy) Pavesi Racing	Ralt RT21	Cosworth	3	(Italy) Pierluigi Martini	1-4, 6-10
(Italy) Pavesi Racing	Ralt RT20	Cosworth	3	(Italy) Pierluigi Martini	5, 11
(Italy) Pavesi Racing	Ralt RT21	Cosworth	4	(Italy) Paolo Barilla	1-4, 6-10
(Italy) Pavesi Racing	Ralt RT20	Cosworth	4	(Italy) Paolo Barilla	5, 11
(France) Oreca Motorsport	March 87B	Cosworth	5	(France) Olivier Grouillard	1, 4-11
(France) Oreca Motorsport	March 86B	Cosworth	5	(France) Olivier Grouillard	2-3
(France) Oreca Motorsport	March 87B	Cosworth	6	(France) Yannick Dalmas	1-2, 4-11
(United Kingdom) Ralt Racing Ltd.	Ralt RT21	Honda	7	(Brazil) Roberto Moreno	All
(United Kingdom) Ralt Racing Ltd.	Ralt RT21	Honda	8	(Brazil) Maurício Gugelmin	All
(United Kingdom) Onyx Racing	March 87B	Cosworth	9	(Italy) Stefano Modena	All
(United Kingdom) Onyx Racing	March 87B	Cosworth	10	(France) Pierre-Henri Raphanel	All
(United Kingdom) Lola Motorsport	Lola T87/50	Cosworth	11	(Canada) John Jones	All
(United Kingdom) Lola Motorsport	Lola T87/50	Cosworth	12	(Spain) Luis Perez Sala	All
(United Kingdom) BS Automotive	Lola T87/50	Cosworth	14	(France) Dominique Delestre	1-4, 7-8
(United Kingdom) BS Automotive	Lola T87/50	Cosworth	14	(United Kingdom) Mark Blundell	9-11
(United Kingdom) BS Automotive	Lola T87/50	Cosworth	15	(Spain) Alfonso de Vinuesa	1-3, 7-8
(United Kingdom) BS Automotive	Lola T87/50	Cosworth	15	(Italy) Giovanna Amati	5-6, 10
(United Kingdom) BS Automotive	Lola T86/50	Cosworth	40	(France) Michel Ferté	1
(United Kingdom) BS Automotive	Lola T87/50	Cosworth	40	(France) Michel Ferté	2-5
(United Kingdom) BS Automotive	Lola T87/50	Cosworth	40	(United Kingdom) Mark Blundell	6
(United Kingdom) BS Automotive	Lola T86/50	Cosworth	40	(Sweden) Tomas Kaiser	7-9
(United Kingdom) BS Automotive	Lola T87/50	Cosworth	40	(Sweden) Tomas Kaiser	10-11
(France) Équipe Dollop	March 86B	Cosworth	16	(Switzerland) Urs Durdler	1
(France) Équipe Dollop	March 86B	Cosworth	16	(Italy) Guido Daccò	2-5
(France) Équipe Dollop	March 86B	Cosworth	17	(Switzerland) Jean-Pierre Frey	1-9
(France) Équipe Dollop	March 86B	Cosworth	41	(Switzerland) Benoît Morand	4-5
(United Kingdom) Bromley Motorsport	Ralt RT21	Cosworth	18	(Chile) Eliseo Salazar	1-6
(United Kingdom) Bromley Motorsport	Ralt RT21	Cosworth	18	(Netherlands) Cor Euser	7-11
(Republic of Ireland) Eddie Jordan Racing	March 87B	Cosworth	20	(Sweden) Tomas Kaiser	1-6
(United Kingdom) Colin Bennett Racing	March 86B	Cosworth	21	(Netherlands) Cor Euser	1-3
(United Kingdom) Colin Bennett Racing	March 86B	Cosworth	21	(United Kingdom) Robert Lee-Lewis	6-8
(United Kingdom) Colin Bennett Racing	March 86B	Cosworth	21	(United Kingdom) John Alcorn	10-11
(United Kingdom) Colin Bennett Racing	March 87B	Cosworth	42	(United Kingdom) Robert Lee-Lewis	5
(United Kingdom) Colin Bennett Racing	March 87B	Cosworth	44	(Chile) Eliseo Salazar	7-9
(United Kingdom) Roni Motorsport	March 87B	Cosworth	22	(Sweden) Steven Andskär	All
(United Kingdom) GEM Motorsport	Ralt RT21	Cosworth	23	(United Kingdom) Gary Evans	All
(Italy) EuroVenturini	Dallara 3087	Cosworth	25	(Italy) Marco Apicella	All
(Italy) EuroVenturini	Dallara 3087	Cosworth	26	(Finland) Jari Nurminen	1-4
(Italy) EuroVenturini	Dallara 3087	Cosworth	26	(Italy) Guido Daccò	6-7
(Italy) EuroVenturini	Dallara 3087	Cosworth	26	(Italy) Nicola Tesini	9
(United Kingdom) Madgwick International	March 87B	Cosworth	28	(United Kingdom) Andy Wallace	1-6
(United Kingdom) Madgwick International	Lola T87/50	Cosworth	28	(United Kingdom) Andy Wallace	7-11
(United Kingdom) GA Motorsport	Lola T87/50	Cosworth	29	(Belgium) Thierry Tassin	3
(United Kingdom) GA Motorsport	Lola T87/50	Cosworth	29	(United Kingdom) Julian Bailey	5-11
(United Kingdom) GA Motorsport	Lola T87/50	Cosworth	30	(Finland) Jari Nurminen	5-10
(United Kingdom) GA Motorsport	Lola T87/50	Cosworth	30	(Spain) Antonio Albacete	11
(United Kingdom) GA Motorsport	Lola T86/50	Cosworth	43	(Germany) Altfrid Heger	7-8
(United Kingdom) GA Motorsport	Lola T86/50	Cosworth	43	(Switzerland) Gregor Foitek	9-11
(Italy) FIRST Racing	March 87B	Cosworth	31	(Italy) Lamberto Leoni	1-9
(Italy) FIRST Racing	March 87B	Judd	31	(Italy) Lamberto Leoni	10-11
(Italy) FIRST Racing	March 87B	Cosworth	32	(Italy) Gabriele Tarquini	All
(Italy) FIRST Racing	March 87B	Cosworth	33	(Italy) Aldo Bertuzzi	1, 4, 9
(Italy) FIRST Racing	March 87B	Cosworth	33	(Italy) Beppe Gabbiani	2-3
(Italy) FIRST Racing	March 87B	Cosworth	33	(Italy) Claudio Langes	5-8, 11
(Italy) FIRST Racing	March 87B	Cosworth	33	(France) Alain Ferté	10
(United Kingdom) Fleetray Racing	Lola T86/50	Cosworth	34	(United Kingdom) Mark Blundell	1-3, 5, 7-8
(France) GDBA Motorsport	Lola T87/50	Cosworth	35	(France) Michel Trollé	All
(France) GDBA Motorsport	Lola T87/50	Cosworth	36	(France) Paul Belmondo	All
(United Kingdom) Racetech 3000	March 87B	Cosworth	37	(United Kingdom) Robert Lee-Lewis	1-3
(United Kingdom) Racetech 3000	March 87B	Cosworth	37	(Switzerland) Mario Hytten	4-7
(United Kingdom) Racetech 3000	Ralt RT20	Cosworth	37	(Switzerland) Mario Hytten	8-9
(United Kingdom) Racetech 3000	March 87B	Cosworth	37	(Canada) Gilles Lempereur	10-11
(United Kingdom) Murray Taylor Racing	March 87B	Cosworth	38	(United Kingdom) Russell Spence	1-6
(United Kingdom) Mountleigh Motorsport	March 87B	Cosworth	38	(United Kingdom) Russell Spence	7-11
(Germany) Bertram Schäfer Racing	Ralt RT21	Cosworth	39	(Germany) Altfrid Heger	3
(Italy) Forti Corse	Dallara 3087	Cosworth	42	(Italy) Nicola Larini	6-7, 9, 11
(Italy) Forti Corse	Dallara 3087	Cosworth	42	(Italy) Nicola Tesini	8

== Calendar ==
Round	Circuit	Date	Laps	Distance	Time	Speed	Pole position	Fastest lap	Winner
1	(United Kingdom) Silverstone Circuit	12 April	42	4.778=200.676 km	0'57:07.1	210.750 km/h	(Brazil) Roberto Moreno	(Brazil) Roberto Moreno	(Brazil) Maurício Gugelmin
2	(Italy) ACI Vallelunga Circuit	10 May	61	3.2=195.2 km	1'10:06.2	167.067 km/h	(France) Yannick Dalmas	(Italy) Stefano Modena	(Italy) Stefano Modena
3	(Belgium) Circuit de Spa-Francorchamps	16 May	16	6.949=111.184 km	0'38:57.67	171.001 km/h	(Brazil) Roberto Moreno	(Spain) Luis Pérez-Sala	(France) Michel Trollé
4	(France) Pau Grand Prix	8 June	72	2.76=198.72 km	1'30:14.5	132.12 km/h	(France) Pierre-Henri Raphanel	(Brazil) Roberto Moreno	(France) Yannick Dalmas
5	(United Kingdom) Donington Park	28 June	50	4.023=201.15 km	1'12:16.41	166.990 km/h	(Spain) Luis Pérez-Sala	(France) Yannick Dalmas	(Spain) Luis Pérez-Sala
6	(Italy) Autodromo di Pergusa	19 July	41	4.95=202.95 km	1'03:09.90	192.781 km/h	(Brazil) Maurício Gugelmin	(Italy) Lamberto Leoni	(Brazil) Roberto Moreno
7	(United Kingdom) Brands Hatch	3 August	45	4.206=189.27 km	0'59:09.0	191.99 km/h	(Brazil) Roberto Moreno	(France) Yannick Dalmas	(United Kingdom) Julian Bailey
8	(United Kingdom) Birmingham	31 August	51	3.975=202.725 km	1'11:44.52	169.540 km/h	(Brazil) Maurício Gugelmin	(Brazil) Roberto Moreno	(Italy) Stefano Modena
9	(Italy) Autodromo Enzo e Dino Ferrari	13 September	40	5.04=201.6 km	1.06:13.38	182.656 km/h	(Brazil) Roberto Moreno	(Italy) Gabriele Tarquini	(Italy) Stefano Modena
10	(France) Bugatti Circuit	27 September	47	4.24=199.28 km	1'12:49.12	164.200 km/h	(Spain) Luis Pérez-Sala	(Spain) Luis Pérez-Sala	(Spain) Luis Pérez-Sala
11	(Spain) Circuito del Jarama	11 October	61	3.312=202.032 km	1'23:21.289	145.426 km/h	(Canada) John Jones	(France) Yannick Dalmas	(France) Yannick Dalmas

Note:

Race 3 stopped early due to an accident involving Alfonso de Vinuesa and Luis Pérez-Sala. Only half-points were awarded.

== Championship standings ==
At each race points were awarded as follows: 9 for first place, 6 for second place, 4 for third place, 3 for fourth place, 2 for fifth place and 1 for sixth place. The best seven results could be retained. Discarded points and gross totals are displayed within tooltips.

Pos.	Driver	SIL (United Kingdom)	VLL (Italy)	SPA^{‡} (Belgium)	PAU (France)	DON (United Kingdom)	PER (Italy)	BRH (United Kingdom)	BIR (United Kingdom)	IMO (Italy)	BUG (France)	JAR (Spain)	Points
1	(Italy) Stefano Modena	4	1	Ret	Ret	2	6	4	1	1	Ret	6	40
2	(Spain) Luis Pérez-Sala	Ret	2	18	Ret	1	Ret	9	4	3	1	5	33
3	(Brazil) Roberto Moreno	3	11	3	10†	4	1	3	2	5	9	Ret	30
4	(Brazil) Maurício Gugelmin	1	3	Ret	Ret	Ret	Ret	2	3	7	10	2	29
5	(France) Yannick Dalmas	Ret	Ret		1	17	Ret	5	Ret	Ret	Ret	1	20
6	(France) Michel Trollé	2	Ret	1	Ret	5	Ret	14	Ret	11	3	Ret	16.5
7	(United Kingdom) Julian Bailey					Ret	4	1	Ret	NC	6	Ret	13
8	(Italy) Gabriele Tarquini	10	Ret	12	11†	19	3	17	14	2	5	Ret	12
9	(Italy) Lamberto Leoni	8	8	13	6	Ret	5	11	Ret	4	4	4	12
10	(United Kingdom) Russell Spence	Ret	Ret	9	Ret	DNQ	Ret	7	8	DNQ	2	3	10
11	(Canada) John Jones	Ret	5	7	2	13	8	8	7	9	11	10	8
12	(Italy) Pierluigi Martini	5	Ret	Ret	7	8	2	20	Ret	Ret	7	9	8
13	(France) Pierre-Henri Raphanel	16	4	8	Ret	3	Ret	Ret	Ret	Ret	14	Ret	7
14	(United Kingdom) Mark Blundell	Ret	6	2		9	9	6	DNQ	Ret	Ret	8	5
15	(France) Michel Ferté	Ret	10	14	3	6		DNQ	11	DNQ			5
16	(United Kingdom) Andy Wallace	Ret	7	4	DNQ	Ret	14	13	5	6	Ret	Ret	4.5
17	(France) Olivier Grouillard	7	Ret	DNQ	4	12†	Ret	15	6	Ret	Ret	Ret	4
18	(France) Paul Belmondo	18	16	11	5	15	Ret	12	12	DNQ	Ret	11	2
19	(Italy) Marco Apicella	15	Ret	5	Ret	7	Ret	DNQ	13	13†	15	7	1
20	(Spain) Alfonso de Vinuesa	6	Ret	16				DNQ	DNQ				1
21	(United Kingdom) Gary Evans	DNQ	DNQ	6	DNQ	20	10	10	Ret	Ret	12	Ret	0.5
22	(Italy) Paolo Barilla	11	17	Ret	8	10	7	Ret	Ret	8	17	DNQ	0
23	(Switzerland) Gregor Foitek	Ret	15	10	Ret	DNQ	DNQ	DNQ	Ret	12	8	14	0
24	(Sweden) Steven Andskär	14	DNQ	20	DNQ	11	DNQ	19	9	Ret	13	13	0
25	(Sweden) Tomas Kaiser	13	9	DNQ	Ret	Ret	DNQ	22	DNQ	Ret	16	12	0
26	(Switzerland) Mario Hytten				9	DNQ	13	DNQ	Ret	DNQ			0
27	(Chile) Eliseo Salazar	9	DNQ	17	Ret	18	Ret	18	DNQ	14	Ret	DNQ	0
28	(Netherlands) Cor Euser	17	14	Ret				Ret	Ret	10	Ret	Ret	0
29	(Italy) Claudio Langes					DNQ	Ret	Ret	10			Ret	0
30	(Finland) Jari Nurminen	DNQ	13	DNQ	DNQ	14	11	DNQ	Ret	Ret	DNQ		0
31	(France) Dominique Delestre	12	Ret	19	Ret			DNQ	DNQ				0
32	(Italy) Beppe Gabbiani		12	Ret									0
33	(Italy) Guido Daccò		DNQ	DNQ	DNQ	DNQ	12	DNQ					0
34	(Italy) Aldo Bertuzzi	DNQ			DNQ					15			0
35	(Belgium) Thierry Tassin			15									0
36	(Italy) Nicola Larini						Ret	16		Ret		Ret	0
37	(Italy) Giovanna Amati					16	DNQ			DNQ			0
38	(Germany) Altfrid Heger			DNQ				21	DNQ				0
	(Italy) Corrado Fabi					Ret	DNQ				DNQ		
	(France) Gilles Lempereur										DNQ	Ret	
	(France) Alain Ferté										Ret		
	(Switzerland) Jean-Pierre Frey	DNQ	DNQ	DNQ		DNQ	DNQ	DNQ	DNQ	DNQ			
	(United Kingdom) Robert Lee-Lewis	DNQ	DNQ	DNQ		DNQ	DNQ	DNQ	DNQ				
	(Switzerland) Benoît Morand					DNQ	DNQ						
	(Italy) Nicola Tesini								DNQ	DNQ			
	(United Kingdom) John Alcorn										DNQ	DNQ	
	(Switzerland) Urs Dudler	DNQ											
	(Italy) Alessandro Santin	DNQ											
	(Canada) Jacques-Joseph Villeneuve			DNQ									
	(Italy) Fabrizio Barbazza									DNQ			
	(Switzerland) Marzio Romano										DNQ		
	(Spain) Antonio Albacete											DNQ	
	(Denmark) Kris Nissen											DNQ	

== Complete overview ==
first column of every race	10	= grid position

second column of every race	10	= race result

R10=retired, but classified NC=not classified R=retired NQ=did not qualify 8P=grid position, but started from pit lane

Place	Name	Team	Chassis	Engine	SIL (United Kingdom)		VLL (Italy)		SPA (Belgium)		PAU (France)		DON (United Kingdom)		PER (Italy)		BRH (United Kingdom)		BIR (United Kingdom)		IMO (Italy)		BUG (France)		JAR (Spain)
1	(Italy) Stefano Modena	Onyx Racing	March	Ford Cosworth	7	4	2	1	3	R	8	R	4	2	2	6	5	4	2	1	5	1	4	R	23	6
2	(Spain) Luis Pérez-Sala	Lola Motorsport	Lola	Ford Cosworth	4	R	3	2	20	18	4	R	1	1	3	R	12	9	11	4	2	3	1	1	18	5
3	(Brazil) Roberto Moreno	Team Ralt	Ralt	Honda	1	3	14	11	1	3	3	R10	3	4	8	1	1	3	8P	2	1	5	10	9	21	R
4	(Brazil) Maurício Gugelmin	Team Ralt	Ralt	Honda	2	1	5	3	7	R	2	R	2	R	1	R	2	2	1	3	6	7	9	10	12	2
5	(France) Yannick Dalmas	Oreca Motorsport	March	Ford Cosworth	5	R	1	R	-	-	7	1	5	17	13	R	8	5	9	R	10	R	3	R	14	1
6	(France) Michel Trollé	GBDA Motorsport	Lola	Ford Cosworth	3	2	24	R	8	1	9	R	13	5	12	R	11	14	6	R	7	11	6	3	13	R
7	(United Kingdom) Julian Bailey	GA Motorsports	Lola	Ford Cosworth	-	-	-	-	-	-	-	-	8	R	16	4	3	1	16	R	15	NC	14	6	9	R
8	(Italy) Gabriele Tarquini	First Racing	March	Ford Cosworth	9	10	9	R	11	12	5	R11	15	19	7	3	18	17	7	14	8	2	19	5	4	R
	(Italy) Lamberto Leoni	First Racing	March	Ford Cosworth	18	8	8	8	25	13	18	6	6	R	10	5	17	11	18	R
	(Italy) Lamberto Leoni	First Racing	March	Judd																	9	4	12	4	17	4
10	(United Kingdom) Russell Spence	Murray Taylor Racing	March	Ford Cosworth	15	R	22	R	9	9	21	R	27	NQ	15	R	10	7	25	8	30	NQ	13	2	26	3
11	(Canada) John Jones	Lola Motorsport	Lola	Ford Cosworth	14	R	6	5	4	7	10	2	7	13	6	8	7	8	14	7	11	9	18	11	1	10
	(Italy) Pierluigi Martini	Pavesi Racing	Ralt	Ford Cosworth	8	5	12	R	10	R	6	7	16	8	4	2	15	20	10	R	3	R	16	7	5	9
13	(France) Pierre-Henri Raphanel	Onyx Racing	March	Ford Cosworth	13	16	7	4	17	8	1	R	11	3	5	R	24	R	5	R	12	R	5	14	8	R
14	(France) Michel Ferté	BS Automotive	Lola	Ford Cosworth	21	R	16	10	13	14	14	3	10	6	-	-
14	(France) Michel Ferté	Genoa Racing	March	Ford Cosworth													27	NQ	20	11	27	NQ	-	-	-	-
	(United Kingdom) Mark Blundell	Fleetray Racing	Lola	Ford Cosworth	17	R	13	6	5	2	-	-	14	9			6	6	31	NQ
	(United Kingdom) Mark Blundell	BS Automotive	Lola	Ford Cosworth											22	9					18	R	15	R	10	8
16	(United Kingdom) Andy Wallace	Madgwick International	March	Ford Cosworth	23	R	11	7	2	4	23	NQ	17	R	21	14
16	(United Kingdom) Andy Wallace	Madgwick International	Lola	Ford Cosworth													4	13	3	5	4	6	11	R	2	R
17	(France) Olivier Grouillard	Oreca Motorsport	March	Ford Cosworth	10	7	10	R	28	NQ	13	4	9	R12	18	R	9	15	4	6	17	R	2	R	25	R
18	(France) Paul Belmondo	GBDA Motorsport	Lola	Ford Cosworth	12	18	17	16	21	11	11	5	19	15	25	R	20	12	19	12	32	NQ	7	R	22	11
19	(Spain) Alfonso de Vinuesa	BS Automotive	Lola	Ford Cosworth	11	6	4	R	6	16	-	-	-	-	-	-	29	NQ	30	NQ	-	-	-	-	-	-
	(Italy) Marco Apicella	EuroVenturini	Dallara	Ford Cosworth	24	15	18	R	14	5	22	R	21	7	24	R	30	NQ	22	13	13	R13	24	15	19	7
21	(United Kingdom) Gary Evans	GEM Motorsport	Ralt	Ford Cosworth	28	NQ	28	NQ	18	6	24	NQ	20	20	14	10	13	10	12	R	23	R	20	12	11	R
-	(Italy) Paolo Barilla	Pavesi Racing	Ralt	Ford Cosworth	16	11	19	17	23	R	15	8	12	10	11	7	16	R	13	R	14	8	25	17	28	NQ
-	(Switzerland) Gregor Foitek	Genoa Racing	March	Ford Cosworth	25	R	25	15	24	10	20	R	28	NQ	30	NQ	32	NQ	21	R
-	(Switzerland) Gregor Foitek	GA Motorsports	Lola	Ford Cosworth																	19	12	8	8	3	14
-	(Sweden) Steven Andskär	Roni Motorsport	March	Ford Cosworth	22	14	30	NQ	15	20	27	NQ	24	11	29	NQ	22	19	15	9	22	R	17	13	20	13
-	(Sweden) Tomas Kaiser	Jordan Racing	March	Ford Cosworth	26	13	21	9	29	NQ	16	R	18	R	28	NQ
-	(Sweden) Tomas Kaiser	BS Automotive	Lola	Ford Cosworth													19	22	28	NQ	26	R	23	16	16	12
-	(Switzerland) Mario Hytten	Racetech 3000	March	Ford Cosworth	-	-	-	-	-	-	17	9	30	NQ	26	13	28	NQ
-	(Switzerland) Mario Hytten	Racetech 3000	Ralt	Ford Cosworth															26	R	29	NQ	-	-	-	-
-	(Chile) Eliseo Salazar	Bromley Motorsport	Ralt	Ford Cosworth	19	9	27	NQ	26	17	19	R	23	18	17	R
-	(Chile) Eliseo Salazar	CoBRa Motorsports	March	Ford Cosworth													26	18	27	NQ	21	14	26	R	27	NQ
-	(Netherlands) Cor Euser	CoBRa Motorsports	March	Ford Cosworth	6	17	26	14	22	R	-	-	-	-	-	-
-	(Netherlands) Cor Euser	Bromley Motorsport	Ralt	Ford Cosworth													14	R	17	R	16	10	21	R	6	R
-	(Italy) Claudio Langes	First Racing	March	Ford Cosworth	-	-	-	-	-	-	-	-	29	NQ	20	R	21	R	24	10	-	-	-	-	15	R
-	(Finland) Jari Nurminen	EuroVenturini	Dallara	Ford Cosworth	27	NQ	23	13	30	NQ	25	NQ
-	(Finland) Jari Nurminen	GA Motorsports	Lola	Ford Cosworth									22	14	19	11	31	NQ	23	R	24	R	27	NQ	-	-
-	(France) Dominique Delestre	BS Automotive	Lola	Ford Cosworth	20	12	15	R	16	19	12	R	-	-	-	-	33	NQ	32	NQ	-	-	-	-	-	-
-	(Italy) Beppe Gabbiani	First Racing	March	Ford Cosworth	-	-	20	12	19	R	-	-	-	-	-	-	-	-	-	-	-	-	-	-	-	-
-	(Italy) Guido Daccò	Équipe Dollop	March	Ford Cosworth	-	-	29	NQ	32	NQ	28	NQ	31	NQ
-	(Italy) Guido Daccò	EuroVenturini	Dallara	Ford Cosworth											23	12	35	NQ	-	-	-	-	-	-	-	-
-	(Italy) Aldo Bertuzzi	First Racing	March	Ford Cosworth	30	NQ	-	-	-	-	26	NQ	-	-	-	-	-	-	-	-	25	15	-	-	-	-
-	(Belgium) Thierry Tassin	GA Motorsports	Lola	Ford Cosworth	-	-	-	-	12	15	-	-	-	-	-	-	-	-	-	-	-	-	-	-	-	-
-	(Italy) Nicola Larini	Forti Corse	Dallara	Ford Cosworth	-	-	-	-	-	-	-	-	-	-	9	R	25	16	-	-	20	R	-	-	24	R
-	(Italy) Giovanna Amati	BS Automotive	Lola	Ford Cosworth	-	-	-	-	-	-	-	-	26	16	27	NQ	-	-	-	-	31	NQ	-	-	-	-
-	(West Germany) Altfrid Heger	Schäfer Racing	Ralt	Ford Cosworth	-	-	-	-	27	NQ	-	-	-	-	-	-
-	(West Germany) Altfrid Heger	GA Motorsports	Lola	Ford Cosworth													23	21	34	NQ	-	-	-	-	-	-
-	(Italy) Corrado Fabi	Genoa Racing	March	Ford Cosworth	-	-	-	-	-	-	-	-	25	R	31	NQ	-	-	-	-	-	-	29	NQ	-	-
-	(France) Gilles Lempereur	Racetech 3000	March	Ford Cosworth	-	-	-	-	-	-	-	-	-	-	-	-	-	-	-	-	-	-	30	NQ	7	R
-	(France) Alain Ferté	First Racing	March	Ford Cosworth	-	-	-	-	-	-	-	-	-	-	-	-	-	-	-	-	-	-	22	R	-	-
-	(Switzerland) Jean-Pierre Frey	Équipe Dollop	March	Ford Cosworth	32	NQ	32	NQ	34	NQ	-	-	33	NQ	34	NQ	36	NQ	33	NQ	34	NQ	-	-	-	-
-	(United Kingdom) Robert Lee-Lewis	Racetech 3000	March	Ford Cosworth	31	NQ	31	NQ	33	NQ	-	-
-	(United Kingdom) Robert Lee-Lewis	CoBRa Motorsports	March	Ford Cosworth									32	NQ	32	NQ	34	NQ	29	NQ	-	-	-	-	-	-
-	(Switzerland) Benoît Morand	Équipe Dollop	March	Ford Cosworth	-	-	-	-	-	-	-	-	34	NQ	33	NQ	-	-	-	-	-	-	-	-	-	-
-	(Italy) Nicola Tesini	EuroVenturini	Dallara	Ford Cosworth	-	-	-	-	-	-	-	-	-	-	-	-	-	-	35	NQ	33	NQ	-	-	-	-
-	(United Kingdom) John Alcorn	CoBRa Motorsports	March	Ford Cosworth	-	-	-	-	-	-	-	-	-	-	-	-	-	-	-	-	-	-	28	NQ	31	NQ
-	(Switzerland) Urs Dudler	Équipe Dollop	March	Ford Cosworth	29	NQ	-	-	-	-	-	-	-	-	-	-	-	-	-	-	-	-	-	-	-	-
-	(Italy) Alessandro Santin	Genoa Racing	March	Ford Cosworth	33	NQ	-	-	-	-	-	-	-	-	-	-	-	-	-	-	-	-	-	-	-	-
-	(Canada) Jacques-Joseph Villeneuve	Genoa Racing	March	Ford Cosworth	-	-	-	-	31	NQ	-	-	-	-	-	-	-	-	-	-	-	-	-	-	-	-
-	(Italy) Fabrizio Barbazza	Genoa Racing	March	Ford Cosworth	-	-	-	-	-	-	-	-	-	-	-	-	-	-	-	-	28	NQ	-	-	-	-
-	(Switzerland) Marzio Romano	Genoa Racing	March	Ford Cosworth	-	-	-	-	-	-	-	-	-	-	-	-	-	-	-	-	-	-	31	NQ	-	-
-	(Spain) Antonio Albacete	GA Motorsports	Lola	Ford Cosworth	-	-	-	-	-	-	-	-	-	-	-	-	-	-	-	-	-	-	-	-	30	NQ
-	(Denmark) Kris Nissen	Genoa Racing	March	Ford Cosworth	-	-	-	-	-	-	-	-	-	-	-	-	-	-	-	-	-	-	-	-	30	NQ
