= Goudchaux =

Goudchaux is a French surname. Notable people with the surname include:

- Jacques Goudchaux (born 1963), French racing driver
- Michel Goudchaux (1797–1862), French banker and politician
