= Tony de Tommaso =

Italian racing driver

Wladimiro de Tommaso
- Nationality: (Italy) Italian
- Born: 1 July 1951 (age 75) Brindisi (Italy)

Previous series
- 1981-83, 1989, 2001 1982 1988 1988 1991-92: Italian Formula 3 European Formula 3 Formula 3000; Italian Formula 2000; Indy Cars

Wladimiro "Tony" de Tommaso (born 1 July 1951) is an Italian former racing driver from Brindisi.

De Tommaso began his career in regional rallying in the late 1970s. He competed in the Italian Formula Three Championship from 1981 to 1983 without a podium finish. He returned to racing in 1988 to race in International Formula 3000, but in three attempts he failed to qualify for any races, so for 1989, he returned to Italian F3 for two races. In 1991, he attempted to make his CART World Series debut in Denver but he failed to qualify. The following year, he qualified for the CART race at Laguna Seca Raceway but crashed out 48 laps into the 84 lap event. He is now a racing instructor in Italy.

== Racing career ==
=== Complete International Formula 3000 results ===
(key) (Races in bold indicate pole position; races in italics indicate fastest lap.)

Year	Entrant	1	2	3	4	5	6	7	8	9	10	11	DC	Points
1988	Pavesi Racing	JER	VAL	PAU	SIL	MON	PER	BRH	BIR	BUG; DNQ	ZOL; DNQ	DIJ; DNQ	**NC**	**0**

=== Complete CART/Indycar results ===
Year	Team	1	2	3	4	5	6	7	8	9	10	11	12	13	14	15	16	17	Rank	Points	Ref
1991	Euromotorsports	SRF	LBH	PHX	INDY	MIL	DET	POR	CLE	MEA	TOR	MIS	DEN; DNQ	VAN	MDO	ROA	NAZ	LS	**NC**	**0**	
1992	Collex	SRF	PHX	LBH	IND	DET	POR	MIL	NHA	TOR	MIC	CLE	ROA	VAN	MDO	NAZ	LS; 22		**54th**	**0**	
