= David Hunt (racing driver) =

English racing driver (1960–2015)

- Nationality: British
- Born: David Wentworth Hunt; 20 May 1960 Belmont, Surrey, England
- Died: 11 October 2015 (aged 55) Longbridge Deverill, Wiltshire, England
- Retired: 1988
- Relatives: James Hunt (brother); Freddie Hunt (nephew)

International Formula 3000
- Years active: 1988

Previous series
- 1981–1982 1983–1987: Formula Ford; British Formula Three Championship

David Wentworth Hunt (20 May 1960 – 11 October 2015) was an English racing driver and younger brother of 1976 Formula One world champion James Hunt.

Hunt started racing at 15 and moved up to Formula Ford in 1981. He competed in the British Formula Three Championship for five seasons from 1983 to 1987 against the likes of Ayrton Senna, Martin Donnelly, Martin Brundle and Damon Hill.

Hunt's major sponsor in British F3 was Acorn Computers and, as part of his sponsorship deal, he served as a consultant to video game designer Geoff Crammond during the development of Revs. This was one of the first racing games designed to be highly realistic and helped spawn the sim racing genre. The game was based on the British F3 championship and, in addition to technical feedback to Crammond, Hunt contributed extensively to the game's manual. He advised the player on racing theory and car setup, and gave corner-by-corner guides on how to lap the game's circuits driving the Ralt RT3 featured.

Hunt raced in the International Formula 3000 championship in 1988 and in the same year tested for the Benetton Formula 1 team. He then quit racing.

At the end of 1994, Hunt sold his multi-level marketing business, selling water filters, and purchased the bankrupt Lotus team to try to save it, but had no success. He continued to work on getting Lotus back into the top echelons of motor sport until 2009, when he sold the rights to the Lotus name to the Litespeed Formula 3 team. Litespeed applied to compete in the 2010 Formula One season but was refused entry. However, BMW Sauber later announced that they would withdraw from the sport at the conclusion of the 2009 season and the selection process was re-opened. A team ran by 1Malaysia and backed by the Malaysian government was given entry for 2010, using the name Lotus Racing under licence from Lotus Cars. In the summer of 2010, 1Malaysia bought Team Lotus Ventures Ltd from David Hunt, and used the name Team Lotus for the 2011 season.

== Death ==
Hunt died in his sleep on the evening of Sunday, 11 October 2015, at the age of 55.

== Career summary ==
Season	Series	Position	Car	Team
1983	British Formula Three	12th	Ralt RT3 - Toyota	Eddie Jordan Racing
1983	European Formula Three	NC	Ralt RT3 - Toyota	Eddie Jordan Racing
1984	British Formula Three	11th	Ralt RT3 - Toyota	Acorn Computer Racing; Eddie Jordan Racing
1984	European Formula Three	16th	Ralt RT3 - Toyota	Eddie Jordan Racing
1985	British Formula Three	NC	Reynard 853 - Volkswagen	Swallow Racing
1986	British Formula Three	8th	Ralt RT30 - Volkswagen	Intersport Racing
1987	British Formula Three	NC	Ralt RT31 - Toyota	Intersport Racing
1988	International Formula 3000	24th	Lola T87/50 - Cosworth; Lola T89/50 - Cosworth	Roger Cowman Racing
1988	Formula One	Test Driver		Benetton Formula
1990	British Formula 3000	16th	Lola T89/50 - Cosworth	GA Motorsport
