= Fritz Glatz =

Austrian racing driver (1943–2002)

Friedrich "Fritz" Glatz (July 21, 1943 – July 14, 2002) was an Austrian racing driver from Vienna. He raced under the pseudonyms Pierre Chauvet and Frederico Careca as well as a number of others.

== Career ==
Glatz began his career in 1980 racing in the German Formula Three Championship. The following year he drove in that series as well as the European Formula Three Championship and made his European Formula Two Championship debut. He competed in ten Formula Two races in 1982 for Bertram Schäfer Racing but failed to score points, with a best finish of eighth. In 1983, he again made ten Formula Two starts, this time for Emco Sports but only succeeded in finishing twice and scored no points. In 1984, he returned to Emco Sports and finally broke into the points with a sixth place at Donington Park, with his single point good enough for 15th in the championship. Formula Two gave way to International Formula 3000 in 1985 and "Chauvet" only attempted two races with Oreca, failing to finish both races. In 1986, he drove in Formula 3000 nearly full-time for Jordan Racing but had a best finish of just 14th and he failed to qualify once. He also drove in two World Sports-Prototype Championship races for two teams (Roy Baker Racing in Jerez and Martin Schanche Racing in the Nürburgring, failing to score points on both occasions). Glatz was away from racing in 1987 but in 1988 returned to Formula 3000 at 45 years of age racing full-time for Racetech 3000. However, after three failures to qualify in six races, he left the team and went to Madgwick International. His best finish on the season was 12th, out of the points. He also made three World Sports-Prototype Championship starts. In 1989, he made one start in the inaugural season of British Formula 3000, which was good enough for 13th in points. He made a handful of sports car starts throughout the 1990s, mainly in Interserie.

== Death ==
In 2002, Glatz was driving a 1996-vintage Arrows Footwork FA17 Formula One car in a EuroBOSS race at Autodrom Most when his car bounced over a curb and became airborne. Glatz died from his injuries.

== Racing record ==
=== Complete European Formula Two Championship results ===
(key) (Races in bold indicate pole position; races in italics indicate fastest lap)

Year	Entrant	Chassis	Engine	1	2	3	4	5	6	7	8	9	10	11	12	13	Pos.	Pts
1981	Jo Gartner Racing	Toleman TG280	BMW	SIL	HOC	THR	NÜR	VAL	MUG	PAU	PER	SPA	DON	MIS	MAN; 16		NC	0
1982	Bertram Schäfer Racing	Maurer MM82	BMW	SIL; 13		THR; 15	NÜR	MUG; Ret	VAL; 8	PAU; DNPQ	SPA; 16	HOC; 9	DON; 14	MAN	PER; Ret	MIS; Ret	NC	0
1982	Rick Whyman Racing	Ralt RT4	Hart		HOC; 11												NC	0
1983	Emco Sports	Spirit 201	BMW	SIL; Ret	THR; Ret	HOC; Ret	NÜR	VAL; Ret	PAU; Ret	JAR; Ret	DON; 13	MIS; Ret	PER	ZOL; 12	MUG; Ret		NC	0
1984	Emco Sports	Minardi M283	BMW	SIL; Ret	HOC; Ret	THR											15th	1
1984	Emco Sports	Spirit 201B	BMW				VAL; Ret	MUG; Ret									15th	1
1984	Emco Sports	March 842	BMW						PAU; Ret	HOC; 7	MIS; 9	PER	DON; 6	BRH; 11			15th	1

=== Complete International Formula 3000 results ===
(key) (Races in bold indicate pole position; races in italics indicate fastest lap.)

Year	Entrant	Chassis	Engine	1	2	3	4	5	6	7	8	9	10	11	12	Pos.	Pts
1985	Equipe Oreca	March 85B	Cosworth	SIL; DNS	THR	EST	NÜR; C	VAL	PAU	SPA	DIJ	PER	ÖST	ZAN; Ret	DON	NC	0
1986	Eddie Jordan Racing	March 86B	Cosworth	SIL	VAL; Ret	PAU; DNQ	SPA; Ret	IMO; Ret	MUG; 18	PER	ÖST; DNQ	BIR	BUG; 14	JAR; Ret		NC	0
1988	Racetech 3000	Reynard 88D	Cosworth	JER; Ret	VAL; DNQ	PAU; Ret	SIL; 19	MNZ; DNQ	PER	BRH; DNQ	BIR					NC	0
1988	Madgwick International	Lola T88/50	Cosworth									BUG; Ret	ZOL	DIJ; 14		NC	0
