= 1988 International Formula 3000 Championship =

Motor racing competition

1988 FIA International Formula 3000 Championship

Seasons
- ← 1987 1989 →

The 1988 International Formula 3000 Championship was contested over 11 rounds. 24 different teams, 69 different drivers, 5 different chassis and 2 different engines competed.

== Drivers and teams ==
Team	Chassis	Engine	No.	Drivers	Rounds
(United Kingdom) Onyx Racing	March	Ford Cosworth	1	(Germany) Volker Weidler	All
(United Kingdom) Onyx Racing	March	Ford Cosworth	2	(Spain) Alfonso de Vinuesa	1-3
(United Kingdom) Onyx Racing	March	Ford Cosworth	2	(United Kingdom) Steve Kempton	7
(United Kingdom) Onyx Racing	March	Ford Cosworth	2	(United Kingdom) Russell Spence	9-11
(United Kingdom) Team Ralt	Ralt	Judd	3	(United Kingdom) Russell Spence	1-2
(United Kingdom) Team Ralt	Ralt	Judd	3	(New Zealand) Mike Thackwell	3
(United Kingdom) Team Ralt	Ralt	Judd	3	(Brazil) Marco Greco	4-8
(United Kingdom) Team Ralt	Ralt	Judd	3	(Netherlands) Cor Euser	9-11
(United Kingdom) Team Ralt	Ralt	Judd	4	(France) Éric Bernard	1-5
(United Kingdom) Team Ralt	Ralt	Judd	4	(Switzerland) Mario Hytten	6-8
(United Kingdom) Team Ralt	Ralt	Judd	4	(United Kingdom) Perry McCarthy	9-11
(United Kingdom) Lola Motorsport	Lola	Ford Cosworth	5	(United Kingdom) Mark Blundell	All
(United Kingdom) Lola Motorsport	Lola	Ford Cosworth	6	(France) Paul Belmondo	All
(France) Oreca Motorsport	March	Ford Cosworth	7	(France) Pierre-Henri Raphanel	1-2
(France) Oreca Motorsport	Reynard	Ford Cosworth	7	(France) Pierre-Henri Raphanel	3-11
(France) Oreca Motorsport	March	Ford Cosworth	8	(France) Jean Alesi	1-2
(France) Oreca Motorsport	Reynard	Ford Cosworth	8	(France) Jean Alesi	3-11
(Italy) First Racing	March	Judd	9	(Italy) Pierluigi Martini	1-8, 10-11
(Italy) First Racing	March	Judd	9	(France) Alain Ferté	9
(Italy) First Racing	March	Judd	10	(Italy) Marco Apicella	All
(France) GBDA Motorsport	Lola	Ford Cosworth	11	(France) Michel Trollé	1-7
(France) GBDA Motorsport	Lola	Ford Cosworth	11	(Switzerland) Jean-Denis Délétraz	9-11
(France) GBDA Motorsport	Lola	Ford Cosworth	12	(France) Olivier Grouillard	All
(Italy) Pavesi Racing	Ralt	Judd	14	(Italy) Massimo Monti	1-10
(Italy) Pavesi Racing	Ralt	Judd	14	(Italy) Ruggero Melgrati	11
(Italy) Pavesi Racing	Ralt	Judd	15	(France) Cathy Muller	1
(Italy) Pavesi Racing	Ralt	Judd	15	(Italy) Fabrizio Barbazza	2-4
(Italy) Pavesi Racing	Ralt	Judd	15	(Italy) Walter Voulaz	5
(Italy) Pavesi Racing	Ralt	Judd	15	(Italy) Fabio Mancini	6-8
(Italy) Pavesi Racing	Ralt	Judd	15	(Italy) Wladimiro De Tomaso	9-11
(United Kingdom) Madgwick International	Reynard	Ford Cosworth	16	(Netherlands) Cor Euser	1-8
(United Kingdom) Madgwick International	Reynard	Ford Cosworth	16	(United Kingdom) Andy Wallace	9
(United Kingdom) Madgwick International	Reynard	Ford Cosworth	16	(Spain) Alfonso de Vinuesa	10-11
(United Kingdom) Madgwick International	Reynard	Ford Cosworth	17	(United Kingdom) Russell Spence	3-8
(United Kingdom) Madgwick International	Reynard	Ford Cosworth	17	(Austria) Pierre Chauvet	9, 11
(United Kingdom) Madgwick International	Reynard	Ford Cosworth	17	(Brazil) Maurizio Sandro Sala	10
(Italy) Forti Corse	Dallara	Ford Cosworth	18	(Italy) Enrico Bertaggia	1-9
(Italy) Forti Corse	Lola	Ford Cosworth	18	(Italy) Enrico Bertaggia	10-11
(Italy) Forti Corse	Dallara	Ford Cosworth	19	(Argentina) Fernando Croceri	1-5
(Italy) Forti Corse	Dallara	Ford Cosworth	19	(Italy) Nino Famà	6
(Italy) Forti Corse	Dallara	Ford Cosworth	19	(Italy) Enrico Debenedetti	10-11
(Italy) Forti Corse	Lola	Ford Cosworth	20	(United Kingdom) Gary Evans	5-11
(United Kingdom) GEM Motorsport	Ralt	Ford Cosworth	20	(United Kingdom) Gary Evans	1-4
(United Kingdom) GEM Motorsport	Ralt	Ford Cosworth	21	(United Kingdom) Andy Wallace	1-4
(United Kingdom) GEM Motorsport	Reynard	Ford Cosworth	21	(United Kingdom) Andy Wallace	5-8
(United Kingdom) GEM Motorsport	Reynard	Ford Cosworth	21	(United Kingdom) Johnny Dumfries	10-11
(United Kingdom) Roni Motorsport	Lola	Ford Cosworth	22	(Switzerland) Benoît Morand	7
(Japan) Spirit TOM'S Racing	Reynard	Ford Cosworth	22	(Belgium) Éric Bachelart	9-10
(Japan) Spirit TOM'S Racing	Reynard	Ford Cosworth	22	(France) Jacques Goudchaux	11
(Japan) Spirit TOM'S Racing	Reynard	Ford Cosworth	39	(Belgium) Bertrand Gachot	All
(Japan) Spirit TOM'S Racing	Reynard	Ford Cosworth	40	(United Kingdom) Steve Kempton	1, 8
(Japan) Spirit TOM'S Racing	Reynard	Ford Cosworth	40	(Italy) Paolo Barilla	2-7
(Japan) Spirit TOM'S Racing	Reynard	Ford Cosworth	40	(Brazil) Marco Greco	9-11
(Japan) Footwork	March	Ford Cosworth	23	(Japan) Aguri Suzuki	3-4
(Japan) Footwork	Reynard	Ford Cosworth	23	(Japan) Aguri Suzuki	7
(United Kingdom) Racetech 3000	Lola	Ford Cosworth	24	(Austria) Pierre Chauvet	1-5, 7
(United Kingdom) Racetech 3000	Lola	Ford Cosworth	24	(Italy) Domenico Gitto	6
(United Kingdom) Racetech 3000	Lola	Ford Cosworth	24	(United Kingdom) James Weaver	8
(United Kingdom) Racetech 3000	Lola	Ford Cosworth	24	(France) Didier Arztet	9-11
(United States) Genoa Racing	March	Ford Cosworth	25	(Italy) Fabrizio Barbazza	5-6
(United Kingdom) Middlebridge	March	Ford Cosworth	25	(United Kingdom) Phil Andrews	8
(United Kingdom) CoBRa Motorsport	Reynard	Ford Cosworth	25	(Canada) Daniel Campeau	9-11
(United Kingdom) CoBRa Motorsport	March	Ford Cosworth	26	(Italy) Paolo Barilla	1
(United Kingdom) CoBRa Motorsport	March	Ford Cosworth	26	(Sweden) Steven Andskär	4
(United Kingdom) CoBRa Motorsport	Lola	Ford Cosworth	26	(Italy) Domenico Gitto	5
(United Kingdom) CoBRa Motorsport	Lola	Ford Cosworth	26	(Italy) Enrico Debenedetti	6-7
(United Kingdom) CoBRa Motorsport	Lola	Ford Cosworth	26	(Canada) Daniel Campeau	8
(United Kingdom) CoBRa Motorsport	Lola	Ford Cosworth	26	(Switzerland) Benoît Morand	9-10
(United Kingdom) CoBRa Motorsport	March	Ford Cosworth	27	(Switzerland) Andrea Chiesa	1
(United Kingdom) CoBRa Motorsport	Lola	Ford Cosworth	27	(Switzerland) Andrea Chiesa	2-5
(United Kingdom) CoBRa Motorsport	Reynard	Ford Cosworth	27	(Switzerland) Andrea Chiesa	6-11
(United Kingdom) GA Motorsport	Lola	Ford Cosworth	28	(Switzerland) Gregor Foitek	1-7, 9-11
(United Kingdom) GA Motorsport	Lola	Ford Cosworth	28	(United Kingdom) Perry McCarthy	8
(United Kingdom) GA Motorsport	Lola	Ford Cosworth	29	(Italy) Claudio Langes	1-9
(United Kingdom) GA Motorsport	Lola	Ford Cosworth	29	(United Kingdom) Damon Hill	10-11
(Republic of Ireland) Eddie Jordan Racing	Reynard	Ford Cosworth	30	(Sweden) Thomas Danielsson	1-5
(Republic of Ireland) Eddie Jordan Racing	Reynard	Ford Cosworth	30	(Italy) Alessandro Santin	6
(Republic of Ireland) Eddie Jordan Racing	Reynard	Ford Cosworth	30	(United Kingdom) Martin Donnelly	7-11
(Republic of Ireland) Eddie Jordan Racing	Reynard	Ford Cosworth	31	(United Kingdom) Johnny Herbert	1-2, 4-7
(Republic of Ireland) Eddie Jordan Racing	Reynard	Ford Cosworth	31	(Italy) Paolo Barilla	9-11
Colt Racing	Lola	Ford Cosworth	32	(Finland) Jari Nurminen	All
Colt Racing	Lola	Ford Cosworth	33	(Italy) Giovanna Amati	1-8
Colt Racing	Lola	Ford Cosworth	33	(France) Éric Bellefroid	9-11
(Italy) Sport Auto Racing	Lola	Ford Cosworth	35	(Switzerland) Jean-Denis Délétraz	1-6, 8
(Italy) Sport Auto Racing	Lola	Ford Cosworth	35	(Germany) Markus Oestreich	9, 11
(Italy) Sport Auto Racing	Lola	Ford Cosworth	35	(Belgium) Bernard de Dryver	10
(Italy) Sport Auto Racing	Lola	Ford Cosworth	36	(France) Fabien Giroix	1-5
(Italy) Sport Auto Racing	Lola	Ford Cosworth	36	(France) Michel Ferté	6-11
(United Kingdom) Cowman Racing	Lola	Ford Cosworth	37	(United Kingdom) David Hunt	1-5, 7-11
(United Kingdom) Cowman Racing	Lola	Ford Cosworth	38	(Italy) Franco Scapini	1-6
(United Kingdom) Cowman Racing	Lola	Ford Cosworth	44	(United States) Michael Greenfield	5
(United Kingdom) Repsol Silk Cut Racing	Lola	Ford Cosworth	41	(Spain) Fermín Vélez	1-4, 6-9
(United Kingdom) Repsol Silk Cut Racing	Lola	Ford Cosworth	41	(Italy) Claudio Langes	11
(United Kingdom) Bromley Motorsport	Reynard	Ford Cosworth	42	(Brazil) Roberto Moreno	All
(United Kingdom) Bromley Motorsport	Reynard	Ford Cosworth	43	(France) Éric Bernard	7-11
Tamchester Racing	Lola	Ford Cosworth	44	(Spain) Alfonso de Vinuesa	7-9
Tamchester Racing	Lola	Ford Cosworth	44	(Netherlands) Peter Kox	10

== Calendar ==
Round	Circuit	Date	Laps	Distance	Time	Speed	Pole position	Fastest lap	Winner
1	(Spain) Circuito de Jerez	17 April	47	4.218=198.246 km	1'17:20.02	153.811 km/h	(United Kingdom) Johnny Herbert	(France) Michel Trollé	(United Kingdom) Johnny Herbert
2	(Italy) ACI Vallelunga Circuit	8 May	63	3.2=201.6 km	1'13:49.83	163.835 km/h	(Switzerland) Gregor Foitek	(France) Michel Trollé	(Switzerland) Gregor Foitek
3	(France) Pau Grand Prix	23 May	72	2.76=201.48 km	1'29:01.76	133.924 km/h	(Brazil) Roberto Moreno	(Italy) Marco Apicella	(Brazil) Roberto Moreno
4	(United Kingdom) Silverstone Circuit	5 June	42	4.778=200.676 km	0'56:33.83	212.87 km/h	(Belgium) Bertrand Gachot	(Brazil) Roberto Moreno	(Brazil) Roberto Moreno
5	(Italy) Autodromo Nazionale Monza	26 June	14+17	5.8=179.8 km	0'51:40.552	208.763 km/h	(Brazil) Roberto Moreno	(United Kingdom) Johnny Herbert	(Brazil) Roberto Moreno
6	(Italy) Autodromo di Pergusa	17 July	3+34	4.95=183.150 km	0'56:20.62	195.035 km/h	(France) Olivier Grouillard	(Italy) Pierluigi Martini	(Italy) Pierluigi Martini
7	(United Kingdom) Brands Hatch	21 August	24+18	4.206=176.652 km	0'54:14.20	194.35 km/h	(United Kingdom) Johnny Herbert	(United Kingdom) Martin Donnelly	(United Kingdom) Martin Donnelly
8	(United Kingdom) Birmingham	29 August	43	4.04=173.72 km	1'00:19.78	173.771 km/h	(France) Olivier Grouillard	(United Kingdom) Martin Donnelly	(Brazil) Roberto Moreno
9	(France) Le Mans Bugatti Circuit	25 September	47	4.24=199.28 km	1'12:15.23	166.537 km/h	(France) Olivier Grouillard	(France) Olivier Grouillard	(France) Olivier Grouillard
10	(Belgium) Circuit Zolder	16 October	49	4.194=205.563 km	1.13:30.27	167.75 km/h	(United Kingdom) Martin Donnelly	(France) Olivier Grouillard	(France) Olivier Grouillard
11	(France) Dijon-Prenois	23 October	54	3.8=205.2 km	1.04:57.03	189.559 km/h	(Brazil) Roberto Moreno	(United Kingdom) Mark Blundell	(United Kingdom) Martin Donnelly

Note:

Race 5, 6 and 7 stopped and restarted.

== Final points standings ==
=== Driver ===
For every race points were awarded: 9 points to the winner, 6 for runner-up, 4 for third place, 3 for fourth place, 2 for fifth place and 1 for sixth place. No additional points were awarded.

Pos	Driver	JER (Spain)	VLL (Italy)	PAU (France)	SIL (United Kingdom)	MNZ (Italy)	PER (Italy)	BRH (United Kingdom)	BIR (United Kingdom)	BUG (France)	ZOL (Belgium)	DIJ (France)	Points
1	(Brazil) Roberto Moreno	Ret	4	1	1	1	Ret	Ret	1	5	5	Ret	43
2	(France) Olivier Grouillard	5	3	Ret	Ret	Ret	2	Ret	DNS	1	1	3	34
3	(United Kingdom) Martin Donnelly							1	2	2	Ret	1	30
4	(Italy) Pierluigi Martini	8	11	3	10	Ret	1	2	3		Ret	10	23
5	(Belgium) Bertrand Gachot	Ret	2	Ret	2	Ret	Ret	Ret	5	4	6	4	21
6	(United Kingdom) Mark Blundell	2	5	Ret	9	Ret	Ret	3	Ret	7	2	Ret	18
7	(Switzerland) Gregor Foitek	Ret	1	DNQ	4	4	Ret	Ret		Ret	Ret	Ret	15
8	(United Kingdom) Johnny Herbert	1	Ret		7	3	Ret	Ret					13
9	(France) Éric Bernard	6	10	4	11	DNQ		DSQ	DSQ	Ret	4	2	13
10	(France) Jean Alesi	11	9	2	5	Ret	6	Ret	Ret	Ret	9	5	11
11	(Italy) Marco Apicella	13	7	5	6	2	Ret	Ret	Ret	Ret	Ret	Ret	9
12	(France) Michel Trollé	3	6	Ret	12	Ret	3	DNQ					9
13	(Switzerland) Jean-Denis Délétraz	9	DNQ	Ret	DNQ	Ret	DNQ		10	3	3	Ret	8
14	(France) Pierre-Henri Raphanel	15	18	6	3	Ret	5	DNS	Ret	6	Ret	12	8
15	(Italy) Claudio Langes	7	Ret	10	Ret	5	4	Ret	Ret	Ret	10	Ret	5
16	(West Germany) Volker Weidler	Ret	12	DNQ	14	9	Ret	6	4	DNS	Ret	6	5
17	(Italy) Paolo Barilla	Ret	DNQ	Ret	Ret	Ret	DNQ	4		Ret	Ret	7	3
18	(France) Fabien Giroix	4	17	8	Ret	Ret							3
19	(Netherlands) Cor Euser	DNQ	8	9	DNQ	Ret	7	5	Ret	9	DNQ	DNQ	2
20	(Switzerland) Andrea Chiesa	DNQ	Ret	Ret	15	6	10	8	Ret	DNQ	13	DNS	1
21	(France) Michel Ferté						13	Ret	6	10	12	15	1
22	(Finland) Jari Nurminen	14	16	DNQ	DNQ	DNQ	Ret	Ret	7	DNQ	DNQ	9	0
23	(Italy) Enrico Bertaggia	DNQ	DNQ	DNQ	DNQ	7	16	DNS	DNQ	DNQ	11	Ret	0
24	(United Kingdom) David Hunt	DNQ	DNQ	DNQ	17	DNQ		7	Ret	14	Ret	Ret	0
25	(New Zealand) Mike Thackwell			7									0
26	(Netherlands) Peter Kox										7		0
27	(France) Paul Belmondo	Ret	14	Ret	DNQ	8	DNQ	DNQ	9	8	Ret	11	0
28	(United Kingdom) Gary Evans	DNQ	DNQ	DNQ	16	Ret	Ret	Ret	8	Ret	DNQ	DNQ	0
29	(Sweden) Thomas Danielsson	Ret	Ret	DNS	8	Ret							0
30	(Switzerland) Mario Hytten						8	Ret	Ret				0
31	(United Kingdom) Damon Hill										Ret	8	0
32	(Brazil) Maurizio Sandro Sala										8		0
33	(United Kingdom) Andy Wallace	12	Ret	DNQ	Ret	Ret	9	Ret	Ret	Ret			0
34	(Italy) Giovanna Amati	10	Ret	DNQ	DNQ	10	12	DNQ	DNQ				0
35	(United Kingdom) Russell Spence	Ret	Ret	Ret	Ret	DNQ	DNS	Ret	Ret	11	DNQ	Ret	0
36	(Japan) Aguri Suzuki			11	DNQ			Ret					0
37	(United Kingdom) Steve Kempton	DNS						DNQ	11				0
38	(Italy) Alessandro Santin						11						0
39	(Spain) Fermín Vélez	DNQ	13	DNQ	DNQ		14	DNQ	12	15			0
40	(France) Alain Ferté									12			0
41	(Italy) Massimo Monti	Ret	Ret	DNQ	13	Ret	15	DNQ	DNQ	13	DNQ		0
42	(United Kingdom) Johnny Dumfries										Ret	13	0
43	(Austria) Pierre Chauvet	Ret	DNQ	Ret	19	DNQ		DNQ		Ret		14	0
44	(France) Didier Artzet									DNQ	14	DNQ	0
45	(Italy) Franco Scapini	DNQ	15	DNQ	DNQ	DNQ	DNQ						0
46	(United Kingdom) Perry McCarthy								DNQ	Ret	Ret	16	0
47	(Italy) Fabrizio Barbazza		DNQ	DNQ	18	Ret	DNQ						0
48	(Sweden) Steven Andskär				20								0
	(Spain) Alfonso de Vinuesa	DNQ	DNQ	DNQ				DNQ	Ret	DNQ	DNQ	DNQ	
	(Brazil) Marco Greco				DNQ	DNQ	DNQ	DNQ	DNQ	DNQ	DNQ	DNQ	
	(Argentina) Fernando Croceri	DNQ	DNQ	DNQ	DNQ	DNQ							
	(Canada) Daniel Campeau								DNQ	DNQ	DNQ	DNQ	
	(Italy) Enrico Debenedetti						DNQ	DNQ			DNQ	DNQ	
	(Italy) Fabio Mancini						DNQ	DNQ	DNQ				
	(Switzerland) Benoît Morand							DNQ		DNQ	DNQ		
	(France) Éric Bellefroid									DNQ	DNQ	DNQ	
	(Italy) Wladimiro De Tomaso									DNQ	DNQ	DNQ	
	(Italy) Domenico Gitto					DNQ	DNQ						
	(Belgium) Éric Bachelart									DNQ	DNQ		
	(Germany) Markus Oestreich									DNQ		DNQ	
	(France) Cathy Muller	DNQ											
	(Italy) Walter Voulaz					DNQ							
	(United States) Michael Greenfield					DNQ							
	(Italy) Nino Famà						DNQ						
	(United Kingdom) James Weaver								DNQ				
	(United Kingdom) Phil Andrews								DNQ				
	(Belgium) Bernard de Dryver										DNQ		
	(France) Jacques Goudchaux											DNQ	
	(Italy) Ruggero Melgrati											DNQ	
Pos	Driver	JER (Spain)	VLL (Italy)	PAU (France)	SIL (United Kingdom)	MNZ (Italy)	PER (Italy)	BRH (United Kingdom)	BIR (United Kingdom)	BUG (France)	ZOL (Belgium)	DIJ (France)	Points

== Complete overview ==
first column of every race	10	= grid position

second column of every race	10	= race result

R=retired NS=did not start NQ=did not qualify NT=no time set in qualifying DIS(6)=disqualified after finishing in sixth place

Place	Name	Team	Chassis	Engine	JER (Spain)		VLL (Italy)		PAU (France)		SIL (United Kingdom)		MNZ (Italy)		PER (Italy)		BRH (United Kingdom)		BIR (United Kingdom)		BUG (France)		ZOL (Belgium)		DIJ (France)
1	(Brazil) Roberto Moreno	Bromley Motorsport	Reynard	Ford Cosworth	12	R	5	4	1	1	2	1	1	1	5	R	8	R	3	1	5	5	9	5	1	R
2	(France) Olivier Grouillard	GBDA Motorsport	Lola	Ford Cosworth	4	5	3	3	7	R	18	R	5	R	1	2	6	R	1	NS	1	1	3	1	3	3
3	(United Kingdom) Martin Donnelly	Jordan Racing	Reynard	Ford Cosworth	-	-	-	-	-	-	-	-	-	-	-	-	2	1	7	2	3	2	1	R	5	1
4	(Italy) Pierluigi Martini	First Racing	March	Judd	17	8	16	11	4	3	7	10	6	R	2	1	3	2	4	3	-	-	10	R	12	10
5	(Belgium) Bertrand Gachot	Spirit/TOM's Racing	Reynard	Ford Cosworth	3	R	6	2	6	R	1	2	2	R	24	R	5	R	16	5	6	4	8	6	8	4
6	(United Kingdom) Mark Blundell	Lola Motorsport	Lola	Ford Cosworth	5	2	10	5	20	R	11	9	4	R	16	R	7	3	6	R	18	7	2	2	2	R
7	(Switzerland) Gregor Foitek	GA Motorsports	Lola	Ford Cosworth	8	R	1	1	28	NQ	4	4	11	4	3	R	4	R	-	-	17	R	11	R	7	R
8	(United Kingdom) Johnny Herbert	Jordan Racing	Reynard	Ford Cosworth	1	1	4	R	-	-	9	7	10	3	4	R	1	R	-	-	-	-	-	-	-	-
	(France) Éric Bernard	Team Ralt	Ralt	Judd	14	6	25	10	5	4	20	11	29	NQ	-	-
	(France) Éric Bernard	Bromley Motorsport	Reynard	Ford Cosworth													19	DIS(6)	8	DIS(6)	2	R	6	4	4	2
10	(France) Jean Alesi	Oreca Motorsport	March	Ford Cosworth	24	11	21	9
10	(France) Jean Alesi	Oreca Motorsport	Reynard	Ford Cosworth					3	2	10	5	13	R	11	6	10	R	9	R	7	R	5	9	9	5
11	(Italy) Marco Apicella	First Racing	March	Judd	20	13	7	7	17	5	6	6	3	2	7	R	18	R	5	R	11	R	21	R	15	R
	(France) Michel Trollé	GBDA Motorsport	Lola	Ford Cosworth	7	3	2	6	8	R	13	12	8	R	10	3	NT	NQ	-	-	-	-	-	-	-	-
13	(France) Pierre-Henri Raphanel	Oreca Motorsport	March	Ford Cosworth	19	15	24	18
13	(France) Pierre-Henri Raphanel	Oreca Motorsport	Reynard	Ford Cosworth					2	6	3	3	16	R	6	5	9	NS	2	R	16	6	12	R	20	12
	(Switzerland) Jean-Denis Délétraz	Sport Auto Racing	Lola	Ford Cosworth	11	9	30	NQ	16	R	27	NQ	24	R	32	NQ	-	-	26	10
	(Switzerland) Jean-Denis Délétraz	GBDA Motorsport	Lola	Ford Cosworth																	4	3	4	3	16	R
15	(Italy) Claudio Langes	GA Motorsports	Lola	Ford Cosworth	15	7	8	R	18	10	15	R	12	5	8	4	11	R	12	R	14	R	26	10
15	(Italy) Claudio Langes	Repsol Silk Cut Racing	Lola	Ford Cosworth																					22	R
	(West Germany) Volker Weidler	Onyx Racing	March	Ford Cosworth	21	R	20	12	26	NQ	17	14	26	9	18	R	13	6	14	4	10	NS	24	R	6	6
17	(France) Fabien Giroix	Sport Auto Racing	Lola	Ford Cosworth	2	4	9	17	13	8	16	R	15	R	-	-	-	-	-	-	-	-	-	-	-	-
	(Italy) Paolo Barilla	CoBRa Motorsports	March	Ford Cosworth	23	R
	(Italy) Paolo Barilla	Spirit/TOM's Racing	Reynard	Ford Cosworth			31	NQ	9	R	8	R	19	R	29	NQ	22	4	-	-
	(Italy) Paolo Barilla	Jordan Racing	Reynard	Ford Cosworth																	8	R	22	R	14	7
19	(Netherlands) Cor Euser	Madgwick International	Reynard	Ford Cosworth	27	NQ	13	8	11	9	30	NQ	9	R	21	7	14	5	11	R
19	(Netherlands) Cor Euser	Team Ralt	Ralt	Judd																	12	9	28	NQ	31	NQ
20	(Switzerland) Andrea Chiesa	CoBRa Motorsports	March	Ford Cosworth	32	NQ
20	(Switzerland) Andrea Chiesa	CoBRa Motorsports	Lola	Ford Cosworth			18	R	12	R	21	15	14	6	20	10
20	(Switzerland) Andrea Chiesa	CoBRa Motorsports	Reynard	Ford Cosworth													25	8	10	R	30	NQ	14	13	18	NS
	(France) Michel Ferté	Sport Auto Racing	Lola	Ford Cosworth	-	-	-	-	-	-	-	-	-	-	25	13	12	R	15	6	15	10	25	12	23	15
-	(Finland) Jari Nurminen	Colt Racing	Lola	Ford Cosworth	16	14	19	16	30	NQ	32	NQ	27	NQ	13	R	24	R	13	7	27	NQ	31	NQ	13	9
-	(Italy) Enrico Bertaggia	Forti Corse	Dallara	Ford Cosworth	34	NQ	27	NQ	24	NQ	34	NQ	21	7	19	16	26	NS	31	NQ	35	NQ
-	(Italy) Enrico Bertaggia	Forti Corse	Lola	Ford Cosworth																			13	11	17	R
-	(United Kingdom) David Hunt	Cowman Racing	Lola	Ford Cosworth	31	NQ	29	NQ	32	NQ	23	17	30	NQ	-	-	23	7	20	R	26	14	16	R	24	R
-	(New Zealand) Mike Thackwell	Team Ralt	Ralt	Judd	-	-	-	-	10	7	-	-	-	-	-	-	-	-	-	-	-	-	-	-	-	-
-	(Netherlands) Peter Kox	Tamchester Racing	Reynard	Ford Cosworth	-	-	-	-	-	-	-	-	-	-	-	-	-	-	-	-	-	-	23	7	-	-
-	(France) Paul Belmondo	Lola Motorsport	Lola	Ford Cosworth	18	R	17	14	19	R	28	NQ	23	8	27	NQ	30	NQ	17	9	9	8	7	R	11	11
-	(United Kingdom) Gary Evans	GEM Motorsport	Ralt	Ford Cosworth	28	NQ	28	NQ	25	NQ	22	16
-	(United Kingdom) Gary Evans	Forti Corse	Lola	Ford Cosworth									25	R	9	R	16	R	19	8	23	R	30	NQ	NT	NQ
-	(Sweden) Thomas Danielsson	Jordan Racing	Reynard	Ford Cosworth	6	R	15	R	15	NS	14	8	7	R	-	-	-	-	-	-	-	-	-	-	-	-
-	(Switzerland) Mario Hytten	Team Ralt	Ralt	Judd	-	-	-	-	-	-	-	-	-	-	23	8	20	R	23	R	-	-	-	-	-	-
-	(United Kingdom) Damon Hill	GA Motorsports	Lola	Ford Cosworth	-	-	-	-	-	-	-	-	-	-	-	-	-	-	-	-	-	-	18	R	10	8
-	(Brazil) Maurizio Sandro Sala	Madgwick International	Reynard	Ford Cosworth	-	-	-	-	-	-	-	-	-	-	-	-	-	-	-	-	-	-	19	8	-	-
-	(United Kingdom) Andy Wallace	GEM Motorsport	Ralt	Ford Cosworth	25	12	14	R	23	NQ	19	R
-	(United Kingdom) Andy Wallace	GEM Motorsport	Reynard	Ford Cosworth									22	R	14	9	17	R	18	R
-	(United Kingdom) Andy Wallace	Madgwick International	Reynard	Ford Cosworth																	13	R	-	-	-	-
-	(Italy) Giovanna Amati	Colt Racing	Lola	Ford Cosworth	13	10	12	R	36	NQ	29	NQ	20	10	20	12	33	NQ	30	NQ	-	-	-	-	-	-
-	(United Kingdom) Russell Spence	Team Ralt	Ralt	Judd	9	R	22	R
-	(United Kingdom) Russell Spence	Madgwick International	Reynard	Ford Cosworth					14	R	5	R	36	NQ	12	NS	21	R	22	R
-	(United Kingdom) Russell Spence	Onyx Racing	March	Ford Cosworth																	21	11	32	NQ	19	R
-	(Japan) Aguri Suzuki	Footwork	March	Ford Cosworth	-	-	-	-	22	11	37	NQ	-	-	-	-
-	(Japan) Aguri Suzuki	Footwork	Reynard	Ford Cosworth													15	R	-	-	-	-	-	-	-	-
-	(United Kingdom) Steve Kempton	Spirit/TOM's Racing	Reynard	Ford Cosworth	22	NS	-	-	-	-	-	-	-	-	-	-			25	11	-	-	-	-	-	-
-	(United Kingdom) Steve Kempton	Onyx Racing	March	Ford Cosworth													36	NQ
-	(Italy) Alessandro Santin	Jordan Racing	Reynard	Ford Cosworth	-	-	-	-	-	-	-	-	-	-	17	11	-	-	-	-	-	-	-	-	-	-
-	(Spain) Fermín Vélez	Repsol Silk Cut Racing	Lola	Ford Cosworth	29	NQ	26	13	29	NQ	33	NQ	-	-	26	14	27	NQ	24	12	24	15	-	-	-	-
-	(France) Alain Ferté	First Racing	March	Judd	-	-	-	-	-	-	-	-	-	-	-	-	-	-	-	-	20	12	-	-	-	-
-	(Italy) Massimo Monti	Pavesi Racing	Ralt	Judd	10	R	11	R	35	NQ	24	13	17	R	15	15	NT	NQ	33	NQ	25	13	33	NQ	-	-
-	(United Kingdom) Johnny Dumfries	GEM Motorsport	Reynard	Ford Cosworth	-	-	-	-	-	-	-	-	-	-	-	-	-	-	-	-	-	-	20	R	26	13
-	(Austria) Pierre Chauvet	Racetech 3000	Lola	Ford Cosworth	26	R	33	NQ	21	R	12	19	37	NQ	-	-	28	NQ	-	-
-	(Austria) Pierre Chauvet	Madgwick International	Reynard	Ford Cosworth																	22	R	-	-	25	14
-	(France) Didier Artzet	Racetech 3000	Lola	Ford Cosworth	-	-	-	-	-	-	-	-	-	-	-	-	-	-	-	-	29	NQ	17	14	NT	NQ
-	(Italy) Franco Scapini	Cowman Racing	Lola	Ford Cosworth	33	NQ	23	15	34	NQ	36	NQ	33	NQ	31	NQ	-	-	-	-	-	-	-	-	-	-
-	(United Kingdom) Perry McCarthy	GA Motorsports	Lola	Ford Cosworth	-	-	-	-	-	-	-	-	-	-	-	-	-	-	27	NQ
-	(United Kingdom) Perry McCarthy	Team Ralt	Ralt	Judd																	19	R	15	R	21	16
-	(Italy) Fabrizio Barbazza	Pavesi Racing	Ralt	Judd	-	-	35	NQ	27	NQ	25	18
-	(Italy) Fabrizio Barbazza	Genoa Racing	March	Ford Cosworth									18	R	28	NQ	-	-	-	-	-	-	-	-	-	-
-	(Sweden) Steven Andskär	CoBRa Motorsports	March	Ford Cosworth	-	-	-	-	-	-	26	20	-	-	-	-	-	-	-	-	-	-	-	-	-	-
-	(Spain) Alfonso de Vinuesa	Onyx Racing	March	Ford Cosworth	35	NQ	32	NQ	33	NQ	-	-	-	-	-	-
-	(Spain) Alfonso de Vinuesa	Tamchester Racing	Reynard	Ford Cosworth													31	NQ	21	R	37	NQ
-	(Spain) Alfonso de Vinuesa	Madgwick International	Reynard	Ford Cosworth																			29	NQ	28	NQ
-	(Brazil) Marco Greco	Team Ralt	Ralt	Judd	-	-	-	-	-	-	35	NQ	34	NQ	34	NQ	29	NQ	28	NQ
-	(Brazil) Marco Greco	Spirit/TOM's Racing	Reynard	Ford Cosworth																	31	NQ	35	NQ	30	NQ
-	(Argentina) Fernando Croceri	Forti Corse	Dallara	Ford Cosworth	36	NQ	34	NQ	31	NQ	31	NQ	28	NQ	-	-	-	-	-	-	-	-	-	-	-	-
-	(Canada) Daniel Campeau	CoBRa Motorsports	Lola	Ford Cosworth	-	-	-	-	-	-	-	-	-	-	-	-	-	-	29	NQ
-	(Canada) Daniel Campeau	CoBRa Motorsports	Reynard	Ford Cosworth																	33	NQ	34	NQ	27	NQ
-	(Italy) Enrico Debenedetti	CoBRa Motorsports	Lola	Ford Cosworth	-	-	-	-	-	-	-	-	-	-	33	NQ	34	NQ	-	-	-	-
-	(Italy) Enrico Debenedetti	Forti Corse	Dallara	Ford Cosworth																			27	NQ	36	NQ
-	(Italy) Fabio Mancini	Pavesi Racing	Ralt	Judd	-	-	-	-	-	-	-	-	-	-	NT	NQ	35	NQ	34	NQ	-	-	-	-	-	-
-	(Switzerland) Benoît Morand	Roni Motorsport	Lola	Ford Cosworth	-	-	-	-	-	-	-	-	-	-	-	-	32	NQ	-	-
-	(Switzerland) Benoît Morand	CoBRa Motorsports	Lola	Ford Cosworth									-	-	-	-	-	-	-	-	34	NQ	38	NQ	-	-
-	(France) Éric Bellefroid	Colt Racing	Lola	Ford Cosworth	-	-	-	-	-	-	-	-	-	-	-	-	-	-	-	-	28	NQ	36	NQ	29	NQ
-	(Italy) Wladimiro De Tomaso	Pavesi Racing	Ralt	Judd	-	-	-	-	-	-	-	-	-	-	-	-	-	-	-	-	38	NQ	39	NQ	34	NQ
-	(Italy) Domenico Gitto	CoBRa Motorsports	Lola	Ford Cosworth	-	-	-	-	-	-	-	-	31	NQ
-	(Italy) Domenico Gitto	Racetech 3000	Lola	Ford Cosworth											35	NQ	-	-	-	-	-	-	-	-	-	-
-	(Belgium) Éric Bachelart	Spirit/TOM's Racing	Reynard	Ford Cosworth	-	-	-	-	-	-	-	-	-	-	-	-	-	-	-	-	32	NQ	37	NQ	-	-
-	(West Germany) Markus Oestreich	Sport Auto Racing	Lola	Ford Cosworth	-	-	-	-	-	-	-	-	-	-	-	-	-	-	-	-	36	NQ	-	-	33	NQ
-	(France) Cathy Muller	Pavesi Racing	Ralt	Judd	30	NQ	-	-	-	-	-	-	-	-	-	-	-	-	-	-	-	-	-	-	-	-
-	(Italy) Walter Voulaz	Pavesi Racing	Ralt	Judd	-	-	-	-	-	-	-	-	32	NQ	-	-	-	-	-	-	-	-	-	-	-	-
-	(United States) Michael Greenfield	Cowman Racing	Lola	Ford Cosworth	-	-	-	-	-	-	-	-	35	NQ	-	-	-	-	-	-	-	-	-	-	-	-
-	(Italy) Nino Famà	Forti Corse	Dallara	Ford Cosworth	-	-	-	-	-	-	-	-	-	-	30	NQ	-	-	-	-	-	-	-	-	-	-
-	(United Kingdom) James Weaver	Racetech 3000	Lola	Ford Cosworth	-	-	-	-	-	-	-	-	-	-	-	-	-	-	32	NQ	-	-	-	-	-	-
-	(United Kingdom) Phil Andrews	Middlebridge	March	Ford Cosworth	-	-	-	-	-	-	-	-	-	-	-	-	-	-	35	NQ	-	-	-	-	-	-
-	(Belgium) Bernard de Dryver	Sport Auto Racing	Lola	Ford Cosworth	-	-	-	-	-	-	-	-	-	-	-	-	-	-	-	-	-	-	40	NQ	-	-
-	(France) Jacques Goudchaux	Spirit/TOM's Racing	Reynard	Ford Cosworth	-	-	-	-	-	-	-	-	-	-	-	-	-	-	-	-	-	-	-	-	32	NQ
-	(Italy) Ruggero Melgrati	Pavesi Racing	Ralt	Judd	-	-	-	-	-	-	-	-	-	-	-	-	-	-	-	-	-	-	-	-	35	NQ
