= Alessandro Santin =

Italian race car driver (born 1958)

Alessandro Santin (born 6 October 1958 in Venice, Italy) is an Italian former race car driver.

Santin's main title was in the Italian Formula Three Championship in 1984, in which he drove a Ralt-Alfa to four wins. From 1985 to 1988, Santin drove in the European Formula 3000 championship for many teams (Sanremo in 1985; Coloni, Sanremo, Lola Sport, Eddie Jordan Racing and Formula Team in 1986; Genoa in 1987 and Eddie Jordan Racing in 1988), without great results. His better results were two sixth places in Silverstone and Vallelunga in 1986, driving a Lola T86/50. His best start position was in Mugello in 1986, when he started from the second position, also driving a Lola T86/50.

Santin has also raced in prototypes championships and drove in the 1989 Le Mans 24 Hours with Pascal Fabre. Nowadays, he attends historical Formula 3 events in Italy.

== Racing record ==
=== Complete International Formula 3000 results ===
(key) (Races in bold indicate pole position; races in italics indicate fastest lap.)

Year	Entrant	Chassis	Engine	1	2	3	4	5	6	7	8	9	10	11	12	Pos.	Pts
1985	San Remo Racing	March 85B	Cosworth	SIL; Ret	THR; 9	EST; Ret	NÜR; C	VAL; Ret	PAU	SPA	DIJ	PER; 7	ÖST; 7	ZAN; 7	DON; 9	NC	0
1986	Lola Motorsport	Lola T86/50	Cosworth	SIL; 6	VAL; 6	PAU; Ret	SPA; 10		MUG; Ret							19th	1.5
1986	Formula Team Ltd	Lola T86/50	Cosworth					IMO; 7								19th	1.5
1986	Eddie Jordan Racing	March 86B	Cosworth							PER; 8						19th	1.5
1986	Coloni Racing	March 85B	Cosworth								ÖST; 17	BIR; 12				19th	1.5
1986	San Remo Racing	March 86B	Cosworth										BUG; Ret	JAR; Ret		19th	1.5
1987	Genoa Racing	March 87B	Cosworth	SIL; DNQ	VAL	SPA	PAU	DON	PER	BRH	BIR	IMO	BUG	JAR		NC	0
1988	Eddie Jordan Racing	Reynard 88D	Cosworth	JER	VAL	PAU	SIL	MNZ	PER; 11	BRH	BIR	BUG	ZOL	DIJ		NC	0

Sporting positions
Preceded by Ivan Capelli	Italian Formula Three Champion; 1984	Succeeded by Franco Forini
