= March 88B =

- Category: Formula 3000
- Constructor: March
- Designer(s): Gordon Coppuck; Andy Brown

Technical specifications
- Chassis: Aluminum/carbon fiber monocoque with rear sub-frame covered in fiberglass body
- Suspension (front): Double wishbones, Coil springs over shock absorbers, Anti-roll bar
- Suspension (rear): Twin lower links, Single top links, twin trailing arms, Coil springs over shock absorbers, Anti-roll bar
- Wheelbase: 3,000 mm (118 in)
- Engine: Ford-Cosworth DFV, mid-engined, longitudinally mounted, 3.0 L (183.1 cu in), 90°, V8, DOHC, NA
- Transmission: Hewland 5-speed manual
- Power: 470 hp (350 kW)
- Weight: 545 kg (1,202 lb)
- Tyres: Avon

Competition history
- Debut: 1988

The March 88B was an open-wheel formula race car, designed, developed and built by British manufacturer March Engineering, for Formula 3000 racing categories, in 1988.
