= Dominique Delestre =

French former racing driver

Dominique Jean Pierre Maria Delestre (born 18 February 1955) is a French former racing driver. Delestre was born in Nancy, France. In 1989 he founded Apomatox F3000 racing team which will race until 1998.
