= Giovanna Amati =

Italian racing driver (born 1959)

- Born: 20 July 1959 (age 67); Rome, Italy

Formula One World Championship career
- Nationality: (Italy) Italian
- Active years: 1992
- Team: Brabham
- Entries: 3 (0 starts)
- Championships: 0
- Wins: 0
- Podiums: 0
- Career points: 0
- Pole positions: 0
- Fastest laps: 0
- First entry: 1992 South African Grand Prix
- Last entry: 1992 Brazilian Grand Prix

Giovanna Amati (Italian pronunciation: [dʒoˈvanna aˈmaːti]) (born 20 July 1959) is an Italian former professional racing driver. She is the most recent female driver to have entered the Formula One World Championship.

Brought up in a wealthy background, Amati was kidnapped in 1978 before being released on an 800 million lira ransom.

Amati started her racing career in Formula Abarth series, before moving up into Formula Three for 1985–86. An entry into Formula 3000 in 1987 brought little success but the following year, Amati improved her performances. She moved to Japan for 1989 but still had no success. A move back to Europe in 1990 saw better performances that continued into 1991. In 1992, Amati became the fifth and last woman Formula One driver when she signed for Brabham.

== Early life ==
Amati was born in Rome on 20 July 1959, to actress Anna Maria Pancani and theatre-chain owner Giovanni Amati. As a child, she displayed a passion for cars and expressed the wish to attend a motor racing academy when older.

=== Kidnapping ===
At the age of 18, Amati was kidnapped for ransom on 12 February 1978 by three gangsters in a group led by Jean Daniel Nieto. Amati was forcibly removed from a car she was sitting in near her parents' villa in Rome and was taken away in a van. Her captors initially took her to a house near her parents' home, but moved her to a remote location after police called at the house. Amati was kept in a wooden cage for 75 days and was physically and mentally abused although Nieto occasionally comforted her. Amati was released on an 800 million-lira ($933,000 at the time) ransom on 27 April 1978 after two months of captivity. As the Italian authorities had introduced a policy of freezing the assets belonging to the families of kidnapped people in an attempt to fight organised crime by preventing ransom payments, Amati's parents were able to pay the ransom by using box office receipts from the film Star Wars, selling family jewellery and borrowing money from their servants' life savings.

Nieto, a French citizen, was later arrested after a meeting with Amati arranged by the police. When he was released, newspapers published stories detailing Amati's Stockholm syndrome and the strong emotional relationship between her and her captor, though Amati herself denied those claims. He was sentenced to 18 years in prison. Nieto escaped prison in 1989 and remained a fugitive until he was arrested again in April 2010.

== Career ==
=== Early career ===
To improve her driving skills, Amati attended a motor racing school together with her friend, Elio de Angelis. She began racing professionally in the Formula Abarth series in 1981, winning several times over the next four years. In 1985–86, she moved up to Italian Formula Three, again running a successful campaign and scoring a few wins. In 1987, she graduated to Formula 3000. She entered three races, but only qualified once at Donington. Amati competed again in F3000 in 1988 with Lola and managed to secure two tenth places at Monza and Jerez. In 1989, Amati moved to Japan and competed for a brief period in the Super Formula Championship with little success. In 1990, she returned to Europe to the International F3000. Within the first four rounds, she raced with Roni Motorsports in a Reynard 90D Cosworth before moving to Lola for round five. Her final team change was to Cobra Motorsports for the five remaining races. In 1990, Amati was involved in a crash with British driver Phil Andrews, when they collided during a test session prior to the Brands Hatch race that year. They both reported minor injuries.

In 1991, Amati joined GJ Motorsports driving a Reynard 91D Cosworth for the entire season. She qualified for six rounds and managed to score a few non-point paying top-ten finishes, although she never scored any points. By the end of the year, Amati tested a Formula One car for the first time, completing 30 laps on a Benetton.

=== Formula One ===
Amati signed with the Brabham team in January 1992 to partner Eric van de Poele after the team was unable to sign Japanese F3000 driver Akihiko Nakaya, who was not granted a superlicence due to the FIA not recognising the Japanese F3000 series as a stepping stone in motor racing. Amati was the first female driver to enter a Formula One race since Desiré Wilson in 1980 and the announcement earned a great degree of publicity for the then struggling Brabham team. During the first round in South Africa, mechanics were still busy making her a seat.

In South Africa, Amati's inexperience showed on the track. She spun six times during practice and was unable to qualify after setting a time that was nine seconds slower than pole sitter Nigel Mansell and four seconds slower than teammate van de Poele, who qualified in last place.

At the Mexican Grand Prix, Amati failed to qualify again, again setting a time nearly nine seconds slower than Mansell, and three seconds slower than van de Poele, who also failed to qualify.

Amati's last attempt to qualify a Formula One car was in Brazil. She and van de Poele lapped respectively eleven and six seconds slower than Mansell, and were excluded from the race. In all three sessions, Amati recorded the slowest time by a considerable margin. Brabham sacked Amati and replaced her with future 1996 World Champion Damon Hill. Hill failed to qualify for the next five races until he successfully put the car on the grid for the 1992 British Grand Prix, although he lapped over eight seconds slower than pole sitter Mansell. As of 2025, Amati is the last female driver who has attempted to qualify a Formula One car.

=== Post-Formula One career ===
Amati went into the Porsche SuperCup for 1993 to win the Women's European Championship. From 1994 to 1996, she raced in the Ferrari Challenge. She took a sabbatical in 1997 before returning in 1998 with a Ferrari 355. She also raced in the International Sports Racing Series driving an Alfa Romeo Giudici Gaiero SPN. Amati competed in the 1998 Sebring 12 Hours in a BMW M3, driving alongside Craig Carter and Andy Petery but retired due to clutch trouble. She also entered the 1000 km of Monza alongside Loic Depailler, Marco Lucchinelli, and Xavier Pompidou but they were unable to start. Amati then finished 11th at Le Mans during a two-hour race alongside Guido Knycz and Giovanni Gulinelli. In 1999, Amati raced in the SportsRacing World Cup driving a Tampolli SR2 RTA-99 for the Cauduro Tampolli team alongside Angelo Lancelotti in the SR2 class. She finished third in the SR2 class at the end of the year.

Following her retirement from motor sport, Amati worked briefly as a sport commentator, writing columns for Italian motorsport publications and providing television commentary.

== Racing record ==
=== Complete International Formula 3000 results ===
(key) (Races in bold indicate pole position) (Races in italics indicate fastest lap)

Year	Entrant	Chassis	Engine	Tyres	1	2	3	4	5	6	7	8	9	10	11	DC	Points
1987	BS Automotive	Lola T87/50	Ford Cosworth	A	SIL	VAL	SPA	PAU	DON; 16	PER; DNQ	BRH	BIR	IMO; DNQ	BUG	JAR	NC	0
1988	Colt Racing	Lola T88/50	Ford Cosworth	A	JER; 10	VAL; Ret	PAU; DNQ	SIL; DNQ	MNZ; 10	PER; 12	BRH; DNQ	BIR; DNQ	BUG	ZOL	DIJ	NC	0
1990	Roni Motorsport	Reynard 90D	Ford Cosworth	A	DON; Ret	SIL; DNQ	PAU; DNQ	JER; DNQ								NC	0
1990	Roni Motorsport	Lola T89/50	Ford Cosworth	A					MNZ; DNQ							NC	0
1990	Colin Bennett Racing	Reynard 90D	Mugen Honda	A						PER; DNQ	HOC; 15	BRH; DNQ	BIR; DNQ	BUG; DNQ	NOG	NC	0
1991	GJ Motorsports	Reynard 91D	Ford Cosworth	A	VAL; DNQ	PAU; Ret	JER; DNQ	MUG; 14	PER; Ret	HOC; 9	BRH; 19	SPA; DNQ	BUG; 7	NOG; Ret		NC	0

=== Complete Formula One results ===
(key)

Year	Entrant	Chassis	Engine	1	2	3	4	5	6	7	8	9	10	11	12	13	14	15	16	WDC	Points
1992	Brabham	Brabham BT60B	Judd 3.5 L V10	RSA; DNQ	MEX; DNQ	BRA; DNQ	ESP	SMR	MON	CAN	FRA	GBR	GER	HUN	BEL	ITA	POR	JPN	AUS	NC	0

== See also ==
- List of female Formula One drivers
