= Jari Nurminen =

Finnish racing driver from Helsinki (born 1961)

Jari Nurminen (born 10 November 1961) is a Finnish racing driver from Helsinki.

== Racing career ==
=== Formula cars ===
Nurminen began his racing career racing Formula Vee cars in his native Finland. In 1983, he finished third in the Finnish Formula Three Championship and competed in four German Formula Three Championship races. In 1984 and 1985, he finished fifth in German F3 in back-to-back years, capturing his first win in 1985. In 1986, he competed in a full season of International Formula 3000 with the EuroVenturini team but only managed to qualify for one of the eleven races, the season opener at Brands Hatch. He also did some tests for the Arrows Formula One team. Despite the disastrous 1986 campaign, Nurminen returned to the team and series in 1987. After failing to qualify for three of the first four races, he switched teams to GA Motorsports, where he qualified for four of the next six races, scoring a best finish of 15th at Österreichring. He returned to the series in 1988 and drove a full season for Colt Racing. He qualified for all but two of the races and finished seventh at the Birmingham Superprix, just one spot out of the points.

=== Sports cars ===
In 1989, Nurminen moved to sports car racing in the World Sports-Prototype Championship, making 10 starts in 1989 and 1990. Nurminen was out of racing until 1997 when he competed in three FIA GT Championship races and the 1997 24 Hours of Le Mans in the Chamberlain Engineering Chrysler Viper GTS-R, which finished sixth in class and 15th overall in an attrition-filled race. From 2002 to 2005, Nurminen drove in several low-profile Finnish series such as the Yaris Cup and Legends Trophy. From 2006 to 2008, he competed in the Scandinavian Ferrari Challenge series, winning the title in 2007. In 2009, he brought his Ferrari F430 Challenge to the Finnish GT3 Championship, finishing fifth in points in 2009 and fourth in 2010. For 2011, he moved to the Swedish Camaro Cup series, where he remained in 2012. He continued in the Finnish and Swedish V8 Thundercars series until his retirement after the 2017 season.
