= Gary Evans (racing driver) =

British former racing driver

Gary Evans (born 21 October 1960) is a British former racing driver. Evans spent 4 years in Formula 3000 in the late 80's, 3 with his own GEM (Gary Evans Motorsport) team.

== Racing record ==
=== Complete International Formula 3000 results ===
(key) (Races in bold indicate pole position; races in italics indicate fastest lap.)

Year	Entrant	Chassis	Engine	1	2	3	4	5	6	7	8	9	10	11	Pos.	Pts
1986	GEM	Lola T86/50	Cosworth	SIL; 7	VAL; 16	PAU; DNQ	SPA; 20	IMO; DNQ	MUG; 10	PER; 10	ÖST; 10	BIR; 16	BUG; DNQ	JAR; Ret	NC	0
1987	GEM	Ralt RT21	Cosworth	SIL; DNQ	VAL; DNQ	SPA; 6	PAU; DNQ	DON; 20	PER; 10	BRH; 10	BIR; Ret	IMO; Ret	BUG; 12	JAR; Ret	21st	0.5
1988	GEM	Ralt RT22	Cosworth	JER; DNQ	VAL; DNQ	PAU; DNQ	SIL; 16								NC	0
1988	GEM	Reynard 88D	Cosworth					MNZ; Ret	PER; Ret	BRH; Ret	BIR; 8	BUG; Ret	ZOL; DNQ	DIJ; DNQ	NC	0
1989	Madgwick International	Reynard 89D	Cosworth	SIL; Ret	VAL; 11	PAU; Ret	JER; 17	PER; 5	BRH; Ret	BIR; Ret	SPA; 16	BUG; DNQ	DIJ; DNQ		20th	2
