= Alfonso de Vinuesa =

Spanish racing driver

Alfonso García de Vinuesa (13 December 1958 – 24 May 1997) was a Spanish racing driver from Madrid.

== Racing career ==
De Vinuesa made his professional racing debut in 1984 in the European Formula Three Championship driving for Eddie Jordan Racing at the last race of the season, at Jarama, where he unexpectedly qualified third.

In 1985, de Vinuesa made four German Formula Three Championship starts for Josef Kaufmann Racing and finished 24th in points. In 1986, he made seven German F3 starts for Malte Bongers Motorsport, won once and finished seventh in points. He also made his International Formula 3000 debut for Peter Gethin Racing.

In 1987, de Vinuesa returned to International F3000 full-time for BS Automotive but was injured in the third race of the season at Circuit de Spa-Francorchamps. The concussion he sustained at Spa was underestimated and when he made his come-back he was not the same anymore and wasn't as quick as he had previously been.

De Vinuesa returned later in the season for two races but failed to make the field in both of them. The single point he scored in the first race was good enough for 19th in points.

In 1988, de Vinuesa returned to F3000 for Onyx Racing but failed to qualify for the first three races of the season and left the team. He returned for three races with Tamchester Racing but failed to qualify for two of them and failed to finish the one he made. He was entered in the final two races of the season for Madgwick International but failed to qualify for both of those as well. These would be de Vinuesa's final professional racing appearances.

== Personal life and death ==
De Vinuesa had a tragic life outside of racing. His first love died in a skiing accident. After his racing career, ended he founded an advertising agency but his largest client went bankrupt in 1994 and the company shut down. His brother committed suicide in 1993. His first marriage ended in divorce and when he was engaged again in April 1997, his fiancée was killed in a traffic accident. Alfonso García de Vinuesa was killed little more than a month later when he was hit by a truck on a highway in Madrid when he was checking his car for a mechanical problem.

== Racing record ==
=== Complete International Formula 3000 results ===
(key) (Races in bold indicate pole position; races in italics indicate fastest lap.)

Year	Entrant	Chassis	Engine	1	2	3	4	5	6	7	8	9	10	11	Pos.	Pts
1986	Peter Gethin Racing	March 86B	Cosworth	SIL	VAL	PAU	SPA	IMO	MUG	PER	ÖST	BIR	BUG	JAR; Ret	NC	0
1987	BS Automotive	Lola T87/50	Cosworth	SIL; 6	VAL; Ret	SPA; 16	PAU	DON	PER	BRH; DNQ	BIR; DNQ	IMO	BUG	JAR	19th	1
1988	Onyx Racing	March 88B	Cosworth	JER; DNQ	VAL; DNQ	PAU; DNQ	SIL	MNZ	PER						NC	0
1988	Tamchester Racing	Reynard 88D	Cosworth							BRH; DNQ	BIR; Ret	BUG; DNQ			NC	0
1988	Madgwick International	Reynard 88D	Cosworth										ZOL; DNQ	DIJ; DNQ	NC	0
