= Jacques Goudchaux =

French racing driver

Jacques Goudchaux (born 21 August 1963) is a French former racing driver.
