= 1984 Jochen Rindt Memorial Trophy =

1984 Thruxton Grand Prix

Race details
- Date: 23 April 1984
- Official name: 28th B.A.R.C. "200"
- Location: Hampshire, England
- Course: Thruxton Circuit
- Course length: 3.793 km (2.356 miles)
- Distance: 55 laps, 208.615 km (129.580 miles)

Pole position
Driver	(New Zealand) Mike Thackwell	Ralt-Honda
- Time: 1:05.68

Fastest lap
Driver	(New Zealand) Mike Thackwell	Ralt-Honda
- Time: 1:07.38

Podium
First	(New Zealand) Mike Thackwell	Ralt-Honda
Second	(Germany) Christian Danner	March-BMW
Third	(France) Philippe Streiff	AGS-BMW

The 28th B.A.R.C. "200" meeting, saw the 13th running of the P&O Ferries sponsored Jochen Rindt Memorial Trophy. This was the third round of the 1984 European Championship for F2 Drivers, and held at Thruxton Circuit, in Hampshire, on 23 April.

== Report ==
=== Entry ===
A total of 20 F2 cars were entered for the event, but come qualifying two of these did not arrive in Hampshire.

=== Qualifying ===
Mike Thackwell took pole position for Ralt Racing Ltd, in their Ralt-Honda RH6, averaging a speed of 129.148 mph (207.844 km/h).

=== Race ===
The race was held over 55 laps of the Thruxton circuit. Mike Thackwell took the winner spoils for works Ralt team, driving their Ralt-Honda RH6. The Kiwi won in a time of 1hr 03:11.78mins., averaging a speed of 123.038 mph (198.010 km/h). Just over 21 seconds behind was the Cheylesmore/BS Automotive March of Christian Danner. The third different car in the top three was the AGS-BMW JH19C of Philippe Streiff.

== Classification ==
=== Race Result ===
Pos.	No.	Driver	Entrant	Car – Engine	Time, Laps	Reason Out
1st	1	(New Zealand) Mike Thackwell	Ralt Racing Ltd	Ralt-Honda RH6	1hr 03:11.78	
2nd	66	(Germany) Christian Danner	Cheylesmore/BS Automotive	March-BMW 842	1hr 03:33.05	
3rd	6	(France) Philippe Streiff	Elf Gitanes AGS (Armagnac Bigorre)	AGS-BMW JH19C	1hr 04:22.51	
4th	4	(Italy) Emanuele Pirro	Onyx Race Engineering	March-BMW 842	54	
5th	3	(Belgium) Thierry Tassin	Onyx Race Engineering	March-BMW 842	54	
6th	18	(Belgium) Didier Theys	Martini Racing France/ORECA	Martini-BMW 002	54	
7th	10	(Italy) Alessandro Nannini	Minardi Team	Minardi-BMW M283	53	
8th	15	(Italy) Guido Daccò	Sanremo Racing Srl	March-BMW 832	53	
9th	11	(Italy) Lamberto Leoni	Minardi Team	Minardi-BMW M283	53	
10th	9	(Italy) Roberto Del Castello	Minardi Team	Minardi-BMW M283	53	
11th	19	(Switzerland) Roland Minder	S.A.R.-Swiss Automobil Racing Club	March-BMW 832	51	
12th	21	(Italy) Stefano Livio	Merzario Team Srl	Merzario-BMW M84	49	
DNF	2	(Brazil) Roberto Moreno	Ralt Racing Ltd	Ralt-Honda RH6	43	Wheel bearing
DNF	5	(France) Pierre Petit	Onyx Race Engineering	March-BMW 842	38	Transistor box
DNF	17	(France) Michel Ferté	Martini Racing France/ORECA	Martini-BMW 001	33	Transmission
DNF	33	(France) Pascal Fabre	PMC Motorsport / BS Automotive Ltd	March-BMW 842	33	Engine
DNF	44	(Sweden) Tomas Kaiser	PMC Motorsport / BS Automotive Ltd	March-BMW 842	24	Engine
DNS	22	(Italy) Aldo Bertuzzi	Merzario Team Srl	Merzario-BMW M84		

- Fastest lap: Mike Thackwell, 1:07.38mins. (125.890 mph (202.600 km/h))
