= 1984 BRDC International Trophy =

1984 BRDC International Trophy Grand Prix
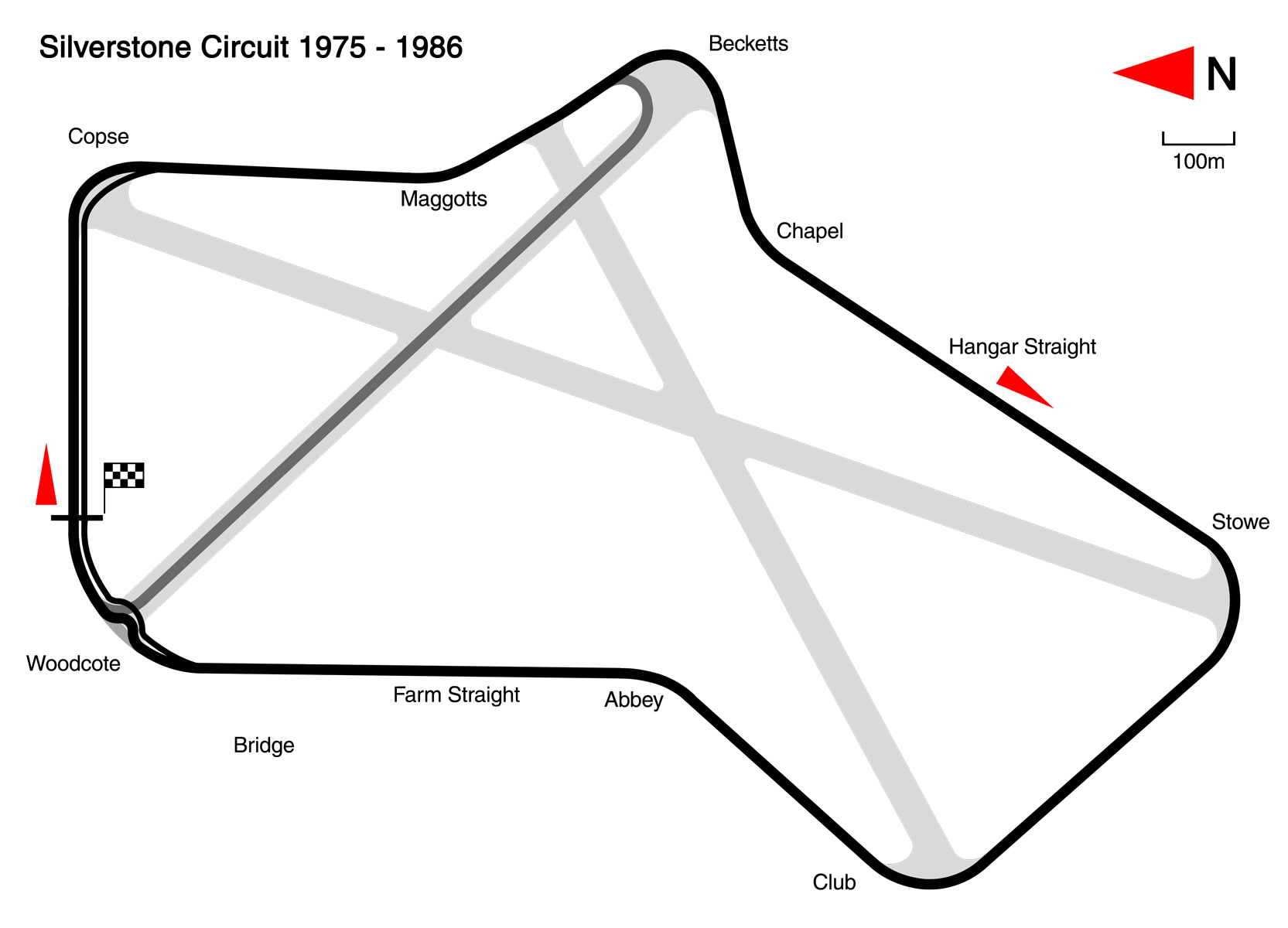

Race details
- Date: 1 April 1984
- Official name: 36th BRDC International Trophy
- Location: Northamptonshire, Great Britain
- Course: Silverstone Circuit
- Course length: 4.719 km (2.932 miles)
- Distance: 47 laps, 221.793 km (137.804 miles)

Pole position
Driver	(Brazil) Roberto Moreno	Ralt-Honda
- Time: 1:14.82

Fastest lap
Driver	(New Zealand) Mike Thackwell	Ralt-Honda
- Time: 1:16.00

Podium
First	(New Zealand) Mike Thackwell	Ralt-Honda
Second	(Brazil) Roberto Moreno	Ralt-Honda
Third	(France) Michel Ferté	Martini-BMW

The 1984 BRDC International Trophy (formally the XXXVI Marlboro / Daily Express International Trophy) was a Formula Two motor race held at Silverstone on 1 April 1984. It was the 36th running of the International Trophy, and the seventh and last under Formula Two regulations. It was also the opening race of the 1984 European Formula Two Championship.

== Report ==
=== Entry ===
A total of 22 F2 cars were entered for the event, and all but the PMC Motorsport entry for Enrique Mansilla arrived for qualifying.

=== Qualifying ===
Roberto Moreno took pole position for Ralt Racing Ltd, in their Ralt-Honda RH6, averaging a speed of 141.094 mph.

=== Race ===
The race was held over 47 laps of the Silverstone Grand Prix circuit. Mike Thackwell took the winner spoils for works Ralt team, driving their Ralt-Honda RH6. Thackwell won in a time of 1hr 01:04.11mins., averaging a speed of 135.376 mph. Over 34 seconds behind was the second works Ralt of Roberto Moreno. The podium was completed by Michel Ferté, in his Martini Racing France/ORECA-entered Martini-BMW 001, albeit one lap adrift.

The lead of the race changed several times between the Ralt teammates with Moreno leading on the last lap when Thackwell attacked him into the Woodcote chicane. Moreno spun over the kerbs allowing Thackwell to take the win while the Brazilian eventually restarted his car and crossed the finish line over 30 seconds later.

== Classification ==
=== Race result ===
Pos	No	Driver	Entrant	Car	Laps	Time/Retired	Grid
1	1	(New Zealand) Mike Thackwell	Ralt Racing Ltd	Ralt-Honda RH6/84	47	1:01:04.11	2
2	2	(Brazil) Roberto Moreno	Ralt Racing Ltd	Ralt-Honda RH6/84	47	+ 34.14	1
3	17	(France) Michel Ferté	Martini Racing France/ORECA	Martini-BMW 001	46	+ 1 Lap	11
4	3	(Belgium) Thierry Tassin	Onyx Race Engineering	March-BMW 842	46	+ 1 Lap	4
5	33	(France) Pascal Fabre	PMC Motorsport / BS Automotive	March-BMW 842	46	+ 1 Lap	8
6	4	(Italy) Emanuele Pirro	Onyx Race Engineering	March-BMW 842	46	+ 1 Lap	3
7	66	(Germany) Christian Danner	PMC Motorsport / BS Automotive	March-BMW 842	46	+ 1 Lap	6
8	18	(Belgium) Didier Theys	Martini Racing France/ORECA	Martini-BMW 001	46	+ 1 Lap	7
9	10	(Italy) Alessandro Nannini	Minardi Team	Minardi-BMW M283	45	+ 2 Laps	12
10	21	(Italy) Stefano Livio	Merzario Team Srl	Merzario-BMW M84	44	+ 3 Laps	19
11	5	(France) Pierre Petit	Onyx Race Engineering	March-BMW 842	43	+ 4 Laps	10
DNF	19	(Switzerland) Rolf Biland	S.A.R.-Swiss Automobil Racing Club / Horag Racing	March-BMW 832	30	Gear linkage	15
DNF	7	(Austria) Jo Gartner	Emco Sports	Spirit-BMW 201B	29	Mechanical	9
DNF	9	(Italy) Roberto Del Castello	Minardi Team	Minardi-BMW M283	29	Accident	17
DNF	20	(Switzerland) Beat Jans	S.A.R.-Swiss Automobil Racing Club / Horag Racing	March-BMW 832	18	Engine	20
DNF	44	(Sweden) Tomas Kaiser	PMC Motorsport / BS Automotive	March-BMW 842	18	Engine	18
DNF	6	(France) Philippe Streiff	AGS Elf (Armagnac Bigorre)	AGS-BMW JH19C	12	Engine	5
DNF	8	(Italy) Lamberto Leoni	Emco Sports	Minardi-BMW M283	4	Accident	13
DNF	22	(Italy) Aldo Bertuzzi	Merzario Team Srl	Merzario-BMW M84	1	Accident damage	21
DNF	11	(Austria) ”Pierre Chauvet”	Emco Sports	Spirit-BMW 201B	0	Accident	16
DNF	15	(Italy) Guido Daccò	Sanremo Racing Srl	March-BMW 832	0	Accident	14

- Fastest lap: Mike Thackwell, 1:16.00secs. (138.87 mph)
