= 1984 Rome Grand Prix =

Race details
- Date: 13 May 1984
- Official name: 28th Rome Grand Prix
- Location: Campagnano di Roma, Lazio, Italy
- Course: ACI Vallelunga Circuit
- Course length: 3.222 km (2.002 miles)
- Distance: 65 laps, 209.430 km (130.130 miles)

Pole position
Driver	(New Zealand) Mike Thackwell	Ralt-Honda
- Time: 1:05.69

Fastest lap
Driver	(New Zealand) Mike Thackwell	Ralt-Honda
- Time: 1:07.38

Podium
First	(New Zealand) Mike Thackwell	Ralt-Honda
Second	(Brazil) Roberto Moreno	Ralt-Honda
Third	(Germany) Christian Danner	March-BMW

The 26th Gran Premio di Roma (Rome Grand Prix), was the fourth round of the 1984 European Championship for F2 Drivers. This was held at the Autodromo Vallelunga Piero Taruffi, to the north of Rome, on 13 May.

== Report ==
=== Entry ===
A total of 25 F2 cars were entered for the event, but come qualifying the field was down to just 17 cars.

=== Qualifying ===
Mike Thackwell took pole position for Ralt Racing Ltd, in their Ralt-Honda RH6, averaging a speed of 108.969 mph.

=== Race ===
The race was held over 65 laps of the Vallelunga circuit. Mike Thackwell took the winner spoils for works Ralt team, driving their Ralt-Honda RH6. The Kiwi won in a time of 1hr 15:59.41mins., averaging a speed of 102.049 mph. Second place went to the other works Ralt of, Roberto Moreno. The podium was completed by the PMC Motorsport / BS Automotive March of Christian Danner.

== Classification ==
=== Race result ===
Pos.	No.	Driver	Entrant	Car - Engine	Time, Laps	Reason Out
1st	1	(New Zealand) Mike Thackwell	Ralt Racing Ltd	Ralt-Honda RH6	1hr 15:59.41	
2nd	2	(Brazil) Roberto Moreno	Ralt Racing Ltd	Ralt-Honda RH6	1hr 16:17.87	
3rd	66	(Germany) Christian Danner	PMC Motorsport / BS Automotive	March-BMW 842	1hr 16:37.94	
4th	17	(France) Michel Ferté	Martini Racing, France/ORECA	Martini-BMW 001	64	
5th	33	(France) Pascal Fabre	PMC Motorsport / BS Automotive	March-BMW 842	64	
6th	18	(Belgium) Didier Theys	Martini Racing, France/ORECA	Martini-BMW 002	64	
7th	44	(Sweden) Tomas Kaiser	PMC Motorsport / BS Automotive Ltd	March-BMW 842	64	
8th	19	(Switzerland) Roland Minder	S.A.R.-Swiss Automobil Racing Club	March-BMW 832	63	
9th	9	(Italy) Roberto Del Castello	Minardi Team	Minardi-BMW M283	62	
10th	3	(Belgium) Thierry Tassin	Onyx Race Engineering	March-BMW 842	62	
11th	15	(Italy) Guido Daccò	Sanremo Racing Srl	March-BMW 832	61	
12th	4	(Italy) Emanuele Pirro	Onyx Race Engineering	March-BMW 842	59	Engine
DNF	10	(Italy) Alessandro Nannini	Minardi Team	Minardi-BMW M283	53	Engine
DNF	6	(France) Philippe Streiff	Elf Gitanes AGS (Armagnac Bigorre)	AGS-BMW JH19C	46	Engine
DNF	5	(France) Pierre Petit	Onyx Race Engineering	March-BMW 842	44	Accident
DNF	11	(Austria) ”Pierre Chauvet”	Emco Sports	Spirit-BMW 201B	16	Oil Leak
DNF	21	(Italy) Stefano Livio	Merzario Team Srl	Merzario-BMW M84	6	Accident

- Fastest lap: Mike Thackwell, 1:07.38secs. (106.236 mph)
