= 1984 European Formula Two Championship =

Motor racing season

1984 European Formula Two season

Seasons
- ← 1983 1985 (F3000) →

The 1984 European Formula Two season was contested over 11 rounds. 13 teams, 32 drivers, 8 chassis and 2 engines competed. Ralt driver Mike Thackwell clinched the championship title.

== Drivers and teams ==
Team	Chassis	Engine	No.	Drivers	Rounds
(United Kingdom) Ralt Racing Ltd.	Ralt RH6	Honda	1	(New Zealand) Mike Thackwell	All
(United Kingdom) Ralt Racing Ltd.	Ralt RH6	Honda	2	(Brazil) Roberto Moreno	All
(United Kingdom) Onyx Racing	March 842	BMW	3	(Belgium) Thierry Tassin	1–8, 10–11
(United Kingdom) Onyx Racing	March 842	BMW	3	(Italy) Beppe Gabbiani	9
(United Kingdom) Onyx Racing	March 842	BMW	4	(Italy) Emanuele Pirro	All
(United Kingdom) Onyx Racing	March 842	BMW	5	(France) Pierre Petit	All
(United Kingdom) Onyx Racing	March 842	BMW	7	(United Kingdom) Derek Bell	11
(France) Team AGS	AGS JH19C; AGS JH19	BMW	6	(France) Philippe Streiff	All
(France) Team AGS	AGS JH19C; AGS JH19	BMW	21	(Italy) Stefano Livio	8
(France) Team AGS	AGS JH19C; AGS JH19	BMW	24	(France) Marc Sourd	5
(Austria) Emco Sports	Spirit 201B; Minardi M283; Spirit 201; March 842	BMW	7	(Austria) Jo Gartner	1–2, 5
(Austria) Emco Sports	Spirit 201B; Minardi M283; Spirit 201; March 842	BMW	7	(Austria) Pierre Chauvet	4
(Austria) Emco Sports	Spirit 201B; Minardi M283; Spirit 201; March 842	BMW	8	(Austria) Pierre Chauvet	5–11
(Austria) Emco Sports	Spirit 201B; Minardi M283; Spirit 201; March 842	BMW	8	(Italy) Lamberto Leoni	1–2
(Austria) Emco Sports	Spirit 201B; Minardi M283; Spirit 201; March 842	BMW	11	(Austria) Pierre Chauvet	1
(Italy) Minardi	Minardi M283	BMW	9	(Italy) Roberto Del Castello	All
(Italy) Minardi	Minardi M283	BMW	10	(Italy) Alessandro Nannini	All
(Italy) Minardi	Minardi M283	BMW	11	(Austria) Pierre Chauvet	2
(Italy) Minardi	Minardi M283	BMW	11	(Italy) Lamberto Leoni	3–5, 7–8, 10–11
(Italy) San Remo Racing	March 832	BMW	15	(Italy) Guido Daccò	All
(France) Martini Racing/ORECA	Martini 001; Martini 002	BMW	17	(France) Michel Ferté	All
(France) Martini Racing/ORECA	Martini 001; Martini 002	BMW	18	(Belgium) Didier Theys	1–5, 7–10
(France) Martini Racing/ORECA	Martini 001; Martini 002	BMW	18	(France) Alain Ferté	6
(France) Martini Racing/ORECA	Martini 001; Martini 002	BMW	34	(France) Hans-Peter Pandur	7
(Switzerland) Horag Racing	March 832; March 842	BMW	19	(Switzerland) Rolf Biland	1–2
(Switzerland) Horag Racing	March 832; March 842	BMW	19	(Switzerland) Roland Minder	3–5, 10–11
(Switzerland) Horag Racing	March 832; March 842	BMW	20	(Switzerland) Beat Jans	1–6
(Switzerland) Horag Racing	March 832; March 842	BMW	24	(Switzerland) Roland Minder	7
(Italy) Team Merzario	Merzario M84	BMW	21	(Italy) Stefano Livio	1–7
(Italy) Team Merzario	Merzario M84	BMW	22	(Italy) Aldo Bertuzzi	1–5
(Italy) Team Merzario	Merzario M84	BMW	22	(Switzerland) Max Busslinger	6–7
(Italy) Team Merzario	Merzario M84	BMW	23	(France) Richard Dallest	2, 5
(United Kingdom) LEP Group	Ralt RT4	BMW	29	(Republic of Ireland) Alo Lawler	4
(West Germany) Manfred Anspann	Maurer MM83	BMW	30	(West Germany) Manfred Anspann	2
(France) Marcel Tarrès	Martini MK43	BMW	30	(France) Marcel Tarrès	6
(West Germany) Peter Stürtz	March 802	BMW	31	(West Germany) Peter Stürtz	2
(Switzerland) Pedrazza Motorsport	March 812; March 802	BMW	31	(Switzerland) Gino Bollinger	7
(Switzerland) Pedrazza Motorsport	March 812; March 802	BMW	32	(Switzerland) Walter Pedrazza	2, 7
(United Kingdom) PMC Motorsport/BS Automotive	March 842	BMW	33	(France) Pascal Fabre	1–9
(United Kingdom) PMC Motorsport/BS Automotive	March 842	BMW	44	(Sweden) Tomas Kaiser	1–5, 8–11
(United Kingdom) PMC Motorsport/BS Automotive	March 842	BMW	44	(Switzerland) Beat Jans	7
(United Kingdom) PMC Motorsport/BS Automotive	March 842	BMW	55	(Argentina) Enrique Mansilla	1–2, 4–5
(United Kingdom) PMC Motorsport/BS Automotive	March 842	BMW	66	(West Germany) Christian Danner	All
(France) Team JPL	AGS JH19	BMW	34	(France) Hans-Peter Pandur	2
(West Germany) Sachs Sporting	March 822	BMW	35	(West Germany) Udo Wagenhäuser	7
(West Germany) Jochen Dauer	March 812	BMW	36	(West Germany) Jochen Dauer	7

== Calendar ==
Round	Circuit	Date	Pole position	Fastest lap	Winning driver	Winning team	Report
1	(United Kingdom) Silverstone Circuit	1 April	(Brazil) Roberto Moreno	(New Zealand) Mike Thackwell	(New Zealand) Mike Thackwell	Ralt Racing	Report
2	(Germany) Hockenheimring	8 April	(France) Michel Ferté	(New Zealand) Mike Thackwell	(Brazil) Roberto Moreno	Ralt Racing	Report
3	(United Kingdom) Thruxton Circuit	23 April	(New Zealand) Mike Thackwell	(New Zealand) Mike Thackwell	(New Zealand) Mike Thackwell	Ralt Racing	Report
4	(Italy) ACI Vallelunga Circuit	13 May	(New Zealand) Mike Thackwell	(New Zealand) Mike Thackwell	(New Zealand) Mike Thackwell	Ralt Racing	Report
5	(Italy) Mugello Circuit	19 May	(Germany) Christian Danner	(New Zealand) Mike Thackwell	(New Zealand) Mike Thackwell	Ralt Racing	Report
6	(France) Circuit de Pau-Ville	11 June	(New Zealand) Mike Thackwell	(New Zealand) Mike Thackwell	(New Zealand) Mike Thackwell	Ralt Racing	Report
7	(Germany) Hockenheimring	24 June	(New Zealand) Mike Thackwell	(New Zealand) Mike Thackwell	(France) Pascal Fabre	PMC Motorsport	Report
8	(Italy) Circuito Internazionale Santa Monica	22 July	(Brazil) Roberto Moreno	(Brazil) Roberto Moreno	(New Zealand) Mike Thackwell	Ralt Racing	Report
9	(Italy) Autodromo di Pergusa	29 July	(New Zealand) Mike Thackwell	(New Zealand) Mike Thackwell	(New Zealand) Mike Thackwell	Ralt Racing	Report
10	(United Kingdom) Donington Park	27 August	(New Zealand) Mike Thackwell	(New Zealand) Mike Thackwell	(Brazil) Roberto Moreno	Ralt Racing	Report
11	(United Kingdom) Brands Hatch	23 September	(Brazil) Roberto Moreno	(Brazil) Roberto Moreno	(France) Philippe Streiff	AGS Elf	Report

=== Notes ===
Race 11 stopped due to heavy rain and restarted.

== Final point standings ==
=== Driver ===
For every race points were awarded: 9 points to the winner, 6 for runner-up, 4 for third place, 3 for fourth place, 2 for fifth place and 1 for sixth place. No additional points were awarded. The best 9 results count. No driver had a point deduction.

Pos	Driver	Team	Chassis	Engine	SIL (United Kingdom)	HOC (West Germany)	THR (United Kingdom)	VLL (Italy)	MUG (Italy)	PAU (France)	HOC (West Germany)	MIS (Italy)	PER (Italy)	DON (United Kingdom)	BRH (United Kingdom)	Pts
1	(New Zealand) Mike Thackwell	Ralt Racing Ltd.	Ralt	Honda	9	6	9	9	9	9	-	9	9	3	-	72
2	(Brazil) Roberto Moreno	Ralt Racing Ltd.	Ralt	Honda	6	9	-	6	-	4	-	-	6	9	4	44
3	(France) Michel Ferté	Martini Racing France/ORECA	Martini	BMW	4	4	-	3	6	-	4	-	2	-	6	29
4	(France) Philippe Streiff	Team AGS	AGS	BMW	-	2	4	-	-	6	-	6	-	-	9	27
5	(West Germany) Christian Danner	PMC Motorsport/BS Automotive	March	BMW	-	1	6	4	4	3	-	1	-	4	-	23
6	(Belgium) Thierry Tassin	Onyx Racing	March	BMW	3	-	2	-	2	-	6	3	-	2	-	18
	(Italy) Emanuele Pirro	Onyx Racing	March	BMW	1	3	3	-	3	-	-	-	1	6	1	18
8	(France) Pascal Fabre	PMC Motorsport/BS Automotive	March	BMW	2	-	-	2	-	-	9	-	-	-	-	13
9	(France) Pierre Petit	Onyx Racing	March	BMW	-	-	-	-	-	1	2	4	3	-	-	10
10	(Italy) Alessandro Nannini	Minardi	Minardi	BMW	-	-	-	-	-	-	3	-	4	-	2	9
11	(Belgium) Didier Theys	Martini Racing France/ORECA	Martini	BMW	-	-	1	1	1	-	-	-	-	-	-	3
	(Sweden) Tomas Kaiser	PMC Motorsport/BS Automotive	March	BMW	-	-	-	-	-	-	-	-	-	-	3	3
13	(France) Alain Ferté	Martini Racing France/ORECA	Martini	BMW	-	-	-	-	-	2	-	-	-	-	-	2
	(Italy) Guido Daccò	San Remo Racing	March	BMW	-	-	-	-	-	-	-	2	-	-	-	2
15	(Italy) Roberto Del Castello	Minardi	Minardi	BMW	-	-	-	-	-	-	1	-	-	-	-	1
	(Austria) Pierre Chauvet	Emco Sports	March	BMW	-	-	-	-	-	-	-	-	-	1	1	

Note:

Race 9 Alessandro Nannini and Michel Ferté were disqualified firstly due to underweight, but later re-instated on appeal.

== Complete overview ==
first column of every race	10	= grid position

second column of every race	10	= race result

R10=retired, but classified NC=not classified R=retired NS=did not start NQ=did not qualify

Pos	Driver	Team	Chassis	Engine	SIL (United Kingdom)		HOC (West Germany)		THR (United Kingdom)		VLL (Italy)		MUG (Italy)		PAU (France)		HOC (West Germany)		MIS (Italy)		PER (Italy)		DON (United Kingdom)		BRH (United Kingdom)	
1	(New Zealand) Mike Thackwell	Ralt Racing Ltd.	Ralt	Honda		1		2	1	1	1	1		1	1	1	1	9		1	1	1	1	4		R
2	(Brazil) Roberto Moreno	Ralt Racing Ltd.	Ralt	Honda	1	2		1		R		2		R		3		R	1	NC		2		1	1	3
3	(France) Michel Ferté	Martini Racing/ORECA	Martini	BMW		3	1	3		R		4		2		R		3		R		5		R		2
4	(France) Philippe Streiff	Team AGS	AGS	BMW		R		5		3		R		11		2		R		2		R		7		1
5	(West Germany) Christian Danner	PMC Motorsport/BS Automotive	March	BMW		7		6		2		3	1	3		4		R		6		R		3		R10
6	(Belgium) Thierry Tassin	Onyx Racing	March	BMW		4		7		5		10		5		R		2		4	-	-		5		7
	(Italy) Emanuele Pirro	Onyx Racing	March	BMW		6		4		4		12		4		R		R		R		6		2		6
8	(France) Pascal Fabre	PMC Motorsport/BS Automotive	March	BMW		5		R		R		5		9		7		1	-	-	-	-	-	-	-	-
9	(France) Pierre Petit	Onyx Racing	March	BMW		11		R		R		R		7		6		5		3		4		R		8
10	(Italy) Alessandro Nannini	Minardi	Minardi	BMW		9		R		7		R		R		R		4		R		3		10		5
11	(Belgium) Didier Theys	Martini Racing/ORECA	Martini	BMW		8		R		6		6		6	-	-	-	-		R12	-	-		R	-	-
	(Sweden) Tomas Kaiser	PMC Motorsport/BS Automotive	March	BMW		R		9		R		7		R	-	-	-	-		8		7		8		4
13	(France) Alain Ferté	Martini Racing/ORECA	Martini	BMW	-	-	-	-	-	-	-	-	-	-		5	-	-	-	-	-	-	-	-	-	-
	(Italy) Guido Daccò	San Remo Racing	March	BMW		R		10		8		11		8		8		11		5		8		9		R
15	(Italy) Roberto Del Castello	Minardi	Minardi	BMW		R		8		10		9		12		R		6		7		R		12		R
	(Austria) Pierre Chauvet	Emco Sports	Minardi	BMW		R																				
	(Austria) Pierre Chauvet	Minardi	Minardi	BMW				R	-	-																
	(Austria) Pierre Chauvet	Emco Sports	Spirit	BMW								R		R												
	(Austria) Pierre Chauvet	Emco Sports	March	BMW												R		7		9	-	-		6		11
-	(Switzerland) Roland Minder	Horag Racing	March	BMW	-	-	-	-		11		8		10	-	-	-	-	-	-	-	-	-	-		12
-	(France) Hans-Peter Pandur	Team JPL	AGS	BMW	-	-		R	-	-	-	-	-	-	-	-										
-	(France) Hans-Peter Pandur	Martini Racing/ORECA	Martini	BMW														8	-	-	-	-	-	-	-	-
-	(Italy) Lamberto Leoni	Emco Sports	Minardi	BMW		R		R		9	-	-	-	-	-	-	-	-								
-	(Italy) Lamberto Leoni	Minardi	Minardi	BMW																10		R9		11	-	-
-	(France) Marcel Tarrès	private entry	Martini	BMW	-	-	-	-	-	-	-	-	-	-		9	-	-	-	-	-	-	-	-	-	-
-	(United Kingdom) Derek Bell	Onyx Racing	March	BMW	-	-	-	-	-	-	-	-	-	-	-	-	-	-	-	-	-	-	-	-		9
-	(Switzerland) Beat Jans	Horag Racing	March	BMW		R		11	-	-	-	-	-	-		R		10	-	-	-	-	-	-	-	-
-	(Switzerland) Max Busslinger	Team Merzario	Merzario	BMW	-	-	-	-	-	-	-	-	-	-		10	-	-	-	-	-	-	-	-	-	-
-	(Italy) Stefano Livio	Team Merzario	Merzario	BMW		10		13		12		R		13		R	-	-								
-	(Italy) Stefano Livio	Team AGS	AGS	BMW																R	-	-	-	-	-	-
-	(Italy) Aldo Bertuzzi	Team Merzario	Merzario	BMW		R		12		NS	-	-	-	-	-	-	-	-	-	-	-	-	-	-	-	-
-	(West Germany) Udo Wagenhäuser	Sachs Sporting	March	BMW	-	-	-	-	-	-	-	-	-	-	-	-		12	-	-	-	-	-	-	-	-
-	(Switzerland) Rolf Biland	Horag Racing	March	BMW		R		R	-	-	-	-	-	-	-	-	-	-	-	-	-	-	-	-	-	-
-	(Austria) Jo Gartner	Emco Sports	Spirit	BMW		R		R	-	-	-	-	-	-	-	-	-	-	-	-	-	-	-	-	-	-
-	(Switzerland) Walter Pedrazza	Pedrazza Motorsport	March	BMW	-	-		NQ	-	-	-	-	-	-	-	-		R	-	-	-	-	-	-	-	-
-	(Switzerland) Gino Bollinger	Pedrazza Motorsport	March	BMW	-	-	-	-	-	-	-	-	-	-	-	-		R	-	-	-	-	-	-	-	-
-	(Italy) Beppe Gabbiani	Onyx Racing	March	BMW	-	-	-	-	-	-	-	-	-	-	-	-	-	-	-	-		R	-	-	-	-
-	(West Germany) Manfred Anspann	private entry	Maurer	BMW	-	-		NQ	-	-	-	-	-	-	-	-	-	-	-	-	-	-	-	-	-	-
