= 1983 European Formula Two Championship =

Motor racing competition

1983 European Formula Two season

Seasons
- ← 1982 1984 →

The 1983 European Formula Two season was contested over 12 rounds. 14 teams, 39 drivers, 10 chassis and 3 engines competed. Ralt driver Jonathan Palmer clinched the championship title.

== Calendar ==
Race No	Circuit	Date	Laps	Distance	Time	Speed	Pole position	Fastest lap	Winner
1	(United Kingdom) Silverstone	20 March	47	4.719=221.793 km	1'08:30.71	194.200 km/h	(United Kingdom) Dave Scott	(West Germany) Stefan Bellof	(Italy) Beppe Gabbiani
2	(United Kingdom) Thruxton	4 April	55	3.598=197.890 km	1'03:54.06	195.828 km/h	(New Zealand) Mike Thackwell	(New Zealand) Mike Thackwell	(Italy) Beppe Gabbiani
3	(West Germany) Hockenheim	10 April	30	6.797=203.910 km	1'02:25.22	196.015 km/h	(Italy) Lamberto Leoni	(United Kingdom) Jonathan Palmer	(United Kingdom) Jonathan Palmer
4	(West Germany) Nürburgring (Eifelrennen)	24 April	9	20.83=187.47 km	0'58:46.44	191.398 km/h	(West Germany) Christian Danner	(West Germany) Christian Danner	(Italy) Beppe Gabbiani
5	(Italy) Vallelunga	8 May	65	3.2=208.0 km	1'14:59.60	166.415 km/h	(Italy) Beppe Gabbiani	(Italy) Beppe Gabbiani	(Italy) Beppe Gabbiani
6	(France) Pau	22 May	73	2.834=206.882 km	1'45:18.65	114.792 km/h	(West Germany) Stefan Bellof	(West Germany) Stefan Bellof	(Austria) Jo Gartner
7	(Spain) Jarama	12 June	65	3.400=221.000 km	1'28:50.80	145.383 km/h	(United Kingdom) Jonathan Palmer	(New Zealand) Mike Thackwell	(New Zealand) Mike Thackwell
8	(United Kingdom) Donington Park	26 June	70	3.150=220.20 km	1'16:39.02	172.602 km/h	(United Kingdom) Jonathan Palmer	(New Zealand) Mike Thackwell	(United Kingdom) Jonathan Palmer
9	(Italy) Misano	24 July	58	3.488=202.304 km	1'09:37.74	174.327 km/h	(France) Philippe Alliot	(France) Philippe Alliot	(United Kingdom) Jonathan Palmer
10	(Italy) Pergusa-Enna	31 July	45	4.95=222.75 km	1'10:11.30	190.416 km/h	(New Zealand) Mike Thackwell	(Italy) Alessandro Nannini	(United Kingdom) Jonathan Palmer
11	(Belgium) Zolder	21 August	46	4.262=196.052 km	1.13:30.27	167.75 km/h	(United Kingdom) Jonathan Palmer	(United Kingdom) Jonathan Palmer	(United Kingdom) Jonathan Palmer
12	(Italy) Mugello	4 September	42	5.245=220.290 km	1'14:58.38	179.466 km/h	(United Kingdom) Jonathan Palmer	(United Kingdom) Jonathan Palmer	(United Kingdom) Jonathan Palmer

Note:

Race 11 originally scheduled over 48 laps, but shortened after a restart due to an accident in the first corner.

== Final point standings ==
=== Drivers' Championship ===
Pos	Driver	SIL (United Kingdom)	THR (United Kingdom)	HOC (West Germany)	NÜR (West Germany)	VAL (Italy)	PAU (France)	JAR (Spain)	DON (United Kingdom)	MIS (Italy)	PER (Italy)	ZOL (Belgium)	MUG (Italy)	Pts
1	(United Kingdom) Jonathan Palmer	Ret	3	1	4	2	3	3	1	1	1	1	1	68
2	(New Zealand) Mike Thackwell	2	2	3	7	3	8	1	2	Ret	3	2	2	51
3	(Italy) Beppe Gabbiani	1	1	Ret	1	1	Ret	7	Ret	Ret	4	Ret	9	39
4	(France) Philippe Streiff	5	8	Ret		5	10	4	3	Ret	2	3	3	25
5	(Germany) Christian Danner	3	13	2	3	10	5	9	5	Ret	7	4	10	21
6	(Austria) Jo Gartner	Ret	Ret	4	Ret	Ret	1	17	Ret	Ret	5	Ret	7	14
7	(Italy) Alessandro Nannini		9	5	2	7	Ret	Ret	Ret	Ret	11	Ret	4	11
8	(Belgium) Thierry Tassin	Ret	4	6	6	4	4							11
9	(Germany) Stefan Bellof	4	Ret	DNS	Ret		DSQ	2	7	DNS	Ret	7		9
10	(United Kingdom) Kenny Acheson	Ret	10	10	9	11	2	Ret	8					6
11	(Italy) Pierluigi Martini									2				6
12	(Italy) Roberto Del Castello	Ret	Ret	Ret		DNS	DNQ	11	11	3	13	10	DNS	4
13	(Italy) Guido Daccò	Ret	Ret	15	Ret	6	Ret	Ret	Ret	4	Ret	Ret	Ret	4
14	(France) Philippe Alliot	Ret	5	8	DNS		Ret	Ret	Ret	Ret	12	5	Ret	4
15	(France) Alain Ferté	Ret	14	12	5	14	DSQ	5	Ret					4
16	(Japan) Kazuyoshi Hoshino								4					3
17	(Italy) Fulvio Ballabio	Ret	Ret	14	Ret	Ret	7	12	DNS	5	9	NC	6	3
18	(United Kingdom) Dave Scott	Ret	Ret	DNS	11	Ret	DNQ	16	6	Ret	Ret	Ret	5	3
19	(Argentina) Enrique Mansilla	Ret	7		DNS	Ret		6	10	Ret	Ret	6	Ret	2
20	(Italy) Lamberto Leoni	6	11	7	Ret	9	Ret							1
21	(Germany) Frank Jelinski	Ret	6		8							Ret		1
22	(Switzerland) Rolf Biland			9	12		6	10				11		1
23	(Switzerland) Fredy Lienhard									6	10			1
24	(France) Michel Ferté						DNQ		12	Ret	6			1
—	(France) Richard Dallest				Ret	Ret	Ret	8		7	Ret		8	0
—	(Argentina) Oscar Larrauri	7	Ret	DNS									Ret	0
—	(France) Pierre Petit	8	12	Ret	10	12	Ret	Ret	Ret	DNS	Ret	8		0
—	(Sweden) Tomas Kaiser	Ret	Ret	Ret	Ret	8	9		Ret			Ret		0
—	(Italy) Enzo Coloni										8			0
—	(Spain) Emilio de Villota	9						13						0
—	(Republic of Ireland) Derek Daly								9					0
—	(Belgium) Didier Theys											9		0
—	(Germany) Bartl Stadler			11										0
—	(Austria) Pierre Chauvet	Ret	Ret	Ret		Ret	Ret	Ret	13	Ret		12	Ret	0
—	(Italy) Aldo Bertuzzi			13	13	13	DNQ	15	Ret	Ret	DNS	13	DNS	0
—	(Belgium) Patrick Nève							14						0
—	(Italy) Paolo Barilla											NC		0
—	(Germany) Peter Stürtz			Ret										0
—	(Switzerland) Beat Jans								Ret					0
Pos	Driver	SIL (United Kingdom)	THR (United Kingdom)	HOC (West Germany)	NÜR (West Germany)	VAL (Italy)	PAU (France)	JAR (Spain)	DON (United Kingdom)	MIS (Italy)	PER (Italy)	ZOL (Belgium)	MUG (Italy)	Pts

- 9 points to the winner, 6 for runner-up, 4 for third place, 3 for fourth place, 2 for fifth place and 1 for sixth place. The best 9 results count.

== Complete overview ==
first column of every race	10	= grid position

second column of every race	10	= race result

R10=retired, but classified NC=not classified R=retired NS=did not start NQ=did not qualify DIS(3)=disqualified after finishing in third position

Pos	Driver	Team	Chassis	Engine	SIL (United Kingdom)		THR (United Kingdom)		HOC (West Germany)		NÜR (West Germany)		VLL (Italy)		PAU (France)		JAR (Spain)		DON (United Kingdom)		MIS (Italy)		PER (Italy)		ZOL (Belgium)		MUG (Italy)	
1	(United Kingdom) Jonathan Palmer	Ralt Racing Ltd.	Ralt	Honda		R		3		1		4		2		3	1	3	1	1		1		1	1	1	1	1
2	(New Zealand) Mike Thackwell	Ralt Racing Ltd.	Ralt	Honda		2	1	2		3		7		3		8		1		2		R	1	3		2		2
3	(Italy) Beppe Gabbiani	Onyx Racing	March	BMW		1		1		R		1	1	1		R		7		R		R		4		R		9
4	(France) Philippe Streiff	Écurie Armagnac Bigorre	AGS	BMW		5		8		R	-	-		5		10		4		3		R		2		3		3
5	(West Germany) Christian Danner	Onyx Racing	March	BMW		3		13		2	1	3		R10		5		9		5		R		7		4		10
6	(Austria) Jo Gartner	Emco Sports	Spirit	BMW		R		R		4		R		R	1	1		17		R		R		5		R		7
7	(Belgium) Thierry Tassin	Onyx Racing	March	BMW		R		4		6		6		4		4	-	-	-	-	-	-	-	-	-	-	-	-
	(Italy) Alessandro Nannini	Minardi	Minardi	BMW	-	-		9		5		2		7		R		R		R		R		R11		R		4
9	(West Germany) Stefan Bellof	Maurer Motorsport	Maurer	BMW		R4		R		NS		R	-	-		DIS(3)		2		7		NS		R		7	-	-
10	(United Kingdom) Kenny Acheson	Maurer Motorsport	Maurer	BMW		R		10		10		9		11		2		R		8	-	-	-	-	-	-	-	-
	(Italy) Pierluigi Martini	Minardi	Minardi	BMW	-	-	-	-	-	-	-	-	-	-	-	-	-	-	-	-		2	-	-	-	-	-	-
12	(France) Alain Ferté	Maurer Motorsport	Maurer	BMW		R		R14		12		5		14		DIS(1)		5		R	-	-	-	-	-	-	-	-
	(Italy) Roberto Del Castello	Mint Engineering	March	BMW		R		R		R	-	-		NS		NQ		11										
	(Italy) Roberto Del Castello	Gresham Racing	March	BMW																11		3		13		10		NS
	(Italy) Guido Daccò	Team Merzario	Merzario	BMW		R		R		15																		
	(Italy) Guido Daccò	San Remo Racing	Lola	BMW								R		6		R												
	(Italy) Guido Daccò	San Remo Racing	March	BMW														R		R		4		R		R		R
	(France) Philippe Alliot	BMW France	Martini	BMW		R		5		8		NS	-	-		R		R		R	1	R		R12		5		R
16	(Japan) Kazuyoshi Hoshino	James Gresham Racing	March	BMW	-	-	-	-	-	-	-	-	-	-	-	-	-	-		4	-	-	-	-	-	-	-	-
	(United Kingdom) Dave Scott	Mint Engineering	March	BMW	1	R		R		NS		11		R		NQ		R16										
	(United Kingdom) Dave Scott	Onyx Racing	March	BMW																6		R		R		R		5
	(Italy) Fulvio Ballabio	Team Merzario	Merzario	BMW		R		R		14		R																
	(Italy) Fulvio Ballabio	Écurie Armagnac Bigorre	AGS	BMW										R		7		12		NS		5		9		NC		6
19	(Argentina) Enrique Mansilla	James Gresham Racing	March	BMW		R		7	-	-		NS		R	-	-		6		10		R		R		6		R
20	(Italy) Lamberto Leoni	Horag Hotz Racing	March	BMW		6																						
20	(Italy) Lamberto Leoni	Gresham Racing	March	BMW				11	1	7		R		9		R	-	-	-	-	-	-	-	-	-	-	-	-
	(West Germany) Frank Jelinski	Bertam Schäfer Racing	Maurer	BMW		R		6	-	-		8	-	-	-	-	-	-	-	-	-	-	-	-				
	(West Germany) Frank Jelinski	Maurer Motorsport	Maurer	BMW																						R	-	-
	(Switzerland) Rolf Biland	Horag Hotz Racing	March	BMW	-	-	-	-		9		12	-	-		6		10	-	-	-	-	-	-		11	-	-
	(Switzerland) Fredy Lienhard	Horag Hotz Racing	March	BMW	-	-	-	-	-	-	-	-	-	-	-	-	-	-	-	-		6		10	-	-	-	-
	(France) Michel Ferté	BMW France	Martini	BMW	-	-	-	-	-	-	-	-	-	-		NQ	-	-		12		R		6	-	-	-	-
-	(France) Richard Dallest	Team Merzario	Merzario	BMW	-	-	-	-	-	-		R		R		R		8	-	-		7		R	-	-		8
-	(Argentina) Oscar Larrauri	Minardi	Minardi	BMW		7		R		NS	-	-	-	-	-	-	-	-	-	-	-	-	-	-	-	-		R
-	(France) Pierre Petit	Maurer Motorsport	Maurer	BMW		8		12		R		10		12		R		R		R		NS		R		8	-	-
-	(Sweden) Tomas Kaiser	Bertram Schäfer Racing	Maurer	BMW		R		R		R		R		8		9	-	-		R	-	-	-	-		R	-	-
-	(Italy) Enzo Coloni	Minardi	Minardi	BMW	-	-	-	-	-	-	-	-	-	-	-	-	-	-	-	-	-	-		8	-	-	-	-
-	(Spain) Emilio de Villota	Gresham Racing	March	BMW		9	-	-	-	-	-	-	-	-	-	-												
-	(Spain) Emilio de Villota	Minardi	Minardi	BMW														R13	-	-	-	-	-	-	-	-	-	-
-	(Republic of Ireland) Derek Daly	McMahon Racing	March	Hart	-	-	-	-	-	-	-	-	-	-	-	-	-	-		9	-	-	-	-	-	-	-	-
-	(Belgium) Didier Theys	BMW France	Martini	BMW	-	-	-	-	-	-	-	-	-	-	-	-	-	-	-	-	-	-	-	-		9	-	-
-	(West Germany) Bartl Stadler	Bertram Schäfer Racing	Maurer	BMW	-	-	-	-		11	-	-	-	-	-	-	-	-	-	-	-	-	-	-	-	-	-	-
-	(Austria) Pierre Chauvet	Emco Sports	Spirit	BMW		R		R		R	-	-		R		R		R		13		R	-	-		12		R
-	(Italy) Aldo Bertuzzi	San Remo Racing	Minardi	BMW	-	-	-	-		13																		
-	(Italy) Aldo Bertuzzi	San Remo Racing	Toleman	BMW								13																
-	(Italy) Aldo Bertuzzi	San Remo Racing	March	BMW										13		NQ		15		R		R		NS		13		
-	(Italy) Aldo Bertuzzi	Minardi	Minardi	BMW																								NS
-	(Belgium) Patrick Nève	Onyx Racing	March	BMW	-	-	-	-	-	-	-	-	-	-	-	-		14	-	-	-	-	-	-	-	-	-	-
-	(Italy) Paolo Barilla	Minardi	Minardi	BMW	-	-	-	-	-	-	-	-	-	-	-	-	-	-	-	-	-	-	-	-		NC	-	-
-	(West Germany) Peter Stürtz	Peter Stürtz	March	BMW	-	-	-	-		R	-	-	-	-	-	-	-	-	-	-	-	-	-	-	-	-	-	-
-	(Switzerland) Beat Jans	Horag Hotz Racing	March	BMW	-	-	-	-	-	-	-	-	-	-	-	-	-	-		R	-	-	-	-	-	-	-	-
