= 1986 International Formula 3000 Championship =

Motor racing competition

1986 FIA International Formula 3000 Championship

Seasons
- ← 1985 1987 →

The 1986 International Formula 3000 Championship was contested over an eleven-round series. A total of 28 different teams, 71 different drivers, 7 different chassis and 2 different engines competed.

== Drivers and teams ==
Team	Chassis	Engine	No.	Drivers	Rounds
(United Kingdom) BS Automotive	Lola T86/50	Cosworth	1	(Sweden) Tomas Kaiser	All
(United Kingdom) BS Automotive	Lola T86/50	Cosworth	2	(United States) Ken Johnson	1-5
(United Kingdom) BS Automotive	Lola T86/50	Cosworth	2	(Italy) Claudio Langes	6-11
(United Kingdom) BS Automotive	Lola T86/50	Cosworth	3	(United Kingdom) Andrew Gilbert-Scott	1-10
(United Kingdom) BS Automotive	Lola T86/50	Cosworth	3	(Italy) Gabriele Tarquini	11
(United Kingdom) Ralt Racing Ltd	Ralt RT20	Honda	4	(Denmark) John Nielsen	All
(United Kingdom) Ralt Racing Ltd	Ralt RT20	Honda	5	(Japan) Satoru Nakajima	1-2, 5-9
(United Kingdom) Ralt Racing Ltd	Ralt RT20	Honda	5	(New Zealand) Mike Thackwell	3, 11
(United Kingdom) Ralt Racing Ltd	Ralt RT20	Honda	5	(United Kingdom) James Weaver	4, 10
(United Kingdom) Onyx Race Engineering	March 86B	Cosworth	6	(Italy) Emanuele Pirro	All
(United Kingdom) Onyx Race Engineering	March 86B	Cosworth	7	(Canada) John Jones	All
(United Kingdom) Onyx Race Engineering	March 86B	Cosworth	8	(United States) Cary Bren	1-4
(United Kingdom) Onyx Race Engineering	March 86B	Cosworth	8	(South Africa) Wayne Taylor	7
(United Kingdom) Onyx Race Engineering	March 86B	Cosworth	8	(United Kingdom) Russell Spence	8-11
(France) Oreca Motorsport	March 86B	Cosworth	9	(France) Philippe Alliot	1-6
(France) Oreca Motorsport	March 86B	Cosworth	9	(France) Pierre-Henri Raphanel	7-11
(France) Oreca Motorsport	March 86B	Cosworth	10	(France) Michel Ferté	All
(France) Oreca Motorsport	March 86B	Cosworth	11	(France) Pierre-Henri Raphanel	1-6
(France) Oreca Motorsport	March 86B	Cosworth	11	(France) Cathy Muller	8, 11
(France) Oreca Motorsport	March 86B	Cosworth	11	(France) Alain Ferté	9
(France) Oreca Motorsport	March 86B	Cosworth	11	(France) Yannick Dalmas	10
(Italy) ITI 3000	March 86B	Cosworth	12	(Italy) Lamberto Leoni	1-8
(Italy) ITI 3000	March 86B	Cosworth	12	(Italy) Beppe Gabbiani	10
(Italy) ITI 3000	March 86B	Cosworth	12	(Switzerland) Marzio Romano	11
(Italy) ITI 3000	March 86B	Cosworth	14	(Italy) Franco Scapini	1-5
(Italy) ITI 3000	March 85B	Cosworth	14	(Italy) Aldo Bertuzzi	10-11
(Italy) ITI 3000	March 86B	Cosworth	15	(France) Alain Ferté	1-7
(Italy) ITI 3000	March 86B	Cosworth	15	(Italy) Guido Daccò	8-11
(United Kingdom) Bromley Motorsport with Rial	Ralt RT20	Cosworth	16	(Germany) Volker Weidler	1-4, 6-8
(United Kingdom) Bromley Motorsport	Ralt RT20	Cosworth	16	(Brazil) Roberto Moreno	9
(Italy) San Remo Racing	March 86B	Cosworth	17	(Italy) Claudio Antonioli	1-4
(Italy) San Remo Racing	March 86B	Cosworth	17	(Switzerland) Franco Forini	5-9
(Italy) San Remo Racing	March 86B	Cosworth	17	(Italy) Alessandro Santin	10-11
(Italy) San Remo Racing	March 86B	Cosworth	18	(Italy) Guido Dacco	1
(Italy) San Remo Racing	March 86B	Cosworth	18	(Italy) Gianfranco Tacchino	9
(Italy) San Remo Racing	March 85B	Cosworth	18	(Italy) Gianfranco Tacchino	2-7
(Italy) San Remo Racing	March 85B	Cosworth	18	(Italy) Oscar Pedersoli	8
(Italy) San Remo Racing	March 85B	Cosworth	18	(Italy) Paolo Barilla	10
(Italy) San Remo Racing	March 85B	Cosworth	18	(United Kingdom) Andrew Gilbert-Scott	11
(United Kingdom) Lola Motorsport	Lola T86/50	Cosworth	19	(France) Pascal Fabre	1-9
(United Kingdom) Lola Motorsport	Lola T86/50	Cosworth	19	(Spain) Adrián Campos	10-11
(United Kingdom) Lola Motorsport	Lola T86/50	Cosworth	20	(Italy) Alessandro Santin	1-4, 6
(United Kingdom) Lola Motorsport	Lola T86/50	Cosworth	20	(Italy) Marco Lucchinelli	5
(United Kingdom) Lola Motorsport	Lola T86/50	Cosworth	20	(Italy) Franco Scapini	7-8
(United Kingdom) Lola Motorsport	Lola T86/50	Cosworth	20	(Chile) Eliseo Salazar	9-11
(United Kingdom) Eddie Jordan Racing	March 86B	Cosworth	21	(United Kingdom) Russell Spence	1-7
(United Kingdom) Eddie Jordan Racing	March 86B	Cosworth	21	(United Kingdom) Kenny Acheson	8
(United Kingdom) Eddie Jordan Racing	March 86B	Cosworth	21	(Republic of Ireland) Tommy Byrne	9
(United Kingdom) Eddie Jordan Racing	March 86B	Cosworth	21	(Netherlands) Jan Lammers	10
(United Kingdom) Eddie Jordan Racing	March 86B	Cosworth	21	(Switzerland) Bernard Santal	11
(United Kingdom) Eddie Jordan Racing	March 86B	Cosworth	22	(Belgium) Thierry Tassin	1
(United Kingdom) Eddie Jordan Racing	March 86B	Cosworth	22	(Austria) Pierre Chauvet	2-6, 8, 10-11
(United Kingdom) Eddie Jordan Racing	March 86B	Cosworth	22	(Italy) Alessandro Santin	7
(United Kingdom) Eddie Jordan Racing	March 86B	Cosworth	22	(United States) Ross Cheever	9
(United Kingdom) Colin Bennet Racing	March 86B	Cosworth	23	(United States) Jeff MacPherson	1-7
(United Kingdom) Colin Bennet Racing	March 86B	Cosworth	23	(United Kingdom) Tim Davies	9
(United Kingdom) Colin Bennet Racing	March 86B	Cosworth	23	(Republic of Ireland) Marc Galvin	10
(United Kingdom) Colin Bennet Racing	March 86B	Cosworth	23	(Netherlands) Cor Euser	11
(Switzerland) Horag Hotz Racing	Lola T86/50	Cosworth	24	(New Zealand) Mike Thackwell	1
(Switzerland) Horag Hotz Racing	Lola T86/50	Cosworth	24	(Italy) Guido Daccò	2
(Switzerland) Horag Hotz Racing	Lola T86/50	Cosworth	24	(France) Cathy Muller	3-7
(Switzerland) Horag Hotz Racing	Lola T86/50	Cosworth	24	(Switzerland) Bernard Santal	8
(Switzerland) Horag Hotz Racing	Lola T86/50	Cosworth	24	(Switzerland) Gregor Foitek	11
(United Kingdom) West Surrey Racing	March 86B	Cosworth	26	(Brazil) Maurício Gugelmin	All
(Italy) Arno International	March 85B	Cosworth	27	(Switzerland) Mario Hytten	1-3
(Italy) Arno International	Ralt RT20	Cosworth	27	(Switzerland) Mario Hytten	7-9, 11
(Germany) Bertram Schäfer Racing	March 85B	Cosworth	28	(Germany) Altfrid Heger	1-3, 5
(Germany) Bertram Schäfer Racing	March 86B	Cosworth	28	(Germany) Altfrid Heger	4
(Germany) Bertram Schäfer Racing	Ralt RT20	Cosworth	28	(Germany) Altfrid Heger	6-11
(Italy) Équipe Dollop	March 85B	Cosworth	30	(Switzerland) Jean-Pierre Frey	1-7, 9
(Italy) Équipe Dollop	March 86B	Cosworth	30	(Switzerland) Jean-Pierre Frey	8, 10-11
(Italy) Équipe Dollop	March 85B	Cosworth	31	(France) Marcel Tarrés	3
(Italy) Équipe Dollop	March 85B	Cosworth	31	(Italy) Aldo Bertuzzi	5-6
(Italy) Équipe Dollop	March 85B	Cosworth	50	(France) Marcel Tarrés	9
(United Kingdom) Roni Motorsport	March 85B	Cosworth	32	(Sweden) Steven Andskär	1, 4, 6, 8, 10
(United Kingdom) GEM Motorsport	Lola T86/50	Cosworth	33	(United Kingdom) Gary Evans	All
(Italy) Coloni Racing	March 85B	Cosworth	34	(Italy) Gabriele Tarquini	2-10
(Italy) Coloni Racing	March 85B	Cosworth	35	(Switzerland) Franco Forini	2
(Italy) Coloni Racing	March 85B	Cosworth	35	(Italy) Guido Daccò	5-6
(Italy) Coloni Racing	March 85B	Cosworth	35	(Italy) Nicola Larini	7
(Italy) Coloni Racing	March 85B	Cosworth	35	(Italy) Alessandro Santin	8-9
(Italy) Coloni Racing	March 85B	Cosworth	35	(Italy) Nicola Tesini	10-11
(Italy) Genoa Racing	March 86B	Cosworth	36	(Italy) Ivan Capelli	All
(United Kingdom) RAM Motorsport	RAM 04	Cosworth	39	(United Kingdom) James Weaver	1
(United Kingdom) RAM Motorsport	RAM 04	Cosworth	39	(Chile) Eliseo Salazar	2-7
(Italy) Pavesi Racing	Ralt RT20	Cosworth	40	(Spain) Luis Pérez-Sala	All
(Italy) Pavesi Racing	Ralt RB20	Cosworth	41	(Italy) Pierluigi Martini	1-4
(Italy) Pavesi Racing	Ralt RT20	Cosworth	41	(Italy) Pierluigi Martini	5-11
(United Kingdom) Peter Gethin Racing	March 86B	Cosworth	42	(Spain) Adrián Campos	1-7
(United Kingdom) Peter Gethin Racing	March 86B	Cosworth	42	(Spain) Alfonso de Vinuesa	11
(United Kingdom) Peter Gethin Racing	March 86B	Cosworth	43	(United Kingdom) Dave Scott	9
(United Kingdom) Peter Gethin Racing	March 86B	Cosworth	43	(France) Cathy Muller	10
(Italy) EuroVenturini	March 86B	Cosworth	44	(Finland) Jari Nurminen	All
(United Kingdom) Roger Cowman Racing	March 85B	Cosworth	45	(Netherlands) Cor Euser	1
(Switzerland) Formula Team Ltd	Lola T86/50	Cosworth	46	(France) Dominique Delestre	1
(Switzerland) Formula Team Ltd	Lola T86/50	Cosworth	46	(Italy) Guido Daccò	4
(Switzerland) Formula Team Ltd	Lola T86/50	Cosworth	46	(Italy) Alessandro Santin	5
(Switzerland) Formula Team Ltd	Lola T86/50	Cosworth	46	(France) Olivier Grouillard	6, 8-9, 11
(Switzerland) Formula Team Ltd	Lola T86/50	Cosworth	46	(New Zealand) Mike Thackwell	7
(Switzerland) Formula Team Ltd	Lola T86/50	Cosworth	46	(Switzerland) Benoît Morand	10
(Italy) Minardi Team Adolfo	Minardi M3085	Cosworth	47	(Italy) Aldo Bertuzzi	2-3
(Italy) Minardi Team Adolfo	Minardi M3085	Cosworth	47	(Italy) Bruno Corradi	8
(France) Équipe Danielson	AGS JH20B	Cosworth	48	(France) Richard Dallest	3-5, 10
(France) Équipe Danielson	AGS JH20B	Cosworth	49	(France) Alain Ferté	10-11
(Italy) Giorgio Cajelli Racing	March 85B	Cosworth	51	(Italy) Guido Daccò	7
Écurie Monaco	Monte Carlo MC001	Cosworth	51	(Italy) Fulvio Ballabio	5

== Calendar ==
Round	Race	Circuit	Date	Laps	Distance	Time	Speed	Pole position	Fastest lap	Winner
1	Daily Express International Trophy	(United Kingdom) Silverstone Circuit	13 April	12+12	4.719=113.256 km	0'35:33.97	193.062 km/h	(France) Pascal Fabre	(France) Pascal Fabre	(France) Pascal Fabre
2	Gran Premio di Roma	(Italy) ACI Vallelunga Circuit	4 May	64	3.2=204.8 km	1'14:24.22	165.153 km/h	(Italy) Ivan Capelli	(Italy) Ivan Capelli	(Italy) Ivan Capelli
3	Pau Grand Prix	(France) Pau Grand Prix	19 May	73	2.76=201.48 km	1'31:17.92	132.409 km/h	(Italy) Emanuele Pirro	(Italy) Emanuele Pirro	(New Zealand) Mike Thackwell
4	Grand Prix de Belgique Formule 3000	(Belgium) Circuit de Spa-Francorchamps	24 May	28	6.949=194.572 km	1'02:03.562	187.872 km/h	(France) Philippe Alliot	(Denmark) John Nielsen	(France) Philippe Alliot
5	Trofeo Elio de Angelis	(Italy) Autodromo Enzo e Dino Ferrari	8 June	39	5.04=196.56 km	1.05:48.56	179.209 km/h	(Italy) Ivan Capelli	(France) Michel Ferté	(Italy) Pierluigi Martini
6	Euro Mugello	(Italy) Mugello Circuit	29 June	38	5.245=199.31 km	1'10:48.43	168.890 km/h	(Italy) Pierluigi Martini	(Italy) Pierluigi Martini	(Italy) Pierluigi Martini
7	Gran Premio del Mediterraneo	(Italy) Autodromo di Pergusa	20 July	40	4.95=198.0 km	1'01:42.72	192.507 km/h	(Italy) Ivan Capelli	(New Zealand) Mike Thackwell	(Spain) Luis Pérez-Sala
8	Österreichring F3000	(Austria) Österreichring	16 August	34	5.942=202.028 km	0'58:47.530	206.178 km/h	(Denmark) John Nielsen	(Denmark) John Nielsen	(Italy) Ivan Capelli
9	Halfords Birmingham Superprix	(United Kingdom) Birmingham	25 August	24	3.975=95.4 km	0'42:24.40	134.979 km/h	(Italy) Pierluigi Martini	(Chile) Eliseo Salazar	(Spain) Luis Pérez-Sala
10	Le Mans F3000	(France) Bugatti Circuit	28 September	47	4.24=199.28 km	1'30:36.4	170.141 km/h	(Italy) Emanuele Pirro	(Italy) Emanuele Pirro	(Italy) Emanuele Pirro
11	Jarama F3000	(Spain) Circuito del Jarama	5 October	42+16	3.312=192.096 km	1'18:05.49	147.593 km/h	(Italy) Emanuele Pirro	(France) Michel Ferté	(Italy) Pierluigi Martini

Note:

Race 1 stopped and restarted and stopped again earlier due to an accident involving Dominique Delestre and Thierry Tassin. Only half-points were awarded.

Race 9 stopped earlier due to an accident involving Andrew Gilbert-Scott and Alain Ferté in heavy rain. Only half-points were awarded.

Race 11 stopped and restarted. Pierluigi Martini was disqualified from victory as his mechanics had worked on his car between starts. He was later reinstated as the winner.

== Championship standings ==
Scoring system

Points are awarded to the top 6 classified finishers.

Position	**1st**	**2nd**	**3rd**	**4th**	**5th**	**6th**
Points	9	6	4	3	2	1

=== Final point standings ===
Pos	Driver	SIL^{‡} (United Kingdom)	VLL (Italy)	PAU (France)	SPA (Belgium)	IMO (Italy)	MUG (Italy)	PER (Italy)	ÖST (Austria)	BIR^{‡} (United Kingdom)	BUG (France)	JAR (Spain)	Pts
1	(Italy) Ivan Capelli	Ret	**1**	Ret	3	**2**	3	**Ret**	1	Ret	4	4	38
2	(Italy) Pierluigi Martini	19	10	DNQ	11	1	**1**	2	7	**2**	Ret	1	36
3	(Italy) Emanuele Pirro	2	3	**2**	19	Ret	6	13	Ret	Ret	**1**	**2**	29
4	(Spain) Luis Pérez-Sala	12	Ret	5	4	5	DNQ	1	5	1	5	8	24.5
5	(France) Michel Ferté	9	12	3	5	12	2	12	Ret	3	2	3	24
6	(Denmark) John Nielsen	3	Ret	Ret	2	Ret	Ret	6	**2**	11	7	5	17
7	(France) Pascal Fabre	**1**	2	Ret	9	10	Ret	3	Ret	5			15.5
8	(New Zealand) Mike Thackwell	4		1				9				Ret	10.5
9	(France) Philippe Alliot	Ret	8	Ret	**1**	13	Ret						9
10	(Italy) Gabriele Tarquini		13	Ret	8	4	Ret	Ret	3	13	Ret	14	7
11	(Japan) Satoru Nakajima	Ret	5			8	5	10	4	8			7
12	(France) Pierre-Henri Raphanel	Ret	14	Ret	6	15	8	7	12	Ret	3	15	5
13	(France) Alain Ferté	13	Ret	Ret	14	3	7	18		Ret	Ret	Ret	4
14	(Sweden) Tomas Kaiser	5	18	Ret	12	Ret	11	4	Ret	9	13	10	4
15	(Brazil) Maurício Gugelmin	14	4	DNS	7	Ret	DNQ	Ret	8	14	9	6	4
16	(France) Olivier Grouillard						4		6	Ret		9	4
17	(France) Richard Dallest			4	13	DNQ					Ret		3
18	(Italy) Claudio Langes						9	5	Ret	Ret	6	12	3
19	(Chile) Eliseo Salazar		11	DNQ	21	Ret	DNQ	DNQ		4	12	Ret	1.5
20	(Italy) Alessandro Santin	6	6	Ret	10	7	Ret	8	17	12	Ret	Ret	1.5
21	(Canada) John Jones	20	DNQ	6	22	DNQ	12	11	14	7	15	11	1
22	(Switzerland) Franco Forini		DNQ			6	14	DNQ	DNQ	DNQ			1
23	(United Kingdom) Russell Spence	18	DNQ	Ret	15	Ret	DNQ	Ret	11	6	10	Ret	0.5
24	(West Germany) Volker Weidler	10	7	Ret	DNQ		16	DNQ	9				0
25	(Italy) Lamberto Leoni	11	Ret	7	Ret	9	DNQ	15	DNS				0
26	(United Kingdom) Gary Evans	7	16	DNQ	20	DNQ	10	10	10	16	DNQ	Ret	0
27	(Spain) Adrián Campos	16	DNQ	Ret	DNQ	Ret	DNS	DNQ			Ret	7	0
28	(United States) Jeff MacPherson	8	DNQ	DNQ	DNQ	Ret	Ret	14					0
29	(United Kingdom) James Weaver	DNQ			Ret						8		0
30	(United States) Ken Johnson	Ret	9	DNQ	18	DNQ							0
31	(Brazil) Roberto Moreno									10			0
32	(Italy) Marco Lucchinelli					11							0
33	(Netherlands) Jan Lammers										11		0
34	(West Germany) Altfrid Heger	23	DNQ	DNQ	DNS	Ret	13	DNQ	DNQ	Ret	Ret	13	0
35	(Italy) Franco Scapini	17	Ret	DNQ	DNQ	DNQ		Ret	13				0
36	(Italy) Guido Daccò	DNQ	15		DNQ	14	DNQ	16	16	DNQ	16	DNQ	0
37	(Austria) Pierre Chauvet		Ret	DNQ	Ret	Ret	18		DNQ		14	Ret	0
38	(United Kingdom) Andrew Gilbert-Scott	Ret	Ret	DNQ	16	DNQ	15	17	DNQ	17	Ret	Ret	0
39	(Switzerland) Mario Hytten	15	Ret	DNS				DNQ	Ret	DNQ		DNQ	0
40	(Finland) Jari Nurminen	Ret	DNQ	DNQ	DNQ	DNQ	DNQ	DNQ	15	DNQ	DNQ	DNQ	0
41	(Republic of Ireland) Tommy Byrne									15			0
42	(France) Cathy Muller			DNQ	17	Ret	17	DNQ	DNQ		17	DNQ	0
43	(Italy) Claudio Antonioli	DNQ	17	DNQ	DNQ								0
44	(Italy) Gianfranco Tacchino		DNQ	DNQ	DNQ	DNQ	Ret	19		DNQ			0
45	(United States) Cary Bren	21	DNQ	DNQ	DNQ								0
46	(Belgium) Thierry Tassin	22											0
	(France) Marcel Tarrés			DNQ						Ret	DNQ		
	(Switzerland) Bernard Santal								Ret			DNQ	
	(Netherlands) Cor Euser	DNQ										Ret	
	(France) Dominique Delestre	Ret											
	(Italy) Nicola Larini							Ret					
	(United Kingdom) Kenny Acheson								Ret				
	(United Kingdom) Tim Davies									Ret			
	(France) Yannick Dalmas										Ret		
	(Spain) Alfonso de Vinuesa											Ret	
	(Switzerland) Gregor Foitek											Ret	
	(Switzerland) Jean-Pierre Frey	DNQ	DNQ	DNQ	DNQ	DNQ	DNQ	DNQ	DNQ	DNQ	DNQ	DNQ	
	(Italy) Aldo Bertuzzi		DNQ	DNQ		DNQ	DNQ				DNQ	DNQ	
	(Sweden) Steven Andskär	DNQ			DNQ		DNQ		DNQ		DNQ		
	(Italy) Nicola Tesini										DNQ	DNQ	
	(Italy) Fulvio Ballabio					DNQ							
	(South Africa) Wayne Taylor							DNQ					
	(Italy) Oscar Pedersoli								DNQ				
	(Italy) Bruno Corradi								DNQ				
	(United Kingdom) Dave Scott									DNQ			
	(United States) Ross Cheever									DNQ			
	(Italy) Beppe Gabbiani										DNQ		
	(Switzerland) Benoît Morand										DNQ		
	(Republic of Ireland) Marc Galvin										DNQ		
	(Italy) Paolo Barilla										DNQ		
	(Switzerland) Marzio Romano											DNQ	
Pos	Driver	SIL (United Kingdom)	VAL (Italy)	PAU (France)	SPA (Belgium)	IMO (Italy)	MUG (Italy)	PER (Italy)	ÖST (Austria)	BIR (United Kingdom)	BUG (France)	JAR (Spain)	Pts

Colour	Result
Gold	Winner
Silver	Second place
Bronze	Third place
Green	Points classification
Blue	Non-points classification
Blue	Non-classified finish (NC)
Purple	Retired, not classified (Ret)
Red	Did not qualify (DNQ)
Red	Did not pre-qualify (DNPQ)
Black	Disqualified (DSQ)
White	Did not start (DNS)
White	Withdrew (WD)
White	Race cancelled (C)
Blank	Did not practice (DNP)
Blank	Did not arrive (DNA)
Blank	Excluded (EX)

=== Notes ===
- Results in **bold** indicate **pole position**.
- Results in italics indicate fastest lap.
