= Pascal Fabre =

French racing driver (born 1960)

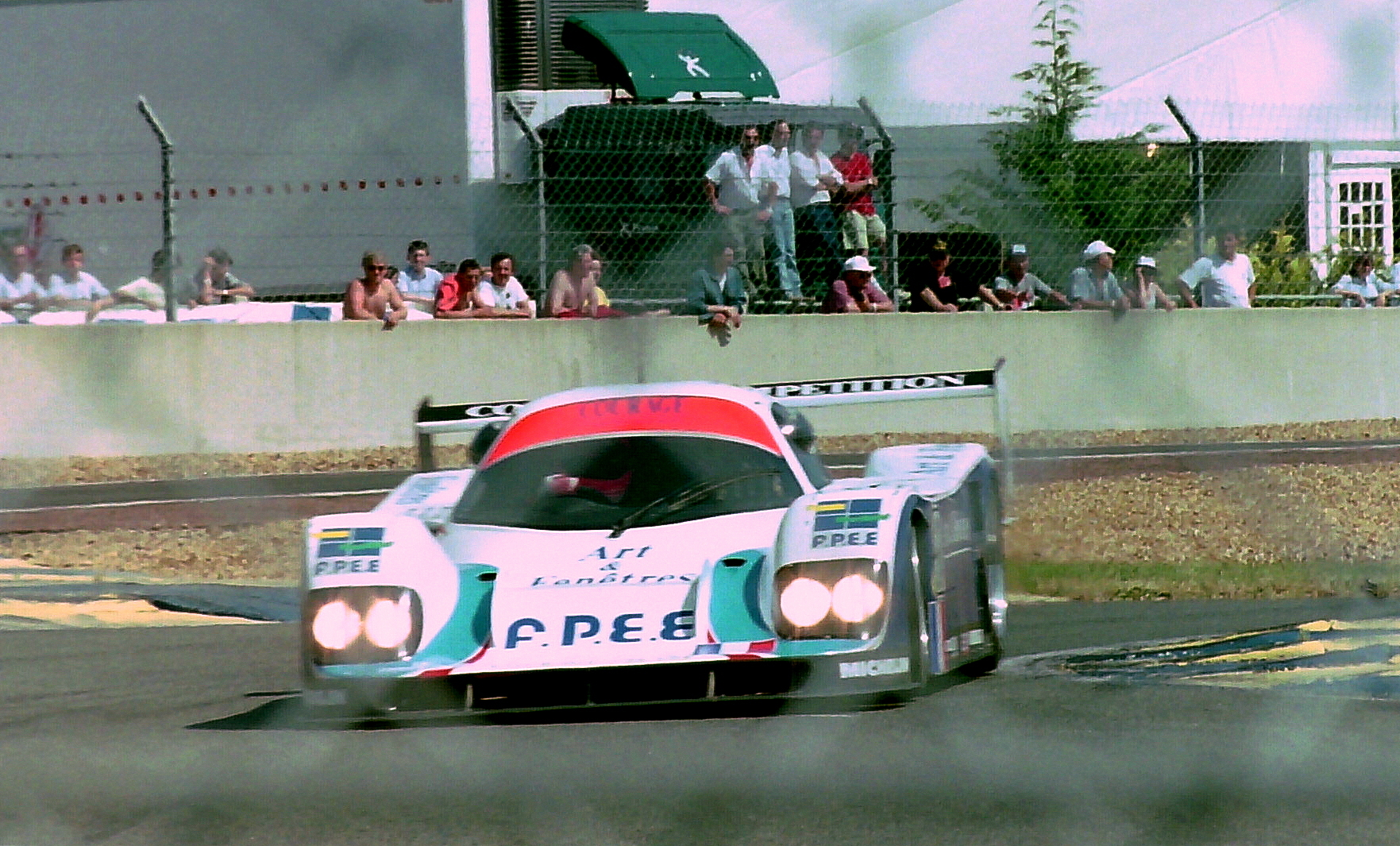
- Born: 9 January 1960 (age 66); Lyon, France

Formula One World Championship career
- Nationality: (France) French
- Active years: 1987
- Team: AGS
- Entries: 14 (11 starts)
- Championships: 0
- Wins: 0
- Podiums: 0
- Career points: 0
- Pole positions: 0
- Fastest laps: 0
- First entry: 1987 Brazilian Grand Prix
- Last entry: 1987 Mexican Grand Prix

Pascal Fabre (French pronunciation: [paskal fabʁ]; born 9 January 1960) is a former racing driver from France. He participated in 14 Formula One Grands Prix with the uncompetitive AGS team, debuting on 12 April 1987. He scored no championship points and was replaced before the end of the season by Roberto Moreno. His best finish was ninth place in both the French and British Grands Prix.

Fabre began racing at Winfield Racing School and in 1978 he graduated as the top student with the Volant Elf Competition Scholarship. Fabre later raced for Courage Compétition from 1988 to 1990 in the World Sportscar Championship and made short-term appearances for various other sports car teams throughout the 1990s.

== Racing record ==
=== Complete European Formula Two Championship results ===
(key) (Races in bold indicate pole position; races in italics indicate fastest lap)

Year	Entrant	Chassis	Engine	1	2	3	4	5	6	7	8	9	10	11	12	13	Pos.	Pts
1982	Ecurie Motul GPA Nogaro	AGS JH18	BMW	SIL; Ret	HOC; 12	THR; 13	NÜR; 16	MUG; 16	VLL; 3	PAU; DNQ	SPA; 19	HOC; Ret	DON; Ret	MAN; 6	PER; 8	MIS; 9	15th	5
1984	PMC Automotive / BS Automotive	March 842	BMW	SIL; 5	HOC; Ret	THR; Ret	VLL; 5	MUG; 9	PAU; 7	HOC; 1	MIS	PER	DON	BRH			8th	13

=== 24 Hours of Le Mans results ===
Year	Team	Co-Drivers	Car	Class	Laps	Pos.	Class Pos.
1983	(France) WM Secateva	(France) Roger Dorchy (France) Alain Courdec	WM P83-Peugeot	C	278	16th	12th
1989	(France) Courage Compétition	(France) Jean-Louis Bousquet (Japan) Jiro Yoneyama	Cougar C22LM-Porsche	C1	110	DNF	DNF
1990	(France) Courage Compétition	(France) Michel Trollé (France) Lionel Robert	Cougar C24S-Porsche	C1	347	7th	7th
1991	(France) Automobiles Louis Descartes (France) Racing Organization Corse (ROC)	(Switzerland) Bernard Thuner	ROC 002-Ford Cosworth	C1	38	DNF	DNF
1993	(France) Courage Compétition	(United Kingdom) Derek Bell (France) Lionel Robert	Courage C30LM-Porsche	C2	347	10th	5th
1994	(France) Courage Compétition	(France) Lionel Robert (France) Pierre-Henri Raphanel	Courage C32LM-Porsche	LMP1 /C90	107	DNF	DNF
1996	(Japan) Team Menicon SARD Co. Ltd.	(France) Alain Ferté (Italy) Mauro Martini	SARD MC8-R	GT1	256	24th	15th
1998	(France) Pilot Racing	(France) Michel Ferté (France) François Migault	Ferrari 333 SP	LMP1	203	DNF	DNF
2001	(France) ROC Auto	(Spain) Jordi Gené (Switzerland) Jean-Denis Délétraz	Reynard 2KQ-LM-Volkswagen	LMP675	284	5th	**1st**

=== Complete International Formula 3000 results ===
(key) (Races in bold indicate pole position; races in italics indicate fastest lap.)

Year	Entrant	Chassis	Engine	1	2	3	4	5	6	7	8	9	10	11	12	Pos.	Pts
1985	Équipe Oreca	March 85B	Cosworth	SIL	THR	EST	NÜR	VAL	PAU	SPA	DIJ	PER	ÖST	ZAN	DON; 10	24th	0
1986	Lola Motorsport	Lola T86/50	Cosworth	**SIL**; 1	VAL; 2	PAU; Ret	SPA; 9	IMO; 10	MUG; Ret	PER; 3	ÖST; Ret	BIR; 5	BUG	JAR		7th	15.5

=== Complete Formula One results ===
(key)

Year	Entrant	Chassis	Engine	1	2	3	4	5	6	7	8	9	10	11	12	13	14	15	16	WDC	Points
1987	Team El Charro AGS	AGS JH22	Cosworth V8	BRA; 12	SMR; 13	BEL; 10	MON; 13	DET; 12	FRA; 9	GBR; 9	GER; Ret	HUN; 13	AUT; NC	ITA; DNQ	POR; DNQ	ESP; Ret	MEX; DNQ	JPN	AUS	NC	0
