= Michel Ferté =

French racing driver (1958–2023)

- Born: 8 December 1958; Falaise, Calvados, France
- Died: 4 January 2023 (aged 64); Le Mans, France
- Occupation: Racing driver

Michel Ferté (8 December 1958 – 4 January 2023) was a French professional racing driver. He was the younger brother of Alain Ferté, who is also a professional racing driver.

Ferté competed five seasons in Formula 3000 from 1985 to 1989, and won the 1994 4 Hours of Spa, the 1994 4 Hours of Dijon, and the 1995 4 Hours of Anderstorp. Ferté died on 4 January 2023, at the age of 64.

== Career ==
=== 24 Hours of Le Mans results ===
Year	Team	Co-Drivers	Car	Class	Laps	Pos.	Class Pos.
1983	Ford France	(France) Alain Ferté (France) Jean Rondeau	Rondeau M482-Ford	C	90	DNF	DNF
1984	(United States) Henn's T-Bird Swap Shop	(Germany) Edgar Dören (United States) Preston Henn	Porsche 962	IMSA; GTP	247	DNF	DNF
1988	(France) Primagaz Competition	(France) Pierre-Henri Raphanel	Cougar C20B-Porsche	C1	120	DNF	DNF
1989	(United Kingdom) Silk Cut Jaguar (United Kingdom) Tom Walkinshaw Racing	(France) Alain Ferté (Chile) Eliseo Salazar	Jaguar XJR-9LM	C1	368	8th	7th
1990	(United Kingdom) Silk Cut Jaguar (United Kingdom) Tom Walkinshaw Racing	(United States) Davy Jones (Chile) Eliseo Salazar	Jaguar XJR-12	C1	282	DNF	DNF
1991	(United Kingdom) Silk Cut Jaguar (United Kingdom) Tom Walkinshaw Racing	(United States) Davy Jones (Brazil) Raul Boesel	Jaguar XJR-12	C2	360	**2nd**	**2nd**
1994	(France) Jacadi Racing	(France) Olivier Grouillard (Belgium) Michel Neugarten	Venturi 600LM	GT1	107	DNF	DNF
1995	(France) Pilot Aldix Racing	(France) Olivier Thévenin (Spain) Carlos Palau	Ferrari F40 LM	GT1	270	12th	6th
1996	(France) Pilot Pen Racing	(France) Olivier Thévenin (France) Nicolas Leboissetier	Ferrari F40 LM	GT1	93	DNF	DNF
1997	(France) Pilot Racing	(Spain) Adrián Campos (United States) Charlie Nearburg	Ferrari 333 SP	LMP	18	DNF	DNF
1998	(France) Pilot Racing	(France) Pascal Fabre (France) François Migault	Ferrari 333 SP	LMP1	203	DNF	DNF
1999	(France) Pescarolo Promotion Racing Team	(France) Henri Pescarolo (France) Patrice Gay	Courage C50-Porsche	LMP	327	9th	8th
2003	(France) XL Racing	(France) Ange Barde (France) Gaël Lesoudier	Ferrari 550-GTS Maranello	GTS	227	DNF	DNF

=== European Formula Two Championship results ===
(key) (Races in bold indicate pole position; races in italics indicate fastest lap)

Year	Entrant	Chassis	Engine	1	2	3	4	5	6	7	8	9	10	11	12	Pos.	Pts
1983	Marlboro Team Martini	Martini 001	BMW	SIL	THR	HOC	NÜR	VAL	PAU; DNQ	JAR	DON; 12	MIS; Ret	PER; 6	ZOL	MUG	20th	1
1984	Marlboro Racing France	Martini 002	BMW	SIL; 3	**HOC**; 3	THR; Ret	VAL; 4	MUG; 2	PAU; Ret	HOC; 3	MIS; Ret	PER; 5	DON; Ret	BRH; 2		3rd	29

=== Complete International Formula 3000 results ===
(key) (Races in bold indicate pole position; races in italics indicate fastest lap.)

Year	Entrant	Chassis	Engine	1	2	3	4	5	6	7	8	9	10	11	12	Pos.	Pts
1985	Marlboro Racing France	March 85B	Cosworth	**SIL**; 3	THR; 3	EST; 2	NÜR; C	VAL; Ret	PAU; Ret	**SPA**; Ret	DIJ; 8	PER; Ret	ÖST; Ret	ZAN; Ret	DON; 4	5th	17
1986	Marlboro Racing France	March 86B	Cosworth	SIL; 9	VAL; 12	PAU; 3	SPA; 5	IMO; 12	MUG; 2	PER; 12	ÖST; Ret	BIR; 3	BUG; 2	JAR; 3		5th	24
1987	BS Automotive	Lola T86/50	Cosworth	SIL; Ret												14th	5
1987	BS Automotive	Lola T87/50	Cosworth		VAL; 10	SPA; 14	PAU; 3	DON; 6	PER							14th	5
1987	Genoa Racing	March 87B	Cosworth							BRH; DNQ	BIR; 11	IMO; DNQ	BUG	JAR		14th	5
1988	Sport Auto Racing	Lola T88/50	Cosworth	JER	VAL	PAU	SIL	MNZ	PER; 13	BRH; Ret	BIR; 6	BUG; 10	ZOL; 12	DIJ; 15		20th	1
1989	Cobra International	Reynard 89D	Cosworth	SIL	VAL	PAU	JER	PER; Ret	BRH	BIR	SPA	BUG	DIJ			NC	0

Sporting positions
Preceded by Pierre Petit	French Formula Three; Champion; 1983	Succeeded by Olivier Grouillard
