= Tomas Kaiser =

Swedish former racing driver from Saelen (born 1956)

Tomas Kaiser (born 2 December 1956) is a Swedish former racing driver from Sälen.

Kaiser began his career racing Formula Fords. In 1979, he raced in the European Formula Three Championship and British Formula Three Championship. In 1980, he finished fourth in the Swedish Formula Three Championship and competed in one race each in the British, European, and German F3 series. In 1981, he finished third in Swedish F3 and maintained a similar part-time schedule in the other series. In 1982, he made two starts in the European Formula Two Championship. In 1983, he drove in eight of the 12 European F2 races but was only running at the finish in two of them. In 1984, he competed in nine European F2 races and finished 11th in points, finishing in the points in fourth in the season finale at Brands Hatch. In 1985 European F2 gave way to International Formula 3000 and Kaiser competed in seven races and finished fourth at Thruxton Circuit, good enough for 14th in points. In 1986, he competed in all 11 races for BS Automotive and finished 14th in points with a best finish of fourth at Pergusa. 1987 was his last season of professional racing as he competed in a full season of F3000 but failed to qualify for three races and didn't finish in the points in any races.

Alongside his driving career, Kaiser created Hello Sweden, a support and development program for emergent Swedish racing drivers. Prominent drivers such as Thomas Danielsson, Kenny Bräck, Björn Wirdheim and Sebastian Hohenthal were some of the recipients of this support.

In 1986 and early 1987, Kaiser had negotiations with Brabham and Arrows to become a Formula 1 driver in the 1987 season. He was very close to signing for Brabham to race alongside Riccardo Patrese but he was denied a Superlicence.

Kaiser was mentored by James Hunt throughout his Formula 3000 career.

As of 2022, Kaiser still acts as a tutor, manager and consultant for young racing drivers.

== Racing record ==
=== Complete European Formula Two Championship results ===
(key) (Races in bold indicate pole position; races in italics indicate fastest lap)

Year	Entrant	Chassis	Engine	1	2	3	4	5	6	7	8	9	10	11	12	13	Pos.	Pts
1982	Strandel Motorsport	Toleman TG280	Hart	SIL	HOC	THR; NC	NÜR	MUG; DNS	VAL; DNQ	PAU	SPA						NC	0
1982	Strandel Motorsport	March 812	BMW									HOC; 15	DON; Ret	MAN; Ret	PER	MIS	NC	0
1983	Bertram Schäfer Racing	Maurer MM82	BMW	SIL; Ret	THR; Ret	HOC; Ret	NÜR; Ret	VAL; 8	PAU; 9	JAR	DON; Ret	MIS	PER	ZOL; Ret	MUG		NC	0
1984	BS Automotive	March 842	BMW	SIL; Ret	HOC; 9	THR; Ret	VAL; 7	MUG; Ret	PAU	HOC	MIS; 8	PER; 7	DON; 8	BRH; 4			11th	3

=== Complete International Formula 3000 results ===
(key) (Races in bold indicate pole position; races in italics indicate fastest lap.)

Year	Entrant	Chassis	Engine	1	2	3	4	5	6	7	8	9	10	11	12	Pos.	Pts
1985	BS Automotive	March 85B	Cosworth	SIL; 10	THR; 4	EST; DSQ	NÜR; C	VAL; 8	PAU	SPA	DIJ	PER; Ret	ÖST; 11	ZAN; 9	DON; 8	14th	3
1986	BS Automotive	Lola T86/50	Cosworth	SIL; 5	VAL; 18	PAU; Ret	SPA; 12	IMO; Ret	MUG; 11	PER; 4	ÖST; Ret	BIR; 9	BUG; 13	JAR; 10		14th	4
1987	Eddie Jordan Racing	March 87B	Cosworth	SIL; 13	VAL; 9	SPA; DNQ	PAU; Ret	DON; Ret	PER; DNQ							NC	0
1987	BS Automotive	Lola T86/50	Cosworth							BRH; 22	BIR; DNQ	IMO; Ret				NC	0
1987	BS Automotive	Lola T87/50	Cosworth										BUG; 16	JAR; 12		NC	0
