= Lamberto Leoni =

Italian racing driver (born 1953)

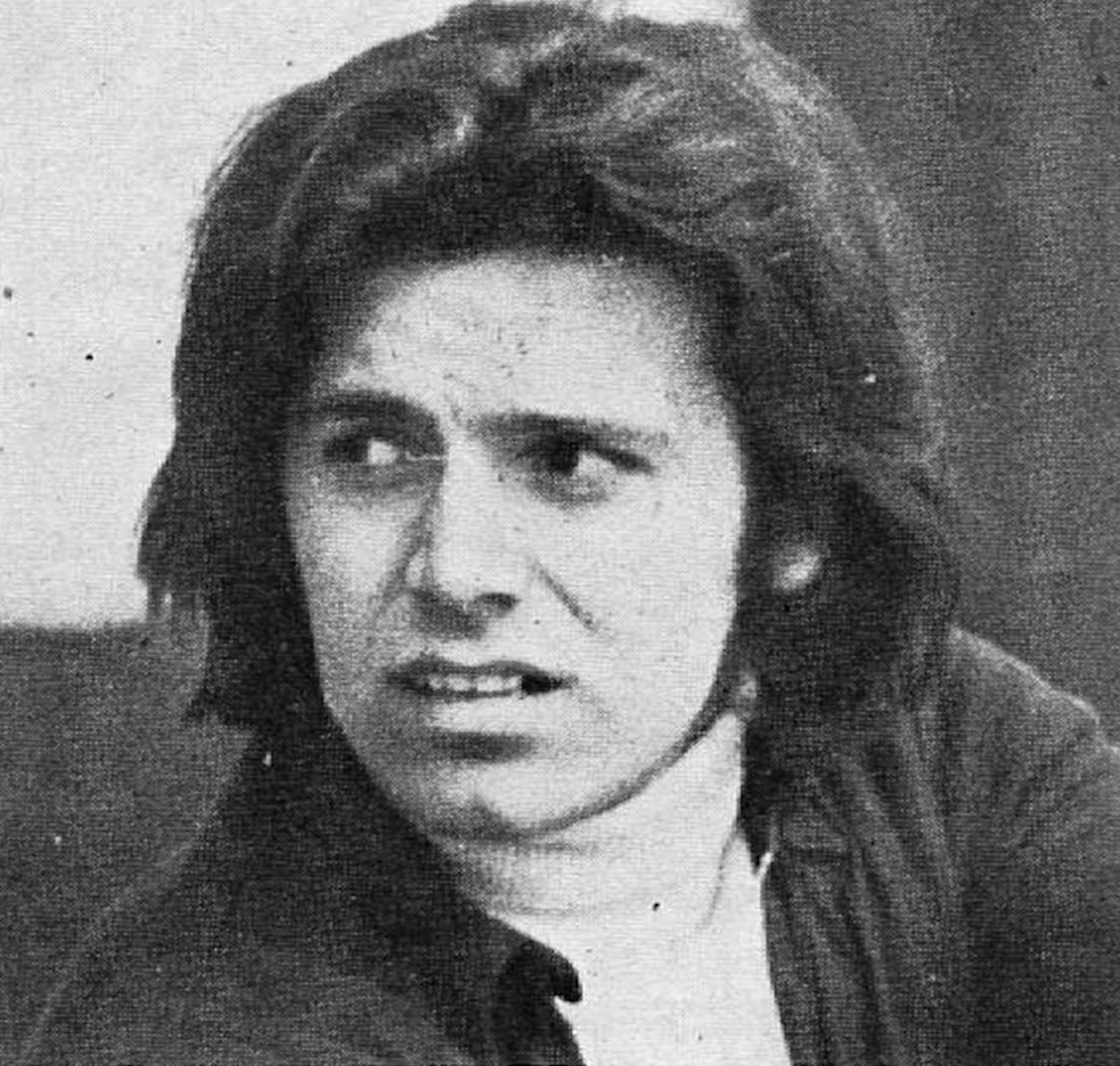
- Leoni in 1974
- Born: 24 May 1953 (age 73); Argenta, Italy

Formula One World Championship career
- Nationality: (Italy) Italian
- Active years: 1977–1978
- Team(s): Surtees, Ensign
- Entries: 5 (1 start)
- Championships: 0
- Wins: 0
- Podiums: 0
- Career points: 0
- Pole positions: 0
- Fastest laps: 0
- First entry: 1977 Italian Grand Prix
- Last entry: 1978 United States Grand Prix West

Lamberto Leoni (born 24 May 1953) is a former racing driver from Italy. He participated in five Formula One World Championship Grands Prix, failing to qualify for three of them. He scored no championship points.

== Career ==
After racing in Italian Formula 3, Leoni graduated to European Formula 2 in 1976. He had a promising start, finishing third in his first race with Massimo Ciccozzi's team Scuderia del Passatore at Autódromo do Estoril. He then raced for Giancarlo Minardi's Scuderia Everest, with mixed results. His best result came the following season, when he won at Misano with a car fielded by Scuderia Trivellato.

In 1977, Leoni made his Formula One debut with Surtees at the 1977 Italian Grand Prix, replacing Vern Schuppan, but failed to qualify. The following year, he joined Morris Nunn's Ensign. Leoni qualified for the opening event, the 1978 Argentine Grand Prix, but was forced to retire the car after 28 laps because of an engine failure. At the following race in Brazil, Leoni once again managed to qualify but was prevented from starting the race after his transmission broke down during the formation lap. After failing to qualify the car in the following two races in South Africa and the United States, Leoni departed from the team and was replaced by Jacky Ickx.

Leoni returned to Formula 2 and then Formula 3000. In 1987, he formed his own First Racing team. Following a few moderately successful seasons, with wins for drivers Marco Apicella and Pierluigi Martini, in 1989, Leoni made an abortive attempt to enter Formula One with a car designed by Richard Divila and Gabriele Tarquini at the wheel. The car, however, was poorly assembled and although Leoni commissioned a second chassis, he eventually elected to end the team experience in Formula One. The second chassis was then purchased by Ernesto Vita for his unsuccessful Life outfit.

Leoni subsequently managed the career of Apicella, who ended up winning the Super Formula Championship in 1994 and have an outing in Formula One with Jordan Grand Prix in 1993.

In the early 1990s, Leoni resumed his racing career by becoming involved in powerboat racing. He was able to win several races and narrowly missed the 1993 World Championship.

== Racing record ==
=== Complete European Formula Two Championship results ===
(key) (Races in bold indicate pole position; races in italics indicate fastest lap)

Year	Entrant	Chassis	Engine	1	2	3	4	5	6	7	8	9	10	11	12	13	14	Pos.	Pts
1975	Scuderia del Passatore	March 752	BMW	EST; 3	THR; Ret	HOC; NC	NÜR; 14	PAU	HOC; Ret	SAL	ROU	MUG; Ret	PER; Ret	SIL	ZOL	NOG	VAL	18th	4
1977	Scuderia Everest	Ralt RT1	Ferrari	SIL	THR; Ret	HOC; DNQ	NÜR	VAL; Ret	PAU; DNQ	MUG; 7	ROU; DNQ	NOG; 9						11th	9
1977	Trivellato Racing Team	Chevron B40	BMW										PER; 8	MIS; 1	EST; 9	DON		11th	9
1979	Lamberto Leoni	March 782	Amaroli	SIL	HOC	THR	NÜR	VAL; DNQ	MUG; Ret	PAU	HOC	ZAN	PER	MIS	DON			NC	0
1982	Team Merzario	Merzario 282	BMW	SIL	HOC	THR	NÜR	MUG	VAL	PAU	SPA	HOC	DON	MAN	PER	MIS; 14		NC	0
1983	Schweizer Automobil Rennsport	March 832	BMW	SIL; 6														20th	1
1983	James Gresham Racing	March 832	BMW		THR; 11	**HOC**; 7	NÜR; Ret	VAL; 9	PAU; Ret	JAR	DON	MIS	PER	ZOL	MUG			20th	1
1984	Emco Sports	Minardi M283	BMW	SIL; Ret	HOC; Ret													NC	0
1984	Minardi Team	Minardi M283	BMW			THR; 9	VAL	MUG	PAU	HOC	MIS; 10	PER; 9	DON; 11	BRH				NC	0

=== Complete International Formula 3000 results ===
(key) (Races in bold indicate pole position; races in italics indicate fastest lap.)

Year	Entrant	Chassis	Engine	1	2	3	4	5	6	7	8	9	10	11	12	Pos.	Pts
1985	PMC Motorsport	Williams FW08C	Cosworth	SIL; NC	THR; 16	EST	NÜR	VAL; Ret	PAU; 3	SPA; Ret	DIJ; 15					11th	8
1985	Corbari Italia	March 85B	Cosworth									PER; Ret	ÖST; 3	ZAN; 11	DON; 11	11th	8
1986	ITI 3000	March 86B	Cosworth	SIL; 11	VAL; Ret	PAU; 7	SPA; Ret	IMO; 9	MUG; DNQ	PER; 15	ÖST; DNS	BIR	BUG	JAR		NC	0
1987	First Racing	March 87B	Cosworth	SIL; 8	VAL; 8	SPA; 13	PAU; 6	DON; Ret	PER; 5	BRH; 11	BIR; Ret	IMO; 4				9th	12
1987	First Racing	March 87B	Judd										BUG; 4	JAR; 4		9th	12

=== Complete Formula One World Championship results ===
(key)

Year	Entrant	Chassis	Engine	1	2	3	4	5	6	7	8	9	10	11	12	13	14	15	16	17	WDC	Pts
1977	Team Surtees	Surtees TS19	Ford Cosworth DFV 3.0 V8	ARG	BRA	RSA	USW	ESP	MON	BEL	SWE	FRA	GBR	GER	AUT	NED	ITA; DNQ	USA	CAN	JPN	NC	0
1978	Team Tissot Ensign	Ensign N177	Ford Cosworth DFV 3.0 V8	ARG; Ret	BRA; DNS	RSA; DNQ	USW; DNQ	MON	BEL	ESP	SWE	FRA	GBR	GER	AUT	NED	ITA	USA	CAN		NC	0

=== 24 Hours of Le Mans results ===
Year	Team	Co-Drivers	Car	Class	Laps	Pos.	Class Pos.
1988	(Japan) Italya Sport Team Le Mans	(Japan) Akio Morimoto (Sweden) Anders Olofsson	March 88S-Nissan	C1	69	DNF	DNF

== Sources ==
- Profile at www.grandprix.com
