= Spirit 201 =

Spirit 201 Spirit 201C
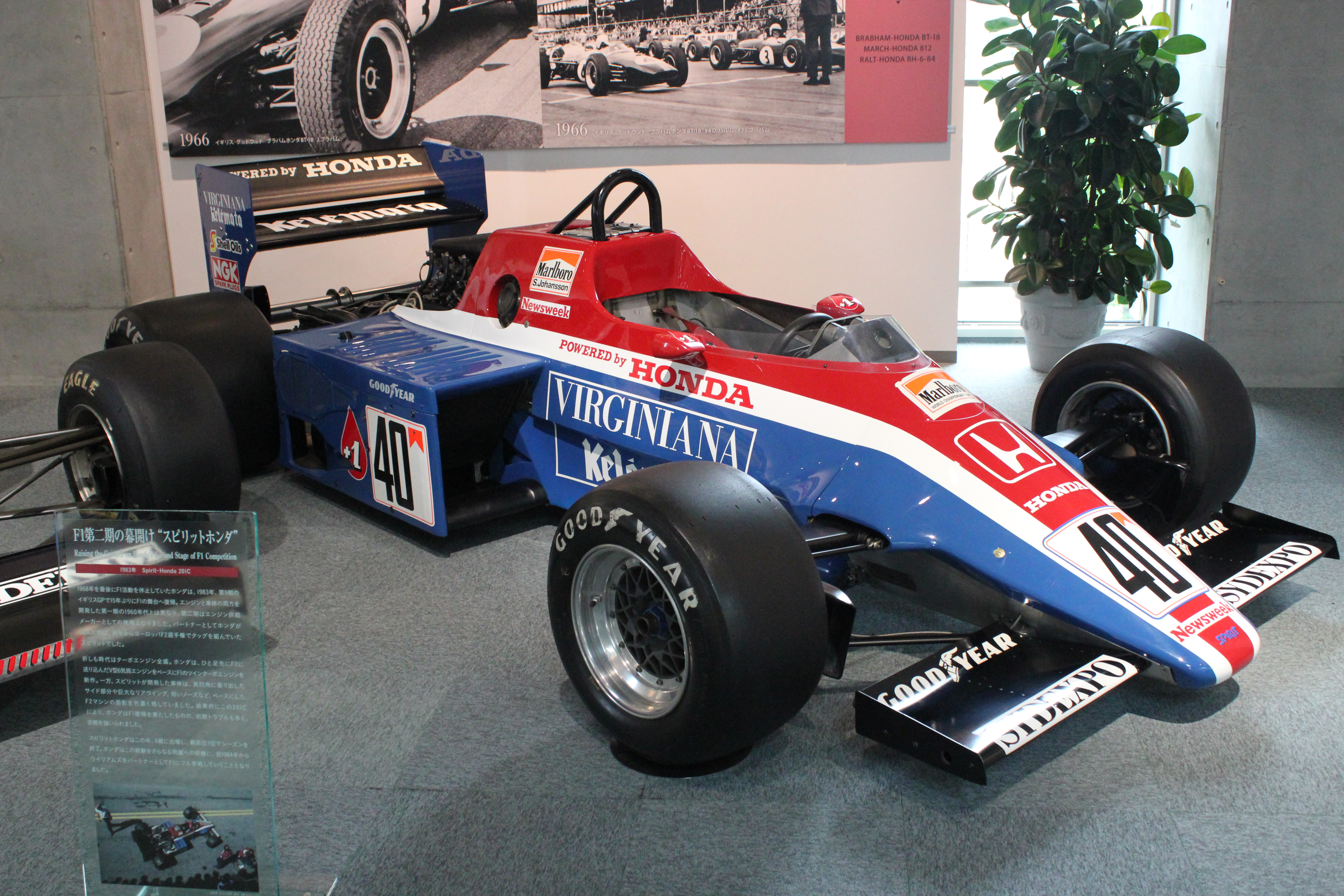
- Category: Formula One; Formula Two
- Constructor: Spirit Racing
- Designers: John Baldwin; Gordon Coppuck
- Successor: Spirit 101

Technical specifications
- Chassis: Aluminium monocoque
- Suspension (front): Double wishbones
- Suspension (rear): Double wishbones
- Axle track: Front: 1,753 mm (69.0 in); Rear: 1,651 mm (65.0 in)
- Wheelbase: 2,654 mm (104.5 in)
- Engine: Honda RA163E, 1,477 cc (90.1 cu in), 80° V6, turbo, mid-engine, longitudinally mounted
- Transmission: Hewland FGB 5-speed manual
- Weight: 580 kg (1,280 lb)
- Fuel: Shell
- Tyres: Goodyear

Competition history
- Notable entrants: Spirit Racing
- Notable drivers: 40. (Sweden) Stefan Johansson
- Debut: 1983 British Grand Prix
Races	Wins	Poles	F/Laps
6	0	0	0
- Constructors' Championships: 0
- Drivers' Championships: 0
- Unless otherwise stated, all data refer to Formula One World Championship Grands Prix only.

The Spirit 201 was a Formula One and Formula Two racing car designed by John Baldwin and Spirit Racing co-founder Gordon Coppuck. It was raced in European Formula Two from 1982 to 1984 and in Formula One in 1983.

In Formula Two racing, the car was powered by a 2-litre naturally aspirated engine.

In Formula One, it was powered by the 1.5 litre turbocharged Honda engine. The 201 made its Formula One debut in the hands of Swedish driver Stefan Johansson at the non-championship 1983 Race of Champions at Brands Hatch. There Johansson qualified the car 12th (out of 13, Jean-Louis Schlesser's RAM March did not record a time but still started). He retired with a blown engine after 4 laps, having already moved up to 10th with laps as quick as the leaders, including what was reportedly the most powerful car of 1983, the 650 bhp (485 kW; 659 PS) Ferrari 126C2B driven by René Arnoux. Johansson retired just as television commentator Murray Walker was ironically telling viewers that the team and the Honda engine had done thousands of miles of trouble free testing.

For the team's World Championship debut at the 1983 British Grand Prix at Silverstone, a modified 201C design was produced, which Johansson qualified in a respectable 15th. But engine problems on race morning forced him to drive the 201 in the race, retiring after 5 laps with a broken fuel system. The 201C eventually only raced at the German and Dutch Grands Prix, with the 201 being driven in the other races. The car's best result was a 7th for Johansson in the Netherlands.

== Complete Formula One World Championship results ==
(key)

Year	Entrant	Chassis	Engine	Tyres	Drivers	1	2	3	4	5	6	7	8	9	10	11	12	13	14	15	Points	WCC
1983	Spirit Racing		Honda RA163E; V6 tc	G		BRA	USW	FRA	SMR	MON	BEL	DET	CAN	GBR	GER	AUT	NED	ITA	EUR	RSA	0	NC
1983	Spirit Racing	201	Honda RA163E; V6 tc	G	Stefan Johansson									Ret		12		Ret	14		0	NC
1983	Spirit Racing	201C	Honda RA163E; V6 tc	G	Stefan Johansson										Ret		7				0	NC
