= Aldo Bertuzzi =

Italian racing driver

Aldo Bertuzzi (born 15 April 1961) is an Italian former racing driver. He raced in the European Formula 2 Championship

== Complete European Formula Two Championship results ==
(key) (Races in bold indicate pole position; races in italics indicate fastest lap)

| Year | Entrant | Chassis | Engine | 1 | 2 | 3 | 4 | 5 | 6 | 7 | 8 | 9 | 10 | 11 | 12 | 13 | Pos | Pts |
|---|---|---|---|---|---|---|---|---|---|---|---|---|---|---|---|---|---|---|
| 1982 | Brambilla Racing | Minardi GM75 | BMW | SIL | HOC | THR | NÜR | MUG | VAL | PAU | SPA | HOC | DON; DNQ | MAN; DNQ | PER | MIS | - | 0 |
| 1983 | San Remo Racing | Minardi M283 | BMW | SIL | THR | HOC; 13 | | | | | | | | | | | - | 0 |
| 1983 | San Remo Racing | Toleman TG280 | BMW | | | | NÜR; 13 | | | | | | | | | | - | 0 |
| 1983 | San Remo Racing | March 832 | BMW | | | | | VAL; 13 | PAU; DNQ | JAR; 15 | DON; Ret | MIS; Ret | PER; DNS | ZOL; 13 | | | - | 0 |
| 1983 | Minardi Team Srl | Minardi M283 | BMW | | | | | | | | | | | | MUG; DNS | | - | 0 |
| 1984 | Merzario Team Srl | Merzario M84 | BMW | SIL; Ret | HOC; 12 | THR; DNS | VAL | MUG | PAU | HOC | MIS | PER | DON | BRH | | | - | 0 |

== Complete International Formula 3000 results ==
(key) (Races in bold indicate pole position; races in italics indicate fastest lap.)

| Year | Entrant | Chassis | Engine | 1 | 2 | 3 | 4 | 5 | 6 | 7 | 8 | 9 | 10 | 11 | 12 | Pos. | Pts |
|---|---|---|---|---|---|---|---|---|---|---|---|---|---|---|---|---|---|
| 1985 | San Remo Racing | March 85B | Cosworth | SIL | THR | EST | NÜR | VAL | PAU | SPA | DIJ; 11 | PER | ÖST | ZAN | DON | NC | 0 |
| 1986 | Minardi Team Adolfo | Minardi M185 | Cosworth | SIL | VAL; DNQ | PAU; DNQ | | | | | | | | | | NC | 0 |
| 1986 | Équipe Dollop | March 85B | Cosworth | | | | SPA | IMO; DNQ | MUG; DNQ | PER | ÖST | BIR | BUG; DNQ | | | NC | 0 |
| 1986 | Corbari Italia/ITI F3000 | March 86B | Cosworth | | | | | | | | | | | JAR; DNQ | | NC | 0 |
| 1987 | First Racing | March 87B | Cosworth | SIL; DNQ | VAL | SPA | PAU; DNQ | DON | PER | BRH | BIR | IMO; 9 | BUG | JAR | | NC | 0 |

== Non Championship Formula 3000 results ==
(key) (Races in bold indicate pole position; races in italics indicate fastest lap.)

| Year | Entrant | Chassis | Engine | Race | Position |
|---|---|---|---|---|---|
| 1985 | San Remo Racing | March 85B | Cosworth | Curaçao Grand Prix | 10 |

== Complete 24 Hours of Le Mans results ==
| Year | Class | No | Tyres | Car | Team | Co-Drivers | Laps | Pos. | Class Pos. |
|---|---|---|---|---|---|---|---|---|---|
| 1985 | C2 | 81 | **A** | Alba AR2; Carma 1.9L t/c | (Italy) Carma F.F. (Cheetah) | (Switzerland) Loris Kessel (Italy) Ruggero Melgrati (Switzerland) Jean-Pierre Frey | - | DNS | DNS |
| 1985 | C2 | 80 | **A** | Alba AR6; Carma 1.9L t/c | (Italy) Carma F.F. | (Italy) Martino Finotto (Italy) Guido Daccò | 228 | DNF | DNF |
