= Merzario =

Sports organization

- Full name: Team Merzario
- Founder(s): Arturo Merzario, Guglielmo Bellasi
- Noted staff: Giampaolo Dallara, Simon Hadfield
- Noted drivers: (Italy) Arturo Merzario (Italy) Alberto Colombo (Italy) Gianfranco Brancatelli

Formula One World Championship career
- First entry: 1977 Spanish Grand Prix
- Races entered: 38
- Engines: Cosworth
- Constructors' Championships: 0
- Drivers' Championships: 0
- Race victories: 0
- Points: 0
- Pole positions: 0
- Fastest laps: 0
- Final entry: 1979 United States Grand Prix

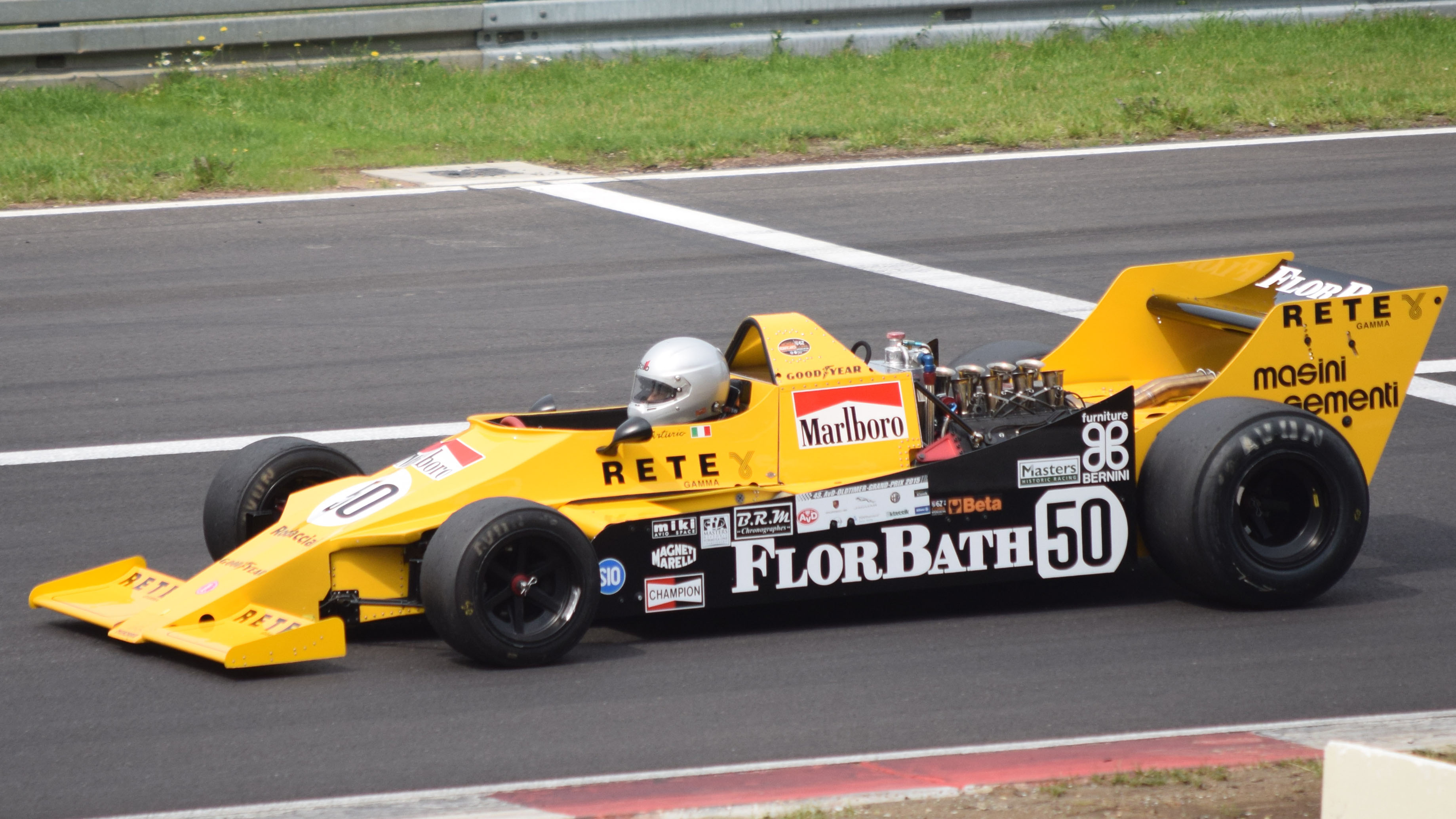
The Merzario A2 from 1979 being driven in 2015

Merzario was a Formula One and Formula Two team and constructor from Italy. The team participated in 38 Formula One World Championship Grands Prix but scored no championship points.

== Formula One ==
=== 1977 ===
Merzario was set up in 1977 by former Ferrari, Williams and March driver Arturo Merzario when he could no longer find a drive with an established team. He initially campaigned a March 761B during 1977, his best result being 14th in the 1977 Belgian Grand Prix. This proved to be the only occasion in three years of participation in Formula One that one of their cars was classified at the finish of a World Championship Grand Prix. During the early part of the season Merzario's car was consistently the fastest of a number of March 761s on the grid, though as the season wore on, he slipped down the grids and finally decided to abandon the season and concentrate on the following year and his new car.

=== 1978 ===
In 1978 Merzario partnered with Swiss Formula One entrant Guglielmo Bellasi and laid the foundation for his own team. Merzario's first self-built Formula One effort, the A1, appeared in 1978 and was a basically conventional car based largely on his March 761B, with a red colour scheme and crude bodywork vaguely reminiscent of a Ferrari 312T2 in its use of cockpit-side ducting for an air intake. It used the then-common combination of the Cosworth DFV engine and Hewland gearbox. The livery changed from red to black before the 1978 Monaco Grand Prix, though it was not until the Swedish Grand Prix that it finished a race, although unclassified, being eight laps adrift of the winner after a long pitstop. For the Austrian Grand Prix, a second A1 was unveiled, although it was suspected that this was actually the team's old March 761B with new bodywork. With this car at his disposal, Merzario performed slightly better in qualifying but still failed to be classified in a race. For the Italian Grand Prix, both A1s were entered, with Alberto Colombo driving the original A1 and Merzario taking the newer second A1. Colombo posted the slowest time during qualifying and did not make the grid, while Merzario qualified comfortably, only for the engine to fail during the race. The team qualified the car on eight occasions during 1978, but retired seven times with mechanical failures.

=== 1979 ===
For the 1979 Formula One season the second A1 was revised into the A1B with more elegant bodywork and revised front suspension, and a new yellow and black livery. The A1B was the only Merzario to qualify for Grands Prix during 1979, which it did twice, though it retired on both occasions.

The A2 (designated A3 by some sources), designed by Merzario and Simon Hadfield and based on the first A1, was ready in time for the European rounds of the 1979 season with the same engine and gearbox combination, and it had been modified into a ground effect 'wing' car. Only one example was built. The A2 first took to the racetrack at the 1979 United States Grand Prix West in the hands of Arturo Merzario. Merzario qualified the car for the race but after the front suspension failed he had to start the race in the A1B. The car officially made its debut at the 1979 Spanish Grand Prix, where Merzario set the 26th time during qualifying and failed to make the race. At the next race in Belgium, Merzario crashed during qualifying and broke his arm. For Monaco Merzario asked Gianfranco Brancatelli to drive his car, but Brancatelli failed to pre-qualify. Merzario was back at the wheel at the French Grand Prix. He set the 26th time during qualifying and was more than two seconds slower than the last qualifier. The A2 took to the track for the last time at the Austrian Grand Prix, after Merzario damaged the A4 in a practice accident.

By this time, Merzario and Bellasi had purchased the assets of the Kauhsen team (and their driver Brancatelli), arguably taking on cars even worse than his old March-based vehicle. The Kauhsen chassis was rebuilt by Giampaolo Dallara and renamed the Merzario A4. The A4 employed the same Cosworth / Hewland running gear and the suspension was similar to the A2, but the bodywork was less bulky, with better sidepods for improved airflow. However, the car again failed to qualify for every Grand Prix that it entered, proving even slower than its predecessors. The only time the A4 was not the slowest car in qualifying was at the Italian Grand Prix, where Héctor Rebaque was seven tenths slower in his Rebaque HR100. However, Merzario did qualify and race the car in the non-championship Dino Ferrari Grand Prix at Imola, where he finished 11th and last, two laps down.

== After Formula One ==
After plans to modify the A4 into the A5 were not completed due to financial problems, Merzario turned to constructing Formula Two cars. He was keen to point out that the engine bay of his 1980 BMW-engined M1 F2 machine could easily be modified to take a Cosworth DFV F1 engine, though no such effort was ever made. The car was fairly unsuccessful in F2, and Merzario decided to return to running March chassis for 1981. With March 812s, the team finally scored two podiums in F2, with Piero Necchi at the wheel, but after a lacklustre 1982 season, Merzario again built his own cars for 1983 with minimal success. After moving down to Italian Formula 3, he finally moved away from team ownership in the mid-1980s.

== Racing record ==
=== Complete Formula One results ===
(key)

Year	Chassis	Engine	Tyres	Drivers	No.	1	2	3	4	5	6	7	8	9	10	11	12	13	14	15	16	17	Pts	WCC
1977	March 761B	Cosworth DFV 3.0 V8	G			ARG	BRA	RSA	USW	ESP	MON	BEL	SWE	FRA	GBR	GER	AUT	NED	ITA	USA	CAN	JPN	0	NC
1977	March 761B	Cosworth DFV 3.0 V8	G	(Italy) Arturo Merzario	37					Ret	DNQ	14		Ret	Ret	DNQ		DNQ					0	NC
1978	Merzario A1	Cosworth DFV 3.0 V8	G			ARG	BRA	RSA	USW	MON	BEL	ESP	SWE	FRA	GBR	GER	AUT	NED	ITA	USA	CAN		0	NC
1978	Merzario A1	Cosworth DFV 3.0 V8	G	(Italy) Arturo Merzario	37	Ret	DNQ	Ret	Ret	DNPQ	DNPQ	DNQ	NC	DNQ	Ret	DNQ	DNQ	Ret	Ret	Ret	DNQ		0	NC
1978	Merzario A1	Cosworth DFV 3.0 V8	G	(Italy) Alberto Colombo	34														DNPQ				0	NC
1979	Merzario A1B	Cosworth DFV 3.0 V8	G			ARG	BRA	RSA	USW	ESP	BEL	MON	FRA	GBR	GER	AUT	NED	ITA	CAN	USA			0	NC
1979	Merzario A1B	Cosworth DFV 3.0 V8	G	(Italy) Arturo Merzario	24	Ret	DNQ	DNQ	Ret														0	NC
1979	Merzario A2	Cosworth DFV 3.0 V8	G	(Italy) Arturo Merzario	24				DNS	DNQ	DNQ		DNQ			DNQ							0	NC
1979	Merzario A2	Cosworth DFV 3.0 V8	G	(Italy) Gianfranco Brancatelli	24							DNPQ											0	NC
1979	Merzario A4	Cosworth DFV 3.0 V8	G	(Italy) Arturo Merzario	24									DNQ	DNQ	PO	DNQ	DNQ	DNQ	DNQ			0	NC

=== Complete Formula Two results ===
(key)

Year	Chassis	Engine	Drivers	1	2	3	4	5	6	7	8	9	10	11	12	13
1980	Merzario M1	BMW		THR	HOC	NÜR	VAL	PAU	SIL	ZOL	MUG	ZAN	PER	MIS	HOC	
1980	Merzario M1	BMW	(Italy) Arturo Merzario	Ret	Ret	Ret		9	Ret		16	17	DNS		Ret	
1980	Merzario M1	BMW	(Italy) Guido Daccò			11	Ret									
1980	Merzario M1	BMW	(Italy) Piero Necchi				Ret	Ret	12	Ret	Ret	Ret	Ret	DNQ	12	
1981	Merzario M1; March 812	BMW		SIL	HOC	THR	NÜR	VAL	MUG	PAU	PER	SPA	DON	MIS	MAN	
1981	Merzario M1; March 812	BMW	(Italy) Piero Necchi	DNS	DNS	6	Ret	Ret	3	3	11	7	Ret			
1981	Merzario M1; March 812	BMW	(Italy) Gianfranco Trombetti	20	Ret	Ret		DNQ	Ret	Ret	12	12		12	13	
1981	Merzario M1; March 812	BMW	(Italy) Arturo Merzario	DNQ		DNS	Ret								Ret	
1981	Merzario M1; March 812	BMW	(Italy) Marco Brand					DNQ				Ret				
1981	Merzario M1; March 812	BMW	(Switzerland) Loris Kessel							DNPQ			19			
1981	Merzario M1; March 812	BMW	(Italy) Guido Daccò								Ret					
1981	Merzario M1; March 812	BMW	(Austria) Jo Gartner											DNQ	8	
1982	Merzario 822	BMW		SIL	HOC	THR	NÜR	MUG	VAL	PAU	SPA	HOC	DON	MAN	PER	MIS
1982	Merzario 822	BMW	(Austria) Jo Gartner	6	Ret	10	Ret	Ret	7	Ret	15	7	Ret	Ret		
1982	Merzario 822	BMW	(Italy) Oscar Pedersoli	Ret	Ret	19	DNS	Ret		Ret	Ret	Ret	Ret	Ret	Ret	Ret
1982	Merzario 822	BMW	(France) Richard Dallest	DNS	Ret	6	Ret									
1982	Merzario 822	BMW	(Germany) Harald Brutschin					13	DNQ	DNQ	17	Ret				
1982	Merzario 822	BMW	(Italy) Guido Daccò										12	8	7	13
1982	Merzario 822	BMW	(Italy) Roberto Campominosi												10	
1982	Merzario 822	BMW	(Italy) Lamberto Leoni													14
1983	Merzario M28	BMW		SIL	THR	HOC	NÜR	VAL	PAU	JAR	DON	MIS	PER	ZOL	MUG	
1983	Merzario M28	BMW	(Italy) Fulvio Ballabio	Ret	Ret	14	Ret									
1983	Merzario M28	BMW	(Italy) Guido Daccò	Ret	Ret	15										
1983	Merzario M28	BMW	(France) Richard Dallest				Ret	Ret	Ret	8		7	Ret		8	
1984	Merzario M84	BMW		SIL	HOC	THR	VAL	MUG	PAU	HOC	MIS	PER	DON	BRH		
1984	Merzario M84	BMW	(Italy) Stefano Livio	10	13	12	Ret	13	Ret							
1984	Merzario M84	BMW	(Italy) Aldo Bertuzzi	Ret	12	DNS										
1984	Merzario M84	BMW	(Switzerland) Max Busslinger						10							
