= Roberto Del Castello =

Italian racing driver

Roberto Del Castello (born 13 September 1957) is an Italian racing driver.

== Racing record ==
=== Complete European Formula Two Championship results ===
(key) (Races in bold indicate pole position; races in italics indicate fastest lap)

Year	Entrant	Chassis	Engine	1	2	3	4	5	6	7	8	9	10	11	12	13	Pos.	Pts
1981	Sanremo Racing Srl	March 782	BMW	SIL	HOC	THR	NÜR	VAL	MUG; 18	PAU	PER; 10	SPA	DON	MIS; Ret	MAN		NC	0
1982	Sanremo Racing Srl	Toleman TG280	BMW	SIL; 4	HOC; 7	THR; Ret	NÜR; DNS	MUG; Ret	VAL; 10	PAU; Ret	SPA; 14	HOC; Ret	DON	MAN; 10	PER; 9	MIS; 11	16th	3
1983	Mint Engineering	March 832	BMW	SIL; Ret	THR; Ret	HOC; Ret	NÜR	VAL; DNS	PAU; DNQ	JAR; 11							12th	4
1983	James Gresham Racing	March 832	BMW								DON; 11	MIS; 3	PER; 13	ZOL; 10	MUG; DNS		12th	4
1984	Minardi Team	Minardi M283	BMW	SIL; Ret	HOC; 8	THR; 10	VAL; 9	MUG; 12	PAU; Ret	HOC; 6	MIS; 7	PER; Ret	DON; 12	BRH; Ret			15th	1

=== Complete International Formula 3000 results ===
(key) (Races in bold indicate pole position; races in italics indicate fastest lap.)

Year	Entrant	Chassis	Engine	1	2	3	4	5	6	7	8	9	10	11	12	Pos.	Pts
1985	San Remo Racing	March 85B	Cosworth	SIL	THR; 14	EST; 8	NÜR; C	VAL; 7	PAU	SPA	DIJ	PER	ÖST	ZAN	DON	NC	0
