= Thierry Tassin =

Belgian racing driver (born 1959)

- Born: Thierry Dominique Marie Georges Ghislain Tassin; 11 January 1959 (age 67)

NASCAR O'Reilly Auto Parts Series career
- 1 race run over 1 year
- Best finish: 95th (1989)
- First race: 1989 GM Parts 300 (Nazareth)
- Last race: 1989 GM Parts 300 (Nazareth)
Wins	Top tens	Poles
0	0	0

Thierry Dominique Marie Georges Ghislain Tassin (born 11 January 1959) is a Belgian racing driver. He won the prestigious Spa 24 Hours endurance race on four occasions (1983, '86, '94 and '96) - all in a BMW.

== Racing record ==
=== Complete European Formula Two Championship results ===
(key) (Races in bold indicate pole position; races in italics indicate fastest lap)

Year	Entrant	Chassis	Engine	1	2	3	4	5	6	7	8	9	10	11	12	13	Pos.	Pts
1982	Docking Spitzley Ltd	Docking-Spitzley DS1	Hart	SIL; DSQ	HOC; 6	THR; Ret	**NÜR**; 18	MUG; 9	VAL; Ret	PAU; Ret	SPA; Ret	HOC	DON; Ret	MAN	PER	MIS; DNQ	18th	1
1983	Onyx Race Engineering	March 832	BMW	SIL; Ret	THR; 4	HOC; 6	NÜR; 6	VAL; 4	PAU; 4	JAR	DON	MIS	PER	ZOL	MUG		8th	11
1984	Onyx Race Engineering	March 842	BMW	SIL; 4	HOC; 7	THR; 5	VAL; 10	MUG; 5	PAU; Ret	HOC; 2	MIS; 4	PER	DON; 5	BRH; 7			7th	18

=== Complete International Formula 3000 results ===
(key) (Races in bold indicate pole position; races in italics indicate fastest lap.)

Year	Entrant	Chassis	Engine	1	2	3	4	5	6	7	8	9	10	11	12	Pos.	Pts
1985	PMC Motorsport	Williams FW08C	Cosworth	SIL; NC	THR; 13											17th	1
1985	Eddie Jordan Racing	March 85B	Cosworth			EST; Ret	NÜR	VAL	PAU	SPA; Ret	DIJ; Ret	PER	ÖST; 6	ZAN; 8	DON; Ret	17th	1
1986	Eddie Jordan Racing	March 86B	Cosworth	SIL; 22†	VAL	PAU	SPA	IMO	MUG	PER	ÖST	BIR	BUG	JAR		NC	0
1987	GA Motorsport	Lola T87/50	Cosworth	SIL	VAL	SPA; 16	PAU	DON	PER	BRH	BIR	IMO	BUG	JAR		NC	0

=== Complete British Saloon Car Championship results ===
(key) (Races in bold indicate pole position; races in italics indicate fastest lap.)

Year	Team	Car	Class	1	2	3	4	5	6	7	8	9	10	11	12	DC	Pts	Class
1978	Thierry Tassin	Volkswagen Golf GTI	B	SIL	OUL	THR	BRH	SIL	DON; 2†‡	MAL	BRH	DON	BRH	THR	OUL	NC‡	0‡	NC‡

† Events with 2 races staged for the different classes.

‡ Car not to full BSCC specification - Not eligible for points.

=== Complete World Touring Car Championship results ===
(key) (Races in bold indicate pole position) (Races in italics indicate fastest lap)

Year	Team	Car	1	2	3	4	5	6	7	8	9	10	11	DC	Pts
1987	(United Kingdom) Andy Rouse Engineering	Ford Sierra RS Cosworth	**MNZ**; Ret	JAR ovr:14 cls:3	DIJ ovr:5 cls:3	NUR ovr:8 cls:2	SPA; Ret							25th	58
1987	(United Kingdom) Andy Rouse Engineering	Ford Sierra RS500						BNO; Ret	SIL; Ret					25th	58
1987	(Australia) Allan Moffat Enterprises	Ford Sierra RS500								BAT; Ret	CLD; Ret	WEL	FJI	25th	58

=== NASCAR ===
(key) (Bold – Pole position awarded by qualifying time. Italics – Pole position earned by points standings or practice time. * – Most laps led.)

==== Busch Series ====
NASCAR Busch Series results
Year	Team	No.	Make	1	2	3	4	5	6	7	8	9	10	11	12	13	14	15	16	17	18	19	20	21	22	23	24	25	26	27	28	29	NBGNC	Pts	Ref
1989	Pearson Racing	90	Buick	DAY	CAR	MAR	HCY	DAR	BRI	NZH; 40	SBO	LAN	NSV	CLT	DOV	ROU	LVL	VOL	MYB	SBO	HCY	DUB	IRP	ROU	BRI	DAR	RCH	DOV	MAR	CLT	CAR	MAR	95th	43	

=== Complete Super Tourenwagen Cup results ===
(key) (Races in bold indicate pole position) (Races in italics indicate fastest lap)

Year	Team	Car	1	2	3	4	5	6	7	8	Pos.	Pts
1994	BMW Team Belgium	BMW 318is	AVU; 7	WUN; Ret	ZOL	ZAN	ÖST	SAL	SPA	NÜR	18th	4
