= Guido Daccò =

- Born: 10 September 1947
- Died: 29 July 2006 (aged 58)

Formula One World Championship career
- Nationality: (Italy) Italian

British Formula One Championship career
- Active years: 1980
- Entries: 1
- Championships: 0
- Wins: 0
- Podiums: 0
- Career points: 0
- Pole positions: 0
- Fastest laps: 0

Guido Daccò (10 September 1947 – 29 July 2006) was an Italian race car and motorcycle racer from Limbiate. He began motorcycle racing in 1969 and from 1980 to 1984 he raced in Formula 2. He then drove in the 1985 24 Hours of Le Mans and began racing in Formula 3000. In 1988, he moved to the United States to drive in the Indy Lights series where he placed tenth in series points. In 1989, he made his CART debut for Dale Coyne Racing. Daccò had little success in CART and bounced from team to team until 1992, making 23 starts with a best finish of 12th. He failed to qualify for the Indianapolis 500 in his attempts in 1990 and 1991. He returned to Europe in 1992 to drive two races in German Formula 3 and then retired from racing. He made occasional drives in historic races and managed an FIA GT team.

Daccò died on 29 July 2006, after a long battle with an undisclosed illness.

== Racing career results ==
=== Complete British Formula One Championship results ===
(key) (Races in bold indicate pole position; races in italics indicate fastest lap)

Year	Entrant	Chassis	Engine	1	2	3	4	5	6	7	8	9	10	11	12	Pos.	Pts
1980	Sanremo Racing Srl	March 792	BMW	OUL	BRH	SIL	MAL	THR	MNZ; 7	MAL	SNE	BRH	THR	OUL	SIL	NC	0

=== Complete European Formula Two Championship results ===
(key) (Races in bold indicate pole position; races in italics indicate fastest lap)

Year	Entrant	Chassis	Engine	1	2	3	4	5	6	7	8	9	10	11	12	13	Pos.	Pts
1980	Merzario Team Srl	Merzario M1	BMW	THR	HOC	NÜR; 11	VLL; Ret	PAU	SIL	ZOL							NC	0
1980	Sanremo Racing Srl	March 782	BMW								MUG; Ret	ZAN					NC	0
1980	Sanremo Racing Srl	March 792	BMW										PER; 12	MIS; DNQ	HOC; 11		NC	0
1981	DAC Sport Racing	Minardi GM75	BMW	SIL; 17	HOC; 11	THR	NÜR; Ret	VLL; 12	MUG; 20	PAU		SPA; 17	DON; Ret	MIS; DNQ	MAN; 12		NC	0
1981	Astra Team Merzario Srl	Merzario M1	BMW								PER; Ret						NC	0
1982	Brambilla Racing	Minardi GM75	BMW	SIL; 9	HOC; Ret	THR; 17	NÜR; Ret	MUG; Ret	VLL; DNQ	PAU; DNPQ	SPA; 18	HOC; 13					NC	0
1982	Team Merzario	Merzario 282	BMW										DON; 12	MAN; 8	PER; 7	MIS; 13	NC	0
1983	Team Merzario Srl	Merzario M82	BMW	SIL; Ret	THR; Ret	HOC; 15											13th	4
1983	Sanremo Racing Srl	Lola T850	BMW				NÜR; Ret	VLL; 6	PAU; Ret								13th	4
1983	Sanremo Racing Srl	March 832	BMW							JAR; Ret	DON; Ret	MIS; 4	PER; Ret	ZOL; Ret	MUG; Ret		13th	4
1984	Sanremo Racing Srl	March 832	BMW	SIL; Ret	HOC; 10	THR; 8	VLL; 11	MUG; 8	PAU; 8	HOC; 11	MIS; 5	PER; 8	DON; 9	BRH; Ret			13th	2

=== Complete International Formula 3000 results ===
(key) (Races in bold indicate pole position; races in italics indicate fastest lap.)

Year	Entrant	Chassis	Engine	1	2	3	4	5	6	7	8	9	10	11	12	Pos.	Pts
1985	Sanremo Racing	March 85B	Cosworth	SIL	THR	EST	NÜR	VLL	PAU; DNS	SPA; 5	DIJ; 5	PER; 6	ÖST; 12	ZAN; 6	DON; 7	13th	6
1986	Sanremo Racing	March 86B	Cosworth	SIL; DNQ												NC	0
1986	Horag Racing	Lola T86/50	Cosworth		VLL; 15	PAU	SPA; DNQ									NC	0
1986	Coloni Racing	March 85B	Cosworth					IMO; 14	MUG; DNQ							NC	0
1986	Giorgio Cajelli Racing	March 85B	Cosworth							PER; 16						NC	0
1986	ITI 3000	March 86B	Cosworth								ÖST; 16	BIR; DNQ	BUG; 16	JAR; DNQ		NC	0
1987	Equipe Dollop	March 86B	Cosworth	SIL	VLL; DNQ	SPA; DNQ	PAU; DNQ	DON; DNQ								NC	0
1987	EuroVenturini	Dallara 3087	Cosworth						PER; 12	BRH; DNQ	BIR	IMO	BUG	JAR		NC	0

=== American open-wheel racing results ===
==== American Racing Series ====
Year	Team	1	2	3	4	5	6	7	8	9	10	11	12	Pos.	Pts	Ref
1986	Agapiou Racing	PHX	MIL	MEA	TOR	POC	MDO	ROA	LAG	PHX	MIA; 7			27th	6	
1987	Agapiou Racing	PHX	MIL	MEA	CLE	TOR	POC	MDO	NAZ	LAG	MIA; 6			17th	8	
1988	Agapiou Racing	PHX; 6	MIL; 10	POR; 6	CLE; 5	TOR; 3	MEA; 6	POC; 13	MDO; 14	ROA	NAZ; 11	LAG; 13	MIA; 16	10th	53	

==== PPG Indy Car World Series ====
(key) (Races in bold indicate pole position)

Year	Team	No.	Chassis	Engine	1	2	3	4	5	6	7	8	9	10	11	12	13	14	15	16	17	Pos.	Pts	Ref
1989	Dale Coyne Racing	19	Lola T88/00	Cosworth DFX V8t	PHX; 24	LBH; 22	INDY; DNQ	MIL; 14	DET; 12	POR; 12	CLE; 21	MEA; DNQ										29th	3	
1989	ATEC Environmental	96	Lola T88/00	Cosworth DFX V8t									TOR; 21									29th	3	
1989	Euromotorsport	50	Lola T88/00	Cosworth DFX V8t										MCH; 13	POC	MDO; 26	ROA; 26	NAZ; 12	LAG; 26			29th	3	
1990	Euromotorsport	50	Lola T88/00	Cosworth DFX V8t	PHX; 12																	29th	1	
1990	Bettenhausen Motorsports	16	Lola T89/00	Cosworth DFX V8t		LBH; 23																29th	1	
1990	Burns Racing Team	66	Lola T89/00	Judd V8t			INDY; DNQ	MIL	DET	POR	CLE	MEA										29th	1	
1990	Nu-Tech Motorsports	33	Lola T89/00	Cosworth DFX V8t									TOR; 23	MCH	DEN	VAN	MDO	ROA; 14	NAZ; 13	LAG; 16		29th	1	
1991	Genoa Racing	33	Lola T90/00	Cosworth DFS V8t	SRF	LBH; 14	PHX; 20	INDY; DNQ	MIL	DET; 21	POR; 18	CLE	MEA	TOR	MCH	DEN	VAN	MDO	ROA	NAZ	LAG	36th	0	
1992	Euromotorsport	42	Lola T90/00	Cosworth DFS V8t	SRF	PHX	LBH	INDY	DET	POR	MIL	NHA	TOR	MCH	CLE	ROA	VAN	MDO	NAZ; 23	LAG		55th	0	

=== Complete 24 Hours of Le Mans results ===
Year	Team	Co-Drivers	Car	Class	Laps	Pos.	Class Pos.
1984	(Italy) Scuderia Jolly Club	(Italy) Almo Coppelli (Italy) Davide Pavia	Alba AR2-Giannini	C2	262	19th	5th
1985	(Italy) Carma F.F.	(Italy) Martino Finotto (Italy) Aldo Bertuzzi	Alba AR6-Carma FF	C2	228	DNF	DNF
