= Pierre Petit (racing driver) =

French racing driver (born 1957)

Pierre Petit (French: [pjɛʁ pəti]; born 27 September 1957 in Guéret) is a French racing driver. In 1982, he won the French Formula Three Championship. In 1995, he finished third at 24 Hours of Le Mans in the LMP2 class.
