= BS Fabrications =

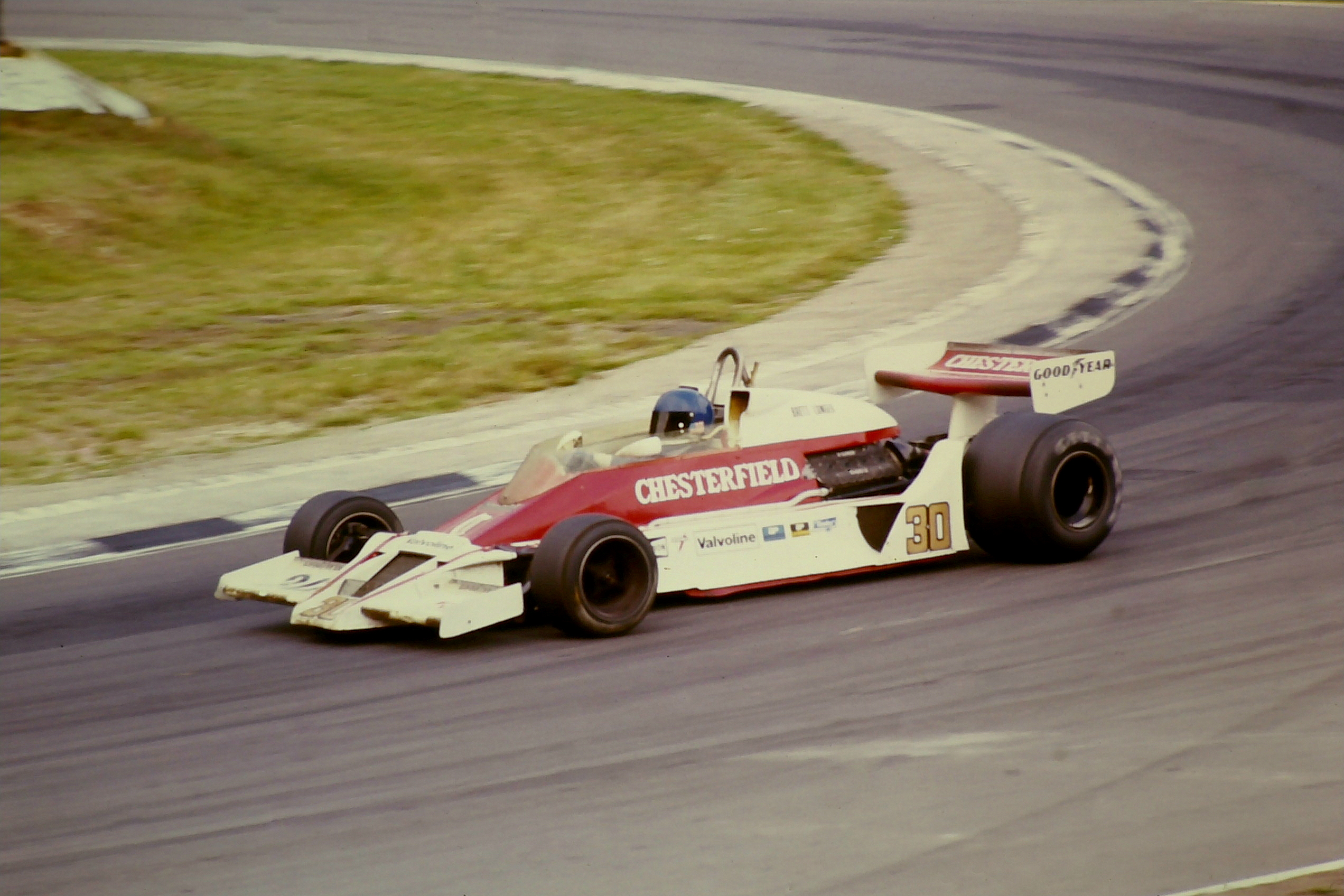
- Full name: (United Kingdom) BS Fabrications
- Base: Luton, Bedfordshire, England
- Founder(s): Bob Sparshott; John Woodington
- Noted staff: Bob Sparshott; John Woodington; A.S. Young Sr.
- Noted drivers: (France) Henri Pescarolo (United States) Brett Lunger (Brazil) Nelson Piquet

Formula One World Championship career
- First entry: 1976 Monaco Grand Prix
- Races entered: 36
- Drivers' Championships: 0
- Race victories: 0
- Pole positions: 0
- Fastest laps: 0
- Final entry: 1978 Italian Grand Prix

BS Fabrications was an engineering company specialising in fabrications for Formula One teams founded by Bob Sparshott, a former engineer at Lotus who had worked with Jim Clark and Graham Hill, and John 'Ace' Woodington in Luton in 1972. The company also ran a number of private F1 cars for customers in Grand Prix racing between 1972 and 1978.

== History ==
In 1972, the company ran American Brett Lunger in a March F2. They first entered F1 in 1972 under the name of Space Racing when they built a hybrid F1/F2 March for Mike Beuttler using a Formula 2 monocoque with a F1 engine. They returned under the B&S Fabrications name in 1976, with a Surtees for Henri Pescarolo. The team managed a best finish on the season of 9th at the 1976 Austrian Grand Prix. In the 1977 Formula One World Championship season the team briefly ran a March and then a new McLaren M23 for Lunger. The team matched its best finish to date, with a 9th place at the 1977 Dutch Grand Prix.

The team began the 1978 campaign with the pairing of its reliable McLaren M23 and Lunger, who was returning for his second season driving for the team. After just 4 Grands Prix the switch to the new M26 was made. Subsequently Lunger posted the 3 best performances of his Formula One career, a 7th-place finish in the Belgian Grand Prix and an 8th at both the British and Austrian Grands Prix. With Lunger having some success in the McLaren M26, the team placed Brazilian rookie, and future 3-time Formula One World Champion Nelson Piquet in its M23 for its final 3 Grands Prix of the season. Piquet was able to post a best finish of 9th in the Italian Grand Prix.

The team never completed a full season, having run all but 2 Grands Prix in 1978. It also never scored a Formula One Championship point, coming closest with Lunger at the 1978 Belgian Grand Prix where they finished 7th, just one spot out of the points.

In 1980, the factory was involved in the building of the Toleman TG280.

The team also ran in F2 and F3000, under the name BS Automotive, providing Christian Danner with his F3000 championship win in 1985.

Sparshott still operates an engineering company associated with motorsport.

== Complete Formula One World Championship results ==
(key)

Year	Chassis	Engine(s)	Tyres	Drivers	1	2	3	4	5	6	7	8	9	10	11	12	13	14	15	16	17
1976	Surtees TS19	Ford Cosworth DFV 3.0 V8	G		BRA	RSA	USW	ESP	BEL	MON	SWE	FRA	GBR	GER	AUT	NED	ITA	CAN	USA	JPN	
1976	Surtees TS19	Ford Cosworth DFV 3.0 V8	G	(France) Henri Pescarolo						DNQ		Ret	Ret	DNQ	9	11	17	19	NC		
1977	March 761	Ford Cosworth DFV 3.0 V8	G		ARG	BRA	RSA	USW	ESP	MON	BEL	SWE	FRA	GBR	GER	AUT	NED	ITA	USA	CAN	JPN
1977	March 761	Ford Cosworth DFV 3.0 V8	G	(United States) Brett Lunger			14	Ret	10												
1977	McLaren M23	Ford Cosworth DFV 3.0 V8	G	(United States) Brett Lunger							DNS	11	DNQ	13	Ret	10	9	Ret	10	11	
1978	McLaren M26	Ford Cosworth DFV 3.0 V8	G		ARG	BRA	RSA	USW	MON	BEL	ESP	SWE	FRA	GBR	GER	AUT	NED	ITA	USA	CAN	
1978	McLaren M26	Ford Cosworth DFV 3.0 V8	G	(United States) Brett Lunger					DNPQ	7	DNQ	DNQ	Ret	8	DNPQ	8	Ret	Ret			
1978	McLaren M23	Ford Cosworth DFV 3.0 V8	G	(United States) Brett Lunger	13	Ret	11	DNQ													
1978	McLaren M23	Ford Cosworth DFV 3.0 V8	G	(Brazil) Nelson Piquet												Ret	Ret	9			
