= Lola T850 =

Open-wheel Formula 2 racing car

The Lola T850 is an open-wheel Formula Two racing car from the British manufacturer Lola Cars, which was used in the European and Japanese Formula Two Championships in the early 1980s. It is not an original Lola design, but a license-produced continuation of the Toleman TG280, itself based on the Ralt RT2. A further variant is the Docking Spitzley DS1. Lola also built a version destined for Formula Atlantic, sold as the Toleman TA860.

== History ==
Lola was represented in the early years of the European Formula Two Championship in the late 1960s, most prominently with the T100 and T102 models through a works collaboration with BMW. In the 1970s, Lola was focused primarily on American racing series and only sporadically produced chassis for Formula Two. In 1976, Lola built four T450 Formula Two cars, which often struggled to qualify. The one-off successor for 1977, the T550 was even worse, failing to start a race at all.

After a break of several years, Lola returned to Formula Two at the start of the 1981 season with the T850. It was based on the Ralt RT2, which was run exclusively by the British Toleman team in the 1979 European Formula Two Championship. For the 1980 season, Toleman engineer Rory Byrne had further developed the RT2 into the Toleman TG280, with which Brian Henton won the championship title. The following year, Toleman moved up to Formula One. The old TG280s would continue to see use, to modest success, in the hands of drivers like Jim Crawford and Jo Gartner as late as 1983. Interest in the cars was so great that Toleman decided to start producing more customer vehicles. However, because Toleman had no capacity to build Formula Two customer cars in addition to its Formula One commitment, Lola was commissioned to build new customer TG280s. Lola produced a series of ten cars and sold them under its own name as the Lola T850 to European and Japanese Formula Two teams.

After the cars were sold, Lola did not continue its involvement in Formula Two. This made the T850 the last Formula Two car to bear the Lola name. Only with the introduction of the successor Formula 3000 category in 1985 did Lola appear again in the class below Formula One with the T950.

== Model designation ==
The model designation follows the nomenclature that was common at Lola at the time: the last two digits represent the racing series for which the respective model was designed (50 for Formula Two) - while the first digit loosely represents the generation of Lola designs it falls within. Accordingly, the T850 is an eighth-generation Lola Formula Two design.

== Racing history ==
The 1981 European Formula Two season was characterized by the dominance of the works March, Maurer and Ralt teams. With the departure of the front-running Project Four and Toleman organizations, the previous midfield teams gained importance as a result. Two of them, Docking Spitzley and Sanremo Racing, became customers of the Lola T850 in 1981. While the car was able to achieve some success in 1981, it was no longer competitive by 1982, and in 1983 it was only used as a stopgap.

=== Docking Spitzley Racing ===
The British Docking Spitzley Racing team, which had fielded two Toleman TG280s as customer cars in 1980, obtained three Lola T850s with Hart engines for the 1981 season for Stefan Johansson, Kenny Acheson, and – in the second half of the season – also for Ricardo Londoño. The team only received the cars five days before the first race of the year and had little time to prepare for the season opener. After a poor debut at Silverstone, Johansson then won the second championship race at the Hockenheimring; he also won the last race of the season at Mantorp Park in Sweden. With second place in Rome and a few points finishes, Johansson ended up fourth in the championship behind Geoff Lees in the works Ralt, Thierry Boutsen in the works March and Eje Elgh in the Maurer. This made him the top-placed driver in a customer team. Acheson finished 15th, and Londoño scored no championship points.

For the 1982 season, Docking Spitzley made its own revisions to the T850s, entering them as Docking Spitzley DS1s.

=== Sanremo Racing ===
The Italian Sanremo team, owned by former racer Alberto Colombo, obtained a Lola T850 for Guido Pardini for the 1981 season. Carlo Rossi, the team's second driver, drove a used 1980 Toleman TG280. Both cars were equipped with Heidegger BMW engines. In the Lola, Pardini performed significantly worse than his teammate: while Rossi finished fourth, fifth and sixth in the old TG280 and finished the championship in 13th place, Pardini retired six times and achieved seventh place in Rome as his best result.

In 1982 Sanremo Racing retained the combination of a Toleman TG280 and a Lola T850 - now two years old. The Hart-engined T850 was initially driven by Eddy Bianchi, the reigning Italian Formula Three champion, who made his Formula Two debut at Sanremo that year. His best race result was eighth at Thruxton in Britain. After this race, he had to end his motorsport commitment for financial reasons. His teammate Roberto Del Castello then took over the T850 - now running a BMW engine - having previously been driving the Toleman. With this combination, he did not finish in the points for the remainder of the season.

In 1983, Sanremo started the new season late for financial reasons. The now three-year-old Toleman TG280 and two-year-old Lola T850 were used as stopgaps for the first few races until the team was able to acquire new March 832s. Guido Daccò drove the Lola T850 with a BMW engine in the team's first three races and finished sixth with it in Rome. That was the last points finish achieved by a T850.

=== Formula Racing Club ===
Lola T850-06 went to the Swiss Formula Racing Club in 1981, who entered it for Lucerne racing driver Fredy Schnarwiler. Schnarwiler drove the car with a Hart engine. He competed in eight races in the 1981 season, retiring from three and finishing five times. His best position was seventh at the Mediterranean Grand Prix.

In 1982, Schnarwiler again used the T850 in the first two championship races, but only started in the opening race at Silverstone. Here he dropped out after four laps due to a technical problem. There was a further entry for the subsequent race at the Hockenheimring, but Schnarwiler did not start. This initially ended his Formula Two engagement. He competed again in the last race of the year in Misano but drove a current March 822.

== Docking Spitzley DS1 ==
For the 1982 season, Docking Spitzley made its own revisions to the T850. This included modifications to the suspension and aerodynamics by Frank Dernie and Pat Symonds. As in the previous year, the cars started with Hart engines; Drivers were Thierry Tassin and Carlo Rossi.

Tassin finished the opening race in second place, but was later disqualified because he was running illegal side skirts. Two weeks later, Tassin finished sixth at the Hockenheimring; that was the only race of that year that he finished in the points. At the second edition of the Grand Prix de Formule 2 Belgique in Spa-Francorchamps, which took place in heavy rain, both drivers went off. Tassin had been running third with Rossi sixth. Both cars were so badly damaged in the accidents that the team had to skip the subsequent championship race, again at the Hockenheimring. Only Tassin's rebuilt car was present at the following race at Donington; Rossi, on the other hand, drove an old Toleman TG280. Like some of its competitors, the team skipped the eleventh race of the season in Sweden because of the long journey. At the final championship round, Docking Spitzley once again registered both drivers with the DS1, but Tassin failed to qualify. After the end of the season, the Docking-Spitzley team, which had suffered from financial difficulties throughout the year, withdrew from Formula Two.

== The Lola T850 in the Japanese Formula 2 Championship ==
Contrary to expectations, Lola was only able to sell two T850s in Japan.

Heroes Racing Corporation used a BMW-engined car for Kazuyoshi Hoshino in the Japanese Formula Two Championship in 1981 and 1982. In the first season, which was dominated by contemporary March models and powerful Honda engines, Hoshino managed one win and one second place, finishing runner-up overall in 1981. Hoshino started the 1982 season again with the T850. After a third place in the opening race and two subsequent retirements, he switched to a current March 822 in the summer of 1982, with which he won the fourth championship race. Heroes Racing gave the T850 to Toshio Suzuki for the last two races, who retired once and finished ninth once.

After a break of more than a year and a half, two Lola T850s appeared again in the last race of the 1984 season in Suzuka. Both had BMW engines tuned by Toda Racing. One car was entered by Gear Racing for Norimasa Sakamoto, who finished 14th and last. Maribu Motorsport Club entered the second T850 for Hironobu Tatsumi. Tatsumi was the first driver in the race to drop out.

== Toleman TA860/Lola T860 ==
With the North American market in mind, Lola built a Formula Atlantic-adapted version of the T850. The car was factory-designated the Lola T860, but was marketed under the Toleman TA860 name. Contrary to expectations, this version was not successful; Lola only sold two cars.

=== United States ===
The first TA860 (VIN HU1) was delivered to US Lola agent Carl Haas in June 1981. Jacques Villeneuve Sr. tested the car but ultimately did not race it. The TA860 made its racing debut more than a year later at a Formula Atlantic race at Road America, where it was entered by Venezuelan racer Juan Cochesa with a Ford BDN engine. In qualifying, Cochesa was last; he finished the race 17th. After that, Cochesa gave up the TA860. In 1985, Peter Heckmann entered him for four out of six rounds of the Formula Atlantic Championship East. His best position was fifth in the penultimate championship race at St. Louis International Raceway. In the overall standings, Heckmann took tenth place with 22 points. After that, this TA860 was no longer used in racing.

=== Australia ===
The second TA860 (VIN HU2) went to Australian racing driver Peter Williamson. He used it from November 1981 to 1984 in the Australian Drivers' Championship, whose Formula Pacific regulations were similar to those of the American Formula Atlantic. In this version, the TA860 had a Toyota engine. Williamson debuted the car at Calder Park Raceway in November 1981 in the Australian Grand Prix. After an accident on the 15th lap, he had to retire. On the TA860's second outing at Oran Park Raceway in April 1982 Williamson again had an accident. The car was so badly damaged that the T860 had to be rebuilt using a new chassis and was out of action for the rest of the year. In 1983, Williamson contested four out of six rounds of the 1983 Australian Drivers' Championship driving the refurbished TA860. His best result was fourth place in the Lakeside race. In the following season there were further entries, but no appearances.

== Race results in the Formula 2 European Championship ==
=== Lola T850 ===
Season	Team	Driver	1	2	3	4	5	6	7	8	9	10	11	12	13	Points	Pos.
1981																	
1981	(United Kingdom) Docking Spitzley Team Toleman	(Sweden) Stefan Johansson	9	1	7	4	2	Ret	8	Ret	14	4	9	1		30	4th
1981	(United Kingdom) Docking Spitzley Team Toleman	(United Kingdom) Kenny Acheson	19	Ret	Ret	6	10	15	Ret	DNA	DNA		DNA	3		5	15th
1981	(United Kingdom) Docking Spitzley Team Toleman	(Colombia) Ricardo Londoño							9	Ret	Ret	DNS	DNA			0	–
1981	(Italy) Sanremo Racing	(Italy) Guido Pardini		Ret	Ret	9	7	12	DNS	Ret	Ret	13	Ret	DNA		0	–
1981	(Switzerland) Formula Rennsport Club	(Switzerland) Fredy Schnarwiler	15	12	9	DNA	Ret	Ret		7	Ret	16	DNA	DNA		0	–
1982																	
1982	(Italy) Sanremo Racing	(Italy) Eddy Bianchi	Ret	14	8											0	–
1982	(Italy) Sanremo Racing	(Italy) Roberto Del Castello				DNS	Ret	10	Ret	14	Ret		10	9	11	3	16th
1982	(Switzerland) Formula Rennsport Club	(Switzerland) Fredy Schnarwiler	Ret	DNS												0	–
1983																	
1983	(Italy) Sanremo Racing	(Italy) Guido Daccò				Ret	6	Ret								4	13th

=== Docking Spitzley DS1 ===
Season	Team	Driver	1	2	3	4	5	6	7	8	9	10	11	12	13	Points	Pos.
1982																	
1982	(United Kingdom) Docking Spitzley Racing	(Italy) Carlo Rossi	Ret	Ret	Ret	12	Ret	DNQ	DNQ	Ret				Ret	12	0	–
1982	(United Kingdom) Docking Spitzley Racing	(Belgium) Thierry Tassin	DSQ	6	Ret	18	9	Ret	Ret	Ret					DNQ	1	17th
