= 1982 European Formula Two Championship =

Seasons
- ← 1981 1983 →

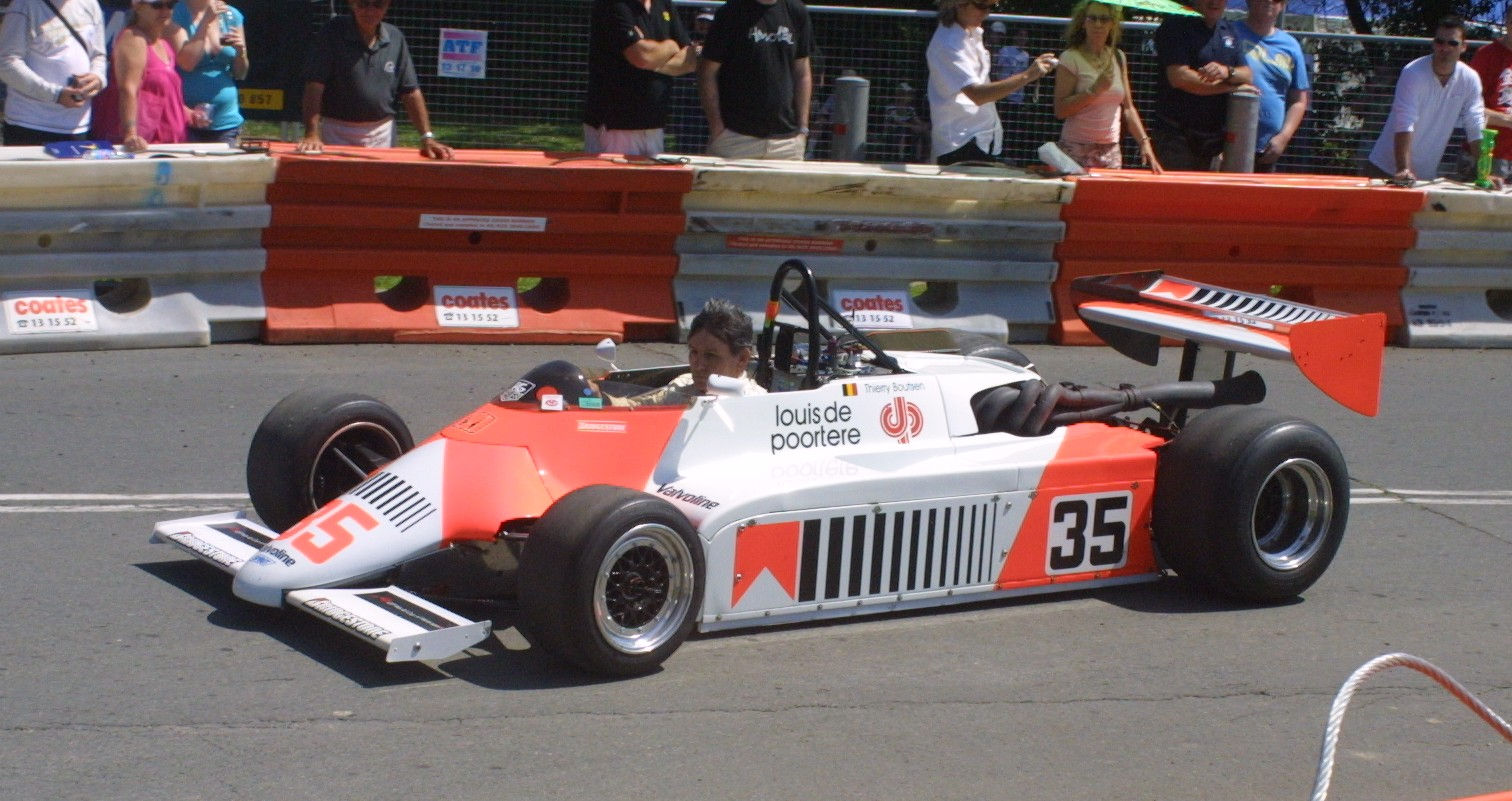
Thierry Boutsen's Spirit 201

The 1982 European Formula Two Championship was the sixteenth edition of the European Formula Two Championship, the main feeder series to Formula One. It was contested over 13 rounds and featured 22 different teams, 53 different drivers, seven different chassis and five different engines. Corrado Fabi won the championship in a works March-BMW after a season-long battle with teammate Johnny Cecotto and the Spirit-Honda of Thierry Boutsen.

== Teams and drivers ==
Team	Chassis	Engine	No.	Drivers	Rounds
(United Kingdom) Ralt Racing Ltd.	Ralt RH6/82	Honda	1	(United Kingdom) Kenny Acheson	All
(United Kingdom) Ralt Racing Ltd.	Ralt RH6/82	Honda	2	(United Kingdom) Jonathan Palmer	1–12
(United Kingdom) March Engineering	March 822	BMW	3	(Italy) Corrado Fabi	All
(United Kingdom) March Engineering	March 822	BMW	4	(Venezuela) Johnny Cecotto	All
(United Kingdom) March Engineering	March 822	BMW	5	(West Germany) Christian Danner	All
(West Germany) Maurer Motorsport	Maurer MM82	BMW	6	(Italy) Beppe Gabbiani	All
(West Germany) Maurer Motorsport	Maurer MM82	BMW	7	(West Germany) Stefan Bellof	All
(West Germany) Maurer Motorsport	Maurer MM82	BMW	8	(Austria) Peter Schindler	1–3
(West Germany) Maurer Motorsport	Maurer MM82	BMW	8	(Sweden) Eje Elgh	4
(West Germany) Maurer Motorsport	Maurer MM82	BMW	8	(France) Jean-Louis Schlesser	5–8,10–13
(West Germany) Maurer Motorsport	Maurer MM82	BMW	8	(France) Alain Ferté	9
(United Kingdom) Docking-Spitzley Racing	Docking-Spitzley DS1; Toleman (Lola) T850	Hart	9	(Italy) Carlo Rossi	1–8, 10, 12–13
(United Kingdom) Docking-Spitzley Racing	Docking-Spitzley DS1; Toleman (Lola) T850	Hart	10	(Belgium) Thierry Tassin	1–8, 10, 13
(Italy) Minardi Team Srl	Minardi Fly 281B	BMW	11	(Italy) Paolo Barilla	All
(Italy) Minardi Team Srl	Minardi Fly 281B	BMW	12	(Italy) Alessandro Nannini	All
(Italy) Minardi Team Srl	Minardi Fly 281B	BMW	14	(Italy) Siegfried Stohr	5
(Italy) Minardi Team Srl	Minardi Fly 281B	BMW	14	(Italy) "M. Arriva"	12
(Italy) Team Merzario	March-Merzario 282	BMW	16	(France) Richard Dallest	1–4
(Italy) Team Merzario	March-Merzario 282	BMW	16	(West Germany) Harald Brutschin	5–9
(Italy) Team Merzario	March-Merzario 282	BMW	16	(Italy) Guido Daccò	10–13
(Italy) Team Merzario	March-Merzario 282	BMW	17	(Austria) Jo Gartner	1–11
(Italy) Team Merzario	March-Merzario 282	BMW	17	(Italy) Roberto Campominsoni	12
(Italy) Team Merzario	March-Merzario 282	BMW	17	(Italy) Lamberto Leoni	13
(Italy) Team Merzario	March-Merzario 282	BMW	18	(Italy) Oscar Pedersoli	1-5, 7-13
(Switzerland) Horag Hotz Racing	March 822	BMW	19	(New Zealand) Mike Thackwell	1,4–10
(Switzerland) Horag Hotz Racing	March 822	BMW	19	(Sweden) Stanley Dickens	2
(Switzerland) Horag Hotz Racing	March 822	BMW	20	(West Germany) Henning Hagenbauer	9
(Switzerland) Horag Hotz Racing	March 822	BMW	42	(Sweden) Eje Elgh	11
(Italy) Sanremo Racing Srl	Toleman (Lola) T850; Toleman TG280	Hart	20	(Italy) Severo Zampatti	12–13
(Italy) Sanremo Racing Srl	Toleman (Lola) T850; Toleman TG280	Hart	21	(Italy) Eddy Bianchi	1–3
(Italy) Sanremo Racing Srl	Toleman (Lola) T850; Toleman TG280	Hart	21	(Italy) Piero Necchi	1–3
(Italy) Sanremo Racing Srl	Toleman (Lola) T850; Toleman TG280	Hart	22	(Italy) Roberto Del Castello	1–9, 11–13
(France) Ecurie Motul GPA Nogaro	AGS JH19; AGS JH18	BMW	23	(France) Philippe Streiff	All
(France) Ecurie Motul GPA Nogaro	AGS JH19; AGS JH18	BMW	24	(France) Pascal Fabre	All
(West Germany) Bertram Schäfer Racing	Maurer MM82; Ralt RT2	BMW	25	(West Germany) Frank Jelinski	All
(West Germany) Bertram Schäfer Racing	Maurer MM82; Ralt RT2	BMW	26	(Austria) "Pierre Chauvet"	1, 3, 5–10, 12–13
(West Germany) Bertram Schäfer Racing	Maurer MM82; Ralt RT2	BMW	26	(New Zealand) Mike Thackwell	2
(West Germany) Bertram Schäfer Racing	Maurer MM82; Ralt RT2	BMW	26	(Germany) Wolfgang Klein	4
(West Germany) Bertram Schäfer Racing	Maurer MM82; Ralt RT2	BMW	29	(Switzerland) Bruno Eichmann	9
(Switzerland) Formel Rennsport Club	Toleman (Lola) T850; March 822	Hart; BMW	27	(Switzerland) Fredy Schnarweiler	1–2, 13
(Italy) Brambilla Racing	Minardi GM75	BMW	28	(Italy) Guido Daccò	1–9
(Italy) Brambilla Racing	Minardi GM75	BMW	28	(Italy) Aldo Bertuzzi	10–11
(United Kingdom) Neil Trundle Racing	March 822	BMW	30	(United States) Cliff Hansen	7–13
(United Kingdom) Ray Mallock	Ralt RT4	Ford	31	(United Kingdom) Ray Mallock	1
(United Kingdom) Marlboro Team Spirit	Spirit 201	Honda	32	(Belgium) Thierry Boutsen	All
(United Kingdom) Marlboro Team Spirit	Spirit 201	Honda	33	(Sweden) Stefan Johansson	All
(Sweden) Strandel Motorsport	Toleman (Lola) T850; March 812	Hart; BMW	35	(Sweden) Tomas Kaiser	3, 5–6, 10
(Sweden) Strandel Motorsport	Toleman (Lola) T850; March 812	Hart; BMW	36	(Sweden) Tomas Kaiser	9, 11
(Sweden) Bo Martinsson	March 812	BMW	36	(Sweden) Bo Martinsson	1
(Japan) John Player Special Team Ikuzawa	March 812	Honda	37	(Japan) Satoru Nakajima	1, 5–6, 8–9
(Austria) Franz Konrad Racing	March 802; March 812	BMW	38	(Austria) Franz Konrad	1–4
(Austria) Franz Konrad Racing	March 802; March 812	BMW	39	(West Germany) Harald Brutschin	1–4
(West Germany) Gebhardt Motorsport	March 812	BMW	41	(West Germany) Günther Gebhardt	2, 4–5, 8–9
(Austria) Sewi Hopfer	Toleman TG280; Toleman (Lola) T850	Hart	42	(Austria) Sewi Hopfer	1–2, 4–5
(United Kingdom) Rick Whyman Racing (United Kingdom) Ebor Motorsport	Ralt RH6; Toleman TG280; March 802	Hart; BMW	44	(United Kingdom) Wyatt Stanley	1
(United Kingdom) Rick Whyman Racing (United Kingdom) Ebor Motorsport	Ralt RH6; Toleman TG280; March 802	Hart; BMW	44	(Austria) "Pierre Chauvet"	2
(United Kingdom) Rick Whyman Racing (United Kingdom) Ebor Motorsport	Ralt RH6; Toleman TG280; March 802	Hart; BMW	45	(West Germany) Peter Stürtz	2
(West Germany) Weigel Renntechnik	March 802	BMW	46	(France) Hubert Streibig	2
(United Kingdom) Caledon Coal Open Cast Racing	Ralt RT4	Ford	48	(United Kingdom) David Duffield	10

== Calendar ==
Race No	Circuit	Date	Laps	Distance	Time	Speed	Pole position	Fastest lap	Winner
1	(United Kingdom) Silverstone	21 March	47	4.719=221.793 km	1'11:51.38	185.197 km/h	(Sweden) Stefan Johansson	(West Germany) Christian Danner	(West Germany) Stefan Bellof
2	(West Germany) Hockenheim	4 April	30	6.789=203.67 km	1'03:03.44	193.795 km/h	(West Germany) Stefan Bellof	(West Germany) Stefan Bellof	(West Germany) Stefan Bellof
3	(United Kingdom) Thruxton	12 April	55	3.792=208.560 km	1'03:49.22	196.075 km/h	(Sweden) Stefan Johansson	(Venezuela) Johnny Cecotto	(Venezuela) Johnny Cecotto
4	(West Germany) Nürburgring (Eifelrennen)	25 April	9	22.835=205.515 km	1'05:01.37	189.640 km/h	(Belgium) Thierry Tassin	(West Germany) Stefan Bellof	(Belgium) Thierry Boutsen
5	(Italy) Mugello	9 May	42	5.245=220.290 km	1'14:32.79	177.304 km/h	(Sweden) Stefan Johansson	(Italy) Corrado Fabi	(Italy) Corrado Fabi
6	(Italy) Vallelunga	16 May	65	3.2=208.0 km	1'15:45.40	164.738 km/h	(Sweden) Stefan Johansson	(West Germany) Stefan Bellof	(Italy) Corrado Fabi
7	(France) Pau	31 May	73	2.834=206.882 km	1'31:00.03	136.398 km/h	(Belgium) Thierry Boutsen	(United Kingdom) Kenny Acheson	(Venezuela) Johnny Cecotto
8	(Belgium) Spa-Francorchamps	13 June	23	6.852=157.596 km	0'58:17.47	162.216 km/h	(Sweden) Stefan Johansson	(New Zealand) Mike Thackwell	(Belgium) Thierry Boutsen
9	(West Germany) Hockenheim	20 June	30	6.797=203.910 km	1'03:04.32	193.978 km/h	(Belgium) Thierry Boutsen	(Italy) Corrado Fabi	(Italy) Corrado Fabi
10	(United Kingdom) Donington Park	4 July	70	3.150=220.50 km	1'15:42.11	174.765 km/h	(United Kingdom) Jonathan Palmer	(Italy) Corrado Fabi	(Italy) Corrado Fabi
11	(Sweden) Mantorp Park	18 July	65	3.125=203.125 km	1'18:28.4	155.308 km/h	(Italy) Corrado Fabi	(Venezuela) Johnny Cecotto	(Venezuela) Johnny Cecotto
12	(Italy) Pergusa-Enna	1 August	45	4.95=222.75 km	1'09:22.15	192.665 km/h	(Belgium) Thierry Boutsen	(West Germany) Stefan Bellof	(Belgium) Thierry Boutsen
13	(Italy) Misano	8 August	60	3.488=209.28 km	1'18:25.19	160.123 km/h	(Italy) Corrado Fabi	(West Germany) Stefan Bellof	(Italy) Corrado Fabi

Note

The Spa race was originally scheduled over 30 laps, but was abandoned after 23 due to heavy rain. Full points were still awarded.

== Championship standings ==
Points were awarded to the top six classified finishers. The best nine results were counted for each driver, whilst other points scored outside their best nine results were discarded.

Points were awarded in the following system:

Position	1st	2nd	3rd	4th	5th	6th
Race	9	6	4	3	2	1

Discarded points finishes and total gross points scored are displayed in parentheses.

Pos.	Driver	SIL (United Kingdom)	HOC (West Germany)	THR (United Kingdom)	NÜR (West Germany)	MUG (Italy)	VLL (Italy)	PAU (France)	SPA (Belgium)	HOC (West Germany)	DON (United Kingdom)	MAN (Sweden)	PER (Italy)	MIS (Italy)	Points
1	(Italy) Corrado Fabi	Ret	3	Ret	2	1	1	Ret	5	1	1	**Ret**	Ret	**1**	57
2	(Venezuela) Johnny Cecotto	Ret	4	1	3	2	Ret	1	2	(6)	2	1	3	15	56 (57)
3	(Belgium) Thierry Boutsen	12	2	3	1	4	6	**2**	1	**Ret**	9	4	**1**	(6)	50 (51)
4	(West Germany) Stefan Bellof	1	**1**	Ret	5	7	Ret	NC	Ret	3	6	Ret	2	5	33
5	(Italy) Beppe Gabbiani	3	5	4	DNS	Ret	Ret	Ret	8	2	4	3	Ret	3	26
6	(France) Philippe Streiff	10	Ret	5	Ret	Ret	2	Ret	4	Ret	5	2	4	Ret	22
7	(United Kingdom) Kenny Acheson	Ret	13	2	4	6	14	5	10	11	10	Ret	Ret	Ret	12
8	(Sweden) Stefan Johansson	**Ret**	Ret	**14^{†}**	6	**3**	**4**	7	**Ret**	4	11	Ret	11^{†}	7	11
9	(United Kingdom) Jonathan Palmer	15	Ret	11	14	5	5	6	6	Ret	**3**	Ret	DNS		10
10	(Italy) Alessandro Nannini	5	9	12	8	10	Ret	DNQ	Ret	Ret	DSQ	Ret	Ret	2	8
11	(New Zealand) Mike Thackwell	Ret	Ret		Ret	8	9	3	3	10	Ret				8
12	(West Germany) Frank Jelinski	17^{†}	8	9	7	11	Ret	4	11	5	Ret	Ret	5	10	7
13	(Japan) Satoru Nakajima	2				15	Ret		13	8					6
14	(West Germany) Christian Danner	Ret	Ret	Ret	9	DNS	13	Ret	9	Ret	7	5	6	4	6
15	(France) Pascal Fabre	Ret	12^{†}	13	16	16^{†}	3	DNQ	19	Ret	Ret	6	8	9	5
16	(Italy) Roberto Del Castello	4	7	Ret	DNS	Ret	10	Ret	14	Ret		Ret	9	11	3
17	(Austria) Jo Gartner	6	Ret	10	Ret	Ret	7	Ret	15	7	Ret	Ret			1
18	(Belgium) Thierry Tassin	DSQ	6	Ret	**18**	9	Ret	Ret	Ret		Ret			DNQ	1
19	(France) Richard Dallest	DNS	Ret	6	Ret										1
-	(France) Jean-Louis Schlesser					14	Ret	8	7		8	7	Ret	Ret	0
-	(Italy) Paolo Barilla	7	Ret	7	15	Ret	11	DNQ	12	12	DSQ	Ret	Ret	8	0
-	(Italy) Guido Daccò	9	Ret	17	Ret	Ret	DNQ	DNPQ	18	13	12	8	7	13	0
-	(Austria) "Pierre Chauvet"	13	11	15		Ret	8	DNPQ	16	9	14^{†}		Ret	Ret	0
-	(Austria) Peter Schindler	8	Ret	Ret											0
-	(Italy) Eddy Bianchi	Ret	Ret	8											0
-	(United States) Cliff Hansen							Ret	Ret	NC	15	9	13	Ret	0
-	(West Germany) Günther Gebhardt		10		10	Ret			DNQ	Ret					0
-	(Italy) Roberto Campominsoni												10		0
-	(Austria) Franz Konrad	14^{†}	Ret	16	11										0
-	(United Kingdom) Ray Mallock	11													0
-	(Italy) Carlo Rossi	Ret	Ret	Ret	12	Ret	DNQ	DNQ	Ret		13		Ret	12	0
-	(Italy) Piero Necchi				DNS	12	12	Ret	Ret	Ret					0
-	(Italy) Severo Zampatti												12	DNQ	0
-	(West Germany) Harald Brutschin	18^{†}	Ret	Ret	13	13	DNQ	DNQ	17	Ret					0
-	(Switzerland) Bruno Eichmann									14^{†}					0
-	(Italy) Lamberto Leoni													14	0
-	(Sweden) Tomas Kaiser			NC		DNS	DNQ			15	Ret	Ret			0
-	(Sweden) Bo Martinsson	16													0
-	(Sweden) Eje Elgh				17^{†}							Ret			0
-	(Switzerland) Fredy Schnarweiler	Ret	DNS											NC	0
-	(Italy) Oscar Pedersoli	Ret	Ret	Ret	DNS	Ret		Ret	Ret	Ret	Ret	Ret	Ret	Ret	0
-	(Austria) Sewi Hopfer	DNS	DNQ		Ret	DNS									0
-	(United Kingdom) Wyatt Stanley	Ret													0
-	(Sweden) Stanley Dickens		Ret												0
-	(West Germany) Peter Stürtz		Ret												0
-	(France) Hubert Streibig		Ret												0
-	(West Germany) Wolfgang Klein				Ret										0
-	(Italy) Siegfried Stohr					Ret									0
-	(West Germany) Henning Hagenbauer									Ret					0
-	(France) Alain Ferté									Ret					0
-	(United Kingdom) David Duffield										DNS				0
-	(Italy) "M. Arriva"												DSQ		0
-	(Italy) Aldo Bertuzzi										DNQ	DNQ			0

Key
Colour	Result
Gold	Winner
Silver	Second place
Bronze	Third place
Green	Other points position
Blue	Other classified position
Blue	Not classified, finished (NC)
Purple	Not classified, retired (Ret)
Red	Did not qualify (DNQ)
Red	Did not pre-qualify (DNPQ)
Black	Disqualified (DSQ)
White	Did not start (DNS)
White	Race cancelled (C)
Blank	Did not practice (DNP)
Blank	Excluded (EX)
Blank	Did not arrive (DNA)
Blank	Withdrawn (WD)
Blank	Did not enter (cell empty)
Text formatting	Meaning
**Bold**	Pole position
Italics	Fastest lap

Notes:

- † – Drivers did not finish the Grand Prix, but were classified as they completed more than 87.5% of the race distance.

== Complete overview ==
first column of every race	10	= grid position

second column of every race	10	= race result

R = retired, Rx = retired but classified (placing denoted by x), NC = not classified, NS = did not start, NQ = did not qualify, NPQ = did not pre-qualify, DIS = disqualified (if after race, placing beforehand displayed alongside in parentheses)

Pos	Driver	Team	Chassis	Engine	SIL (United Kingdom)		HOC (West Germany)		THR (United Kingdom)		NÜR (West Germany)		MUG (Italy)		VLL (Italy)		PAU (France)		SPA (Belgium)		HOC (West Germany)		DON (United Kingdom)		MAN (Sweden)		PER (Italy)		MIS (Italy)	
1	(Italy) Corrado Fabi	March Racing	March	BMW	7	R	6	3	2	R20	7	2	12	1	2	1		R		5		1		1	1	R		1	1	1
2	(Venezuela) Johnny Cecotto	March Racing	March	BMW	2	R	10	4	3	1	13	3	20	2	13	R		1		2		6		2		1		3		15
3	(Belgium) Thierry Boutsen	Team Spirit	Spirit	Honda	5	12	2	2	7	3	2	1	15	4	4	6	1	2		1	1	R		9		4	1	1		6
4	(West Germany) Stefan Bellof	Maurer Motorsport	Maurer	BMW	9	1	1	1	6	R	4	5	4	7	3	R		9		R		3		6		R		2		5
5	(Italy) Beppe Gabbiani	Maurer Motorsport	Maurer	BMW	16	3	14	5	11	4	10	NS	7	R	8	R		R		8		2		4		3		R		3
6	(France) Philippe Streiff	Motul GPA	AGS	BMW	11	10	11	R	17	5	11	R	8	R	5	2		R		4		R16		5		2		4		R
7	(United Kingdom) Kenny Acheson	Ralt Racing Ltd.	Ralt	Honda	14	R	19	13	10	2	9	4	2	6	7	14		6		14		5		10		R		R		R
8	(Sweden) Stefan Johansson	Team Spirit	Spirit	Honda	1	R	5	R	1	14	6	6	1	3	1	4		7	1	R		4		11		R		R11		7
9	(United Kingdom) Jonathan Palmer	Ralt Racing Ltd.	Ralt	Honda	24	15	4	R	5	11	5	14	3	5	11	5		6		6		R	1	3		R		NS	–	–
10	(New Zealand) Mike Thackwell	Horag Racing	March	BMW	18	R			–	–	15	R	6	8	10	9		3		3		10		R	–	–	–	–	–	–
10	(New Zealand) Mike Thackwell	Bertram Schäfer Racing	Maurer	BMW			13	R																						
	(Italy) Alessandro Nannini	Minardi	Minardi	BMW	15	5	27	9	9	12	12	8	5	R10	12	R		NQ		R		R		DIS		R		R		2
12	(West Germany) Frank Jelinski	Bertram Schäfer Racing	Maurer	BMW	4	R17	16	8	16	9	19	7	28	11	16	R		4		11		5		R		R		5		10
13	(Japan) Satoru Nakajima	John Player Special Team Ikuzawa	March	Honda	17	2	–	–	–	–	–	–	10	15						13		8	–	–	–	–	–	–	–	–
13	(Japan) Satoru Nakajima	John Player Special Team Ikuzawa	March	BMW											21	R	–	–												
	(West Germany) Christian Danner	March Racing	March	BMW	10	R	3	R	4	R	28	9	13	NS	20	13		R		9		R		7		5		6		4
15	(France) Pascal Fabre	Motul GPA	AGS	BMW	20	R	9	12	19	13	14	16	16	R16	9	3		NQ		19		R		R		6		8		9
16	(Italy) Roberto Del Castello	San Remo Racing	Toleman	BMW	8	4	12	7	18	R	29	NS	24	R	19	10	–	–		14		R	–	–		10		9		11
17	(Austria) Jo Gartner	Team Merzario	Merzario-March	BMW	25	6	7	R	8	10	3	R	9	R	6	7	–	–		15		7		R		R	–	–	–	–
	(Belgium) Thierry Tassin	Docking Spitzley	Docking Spitzley -Toleman	Hart	6	DIS(2)	8	6	21	R	1	18	11	9	18	R	–	–		R	–	–		R	–	–	–	–		NQ
	(France) Richard Dallest	Team Merzario	Merzario-March	BMW	32	NS	29	R	13	6	8	R	–	–	–	–	–	–	–	–	–	–	–	–	–	–	–	–	–	–
–	(France) Jean-Louis Schlesser	Maurer Motorsport	Maurer	BMW	–	–	–	–	–	–	–	–	26	14	15	R		8		7	–	–		8		7		R14		R
–	(Italy) Paolo Barilla	Minardi	Minardi	BMW	13	7	17	R	14	7	17	NS	14	R	17	11		NQ		12		12		DIS		R		R		8
–	(Italy) Guido Daccò	Brambilla Racing	Minardi	BMW	28	9	24	R	23	17	24	R	27	R	23	NQ		NPQ		18		13								
–	(Italy) Guido Daccò	Team Merzario	Merzario-March	BMW																				12		8		7		13
–	(Austria) Pierre Chauvet	Bertram Schäfer Racing	Maurer	BMW	19	13			25	15	–	–	23	R	22	8		NRQ		16		9		R14	–	–		R		R
–	(Austria) Pierre Chauvet	Ebor Motorsport	Ralt	Hart			22	11																						
–	(Italy) Eddy Bianchi	San Remo Racing	Toleman	BMW	27	R																								
–	(Italy) Eddy Bianchi	San Remo Racing	Toleman	Hart			25	R14	15	8	–	–	–	–	–	–	–	–	–	–	–	–	–	–	–	–	–	–	–	–
–	(Austria) Peter Schindler	Maurer Motorsport	Maurer	BMW	12	8	18	R	12	R18	–	–	–	–	–	–	–	–	–	–	–	–	–	–	–	–	–	–	–	–
–	(United States) Cliff Hansen	Neil Trundle Racing	March	BMW	–	–	–	–	–	–	–	–	–	–	–	–		R		R		17		15		9		13		R
–	(West Germany) Günther Gebhardt	Gebhardt Motorsport	March	BMW	–	–	23	10	–	–	18	10	25	R	–	–	–	–		NQ		R	–	–	–	–	–	–	–	–
–	(Italy) Roberto Campominosi	Team Merzario	Merzario-March	BMW	–	–	–	–	–	–	–	–	–	–	–	–	–	–	–	–	–	–	–	–	–	–		10	–	–
–	(Austria) Franz Konrad	Konrad Racing	March	BMW	29	R14	30	R	26	16	16	11	–	–	–	–	–	–	–	–	–	–	–	–	–	–	–	–	–	–
–	(United Kingdom) Ray Mallock	?	Ralt	Ford	22	11	–	–	–	–	–	–	–	–	–	–	–	–	–	–	–	–	–	–	–	–	–	–	–	–
–	(Italy) Carlo Rossi	Docking Spitzley	Docking Spitzley -Toleman	Hart	3	R	20	R	20	R	20	12	21	R	25	NQ		NQ		R	–	–		13	–	–		R		12
–	(Italy) Piero Necchi	San Remo Racing	Toleman	Hart	–	–	–	–	–	–	26	NS	17	12	14	12		R		R		R	–	–	–	–	–	–	–	–
–	(Italy) Severino Zampatti	San Remo Racing	Toleman	BMW	–	–	–	–	–	–	–	–	–	–	–	–	–	–	–	–	–	–	–	–	–	–		12		NQ
–	(West Germany) Harald Brutschin	Konrad Racing	March	BMW	23	R18	28	R	24	R	22	13																		
–	(West Germany) Harald Brutschin	Team Merzario	Merzario-March	BMW									22	13	24	NQ		NQ		17		R	–	–	–	–	–	–	–	–
–	(Switzerland) Bruno Eichmann	Bertram Schäfer Racing	Ralt	BMW	–	–	–	–	–	–	–	–	–	–	–	–	–	–	–	–		R14	–	–	–	–	–	–	–	–
–	(Italy) Lamberto Leoni	Team Merzario	Merzario-March	BMW	–	–	–	–	–	–	–	–	–	–	–	–	–	–	–	–	–	–	–	–	–	–	–	–		14
–	(Sweden) Tomas Kaiser	Strandel Motorsport	Toleman	Hart	–	–	–	–	27	21	–	–			26	NQ	–	–	–	–										
–	(Sweden) Tomas Kaiser	Strandel Motorsport	March	BMW									30	NS								15		R		R	–	–	–	–
–	(Sweden) Bo Martinsson	?	March	BMW	21	16	–	–	–	–	–	–	–	–	–	–	–	–	–	–	–	–	–	–	–	–	–	–	–	–
–	(Sweden) Eje Elgh	Maurer Motorsport	Maurer	BMW	–	–	–	–	–	–	21	R17	–	–	–	–	–	–	–	–	–	–	–	–						
–	(Sweden) Eje Elgh	Horag Racing	March	BMW																						R	–	–	–	–
–	(Italy) Oscar Pedersoli	Team Merzario	Merzario-March	BMW	26	R	21	R	22	R19	25	NS	18	R	–	–		R		R		R		R		R		R		R
–	(Switzerland) Freddy Schmarwiler	Formel Rennsport Club	Lola	Hart	30	R	26	NS	–	–	–	–	–	–	–	–	–	–	–	–	–	–	–	–	–	–	–	–		
–	(Switzerland) Freddy Schmarwiler	Formel Rennsport Club	March	BMW																										NC
–	(Austria) Sewi Hopfer	?	Toleman	Hart	33	NS	33	NQ	–	–	27	R	29	NS	–	–	–	–	–	–	–	–	–	–	–	–	–	–	–	–
–	(United Kingdom) Wyatt Stanley	Ebor Motorsport	Ralt	Hart	31	R	–	–	–	–	–	–	–	–	–	–	–	–	–	–	–	–	–	–	–	–	–	–	–	–
–	(Sweden) Stanley Dickens	Horag Racing	March	BMW	–	–	15	R	–	–	–	–	–	–	–	–	–	–	–	–	–	–	–	–	–	–	–	–	–	–
–	(France) Hubert Striebig	WRT Racing	March	BMW	–	–	31	R	–	–	–	–	–	–	–	–	–	–	–	–	–	–	–	–	–	–	–	–	–	–
–	(West Germany) Peter Stürtz	Ebor Motorsport	March	BMW	–	–	32	R	–	–	–	–	–	–	–	–	–	–	–	–	–	–	–	–	–	–	–	–	–	–
–	(West Germany) Wolfgang Klein	Bertram Schäfer Racing	Maurer	BMW	–	–	–	–	–	–	23	R	–	–	–	–	–	–	–	–	–	–	–	–	–	–	–	–	–	–
–	(Italy) Siegfried Stohr	Minardi	Minardi	Ferrari	–	–	–	–	–	–	–	–	19	R	–	–	–	–	–	–	–	–	–	–	–	–	–	–	–	–
–	(West Germany) Henning Hagenbauer	Horag Racing	March	BMW	–	–	–	–	–	–	–	–	–	–	–	–	–	–	–	–		R	–	–	–	–	–	–	–	–
–	(France) Alain Ferté	Maurer Motorsport	Maurer	BMW	–	–	–	–	–	–	–	–	–	–	–	–	–	–	–	–		R	–	–	–	–	–	–	–	–
–	(Italy) Mister Arriva	Minardi	Minardi	BMW	–	–	–	–	–	–	–	–	–	–	–	–	–	–	–	–	–	–	–	–	–	–		R	–	–
–	(United Kingdom) David Duffield	Caledon Coal Open Cast	Ralt	Ford	–	–	–	–	–	–	–	–	–	–	–	–	–	–	–	–	–	–		NS	–	–	–	–	–	–
–	(Italy) Aldo Bertuzzi	Brambilla Racing	Minardi	BMW	–	–	–	–	–	–	–	–	–	–	–	–	–	–	–	–	–	–		NQ		NQ	–	–	–	–
