= 1983 Gran Premio de Madrid =

1983 Madrid Grand Prix
- Circuito Permanente del Jarama (1980-1989)

Race details
- Date: 12 June 1983
- Official name: V Gran Premio de Madrid
- Location: Circuito Permanente del Jarama, Madrid
- Course: Permanent racing facility
- Course length: 3.312 km (2.060 miles)
- Distance: 65 laps, 215.280 km (133.900 miles)

Pole position
Driver	(United Kingdom) Jonathan Palmer	Ralt-Honda
- Time: 1:16.79

Fastest lap
Driver	(New Zealand) Mike Thackwell	Ralt-Honda
- Time: 1:20.02

Podium
First	(New Zealand) Mike Thackwell	Ralt-Honda
Second	(West Germany) Stefan Bellof	Maurer-BMW
Third	(United Kingdom) Jonathan Palmer	Ralt-Honda

The fifth Gran Premio de Madrid, was the seventh round of the 1983 European Championship for F2 Drivers. This was held at Circuito Permanente del Jarama, north of the Spanish capital, Madrid, on 12 June. This was first time the race was held since 1971.

== Report ==
=== Entry ===
A total of 26 F2 cars were entered for the event, however of which 23 took part in qualifying.

=== Qualifying ===
Jonathan Palmer took pole position for Ralt Racing Ltd, in their Ralt-Honda RH6/83H, averaging a speed of 99.031 mph.

=== Race ===
The race was held over 65 laps of a Jarama circuit. Mike Thackwell took the winner spoils for works Ralt team, driving their Ralt-Honda RH6/83H. Thackwell won in a time of 1hr 28:50.80mins., averaging a speed of 92.737 mph. Around 2.36 seconds behind was the second place car, driven by Stefan Bellof, for the Maurer Motorsport team in their own BMW-engined MM83. The podium was completed by the second works Ralt, of Jonathan Palmer.

== Classification ==
=== Race result ===
Pos.	No.	Driver	Entrant	Car - Engine	Time, Laps	Reason Out
1st	9	(New Zealand) Mike Thackwell	Ralt Racing Ltd	Ralt-Honda RH6/83H	1hr 28:50.80	
2nd	4	(West Germany) Stefan Bellof	Maurer Motorsport	Maurer-BMW MM83	1hr 28:53.16	
3rd	9	(United Kingdom) Jonathan Palmer	Ralt Racing Ltd	Ralt-Honda RH6/83H	1hr 29:06.29	
4th	7	(France) Philippe Streiff	Equipe Armagnac Bigorre Nogaro	AGS-BMW JH19B	1hr 29:25.62	
5th	5	(France) Alain Ferté	Maurer Motorsport	Maurer-BMW MM83	1hr29:29.99	
6th	27	(Argentina) Enrique Mansilla	James Gresham Racing	March-BMW 832	1hr 29:43.15	
7th	1	(Italy) Beppe Gabbiani	Onyx Race Engineering	March-BMW 832	1hr 29:59.20	
8th	22	(France) Richard Dallest	Merzario Team Srl	Merzario-BMW M28	1hr 30:06.30	
9th	2	(West Germany) Christian Danner	Onyx Race Engineering	March-BMW 832	1hr 29:59.20	
10th	12	(Switzerland) Rolf Biland	Schweizer Automobil Rennsport	March-BMW 832	64	
11th	34	(Italy) Roberto Del Castello	Mint Engineering	March-BMW 832	63	
12th	36	(Italy) Fulvio Ballabio	Equipe Armagnac Bigorre Nogaro	AGS-BMW JH19	63	
13th	11	(Spain) Emilio de Villota	Minardi Team Srl	Minardi-BMW M283	62	Accident
14th	3	(Belgium) Patrick Nève	Onyx Race Engineering	March-BMW 832	62	
15th	18	(Italy) Aldo Bertuzzi	Sanremo Racing Srl	March-BMW 832	62	
16th	33	(United Kingdom) Dave Scott	Mint Engineering	March-BMW 832	60	Engine
17th	24	(Austria) Jo Gartner	Emco Sport	Spirit-BMW 201	58	
DNF	16	(Italy) Guido Daccò	Sanremo Racing Srl	March-BMW 832	56	Engine
DNF	25	(Austria) "Pierre Chauvet"	Emco Sport	Spirit-BMW 201	47	Accident
DNF	6	(France) Pierre Petit	Maurer Motorsport	Maurer-BMW MM83	37	Accident
DNF	17	(United Kingdom) Kenny Acheson	Maurer Motorsport	Maurer-BMW MM81	27	Accident
DNF	10	(Italy) Alessandro Nannini	Minardi Team Srl	Minardi-BMW M283	25	Throttle linkage
DNF	26	(France) Philippe Alliot	BMW France	Martini-BMW 792	11	Wheel bearing

- Fastest lap: Mike Thackwell, 1:10.02ecs. (108.65 mph)
