= 1985 1000 km of Spa =

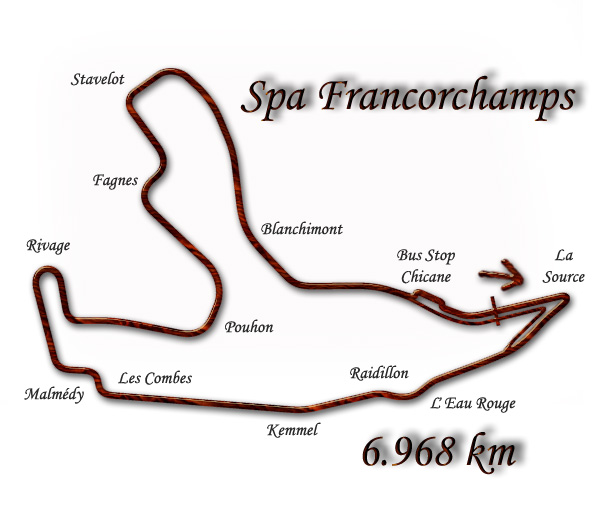
Layout of the Circuit de Spa-Francorchamps (1981–1993, 1995–2003)

The 1985 1000 km Spa was the seventh round of the 1985 World Endurance Championship. It took place at the Circuit de Spa-Francorchamps, Belgium on September 1, 1985. In the first half of the race the two leading drivers collided, which resulted in the death of defending Drivers Champion Stefan Bellof. The race organisers ended the race early, thus allowing the Martini Racing Lancia of drivers Mauro Baldi, Bob Wollek, and Riccardo Patrese to win their only victory of the year. It was also the last victory scored by the Lancia LC2.

== Bellof accident ==
The 1000 km of Spa was held only three weeks after Manfred Winkelhock was killed in an accident at the series' previous round, the 1000 km of Mosport. Halfway through the race, defending Drivers Champion Stefan Bellof in the Brun Motorsport Porsche 956 was battling for the race lead with 1982 and 1983 Drivers Champion Jacky Ickx in the Rothmans Porsche 962C. Ickx led Bellof out of the La Source hairpin and down the front stretch into the Eau Rouge corner, starting the 78th lap of the race. Both drivers had only just been handed their cars from their teammates during a pit stop five laps earlier.

Entering the left kink at the bottom of the hill, Bellof moved to the left of Ickx in an attempt to set up a pass for the immediate right-hander up the hill. Bellof's right front came into contact with Ickx's left rear, and both drivers spun up to the left up the hill, impacting the barriers. Ickx's car hit the wall on the right rear side, while Bellof went straight into the barriers, breaking through and hitting a secondary wall. Bellof's Porsche caught fire moments after the wreck. Ickx, able to climb from his car, attempted to aid safety workers in helping Bellof. During the caution period, members of the Brun team also arrived to aid in the rescue.

Although the fire was extinguished and the driver extracted from the wreckage within forty minutes, Stefan Bellof was pronounced dead only ten minutes later after he had reached the track hospital, although it was believed that he had actually died on impact. Out of respect for Bellof, the race organisers chose to end the event earlier than planned. The entire incident was recorded on an in-car camera that Ickx's 962C was carrying. Even after the accident, the camera continued to work, and was pointed in the direction of Bellof's wreckage.

== Official results ==
Class winners in bold. Cars failing to complete 90% of the winner's distance marked as Not Classified (NC).

| Pos | Class | No | Team | Drivers | Chassis | Tyre | Laps |
| Pos | Class | No | Team | Drivers | Engine | Tyre | Laps |
|---|---|---|---|---|---|---|---|
| 1 | **C1** | **5** | **(Italy) Martini Racing** | **(Italy) Mauro Baldi (France) Bob Wollek (Italy) Riccardo Patrese** | **Lancia LC2** | **MI** | **122** |
| 1 | **C1** | **5** | **(Italy) Martini Racing** | **(Italy) Mauro Baldi (France) Bob Wollek (Italy) Riccardo Patrese** | **Ferrari 308C 3.0 L Turbo V8** | **MI** | **122** |
| 2 | C1 | 2 | (Germany) Rothmans Porsche | (Germany) Hans-Joachim Stuck (United Kingdom) Derek Bell | Porsche 956 | **D** | 122 |
| 2 | C1 | 2 | (Germany) Rothmans Porsche | (Germany) Hans-Joachim Stuck (United Kingdom) Derek Bell | Porsche Type-935 2.6 L Turbo Flat-6 | **D** | 122 |
| 3 | C1 | 7 | (Germany) Joest Racing | (Germany) Klaus Ludwig (Italy) Paolo Barilla | Porsche 956B | **D** | 121 |
| 3 | C1 | 7 | (Germany) Joest Racing | (Germany) Klaus Ludwig (Italy) Paolo Barilla | Porsche Type-935 2.6 L Turbo Flat-6 | **D** | 121 |
| 4 | C1 | 4 | (Italy) Martini Racing | (Italy) Riccardo Patrese (Italy) Alessandro Nannini | Lancia LC2 | **MI** | 121 |
| 4 | C1 | 4 | (Italy) Martini Racing | (Italy) Riccardo Patrese (Italy) Alessandro Nannini | Ferrari 308C 3.0 L Turbo V8 | **MI** | 121 |
| 5 | C1 | 51 | (United Kingdom) TWR Jaguar | (United Kingdom) Martin Brundle (New Zealand) Mike Thackwell | Jaguar XJR-6 | **D** | 120 |
| 5 | C1 | 51 | (United Kingdom) TWR Jaguar | (United Kingdom) Martin Brundle (New Zealand) Mike Thackwell | Jaguar 6.0 L V12 | **D** | 120 |
| 6 | C1 | 8 | (Germany) Joest Racing | (Germany) Volker Weidler (Germany) "John Winter" (Belgium) Marc Duez | Porsche 956 | **D** | 120 |
| 6 | C1 | 8 | (Germany) Joest Racing | (Germany) Volker Weidler (Germany) "John Winter" (Belgium) Marc Duez | Porsche Type-935 2.6 L Turbo Flat-6 | **D** | 120 |
| 7 | C1 | 34 | (United Kingdom) Cosmik Racing | (Germany) Christian Danner (Greece) Costas Los | March 84G | **Y** | 114 |
| 7 | C1 | 34 | (United Kingdom) Cosmik Racing | (Germany) Christian Danner (Greece) Costas Los | Porsche Type-956 2.6 L Turbo Flat-6 | **Y** | 114 |
| 8 | C1 | 26 | (Germany) Obermaier Racing Team | (Germany) Jürgen Lässig (Spain) Jesús Pareja (Belgium) Hervé Regout | Porsche 956 | **G** | 113 |
| 8 | C1 | 26 | (Germany) Obermaier Racing Team | (Germany) Jürgen Lässig (Spain) Jesús Pareja (Belgium) Hervé Regout | Porsche Type-935 2.6 L Turbo Flat-6 | **G** | 113 |
| 9 | **C2** | **70** | **(United Kingdom) Spice Engineering** | **(United Kingdom) Gordon Spice (United Kingdom) Ray Bellm** | **Spice-Tiga GC85** | **A** | **112** |
| 9 | **C2** | **70** | **(United Kingdom) Spice Engineering** | **(United Kingdom) Gordon Spice (United Kingdom) Ray Bellm** | **Ford Cosworth DFL 3.3 L V8** | **A** | **112** |
| 10 | C1 | 24 | Cheetah Automobiles Switzerland | (Belgium) Bernard de Dryver (Belgium) Pierre Dieudonné (Belgium) Claude Bourgoignie | Cheetah G604 | **D** | 110 |
| 10 | C1 | 24 | Cheetah Automobiles Switzerland | (Belgium) Bernard de Dryver (Belgium) Pierre Dieudonné (Belgium) Claude Bourgoignie | Aston Martin-Tickford 5.3 L V8 | **D** | 110 |
| 11 | C1 | 10 | (Germany) Porsche Kremer Racing | (Netherlands) Kees Kroesemeijer (Switzerland) Marc Surer | Porsche 956 | **G** | 108 |
| 11 | C1 | 10 | (Germany) Porsche Kremer Racing | (Netherlands) Kees Kroesemeijer (Switzerland) Marc Surer | Porsche Type-935 2.6 L Turbo Flat-6 | **G** | 108 |
| 12 | C2 | 74 | (Germany) Gebhardt Motorsport | (Sweden) Stanley Dickens (Germany) Frank Jelinski (Canada) John Graham | Gebhardt JC853 | **A** | 108 |
| 12 | C2 | 74 | (Germany) Gebhardt Motorsport | (Sweden) Stanley Dickens (Germany) Frank Jelinski (Canada) John Graham | Ford Cosworth DFV 3.0 L V8 | **A** | 108 |
| 13 | C2 | 90 | Jens Winther Denmark | (Denmark) Jens Winther (United Kingdom) David Mercer | URD C83 | **A** | 108 |
| 13 | C2 | 90 | Jens Winther Denmark | (Denmark) Jens Winther (United Kingdom) David Mercer | BMW M88 3.5 L I6 | **A** | 108 |
| 14 | C2 | 79 | (United Kingdom) Ecurie Ecosse | (United Kingdom) Mike Wilds (United Kingdom) David Leslie | Ecosse C285 | **A** | 99 |
| 14 | C2 | 79 | (United Kingdom) Ecurie Ecosse | (United Kingdom) Mike Wilds (United Kingdom) David Leslie | Ford Cosworth DFV 3.0 L V8 | **A** | 99 |
| 15 | C2 | 82 | (Italy) Grifo Autoracing | (Italy) Pasquale Barberio (Italy) Maurizio Gellini | Alba AR3 | **D** | 98 |
| 15 | C2 | 82 | (Italy) Grifo Autoracing | (Italy) Pasquale Barberio (Italy) Maurizio Gellini | Ford Cosworth DFL 3.3 L V8 | **D** | 98 |
| 16 | C2 | 88 | (United Kingdom) Ark Racing | (United Kingdom) David Andrews (United Kingdom) Max Payne (United Kingdom) Chris Ashmore | Ceekar 83J | **A** | 94 |
| 16 | C2 | 88 | (United Kingdom) Ark Racing | (United Kingdom) David Andrews (United Kingdom) Max Payne (United Kingdom) Chris Ashmore | Ford Cosworth BDX 2.0 L I4 | **A** | 94 |
| 17 | C2 | 95 | (France) Roland Bassaler | (France) Roland Bassaler (France) Dominique Lacaud (France) Gérard Tremblay | Sauber SHS C6 | **A** | 94 |
| 17 | C2 | 95 | (France) Roland Bassaler | (France) Roland Bassaler (France) Dominique Lacaud (France) Gérard Tremblay | BMW M88 3.5 L I6 | **A** | 94 |
| 18 | C2 | 105 | (Denmark) Jens Nakjaer | (Denmark) Jens Nakjaer (Denmark) Holger Knudsen | Nakjaer | **A** | 91 |
| 18 | C2 | 105 | (Denmark) Jens Nakjaer | (Denmark) Jens Nakjaer (Denmark) Holger Knudsen | BMW 3.2 L I6 | **A** | 91 |
| 19 | C2 | 98 | (United Kingdom) Roy Baker Promotions | (United Kingdom) Paul Smith (United Kingdom) Mike Kimpton | Tiga GC285 | **A** | 88 |
| 19 | C2 | 98 | (United Kingdom) Roy Baker Promotions | (United Kingdom) Paul Smith (United Kingdom) Mike Kimpton | Ford Cosworth BDT 1.8 L Turbo I4 | **A** | 88 |
| 20 | **GTX** | **160** | **(Italy) Victor Racing Team** | **(Italy) "Victor" (Italy) Toni Palma (Italy) Luigi Taverna** | **Porsche 935** | ? | **87** |
| 20 | **GTX** | **160** | **(Italy) Victor Racing Team** | **(Italy) "Victor" (Italy) Toni Palma (Italy) Luigi Taverna** | **Porsche Type-930 3.1 L Turbo Flat-6** | ? | **87** |
| 21 | C1 | 13 | (France) Primagaz Team Cougar | (France) Henri Pescarolo (France) Yves Courage | Cougar C12S | **MI** | 87 |
| 21 | C1 | 13 | (France) Primagaz Team Cougar | (France) Henri Pescarolo (France) Yves Courage | Porsche Type-935 2.6 L Flat-6 | **MI** | 87 |
| 22 NC | B | 158 | (Germany) Dieter Oster | (Germany) Jürgen Hammelmann (Belgium) Jean-Paul Libert (Italy) Marco Micangeli | BMW M1 | **D** | 71 |
| 22 NC | B | 158 | (Germany) Dieter Oster | (Germany) Jürgen Hammelmann (Belgium) Jean-Paul Libert (Italy) Marco Micangeli | BMW M88 3.5 L I6 | **D** | 71 |
| 23 NC | C2 | 93 | (France) Automobiles Louis Descartes | (France) Louis Descartes (France) Jacques Heuclin | ALD 01 | **A** | 63 |
| 23 NC | C2 | 93 | (France) Automobiles Louis Descartes | (France) Louis Descartes (France) Jacques Heuclin | BMW M88 3.5 L I6 | **A** | 63 |
| 24 DNF | C2 | 80 | (Italy) Carma F.F. | (Italy) Carlo Facetti (Italy) Martino Finotto (Italy) Almo Coppelli | Alba AR6 | **A** | 95 |
| 24 DNF | C2 | 80 | (Italy) Carma F.F. | (Italy) Carlo Facetti (Italy) Martino Finotto (Italy) Almo Coppelli | Carma FF 1.9 L Turbo I4 | **A** | 95 |
| 25 DNF | C1 | 1 | (Germany) Rothmans Porsche | (Germany) Jochen Mass (Belgium) Jacky Ickx | Porsche 962C | **D** | 77 |
| 25 DNF | C1 | 1 | (Germany) Rothmans Porsche | (Germany) Jochen Mass (Belgium) Jacky Ickx | Porsche Type-935 2.6 L Turbo Flat-6 | **D** | 77 |
| 26 DNF | C1 | 19 | (Switzerland) Brun Motorsport | (Germany) Stefan Bellof (Belgium) Thierry Boutsen | Porsche 956B | **D** | 77 |
| 26 DNF | C1 | 19 | (Switzerland) Brun Motorsport | (Germany) Stefan Bellof (Belgium) Thierry Boutsen | Porsche Type-935 2.6 L Turbo Flat-6 | **D** | 77 |
| 27 DNF | C1 | 18 | (Switzerland) Brun Motorsport | (Argentina) Oscar Larrauri (Italy) Massimo Sigala | Porsche 956 | **D** | 70 |
| 27 DNF | C1 | 18 | (Switzerland) Brun Motorsport | (Argentina) Oscar Larrauri (Italy) Massimo Sigala | Porsche Type-935 2.6 L Turbo Flat-6 | **D** | 70 |
| 28 DNF | C2 | 99 | (United Kingdom) Roy Baker Promotions | (United Kingdom) Jeremy Rossiter (Denmark) Thorkild Thyrring | Tiga GC284 | **A** | 53 |
| 28 DNF | C2 | 99 | (United Kingdom) Roy Baker Promotions | (United Kingdom) Jeremy Rossiter (Denmark) Thorkild Thyrring | Ford Cosworth BDT 1.8 L Turbo I4 | **A** | 53 |
| 29 DNF | C2 | 97 | (Sweden) Strandell Motors | (Sweden) Anders Olofsson (Sweden) Tryggve Gronvall | Strandell 85 | **A** | 38 |
| 29 DNF | C2 | 97 | (Sweden) Strandell Motors | (Sweden) Anders Olofsson (Sweden) Tryggve Gronvall | Porsche Type-934 3.3 L Turbo Flat-6 | **A** | 38 |
| 30 DNF | C2 | 100 | (United Kingdom) John Barlett Racing | (United Kingdom) Richard Jones (Sweden) Kenneth Leim (Morocco) Max Cohen-Olivar | Chevron B62 | **A** | 33 |
| 30 DNF | C2 | 100 | (United Kingdom) John Barlett Racing | (United Kingdom) Richard Jones (Sweden) Kenneth Leim (Morocco) Max Cohen-Olivar | Ford Cosworth DFL 3.3 L V8 | **A** | 33 |
| 31 DNF | C1 | 66 | (United Kingdom) EMKA Productions Ltd. | (United Kingdom) Tiff Needell (United Kingdom) Steve O'Rourke (United Kingdom) James Weaver | EMKA C83 | **D** | 19 |
| 31 DNF | C1 | 66 | (United Kingdom) EMKA Productions Ltd. | (United Kingdom) Tiff Needell (United Kingdom) Steve O'Rourke (United Kingdom) James Weaver | Aston Martin-Tickford 5.3 L V8 | **D** | 19 |
| 32 DNF | C1 | 52 | (United Kingdom) TWR Jaguar | (Germany) Hans Heyer (France) Jean-Louis Schlesser | Jaguar XJR-6 | **D** | 14 |
| 32 DNF | C1 | 52 | (United Kingdom) TWR Jaguar | (Germany) Hans Heyer (France) Jean-Louis Schlesser | Jaguar 6.0 L V12 | **D** | 14 |
| 33 DNF | C2 | 107 | (France) Jean-Claude Ferrarin | (France) Jean-Claude Ferrarin (France) Lucien Rossiaud | Isolia 001 | **A** | 1 |
| 33 DNF | C2 | 107 | (France) Jean-Claude Ferrarin | (France) Jean-Claude Ferrarin (France) Lucien Rossiaud | BMW M12 2.0 L I4 | **A** | 1 |
| DNS | C1 | 14 | (United Kingdom) Richard Lloyd Racing | (United Kingdom) Jonathan Palmer (United Kingdom) David Hobbs | Porsche 956 GTi | **G** | - |
| DNS | C1 | 14 | (United Kingdom) Richard Lloyd Racing | (United Kingdom) Jonathan Palmer (United Kingdom) David Hobbs | Porsche Type-935 2.6 L Turbo Flat-6 | **G** | - |
| DNQ | B | 156 | (France) Raymond Touroul | (France) Raymond Touroul (France) Thierry Perrier (France) Philippe Dermagne | Porsche 911SC | **P** | - |
| DNQ | B | 156 | (France) Raymond Touroul | (France) Raymond Touroul (France) Thierry Perrier (France) Philippe Dermagne | Porsche 3.0 L Flat-6 | **P** | - |

== Statistics ==
- Pole Position - #4 Martini Racing - 2:05.91
- Fastest Lap - #1 Rothmans Porsche - 2:10.73
- Average Speed - 169.335 km/h

World Sportscar Championship
| Previous race: 1985 1000 km of Mosport | 1985 season | Next race: 1985 1000 km of Brands Hatch |
