= March 802 =

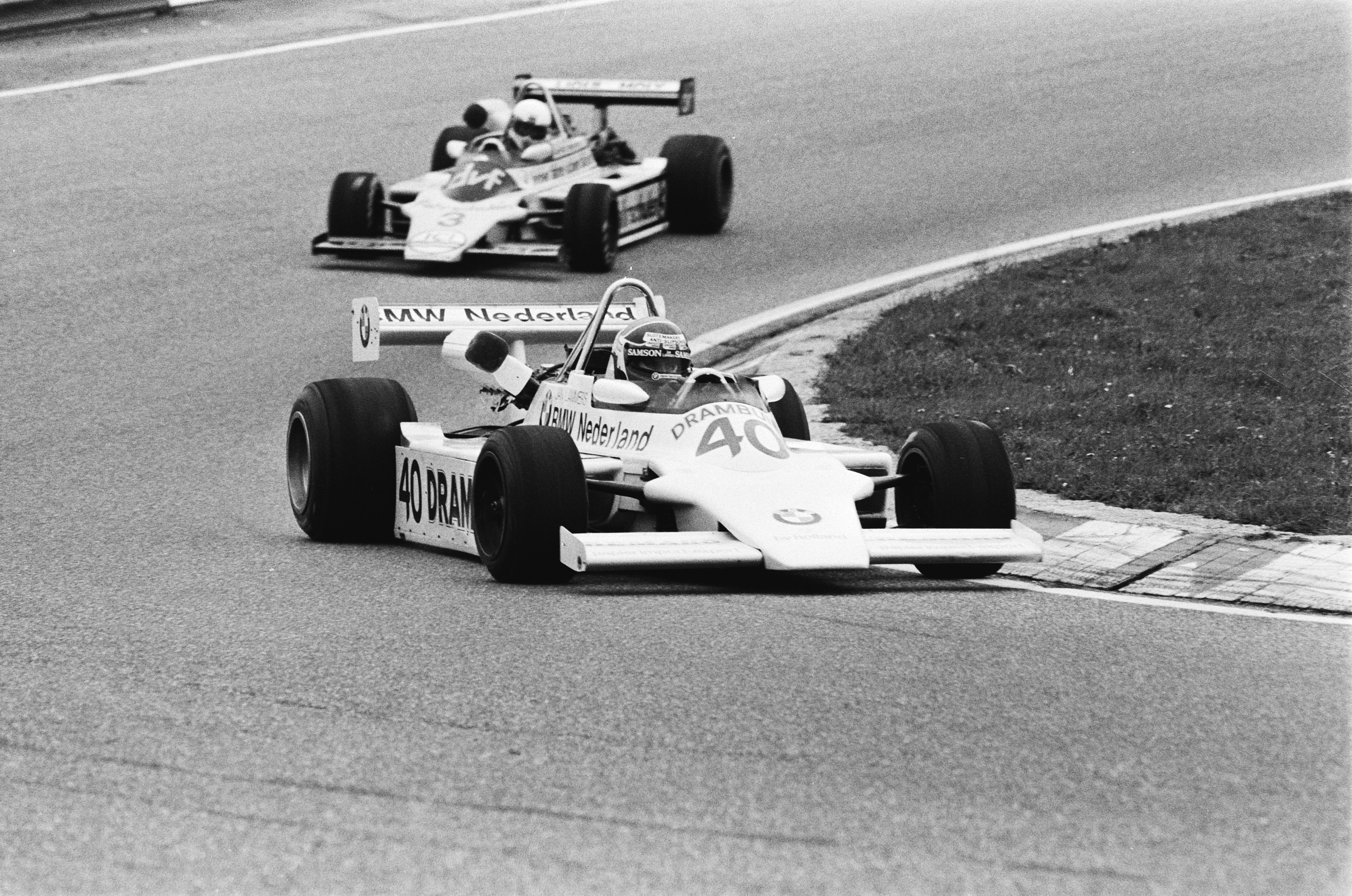
Jan Lammers driving a March 802 at Circuit Zandvoort in 1980

The March 802 was an open-wheel Formula 2 racing car chassis, designed, developed and built by British manufacturer March Engineering in 1980. The car's best result in Formula 2 racing was third in the 1980 championship season, with Teo Fabi scoring 3 wins with ICI Racing Team. It was mainly powered by the BMW M12/7, but also Hart 420R, which were both 2.0 L (120 cu in) four-cylinder engines. As with other models, it was later decided to convert the car and chassis to a closed-wheel sports prototype, and was used in the revived American Can-Am series, between 1981 and 1984. It was also used in the similar European Interserie sports car racing series, where its best result was a 1st-place finish at Zeltweg in 1981, being driven by Walter Lechner.
