= Toleman TG280 =

Formula 2 racing car

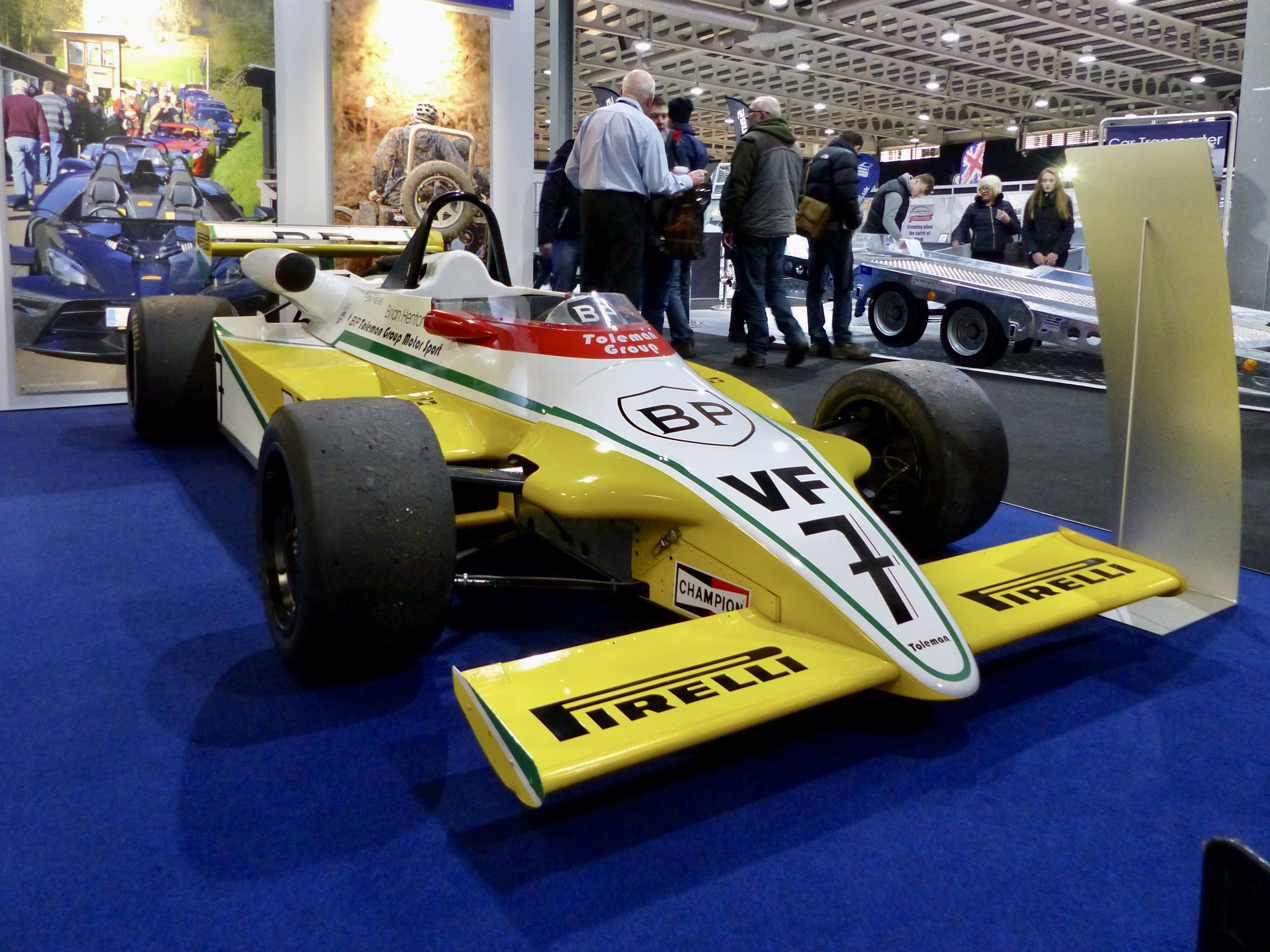
- Toleman TG280 at Race Retro, Stoneleigh, 2018
- Category: Formula 2
- Constructor: Toleman
- Designer: Rory Byrne

Technical specifications
- Chassis: Aluminum Monocoque
- Axle track: 1,505 mm (59.3 in) (Front); 1,435 mm (56.5 in) (Rear)
- Wheelbase: 2,510 mm (98.8 in)
- Engine: Hart 420R 1,994 cc (122 cu in) L4 naturally-aspirated mid-engined
- Transmission: Hewland F.T.200 5-speed manual
- Power: 305 hp (227 kW)
- Weight: 515 kg (1,135.4 lb)
- Tyres: Pirelli

Competition history
- Notable drivers: Brian Henton, Derek Warwick, Siegfried Stohr, Huub Rothengatter, Alberto Colombo, Carlo Rossi
- Debut: 1980 P&O Ferries/Jochen Rindt Trophy, Thruxton
Races	Wins
12	6
- Constructors' Championships: 1: Toleman (1980)
- Drivers' Championships: 1: Brian Henton (1980)

The Toleman TG280 is an open-wheel ground effect Formula 2 racing car, developed and made by Toleman for the European Formula Two Championship, in 1980.

== History ==
It was designed by South African designer and engineer Rory Byrne. It successfully won and completely dominated the European F2 Championship in 1980, with Brian Henton and Derek Warwick finishing 1st and 2nd in the championship standings. It was powered by the 305 hp (227 kW) Hart 420R 2.0 L (120 cu in) four-cylinder engine, which droves the rear wheels via a Hewland F.T.200 5-speed manual transmission. After Formula 2 racing, it was later converted into a Can-Am-style prototype, and used in the European-based Interserie series.
