= Maurer MM82 =

- Category: Formula 2
- Constructor: Maurer Motorsport
- Designers: Gustav Brunner; Paul Brown

Technical specifications
- Chassis: Carbon-fiber honeycomb monocoque with rear sub-frame covered in carbon-fiber body
- Suspension (front): Double wishbones, Coil springs over Dampers, Anti-roll bar
- Suspension (rear): Twin lower links, Single top links, twin trailing arms, Coil springs over Dampers, Anti-roll bar
- Engine: BMW M12/7, mid-engined, longitudinally mounted, 2.0 L (122.0 cu in), I4, NA
- Transmission: Maurer/Hewland 5-speed manual
- Power: 320 hp (240 kW)
- Weight: 515 kg (1,135 lb)
- Brakes: Disc brakes all-round
- Tyres: Michelin

Competition history
- Debut: 1982

The Maurer MM82 is an open-wheel race car, designed, developed, and built by German manufacturer Maurer Motorsport, for Formula 2 racing categories, in 1982.
