= Stefan Bellof =

German racing driver (1957–1985)

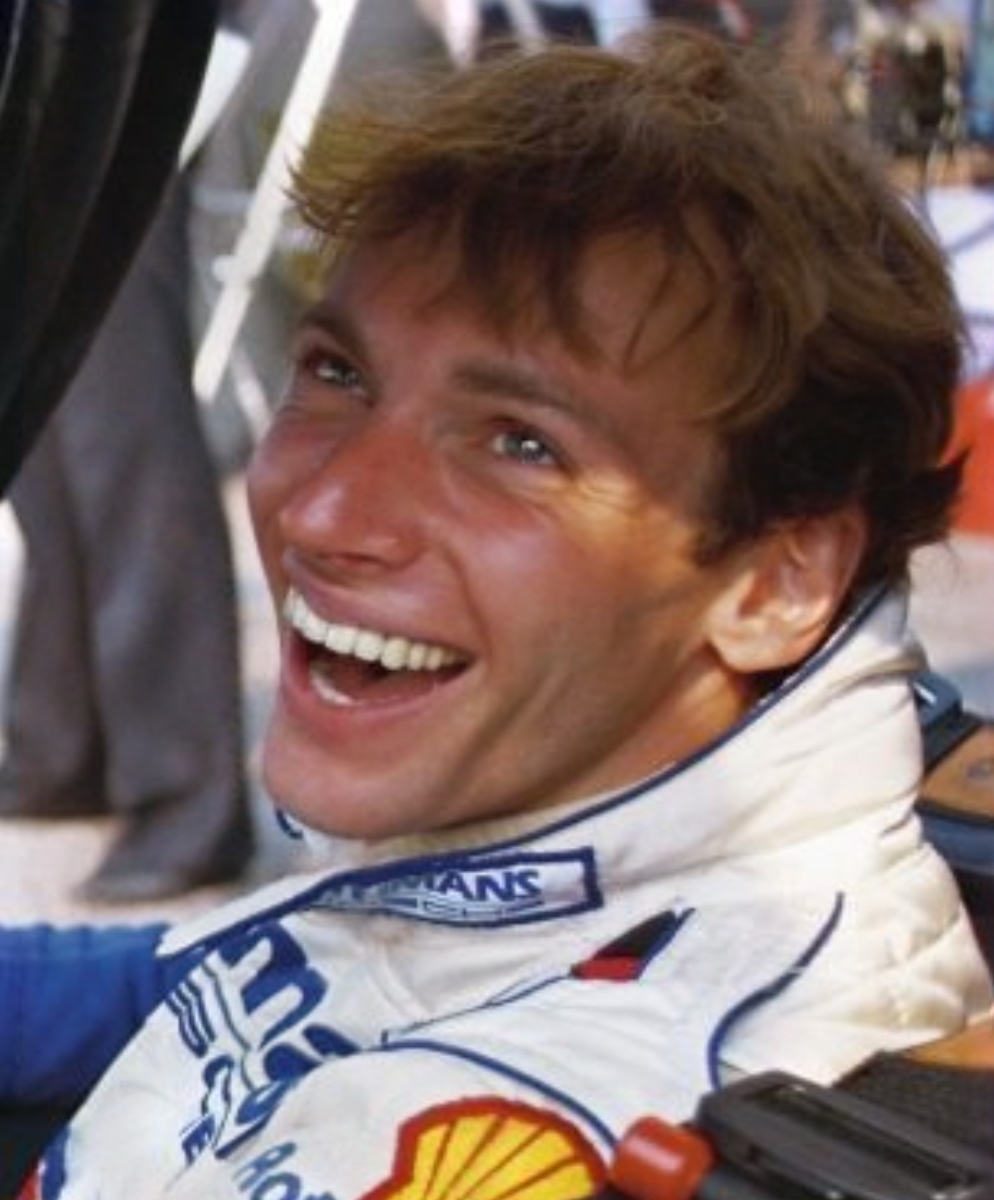
- Bellof in 1985
- Born: 20 November 1957; Gießen, West Germany
- Died: 1 September 1985 (aged 27); Spa-Francorchamps, Belgium

Formula One World Championship career
- Nationality: (West Germany) German
- Active years: 1984–1985
- Team: Tyrrell
- Entries: 22 (20 starts)
- Championships: 0
- Wins: 0
- Podiums: 0
- Career points: 4
- Pole positions: 0
- Fastest laps: 0
- First entry: 1984 Brazilian Grand Prix
- Last entry: 1985 Dutch Grand Prix

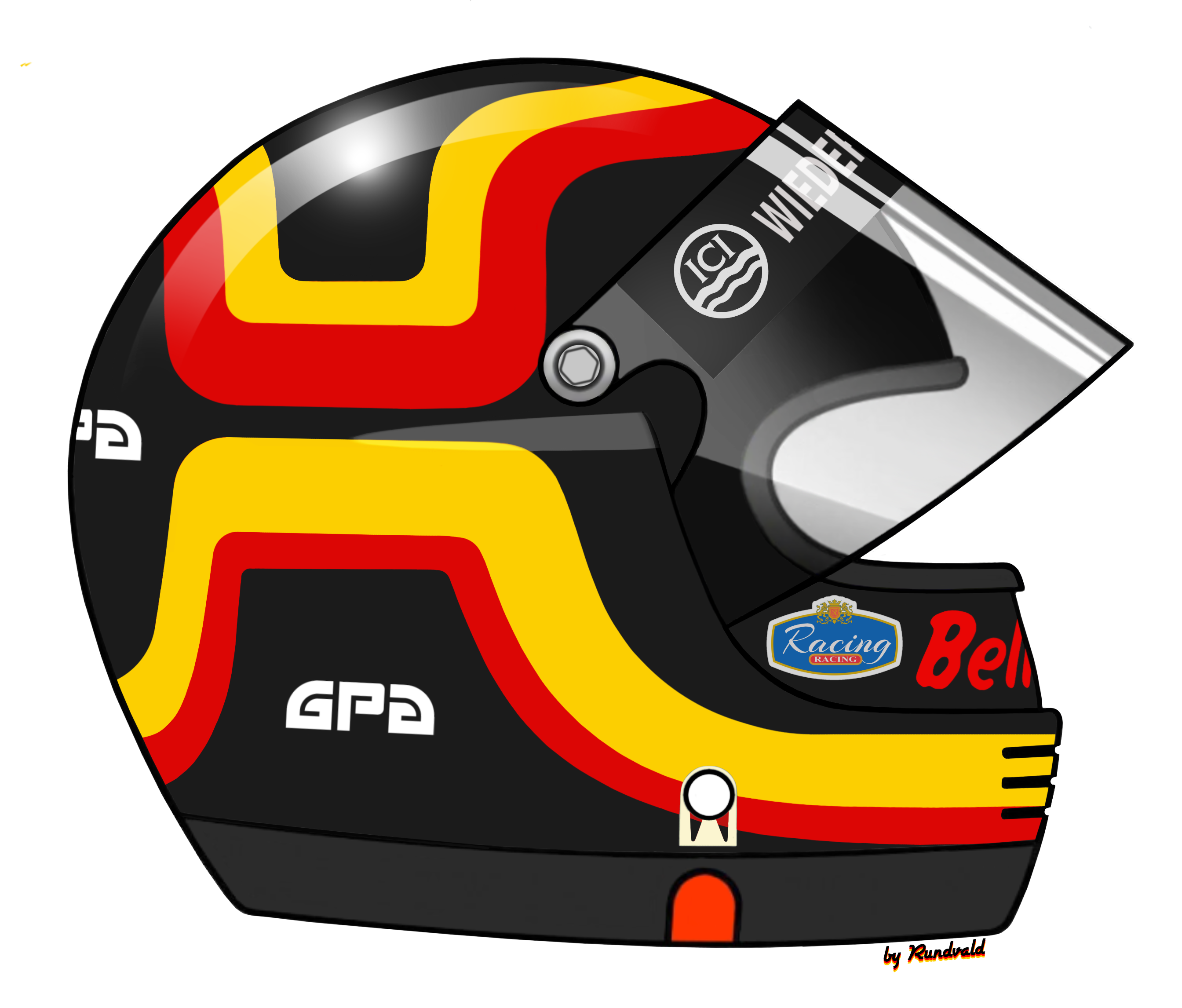
Stefan Bellof's helmet.

Stefan Bellof (20 November 1957 – 1 September 1985) was a German racing driver. Bellof was the winner of the Drivers' Championship in the 1984 FIA World Endurance Championship, driving for the factory Rothmans Porsche team. His lap record on the Nordschleife configuration at the Nürburgring, set while qualifying for the 1000 km race in 1983, stood for 35 years, when it was beaten by Timo Bernhard in 2018. He also competed in Formula One with Tyrrell Racing during 1984 and 1985. Bellof was killed in an accident during the 1985 1000 km of Spa, a round of the 1985 World Sportscar Championship.

== Career ==
=== Karting ===
Born in Gießen, West Germany, and following in his brother Georg's footsteps, Stefan Bellof made his karting début in 1973, competing in the Automobilclub von Deutschland's Federal Junior Cup, in which he ended up in fourth position. Several other top-five championship placings occurred during the next few years before Bellof claimed his first karting title, by winning the International Karting Championship of Luxembourg in 1976. In the same season, Bellof also finished thirteenth in the Karting World Championship in Hagen, Germany. Georg won the German Karting Championship in 1978, while Stefan finished in eighth position in the same race, improving to third in 1979 and becoming German champion in 1980, while dovetailing a campaign in Formula Ford.

=== Junior formulae ===
Bellof moved into Formula Ford at the tail end of the 1979 season, as a member of Walter Lechner's Racing School setup, making his bow at Hockenheim in November 1979, where he finished in second place. A full season in the 1600cc class beckoned in 1980, and Bellof became champion taking eight victories and nine podium placings from twelve races. He continued in the series in 1981, but was not as successful as his championship-winning season, taking five wins and also made a foray into the more powerful 2000cc class, but retired from both his starts in the Lion Trophy at Zolder and the 300 km meeting at the Nürburgring. Bellof also contested three VW Castrol Europa Pokal races, of which he won one. He also raced at Hockenheim in the European Renault 5 Turbo Cup but retired.

As well as those outings, Bellof moved into the German Formula Three Championship, making his début for Bertram Schäfer's team at Wunstorf. Despite missing the opening two races of the season, Bellof led the championship by seven points going into the final round at the Nürburgring, having taken a top-four finish in each of his first eight races. Luck eluded Bellof however, as he finished the race in 13th position, while title rivals Frank Jelinski and Franz Konrad finished in first and second places to overhaul Bellof's points total. Eleven points separated Bellof from Jelinski, who claimed his second successive German Formula Three championship. At the conclusion of the season, Bellof contested the Formula Ford Festival at Brands Hatch, but was excluded from the meeting after finishing sixth in his quarter-final heat, for excessive contact. Bellof made a promise to the meeting's clerk of the course, saying that the official had "better watch my career, because I'll be back here next year and I'll win my first Formula 2 race."

=== Formula Two ===
Bellof joined Mike Thackwell and Alain Ferté at a test session with Maurer Motorsport at Circuit Paul Ricard in France at the end of the 1981 season. Eje Elgh, who finished third with Maurer in the 1981 European Formula Two Championship was present at the test and was impressed by Bellof, and recommended him to team boss Willy Maurer to sign him for the 1982 season. After acquiring a limited amount of BMW backing, Bellof assumed a place in the team, with Maurer eventually becoming his manager, having signed an eight-year management deal with Bellof.

The first race of the season was the BRDC International Trophy at Silverstone, where Bellof qualified ninth on the grid. Sticking to his promise that he made at the 1981 Formula Ford Festival, Bellof drove through the field in showery conditions to win by 21 seconds ahead of Satoru Nakajima and became the first driver to win outright, and second driver to win a race on his European Formula Two début after Dave Morgan won on aggregate at Silverstone in 1972. He followed this win up with a second successive triumph at the Jim Clark Gedächtnisrennen at Hockenheim, having started from pole position and achieved the fastest lap during the race. Two points from the next six races ruled him out of the championship hunt, as he fell to an eventual fourth place classification, scoring 33 points.

By comparison to his 1982 season, Bellof's 1983 season was much less successful. He made only one trip to the podium with second at Jarama while he lost another podium when he was disqualified from third place at the Pau Grand Prix, after his and teammate Ferté's cars were found to be underweight at the race's conclusion. Bellof's only other points-scoring finish was fourth at Silverstone, as he finished the season in ninth position on nine points.

=== Sportscar racing ===
While competing in Formula Two in 1982, Bellof made a one-off appearance in the World Endurance Championship at the 1000 km of Spa, partnering Rolf Stommelen at the wheel of a Kremer CK5. The pairing retired from the race on lap 51, due to a problem with the starter motor. The previous weekend, Bellof had joined Kremer to compete in the Hessen Cup at Hockenheim as part of the Deutsche Rennsport Meisterschaft, but retired with transmission failure.

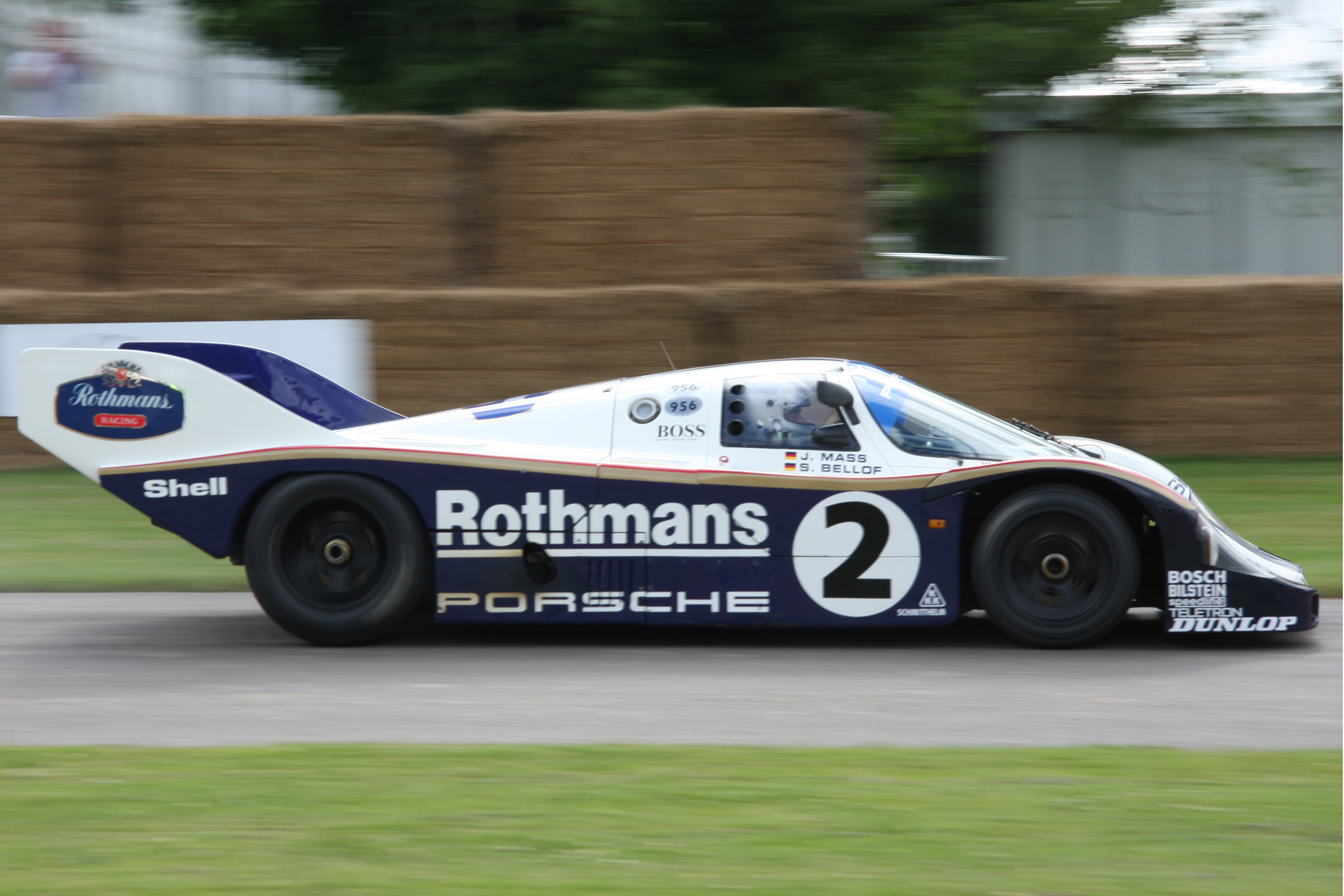
A Porsche 956 being demonstrated at the 2008 Goodwood Festival of Speed, formerly a car shared by Bellof and Jochen Mass in the 1983 World Endurance Championship.

In 1983, Bellof joined the Rothmans-backed Porsche factory team for the World Endurance Championship driving a Porsche 956 alongside Derek Bell. Bellof and Bell won first time at the 1000 km Silverstone, beating Bob Wollek and Stefan Johansson by almost a minute, having taken the lead at half-distance, completing the race's duration at an average speed of 198.274 kilometres per hour (123.202 miles per hour). Bellof's pole time for the race – 1 minute, 13.15 seconds – would have put him twelfth on the grid for the British Grand Prix later in the year. The next race on the calendar was the 1000 km Nürburgring in which Bellof rewrote several records at the Nordschleife. His pole time for that race of 6 minutes, 11.13 seconds is unofficially the fastest lap ever driven on the Nürburgring Nordschleife in its current configuration, taking pole position by five seconds, at an average speed of 202.073 kilometres per hour (125.562 miles per hour). Bellof also set the fastest lap during the race, with a lap time of 6 minutes, 25.91 seconds, which remains the official Nordschleife lap record for all cars. Two laps after setting the race record, on lap 20, Bellof's 956 – chassis 956-007 – flipped out of the race at the Pflanzgarten. Bellof added two more wins later in the season at Kyalami and at Fuji, as he ended the season in fourth position. He also added a win in the non-championship Norisring Trophäe race.

Bellof was the dominant force in the 1984 championship driving alongside Bell, with John Watson also joining the team. Bellof also contested races with Brun Motorsport with whom he won at Imola partnering Hans-Joachim Stuck. Bell and Bellof won the opening round of the season at Monza, but only after the pairing were reinstated to the results. After crossing the line first, their 956 was promptly disqualified in scrutineering with the car found to be under the 850 kg (1,874 lb) weight limit, which would also apply to the third-placed Martini Racing Lancia LC2. Appeals from both teams were lodged, with the outcome being successful.

Other victories at the Nürburgring, Spa, Mosport and Sandown helped Bellof claim the World Sportscar title by eight points from Jochen Mass, and also helped Porsche secure the manufacturer's title for the year; the make taking all but one victory in the season. He was also champion in the German DRM series. Bellof only contested six sportscar races in 1985, taking one win at the Norisring alongside Thierry Boutsen again in DRM.

=== Formula One ===
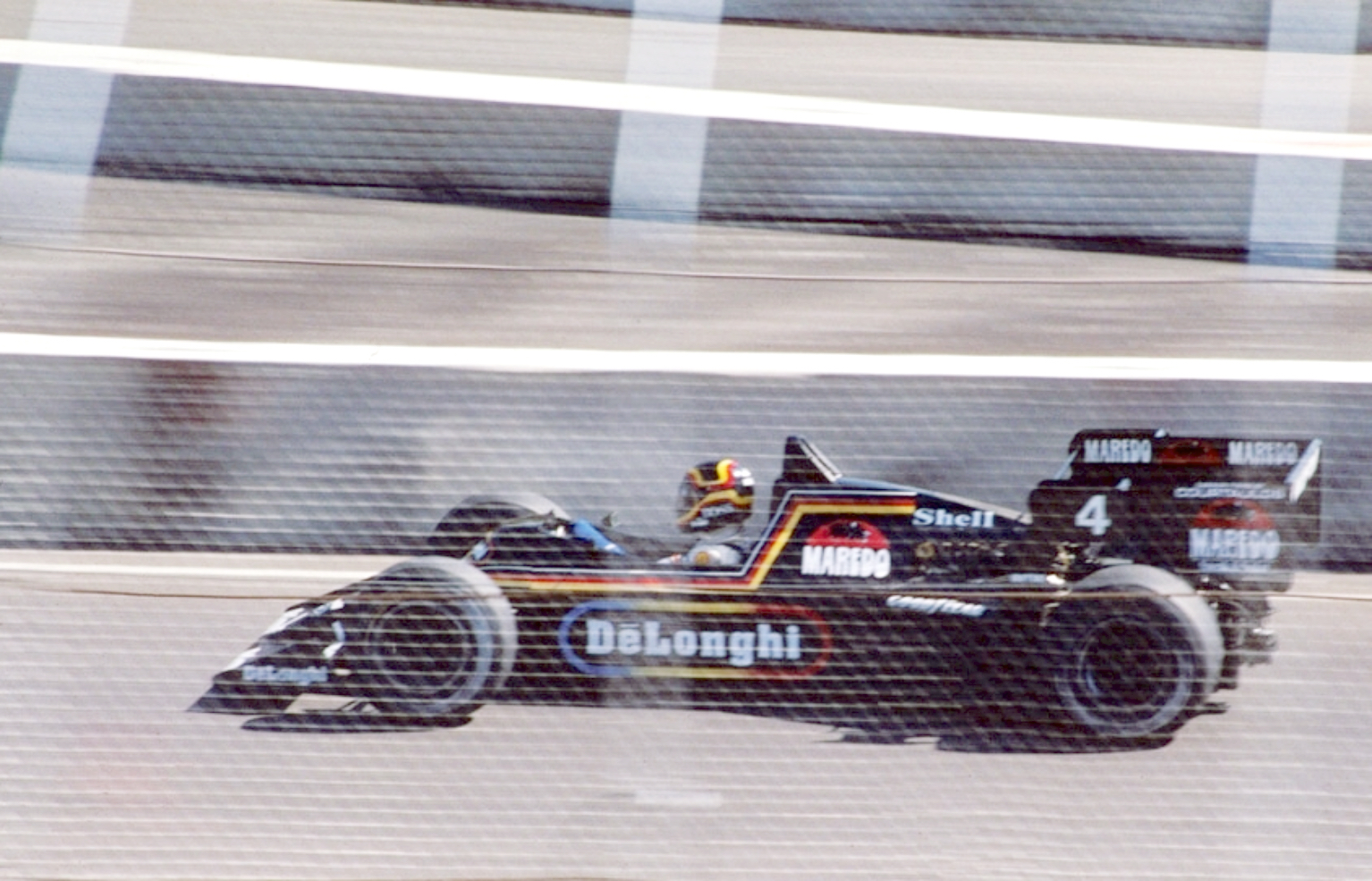
Bellof in a Tyrrell 012 at the 1984 Dallas Grand Prix.

Bellof first tested a Formula One car towards the end of 1983, when he joined the top two drivers from that season's British Formula 3 Championship – Ayrton Senna and Martin Brundle – in testing for McLaren at Silverstone, where Bellof damaged the gearbox before Brundle's opportunity behind the wheel. Bellof did move into the championship ahead of the 1984 season, joining Tyrrell Racing Organisation, to partner Brundle in naturally aspirated, Ford-engined machinery, which were giving away in excess of 150 horsepower (110 kW) to their turbo rivals.

Bellof failed to finish in his first two races in Brazil and South Africa, before scoring his first two championship points in successive races at Zolder and Imola. A retirement followed at Dijon, before Bellof achieved a podium finish in the rain-shortened Monaco Grand Prix. Despite starting down in 20th and last place, Bellof remained away from the barriers that caught out many of his rivals, and was catching the race-leading pairing of Alain Prost and Senna when the race was curtailed after 31 laps due to inclement weather conditions. At the end of the race, Bellof had been 21 seconds in arrears of Prost and 13.7 behind Senna. Retirements followed in Canada and in Detroit, where Brundle claimed the team's best result of the season with second position as Bellof stuck his Tyrrell in the pit wall.

However, Bellof, Brundle and the team were stripped of all their championship points, after their cars were disqualified from the 1984 season after a dispute over lead ballast in their fuel tanks found after the Detroit Grand Prix. FISA charged the team on four separate counts, but the team appealed for injunctions to allow them to continue competing in the championship. Ultimately, the FIA Court of Appeal rejected their final appeal and kicked the team out of the remainder of the season. Despite this, Bellof missed his home race to compete in a World Sportscar race on the same weekend at Mosport Park, where he and Derek Bell finished fourth overall and third in class.

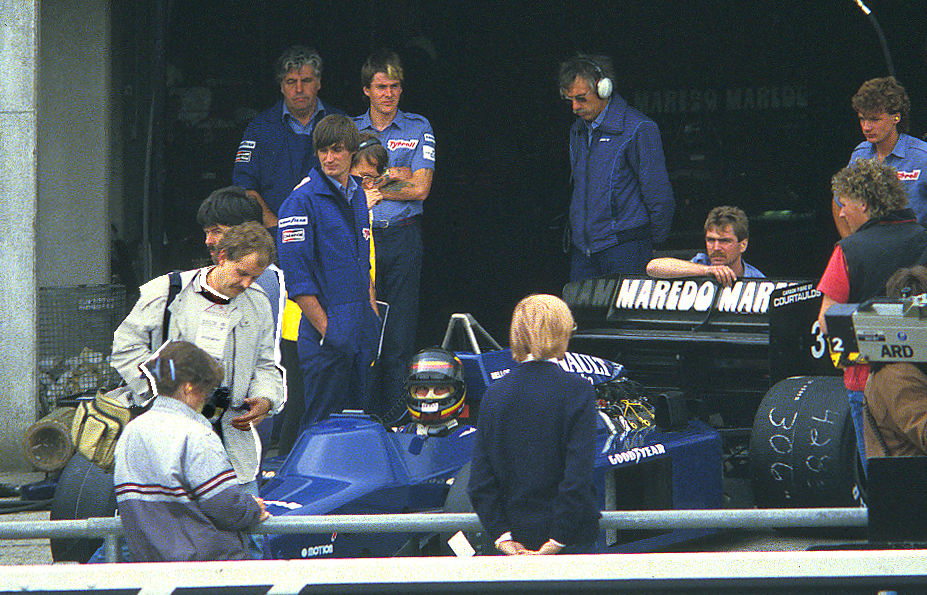
Bellof at the 1985 German Grand Prix.

Bellof remained with the team into the 1985 season, but did miss the opening round of the season – the Brazilian Grand Prix – as Tyrrell had Brundle and Stefan Johansson in their two cars in Rio de Janeiro. Bellof returned at the Portuguese Grand Prix at Estoril where the weather conditions were similar to that of Monaco 1984 in which Bellof had slithered his way up to the on-the-road positioning of third place. He once again started way down the order in 21st place, but by the race's conclusion, he had managed to make it into the top six, and claiming a point for the team, which would be Bellof's first as all of his 1984 results were expunged.

Bellof failed to qualify in Monaco, the only time Bellof failed to qualify in his short Formula One career, along with his exclusion at the 1984 Austrian Grand Prix. He made amends for his error of 1984 in Detroit, by finishing fourth in the 1985 race, which would ultimately be his final three points in Formula One. His final race was the Dutch Grand Prix, where his Renault turbocharged engine blew on lap 40. Tyrrell had only changed to such engines from the German Grand Prix onwards meaning that Bellof never truly had the opportunity to show his talent at the wheel of a Formula One car.

== Death ==
Bellof was racing at the 1000 km of Spa World Sportscar Championship race at the Spa-Francorchamps circuit in Belgium on 1 September 1985, the seventh race of that season's championship. Bellof was making his fourth appearance of 1985 in the series. Partnering Thierry Boutsen as he had done in his other appearances during the season, their Brun-Porsche 956B-116 would start the race from third on the grid, 0.86 seconds adrift of the pole position-winning Lancia LC2.

On lap 78, Bellof was racing Jacky Ickx's works Porsche 962C from the La Source hairpin on the run to Eau Rouge corner. Both drivers had just commenced their stints in their respective cars after Boutsen and Jochen Mass started them. Entering the left kink of Eau Rouge, Bellof moved to the left of Ickx in an attempt to set up a pass for the immediate right-hand Raidillon corner up the hill. This created a side draft on Ickx's 962C, which pulled to the left in an instant, enough to bring Bellof's right front into contact with Ickx's left rear, sending both cars hurtling away from each other. Ickx's car spun, and as he desperately tried to recover it, it spun so that the right rear of the car impacted the barriers, likely saving his life as the force of the impact pushed him back into his seat. Bellof, on the other hand, crashed directly into the barriers at unabated speed with his left front corner, breaking through and hitting a secondary wall. The Brun Porsche caught fire moments after the wreck, while Ickx – able to climb unaided from his car – attempted to help safety workers in extricating Bellof. During the caution period, members of the Brun team also arrived to aid in the rescue. With smoke pouring from the wreckage, the emergency medical team struggled for over 10 minutes before extricating him. Bellof was pronounced dead of massive internal injuries after he had reached the track hospital.

Out of respect for Bellof, the race organisers chose to end the event some 150 km earlier than planned. The entire incident was recorded on an in-car camera that Ickx's 962C was carrying. Even after the accident, the camera continued to work, and was pointed in the direction of Bellof's wreckage. The accident involving Bellof was the second in the space of three weeks in which a driver was killed at the wheel of a Porsche. At the previous World Sportscar race at Mosport Park in Canada, fellow West German and F1 driver Manfred Winkelhock died of severe head trauma after crashing into a concrete wall while at the wheel of a Kremer Racing-run Porsche 962C. Many of the customer teams had concerns with using the 956 for the remainder of the season, and the 956 was eventually withdrawn from the series by the end of the 1986 season, taking victory on its final start at the 1000 km of Fuji.

== Effect and legacy ==
After Bellof's death at Spa, Formula One teams became unwilling to allow their expensive drivers to compete in other races that were not part of the championship. Fellow Formula One driver Jonathan Palmer was injured in an unrelated accident during a free practice session at the same meeting, with the result being that many teams would have drivers' contracts tightened to prohibit them from competing outside their respective championships. Bellof's talent had been noted by many of the rival teams that he had been competing against in Formula One, including an offer from Ferrari for the 1986 season, with a meeting scheduled with Enzo Ferrari before his death.

Bellof is often mentioned as Michael Schumacher's childhood racing idol. During an interview for the January 2007 issue of the 911 and Porsche World magazine, teammate Derek Bell felt Bellof's death was caused by lack of discipline in his driving style, and that the blame for his death lay with those around Bellof, including team personnel, who should have allowed him to mature. In 2010 Bellof's family donated his racing mementos to the local Sammler und Hobbywelt museum for public display. The donated items included his go-kart from his early racing days, his racing overalls and helmets from his works Porsche and Tyrrell days and trophies. There is a karting circuit named in his honour known as Motorsportarena Stefan Bellof, located in Oppenrod.

In 2009, a poll of 217 Formula One drivers chose Bellof as their 35th greatest Formula One driver, in a survey conducted by British magazine Autosport. In August 2013, Bellof was honoured after management of the Nürburgring renamed the section of the Nordschleife previously known as Pflanzgarten III as the Stefan-Bellof-S. In the 2015 6 Hours of Spa-Francorchamps, German driver Timo Bernhard wore a helmet with Bellof's helmet livery to commemorate the 30th anniversary of Bellof's death.

== Racing record ==
=== Career summary ===
Season	Series	Team	Races	Wins	Poles	F/Laps	Podiums	Points	Position
1979	Formula Ford 1600 Germany	Walter Lechner Racing School	1	0	0	0	1	?	?
1980	Formula Ford 1600 Germany	Walter Lechner Racing School	12	8	?	?	9	?	**1st**
1981	German Formula Three Championship	Bertram Schäfer Racing	9	3	5	4	6	124	**3rd**
1981	Formula Ford 1600 Germany	Walter Lechner Racing School	10	5	?	?	8	77	4th
1981	Formula Ford 2000 Germany	Walter Lechner Racing School	2	0	?	?	0	?	NC
1981	Formula Ford Festival	Walter Lechner Racing School	1	0	0	0	0	N/A	NC
1981	VW Castrol Europa Pokal	Walter Lechner Racing School	3	1	1	0	2	15	12th
1982	European Formula Two Championship	Maurer Motorsport	13	2	1	5	4	33	4th
1982	World Endurance Championship	Kremer Racing	1	0	0	0	0	0	NC
1982	Deutsche Rennsport Meisterschaft	Kremer Racing	1	0	0	0	0	0	NC
1983	European Formula Two Championship	Maurer Motorsport	8	0	1	2	1	9	9th
1983	World Endurance Championship	Rothmans Porsche	6	3	4	4	4	75	4th
1983	European Endurance Championship	Rothmans Porsche	1	0	0	1	1	47	10th
1983	All Japan Sports Prototype Championship	Rothmans Porsche	1	1	1	1	1	20	4th
1983	Norisring Trophäe	Rothmans Porsche	1	1	1	1	1	N/A	**1st**
1984	World Endurance Championship	Rothmans Porsche	9	6	5	3	6	139	**1st**
1984	World Endurance Championship	Brun Motorsport	9	6	5	3	6	139	**1st**
1984	Formula One World Championship	Tyrrell Racing Organisation	11	0	0	0	0	0	NC
1984	All Japan Sports Prototype Championship	Rothmans Porsche	1	1	1	1	1	20	7th
1984	Deutsche Rennsport Meisterschaft	Brun Motorsport	5	3	2	1	3	80	**1st**
1984	Norisring Trophäe	Brun Motorsport	1	0	0	0	1	N/A	**3rd**
1985	World Endurance Championship	Brun Motorsport	4	0	0	2	1	12	32nd
1985	Deutsche Rennsport Meisterschaft	Brun Motorsport	1	1	1	0	1	20	12th
1985	Norisring Trophäe	Brun Motorsport	1	0	1	1	0	N/A	5th
1985	Formula One World Championship	Tyrrell Racing Organisation	9	0	0	0	0	4	16th

=== Complete European Formula Two Championship results ===
(key) (Races in bold indicate pole position; races in italics indicate fastest lap)

Year	Entrant	Chassis	Engine	1	2	3	4	5	6	7	8	9	10	11	12	13	Pos.	Pts
1982	Maurer Motorsport	Maurer MM82	BMW	SIL; 1	**HOC**; 1	THR; Ret	NÜR; 5	MUG; 7	VLL; Ret	PAU; NC	SPA; Ret	HOC; 3	DON; 6	MAN; Ret	PER; 2	MIS; 5	4th	33
1983	Maurer Motorsport	Maurer MM83	BMW	SIL; 4	THR; Ret	HOC; DNS	NÜR; Ret	VLL	**PAU**; DSQ	JAR; 2	DON; 7	MIS; DNS	PER; Ret	ZOL; 7	MUG		9th	9

=== Complete Formula One results ===
(key)

Year	Entrant	Chassis	Engine	1	2	3	4	5	6	7	8	9	10	11	12	13	14	15	16	WDC	Pts
1984	Tyrrell Racing Organisation	Tyrrell 012	Ford Cosworth DFY 3.0 V8	BRA; DSQ	RSA; DSQ	BEL; DSQ	SMR; DSQ	FRA; DSQ	MON; DSQ	CAN; DSQ	DET; DSQ	DAL; DSQ	GBR; DSQ	GER	AUT; EX	NED; DSQ	ITA	EUR	POR	NC	0*
1985	Tyrrell Racing Organisation	Tyrrell 012	Ford Cosworth DFY 3.0 V8	BRA	POR; 6	SMR; Ret	MON; DNQ	CAN; 11	DET; 4	FRA; 13	GBR; 11									16th	4
1985	Tyrrell Racing Organisation	Tyrrell 014	Renault EF4B 1.5 V6t									GER; 8	AUT; 7	NED; Ret	ITA	BEL	EUR	RSA	AUS	16th	4

^{*} – Tyrrell was stripped of all championship points for 1984 in a dispute over lead ballast in their fuel tanks at the Detroit Grand Prix.

=== Complete World Sportscar Championship results ===
(key) (Races in bold indicate pole position) (Races in italics indicate fastest lap)

Year	Entrant	Class	Chassis	Engine	1	2	3	4	5	6	7	8	9	10	11	Pos.	Pts
1982	Porsche Kremer Racing	C	Porsche CK5	Porsche Type-935 2.8 F6t	MNZ	SIL	NÜR	LMS	SPA; Ret	MUG	FUJ	BRH				NC	0
1983	Rothmans Porsche	C	Porsche 956	Porsche Type-935 2.6 F6t	MNZ	**SIL**; 1	**NÜR**; Ret	LMS; Ret	SPA; 2	**FUJ**; 1	**KYA**; 1					4th	75
1984	Rothmans Porsche	C1	Porsche 956	Porsche Type-935 2.6 F6t	**MNZ**; 1	SIL; 10	LMS	**NÜR**; 1		**MOS**; 4	SPA; 1		**FUJ**; 1	KYA	**SAN**; 1	1st	138
1984	Brun Motorsport	C1	Porsche 956B	Porsche Type-935 2.6 F6t					BRH; 5			IMO; 1				1st	138
1985	Brun Motorsport	C1	Porsche 962C	Porsche Type-935 2.6 F6t	MUG; 3	MNZ; DSQ	SIL	LMS								32nd	12
1985	Brun Motorsport	C1	Porsche 956B	Porsche Type-935 2.6 F6t					HOC; Ret	MOS	SPA; Ret	BRH	FUJ	SHA		32nd	12

=== Complete 24 Hours of Le Mans results ===
Year	Team	Co-Drivers	Car	Class	Laps	Pos.	Class Pos.
1983	(West Germany) Rothmans Porsche	(West Germany) Jochen Mass	Porsche 956	C	281	DNF	DNF

== Bibliography ==
- Robert Weber (December 2024). Automobilsport Racing / History / Passion #42: Stefan Bellof. Sportfahrer Verlag. ISSN 2199-126X.

Sporting positions
Preceded by Jochen Mass	ADAC Norisring Trophäe; Winner; 1983	Succeeded by Manfred Winkelhock
Preceded by Bob Wollek	Deutsche Rennsport Meisterschaft; Champion; 1984	Succeeded by Jochen Mass
Preceded by Jacky Ickx	World Sportscar Championship; Champion; 1984	Succeeded by Derek Bell; Hans-Joachim Stuck
