= Ralt RT2 =

- Category: Formula 2
- Constructor: Ralt
- Designer(s): Ron Tauranac

Technical specifications
- Chassis: Aluminum monocoque with rear sub-frame
- Engine: Mid-engine, longitudinally mounted, Hart 420R, 2.0 L (122.0 cu in), I4, NA
- Transmission: Hewland FT-200 5-speed manual
- Power: ~ 200 hp (149 kW)

Competition history
- Debut: 1979

The Ralt RT2 is an open-wheel ground effect formula racing car, designed, developed and built by Ralt, for Formula Two racing categories, in 1979.

== Background ==
In 1979, the RT2 was developed for Formula Two, with three cars being built for the Toleman team. Later, three more cars were built for private owners, including one exclusively for the revival of the Can-Am series. In 1980 Toleman built its own car, the TG280, which was based somewhat on the RT2 design; this was later built under license by Lola as the T850 and further modified by Docking-Spitzley as the DS1. Two of the original Toleman RT2s were later raced in Can-Am, while the third ended up in South Africa, where copies called Lants were made. Related cars have appeared in Hillclimb and sprint events in the UK as Romans and SPAs.

The RT2 also provided the basis for three cars in other categories: the RT3 in Formula Three, the RT4 in Formula Atlantic (which was also occasionally raced in Formula Two), and the RT5 in Formula Super Vee.
