= March 822 =

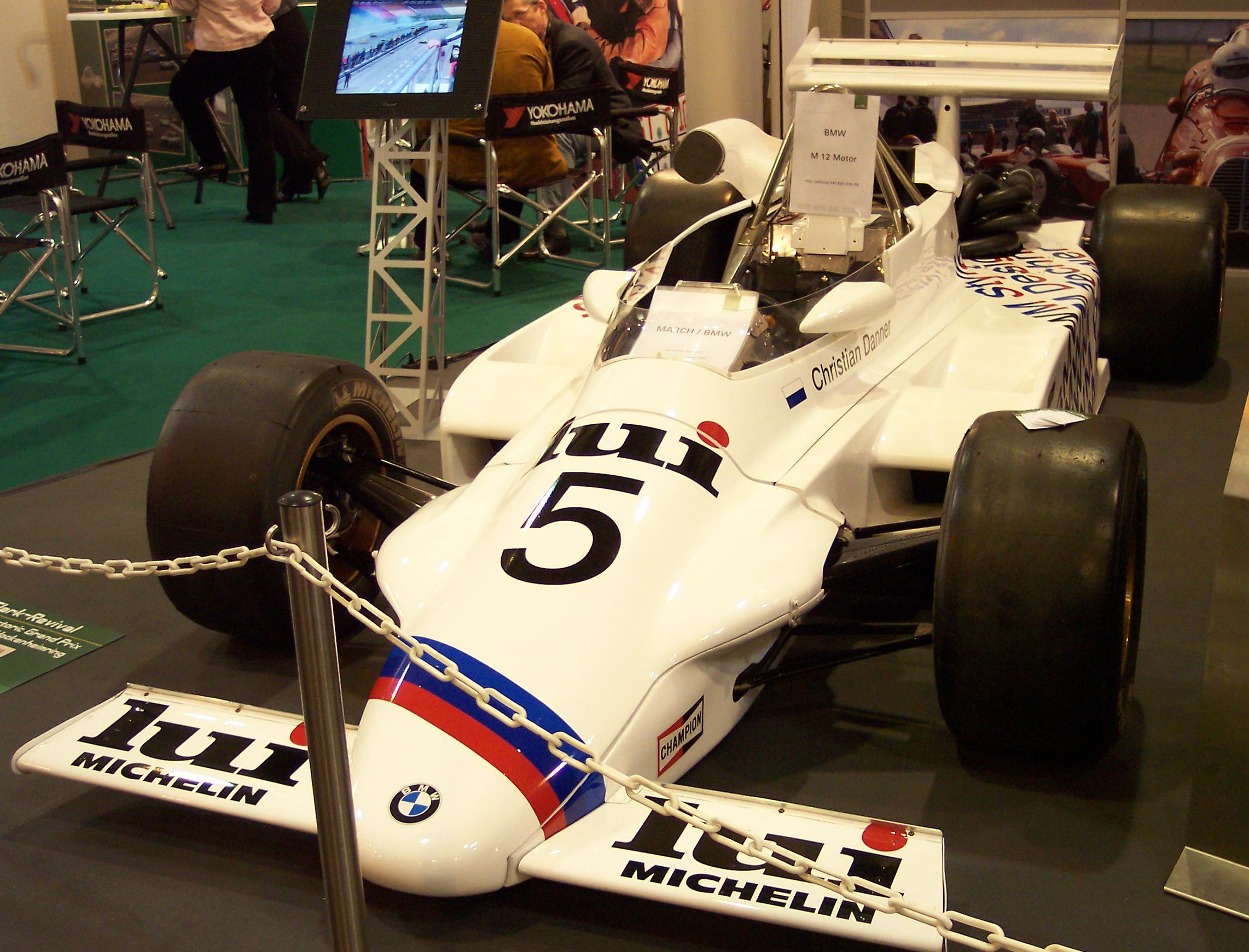
1982 March 822-BMW of Christian Danner

The March 822 was an open-wheel, developed and built by British racing car manufacturer March Engineering in 1982, which was designed in accordance with Formula 2 regulations. In 1982 and 1983 numerous drivers took part in the Formula 2 European Championship and the Japanese Formula 2 Championship. In 1982, Corrado Fabi became European Formula 2 Champion on a March 822, and Satoru Nakajima won the Japanese championship in the same year. A derived version, called the 82A, was used in the Formula Atlantic series.

== Construction ==
The March 822 was developed in the fall of 1981. The responsible designer was Ralph Bellamy. The March 822 was not a new construction, but further development of the March 812 of the previous year. The 822 had a new monocoque that was narrower than that of the 821. The rear suspension was redesigned and aerodynamics had been improved. In the European championship rounds, the cars were usually powered by BMW engines from different tuners; in only one instance did an 822 appear with a four-cylinder Hart engine. In Japan, there were also copies with Honda and Toyota Engines. This drove the rear wheels through a Hewland F.T.200 5-speed manual transmission.

== March-Merzario 282 ==
A modification of the March 822 was the March-Merzario 282, which appeared in Italy in 1982. The Italian team Merzario had designed their own Formula 2 cars up until 1981, which were unsuccessful. For the 1982 season, Arturo Merzario's racing team went over to revising the March 822 chassis taken over from the factory and improving them according to their own ideas. They were then given their own model designation. Details on the scope of the revision are not known. The cars appeared only this year and exclusively in Team Merzario. Jo Gartner and Richard Dallest each achieved a championship point with them.

== Production ==
March made a total of 14 examples of the 822; 13 vehicles were built in 1982, and another one the following year. [4] The vast majority of vehicles were sold to independent customer teams. In 1982 the price for a new 822 without an engine was £19,000.

== Racing history ==
=== 1982 European Formula Two Championship ===
In the 1982 European Championship, the March 822 was the most widely used new Formula Two car.

March Engineering ran (this year for the last time) a works team led by Peter Mackintosh, using a works-backed BMW engine. It sat with Corrado Fabi, Johnny Cecotto, and Christian Danner three drivers who took part in all championship runs. Fabi's car was looked after by Ralph Bellamy, Cecotto's 822 by Adrian Newey. Fabi won five races, and Cecotto three; both took several second places and achieved further results in the points rankings. After the last race, both drivers were tied; Due to a special feature in the regulations, however, only the nine best results were counted for the championship ranking (so-called discarded results), so Cecotto ultimately scored one point less than Fabi. Fabi then became European Champion, Cecotto Vice-Champion. Danner didn't win a race; his best result was fourth place at the Gran Premio dell'Adriatico Gran Premio dell'Adriatico . In the factory team, the 822 was considered a reliable car: Fabi retired four times, Cecotto only once due to technical reasons.

The Italian Merzario team took over three 822 examples, which were subsequently modified.

Markus Hotz's Swiss team Horag Racing entered an 822 that used a BMW engine tuned by Heini Mader Racing Components. The regular driver was Mike Thackwell, who finished two mid-season races in third place. Horag was the most successful March customer team this year. For the last race, the car was passed on to Fredy Schnarwiler, who did not make it into the classification.

In the second half of the season, British team Trundle Racing reported an 822 for American racer Cliff Hansen, who contested seven races but scored no championship points. Hansen's best result was ninth place at the Mantorp Park Trofén in Sweden.

=== 1983 European Formula Two Championship ===
In the 1983 season, March Engineering no longer had its own factory team. The independent team Onyx Racing had taken over the material from the works team. Onyx received customer vehicles but was factory preferred over other customers, so some sources speak of a quasi-factory team here. Onyx used newly designed March 832 models in 1983.

There was only one March 822 entry that year: Irish team Derek McMahon Racing entered a Hart-engined 822 for Derek Daly at the Donington “50,000” at Donington Park. Daly finished the race in ninth place.

=== Japanese Formula Two Championship ===
In the Japanese Formula 2 Championship, cars were often much older than those in the European series. Only a few teams were financially able to buy new vehicles. Satoru Nakajima, who won the 1981 championship in a March 812, contested the first race of the 1982 season in the 812 before switching to an 822 in April 1982. His car, entered by the I&I Racing Development team (registration name: John Player Special Team Ikuzawa), had a six-cylinder Honda engine. Nakajima won the Japanese championship by a clear margin over Kazuyoshi Hoshino, who also used an 822 – albeit with a BMW engine – in the second half of the season.

In 1983, several March 822 models appeared among smaller teams. They mostly used locally tuned BMW engines; Hitoshi Ogawa drove a Toyota-engined 822 alongside.

In 1984 the March 822 stopped appearing in Japan.

=== Later use (post-Formula 2) ===
Some March 822 chassis' were converted into closed-wheel sports prototypes, for use in the revived Can-Am series, as well as the British Thundersports and European Interserie series'. It achieved 3 class wins in the category, and its best results were three 4th-place finishes, all in 1984.

=== Results: European Formula Two Championship ===
Season	Team	Driver	1	2	3	4	5	6	7	8	9	10	11	12	13	Punkte
1982																
1982	(United Kingdom) March Racing	(Italy) C. Fabi	DNF	3	20	2	1	1	DNF	5	1	1	DNF	DNF	1	57
1982	(United Kingdom) March Racing	(Venezuela) J. Cecotto	DNF	4	1	3	2	DNF	1	2	6	2	1	3	15	56 (57)
1982	(United Kingdom) March Racing	(Germany) C. Danner	DNF	DNF	DNF	9	DNF	13	DNF	9	DNF	7	5	6	4	6
1982	(Switzerland) Horag Racing	(New Zealand) M. Thackwell	DNF			DNF	8	9	3	3	10	DNF				8
1982	(Switzerland) Horag Racing	(Sweden) S. Dickens		DNF												0
1982	(Switzerland) Horag Racing	(Germany) H. Hagenbauer									DNF					0
1982	(Switzerland) Horag Racing	Sweden											DNF			0
1982	(Switzerland) Formel Rennsport Club	(Switzerland) F. Schnarwiler													NC	0
1982	(United Kingdom) | Trundle Racing	(United States) C. Hansen							DNF	DNF	17	15	9	13	DNF	0
1983																
1983	(Republic of Ireland) Derek McMahon Racing	(Republic of Ireland) D. Daly								9						0
