= Maurer Motorsport (Germany) =

German motor racing team

(West Germany) Maurer Motorsport
- Founded: 1979
- Folded: 1983
- Base: Willy Maurer
- Team principal(s): Willy Maurer
- Former series: European Formula Two
- Noted drivers: Stefan Bellof; Eje Elgh; Roberto Guerrero; Alain Ferté; Beppe Gabbiani

Maurer Motorsport was a German Formula Two racing car constructor and entrant, founded by Willy Maurer, who had connections to the German Mampe drinks company. The team was notable for its involvement in the early careers of future Ferrari designer Gustav Brunner and Formula One driver Stefan Bellof.

== Racing history ==
Works and privateer Maurers competed in the European Formula Two Championship from 1979 to 1983.

Maurer, on behalf of Mampe, had sponsored the Ford-Zakspeed and Kremer-Porsche teams in the DRM German sportscar series, particularly for driver Armin Hahne, and in 1979 entered him in European Formula Two in a chassis of the team's own design with BMW engines. The car only achieved one race start, from which it retired, and Hahne left at the end of the season.

For 1980, Maurer recruited Eje Elgh, who had some experience of the series previously and Austrian driver Markus Höttinger. Results did not initially improve and there were setbacks after Höttinger was killed at Hockenheim when he was hit by a wheel which had become detached from a crashed car and Elgh broke an arm in a testing accident. However, Elgh brought some technical staff from his previous team, Chevron, and by mid-season the car (designated MM80) was more competitive, driven by substitute drivers, Beppe Gabbiani and Helmut Henzler.

For 1981, Elgh continued with the team and was joined by future Formula One driver Roberto Guerrero. At the insistence of the former Chevron staff members, the team base was moved to England and Gustav Brunner joined on a full-time basis. Results improved and Elgh took third place in the championship, with Guerrero seventh.

Towards the end of 1981, Brunner began work on a Cosworth-engined Formula One design for Maurer, but the project was abandoned after Stefan Bellof joined for 1982 and the team became more successful in Formula 2 again.

In 1982, Elgh departed in the hope of a Formula One career and the team recruited Bellof and Gabbiani as the main drivers. Helped by a controversial system which locked the car down at high speed in a similar fashion to the Lotus 88 Formula One car, Bellof won the first two races but a series of protests and reliability problems hampered the rest of the season. Bellof and Gabbiani finished fourth and fifth in the championship respectively.

1983 was Maurer's last season as a motorsport entrant. The team re-located to Germany and Brunner left to join ATS. There were also engine supply problems and the team achieved no wins, although two victories were lost with last lap reliability issues and scrutineering failures respectively. The season ended with places of ninth and fifteenth in the championship for Bellof and Alain Ferté with a tenth place for Kenny Acheson who achieved one second-place finish for the team. The team folded shortly thereafter, in dispute with the British side of the operation and Bellof moved to Tyrrell in Formula One partly with Willy Maurer's backing.

== Complete European Formula Two results ==
(key) (Results in bold indicate pole position; results in italics indicate fastest lap.)

Year	Chassis	Engine(s)	Drivers	1	2	3	4	5	6	7	8	9	10	11	12	13
1979	Maurer MM1	BMW		SIL	HOC	THR	NÜR	VAL	MUG	PAU	HOC	ZAN	PER	MIS	DON	
1979	Maurer MM1	BMW	(Germany) Armin Hahne				DNS	DNQ		DNQ	DNS			DNQ	Ret	
1980	Maurer MM80	BMW		THR	HOC	NÜR	VAL	PAU	SIL	ZOL	MUG	ZAN	PER	MIS	HOC	
1980	Maurer MM80	BMW	(Sweden) Eje Elgh	Ret	Ret	Ret	Ret								Ret	
1980	Maurer MM80	BMW	(France) Patrick Gaillard					Ret	Ret							
1980	Maurer MM80	BMW	(Italy) Beppe Gabbiani							Ret	11	6	13	7	Ret	
1980	Maurer MM80	BMW	(Austria) Markus Höttinger	Ret	Ret											
1980	Maurer MM80	BMW	(Germany) Helmut Henzler					Ret	10	Ret	8	13	Ret	Ret	Ret	
1981	Maurer MM81	BMW		SIL	HOC	THR	NÜR	VAL	MUG	PAU	PER	SPA	DON	MIS	MAN	
1981	Maurer MM81	BMW	(Sweden) Eje Elgh	18	4	2	2	**1**	4	5	5	3	7	Ret	17	
1981	Maurer MM81	BMW	(Colombia) Roberto Guerrero	Ret	10	1	Ret	Ret	6	Ret	4	Ret	Ret	4	Ret	
1981	Maurer MM81	BMW	(Germany) Manfred Winkelhock									5	**3**			
1982	Maurer MM82	BMW		SIL	HOC	THR	NÜR	MUG	VAL	PAU	SPA	HOC	DON	MAN	PER	MIS
1982	Maurer MM82	BMW	(Germany) Stefan Bellof	1	**1**	Ret	5	7	Ret	9	Ret	3	6	Ret	2	5
1982	Maurer MM82	BMW	(Italy) Beppe Gabbiani	3	5	4	DNS	Ret	Ret	Ret	8	2	4	3	Ret	3
1982	Maurer MM82	BMW	(Austria) Peter Schindler	8	Ret	18										
1982	Maurer MM82	BMW	(Sweden) Eje Elgh				17									
1982	Maurer MM82	BMW	(France) Jean-Louis Schlesser					14	Ret	8	7		8	7	14	Ret
1982	Maurer MM82	BMW	(France) Alain Ferté									Ret				
1983	Maurer MM83	BMW		SIL	THR	HOC	NÜR	VAL	PAU	JAR	DON	MIS	PER	ZOL	MUG	
1983	Maurer MM83	BMW	(Germany) Stefan Bellof	4	Ret	DNS	Ret		**DSQ**	2	7	DNS	Ret	7		
1983	Maurer MM83	BMW	(France) Alain Ferté	Ret	14	12	5	14	DSQ	5	Ret					
1983	Maurer MM83	BMW	(United Kingdom) Kenny Acheson	Ret	10	10	9	11	2	Ret	8					
1983	Maurer MM83	BMW	(France) Pierre Petit	8	12	Ret	10	12	Ret	Ret	Ret	DNS	Ret	8		
1983	Maurer MM83	BMW	(Germany) Frank Jelinski											Ret		
