= Carlo Rossi (racing driver) =

Italian former racing driver (born 1955)

Carlo Rossi (born 28 October 1955) is an Italian former racing driver.

== Complete European Formula Two Championship results ==
(key) (Races in bold indicate pole position; races in italics indicate fastest lap)

Year	Entrant	Chassis	Engine	1	2	3	4	5	6	7	8	9	10	11	12	13	Pos	Pts
1980	Docking Spitzley Ltd	Toleman TG280	Hart	THR	HOC	NÜR	VAL	PAU	SIL	ZOL	MUG	ZAN	PER	MIS	HOC; 10		—	0
1981	Sanremo Racing Srl	Toleman TG280	Hart	SIL; 5	HOC; 6	THR; Ret	NÜR; Ret	VAL; 8	MUG; 8	PAU; 4	PER; Ret	SPA; Ret	DON; Ret	MIS; 10	MAN		13th	6
1982	Docking Spitzley Ltd	Docking-Spitzley DS1	Hart	SIL; Ret	HOC; Ret	THR; Ret	NÜR; 12	MUG; Ret	VAL; DNQ	PAU; DNQ	SPA; Ret	HOC	DON; 13	MAN	PER; Ret	MIS; 12	—	0
