= 1980 European Formula Two Championship =

1980 European Formula Two season

Seasons
- ← 1979 1981 →

The 1980 European Formula Two season was contested over 12 rounds. Toleman driver Brian Henton clinched the championship title.

== Calendar ==
=== Championship ===
Round	Official name	Track	Date	Laps	Distance	Time	Speed	Pole position	Fastest lap	Winner
1	P&O Ferries/Jochen Rindt Trophy	(United Kingdom) Thruxton	7 April	55	3.792=208.560 km	1'04:10.56	194.989 km/h	(United Kingdom) Derek Warwick	(United Kingdom) Brian Henton	(United Kingdom) Brian Henton
2	Jim Clark Rennen	(West Germany) Hockenheim	13 April	27	6.789=183.303 km	0'54:28.99	201.864 km/h	(Italy) Andrea de Cesaris	(New Zealand) Mike Thackwell	(Italy) Teo Fabi
3	Eifelrennen	(West Germany) Nürburgring	27 April	9	22.835=205.515 km	1'08:08.51	180.959 km/h	(France) Richard Dallest	(New Zealand) Mike Thackwell	(Italy) Teo Fabi
4	30 Gran Premio Roma	(Italy) Vallelunga	11 May	65	3.2=208.0 km	1'15:56.1	164.351 km/h	(United Kingdom) Derek Warwick	(United Kingdom) Brian Henton	(United Kingdom) Brian Henton
5	40 Pau Grand Prix	(France) Pau	26 May	73	2.76=201.48 km	1'34:03.57	128.523 km/h	(United Kingdom) Derek Warwick	(United Kingdom) Brian Henton	(France) Richard Dallest
6	Marlboro Formula 2 Trophy	(United Kingdom) Silverstone	8 June	47	4.719=221.793 km	1'03:18.66	210.194 km/h	(United Kingdom) Brian Henton	(United Kingdom) Brian Henton	(United Kingdom) Derek Warwick
7	Grote Prijs van België Formel 2	(Belgium) Zolder	22 June	50	4.262=213,10 km	1.13:44.61	173.385 km/h	(Italy) Teo Fabi	(United Kingdom) Brian Henton	(Netherlands) Huub Rothengatter
8	Marlboro Formula 2 Trophy	(Italy) Mugello	6 July	42	5.245=220.290 km	1'15:22.6	175.351 km/h	(United Kingdom) Derek Warwick	(United Kingdom) Derek Warwick	(United Kingdom) Brian Henton
9	European Formula 2 Championship Race	(Netherlands) Zandvoort	20 July	45	4.226=191.34 km	1'15:23.59	152.274 km/h	(France) Richard Dallest	(United Kingdom) Brian Henton	(France) Richard Dallest
10	18 Gran Premio del Mediterraneo	(Italy) Pergusa-Enna	3 August	45	4.95=222.75 km	1'10:39.79	189.136 km/h	(Italy) Siegfried Stohr	(Italy) Teo Fabi	(Italy) Siegfried Stohr
11	4 Gran Premio del Adriatico	(Italy) Misano	10 August	60	3.488=209.28 km	1'12:39.38	172.835 km/h	(United Kingdom) Brian Henton	(United Kingdom) Brian Henton	(Italy) Andrea de Cesaris
12	Preis Baden-Württemberg	(West Germany) Hockenheim	9 September	30	6.789=203.67 km	0'59:41.06	204.747 km/h	(Italy) Teo Fabi	(Italy) Teo Fabi	(Italy) Teo Fabi

==== Notes ====
- Race 2 was originally scheduled for 30 laps, but abandoned due to Markus Höttinger's fatal crash.
- Hans-Georg Bürger was fatally injured in the warm-up for Race 9.

=== Non-championship ===
An additional Formula Two race was held in which did not count towards the championship.

Official name	Track	Date	Laps	Distance	Time	Speed	Winner
Gran Premio di Monza	(Italy) Monza	7 September	35	3.603=203 km	1'01:03.01	199.487 km/h	(United Kingdom) Derek Warwick

== Results ==
=== Drivers' Championship ===
Pos	Driver	Car(s)	THR (United Kingdom)	HOC (West Germany)	NUR (West Germany)	VAL (Italy)	PAU (France)	SIL (United Kingdom)	ZOL (Belgium)	MUG (Italy)	ZAN (Netherlands)	PER (Italy)	MIS (Italy)	HOC (West Germany)	Pts
1	(United Kingdom) Brian Henton	Toleman TG280-Hart	1	2	2	1	3								61
1	(United Kingdom) Brian Henton	Toleman TG280B-Hart						**NC**	2	1	12	2	**2**		61
2	(United Kingdom) Derek Warwick	Toleman TG280-Hart	**2**	Ret	3	**3**	**Ret**	1	4						42
2	(United Kingdom) Derek Warwick	Toleman TG280B-Hart								**2**	2	11	3		42
3	(Italy) Teo Fabi	March 802-BMW	7	1	1	Ret	Ret	4	**Ret**	3	3	8	Ret	**1**	38
4	(Italy) Siegfried Stohr	Toleman TG280-Hart			4	5	2	18	3	6	Ret	**1**	13	3	29
5	(Italy) Andrea de Cesaris	March 802-BMW	3	**Ret**	Ret	2	Ret	2	Ret	5	Ret	6	1		28
6	(France) Richard Dallest	AGS JH17-BMW	Ret	10	**Ret**	9	1	DNS	8	7	**1**		Ret	4	23
6	(France) Richard Dallest	AGS JH15-BMW										5			23
7	(Netherlands) Huub Rothengatter	Toleman TG280-Hart	6	5	6	7	Ret	5	1	Ret	7	4	4	13	21
8	(New Zealand) Mike Thackwell	March 802-BMW	Ret	Ret	10	4	4	3	6	18	Ret	9	Ret		11
9	(Argentina) Miguel Ángel Guerra	Minardi GM75-BMW	Ret	7	8	8	5	6	5	4	9	Ret	5		10
10	(Italy) Alberto Colombo	March 782-BMW	Ret	3	9	6	6	17	14	9		Ret			9
10	(Italy) Alberto Colombo	Toleman TG280-Hart									8		6	5	9
11	(Brazil) Chico Serra	March 802-BMW	4	4	Ret	Ret	Ret	8	Ret	Ret	4	Ret	Ret	Ret	9
12	(United Kingdom) Nigel Mansell	Ralt RH6-Honda						11	Ret		5			2	8
13	(West Germany) Manfred Winkelhock	March 802-BMW	Ret	Ret	Ret	10	8	9	7	10	10	3	9	7	4
14	(Italy) Oscar Pedersoli	March 782-BMW	5	6	Ret	11	Ret	Ret	Ret	13	Ret				3
15	(West Germany) Jochen Dauer	Chevron B48-BMW		11	5										2
16	(Switzerland) Fredy Schnarwiler	March 802-BMW	Ret	Ret	7	12	7	Ret	Ret	17	Ret	10	10	6	1
17	(Italy) Beppe Gabbiani	Minardi G75-BMW						14							1
17	(Italy) Beppe Gabbiani	Maurer MM80-BMW							Ret	11	6	Ret	7	Ret	1
18	(Switzerland) Jürg Lienhard	March 802-BMW									Ret	7	Ret	9	0
19	(Austria) Jo Gartner	March 782-BMW		13				7		12	11			Ret	0
20	(West Germany) Helmut Henzler	Maurer MM80-BMW					Ret	10	Ret	8	13	Ret	Ret	Ret	0
21	(Switzerland) Eugen Strähl	March 802-BMW		8					12						0
22	(Italy) Riccardo Paletti	March 802-BMW								Ret	14		8	Ret	0
23	(West Germany) Hans-Georg Bürger	Tiga F280-BMW	8	Ret	Ret			Ret		Ret	DNS				0
24	(Italy) Gianfranco Trombetti	March 782-BMW								Ret			DNQ	8	0
25	(Republic of Ireland) Bernard Devaney	March 802-BMW	9	Ret	12			Ret							0
26	(Venezuela) Johnny Cecotto	March 802-BMW						Ret	9						0
26	(Venezuela) Johnny Cecotto	Minardi GM75-BMW									15				0
27	(Italy) Arturo Merzario	Merzario M1-BMW	Ret	Ret	Ret		9	Ret		16	17	DNS		Ret	0
28	(South Africa) Rad Dougall	Ralt RT4-BMW	DNS	9	Ret			16							0
29	(United Kingdom) Warren Booth	Chevron B48-Hart	10					15		DNQ					0
30	(United Kingdom) Jim Crawford	Chevron B45-Ford						Ret	10						0
31	(Italy) Carlo Rossi	Toleman TG280-Hart												10	0
32	(Italy) Guido Daccò	Merzario M1-BMW			11	Ret									0
32	(Italy) Guido Daccò	March 792-BMW								Ret		12	DNQ	11	0
33	(Switzerland) Patrick Studer	March 802-BMW							11	14				Ret	0
34	(Italy) Maurizio Flammini	Ralt RT2-Hart								Ret		Ret	11		0
35	(Italy) Piero Necchi	Merzario M1-BMW				Ret	Ret	12	Ret	Ret	Ret	Ret	DNQ	12	0
36	(Switzerland) Walter Baltisser	March 802-BMW		12							16				0
37	(United States) Tom Gloy	Ralt RH6-Honda										Ret	12		0
38	(Italy) Bruno Corradi	Minardi GM75-BMW				13	Ret						Ret		0
39	(United Kingdom) Kim Mather	March 802-Hart	DNS					13							0
40	(Italy) Danilo Tesini	Chevron B48-BMW			13	DNQ				DNQ					0
41	(Belgium) Pierre Dieudonné	March 802-Hart							13						0
42	(West Germany) Helmut Bross	March 792-Hart			14									Ret	0
43	(Italy) Marco Rocca	Osella FA2-BMW								15					0
43	(Italy) Marco Rocca	March 782-BMW											Ret		0
	(Sweden) Eje Elgh	Maurer MM80-BMW	Ret	Ret	Ret	Ret								Ret	0
	(Austria) Markus Höttinger	Maurer MM80-BMW	Ret	Ret											0
	(United Kingdom) Divina Galica	March 792-Hart	Ret					Ret							0
	(France) Patrick Gaillard	Maurer MM80-BMW					Ret	Ret							0
	(United Kingdom) Roy Baker	Chevron B48-Hart						Ret	DNQ						0
	(Austria) Franz Konrad	March 792-BMW							DNQ					Ret	0
	(United Kingdom) Paul Smith	March 782-Hart							DNQ		Ret				0
	(West Germany) Wolfgang Locher	March 782-Hart	Ret												0
	(West Germany) Harald Grohs	March 792-Hart		Ret											0
	(West Germany) Helmut Kalenborn	Chevron B42-BMW			Ret										0
	(Switzerland) Bruno Eichmann	March 802-BMW				Ret									0
	(Belgium) Patrick Nève	March 802-BMW							Ret						0
	(Netherlands) Jan Lammers	March 802-BMW									Ret				0
	(Italy) Enzo Coloni	March 782-BMW										Ret			0
	(Austria) Willi Siller	Chevron B48-BMW											Ret		0
	(West Germany) Michael Korten	March 802-BMW												Ret	0
	(Switzerland) Ami Guichard	March 782-BMW												Ret	0
	(United Kingdom) Geoff Lees	Ralt RH6-Honda												Ret	0
	(Sweden) Stefan Johansson	March 802-BMW	DNS												0
	(Italy) Sergio Mingotti	Mirage M1-BMW				DNQ									0
Pos	Driver	Car(s)	THR (United Kingdom)	HOC (West Germany)	NUR (West Germany)	VAL (Italy)	PAU (France)	SIL (United Kingdom)	ZOL (Belgium)	MUG (Italy)	ZAN (Netherlands)	PER (Italy)	MIS (Italy)	HOC (West Germany)	Pts

Colour	Result
Gold	Winner
Silver	Second place
Bronze	Third place
Green	Points classification
Blue	Non-points classification
Blue	Non-classified finish (NC)
Purple	Retired, not classified (Ret)
Red	Did not qualify (DNQ)
Red	Did not pre-qualify (DNPQ)
Black	Disqualified (DSQ)
White	Did not start (DNS)
White	Withdrew (WD)
White	Race cancelled (C)
Blank	Did not practice (DNP)
Blank	Did not arrive (DNA)
Blank	Excluded (EX)

- Results in **bold** indicate pole position; results in italics indicate fastest lap.
- Points system: 9-6-4-3-2-1 for first six finishers. Each driver's best nine results counted towards the championship.
