= 1984 British Formula Three Championship =

1984 British Formula 3 International Series

Seasons
- ← 1983 1985 →

The 1984 British Formula Three Championship was the 34th season of British Formula Three. Johnny Dumfries took the BARC/BRDC Marlboro British Formula 3 Championship.

Johnny Dumfries got a drive with Team BP for the season, and ran way with the British title. The Earl of Dumfries, calling himself “Johnny Dumfries” for racing purposes, clinched the title, with three rounds still remaining. His closure rival for most of the season was Russell Spence, but pipped to second place in Championship by the consistent point finishing of Allen Berg.

The scoring system was 9-6-4-3-2-1 points for the first six positions, with one extra-point added for the driver who did the fastest lap of the race.

== BARC/BRDC Marlboro British F3 Championship ==
Champion: (United Kingdom) Johnny Dumfries

Runner Up: (Canada) Allen Berg

Class B Champion: (United Kingdom) Keith Fine

== Results ==
=== Marlboro British Formula 3 Championship ===
Date	Round	Circuit	Winning driver	Winning team	Winning car
04/03/1984	Rd.1	(United Kingdom) Silverstone (National)	(United Kingdom) Johnny Dumfries	Team BP	Ralt-Volkswagen RT3/83
11/03/1984	Rd.2	(United Kingdom) Thruxton	(United Kingdom) Johnny Dumfries	Team BP	Ralt-Volkswagen RT3/83
01/04/1984	Rd.3	(United Kingdom) Silverstone	(United Kingdom) Johnny Dumfries	Team BP	Ralt-Volkswagen RT3/83
15/04/1984	Rd.4	(Belgium) Zolder	(United Kingdom) Russell Spence	Mint Engineering – Warmastyle Racing	Ralt-Volkswagen RT3/84
23/04/1984	Rd.5	(United Kingdom) Thruxton	(United Kingdom) Johnny Dumfries	Team BP	Ralt-Volkswagen RT3/83
07/05/1984	Rd.6	(United Kingdom) Thruxton	(United Kingdom) Johnny Dumfries	Team BP	Ralt-Volkswagen RT3/83
20/05/1984	Rd.7	(United Kingdom) Donington Park	(United Kingdom) Johnny Dumfries	Team BP	Ralt-Volkswagen RT3/83
28/05/1984	Rd.8	(United Kingdom) Silverstone (National)	(Switzerland) Mario Hytten	Murray Taylor Racing	Ralt-Volkswagen RT3/84
01/07/1984	Rd.9	(United Kingdom) Snetterton	(United Kingdom) Johnny Dumfries	Team BP	Ralt-Volkswagen RT3/83
08/07/1984	Rd.10	(United Kingdom) Donington Park	(United Kingdom) Russell Spence	Mint Engineering / Warmastyle Racing	Ralt-Volkswagen RT3/84
18/08/1984	Rd.11	(United Kingdom) Oulton Park	(United Kingdom) Russell Spence	Mint Engineering / Warmastyle Racing	Ralt-Volkswagen RT3/84
27/08/1984	Rd.12	(United Kingdom) Silverstone (National)	(United Kingdom) Johnny Dumfries	Team BP	Ralt-Volkswagen RT3/84
02/09/1984	Rd.13	(Belgium) Spa-Francorchamps	(United States) Ross Cheever	Valour Racing	Ralt-Volkswagen RT3/84
16/09/1984	Rd.14	(Netherlands) Zandvoort	(United States) Ross Cheever	Valour Racing	Ralt-Volkswagen RT3/84
23/09/1984	Rd.15	(United Kingdom) Brands Hatch	(United States) Ross Cheever	Valour Racing	Ralt-Volkswagen RT3/84
30/09/1984	Rd.16	(United Kingdom) Thruxton	(United Kingdom) Johnny Dumfries	Team BP	Ralt-Volkswagen RT3/83
07/10/1984	Rd.17	(United Kingdom) Silvestone	(United Kingdom) Johnny Dumfries	Team BP	Ralt-Volkswagen RT3/83

== Championship Tables ==
=== Class A ===
Place	Driver	Entrant	Total
1	(United Kingdom) Johnny Dumfries	Team BP	106
2	(Canada) Allen Berg	Eddie Jordan Racing	67
3	(United Kingdom) Russell Spence	Mint Engineering / Warmastyle Racing	64
4	(Switzerland) Mario Hytten	Murray Taylor Racing	45
5	(United States) Ross Cheever	Valour Racing	39
6	(Spain) Juan Carlos Abella	West Surrey Racing	26
7	(United Kingdom) Dave Scott	Mint Engineering	19
8	(United Kingdom) Andrew Gilbert-Scott	Murray Taylor Racing	17
9=	(United Kingdom) Gary Evans	West Surrey Racing	11
	(United Kingdom) Tony Trevor	Tony Trevor	11
11	(United Kingdom) David Hunt	Acorn Computer Racing; Eddie Jordan Racing	10
12=	(New Zealand) Paul Radisich	Murray Taylor Racing	7
	(United Kingdom) Paul Jackson	Valour Racing	7
14=	(United States) Earl Lang	Alan Docking Racing	5
	(United Kingdom) Dave Coyne	Murray Taylor Racing	5
16	(Germany) Volker Weidler	Volkswagen Motorsport	4
17	(Netherlands) Cor Euser	Magnum Racing Cars; Josef Kaufmann Racing	1

=== Class B ===
Place	Driver	Entrant	Total
1	(United Kingdom) Keith Fine	MAS Promotion	95
2	(Jamaica) Carlton Tingling	Carlton Tingling	67
3	(United Kingdom) Steve Bradley	Steve Bradley Racing	66
4	(United Kingdom) Gray Hedley	Gray Hedley Racing Team	33
5	(United Kingdom) Richard Morgan		24
6	(United Kingdom) Steve Kempton	Team Beskope	21
7	(United Kingdom) “Anton Sobriquet”	Steve Bradley Racing	19
8	(United Kingdom) Godfrey Hall	Godfrey Hall	18
9	(Sweden) Håkan Olausson	Hampshire Automobile Racing Team	7
10=	(United Kingdom) Mike Blanchet	Terry Racing with Johnson & Bailey	6
	(United Kingdom) Bill Burley	Bill Burley	6
12	(United Kingdom) Ronnie Grant	Ronnie Grant	5
13	(United Kingdom) Dave Button		4
14=	(Norway) Sigurd Krane		2
	(United Kingdom) Jim Yardley		2
	(United Kingdom) John Bullock	John Bullock	2
17=	(United Kingdom) Bernard Horwood	R.D. Motorsport	1
	(United Kingdom) Roger Hamblin	Roger Hamblin	1
