= Dick Bennetts =

New Zealand motorsport engineer (born 1946)

- Born: Richard Andrew Bennetts; 26 June 1946 (age 80); Dunedin, New Zealand
- Citizenship: (New Zealand) New Zealander
- Education: King's High School, Dunedin (1962–1965)
- Occupations: Founder and managing director
- Years active: 1981–2026
- Organization: West Surrey Racing
- Known for: Motorsport management efforts
- Awards: Autosport Gregor Grant Award, Autocar UK Leaders Award, European Race Series Team of the Year (Note: Bennetts was the managing director of the team, being West Surrey Racing.)
- Honours: Auckland Car Club's Roll Of Honour

Richard Andrew "Dick" Bennetts (born 26 June 1946) is a New Zealand motorsport engineer and founder of West Surrey Racing. He has worked with many famous racing drivers, such as Mika Häkkinen, Colin Turkington and Ayrton Senna. Bennetts has worked at West Surrey Racing since its inception in 1981.

== Career ==
Bennetts started his career out in New Zealand, working for smaller racing teams in Fred Opert Racing and Project Four Racing.

After moving to England, Bennetts founded West Surrey Racing, a British-New Zealand racing team. The team debuted in F3 machinery, competing in British F3 and the Macau Grand Prix. In just their second year, Bennetts managed West Surrey Racing to get runner-up in the Drivers' Championship via Quique Mansilla. Ayrton Senna debuted for the team at the Thruxton event of the year. Senna later won the Drivers' Championship for Bennetts' team in 1983, with Maurício Gugelmin following in 1985.

The team moved to the British Touring Car Championship for 1996, acquiring New Zealander Paul Radisich for their first car, whilst Steve Robertson partnered him.

Many years followed, with them taking Colin Turkington to his first BTCC championship in 2009, and later his second, third and fourth in 2014, 2018 and 2019.
