= 2006 Renault Clio Cup United Kingdom =

The 2006 Elf Renault Clio Cup United Kingdom season began at Brands Hatch on 8 April and finished after 20 races over 10 events at Silverstone on 15 October. The Championship was won by Tom Onslow-Cole driving for Total Control Racing.

== Teams & Drivers ==
All competitors raced in Renault Clio Cup 182s.

Team	No.	Drivers	Rounds
Total Control Racing	1	(United Kingdom) Tom Onslow-Cole	All
Total Control Racing	3	(United Kingdom) Nick Adcock	All
Total Control Racing	4	(United Kingdom) Ray MacDowall	4
Total Control Racing	5	(United Kingdom) Ray MacDowall	8
Total Control Racing	18	(United Kingdom) Mark Speller	All
Total Control Racing	19	(United Kingdom) James Williams	All
Mardi Gras Motorsport	2	(United Kingdom) Stephen Colbert	All
Mardi Gras Motorsport	17	(United Kingdom) Mark Fell	1-2
Mardi Gras Motorsport	25	(United Kingdom) Robert Lawson	All
Drive 4 Life with SVE	4	(Austria) Niki Lanik	6-10
JHR Racing Developments	10	(United Kingdom) Steve Wood	6–8, 10
JHR Racing Developments	11	(United Kingdom) Steven Hunter	1-7
JHR Racing Developments	12	(United Kingdom) Michael Doyle	All
JHR Racing Developments	77	(United Kingdom) Phil House	All
Boulevard Team Racing	22	(United Kingdom) Paul Rivett	All
Boulevard Team Racing	26	(Republic of Ireland) Richie Faulkner	8
Boulevard Team Racing	27	(United Kingdom) Martin Johnson	All
Boulevard Team Racing	28	(United Kingdom) James Clarkson	10
Seager Home Solutions with SVE	31	(United Kingdom) Gavin Seager	1
Robertshaw Racing	32	(United Kingdom) Gary Robertshaw	1-2
Robertshaw Racing	32	(United Kingdom) Alan Taylor	3-10
Z Speed Racing	34	(United Kingdom) Martin Byford	6-10
Team Pyro	55	(United Kingdom) Mel Healey	All
Team Pyro	99	(United Kingdom) Mark Hunt	1-9
Double Six Racing with SVE	66	(United Kingdom) Marc Nelson	1-3

== Calendar & Winners ==
The series supported the British Touring Car Championship at eight of the ten rounds. The series skipped the rounds at Mondello Park and Knockhill and instead raced at a BARC meeting at Knockhill on 17–18 June; and the World Series by Renault meeting at Donington Park on 9–10 September.

Round		Venue	Date	Pole position	Fastest lap	Winning driver	Winning team
1	R1	Brands Hatch (Indy), Kent	8–9 April	(United Kingdom) Tom Onslow-Cole	(United Kingdom) Tom Onslow-Cole	(United Kingdom) Tom Onslow-Cole	Total Control Racing
1	R2	Brands Hatch (Indy), Kent	8–9 April	(United Kingdom) Tom Onslow-Cole	(United Kingdom) Nick Adcock	(United Kingdom) Paul Rivett	Boulevard Team Racing
2	R3	Oulton Park (Island), Cheshire	13–14 May	(United Kingdom) Paul Rivett	(United Kingdom) Tom Onslow-Cole	(United Kingdom) Tom Onslow-Cole	Total Control Racing
2	R4	Oulton Park (Island), Cheshire	13–14 May	(United Kingdom) Paul Rivett	(United Kingdom) Tom Onslow-Cole	(United Kingdom) Paul Rivett	Boulevard Team Racing
3	R5	Thruxton Circuit, Hampshire	3–4 June	(United Kingdom) Michael Doyle	(United Kingdom) Tom Onslow-Cole	(United Kingdom) Tom Onslow-Cole	Total Control Racing
3	R6	Thruxton Circuit, Hampshire	3–4 June	(United Kingdom) Paul Rivett	(United Kingdom) Tom Onslow-Cole	(United Kingdom) Steven Hunter	JHR Racing Developments
4	R7	Knockhill Racing Circuit, Fife	17–18 June	(United Kingdom) Tom Onslow-Cole	(United Kingdom) Tom Onslow-Cole	(United Kingdom) Tom Onslow-Cole	Total Control Racing
4	R8	Knockhill Racing Circuit, Fife	17–18 June	(United Kingdom) Tom Onslow-Cole	(United Kingdom) Paul Rivett	(United Kingdom) Paul Rivett	Boulevard Team Racing
5	R9	Croft Circuit, North Yorkshire	15–16 July	(United Kingdom) Tom Onslow-Cole	(United Kingdom) Tom Onslow-Cole	(United Kingdom) Tom Onslow-Cole	Total Control Racing
5	R10	Croft Circuit, North Yorkshire	15–16 July	(United Kingdom) Nick Adcock	(United Kingdom) Tom Onslow-Cole	(United Kingdom) Tom Onslow-Cole	Total Control Racing
6	R11	Donington Park (National), Leicestershire	29–30 July	(United Kingdom) Tom Onslow-Cole	(United Kingdom) Tom Onslow-Cole	(United Kingdom) Tom Onslow-Cole	Total Control Racing
6	R12	Donington Park (National), Leicestershire	29–30 July	(United Kingdom) Tom Onslow-Cole	(United Kingdom) Martin Byford	(United Kingdom) Paul Rivett	Boulevard Team Racing
7	R13	Snetterton Motor Racing Circuit, Norfolk	12–13 August	(United Kingdom) Martin Byford	(United Kingdom) Steven Hunter	(United Kingdom) Martin Byford	Z Speed Racing
7	R14	Snetterton Motor Racing Circuit, Norfolk	12–13 August	(United Kingdom) Martin Byford	(United Kingdom) Martin Byford	(United Kingdom) Martin Byford	Z Speed Racing
8	R15	Donington Park (GP), Leicestershire	9–10 September	(United Kingdom) Martin Byford	(United Kingdom) Paul Rivett	(United Kingdom) Martin Byford	Z Speed Racing
8	R16	Donington Park (GP), Leicestershire	9–10 September	(United Kingdom) Tom Onslow-Cole	(Austria) Niki Lanik	(United Kingdom) Mark Speller	Total Control Racing
9	R17	Brands Hatch (Indy), Kent	23–24 September	(United Kingdom) Paul Rivett	(United Kingdom) Martin Byford	(United Kingdom) Tom Onslow-Cole	Total Control Racing
9	R18	Brands Hatch (Indy), Kent	23–24 September	(United Kingdom) Paul Rivett	(United Kingdom) Tom Onslow-Cole	(United Kingdom) Paul Rivett	Boulevard Team Racing
10	R19	Silverstone Circuit (National), Northamptonshire	14–15 October	(United Kingdom) Tom Onslow-Cole	(United Kingdom) Tom Onslow-Cole	(United Kingdom) Tom Onslow-Cole	Total Control Racing
10	R20	Silverstone Circuit (National), Northamptonshire	14–15 October	(United Kingdom) Tom Onslow-Cole	(United Kingdom) Nick Adcock	(United Kingdom) Tom Onslow-Cole	Total Control Racing

== Standings ==
Points were awarded on a 32, 28, 25, 22, 20, 18, 16, 14, 12, 11, 10, 9, 8, 7, 6, 5, 4, 3, 2, 1 basis to the top 20 finishers in each race, with 2 bonus points for the fastest lap in each race. A driver's best 18 scores counted towards the championship.

=== Drivers' Championship ===
Pos	Driver	BHI		OUL		THR		KNO		CRO		DON		SNE		DON		BHI		SIL		Total	Drop	Pen	Pts
1	(United Kingdom) Tom Onslow-Cole	1	2	1	2	1	3	1	2	1	1	1	Ret	Ret	5	2	4	1	3	1	1	546			546
2	(United Kingdom) Paul Rivett	3	1	Ret	1	4	2	DSQ	1	13	5	2	1	2	2	4	3	5	1	4	Ret	440		7^{1}	433
3	(United Kingdom) Stephen Colbert	4	10	9	6	3	4	2	5	6	10	6	5	4	4	5	5	2	Ret	5	3	382	11		371
4	(United Kingdom) Michael Doyle	5	Ret	5	7	5	7	7	Ret	4	Ret	8	4	8	3	3	15	4	4	8	9	306		2^{2}	304
5	(United Kingdom) Martin Byford											4	2	1	1	1	2	3	2	2	2	289			289
6	(United Kingdom) Nick Adcock	Ret	3	2	3	6	Ret	3	6	2	2	5	Ret	9	8	Ret	Ret	Ret	DNS	3	5	290		8^{3}	282
7	(United Kingdom) Robert Lawson	8	6	6	11	7	5	Ret	8	5	6	Ret	DNS	3	6	11	12	6	5	9	7	276			276
8	(United Kingdom) Phil House	Ret	7	3	5	Ret	11	4	3	7	7	Ret	6	5	Ret	Ret	11	7	6	11	4	264		2^{4}	262
9	(United Kingdom) James Williams	7	5	DNS	DNS	9	10	10	9	9	9	7	3	12	14	8	7	11	9	6	8	247			247
10	(United Kingdom) Mark Speller	6	Ret	7	10	8	8	13	4	3	3	Ret	12	6	13	10	1	10	Ret	Ret	DNS	242			242
11	(United Kingdom) Steven Hunter	2	Ret	4	4	2	1	6	7	NC	4	3	Ret	Ret	Ret							215		2^{5}	213
12	(United Kingdom) Martin Johnson	9	NC	10	Ret	10	9	8	13	10	8	Ret	13	7	11	7	8	8	Ret	14	10	189			189
13	(United Kingdom) Mel Healey	10	8	11	13	11	12	11	11	11	13	11	7	13	12	13	13	13	10	10	Ret	189	8		181
14	(United Kingdom) Mark Hunt	Ret	Ret	8	12	Ret	6	9	10	8	12	9	11	Ret	9	6	10	9	7			178			178
15	(Austria) Niki Lanik											10	10	14	7	9	6	12	8	7	6	134			134
16	(United Kingdom) Alan Taylor					12	13	12	14	12	11	13	9	11	15	DNS	Ret	14	11	13	11	123			123
17	(United Kingdom) Steve Wood											12	8	10	10	Ret	14			Ret	Ret	52			52
18	(United Kingdom) Ray MacDowall							5	12							Ret	9					41			41
19	(United Kingdom) Mark Fell	Ret	4	Ret	9																	34			34
20	(United Kingdom) Marc Nelson	Ret	11	12	14	13	Ret															34			34
21	(United Kingdom) Gary Robertshaw	Ret	9	Ret	8																	26			26
22	(Republic of Ireland) Richie Faulkner															12	Ret					9			9
23	(United Kingdom) James Clarkson																			12	Ret	9			9
NC	(United Kingdom) Gavin Seager	Ret	DNS																			0			0
Pos	Driver	BHI		OUL		THR		KNO		CRO		DON		SNE		DON		BHI		SIL		Total	Drop	Pen	Pts

Colour	Result
Gold	Winner
Silver	Second place
Bronze	Third place
Green	Points classification
Blue	Non-points classification
Blue	Non-classified finish (NC)
Purple	Retired, not classified (Ret)
Red	Did not qualify (DNQ)
Red	Did not pre-qualify (DNPQ)
Black	Disqualified (DSQ)
White	Did not start (DNS)
White	Withdrew (WD)
White	Race cancelled (C)
Blank	Did not practice (DNP)
Blank	Did not arrive (DNA)
Blank	Excluded (EX)

Notes:

1. - Paul Rivett was docked points at the first Brands Hatch meeting and Knockhill.
2. - Michael Doyle was docked points at Oulton Park.
3. - Nick Adcock was docked points at Knockhill and the first Donington Park meeting.
4. - Phil House was docked points at the first Donington Park meeting.
5. - Steven Hunter was docked points at the first Donington Park meeting.

=== Entrants' Championship ===
Points were awarded on the same scale as the drivers' championship but without the fastest lap bonus. An entrant's two highest placed cars in each race scored points and all scores counted towards the championship.

Pos	Entrant	BHI		OUL		THR		KNO		CRO		DON		SNE		DON		BHI		SIL		Pts
1	Total Control Racing	1	2	1	2	1	3	1	2	1	1	1	3	6	5	2	1	1	3	1	1	962
1	Total Control Racing	6	3	2	3	6	8	3	4	2	2	5	12	9	8	8	4	10	9	3	5	962
2	JHR Racing Developments	2	7	3	4	2	1	4	3	4	4	3	4	5	3	3	11	4	4	8	4	753
2	JHR Racing Developments	5	Ret	4	5	5	7	6	7	7	7	8	6	8	10	Ret	14	7	6	11	9	753
3	Mardi Gras Motorsport	4	4	6	6	3	4	2	5	5	6	6	5	3	4	5	5	2	5	5	3	671
3	Mardi Gras Motorsport	8	6	9	9	7	5	Ret	8	6	10	Ret	DNS	4	6	11	12	6	Ret	9	7	671
4	Boulevard Team Racing	3	1	10	1	4	2	8	1	10	5	2	1	2	2	4	3	5	1	4	10	624
4	Boulevard Team Racing	9	NC	Ret	Ret	10	9	DSQ	13	13	8	Ret	13	7	11	7	8	8	Ret	12	Ret	624
5	Team Pyro	10	8	8	12	11	6	9	10	8	12	9	7	13	9	6	10	9	7	10	Ret	367
5	Team Pyro	Ret	Ret	11	13	Ret	12	11	11	11	13	11	11	Ret	12	13	13	13	10			367
6	Z Speed Racing											4	2	1	1	1	2	3	2	2	2	283
7	Robertshaw Racing	Ret	9	Ret	8	12	13	12	14	12	11	13	9	11	15	DNS	Ret	14	11	13	11	149
8	Drive 4 Life with SVE											10	10	14	7	9	6	12	8	7	6	132
9	Double Six Racing with SVE	Ret	11	12	14	13	Ret															34
NC	Seager Home Solutions with SVE	Ret	DNS																			0
Pos	Entrant	BHI		OUL		THR		KNO		CRO		DON		SNE		DON		BHI		SIL		Pts

== Winter Cup ==
The Winter Cup was contested over two rounds at Brands Hatch on 4–5 November and Croft on 11 November. It was won by Niki Lanik driving for Drive 4 Life with SVE.

Due to low grid numbers, the Clios raced simultaneously with other series at both events (Classic Touring Cars at Brands Hatch and Northern Sports Saloons at Croft).

=== Teams & Drivers ===
Team	No.	Drivers	Rounds
Total Control Racing	2	(United Kingdom) Ray MacDowall	All
Total Control Racing	19	(United Kingdom) James Williams	All
Drive 4 Life with SVE	4	(Austria) Niki Lanik	All
Boulevard Team Racing	7	(United Kingdom) Martin Johnson	All
Boulevard Team Racing	14	(United Kingdom) Joshua Brooks	All
IF Motorsport	13	(United Kingdom) Alex Fergusson	All

=== Calendar & Winners ===
Round		Venue	Date	Pole position	Fastest lap	Winning driver	Winning team
1	R1	Brands Hatch (Indy), Kent	4–5 November	(Austria) Niki Lanik	(Austria) Niki Lanik	(Austria) Niki Lanik	Drive 4 Life with SVE
1	R2	Brands Hatch (Indy), Kent	4–5 November	(Austria) Niki Lanik	(United Kingdom) Martin Johnson	(Austria) Niki Lanik	Drive 4 Life with SVE
2	R3	Croft Circuit, North Yorkshire	11 November	(Austria) Niki Lanik	(Austria) Niki Lanik	(Austria) Niki Lanik	Drive 4 Life with SVE
2	R4	Croft Circuit, North Yorkshire	11 November	(Austria) Niki Lanik	(United Kingdom) Martin Johnson	(United Kingdom) Ray MacDowall	Total Control Racing

=== Drivers' Championship ===
Points were awarded on the same scale as the main championship. All scores counted.

Pos	Driver	BHI		CRO		Pts
1	(Austria) Niki Lanik	1	1	1	2	128
2	(United Kingdom) Martin Johnson	3	3	3	3	104
3	(United Kingdom) Ray MacDowall	5	2	4	1	102
4	(United Kingdom) James Williams	2	4	2	5	98
5	(United Kingdom) Alex Fergusson	4	5	5	4	84
6	(United Kingdom) Joshua Brooks	DNS	6	DNS	DNS	18
Pos	Driver	BHI		CRO		Pts
