= Tom Onslow-Cole =

British racing driver (born 1987)

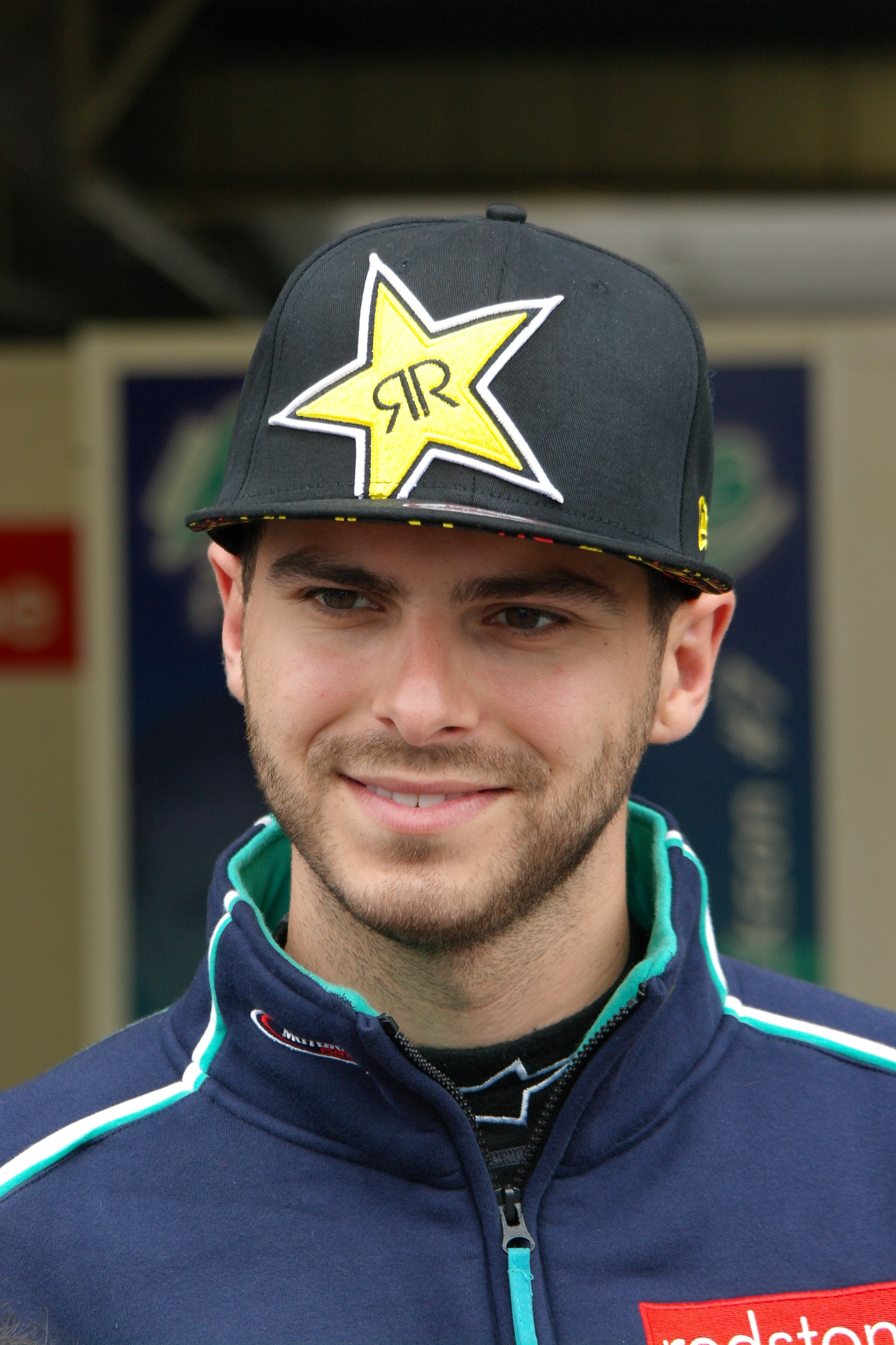
- Onslow-Cole at the Silverstone round of the 2013 British Touring Car Championship season
- Nationality: (United Kingdom) British
- Born: Thomas Michael Onslow-Cole; 16 May 1987 (age 39) Kingston, England

British Touring Car Championship career
- Debut season: 2007
- Current team: RCIB Insurance with Fox Transport
- Categorisation: FIA Silver (until 2016); FIA Gold (2017–)
- Car number: 38
- Former teams: Airwaves Racing eBay Motors; Team Aon; AmD Milltek Racing; VX Racing
- Starts: 195
- Wins: 7
- Poles: 5
- Fastest laps: 13
- Best finish: 4th in 2010

Previous series
- 2012 2004–06 2002: Superstars Series; Renault Clio Cup UK; T Cars

Championship titles
- 2018-19 2015 2006: International GT Open – Pro-Am; 24 Hour Series; Renault Clio Cup UK

Awards
- Ram Racing 2015 – 1st in class 24H Paul Ricard 24H Brno Scuduri Praha 2016 – 5th in class 24H Brno

Thomas Michael Onslow-Cole (born 16 May 1987 in Kingston, Surrey) is a British former racing driver. He won the International GT Open in Pro-Am category in 2018 and in 2019 and the 24H Series in 2015.

It was announced in April 2014 that Onslow-Cole would not be returning to the British Touring Car Championship for 2014 and instead entered the British GT Championship driving in a factory-supported Aston Martin V12 Vantage GT3. In 2015, Onslow-Cole won the GT3 class of the 24H Series after taking a podium at every round, including a second place at Dubai 24 Hours and a race win in the inaugural 24 Hours of Paul Ricard. In 2016, he entered various 24H Series events in the Ferrari 488 GT3 and Mercedes AMG GT3, winning the 24 Hours of Brno and taking third at Paul Ricard. He also raced for Team Parker Racing in the Bentley Continental GT3 in the Blancpain Endurance Series Pro-Am class. This year, he has a BMW factory contract for the Nurburgring 24 Hours and will contest Le Mans Cup, GT Open and various 24H Series races in the Mercedes AMG GT3.

== Career ==
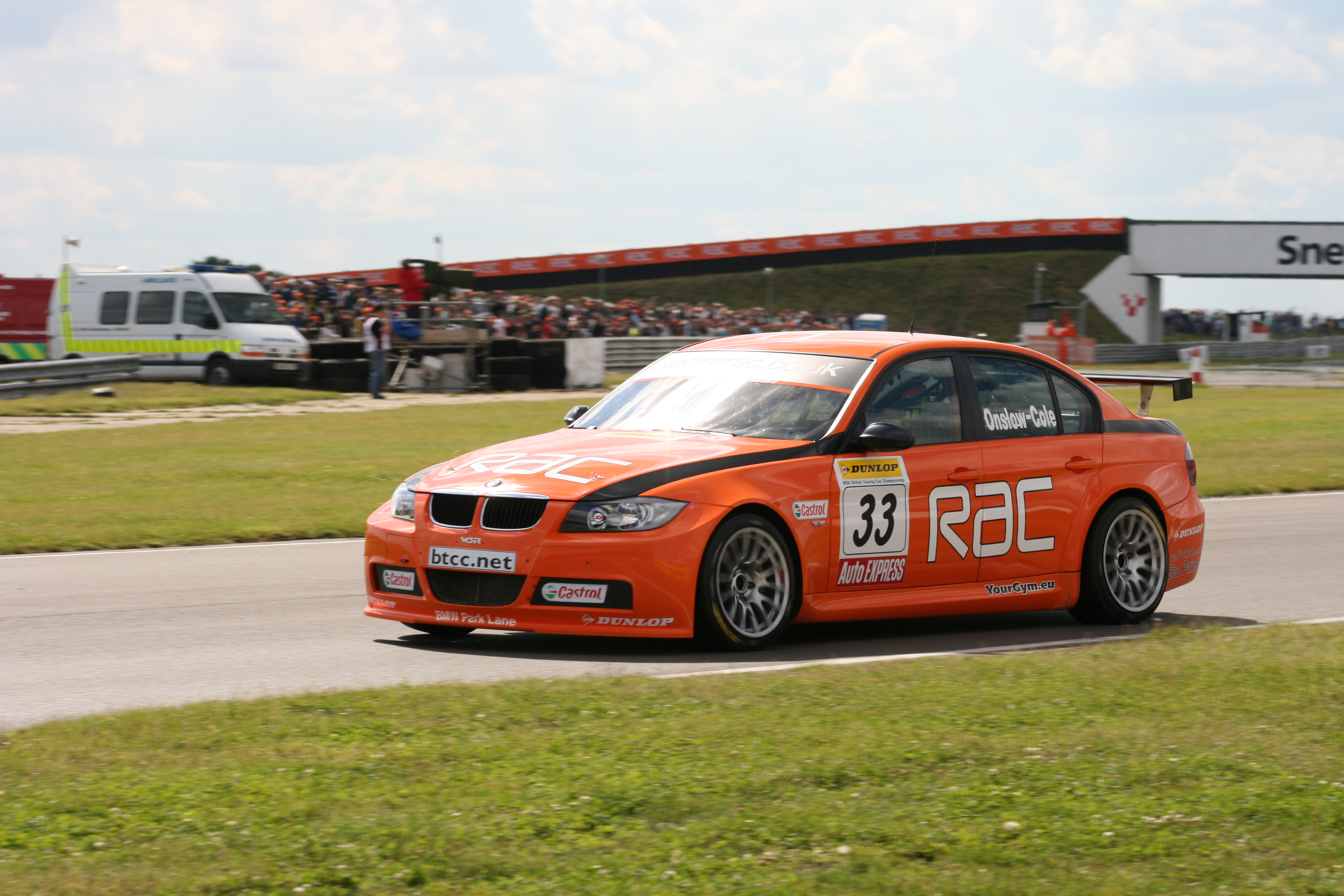
Onslow-Cole at Snetterton in 2007, the scene of his first British Touring Car Championship win.

=== Team RAC (2007) ===
Onslow-Cole began his career in karting at the age of eight. He was the 2006 Renault Clio Cup champion, winning the title by 113 points from his nearest rival. This allowed him to graduate to the BTCC for the 2007 season. He finished tenth overall in the championship standings for West Surrey Racing after recording four podiums, including his maiden victory at Snetterton.

=== VX Racing (2008) ===
In 2008, Vauxhall acquired his services and placed him into the third Vectra along with previous champions of the series, Fabrizio Giovanardi (2007) and Matt Neal (2005 & 2006). He took pole position for round 3 at Donington Park, leading race 1 until dropping to third through an off-track excursion. He was also strong in race 3, before being hit by Giovanardi, but recovered to finish third. He recorded another pole at Thruxton and followed this up with his first two wins of the season in races 1 and 2. He would go on to finish a career best sixth in the championship, scoring 170 points with two wins and nine podiums, including five podiums in succession.

=== Team Aon (2009–2011) ===
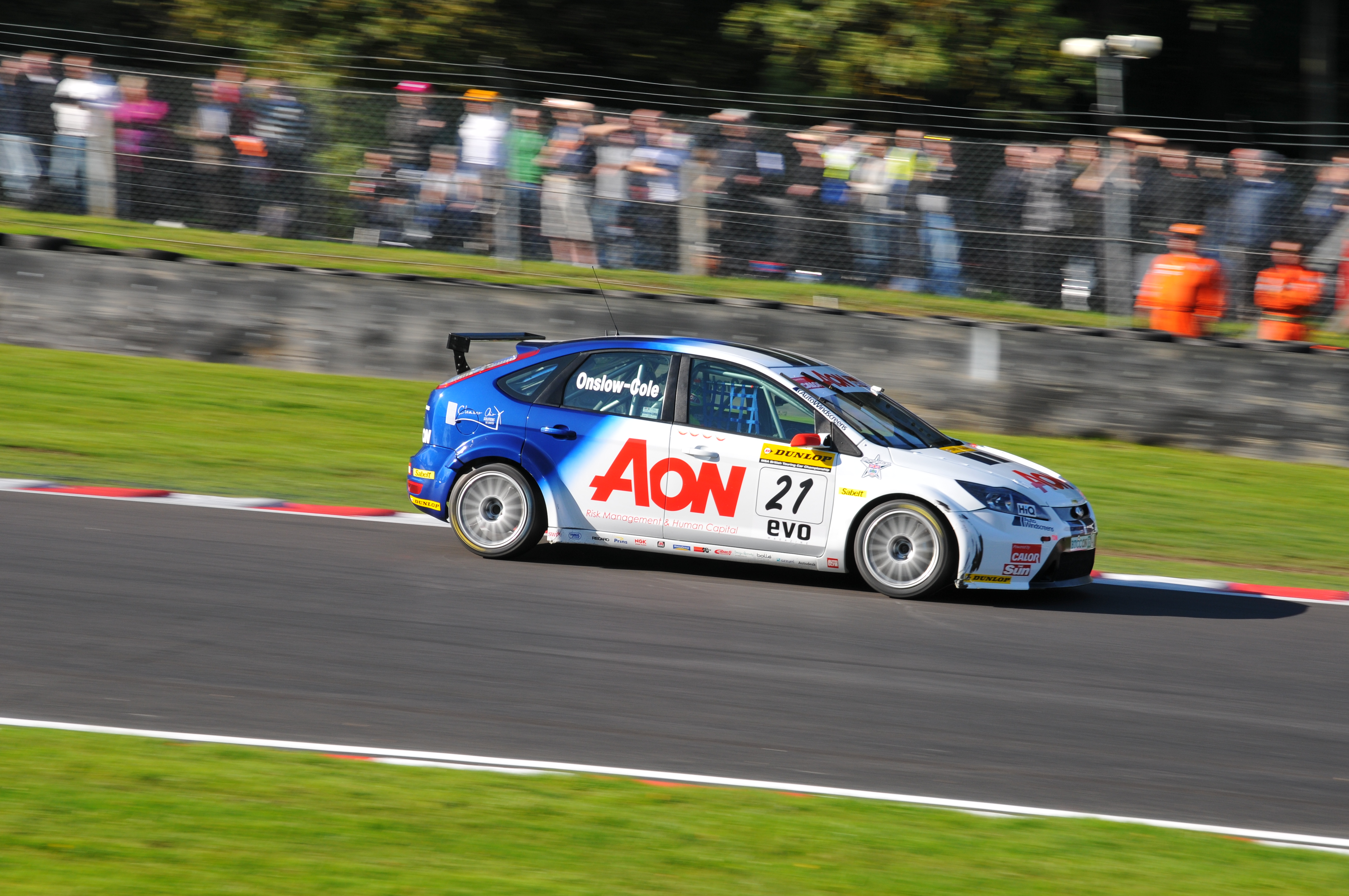
Onslow-Cole driving the Team Aon Ford Focus ST at Brands Hatch during the 2010 British Touring Car Championship season.

Having been replaced at VX Racing by Andrew Jordan, Onslow-Cole started 2009 without a drive. He drove the medical car during the second BTCC meeting of the season, at Thruxton.

Onslow-Cole was brought in by Team Aon to replace Alan Morrison ahead of the round at Croft, where he was due to drive the medical car once again. He had to use Morrison's race suit and seat. He rejoined the team later in the season for the final three rounds, before signing for the team full-time for 2010.

In 2010, Team Aon's Fords are powered by liquefied petroleum gas, and Onslow-Cole was confident of a title push pre-season and the team claimed four of the season's first five pole positions. His first win of the season was awarded to him after Chilton was excluded from the results at Brands Hatch due to a technical infringement; holding off Gordon Shedden by 0.009 seconds, the closest finish in BTCC history. By midseason, other teams and drivers were complaining about their apparent straightline speed advantage. Onslow-Cole scored stronger results than team-mate Tom Chilton early in the season, but in the first two races at Silverstone, Onslow-Cole moved over when leading to allow Chilton to take the victories. Chilton's father is responsible for the team's sponsorship from Aon Corporation, but Onslow-Cole was able to win the third race.

In 2011, Onslow-Cole raced a NGTC-powered, Super 2000-specification Volkswagen Golf in the British Touring Car Championship, with AmD Milltek Racing. It was announced on ITV4's live coverage on 5 June 2011 that he had parted company with the team, after the second race at Oulton Park. Onslow-Cole has returned to Team Aon to drive the third 'Global' Ford Focus alongside 2010 team-mate Chilton and Andy Neate.

=== eBay Motors (2012) ===
With Team Aon having left to go to the World Touring Car Championship, Onslow-Cole had to look elsewhere for a drive in 2012. In February 2012, it was announced that he would join eBay Motors, the team for which under a different guise he made his BTCC debut with in 2007. He finished on the podium for his first race back with the team at Brands Hatch. He went on to claim a further six podiums leading him to sixth in the Drivers Standings.

=== Team HARD. (2013) ===
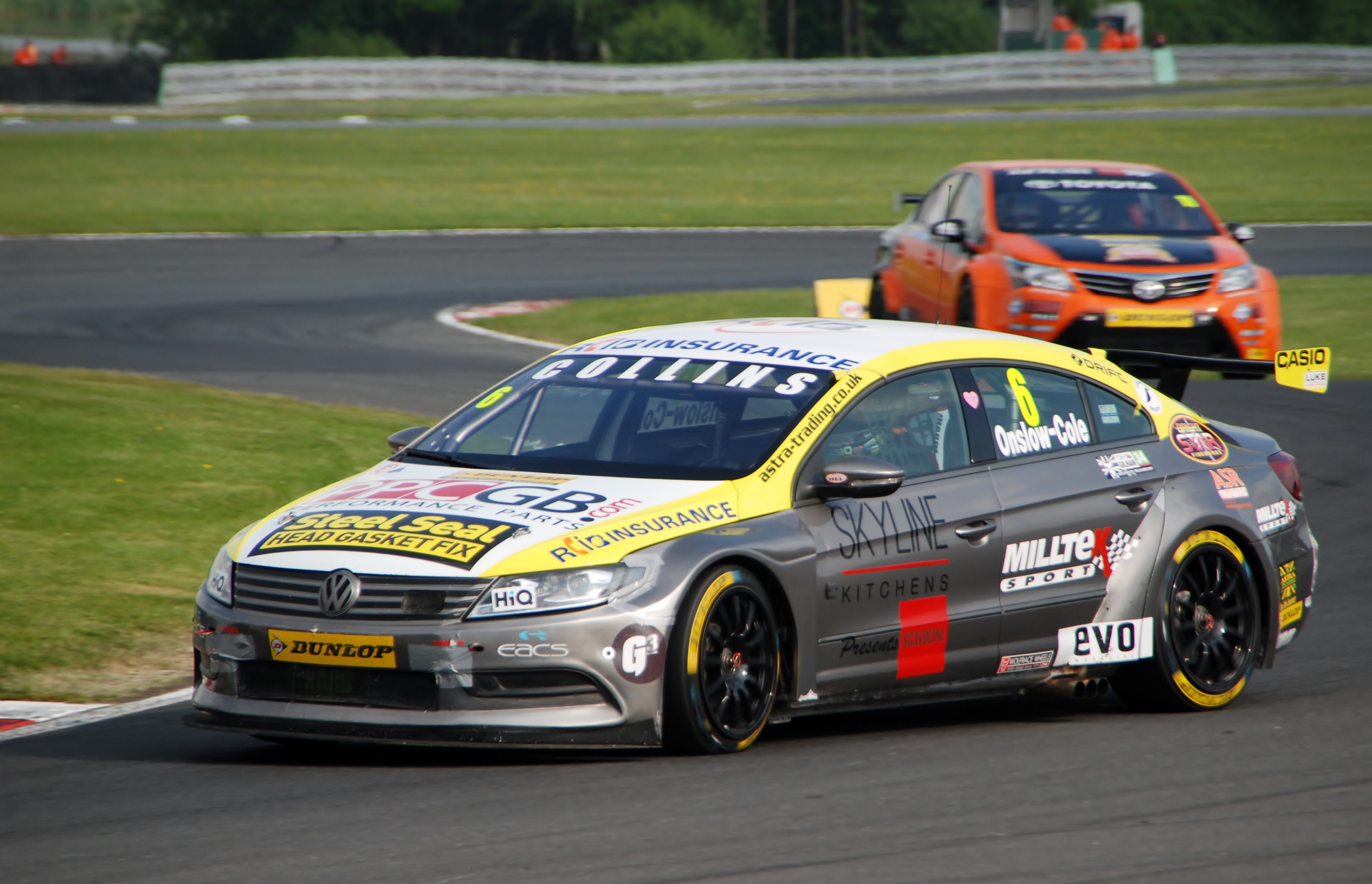
Onslow-Cole driving the Team HARD Volkswagen CC at Oulton Park during the 2013 British Touring Car Championship season.

In January 2013, it was confirmed that Onslow-Cole would drive an NGTC Volkswagen CC for Team HARD. in the 2013 season in a three-year deal. He took his first podium for the team at Thruxton where he finished third in race one and then he finished second in race two, his best result of the season. He decided to miss the final three rounds of the season. at this stage he was placed tenth in the Championship.

=== Motorbase Performance (2013) ===
In September 2013, Onslow-Cole joined Motorbase Performance under their Airwaves Racing banner for the final three rounds of the 2013 season in a bid to improve the team's points tally in the constructors Standings. He achieved a best result of 4th and finished the year 12th in the Drivers Standings.

=== Strata21 (2014) ===
In April 2014, it was announced that Onslow-Cole would switch from touring cars to GTs, partnering Paul White in the 2014 British GT Championship for the Strata21 team, initially in a Nissan GT-R Nismo GT3 before switching to an Aston Martin Vantage GT3. The pairing managed to finish every round of the championship and scored their first podium finish in the series when they finished third in the second race at the championship's Snetterton meeting.

=== Ram Racing (2015) ===
Onslow-Cole remained in GTs for 2015, joining Ram Racing to race a Mercedes-Benz SLS AMG GT3 in the 24H Series, and taking second places at the Dubai 24 Hours and the 12 Hours of Mugello before scoring his first win in the series at the 24 Hours of Paul Ricard. Ram Racing won their overall class and Onslow-Cole won his maiden GT championship. Outside of GT racing Onslow-Cole won the MSA RX Talent Search at Lydden Hill in May 2015, securing a drive in the RX Lites support race at the World RX of Turkey at Istanbul Park in October 2015. He went on finish in third place overall in his rallycross debut and hopes to contest more rounds with the support of sponsor Rockstar Energy Drink. That same year, he won the Aston Martin festival at Le Mans.

=== Bentley Team Parker Racing (2016) ===
For 2016, Onslow-Cole signed for Team Parker Racing racing a Bentley Continental GT3 competing in the Blaincpain Endurance Championship for selected rounds. He also had various outings in the 24H Series once more. On 16 October 2016 he won the 24H race of Brno racing a Ferrari 488 GT3 for Scuduri Praha. He also made a one off appearance in the VLN Endurance Championship at the Nurburgring racing a Toyota GT 86 CS Cup-Car for Team TMG. He qualified fourth and finished the race third in class.

=== BMW Motorsport (2017) ===
In 2017, Onslow-Cole will make his debut as a BMW factory driver when he takes on Nürburgring 24 Hours in the M6 GT3. He will prepare for the event by contesting VLN1, VLN2 and the qualifying race with the team. He will also contest the Le Mans Cup with RAM Racing and GT Open with sps automotive performance, both in the Mercedes AMG GT3.

== Racing record ==
=== Complete International GT Open results ===
Pos.	Team	Teammate	Class	1	2	3	4	5	6	7	8	9	10	11	12	13	14	Pos	Points
2018	(Germany) SPS Automotive Performance	(Germany) Valentin Pierburg	**Pro-Am**	EST; 1; 1	EST; 2; 6	LEC; 1; 1	LEC; 2 Ret	SPA; 1; 1	SPA; 2; 3	HUN; 1; 1	HUN; 2; 10	SIL; 1; 11	SIL; 2; 1	MNZ; 1; 6	MNZ; 2; 7	CAT; 1; 1	CAT; 2; 3	**1st**	78
2019	(Germany) SPS Automotive Performance	(Germany) Valentin Pierburg	**Pro-Am**	LEC; 1; 1	LEC; 2; 8	HOC; 1; 2	HOC; 2; 4	SPA; 1; 4	SPA; 2; 1	RBR; 1; 5	RBR; 2; 1	SIL; 1; 2	SIL; 2; 3	CAT; 1; 5	CAT; 2; 6	MNZ; 1; 6	MNZ; 2; 2	**1st**	80

=== Complete 24H Series results ===
Pos.	Team	Teammate	Class	1	2	3	4	5	6	Pos	Points
2015	(United Kingdom) Ram Racing	(Germany) Thomas Jäger	**A6-Pro**	DUB; 2	MUG (2)	ZAN; 2	LEC; 1	CAT; 3	BRN; 2	**1st**	117
2016	(United Kingdom) Ram Racing	(Germany) Thomas Jäger	**A6-Pro**	DUB; 11	MUG; Ret	SIL	ZAN; 4			**5th**	68
2016	(Germany) SPS Automotive Performance	(Germany) Valentin Pierburg	**A6-Pro**					LEC; 3		**5th**	68
2016	(Czech Republic) Scuderia Praha	(Czech Republic) Josef Král (Netherlands) Peter Kox (Czech Republic) Jiří Písařík	**A6-Pro**						BRN; 1	**5th**	68

=== Complete British Touring Car Championship results ===
(key) (Races in bold indicate pole position – 1 point awarded in first race) (Races in italics indicate fastest lap – 1 point awarded all races) (* signifies that driver lead race for at least one lap – 1 point awarded all races)

Year	Team	Car	1	2	3	4	5	6	7	8	9	10	11	12	13	14	15	16	17	18	19	20	21	22	23	24	25	26	27	28	29	30	Pos	Pts
2007	Team RAC	BMW 320si	BRH; 1; 5	BRH; 2; 15	BRH; 3; 6	ROC; 1; 8	ROC; 2; 2	ROC; 3 Ret	THR; 1; 8	THR; 2; 7	THR; 3; 10	CRO; 1 Ret	CRO; 2; 7	CRO; 3; 2*	OUL; 1; 9	OUL; 2; 13	OUL; 3; 7	DON; 1; 10	DON; 2; 11	DON; 3; 8	SNE; 1; 2	SNE; 2; 6	**SNE**; **3**; 1*	BRH; 1; 5	BRH; 2 Ret	BRH; 3; 6	KNO; 1 DSQ	KNO; 2; 13	KNO; 3; 10	THR; 1; 10	THR; 2; 10	THR; 3 Ret	10th	109
2008	VX Racing	Vauxhall Vectra	BRH; 1; 7	BRH; 2; 6	BRH; 3 Ret	ROC; 1; 7	ROC; 2; 5	ROC; 3 Ret	**DON**; **1**; 3*	DON; 2; 3	DON; 3; 2	**THR**; **1**; 1*	**THR**; **2**; 1*	THR; 3; 7	CRO; 1; 19	CRO; 2; 11	CRO; 3; 7	SNE; 1; 6	SNE; 2; 14	SNE; 3; 5	OUL; 1; 5	OUL; 2; 3	OUL; 3; 11	KNO; 1; 3	KNO; 2; 3	KNO; 3; 12	SIL; 1; 11	SIL; 2; 6	SIL; 3; 6*	BRH; 1; 9	BRH; 2; 8	**BRH**; **3**; 3	6th	170
2009	Team Aon	Ford Focus ST	BRH; 1	BRH; 2	BRH; 3	THR; 1	THR; 2	THR; 3	DON; 1	DON; 2	DON; 3	OUL; 1	OUL; 2	OUL; 3	CRO; 1 Ret	CRO; 2 NC	CRO; 3 Ret	SNE; 1	SNE; 2	SNE; 3	KNO; 1	KNO; 2	KNO; 3	SIL; 1 Ret	SIL; 2; 13	SIL; 3; 14	ROC; 1; 14	ROC; 2 Ret	ROC; 3; 9	BRH; 1; 13	BRH; 2; 9	BRH; 3; 12	21st	4
2010	Team Aon	Ford Focus ST LPG	THR; 1; 13	THR; 2; 12	THR; 3; 7	ROC; 1; 8	ROC; 2; 7	ROC; 3; 7	BRH; 1; 3	BRH; 2; 1*	BRH; 3; 10	**OUL**; **1**; 1*	**OUL**; **2**; 3*	OUL; 3; 5	CRO; 1; 8	CRO; 2; 5	CRO; 3; 2	SNE; 1; 6	SNE; 2; 3	SNE; 3; 16	**SIL**; **1**; 2*	SIL; 2; 3*	SIL; 3; 1*	KNO; 1; 7	KNO; 2; 7	**KNO**; **3**; 2*	DON; 1; 8*	DON; 2; 1*	DON; 3; 9	BRH; 1 Ret	BRH; 2 Ret	BRH; 3 Ret	4th	200
2011	AmD Milltek Racing.com	Volkswagen Golf	BRH; 1; 13	BRH; 2 Ret	BRH; 3; 12	DON; 1; 11	DON; 2; 7	DON; 3 Ret	THR; 1; 7	THR; 2 DNS	THR; 3; 10	OUL; 1; 11	OUL; 2; 16	OUL; 3 DNS																			13th	61
2011	Team Aon	Ford Focus													CRO; 1; 11	CRO; 2; 10	CRO; 3; 13	SNE; 1; 8	SNE; 2; 8	SNE; 3; 11	KNO; 1 Ret	KNO; 2; 11	KNO; 3; 8	ROC; 1; 19	ROC; 2; 12	ROC; 3 Ret	BRH; 1; 5	BRH; 2; 3	BRH; 3; 7	SIL; 1; 4	SIL; 2; 3	SIL; 3; 7	13th	61
2012	eBay Motors	BMW 320si	BRH; 1; 3	BRH; 2; 10	BRH; 3 Ret	DON; 1; 5	DON; 2; 10	DON; 3; 9	THR; 1; 8	THR; 2; 13	THR; 3; 10	OUL; 1 Ret	OUL; 2; 9	**OUL**; **3**; 3*	CRO; 1; 7	CRO; 2; 6	CRO; 3; 2	SNE; 1; 6	SNE; 2; 7	SNE; 3; 2	KNO; 1; 2*	KNO; 2; 2	KNO; 3; 5	ROC; 1; 8	ROC; 2; 14	ROC; 3; 7	SIL; 1; 10	SIL; 2; 6	SIL; 3; 5	**BRH**; **1**; 3*	BRH; 2; 15*	BRH; 3; 10	6th	281
2013	PPCGB.com/Kraftwerk Racing	Volkswagen CC	BRH; 1; 14	BRH; 2 Ret	BRH; 3; 16	DON; 1; 13	DON; 2; 10	**DON**; **3**; 6	THR; 1; 3	THR; 2; 2	THR; 3; 4	OUL; 1; 15	OUL; 2; 11	OUL; 3 Ret	CRO; 1; 10	CRO; 2; 3	CRO; 3; 12	SNE; 1; 12	SNE; 2; 9	SNE; 3; 17	KNO; 1; 13	KNO; 2; 13	KNO; 3 Ret										12th	152
2013	Airwaves Racing	Ford Focus ST Mk.III																						ROC; 1 Ret	ROC; 2; 9	ROC; 3; 12	SIL; 1; 15	SIL; 2 Ret	SIL; 3; 13	BRH; 1; 4	BRH; 2; 9	BRH; 3; 13	12th	152
2020	RCIB Insurance with Fox Transport	Volkswagen CC	DON; 1	DON; 2	DON; 3	BRH; 1	BRH; 2	BRH; 3	OUL; 1	OUL; 2	OUL; 3	KNO; 1	KNO; 2	KNO; 3	THR; 1; 21	THR; 2; 21	THR; 3; 19	SIL; 1; 19	SIL; 2; 18	SIL; 3; 19	CRO; 1	CRO; 2	CRO; 3	SNE; 1	SNE; 2	SNE; 3	BRH; 1	BRH; 2	BRH; 3				31st	0

=== Complete International Superstars Series results ===
(key) (Races in bold indicate pole position) (Races in italics indicate fastest lap)

Year	Team	Car	1	2	3	4	5	6	7	8	9	10	11	12	13	14	15	16	DC	Points
2012	Ferlito Motors	Jaguar XFR	MNZ; 1	MNZ; 2	IMO; 1	IMO; 2	DON; 1; 18	DON; 2 Ret	MUG; 1	MUG; 2	HUN; 1	HUN; 2	SPA; 1	SPA; 2	VAL; 1	VAL; 2	PER; 1	PER; 2	41st	2

=== Complete British GT Championship results ===
(key) (Races in bold indicate pole position) (Races in italics indicate fastest lap)

Year	Team	Car	Class	1	2	3	4	5	6	7	8	9	10	DC	Points
2014	Strata 21	Nissan GT-R GT3	GT3	OUL; 1; 16	OUL; 2; 16									10th	53.5
2014	Strata 21	Aston Martin V12 Vantage GT3	GT3			ROC; 1; 4	SIL; 1; 10	SNE; 1; 9	SNE; 2; 3	SPA; 1; 14	SPA; 2; 6	BRH; 1; 7	DON; 1; 21	10th	53.5
2018	Ram Racing	Mercedes-AMG GT3	GT3	OUL; 1	OUL; 2	ROC; 1	SNE; 1	SNE; 2	SIL; 1	SPA; 1; 9	BRH; 1	DON; 1		NC†	0†
2019	Team ABBA Racing	Mercedes-AMG GT3	GT3	OUL; 1	OUL; 2	SNE; 1	SNE; 2	SIL; 1	DON; 1; 14	SPA; 1	BRH; 1; 6	DON; 1		19th	12
2021	Ram Racing	Mercedes-AMG GT3	GT3	BRH; 1	SIL; 1	DON; 1	SPA; 1	SNE; 1	SNE; 2	OUL; 1; 1	OUL; 2; 21	DON; 1		NC†	0†

^{†} As Onslow-Cole was a guest driver, he was ineligible to score points.

=== Complete FIA World Rallycross Championship results ===
==== RX Lites Cup ====
Year	Entrant	Car	1	2	3	4	5	6	7	Position	Points
2015	Olsbergs MSE	Lites Ford Fiesta	POR	GBR	SWE	NOR	BAR	TUR; 3	ITA	13th	22

=== Complete GT World Challenge Europe Sprint Cup results ===
(key) (Races in bold indicate pole position) (Races in italics indicate fastest lap)

Year	Team	Car	Class	1	2	3	4	5	6	7	8	9	10	Pos.	Points
2020	SPS Automotive Performance	Mercedes-AMG GT3 Evo	Pro-Am	MIS; 1; 14	MIS; 2; 18	MIS; 3 DNS	MAG; 1	MAG; 2	ZAN; 1	ZAN; 2	CAT; 1	CAT; 2	CAT; 3	8th	15

Sporting positions
Preceded by Jonathan Adam	Renault Clio Cup United Kingdom; Champion; 2006	Succeeded by Martin Byford
Preceded by Shaun Balfe; Rob Bell	International GT Open; Pro-Am Champion; 2018-2019; With: Valentin Pierburg	Succeeded by Marcelo Hahn
