= 1985 British Formula Three Championship =

1985 British Formula 3 International Series

Seasons
- ← 1984 1986 →

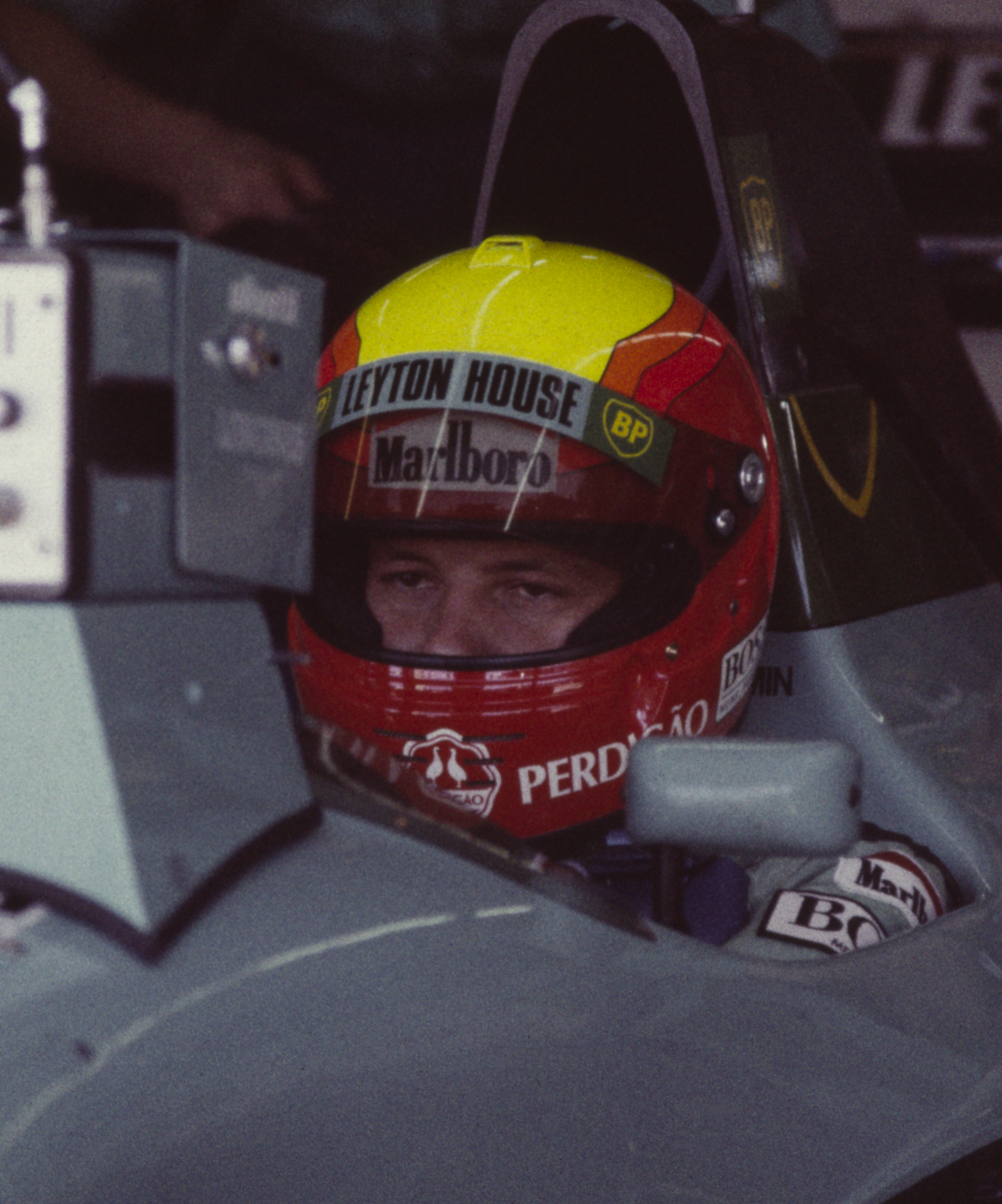
1985 champion, Maurício Gugelmin

The 1985 British Formula Three Championship was the 35th season of the British Formula Three Championship. Maurício Gugelmin took the BARC/BRDC Marlboro British Formula 3 Championship.

Formula Three witnessed three major changes in 1985; in an attempt to eliminate ground effect, flat-bottomed cars became mandatory; the cancellation of the FIA European Formula Three Championship; and the arrival of Reynard Motorsport, giving Ralt a real rival for the first time since 1981.

Reynard driver, Russell Spence led at the mid-season break with 55 pts, from Andy Wallace on 50, Maurício Gugelmin on 41 and Tim Davies with another Reynard on 34.

Ralt drivers later took over: Gerrit van Kouwan won three races after the break and notched up 40 pts.; Dave Scott won twice, scoring 36 pts. Gugelmin’s Ralt was sorted by West Surrey Racing’s Dick Bennetts and with two races remaining, he held a narrow two points lead in the title race on 66 pts., from both Spence and Wallace, tied on 64pts. All the momentum was with the man from Joinville, Brazil, and Gugelmin won both these easily to win the Championship.

The scoring system was 9-6-4-3-2-1 points for the first six positions, with 1 (one) extra point added to the driver who set the fastest lap of the race.

== BARC/BRDC Marlboro British F3 Championship ==
Champion: (Brazil) Maurício Gugelmin

Runner Up: (United Kingdom) Andy Wallace

Class B Champion: (Jamaica) Carlton Tingling

== Results ==
=== Marlboro British Formula 3 Championship ===
| Date | Round | Circuit | Winning driver | Winning team | Winning car |
|---|---|---|---|---|---|
| 03/03/1985 | Rd.1 | (United Kingdom) Silverstone (National) | (United Kingdom) Andy Wallace | Swallow Racing | Reynard-Volkswagen 853 |
| 10/03/1985 | Rd.2 | (United Kingdom) Thruxton | (United Kingdom) Russell Spence | PMC Warmastyle Racing | Reynard-Volkswagen 853 |
| 24/03/1985 | Rd.3 | (United Kingdom) Silverstone | (United Kingdom) Russell Spence | PMC Warmastyle Racing | Reynard-Volkswagen 853 |
| 08/04/1985 | Rd.4 | (United Kingdom) Thruxton | (United Kingdom) Russell Spence | PMC Warmastyle Racing | Reynard-Volkswagen 853 |
| 14/04/1985 | Rd.5 | (United Kingdom) Donington Park | (United Kingdom) Andy Wallace | Swallow Racing | Reynard-Volkswagen 853 |
| 21/04/1985 | Rd.6 | (Belgium) Zolder | (United Kingdom) Russell Spence | PMC Warmastyle Racing | Reynard-Volkswagen 853 |
| 06/05/1985 | Rd.7 | (United Kingdom) Thruxton | (United Kingdom) Gary Evans | Murray Taylor Racing | Ralt-Volkswagen RT30 |
| 27/05/1985 | Rd.8 | (United Kingdom) Thruxton | (United Kingdom) Andy Wallace | Swallow Racing | Reynard-Volkswagen 853 |
| 09/06/1985 | Rd.9 | (United Kingdom) Silverstone | (Brazil) Maurício Gugelmin | West Surrey Racing | Ralt-Volkswagen RT30 |
| 23/06/1985 | Rd.10 | (United Kingdom) Brands Hatch (Indy) | (United States) Ross Cheever | Valour Racing | Ralt-Volkswagen RT30 |
| 21/07/1985 | Rd.11 | (United Kingdom) Silverstone | (Netherlands) Gerrit van Kouwen | Pegasus Racing | Ralt-Volkswagen RT30 |
| 28/07/1985 | Rd.12 | (United Kingdom) Donington Park | (United Kingdom) Dave Scott | Mint Engineering | Ralt-Volkswagen RT30 |
| 11/08/2985 | Rd.13 | (United Kingdom) Snetterton | (Netherlands) Gerrit van Kouwen | Pegasus Racing | Ralt-Volkswagen RT30 |
| 17/08/2985 | Rd.14 | (United Kingdom) Oulton Park | (Netherlands) Gerrit van Kouwen | Pegasus Racing | Ralt-Volkswagen RT30 |
| 26/08/1985 | Rd.15 | (United Kingdom) Silvertone (National) | (United Kingdom) Dave Scott | Mint Engineering | Ralt-Volkswagen RT30 |
| 01/09/1985 | Rd.16 | (Belgium) Spa-Francorchamps | (United States) Ross Cheever | Valour Racing | Ralt-Volkswagen RT30 |
| 15/09/1985 | Rd.17 | (Netherlands) Zandvoort | (Brazil) Maurício Gugelmin | West Surrey Racing | Ralt-Volkswagen RT30 |
| 13/10/1985 | Rd.18 | (United Kingdom) Silverstone Circuit | (Brazil) Maurício Gugelmin | West Surrey Racing | Ralt-Volkswagen RT30 |

== Championship Tables ==
=== Class A ===
| Place | Driver | Entrant | Total |
|---|---|---|---|
| 1 | (Brazil) Maurício Gugelmin | West Surrey Racing | 85 |
| 2 | (United Kingdom) Andy Wallace | Swallow Racing | 76 |
| 3 | (United Kingdom) Russell Spence | PMC Warmastyle Racing | 64 |
| 4 | (United Kingdom) Dave Scott | Ruchard Dutton Racing; Mint Engineering | 52 |
| 5 | (Netherlands) Gerrit van Kouwen | Pegasus Racing | 46 |
| 6 | (United Kingdom) Tim Davies | Swallow Racing; Richard Dutton Racing | 39 |
| 7 | (United States) Ross Cheever | Valour Racing | 28 |
| 8 | (United Kingdom) Gary Evans | Murray Taylor Racing | 26 |
| 9= | (Norway) Harald Huysman | Eddie Jordan Racing | 10 |
| | (France) Cathy Muller | David Price Racing | 10 |
| 11 | (United Kingdom) Andrew Gilbert-Scott | Chuck McCarthy Racing | 7 |
| 12 | (United Kingdom) Anthony Reid | Scan Sport Racing; David Price Racing | 5 |
| 13 | (Netherlands) Cor Euser | Team Magnum | 3 |
| 14 | (New Zealand) Rob Wilson | Valour Racing; CW Racing; Tarry Racing | 2 |
| 15= | (United Kingdom) Dave Coyne | David Price Racing | 1 |
| | (United Kingdom) Keith Fine | Mike Rowe Racing; Intersport Racing | 1 |

=== Class B ===
| Place | Driver | Entrant | Total |
|---|---|---|---|
| 1 | (Jamaica) Carlton Tingling | Carlton Tingling | 71 |
| 2 | (United Kingdom) Giles Butterfield | Alan Docking Racing | 64 |
| 3 | (United Kingdom) Mark Goddard | Solar Racing | 63 |
| 4 | (United States) Ray Stover | Richard Dutton Racing | 45 |
| 5 | (United Kingdom) Mike Wright | Jupiter Racing | 37 |
| 6 | (United Kingdom) Steve Kempton | Worldwide Dryer Group | 35 |
| 7 | (United Kingdom) Richard Parsons | Solar Racing | 25 |
| 8 | (United Kingdom) Ross Hockenhull | Richard Dutton Racing | 23 |
| 9 | (United Kingdom) Godfrey Hall | Godfrey Hall | 17 |
| 10= | (Netherlands) Hendrik ten Cate | Van Amersfoort Racing | 15 |
| | (United Kingdom) Sean Walker | Richard Dutton Racing | 15 |
| 12 | (United Kingdom) Bill Coombes | Shape Machine Motor Racing | 13 |
| 13 | (United Kingdom) Paul Stott | Richard Dutton Racing | 10 |
| 14= | (United Kingdom) Kevin Jones | H.A.R.T. | 5 |
| | (United Kingdom) Terry Pudwell | Jupiter Racing | 5 |
| 16= | (United Kingdom) Ronnie Grant | Ronnie Grant | 4 |
| | (United Kingdom) ”Anton Sobriquet” | Jupiter Racing; CW Racing | 4 |
| 18= | (United Kingdom) Ian Khan | Mike Rowe Racing | 2 |
| | (Belgium) Rodolphe Koentges | Rodolphe Koentges | 2 |
| | (Republic of Ireland) James Tolerton | James Tolerton | 2 |
| 21st | (Australia) Wayne Earnshaw | Solar Racing | 1 |
