= Gerrit van Kouwen =

Dutch racing driver (1963–2024)

- Nationality: (Netherlands) Dutch
- Born: 5 July 1963 De Meern, Utrecht, Netherlands
- Died: 26 January 2024 (aged 60)

British Touring Car Championship
- Years active: 1989–1990
- Teams: JQF Engineering; Pyramid Motorsport
- Starts: 13
- Wins: 0
- Poles: 0
- Fastest laps: 0
- Best finish: 42nd in 1989

Championship titles
- 1982, 1983: Dutch Formula Ford 1600

Gerrit van Kouwen (5 July 1963 – 26 January 2024) was a Dutch racing driver.

Van Kouwen was born in 1963 at his father's car scrapyard in De Meern, the Netherlands.

In 1982 and 1983, van Kouwen was the Dutch Formula Ford 1600 champion and went on to win the Formula Ford Festival at Brands Hatch in 1984, the first Dutchman to win the event. Van Kouwen competed in the British Formula 3 championship in 1985, winning three races to finish the season fifth overall. A second season in British F3 followed in 1986 which saw van Kouwen improve to fourth overall despite taking only one victory during the season. Van Kouwen later switched to touring car racing and was active in this category until 1992.

Van Kouwen died of cancer on 26 January 2024.

== Racing record ==
=== Complete World Touring Car Championship results ===
(key) (Races in bold indicate pole position) (Races in italics indicate fastest lap)

Year	Team	Car	1	2	3	4	5	6	7	8	9	10	11	DC	Pts
1987	(West Germany) **Linder Rennsport**	BMW M3	MNZ	JAR	DIJ	NÜR	SPA ovr:7 cls:5	BNO	SIL	BAT	CLD	WEL	FJI	NC†	0

† Not eligible for points.

=== Complete British Touring Car Championship results ===
(key) Races in bold indicate pole position. Races in italics indicate fastest lap.

Year	Team	Car	Class	1	2	3	4	5	6	7	8	9	10	11	12	13	DC	Pts	Class
1989	JQF Engineering	Ford Sierra RS500	A	OUL; Ret	SIL ovr:9 cls:9	THR; Ret	DON ovr:5 cls:5	THR ovr:7 cls:7	SIL ovr:11 cls:11	SIL ovr:7 cls:7	BRH; Ret	SNE ovr:7 cls:7	BRH; Ret	BIR ovr:6 cls:6	DON	SIL	42nd	4	17th
1990	Pyramid Motorsport	BMW M3	B	OUL	DON ovr:8‡ cls:3‡	THR	SIL	OUL	SIL	BRH ovr:13‡ cls:10‡	SNE	BRH	BIR	DON	THR	SIL	NC‡	0	0‡

‡ Endurance driver – not eligible for points.
