= Russell Spence =

British racing driver (born 1960)

- Nationality: (United Kingdom) British
- Born: 3 January 1960 (age 66) Bradford, Yorkshire, UK

British Touring Car Championship
- Years active: 1999
- Teams: Arena International
- Starts: 12
- Wins: 0
- Poles: 0
- Fastest laps: 0
- Best finish: 18th in 1999

Russell James Spence (born 3 January 1960 in Bradford, Yorkshire) is a British racing driver. He now runs a construction business in London. In 2011, Spence was jailed for 13 months for his part in a fraud scam involving a chain of car washes.

== Early career ==
Spence first started in Hill climb events and moved into single seater racing in 1981 when he entered Formula Three. After a single Formula Three race, in the 1981 British Grand Prix support race, finishing 27th, Spence dropped back to the junior ranks for the next season. In 1982, he was champion in the Donington Park Formula Ford 1600. His good form continued in 1983, winning the EFDA Townsend Thorsen European Formula Ford 2000 Championship. During 1983, he returned to Formula Three with Eddie Jordan Racing for a one-off outing in the European Championship.

== Formula Three ==
In 1984, Spence signed for Mint Engineering – Warmastyle Racing, for his first full season off British Formula Three, in their Ralt-Volkswagen RT3/84. By only the fourth round, his experience of racing in Europe paid dividends, by winning the Grote Prijs van Zolder, at Zolder. In a season dominated by Johnny Dumfries, Spence scored two more wins, with back-to-back races at Donington Park and Oulton Park. Although he was Dumfries closest rival for the title, Spence was pipped third place by Allen Berg.

Spence stayed in British Formula Three, in 1985 for another crack at the title with PMC Motorsport, abroad a Reynard-Volkswagen 853. He had a brilliant start to the season, winning four of the first six races, two at Thruxton, one at Silverstone as well as retaining the Grote Prijs van Zolder. By the mid-season break he led the standing by five points from Andy Wallace. However, the Reynard's early season advantage had vanished, as the Ralt RT30 came on strong, winning all the remaining rounds. During this period, his team, PMC Motorsport folded, leaving him to quickly build another team, now using a Ralt RT30. Despite this, he was only two points adrift of the championship lead going into the final two rounds. With a DNF in at Zandvoort, and an 11th place at Silverstone, this saw Spence drop to third in the end-of-year standings.

== Formula 3000 ==
Spence got a drive in the second year of the International Formula 3000 Series in 1986. This was very much thought of as the proving ground for drivers who wished to get a drive in Formula One, after replacing Formula Two. Driving for Eddie Jordan Racing part way of the season before switching to Onyx Racing, his first season was an unsuccessful one, with a best place finish of sixth at the Birmingham Superprix. In 1987, he drove for Murray Taylor Racing. After a poor start, he had a strong finish to the year, with two podiums in the final two races. A second place at Le Mans followed by a third-place finish at Jarama, saw him finish the season in tenth place.

1988 was a terrible season for Spence. He drove for three different teams through the year, Team Ralt, Madgwick Motorsport and Onyx Racing, in three different cars. Despite entering all the rounds he only finished one race, with an eleventh place at Le Mans, he finished the season with no points. At the end of 1988, he retired from racing.

=== Birmingham Superprix Protest ===
Spence is most famous in the Formula 3000 championship for an incident that took place during the 1988 Birmingham Superprix. During the first lap, German driver Volker Weidler spun his car, blocking the circuit and causing a traffic jam of other cars behind him. With the front of the field driving away, Spence was furious that the race was not being red flagged. When the marshalls tried to push his car round, he kept his foot on the brake pedal in protest. With the car unable to be pushed and Spence not getting out, a track side crane was used to hoist his car off the track. The crane lifted the car up in the air with him still inside, waving his arms around for the marshalls to put him back down.

== Stateside ==
Spence made his racing comeback in 1992, in the SCCA Toyota Atlantic Championship. Abroad a Reynard-Toyota 92H, sponsored by Virgin Airways, Spence won his first two races in the United States; at Miami and Phoenix. Adding a further victory at Watkins Glen in the sixth round, helped Spence to finish fourth in the final standing, earning him a total of US$43,625. As this series supported CART, this should have assisted Spence upwards, however 1993 brought just two drives in Toyota Atlantics, not starting one nor finishing the other. 1984 was no better. In two outings for Euromotorsport, Spence at least finished; 4th place in the Monterey Sports Car Grand Prix, at Laguna Seca and 14th in an IMSA Supercar race in Phoenix.

== BTCC ==
After five-year break, Spence returned to racing as an independent in the 1999 British Touring Car Championship in an ex-works Renault Laguna for Arena International. His time in the BTCC did not go well. The first part of the season was full of incidents, ending at the fifth meeting of the season at Oulton Park when he crashed the car over the catch fence at Lodge corner. After the Croft rounds, he was replaced in the team by 1991 champion Will Hoy. He ended the season eighteenth with three points.

== Racing record ==
=== Career highlights ===
Season	Series	Position	Car	Team
1981	Marlboro British Formula 3 Championship	NC	Magnum-Toyota 813	Mike O'Brien
1982	Pace British Formula Ford 2000 Championship	NC	Van Diemen-Ford RF82	
	**Donington Park Formula Ford 1600 Championship**	**1st**	**Van Diemen-Ford RF82**	
1983	**EFDA Townsend Thorsen Formula Ford 2000 Championship**	**1st**	**Reynard-Ford 83SF**	
	European Formula 3 Championship	NC	Ralt-Toyota RT3	Eddie Jordan Racing
1984	Marlboro British Formula 3 Championship	3rd	Ralt-Volkswagen RT3	Mint Engineering – Warmastyle Racing
	European Formula 3 Championship	12th	Ralt-Volkswagen RT3	Mint Engineering – Warmastyle Racing
1985	Marlboro British Formula 3 Championship	3rd	Reynard-Volkswagen 853; Ralt-Volkswagen RT30	PMC Warmastyle Racing; Team Warmastyle Ltd.
1986	FIA International Formula 3000 Championship	24th	March-Cosworth 86B	Eddie Jordan Racing; Onyx Race Engineering
1987	FIA Intercontinental Formula 3000 Championship	10th	March-Cosworth 87B	Murray Taylor Racing
	Lucas British Formula 3 Championship	NC	Reynard-Volkswagen 873	Swallow Racing
1988	FIA International Formula 3000 Championship	NC	Ralt-Judd RT22; Reynard-Cosworth 88D; March-Cosworth 88B	Ralt Racing; Madgwick Motorsport; Onyx Race Engineering
1992	SCCA Toyota Atlantic Championship	4th	Reynard-Toyota 92H	Steadi Systems/Virgin Airways
1993	Player's Toyota Atlantic Championship	50th	Reynard-Toyota 93H	
1994	Exxon World Sports Cars Championship	40th	Ferrari 333 SP	Euromotorsport
	Bridgestone Supercar Championship	NC	Ferrari 348	Euromotorsport
1999	Auto Trader British Touring Car Championship	18th	Renault Laguna	Arena International

=== International Race Victories ===
Date	Event	Circuit	Entrant	Car – Engine
**1984**
15/04/84	British Formula 3 Championship Rd.4	Zolder	Mint Engineering – Warmastyle Racing	Ralt-Volkswagen RT30
08/07/84	British Formula 3 Championship Rd.10	Donington Park	Mint Engineering / Warmastyle Racing	Ralt-Volkswagen RT30
18/08/84	British Formula 3 Championship Rd.11	Oulton Park	Mint Engineering / Warmastyle Racing	Ralt-Volkswagen RT30
**1985**
10/03/85	British Formula 3 Championship Rd.2	Thruxton	PMC Warmastyle Racing	Reynard-Volkswagen 853
24/03/85	British Formula 3 Championship Rd.3	Silverstone	PMC Warmastyle Racing	Reynard-Volkswagen 853
08/04/85	British Formula 3 Championship Rd.4	Thruxton	PMC Warmastyle Racing	Reynard-Volkswagen 853
21/04/85	British Formula 3 Championship Rd.6	Zolder	PMC Warmastyle Racing	Reynard-Volkswagen 853
**1992**
22/03/92	Toyota Atlantic Championship Rd.1	Miami		Reynard-Toyota Motorsport GmbH 92H
04/04/92	Toyota Atlantic Championship Rd.2	Phoenix		Reynard-Toyota Motorsport GmbH 92H
27/06/92	Toyota Atlantic Championship Rd.6	Watkins Glen		Reynard-Toyota Motorsport GmbH 92H

=== Complete International Formula 3000 results ===
(key) (Races in bold indicate pole position; races in italics indicate fastest lap.)

Year	Entrant	Chassis	Engine	1	2	3	4	5	6	7	8	9	10	11	Pos.	Pts
1986	Eddie Jordan Racing	March 86B	Cosworth	SIL; 18†	VAL; DNQ	PAU; Ret	SPA; 15	IMO; Ret	MUG; DNQ	PER; Ret					23rd	0.5
1986	Onyx Race Engineering	March 86B	Cosworth								ÖST; 11	BIR; 6	BUG; 10	JAR; Ret	23rd	0.5
1987	Murray Taylor Racing	March 87B	Cosworth	SIL; Ret	VAL; Ret	SPA; 9	PAU; Ret	DON; DNQ	PER; Ret						10th	10
1987	Mountleigh Motorsport	March 87B	Cosworth							BRH; 7	BIR; 8	IMO; DNQ	BUG; 2	JAR; 3	10th	10
1988	Team Ralt	Ralt RT22	Judd	JER; Ret	VAL; Ret										NC	0
1988	Madgwick International	Reynard 88D	Cosworth			PAU; Ret	SIL; Ret	MNZ; DNQ	PER; DNS	BRH; Ret	BIR; Ret				NC	0
1988	Onyx Racing	March 88B	Cosworth									BUG; 11	ZOL; DNQ	DIJ; Ret	NC	0

=== Complete British Touring Car Championship results ===
(key) (Races in bold indicate pole position - 1 point awarded all races) (Races in italics indicate fastest lap) (* signifies that driver lead feature race for at least one lap - 1 point awarded)

Year	Team	Car	1	2	3	4	5	6	7	8	9	10	11	12	13	14	15	16	17	18	19	20	21	22	23	24	25	26	Pos.	Pts
1999	Arena International	Renault Laguna	DON; 1; 15	DON; 2; 8	SIL; 1 Ret	SIL; 2 Ret	THR; 1; 13	THR; 2; 14	BRH; 1; 11	BRH; 2 Ret	OUL; 1 DNS	OUL; 2 DNS	DON; 1; 14	DON; 2 Ret	CRO; 1; 15	CRO; 2; 11	SNE; 1	SNE; 2	THR; 1	THR; 2	KNO; 1	KNO; 2	BRH; 1	BRH; 2	OUL; 1	OUL; 2	SIL; 1	SIL; 2	18th	3

Sporting positions
Preceded by (Brazil) Ayrton Senna	EFDA Townsend Thorsen FF2000 championship 1983	Succeeded by (Brazil) Maurício Gugelmin
