= West Surrey Racing =

British motor racing team

(United Kingdom) West Surrey Racing
- Founded: 1981
- Founder(s): Dick Bennetts and Mike Cox
- Base: Sunbury-on-Thames, Surrey, England
- Team principal(s): Dick Bennetts
- Current series: BTCC; British GT
- Former series: WTCC; British F3; International Formula 3000; A1 Grand Prix
- Current drivers: British Touring Car Championship; 2. (Philippines) Daryl De Leon; 29. (United Kingdom) Lewis Gilbert; 99. (United Kingdom) Charles Rainford; British GT Championship; 61. (United Kingdom) Colin Turkington (United Kingdom) Ernie Graham
- Noted drivers: (United Kingdom) Colin Turkington (United Kingdom) Andrew Jordan (United Kingdom) Bobby Thompson (Finland) Mika Hakkinen (United Kingdom) Jake Hill (United Kingdom) Charles Rainford (United Kingdom) Rob Collard (Brazil) Ayrton Senna (United Kingdom) Adam Morgan (Brazil) Mauricio Gugelmin (United Kingdom) Allan McNish (United Kingdom) Nigel Mansell (United Kingdom) Tom Oliphant (United Kingdom) Eddie Irvine (Brazil) Rubens Barrichello (United Kingdom) Jonathan Palmer (Philippines) Daryl De Leon (United Kingdom) Charles Rainford
- Teams' Championships: BTCC – Independents: 2007, 2008, 2009, 2014; BTCC: 2014, 2016, 2017, 2018
- Drivers' Championships: British Formula 3: 1981: Jonathan Palmer; 1983: Ayrton Senna; 1985: Maurício Gugelmin; 1990: Mika Häkkinen; 1991: Rubens Barrichello; BTCC – Independents: 2004: Anthony Reid; 2007, 2008, 2009, 2014: Colin Turkington; BTCC: 2009, 2014, 2018, 2019: Colin Turkington : 2024 Jake Hill
- Website: http://www.wsr-racing.com/

West Surrey Racing is a UK-based motorsport team run by New Zealander Dick Bennetts. He is responsible for masterminding the careers of talents such as Ayrton Senna via his involvement in F3 and a racing academy in the 80s and 90s. Founded in 1981, WSR has won more than 70 races in Formula 3 and more than 100 class and outright wins in the BTCC.

== British Touring Car Championship ==
=== Ford ===
WSR moved to the BTCC in 1996 having been chosen to run the works Ford team, with Andy Rouse having left running the team to attempt to establish his own Nissan team. WSR worked in cooperation with Reynard Motorsport, who built the chassis while WSR ran the race team itself. The 1996 season was one of limited success, with Ford stalwart Paul Radisich partnered by Steve Robertson. The Mondeo had never really lived up to its hype since its inception in 1993, and Radisich ended the season 13th with 27 points, and Robertson 20th, with a paltry 2 points, even finishing lower than Independents Gary Ayles, Owen McAuley, Lee Brookes and Richard Kaye. The peak of this disappointment was possibly achieved at Round 1, when Radisich, who was running well down the order, crashed into teammate Robertson at turn 1, after Robertson had spun the car.

WSR Ford finished seventh in the Team's Championship, just ahead of the factory Peugeots of Tim Harvey and Patrick Watts.

For 1997, Radisich was partnered by departing Renault no. 2 Will Hoy, the 1991 British Touring Car Champion. Initially, an improved facelifted Mondeo was far from competitive. However, as the year continued, Hoy and Radisich were consistently fighting for points, and Radisich ended with 41 points to finish 13th, and Hoy 15th with 27 points in a mildly competitive season.

The team finished seventh in the Manufacturers' Championship, with 113 points.

Still working with Reynard, the 1998 season was much more promising. Paul Radisich left the team at the end of 1997, to join MSD Peugeot. The man who filled the vacant seat was fellow New Zealander Craig Baird, but after poor performances, Baird was occasionally replaced by Nigel Mansell, who at round 12 at a rain soaked Donington, provided one of the best races the Championship had ever witnessed. Having crashed off in race 1, and languishing at the back in race 2, Mansell gained his focus and charged through the field, and thanks to a safety car, was briefly leading. Eventually, Mansell finished fourth having allowed Derek Warwick through at the final corner, but was subsequently demoted to fifth, having passed under waved yellows. For Will Hoy, 1998 was a much improved year. In the still unfancied Mondeo, Hoy managed to finish in the top 10 of the Championship with 69 points, which included a brilliant race win at round 4, which was to be his last before his semi-retirement at the end of the season, and shock death in 2002. This was WSR's first win in Touring Cars, but it was not to be their last.

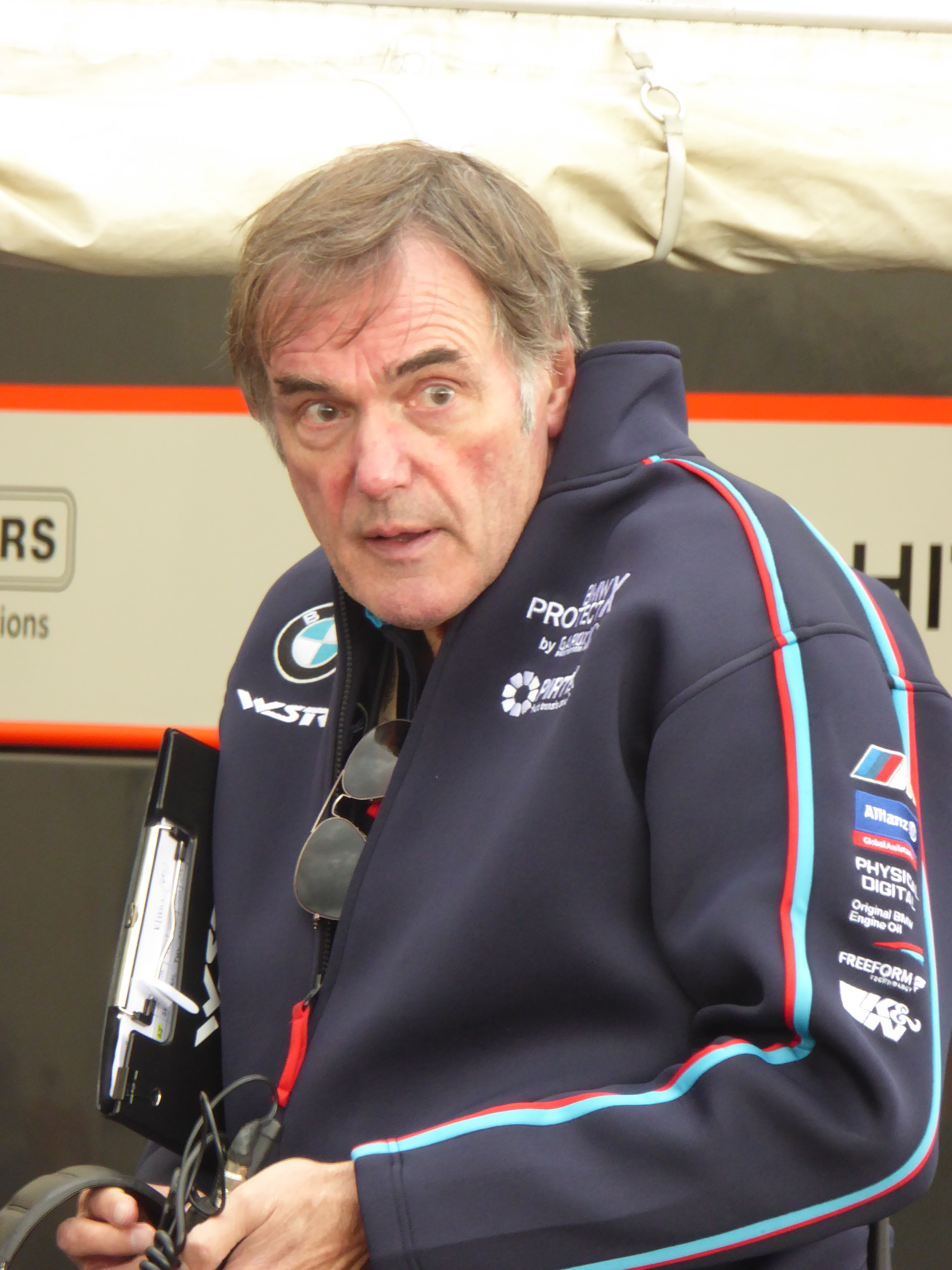
Team Principal Dick Bennetts.

Mansell and Baird finished 18th (7 points) and 20th (6 points) respectively, with WSR rounding off their 3-year stint running the Ford team with their best ever season.

=== Honda ===
1999 and 2000 saw WSR running works Honda Accords, taking over from Prodrive, who in turn ran the Ford Team that West Surrey Racing had just run.

The 1999 season saw no changes to the driver line up, with James Thompson and Peter Kox keeping their drives. Thompson made an excellent start to the season, winning the opening race of the season from pole position. This was Kox's second full season in the championship, having made his debut in select races for BMW in 1996, and struggling the previous year. Nonetheless, both drivers had successes during the year; Thompson claiming three further victories at Donington, Croft and Oulton Park, with Kox winning his only victory in the BTCC at Round 16 in the first night race at Snetterton.

Thompson ended fourth in the Driver's Championship with 174 Points and three victories, and Kox finished seventh with 113 Points and one victory. West Surrey Racing finished second in the Manufacturers' Championship [as Honda] with 296 points: Pipping Volvo by one point, but a long way off Nissan which cruised away with 464 points.

In the Year 2000, the last to be run under the Supertouring regulations, many of the previous year's teams dropped out leaving Ford, Honda and Vauxhall as the sole works entries. In order to beef up the grid, each team ran three cars. WSR partnered with JAS Motorsport to run the factory Honda team. James Thompson stayed on for his fourth year driving for Honda, whilst Peter Kox was replaced with contracted JAS drivers Tom Kristensen and Gabriele Tarquini, the 1994 Champion who partnered Thompson at Honda in 1997, and made four guest appearances in 1999. The season was a bit of a lost cause for WSR, with Ford romping away with superstars Alain Menu, Rickard Rydell and Anthony Reid, with Vauxhall the only (if distant) challenger. Tarquini was the strongest Honda driver, claiming victories at round 8 at Knockhill and round 18 at Donington Park and finishing more consistently. Thompson was replaced for rounds 3–4 and 5–6 by Peter Kox and David Leslie respectively, after a shunt at the second race kept him out of action for a few weeks, but this did not stop him from winning round 11 at Silverstone. Kristensen claimed three victories over the course of the season – the feature race at Oulton Park and the final two races of the Supertouring era under the floodlights at Silverstone.

Tarquini finished sixth in the championship on 149 points, Kristensen seventh on 143 points with Thompson equal eighth on 129 points (shared with Matt Neal).

West Surrey Racing ended the Supertouring era second in the Manufacturers' Championship, ahead of Vauxhall with 411 points.

=== MG ===
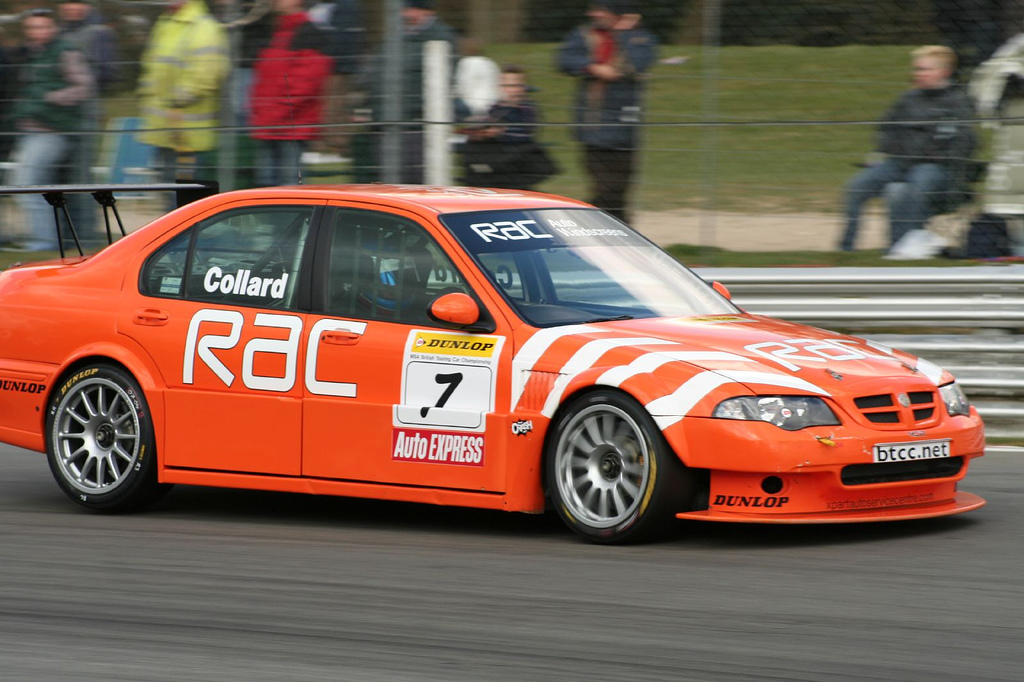
Rob Collard in a Team RAC MG

After a brief hiatus WSR returned to the BTCC late in the 2001 season running the works MG team. 2000 runner-up Anthony Reid and Warren Hughes were signed to drive for the British marque, and despite only contesting six races Reid took a victory in the penultimate race of the year (the only non-Vauxhall win of 2001). The 2002 season saw the team continue with Reid and Hughes in addition to running Colin Turkington and Gareth Howell in a 'satellite' independent MG squad backed by the pop group Atomic Kitten. MG finished second in the manufacturers' and teams' championships, and Reid was the top driver, coming fourth overall. In 2003 "Team Atomic Kitten" was dropped, and the MG works team expanded to three cars to accommodate Turkington, although MG slipped to third at the end of the season behind Vauxhall and Honda. The 2004 BTCC season saw the team lose official MG backing but they continued running Reid and Turkington to some success: the drivers finished fourth and sixth respectively overall, Reid took the Independent's title and WSR claimed third in the team's championship. A single car was entered for Rob Collard in 2005, in which he took his first win at Knockhill.

In 2006 WSR ran two MG ZSes in the British Touring Car Championship (BTCC) having secured title sponsorship from the RAC. Collard remained with the team, and Colin Turkington rejoined after a year driving for Vauxhall. The team switched to bio-ethanol fuel for the final nine races of the 2006 season.

=== BMW ===
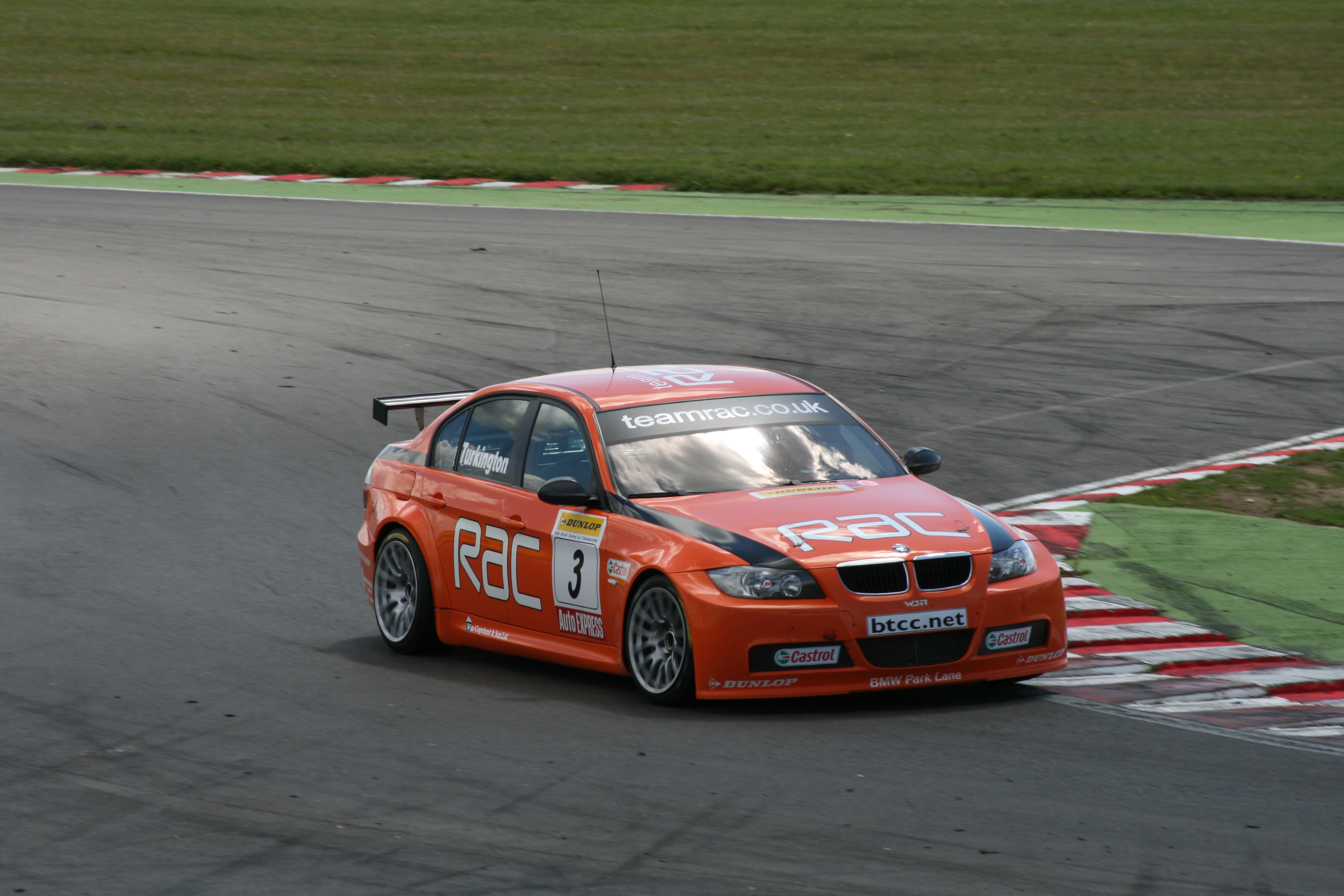
Colin Turkington driving the WSR-run BMW at Snetterton.

In 2007 the team ran BMW E90 320si cars with Colin Turkington and 2006 Clio Cup champion Tom Onslow-Cole employed as drivers, using the name Team RAC following a continued sponsorship deal with The RAC.

Onslow-Cole left the team at the end of the 2007 season to join rivals VX Racing.

A possible replacement for Onslow-Cole was Duncan Huisman who raced for WSR alongside Turkington in the 2007 World Touring Car Championship event in Macau as part of Team Aviva. However, in March 2008, Stephen Jelley was announced as Turkington's partner at WSR for the 2008 BTCC Jelley and Turkington continued with the team for 2009. A third car was entered at the final few rounds of the season, driven by the returning Anthony Reid. In the final race of the season, Turkington clinched the Drivers' Championship, the first BTCC Driver's title for the team.

RAC reduced its backing of the team for 2010, and the team failed to find a replacement title sponsor. This meant that Turkington did not have the necessary funding to continue driving for the team and retain his title. Instead, they re-signed Rob Collard from Motorbase Performance and Andy Neate, a director of team sponsors Ceravision, to replace Jelley. However, Turkington signed a deal to compete in the World Touring Car Championship (WTCC) from Portimão onwards driving a 320si with sponsorship from eBay Motors. Collard was joined by former Mini Challenge racer Nick Foster for the 2011 season, but neither driver won a race. Collard finished eighth in the Drivers' Championship, taking six podiums during the season, and Foster finished fourteenth with his best result being second at Croft.

For the 2012 season, eBay Motors rejoined the team as title sponsors. The cars were fitted with NGTC spec turbocharged engines and were by driven by Collard and Foster who were also joined by Tom Onslow-Cole, who had driven for the team in 2007. The team enjoyed a competitive season, eventually finishing as runners-up in the Teams' Championship. Collard won the opening race at Brands Hatch, followed by two more wins at Knockhill later in the year, taking him to fifth place in the final drivers' standings.

For 2013, WSR once again retained Collard and Foster in their line-up. The 2009 champion Colin Turkington managed to secure a comeback for the team, replacing Onslow-Cole. The team also replaced the BMW 320i with the BMW 125i M Sport. Turkington fought until the final meeting at Brands Hatch before ultimately finishing in fifth place.

For 2014, WSR retained Turkington, Collard and Foster for the second year in a row. Turkington won the championship with eight wins in thirty races, Collard ended sixth and Foster sixteenth.

Andy Priaulx and Sam Tordoff joined WSR for the 2015 BTCC season. The team secured their first ever 1–2–3 finish at Croft Circuit in Round 13.

Jack Goff joined WSR for the 2016 BTCC season, along with teammates Rob Collard and Sam Tordoff. Goff drove under the Team IHG Rewards Club banner while Collard and Tordoff raced as Team JCT600 with GardX. A successful season brought the Teams' Championship for Team JCT600 with GardX and the Manufacturers'/Constructors' title for WSR while Tordoff was second in the Drivers' points table.

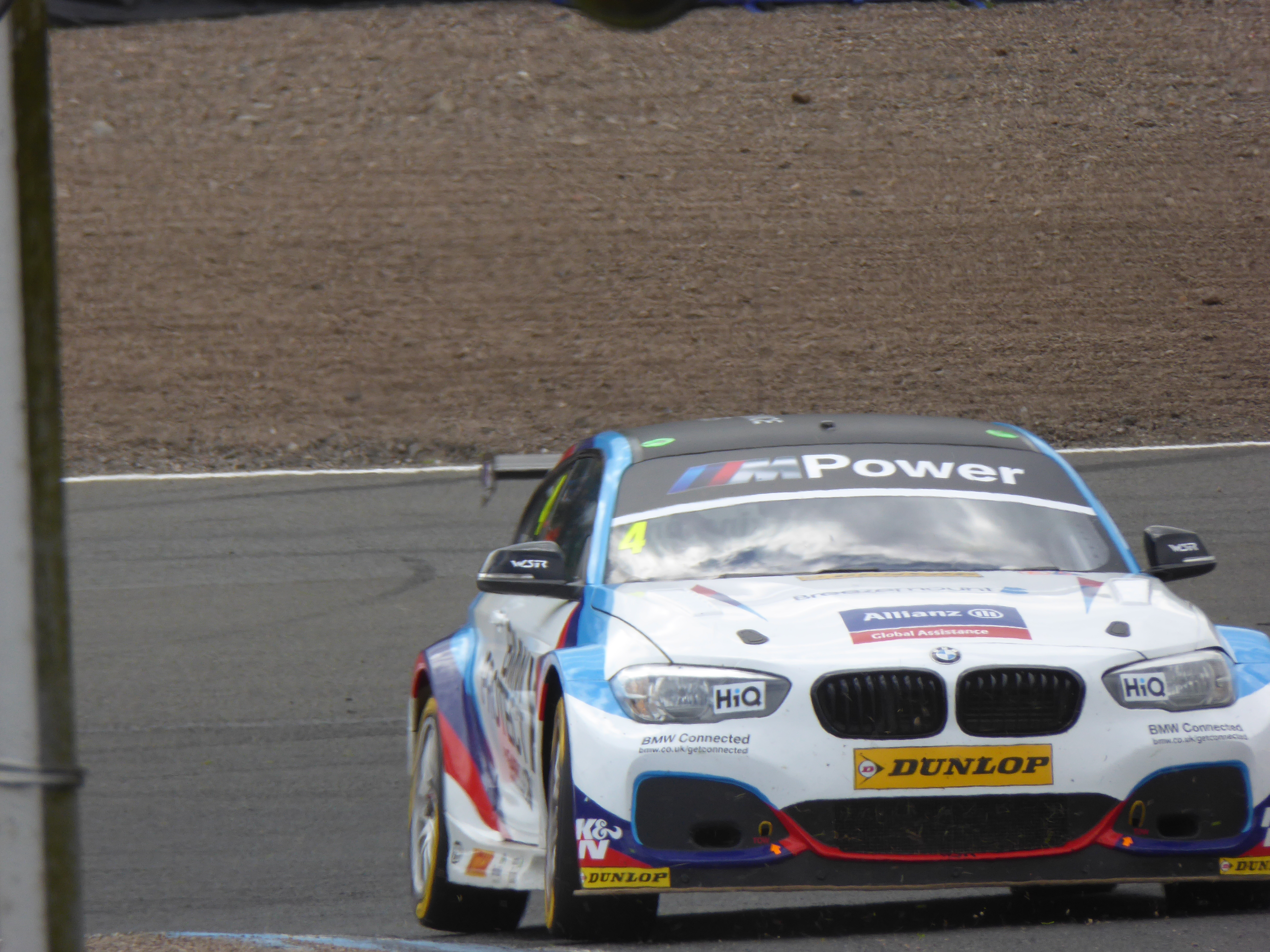
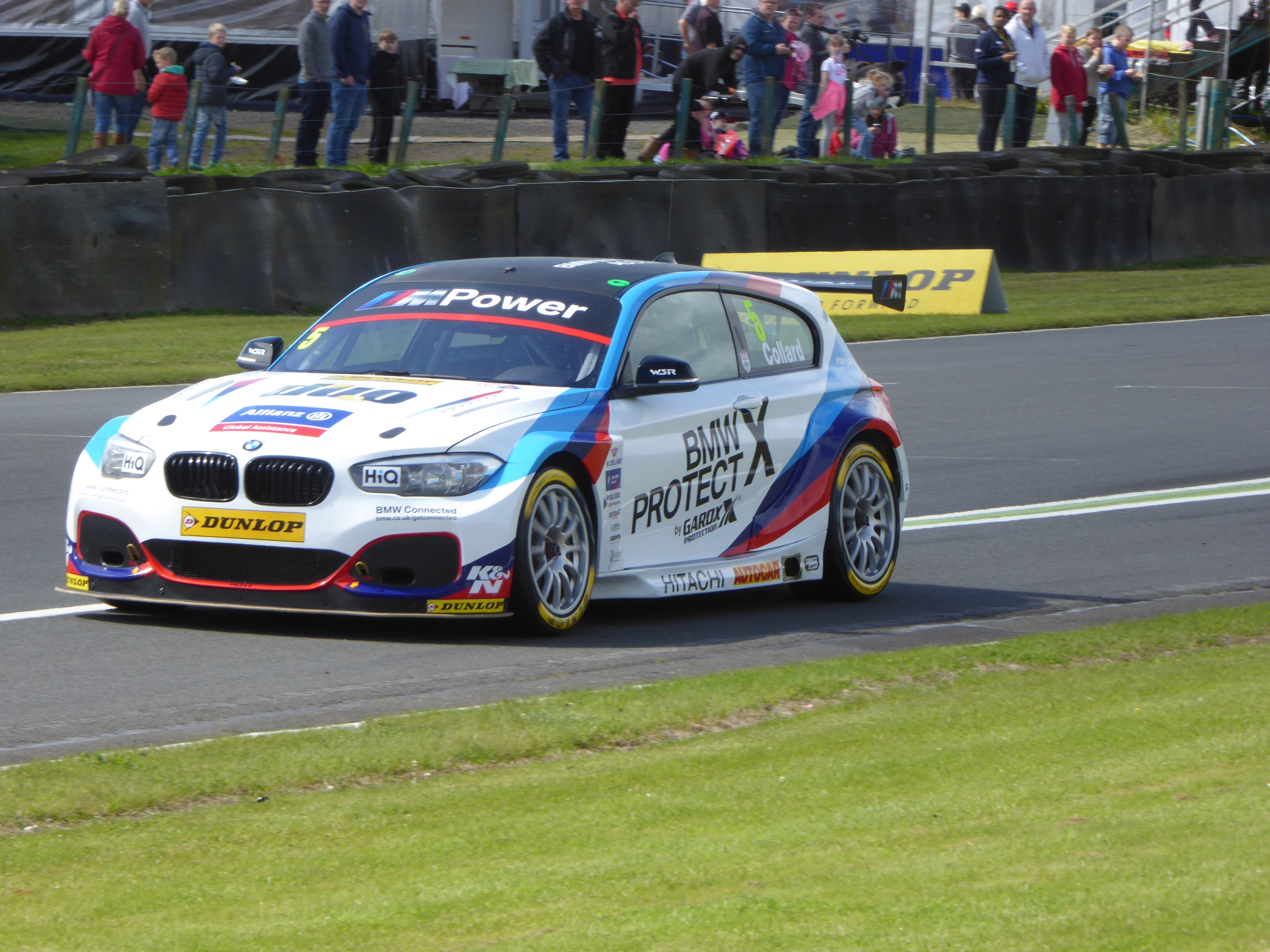
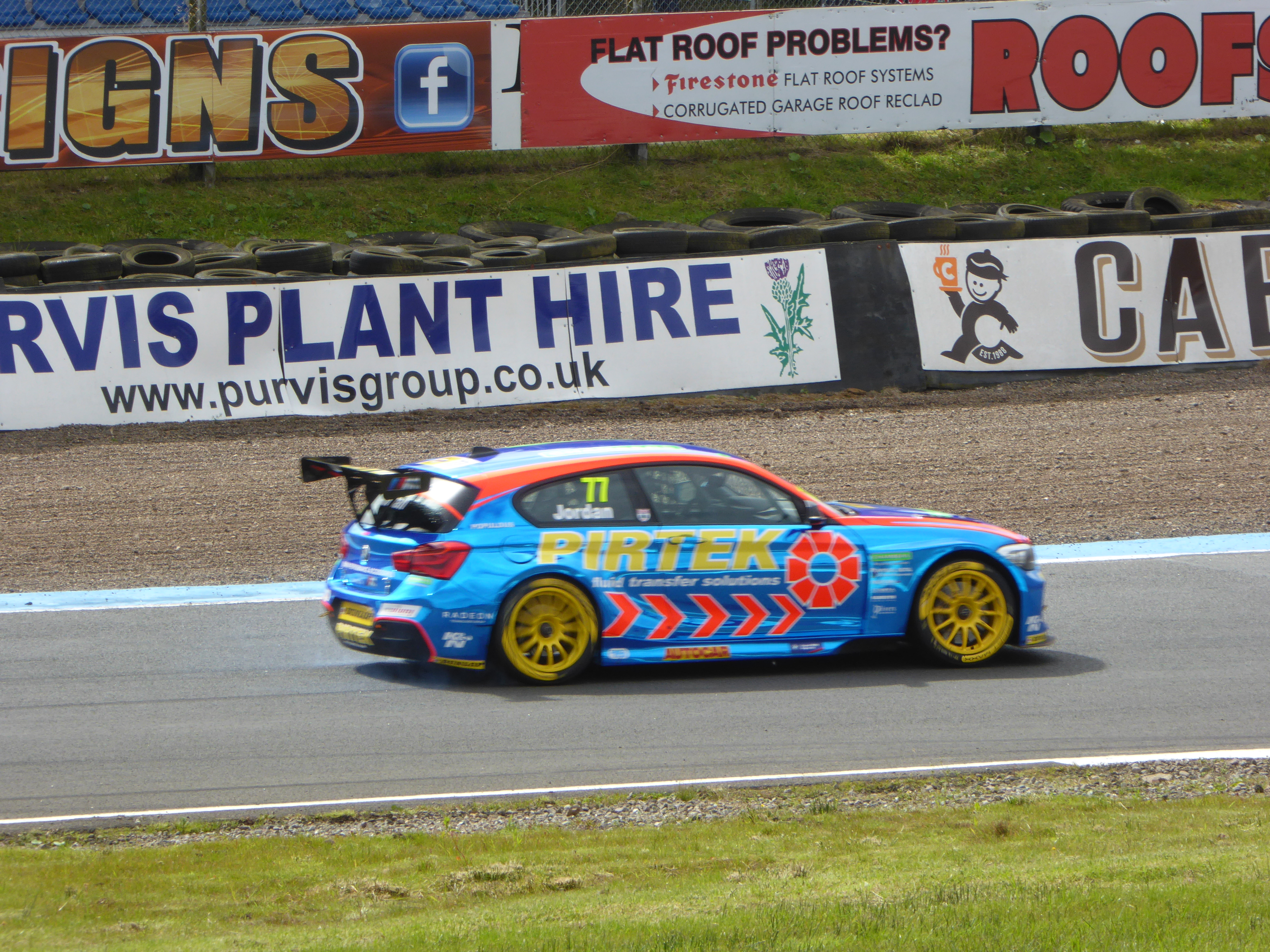
Colin Turkington (left), Rob Collard (middle) and Andrew Jordan (right), the team's drivers, at the Knockhill round of the 2017 British Touring Car Championship.

For 2017, WSR became the manufacturer entrant on behalf of BMW. Colin Turkington and Andrew Jordan joined the team to partner Rob Collard. Turkington and Collard combined to help BMW become Manufacturers' Champion and to make Team BMW the Teams' title winner. Turkington was second in the Drivers' Championship and Collard - who had to miss the final five races following a high-speed accident at Silverstone not of his own making - finished fifth. Three wins for Jordan brought him to eighth in the Drivers' table for BMW Pirtek Racing.

For the 2018 Championship the team retained the trio of Turkington, Collard and Jordan for a second year. Turkington would go on to win round 11 at Oulton Park on the way to his third BTCC Drivers Championship win with Jordan and Collard also picking up a win each on their way to 5th and 19th in the championship respectively. Rob Collard was replaced by his son, Ricky Collard, after round 18 at Snetterton Circuit. Ricky Collard would go on to finish in 25th place in the drivers standings and 13th in the Jack Sears trophy standings. The team would win both the constructors and the teams championships for the second season in a row.

For 2019 the team switched to fielding 3 BMW 330i M sports while retaining Turkington and Jordan and adding Tom Oliphant to replace Collard. Turkington would win 5 times on his way to his 2nd Drivers Championship in a row and 4th of his career, while Andrew Jordan would win 6 times on his way to 2nd in the drivers standings, 2 points of Turkington's total of 320. Oliphant would finish 11th in the standings at the end of the year achieving a career high of 3rd in race 1 at Donington Park. The Team finished 1st in the Constructors Championship and Team BMW finished 2nd in the teams championship with BMW Pirtek Racing finishing 6th.

Another championship double followed in 2020 with Teams' and Manufacturers' titles claimed by Turkington and Oliphant in a COVID-affected season. Two more Manufacturers' titles arrived over the next two seasons - the 2022 crown a record-breaking eighth in a row for BMW. The BMW 330i M Sport also became the 330e M Sport during this phase as hybrid power units were adopted by the series.

== A1 Grand Prix ==
WSR were selected by A1 Team New Zealand to run their car for the inaugural 2005–06 A1 Grand Prix season, taking the "Black Beauty" machine to 4th overall. Despite New Zealand contracting SuperNova to run their car for the 2006-07 A1 Grand Prix season WSR remained in A1GP running A1 Team USA and the new Singapore team.

A1 Grand Prix Results
Year	Car	Team	Wins	Poles	Fast laps	Points	T.C.
2005–06	Lola A1GP-Zytek	A1 Team New Zealand	0	0	0	77	4th
2006–07	Lola A1GP-Zytek	(United States) A1 Team USA	0	0	0	42	9th
2006–07	Lola A1GP-Zytek	A1 Team Singapore	0	0	0	3	20th
2007–08	Lola A1GP-Zytek	(United States) A1 Team USA	1	0	0	56	12th

- T.C. = Teams' Championship position.

== Formula 3000 ==
West Surrey Racing competed in International Formula 3000 in 1986, running a single car for Maurício Gugelmin. Although performances improved throughout the year, results were unspectacular and the team returned to Formula 3 for 1987.
