= 1985 Pau Grand Prix =

Race details
- Date: 27 May 1985
- Official name: XLV Pau Grand Prix
- Location: Pau, France
- Course: Temporary Street Circuit
- Course length: 2.760 km (1.720 miles)
- Distance: 72 laps, 198.72 km (123.84 miles)

Pole position
Driver	(Italy) Emanuele Pirro	March 85B-Cosworth
- Time: 1:12.650

Fastest lap
Driver	(Germany) Christian Danner	March 85B-Cosworth
- Time: 1:13.26

Podium
First	(Germany) Christian Danner	March 85B-Cosworth
Second	(Italy) Emanuele Pirro	March 85B-Cosworth
Third	(Italy) Lamberto Leoni	Williams FW08-Cosworth

The 1985 Pau Grand Prix was a Formula 3000 motor race held on 27 May 1985 at the Pau circuit, in Pau, Pyrénées-Atlantiques, France.

== Classification ==
=== Qualifying ===
Emanuele Pirro took pole position with a time of 1:12.650.

Pos	No	Driver	Team	Time	Grid
1	9	(Italy) Emanuele Pirro	Onyx Race Engineering	1:12.650	1
2	1	(New Zealand) Mike Thackwell	Ralt Racing Ltd	1:12.710	2
3	3	(France) Michel Ferté	Equipe Oreca	1:12.830	3
4	22	(France) Alain Ferté	Corbari Italia	1:13.210	4
5	2	(Denmark) John Nielsen	Ralt Racing Ltd	1:13.210	5
6	5	(France) Philippe Streiff	Automobiles Gonfaronnaises Sportives	1:13.470	5
7	4	(France) Olivier Grouillard	Equipe Oreca	1:14.250	7
8	34	(Italy) Ivan Capelli	Genoa Racing	1:14.300	8
9	18	(Italy) Lamberto Leoni	PMC Motorsport	1:14.300	9
10	8	(Germany) Christian Danner	BS Automotive	1:14.420	10
11	10	(Switzerland) Mario Hytten	Onyx Race Engineering	1:14.540	11
12	21	(Argentina) Juan Manuel Fangio II	Corbari Italia	1:15.330	12
13	13	(Italy) Gabriele Tarquini	Sanremo Racing	1:15.850	13
14	7	(France) Jean-Philippe Grand	BS Automotive	1:16.300	14
15	33	(Italy) Guido Daccò	Sanremo Racing	1:16.460	15

=== Race ===
Christian Danner won the Grand Prix, with Emanuele Pirro in second and Lamberto Leoni in third.

Pos	No	Driver	Team	Vehicle	Laps	Time/Retired	Grid	Pts
1	8	(Germany) Christian Danner	BS Automotive	March 85B-Cosworth	72	1hr 30min 28.630sec	10	9
2	9	(Italy) Emanuele Pirro	Onyx Race Engineering	March 85B-Cosworth	72	+ 41.750 s	1	6
3	18	(Italy) Lamberto Leoni	PMC Motorsport	Williams FW08-Cosworth	72	+ 59.620 s	9	4
4	4	(France) Olivier Grouillard	Equipe Oreca	March 85B-Cosworth	72	+ 1:03.500 s	7	3
5	5	(France) Philippe Streiff	Automobiles Gonfaronnaises Sportives	AGS JH20-Cosworth	71	+ 1 lap	6	2
Ret	21	(Argentina) Juan Manuel Fangio II	Corbari Italia	Lola T950-Cosworth	52	Accident	12	
Ret	22	(France) Alain Ferté	Corbari Italia	March 85B-Cosworth	31	Gearbox	4	
Ret	3	(France) Michel Ferté	Equipe Oreca	March 85B-Cosworth	28	Electrical	3	
Ret	2	(Denmark) John Nielsen	Ralt Racing Ltd	Ralt RB20-Cosworth	9	Suspension	5	
Ret	10	(Switzerland) Mario Hytten	Onyx Race Engineering	March 85B-Cosworth	4	Accident	11	
Ret	1	(New Zealand) Mike Thackwell	Ralt Racing Ltd	Ralt RB20-Cosworth	2	Accident	2	
DNS	7	(France) Jean-Philippe Grand	BS Automotive	March 85B-Cosworth		Did Not Start		
DNS	34	(Italy) Ivan Capelli	Genoa Racing	March 85B-Cosworth		Did Not Start		
DNS	33	(Italy) Guido Daccò	Sanremo Racing	March 85B-Cosworth		Did Not Start		
DNS	13	(Italy) Gabriele Tarquini	Sanremo Racing	March 85B-Cosworth		Did Not Start		
Fastest Lap: Christian Danner (BS Automotive) - 1:13.26
