= 1985 European Formula 3000 Championship =

Motor racing competition

1985 FIA European Formula 3000 Championship

Seasons
- ← 1984 (F2) 1986 →

The 1985 European Formula 3000 Championship was the inaugural season of the Formula 3000 category. The European Formula 3000 Championship replaced Formula Two as the official feeder series to Formula One. It was scheduled over 12 rounds and contested over 11 rounds. 14 different teams tried their luck with 33 different drivers and 7 different chassis. The series was won by the German Christian Danner driving for BS Automotive.

Danner, who was laying second in the championship at the time, would graduate to Formula One when he made his Grand Prix debut for the German Zakspeed team at the 1985 Belgian Grand Prix at Spa-Francorchamps on 15 September, a week before he won the final round of the F3000 championship at Donington Park to clinch the title from Mike Thackwell.

Danner had the honour of being the first in a long line of Formula 3000 champions who would fail to make an impact on Formula One, despite the championship being seen as the highest level FIA single-seater championship behind Grand Prix racing. Only future champions Jean Alesi, Olivier Panis and Juan Pablo Montoya would actually go on to win a Formula One Grand Prix.

== Drivers and teams ==
Team	Chassis	Engine	No.	Drivers	Rounds
(United Kingdom) Ralt Racing Ltd	Ralt RB20	Cosworth DFV	1	(New Zealand) Mike Thackwell	All
(United Kingdom) Ralt Racing Ltd	Ralt RB20	Cosworth DFV	2	(Denmark) John Nielsen	All
(France) Équipe Oreca	March 85B	Cosworth DFV	3	(France) Michel Ferté	All
(France) Équipe Oreca	March 85B	Cosworth DFV	4	(Austria) Pierre Chauvet	1, 4, 11
(France) Équipe Oreca	March 85B	Cosworth DFV	4	(France) Olivier Grouillard	2-3, 5-10
(France) Équipe Oreca	March 85B	Cosworth DFV	4	(France) Pascal Fabre	12
(France) Équipe Oreca	March 85B	Cosworth DFV	35	(France) Alain Ferté	12
(France) Automobiles Gonfaronnaises Sportives	AGS JH20	Cosworth DFV	5	(France) Philippe Streiff	1-3, 5-8, 10-12
(United Kingdom) BS Automotive	March 85B	Cosworth DFV	7	(Sweden) Tomas Kaiser	1-5, 9-12
(United Kingdom) BS Automotive	March 85B	Cosworth DFV	7	(France) Jean-Philippe Grand	6-7
(United Kingdom) BS Automotive	March 85B	Cosworth DFV	7	(France) Philippe Alliot	8
(United Kingdom) BS Automotive	March 85B	Cosworth DFV	8	(Germany) Christian Danner	All
(United Kingdom) Onyx	March 85B	Cosworth DFV	9	(Italy) Emanuele Pirro	All
(United Kingdom) Onyx	March 85B	Cosworth DFV	10	(United Kingdom) Johnny Dumfries	1-5
(United Kingdom) Onyx	March 85B	Cosworth DFV	10	(Switzerland) Mario Hytten	6-12
(Italy) Sanremo Racing	March 85B	Cosworth DFV	13	(Italy) Gabriele Tarquini	All
(Italy) Sanremo Racing	March 85B	Cosworth DFV	14	(Italy) Alessandro Santin	1-5, 9-12
(Italy) Sanremo Racing	March 85B	Cosworth DFV	14	(Italy) Ivan Capelli	6
(Italy) Sanremo Racing	March 85B	Cosworth DFV	14	(Italy) Aldo Bertuzzi	8
(Italy) Sanremo Racing	March 85B	Cosworth DFV	33	(Italy) Roberto Del Castello	2-5
(Italy) Sanremo Racing	March 85B	Cosworth DFV	33	(Italy) Guido Daccò	6-12
(United Kingdom) Lola Motorsport	Lola T950	Cosworth DFV	15	(France) Alain Ferté	1-5
(United Kingdom) Lola Motorsport	Lola T950	Cosworth DFV	15	(United Kingdom) Johnny Dumfries	7-8
(United Kingdom) Lola Motorsport	Lola T950	Cosworth DFV	15	(France) Philippe Streiff	9
(United Kingdom) Lola Motorsport	Lola T950	Cosworth DFV	15	(United Kingdom) James Weaver	10-11
(United Kingdom) Lola Motorsport	Lola T950	Cosworth DFV	15	(United Kingdom) Valentino Musetti	12
(United Kingdom) Lola Motorsport	Lola T950	Cosworth DFV	16	(Italy) Fulvio Ballabio	12
(United Kingdom) PMC Motorsport	Williams FW08C	Cosworth DFV	17	(Belgium) Thierry Tassin	1-2
(United Kingdom) PMC Motorsport	Williams FW08C	Cosworth DFV	18	(Italy) Lamberto Leoni	1-2, 5-8
(Netherlands) Barron Racing	Tyrrell 012	Cosworth DFV	19	(Italy) Claudio Langes	1-2
(Netherlands) Barron Racing	Tyrrell 012	Cosworth DFV	20	(Brazil) Roberto Moreno	1-3, 5
(Netherlands) Barron Racing	Tyrrell 012	Cosworth DFV	20	(Spain) Adrián Campos	4
(Italy) Corbari Italia	Lola T950	Cosworth DFV	21	(Argentina) Juan Manuel Fangio II	2-7
(Italy) Corbari Italia	Lola T950	Cosworth DFV	22	(Switzerland) Mario Hytten	1-5
(Italy) Corbari Italia	March 85B	Cosworth DFV	21	(Argentina) Juan Manuel Fangio II	8-9
(Italy) Corbari Italia	March 85B	Cosworth DFV	21	(Switzerland) Max Busslinger	10-11
(Italy) Corbari Italia	March 85B	Cosworth DFV	21	(Italy) Stefano Livio	12
(Italy) Corbari Italia	March 85B	Cosworth DFV	22	(France) Alain Ferté	6-8
(Italy) Corbari Italia	March 85B	Cosworth DFV	22	(Italy) Lamberto Leoni	9-12
(Sweden) Ekström Racing	March 85B	Cosworth DFV	23	(United States) Eric Lang	2, 12
(United Kingdom) Eddie Jordan Racing	March 85B	Cosworth DFV	25	(Belgium) Thierry Tassin	3, 7-8, 10-12
(United Kingdom) Roger Cowman	Arrows A6	Cosworth DFV	26	(Sweden) Slim Borgudd	2, 5, 7, 12
(Italy) Genoa Racing	March 85B	Cosworth DFV	34	(Italy) Ivan Capelli	5, 7-12

== Season review ==
Rnd	Track	Date	Laps	Distance	Time	Speed	Pole position	Fastest lap	Race winner	Report
1	(United Kingdom) Silverstone	24 March	44	207.64 km	1'07:41.01	183.976 km/h	(France) Michel Ferté	(Denmark) John Nielsen	(New Zealand) Mike Thackwell	Report
2	(United Kingdom) Thruxton	7 April	54	204.768 km	1'05:00.83	188.912 km/h	(New Zealand) Mike Thackwell	(Germany) Christian Danner	(Italy) Emanuele Pirro	Report
3	(Portugal) Estoril	21 April	47	204.45 km	1'12:44.424	168.640 km/h	(New Zealand) Mike Thackwell	(New Zealand) Mike Thackwell	(Denmark) John Nielsen	Report
4	(West Germany) Nürburgring	28 April	—N/a				(New Zealand) Mike Thackwell	Cancelled due to snow		
5	(Italy) Vallelunga	12 May	65	208.0 km	1'15:14.83	165.53 km/h	(New Zealand) Mike Thackwell	(Italy) Emanuele Pirro	(Italy) Emanuele Pirro	Report
6	(France) Pau	27 May	72	198.72 km	1.30:28.63	131.781 km/h	(Italy) Emanuele Pirro	(Germany) Christian Danner	(Germany) Christian Danner	Report
7	(Belgium) Spa-Francorchamps	2 June	29	201.521 km	1'11:56.510	167.852 km/h	(France) Michel Ferté	(New Zealand) Mike Thackwell	(New Zealand) Mike Thackwell	Report
8	(France) Dijon	30 June	55	209.0 km	1'08:54.10	181.998 km/h	(Denmark) John Nielsen	(Belgium) Thierry Tassin	(Germany) Christian Danner	Report
9	(Italy) Pergusa-Enna	28 July	40	198.0 km	1'01:58.99	191,664 km/h	(New Zealand) Mike Thackwell	(Germany) Christian Danner	(New Zealand) Mike Thackwell	Report
10	(Austria) Österreichring	17 August	31	184.202 km	0'53:56.114	204.915 km/h	(Germany) Christian Danner	(New Zealand) Mike Thackwell	(Italy) Ivan Capelli	Report
11	(Netherlands) Zandvoort	24 August	48	204.096 km	1'15:19.023	162.589 km/h	(Germany) Christian Danner	(Germany) Christian Danner	(Germany) Christian Danner	Report
12	(United Kingdom) Donington Park	22 September	40	160.920 km	0'59:17.83	160.954 km/h	(New Zealand) Mike Thackwell	(Italy) Ivan Capelli	(Germany) Christian Danner	Report
NC	(Netherlands Antilles) Curaçao	13 October	58	205.900 km	1:41:29.572		(New Zealand) Mike Thackwell	(Denmark) John Nielsen	(Denmark) John Nielsen	Report

Round 1: Silverstone, United Kingdom

At the start, the track was wet, and Emanuele Pirro took the lead from the second row, with pole sitter Michel Ferté dropping through the field. Alessandro Santin went off and out of the race at the first corner. At Maggots, Mike Thackwell took the lead from Pirro, and began to pull out a lead. By the end of the first lap, Christian Danner was up to second from sixth on the grid, with Ferté back into third place already. Pirro had fallen back to fourth, and Roberto Moreno was in fifth. At the Woodcote Chicane, Ferté got back past Danner into second place. Gabriele Tarquini spun exiting the Woodcote Chicane, but was miraculously avoided by everyone, and continued. On the drying track, Johnny Dumfries crashed, and Ferté took the lead back from Thackwell at the Woodcote Chicane. Not long after this, the heavens opened again, and Thackwell got back past Ferté while they both lapped Pirro. Moreno spun at the Woodcote Chicane, but quickly got back going again. Ferté also spun at the chicane, and badly damaged the front end of his car. John Nielsen got past Ferté's damaged car before Thackwell took his third Silverstone International Trophy victory, 32 seconds ahead of second placed Nielsen. Ferté finished third, Danner finished a lap down in fourth, and Tarquini and Moreno finished fifth and sixth respectively, despite them both spinning.

Round 2: Thruxton, United Kingdom

Gabriele Tarquini got the best start, going from fifth to first in one corner, but while going past Mike Thackwell, he clipped the front nose of the New Zealander's car, causing it to bend. Going into Campbell, Roberto Moreno slid off the track and out of the race. Johnny Dumfries harmlessly spun off at the next corner, Cobb, and he quickly rejoined the race. Michel Ferté took the lead from Thackwell into the Club Chicane, with Tomas Kaiser passing him on the pit straight afterwards. Thackwell pitted for a new front nosecone, and soon after, his teammate, John Nielsen pitted for a new nosecone himself. Ferté, who had started on wet tires, pitted for dry tires, as the track was almost completely dry. Kaiser then held a brief lead, before being overtaken by Emanuele Pirro. Then Thackwell, who had recovered most of the time he lost in the pit stop, overtook Ferté into Church. On the last lap, the back markers of Tarquini and Eric Lang were all that separated Pirro and Thackwell, but Lang had handling issues and slowed Thackwell down. After being overtaken, Lang promptly spun. Thackwell couldn't make up the lost time, and finished second to Pirro. Ferté finished third again, and Kaiser, Tarquini and Danner made up the rest of the points scorers.

Round 3: Estoril, Portugal

For the first time, Formula 3000 supported a round of Formula One. At the start, Thackwell got a good start, and Pirro nearly spun on the grass while trying to make up positions from tenth. After pulling out a big lead, Thackwell slowed because of electrical problems, leaving his teammate Nielsen to inherit the lead. Ferté and Tarquini fought for second place, while Nielsen pulled out a large lead. Pirro took fourth place from Moreno, and Nielsen took victory, with Ferté beating out Tarquini for second, with Pirro in fourth, Moreno in fifth, and Olivier Grouillard in sixth, taking his first point of the year.

Nurburgring, Germany

Round 4 was planned to take place at the still new Nurburgring GP Track, but heavy snow halted racing, and teams, fans, and drivers had to pack up and head to the next race.

Round 4: Vallelunga, Italy

At the start, Ferté took the lead from pole sitter Thackwell, with his teammate Nielsen up into third, and local hero Pirro settling into fourth. The front four stuck together like glue for most of the race, with Ferté keeping the door firmly shut to Thackwell. Nielsen overtook his teammate for second, but seemingly couldn't do anything about the Frenchman either. A collision between Ivan Capelli and Lamberto Leoni that launched Capelli into the air and heavily damaged his car, and damaged Leoni's rear wing. Pirro overtook Thackwell for third place, before quickly overtaking Nielsen for second. Then, while overtaking a back marker, Pirro made his move on Ferté, going three wide to make the overtake. Thackwell crashed out of the race when he had to avoid his teammate when he made a mistake. Ferté suffered an electrical fault that ended his race. Pirro won at his home race, with Nielsen second, Danner third, Grouillard in fourth, Philippe Streiff in fifth, and Dumfries sixth.

Round 5: Pau, France

Ferté overtook Thackwell for second at the start, while Pirro held onto the lead. Nielsen was fourth and Alain Ferté, older brother of Michel, dropped from third to fifth. Michel Ferté spun, and he took Thackwell out with him, sidelining the New Zealander. Ferté continued further down the field. Nielsen also went out of the race, and Danner in third was chasing down second placed Alain. Pirro started to slow because of overheating while Danner took second place. Danner made quick work of the Italian, and took the lead of the race. Alain Ferté retired with gearbox issues, while Danner held on to win the race, with Pirro holding onto second. Leoni was third, Grouillard fourth, Streiff in fifth, and Juan Manuel Fangio II in sixth, albeit 21 laps down.

Round 6: Spa-Francorchamps

The track at Spa-Francorchamps had been recently shortened from the 14 kilometer, mostly flat out original layout, to the shorter 7 kilometer version. The track had also been resurfaced, and it was very slippery. The two Ferté brothers were 1-2 at the start, with Michel ahead of Alain, and Pirro was in third place. Belgian Thierry Tassin was quickly up to sixth at his home race, passing Danner along the way. Streiff and Pirro fought hard over third and fourth, both ended up pushing too hard and retired with damaged cars. Michel Ferté was next to make a mistake, damaging his car too badly to continue. Tassan was next, being forced to retire from third. Alain Ferté was the most fortunate, as he spun and clipped the barrier, but was able to continue, even if he lost the lead to Thackwell. Nielsen took second from Alain, but nearly spun after. It wasn't too long until Nielsen's engine gave up on him, and Alain inherited second again. Thackwell won by 50 seconds to Alain, with Danner taking the final podium spot. Tarquini was fourth, Guido Daccò was fifth, and Fangio II finished sixth.

== Championship standings ==
Scoring system

Points are awarded to the top 6 classified finishers.

Position	**1st**	**2nd**	**3rd**	**4th**	**5th**	**6th**
Points	9	6	4	3	2	1

=== Final point standings ===
Pos	Driver	SIL (United Kingdom)	THR (United Kingdom)	EST (Portugal)	NÜR (Germany)	VLL (Italy)	PAU (France)	SPA (Belgium)	DIJ (France)	PER (Italy)	ÖST (Austria)	ZAN (Netherlands)	DON (United Kingdom)	Pts
1	(Germany) Christian Danner	4	6	9	C	3	1	3	1	3	**16**	**1**	1	51
2	(New Zealand) Mike Thackwell	1	**2**	**NC**	**C**	**Ret**	Ret	1	2	**1**	9	2	**Ret**	45
3	(Italy) Emanuele Pirro	7	1	4	C	1	**2**	Ret	Ret	2	4	5	Ret	38
4	(Denmark) John Nielsen	2	NC	1	C	2	Ret	Ret	**3**	Ret	2	4	13	34
5	(France) Michel Ferté	**3**	3	2	C	Ret	Ret	**Ret**	8	Ret	Ret	Ret	4	17
6	(Italy) Gabriele Tarquini	5	5	3	C	Ret	DNS	4	13	4	13	Ret	Ret	14
7	(Italy) Ivan Capelli					Ret	DNS	Ret	Ret	Ret	1	DNS	3	13
8	(France) Philippe Streiff	Ret	Ret	10		5	5	Ret	9	Ret	5	3	5	12
9	(France) Alain Ferté	8	12	7	C	Ret	Ret	2	4				6	10
10	(Switzerland) Mario Hytten	9	10	Ret	C	Ret	Ret	Ret	12	5	10	Ret	2	8
11	(Italy) Lamberto Leoni	NC	16			Ret	3	Ret	15	Ret	3	11	11	8
12	(France) Olivier Grouillard		8	6		4	4	Ret	7	8	8			7
13	(Italy) Guido Daccò						DNS	5	5	6	12	6	7	6
14	(Sweden) Tomas Kaiser	10	4	DSQ	C	8				Ret	11	9	8	3
15	(Brazil) Roberto Moreno	6	Ret	5		9								3
16	(United Kingdom) Johnny Dumfries	Ret	7	Ret	C	6		Ret	10					1
17	(Belgium) Thierry Tassin	NC	13	Ret				Ret	Ret		6	8	Ret	1
18	(Argentina) Juan Manuel Fangio II		Ret	11	C	Ret	Ret	6	14	Ret				1
19	(France) Philippe Alliot								6					1
20	(Italy) Alessandro Santin	Ret	9	Ret	C	Ret				7	7	7	9	0
21	(Italy) Roberto Del Castello		14	8	C	7								0
22	(United Kingdom) James Weaver										14	10		0
23	(Sweden) Slim Borgudd		DNQ			10		Ret					Ret	0
24	(France) Pascal Fabre												10	0
25	(United States) Eric Lang		11										12	0
26	(Italy) Aldo Bertuzzi								11					0
27	(Switzerland) Max Busslinger										15	12		0
28	(Italy) Fulvio Ballabio												14	0
29	(Italy) Claudio Langes	Ret	15											0
30	(United Kingdom) Val Musetti												15	0
31	(Italy) Stefano Livio												16	0
	(Austria) Pierre Chauvet	DNS			C							Ret		
	(France) Jean-Philippe Grand						DNS	Ret						
	(Spain) Adrián Campos				C									
Pos	Driver	SIL (United Kingdom)	THR (United Kingdom)	EST (Portugal)	NÜR (Germany)	VAL (Italy)	PAU (France)	SPA (Belgium)	DIJ (France)	PER (Italy)	ÖST (Austria)	ZAN (Netherlands)	DON (United Kingdom)	Pts

Colour	Result
Gold	Winner
Silver	Second place
Bronze	Third place
Green	Points classification
Blue	Non-points classification
Blue	Non-classified finish (NC)
Purple	Retired, not classified (Ret)
Red	Did not qualify (DNQ)
Red	Did not pre-qualify (DNPQ)
Black	Disqualified (DSQ)
White	Did not start (DNS)
White	Withdrew (WD)
White	Race cancelled (C)
Blank	Did not practice (DNP)
Blank	Did not arrive (DNA)
Blank	Excluded (EX)

=== Notes ===
- Results in **bold** indicate **pole position**.
- Results in italics indicate fastest lap.
