= 1985 Mediterranean Grand Prix =

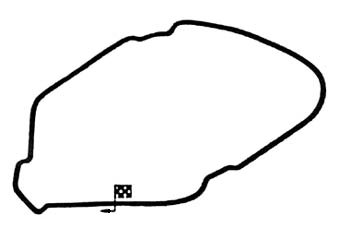

Race details
- Date: 28 July 1985
- Official name: 24th Gran Premio del Mediterraneo
- Location: Pergusa, Sicily, Italy
- Course: Autodromo di Pergusa
- Course length: 4.950 km (3.076 miles)
- Distance: 40 laps, 198.000 km (123.040 miles)

Pole position
| Driver | (New Zealand) Mike Thackwell | Ralt-Cosworth |
- Time: 1:29.52

Fastest lap
| Driver | (Germany) Christian Danner | March-Cosworth |
- Time: 1:31.29

Podium
| First | (New Zealand) Mike Thackwell | Ralt-Cosworth |
| Second | (Italy) Emanuele Pirro | March-Cosworth |
| Third | (Germany) Christian Danner | March-Cosworth |

The 24th Gran Premio del Mediterraneo (Grand Prix of the Mediterranean), was the eighth round of the 1985 International Formula 3000. This was held on the Isle of Sicily, at the Autodromo di Pergusa, Enna, on 28 July.

== Report ==
=== Entry ===
A total of just 15 F3000 cars, from 8 teams ventured across the Strait of Messina for the event.

=== Qualifying ===
Mike Thackwell took pole position for Team Ralt, in their Ralt-Cosworth RT20, averaging a speed of 123.768 mph.

=== Race ===
The race was held over 40 laps of the Enna-Pergusa circuit. Mike Thackwell took the winner spoils for works Ralt team, driving their Ralt-Cosworth RT20. The Kiwi won in a time of 1hr 01:58.99mins., averaging a speed of 119.103 mph. Just 0.63 seconds behind, was the second place car of Emanuele Pirro, driving Onyx Racing’s March 85B. The podium was completed by the BS Automotive March of Christian Danner.

== Classification ==
=== Race result ===
| Pos. | No. | Driver | Entrant | Car - Engine | Time, Laps | Reason Out |
|---|---|---|---|---|---|---|
| 1st | 1 | (New Zealand) Mike Thackwell | Team Ralt | Ralt-Cosworth RT20 | 1hr 01:58.99 | |
| 2nd | 9 | (Italy) Emanuele Pirro | Onyx Racing | March-Cosworth 85B | 1hr 01:59.62 | |
| 3rd | 8 | (Germany) Christian Danner | BS Automotive | March-Cosworth 85B | 1hr 02:20.10 | |
| 4th | 13 | (Italy) Gabriele Tarquini | Sanremo Racing Srl | March-Cosworth 85B | 1hr 02:51.85 | |
| 5th | 10 | (Switzerland) Mario Hytten | Onyx Racing | March-Cosworth 85B | 1hr 02:52.61 | |
| 6th | 33 | (Italy) Guido Daccò | Sanremo Racing Srl | March-Cosworth 85B | 1hr 02:53.32 | |
| 7th | 14 | (Italy) Alessandro Santin | Sanremo Racing Srl | March-Cosworth 85B | 40 | |
| 8th | 4 | (France) Olivier Grouillard | Oreca Motorsport | March-Cosworth 85B | 37 | |
| DNF | 22 | (Italy) Lamberto Leoni | Corbari Italia | March-Cosworth 85B | 31 | Engine |
| DNF | 34 | (Italy) Ivan Capelli | Genoa Racing | March-Cosworth 85B | 18 | Engine |
| DNF | 2 | (Denmark) John Nielsen | Team Ralt | Ralt-Cosworth RT20 | 17 | Overheating |
| DNF | 3 | (France) Michel Ferté | Oreca Motorsport | March-Cosworth 85B | 9 | Accident |
| DNF | 7 | (Sweden) Tomas Kaiser | BS Automotive | March-Cosworth 85B | 9 | Accident |
| DNF | 15 | (France) Philippe Streiff | Lola Motorsport | Lola-Cosworth T950 | 6 | Accident |
| DNF | 21 | (Argentina) Juan Manuel Fangio II | Corbari Italia | March-Cosworth 85B | 6 | Accident |

- Fastest lap: Christian Danner, 1:31.29secs. (121.446 mph)
