= 1985 Grand Prix F3000 de Belgique =

1985 Belgian F3000 Grand Prix
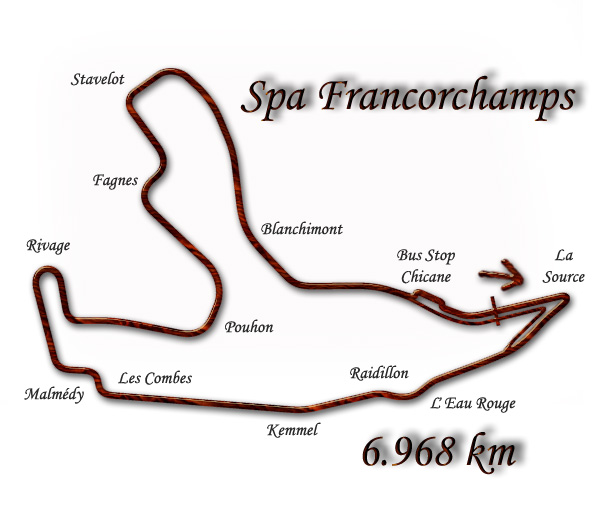

Race details
- Date: 2 June 1985
- Official name: Grand Prix F3000 de Belgique
- Location: Spa, Belgium
- Course: Spa-Francorchamps
- Course length: 6.940 km (4.312 miles)
- Distance: 29 laps, 201.260 km (125.048 miles)

Pole position
Driver	(France) Michel Ferté	Ralt-Cosworth
- Time: 2:11.195

Fastest lap
Driver	(New Zealand) Mike Thackwell	Ralt-Cosworth
- Time: 2:26.769

Podium
First	(New Zealand) Mike Thackwell	Ralt-Cosworth
Second	(France) Alain Ferté	March-Cosworth
Third	(Germany) Christian Danner	March-Cosworth

The inaugural Grand Prix F3000 de Belgique, was the sixth round of the 1985 International Formula 3000. This was held at Circuit de Spa-Francorchamps, on 2 June.

== Report ==
=== Entry ===
A total of 18 F3000 cars were entered for the event.

=== Qualifying ===
Michel Ferté took pole position for Oreca Motorsport, in their March Engineering-Cosworth 85B, averaging a speed of 131.195 mph.

=== Race ===
The race was held over 29 laps of the Circuit de Spa-Francorchamps. Mike Thackwell took the winner spoils for works Ralt team, driving their Ralt-Cosworth RT20. The Kiwi won in a time of 1hr 11:56.51mins., averaging a speed of 104.434 mph. Over 50 seconds adrift, was the second place car of Alain Ferté, driving Corbari Italia's March 85B. The podium was completed by the BS Automotive March of Christian Danner.

== Classification ==
=== Race result ===
Pos.	No.	Driver	Entrant	Car - Engine	Time, Laps	Reason Out
1st	1	(New Zealand) Mike Thackwell	Team Ralt	Ralt-Cosworth RT20	1hr 11:56.510	
2nd	22	(France) Alain Ferté	Corbari Italia	March-Cosworth 85B	1hr 12:46.546	
3rd	8	(Germany) Christian Danner	BS Automotive	March-Cosworth 85B	1hr 12:55.153	
4th	13	(Italy) Gabriele Tarquini	Sanremo Racing Srl	March-Cosworth 85B	1hr 12:57.814	
5th	33	(Italy) Guido Daccò	Sanremo Racing Srl	March-Cosworth 85B	1hr 13:37.044	
6th	21	(Argentina) Juan Manuel Fangio II	Corbari Italia	Lola-Cosworth T950	1hr 13:52.332	
7th	2	(Denmark) John Nielsen	Team Ralt	Ralt-Cosworth RT20	25	Engine
DNF	7	(Italy) Alberto Lenti	Sanremo Racing srl	March-Cosworth 85B	22	Engine
DNF	18	(Italy) Lamberto Leoni	PMC Motorsport	Williams-Cosworth FW08C	15	Brakes
DNF	15	(Scotland) Johnny Dumfries	Lola Motorsport	Lola-Cosworth T950	13	Accident
DNF	26	(Sweden) Slim Borgudd	Roger Cowman Racing	Arrows-Cosworth A6	12	Accident
DNF	10	(Switzerland) Mario Hytten	Onyx Racing	March-Cosworth 85B	11	Differential
DNF	25	(Belgium) Thierry Tassin	Eddie Jordan Racing	March-Cosworth 85B	8	Accident
DNF	4	(France) Olivier Grouillard	Oreca Motorsport	March-Cosworth 85B	6	Accident
DNF	3	(France) Michel Ferté	Oreca Motorsport	March-Cosworth 85B	4	Accident
DNF	5	(France) Philippe Streiff	Autos Gonfaronnaises Sportives	AGS-Cosworth JH20	4	Suspension
DNF	34	(Italy) Ivan Capelli	Genoa Racing	March-Cosworth 85B	4	Accident
DNF	9	(Italy) Emanuele Pirro	Onyx Racing	March-Cosworth 85B	3	Suspension

- Fastest lap: Mike Thackwell, 2:26.769secs. (106.163 mph)
