= 1979 Italian Formula Three Championship =

Seasons
- ← 1978 1980 →

The 1979 Campionato Italiano F3 season was the 15th season of the Italian Formula Three Championship.

== Campionato Italiano ==
Champion: (Italy) Piercarlo Ghinzani

Runner Up: (Italy) Michele Alboreto

=== Results ===
| Date | Round | Circuit | Winning driver | Winning team | Winning car |
|---|---|---|---|---|---|
| 18/03/79 | Rd.1 | (Italy) Vallelunga | (Italy) Piercarlo Ghinzani | Euroracing | March-Alfa Romeo 793 |
| 25/03/79 | Rd.2 | (Italy) Varano | (Italy) Guido Pardini | Scuderia Emiliani | Dallara-Toyota WD1 |
| 08/04/79 | Rd.3 | (Italy) Misano | (Italy) Piercarlo Ghinzani | Euroracing | March-Alfa Romeo 793 |
| 06/05/79 | Rd.4 | (Italy) Varano | (Italy) Guido Pardini | Scuderia Emiliani | Dallara-Toyota WD1 |
| 20/05/79 | Rd.5 | (Italy) Varano | (Italy) Piercarlo Ghinzani | Euroracing | March-Alfa Romeo 793 |
| 03/06/79 | Rd.6 | (Italy) Magione | (Italy) Michele Alboreto | Euroracing | March-Toyota 793 |
| 17/06/79 | Rd.7 | (Italy) Enna-Pergusa | (Italy) Piercarlo Ghinzani | Euroracing | March-Alfa Romeo 793 |
| 24/06/79 | Rd.8 | (Italy) Monza | (New Zealand) Mike Thackwell | March Engineering Ltd | March-Toyota 793 |
| 22/07/79 | Rd.9 | (Italy) Misano | (Italy) Michele Alboreto | Euroracing | March-Toyota 793 |
| 02/09/79 | Rd.10 | (Italy) Monza | (Italy) Piercarlo Ghinzani | Euroracing | March-Alfa Romeo 793 |
| 16/09/79 | Rd.11 | (Italy) Varano | (Italy) Piercarlo Ghinzani | Euroracing | March-Alfa Romeo 793 |
| 23/09/79 | Rd.12 | (Italy) Mugello | (Italy) Piercarlo Ghinzani | Euroracing | March-Alfa Romeo 793 |
| 30/09/79 | Rd.13 | (Italy) Monza | (Italy) Carlo Rossi | Carlo Rossi | Ralt-Toyota RT1 |
| 07/10/79 | Rd.14 | (Italy) Vallelunga | (Italy) Mauro Baldi | Mauro Baldi | March-Alfa Romeo 793 |
| 21/10/79 | Rd.15 | (Italy) Imola | (Italy) Michele Alboreto | Euroracing | March-Alfa Romeo 793 |

=== Table ===
Best 7 races to count

| Place | Driver | Car - Engine | Total |
|---|---|---|---|
| 1 | (Italy) Piercarlo Ghinzani | March-Alfa Romeo 793 | 63 (74) |
| 2 | (Italy) Michele Alboreto | March-Toyota 793; March-Alfa Romeo 793 | 47 (63) |
| 3 | (Italy) Mauro Baldi | March-Toyota 783; March-Toyota 793 | 35 |
| 4 | (Italy) Carlo Rossi | Ralt-Toyota RT1 | 31 (32) |
| 5 | (Italy) Luciano Pavesi | Ralt-Toyota RT1 | 29 |
| 6 | (Italy) Guido Pardini | Dallara-Toyota WD1 | 28 |
| 7 | (Italy) Robert Campominosi | Ralt-Toyota RT1; Ralt-Toyota RT3 | 27(29) |
| 8 | (Italy) Piero Necchi | Martini-Toyota MK27 | 23 |
| 9 | (Italy) Enzo Coloni | March-Toyota 783 | 13 |
| 10= | (Italy) Daniele Albertin | Ralt-Toyota RT1 | 8 |
| | (Italy) Corrado Fabi | March-Toyota 783 | |
| | etc. | | |
