= 1987 New Zealand International Formula Pacific season =

11th season of the New Zealand Formula Pacific Championship

1987 New Zealand Formula Pacific Championship

Seasons
- ← 1986 1988 →

The 1987 New Zealand Formula Pacific Championship (known for commercial reasons as the 1987 Mita Copies NZ International Formula Pacific Championship) was the 11th season of the New Zealand International Formula Pacific series. The season began at Baypark Raceway on December 28 in 1986 and concluded at Wigram Aerodrome on January 18 a few weeks later. The schedule included the 1987 New Zealand Grand Prix at Pukekohe Park Raceway.

The championship would be won by Mike Thackwell. It would turn out to be Thackwell's last championship victory before receding into retirement just over a year later.

== Race calendar ==
Rnd	Circuit	Date	Map
1986			1987 New Zealand International Formula Pacific season is located in New Zealand
1	Baypark Raceway (Mount Maunganui, Bay of Plenty Region)	28 December	1987 New Zealand International Formula Pacific season is located in New Zealand
1987			1987 New Zealand International Formula Pacific season is located in New Zealand
2	Pukekohe Park Raceway (Pukekohe, Auckland Region)	4 January	1987 New Zealand International Formula Pacific season is located in New Zealand
3	Manfeild Autocourse (Feilding, Manawatū District)	11 January	1987 New Zealand International Formula Pacific season is located in New Zealand
4	Wigram Airfield Circuit (Christchurch, Canterbury Region)	18 January	1987 New Zealand International Formula Pacific season is located in New Zealand

== Teams and drivers ==
All cars were fitted with a Ford BDD engine.

Entrant	Chassis	No	Driver	Rounds
Ralt Australia	Ralt RT4/86	1	(New Zealand) Mike Thackwell	All
Ralt Australia	Ralt RT4/86	2	(Australia) David Brabham	All
Graeme Lawrence Motorsport	Ralt RT4/86	4	(New Zealand) Brett Riley	1
Graeme Lawrence Motorsport	Ralt RT4/86	4	(United States) Davy Jones	2–4
Graeme Lawrence Motorsport	Ralt RT4/86	14	(New Zealand) Graeme Lawrence	1–2
Team CRC	Ralt RT4/82	5	(New Zealand) Craig Coleman	All
Garvin Brown Racing; David White Motorsport	Ralt RT4/86	6	(United States) David Kudrave	All
Garvin Brown Racing; David White Motorsport	Ralt RT4/86	8	(United States) Tony Hulman-George	All
JCL Group	Ralt RT4/81	7	(New Zealand) Peter Haskett	1–2, 4
Ken Smith Motorsport	Ralt RT4/86	11	(New Zealand) Ken Smith	All
Hammond International	March 77B	16	(New Zealand) Stuart McChesney	3–4
Stu Murphy	Ralt RT4/81	20	(New Zealand) Stu Murphy	All
Allan McCall Racing	Ralt RT4/86	55	(United States) Chris Kneifel	1–2
Allan McCall Racing	Ralt RT4/86	55	(United Kingdom) Calvin Fish	3–4
Hocking Motorsport	Ralt RT4/84	74	(Australia) Chris Hocking	1–2
Bob Creasy	Ralt RT4/82	76	(Australia) Bob Creasy	All
Cameron Motorsport	Ralt RT4/83	87	(United States) Michael Greenfield	1–3
Paul Radisich	Ralt RT4/83	89	(New Zealand) Paul Radisich	All

== Results and standings ==
=== Season summary ===
Rd		Circuit	Pole position	Winning driver	Winning team	Report
1	R1	Baypark Raceway	(New Zealand) Mike Thackwell	(New Zealand) Mike Thackwell	Ralt Australia	
1	R2	Baypark Raceway		(New Zealand) Mike Thackwell	Ralt Australia	
2	R1	Pukekohe Park Raceway	(United States) Davy Jones	(New Zealand) Mike Thackwell	Ralt Australia	Report
2	R2	Pukekohe Park Raceway		(United States) Davy Jones	Graeme Lawrence Motorsport	Report
3	R1	Manfeild Autocourse	(United States) Davy Jones	(United States) Davy Jones	Graeme Lawrence Motorsport	
3	R2	Manfeild Autocourse		(United States) Davy Jones	Graeme Lawrence Motorsport	
4	R1	Wigram Airfield Circuit	(New Zealand) Paul Radisich	(New Zealand) Paul Radisich	Paul Radisich	
4	R2	Wigram Airfield Circuit		(New Zealand) Paul Radisich	Paul Radisich	

=== Championship standings ===
Pos	Driver	BAY		PUK		MAN		WIG		Pts
Pos	Driver	R1	R2	R1	R2	R1	R2	R1	R2	Pts
1	(New Zealand) Mike Thackwell	1	1	1	2	3	Ret	2	2	49
2	(New Zealand) Paul Radisich	2	6	3	4	2	Ret	1	1	38
3	(United States) Davy Jones			2	1	1	1	Ret	6	34
4	(New Zealand) Ken Smith	4	Ret	4	3	Ret	2	3	3	24
5	(United States) David Kudrave	Ret	2	5	5	Ret	DNS	4	4	16
6	(Australia) David Brabham	6	Ret	7	6	4	3	6	5	12
7	(United States) Chris Kneifel	5	3	Ret	8					6
8	(United Kingdom) Calvin Fish					5	Ret	5	Ret	4
8	(New Zealand) Brett Riley	3	Ret							4
10	(United States) Michael Greenfield	Ret	5	6	7	DNA	DNA			3
10	(New Zealand) Peter Haskett	7	4	8	Ret			7	8	3
10	(United States) Tony Hulman-George	DNA	DNA	Ret	Ret	Ret	4	Ret	7	3
10	(Australia) Bob Creasy	9	7	9	9	6	5	8	9	3
14	(New Zealand) Stuart McChesney					7	6	DNA	DNA	1
-	(New Zealand) Stu Murphy	8	8	Ret	DNS	8	Ret	Ret	10	0
-	(New Zealand) Craig Coleman	Ret	Ret	DNA	DNA	Ret	Ret	DNA	DNA	0
-	(Australia) Chris Hocking	DNA	DNA	DNA	DNA					0
-	(New Zealand) Graeme Lawrence	DNA	DNA	DNA	DNA					0
Pos	Driver	R1	R2	R1	R2	R1	R2	R1	R2	Pts
Pos	Driver	BAY		PUK		MAN		WIG		Pts
