= 1985 BRDC International Trophy =

1985 BRDC International Trophy Grand Prix
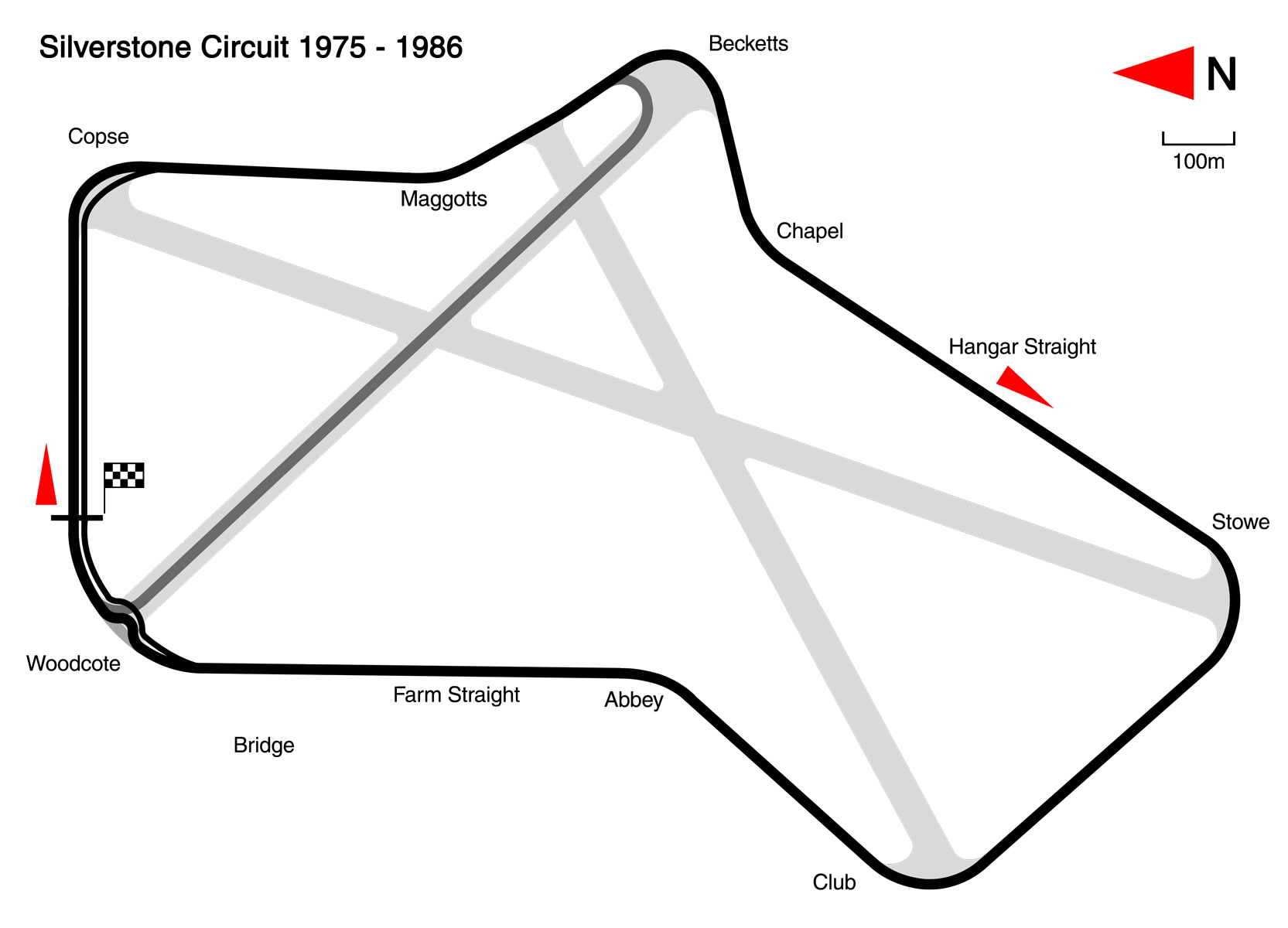

Race details
- Date: 24 March 1985
- Official name: 37th BRDC International Trophy
- Location: Northamptonshire, Great Britain
- Course: Silverstone Circuit
- Course length: 4.719 km (2.932 miles)
- Distance: 44 laps, 207.636 km (129.008 miles)

Pole position
| Driver | (France) Michel Ferté | Ralt-Cosworth |
- Time: 1:17.92

Fastest lap
| Driver | (Denmark) John Nielsen | Ralt-Cosworth |
- Time: 1:27.64

Podium
| First | (New Zealand) Mike Thackwell | Ralt-Cosworth |
| Second | (Denmark) John Nielsen | Ralt-Cosworth |
| Third | (France) Michel Ferté | March-Cosworth |

The 37th BRDC International Trophy, was the opening round of the 1985 International Formula 3000. The inaugural was held at Silverstone, on 24 March.

== Report ==
=== Entry ===
A total of 17 F3000 cars were entered for the first ever event. Every new formula sets new questions and this one was no exception; some teams ran ex-Formula One machinery, while the Lola T950 was based upon an IndyCar design, whereas Ralt and March drew upon their Formula Two experience.

=== Qualifying ===
Michel Ferté took pole position for Equipe Oreca, in their March Engineering-Cosworth 85B, averaging a speed of 135.404 mph.

=== Race ===
The race was held over 44 laps of the Silverstone Grand Prix circuit. Mike Thackwell wrote himself into the history books by winning the International Trophy for the third time and the first F3000 race in the process, driving a works Ralt RT20 from teammate John Nielsen in a similar car. Thackwell won in a time of 1hr 07:41.01mins., averaging a speed of 114.397 mph, with Nielsen over 34 seconds behind. The next three places were filled by March 85Bs in the hands of Michel Ferté, Christian Danner and Gabriele Tarquini, with the sixth place going to a Formula One Tyrrell 012, driven by Roberto Moreno.

== Classification ==
=== Race result ===
| Pos. | No. | Driver | Entrant | Car - Engine | Time, Laps | Reason Out |
|---|---|---|---|---|---|---|
| 1st | 1 | (New Zealand) Mike Thackwell | Team Ralt | Ralt-Cosworth RT20 | 1hr 07:41.01 | |
| 2nd | 2 | (Denmark) John Nielsen | Team Ralt | Ralt-Cosworth RT20 | 1hr 08:13.35 | |
| 3rd | 3 | (France) Michel Ferté | Oreca Motorsport | March-Cosworth 85B | 1hr 09:09.77 | |
| 4th | 8 | (Germany) Christian Danner | BS Automotive | March-Cosworth 85B | 43 | |
| 5th | 13 | (Italy) Gabriele Tarquini | Sanremo Racing Srl | March-Cosworth 85B | 42 | |
| 6th | 20 | (Brazil) Roberto Moreno | Barron Racing | Tyrrell-Cosworth 012 | 42 | |
| 7th | 9 | (Italy) Emanuele Pirro | Onyx Racing | March-Cosworth 85B | 41 | |
| 8th | 15 | (France) Alain Ferté | Lola Motorsport | Lola-Cosworth T950 | 41 | |
| 9th | 22 | (Switzerland) Mario Hytten | Corbari Italia | Lola-Cosworth T950 | 41 | |
| 10th | 7 | (Sweden) Tomas Kaiser | BS Automotive | March-Cosworth 85B | 39 | |
| NC | 17 | (Belgium) Thierry Tassin | PMC Motorsport | Williams-Cosworth FW08C | 38 | |
| NC | 18 | (Italy) Lamberto Leoni | PMC Motorsport | Williams-Cosworth FW08C | 38 | |
| DNF | 19 | (Italy) Claudio Langes | Barron Racing | Tyrrell-Cosworth 012 | 33 | Electrical |
| DNF | 5 | (France) Philippe Streiff | Autos Gonfaronnaises Sportives | AGS-Cosworth JH20 | 7 | Suspension |
| DNF | 10 | (United Kingdom) Johnny Dumfries | Onyx Racing | March-Cosworth 85B | 1 | Accident |
| DNF | 14 | (Italy) Alessandro Santin | Sanremo Racing Srl | March-Cosworth 85B | 0 | Accident |
| DNS | 4 | (Austria) ”Pierre Chauvet” | Onyx Racing | March-Cosworth 85B | | Accident |

- Fastest lap: John Nielsen, 1:27.64secs. (121.191 mph)
