= 1984 Mediterranean Grand Prix =

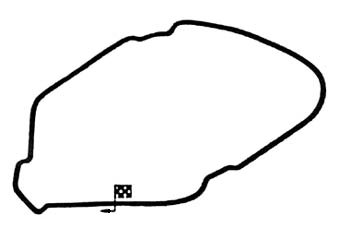

Race details
- Date: 29 July 1984
- Official name: 23rd Gran Premio del Mediterraneo
- Location: Pergusa, Sicily, Italy
- Course: Autodromo di Pergusa
- Course length: 4.950 km (3.076 miles)
- Distance: 45 laps, 222.750 km (138.420 miles)

Pole position
Driver	(New Zealand) Mike Thackwell	Ralt-Honda
- Time: 1:29.48

Fastest lap
Driver	(New Zealand) Mike Thackwell	Ralt-Honda
- Time: 1:30.09

Podium
First	(New Zealand) Mike Thackwell	Ralt-Honda
Second	(Brazil) Roberto Moreno	Ralt-Honda
Third	(Italy) Alessandro Nannini	Minardi-BMW

The 23rd Gran Premio del Mediterraneo (Grand Prix of the Mediterranean), was the ninth round of the 1984 European Championship for F2 Drivers. This was held on the Isle of Sicily, at the Autodromo di Pergusa, Enna, on 29 July.

== Report ==
=== Entry ===
As the F2 brigade arrived on the Isle of Sicily, the entry had reduced further to just 17 cars. Come qualifying, only 13 cars were on track. One of these, ”Pierre Chauvet” withdrew from the meeting as the weather was too hot for him.

=== Qualifying ===
Mike Thackwell took pole position for Ralt Racing Ltd, in their Ralt-Honda RH6, averaging a speed of 123.691 mph.

=== Race ===
The race was held over 45 laps of the hot Enna-Pergusa circuit. Mike Thackwell took the winner spoils for works Ralt team, driving their Ralt-Honda RH6. The Kiwi won in a time of 1hr 08:55.21ins., averaging a speed of 120.632 mph. Second place went to the other works Ralt driver, Roberto Moreno, completing their fourth 1-2 finish of the season. Moreno was just 2½ seconds behind Thackwell. The podium was completed by Alessandro Nannini in the Minardi Team’s M283. Nannini, along with fifth placed driver, Michel Ferté were disqualified for having underweight cars. They were later re-instated on appeal, but no race times were given for these drivers.

Thackwell's victory sealed him, the 1984 European Championship for F2 Drivers title.

== Classification ==
=== Race result ===
Pos.	No.	Driver	Entrant	Car - Engine	Time, Laps	Reason Out
1st	1	(New Zealand) Mike Thackwell	Ralt Racing Ltd	Ralt-Honda RH6	1hr 08:55.21	
2nd	2	(Brazil) Roberto Moreno	Ralt Racing Ltd	Ralt-Honda RH6	1hr 08:57.71	
3rd	10	(Italy) Alessandro Nannini	Minardi Team	Minardi-BMW M283		
4th	5	(France) Pierre Petit	Onyx Race Engineering	March-BMW 842	1hr 09:27.23	
5th	17	(France) Michel Ferté	Martini Racing, France/ORECA	Martini-BMW 001		
6th	4	(Italy) Emanuele Pirro	Onyx Race Engineering	March-BMW 842	1hr 10:21.32	
7th	44	(Sweden) Tomas Kaiser	PMC Motorsport / BS Automotive	March-BMW 842	44	
8th	15	(Italy) Guido Daccò	Sanremo Racing Srl	March-BMW 832	44	
9th	11	(Italy) Lamberto Leoni	Minardi Team	Minardi-BMW M283	42	Accident
DNF	66	(Germany) Christian Danner	PMC Motorsport / BS Automotive	March-BMW 842	37	Engine
DNF	6	(France) Philippe Streiff	AGS Elf (Armagnac Bigorre)	AGS-BMW JH19C	5	Clutch, spin
DNF	3	(Italy) Beppe Gabbiani	Onyx Race Engineering	March-BMW 842	2	Electrical
DNF	9	(Italy) Roberto Del Castello	Minardi Team	Minardi-BMW M283	1	Accident

- Fastest lap: Mike Thackwell, 1:30.09secs. (122.881 mph)

Alessandro Nannini and Michel Ferté were disqualified – cars underweight – but they were instated on appeal but no times were given.
