= Mediterranean Grand Prix =

- Autodromo di Pergusa
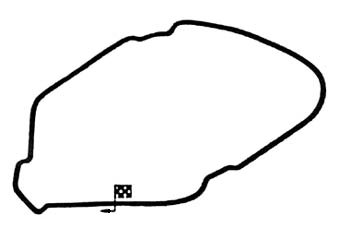

Race information
- Number of times held: 35
- First held: 1962
- Last held: 1998
- Most wins (drivers): (Switzerland) Jo Siffert (2) (Belgium) Thierry Boutsen (2) (New Zealand) Mike Thackwell (2)
- Most wins (constructors): (United Kingdom) Reynard (6)
- Circuit length: 4.950 km (3.076 miles)
- Laps: 40+

Last race (1998)

Pole position
- (Germany) N. Heidfeld; Lola-Zytek (West Competition)

Podium
- 1. (Colombia) J.P Montoya; Lola-Zytek (Super Nova); 2. (Germany) N. Heidfeld; Lola-Zytek (West Competition); 3. (France) S. Ayari; Lola-Zytek (Durango Formula)

Fastest lap
- (Colombia) J.P Montoya; Lola-Zytek (Super Nova Racing)

The Mediterranean Grand Prix was a non-Championship motor race, held at the Autodromo di Pergusa, in Sicily, Italy. The first event, run to Formula One rules, took place in 1962. The last Formula One event took place in 1965 before the race switched to Formula Two rules. In 1985, Formula Two was replaced by Formula 3000 and the Mediterranean Grand Prix remained on the calendar.

The event was scheduled to return in 2020 as part of the Euroformula Open Championship, but was cancelled due to the global coronavirus pandemic.

== Results ==
Year	Date	Winning driver	Winning constructor	Report
1962	19 August	(Italy) Lorenzo Bandini	Ferrari	Report
1963	18 August	(United Kingdom) John Surtees	Ferrari	Report
1964	16 August	(Switzerland) Jo Siffert	Brabham-BRM	Report
1965	15 August	(Switzerland) Jo Siffert	Brabham-BRM	Report
1966	Not held			
1967	20 August	(United Kingdom) Jackie Stewart	Matra-Ford	Report
1968	25 August	(Austria) Jochen Rindt	Brabham-Ford	Report
1969	24 August	(United Kingdom) Piers Courage	Brabham-Ford	Report
1970	23 August	(Switzerland) Clay Regazzoni	Tecno-Ford	Report
1971	Not held			
1972	20 August	(France) Henri Pescarolo	Brabham-Ford	Report
1973	27 August	(France) Jean-Pierre Jarier	March-BMW	Report
1974	25 August	(West Germany) Hans-Joachim Stuck	March-BMW	Report
1975	27 July	(France) Jacques Laffite	Martini-BMW	Report
1976	25 July	(France) René Arnoux	Martini-Renault	Report
1977	24 July	(Finland) Keke Rosberg	Chevron-Hart	Report
1978	23 July	(Italy) Bruno Giacomelli	March-BMW	Report
1979	29 July	(Sweden) Eje Elgh	March-BMW	Report
1980	2 August	(Italy) Siegfried Stohr	Toleman-Hart	Report
1981	26 July	(Belgium) Thierry Boutsen	March-BMW	Report
1982	1 August	(Belgium) Thierry Boutsen	Spirit-Honda	Report
1983	31 July	(United Kingdom) Jonathan Palmer	Ralt-Honda	Report
1984	29 July	(New Zealand) Mike Thackwell	Ralt-Honda	Report
1985	28 July	(New Zealand) Mike Thackwell	Ralt-Ford	Report
1986	20 July	(Spain) Luis Pérez-Sala	Ralt-Ford	Report
1987	19 July	(Brazil) Roberto Moreno	Ralt-Honda	Report
1988	17 July	(Italy) Pierluigi Martini	March-Judd	Report
1989	23 July	(Switzerland) Andrea Chiesa	Reynard-Ford	Report
1990	22 July	(Italy) Gianni Morbidelli	Lola-Ford	Report
1991	7 July	(Italy) Emanuele Naspetti	Reynard-Ford	Report
1992	12 July	(Italy) Luca Badoer	Reynard-Ford	Report
1993	18 July	(United Kingdom) David Coulthard	Reynard-Ford	Report
1994	17 July	(Brazil) Gil de Ferran	Reynard-Zytek Judd	Report
1995	23 July	(Brazil) Ricardo Rosset	Reynard-Ford	Report
1996	21 July	(Belgium) Marc Goossens	Lola-Zytek	Report
1997	20 July	(United Kingdom) Jamie Davies	Lola-Zytek	Report
1998	6 September	(Colombia) Juan Pablo Montoya	Lola-Zytek	Report
