= 1987 New Zealand Grand Prix =

- 33rd New Zealand Grand Prix
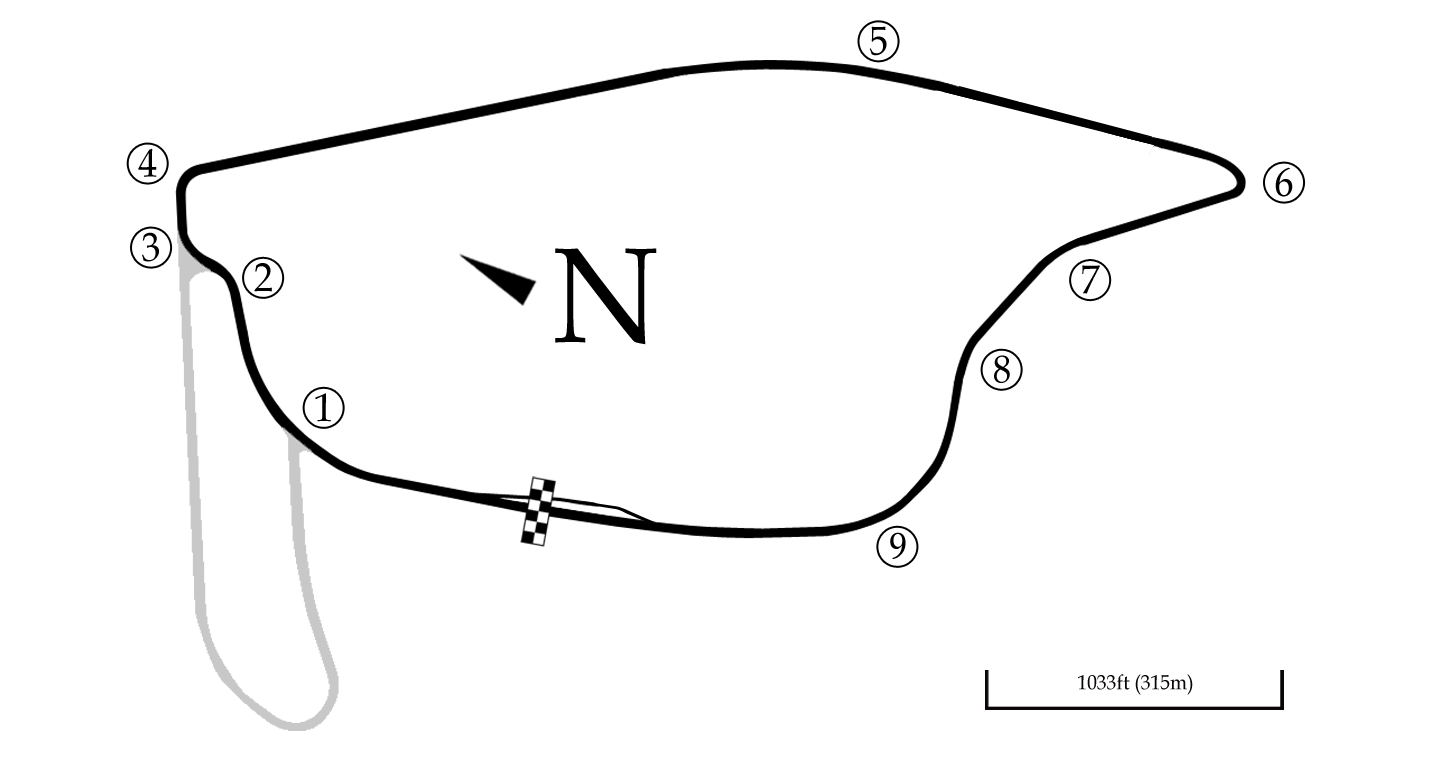

Race details
- Date: 4 January 1987
- Location: Pukekohe Park Raceway, Pukekohe, New Zealand
- Course: Permanent racing facility
- Course length: 2.82 km (1.76 miles)
- Distance: 40 laps, 112.8 km (70.4 miles)

Pole position
Driver	(United States) Davy Jones	Graeme Lawrence Motorsport
- Time: 0:59.53

Podium
First	(United States) Davy Jones	Graeme Lawrence Motorsport
Second	(New Zealand) Mike Thackwell	Ralt Australia
Third	(New Zealand) Ken Smith	Ken Smith Motorsport

1987 New Zealand Grand Prix was a race held at the Pukekohe Park Raceway on 4 January 1987. It was the 33rd running of the New Zealand Grand Prix and served as the second round of the New Zealand Formula Pacific Series.

The race was won by American Davy Jones. The podium was completed by local drivers Mike Thackwell and Ken Smith.

== Classification ==
=== Race ===
Pos	No.	Driver	Entrant	Laps	Time/Retired	Grid
1	4	(United States) Davy Jones	Graeme Lawrence Motorsport	40	38min 57.440sec	1
2	1	(New Zealand) Mike Thackwell	Ralt Australia	40	+ 3.11	
3	11	(New Zealand) Ken Smith	Ken Smith Motorsport	40	+ 20.12	
4	89	(New Zealand) Paul Radisich	Paul Radisich	40	+ 27.66	
5	6	(United States) David Kudrave	Garvin Brown Racing	40	+ 32.40	
6	2	(Australia) David Brabham	Ralt Australia	40	+ 44.75	
7	87	(United States) Michael Greenfield	Cameron Motorsport	40	+ 46.49	
8	55	(United States) Chris Kneifel	Allan McCall Racing	39	+ 1 lap	
9	76	(Australia) Bob Creasy	Bob Creasy	37	+ 3 laps	
Ret	8	(United States) Tony Holeman-George	Garvin Brown Racing	17	Engine	
Ret	7	(New Zealand) Peter Haskett	JCL Group	3	Accident	
DNS	5	(New Zealand) Craig Coleman	Team CRC	0	Did Not Start	
DNS	14	(New Zealand) Graeme Lawrence	Graeme Lawrence Motorsport	0	Did Not Start	
DNS	74	(Australia) Chris Hocking	Chris Hocking Racing	0	Did Not Start	
DNA	87	(United States) Riley Hopkins	Cameron Motorsport	0	Did Not Attend	

Preceded by 1986 New Zealand Grand Prix	New Zealand Grand Prix; 1987	Succeeded by 1988 New Zealand Grand Prix
