= BRDC International Trophy =

- Silverstone Circuit
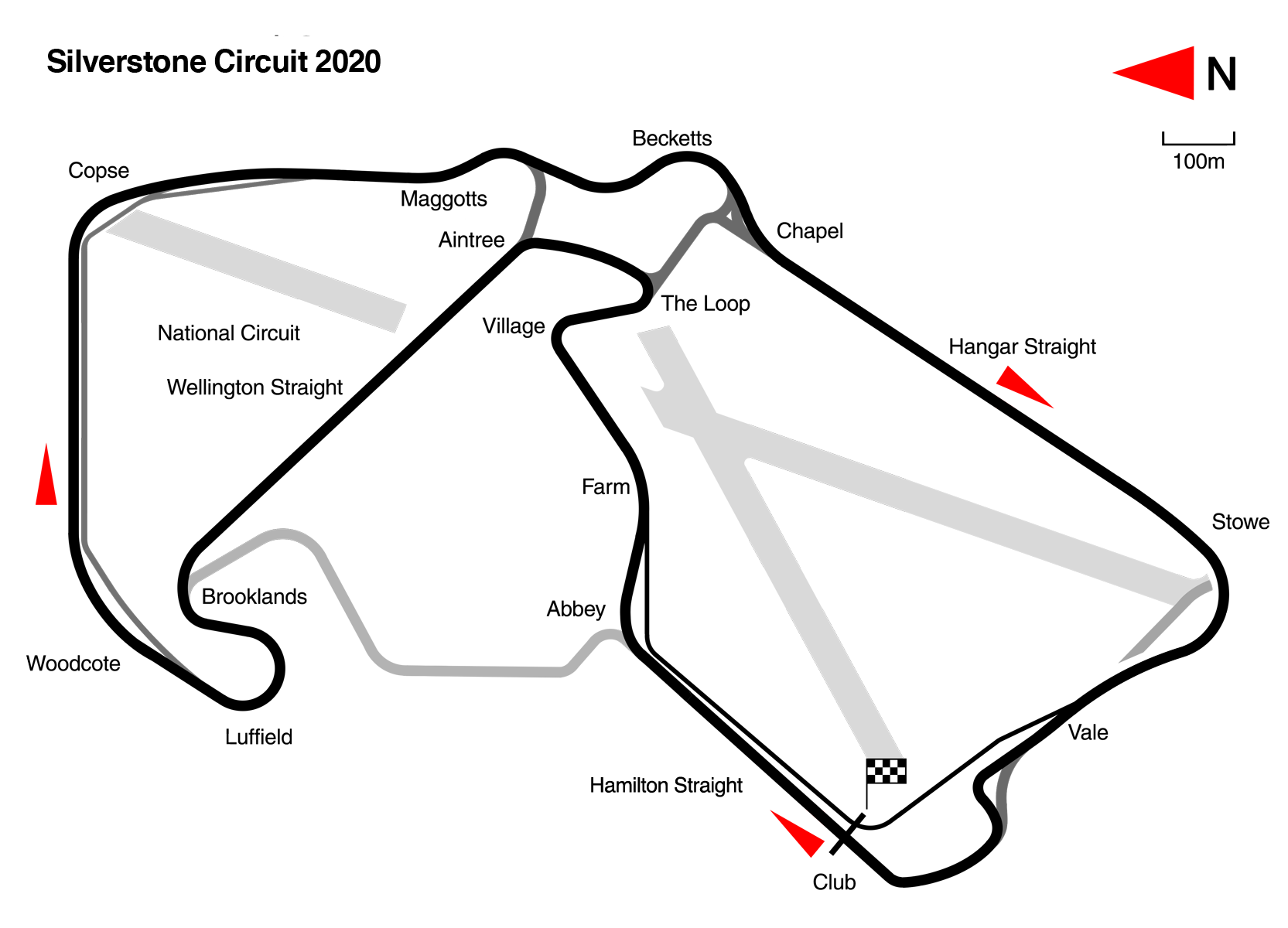

Race information
- Number of times held: 56
- First held: 1949
- Last held: 2026
- Most wins (drivers): Jack Brabham (4)
- Circuit length: 5.891 km (3.66 miles)

Last race (2026)

Pole position
- (Australia) George Proudford-Nalder

Podium
- 1. (Australia) George Proudford-Nalder; Virtuosi Racing; 26:50.306; 2. (United Kingdom) Lewis Werrell; JHR Developments; +0.158; 3. (United Arab Emirates) Theo Palmer; Hitech; +5.188

Fastest lap
- (United Kingdom) Lewis Werrell; JHR Developments; 2:03.036

BRDC International Trophy Logo

The BRDC International Trophy design by Alastair Gibson from Carbon Art 45 commissioned by Silverstone and The BRDC

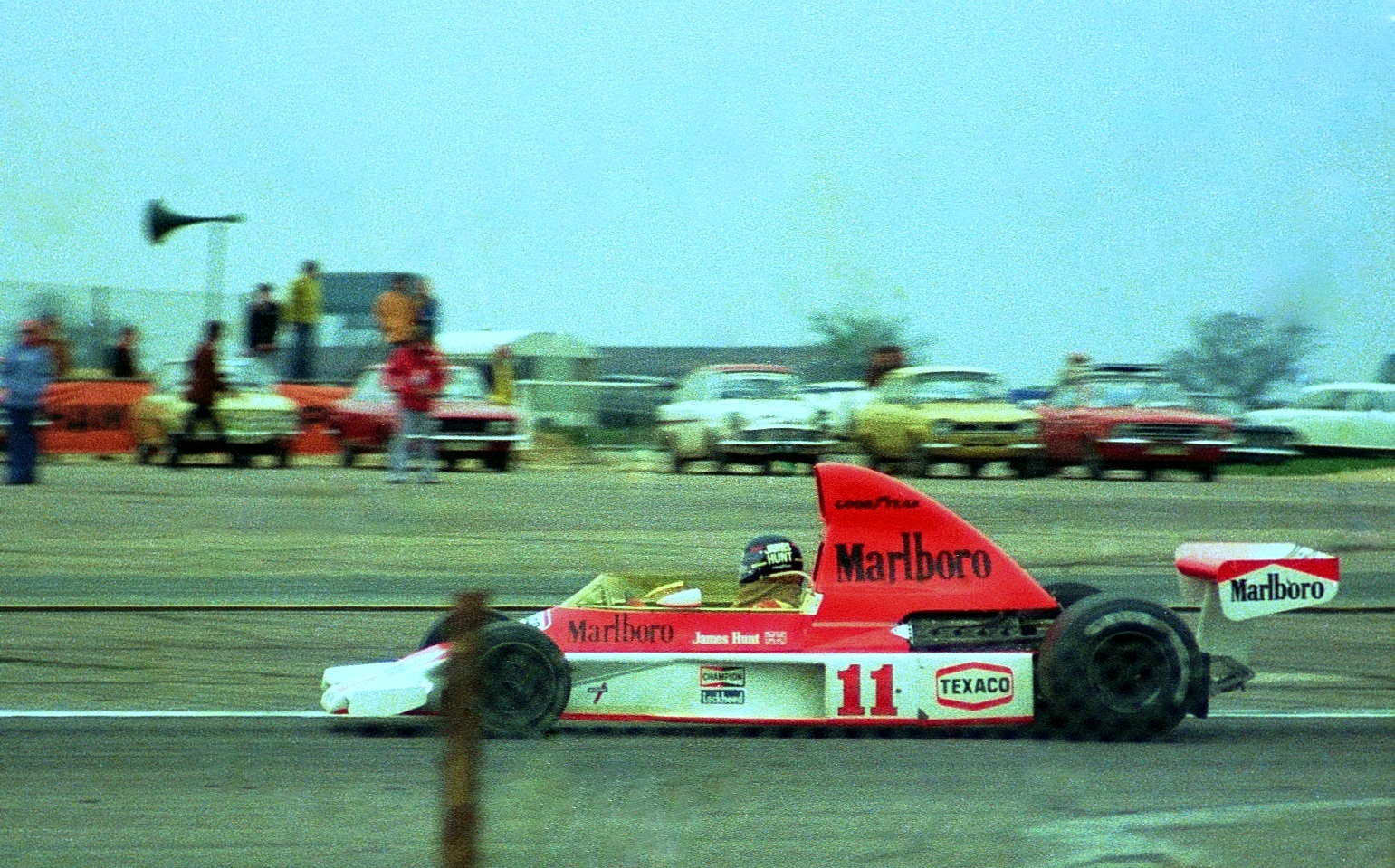
James Hunt racing at the 1976 BRDC International Trophy

The BRDC International Trophy is a prize awarded annually by the British Racing Drivers' Club to the winner of a motor race held at the Silverstone Circuit, England. For many years it formed the premier non-championship Formula One event in Britain, alongside the Race of Champions at Brands Hatch.

== History ==
=== Formula 1 ===
The event was instituted by the British Racing Drivers' Club (BRDC) in August 1949, sponsored by the Daily Express newspaper, for cars meeting contemporary Grand Prix motor racing regulations. The BRDC drew the name from that of an extinct event formerly held at the Brooklands circuit in the early 1930s. The first Silverstone event was the first to use the former airfield's perimeter roadways rather than the main runways, a circuit layout that persisted for over forty years.

With the introduction of the new World Championship, in 1950 the International Trophy became a non-championship race held to Formula One rules. The 1950 event was again held in August, but from 1951 onwards – apart from 1957 – the International Trophy was contested in April or May, near the beginning of the World Championship season. The timing of the event often attracted many top teams and drivers, allowing them to practise in racing conditions before the season became too serious. From 1952 the trophy was also sporadically opened to drivers in the Formula Two category, as well as being run to F2 regulations in those years that the World Championship was also. 1978 saw the 30th running of the International Trophy, and the last under these rules; with the increasing complexity of F1 cars it simply became too expensive for teams to contest non-championship events.

=== Formula 2 & F3000 ===
From 1979, the trophy continued as a Formula Two-only event. When F2 was replaced at the end of 1984, the trophy switched to the new Formula 3000 rules from 1985. In turn, it was replacement of F3000 by GP2 in 2005 that ended the International Trophy as an event for cutting-edge racing cars.

=== Formula 4 ===
In 2026, the trophy returned after a 21-year-hiatus, being awarded to the driver which won race three of the F4 British Championship's Silverstone round.

== Winners of the International Trophy ==
=== 1949–1980: Formula One years ===
Year	Driver	Constructor	Report
1949	Alberto Ascari	Ferrari	Report
1950	Giuseppe Farina	Alfa Romeo	Report
1951	Reg Parnell	Ferrari	Report
1952	Lance Macklin	HWM-Alta	Report
1953	Mike Hawthorn	Ferrari	Report
1954	José Froilán González	Ferrari	Report
1955	Peter Collins	Maserati	Report
1956	Stirling Moss	Vanwall	Report
1957	Jean Behra	BRM	Report
1958	Peter Collins	Ferrari	Report
1959	Jack Brabham	Cooper-Climax	Report
1960	Innes Ireland	Lotus-Climax	Report
1961	Stirling Moss	Cooper-Climax	Report
1962	Graham Hill	BRM	Report
1963	Jim Clark	Lotus-Climax	Report
1964	Jack Brabham	Brabham-Climax	Report
1965	Jackie Stewart	BRM	Report
1966	Jack Brabham	Brabham-Repco	Report
1967	Mike Parkes	Ferrari	Report
1968	Denny Hulme	McLaren-Ford	Report
1969	Jack Brabham	Brabham-Ford	Report
1970	Chris Amon	March-Cosworth	Report
1971	Graham Hill	Brabham-Cosworth	Report
1972	Emerson Fittipaldi	Lotus-Ford	Report
1973	Jackie Stewart	Tyrrell-Ford	Report
1974	James Hunt	Hesketh-Cosworth	Report
1975	Niki Lauda	Ferrari	Report
1976	James Hunt	McLaren-Ford	Report
1978	Keke Rosberg	Theodore-Cosworth	Report
1980	Eliseo Salazar	Williams-Cosworth	Report

In 1952 and 1953, the race was run to Formula Two, while the 1961 race was held for the short lived Intercontinental Formula. The 1980 event formed a round of the 1980 British Formula One Championship.

=== 1977–1984: Formula Two years ===
Year	Driver	Constructor	Report
1977	René Arnoux	Renault-Gordini	Report
1979	Eddie Cheever	Osella-BMW	Report
1981	Mike Thackwell	Ralt-Honda	Report
1982	Stefan Bellof	Maurer-BMW/Heidegger	Report
1983	Beppe Gabbiani	March-BMW/Rosche	Report
1984	Mike Thackwell	Ralt-Honda/Mugen	Report

=== 1985–2004: Formula 3000 years ===
Year	Driver	Constructor	Report
1985	Mike Thackwell	Ralt-Cosworth	Report
1986	Pascal Fabre	Lola-Cosworth	Report
1987	Maurício Gugelmin	Ralt-Honda	Report
1988	Roberto Moreno	Reynard-Cosworth	Report
1989	Thomas Danielsson	Reynard-Cosworth	Report
1990	Allan McNish	Lola-Mugen Honda	Report
1991	Not held, due to track refurbishment		
1992	Jordi Gené	Reynard-Mugen Honda	Report
1993	Gil de Ferran	Reynard-Cosworth	Report
1994	Franck Lagorce	Reynard-Cosworth	Report
1995	Ricardo Rosset	Reynard-Cosworth	Report
1996	Kenny Bräck	Lola-Zytek	Report
1997	Tom Kristensen	Lola-Zytek	Report
1998	Juan Pablo Montoya	Lola-Zytek	Report
1999	Nicolas Minassian	Lola-Zytek	Report
2000	Mark Webber	Lola-Zytek	Report
2001	Sébastien Bourdais	Lola-Zytek	Report
2002	Tomáš Enge	Lola-Zytek Judd	Report
2003	Björn Wirdheim	Lola-Zytek Judd	Report
2004	Vitantonio Liuzzi	Lola-Zytek Judd	Report

=== 2026– British F4 ===
Year	Driver	Constructor	Report
2026	George Proudford-Nalder	Tatuus-Abarth	Report
