= 1979 Gran Premio della Lotteria =

Open-wheel motor race

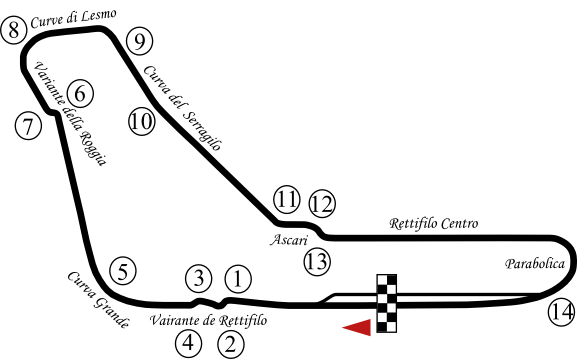
Layout of the Autodromo Nazionale di Monza (1976-1993)

The 21st Gran Premio Lotteria di Monza, made up the 8th round of the 1979 FIA European Championship, saw the series move to Autodromo Nazionale Monza, on June 24, 1979. This race was also round 8 of the Campionato Italian.

== Report ==
=== Entry ===
A grand total of 72 F3 cars were entered for the event. They were split into 3 groups.

=== Qualifying ===
The Italian Championship front runners took pole position for Heats 1 and 2. Piercarlo Ghinzani took the pole for the Euroracing Srl team in his March-Toyota 793 for the Heat 1; teammate, Michele Alboreto, headed the grid for Heat 2. Mike Thackwell, from the British F3 series, took the pole for Heat 3 in his works entered as March-Toyota 793.

=== Heats ===
Each heat was held over 8 laps of the historic Monza circuit. The victor of Heat 1 was Piercarlo Ghinzani from Guido Cappellotto. Heat 2 went to another Italian, Mauro Baldi, followed by Michele Alboreto. The final heat, Heat 3, saw Mike Thackwell take the chequered flag ahead of Carlo Rossi. The Championship leader, Alain Prost, only finished 13th in Heat 1 and did not progress into the final heat.

=== Final ===
The final was held over 17 laps of the Monza circuit. Mike Thackwell was the winner for the March Engineering Ltd. team driving their March-Toyota 793. The kiwi won in a time of 32:13.33 minutes averaging a speed of 114.086 mph. Second place went to Mauro Baldi in his privately entered March-Toyota 793; he was exactly 1.1 seconds behind the winner. In third place was Michele Alboreto in his Euroracing Srl-entered March.

== Classification ==
=== Final ===
| Pos. | No. | Driver | Entrant | Car - Engine | Time, Laps | Reason Out |
|---|---|---|---|---|---|---|
| 1st | 32 | (New Zealand) Mike Thackwell | March Engineering Ltd | March-Toyota 793 | 32:13.33 | |
| 2nd | 2 | (Italy) Mauro Baldi | Mauro Baldi | March-Toyota 793 | 32:14.43 | |
| 3rd | 6 | (Italy) Michele Alboreto | Euroracing Srl | March-Toyota 793 | 32:16.63 | |
| 4th | 7 | (Italy) Piercarlo Ghinzani | Euroracing Srl | March-Alfa Romeo 793 | 32:18.71 | |
| 5th | 14 | (Italy) Carlo Rossi | Carlo Rossi | Ralt-Toyota RT1 | 32:20.34 | |
| 6th | 69 | (Italy) Daniele Albertin | Marlboro Vatellina Racing Team | Ralt-Toyota RT1 | 32:21.11 | |
| 7th | 4 | (France) Richard Dallest | Ecurie Elf | Martini-Toyota MK27 | 32:39.80 | |
| 8th | 82 | (Italy) Enzo Coloni | Enzo Coloni | March-Toyota 783 | 32:41.36 | |
| 9th | 9 | (Germany) Michael Korten | Klaus Zimmermann Racing Team | March-Toyota 793 | 32:48.03 | |
| 10th | 29 | (Italy) Piero Necchi | Astra Racing Team | March-Toyota 793 | 32:49.03 | |
| 11th | 42 | (Italy) Gianluca Messini | Trivellato Racing | Chevron-Toyota B47 | 32:52.78 | |
| 12th | 19 | (Italy) Luciano Pavesi | Pavesi Racing | Ralt-Alfa Romeo RT1 | 32:54.74 | |
| 13th | 87 | (Italy) Cesare Passoli | Cesare Passoli | Ralt-Toyota RT1 | 32:55.88 | |
| 14th | 53 | (Austria) Walter Lechner | RT Gätmo Tuning | March-Toyota 783 | 32:56.51 | |
| 15th | 65 | (Switzerland) Fredy Schnarwiler | Formel Rennsport Club | March-Toyota 793 | 33:09.39 | |
| 16th | 8 | (Netherlands) Arie Luyendijk | Racing Team Holland | Argo-Toyota JM3 | 33:41.53 | |
| 17th | 83 | (Italy) Pasquale Zullo | Pasquale Zullo | March-Toyota 783 | 33:49.89 | |
| 18th | 3 | (Netherlands) Michael Bleekemolen | Roger Heavens Racing | March-Toyota 793 | 34:00.07 | |
| 19th | 24 | (Italy) Guido Cappellotto | Guido Cappellotto | Ralt-Toyota RT1 | 16 | |
| 20th | 48 | (Switzerland) Jo Zeller | Formel Rennsport Club | March-Toyota 783 | 16 | |
| 21st | 17 | (Switzerland) Jakob Bordoli | Scuderia Calanda | Ralt-Toyota RT1 | 12 | |
| DNF | 81 | (Italy) Gianluca Bagnara | Gianluca Bagnara | March-Toyota 783 | 6 | |
| DNF | 57 | (Italy) Oscar Pedersoli | Oscar Pedersoli | March-Toyota 783 | 4 | |
| DNF | 45 | (Italy) Fernanro Cazzaniga | Scuderia dei Longobardi | March-Toyota 783 | 3 | Accident |
| DNF | 25 | (Italy) Guido Dacco | Guido Dacco | March-Toyota 783 | 3 | |
| DNF | 64 | (Italy) Rodolfo Bellini | Scuderia Emiliani | Dallara-Toyota WD1 | 3 | |
| DNF | 62 | (France) Bernard Perroy | Ecurie Montesanto | Duqueine-Toyota VG3 | 3 | |
| DNQ | 1 | (France) Alain Prost | Ecurie Elf | Martini-Renault MK27 | | |
| DNQ | 5 | (Monaco) Daimon Metrebian | Ecurie Elf | Martini-Toyota MK21 | | |
| DNQ | 11 | (Italy) Augusto Avanzini | Scuderia Derby | March-Toyota 793 | | |
| DNQ | 12 | (Italy) Silvano Colciago | Silvano Colciago | Ralt-Toyota RT1 | | |
| DNQ | 15 | (Italy) Giampiero Consonni | Scuderia Escolette | Ralt-Toyota RT1 | | |
| DNQ | 16 | (Italy) Roberto Campominosi | Pavesi Racing | Ralt-Alfa Romeo RT1 | | |
| DNQ | 18 | (Austria) Martin-Hans Mayer | Martin-Hans Mayer | Ralt-Toyota RT1 | | |
| DNQ | 21 | (Italy) Riccardo Paletti | Riccardo Paletti | March-Toyota 793 | | |
| DNQ | 22 | (Italy) Vinicio Salmi | Vinicio Salmi | March-Toyota 783 | | |
| DNQ | 23 | (Italy) Sergio Leone | Sergio Leone | Ralt-Toyota RT1 | | |
| DNQ | 26 | (Italy) Renato Dotta | Renato Dotta | March-Toyota 783 | | |
| DNQ | 27 | (Italy) Roberto Manzoni | Roberto Manzoni | Ralt-Toyota RT1 | | |
| DNQ | 28 | (Italy) Marcello Rosei | Marcello Rosei | March-Toyota 773 | | |
| DNQ | 31 | (Italy) Gianni Giudici | Gianni Giudici | Osella-Toyota | | |
| DNQ | 33 | (Italy) Filippo Baj | Filippo Baj | Ralt-Toyota RT1 | | |
| DNQ | 34 | (Italy) Fernando Spreafico | Fernando Spreafico | Chevron-Toyota B38 | | |
| DNQ | 35 | (Italy) Giovanni Bertaccini | Giovanni Bertaccini | Ralt-Toyota RT1 | | |
| DNQ | 36 | (Italy) Guido Pardini | Guido Pardini | Dallara-Toyota WD1 | | |
| DNQ | 37 | (Austria) Karl Schuchnig | KWS Motorsport | Chevron-Toyota B47 | | |
| DNQ | 38 | (England) Alan Smith | KWS Motorsport | Chevron-Toyota B47 | | |
| DNQ | 39 | (Belgium) Thierry Boutsen | Roger Heavens Racing | March-Toyota 793 | | |
| DNQ | 41 | (Italy) Enrico Uncini | Marlboro Valtellina Racing Team | Ralt-Toyota RT1 | | |
| DNQ | 43 | (Italy) Almo Coppelli | Trivellato Racing | Chevron-Toyota B47 | | |
| DNQ | 44 | (Italy) Massimo Fabiani | Massimo Fabiani | March-Toyota 783 | | |
| DNQ | 46 | (Italy) Pietro Villa | Pietro Villa | March-Toyota 793 | | |
| DNQ | 47 | (Italy) Marcello Capriani | Marcello Capriani | Ralt-Toyota RT1 | | |
| DNQ | 49 | (Switzerland) Jean-Pierre Rochat | Jean-Pierre Rochat | Ralt-Toyota RT1 | | |
| DNQ | 51 | (Austria) Franz Konrad | Klaus Zimmermann Racing | March-Toyota 793 | | |
| DNQ | 52 | (Austria) Walter Schöch | Walter Schöch Racing | Ralt-Toyota RT1 | | |
| DNQ | 54 | (Austria) Jo Gartner | Jim Beam Team | Martini-Renault MK27 | | |
| DNQ | 55 | (France) Philippe Streiff | Ecurie Motul Nogaro | Martini-Renault MK27 | | |
| DNQ | 56 | (Italy) Fulvio Ballabio | Fulvio Ballabio | Branca-Toyota | | |
| DNQ | 58 | (France) Alain Hubert | Kores Racing | Lola-Renault T770 | | |
| DNQ | 59 | (France) Philippe Alliot | Kores Racing | Lola-Renault T770 | | |
| DNQ | 61 | (Italy) Bruno Pescia | Bruno Pescia | March-Toyota 793 | | |
| DNQ | 63 | (Germany) Helmut Henzler | Volkswagen Motorsport – Spiess Tuning | March-Volkswagen 793 | | |
| DNQ | 66 | (Italy) Massimo Valentini | Scuderia Emiliani | Dallara-Toyota WD1 | | |
| DNQ | 67 | (Switzerland) Bruno Eichmann | Lista Racing Team | Argo-BMW JM3 | | |
| DNQ | 68 | (Switzerland) Jürg Lienhard | Lista Racing Team | March-Toyota 793 | | |
| DNQ | 84 | (Switzerland) Marcel Wittstein | Formel Rennsport Club | Ralt-Toyota RT1 | | |
| DNQ | 85 | (Italy) Guido Regosa | Edo Squadra Corse | Bellasi-Toyota | | |
| DNQ | 86 | (Italy) Constante Antonelli | Constante Antonelli | Lola-Toyota T730 | | |
| DNQ | 88 | (Italy) Marzio Romano | Marzio Romano | March-Toyota 793 | | |
| DNQ | 89 | (Italy) Leonardo Verrelli | Leonardo Verrelli | Ralt-Toyota RT1 | | |
| DNQ | 91 | (France) Jean-Pierre Traschel | Jean-Pierre Traschel | Lola-BMW T570 | | |

- Fastest lap: Mike Thackwell, 1:52.50secs. (115.326 mph)

=== Heat 1 ===
| Pos. | Driver | Time |
|---|---|---|
| 1st | Ghinzani | 15:17.95 |
| 2nd | Cappellotto | 15:25.31 |
| 3rd | Dallest | 15:25.70 |
| 4th | Luyendijk | 15:30.13 |
| 5th | Korten | 15:30.67 |
| 6th / DQ | Campominosi | 15:32.12 |
| 7th | Messini | 15:33.98 |
| 8th | Passoli | 15:37.52 |
| 9th | Dacco | 15:41.41 |
| 10th | Zeller | 15:44.03 |
| 11th | Eichmann | 15:44.49 |
| 12th | Bertaccini | 15:54.09 |
| 13th | Prost | |
| DNF | Boutsen | Clutch |
| DNF | Metrebian | Accident damage |
| | etc.. | |

Roberto Campominosi (Pavesi Racing Ralt-Alfa Romeo) was disqualified from Heat 1, due to a leaking airbox.

=== Heat 2 ===
| Pos. | Driver | Time |
|---|---|---|
| 1st | Baldi | 15:17.60 |
| 2nd | Alboreto | 15:19.91 |
| 3rd | Pedersoli | 15:20.74 |
| 4th | Bleekemolen | 15:21.65 |
| 5th | Lechner | 15:33.98 |
| 6th | Perroy | 15:47.71 |
| 7th | Bagnara | 15:48.70 |
| 8th | Valentini | 16:03.86 |
| 9th | Zullo | 16:08.06 |
| 10th | Ballabio | |
| 11th | Rosei | |
| DNF | Paletti | Accident damage |
| | etc.. | |

=== Heat 3 ===
| Pos. | Driver | Time |
|---|---|---|
| 1st | Thackwell | 15:18.18 |
| 2nd | Rossi | 15:19.20 |
| 3rd | Coloni | 15:23.07 |
| 4th | Necchi | 15:24.77 |
| 5th | Cazzaniga | 15:28.97 |
| 6th | Albertin | 15:29.38 |
| 7th | Pavesi | 15:30.11 |
| 8th | Bordoli | 15:30.71 |
| 9th | Schnarwiler | 15:34.43 |
| 10th | Leone | 15:38.66 |
| 11th | Streiff | 15:44.05 |
| 12th | Verrelli | 15:44.81 |
| DNF | Cipriani | |
| | etc.. | |
