= 1962 Mediterranean Grand Prix =

- Non-championship race in the 1962 Formula One season

Race details
- Date: 19 August 1962
- Official name: I Gran Premio del Mediterraneo
- Location: Autodromo di Pergusa, Sicily
- Course: Permanent racing facility
- Course length: 4.803 km (2.985 miles)
- Distance: 50 laps, 240.15 km (149.3 miles)

Pole position
Driver	(Italy) Lorenzo Bandini	Ferrari
- Time: 1:21.5

Fastest lap
Drivers	(Italy) Lorenzo Bandini	Ferrari
	(Italy) Giancarlo Baghetti	Ferrari
- Time: 1:20.9

Podium
First	(Italy) Lorenzo Bandini	Ferrari
Second	(Italy) Giancarlo Baghetti	Ferrari
Third	(Italy) Carlo Abate	Porsche

The 1st Mediterranean Grand Prix was a motor race, run for Formula One cars, held on 19 August 1962 at the Autodromo di Pergusa, Sicily. The race was run over 50 laps of the circuit, and was dominated by Ferrari. The winner was Lorenzo Bandini in a Ferrari 156.

== Results ==
Pos	Driver	Entrant	Constructor	Time/Retired	Grid
1	(Italy) Lorenzo Bandini	SEFAC Ferrari	Ferrari	1.09:25.8	1
2	(Italy) Giancarlo Baghetti	SEFAC Ferrari	Ferrari	+ 32.5 s	2
3	(Italy) Carlo Abate	Scuderia SSS Republica di Venezia	Porsche	+ 1 Lap	4
4	(Switzerland) Jo Siffert	Ecurie Filipinetti	Lotus-Climax	+ 2 Laps	3
5	(France) Bernard Collomb	Bernard Collomb	Cooper-Climax	+ 5 Laps	8
6	(Italy) Roberto Lippi	Scuderia Settecolli	De Tomaso-O.S.C.A.	+ 6 Laps	11
7	(United Kingdom) Keith Greene	Gilby Engineering	Gilby-BRM	+ 9 Laps	7
8	(Germany) Wolfgang Seidel	Autosport Team Wolfgang Seidel	Lotus-BRM	+ 10 Laps	10
9	(Germany) Günther Seiffert	Autosport Team Wolfgang Seidel	Lotus-Climax	+ 30 Laps	12
Ret	(Switzerland) Heinz Schiller	Ecurie Filipinetti	Porsche	Oil leak	5
Ret	(Italy) Nino Vaccarella	Scuderia SSS Republica di Venezia	Lotus-Climax	Engine	6
Ret	(Italy) Wal Ever	Wal Ever	Cooper-O.S.C.A.	Engine	13
DNS	(Switzerland) Heini Walter	Ecurie Filipinetti	Lotus-BRM	Withdrawn after practice	(9)
WD	(Italy) Umberto Filotico	Umberto Filotico	Cooper-Climax		-
WD	(United States) Jay Chamberlain	Ecurie Excelsior	Lotus-Climax	Car in Sweden	-
WD	(Germany) Kurt Kuhnke	Kurt Kuhnke	Lotus-Borgward	Car not ready	-
WD	(United Kingdom) Peter Arundell	Team Lotus	Lotus-BRM		-

Previous race: 1962 Kanonloppet	Formula One non-championship races 1962 season	Next race: 1962 Danish Grand Prix
Previous race: —	Mediterranean Grand Prix	Next race: 1963 Mediterranean Grand Prix
