= 1963 Mediterranean Grand Prix =

- Non-championship race in the 1963 Formula One season

Race details
- Date: 18 August 1963
- Official name: II Gran Premio del Mediterraneo
- Location: Autodromo di Pergusa, Sicily
- Course: Permanent racing facility
- Course length: 4.803 km (2.985 miles)
- Distance: 60 laps, 288.172 km (179.062 miles)

Pole position
Driver	(United Kingdom) John Surtees	Ferrari
- Time: 1:16.1

Fastest lap
Driver	(United Kingdom) John Surtees	Ferrari
- Time: 1:15.9

Podium
First	(United Kingdom) John Surtees	Ferrari
Second	(United Kingdom) Peter Arundell	Lotus-Climax
Third	(Italy) Lorenzo Bandini	BRM

The 1963 Mediterranean Grand Prix was a motor race, run to Formula One rules, held on 18 August 1963 at the Autodromo di Pergusa, Sicily. The second running of the Mediterranean Grand Prix, the race was run over 60 laps of the circuit, and was dominated by British driver John Surtees in a Ferrari 156.

British driver Trevor Taylor suffered an accident during the race, in which he was thrown out of his Lotus 25 with fairly minor injuries, before the car broke up and caught fire.

== Results ==
Pos	Driver	Entrant	Constructor	Time/Retired	Grid
1	(United Kingdom) John Surtees	SEFAC Ferrari	Ferrari	1.18:00.8	1
2	(United Kingdom) Peter Arundell	Team Lotus	Lotus-Climax	+ 17.4 s	6
3	(Italy) Lorenzo Bandini	Scuderia Centro Sud	BRM	+ 17.7 s	2
4	(Sweden) Jo Bonnier	Rob Walker Racing Team	Cooper-Climax	58 laps	8
5	(Switzerland) Jo Siffert	Siffert Racing Team	Lotus-BRM	57 laps	5
6	(United Kingdom) Bob Anderson	DW Racing Enterprises	Lola-Climax	57 laps	4
7	(Portugal) Mário Cabral	Scuderia Centro Sud	Cooper-Climax	57 laps	7
8	(Italy) Carlo Abate	Count Volpi	Porsche	54 laps	10
9	(Switzerland) André Wicky	Ecurie Filipinetti	Lotus-BRM	53 laps	11
10	(France) Bernard Collomb	Bernard Collomb	Lotus-Climax	52 laps	15
11	(France) Jo Schlesser	Jo Schlesser	Brabham-Ford	51 laps	14
12	(Australia) Jack Brabham	Brabham Racing Organisation	Brabham-Climax	47 laps	9
Ret	(United Kingdom) Trevor Taylor	Team Lotus	Lotus-Climax	Accident	3
Ret	(Italy) Carmelo Genovese	Carmelo Genovese	Lotus-Ford	Carburettor	16
Ret	(Italy) Giacomo Russo	Giacomo Russo	Lotus-Ford	Engine	13
DNS	(Netherlands) Carel Godin de Beaufort	Ecurie Maarsbergen	Porsche	Stub-axle in practice	(12)
DNQ	(Italy) Roberto Lippi	Scuderia Setecolli	De Tomaso-Ferrari		-
DNQ	(Italy) Gaetano Starrabba	Gaetano Starrabba	Lotus-Maserati		-

Previous race: 1963 Kanonloppet	Formula One non-championship races 1963 season	Next race: 1963 Austrian Grand Prix
Previous race: 1962 Mediterranean Grand Prix	Mediterranean Grand Prix	Next race: 1964 Mediterranean Grand Prix
