= 1981 BRDC International Trophy =

1981 BRDC International Trophy Grand Prix
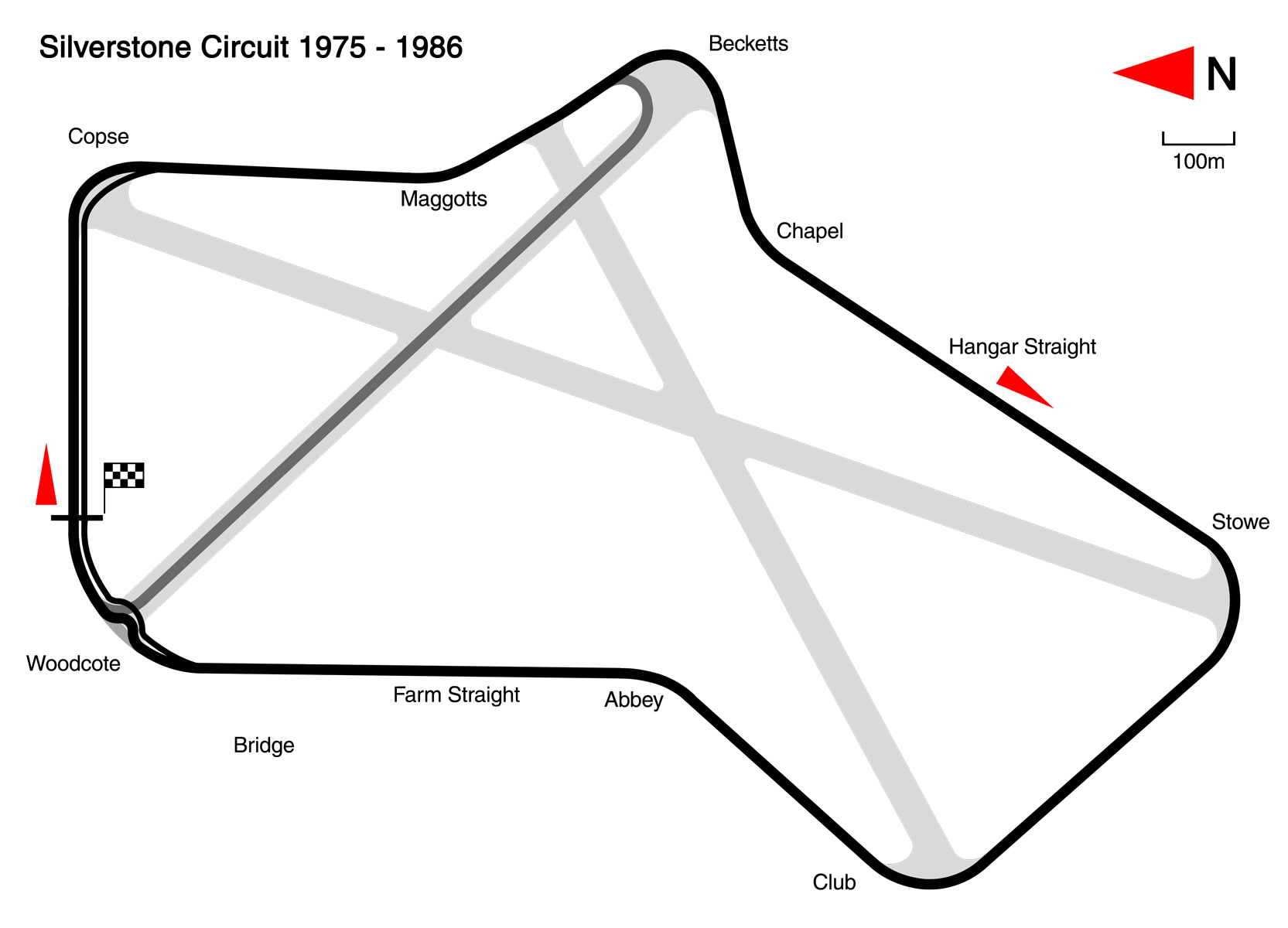

Race details
- Date: 29 March 1981
- Official name: 33rd BRDC International Trophy
- Location: Silverstone Circuit, Northamptonshire, Great Britain
- Course: Permanent racing facility
- Course length: 4.719 km (2.932 miles)
- Distance: 47 laps, 221.793 km (137.804 miles)
- Weather: Rain

Pole position
Driver	(New Zealand) Mike Thackwell	Ralt-Honda
- Time: 1:18.59

Fastest lap
Driver	(United Kingdom) Geoff Lees	Ralt-Honda
- Time: 1:22.82

Podium
First	(New Zealand) Mike Thackwell	Ralt-Honda
Second	(Italy) Riccardo Paletti	March-BMW
Third	(Italy) Corrado Fabi	March-BMW

The 33rd BRDC International Trophy was a Formula Two motor race held at Silverstone on 29 March 1981. It was the opening race of the 1981 European Formula Two Championship.

The 47-lap race was won by New Zealander Mike Thackwell, driving a works Ralt-Honda. Italian Riccardo Paletti finished second in a March-BMW entered by Onyx Race Engineering, with another Italian, Corrado Fabi, third in a works March-BMW.

== Report ==
=== Entry ===
A total of 46 F2 cars were entered for the event, however just 31 took part in qualifying.

=== Qualifying ===
Mike Thackwell took pole position for Ralt Racing Ltd, in their Ralt-Honda RH6/81, averaging a speed of 133.59 mph.

=== Race ===
The race was held over 47 laps on a wet Silverstone Grand Prix circuit. Mike Thackwell took the winner spoils for works Ralt team, driving their Ralt-Honda RH6/81. Thackwell won in a time of 1hr 11:44.67mins., averaging a speed of 115.23 mph. Over 30 seconds behind was the second place car, driven by Riccardo Paletti, in the March Onyx Racing Team’s March-BMW 812. The podium was completed by another Italian, Corrado Fabi, in his Roloil Marlboro Racing/March Racing Ltd-entered March-BMW 812, albeit one lap adrift.

== Race classification ==
Pos.	No.	Driver	Entrant	Car - Engine	Laps	Time/Retired
1st	15	(New Zealand) Mike Thackwell	Ralt Racing Ltd	Ralt-Honda RH6/81	47	1:11:44.67
2nd	7	(Italy) Riccardo Paletti	March Onyx Racing Team	March-BMW 812	47	+ 36.19
3rd	3	(Italy) Corrado Fabi	Roloil Marlboro Racing/March Racing Ltd	March-BMW 812	46	+ 1 lap
4th	77	(United Kingdom) Jim Crawford	Plygrange Racing Ltd	Toleman-Hart TG280	46	+ 1 lap
5th	12	(Italy) Carlo Rossi	Sanremo Racing Srl	Toleman-Hart TG280	46	+ 1 lap
6th	48	(United Kingdom) Brian Robinson	Grange Performance Cars	Chevron-Hart B42	46	+ 1 lap
7th	14	(United Kingdom) Geoff Lees	Ralt Racing Ltd	Ralt-Honda RH6/81	45	+ 2 laps
8th	36	(United Kingdom) Ray Mallock	Cliff Smith Racing	Ralt-Hart RT4	45	+ 2 laps
9th	1	(Sweden) Stefan Johansson	Docking Spitzley Team Toleman	Lola-Hart T850	45	+ 2 laps
10th	5	(West Germany) Christian Danner	March Racing Ltd	March-BMW 812	45	+ 2 laps
11th	10	(Italy) Michele Alboreto	Minardi Team	Minardi Fly-BMW 281	45	+ 2 laps
12th	24	(Switzerland) Jürg Lienhard	Lista Racing Team	March-BMW 802	45	+ 2 laps
13th	27	(Austria) Sewi Hopfer	Sewi Hopfer Racing	Toleman-Hart TG280	44	+ 3 laps
14th	9	(Venezuela) Johnny Cecotto	Minardi Team	Minardi Fly-BMW 281	44	+ 3 laps
15th	18	(Switzerland) Fredy Schnarwiler	Formel Rennsport Club	Lola-BMW T850	43	+ 4 laps
16th	29	(United Kingdom) Warren Booth	Colin Bennett Racing	Chevron-Hart B48	43	+ 4 laps
17th	28	(Italy) Guido Daccò	DAC Sport Racing Team	Minardi-BMW GM75	42	+ 5 laps
18th	16	(Sweden) Eje Elgh	Maurer Motorsport	Maurer-BMW MM81	42	+ 5 laps
19th	2	(United Kingdom) Kenny Acheson	Docking Spitzley Team Toleman	Lola-Hart T850	41	+ 6 laps
20th	20	(Italy) 'Gianfranco'	Astra Team Merzario Srl	March-BMW 812	39	+ 8 laps
DNF	4	(Belgium) Thierry Boutsen	Marlboro Racing for Zolder/March Racing Ltd	March-BMW 812	36	Spin/gearbox
DNF	11	(Italy) Guido Pardini	Sanremo Racing Srl	Lola-BMW T850	24	Crown wheel & pinion
DNF	31	(United Kingdom) Kim Mather	Kim Mather	March-Hart 792	24	Wheel bearing
DNF	17	(Colombia) Roberto Guerrero	Maurer Motorsport	Maurer-BMW MM81	21	Electrical
DNF	8	(France) Richard Dallest	Team AGS Motul GPA	AGS-BMW JH17	8	Accident
DNF	40	(United Kingdom) Paul Smith	BMTR	March-Hart 782	8	Engine
DNS	19	(Italy) Piero Necchi	Astra Team Merzario Srl	March-BMW 812		
DNS	35	(West Germany) Jochen Dauer	GRS Motorsport	GRS-BMW TC 001		
DNQ	21	(Italy) Arturo Merzario	Astra Team Merzario Srl	Merzario-BMW M1		
DNQ	33	(United Kingdom) Roy Baker	Roy Baker	Chevron-Hart B48		
DNQ	46	(United Kingdom) Bob Howlings	Bob Howlings	Chevron-Hart B42		

- Fastest lap: Geoff Lees, 1:22.82 secs (125.94 mph)
