= Baypark Raceway =

Motorsport track in New Zealand

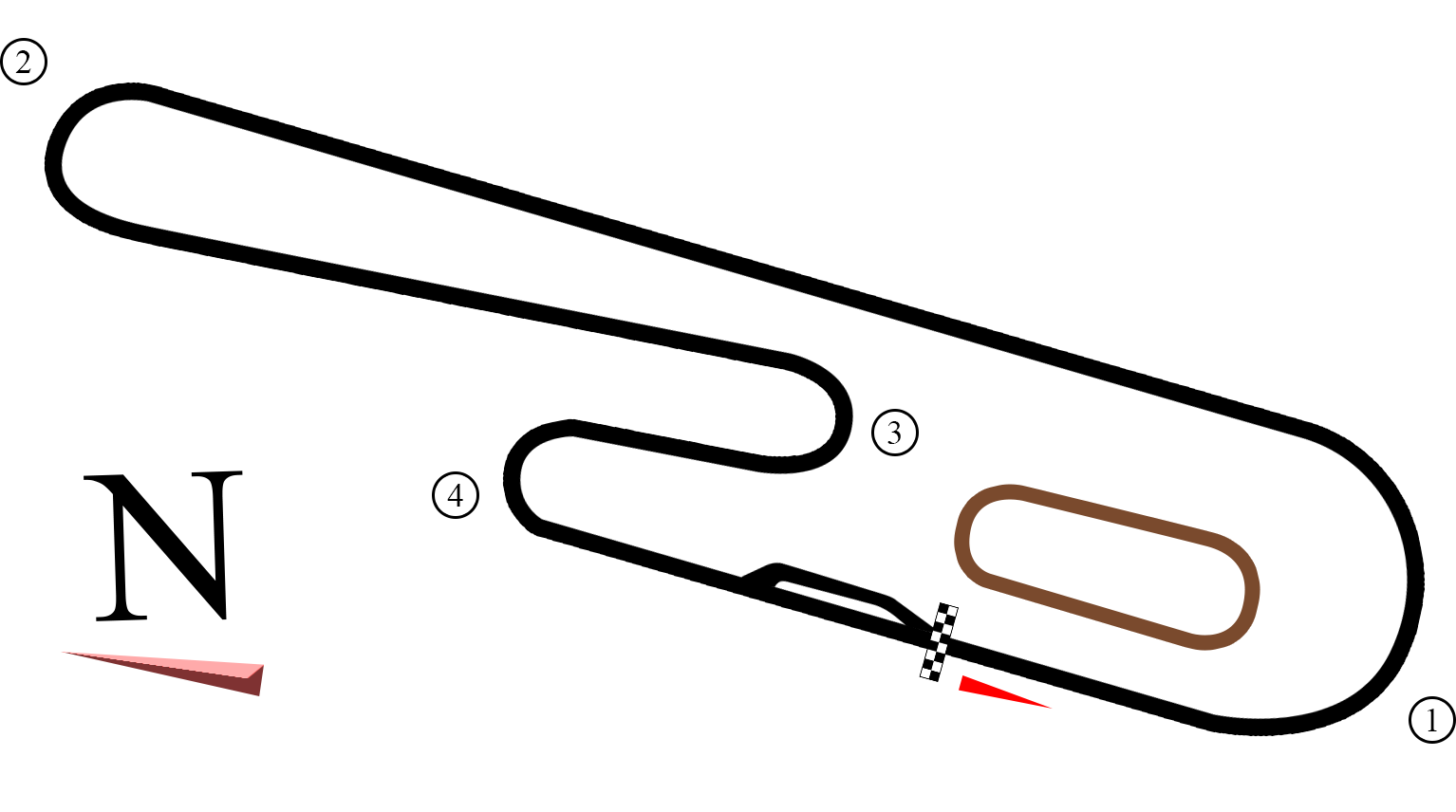
- Full Circuit (1967–1995)
- Location: Mount Maunganui, New Zealand
- Coordinates: 37°40′50″S 176°14′04″E
- Owner: Bay of Plenty Motor Racing Association
- Opened: 3 December 1967; 58 years ago
- Closed: April 1995; 31 years ago

Full Circuit (1967–1995)
- Length: 2.1348 km (1.3265 mi)
- Turns: 4

Baypark Raceway was a 2.1348 km (1.3265 mi) permanent motor racing track that was located near Mount Maunganui in the Bay of Plenty Region, New Zealand. It was opened in December 1967 and had a relatively simple layout with only four corners. There was also a dirt oval track situated within the infield of the circuit.

Generally run as an 'outsiders track', Baypark was often omitted from high-profile single-seater events such as the Tasman Series. However, it was successful in luring international sedan racing teams and drivers and helped cultivate a strong niche for the venue which it would maintain for the duration of its tenure. It was also the first circuit in New Zealand to host truck racing and Formula 5000 cars.

The circuit closed in the Easter of 1995 owing to the rising rates and surrounding suburban expansion that made the circuits operational status untenable. The area was subsequently redeveloped for housing.

== History ==
Prior to the circuit's construction, Joseph Pierce, his son Graham, and Feo Stanton organised races on a temporary street circuit in Mount Maunganui. The circuit included having to tarseal over a section of railway line in order to hold the racing which would be promptly removed after racing concluded so trains could resume operations the following day.

In late 1967, a lease was signed on a piece of swampland that bordered Maranui Street and the main Tauranga-Rotorua Highway. Also part of the lease signing were Ian Rorison and Maketu Contractors. Stanton had initially signed on to be the promoter for the venue. However, he remained only briefly and was replaced be two more temporary promoters until the role was assumed by Peter Hanna who remained in place for the duration of the circuits existence.

The Baypark circuit would host its first race weekend on December 3 in 1967. Coincidentally, on the same day of which Timaru International Motor Raceway would host its first race meeting. Baypark was initially scheduled to open on November 26 but was postponed due to inclement weather.

Baypark was generally run as an 'outsiders track' as it tended not to conform to the wishes of MotorSport New Zealand. Facilities were deemed to be substandard and the track presented little in the way of runoff, with spectators bordering the edge of the track, separated by only embankment or wooden fencing. As a result, it was often omitted from predominant series schedules such as the Tasman Series that attracted international single-seater teams and drivers. However, it did remain successful in luring international sedan entrants over the years. Drivers from the United States, United Kingdom and Australia were regular attendees to the seaside track . The category had grown popular with the local race fans and thus created a niche for the venue that would help sustain its popularity over the years. In the 1970s, a dirt oval track was built within the confines of the main racetrack. This would be used for national speedway events including sprint car and midget car racing.

=== Demise ===
With the rising rates as well as the surrounding suburbs expanding into the 1990s, the circuits operational status became untenable. The venue would close its doors in the Easter of 1995. In commemoration of the track, multiple streets in the redeveloped area have been named after drivers and personnel who made up the circuit's history including Denny Hulme, Keke Rosberg, Robbie Francevic, Paul Radisich and Neville Crichton.

In 2001, a new speedway was built across the road from the grounds of the former racetrack. It continues to host national speedway events as well as the final round of the D1NZ drifting series.

== Lap records ==
| Category | Time | Driver | Vehicle |
|---|---|---|---|
| Formula 5000 | 0.52.3 | (New Zealand) Graeme Lawrence | Lola T300 |
| Formula Pacific | 0.53.73 | (New Zealand) Ken Smith | Ralt RT4 |
| Outright Saloons | 0.56.7 | (New Zealand) Leo Leonard | Ford Mustang |
| Sports Sedans | 0.58.2 | (New Zealand) Rodger Freeth | Starlet V8 |
| Formula Ford | 1:00.7 | (New Zealand) Steve Richards | Van Diemen |
| Group A Saloons | 1:01.0 | (New Zealand) Graeme Crosby | Holden Commodore |
| Formula First | 1:08.8 | (New Zealand) Rob Lester | Orama F.V. |
| Mini Sevens | 1:11.0 | (New Zealand) Kayne Scott | Mini Seven |
| Ford Laser | 1:13.53 | (New Zealand) Murray Starnes | Ford Laser TX3 |
