= Jean-Philippe Grand =

French racing driver (born 1953)

Jean-Philippe Grand (born 25 September 1953 in Chinon) is a French former racing driver.
