= Mario Hytten =

Swiss racing driver

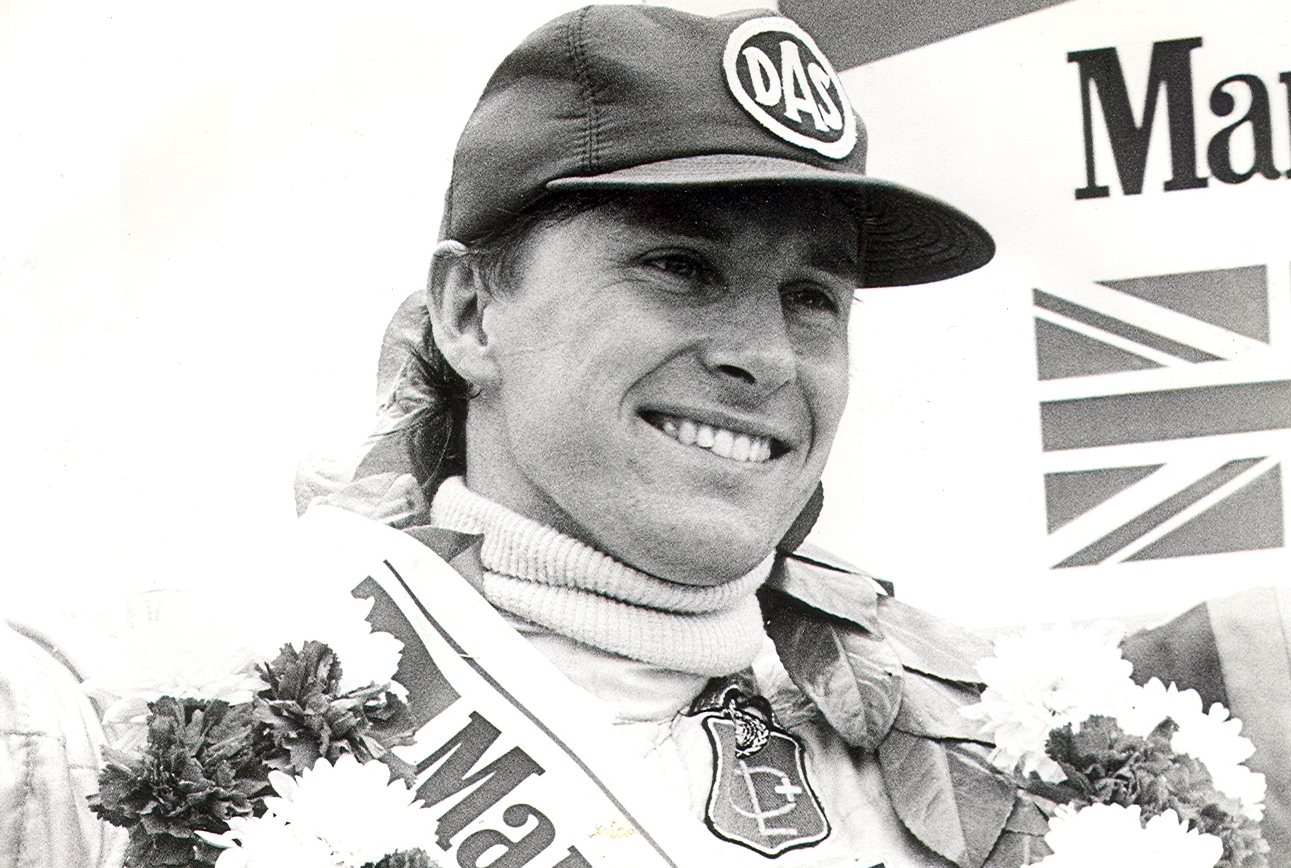
Mario Hytten (1984)

Mario Hytten (born 20 April 1955) is a Swedish-born former racing driver who raced predominantly under a Swiss licence. He competed in the 1985 24 Hours of Le Mans, finishing fifth. He now works as a sports promoter and sponsorship specialist. He is fluent in five languages.

== Racing career ==
Hytten raced predominantly in Formula 3 and Formula 3000 in a career spanning more than a decade, from 1980 to 1992. In all, he entered 75 races, won one and registered eight podium finishes. He finished fifth in the 1985 24 Hours of Le Mans driving the Porsche 956B.

== Post racing ==
Hytten retired from racing in 1993 and moved into sports media and sponsorship. He is the current CEO of Captimax Sports Media, who make camera systems for televised sporting events, and runs Planetaire AB, a sustainability communications company. He is currently working on Skyrace World Cup, a new format sailplane world championship.

== Racing record ==
=== Complete 24 Hours of Le Mans results ===
Year	Team	Co-Drivers	Car	Class	Laps	Pos.	Class Pos.
1985	(Germany) Porsche Kremer Racing	(South Africa) George Fouché (South Africa) Sarel van der Merwe	Porsche 956B	C1	361	5th	5th

=== Complete International Formula 3000 results ===
(key) (Races in bold indicate pole position; races in italics indicate fastest lap.)

Year	Entrant	Chassis	Engine	1	2	3	4	5	6	7	8	9	10	11	12	Pos.	Pts
1985	Corbari Italia	Lola T950	Cosworth	SIL; 9	THR; 10	EST; Ret	NÜR; C	VAL; Ret								10th	8
1985	Onyx	March 85B	Cosworth						PAU; Ret	SPA; Ret	DIJ; 12	PER; 5	ÖST; 10	ZAN; Ret	DON; 2	10th	8
1986	Arno International	March 85B	Cosworth	SIL; 15	VAL; Ret	PAU; DNS	SPA	IMO	MUG							NC	0
1986	Arno International	Ralt RT20	Cosworth							PER; DNQ	ÖST; Ret	BIR; DNQ	BUG	JAR; DNQ		NC	0
1987	Racetech 3000	March 87B	Cosworth	SIL	VAL	SPA	PAU; 9	DON; DNQ	PER; 13	BRH; DNQ						NC	0
1987	Racetech 3000	Ralt RT20	Cosworth								BIR; Ret	IMO; DNQ	BUG	JAR		NC	0
1988	Team Ralt	Ralt RT22	Judd	JER	VAL	PAU	SIL	MNZ	PER; 8	BRH; Ret	BIR; Ret	BUG	ZOL	DIJ		NC	0
