= Mike Thackwell =

New Zealand racing driver (born 1961)

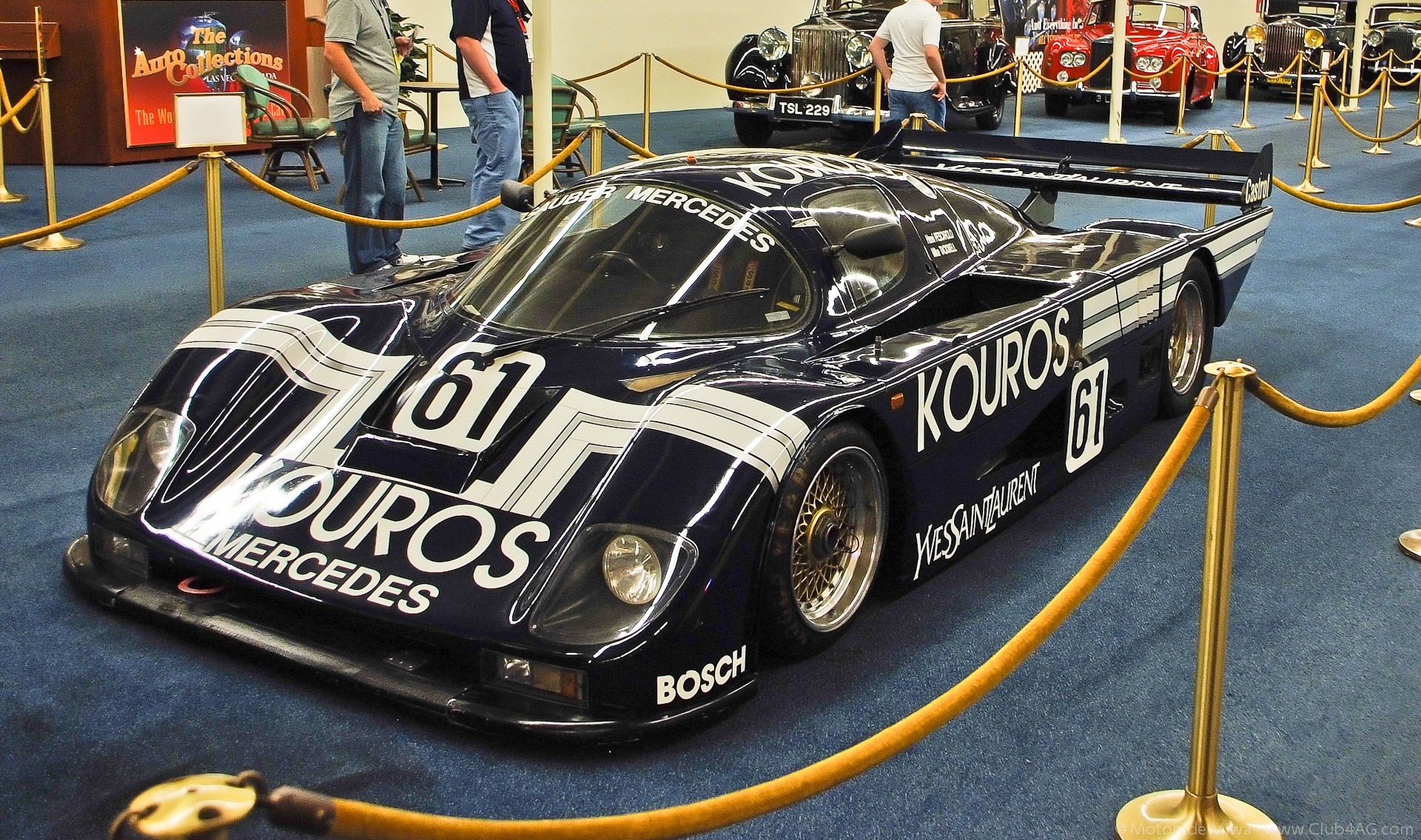
- The Sauber C8 in which Thackwell and co-driver Henri Pescarolo won the 1000km Nürburgring in 1986.
- Born: Michael Christopher Thackwell; 30 March 1961 (age 65); Papakura, Auckland, New Zealand

Formula One World Championship career
- Nationality: (New Zealand) New Zealander
- Active years: 1980, 1984
- Team(s): Arrows, Tyrrell, RAM
- Entries: 5 (2 starts)
- Championships: 0
- Wins: 0
- Podiums: 0
- Career points: 0
- Pole positions: 0
- Fastest laps: 0
- First entry: 1980 Dutch Grand Prix
- Last entry: 1984 German Grand Prix

Michael Christopher Thackwell (born 30 March 1961) is a former racing driver from New Zealand, who participated in a number of prominent racing categories, including Formula 1. The seventh youngest driver ever to qualify for a Grand Prix, he participated in five of them, making his first start on 28 September 1980 at the Canadian Grand Prix. He scored no championship points. He had previously attempted unsuccessfully to qualify for the Dutch Grand Prix which was held on 31 August 1980.

Thackwell has been described as a "teenage sensation", a "maverick" and as "something of a cult hero". Outside Formula One, he competed in Formula Three, Formula Two, Formula 3000 and sports cars, amongst other categories.

In 1984, Thackwell won the European Formula Two Championship. He was runner up in that championship in 1983, and in its successor, the International Formula 3000 Championship, in 1985. In each case, he was driving a works Ralt. Also in 1986, he won the Pau Grand Prix, again in a works Ralt. Later in the year, he combined with Henri Pescarolo to win the 1000km Nürburgring sports car race, in a Sauber C8.

== Early life ==
Thackwell was born into a motor racing family. For many years, his father, Ray, was an international speedway rider and racing driver. When Mike was six years old, his family emigrated from New Zealand to Perth, Western Australia, where he spent his formative years, and also began racing. He has four siblings; his sister Lisa is married to David Brabham and was also a racing driver, competing in the 1991 Honda CRX Challenge.

Between 1972 and 1976, Thackwell attended Christ Church Grammar School, in Claremont, a suburb of Perth. By the time of his Formula One debut in 1980, he spoke with an Australian accent, and regarded himself as Australian, but he competed, and liked to be known, as a New Zealander.

For three years from the age of nine, Thackwell competed in motocross events on motorcycles supplied by his father, an importer of high performance racing and sports cars. He then switched to karts, winning the Western Australian championship at the age of 14 at his home track at Hurricane Go Kart Club. After also winning the Hong Kong Kart Grand Prix in 1975 and 1976, he moved to England. A friend of Ray's, who built Formula Ford race cars put Mike in touch with Mike Eastick Scorpion Racing Drivers School at Thruxton in Hampshire.

== Career ==
=== Starter formulae ===
In early 1978, Thackwell began his European career, in the Dunlop Star of Tomorrow Formula Ford championship, held in the United Kingdom. He campaigned with a Van Diemen-Scholar RF78, entered by the Rushen Green team. In a closely fought, 11-round series, he won five rounds, and made the podium on two other occasions, but finished only third in the championship, with 72 points, behind Canadian entrant Robert Zurrer (77 points) and British driver Terry Gray (76 points).

The following year, 1979, Thackwell moved up to the Vandervell British Formula 3 Championship, at the wheel of a March-Toyota 793, entered by the March works team. In a 19-race series, he managed five more wins and four other podium finishes, along with a pole position and a fastest lap. Once again, he finished the championship in third place, this time with 71 points, behind Chico Serra (103 points) and Andrea de Cesaris (90 points), but ahead of Stefan Johansson (fourth), Nigel Mansell (eighth), Alain Prost (equal 12th) and Thierry Boutsen (19th), all four of whom were later to have lengthy, and in most cases race-winning, Formula One careers.

Also in 1979, March entered Thackwell and the March 793 in two races of the FIA European Formula Three Championship. He achieved a win and a fastest lap, at Monza in the Gran Premio della Lotteria. In a championship won by Alain Prost, he also finished equal eighth overall, ahead of Boutsen (nine races), Arie Luyendyk (11 races), Serra (one race) and Philippe Streiff (five races) (equal thirteenth), and Jo Gartner (3 races; 21st). Thackwell and the March 793 also managed pole position and fastest lap in the non-championship RAC FOCA Trophy race at Donington Park, but finished only ninth.

For 1980, Thackwell decided to follow Serra and de Cesaris into Formula Two. However, before that he returned to New Zealand to race a Marlboro-backed works March 792 in Aurora AFX New Zealand International Formula Pacific series, alongside de Cesaris. The cars, modified F2 cars, were overweight and under performed.

Thackwell's return to Europe saw him again driving a March. As early as round two at Hockenheim he was on the pace, setting fastest lap, a feat he would repeat in the following round on the 14.272 mile Nürburgring Nordschleife. However, it was at Zandvoort that he marked himself as a genuine talent.

=== Formula One debut ===
In 1980, having tested for both Ensign and Tyrrell, Thackwell had been signed by Ken Tyrrell to be a test driver for the Tyrrell F1 team, alongside his F2 campaign. He was invited to the Dutch Grand Prix by Tyrrell as a spectator, both to learn about the track and the Tyrrell 010 when Arrows team boss Jackie Oliver approached him after the first unofficial practice session to ask if he'd like to drive the Arrows A3. Oliver's regular driver, Jochen Mass had been injured at the previous grand prix, but his car was at Zandvoort. Although the car was still set up for Mass, including his seat and pedal arrangement, Thackwell got permission to drive the car from Tyrrell and though he failed to qualify, eventually set a faster time than Keke Rosberg in the Fittipaldi.

Thackwell made his official debut a few weeks later, when Tyrrell made the third car available for him at the Canadian Grand Prix, becoming the youngest driver to start a Formula One race. On the first lap of the race, Alan Jones and Nelson Piquet collided at the first turn and were subsequently hit by a number of other cars, including Jean-Pierre Jarier and Derek Daly, both driving Tyrrells. Thackwell negotiated his way through the carnage and returned to the start/finish line undamaged by which time, the race had been red flagged. As both Jarier's and Daly's cars were too badly damaged to repair quickly, Thackwell was instructed by Ken Tyrrell to give up his car for Jarier. While Thackwell actually never completed a lap and was not part of the second start, Formula One credits him with a race start. Therefore, he surpassed Ricardo Rodríguez as the youngest race starter, a feat that remained until Jaime Alguersuari broke the record at the 2009 Hungarian Grand Prix; a record that was subsequently broken by Max Verstappen in 2015.

Thackwell had another opportunity at the next race with Tyrrell, the United States Grand Prix. After he suffered a fractured brake disc during qualifying, he was unable to qualify to race at Watkins Glen.

=== Between Formula One ===
Thackwell's debut in a Tyrrell was unsuccessful; he returned to Formula Two in 1981. He was still considered to be one of stars of the future and was signed by Ralt to partner Geoff Lees. After winning the International Trophy at Silverstone, and a third place at Hockenheim, he suffered a massive testing accident driving the works Ralt-Honda at Thruxton that left him with a shattered heel and head injuries. According to Autosport he hit a bank head on and stopped from 140 mph to 0 mph in under 2 feet. Within weeks, although still on crutches, he completed the rest of the season and finished 6th in the Championship.

Unable to secure any works drive in 1982 owing to belief of team owners that he had still not recovered from his accident the previous year. With finance from family, friends and small sponsors, he managed to obtain a drive for the 1982 season in the small under-financed and privately run Horag Racing and Bertram Schäfer Racing Teams; he still managed two top three results at Pau and Spa-Francorchamps.

Thackwell rejoined the works Ralt team for 1983, coming second in that year's F2 championship to Jonathan Palmer, after a win at Jarama with another eight visits to the podium. The following season he remained at Ralt, and despite having Roberto Moreno as teammate Thackwell went one better, dominating the championship, taking the title on the back of seven victories out of eleven races, including another success in the International Trophy race at Silverstone. By the end of the season, he had taken another six pole positions and nine fastest laps. He led a total of 408 of the 580 laps.

=== Return to Formula One ===
Suddenly in the middle of his season of dominance, Thackwell was back in demand again. However, this only amounted to two more fill-in one-off drives, the last of his career in F1.

For the Canadian Grand Prix, Thackwell replaced Palmer at the RAM team. He duly qualified in 25th place, one place higher than teammate Philippe Alliot, faster by 1.556 seconds. His race lasted until lap 30, when a broken turbo wastegate forced him into retirement. Palmer would reclaim his seat for the next race. Tyrrell wanted him to race in Germany, as Stefan Bellof was unavailable. Once again Thackwell failed to qualify for the German Grand Prix by just 0.055secs. He also tested for Williams during the season.

=== After Formula One ===
The opportunity to sample other racing categories arose. Thackwell drove in two World Endurance Championship races, coming 21st at the Nürburgring 1000km for Obermaier Racing in their Porsche 956 and finishing fifth in the 956 of Kremer Racing at the Fuji 1000km. Thackwell finished the 1984 season in CART for Penske Racing, in their Pennzoil March 84C, after foot injuries at Sanair during practice for the Molson 300 sidelined Penske ace Rick Mears. While not scoring any points in his two races, unlike Johnny Rutherford, who raced the first two races of Mears' eventual year and a half recovery as a substitute, the No. 6 team finished third overall in the 1984 season.

Unable to get a decent drive in F1 and CART, Thackwell turned his back on them and raced in the F2 replacement series, the Formula 3000. He won the first round at Silverstone and in the process, won his third International Trophy race. He added two victories before finishing runner-up to Christian Danner. Meanwhile, he also raced four times for the TWR Jaguar team, rounding his season off with a second place at the Shah Alam circuit, partnered by John Nielsen.

In 1986, Thackwell continued to win in F3000, both in Europe and Japan, and scored Mercedes-Benz's first modern racing success when he shared a Sauber with Henri Pescarolo to win the Nürburgring 1000km.

During the European winter of 1987, Thackwell returned to New Zealand to race in Formula Pacific. He won the first three rounds of the MANZ Formula Pacific International Championship, going on to take the title.

Thackwell concentrated on sports car racing with the Kouros Racing Team in their Sauber C9 in 1987, putting the car on pole position at Spa only to receive yet more disappointment during the race when his seat mountings broke when leading the race. His only podium finish in the World Endurance series came after he quit and took a drive with Britten Lloyd Racing in their Porsche 962GTi, this time partnering Mauro Baldi.

In 1988, Thackwell had a one-off F3000 drive for the works Ralt outfit at Pau. However, having become disillusioned with motorsport, he turned his back on it at the end of 1988.

In the years following his withdrawal from motorsport, Thackwell worked, among other occupations, as a helicopter pilot in the North Sea for British International Helicopters, a gold miner in the North-West of Western Australia and as a teacher in England. He is widely felt to have been one of the great 'lost talents' – a driver in the wrong place at the wrong time. According to the English magazine Motorsport Thackwell now lives on the South Coast of England, where he spends his free time surfing summer and winter when waves allow.

As of 2020, Thackwell lives in a small caravan (still on the South Coast), having voluntarily given up most of his material possessions; he spends most of his time taking care of his mentally handicapped son, and makes minimum wage.

== Racing record ==
=== Career highlights ===
Season	Series	Position	Car	Team
1978	Dunlop Star of Tomorrow Championship	**3rd**	Van Diemen-Scholar RF78	Rushen Green Racing
1979	Vandervell British Formula 3 Championship	**3rd**	March-Toyota 793	March Racing Ltd.
1979	FIA European Formula 3 Championship	8th	March-Toyota 793	March Racing Ltd.
1980	European Formula Two Championship	8th	March-BMW 802	ICI Racing Team
1980	Japanese Formula Two Championship	8th	March-BMW 802	Walter Wolf Racing Japan
1980	New Zealand Formula Pacific Championship	15th	March-Ford 792	March Cars – Marlboro
1980	World Championship of Drivers	NC	Arrows-Cosworth A3	Warsteiner Arrows Racing Team
1980	World Championship of Drivers	NC	Tyrrell-Cosworth 010	Candy Tyrrell Team
1981	European Formula Two Championship	6th	Ralt-Honda RH6/81	Ralt Racing Team
1981	Japanese Formula Two Championship	16th	March-Honda 812	KK Super Sport
1981	Japanese Formula Two Championship	16th	Ralt-Honda RH6/81	Ralt Racing Team
1982	European Formula Two Championship	11th	March-BMW 822	Horag Racing Team
1982	European Formula Two Championship	11th	Maurer-BMW M82	Bertram Schäfer Racing
1982	Japanese Formula Two Championship	17th	Toleman-Hart TG280	Nova Engineering
1982	Japanese Formula Two Championship	17th	March-BMW 822	Tomei Jidousya
1983	European Formula Two Championship	**2nd**	Ralt-Honda RH6/83H	Ralt Racing Ltd
1983	Japanese Formula Two Championship	16th	Ralt-Honda RH6/83H	Ralt Racing Team
1984	**European Formula Two Championship**	**1st**	**Ralt-Honda RH6**	**Ralt Racing Ltd**
1984	Japanese Formula Two Championship	16th	Ralt-Honda RH6	Ralt Racing Team
1984	All Japan Sports-Prototype Championship	28th	Porsche 956	Porsche Kremer Racing
1984	FIA World Endurance Championship	50th	Porsche 956	Obermaier Racing
1984	FIA World Endurance Championship	50th	Porsche 956	Porsche Kremer Racing
1984	European Touring Car Championship		BMW 635CSi	CC Motorsport
1984	World Championship of Drivers	NC	RAM-Hart 02	Skoal Bandit Formula 1 Team
1984	World Championship of Drivers	NC	Tyrrell-Cosworth 012	Tyrrell Racing Organisation
1984	PPG Indy Car World Series	NC	March-Cosworth 84C	Penske Racing
1985	International Formula 3000 Championship	**2nd**	Ralt-Cosworth RT20	Ralt Racing Ltd
1985	FIA World Endurance Championship	11th	Porsche 956	Obermaier Racing
1985	FIA World Endurance Championship	11th	Porsche 962C	Porsche Kremer Racing
1985	FIA World Endurance Championship	11th	Jaguar XJR-6	TWR Jaguar
1986	Japanese Formula Two Championship	5th	March-Mugen Honda 85J	Marlboro Team Nova
1986	Japanese Formula Two Championship	5th	March-Mugen Honda 86J	Marlboro Team Nova
1986	International Formula 3000 Championship	8th	Lola-Cosworth T86/50	Horag Racing/Formula Team Ltd.
1986	International Formula 3000 Championship	8th	Ralt-Honda RT20	Ralt Racing Ltd.
1986	FIA World Sports-Prototype Championship	15th	Sauber-Mercedes-Benz C8	Kouros Racing
1986	European Touring Car Championship		Ford Sierra XR4Ti	Ford Motorsport Eggenberger
1987	**Mita Copies NZ International Formula Pacific Championship**	**1st**	**Ralt-Ford RT4**	**Ralt Australia**
1987	All Japan Sports Prototype Car Endurance Championship	8th	Porsche 962C	From A Racing
1987	FIA World Sportscar Championship	29th	Sauber-Mercedes-Benz C9	Kouros Mercedes
1987	FIA World Sportscar Championship	29th	Porsche 962C	Britten-Lloyd Racing
1987	ADAC Würth Supercup		Sauber-Mercedes-Benz C9	Formel Rennsportclub
1988	International Formula 3000 Championship	NC	Ralt-Judd RT22	Ralt Racing Ltd.

=== Complete European Formula Two Championship results ===
(key) (Races in bold indicate pole position; races in italics indicate fastest lap)

Year	Entrant	Chassis	Engine	1	2	3	4	5	6	7	8	9	10	11	12	13	Pos.	Pts
1980	ICI Racing Team	March 802	BMW	THR; Ret	HOC; Ret	NÜR; 10	VLL; 4	PAU; 4	SIL; 3	ZOL; 6	MUG; 19	ZAN; Ret	PER; 9	MIS; Ret	HOC		8th	11
1981	Ralt Racing	Ralt RH6/81	Honda	**SIL**; 1	HOC; 3	THR	NÜR	VLL	MUG; 5	PAU; 6	PER; DSQ	SPA; Ret	DON; 5	MIS; 3	MAN; 15		6th	22
1982	Horag Hotz Racing	March 822	BMW	SIL; Ret			NÜR; Ret	MUG; 8	VLL; 9	PAU; 3	SPA; 3	HOC; 10	DON; Ret	MAN	PER	MIS	10th	8
1982	Bertram Schäfer Racing	Maurer MM82	BMW		HOC; Ret	THR											10th	8
1983	Ralt Racing	Ralt RH6/83	Honda	SIL; 2	**THR**; 2	HOC; 3	NÜR; 7	VLL; 3	PAU; 8	JAR; 1	DON; 2	MIS; Ret	**PER**; 3	ZOL; 2	MUG; 2		**2nd**	**51**
1984	Ralt Racing	Ralt RH6/84	Honda	SIL; 1	HOC; 2	**THR**; 1	**VLL**; 1	MUG; 1	**PAU**; 1	**HOC**; 9	MIS; 1	**PER**; 1	**DON**; 4	BRH; Ret			**1st**	**72**

=== Complete International Formula 3000 results ===
(key) (Races in bold indicate pole position; races in italics indicate fastest lap.)

Year	Entrant	Chassis	Engine	1	2	3	4	5	6	7	8	9	10	11	12	Pos.	Pts
1985	Ralt Racing Ltd	Ralt RB20	Cosworth	SIL; 1	**THR**; 2	**EST**; NC	**NÜR**; C	**VLL**; Ret	PAU; Ret	**SPA**; 1	DIJ; 2	**PER**; 1	ÖST; 9	ZAN; 2	**DON**; Ret	**2nd**	**45**
1986	Horag Hotz Racing	Lola T86/50	Cosworth	SIL; 4	VLL					PER; 9	ÖST	BIR	BUG			8th	10.5
1986	Ralt Racing Ltd	Ralt RT20	Honda			PAU; 1	SPA	IMO	MUG					JAR; Ret		8th	10.5
1988	Team Ralt	Ralt RT22	Judd	JER	VLL	PAU; 7	SIL	MNZ	PER	BRH	BIR	BUG	ZOL	DIJ		NC	0

=== Complete Formula One results ===
(key)

Year	Entrant	Chassis	Engine	1	2	3	4	5	6	7	8	9	10	11	12	13	14	15	16	WDC	Pts
1980	Warsteiner Arrows Racing Team	Arrows A3	Ford Cosworth DFV 3.0 V8	ARG	BRA	RSA	USW	BEL	MON	FRA	GBR	GER	AUT	NED; DNQ	ITA					NC	0
1980	Candy Tyrrell Team	Tyrrell 010	Ford Cosworth DFV 3.0 V8													CAN; Ret	USA; DNQ			NC	0
1984	Skoal Bandit F1 Team	RAM 02	Hart 415T 1.5 L4t	BRA	RSA	BEL	SMR	FRA	MON	CAN; Ret	DET	DAL	GBR							NC	0
1984	Tyrrell Racing Organisation	Tyrrell 012	Ford Cosworth DFY 3.0 V8											GER; DNQ	AUT	NED	ITA	EUR	POR	NC	0

=== American Open-Wheel racing ===
(key) (Races in bold indicate pole position)

==== CART PPG Indy Car World Series ====
Year	Team	No.	Chassis	Engine	1	2	3	4	5	6	7	8	9	10	11	12	13	14	15	16	Pos.	Pts
1984	Team Penske	6	March 84C	Cosworth DFX V8t	LBH	PHX	INDY	MIL	POR	MEA	CLE	MCH	ROA	POC	MDO	SAN	MCH	PHX	LAG; 18	CPL; 20	NC	0

=== 24 Hours of Le Mans results ===
Year	Team	Co-Drivers	Car	Class	Laps	Pos.	Class Pos.
1985	(Germany) Kremer Porsche Racing	(France) Jean-Pierre Jarier (Austria) Franz Konrad	Porsche 962C	C1	356	9th	9th
1986	(Switzerland) Kouros Racing Team	(Denmark) John Nielsen	Sauber-Mercedes-Benz C8	C1	61	DNF	DNF
1987	(Switzerland) Kouros Racing	(France) Henri Pescarolo (Japan) Hideki Okada	Sauber-Mercedes-Benz C9	C1	123	DNF	DNF
1987	(Switzerland) Kouros Racing	(United Kingdom) Johnny Dumfries (United States) Chip Ganassi	Sauber-Mercedes-Benz C9	C1	37	DNF	DNF

Sporting positions
Preceded by Jonathan Palmer	European Formula Two; Champion; 1984	Succeeded by Christian Danner (International Formula 3000)
Records
Preceded by Ricardo Rodríguez; 19 years, 208 days (1961 Italian GP)	Youngest driver to start a Formula One race 19 years, 182 days (1980 Canadian Grand Prix)	Succeeded by Jaime Alguersuari; 19 years, 125 days (2009 Hungarian GP)
