= Coloni C3 =

Formula One racing car

Coloni C3 Coloni C3B Coloni C3C
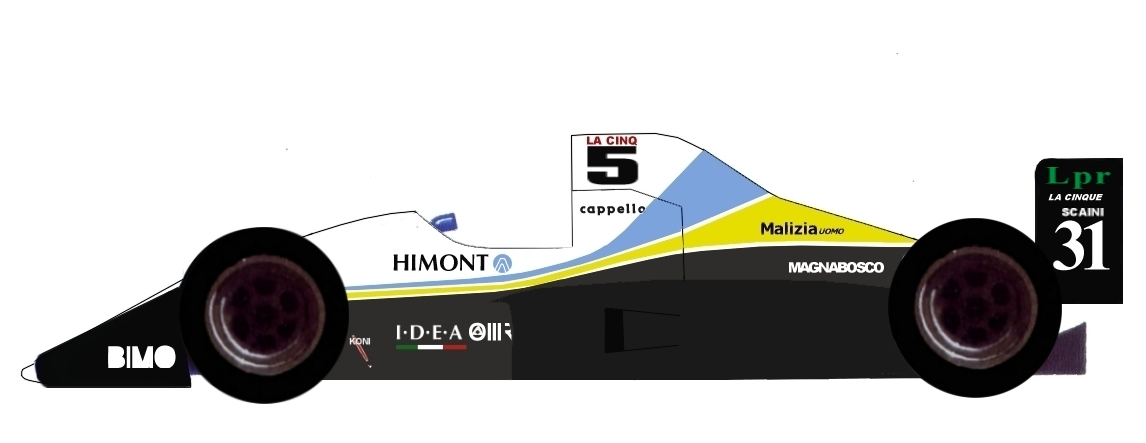
- Category: Formula One
- Constructor: Coloni
- Designers: Christian Vanderpleyn; Gary Anderson
- Predecessor: Coloni FC188B
- Successor: Coloni C4

Technical specifications
- Chassis: carbon fibre/kevlar monocoque
- Suspension (front): KONI dampers
- Suspension (rear): KONI dampers
- Axle track: 1,810 mm (71.3 in)/1,600 mm (63.0 in) front/rear (C3); 1,810 mm (71.3 in)/1,670 mm (65.7 in) front/rear (C3C)
- Wheelbase: 2,800 mm (110.2 in) (C3); 2,850 mm (112.2 in) (C3C)
- Engine: Cosworth DFR 3,494 cc (213.2 cu in) V8 (C3 and C3C); Subaru 1235 3,500 cc (213.6 cu in) B12 (C3B)
- Transmission: Coloni 6-speed (C3 and C3C); Minardi 6-speed (C3B)
- Fuel: Agip
- Tyres: Pirelli; Goodyear

Competition history
- Notable entrants: Coloni Racing Srl; Subaru Coloni Racing
- Notable drivers: 31. (Brazil) Roberto Moreno; 31. (Belgium) Bertrand Gachot; 32. (France) Pierre-Henri Raphanel; 32. (Italy) Enrico Bertaggia
- Debut: 1989 Canadian Grand Prix
Entries	Races	Wins	Poles	F/Laps
27	3	0	0	0

The Coloni C3 (also known as the Coloni FC189) was a Formula One racing car designed by Christian Vanderpleyn for the 1989 Formula One season. Built to replace the Coloni FC188 used in the previous season, the C3 used a 3.5-litre Cosworth DFR V8 engine.

Although not ready for the start of the 1989 season, the C3 made its début at the 1989 Canadian Grand Prix in the hands of Roberto Moreno and Pierre-Henri Raphanel. The C3 was not successful and frequently failed to pre-qualify for races during 1989. It was updated to the C3B for the 1990 season, with the Cosworth DFR being replaced by a Subaru 1235 flat-12 engine; however, this engine was large, heavy and underpowered. Bertrand Gachot, Coloni's only driver for 1990, failed to pre-qualify in any of the eight races that he drove the C3B. Following a fallout between Enzo Coloni and Subaru, the C3C was developed, once again using the Cosworth DFR; although Gachot was usually able to pre-qualify this version, he never managed to qualify for a race. In 1991, the C3C was evolved into the C4, but results did not improve and Coloni folded at the end of that season.

== Design and development ==
Christian Vanderpleyn designed the Coloni C3 as a replacement for the Coloni FC188 in 1989. One notable difference from the FC188 was the presence of an airbox in place of the older car's rollbar. The C3 used a 3.5-litre Cosworth DFR V8 engine. However, the car arrived late, and was quite underdeveloped; in particular, it was lacking in straight line speed, which was most noticeable at Monza and Spa-Francorchamps. After Vanderpleyn quit the team, freelancer Gary Anderson was tasked with extracting some more performance from the C3; he developed a new nosecone and front wing, and this helped the team to its best ever qualifying position at the Portuguese Grand Prix. Even with the new configuration, however, the car still lacked straight line speed, and results did not noticeably improve after Portugal.

Following the poor 1989 season, Enzo Coloni struck a deal with Subaru prior to the 1990 season to become the Japanese manufacturer's works team. This deal, where Subaru bought half of the Coloni team, meant that the Cosworth DFR was replaced by Subaru's 1235 flat-12 engine. This engine, which was of Subaru's typical boxer format, was developed by Motori Moderni, and had originally been intended for Minardi. However, the engine was not a noticeable improvement over the DFR; it only produced a modest 417 kW (559 hp; 567 PS), with Motori Moderni targeting a power output of 447 kW (599 hp; 608 PS), and it was also overweight, weighing 159 kg (351 lb). Although this was only 10 kg (22 lb) heavier than the old DFR, the complete engine assembly was actually 112 kg (247 lb). To make matters worse, it would also prove to be unreliable, and prone to failure. The engine was designed to use a Minardi gearbox. The C3 was updated to the C3B specification in order to accommodate the new engine, and was actually quite a major change; for example, the airbox was removed, and replaced by two sidepod-mounted air ducts, which led to the sidepods being taller and longer. The weight of the Subaru engine also caused the C3B to have somewhat unpredictable handling, as the weight balance was quite heavily centred towards the rear of the car.

After just eight races, Subaru and Coloni's relationship broke down; following some political wrangling between the two companies, Subaru pulled out altogether. Coloni thus reverted to using the Cosworth DFR engine prepared by Langford & Peck in an updated version of the C3, known as the C3C; this chassis had been designed with the Subaru engine in mind, but was much closer to the original C3 than the C3B, with its airbox and low sidepods. The C3C was a noticeable improvement over the C3B, and, although still unpredictable, it did lead to a modest improvement in the team's fortunes. For the Belgian Grand Prix, an updated engine cover was brought, but it failed to make a major difference to the C3C. For 1991, the C3C was updated into the C4.

== Racing history ==
The C3 took a while to be developed, and this led to an updated version of the FC188, the FC188B, being used until the 1989 Canadian Grand Prix. It would prove to be a mixed début for the car; Pierre-Henri Raphanel finished dead last in pre-qualifying, but not only did Roberto Moreno manage to qualify the car, he managed to complete 57 laps before succumbing to gearbox trouble. However, neither driver managed to qualify for the following race, which was the 1989 French Grand Prix. Moreno did manage to qualify for the 1989 British Grand Prix, but only lasted two laps before suffering another gearbox failure. It was not until the 1989 Portuguese Grand Prix that Coloni managed to qualify again; by then, Raphanel had been replaced by Enrico Bertaggia, whilst Moreno qualified 15th in what would prove to be Coloni's best qualifying session ever. However, after Arrows' Eddie Cheever wiped out the C3 on Saturday, the updated front wing was destroyed, and Moreno struggled until electrical gremlins forced him to retire on lap 11. This would be the last time a Coloni made it onto the grid in 1989.

For 1990, the new-look Subaru Coloni team slimmed down to a single-car effort, driven by Bertrand Gachot. Things started inauspiciously for the team, when Gachot pre-qualified dead-last for the 1990 United States Grand Prix. In fact, Gachot failed to pre-qualify in each and every race that he drove the Subaru-powered C3B, and also the 1990 German Grand Prix and 1990 Hungarian Grand Prix in the new Cosworth-powered C3C. By the 1990 Belgian Grand Prix, however, things had improved marginally; Gachot pre-qualified a Coloni for the first time in a year, but was still 30th and last in qualifying proper. From then onwards, Gachot would regularly pre-qualify his C3C, but never once managed to get through qualifying proper, and Coloni finished the season without ever actually competing in a race.

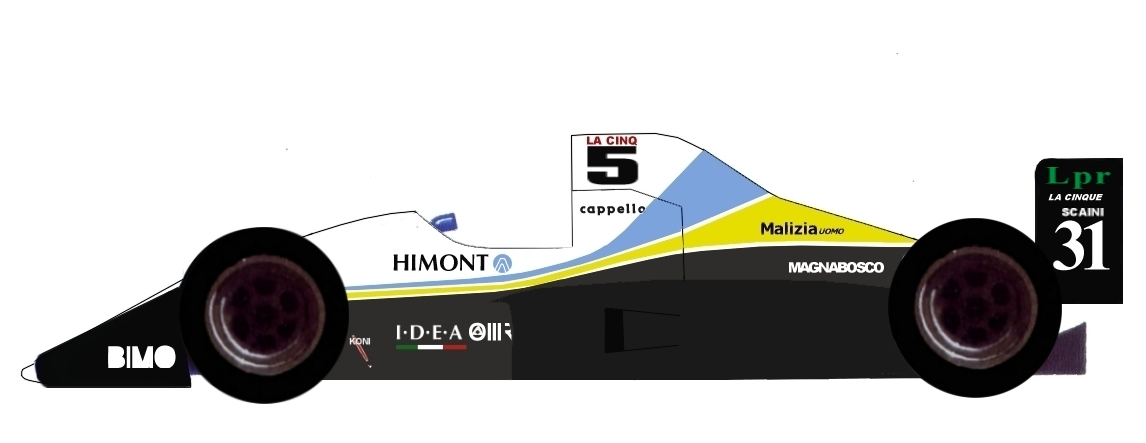
1989 Coloni C3

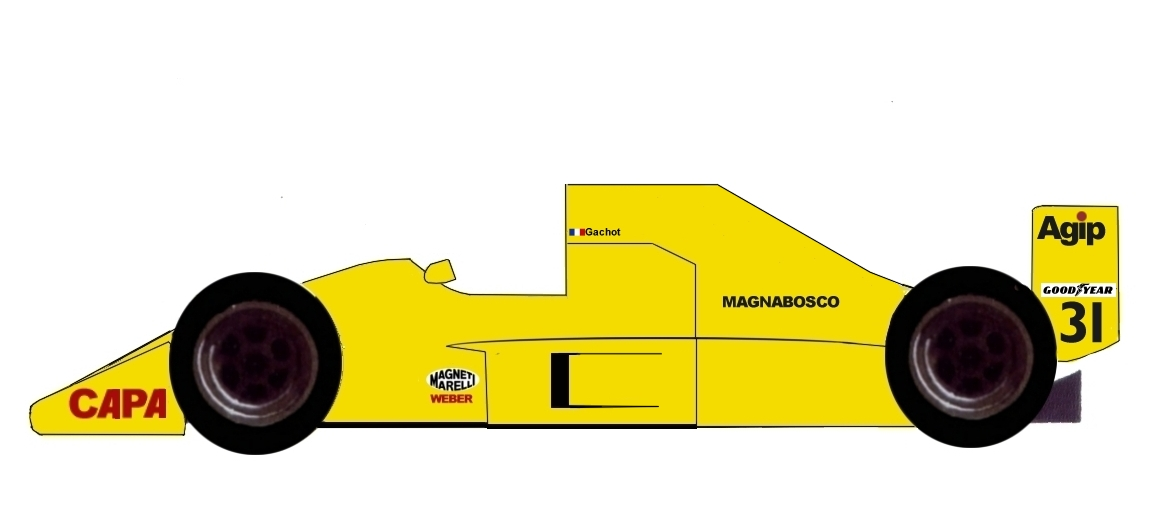
1990 Coloni C3C

== Complete Formula One results ==
(key) (results shown in bold indicate pole position; results in italics indicate fastest lap)

Year	Chassis	Engine	Tyres	Driver	1	2	3	4	5	6	7	8	9	10	11	12	13	14	15	16	Pts.	WCC
1989	Coloni C3	Ford DFR V8	P		BRA	SMR	MON	MEX	USA	CAN	FRA	GBR	GER	HUN	BEL	ITA	POR	ESP	JPN	AUS	0	NC
1989	Coloni C3	Ford DFR V8	P	Roberto Moreno						Ret	DNQ	Ret	DNPQ	DNPQ	DNPQ	DNPQ	Ret	DNPQ	DNPQ	DNPQ	0	NC
1989	Coloni C3	Ford DFR V8	P	Pierre-Henri Raphanel						DNPQ	DNPQ	DNPQ	DNPQ	DNPQ							0	NC
1989	Coloni C3	Ford DFR V8	P	Enrico Bertaggia											DNPQ	DNPQ	DNPQ	DNPQ	DNPQ	DNPQ	0	NC
1990	Coloni C3B	Subaru 1235 F12	G		USA	BRA	SMR	MON	CAN	MEX	FRA	GBR	GER	HUN	BEL	ITA	POR	ESP	JPN	AUS	0	NC
1990	Coloni C3B	Subaru 1235 F12	G	Bertrand Gachot	DNPQ	DNPQ	DNPQ	DNPQ	DNPQ	DNPQ	DNPQ	DNPQ									0	NC
1990	Coloni C3C	Ford DFR V8	G	Bertrand Gachot									DNPQ	DNPQ	DNQ	DNQ	DNQ	DNQ	DNQ	DNQ	0	NC
