= Subaru 1235 =

Overview
- Manufacturer: (Japan) / (Italy) Subaru/Motori Moderni
- Production: 1989–1990

Layout
- Configuration: Flat-12
- Displacement: 3,498 cc (213.5 cu in)
- Cylinder bore: 84 mm (3.3 in)
- Piston stroke: 52.6 mm (2.1 in)
- Valvetrain: 60-valve, DOHC, 5 valves per cylinder

Combustion
- Management: Magneti Marelli
- Fuel type: Gasoline

Output
- Power output: 317–417.5 kW (425–560 hp; 431–568 PS)
- Torque output: 220–245 lb⋅ft (298–332 N⋅m)

Dimensions
- Dry weight: 159 kg (351 lb)

The Subaru 1235 was a motor racing engine designed and built by Motori Moderni, and funded by Subaru for the Japanese manufacturer’s Formula One program in 1990. A 3.5-litre boxer-12, it was used by the Coloni team for the first eight races, but proved to be very unsuccessful and the team reverted to using the old Cosworth DFR V8 engine. Alba also used it in the World Sportscar Championship in 1990, but were similarly unsuccessful and switched to a 4.5-litre Buick V6 midway through the season.

== History ==
After seeing fellow Japanese manufacturers Yamaha and Honda enter Formula One as engine suppliers, Subaru decided to follow suit in 1989. They contracted the Italian firm Motori Moderni to build the engine for them; Motori Moderni had previously built a turbocharged V6 engine during the turbo era in the mid 1980s. This engine had been primarily used by the Minardi team from 1985 to 1987, although AGS briefly used it in 1986, but never saw any real success. For Subaru, Motori Moderni came up with a 3.5-litre, 60-valve flat-twelve engine in the boxer configuration that the Japanese firm's road cars utilised. Although the flat-twelve design had proven successful for Ferrari in the mid-to-late-1970s in their multiple championship-winning 312T series of cars, it had fallen out of favour from 1980 onwards due to the advent of the ground effects cars, which the wide flat engine configuration did not suit.

Despite this, Motori Moderni's owner Carlo Chiti felt that the flat engine configuration would provide some aerodynamic benefits due to its inherent low centre of gravity. The engine, which was named the Subaru 1235, first appeared in a Minardi test car at the Misano track in May 1989, and dyno tests indicated that it had a maximum power output of 417 kW (559 hp; 567 PS). This was significantly less than its rivals; even the Cosworth DFR V8 engine produced at least 590 hp (440 kW; 598 PS), whilst the dominant engine of the 1989 season, which was Honda's RA109E V10, produced at least 660 hp (492 kW; 669 PS). Although Chiti was targeting a final power output of 447 kW (599 hp; 608 PS), which would've made the new engine competitive with the DFR, the Subaru 1235 had another Achilles heel; its weight. Although the basic engine itself weighed 159 kg (351 lb), which was only 10 kg (22 lb) or so heavier than the Cosworth DFR, the weight of its ancillaries meant that it was actually 112 kg (247 lb) heavier than a complete DFR unit. The engine primarily used Magneti Marelli electronics, and a Minardi-developed gearbox.

Although Subaru intended to provide the Minardi team with the engine, they instead opted to partner Minardi's Italian rivals, Coloni, for the 1990 season, even purchasing half of the team. The Coloni C3, which had been used the previous season, was extensively modified into the "C3B" specification to be suitable for use with the Subaru 1235, and Bertrand Gachot was hired to drive it. The engine made its début at the 1990 United States Grand Prix, but it was not a happy one; Gachot finished dead-last in pre-qualifying, having been unable to even complete a single lap before a gear-linkage failure. Things would not improve for the Coloni team, as the Subaru engine proved to be fragile as well as underpowered, and its bulk also meant that the C3B's handling was unpredictable. Following a falling-out between Coloni, his team and Subaru, the Japanese firm opted to end their involvement after the 1990 British Grand Prix, just eight races after the engine had made its début, and without the C3B pre-qualifying once. The Coloni team promptly reverted to the Cosworth DFR in their updated C3C model, but, although they were often able to pre-qualify with this package, they never qualified for a race again and folded at the end of the 1991 season.

The Subaru 1235 engines, however, were not only used in Formula One. They were also used in the World Sportscar Championship by Alba, in their Group C AR20 car, during the 1990 season. Just like in Formula One, the engine proved to be extremely unsuccessful, and the AR20 Subaru only qualified for one race. On its début at the 1990 480 km of Suzuka, for example, the AR20, driven by Gianfranco Brancatelli and Marco Brand was nearly eight seconds slower in qualifying than any other car, and nearly half a minute slower than the fastest qualifier. The one race it did qualify for, the 1990 480 km of Spa, saw the AR20 unable to make the start due to engine failure. This would also prove to be the AR20's last race with the Subaru engine, as Alba switched to a 4.5-litre Buick V6 for the 1990 480 km of Nürburgring; this was marginally more successful, and would eventually yield a 16th-place finish in the final race of the season, which was the 1990 480 km of Mexico City.

Sports cars Jiotto Caspita and Koenigsegg CC initially were intended to use this engine. Their design was suspended at the prototype stage.

== Complete Formula One results ==
(key)

| Year | Entrant | Chassis | Engine | Tyre | Driver | Grands Prix | | | | | | | | | | | | | | | | Pts. | WCC |
| Year | Entrant | Chassis | Engine | Tyre | Driver | USA | BRA | SMR | MON | CAN | MEX | FRA | GBR | GER | HUN | BEL | ITA | POR | ESP | JPN | AUS | Pts. | WCC |
|---|---|---|---|---|---|---|---|---|---|---|---|---|---|---|---|---|---|---|---|---|---|---|---|
| 1990 | Subaru Coloni Racing | Coloni C3B | Subaru 1235; 3.5 F12 | G | (Belgium) Bertrand Gachot | DNPQ | DNPQ | DNPQ | DNPQ | DNPQ | DNPQ | DNPQ | DNPQ | | | | | | | | | 0 | NC |
