= EuroBrun ER189 =

EuroBrun ER189 EuroBrun ER189B
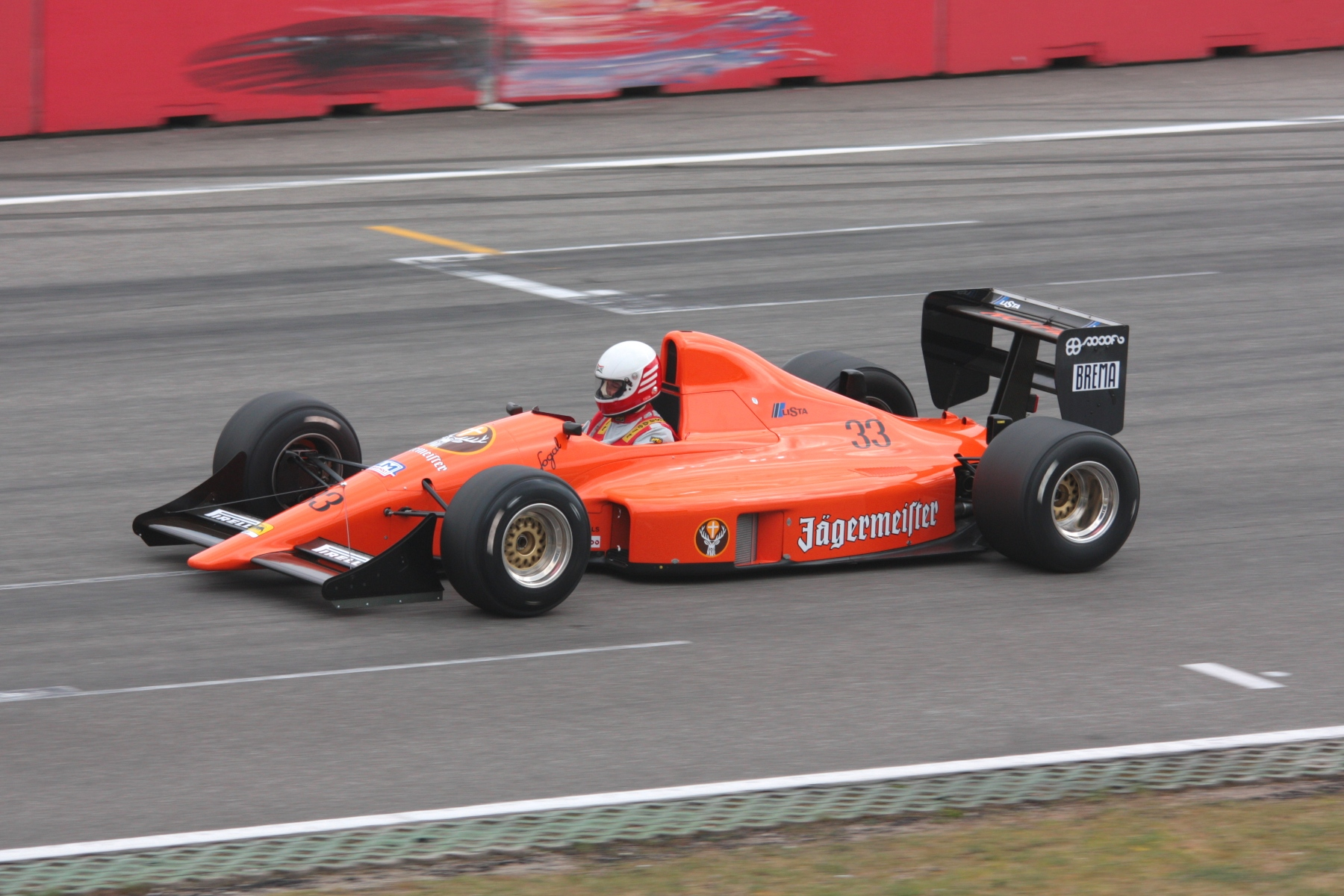
- Category: Formula One
- Constructor: EuroBrun
- Designers: George Ryton (Technical Director); Roberto Ori (Chief Designer); Tim Feast (Chief Engineer)
- Predecessor: EuroBrun ER188

Technical specifications
- Chassis: Carbon fibre monocoque
- Axle track: Front: 1,810 mm (71 in); Rear: 1,688 mm (66.5 in)
- Wheelbase: 2,905 mm (114.4 in)
- Engine: Judd EV, 3,496 cc (213.3 cu in), 76° V8, NA mid-engine, longitudinally mounted
- Transmission: EuroBrun 6-speed manual
- Fuel: 1989: Elf; 1989 and 1990: Agip
- Tyres: Pirelli

Competition history
- Notable entrants: EuroBrun Racing
- Notable drivers: 33. (Argentina) Oscar Larrauri; 33. (Switzerland) Gregor Foitek; 33. (Brazil) Roberto Moreno; 34. (Italy) Claudio Langes
- Debut: 1989 German Grand Prix
Races	Wins	Poles	F/Laps
22	0	0	0

The EuroBrun ER189 and ER189B were Formula One cars built and raced by the EuroBrun team for the 1989 and 1990 Formula One seasons. The cars were designed by George Ryton and were powered by a normally aspirated Judd EV engine.

== 1989 ==
The ER189 debuted in the 1989 British Grand Prix, driven by Swiss Gregor Foitek, who failed to pre-qualify. Foitek was unable to get out of Friday pre-qualifying for the next three races and left the team after the 1989 Belgian Grand Prix. Oscar Larrauri, who had driven for the team the previous year, was called back to finish the season, although he failed to pre-qualify for a single race as well.

== 1990 ==
Ryton designed a revision, the ER189B, for the 1990 Formula One season. The team hired Brazilian Roberto Moreno and Italian Claudio Langes, and while the car was not bad there was no money for development, despite the best efforts of Dutch engineer Kees Van der Grint. Moreno only pre-qualified on five occasions and raced twice, finishing 13th in the 1990 United States Grand Prix, after qualifying 16th, ahead of Nigel Mansell. Langes never escaped from pre-qualifying. The team closed down at the end of the European season, and did not compete in the last two races of 1990.

== Complete Formula One results ==
(key)

Year	Chassis	Engines	Tyres	Driver(s)	Grands Prix																Points	WCC
Year	Chassis	Engines	Tyres	Driver(s)	BRA	SMR	MON	MEX	USA	CAN	FRA	GBR	GER	HUN	BEL	ITA	POR	ESP	JPN	AUS	Points	WCC
1989	ER189	Judd CV V8	P	(Switzerland) Gregor Foitek									DNPQ	DNPQ							0	NC
1989	ER189	Judd CV V8	P	(Argentina) Oscar Larrauri												DNPQ	DNPQ	DNPQ	DNPQ	DNPQ	0	NC
1990	ER189B	Judd CV V8	P		USA	BRA	SMR	MON	CAN	MEX	FRA	GBR	GER	HUN	BEL	ITA	POR	ESP	JPN	AUS	0	NC
1990	ER189B	Judd CV V8	P	(Brazil) Roberto Moreno	13	DNPQ	Ret	DNQ	DNQ	EX	DNPQ	DNPQ	DNPQ	DNPQ	DNPQ	DNPQ	DNPQ	DNPQ			0	NC
1990	ER189B	Judd CV V8	P	(Italy) Claudio Langes	DNPQ	DNPQ	DNPQ	DNPQ	DNPQ	DNPQ	DNPQ	DNPQ	DNPQ	DNPQ	DNPQ	DNPQ	DNPQ	DNPQ			0	NC
