= Paolo Coloni =

Italian racing driver

- Nationality: Italian
- Born: 24 May 1969 (age 57)

Paolo Coloni (born 24 May 1969) is an Italian former racing driver. He has competed in such series as the German Formula Three Championship and the Italian Formula Three Championship. He finished in second-place in the Masters of Formula 3 race of 1993.

From 2010 to 2022, Coloni was team principal at Coloni Motorsport, a motor racing team founded in 1982 by his father, Enzo Coloni. In 2023, he established the Paolo Coloni Racing Team.
