= Roberto Moreno =

Brazilian racing driver (born 1959)

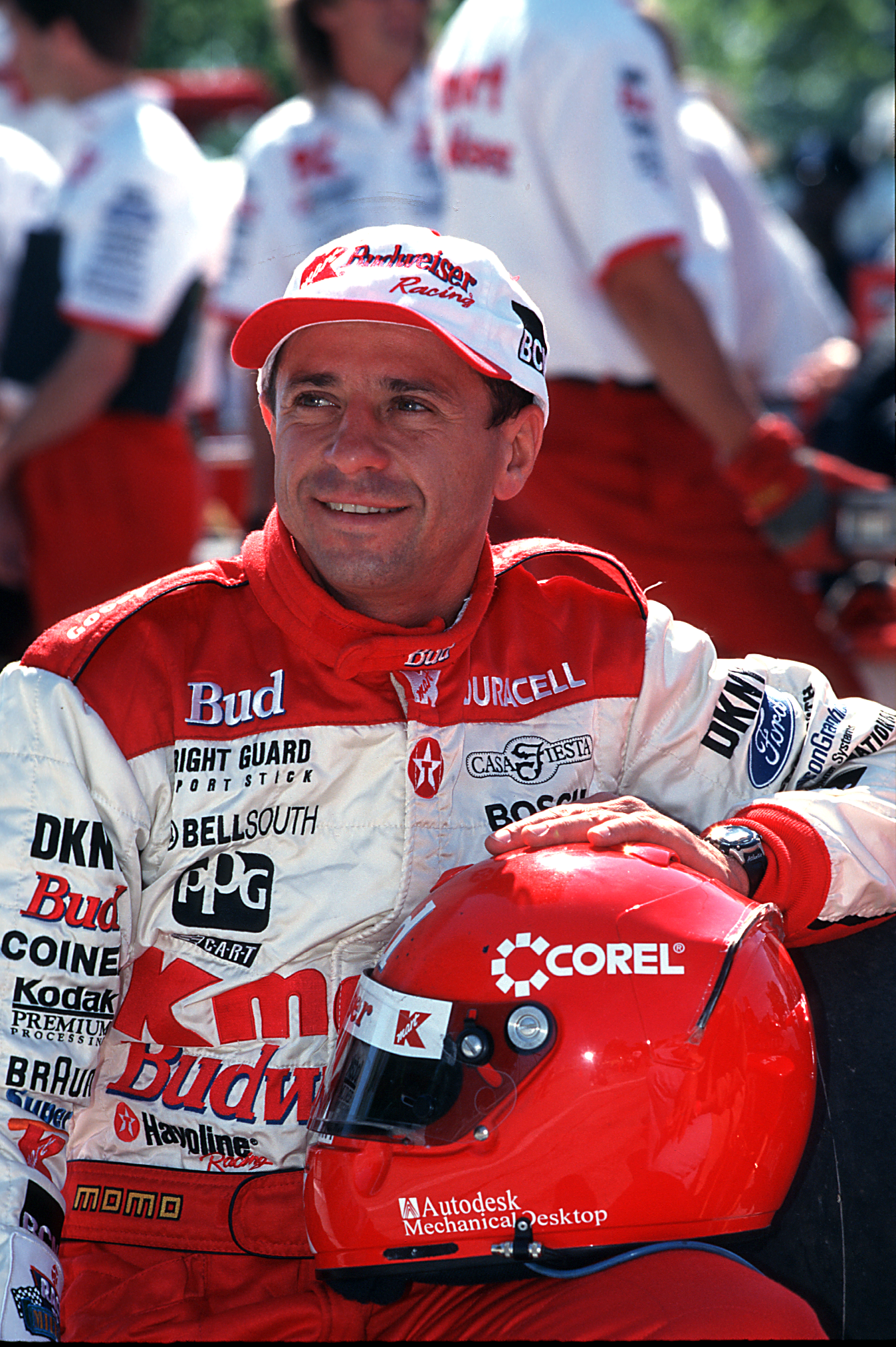
- Moreno in 1997
- Born: Roberto Pupo Moreno; 11 February 1959 (age 67); Rio de Janeiro, Brazil

Formula One World Championship career
- Nationality: (Brazil) Brazilian
- Active years: 1982, 1987, 1989–1992, 1995
- Team(s): Lotus, AGS, Coloni, EuroBrun, Benetton, Jordan, Minardi, Andrea Moda and Forti
- Entries: 77 (41 starts)
- Championships: 0
- Wins: 0
- Podiums: 1
- Career points: 15
- Pole positions: 0
- Fastest laps: 1
- First entry: 1982 Dutch Grand Prix
- Last entry: 1995 Australian Grand Prix

CART & Champ Car World Series
- Years active: 1985–1986, 1996–2001, 2003, 2007
- Teams: Galles Racing; Payton/Coyne Racing; Bettenhausen Motorsports; Newman/Haas Racing; Project Indy; PacWest Racing; Patrick Racing; Herdez Competition; Pacific Coast Motorsports
- Starts: 120
- Wins: 2
- Poles: 2
- Best finish: 3rd in 2000

Previous series
- 1980 1981–1982 1981–1982 1982 1983 1984 1984–1985 1986 1985–1988 1988 1992 1993 1999, 2006–2007 2005, 2007: British Formula Ford 1600; British Formula 3 Championship; European F.Three Championship; Formula Pacific New Zealand International Series; Formula Mondial North America; European Formula Two Championship; Japanese Formula Two; CART; International Formula 3000; Honda CR-X Challenge; Italian Superturismo Championship; French Supertouring Championship; IRL IndyCar Series; Rolex Sports Car Series

Championship titles
- 1980 1980 1982 1982 1988: British Formula Ford 1600; Formula Ford Festival; Macau Grand Prix; Formula Pacific New Zealand; International Formula 3000

Roberto Pupo Moreno (born 11 February 1959) is a Brazilian former racing driver. He participated in 75 Formula One Grands Prix, achieved one podium, and scored a total of fifteen championship points. He was known as the "Super Sub" late in his career as he was used to replace injured drivers several times.

Moreno raced in CART in 1986, and was Formula 3000 champion (in 1988) before joining Formula One full-time in 1989. He returned to CART in 1996, where he enjoyed an Indian summer in 2000 and 2001, and managed to extend his career in the series until 2008. He also raced in endurance events and GT's in Brazil, but now works as a driver coach and consultant, and although this takes up a lot of his time, he is not officially retired yet, as he appears in historic events. Away from the sport, he enjoys building light aeroplanes.

== Career ==
=== Early career ===
After winning the 1976 Brazilian 125cc Karting championship, Moreno set his sights on getting to Europe. He arrived in England in 1979, to race in his first season in Formula Ford. He did some races with Marc Smith racing who was the works Royale driver for that year. Marc had a two car transporter to take his and Roberto's car. Roberto was the driver and the mechanic for his Royale car. Ralt owner/designer Ron Tauranac lent Moreno an old shed to work out of as his home base. He had a couple of good results, and these convinced Ralph Firman Sr, to sign him as a works Van Diemen driver for the 1980 season. Whilst driving for Firman, he would win the Townsend Thoresen British Formula Ford title, winning eight races in the process. Meanwhile, in Europe, he drove the same car to three more victories, earning himself second place in the EFDA Townsend Thoresen Euroseries Formula Ford 1600 Championship. His also finished 4th in the RAC British series and sixth the P&O Ferries series. He then rounded out the season by winning the Formula Ford Festival. Moreno would return to race at the Formula Ford Festival in the same car at the 50th anniversary of the Festival in 2021.

Moreno's success alerted the attention of no lesser person than Colin Chapman, the successful owner and founder of Formula One's Team Lotus. Roberto only returned to Europe in 1981, because Chapman had given him a F1 testing contract with enough money to continue racing. With these funds, he raced Formula Three, but money was tight. Despite that, paired with Barron Racing, he managed to win two races, however he was more successful across the Atlantic the following season, racing in the CASC North American Formula Atlantic Championship, defeating Al Unser Jr. in a supporting race at the 1982 United States Grand Prix West in Long Beach. Later in 1982, he made another big impression by winning the Grand Prix de Trois-Rivières. Prior to that victory, Moreno had found some money to do half a season in the British Formula 3 Championship with Ivens Lumar Racing, winning three races in the process, before he was given the opportunity to drive at the 1982 Dutch Grand Prix at Zandvoort for Lotus, though he ultimately failed to qualify.

=== Australian Grand Prix (1981–1984) ===
In this period, Moreno (who like his friend Nelson Piquet was managed by Australian Greg "Pee Wee" Siddle) was a popular triple winner of the Australian Grand Prix in 1981, 1983 and 1984, before it became a Formula One World Championship race from 1985. These wins came in the days when the Grand Prix was a Formula Mondial race held at Melbourne's 1.6 km (1.0 mi) Calder Park Raceway. He often defeated current or past World Drivers' Champions to win the AGP, including Piquet, Alan Jones, Niki Lauda and Keke Rosberg, as well as other F1 drivers such as Jacques Laffite, Andrea de Cesaris and François Hesnault. In the only Australian Grand Prix he competed in but did not win during the period (1982), he finished third behind future four time World Champion Alain Prost, and Ligier F1 driver Laffite. In all of his pre-F1 Australian Grand Prix drives, Moreno drove a Formula Pacific or Formula Mondial Ralt RT4 powered by a 1.6 litre Ford 4cyl engine.

=== F1 substitute (1982 and 1987) ===
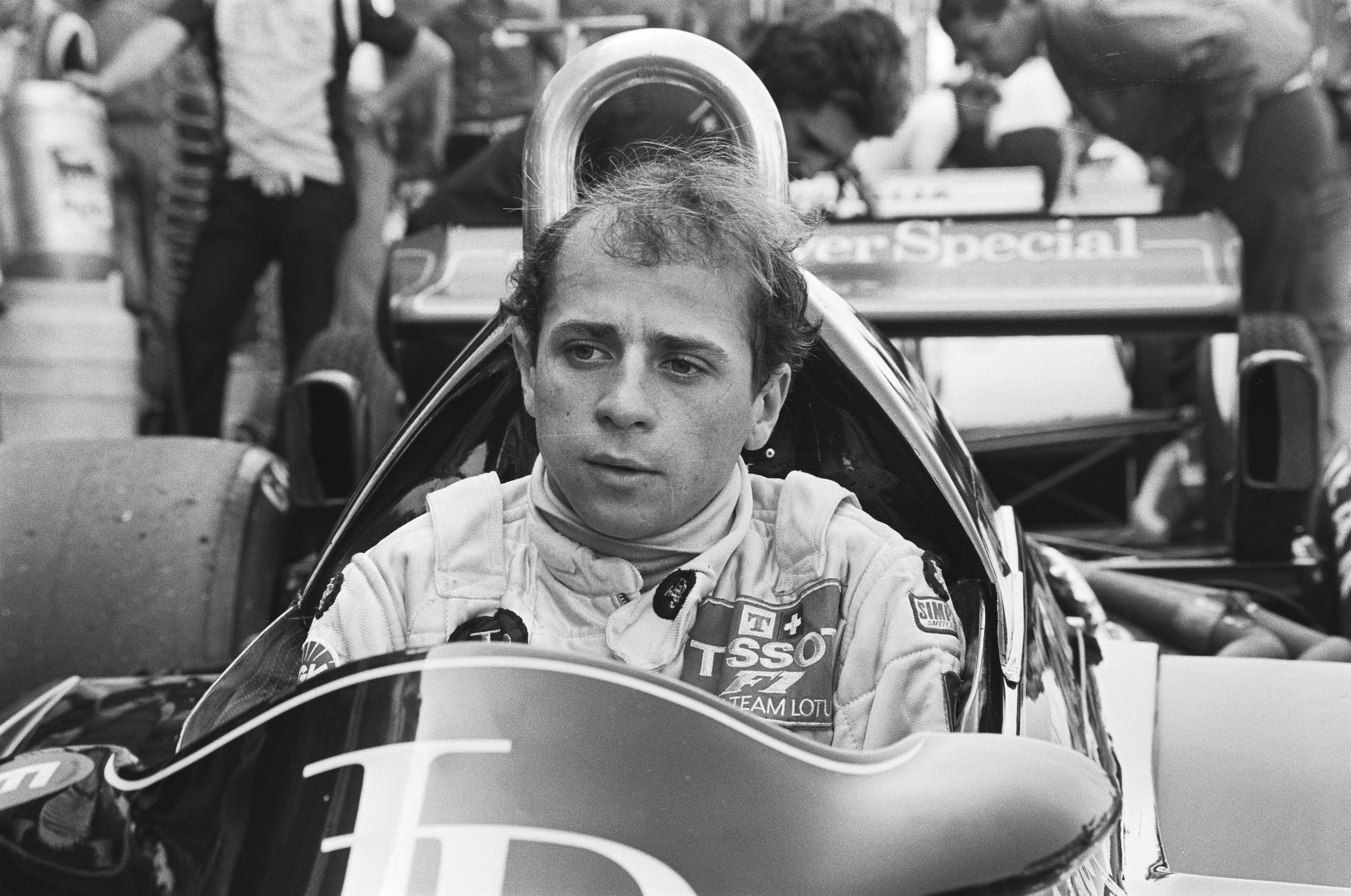
Moreno at the 1982 Dutch Grand Prix.

Moreno was winning races in Formula Atlantic, Formula Mondial and Formula Three, when he received a call-up from Colin Chapman to stand in for Nigel Mansell at Lotus at the 1982 Dutch Grand Prix after Mansell broke his wrist in the previous Grand Prix in Canada. Prior to this, Theodore Racing's Jan Lammers broke a thumb during the Detroit Grand Prix and team owner Teddy Yip wanted Moreno to take over the seat, however Chapman refused to release him. Then during the race in Montréal, Mansell injured his wrist, allowing for Moreno to stand in. This soon turned into a nightmare, as the Lotus 91 was a beast to handle, Moreno had barely driven the car, as regular drivers, Mansell and Elio de Angelis did most of the testing, with Moreno being restricted to the older Lotus 87B and Lotus 88 models. Moreno failed to come to grips with the Lotus 91, with his best qualifying lap over two seconds away from making the grid. At the end of 1982, Lotus released him from his duties as test driver and it took his reputation a while to recover from this poor showing.

Moreno was to get another chance, but that Dutch race handicapped him for a number of years. At the end of the 1987 season he was called up to replace Pascal Fabre for the AGS team at the Japanese Grand Prix. Five years after the Lotus fiasco, Moreno was set to make his debut, except he was the slowest of all and once again did not qualify. However, Williams driver Nigel Mansell injured himself during practice and the team subsequently withdrew his entry, thus letting Moreno in for his debut Grand Prix. In the following race, the Australian Grand Prix, he drove the ungainly JH22 between the walls of the Adelaide Street Circuit to finish a fine seventh, while others hit the walls and broke their cars. Following post-race scrutineering, Ayrton Senna's Lotus-Honda was disqualified from 2nd for oversized brake ducts and Moreno was promoted to sixth place, scoring his, and the team's, first-ever point in Formula One.

=== In between years ===
Moreno went back to North America with Siddle. A sponsor had been found for a whole season of Formula Atlantic, but the support race at Long Beach GP was changed to Super Vee, then he lost his sponsor. Despite the set-back, his new team, Theodore Racing went off and won the first race at Willow Springs. With the prize money, he did two more races, before the team stopped racing. Luckily for Moreno, the team owner, Teddy Yip, helped finance a move to another team. He won four races, while championship rival, Michael Andretti won three. Moreno missed out on the title as every time he won, Andretti would finish second.

For 1984, Roberto decided to return to Europe to race F3. Whilst pre-season testing with West Surrey Racing, he got an invitation from Tauranac to join the works Ralt Formula Two team. Moreno finished runner-up to Mike Thackwell, the pair dominated the final European Formula Two Championship, in their Ralt-Hondas. He tasted victory at the Hockenheim and Donington Park races. Tauranac wanted Moreno to stay for the inaugural International Formula 3000 season (1985), but Moreno had been testing the Toleman at the end of 1984, with Senna's car. He look set to get a drive with the team, only to be told that they did not have any tyres, and the deal fell through. A move to Indycars was next for Roberto with Rick Galles's Galles Racing, as he had seen Moreno impress frequently. The deal was for Roberto to drive in road races. He was invited to do a full campaign in 1986, however they had problems with the car and did not have any good results. When he was unable to find a full-time Indycar drive, he decided to try to get into F3000 driving with Ralt. During that season, he won the Gran Premio del Mediterraneo, together with some consistent finishing saw him finished 3rd overall, before receiving the call to join up with AGS.

Moreno almost joined the Brabham Formula One team in 1984. On the suggestion of his friend, Brabham lead driver and defending World Champion Nelson Piquet, Brabham team owner Bernie Ecclestone almost signed the young Brazilian to drive the team's #2 car. However, this opportunity for Moreno came to nothing when Brabham's Italian based sponsor Parmalat insisted on having an Italian driver as Piquet's teammate. This led to the unique situation where Ecclestone signed brothers Teo and Corrado Fabi to share the drive in the car. Teo was the main driver, but as he was already contracted to race in the United States based CART/PPG World Series for Forsythe Racing, Corrado, who had driven for Osella in 1983, substituted for him in 3 races where the respective F1 and CART schedules clashed.

Moreno's performance at AGS did not get him a seat in F1. He went to Bromley Motorsport in F3000. The team, owned by Ron Salt, had Gary Anderson as its Technical Director, with whom Roberto had worked with at Galles. With help from Reynard Motorsport, they began the season with virtually no money. Revenge was sweet, when Moreno took a sponsorless Reynard-Cosworth 88D to the title by winning three early-season races, at Pau, Silverstone and Monza in a row. A fourth win came in the Birmingham Superprix.

Also in 1988, Moreno made an appearance at Snetterton in the Celebrity Car in the inaugural Honda CR-X Challenge.

=== F1 substitute (1989–1995) ===
Not even winning the FIA International Formula 3000 Championship in 1988 in an unsponsored Reynard 88D made the impression needed for a big team to recruit Moreno. Instead, he signed a testing contract with Ferrari, who helped him land a racing drive with the ambitious Coloni outfit. The car was never competitive and Moreno only made the grid four times out of 16 attempts.

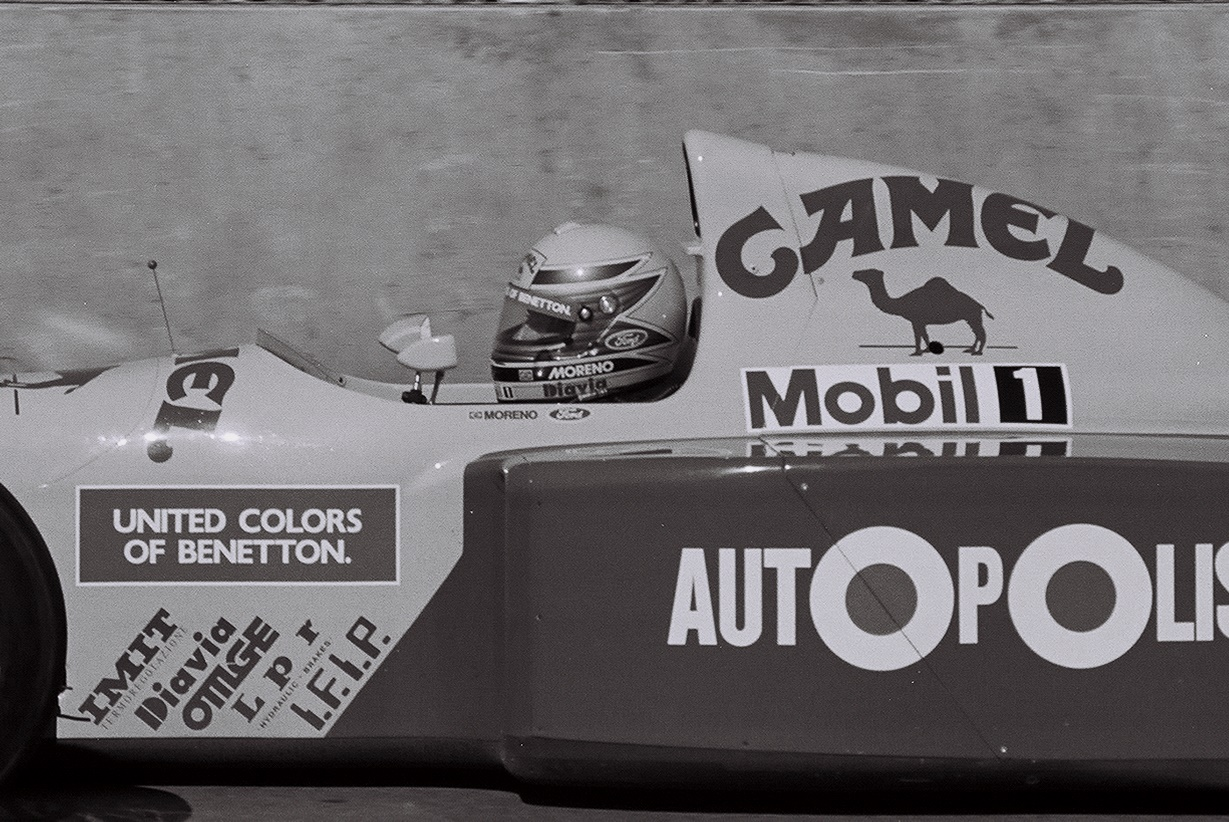
Moreno driving for Benetton at the 1991 United States Grand Prix.

Initially, 1990 seemed to be even less promising, with Moreno signing for the nosediving EuroBrun outfit, qualifying for just two out of the first fourteen races of the season. However, shortly after being informed the team would not be competing in the last two rounds of the season, he was contacted by Benetton to drive their second car, with Alessandro Nannini having almost lost a hand in a helicopter crash following the Spanish Grand Prix. After qualifying eighth, he then shadowed his teammate, Piquet, coming home an excellent second on his Benetton debut in the 1990 Japanese Grand Prix at Suzuka, although this result was helped by most other top cars dropping out, with Alain Prost and Ayrton Senna famously colliding at the first corner while their teammates Nigel Mansell (Ferrari) and Gerhard Berger (McLaren) would both retire. After then again qualifying 8th in the Australian Grand Prix in Adelaide before going on to finish 7th (Piquet again won), Moreno got a full contract with Benetton for 1991 season.

However, the Benetton B191, on Pirelli tyres, was not as competitive as anticipated, and Moreno's best results were fourth place at the Monaco Grand Prix and the Belgian Grand Prix. In the latter race, Moreno made the fastest lap, but this was overshadowed by F1 debutant Michael Schumacher (driving for the Jordan team); this would be Moreno's last race for Benetton before he was controversially paid off and dropped in favour of Schumacher. Schumacher had qualified seventh, and was up to fifth after the start when his clutch failed. The Benetton management, led by Tom Walkinshaw and team manager Flavio Briatore, were after a driver to rebuild the team around, convinced that neither the aging Piquet or Moreno were that driver. Briatore and Walkinshaw engaged in some high-level dealing behind the scenes and managed to steal Schumacher from Jordan and Moreno was promptly fired. There are rumours to this day that Moreno was purposely driving within himself for the whole season in order to not show Piquet up (Piquet later admitted on Brazilian television in 2012 that after his qualifying accident at Imola in 1987 in which he lost around 80% of his depth perception, he only stayed in Formula One "for the money"). As it was, Moreno was offered the vacant Jordan drive for the 1991 Italian Grand Prix, where he qualified a very respectable ninth (ahead of teammate Andrea de Cesaris). Unfortunately he spun off on the second lap and retired. He would race the next race in Portugal, and then replaced Gianni Morbidelli in the Minardi, at the last race of the year in Adelaide, but Formula One seemed to have passed him by.

Moreno at the 1992 Monaco Grand Prix

For the 1992 season, Moreno found himself back with the minnows, signing for Andrea Moda. The outfit had risen from the ashes of Scuderia Coloni, and after two non-starting races with Alex Caffi and Enrico Bertaggia, decided to start over with Moreno and Perry McCarthy (who would later claim fame as the original Stig on the BBC motoring show Top Gear). Moreno and McCarthy faced an uphill struggle, with the uncompetitive team scrambling to even get to most races. Moreno would only qualify the under-tested, under-funded car once, for the Monaco Grand Prix, before the team collapsed following team owner Andrea Sassetti's arrest at the Belgian Grand Prix. After the Andrea Moda disaster, Moreno spent the next two seasons racing Italian and French touring cars, and also attempted to qualify for the 1994 Indianapolis 500. 1995 saw Moreno making a brief Formula One comeback with Forti.

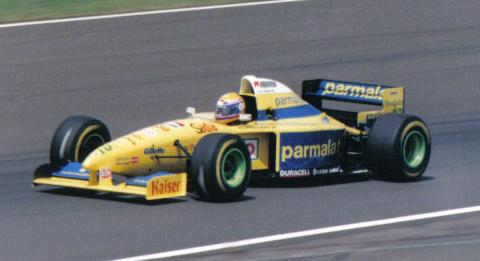
Moreno spent his last season of Formula One with the Forti team.

Moreno's Brazilian heritage helped him land the drive. Sadly, their car was comparatively slow, and Moreno's best result was fourteenth in the Belgian Grand Prix. (He finished 11th on the road in Argentina but he was 9 laps down and not classified). He would exit Formula One crashing into the pitlane wall at the Australian Grand Prix.

=== IndyCar ===
1996 would see Moreno resume his Champ Car career, as he raced a Payton-Coyne Racing Lola-Ford, finishing 3rd at Michigan. At the beginning of 1997, he quit Payton-Coyne for its lack of commitment. He drove for three teams during the 1997 season, earning the nickname "Supersub", with his best result of fifth at Detroit in a Newman-Haas Swift-Ford. Here, he replaced an injured Christian Fittipaldi. He outqualified the team leader, Michael Andretti on several occasions, but still could not pick up a competitive drive for 1998, instead accepting a testing role with Penske.

1998 was more barren, with just three drives. The following season again saw him take two different cars (Newman/Haas and PacWest), with two fourth places his best. In 1999, he also made his first Indy Racing League start at Phoenix International Raceway finishing 6th and returned to the Indianapolis 500 after a thirteen year absence finishing 20th for Truscelli Team Racing. Only in 2000, having subbed for Patrick Racing in the previous season, Roberto was granted a full-time seat in one of their Reynard Motorsport-Fords, and he led the series for much of the distance, before hitting a low patch, and losing out to Gil de Ferran, eventually ranking 3rd overall.

Moreno won his first Champ Car race at Cleveland, and in a scene scarcely seen in motor racing, the emotional Moreno wept openly. It had been his first race victory since his Formula 3000 victory twelve years earlier. He won again for Patrick Racing at Vancouver the following year, but was less consistent and dropped to 13th in the standings.

In 2003, Moreno drove for Herdez Competition, taking his Lola-Cosworth to 2nd at Miami, and announced his retirement from motorsport at the end of the year.

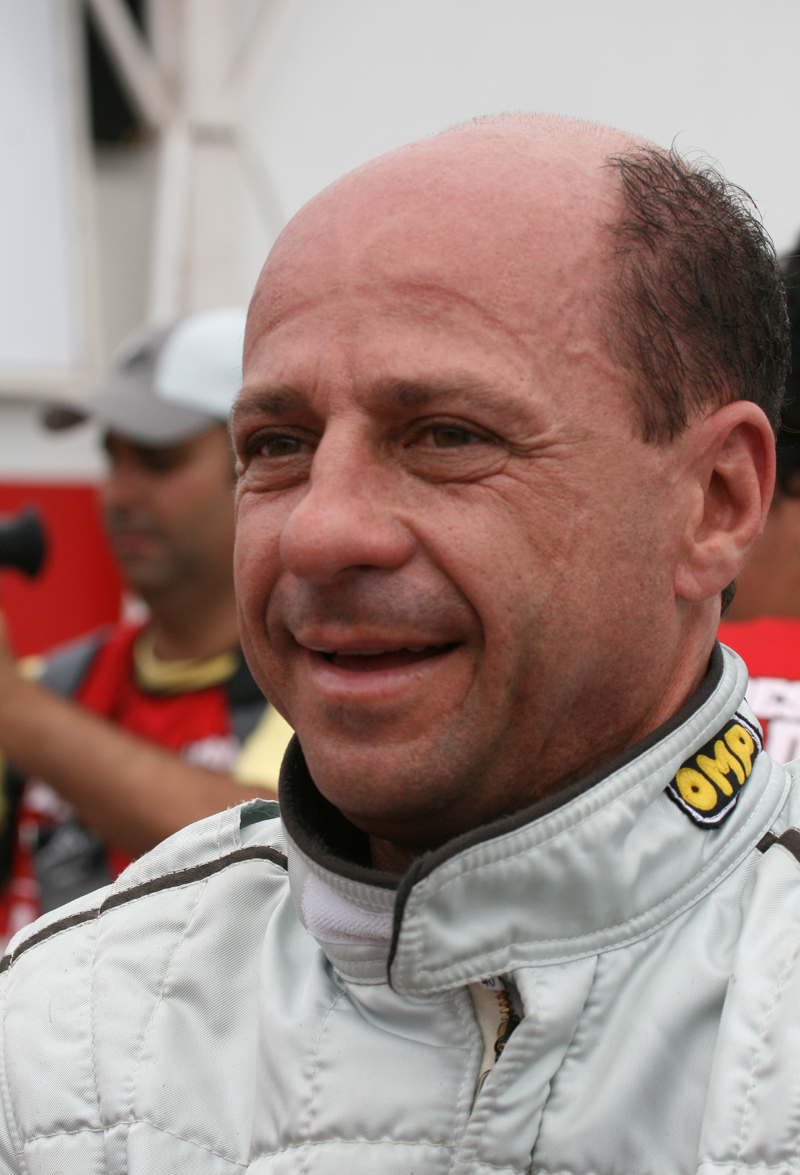
Moreno in 2007.

In April 2006, after just one outing in a Brazilian Stock Car at Jacarepaguá, Moreno substituted for Ed Carpenter at Vision Racing, in the Honda Grand Prix of St. Petersburg.

In August of the same year, Moreno became the first driver to test the new Panoz-built Champ Car. According to former series champion Paul Tracy, "[Moreno's] a guy who's not going to go out there and make mistakes and go off the road. They need to put miles on the car and run it fairly quickly, and he's the perfect guy for the job."

After running thousands of miles of testing in the Panoz DP01, Moreno got a chance to race it at the 2007 Grand Prix of Houston, substituting for the injured Alex Figge at Pacific Coast Motorsports.

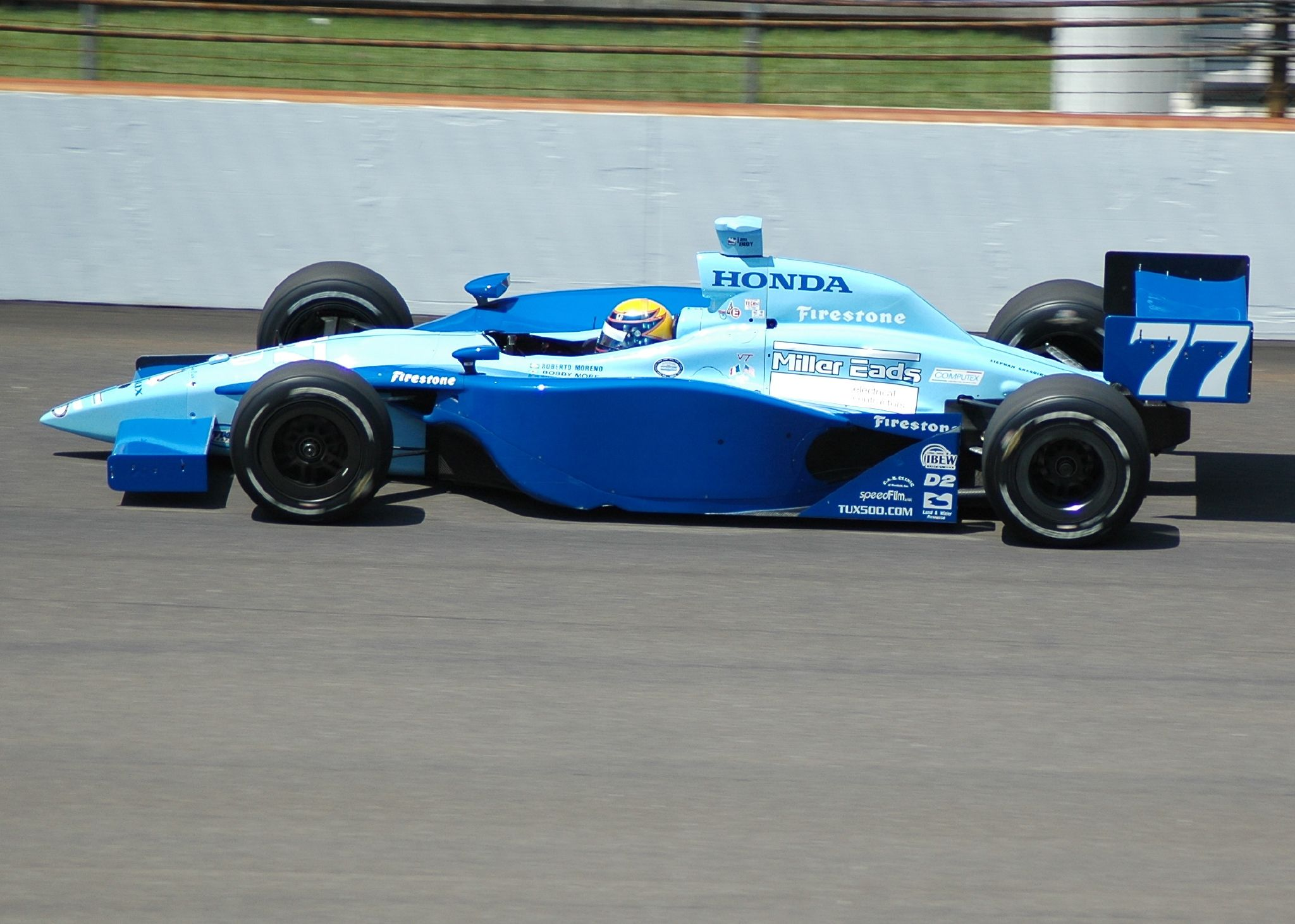
Practicing for the 2007 Indianapolis 500

Moreno drove as a replacement for an injured Stéphan Grégoire at the 2007 Indianapolis 500 for Chastain Motorsports. He crashed the car early in the race and finished in last place.

== Helmet ==
Moreno's helmet has traditionally been yellow, with blue, red, and white wings adorning the visor, sides, and chin area. Written on the lower portion of the helmet is the name "Moreno." Later versions of his helmet have included blue cylindrical designs along with the wings. His helmets are designed by Sid Mosca.

== Racing record ==
=== Career summary ===
Season	Series	Team	Races	Wins	Poles	F/Laps	Podiums	Points	Position
1980	British Formula Ford Championship	Van Diemen	14	8	8	8	12	220	**1st**
1980	P&O Ferries Formula Ford 1600 Championship	Van Diemen	10	1	?	?	?	26	6th
1980	Euroseries Formula Ford 1600	Van Diemen	9	3	3	1	4	104	**2nd**
1980	RAC Formula Ford 1600 Championship	Van Diemen	6	1	?	?	?	47	4th
1980	Formula Ford Festival	Van Diemen	1	1	0	1	1	N/A	**1st**
1981	Marlboro British Formula Three	Barron Racing	12	2	0	1	4	10	11th
1981	European Formula Three	Barron Racing	1	1	1	0	1	9	10th
1982	Marlboro British Formula Three	Ivens Lumar Racing	9	3	0	1	5	42	6th
1982	New Zealand Formula Pacific	Goold Motorsport	8	6	2	5	7	N/A	**1st**
1982	North American Formula Atlantic	Goold Motorsport	3	1	2	2	2	61	9th
1982	Macau Grand Prix		1	1	?	0	1	N/A	**1st**
1982	European Formula Three	Ivens Lumar Racing	1	0	0	0	0	3	16th
1983	Formula Mondial North America	Theodore Racing	8	4	4	3	5	151	**2nd**
1983	IMSA GTU Championship	All American Racers	4	0	0	1	1	14	41st
1983	IMSA Camel GTO Championship	All American Racers	1	0	0	0	1	12	43rd
1983	European Endurance Championship	Charles Ivey Racing	1	0	0	0	0	0	NC
1984	European Formula Two	Ralt Racing	11	2	3	2	7	44	**2nd**
1984	Japanese Formula Two	Ralt Racing	1	0	1	0	1	12	12th
1984	24 Hours of Le Mans	Skoal Bandit Porsche Team	1	0	0	0	0	N/A	DNF
1985	CART PPG Indy Car World Series	Galles Racing	5	0	0	0	0	10	29th
1985	Japanese Formula Two	Advan Sports Nova	5	0	0	0	1	21	11th
1985	International Formula 3000	Barron Racing	4	0	0	0	0	3	14th
1986	CART PPG Indy Car World Series	Galles Racing	16	0	0	0	0	30	16th
1986	International Formula 3000	Bromley Motorsport	1	0	0	0	0	0	31st
1987	International Formula 3000	Ralt Racing	11	1	4	3	5	30	**3rd**
1987	Formula One	Team El Charro AGS	2	0	0	0	0	1	19th
1987	World Touring Car Championship	Schnitzer Motorsport	1	0	0	0	0	0	NC
1988	International Formula 3000	Bromley Motorsport	11	4	3	1	4	43	**1st**
1989	Formula One	Coloni SpA	4	0	0	0	0	0	NC
1990	Formula One	EuroBrun Racing	2	0	0	0	0	6	10th
1990	Formula One	Benetton Formula	2	0	0	0	1	6	10th
1991	Formula One	Camel Benetton Formula	11	0	0	1	0	8	10th
1991	Formula One	Team 7UP Jordan	2	0	0	0	0	8	10th
1991	Formula One	Minardi Team	1	0	0	0	0	8	10th
1992	Italian Superturismo Championship	Repetto Motors	6	0	0	0	0	41	11th
1992	Formula One	Andrea Moda Formula	1	0	0	0	0	0	NC
1993	French Supertouring Championship	Team Usine Alfa Romeo	10	0	0	0	2	94	7th
1995	Formula One	Parmalat Forti Ford	16	0	0	0	0	0	NC
1996	PPG Indy Car World Series	Payton/Coyne Racing	15	0	0	0	1	25	21st
1997	CART PPG World Series	Newman/Haas Racing	6	0	0	0	0	16	19th
1997	CART PPG World Series	Bettenhausen Racing	2	0	0	0	0	16	19th
1997	CART PPG World Series	Payton/Coyne Racing	1	0	0	0	0	16	19th
1998	CART PPG World Series	Project CART	2	0	0	0	0	0	31st
1998	CART PPG World Series	Newman/Haas Racing	1	0	0	0	0	0	31st
1999	CART PPG World Series	PacWest Racing	8	0	0	0	0	58	14th
1999	CART PPG World Series	Newman/Haas Racing	5	0	0	1	1	58	14th
1999	Indy Racing League	Truscelli Team Racing	2	0	0	0	0	38	29th
2000	CART PPG World Series	Patrick Racing	20	1	1	0	6	147	**3rd**
2001	CART PPG World Series	Patrick Racing	20	1	1	1	3	76	13th
2003	CART PPG World Series	Herdez Competition	17	0	0	1	1	67	13th
2005	Rolex Sports Car Series	Spirit of Daytona Racing	6	0	0	0	0	80	39th
2005	Stock Car Brasil	Katalogo Racing	1	0	0	0	0	0	NC
2006	Rolex Sports Car Series	Brumos Racing	2	0	0	0	0	28	86th
2006	IndyCar Series	Vision Racing	1	0	0	0	0	12	30th
2007	GT3 Brasil Championship	CRT	6	0	1	2	0	17	11th
2007	Champ Car World Series	Pacific Coast Motorsports	1	0	0	0	0	9	22nd
2007	IndyCar Series	Chastain Motorsports	1	0	0	0	0	10	36th
2007	Rolex Sports Car Series	Brumos Porsche	1	0	0	0	0	28	58th
2008	Trofeo Maserati Brasil		3	0	0	0	0	6	30th
2008	GT3 Brasil Championship	Tigueis	2	0	0	0	0	0	NC
2008	IndyCar Series	Minardi Team USA/HVM Racing	1	0	0	0	0	0	46th
2008	Champ Car World Series	Minardi Team USA	1	0	0	0	0	0	NC
2008	Rolex Sports Car Series	Krohn Racing	1	0	0	0	0	0	NC
2012	Eurocup Mégane Trophy	Oregon Team	2	0	0	0	0	4	20th
2014	Copa Caçula de Pneus de Marcas e Pilotos	Maguila Motorsport	18	1	1	0	5	193	4th
2022	Historic Grand Prix of Monaco - Series E	Lola	1	0	0	0	0	N/A	5th

=== Complete 24 Hours of Le Mans results ===
Year	Team	Co-Drivers	Car	Class	Laps	Pos.	Class Pos.
1984	(United Kingdom) Skoal Bandit Racing Team	(United Kingdom) Guy Edwards (United Kingdom) Rupert Keegan	Porsche 962	C1	72	DNF (accident)	

=== Complete 24 Hours of Daytona results ===
Year	Team	Co-Drivers	Car	Class	Laps	Pos.	Class Pos.
2005	(United States) Spirit of Daytona Racing	(United States) Doug Goad (France) Stéphane Grégoire (United States) Bob Ward	Crawford-Pontiac DP03	DP	194	DNF (cooling system)	
2007	(United States) Brumos Racing	(United States) J. C. France (United States) Hurley Haywood (Portugal) João Barbosa (United States) David Donohue	Riley-Porsche Mk XI	DP	662	4th	

=== Complete 24 Hours of Spa results ===
Year	Team	Co-Drivers	Car	Class	Laps	Pos.	Class Pos.
1987	(Germany) BMW Schnitzer	(Australia) Allan Grice (Austria) Willi Siller	BMW M3	Div.2	178	DNF (piston)	

=== Complete European Formula Two Championship results ===
(key) (Races in bold indicate pole position; races in italics indicate fastest lap.)

Year	Entrant	Chassis	Engine	1	2	3	4	5	6	7	8	9	10	11	Pos	Pts
1984	Ralt Racing Ltd.	Ralt	Honda	**SIL**; 2	HOC; 1	THR; Ret	VAL; 2	MUG; Ret	PAU; 3	HOC; Ret	**MIS**; NC	PER; 2	DON; 1	**BRH**; 3	**2nd**	**44**

=== Complete International Formula 3000 results ===
(key) (Races in bold indicate pole position; races in italics indicate fastest lap.)

Year	Entrant	1	2	3	4	5	6	7	8	9	10	11	12	Pos.	Pts
1985	Barron Racing	SIL; 6	THR; Ret	EST; 5	NÜR	VAL; 9	PAU	SPA	DIJ	PER	ÖST	ZAN	DON	15th	3
1986	Bromley Motorsport	SIL	VAL	PAU	SPA	IMO	MUG	PER	ÖST	BIR; 10	BUG	JAR		NC	0
1987	Ralt Racing Ltd.	**SIL**; 3	VAL; 11	**SPA**; 3	PAU; 10	DON; 4	PER; 1	**BRH**; 3	BIR; 2	**IMO**; 5	BUG; 9	JAR; Ret		**3rd**	**30**
1988	Bromley Motorsport	JER; Ret	VAL; 4	**PAU**; 1	SIL; 1	**MNZ**; 1	PER; Ret	BRH; Ret	BIR; 1	BUG; 5	ZOL; 5	**DIJ**; Ret		**1st**	**43**

=== Complete Formula One results ===
(key) (races in italics indicate fastest lap)

Year	Entrant	Chassis	Engine	1	2	3	4	5	6	7	8	9	10	11	12	13	14	15	16	17	WDC	Points
1982	John Player Lotus	Lotus 91	Cosworth V8	RSA	BRA	USW	SMR	BEL	MON	DET	CAN	NED; DNQ	GBR	FRA	GER	AUT	SUI	ITA	CPL		NC	0
1987	Team AGS	AGS JH22	Cosworth V8	BRA	SMR	BEL	MON	DET	FRA	GBR	GER	HUN	AUT	ITA	POR	ESP	MEX	JPN; Ret	AUS; 6		19th	1
1989	Coloni SpA	Coloni FC188B	Cosworth V8	BRA; DNQ	SMR; DNQ	MON; Ret	MEX; DNQ	USA; DNQ													NC	0
1989	Coloni SpA	Coloni C3	Cosworth V8						CAN; Ret	FRA; DNQ	GBR; Ret	GER; DNPQ	HUN; DNPQ	BEL; DNPQ	ITA; DNPQ	POR; Ret	ESP; DNPQ	JPN; DNPQ	AUS; DNPQ		NC	0
1990	EuroBrun Racing	EuroBrun ER189	Judd V8	USA; 13	BRA; DNPQ	SMR; Ret	MON; DNQ	CAN; DNQ													10th	6
1990	EuroBrun Racing	EuroBrun ER189B	Judd V8						MEX; EX	FRA; DNPQ	GBR; DNPQ	GER; DNPQ	HUN; DNPQ	BEL; DNPQ	ITA; DNPQ	POR; DNPQ	ESP; DNPQ				10th	6
1990	Benetton Formula	Benetton B190	Ford V8															JPN; 2	AUS; 7		10th	6
1991	Camel Benetton Ford	Benetton B190B	Ford V8	USA; Ret	BRA; 7																10th	8
1991	Camel Benetton Ford	Benetton B191	Ford V8			SMR; 13	MON; 4	CAN; Ret	MEX; 5	FRA; Ret	GBR; Ret	GER; 8	HUN; 8	BEL; 4							10th	8
1991	Team 7UP Jordan	Jordan 191	Ford V8												ITA; Ret	POR; 10	ESP	JPN			10th	8
1991	Minardi Team	Minardi M191	Ferrari V12																AUS; 16		10th	8
1992	Andrea Moda Formula	Andrea Moda S921	Judd V10	RSA	MEX	BRA; DNPQ	ESP; DNPQ	SMR; DNPQ	MON; Ret	CAN; DNPQ	FRA; DNA	GBR; DNPQ	GER; DNPQ	HUN; DNQ	BEL; DNQ	ITA; DNP	POR	JPN	AUS		NC	0
1995	Parmalat Forti Ford	Forti FG01	Ford V8	BRA; Ret	ARG; NC	SMR; NC	ESP; Ret	MON; Ret	CAN; Ret	FRA; 16	GBR; Ret	GER; Ret	HUN; Ret	BEL; 14	ITA; DNS	POR; 17	EUR; Ret	PAC; 16	JPN; Ret	AUS; Ret	NC	0

=== Complete American Open-Wheel racing results ===
(key)

==== CART/Champ Car World Series ====
Year	Team	No.	Chassis	Engine	1	2	3	4	5	6	7	8	9	10	11	12	13	14	15	16	17	18	19	20	21	Rank	Points	Ref
1985	Galles Racing	6	March 85C	Cosworth DFX V8t	LBH	INDY	MIL	POR	MEA; 28	CLE	MIS1	ROA; 16	POC	MDO; 25	SAN	MIS2	LS; 16	PHX	MIA; 5							**28th**	**10**	
1986	Galles Racing	9	Lola T86/00	Cosworth DFX V8t	PHX1; 20	LBH; 6	INDY; 19	MIL; 13	POR; 18	MEA; 18	CLE; 25	TOR; 18	MIS1; 6	POC; 10	MDO; 16	SAN	MIS2; 6	ROA; 16	LS; 20	PHX2; 10	MIA; 17					**16th**	**30**	
1994	Arizona Motorsport	44	Lola T94/00	Ford XB V8t	SRF	PHX	LBH	INDY; DNQ	MIL	DET	POR	CLE	TOR	MIS	MDO	NHM	VAN	ROA	NZR	LS						NC	0	
1996	Payton/Coyne Racing	34	Lola T96/00	Ford XB V8t	MIA; 27	RIO; 9	SRF; 12	LBH; 8	NZR; 24	500; 3	MIL; 25	DET; 23	POR; 19	CLE; 14	TOR; 23	MIS; 23	MDO; 23	ROA; 22	VAN; 27	LS; 12						**21st**	**25**	
1997	Payton/Coyne Racing	34	Lola T97/00	Ford XD V8t	MIA; 24	SRF																				**19th**	**16**	
1997	Newman/Haas Racing	11	Swift 007.i	Ford XD V8t			LBH; 24	NZR; 14	RIO; 18	GAT; 25	MIL; 10	DET; 5	POR	CLE	TOR	MIS	MDO	ROA								**19th**	**16**	
1997	Bettenhausen Racing	16	Reynard 97i	Mercedes-Benz IC108D V8t															VAN; 15	LS; 10	FON					**19th**	**16**	
1998	Project CART	15	Reynard 97i	Mercedes-Benz IC108D V8t	MIA; 15	MOT; 26	LBH	NZR	RIO	GAT																**31st**	**0**	
1998	Newman/Haas Racing	11	Swift 009.c	Ford XD V8t							MIL; 24	DET	POR	CLE	TOR	MIS	MDO	ROA	VAN	LAG	HOU	SRF	FON			**31st**	**0**	
1999	PacWest Racing	18	Reynard 99i	Mercedes-Benz IC108E V8t	MIA	MOT	LBH	NZR	RIO; 11	STL; 4	MIL; 12	POR; 7	CLE; 8	ROA; 19	TOR; 4	MIS; 19										**14th**	**58**	
1999	Newman/Haas Racing	11	Swift 010.c	Ford XD V8t													DET; 14	MDO; 16	CHI; 9	VAN; 15	LS; 2	HOU	SRF	FON		**14th**	**58**	
2000	Patrick Racing	20	Reynard 2Ki	Ford XF V8t	MIA; 2	LBH; 9	RIO; 6	MOT; 3	NZR; 14	MIL; 5	DET; 17	POR; 2	**CLE**; 1*	TOR; 13	MIS; 23	CHI; 6	MDO; 11	ROA; 4	VAN; 10	LS; 25	STL; 3	HOU; 11	SRF; 19	FON; 2		**3rd**	**147**	
2001	Patrick Racing	20	Reynard 01i	Toyota RV8F V8t	MTY; 27	LBH; 11	TXS; NH	NZR; 12	MOT; 10	MIL; 15	DET; 3	POR; 2	CLE; 8	TOR; 11	MIS; 12	CHI; 20	MDO; 6	ROA; 11	VAN; 1	LAU; 23	ROC; 13	HOU; 22	LS; 22	**SRF**; 22*	FON; 19	**13th**	**76**	
2003	Herdez Competition	4	Lola B02/00	Ford XFE V8t	STP; 5	MTY; 6	LBH; 17	BRH; 7	LAU; 10	MIL; 19	LS; 15	POR; 9	CLE; 18	TOR; 6	VAN; 17	ROA; 7	MDO; 19	MTL; 7	DEN; 16	MIA; 2	MXC	SRF; 16				**13th**	**67**	
2007	Pacific Coast Motorsports	29	Panoz DP01	Cosworth XFE V8t	LVG	LBH	HOU; 12	POR	CLE	MTT	TOR	EDM	SJO	ROA	ZOL	ASN	SRF	MXC								**22nd**	**9**	

==== IRL IndyCar Series ====
Year	Team	No.	Chassis	Engine	1	2	3	4	5	6	7	8	9	10	11	12	13	14	15	16	17	18	19	Rank	Points	Ref
1999	Truscelli Team Racing	33	G-Force GF01C	Oldsmobile Aurora V8	WDW	PHX; 6	CLT; C	INDY; 20	TXS	PPIR	ATL	DOV	PPI2	LVS	TX2									**29th**	**38**	
2006	Vision Racing	20	Dallara IR-05	Honda HI6R V8	HMS	STP; 18	MOT	INDY	WGL	TXS	RIR	KAN	NSH	MIL	MIS	KTY	SNM	CHI						30th	12	
2007	Chastain Motorsports	7	Panoz GF09C	Honda HI7R V8	HMS	STP	MOT	KAN	INDY; 33	MIL	TXS	IOW	RIR	WGL	NSH	MDO	MIS	KTY	SNM	DET	CHI			36th	10	
2008	Minardi Team USA HVM Racing	14	Panoz DP01	Cosworth XFE V8t	HMS	STP	MOT^{1} DNP	LBH^{1} 17	KAN	INDY	MIL	TXS	IOW	RIR	WGL	NSH	MDO	EDM	KTY	SNM	DET	CHI	SRF^{2}	46th	0	

^{1} Run on same day.
^{2} Non-points race.

==== Indianapolis 500 ====
Year	Chassis	Engine	Start	Finish	Team
1986	Lola T86/00	Cosworth DFX V8t	32	19	Galles Racing
1994	Lola T94/00	Ford XB V8t	DNQ		Arizona Motorsport
1999	G-Force GF01C	Oldsmobile Aurora V8	23	20	Truscelli Racing
2007	Panoz GF09C	Honda HI7R V8	31	33	Chastain Motorsports

Sporting positions
Preceded by Don Macleod	Formula Ford Festival; Winner; 1980	Succeeded by Tommy Byrne
Preceded by Alan Jones	Australian Grand Prix; Winner; 1981	Succeeded by Alain Prost
Preceded by Bob Earl	Macau Grand Prix; Winner; 1982	Succeeded by Ayrton Senna
Preceded by Alain Prost	Australian Grand Prix; Winner; 1983-1984	Succeeded by Keke Rosberg
Preceded by Stefano Modena	International Formula 3000; Champion; 1988	Succeeded by Jean Alesi
