= Scuderia Coloni =

Motor racing team

(Italy) Scuderia Coloni
- Founded: 1983
- Folded: 2015
- Team principal(s): Paolo Coloni
- Former series: Formula 3000; Italian F3; Formula One; Euroseries 3000; Formula BMW Europe; GP2 Asia Series; GP2 Series; Auto GP
- Noted drivers: (Brazil) Pedro Bianchini (Italy) Marco Bonanomi (Italy) Gianmaria Bruni (Italy) Alex Ciompi (Italy) Luca Filippi (Romania) Michael Herck (Italy) Fabio Onidi (Italy) Giorgio Pantano
- Teams' Championships: Euroseries 3000: 2009
- Drivers' Championships: Italian Formula Three Championship: 1982: Enzo Coloni; 1983: Ivan Capelli; 1984: Alessandro Santin; 1986: Nicola Larini; FIA European Formula 3 Cup: 1985: Alex Caffi

Coloni Motorsport, also known as Scuderia Coloni, was an auto racing team from Italy. Founded by former racing driver Enzo Coloni in 1983, the team participated in Formula Three between 1983 and 1986, before racing in Formula One as Enzo Coloni Racing Car Systems between 1987 and 1991. They made 82 attempts to take part in a Formula One race but only qualified 14 times. After exiting Formula One, under the management of Enzo Coloni's son Paolo, the team was successful in Formula Three, Formula 3000 and GP2. Between 2006 and 2009 the team ran under the name of Fisichella Motor Sport, with support from Formula One driver Giancarlo Fisichella and his manager Enrico Zanarini.

== Origins of the team ==
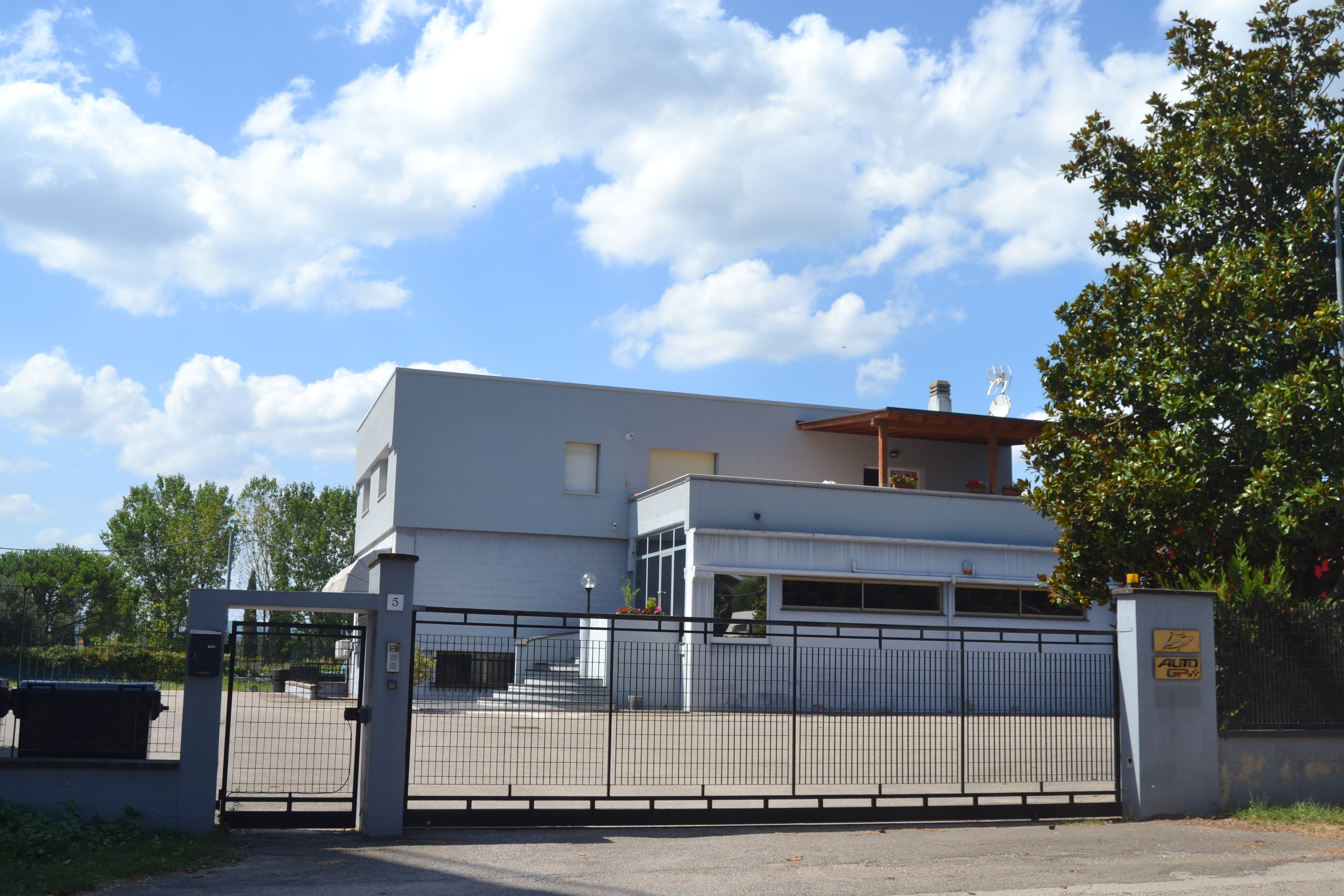
Headquarters of Coloni Motorsport in Passignano sul Trasimeno (2016)

Coloni Motorsport logo

Coloni was founded in 1983 in Passignano sul Trasimeno by Enzo Coloni, a racing driver from Perugia. Nicknamed "Il lupo" (the wolf - a trait that would later be reflected in his company's logo) due to his aggressive racing style, Coloni competed in the Italian Formula Three and European Formula Two series in the late 1970s/early 1980s. In 1982 he decided to race with his own Formula Three team.

== Formula Three and Formula 3000 (1983–1986) ==
In its initial foray, the team was very successful, winning the Italian Formula 3 championship drivers' title for three consecutive times with Enzo Coloni (1982); Ivan Capelli (1983); and Alessandro Santin (1984). At the end of the 1982 season Coloni retired from active racing to focus on managing the team. In 1986 Nicola Larini won the Italian Formula 3 title again and raced, alongside Gabriele Tarquini, in Formula 3000 with a March 85B. Tarquini finished tenth in the championship, his best result a third place in Austria. When FIA announced that turbos would be banned from Formula One from 1989 — making the sport more affordable — Coloni saw an opportunity to enter the category and the team progressed to Formula One the next year.

== Formula One (1987–1991) ==
=== Coloni-Ford (1987–1989) ===
Coloni made its first appearance in Formula One at the 1987 Italian Grand Prix in September 1987, where it failed to qualify. The yellow painted FC187, powered by a Novamotor-prepared Cosworth DFZ, was designed by former Dallara apprentice Roberto Ori. Coloni himself had carried out the shake-down drive and Nicola Larini was signed as the team's sole driver. The Italian recorded Coloni’s first Formula One race start at the 1987 Spanish Grand Prix, although mechanical problems meant that he did not finish. The team did not fly to the end of year overseas races that year, so Larini’s retirement from the Spanish Grand Prix that year ended their first season. They finished 16th and last in the Constructors Championship, the only team without a finish.

The primary emblem used by the team during its participation throughout Formula 1 championships.

The 1988 season was the team's first full season and started well. Although the FC188 was almost identical to its predecessor, Coloni's new driver Gabriele Tarquini qualified regularly and finished 8th at the Canadian Grand Prix. This turned out to be Coloni's best result in Formula One. Due to a shortage of funds very little development work was carried out during the year. The team’s performance suffered as a result and qualification or even prequalification were no longer certain. The team scored no points, finishing again 15th, ahead of Osella, the new EuroBrun and the suffering Zakspeed teams.

The 1989 Monaco Grand Prix was the only race in which two Colonis qualified. Raphanel leads Piquet (Lotus) through the tunnel.

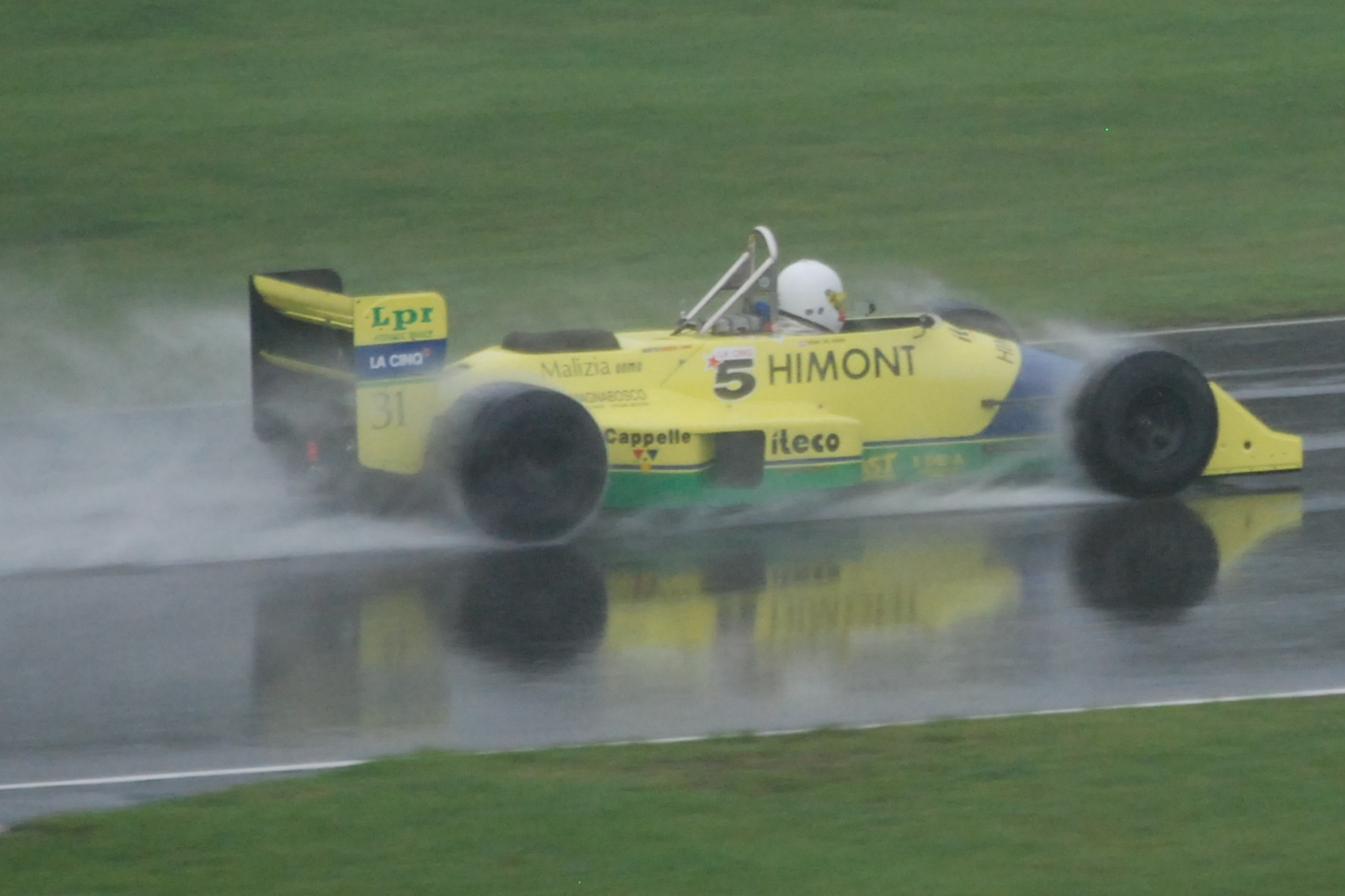
The 1989 Coloni FC188B being demonstrated in 2008.

In 1989, Coloni entered two cars for Roberto Moreno and French newcomer Pierre-Henri Raphanel. The FC188Bs were another update of the 1987 car, but were hard to handle and about 20 km/h slower than the rest of the grid. Nevertheless, both drivers were able to qualify for the Monaco Grand Prix. This was the only race participation of a Coloni in the first part of the season. In Canada, Coloni presented a new car (the Coloni C3) which was penned by former AGS engineer Christian Vanderpleyn. The C3 was a basically good design but the team's performance suffered from lack of testing, often struggling to find the right setup for the races. The team failed to qualify for most of the rest of the season — only in three cases, the debut of the Coloni C3, the 1989 Canadian Grand Prix, the 1989 British Grand Prix and at the Portuguese Grand Prix did Moreno qualify, in 26th, 23rd and 15th place respectively, after a developmental front wing was fitted for Estoril. Unfortunately for the team, he then collided with Eddie Cheever in the warm-up and had to use the spare car. He did not finish the race as the engine blew up after a handful of laps. As results failed to arrive, the team was cut back throughout the year. After Vanderpleyn had left the team in September, Enzo Coloni took over the engineer's job himself but this brought no improvement; neither did the new driver Enrico Bertaggia who replaced Raphanel for the last races. The team finished equal 18th and last with Zakspeed. The Portuguese Grand Prix proved to be the last qualification for a Coloni car.

=== Coloni-Subaru (1990) ===
In 1990 Coloni struck a deal with Subaru, the automobile branch of Fuji Heavy Industries. The Japanese car manufacturer took over 51% of the team and supplied a brand new flat-12 engine designed by Carlo Chiti. Enzo Coloni staying on board as the man responsible for operations. By the beginning of 1990, the Subaru engine was not producing more than 500 bhp. A handful of Coloni's mechanics worked on a single C3 and tried to put the Subaru engine in it. The work was not done until the day the FIA started shipping the Formula One material to Phoenix. In the pits at Phoenix, the car was assembled for the very first time and a short shakedown took place in the parking area of an American supermarket. The car didn't have an airbox and sported wide, long sidepods. It did not follow common design practices for the time, was overweight by 300 pounds (140 kg) and proved uncompetitive. Neither at Phoenix nor at any other race did Bertrand Gachot, Coloni's new driver, manage to prequalify the car. Although lacking aerodynamic downforce or the engine power necessary to be competitive, the C3 was described by Gachot (speaking in 2021) as "the most fun" car he drove during his F1 career. As the season went on, improvements were few and results stayed nowhere. In May, Subaru decided to remove Enzo Coloni from his sporting director role, but no improvement came, and the Japanese company decided to withdraw from the partnership, selling the team back to Enzo Coloni, debt free, but with no sponsors and no engines. By the German Grand Prix Coloni had arranged a supply of Ford-Cosworth engines, prepared by Langford & Peck. An improved car also appeared in Germany. The C3C was a 1989 C3 with minor aerodynamic changes. The car was quicker but not enough to achieve any serious results. Gachot was usually able to prequalify his car but the qualification for the race was still out of reach. At the end of the season, Coloni had not qualified for a single Grand Prix.

=== Coloni-Ford (1991) ===
For the 1991 season the team consisted of only six people, and would be the last time a Formula One team entered only one car during the entire season. The car was another version of the C3 from 1989 which had seen some detail work from students of the University of Perugia and which was now called a C4. Enzo Coloni had hoped to sign Andrea de Cesaris as his first driver, who had backing from Marlboro, but De Cesaris opted to go with Jordan Grand Prix. Coloni handed his single car to newcomer Pedro Chaves from Portugal, who had just won the British Formula 3000 series in 1990. The car was out of date, fragile and hard to handle and Chaves was not familiar with most of the tracks. As a result, Chaves never escaped prequalification, and quit the team after the Portuguese Grand Prix. For the following race, Coloni was unable to find a new driver, but for the last two races of the season, he employed Naoki Hattori, a Japanese driver with a very decent record in other formulae but with no experience in Formula One. The results did not improve and Coloni sold his team to Andrea Sassetti, who renamed it Andrea Moda Formula for 1992.

== Formula Three (1991–1996) ==
The team had another stint in Formula 3 before eventually stepping up to Formula 3000. Enzo's son, Paolo Coloni, drove for the team in the Italian Championship between 1991 and 1993. He also finished second in the 1993 Masters of Formula 3. When Paolo left the Italian series, the team continued in Italian F3 until the end of 1996, with Esteban Tuero and Dino Morelli at the wheel.

== Formula 3000 ==
Coloni Motorsport made the switch to International Formula 3000 in 1997. They made a breakthrough year in 2002, when Giorgio Pantano and Enrico Toccacelo drove for the team. Pantano finished the year as runner-up, with Toccacelo in ninth, taking three wins between them. Ricardo Sperafico and Zsolt Baumgartner drove for Coloni in 2003, with Sperafico finishing as series runner-up, while Baumgartner made his Formula One debut for Jordan Grand Prix at his home race — the 2003 Hungarian Grand Prix.

== GP2 Series ==
The team continued to race in the Formula One feeder series — which was rebranded as the GP2 Series in 2005. Mathias Lauda and Gianmaria Bruni, who had raced in F1 for Minardi in 2004, started the season, although Toni Vilander and Ferdinando Monfardini raced Bruni's car following his departure from the team with three rounds left.

=== Fisichella Motor Sport ===
At the end of 2005, Formula One driver Giancarlo Fisichella joined forces with Coloni. The team officially competed as Fisichella Motor Sport in the 2006-2009 seasons.

=== Coloni's return ===
Coloni officially made a comeback as her own team for the 2010 season. The team competed under the name Scuderia Coloni. The vehicles were painted silver and had black and red accents. The drivers were the Brazilian Alberto Valerio and the Bulgarian Vladimir Arabadzhiev. For the last two races of the year in Monza and Abu Dhabi, Arabadzhiev was replaced by New Zealander Brendon Hartley. Coloni scored a total of 18 points in 2010 and finished tenth in the team rankings.

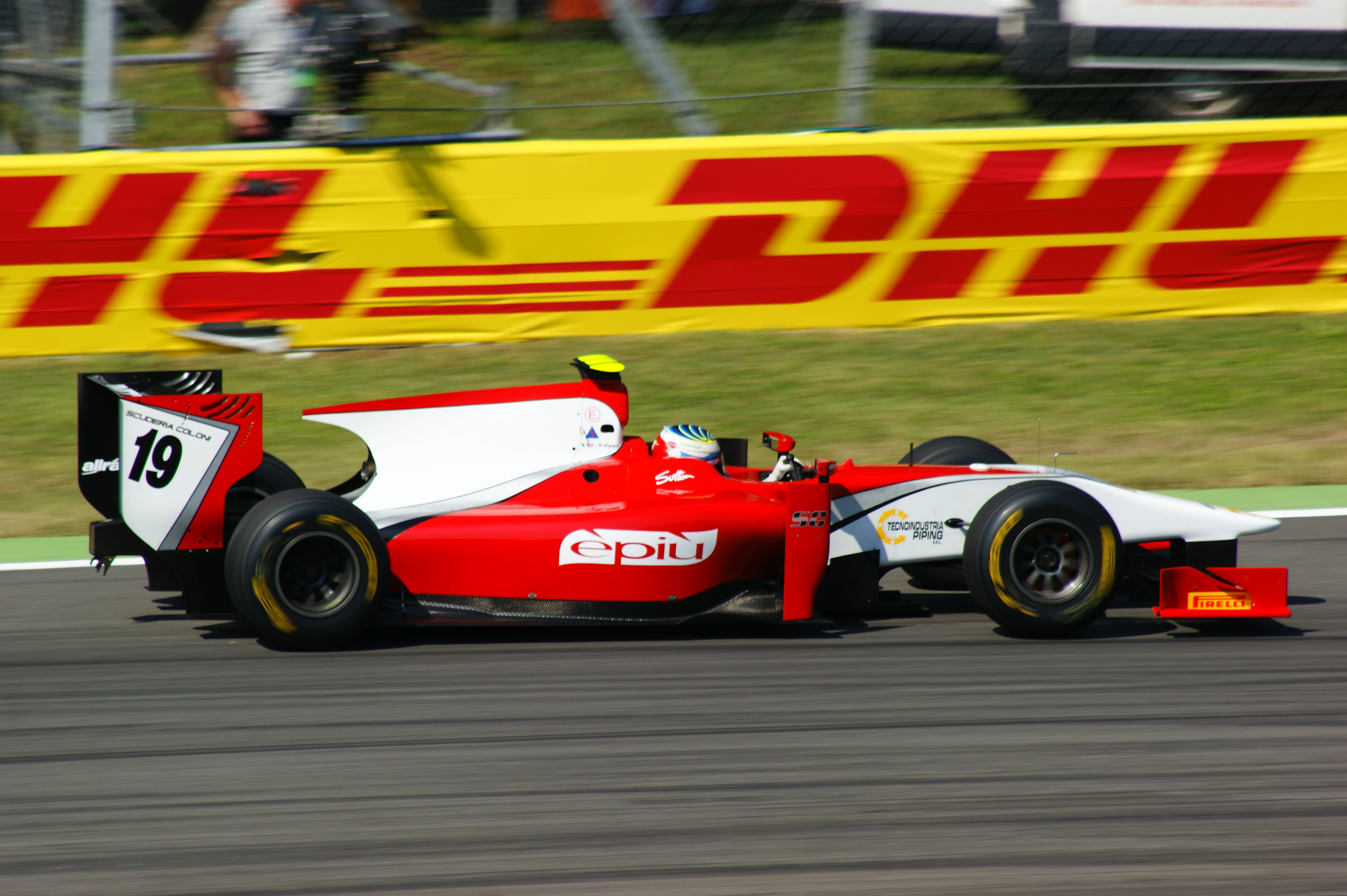
Luca Filippi driving for Coloni at the 2011 Monza GP2 Series round.

In the 2011 season, Coloni initially competed with drivers Michael Herck and Davide Rigon. In the sprint race in Istanbul, the first race of the year, Rigon collided with his competitor Julian Leal. In the accident, Rigon suffered numerous fractures of his fibula, which will mean he will not be able to race for several months.[4] Rigon was replaced for the following races by Kevin Ceccon, who was only 17 years old. The first races of the year were unsuccessful. Halfway through the season, Coloni was only able to record one championship point (obtained by Herck in the sprint race in Spain). This put it in second-to-last place in the team rankings.

The situation improved when Coloni replaced Ceccon with the Italian veteran Luca Filippi for the race at the Nürburgring in July. Filippi won the main race in his first outing for Coloni and finished the sprint in third place. Filippi won again in the final race in Monza; He also won the sprint race in Belgium. Overall, Filippi was runner-up behind Romain Grosjean with 44 points; Herck finished 21st with two points. Coloni ended the 2011 European season in seventh place in the team rankings.

=== Departure from GP2 ===
At the Silverstone round of the 2012 GP2 championship, series organisers and Scuderia Coloni announced that the team would leave the series at the end of the 2012 season, and that the team would forfeit all of their points they had received to date and would receive for the remainder of the season. No further explanation was given for their abrupt departure.

== Auto GP ==
Along with the FMS entry in Auto GP, Scuderia Coloni itself also entered the series in 2015, under the Paolo Coloni Racing name. Swiss Ex-Zele Racing driver Christof von Grünigen was signed to the team, and later joined by Italian Loris Spinelli.

== Results ==
=== Complete Formula One results ===
(key)

Year	Chassis	Engines	Tyres	Drivers	1	2	3	4	5	6	7	8	9	10	11	12	13	14	15	16	Points	WCC
1987	FC187	Ford Cosworth DFZ 3.5 V8	G		BRA	SMR	BEL	MON	DET	FRA	GBR	GER	HUN	AUT	ITA	POR	ESP	MEX	JPN	AUS	0	NC
1987	FC187	Ford Cosworth DFZ 3.5 V8	G	(Italy) Nicola Larini											DNQ		Ret				0	NC
1988	FC188; FC188B	Ford Cosworth DFZ 3.5 V8	G		BRA	SMR	MON	MEX	CAN	DET	FRA	GBR	GER	HUN	BEL	ITA	POR	ESP	JPN	AUS	0	NC
1988	FC188; FC188B	Ford Cosworth DFZ 3.5 V8	G	(Italy) Gabriele Tarquini	Ret	Ret	Ret	14	8	DNPQ	DNPQ	DNPQ	DNPQ	13	Ret	DNQ	11	DNPQ	DNPQ	DNQ	0	NC
1989	FC188B; C3	Ford Cosworth DFR 3.5 V8	P		BRA	SMR	MON	MEX	USA	CAN	FRA	GBR	GER	HUN	BEL	ITA	POR	ESP	JPN	AUS	0	NC
1989	FC188B; C3	Ford Cosworth DFR 3.5 V8	P	(Brazil) Roberto Moreno	DNQ	DNQ	Ret	DNQ	DNQ	Ret	DNQ	Ret	DNPQ	DNPQ	DNPQ	DNPQ	Ret	DNPQ	DNPQ	DNPQ	0	NC
1989	FC188B; C3	Ford Cosworth DFR 3.5 V8	P	(France) Pierre-Henri Raphanel	DNPQ	DNPQ	Ret	DNPQ	DNPQ	DNPQ	DNPQ	DNPQ	DNPQ	DNPQ							0	NC
1989	FC188B; C3	Ford Cosworth DFR 3.5 V8	P	(Italy) Enrico Bertaggia											DNPQ	DNPQ	DNPQ	DNPQ	DNPQ	DNPQ	0	NC
1990	C3B	Subaru 1235 3.5 F12	G		USA	BRA	SMR	MON	CAN	MEX	FRA	GBR	GER	HUN	BEL	ITA	POR	ESP	JPN	AUS	0	NC
1990	C3B	Subaru 1235 3.5 F12	G	(Belgium) Bertrand Gachot	DNPQ	DNPQ	DNPQ	DNPQ	DNPQ	DNPQ	DNPQ	DNPQ									0	NC
1990	C3C	Ford Cosworth DFR 3.5 V8	G	(Belgium) Bertrand Gachot									DNPQ	DNPQ	DNQ	DNQ	DNQ	DNQ	DNQ	DNQ	0	NC
1991	C4	Ford Cosworth DFR 3.5 V8	G		USA	BRA	SMR	MON	CAN	MEX	FRA	GBR	GER	HUN	BEL	ITA	POR	ESP	JPN	AUS	0	NC
1991	C4	Ford Cosworth DFR 3.5 V8	G	(Portugal) Pedro Chaves	DNPQ	DNPQ	DNPQ	DNPQ	DNPQ	DNPQ	DNPQ	DNPQ	DNPQ	DNPQ	DNPQ	DNPQ	DNPQ				0	NC
1991	C4	Ford Cosworth DFR 3.5 V8	G	(Japan) Naoki Hattori															DNPQ	DNPQ	0	NC

=== GP2 Series ===
Year	Team	Chassis	Engine	Tyres	Drivers	Races	Wins	Poles	F.L.	Points	D.C.	T.C.
2005	(Italy) Coloni Motorsport	Dallara; GP2/05	Mecachrome; V8108 V8	B	(Austria) Mathias Lauda	23	0	0	0	3	21st	9th
2005	(Italy) Coloni Motorsport	Dallara; GP2/05	Mecachrome; V8108 V8	B	(Italy) Gianmaria Bruni	17	1	0	0	35†	10th	9th
2005	(Italy) Coloni Motorsport	Dallara; GP2/05	Mecachrome; V8108 V8	B	(Finland) Toni Vilander	4	0	0	0	0	25th	9th
2005	(Italy) Coloni Motorsport	Dallara; GP2/05	Mecachrome; V8108 V8	B	(Italy) Ferdinando Monfardini	2	0	0	0	5†	17th	9th
2006 – 2009: "Coloni" did not compete.
2010	(Italy) Scuderia Coloni	Dallara; GP2/08	Mecachrome; V8108 V8	B	(Brazil) Alberto Valerio	14	0	0	0	4	22nd	10th
2010	(Italy) Scuderia Coloni	Dallara; GP2/08	Mecachrome; V8108 V8	B	(Portugal) Álvaro Parente	4	0	0	1	13	15th	10th
2010	(Italy) Scuderia Coloni	Dallara; GP2/08	Mecachrome; V8108 V8	B	(United Kingdom) James Jakes	2	0	0	0	0	31st	10th
2010	(Italy) Scuderia Coloni	Dallara; GP2/08	Mecachrome; V8108 V8	B	(Bulgaria) Vladimir Arabadzhiev	16	0	0	0	0	29th	10th
2010	(Italy) Scuderia Coloni	Dallara; GP2/08	Mecachrome; V8108 V8	B	(New Zealand) Brendon Hartley	4	0	0	0	1	27th	10th
2011	(Italy) Scuderia Coloni	Dallara; GP2/11	Mecachrome; V8108 V8	P	(Romania) Michael Herck	18	0	0	0	1	21st	7th
2011	(Italy) Scuderia Coloni	Dallara; GP2/11	Mecachrome; V8108 V8	P	(Italy) Davide Rigon	2	0	0	0	0	29th	7th
2011	(Italy) Scuderia Coloni	Dallara; GP2/11	Mecachrome; V8108 V8	P	(Italy) Kevin Ceccon	8	0	0	0	0	30th	7th
2011	(Italy) Scuderia Coloni	Dallara; GP2/11	Mecachrome; V8108 V8	P	(Italy) Luca Filippi	8	3	0	5	54†	**2nd**	7th
2012	(Italy) Scuderia Coloni	Dallara; GP2/11	Mecachrome; V8108 V8	P	(Monaco) Stefano Coletti	20	0	0	1	28	13th†	EX
2012	(Italy) Scuderia Coloni	Dallara; GP2/11	Mecachrome; V8108 V8	P	(Italy) Luca Filippi	4	1	1	0	29	15th	EX
2012	(Italy) Scuderia Coloni	Dallara; GP2/11	Mecachrome; V8108 V8	P	(Italy) Fabio Onidi	24	0	0	0	13	20th	EX

† Includes points scored for other teams.

=== In detail ===
(key) (Races in bold indicate pole position) (Races in italics indicate fastest lap)

Year	Chassis Engine Tyres	Drivers	1	2	3	4	5	6	7	8	9	10	11	12	13	14	15	16	17	18	19	20	21	22	23	24	T.C.	Points
2005	GP2/05; Renault; **B**		SMR; FEA	SMR; SPR	CAT; FEA	CAT; SPR	MON; FEA	NÜR; FEA	NÜR; SPR	MAG; FEA	MAG; SPR	SIL; FEA	SIL; SPR	HOC; FEA	HOC; SPR	HUN; FEA	HUN; SPR	IST; FEA	IST; SPR	MNZ; FEA	MNZ; SPR	SPA; FEA	SPA; SPR	BHR; FEA	BHR; SPR		8th	36
2005	GP2/05; Renault; **B**	(Austria) Mathias Lauda	12	Ret	Ret	13	6	10	Ret	16	15	20	15	14	21	Ret	14	16	18	13	12	9	24^{†}	14	21		8th	36
2005	GP2/05; Renault; **B**	(Italy) Gianmaria Bruni	4	4	1	Ret	2	8	Ret	18	11	7	11	NC	14	10	8	Ret	9								8th	36
2005	GP2/05; Renault; **B**	(Finland) Toni Vilander																		15	8	14	13				8th	36
2005	GP2/05; Renault; **B**	(Italy) Ferdinando Monfardini																						Ret	11		8th	36
2006 – 2009: "Coloni" did not compete.
2010	GP2/08; Renault; **B**		CAT; FEA	CAT; SPR	MON; FEA	MON; SPR	IST; FEA	IST; SPR	VAL; FEA	VAL; SPR	SIL; FEA	SIL; SPR	HOC; FEA	HOC; SPR	HUN; FEA	HUN; SPR	SPA; FEA	SPA; SPR	MNZ; FEA	MNZ; SPR	YMC; FEA	YMC; SPR					10th	18
2010	GP2/08; Renault; **B**	(Brazil) Alberto Valerio	14	Ret	5	Ret	17^{†}	19	9	Ret	14	22	11	12	Ret	12											10th	18
2010	GP2/08; Renault; **B**	(Portugal) Alvaro Parente															2	3	12	9							10th	18
2010	GP2/08; Renault; **B**	(United Kingdom) James Jakes																			15	18					10th	18
2010	GP2/08; Renault; **B**	(Bulgaria) Vladimir Arabadzhiev	19	20	Ret	13	Ret	Ret	13^{†}	9	21	17	15	15	18	14	19	Ret									10th	18
2010	GP2/08; Renault; **B**	(New Zealand) Brendon Hartley																	Ret	Ret	9	6					10th	18
2011	GP2/11; Mecachrome; **P**		IST; FEA	IST; SPR	CAT; FEA	CAT; SPR	MON; FEA	MON; SPR	VAL; FEA	VAL; SPR	SIL; FEA	SIL; SPR	NÜR; FEA	NÜR; SPR	HUN; FEA	HUN; SPR	SPA; FEA	SPA; SPR	MNZ; FEA	MNZ; SPR							7th	46
2011	GP2/11; Mecachrome; **P**	(Romania) Michael Herck	14	12	Ret	Ret	13	15	10	6	24	18	11	10	12	Ret	16	15	Ret	DNS							7th	46
2011	GP2/11; Mecachrome; **P**	(Italy) Davide Rigon	10	Ret																							7th	46
2011	GP2/11; Mecachrome; **P**	(Italy) Kevin Ceccon			19	15	11	12	18	20^{†}	19	Ret															7th	46
2011	GP2/11; Mecachrome; **P**	(Italy) Luca Filippi											1	3	6	Ret	4	1	1	5							7th	46
2012	GP2/11; Mecachrome; **P**		SEP; FEA	SEP; SPR	BHR1; FEA	BHR1; SPR	BHR2; FEA	BHR2; SPR	CAT; FEA	CAT; SPR	MON; FEA	MON; SPR	VAL; FEA	VAL; SPR	SIL; FEA	SIL; SPR	HOC; FEA	HOC; SPR	HUN; FEA	HUN; SPR	SPA; FEA	SPA; SPR	MNZ; FEA	MNZ; SPR	MRN; FEA	MRN; SPR	EX	0
2012	GP2/11; Mecachrome; **P**	(Monaco) Stefano Coletti	5	23^{†}	Ret	23^{†}	21	18	3	8	10	Ret	9	Ret	Ret	Ret	20	19	10	9	20^{†}	8					EX	0
2012	GP2/11; Mecachrome; **P**	(Italy) Luca Filippi																					1	22	**Ret**	DNS	EX	0
2012	GP2/11; Mecachrome; **P**	(Italy) Fabio Onidi	20	13	8	14	20	9	6	18	Ret	Ret	13	17	22	8	19	22	11	24	16	12	21	Ret	Ret	20	EX	0

=== GP2 Final ===
(key) (Races in bold indicate pole position) (Races in italics indicate fastest lap)

Year	Chassis Engine Tyres	Drivers	1	2	T.C.	Points
2011	GP2/11; Mecachrome; **P**		YMC; FEA	YMC; SPR	6th	5
2011	GP2/11; Mecachrome; **P**	(Italy) Kevin Ceccon	5	6	6th	5
2011	GP2/11; Mecachrome; **P**	(Monaco) Stefano Coletti	10	25^{†}	6th	5

=== GP2 Asia Series ===
(key) (Races in bold indicate pole position) (Races in italics indicate fastest lap)

Year	Chassis Engine Tyres	Drivers	1	2	3	4	5	6	7	8	T.C.	Points
2009–10	GP2/05; Renault; **B**		YMC1; FEA	YMC1; SPR	YMC2; FEA	YMC2; SPR	BHR1; FEA	BHR1; SPR	BHR2; FEA	BHR2; SPR	8th	12
2009–10	GP2/05; Renault; **B**	(Spain) Roldán Rodríguez	10	14							8th	12
2009–10	GP2/05; Renault; **B**	(Brazil) Alberto Valerio			15	18					8th	12
2009–10	GP2/05; Renault; **B**	(Portugal) Álvaro Parente					6	Ret	4	3	8th	12
2009–10	GP2/05; Renault; **B**	(United Kingdom) Will Bratt	12	Ret	11	21†	16	Ret	15	16	8th	12
2011	GP2/11; Mecachrome; **P**		YMC; FEA	YMC; SPR	IMO; FEA	IMO; SPR					8th	9
2011	GP2/11; Mecachrome; **P**	(Romania) Michael Herck	13	5	4	5					8th	9
2011	GP2/11; Mecachrome; **P**	(United Kingdom) James Jakes	17†	13							8th	9
2011	GP2/11; Mecachrome; **P**	(Italy) Luca Filippi			22	10					8th	9
