= Enzo Coloni =

Italian racing driver and team owner (born 1946)

- Nationality: Italian
- Born: 17 October 1946 (age 80) Tuoro sul Trasimeno, Italy

Championship titles
- 1982: Italian Formula Three

Enzo Coloni (born 17 October 1946) is an Italian former racing driver and owner of the Scuderia Coloni racing team. His son Paolo Coloni is also a racing driver.

== Career ==
Coloni began his international motor racing career in 1974 with a guest appearance in Formula Italia, where he scored one win. A year later in the same series, he was fourth. In later years, he also appeared in the Italian Formula 3, Italian Formula Ford Super 2000, European Formula 3, Italian Formula 2000, European Formula 2 and the Monaco Grand Prix. The Italian competed in European Formula 2 in 1980 and 1983. However, he failed to score points in any of the two races he entered.

In 1987, Coloni founded his own racing team, Coloni, building Formula 1 cars and competing in Formula 3000, GP2 Series, Formula 3 and other lower series.
