= 1990 United States Grand Prix =

Coordinates: 33°26′52.5″N 112°4′28.5″W

- Race 1 of 16 in the 1990 Formula One World Championship

Race details
- Date: March 11, 1990
- Official name: XXVII Iceberg United States Grand Prix
- Location: Phoenix Street Circuit; Phoenix, Arizona
- Course: Temporary street circuit
- Course length: 3.800 km (2.361 miles)
- Distance: 72 laps, 273.60 km (169.992 miles)
- Weather: Cloudy and cool with temperatures reaching up to 18 °C (64 °F)
- Attendance: 10,000-15,000

Pole position
Driver	(Austria) Gerhard Berger	McLaren-Honda
- Time: 1:28.664

Fastest lap
Driver	(Austria) Gerhard Berger	McLaren-Honda
- Time: 1:31.050 on lap 34

Podium
First	(Brazil) Ayrton Senna	McLaren-Honda
Second	(France) Jean Alesi	Tyrrell-Ford
Third	(Belgium) Thierry Boutsen	Williams-Renault

The 1990 United States Grand Prix was the opening motor race of the 1990 Formula One World Championship held on March 11, 1990, in Phoenix, Arizona. It was the 32nd United States Grand Prix since the American Grand Prize was first held in 1908, and the 25th under Formula One regulations since the first United States Grand Prix was held at Sebring, Florida in 1959. It was the second to be held on the Phoenix Street Circuit and ran over 72 laps of the 3.800 km (2.361 mi) circuit.

The race was won by Brazilian Ayrton Senna, driving a McLaren MP4/5B by eight seconds over French driver Jean Alesi in his comparatively under-funded Tyrrell 018.

It was Alesi's first podium finish, with Belgian driver Thierry Boutsen in a Williams FW13B coming home third.

== Background ==
The United States Grand Prix in the dry desert city of Phoenix was moved to the start of the season in March to avoid the intense 100+ °F heat the city experiences in summer, although the previous year's race was run in June because it was given at such short notice. Swiss driver Gregor Foitek made his Formula One race debut for the Brabham team. He had attempted to qualify for races during the 1989 season, failing to make the grid in eleven qualifying attempts for EuroBrun and one for Rial.

== Qualifying ==
=== Pre-qualifying report ===
Several teams were required to participate in the Friday morning pre-qualifying sessions during 1990, in order to reduce the field to thirty cars for the main qualifying sessions on Friday afternoon and Saturday. At the midway point of the season, the pre-qualifying group was to be reassessed, with the more successful, points-scoring teams being allowed to avoid pre-qualifying, and unsuccessful teams being required to pre-qualify from mid-season onwards.

Nine cars were required to take part in pre-qualifying sessions during the first half of the 1990 season, reduced from thirteen at the end of the 1989 season. The disappearance of the Zakspeed and Rial teams reduced the numbers, as did the reduction of the Osella and Coloni teams from two cars each to one car each. In contrast, EuroBrun expanded from one car to two, and were joined by the only new team on the entry lists, Life Racing Engines, who ran a single car. The fastest four cars would go through to the main qualifying sessions.

The Larrousse team again fielded Lola-Lamborghinis, driven by Éric Bernard and ex-Zakspeed driver Aguri Suzuki, both of whom had driven odd races for the team before. AGS continued with Yannick Dalmas and Gabriele Tarquini, while EuroBrun hired ex-Coloni driver Roberto Moreno and newcomer Claudio Langes. Coloni brought in ex-Rial and Onyx driver Bertrand Gachot to drive the C3B with its new Subaru-badged engine, while the sole Osella FA1M was to be driven by ex-Ligier man Olivier Grouillard. The new team, Life, hired another Grand Prix newcomer, Gary Brabham to drive their L190 car with its unusual W12 engine. The chassis had initially been built for the previous season by the First Racing team, which ultimately did not take part in Formula One.

During the pre-qualifying session on Friday morning, Moreno was fastest by four tenths of a second in his EuroBrun ER189B, already a great improvement over their form during 1989, despite the car being overweight. The Larrousse-Lola LC89Bs of Bernard and Suzuki were second and fourth, this marking the first pre-qualification for Suzuki after failing at every event for Zakspeed last season. Sandwiched between the Lolas in third was Grouillard in the Osella.

The unsuccessful runners included Tarquini and Dalmas in the two AGS JH24 cars, two seconds behind Suzuki, and debutant Langes in the second EuroBrun, a couple of seconds adrift of Dalmas. The other two cars struggled, as Brabham in the Life suffered electrical failure after four laps, the team having been unable to sufficiently test their new car and engine; while Gachot's Coloni broke a gear selector rod on its first lap.

=== Pre-qualifying classification ===
Pos	No	Driver	Constructor	Time	Gap
1	33	(Brazil) Roberto Moreno	EuroBrun-Judd	1:32.292	
2	29	(France) Éric Bernard	Lola-Lamborghini	1:32.711	+0.419
3	14	(France) Olivier Grouillard	Osella-Ford	1:33.181	+0.889
4	30	(Japan) Aguri Suzuki	Lola-Lamborghini	1:33.331	+1.039
5	17	(Italy) Gabriele Tarquini	AGS-Ford	1:35.420	+3.128
6	18	(France) Yannick Dalmas	AGS-Ford	1:35.481	+3.189
7	34	(Italy) Claudio Langes	EuroBrun-Judd	1:37.399	+5.107
8	39	(Australia) Gary Brabham	Life	2:07.147	+35.855
9	31	(Belgium) Bertrand Gachot	Coloni-Subaru	5:15.010	+3:43.718

=== Qualifying report ===
Unexpected rain on Saturday meant that the grid was decided entirely by times from Friday's session. Pirelli's soft qualifying tires caught Goodyear off guard, and the Italian manufacturer put five of its teams in the top ten positions, including Jean Alesi, who was fourth in a Tyrrell. In a surprise move, team manager Ken Tyrrell had signed with Pirelli two days before the race, after 18 years with Goodyear. Gerhard Berger's pole-winning McLaren was the only car in the first two rows sporting Goodyears. Pierluigi Martini put Minardi on the front row for the only time in the team's history, less than seven-hundredths off Berger's pole time. In addition, Andrea de Cesaris (Scuderia Italia), Olivier Grouillard (Osella) and Roberto Moreno (EuroBrun) all scored what proved to be their team's best grid position of the year. Ayrton Senna could only manage fifth, while Alain Prost, in his first race for Ferrari, was seventh. Philippe Alliot was excluded when a mechanic worked on the car outside of the pit area during Friday's practice.

=== Qualifying classification ===
Pos	No	Driver	Constructor	Q1	Q2	Gap
1	28	(Austria) Gerhard Berger	McLaren-Honda	1:28.664	1:53.486	
2	23	(Italy) Pierluigi Martini	Minardi-Ford	1:28.731	2:33.083	+0.067
3	22	(Italy) Andrea de Cesaris	Dallara-Ford	1:29.019	1:57.435	+0.355
4	4	(France) Jean Alesi	Tyrrell-Ford	1:29.408	1:54.738	+0.744
5	27	(Brazil) Ayrton Senna	McLaren-Honda	1:29.431	1:52.015	+0.767
6	20	(Brazil) Nelson Piquet	Benetton-Ford	1:29.862	1:55.449	+1.198
7	1	(France) Alain Prost	Ferrari	1:29.910	1:56.661	+1.246
8	14	(France) Olivier Grouillard	Osella-Ford	1:29.947	—	+1.283
9	5	(Belgium) Thierry Boutsen	Williams-Renault	1:30.059	1:52.771	+1.395
10	8	(Italy) Stefano Modena	Brabham-Judd	1:30.127	—	+1.463
11	3	(Japan) Satoru Nakajima	Tyrrell-Ford	1:30.130	—	+1.466
12	6	(Italy) Riccardo Patrese	Williams-Renault	1:30.213	1:53.530	+1.549
13	25	(Italy) Nicola Larini	Ligier-Ford	1:30.424	—	+1.760
14	24	(Italy) Paolo Barilla	Minardi-Ford	1:31.194	—	+2.530
15	29	(France) Éric Bernard	Lola-Lamborghini	1:31.226	—	+2.562
16	33	(Brazil) Roberto Moreno	EuroBrun-Judd	1:31.247	1:51.538	+2.583
17	2	(United Kingdom) Nigel Mansell	Ferrari	1:31.363	1:52.405	+2.699
18	30	(Japan) Aguri Suzuki	Lola-Lamborghini	1:31.414	—	+2.750
19	12	(United Kingdom) Martin Donnelly	Lotus-Lamborghini	1:31.650	1:49.942	+2.986
20	10	(Germany) Bernd Schneider	Arrows-Ford	1:31.892	—	+3.228
21	9	(Italy) Michele Alboreto	Arrows-Ford	1:31.948	1:54.499	+3.284
22	19	(Italy) Alessandro Nannini	Benetton-Ford	1:31.984	—	+3.320
23	7	(Switzerland) Gregor Foitek	Brabham-Judd	1:32.398	—	+3.734
24	11	(United Kingdom) Derek Warwick	Lotus-Lamborghini	1:32.400	2:05.974	+3.736
25	15	(Brazil) Maurício Gugelmin	Leyton House-Judd	1:32.904	—	+4.240
26	16	(Italy) Ivan Capelli	Leyton House-Judd	1:33.044	—	+4.380
27	35	(Sweden) Stefan Johansson	Onyx-Ford	1:33.468	—	+4.804
28	21	(Italy) Gianni Morbidelli	Dallara-Ford	1:34.292	—	+5.628
29	36	(Finland) JJ Lehto	Onyx-Ford	—	—	—
EX	26	(France) Philippe Alliot	Ligier-Ford	1:31.664	—	+3.000

== Race ==
=== Race report ===
Martin Donnelly did not take the dummy grid due to gearbox failure. (Some sources consider this a did not start.)

Race day was cool with a chance of rain. Berger quickly pulled ahead of Martini and moved over in front of him, but Alesi, in only the 8th start of his Formula 1 career, passed them both and outbraked Berger into the first corner. He immediately began pulling away, and led by 2.4 seconds after one lap.

Senna passed de Cesaris for third, and closed on Berger, who was giving up a half second a lap to Alesi. The Brazilian got by his team-mate when, on lap 9, Berger hit a bump under braking, backed into the tire wall and damaged his rear wing. He pitted for a new wing, and later recorded the fastest lap of the race, but eventually retired with a clutch problem.

When Berger spun, Senna was 8.2 seconds behind Alesi. Not knowing whether the Tyrrell's Pirelli tires would last, Senna was reluctant to push too hard early on. After 30 laps, Alesi remained in the lead, but on lap 34, Senna passed him on the inside. The Tyrrell held the outside line on the exit and retook the lead on the next turn. At the same point, one lap later, Senna took the lead again, and this time he held it.

After several attempts to regain the lead, Alesi decided to conserve his tires, and let Senna go. Meanwhile, Nelson Piquet had progressed from sixth on the grid to third by lap 17. Brake trouble caused him to flatspot his tyres, however, and on lap 28 he pitted for new ones. This allowed Thierry Boutsen's Williams through, and though he battled a problem with his engine intermittently cutting out, he maintained third place to the flag. Piquet had to settle for fourth in his first drive for Benetton.

Prost had fallen back to ninth at the start with gearbox problems, and, while he advanced to fourth place by lap 17, his gearbox troubles proved terminal on lap 21. In the other Ferrari, Nigel Mansell retired from fifth on lap 49, when his clutch disintegrated and pierced the oil tank. The engine seized and caught fire, sending Mansell into a spin.

Senna built his lead over Alesi to 28.5 seconds, but backed off slightly when his engine began sounding less than healthy. Stefano Modena and Satoru Nakajima, in a Brabham and the second Tyrrell, respectively, finished the scoring in fifth and sixth places. It was the 21st win of Ayrton Senna's career and the first of six for the season. Alesi's podium finish was the first of his career.

The first two finishers were full of praise for one another after the race. Senna said he knew Alesi had the ingredients to be World Champion, and Alesi gushed, "He is my hero and has been for many years." Other winners in the race were Ken Tyrrell, with two cars in the points; and Pirelli, with three points finishers.

=== Race classification ===
Pos	No	Driver	Constructor	Laps	Time/Retired	Grid	Points
1	27	(Brazil) Ayrton Senna	McLaren-Honda	72	1:52:32.829	5	9
2	4	(France) Jean Alesi	Tyrrell-Ford	72	+ 8.685	4	6
3	5	(Belgium) Thierry Boutsen	Williams-Renault	72	+ 54.080	9	4
4	20	(Brazil) Nelson Piquet	Benetton-Ford	72	+ 1:08.358	6	3
5	8	(Italy) Stefano Modena	Brabham-Judd	72	+ 1:09.503	10	2
6	3	(Japan) Satoru Nakajima	Tyrrell-Ford	71	+ 1 lap	11	1
7	23	(Italy) Pierluigi Martini	Minardi-Ford	71	+ 1 lap	2	
8	29	(France) Éric Bernard	Lola-Lamborghini	71	+ 1 lap	15	
9	6	(Italy) Riccardo Patrese	Williams-Renault	71	+ 1 lap	12	
10	9	(Italy) Michele Alboreto	Arrows-Ford	70	+ 2 laps	21	
11	19	(Italy) Alessandro Nannini	Benetton-Ford	70	+ 2 laps	22	
12	10	(Germany) Bernd Schneider	Arrows-Ford	70	+ 2 laps	20	
13	33	(Brazil) Roberto Moreno	EuroBrun-Judd	67	+ 5 laps	16	
14	15	(Brazil) Maurício Gugelmin	Leyton House-Judd	66	+ 6 laps	25	
Ret	24	(Italy) Paolo Barilla	Minardi-Ford	54	Physical	14	
Ret	30	(Japan) Aguri Suzuki	Lola-Lamborghini	53	Brakes	18	
Ret	2	(United Kingdom) Nigel Mansell	Ferrari	49	Clutch	17	
Ret	28	(Austria) Gerhard Berger	McLaren-Honda	44	Clutch	1	
Ret	7	(Switzerland) Gregor Foitek	Brabham-Judd	39	Accident	23	
Ret	14	(France) Olivier Grouillard	Osella-Ford	39	Collision	8	
Ret	22	(Italy) Andrea de Cesaris	Dallara-Ford	25	Engine	3	
Ret	1	(France) Alain Prost	Ferrari	21	Oil leak	7	
Ret	16	(Italy) Ivan Capelli	Leyton House-Judd	20	Electrical	26	
Ret	11	(United Kingdom) Derek Warwick	Lotus-Lamborghini	6	Gearbox	24	
Ret	25	(Italy) Nicola Larini	Ligier-Ford	4	Throttle	13	
DNS	12	(United Kingdom) Martin Donnelly	Lotus-Lamborghini	0	Gearbox	19	
DNQ	35	(Sweden) Stefan Johansson	Onyx-Ford				
DNQ	21	(Italy) Gianni Morbidelli	Dallara-Ford				
DNQ	36	(Finland) JJ Lehto	Onyx-Ford				
EX	26	(France) Philippe Alliot	Ligier-Ford				
DNPQ	17	(Italy) Gabriele Tarquini	AGS-Ford				
DNPQ	18	(France) Yannick Dalmas	AGS-Ford				
DNPQ	34	(Italy) Claudio Langes	EuroBrun-Judd				
DNPQ	39	(Australia) Gary Brabham	Life				
DNPQ	31	(Belgium) Bertrand Gachot	Coloni-Subaru				

== Championship standings after the race ==
Drivers' Championship standings

Pos	Driver	Points
1	(Brazil) Ayrton Senna	9
2	(France) Jean Alesi	6
3	(Belgium) Thierry Boutsen	4
4	(Brazil) Nelson Piquet	3
5	(Italy) Stefano Modena	2

Constructors' Championship standings

Pos	Constructor	Points
1	(United Kingdom) McLaren-Honda	9
2	(United Kingdom) Tyrrell-Ford	7
3	(United Kingdom) Williams-Renault	4
4	(United Kingdom) Benetton-Ford	3
5	(United Kingdom) Brabham-Judd	2

- Note: Only the top five positions are included for both sets of standings.

Previous race: 1989 Australian Grand Prix	FIA Formula One World Championship; 1990 season	Next race: 1990 Brazilian Grand Prix
Previous race: 1989 United States Grand Prix	United States Grand Prix	Next race: 1991 United States Grand Prix
