= 1990 Canadian Grand Prix =

- Race 5 of 16 in the 1990 Formula One World Championship

Race details
- Date: June 10, 1990
- Official name: XXVIII Grand Prix Molson du Canada
- Location: Circuit Gilles Villeneuve; Montreal, Quebec, Canada
- Course: Partial street circuit
- Course length: 4.390 km (2.728 miles)
- Distance: 70 laps, 307.300 km (190.947 miles)
- Weather: Warm and cloudy with temperatures approaching 19.8 °C (67.6 °F); wind speeds up to 27.8 kilometres per hour (17.3 mph)

Pole position
Driver	(Brazil) Ayrton Senna	McLaren-Honda
- Time: 1:20.399

Fastest lap
Driver	(Austria) Gerhard Berger	McLaren-Honda
- Time: 1:22.077 on lap 70

Podium
First	(Brazil) Ayrton Senna	McLaren-Honda
Second	(Brazil) Nelson Piquet	Benetton-Ford
Third	(United Kingdom) Nigel Mansell	Ferrari

The 1990 Canadian Grand Prix was a Formula One motor race held on 10 June 1990 at Circuit Gilles Villeneuve. It was Race 5 of 16 in the 1990 Formula One World Championship. It was the 28th Canadian Grand Prix and the 12th to be held at the Circuit Gilles Villeneuve. The race was held over 70 laps of the 4.390 km (2.728 mi) circuit for a race distance of 307 kilometres.

The race was won for the second time by Brazilian driver Ayrton Senna driving a McLaren MP4/5B. It was Senna's third win for the season having won the season-opening United States Grand Prix and the Monaco Grand Prix just two weeks earlier. Senna won by ten seconds over fellow Brazilian Nelson Piquet who drove a Benetton B190. Three seconds further back in third was British driver Nigel Mansell driving a Ferrari 641.

The win allowed Senna to gain a twelve-point lead in the drivers' championship over his McLaren teammate Gerhard Berger. His nearest competitive rival, Ferrari driver Alain Prost had less than half of Senna's points.

== Qualifying ==
=== Pre-qualifying report ===
In the Friday morning pre-qualifying session, Roberto Moreno was fastest by over three tenths of a second in the EuroBrun, despite a continued lack of testing. Olivier Grouillard was second fastest in the sole Osella, with the Larrousse-Lolas in third and fourth. For the first time this season, Aguri Suzuki was faster than his team-mate Éric Bernard.

In fifth place, failing to pre-qualify by a hundredth of a second, was Gabriele Tarquini in the AGS, with his team-mate Yannick Dalmas in sixth. It was the fourth double failure to pre-qualify for the French team. The other three entrants were a long way behind: Bertrand Gachot was seventh in the Coloni, nearly 16 seconds slower than Moreno. Claudio Langes had been fired by EuroBrun prior to this event, but had been reinstated; he was eighth fastest, nearly 19 seconds slower than his team-mate Moreno. Slowest again, and nearly 22 seconds off the pace, was Bruno Giacomelli, who managed seven laps in the Life before his engine failed. The team were at this point talking to Brabham and Lotus, hoping to purchase some used Judd CV engines, the same type that EuroBrun were using.

=== Pre-qualifying classification ===
Pos	No	Driver	Constructor	Time	Gap
1	33	(Brazil) Roberto Moreno	EuroBrun-Judd	1:28.268	—
2	14	(France) Olivier Grouillard	Osella-Ford	1:28.589	+0.321
3	30	(Japan) Aguri Suzuki	Lola-Lamborghini	1:29.372	+1.104
4	29	(France) Éric Bernard	Lola-Lamborghini	1:29.844	+1.576
5	17	(Italy) Gabriele Tarquini	AGS-Ford	1:29.855	+1.587
6	18	(France) Yannick Dalmas	AGS-Ford	1:30.460	+2.192
7	31	(Belgium) Bertrand Gachot	Coloni-Subaru	1:44.185	+15.917
8	34	(Italy) Claudio Langes	EuroBrun-Judd	1:47.118	+18.850
9	39	(Italy) Bruno Giacomelli	Life	1:50.253	+21.985

=== Qualifying report ===
The qualifying session on Saturday was wet, therefore Friday's times were used to decide the grid order. Ayrton Senna was fastest in the McLaren, with his team-mate Gerhard Berger alongside him on the front row.

=== Qualifying classification ===
Pos	No	Driver	Constructor	Q1	Q2	Gap
1	27	(Brazil) Ayrton Senna	McLaren-Honda	1:20.399	1:30.514	—
2	28	(Austria) Gerhard Berger	McLaren-Honda	1:20.465	1:33.240	+0.066
3	1	(France) Alain Prost	Ferrari	1:20.826	1:31.514	+0.427
4	19	(Italy) Alessandro Nannini	Benetton-Ford	1:21.302	1:30.575	+0.903
5	20	(Brazil) Nelson Piquet	Benetton-Ford	1:21.568	1:27.124	+1.169
6	5	(Belgium) Thierry Boutsen	Williams-Renault	1:21.599	—	+1.200
7	2	(United Kingdom) Nigel Mansell	Ferrari	1:21.641	1:27.647	+1.242
8	4	(France) Jean Alesi	Tyrrell-Ford	1:21.748	—	+1.349
9	6	(Italy) Riccardo Patrese	Williams-Renault	1:22.018	44:52.525	+1.619
10	8	(Italy) Stefano Modena	Brabham-Judd	1:22.660	1:29.062	+2.261
11	11	(United Kingdom) Derek Warwick	Lotus-Lamborghini	1:22.673	—	+2.274
12	12	(United Kingdom) Martin Donnelly	Lotus-Lamborghini	1:22.703	1:35.198	+2.304
13	3	(Japan) Satoru Nakajima	Tyrrell-Ford	1:23.605	—	+3.205
14	9	(Italy) Michele Alboreto	Arrows-Ford	1:23.744	—	+3.345
15	14	(France) Olivier Grouillard	Osella-Ford	1:23.779	1:30.872	+3.380
16	23	(Italy) Pierluigi Martini	Minardi-Ford	1:23.795	1:40.047	+3.396
17	26	(France) Philippe Alliot	Ligier-Ford	1:23.899	1:31.797	+3.500
18	30	(Japan) Aguri Suzuki	Lola-Lamborghini	1:23.915	1:32.777	+3.516
19	21	(Italy) Emanuele Pirro	Dallara-Ford	1:24.269	1:38.775	+3.870
20	25	(Italy) Nicola Larini	Ligier-Ford	1:24.285	1:30.091	+3.886
21	35	(Switzerland) Gregor Foitek	Onyx-Ford	1:24.397	1:42.487	+3.998
22	36	(Finland) JJ Lehto	Onyx-Ford	1:24.425	1:40.607	+4.026
23	29	(France) Éric Bernard	Lola-Lamborghini	1:24.451	1:32.750	+4.052
24	16	(Italy) Ivan Capelli	Leyton House-Judd	1:24.554	7:00.728	+4.155
25	22	(Italy) Andrea de Cesaris	Dallara-Ford	1:24.621	1:36.629	+4.222
26	10	(Italy) Alex Caffi	Arrows-Ford	1:25.113	1:39.209	+4.714
27	33	(Brazil) Roberto Moreno	EuroBrun-Judd	1:25.172	1:31.097	+4.773
28	15	(Brazil) Maurício Gugelmin	Leyton House-Judd	1:25.712	1:45.435	+5.313
29	24	(Italy) Paolo Barilla	Minardi-Ford	1:25.951	1:51.583	+5.552
30	7	(Australia) David Brabham	Brabham-Judd	1:26.771	1:36.453	+6.372

== Race ==
=== Race report ===
In a race with a McLaren front row, the team looked strong. Senna maintained the lead coming into the first corner with Berger second, but the Austrian was deemed to have jumped the start. A few laps into the race it was announced that Berger would have a one-minute penalty added to his race time. As a consequence, after a round of pitstops for new tyres, Senna allowed his teammate to pass him going into the hairpin so that the Austrian could set about gaining time in relation to his competitors.

The weather conditions were moist, making for a mildly slippery track. This caused spins for many. The first of the spinners was Pierluigi Martini who spun off at turn 2 on the first lap. Thierry Boutsen, the 1989 winner, spun mid-race while trying to pass Prost approaching a corner, and hit the Ligier of Nicola Larini as he spun.

Nannini spun off the track into a tyre wall. Shortly afterwards on lap 26, Jean Alesi lost control while challenging another car and spun into the same tyre barrier, ending up on top of Nannini's abandoned Benetton B190. The Benetton was written off when hit by the Tyrrell, leaving team mechanics with a massive rebuild before the next race in Mexico.

In the end, Berger had crossed the line first but was awarded a one-minute penalty for a jumped start, which was added to his overall race time, dropping him to fourth in the final order. Following Berger's penalty, Senna took the victory, whilst Piquet finished second after a determined battle with the two Ferraris where he forced his way past Prost's Ferrari going into the hairpin. It was the Benetton driver's first podium finish since the 1988 Australian Grand Prix. Prost was later passed at the same place by teammate Mansell who went on to finish third.

=== Race classification ===
Pos	No	Driver	Constructor	Laps	Time/Retired	Grid	Points
1	27	(Brazil) Ayrton Senna	McLaren-Honda	70	1:42:56.400	1	9
2	20	(Brazil) Nelson Piquet	Benetton-Ford	70	+10.497	5	6
3	2	(United Kingdom) Nigel Mansell	Ferrari	70	+13.385	7	4
4	28	(Austria) Gerhard Berger	McLaren-Honda	70	+14.854	2	3
5	1	(France) Alain Prost	Ferrari	70	+15.820	3	2
6	11	(United Kingdom) Derek Warwick	Lotus-Lamborghini	68	+2 laps	11	1
7	8	(Italy) Stefano Modena	Brabham-Judd	68	+2 laps	10	
8	10	(Italy) Alex Caffi	Arrows-Ford	68	+2 laps	26	
9	29	(France) Éric Bernard	Lola-Lamborghini	67	+3 laps	23	
10	16	(Italy) Ivan Capelli	Leyton House-Judd	67	+3 laps	24	
11	3	(Japan) Satoru Nakajima	Tyrrell-Ford	67	+3 laps	13	
12	30	(Japan) Aguri Suzuki	Lola-Lamborghini	66	+4 laps	18	
13	14	(France) Olivier Grouillard	Osella-Ford	65	+5 laps	15	
Ret	12	(United Kingdom) Martin Donnelly	Lotus-Lamborghini	57	Engine	12	
Ret	35	(Switzerland) Gregor Foitek	Onyx-Ford	53	Engine	21	
Ret	22	(Italy) Andrea de Cesaris	Dallara-Ford	50	Gearbox	25	
Ret	36	(Finland) JJ Lehto	Onyx-Ford	46	Engine	22	
Ret	6	(Italy) Riccardo Patrese	Williams-Renault	44	Brakes	9	
Ret	26	(France) Philippe Alliot	Ligier-Ford	34	Engine	17	
Ret	4	(France) Jean Alesi	Tyrrell-Ford	26	Spun off	8	
Ret	19	(Italy) Alessandro Nannini	Benetton-Ford	21	Spun off	4	
Ret	5	(Belgium) Thierry Boutsen	Williams-Renault	19	Collision	6	
Ret	25	(Italy) Nicola Larini	Ligier-Ford	18	Collision	20	
Ret	21	(Italy) Emanuele Pirro	Dallara-Ford	11	Collision	19	
Ret	9	(Italy) Michele Alboreto	Arrows-Ford	11	Collision	14	
Ret	23	(Italy) Pierluigi Martini	Minardi-Ford	0	Spun off	16	
DNQ	33	(Brazil) Roberto Moreno	EuroBrun-Judd				
DNQ	15	(Brazil) Maurício Gugelmin	Leyton House-Judd				
DNQ	24	(Italy) Paolo Barilla	Minardi-Ford				
DNQ	7	(Australia) David Brabham	Brabham-Judd				
DNPQ	17	(Italy) Gabriele Tarquini	AGS-Ford				
DNPQ	18	(France) Yannick Dalmas	AGS-Ford				
DNPQ	31	(Belgium) Bertrand Gachot	Coloni-Subaru				
DNPQ	34	(Italy) Claudio Langes	EuroBrun-Judd				
DNPQ	39	(Italy) Bruno Giacomelli	Life				

== Championship standings after the race ==
Drivers' Championship standings

Pos	Driver	Points
1	(Brazil) Ayrton Senna	31
2	(Austria) Gerhard Berger	19
3	(France) Alain Prost	14
4	(France) Jean Alesi	13
5	(Brazil) Nelson Piquet	12

Constructors' Championship standings

Pos	Constructor	Points
1	(United Kingdom) McLaren-Honda	50
2	(Italy) Ferrari	21
3	(United Kingdom) Williams-Renault	18
4	(United Kingdom) Benetton-Ford	16
5	(United Kingdom) Tyrrell-Ford	14

- Note: Only the top five positions are included for both sets of standings.

Previous race: 1990 Monaco Grand Prix	FIA Formula One World Championship; 1990 season	Next race: 1990 Mexican Grand Prix
Previous race: 1989 Canadian Grand Prix	Canadian Grand Prix	Next race: 1991 Canadian Grand Prix
