= John Barnard (disambiguation) =

John Barnard (born 1946) is an English race car designer.

John Barnard may also refer to:

- John Barnard (music publisher) (fl. 1625–1649), first to publish a collection of English cathedral music
- John Barnard (clergyman) (1681–1770), Congregationalist minister from Massachusetts
- John Barnard (shipbuilder) (1705–1784), English shipbuilder to the Royal Navy
- John Barnard (composer) (born 1948), English church music composer
- John G. Barnard (1815–1882), U.S. Army officer
- John Barnard (cricketer) (1794–1878), English cricketer
- John Barnard (cyclist) (1885–1977), British Olympic cyclist
- John Barnard (politician) (1685–1764), British Whig MP
- John Barnard (biographer) (died 1683), English biographer of Peter Heylyn
- John Barnard (supporter of James II) (1662–?)

== See also ==
- John Bernard (disambiguation)
