= John Bernard =

John Bernard may refer to:

== Politicians ==
- John Bernard (MP for New Shoreham), MP for New Shoreham 1337–1368
- John Bernard (MP for Hythe), MP for Hythe, 1378–1386
- John Bernard (MP for Wallingford), MP for Wallingford, 1388
- John Bernard (Ipswich MP) (died 1421), MP for Ipswich, 1387–1411
- John Bernard (MP for Northampton) (1604–1674), English landowner
- Sir John Bernard, 2nd Baronet (1630–1679), MP for Huntingdon, 1660
- John Bernard (American politician) (1893–1983), U.S. congressman from Minnesota

== Others ==
- John Bernard (author) (died 1554), religious writer
- John Bernard, Count of Lippe (1613–1652)
- John Bernard (bishop) (1860–1927), Anglican Archbishop of Dublin, Irish
- John Barnard (biographer) or Bernard (died 1683), English biographer of Peter Heylyn
- John Peter Bernard (died 1750), Anglo-French biographer
- John Bernard (actor) (1756–1828), English actor and biographer
- John MacKay Bernard (1857–1919), Scottish brewer and meteorologist
- John Bernard (meteorologist), Dutch meteorologist

== See also ==
- John Barnard (disambiguation)
