= John Barnard =

British engineer and car designer (born 1946)

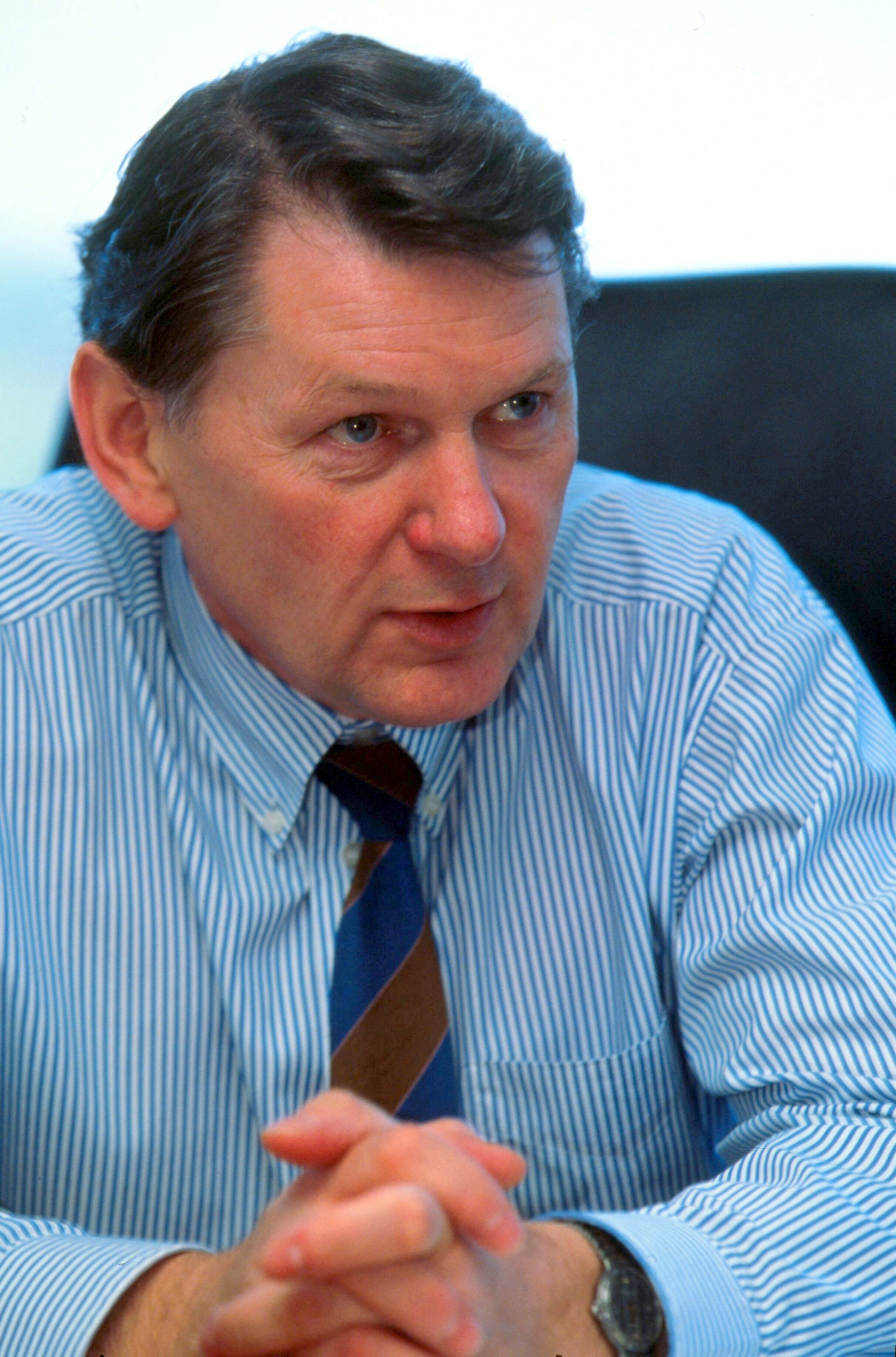
- Born: John Edward Barnard; 4 May 1946 (age 80); Wembley, London, England
- Occupations: Racing car designer, Formula One aerodynamicist, engineer and former technical director.
- Known for: Introducing the first semi-automatic gearbox, the first carbon fibre composite chassis and the "coke bottle" shape of the rear bodywork.

John Edward Barnard, RDI (born 4 May 1946) is an English engineer and racing car designer. Barnard is credited with the introduction of two new designs into Formula One: the carbon fibre composite chassis first seen in 1981 with McLaren, and the semi-automatic gearbox with shift paddles on the steering wheel, which he introduced with Ferrari in 1989.

== Early career ==
Barnard gained a diploma from Watford College of Technology in the 1960s and unlike many of his contemporaries he did not follow a lengthy academic career, instead choosing to join General Electric Company. In 1968, Barnard was recruited by Lola Cars in Huntingdon as a junior designer and began working on many of the chassis manufacturer's projects, including Formula Vee racers and numerous sports cars. While at Lola, Barnard was introduced to Patrick Head, who later helped Frank Williams found the Williams Formula One team. The two engineers became good friends and Head was best man at Barnard's wedding in the early 1970s.

In 1972, Barnard joined the McLaren Formula One team and remained for three years working alongside Gordon Coppuck on the design of the Championship-winning M23 chassis and other McLaren projects, including the team's IndyCar. By 1975, Barnard had been hired by Parnelli Jones to work with Maurice Philippe designing the team's Formula One racer (the Parnelli VPJ4) which campaigned from 1974 to 1976. The cars best finish was 4th by Mario Andretti at the 1975 Swedish Grand Prix. After Philippe left Vel's Parnelli Jones Racing, Barnard modified the design for the Indycar circuit. Further Indycar designs followed and in 1980 the Barnard-designed Chaparral 2K chassis took Johnny Rutherford to the prestigious Indianapolis 500 and the CART drivers title.

=== McLaren era ===
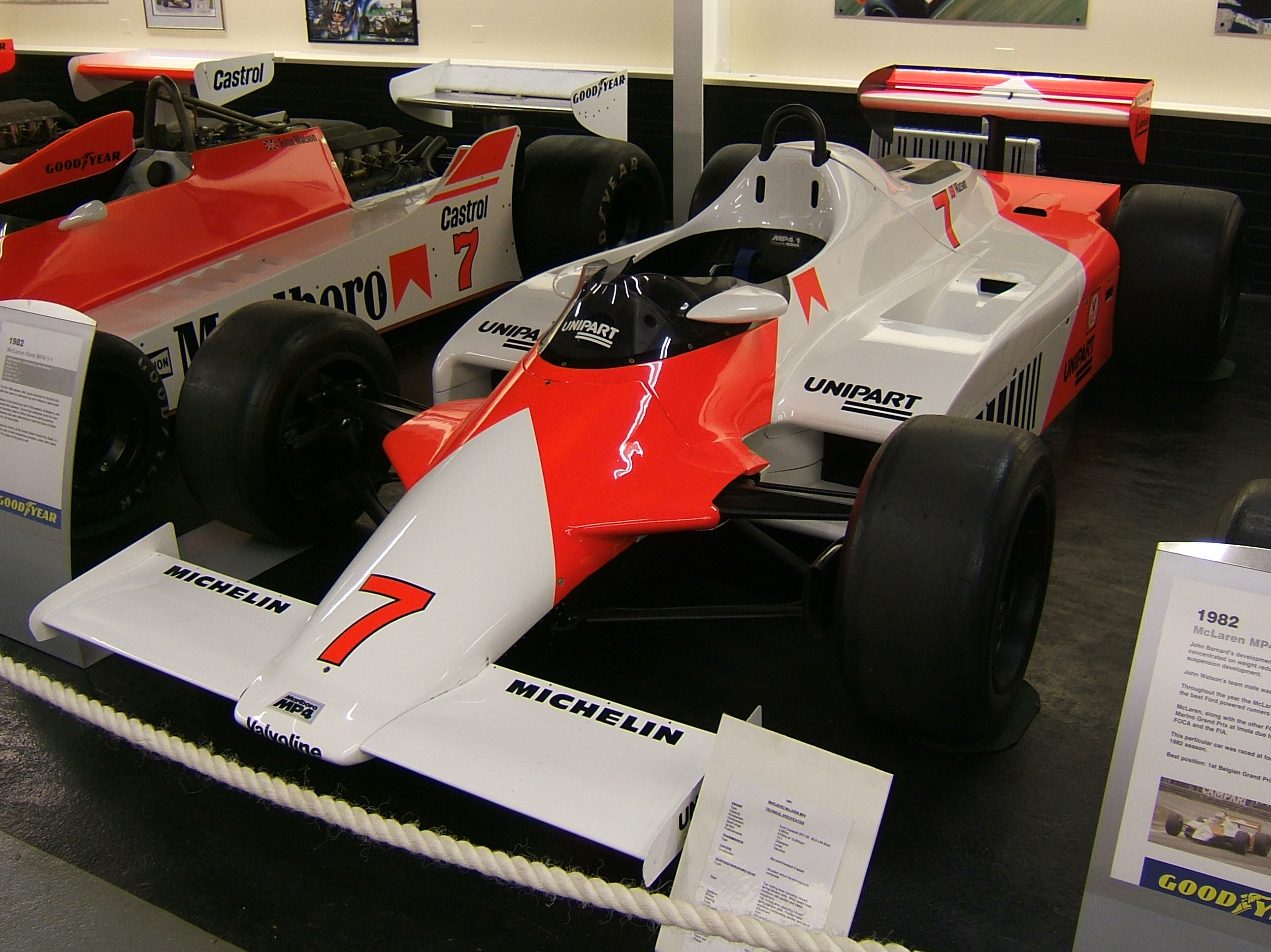
McLaren MP4/1 was the first Formula One car to use the now ubiquitous carbon fibre composite monocoque.

His success in the United States brought Barnard to the attention of new McLaren team boss Ron Dennis, and in 1980 he joined the team and began working on the McLaren MP4 (MP4/1), the first carbon fibre composite chassis in Formula One, alongside the Lotus 88 designed by Colin Chapman. The chassis itself was built by team sponsor Hercules Aerospace in the US, after former Hercules apprentice and then McLaren engineer Steve Nichols had advised Barnard that the US-based company might be their best choice. Barnard, along with Dennis, had been unsuccessfully searching in England for a company willing to take on the job.

The MP4/1 quickly revolutionised car design in Formula One with new levels of rigidity and driver protection. At the 1981 Italian Grand Prix at Monza, the strength of the MP4/1 was given a very public test when John Watson suffered a massive crash in his MP4/1 coming out of the second Lesmo turn. The strength of the carbon fibre monocoque (which many in F1 had been sceptical of) saw Watson emerge unhurt to the surprise of many, not the least being Watson himself and Barnard. Within months the design had been copied by many of McLaren's rivals. In 1983, Barnard pioneered the 'coke-bottle' shape of sidepods still visible to this day.

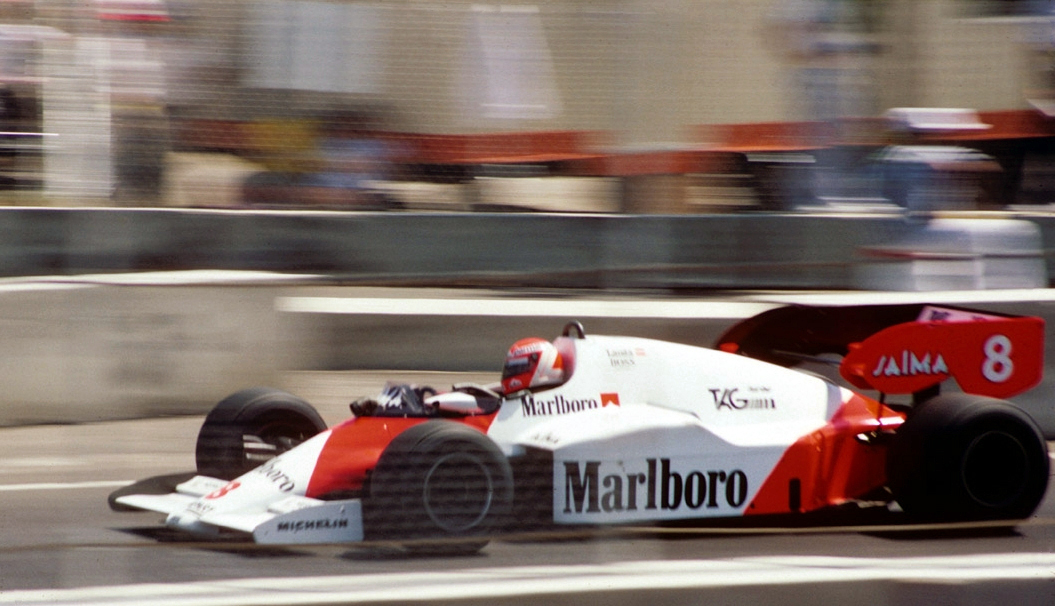
Niki Lauda in the 1984 championship winning McLaren MP4/2

During his time with the team, McLaren became the dominant force within Formula One, taking drivers titles for Niki Lauda in 1984, and Alain Prost in 1985 and 1986, with the first two seasons seeing constructors honours and the team narrowly missing out to Williams in 1986 for a third. The 1984 season also saw McLaren drivers Lauda and Prost win an amazing 12 of 16 races with the TAG-Porsche powered McLaren MP4/2 (Prost won 7, Lauda 5, but Lauda scored in more races and won the championship by only half a point from his teammate). By the time Barnard left McLaren for Ferrari at the end of 1986 his cars had won 31 Grands Prix for the team.

The 80° V6 TAG engine had been financed by Mansour Ojjeh of Techniques d'Avant Garde (TAG) and was built by Porsche to Barnard's specification for the MP4/1E and its highly successful replacement the MP4/2. After debuting in Lauda's new MP4/1E at the 1983 Dutch Grand Prix with approximately 700 bhp (522 kW; 710 PS), power steadily rose until the 1.5-litre turbocharged engine named the TTE PO1 produced around 950 bhp (708 kW; 963 PS) at the end of its life in 1987.

=== Ferrari years ===
By 1986, the working relationship between Barnard and McLaren boss Ron Dennis had deteriorated. This led to speculation that Barnard would leave the team, and it came as no surprise when it was announced before the 1986 German Grand Prix that he would be joining Ferrari in 1987. The Scuderia had not won a Grand Prix since Michele Alboreto had won the 1985 German Grand Prix, and the designer had been able to name his terms. Given a large sum of money by the team to set up a design office in Guildford in England, Barnard founded the Ferrari Guildford Technical Office in early 1988 and began work on returning Ferrari to regular winning (according to Barnard, the name of the Guildford office had been a play on words of one of Ferrari's road cars, the GTO). Gerhard Berger won the last two races of the 1987 season, and followed this by a lucky victory at the Italian Grand Prix in September 1988, in a season of total domination by McLaren, whose Honda-powered MP4/4 had been designed by former colleague Steve Nichols, with some help from Barnard's replacement in the team, long time Brabham designer Gordon Murray. Ferrari finished 4th in the Constructors' Championship in 1987 and 2nd in 1988.

Of the Gustav Brunner designed Ferrari F1/87 and the updated F1/87/88C used in the 1987 and 1988 seasons, Barnard stated that the car had a different design than he would have chosen given the regulations, but that by the time he arrived at the team work had already begun on the cars' construction and little could be done to change things without considerable expense. Also, with 1988 being the last year for turbo powered cars, his main focus was on designing the 1989 car to conform to the FIA's new regulations which required all Formula One cars to use a 3.5-litre naturally aspirated engine.

While at Ferrari, Barnard ruffled a few feathers with his way of doing things. Despite being the team's Technical Director, he alienated himself from the team when he decided to set up his office in England and not at the factory in Maranello as had been the tradition even with non-Italian members of the team (like the team's chief engineer at the time, fellow Briton Harvey Postlethwaite). Barnard reasoned that it would allow more work to be done on designing the 1989 car without the distractions of the factory and the Italian press who had been known to be scathing on any Ferrari failures. He also put a ban on the team's long-standing tradition of having wine at the mechanics' lunch table during testing, something that proved unpopular with the team's mostly Italian mechanics.

In 1989, Barnard pioneered the electronic gear shift mechanism – now known as a semi-automatic gearbox – which was operated via two paddles on the steering wheel. This revolutionary system had proved fragile in testing since early in 1988 and many in F1 were expecting it to fail. However, new team recruit Nigel Mansell took the new V12-powered Ferrari 640 to victory first time out at the Brazilian Grand Prix in Rio de Janeiro. Barnard had instigated his second technical revolution, and by 1995 every team was running a copy of the Ferrari gearbox. This would unfortunately be the only finish recorded by either Mansell or Berger until Round 7 when Mansell finished second in the French Grand Prix at Paul Ricard. The new gearbox had been the cause of many DNF's for the team but by the time they got to France the problems had been solved (not enough power from the battery that powered the electronic gearbox) and the semi-automatic gearbox started to show its advantages.

One such advantage of the new system was put to good use by Gerhard Berger after he suffered a fiery high speed crash at the San Marino Grand Prix. His car hit the wall at the Tamburello curve at close to 180 mph (290 km/h) and with an almost full fuel load burst into flames, leaving the Austrian (who was knocked unconscious) with burns on his hands. His injuries kept him out of the next race in Monaco, and would normally have kept him out for longer, but being able to make gear changes without his hands leaving the steering wheel he was able to return in Mexico, just two races after his crash. Berger and team boss Cesare Fiorio told the press in Mexico that had the Ferrari not been equipped with Barnard's revolutionary gearbox, Berger's injuries would not have allowed him to return to racing so soon.

Following Mansell's second place in France and the car's newfound reliability, results improved dramatically. Podium places were intermixed with Mansell winning the Hungarian Grand Prix, and Berger winning in Portugal. After only scoring 21 points in the first half of the season (all to Mansell), the John Barnard designed 640 rose to the occasion and scored 39 in the second half (21 of them to Berger who scored his first finish of the year with a second place at Monza), giving the team 3rd place behind McLaren and Williams in the Constructors' Championship.

== 1990s ==
For 1990 Frenchman Alain Prost was signed in an effective swap, sending Ferrari favourite Gerhard Berger to McLaren. Despite his friendship and good past working relationship with Prost at McLaren, Barnard opted to leave the Maranello based team and join Benetton. Seeking a new challenge, and relishing working again for a team based in England, he would be free from the Italian press, where the numerous failures during testing of the semi-automatic gearbox in 1988 had often made headlines, despite being minor.

=== Move to Benetton ===
As the team's new Technical Director, Barnard assisted chief designer Rory Byrne with Benetton's 1990 challenger, the Ford V8 powered Benetton B190, which debuted at the 1990 San Marino Grand Prix, and late in the season took 2 wins in the hands of triple World Champion Nelson Piquet, which were the last 2 races of the season in Japan and Australia (the Australian Grand Prix was also the 500th World Championship Grand Prix held since the championship had started in 1950).

Barnard also helped design the Benetton B191 for the 1991 season, assisted by the team's new designer Mike Coughlan. The B191, which was the first Benetton to use the raised anhedral front profile pioneered by the Tyrrell team in 1990 (the Tyrrell 019 was designed by Harvey Postlethwaite) and has since become standard on nearly all open wheel racing cars, carried Piquet to his 23rd and final Grand Prix win in Canada. After completing the Benetton B192 for the 1992 season (with assistance from Rory Byrne and Ross Brawn), in which future 7 time World Champion Michael Schumacher would take his first ever Grand Prix win in Belgium, Barnard left Benetton after a dispute with team boss Flavio Briatore over money.

=== Return to Ferrari ===
After working for a short time on the stillborn Toyota F1 project, in mid-1993, Barnard returned to Ferrari, who were once more in a slump, having failed to win a single race since 1990. Once more Barnard was able to name his terms and opened a new technical office in Surrey named Ferrari Design and Development (FDD). From his UK office Barnard began work on the 412T1B which ultimately returned Ferrari to the top of the podium at the hands of old team favourite Gerhard Berger.

Barnard continued to design Ferrari's Formula One racers for four seasons, including the 412T2; which took Jean Alesi to his only race win. By 1996 however major changes were underway at the Italian team. With Berger and Alesi removed, and reigning world champion Michael Schumacher installed as lead driver, team manager Jean Todt set about building a design office in Maranello. Unwilling to re-locate to Italy, Barnard's 1997 F310B was to be his last design when Todt appointed South African Rory Byrne as Chief Designer and Englishman Ross Brawn as Technical Director. In the summer of 1997 FDD was purchased from Ferrari and became B3 Technologies ending Barnard's association with Ferrari. Although no longer part of the team, the designer's F310B chassis took Michael Schumacher tantalisingly close to the title and his victory at the Japanese Grand Prix was to be the last for a Barnard car.

=== Arrows and Prost ===
In 1998, B3 Technologies began working for the Arrows Formula One team, but the deal soon descended into dispute when the Prost team also subcontracted the R&D outfit. The Arrows A19 scored the last points for a fully Barnard-designed car when Pedro Diniz placed fifth in the chaotic and rain-soaked 1998 Belgian Grand Prix. Ultimately, Barnard worked as a technical consultant for the Prost team until its demise in 2001 when he chose to move into motorcycle racing, becoming Technical Director of the Team KR Grand Prix motorcycle racing team.

=== After racing ===
On 29 February 2008, Barnard sold his company, B3 Technologies to 3 people, one of whom had previously worked for him, and moved into furniture design with leading designer Terence Woodgate. B3 Technologies was put into administration in late 2008.

In 2018, Barnard's biography The Perfect Car was published by writer Nick Skeens, with the close co-operation of Barnard and input from many of his associates, drivers and rivals.
