= Benetton B191 =

Formula One racing car

Benetton B191 Benetton B191B
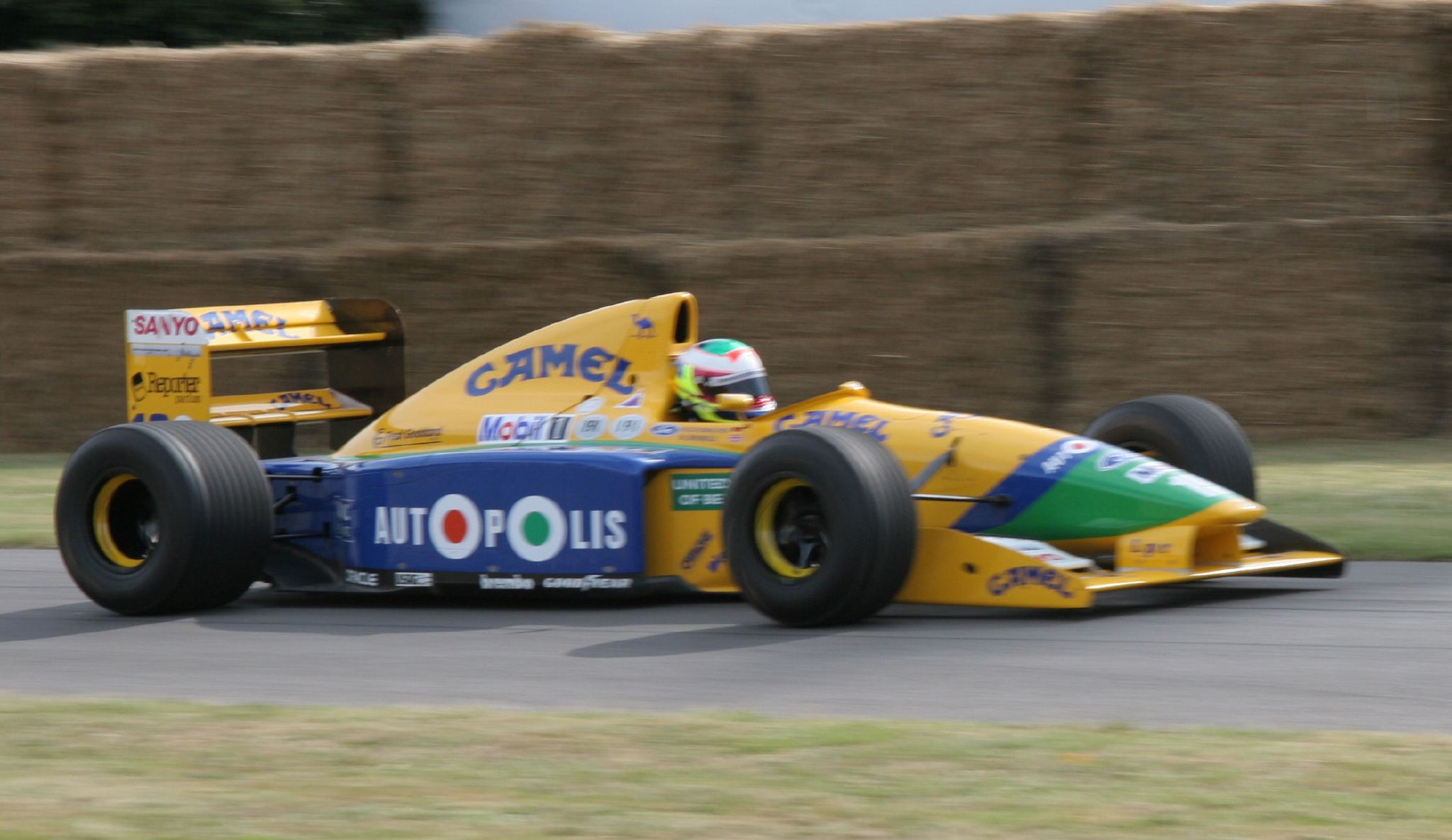
- The B191 at the 2006 Goodwood Festival of Speed
- Category: Formula One
- Constructor: Benetton
- Designers: John Barnard (Technical Director); Mike Coughlan (Chief Designer); Dominic Smith (Senior Aerodynamicist); Geoff Goddard (Chief Engine Designer) (Ford-Cosworth)
- Predecessor: B190
- Successor: B192

Technical specifications
- Chassis: Carbon fibre monocoque
- Suspension (front): Double wishbone, pushrod
- Suspension (rear): Double wishbone, pushrod
- Axle track: Front: 1,818 mm (71.6 in); Rear: 1,720 mm (68 in)
- Wheelbase: 2,880 mm (113.4 in)
- Engine: Ford HBA5, 3,498 cc (213.5 cu in), 75° V8, NA, mid-engine, longitudinally-mounted
- Transmission: Benetton transverse 6-speed Manual
- Power: 660 hp @ 12,000 rpm
- Weight: 505 kg (1,113 lb)
- Fuel: Mobil
- Tyres: 1991: Pirelli; 1992: Goodyear

Competition history
- Notable entrants: Camel Benetton Ford
- Notable drivers: 19. (Brazil) Roberto Moreno; 19. (Germany) Michael Schumacher; 20. (Brazil) Nelson Piquet; 20. (United Kingdom) Martin Brundle
- Debut: 1991 San Marino Grand Prix
- First win: 1991 Canadian Grand Prix
- Last win: 1991 Canadian Grand Prix
- Last event: 1992 Brazilian Grand Prix
Races	Wins	Podiums	Poles	F/Laps
17	1	4	0	1
- Constructors' Championships: 0
- Drivers' Championships: 0

The Benetton B191 is a Formula One racing car, with which the Benetton team competed in the 1991 Formula One season and at the beginning of 1992. Designed by John Barnard and Mike Coughlan, the car made its debut at the 1991 San Marino Grand Prix, driven by two Brazilian drivers, three-time World Drivers' Champion Nelson Piquet and Roberto Moreno. The B191 was powered by the Ford HBA5 V8 engine in an exclusive deal with Ford, and ran on Pirelli tyres. Following the Belgian Grand Prix the team replaced Moreno with German newcomer Michael Schumacher.

== History ==
Nelson Piquet gave the B191 its only win at the 1991 Canadian Grand Prix after Nigel Mansell's leading Williams-Renault suffered electrical failure less than half a lap from the finish gifting Piquet the last win of his Formula One career.

The car was pressed into service for the first three races of the 1992 season with small upgrades to bodywork and suspension. This car was dubbed the B191B. Schumacher remained with the team while Martin Brundle replaced the retiring Nelson Piquet in the team's second car.

The B191 was the first Benetton to feature the now standard raised nose first pioneered by Tyrrell in 1990.

The B191B was replaced by the Benetton B192 following the 1992 Brazilian Grand Prix.

== Complete Formula One results ==
(key) (results in italics indicate fastest lap)

Year	Entrant	Chassis	Engine	Tyres	Driver	1	2	3	4	5	6	7	8	9	10	11	12	13	14	15	16	Pts.	WCC
1991	Camel Benetton Ford	B191	Ford HBA5; V8	P		USA	BRA	SMR	MON	CAN	MEX	FRA	GBR	GER	HUN	BEL	ITA	POR	ESP	JPN	AUS	38.5*	4th
1991	Camel Benetton Ford	B191	Ford HBA5; V8	P	Roberto Moreno			13	4	Ret	5	Ret	Ret	8	8	4						38.5*	4th
1991	Camel Benetton Ford	B191	Ford HBA5; V8	P	Michael Schumacher												5	6	6	Ret	Ret	38.5*	4th
1991	Camel Benetton Ford	B191	Ford HBA5; V8	P	Nelson Piquet			Ret	Ret	1	Ret	8	5	Ret	Ret	3	6	5	11	7	4	38.5*	4th
1992	Camel Benetton Ford	B191B	Ford HBA5; V8	G		RSA	MEX	BRA	ESP	SMR	MON	CAN	FRA	GBR	GER	HUN	BEL	ITA	POR	JPN	AUS	91*	3rd
1992	Camel Benetton Ford	B191B	Ford HBA5; V8	G	Michael Schumacher	4	3	3														91*	3rd
1992	Camel Benetton Ford	B191B	Ford HBA5; V8	G	Martin Brundle	Ret	Ret	Ret														91*	3rd

* 6 points scored in 1991 using Benetton B190B
* 80 points scored in 1992 using Benetton B192
