= John Barnard (supporter of James II) =

17th-century political figure

John Barnard (born c. 1661–2; floruit 1685–93) was an English cleric and academic, a supporter of James II of England. A Catholic convert from the Church of England, he later returned.

== Early life ==
Barnard was the son of Dr. John Barnard, fellow of Lincoln College, Oxford, and sometime rector of Waddington, near Lincoln, by Lettice, daughter of Dr. Peter Heylyn. He became a student of Lincoln College (matriculating 17 November 1676 at age 15, so 1661–2 for date of his birth), and was elected fellow of Brasenose College (by then B.A.) in 1682. He took holy orders in the Church of England, ordained by Thomas Barlow in 1681, and became rector of North Thoresby.

== Under James II 1685–1689 ==
According to Wood, in December 1685, after James II's accession, Barnard "took all occasions to talk at Bal. coffee house on behalf of popery." (The "Balliol"coffee house may have been on the south side of the High Street, Oxford.) Later he declared himself a Catholic, and took the name of Johannes Augustine Barnard (or Bernard).

Wood wrote that Barnard was "protected by the king" (May 1686), "for what he should do or omit." In May 1686, James II lifted from Obadiah Walker, Master of University College, Barnard and others their obligations to attend religious services. It followed the events of Easter Day (4 April) that year, when Walker, Barnard, and Walker's "disciples" Nathaniel Boys and Thomas Deane (1651–1735) (both of University College) refused the sacrament. Robert Beddard calls Barnard a "devotee" of Walker.

In January 1687 James II mandated that Barnard should become White Reader in Moral Philosophy. The position, from 1673, had been treated as a sinecure, held by one of the proctors of the university. Barnard succeeded John Halton of Queen's College, who had become proctor in 1681. Beddard says Halton's retirement was statutory; it was after the usual tenure of five years. On 28 March 1687 Barnard was elected and admitted as White Reader.

In October 1688 Barnard left the university, and shortly sent in his resignation of his fellowship at Brasenose, anticipating the Glorious Revolution. He resigned the White Readership on 5 January 1689.

== Later life ==
Barnard was with James II during the Williamite War in Ireland when the deposed king landed there; on the account of Anthony Wood, James "talk'd familiarly with him". In September 1690 he returned from Ireland and arrived destitute in Chester. He was reconciled to the church of England, "as 'tis said",’ and was "maintain'd with dole for some time by the Bishop of Chester" (Nicholas Stratford). He then went to London.

James Gardiner, who was Barnard's godfather, was from 1695 Bishop of Lincoln. He presented Barnard to the rectory of Ludford Parva in 1701, and to the vicarage of Kelstern in 1702. In financial difficulties, he appealed for help to William Wake, Gardiner's successor in 1708. A pamphlet attack on Protestant views saw him excommunicated, and the details of the end of his life are opaque.

== Works ==
Barnard published:

- A new edition of the Geographical Dictionary of Edmund Bohun (1693, folio). It was prefaced by an essay on the work of Louis Moréri, A Reflection upon the Grand Dictionary Historique, or the Great Historical Dictionary of Lewis Morery, D.D., printed at Utrecht 1692.
- A translation (1695) as The Political Last Testament of Monsieur John Baptist Colbert of La vie de Jean-Baptiste Colbert by Gatien de Courtilz de Sandras.
- A compilation Lives of the Roman Emperors (1698, 2 vol.) translated from classical sources.
