= 1992 Formula One World Championship =

46th season of FIA Formula One motor racing

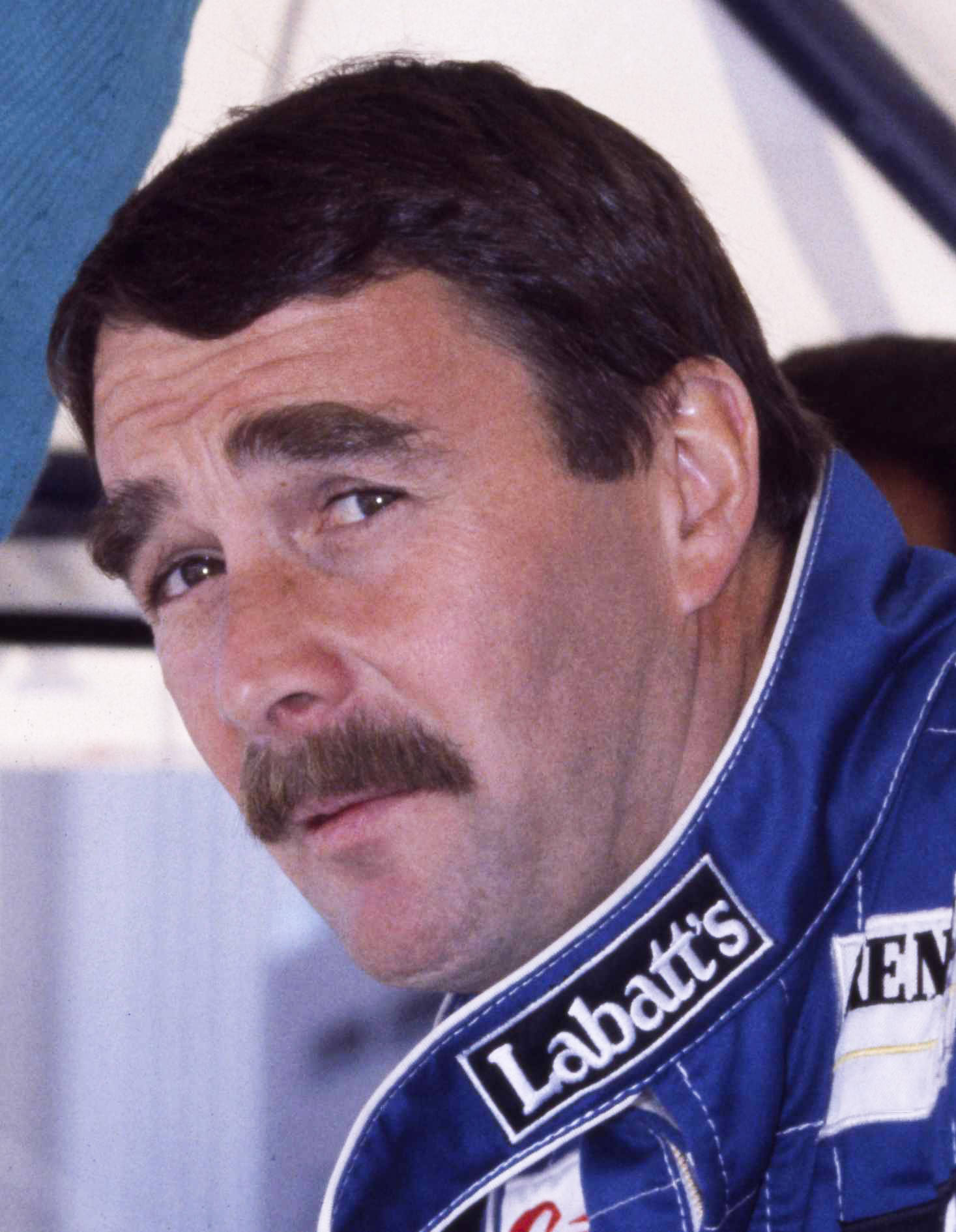
Nigel Mansell won his first and only Drivers' Championship with Williams.

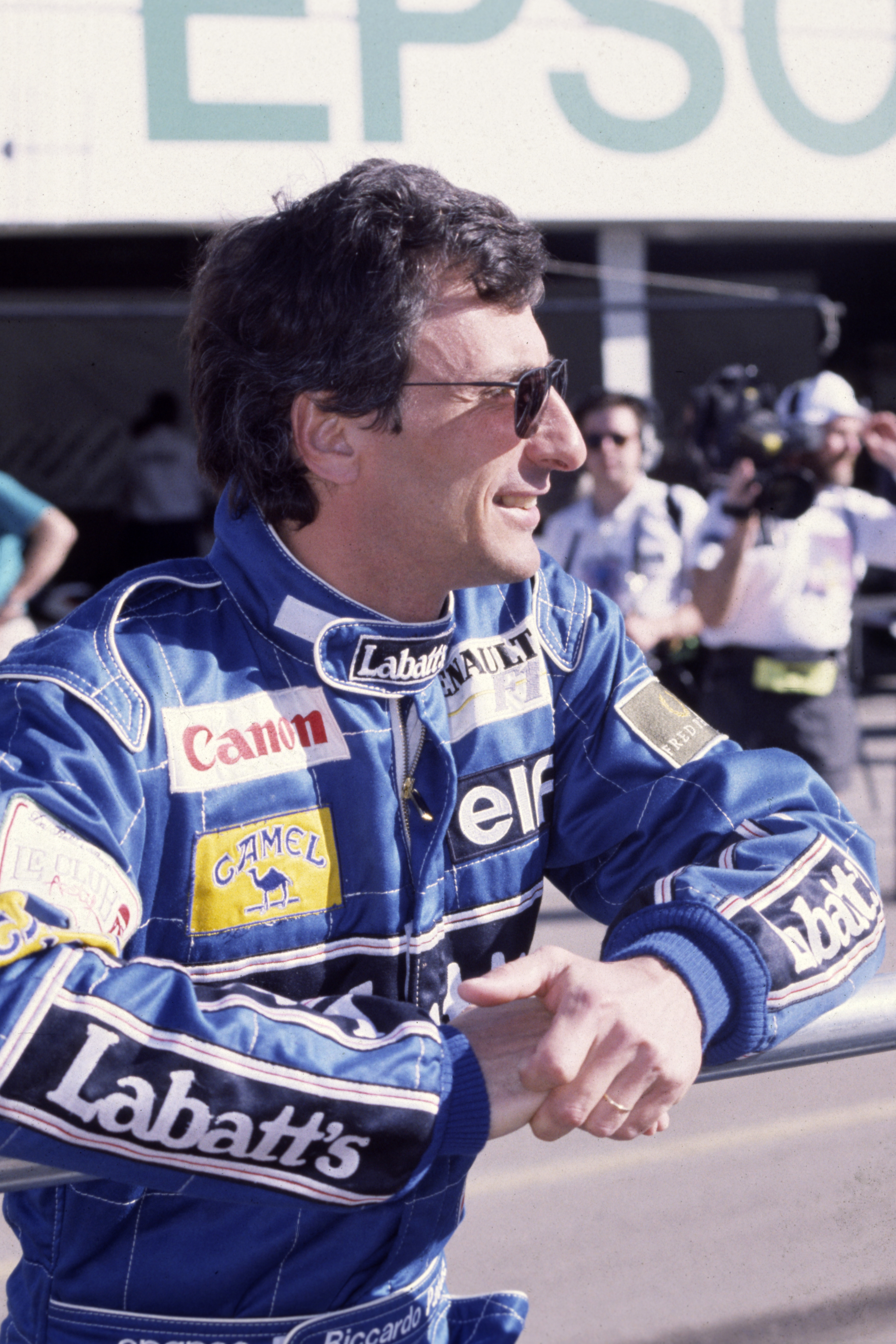
Mansell's teammate Riccardo Patrese finished as runner-up in the Drivers' Championship.

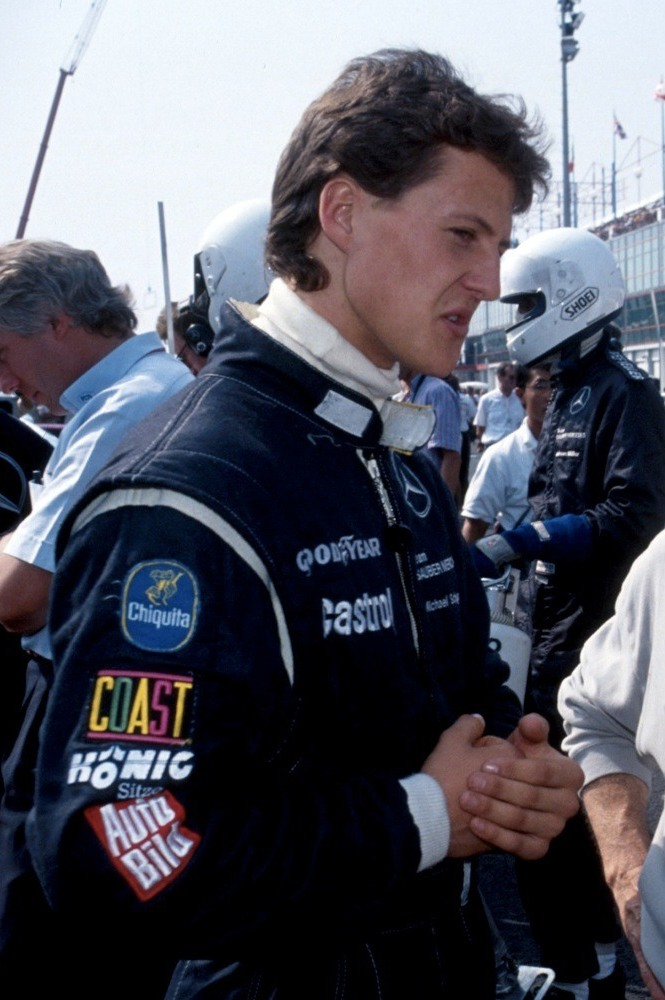
Michael Schumacher (pictured in 1991) ranked third for Benetton in the Drivers' Championship, having scored one win.

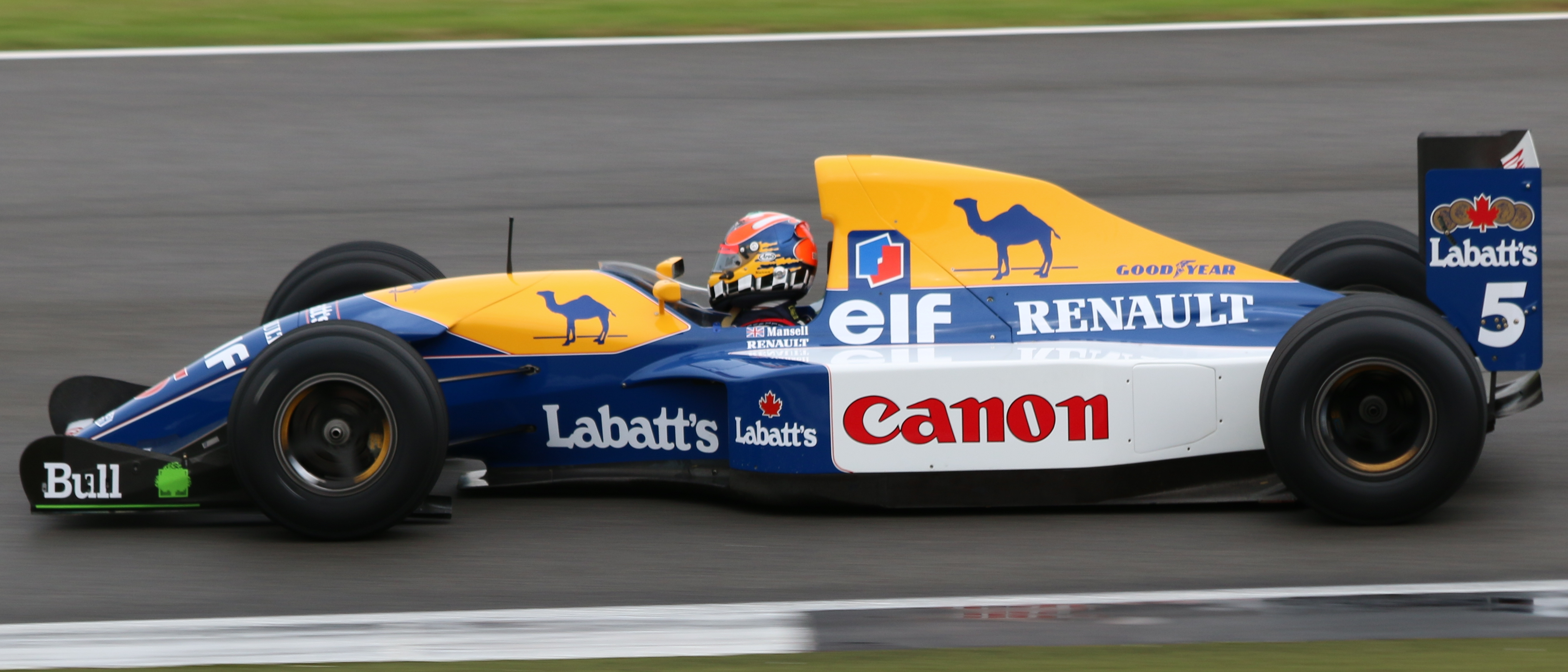
Williams-Renault won the Constructors' Championship title with the Williams FW14B.

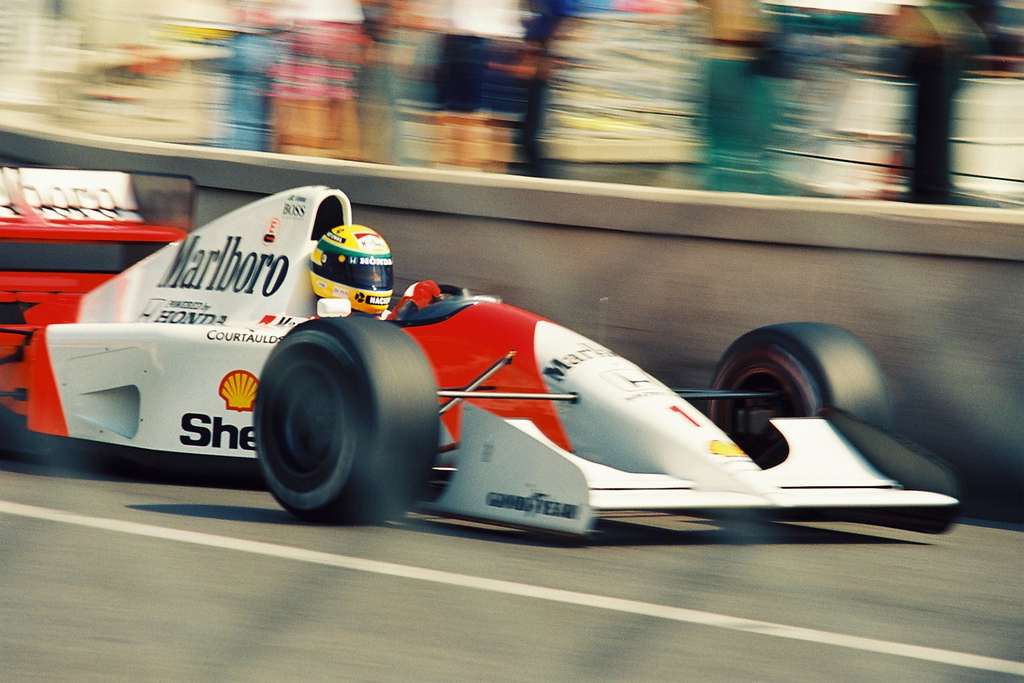
McLaren-Honda, the defending constructors' champion placed second with the McLaren MP4/7A & MP4/6B.

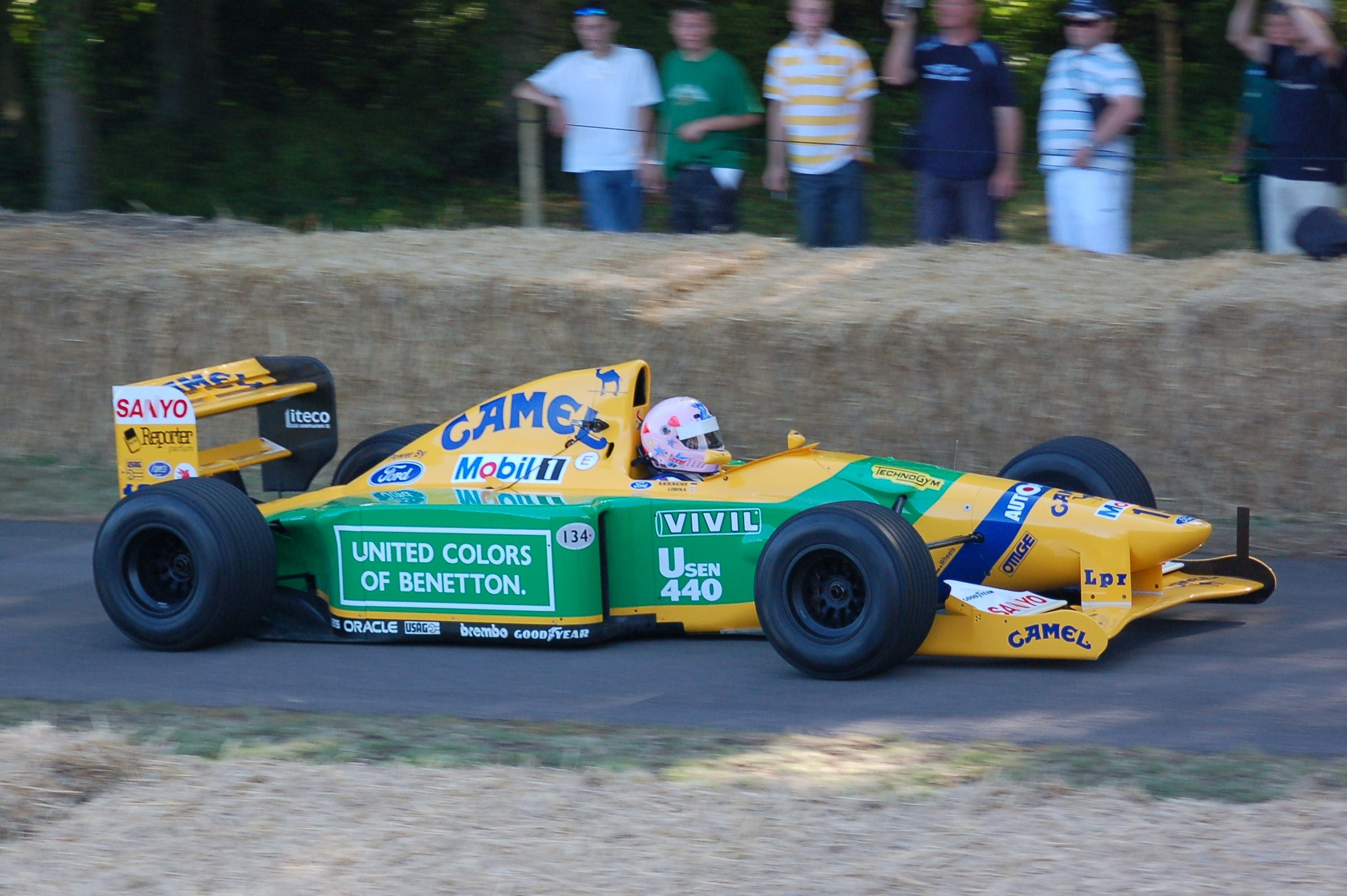
Benetton-Ford placed third with the Benetton B191B & B192.

The 1992 Formula One World Championship was the 46th season of FIA Formula One motor racing. It featured the 1992 Formula One World Championship for Drivers and the 1992 Formula One World Championship for Constructors, which were contested concurrently over a sixteen-race series that commenced on 1 March and ended on 8 November. Nigel Mansell, in what would prove to be his final full season in Formula One, won the Drivers' Championship and Williams-Renault won the Constructors' Championship.

Mansell won the first five races of the season and went on to become the first driver in Formula One history to win nine World Championship races in a single season. He sealed the championship at the Hungarian Grand Prix in mid-August, with five races still to run, becoming the first British driver to win the championship since James Hunt in 1976. Reigning champion Ayrton Senna won three races for McLaren-Honda but could only manage fourth in the championship, with Mansell's Williams teammate Riccardo Patrese finishing second and young Michael Schumacher third for Benetton-Ford.

This was the first season in which all teams had two regular drivers, a trend that has remained the same ever since. Although champion Mansell would start a combined six more Formula One Grands Prix across 1994 (with Williams) and 1995 (with McLaren), he would never contest a full F1 season again.

== Drivers and constructors ==
The following teams and drivers competed in the 1992 FIA Formula One World Championship. All teams competed with tyres supplied by Goodyear. This was the first season in which all teams ran two cars.

Entrant	Constructor	Chassis	Engine	No	Driver	Rounds
(United Kingdom) Honda Marlboro McLaren	McLaren-Honda	MP4/6B; MP4/7A	Honda RA122E 3.5 V12; Honda RA122E/B 3.5 V12	1	(Brazil) Ayrton Senna	All
(United Kingdom) Honda Marlboro McLaren	McLaren-Honda	MP4/6B; MP4/7A	Honda RA122E 3.5 V12; Honda RA122E/B 3.5 V12	2	(Austria) Gerhard Berger	All
(United Kingdom) Tyrrell	Tyrrell-Ilmor	020B	Ilmor 2175A 3.5 V10	3	(France) Olivier Grouillard	All
(United Kingdom) Tyrrell	Tyrrell-Ilmor	020B	Ilmor 2175A 3.5 V10	4	(Italy) Andrea de Cesaris	All
(United Kingdom) Canon Williams Renault	Williams-Renault	FW14B	Renault RS3C 3.5 V10; Renault RS4 3.5 V10	5	(United Kingdom) Nigel Mansell	All
(United Kingdom) Canon Williams Renault	Williams-Renault	FW14B	Renault RS3C 3.5 V10; Renault RS4 3.5 V10	6	(Italy) Riccardo Patrese	All
(United Kingdom) Brabham	Brabham-Judd	BT60B	Judd GV 3.5 V10	7	(Belgium) Eric van de Poele	1–10
(United Kingdom) Brabham	Brabham-Judd	BT60B	Judd GV 3.5 V10	8	(Italy) Giovanna Amati	1–3
(United Kingdom) Brabham	Brabham-Judd	BT60B	Judd GV 3.5 V10	8	(United Kingdom) Damon Hill	4–11
(United Kingdom) Footwork Mugen-Honda	Footwork-Mugen-Honda	FA13	Mugen-Honda MF-351H 3.5 V10	9	(Italy) Michele Alboreto	All
(United Kingdom) Footwork Mugen-Honda	Footwork-Mugen-Honda	FA13	Mugen-Honda MF-351H 3.5 V10	10	(Japan) Aguri Suzuki	All
(United Kingdom) Team Lotus (United Kingdom) Team Castrol Lotus	Lotus-Ford	102D; 107	Ford HBA5 3.5 V8	11	(Finland) Mika Häkkinen	All
(United Kingdom) Team Lotus (United Kingdom) Team Castrol Lotus	Lotus-Ford	102D; 107	Ford HBA5 3.5 V8	12	(United Kingdom) Johnny Herbert	All
(Italy) Fondmetal	Fondmetal-Ford	GR01; GR02	Ford HBA5 3.5 V8	14	(Switzerland) Andrea Chiesa	1–10
(Italy) Fondmetal	Fondmetal-Ford	GR01; GR02	Ford HBA5 3.5 V8	14	(Belgium) Eric van de Poele	11–13
(Italy) Fondmetal	Fondmetal-Ford	GR01; GR02	Ford HBA5 3.5 V8	15	(Italy) Gabriele Tarquini	1–13
(United Kingdom) March F1	March-Ilmor	CG911B	Ilmor 2175A 3.5 V10	16	(Austria) Karl Wendlinger	1–14
(United Kingdom) March F1	March-Ilmor	CG911B	Ilmor 2175A 3.5 V10	16	(Netherlands) Jan Lammers	15–16
(United Kingdom) March F1	March-Ilmor	CG911B	Ilmor 2175A 3.5 V10	17	(France) Paul Belmondo	1–11
(United Kingdom) March F1	March-Ilmor	CG911B	Ilmor 2175A 3.5 V10	17	(Italy) Emanuele Naspetti	12–16
(United Kingdom) Camel Benetton Ford	Benetton-Ford	B191B; B192	Ford HBA5 3.5 V8; Ford HBA7 3.5 V8	19	(Germany) Michael Schumacher	All
(United Kingdom) Camel Benetton Ford	Benetton-Ford	B191B; B192	Ford HBA5 3.5 V8; Ford HBA7 3.5 V8	20	(United Kingdom) Martin Brundle	All
(Italy) BMS Scuderia Italia	BMS Dallara-Ferrari	F192	Ferrari Tipo 037 3.5 V12	21	(Finland) JJ Lehto	All
(Italy) BMS Scuderia Italia	BMS Dallara-Ferrari	F192	Ferrari Tipo 037 3.5 V12	22	(Italy) Pierluigi Martini	All
(Italy) Minardi Team	Minardi-Lamborghini	M191B; M192	Lamborghini LE3512 3.5 V12	23	(Brazil) Christian Fittipaldi	1–8, 12–16
(Italy) Minardi Team	Minardi-Lamborghini	M191B; M192	Lamborghini LE3512 3.5 V12	23	(Italy) Alessandro Zanardi	9–11
(Italy) Minardi Team	Minardi-Lamborghini	M191B; M192	Lamborghini LE3512 3.5 V12	24	(Italy) Gianni Morbidelli	All
(France) Ligier Gitanes Blondes	Ligier-Renault	JS37	Renault RS3C 3.5 V10	25	(Belgium) Thierry Boutsen	All
(France) Ligier Gitanes Blondes	Ligier-Renault	JS37	Renault RS3C 3.5 V10	26	(France) Érik Comas	All
(Italy) Ferrari	Ferrari	F92A; F92AT	Ferrari Tipo 038 3.5 V12	27	(France) Jean Alesi	All
(Italy) Ferrari	Ferrari	F92A; F92AT	Ferrari Tipo 038 3.5 V12	28	(Italy) Ivan Capelli	1–14
(Italy) Ferrari	Ferrari	F92A; F92AT	Ferrari Tipo 038 3.5 V12	28	(Italy) Nicola Larini	15–16
(France) Central Park Venturi Larrousse	Venturi-Lamborghini	LC92	Lamborghini LE3512 3.5 V12	29	(France) Bertrand Gachot	All
(France) Central Park Venturi Larrousse	Venturi-Lamborghini	LC92	Lamborghini LE3512 3.5 V12	30	(Japan) Ukyo Katayama	All
(Republic of Ireland) Sasol Jordan Yamaha	Jordan-Yamaha	192	Yamaha OX99 3.5 V12	32	(Italy) Stefano Modena	All
(Republic of Ireland) Sasol Jordan Yamaha	Jordan-Yamaha	192	Yamaha OX99 3.5 V12	33	(Brazil) Maurício Gugelmin	All
(Italy) Andrea Moda Formula	Andrea Moda-Judd	C4B; S921	Judd GV 3.5 V10	34	(Italy) Alex Caffi	1–2
(Italy) Andrea Moda Formula	Andrea Moda-Judd	C4B; S921	Judd GV 3.5 V10	34	(Brazil) Roberto Moreno	3–7, 9–12
(Italy) Andrea Moda Formula	Andrea Moda-Judd	C4B; S921	Judd GV 3.5 V10	35	(Italy) Enrico Bertaggia	1–2
(Italy) Andrea Moda Formula	Andrea Moda-Judd	C4B; S921	Judd GV 3.5 V10	35	(United Kingdom) Perry McCarthy	3–7, 9–12

=== Team changes ===
- March completed a take-over of Leyton House Racing.
- Modena designed a car for 1992, but had to cease operations before the season started, due to insurmountable financial challenges.
- After a one-year spell with Lamborghini, Ligier signed a three-year full-works engine deal with Renault. They received the same treatment as Williams, by utilizing the same engine specifications.
- Lamborghini moved on to supply Minardi and Larrousse, who collaborated with Venturi Automobiles.
- Judd supplied Team Lotus and BMS Scuderia Italia in 1991, but moved on to Brabham and Andrea Moda in 1992. Lotus was supplied by Ford, BMS received a 1991-spec Ferrari engine.
- Brabham's former supplier, Yamaha, moved to Jordan.
- After preparing the Honda engines for Tyrrell in 1991, Mugen Motorsports made their public debut as supplier to Footwork. Tyrrell moved on to engine supplier Ilmor.

==== Mid-season changes ====
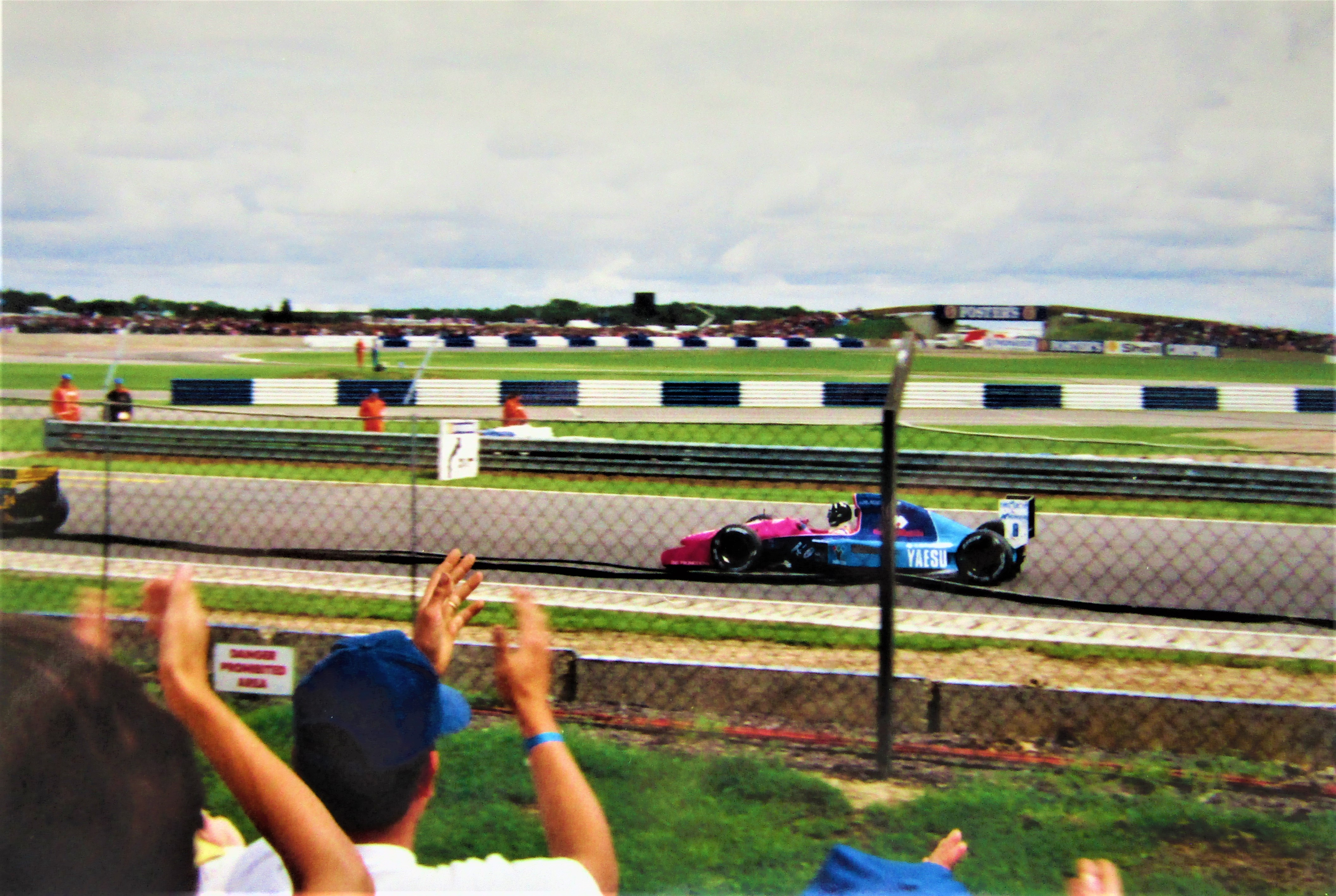
The Brabham team folded during the 1992 season.

- After being in Formula 1 since 1962, Brabham went into administration 11 races into the 1992 season.
- Andrea Moda was expelled from the championship after 12 races, on the regulatory grounds of "[failure to operate a] team in a manner compatible with the standards of the championship or in any way brings the championship into disrepute."
- The Fondmetal team ran out of money after 13 races.

==== Post-season ====
- March left the sport after more than twenty years in F1.

=== Driver changes ===
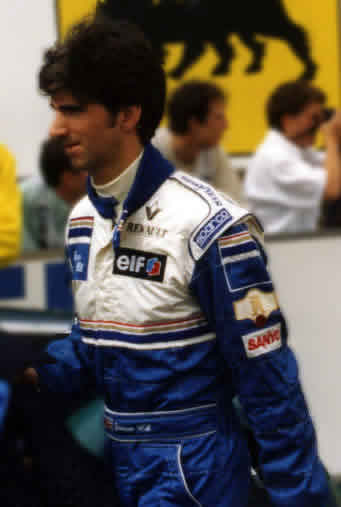
Damon Hill (pictured in 1995) made his Formula One debut with Brabham.

- After Alain Prost was released from his contract with Ferrari before the 1991 season ended, the team attracted Ivan Capelli.
- Three-time world champion Nelson Piquet retired and Benetton attracted Martin Brundle, coming from Brabham.
- Brabham signed Eric van de Poele and Giovanna Amati, the first female F1 driver since Desiré Wilson in 1980. Ex-driver Mark Blundell could not find a seat for 1992.
- Stefano Modena and Andrea de Cesaris switched employers, Modena going to Jordan and De Cesaris to Tyrrell. Jordan also signed Maurício Gugelmin from Leyton House, while Tyrrell replaced the retired Satoru Nakajima with Olivier Grouillard.
- Pierluigi Martini moved from Minardi to Scuderia Italia, replacing Emanuele Pirro making place at Minardi for debutant Christian Fittipaldi.
- Aguri Suzuki moved from Larrousse to Footwork, freeing a seat for newcomer and fellow Japanese Ukyo Katayama. Ex-Footwork driver Alex Caffi moved to Andrea Moda, besides Enrico Bertaggia.
- Andrea Chiesa debuted with Fondmetal, the team fielding a second car for the first time.

==== Mid-season changes ====
- After three races, Giovanna Amati was replaced by Williams test driver Damon Hill, while he was still competing in the F3000.
- Before the Hungarian Grand Prix, Andrea Chiesa was replaced at Fondmetal by Eric van de Poele, coming from the defunct Brabham team. Unfortunately, Fondmetal folded just three races later.
- At March, Emanuele Naspetti left the F3000 championship while he was leading, to replace Paul Belmondo, and Jan Lammers made a surprise comeback when he replaced Karl Wendlinger for the final two races of the season. Lammers set a record by returning a full ten years after his initial final race.
- Christian Fittipaldi was replaced at Minardi by Alessandro Zanardi when he crashed during qualifying of the French Grand Prix. After three races, the Brazilian returned.
- Ivan Capelli was dropped by Ferrari after the Portuguese Grand Prix, and the team promoted their test driver and ITCC champion Nicola Larini to a race seat. He had helped develop their active suspension system and when it was time to launch the car with that upgrade, Larini was awarded the drive.
- After just two races, Andrea Moda separated with both drivers and hired Roberto Moreno and Perry McCarthy.

== Calendar ==
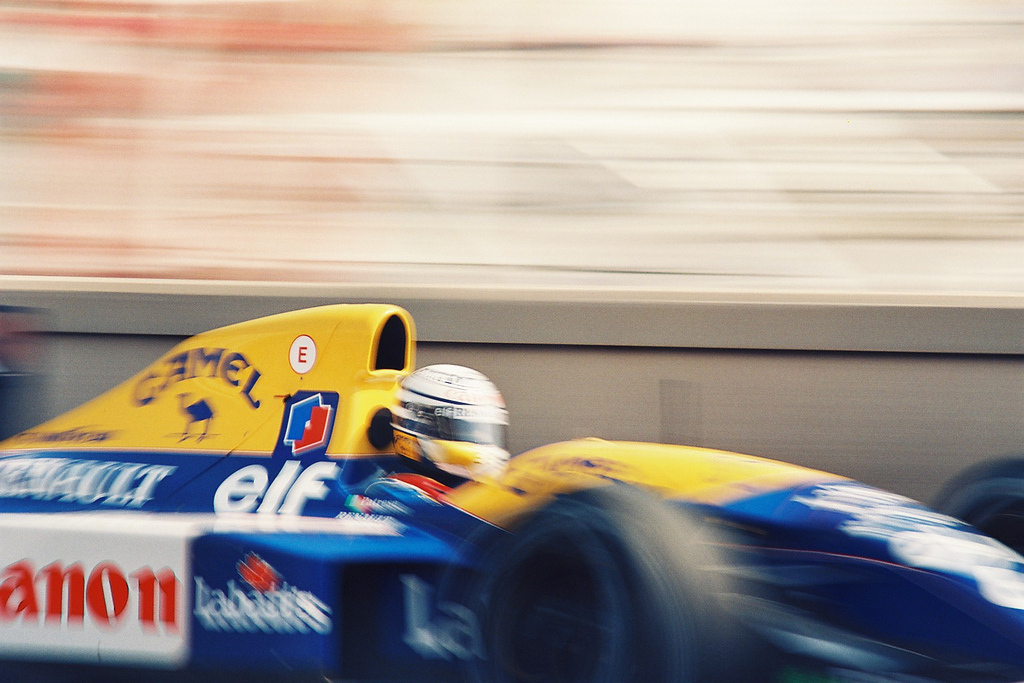
Williams-Renault won the Constructors' Championship

Round	Grand Prix	Circuit	Date
1	South African Grand Prix	(South Africa) Kyalami Grand Prix Circuit, Midrand	1 March
2	Mexican Grand Prix	Autódromo Hermanos Rodríguez, Mexico City	22 March
3	Brazilian Grand Prix	(Brazil) Autódromo José Carlos Pace, São Paulo	5 April
4	Spanish Grand Prix	(Spain) Circuit de Barcelona-Catalunya, Montmeló	3 May
5	San Marino Grand Prix	(Italy) Autodromo Enzo e Dino Ferrari, Imola	17 May
6	Monaco Grand Prix	Circuit de Monaco, Monte Carlo	31 May
7	Canadian Grand Prix	(Canada) Circuit Gilles Villeneuve, Montréal	14 June
8	French Grand Prix	(France) Circuit de Nevers Magny-Cours, Magny-Cours	5 July
9	British Grand Prix	(United Kingdom) Silverstone Circuit, Silverstone	12 July
10	German Grand Prix	(Germany) Hockenheimring, Hockenheim	26 July
11	Hungarian Grand Prix	(Hungary) Hungaroring, Mogyoród	16 August
12	Belgian Grand Prix	(Belgium) Circuit de Spa-Francorchamps, Stavelot	30 August
13	Italian Grand Prix	(Italy) Autodromo Nazionale di Monza, Monza	13 September
14	Portuguese Grand Prix	(Portugal) Autódromo do Estoril, Estoril	27 September
15	Japanese Grand Prix	(Japan) Suzuka International Racing Course, Suzuka	25 October
16	Australian Grand Prix	(Australia) Adelaide Street Circuit, Adelaide	8 November

=== Calendar changes ===
- The United States Grand Prix was originally scheduled for 15 March at the Phoenix street circuit, which was to be the second round as a result of the return of South Africa but was cancelled due to the inability to install more seats in order to attract spectators.
- This made way for the return of the South African Grand Prix. After a seven-year absence, the FIA lifted its ban on events in South Africa due to the end of Apartheid. The race was held again at Kyalami Grand Prix Circuit, but there was a new layout compared to the last time they raced in 1985.
- The Mexican Grand Prix was moved from its mid-June date to March and the Spanish Grand Prix was moved from September to May.
- The Austrian Grand Prix, originally scheduled for 16 August, was cancelled due to financial problems. The Hungarian Grand Prix moved up from 23 August to take its slot.
- The European Grand Prix, originally scheduled for 4 October at the Jerez circuit, was cancelled.

== Regulation changes ==
=== Technical regulations ===
- Unleaded gasoline fuel became mandatory for all Formula One cars from the 1992 season onwards, as leaded gasoline fuel was deemed too hazardous for health. Previously, unleaded gasoline fuel was optional for top teams only. From the Hungarian Grand Prix, FISA mandated pump fuel only with lower octane, further reducing engine power.
- Stricter crash tests were introduced.

=== Sporting and event regulations ===
- The use of the Safety Car was formalised.
- Circuits were demanded to lower the kerbs, to widen the pit lane to at least 12 meters and to add a chicane in the pit lane entry.

== Race-by-race ==
=== Race 1: South Africa ===
The season started off in South Africa at the newly rebuilt Kyalami circuit near the high altitude city of Johannesburg where Mansell took pole ahead of Senna, Berger, Patrese, Alesi and Schumacher. At the start, Patrese overtook both McLarens and Berger lost out to both Alesi and Schumacher as well. The order was: Mansell, Patrese, Senna, Alesi, Schumacher and Berger.

Mansell quickly pulled away from Patrese who was under no pressure at all from Senna. Brundle spun off on the first lap in the Benetton and then retired with a broken clutch. Alesi was well behind Senna and had a comfortable gap to Schumacher, whom Berger could do nothing about. The pit stops left the order unchanged, and it held until Alesi's engine failed on lap 41. Andrea de Cesaris was sixth and in the points for one lap until his engine failed as well.

Mansell won the race easily with Patrese making it a Williams 1–2 ahead of Senna, Schumacher, Berger and Johnny Herbert. Mansell had also won the previous South African Grand Prix, held in 1985, in a Williams-Honda.

=== Race 2: Mexico ===
The cancellation of the United States Grand Prix on a street circuit in Phoenix, Arizona, originally scheduled for 15 March left a 3-week gap between the first two races, and there was some controversy surrounding the next race in Mexico: the venue for this race, the Hermanos Rodríguez Autodrome in Mexico City (an even higher altitude city) had an appallingly bumpy track surface, thanks to the circuit being located on a geologically active area. It also had a dauntingly fast final corner called the Peraltada which was 180 degrees and banked. Although the banking had been eased from the previous year, making the corner slightly slower, the bumps were still disastrous as Ayrton Senna hit a nasty bump in the Esses and crashed into a concrete wall, receiving severe bruising. He was cleared fit enough to race.

The Williams cars were 1–2 in qualifying in Mexico ahead of the Benettons and the McLarens with Mansell on pole ahead of Patrese, Schumacher, Brundle, Berger and Senna. At the start, Senna blasted past his teammate and the Benettons with Brundle getting ahead of Schumacher. The order was: Mansell, Patrese, Senna, Brundle, Schumacher and Berger.

Schumacher quickly passed Brundle on lap 2 and soon afterwards there was a big queue behind Senna, who was apparently having some sort of trouble. Schumacher got past on lap 7 and the rest were relieved of being stuck up when Senna retired with transmission troubles on lap 11.

After the stops, Berger got ahead of Brundle only to be passed two laps later. Berger repassed Brundle on lap 36. Brundle got back ahead on lap 39 only for Berger to repass him two laps later. Brundle was back in fourth on lap 44 but retired with engine trouble three laps later, ending the battle for fourth. At the front, Mansell won with Patrese making it a Williams 1–2 again ahead of Schumacher, Berger, de Cesaris and Mika Häkkinen.

=== Race 3: Brazil ===
For the Brazilian Grand Prix at the Interlagos circuit in São Paulo, the Williamses were ahead of the McLarens with Mansell on pole ahead of Patrese with Senna third in front of his home crowd ahead of Berger, Schumacher and Alesi. On the parade lap, Berger stalled and had to start at the back. At the start, Mansell was poor and Patrese blasted ahead of him with Brundle getting ahead of Alesi. The order was: Patrese, Mansell, Senna, Schumacher, Brundle and Alesi.

Berger had to retire after only 4 laps in the pits with electrical failure. The Williamses pulled away while Senna was holding the rest at bay; Schumacher was 30 seconds behind by the time he had passed Senna for third on lap 13. Brundle and Alesi passed him soon afterwards and Senna retired with engine troubles on lap 17.

The stops brought Alesi closer to Brundle and Alesi made his move on lap 31. The two collided, with Brundle spinning out. This promoted Karl Wendlinger to fifth and he was there until his clutch failed on lap 56. As Thierry Boutsen collided with Érik Comas and forced Johnny Herbert off into the gravel at the Senna S as it forced both drivers to retire but Comas managed to continue, just 6 laps after Brundle's retirement. Meanwhile, Mansell pitted while passing back markers and took advantage of subsequent clear laps, taking over first place when Patrese pitted after slower laps passing more of the back markers. Mansell then built a lead and won with a 29-second lead over Patrese in second, making it yet another Williams 1–2 ahead of Schumacher, Alesi, Capelli and Michele Alboreto.

=== Race 4: Spain ===
Mansell was on pole once again in Spain at the Catalunya circuit in Montmeló ahead of Schumacher, Senna, Patrese, Capelli and Brundle. At the start, in torrential wet conditions, Patrese got by Senna and Schumacher while Alesi sensationally climbed up from eighth to third. The order was: Mansell, Patrese, Alesi, Schumacher, Senna and Capelli.

Brundle retired yet again after spinning off on the main straight with a clutch problem by lap 5, meaning it was his fourth consecutive retirement. Schumacher attacked and passed Alesi on lap 7. Senna tried to do the same but tipped Alesi into a spin, putting the Frenchman behind Berger and Capelli as well. By now the rain intensified, and Patrese spun off on lap 20 while trying to lap a backmarker. This put Mansell ahead of Schumacher, Senna, Berger, Capelli and Alesi. Maurício Gugelmin as the only Jordan in the race, and lapped by the McLarens, had spun into the pit wall at lap 25.

During the pit-stops, Alesi got past Capelli and began to charge up through the field. He cruised past Berger for fourth and began to attack Senna for third. He wanted to attack Schumacher as well and was in a hurry. The pressure was so intense that Senna spun off with two laps to go. At the same time, Capelli spun off as well. Mansell won again from Schumacher, Alesi, Berger, Alboreto and Pierluigi Martini.

=== Race 5: San Marino ===
At the San Marino Grand Prix at the Imola circuit in Italy, the Williamses were still well ahead of the McLarens and the Benettons, Mansell taking another pole ahead of Patrese, Senna, Berger, Schumacher and Brundle. At the start, Patrese attacked Mansell but Mansell kept the lead and Schumacher got ahead of Berger to take fourth. The order at the end of the first lap was: Mansell, Patrese, Senna, Schumacher, Berger and Brundle.

As usual, Mansell was pulling away from Patrese as the two of them began to pull away from the field. Capelli in the second Ferrari spun off into the gravel trap on lap 12. Schumacher was pressurizing Senna but it was he who made the mistake first, spinning out into retirement on lap 21 with the result of rear suspension damage after clipping the tyre wall. Alesi was planning to go without a stop and so after the others stopped, he had climbed up to third. However, he was soon under pressure from the McLarens of Senna and Berger. Senna went ahead at Tosa on lap 40, but Berger tried to follow him through and Alesi lost momentum and spun towards Berger, taking both out.

Mansell made it five wins out of five with Patrese making it one more Williams 1–2 ahead of Senna, Brundle, Alboreto and Martini.

=== Race 6: Monaco ===
In Monaco, the Williamses were again dominant, with Mansell taking six poles in six with Patrese beside him, Senna third, Alesi fourth, Berger fifth and Schumacher sixth. At the start, Senna got ahead of Patrese while Schumacher took Alesi and Berger into the first corner. However, Alesi took fourth back at Mirabeau and then the race settled down. The order was: Mansell, Senna, Patrese, Alesi, Schumacher and Berger.

Patrese began to attack Senna but then began to drop back with gearbox troubles. On lap 12, Schumacher tried to pass Alesi and the two collided, and an electronic box was damaged in Alesi's car, with Schumacher getting ahead. Alesi continued to stay fifth for another 16 laps before the damage forced him to retire on lap 28. This promoted Berger to fifth, a place which he held for just under five laps before he had to retire from gearbox troubles.

On lap 60, Alboreto, just about to be lapped by Senna, spun in front of him and Senna lost another ten seconds. Then, there was a loose wheelnut in Mansell's car and Mansell had to pit and rejoined behind Senna. He closed the gap quickly but with overtaking being extremely hard, Senna was able to legally block every move that Mansell made. Senna won from Mansell, Patrese, Schumacher, Brundle and Bertrand Gachot.

=== Race 7: Canada ===
There was a change in Circuit Gilles Villeneuve in Montreal, Canada with Senna taking his 61st career pole position ahead of Patrese, Mansell, Berger, Schumacher and Herbert. At the start, Mansell got ahead of Patrese and behind them Brundle was able to get by Herbert. The order was: Senna, Mansell, Patrese, Berger, Schumacher and Brundle.

The race settled down for the first fourteen laps, but on lap 15 Mansell attacked Senna at the final chicane and hit a kerb, pushing his car into the air. It landed nose-first into the gravel and spun back onto the track. Mansell claimed Senna had pushed him off the track. He was out and this forced Patrese to slow down and suddenly Berger went through to second. Senna then began to pull away from the field and the stops changed nothing. Senna still led Berger, Patrese, Schumacher, Brundle and Herbert. Herbert went out on lap 34 with clutch troubles.

Senna lost a certain victory when electrical failure put him out on lap 38. Behind them, Brundle passed Schumacher for third and this became second when Patrese's gearbox failed on lap 44. However, Brundle only lasted for two more laps before he retired with transmission trouble. Berger won from Schumacher, Alesi, Wendlinger, de Cesaris and Érik Comas.

=== Race 8: France ===
The Williamses took the front row at the Magny-Cours circuit in France ahead of the McLarens, with Mansell on pole ahead of Patrese, Senna, Berger, Schumacher and Alesi. At the start, Patrese got by Mansell while Berger got ahead of Senna and Brundle was able to pass Alesi. At the Adelaide hairpin, Schumacher tried to pass Senna but instead hit him, taking Senna out and forcing himself to pit. Meanwhile, Patrese and Mansell were side by side but Patrese kept the lead. Patrese led Mansell, Berger, Brundle, Alesi and Häkkinen and then Patrese waved Mansell through.

Nothing changed until lap 11 when Berger's engine failed. Soon afterwards it began to rain so heavily that the race was stopped. After some time the rain decreased and the grid formed up again. Patrese took the lead again with Alesi getting ahead of Häkkinen as well. Mansell tried to get past but Patrese defended and once again kept the lead. Patrese led Mansell, Brundle, Alesi, Häkkinen and Comas on aggregate. Patrese then waved Mansell through on track and soon Mansell got ahead on aggregate.

It began to rain again and everyone pitted for wets with Alesi going too late and dropping down to sixth. His engine failed on lap 61. Mansell won with Patrese making it a Williams 1–2 ahead of Brundle, Häkkinen, Comas and Herbert.

Thus, at the halfway stage of the season, Mansell was comfortably leading the championship with 66 points compared to Patrese's 34. Schumacher was third with 26, Senna was fourth with 18, Berger was fifth with 18, Alesi was sixth with 11, Brundle was seventh with 9 and Alboreto was eighth with 5. The 66 points that Mansell had after the French Grand Prix would have been enough for him to have been crowned world champion even if he had scored no further points in the season; Patrese was the eventual runner-up with 56 points. In the Constructors' Championship, Williams were dominant, with 100 points and well ahead of the field. McLaren were second with 36, Benetton were third with 35, and Ferrari were fourth with 13.

This Grand Prix saw, for the first time in the sport, the trialing of a safety car, in this case a Ford Escort RS Cosworth.

=== Race 9: Great Britain ===
Mansell took pole position at Silverstone in Britain with Patrese making another Williams 1–2 ahead of Senna, Schumacher, Berger and Brundle. At the start, Patrese got ahead of Mansell while Brundle had a superb start, blasting by the three in front of him, and Schumacher also got ahead of Senna. Patrese waved Mansell through on the Hangar straight with action behind as both Senna and Berger got ahead of Schumacher. Schumacher quickly recovered and passed Berger at Priory before the first lap was over. Mansell led Patrese, Brundle, Senna, Schumacher and Berger.

Herbert became the first of the leaders to retire from sixth position in the leading Lotus with transmission problems on lap 32. Alesi in the leading Ferrari eventually went off the track with mechanical problems by lap 44. Senna put Brundle under pressure but Brundle kept the place. The round of stops changed nothing, with Mansell leading from Patrese, Brundle, Senna, Schumacher and Berger. Schumacher then went wide at a corner giving fifth to Berger. Senna only lasted until lap 53 when his transmission failed. On the next lap, Schumacher passed Berger who was suffering from engine trouble, but still managed to cross the line just before it let go and finished fifth.

Mansell took the win with Patrese making it one more Williams 1–2 ahead of Brundle, Schumacher, Berger and Häkkinen. Spectators began to invade the track to celebrate his win even before the final lap had finished, and thousands entered the track following the chequered flag. The win saw Mansell overtake Jackie Stewart as the most successful British driver, with 28 wins to Stewart's 27. Mansell's record was subsequently overtaken by Lewis Hamilton.

This Grand Prix also saw repeated trials for a safety car, first run at the preceding French Grand Prix.

=== Race 10: Germany ===
At Hockenheim in Germany, the Williamses were again ahead of the McLarens, with Mansell on pole ahead of Patrese, Senna, Berger, Alesi and home hero Schumacher. At the start, Mansell defended from Patrese while Alesi lost out to both Schumacher and a fast-starting Brundle. Mansell was leading Patrese, Senna, Berger, Schumacher and Brundle at the end of the first lap.

Mansell then pulled away from Patrese who was doing the same to the McLarens. Soon the stops came and everyone in the top pitted except Senna and the Benettons were planning to go without a stop. Berger had a slow stop and retired with a misfire soon after. The order after the stops was: Senna, Mansell, Schumacher, Patrese, Brundle and Alesi.

Mansell did not want to stay second and passed Senna to lead with Patrese taking third from Schumacher soon after. Patrese was on a charge and smashed the lap record in his chase of Senna. He was right with Senna on the penultimate lap and tried to attack on the last lap. But Patrese in his attempt spun off into the gravel trap and was out. Mansell took his eighth win of the season ahead of Senna, Schumacher, Brundle, Alesi and Comas.

=== Race 11: Hungary ===
By the time the Hungarian Grand Prix in Mogyoród came around, Mansell was 46 points ahead of Patrese and the Williams team were 77 points ahead of Benetton with 6 races to go. This was the chance for Williams to seal both titles and they were dominant, but it was Patrese who took pole ahead of Mansell, Senna, Schumacher, Berger and Brundle. At the start, Berger got by Schumacher and then Mansell lost momentum and Senna passed him with Berger following his teammate through. The order was: Patrese, Senna, Berger, Mansell, Schumacher and Brundle.

There was a collision on the first lap between Comas, Herbert, Boutsen and Tarquini who all retired on the first lap (meaning both Ligiers of Comas and Boutsen retired on the first lap), before Van de Poole spun into retirement at the first corner on lap 3 as both Fondmetals retired after only 2 laps. Mansell passed Berger on lap 8 and set off after Senna. However, as hard as he tried, the combination of the small circuit and Senna's skills in defending meant that he could not pass. Alesi in the leading Ferrari behind the leading pack spun out with the rear wheels in the gravel trap by lap 15. On lap 31, Patrese made a mistake and went wide and rejoined behind Berger. Two laps later, Mansell passed Berger to get back third. Then, a pivotal movement came on lap 39 when Patrese spun off. He rejoined in seventh, outside the points which meant that Mansell would be the world champion if results stayed the same. However, on lap 51, Mansell had to go to the pits with tyre troubles and rejoined in sixth, just ahead of Patrese. Mansell quickly passed Häkkinen but before Patrese, who was right behind, could take sixth, Patrese's engine blew. He was out and would get no points.

Mansell quickly caught and passed Brundle on lap 60 and four laps later, he was up to third when Schumacher's rear wing broke, spinning him out and retired on lap 64. Senna, a minute ahead, made a precautionary stop just as Häkkinen passed Brundle for fourth. Mansell passed Berger for second and now had a toehold on the championship. Soon afterwards, Häkkinen tried to pass Berger and spun into Brundle's path. Brundle was forced to spin to avoid a collision and both rejoined without losing places, with Häkkinen staying ahead. Senna won ahead of new world champion Mansell, Berger, Häkkinen, Brundle and Capelli.

=== Race 12: Belgium ===
Now to Spa-Francorchamps in Belgium and champion-elect Mansell took pole ahead of Senna, Schumacher, Patrese, Alesi and Berger. At the start, it was damp and Senna outdragged Mansell with Patrese getting ahead of Schumacher while Berger did not move. Senna was leading Mansell, Patrese, Schumacher, Alesi and Thierry Boutsen.

At the start, Berger failed to get away and retired after an immediate transmission problem. Mansell attacked and passed Senna at the end of the second lap with Patrese following suit. Then it began to rain and almost everybody pitted for wets. Senna stayed out in the hope the rain would stop but it did not. He pitted late and rejoined down in 12th as Alesi went out with a puncture after colliding with Mansell at La Source. The order was: Mansell, Patrese, Schumacher, Brundle, Häkkinen and Boutsen. Capelli suffered a dramatic engine failure on lap 26 as he went straight off into the gravel trap at Blanchimont whilst battling Herbert for sixth position. The track was beginning to dry and Boutsen spun off on lap 28. Schumacher lost two seconds after going off the track and stopped for dries at the end of the lap. However, Mansell and Patrese stayed out far too long and when both pitted late, they rejoined behind Schumacher. Herbert eventually retired yet again with engine problems on lap 43, the Englishman would be classified 13th.

Mansell tried to close in but cracked an exhaust and dropped back. Patrese suffered the same fate and had to hold back Brundle. Behind, the recovering Senna took fifth from Häkkinen. Schumacher took his maiden win ahead of Mansell, Patrese, Brundle, Senna and Häkkinen. The Constructors' Championship went to Williams after their 2–3 finish. This was also the only race to have 18 classified finishers, the highest number of finishers that year.

Thus, with three-quarters of the season over, Mansell was the World Champion with 98 points, with Patrese second with 44, Schumacher third with 43, Senna fourth with 36, Berger fifth with 24, Brundle sixth with 21, Alesi seventh with 13, and Häkkinen eighth with 9. Williams were the World Champion in the Constructors' Championship with 142 points, with Benetton second with 64, McLaren third with 60, and Ferrari fourth with 16.

=== Race 13: Italy ===
At Monza in Italy, Mansell was on pole ahead of Senna, Alesi, Berger, Patrese and Schumacher. At the start, Mansell took off while Patrese got ahead of Alesi and Berger lost out to Schumacher, Capelli and Brundle. Mansell led Senna, Patrese, Alesi, Schumacher and Capelli.

Mansell pulled away fast with Senna holding up Patrese. On lap 13, both Ferraris went out: Alesi with trouble in his fuel system and Capelli with electrical problems. Patrese then passed Senna but Mansell was already 10 seconds up the road. Then, everybody stopped during which Brundle got ahead of Schumacher. The order was: Mansell, Patrese, Senna, Brundle, Schumacher and Berger. Then Mansell suddenly slowed down and allowed Patrese to pass him.

Then, on lap 36, he began to drop back with hydraulic troubles. Senna, Brundle, Schumacher and Berger all passed him. He trolled round and retired in the pits on lap 41. Patrese led but then Senna began to close in. Patrese also began to suffer from hydraulic troubles and Senna passed him on lap 49. On the next lap, both Brundle and Schumacher found a way through. Patrese held fourth until the last lap when Berger passed him. Senna won from Brundle, Schumacher, Berger, the hobbling Patrese and de Cesaris.

=== Race 14: Portugal ===
The Williamses were again ahead of the McLarens and the Benettons in Estoril just outside Lisbon with Mansell on pole ahead of Patrese, Senna, Berger, Schumacher and Brundle. At the start, Schumacher was late firing up and started at the back of the grid. At the start, Berger got ahead of Senna. Mansell led from Patrese, Berger, Senna, Brundle and Häkkinen.

Herbert in the second Lotus collided with Alesi on the first lap, Herbert eventually crashed out on lap 3 as Alesi in the leading Ferrari had spun off by lap 13, making it his 4th retirement in a row. Then it was the usual sight of Mansell pulling away from Patrese and the two getting away from the rest. The Williamses pitted early unlike the McLarens. Mansell had a quick stop and rejoined in the lead but Patrese had a problem with his right rear jack and joined behind the McLarens. He passed Senna quickly and set off after Berger. On lap 35, the recovering Schumacher took sixth from Alboreto. Soon after, Patrese was right with Berger, looking for a way through.

Berger realised that he had blistered his tyres and slowed down as he was about to go to the pits. Patrese was caught unawares, hit the back of Berger and had a massive crash. Luckily, Patrese was unhurt. Schumacher hit the debris and had to pit again, dropping back to eighth. Mansell took his 30th career win ahead of Berger, Senna, Brundle, Häkkinen and Alboreto.

With two more races to go, Mansell was already World Champion with 108 points but there was a big battle for second. Senna was second with 50, Schumacher was third with 47, Patrese was fourth with 46, Berger was fifth with 33, Brundle was sixth with 30, Alesi was seventh with 13, and Häkkinen was eighth with 11. In the Constructors' Championship, Williams was the World Champion with 154 points. McLaren was second with 83, Benetton was third with 77, and Ferrari was fourth with 16.

=== Race 15: Japan ===
Before the race at Suzuka in Japan, Ferrari had dropped Capelli who had a poor season and replaced him with Nicola Larini. In qualifying, the Williamses showed their class with Mansell taking pole ahead of Patrese, Senna, Berger, Schumacher and Herbert. At the start, there were no changes at the front and Mansell still led Patrese, Senna, Berger, Schumacher and Herbert.

Senna did not last long, going out with engine troubles on lap 3. Gouillard had crashed out in the second Tyrrell by lap 6. Berger decided to make an early stop and dropped back down to sixth. Schumacher had gearbox troubles and retired at the end of lap 13. Herbert now inherited third only to go out with the same problems two laps later. Berger and Brundle who stopped earlier did not stop when the others did and so the order after the stops was: Mansell, Patrese, Berger, Häkkinen, Brundle and Comas.

On lap 36, Mansell slowed down and let Patrese through before again speeding up and hanging on Patrese's tail. However, on lap 45, an engine failure ended Mansell's race. At the same time, Häkkinen went out with the same problem. Patrese won from Berger, Brundle, de Cesaris, Alesi and Christian Fittipaldi.

=== Race 16: Australia ===
For the season's final race on the streets of Adelaide, Australia, Mansell took pole ahead of Senna, Patrese, Berger, Schumacher and Alesi. At the start, Alesi had to hold off Brundle and there were no changes ahead of him. The order was: Mansell, Senna, Patrese, Berger, Schumacher and Alesi.

There was a collision at the start behind the leaders as Grouillard's Tyrrell collided with the Dallara of Martini on the first lap (eliminating both drivers on the same lap). However, Mansell did not pull away as usual. Senna was right with him and tried to pass him on lap 8. Gugelmin had once again spun out and crashed in the second Jordan by lap 9. He went wide and Mansell retained the lead. The top two were pulling away from Patrese and the rest but Senna could not attack Mansell. The gap stayed at less than a second. Then, on lap 19, entering the final corner, Senna crashed into the back of Mansell resulting in both drivers retiring. Some claimed that Mansell 'brake tested' Senna.

Patrese was now leading under immense pressure from Berger. Berger tried to pass around the outside but he too went wide. While Patrese did not pit, Berger pitted, followed 5 laps later by Schumacher. Berger rejoined 4 seconds ahead. Behind them, Brundle had got ahead of Alesi in the stops. On lap 51, Patrese, nearly 20 seconds ahead, coasted to a halt with an engine failure. So, Berger won with Schumacher close behind ahead of Brundle, Alesi, Boutsen (the last time the Belgian would score points) and Stefano Modena, this race was remembered for being Modena's last Grand Prix and the only point for the Jordan team that season.

=== Season result ===
At the end of the season, Mansell was named world champion with 108 points with Patrese edging out the battle for second with 56, Schumacher third with 53, Senna fourth with 50, Berger fifth with 49, Brundle sixth with 38, Alesi seventh with 18 and Häkkinen eighth with 11. In the Constructors' Championship, Williams was dominant champion with 164 points, McLaren just edging out second with 99, Benetton a close third with 91, and Ferrari fourth with 21.

== Results and standings ==
=== Grands Prix ===
Round	Grand Prix	Pole position	Fastest lap	Winning driver	Winning constructor	Report
1	(South Africa) South African Grand Prix	(United Kingdom) Nigel Mansell	(United Kingdom) Nigel Mansell	(United Kingdom) Nigel Mansell	(United Kingdom) Williams-Renault	Report
2	(Mexico) Mexican Grand Prix	(United Kingdom) Nigel Mansell	(Austria) Gerhard Berger	(United Kingdom) Nigel Mansell	(United Kingdom) Williams-Renault	Report
3	(Brazil) Brazilian Grand Prix	(United Kingdom) Nigel Mansell	(Italy) Riccardo Patrese	(United Kingdom) Nigel Mansell	(United Kingdom) Williams-Renault	Report
4	(Spain) Spanish Grand Prix	(United Kingdom) Nigel Mansell	(United Kingdom) Nigel Mansell	(United Kingdom) Nigel Mansell	(United Kingdom) Williams-Renault	Report
5	(Italy) San Marino Grand Prix	(United Kingdom) Nigel Mansell	(Italy) Riccardo Patrese	(United Kingdom) Nigel Mansell	(United Kingdom) Williams-Renault	Report
6	Monaco Grand Prix	(United Kingdom) Nigel Mansell	(United Kingdom) Nigel Mansell	(Brazil) Ayrton Senna	(United Kingdom) McLaren-Honda	Report
7	(Canada) Canadian Grand Prix	(Brazil) Ayrton Senna	(Austria) Gerhard Berger	(Austria) Gerhard Berger	(United Kingdom) McLaren-Honda	Report
8	(France) French Grand Prix	(United Kingdom) Nigel Mansell	(United Kingdom) Nigel Mansell	(United Kingdom) Nigel Mansell	(United Kingdom) Williams-Renault	Report
9	(United Kingdom) British Grand Prix	(United Kingdom) Nigel Mansell	(United Kingdom) Nigel Mansell	(United Kingdom) Nigel Mansell	(United Kingdom) Williams-Renault	Report
10	(Germany) German Grand Prix	(United Kingdom) Nigel Mansell	(Italy) Riccardo Patrese	(United Kingdom) Nigel Mansell	(United Kingdom) Williams-Renault	Report
11	(Hungary) Hungarian Grand Prix	(Italy) Riccardo Patrese	(United Kingdom) Nigel Mansell	(Brazil) Ayrton Senna	(United Kingdom) McLaren-Honda	Report
12	(Belgium) Belgian Grand Prix	(United Kingdom) Nigel Mansell	(Germany) Michael Schumacher	(Germany) Michael Schumacher	(United Kingdom) Benetton-Ford	Report
13	(Italy) Italian Grand Prix	(United Kingdom) Nigel Mansell	(United Kingdom) Nigel Mansell	(Brazil) Ayrton Senna	(United Kingdom) McLaren-Honda	Report
14	(Portugal) Portuguese Grand Prix	(United Kingdom) Nigel Mansell	(Brazil) Ayrton Senna	(United Kingdom) Nigel Mansell	(United Kingdom) Williams-Renault	Report
15	(Japan) Japanese Grand Prix	(United Kingdom) Nigel Mansell	(United Kingdom) Nigel Mansell	(Italy) Riccardo Patrese	(United Kingdom) Williams-Renault	Report
16	(Australia) Australian Grand Prix	(United Kingdom) Nigel Mansell	(Germany) Michael Schumacher	(Austria) Gerhard Berger	(United Kingdom) McLaren-Honda	Report

=== Scoring system ===
Points were awarded to the top six classified finishers in the following system:

Position	1st	2nd	3rd	4th	5th	6th
Race	10	6	4	3	2	1

=== World Drivers' Championship standings ===
Pos.	Driver	RSA (South Africa)	MEX (Mexico)	BRA (Brazil)	ESP (Spain)	SMR (Italy)	MON (Monaco)	CAN (Canada)	FRA (France)	GBR (United Kingdom)	GER (Germany)	HUN (Hungary)	BEL (Belgium)	ITA (Italy)	POR (Portugal)	JPN (Japan)	AUS (Australia)	Points
1	(United Kingdom) Nigel Mansell	1^{P}^{F}	1^{P}	1^{P}	1^{P}^{F}	1^{P}	2^{P}^{F}	Ret	1^{P}^{F}	1^{P}^{F}	1^{P}	2^{F}	2^{P}	Ret^{P}^{F}	1^{P}	Ret^{P}^{F}	Ret^{P}	108
2	(Italy) Riccardo Patrese	2	2	2^{F}	Ret	2^{F}	3	Ret	2	2	8^{F}^{†}	Ret^{P}	3	5	Ret	1	Ret	56
3	(Germany) Michael Schumacher	4	3	3	2	Ret	4	2	Ret	4	3	Ret	1^{F}	3	7	Ret	2^{F}	53
4	(Brazil) Ayrton Senna	3	Ret	Ret	9^{†}	3	1	Ret^{P}	Ret	Ret	2	1	5	1	3^{F}	Ret	Ret	50
5	(Austria) Gerhard Berger	5	4^{F}	Ret	4	Ret	Ret	1^{F}	Ret	5	Ret	3	Ret	4	2	2	1	49
6	(United Kingdom) Martin Brundle	Ret	Ret	Ret	Ret	4	5	Ret	3	3	4	5	4	2	4	3	3	38
7	(France) Jean Alesi	Ret	Ret	4	3	Ret	Ret	3	Ret	Ret	5	Ret	Ret	Ret	Ret	5	4	18
8	(Finland) Mika Häkkinen	9	6	10	Ret	DNQ	Ret	Ret	4	6	Ret	4	6	Ret	5	Ret	7	11
9	(Italy) Andrea de Cesaris	Ret	5	Ret	Ret	14^{†}	Ret	5	Ret	Ret	Ret	8	8	6	9	4	Ret	8
10	(Italy) Michele Alboreto	10	13	6	5	5	7	7	7	7	9	7	Ret	7	6	15	Ret	6
11	(France) Érik Comas	7	9	Ret	Ret	9	10	6	5	8	6	Ret	DNQ	Ret	Ret	Ret	Ret	4
12	(Austria) Karl Wendlinger	Ret	Ret	Ret	8	12	Ret	4	Ret	Ret	16	Ret	11	10	Ret			3
13	(Italy) Ivan Capelli	Ret	Ret	5	10^{†}	Ret	Ret	Ret	Ret	9	Ret	6	Ret	Ret	Ret			3
14	(Belgium) Thierry Boutsen	Ret	10	Ret	Ret	Ret	12	10	Ret	10	7	Ret	Ret	Ret	8	Ret	5	2
15	(United Kingdom) Johnny Herbert	6	7	Ret	Ret	Ret	Ret	Ret	6	Ret	Ret	Ret	13^{†}	Ret	Ret	Ret	13	2
16	(Italy) Pierluigi Martini	Ret	Ret	Ret	6	6	Ret	8	10	15	11	Ret	Ret	8	Ret	10	Ret	2
17	(Italy) Stefano Modena	DNQ	Ret	Ret	DNQ	Ret	Ret	Ret	Ret	Ret	DNQ	Ret	15	DNQ	13	7	6	1
18	(Brazil) Christian Fittipaldi	Ret	Ret	Ret	11	Ret	8	13	DNQ				DNQ	DNQ	12	6	9	1
19	(France) Bertrand Gachot	Ret	11	Ret	Ret	Ret	6	DSQ	Ret	Ret	14	Ret	18^{†}	Ret	Ret	Ret	Ret	1
—	(Japan) Aguri Suzuki	8	DNQ	Ret	7	10	11	DNQ	Ret	12	Ret	Ret	9	Ret	10	8	8	0
—	(Finland) JJ Lehto	Ret	8	8	Ret	11^{†}	9	9	9	13	10	DNQ	7	11^{†}	Ret	9	Ret	0
—	(Italy) Gianni Morbidelli	Ret	Ret	7	Ret	Ret	Ret	11	8	17^{†}	12	DNQ	16	Ret	14	14	10	0
—	(Brazil) Maurício Gugelmin	11	Ret	Ret	Ret	7	Ret	Ret	Ret	Ret	15	10	14	Ret	Ret	Ret	Ret	0
—	(France) Olivier Grouillard	Ret	Ret	Ret	Ret	8	Ret	12	11	11	Ret	Ret	Ret	Ret	Ret	Ret	Ret	0
—	(Japan) Ukyo Katayama	12	12	9	DNQ	Ret	DNPQ	Ret	Ret	Ret	Ret	Ret	17	9^{†}	Ret	11	Ret	0
—	(France) Paul Belmondo	DNQ	DNQ	DNQ	12	13	DNQ	14	DNQ	DNQ	13	9						0
—	(Belgium) Eric van de Poele	13	DNQ	DNQ	DNQ	DNQ	DNQ	DNQ	DNQ	DNQ	DNQ	Ret	10	Ret				0
—	(Italy) Emanuele Naspetti												12	Ret	11	13	Ret	0
—	(Italy) Nicola Larini															12	11	0
—	(United Kingdom) Damon Hill				DNQ	DNQ	DNQ	DNQ	DNQ	16	DNQ	11						0
—	(Netherlands) Jan Lammers															Ret	12	0
—	(Italy) Gabriele Tarquini	Ret	Ret	Ret	Ret	Ret	Ret	Ret	Ret	14	Ret	Ret	Ret	Ret				0
—	(Switzerland) Andrea Chiesa	DNQ	Ret	DNQ	Ret	DNQ	DNQ	DNQ	Ret	DNQ	DNQ							0
—	(Brazil) Roberto Moreno			DNPQ	DNPQ	DNPQ	Ret	DNPQ		DNPQ	DNPQ	DNQ	DNQ					0
—	(Italy) Alessandro Zanardi									DNQ	Ret	DNQ						0
—	(Italy) Giovanna Amati	DNQ	DNQ	DNQ														0
—	(United Kingdom) Perry McCarthy			EX	DNPQ	DNPQ	DNPQ	DNP		DNPQ	EX	DNPQ	DNQ					0
—	(Italy) Alex Caffi	EX	DNP															0
—	(Italy) Enrico Bertaggia	EX	DNP															0
Pos.	Driver	RSA (South Africa)	MEX (Mexico)	BRA (Brazil)	ESP (Spain)	SMR (Italy)	MON (Monaco)	CAN (Canada)	FRA (France)	GBR (United Kingdom)	GER (Germany)	HUN (Hungary)	BEL (Belgium)	ITA (Italy)	POR (Portugal)	JPN (Japan)	AUS (Australia)	Points

Key
Colour	Result
Gold	Winner
Silver	Second place
Bronze	Third place
Green	Other points position
Blue	Other classified position
Blue	Not classified, finished (NC)
Purple	Not classified, retired (Ret)
Red	Did not qualify (DNQ)
Red	Did not pre-qualify (DNPQ)
Black	Disqualified (DSQ)
White	Did not start (DNS)
White	Race cancelled (C)
Blank	Did not practice (DNP)
Blank	Excluded (EX)
Blank	Did not arrive (DNA)
Blank	Withdrawn (WD)
Blank	Did not enter (empty cell)
Annotation	Meaning
P	Pole position
F	Fastest lap
†	Did not finish, but classified for completing over 90% of the race distance

Notes:

- † – Driver did not finish the Grand Prix but was classified, as they completed more than 90% of the race distance.

=== World Constructors' Championship standings ===
Pos.	Constructor	No.	RSA (South Africa)	MEX (Mexico)	BRA (Brazil)	ESP (Spain)	SMR (Italy)	MON (Monaco)	CAN (Canada)	FRA (France)	GBR (United Kingdom)	GER (Germany)	HUN (Hungary)	BEL (Belgium)	ITA (Italy)	POR (Portugal)	JPN (Japan)	AUS (Australia)	Points
1	(United Kingdom) Williams-Renault	5	1^{P}^{F}	1^{P}	1^{P}	1^{P}^{F}	1^{P}	2^{P}^{F}	Ret	1^{P}^{F}	1^{P}^{F}	1^{P}	2^{F}	2^{P}	Ret^{P}^{F}	1^{P}	Ret^{P}^{F}	Ret^{P}	164
1	(United Kingdom) Williams-Renault	6	2	2	2^{F}	Ret	2^{F}	3	Ret	2	2	8^{F}^{†}	Ret^{P}	3	5	Ret	1	Ret	164
2	(United Kingdom) McLaren-Honda	1	3	Ret	Ret	9^{†}	3	1	Ret^{P}	Ret	Ret	2	1	5	1	3^{F}	Ret	Ret	99
2	(United Kingdom) McLaren-Honda	2	5	4^{F}	Ret	4	Ret	Ret	1^{F}	Ret	5	Ret	3	Ret	4	2	2	1	99
3	(United Kingdom) Benetton-Ford	19	4	3	3	2	Ret	4	2	Ret	4	3	Ret	1^{F}	3	7	Ret	2^{F}	91
3	(United Kingdom) Benetton-Ford	20	Ret	Ret	Ret	Ret	4	5	Ret	3	3	4	5	4	2	4	3	3	91
4	(Italy) Ferrari	27	Ret	Ret	4	3	Ret	Ret	3	Ret	Ret	5	Ret	Ret	Ret	Ret	5	4	21
4	(Italy) Ferrari	28	Ret	Ret	5	10^{†}	Ret	Ret	Ret	Ret	9	Ret	6	Ret	Ret	Ret	12	11	21
5	(United Kingdom) Lotus-Ford	11	9	6	10	Ret	DNQ	Ret	Ret	4	6	Ret	4	6	Ret	5	Ret	7	13
5	(United Kingdom) Lotus-Ford	12	6	7	Ret	Ret	Ret	Ret	Ret	6	Ret	Ret	Ret	13^{†}	Ret	Ret	Ret	13	13
6	(United Kingdom) Tyrrell-Ilmor	3	Ret	Ret	Ret	Ret	8	Ret	12	11	11	Ret	Ret	Ret	Ret	Ret	Ret	Ret	8
6	(United Kingdom) Tyrrell-Ilmor	4	Ret	5	Ret	Ret	14^{†}	Ret	5	Ret	Ret	Ret	8	8	6	9	4	Ret	8
7	(United Kingdom) Footwork-Mugen-Honda	9	10	13	6	5	5	7	7	7	7	9	7	Ret	7	6	15	Ret	6
7	(United Kingdom) Footwork-Mugen-Honda	10	8	DNQ	Ret	7	10	11	DNQ	Ret	12	Ret	Ret	9	Ret	10	8	8	6
8	(France) Ligier-Renault	25	Ret	10	Ret	Ret	Ret	12	10	Ret	10	7	Ret	Ret	Ret	8	Ret	5	6
8	(France) Ligier-Renault	26	7	9	Ret	Ret	9	10	6	5	8	6	Ret	DNQ	Ret	Ret	Ret	Ret	6
9	(United Kingdom) March-Ilmor	16	Ret	Ret	Ret	8	12	Ret	4	Ret	Ret	16	Ret	11	10	Ret	Ret	12	3
9	(United Kingdom) March-Ilmor	17	DNQ	DNQ	DNQ	12	13	DNQ	14	DNQ	DNQ	13	9	12	Ret	11	13	Ret	3
10	(Italy) BMS Dallara-Ferrari	21	Ret	8	8	Ret	11^{†}	9	9	9	13	10	DNQ	7	11^{†}	Ret	9	Ret	2
10	(Italy) BMS Dallara-Ferrari	22	Ret	Ret	Ret	6	6	Ret	8	10	15	11	Ret	Ret	8	Ret	10	Ret	2
11	(Republic of Ireland) Jordan-Yamaha	32	DNQ	Ret	Ret	DNQ	Ret	Ret	Ret	Ret	Ret	DNQ	Ret	15	DNQ	13	7	6	1
11	(Republic of Ireland) Jordan-Yamaha	33	11	Ret	Ret	Ret	7	Ret	Ret	Ret	Ret	15	10	14	Ret	Ret	Ret	Ret	1
12	(Italy) Minardi-Lamborghini	23	Ret	Ret	Ret	11	Ret	8	13	DNQ	DNQ	Ret	DNQ	DNQ	DNQ	12	6	9	1
12	(Italy) Minardi-Lamborghini	24	Ret	Ret	7	Ret	Ret	Ret	11	8	17^{†}	12	DNQ	16	Ret	14	14	10	1
13	(France) Venturi-Lamborghini	29	Ret	11	Ret	Ret	Ret	6	DSQ	Ret	Ret	14	Ret	18^{†}	Ret	Ret	Ret	Ret	1
13	(France) Venturi-Lamborghini	30	12	12	9	DNQ	Ret	DNPQ	Ret	Ret	Ret	Ret	Ret	17	9^{†}	Ret	11	Ret	1
—	(Italy) Fondmetal-Ford	14	DNQ	Ret	DNQ	Ret	DNQ	DNQ	DNQ	Ret	DNQ	DNQ	Ret	10	Ret				0
—	(Italy) Fondmetal-Ford	15	Ret	Ret	Ret	Ret	Ret	Ret	Ret	Ret	14	Ret	Ret	Ret	Ret				0
—	(United Kingdom) Brabham-Judd	7	13	DNQ	DNQ	DNQ	DNQ	DNQ	DNQ	DNQ	DNQ	DNQ							0
—	(United Kingdom) Brabham-Judd	8	DNQ	DNQ	DNQ	DNQ	DNQ	DNQ	DNQ	DNQ	16	DNQ	11						0
—	(Italy) Andrea Moda-Judd	34	EX	DNP	DNPQ	DNPQ	DNPQ	Ret	DNPQ	DNA	DNPQ	DNPQ	DNQ	DNQ					0
—	(Italy) Andrea Moda-Judd	35	EX	DNP	EX	DNPQ	DNPQ	DNPQ	DNP	DNA	DNPQ	EX	DNPQ	DNQ					0
Pos.	Constructor	No.	RSA (South Africa)	MEX (Mexico)	BRA (Brazil)	ESP (Spain)	SMR (Italy)	MON (Monaco)	CAN (Canada)	FRA (France)	GBR (United Kingdom)	GER (Germany)	HUN (Hungary)	BEL (Belgium)	ITA (Italy)	POR (Portugal)	JPN (Japan)	AUS (Australia)	Points

Notes:

- † – Driver did not finish the Grand Prix but was classified, as they completed more than 90% of the race distance.

== Non-championship event results ==
The 1992 season also included a single event which did not count towards the World Championship, the Formula One Indoor Trophy at the Bologna Motor Show.

Race name	Venue	Date	Winning driver	Constructor	Report
(Italy) Formula One Indoor Trophy	Bologna Motor Show	7–8 December	(United Kingdom) Johnny Herbert	(United Kingdom) Lotus	Report
