= Benetton B192 =

Formula One racing car

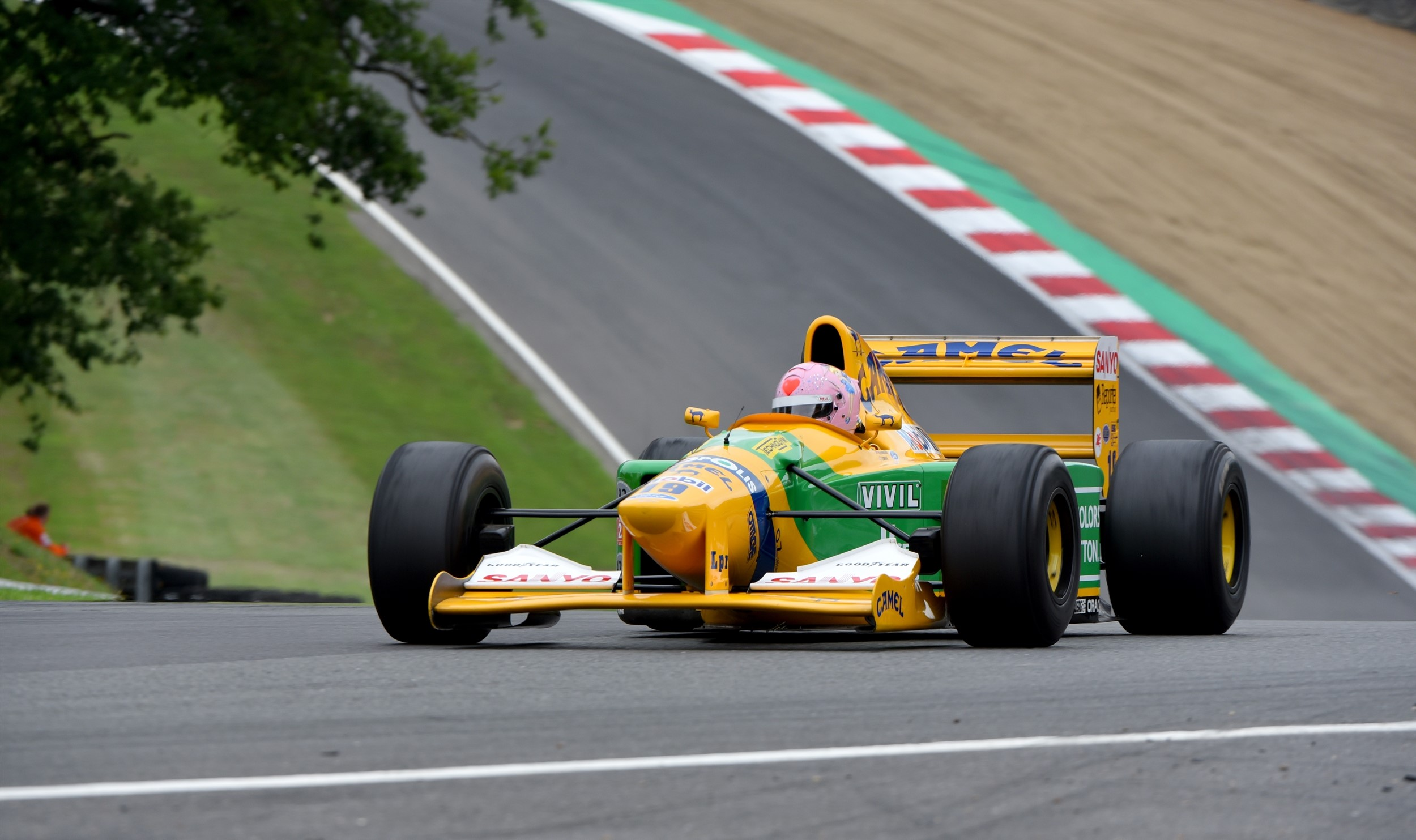
- The B192 of Michael Schumacher during the 2018 Festival Italia at Brands Hatch circuit
- Category: Formula One
- Constructor: Benetton
- Designers: Ross Brawn (Technical Director); Rory Byrne (Chief Designer); Frank Dernie (Chief Engineer); Pat Symonds (Head of R&D); Richard Marshall (Head of Electronics); Willem Toet (Head of Aerodynamics); Geoff Goddard (Chief Engine Designer) (Ford-Cosworth)
- Predecessor: B191
- Successor: B193

Technical specifications
- Chassis: Carbon fibre monocoque
- Suspension (front): Double wishbone, pushrod
- Suspension (rear): Double wishbone, pushrod
- Engine: Ford HBA7, 3,498 cc (213.5 cu in), 75° V8, NA, mid-engine, longitudinally-mounted
- Transmission: Benetton transverse 6-speed Manual Transmission
- Power: 660–680 bhp (492–507 kW; 669–689 PS) @ 12,000-13,000 rpm
- Fuel: Mobil
- Tyres: Goodyear

Competition history
- Notable entrants: Camel Benetton Ford
- Notable drivers: 19. (Germany) Michael Schumacher; 20. (United Kingdom) Martin Brundle
- Debut: 1992 Spanish Grand Prix
- First win: 1992 Belgian Grand Prix
- Last win: 1992 Belgian Grand Prix
- Last event: 1992 Australian Grand Prix
Races	Wins	Podiums	Poles	F/Laps
13	1	11	0	2
- Constructors' Championships: 0
- Drivers' Championships: 0

The Benetton B192 is a Formula One racing car designed by Ross Brawn, Rory Byrne and Willem Toet and raced by the Benetton team in the 1992 Formula One season.

The car had a delayed start in 1992, being debuted at the Spanish Grand Prix while the team made do with an upgraded version of the B191 for the opening three rounds.

== Competition history ==
The car was quite competitive with Michael Schumacher and Martin Brundle scoring several podiums with it. Schumacher, in his first full F1 season, came of age as a Grand Prix driver when he won the rain-affected Belgian Grand Prix after a clever pit strategy put him in the lead after dropping behind Brundle with a brief off and realizing upon seeing Brundle's tyres that the wets were blistering as the track dried. Brundle came close to a possible victory at the Canadian Grand Prix, chasing race leader Gerhard Berger until a transmission issue ended his bid at winning the race. Schumacher would finish the season third in the standings, Brundle sixth.

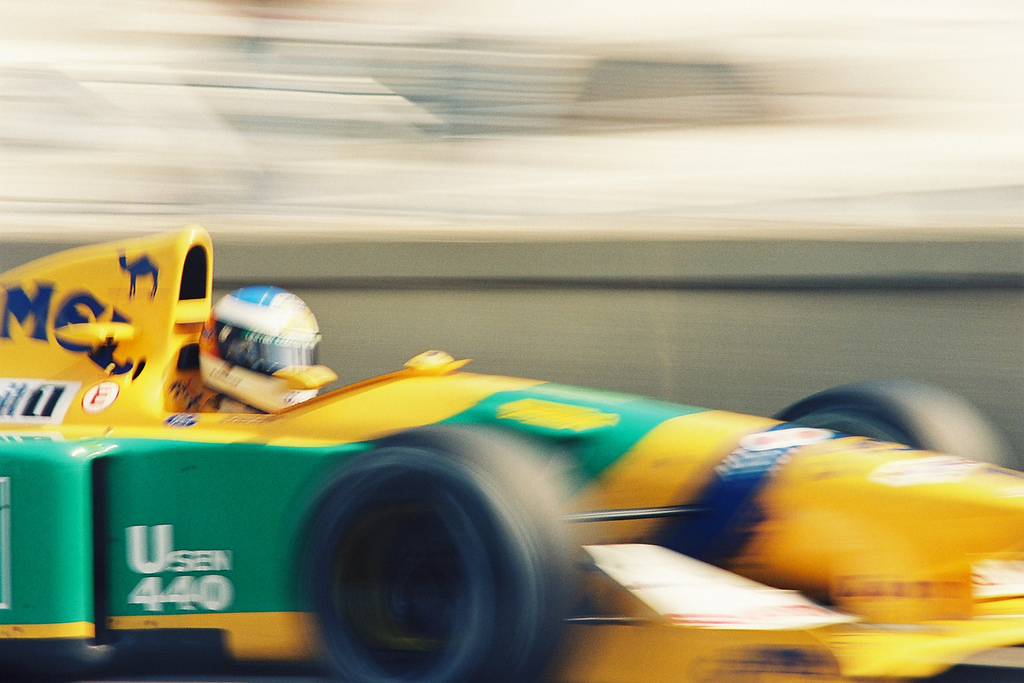
Schumacher driving the B192 at the 1992 Monaco Grand Prix.

The car had a nimble chassis, which made the most of the disadvantages it inherited with the Ford V8. It did not contain active suspension, ABS, traction control, and a semi-automatic gearbox.

When Martin Brundle drove the B192 again in 2008 at Silverstone, he recalled that although it was slightly tail-happy, it was very comfortable to drive and said of it "...I can live with it, it's great!". It was a substantial improvement over the previous year's car which Brundle described as being "very heavy on the steering", "a real challenge to drive ... and sometimes it felt like a bathtub with a loose wheel".

Benetton finished third in the Constructors' Championship in 1992 after scoring points in every race of the season, with Schumacher finishing third in the Drivers' Championship with 53 points, ahead of reigning world champion Ayrton Senna, who won three races to Schumacher's one but who struggled with retirements.

== Legacy ==
Although not held in awe like some of its more successful contemporaries, the B192 was recognised as a step forward for the Benetton team. Rory Byrne's philosophy of "evolution not revolution" meant that many of this car's features were integrated into the design of Schumacher's title-winning '94 and '95 Benettons. Schumacher's win at Belgium would also prove to be the last win for a Formula One car using a conventional manual transmission.

In 2026, B192 chassis B192-05 (with which Schumacher took his first victory in Belgium) was sold for €5,082,000 at Broad Arrow Auctions online sale.

1992 Benetton-Ford B192
Benetton-Ford B192 at Goodwood Festival of Speed 2009

== BOSS GP ==
The B192 was used in the BOSS GP Series, driven by Patrick d’Aubreby and won the Open Class title in 2005.

== Complete Formula One results ==
(key) (results in italics indicate fastest lap)

Year	Entrant	Engine	Tyres	Driver	1	2	3	4	5	6	7	8	9	10	11	12	13	14	15	16	Pts.	WCC
1992	Camel Benetton Ford	Ford HBA5 / HBA7; V8	G		RSA	MEX	BRA	ESP	SMR	MON	CAN	FRA	GBR	GER	HUN	BEL	ITA	POR	JPN	AUS	91*	3rd
1992	Camel Benetton Ford	Ford HBA5 / HBA7; V8	G	Michael Schumacher				2	Ret	4	2	Ret	4	3	Ret	1	3	7	Ret	2	91*	3rd
1992	Camel Benetton Ford	Ford HBA5 / HBA7; V8	G	Martin Brundle				Ret	4	5	Ret	3	3	4	5	4	2	4	3	3	91*	3rd

* 11 points scored using the Benetton B191B
