= John Barnard (biographer) =

Biographer

John Barnard or Bernard, D.D. (baptised 10 November 1628 – 17 August 1683), was an English cleric and academic, known as the biographer of Peter Heylyn, his father-in-law.

== Life ==
Barnard was the son of John Barnard, and was born at Caistor, Lincolnshire. He was educated at the grammar school of his native place, and at Cambridge, where he was a pensioner of Queens' College. In 1648 he went to the University of Oxford, where, by preferment of the board of visitors, he was granted the degree of B.A. on 15 April, and on 29 September following was presented to a fellowship of Lincoln College. In 1651 he proceeded to his M.A. degree, and became then for some time a preacher in and near Oxford. He married, and purchased the perpetual advowson of the living of Waddington, near Lincoln, which he held for some time, together with that of Gedney, also in Lincolnshire.

Conforming after the Restoration, Barnard was made prebendary of Asgardby in Lincoln Cathedral on 13 April 1672, and in the year 1669 was granted the degrees of B.D. and D.D. in succession.

Barnard died aged 54 on 17 August 1683 at Newark-on-Trent, while on a journey to the Spa, and was buried in his own church at Waddington.

== Works ==
Barnard was the author of:

- Censura Cleri, against scandalous ministers not fit to be restored to the church's livings in prudence, piety, and fame, an anonymous pamphlet published at the end of 1659 or beginning of 1660, "to prevent such from being restored to their livings as had been ejected by the godly party in 1654–55". Anthony Wood wrote that Barnard did not wish to be known as its author.
- Theologo-Historicus, a true life of the most reverend divine and excellent historian, Peter Heylyn, D.D., sub-dean of Windsor (London, 1683). This was published, according to the author, against George Vernon, M.A., rector of Burton in Gloucester, who had brought out a life of Heylyn in 1682. Printed with it was another reply, to Richard Baxter.

Barnard also wrote a catechism for the use of his parish, and left a manuscript tract against Socinianism, which was not printed.

== Family ==
Barnard married, at Abingdon-on-Thames in 1657, Lettice (Letitia) Heylyn, daughter of Peter Heylyn. John Barnard the Jacobite was their son.
