= 1985 Curaçao Grand Prix =

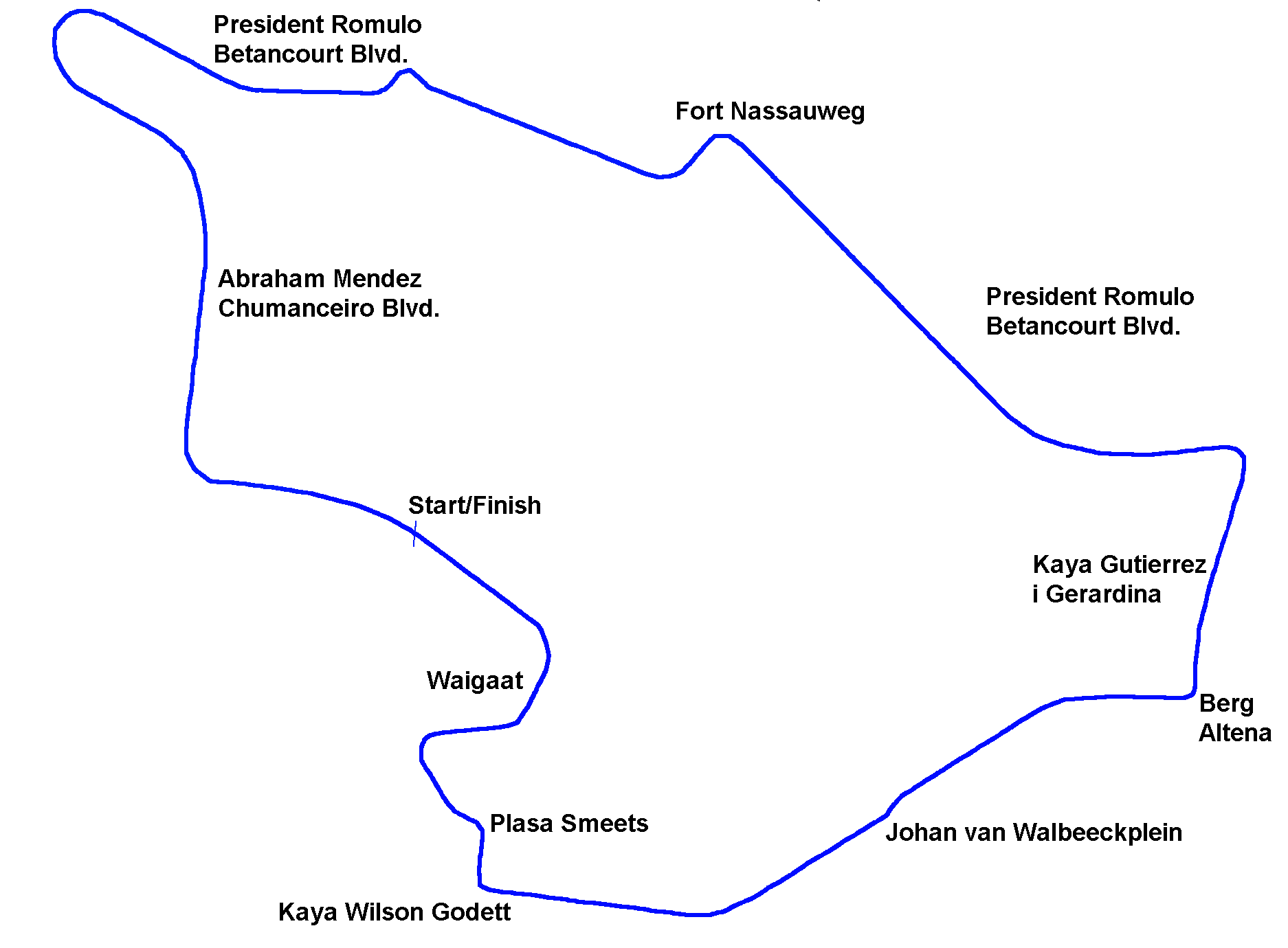

Race details
- Date: 13 October 1985
- Official name: Curaçao Grand Prix
- Location: Willemstad Street Circuit
- Course: Asphalt
- Course length: 3.550 km (2.206 miles)
- Distance: 58 laps, 205.900 km (128,687 miles)
- Weather: Overcast

Pole position
Driver	(New Zealand) Mike Thackwell	Ralt Racing
- Time: 1:41.895

Fastest lap
Driver	(Denmark) John Nielsen	Ralt Racing
- Time: 1:44.725

Podium
First	(Denmark) John Nielsen	Ralt Racing
Second	(Italy) Ivan Capelli	Genoa Racing
Third	(Italy) Claudio Langes	Eddie Jordan Racing

The 1985 Curaçao Grand Prix was a one-off Formula 3000 race held in Willemstad, Curaçao on 13 October 1985. The race was organised by the SCCA. The Grand Prix was run in the streets of the city. As the track was very slippery the cars initially used wet weather tires. During the race the cars ran on qualifier tires. John Nielsen won the 58 lap race with a 21-second lead over Ivan Capelli.

== Results ==
=== Qualifying ===
Pos.	No.	Driver	Team	Chassis	Time	Grid
1	1	(New Zealand) Mike Thackwell	Ralt Racing	Ralt RB20	1:41.895	1
2	34	(Italy) Ivan Capelli	Genoa Racing	March 85B	1:43.023	2
3	2	(Denmark) John Nielsen	Ralt Racing	Ralt RB20	1:43.213	3
4	8	(Germany) Christian Danner	BS Automotive	March 85B	1:43.696	4
5	25	(Italy) Claudio Langes	Eddie Jordan Racing	March 85B	1:43.760	5
6	33	(Italy) Guido Daccò	Sanremo Racing	March 85B	1:45.890	6
7	35	(France) Alain Ferté	Onyx Race Engineering	March 85B	1:46.174	7
8	7	(United Kingdom) Johnny Dumfries	BS Automotive	March 85B	1:46.590	8
9	9	(Italy) Emanuele Pirro	Onyx Race Engineering	March 85B	1:46.751	9
10	14	(Italy) Alessandro Santin	Sanremo Racing	March 85B	1:47.532	10
11	10	(Canada) John Jones	Onyx Race Engineering	March 85B	1:47.532	11
12	22	(Italy) Lamberto Leoni	Corbari Italia	March 85B	1:48.087	12
13	21	(Italy) Stefano Livio	Corbari Italia	March 85B	1:48.097	13
14	3	(France) Michel Ferté	Oreca	March 85B	1:48.647	14
15	15	(Italy) Gabriele Tarquini	Lola Motorsport	Lola T950	1:49.465	15
16	13	(Italy) Aldo Bertuzzi	Sanremo Racing	March 85B	1:49.984	16
17	16	(Italy) Fulvio Ballabio	Lola Motorsport	Lola T950	1:50.152	17
18	23	(United States) Eric Lang	Ekström Racing	March 85B	1:51.761	18
19	26	(Sweden) Slim Borgudd	Roger Cowman Racing	Arrows A6	1:53.656	19
20	4	(Austria) Pierre Chauvet	Oreca	March 85B	2:04.993	20

=== Race ===
Pos.	No.	Driver	Team	Chassis	Laps	Time/Retired	Grid
1	2	(Denmark) John Nielsen	Ralt Racing	Ralt RT20	58	1:41:29.572	3
2	34	(Italy) Ivan Capelli	Genoa Racing	March 85B	58	+ 21.400	2
3	25	(Italy) Claudio Langes	Eddie Jordan Racing	March 85B	58		5
4	8	(Germany) Christian Danner	BS Automotive	March 85B	58		4
5	35	(France) Alain Ferté	Onyx Race Engineering	March 85B	58		7
6	9	(Italy) Emanuele Pirro	Onyx Race Engineering	March 85B	57	+ 1 lap	9
7	14	(Italy) Alessandro Santin	Lola Motorsport	Lola T950	56	+ 2 laps	10
8	10	(Canada) John Jones	Onyx Race Engineering	March 85B	56	+ 2 laps	11
9	16	(Italy) Fulvio Ballabio	Sanremo Racing	March 85B	51	+ 7 laps	17
10	13	(Italy) Aldo Bertuzzi	Sanremo Racing	March 85B	51	+ 7 laps	16
NC	26	(Sweden) Slim Borgudd	Roger Cowman Racing	Arrows A6	35	Not classified	19
Ret	15	(Italy) Gabriele Tarquini	Lola Motorsport	Lola T950	49	Accident	15
Ret	3	(France) Michel Ferté	Oreca	March 85B	47	Electrics	14
Ret	22	(Italy) Lamberto Leoni	Combari Italia	March 85B	46	Brakes	12
Ret	33	(Italy) Guido Daccò	Sanremo Racing	March 85B	40	Gearbox	40
Ret	23	(United States) Eric Lang	Ekström Racing	March 85B	38	Engine	18
Ret	21	(Italy) Stefano Livio	Combari Italia	March 85B	37	Accident	13
Ret	7	(United Kingdom) Johnny Dumfries	BS Automotive	March 85B	32	Accident	8
Ret	4	(Austria) Pierre Chauvet	Oreca	March 85B	21	Accident	20
DNS	1	(New Zealand) Mike Thackwell	Ralt Racing	Ralt RT20	0	Electrics	1
Fastest Lap: (Denmark) John Nielsen (Ralt Racing) – 1:44.725

== Plans for potential Formula One race and demise ==
Around the same time the event organisers planned the event to become part of the Formula One calendar in the future. While the event was praised by press and public, the plans for Formula One race ended as the track would have needed substantial improvements to meet the FIA requirements to host Formula One event. A second Curaçao Grand Prix was scheduled as part of the 1986 International Formula 3000 Championship, but it was eventually dropped from the calendar.
