= John Nielsen (racing driver) =

Danish racing driver

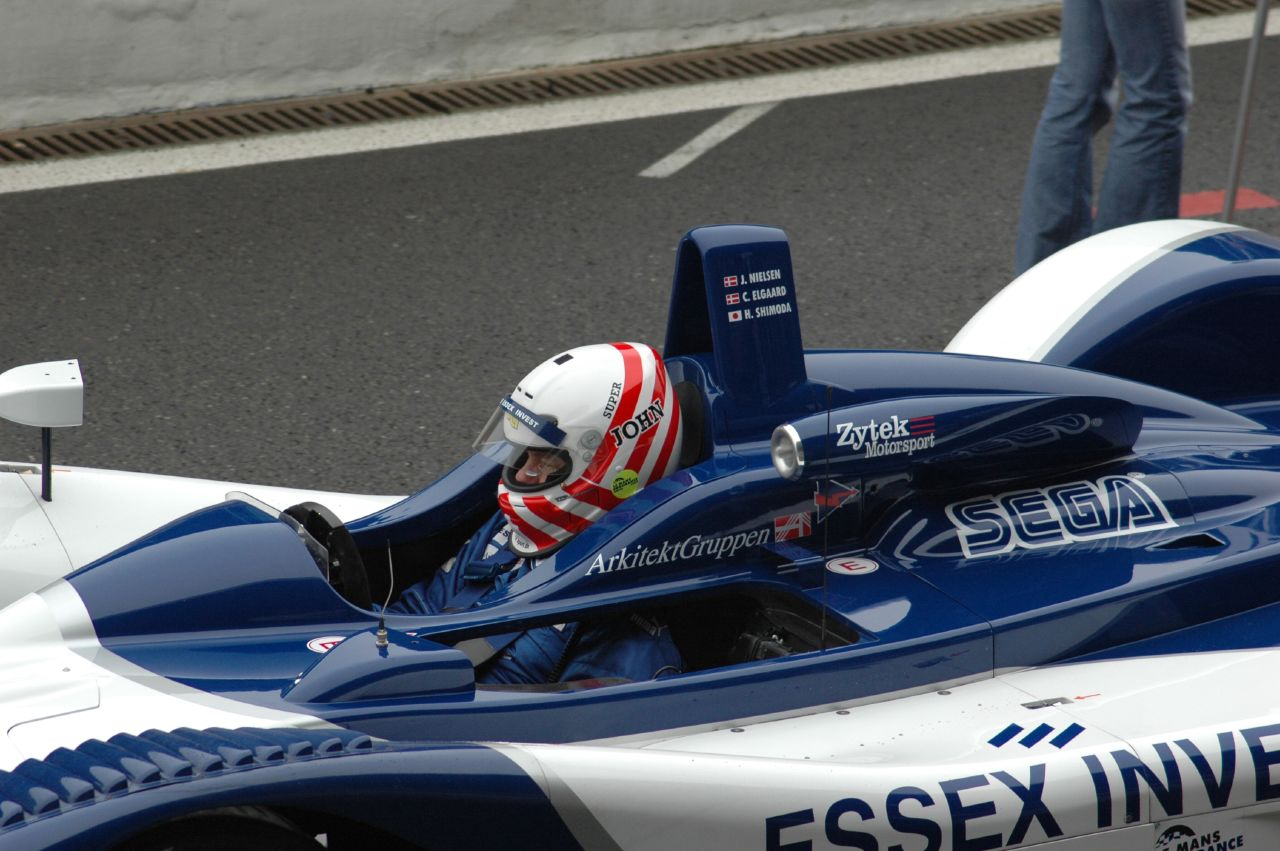
- John Nielsen on the grid in the winning #15 Zytek 04S at the 2005 1000km of Spa.
- Nationality: (Denmark) Danish
- Born: John Elgaard Nielsen; 7 February 1956 (age 70) Varde, Denmark

24 Hours of Le Mans career
- Years: 1986 – 1996, 1998, 2000 – 2001, 2003 – 2004, 2006, 2008
- Teams: Kouros Racing Team; Silk Cut Jaguar / TWR; Porsche Kremer Racing; Seikel Motorsport; West Competition / DPR; Nissan Motorsports / TWR; Den Blå Avis; RN Motorsport; Lister Racing; Team Essex
- Best finish: 1st (1990)
- Class wins: 1 (1990)

John Elgaard Nielsen (born 7 February 1956, in Varde) is a Danish former racing driver. He won the 24 Hours of Le Mans in 1990. Nielsen also won the 1996 All Japan Grand Touring Car Championship in the GT500 class.

Nielsen was born in Varde. Prior to his win at Le Mans, he won the 1984 Macau Grand Prix, and the 1985 Curaçao Grand Prix. He was also a three-time champion of the European Formula Super Vee Championship from 1979 to 1981. He is now a Formula 1 commentator for TV3+ in Denmark, but also works in public.

== Complete International Formula 3000 results ==
(key) (Races in bold indicate pole position; races in italics indicate fastest lap; small number denotes finishing position.)

| Year | Entrant | Chassis | Engine | 1 | 2 | 3 | 4 | 5 | 6 | 7 | 8 | 9 | 10 | 11 | 12 | Pos. | Pts |
|---|---|---|---|---|---|---|---|---|---|---|---|---|---|---|---|---|---|
| 1985 | Ralt Racing Ltd | Ralt RB20 | Cosworth V8 | SIL; 2 | THR; NC | EST; 1 | NÜR; C | VAL; 2 | PAU; Ret | SPA; Ret | **DIJ**; 3 | PER; Ret | ÖST; 2 | ZAN; 4 | DON; 13 | 4th | 34 |
| 1986 | Ralt Racing Ltd | Ralt RT20 | Honda V8 | SIL; 3^{‡} | VAL; Ret | PAU; Ret | SPA; 2 | IMO; Ret | MUG; Ret | PER; 6 | **ÖST**; 2 | BIR; 11 | BUG; 7 | JAR; 5 | | 6th | 17 |

^{‡} Half points awarded.

Nielsen also entered one non-championship F3000 race, the 1985 Curaçao Grand Prix. Driving the Ralt RB20 with Cosworth engine that he had used in that year's championship, he won the race and set the fastest lap.

== 24 Hours of Le Mans results ==
| Year | Team | Co-Drivers | Car | Class | Laps | Pos. | Class Pos. |
|---|---|---|---|---|---|---|---|
| 1986 | (Switzerland) Kouros Racing Team | (New Zealand) Mike Thackwell | Sauber C8-Mercedes | C1 | 61 | DNF | DNF |
| 1987 | (United Kingdom) Silk Cut Jaguar (United Kingdom) Tom Walkinshaw Racing | (United Kingdom) Martin Brundle | Jaguar XJR-8LM | C1 | 231 | DNF | DNF |
| 1988 | (United Kingdom) Silk Cut Jaguar (United Kingdom) Tom Walkinshaw Racing | (United Kingdom) Martin Brundle | Jaguar XJR-9LM | C1 | 306 | DNF | DNF |
| 1989 | (United Kingdom) Silk Cut Jaguar (United Kingdom) Tom Walkinshaw Racing | (United Kingdom) Andy Wallace (United States) Price Cobb | Jaguar XJR-9LM | C1 | 215 | DNF | DNF |
| 1990 | (United Kingdom) Silk Cut Jaguar (United Kingdom) Tom Walkinshaw Racing | (United States) Price Cobb (United Kingdom) Martin Brundle | Jaguar XJR-12 | C1 | 359 | **1st** | **1st** |
| 1991 | (United Kingdom) Silk Cut Jaguar (United Kingdom) Tom Walkinshaw Racing | (United Kingdom) Derek Warwick (United Kingdom) Andy Wallace | Jaguar XJR-12 | C2 | 356 | 4th | 4th |
| 1992 | (Germany) Porsche Kremer Racing | (Germany) Manuel Reuter (Italy) Giovanni Lavaggi | Porsche 962CK6 | C3 | 334 | 7th | **2nd** |
| 1993 | (United Kingdom) TWR Jaguar Racing | (Australia) David Brabham (United Kingdom) David Coulthard | Jaguar XJ220 | GT | 306 | DSQ | DSQ |
| 1994 | (Germany) Seikel Motorsport | (Germany) Thomas Bscher (United Kingdom) Lindsay Owen-Jones | Porsche 968 Turbo RS | GT2 | 84 | DNF | DNF |
| 1995 | (United Kingdom) West Competition (United Kingdom) David Price Racing | (Germany) Jochen Mass (Germany) Thomas Bscher | McLaren F1 GTR | GT1 | 131 | DNF | DNF |
| 1996 | (United Kingdom) West Competition (United Kingdom) David Price Racing | (Germany) Thomas Bscher (Netherlands) Peter Kox | McLaren F1 GTR | GT1 | 338 | 4th | **3rd** |
| 1998 | (Japan) Nissan Motorsports (United Kingdom) TWR | (Germany) Michael Krumm (France) Franck Lagorce | Nissan R390 GT1 | GT1 | 342 | 5th | 5th |
| 2000 | (Denmark) Team Den Blå Avis | (Italy) Mauro Baldi (Germany) Klaus Graf | Panoz LMP-1 Roadster-S-Élan | LMP900 | 205 | NC | NC |
| 2001 | (Denmark) Team Den Blå Avis (Japan) Team Goh | (Japan) Hiroki Katoh (Denmark) Casper Elgaard | Dome S101-Judd | LMP900 | 66 | DNF | DNF |
| 2003 | (United Kingdom) RN Motorsport | (Japan) Hayanari Shimoda (Denmark) Casper Elgaard | DBA4 03S-Zytek | LMP675 | 288 | 22nd | **2nd** |
| 2004 | (United Kingdom) Lister Racing | (Denmark) Casper Elgaard (Denmark) Jens Møller | Lister Storm LMP-Chevrolet | LMP1 | 279 | 24th | 9th |
| 2006 | (United Kingdom) Zytek Engineering (Denmark) Team Essex Invest | (Denmark) Casper Elgaard (Denmark) Philip Andersen | Zytek 06S | LMP1 | 269 | NC | NC |
| 2008 | (Denmark) Team Essex | (Denmark) Casper Elgaard (Germany) Sascha Maassen | Porsche RS Spyder Evo | LMP2 | 347 | 12th | **2nd** |

== Complete JGTC results ==
(key) (Races in bold indicate pole position) (Races in italics indicate fastest lap)

| Year | Team | Car | Class | 1 | 2 | 3 | 4 | 5 | 6 | DC | Pts |
|---|---|---|---|---|---|---|---|---|---|---|---|
| 1996 | Team Lark McLaren | McLaren F1 GTR | GT500 | SUZ; 2 | FUJ; 1 | SEN; 8 | **FUJ**; 2 | SUG; Ret | MIN; 4 | **1st** | **63** |

Sporting positions
| Preceded by Frank Jelinski | German Formula Three champion 1982 | Succeeded by Franz Konrad |
| Preceded by Ayrton Senna | Macau Grand Prix; Winner; 1984 | Succeeded by Maurício Gugelmin |
| Preceded by Jochen Mass; Manuel Reuter; Stanley Dickens | Winner of the 24 Hours of Le Mans; 1990 with: Price Cobb; Martin Brundle | Succeeded by Volker Weidler; Johnny Herbert; Bertrand Gachot |
| Preceded by None (1994) | BPR Global GT Series; Champion; 1995 with: Thomas Bscher | Succeeded by Ray Bellm; James Weaver |
| Preceded by Masahiko Kageyama | All-Japan Grand Touring Car Champion; 1996 with: David Brabham | Succeeded by Pedro de la Rosa; Michael Krumm |
