= 1984 Macau Grand Prix =

Formula Three motor race

Race details
Date	Leg 1: 17 Nov. 1984 Leg 2: 18 Nov. 1984
Location	Guia Circuit, Macau
Course	Temporary street circuit 6.120 km (3.803 mi)
Distance	Leg 1; 15 laps, 91.800 km (57.042 mi); Leg 2; 15 laps, 91.800 km (57.042 mi)
- Leg 1

Pole
Driver	(Sweden) Stefan Johansson
Time	2:22.95

Fastest Lap
Driver	(Denmark) John Nielsen
Time	2:23.47

Podium
First	(Sweden) Stefan Johansson
Second	(Denmark) John Nielsen
Third	(New Zealand) Mike Thackwell
- Leg 2

Pole
Driver	(Sweden) Stefan Johansson

Fastest Lap
Driver	(Denmark) John Nielsen
Time	2:22.93

Podium
First	(Denmark) John Nielsen
Second	(Sweden) Stefan Johansson
Third	(New Zealand) Mike Thackwell
- Overall Results
First	(Denmark) John Nielsen (1h 12m 26.48s)
Second	(Sweden) Stefan Johansson (1h 12m 28.63s)
Third	(New Zealand) Mike Thackwell (1h 12m 29.77s)

The 1984 Macau Grand Prix Formula Three was the 31st Macau Grand Prix race to be held on the streets of Macau on 18 November 1984.

== Entry list ==
Team	No	Driver	Vehicle	Engine
(Hong Kong) Marlboro Theodore Racing Team w/ West Surrey Racing	1	(Sweden) Stefan Johansson	Ralt RT3	Toyota
(Hong Kong) Marlboro Theodore Racing Team w/ West Surrey Racing	2	(Italy) Ivan Capelli	Ralt RT3	Toyota
(Hong Kong) Marlboro Theodore Racing Team w/ West Surrey Racing	3	(Italy) Emanuele Pirro	Ralt RT3	Toyota
(Italy) Trivellato Racing	5	(United Kingdom) Andrew Gilbert-Scott	Ralt RT3	Alfa Romeo
(Italy) Trivellato Racing	6	(Sweden) Slim Borgudd	Ralt RT3	Volkswagen
(United Kingdom) Team JPS w/ David Price Racing	7	(Colombia) Roberto Guerrero	Ralt RT3	Toyota
(United Kingdom) Team JPS w/ David Price Racing	8	(New Zealand) Mike Thackwell	Ralt RT3	Toyota
(United Kingdom) Team JPS w/ David Price Racing	9	(United Kingdom) Johnny Dumfries	Ralt RT3	Toyota
(Germany) Volkswagen Motorsport	10	(Denmark) John Nielsen	Ralt RT3	Volkswagen
(Germany) Volkswagen Motorsport	11	(Germany) Volker Weidler	Ralt RT3	Volkswagen
(France) New-Man	12	(France) Michel Ferté	Martini MK42	Alfa Romeo
(France) New-Man	14	(France) Paul Belmondo	Martini MK42	Alfa Romeo
(United Kingdom) Valour Racing	15	(United States) Ross Cheever	Ralt RT3	Volkswagen
(United Kingdom) Valour Racing	35	(United Kingdom) Paul Jackson	Ralt RT3	Toyota
(United Kingdom) Crown Motors Racing Team	16	(Sweden) Eje Elgh	Ralt RT3	Toyota
(Netherlands) Barron Racing Team	17	(Italy) Claudio Langes	Ralt RT3	Toyota
(United Kingdom) Mint Engineering	18	(United Kingdom) David Scott	Ralt RT3	Volkswagen
(United Kingdom) Murray Taylor Racing	19	(Switzerland) Mario Hytten	Ralt RT3	Volkswagen
(United Kingdom) Macau Excelsior by HK Mandarin	20	(Republic of Ireland) Tommy Byrne	Anson SA4	Volkswagen
(Italy) Ruggero Melgrati	21	(Italy) Ruggero Melgrati	Ralt RT3	Alfa Romeo
(Japan) Takeshi Project	22	(Japan) Hideshi Matsuda	March 793	Nissan
(Japan) Eiji Iwata	23	(Japan) Eiji Iwata	March 813	Toyota
(Italy) Scuderia Teutonia	24	(Austria) Franz Konrad	Anson SA4	Alfa Romeo
(Germany) Malte Bongers Racing	25	(Germany) Harald Brutschin	Ralt RT3	Alfa Romeo
(Switzerland) Formel Rennsport Club	26	(Switzerland) Jo Zeller	Ralt RT3	Toyota
(United Kingdom) Richard Trott Racing	27	(Sweden) Tomas Kaiser	Ralt RT3	Toyota
(United States) Flying Tigers Racing	28	(United States) Bob Earle	Ralt RT3	Toyota
(United States) Flying Tigers Racing	29	(United States) Eric Lang	Ralt RT3	Toyota
(United Kingdom) Acorn Computer Racing	30	(United Kingdom) David Hunt	Ralt RT3	Toyota
(Japan) Team Bardhal	31	(Japan) Hiroshi Nakayama	March 783	Toyota
(United Kingdom) Intersport Racing	66	(Canada) Allen Berg	Ralt RT3	Volkswagen

== Race results ==
=== Qualifying ===
Pos	No	Driver	Team	Time	Gap	Grid
1	1	(Sweden) Stefan Johansson	Theodore Racing	2:22.95		1
2	6	(Sweden) Slim Borgudd	Trivellato Racing	2:23.24	+ 0.29 s	2
3	8	(New Zealand) Mike Thackwell	Team JPS	2:23.53	+ 0.58 s	3
4	10	(Denmark) John Nielsen	Volkswagen Motorsport	2:23.57	+ 0.62 s	4
5	3	(Italy) Emanuele Pirro	Theodore Racing	2:23.59	+ 0.64 s	5
6	7	(Colombia) Roberto Guerrero	Team JPS	2:23.83	+ 0.88 s	6
7	17	(Italy) Claudio Langes	Barron Racing Team	2:23.90	+ 0.95 s	7
8	21	(Italy) Ruggero Melgrati	Ruggero Melgrati	2:24.36	+ 1.41 s	8
9	19	(Switzerland) Mario Hytten	Murray Taylor Racing	2:24.76	+ 1.81 s	9
10	2	(Italy) Ivan Capelli	Theodore Racing	2:24.89	+ 1.94 s	10
11	12	(France) Michel Ferté	New-Man	2:24.99	+ 2.04 s	11
12	20	(Republic of Ireland) Tommy Byrne	Macau Excelsior by HK Mandarin	2:25.04	+ 2.09 s	12
13	66	(Canada) Allen Berg	Intersport Racing	2:25.20	+ 2.25 s	13
14	15	(United States) Ross Cheever	Valour Racing	2:25.65	+ 2.70 s	14
15	9	(United Kingdom) Johnny Dumfries	Team JPS	2:25.68	+ 2.73 s	15
16	26	(Switzerland) Jo Zeller	Formel Rennsport Club	2:25.81	+ 2.86 s	16
17	11	(Germany) Volker Weidler	Volkswagen Motorsport	2:26.09	+ 3.14 s	17
18	28	(United States) Bob Earl	Flying Tigers Racing	2:26.16	+ 3.21 s	18
19	18	(United Kingdom) Dave Scott	Mint Engineering	2:26.19	+ 3.24 s	19
20	5	(United Kingdom) Andrew Gilbert-Scott	Trivellato Racing	2:26.46	+ 3.51 s	20
21	30	(United Kingdom) David Hunt	Acorn Computer Racing	2:26.57	+ 3.62 s	21
22	16	(Sweden) Eje Elgh	Crown Motors Racing Team	2:26.78	+ 3.83 s	22
23	27	(Sweden) Tomas Kaiser	Richard Trott Racing	2:27.25	+ 4.30 s	23
24	25	(Germany) Harald Brutschin	Malte Bongers Racing	2:27.82	+ 4.87 s	24
25	29	(United States) Eric Lang	Flying Tigers Racing	2:28.30	+ 5.35 s	25
26	24	(Austria) Franz Konrad	Scuderia Teutonia	2:28.51	+ 5.56 s	26
27	14	(France) Paul Belmondo	New-Man	2:29.54	+ 6.59 s	27
28	35	(United Kingdom) Paul Jackson	Valour Racing	2:29.95	+ 7.00 s	28
29	23	(Japan) Eiji Iwata	Eiji Iwata	2:34.32	+ 11.37 s	29
30	22	(Japan) Hideshi Matsuda	Takeshi Project	2:39.44	+ 16.49 s	30
31	31	(Japan) Hiroshi Nakayama	Team Bardhal	2:49.54	+ 26.59 s	31

=== Race ===
Pos.	No.	Driver	Team	Laps	Race Time
1	10	(Denmark) John Nielsen	Volkswagen Motorsport	30	1:12:26.480
2	1	(Sweden) Stefan Johansson	Theodore Racing	30	+2.150
3	8	(New Zealand) Mike Thackwell	Team JPS	30	+3.290
4	11	(Germany) Volker Weidler	Volkswagen Motorsport	30	+48.350
5	2	(Italy) Ivan Capelli	Theodore Racing	30	+59.500
6	6	(Sweden) Slim Borgudd	Trivellato Racing	30	+1:25.190
7	5	(United Kingdom) Andrew Gilbert-Scott	Trivellato Racing	30	+1:29.030
8	20	(Republic of Ireland) Tommy Byrne	Macau Excelsior by HK Mandarin	30	+1:30.500
9	7	(Colombia) Roberto Guerrero	Team JPS	30	+1:53.330
10	18	(United Kingdom) Dave Scott	Mint Engineering	30	+2:08.580
11	28	(United States) Bob Earl	Flying Tigers Racing	30	+2:15.790
12	25	(Germany) Harald Brutschin	Malte Bongers Racing	30	+2:20.760
13	14	(France) Paul Belmondo	New-Man	30	+2:33.640
14	29	(United States) Eric Lang	Flying Tigers Racing	30	+2:41.440
15	16	(Sweden) Eje Elgh	Crown Motors Racing Team	30	+2:55.760
16	26	(Switzerland) Jo Zeller	Formel Rennsport Club	30	+3:38.000
17	3	(Italy) Emanuele Pirro	Theodore Racing	29	+1 lap
18	66	(Canada) Allen Berg	Intersport Racing	29	+1 lap
19	24	(Austria) Franz Konrad	Scuderia Teutonia	28	+2 laps
20	22	(Japan) Hideshi Matsuda	Takeshi Project	28	+2 laps
DNF	27	(Sweden) Tomas Kaiser	Richard Trott Racing	23	-
DNF	19	(Switzerland) Mario Hytten	Murray Taylor Racing	23	-
DNF	17	(Italy) Claudio Langes	Barron Racing Team	17	-
DNF	21	(Italy) Ruggero Melgrati	Ruggero Melgrati	15	-
DNF	31	(Japan) Hiroshi Nakayama	Team Bardhal	14	-
DNF	23	(Japan) Eiji Iwata	Eiji Iwata	14	-
DNF	9	(United Kingdom) Johnny Dumfries	Team JPS	13	-
DNF	12	(France) Michel Ferté	New-Man	9	-
DNF	30	(United Kingdom) David Hunt	Acorn Computer Racing	1	-
DNS	35	(United Kingdom) Paul Jackson	Valour Racing	-	-
DNF	15	(United States) Ross Cheever	Valour Racing	-	-
