= Ferrari F92A =

1992 Formula One racing car by Ferrari

Ferrari F92A Ferrari F92AT
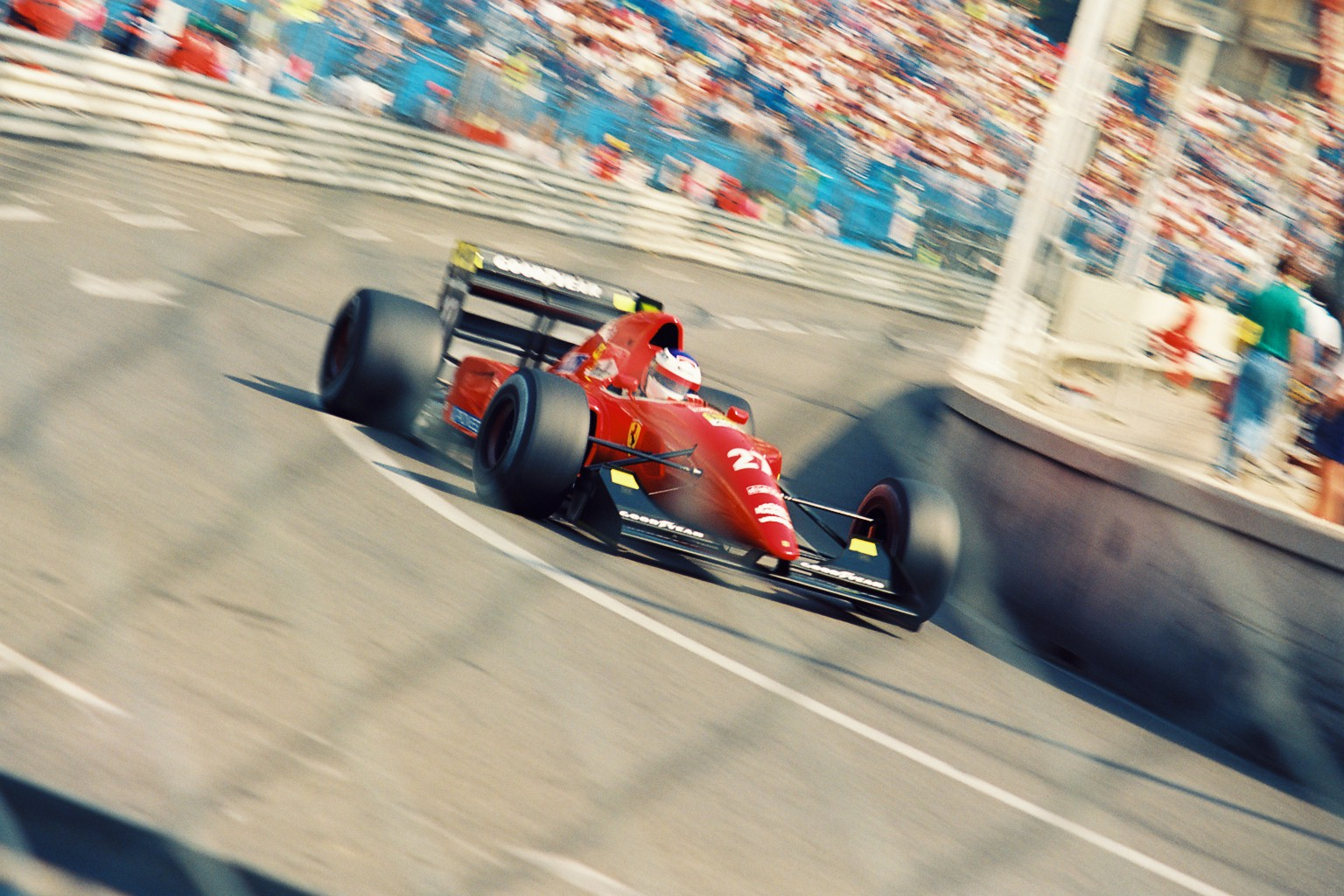
- Jean Alesi driving the F92A at the 1992 Monaco Grand Prix
- Category: Formula One
- Constructor: Ferrari
- Designers: Steve Nichols (Technical Director); Jean-Claude Migeot (Chief Designer); Gianfranco Ciampolini (Head of Electronics); Paolo Massai (Engine Department Director)
- Predecessor: 643
- Successor: F93A

Technical specifications
- Chassis: Carbon fibre monocoque
- Suspension (front): Double wishbones, torsion arms
- Suspension (rear): Double wishbones, torsion arms
- Engine: Ferrari Tipo 038 (E1 A-92), 3,497 cc (213.4 cu in), 65° V12, NA, mid-engine, longitudinally-mounted
- Transmission: Ferrari 6-speed (F92A); 7-speed (F92AT) semi-automatic
- Power: 735 hp (548.1 kW) @ 14,800 rpm
- Fuel: Agip
- Tyres: Goodyear

Competition history
- Notable entrants: Scuderia Ferrari SpA
- Notable drivers: 27. (France) Jean Alesi; 28. (Italy) Ivan Capelli; 28. (Italy) Nicola Larini
- Debut: 1992 South African Grand Prix
- Last event: 1992 Australian Grand Prix
Races	Wins	Podiums	Poles	F/Laps
16	0	2	0	0

The Ferrari F92A was a Formula One car designed by Jean-Claude Migeot for Ferrari for use in the 1992 Formula One season. There were two versions of the car, the original version raced in the first eleven races of the season, with the updated F92AT version racing in the latter stages of the season. The car was driven by Jean Alesi for the entire season, and by Ivan Capelli for most of the season, before he was sacked and replaced by Nicola Larini.

== Overview ==
The car was most famous for its "double-flat bottom" floor which produced a competitive level of downforce, but it was hamstrung by the Ferrari V12 engine which suffered excessive blow-by, reckoned to cost the team up to 50bhp. With Ferrari notorious for silencing any criticism of their powerplant, the F92A's failings were blamed on the revolutionary chassis being too difficult to drive instead. The car also featured Ferrari's first 'raised nose' design which allowed better airflow underneath the car. The car only achieved two podiums and a total of 21 points. The F92AT version was introduced at a test day in August held at the Autodromo Nazionale Monza circuit and first appeared in the championship at the Grand Prix of Belgium. The new version incorporated a seven-speed transverse gearbox, with a modified front suspension. It also included a more rigid engine mounting system and an up-to-date version of the underwing. The best results were two third places by Jean Alesi.

The F92AT driven late in the season by Nicola Larini carried the team's first attempt at an active suspension. This gave Larini's car a 30 kg weight disadvantage to teammate Jean Alesi's version. This was too much for Larini and the team to overcome, with Larini only placing 12th and 11th in his only drives with the team.

The F92AT was replaced for the 1993 season by the Ferrari F93A.

In 1992, the F92A was the first Formula One car with which Alessandro Nannini conducted a test session at the Fiorano Circuit, after recovering sufficiently from his helicopter crash injuries that ended his career in the category, in October 1990.

== Criticism ==
Capelli later said in an interview that the F92A was the worst F1 car he raced in his career.

== Performance ==
In the 8/11/1992 Motor 16 review they found the Ferrari F92A performance of:

0 - 100 kph	2.5 s
0 - 200 kph	4.9 s
Est. 0 - 60 mph	2.4 s
Top speed	330 kph (205 mph)

== Other ==
On 16 August 2013, Codemasters announced that the F92A would be one of several Ferrari F1 cars set to feature in the classic edition of F1 2013. Alesi and Capelli are the listed drivers of the car within the game.

== Complete Formula One results ==
(key)

Year	Team	Engine	Tyres	Drivers	1	2	3	4	5	6	7	8	9	10	11	12	13	14	15	16	Pts.	WCC
1992	Scuderia Ferrari	Ferrari Tipo 038 (E1 A-92); V12	G		RSA	MEX	BRA	ESP	SMR	MON	CAN	FRA	GBR	GER	HUN	BEL	ITA	POR	JPN	AUS	21	4th
1992	Scuderia Ferrari	Ferrari Tipo 038 (E1 A-92); V12	G	Jean Alesi	Ret	Ret	4	3	Ret	Ret	3	Ret	Ret	5	Ret	Ret	Ret	Ret	5	4	21	4th
1992	Scuderia Ferrari	Ferrari Tipo 038 (E1 A-92); V12	G	Ivan Capelli	Ret	Ret	5	10	Ret	Ret	Ret	Ret	9	Ret	6	Ret	Ret	Ret			21	4th
1992	Scuderia Ferrari	Ferrari Tipo 038 (E1 A-92); V12	G	Nicola Larini															12	11	21	4th
