= 1992 Monaco Grand Prix =

Coordinates: 43°44′4.74″N 7°25′16.8″E

- Race 6 of 16 in the 1992 Formula One World Championship
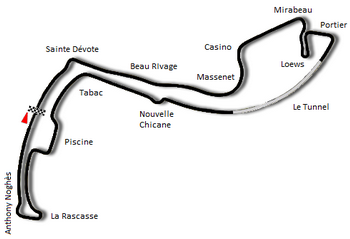

Race details
- Date: 31 May 1992
- Official name: 50ème Grand Prix de Monaco
- Location: Circuit de Monaco, Monte Carlo
- Course: Temporary street circuit
- Course length: 3.328 km (2.068 miles)
- Distance: 78 laps, 259.584 km (161.298 miles)
- Weather: Dry

Pole position
| Driver | (United Kingdom) Nigel Mansell | Williams-Renault |
- Time: 1:19.495

Fastest lap
| Driver | (United Kingdom) Nigel Mansell | Williams-Renault |
- Time: 1:21.598 on lap 74

Podium
| First | (Brazil) Ayrton Senna | McLaren-Honda |
| Second | (United Kingdom) Nigel Mansell | Williams-Renault |
| Third | (Italy) Riccardo Patrese | Williams-Renault |

The 1992 Monaco Grand Prix (formally the 50ème Grand Prix de Monaco) was a Formula One motor race held on 31 May 1992 at the Circuit de Monaco. It was the sixth race of the 1992 Formula One World Championship.

The 78-lap race was won by Ayrton Senna, driving a McLaren-Honda. Drivers' Championship leader Nigel Mansell took pole position in his Williams-Renault and led until lap 71, when he suspected he had a puncture and made a pit stop for new tyres. He emerged behind Senna, closed up to the Brazilian and tried to find a way past but without success, Senna holding on to win by 0.2 seconds. It was Senna's fifth Monaco Grand Prix win, equalling the record set by Graham Hill.

Mansell's teammate Riccardo Patrese was third, half a minute behind, with the top six completed by the Benettons of Michael Schumacher and Martin Brundle and the Larrousse of Bertrand Gachot.

== Pre-race ==
After the first five races of the championship, Williams driver Nigel Mansell lead the Drivers Championship by 26 points having achieved five race wins in a row. Team-mate Riccardo Patrese was second with 24 points. The Williams team was leading the Constructors Championship with 74 points; second-placed Benetton had 20, with their driver Michael Schumacher in third place. Reigning World Champion Ayrton Senna of McLaren was only in fourth place, having accumulated eight points. However, the Monaco Grand Prix had only been won in the last eight years by either Ayrton Senna or Alain Prost, but Nigel Mansell was looking to achieve his first win at Monaco. There were no changes to the driver line-up from the previous race, however before the race Ferrari President Luca di Montezemolo had to publicly announce Ivan Capelli's position within the Ferrari team was "safe" in response to criticism from the Italian Autosprint magazine about Capelli's recent performances. Autosport had also reported on the Thursday before the race that Capelli was "about to be replaced" according to "Italian rumours", highlighting the fact Gianni Morbidelli had carried out most of Ferrari's testing work at the Imola circuit before the Monaco race. Ferrari had released a statement in response to Morbidelli's testing of the Ferrari F92A saying Capelli had been "on holiday" but Capelli denied this was the case. Team Lotus also brought a second new 107 chassis for Mika Häkkinen at Monaco as only one 107 had been available for Herbert at San Marino. The car had been "shaken down" at Hethel in Norfolk by Olivier Beretta before being taken to Monaco.

== Qualifying ==
=== Pre-qualifying report ===
The team still hadn't made a proper seat for me, so I had taken a beating inside the cockpit, but I kept my foot down and desperately tried to remember where the next corner was. I knew the tunnel was taken flat out on my first lap but as I came back into daylight at 170mph, I was being bounced around so badly, I had double vision and I vividly remember speeding toward the tyre barrier wondering if I should turn left or right. Anyway I was called back to the pits and that was my run for the day.

— Perry McCarthy sums up his Monaco pre-qualifying session.

The pre-qualifying session on the Thursday morning lasted for one hour and started at 8:00 local time, in warm and sunny weather conditions. Michele Alboreto was the fastest pre-qualifier in the Footwork for the second Grand Prix in succession. Bertrand Gachot also pre-qualified without drama for Larrousse, finishing second fastest, just over half a second slower than Alboreto. Brazilian Roberto Moreno finished third fastest despite a slight gearbox leak, promoting the Andrea Moda team into the main qualifying sessions for the first time. Andrea Chiesa was again the final pre-qualifier in fourth place in the Fondmetal, 0.57 of a second slower than Moreno.

The second Venturi Larrousse of Ukyo Katayama was slowed by a slight oil leak before the Japanese driver crashed at Tabac in the final minutes of the session, finishing with the fifth fastest time and becoming the only driver other than Moreno and Perry McCarthy to fail to pre-qualify in 1992. McCarthy drove three laps at the beginning of the session, still with his ill-fitting seat, before the Andrea Moda team ordered him back to the pits, as the team wanted his car to be ready as a spare for Moreno, should he have needed it.

=== Pre-qualifying classification ===
| Pos | No | Driver | Constructor | Time | Gap |
|---|---|---|---|---|---|
| 1 | 9 | (Italy) Michele Alboreto | Footwork-Mugen-Honda | 1:25.413 | |
| 2 | 29 | (France) Bertrand Gachot | Venturi-Lamborghini | 1:25.980 | +0.567 |
| 3 | 34 | (Brazil) Roberto Moreno | Andrea Moda-Judd | 1:27.186 | +1.773 |
| 4 | 14 | (Switzerland) Andrea Chiesa | Fondmetal-Ford | 1:27.756 | +2.343 |
| 5 | 30 | (Japan) Ukyo Katayama | Venturi-Lamborghini | 1:28.310 | +2.897 |
| 6 | 35 | (United Kingdom) Perry McCarthy | Andrea Moda-Judd | 17:05.924 | +15:35.511 |

=== Practice and qualifying report ===
Two practice sessions were held before the race; the first was held on Thursday morning, with the second held on Saturday morning. Both sessions lasted 1 hour and 45 minutes. The first practice session took place under warm and hazy weather conditions.

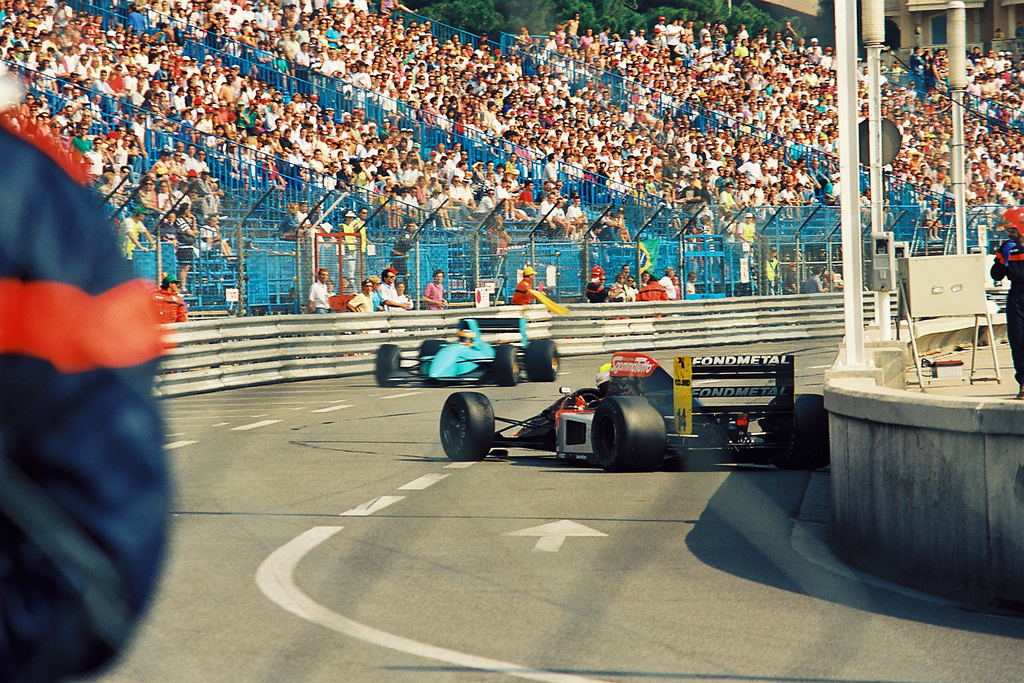
Andrea Chiesa's Fondmetal spins in front of Karl Wendlinger's March during the Thursday practice session. Chiesa failed to qualify as he finished 29th fastest, 0.715 seconds slower than Moreno's Andrea Moda.

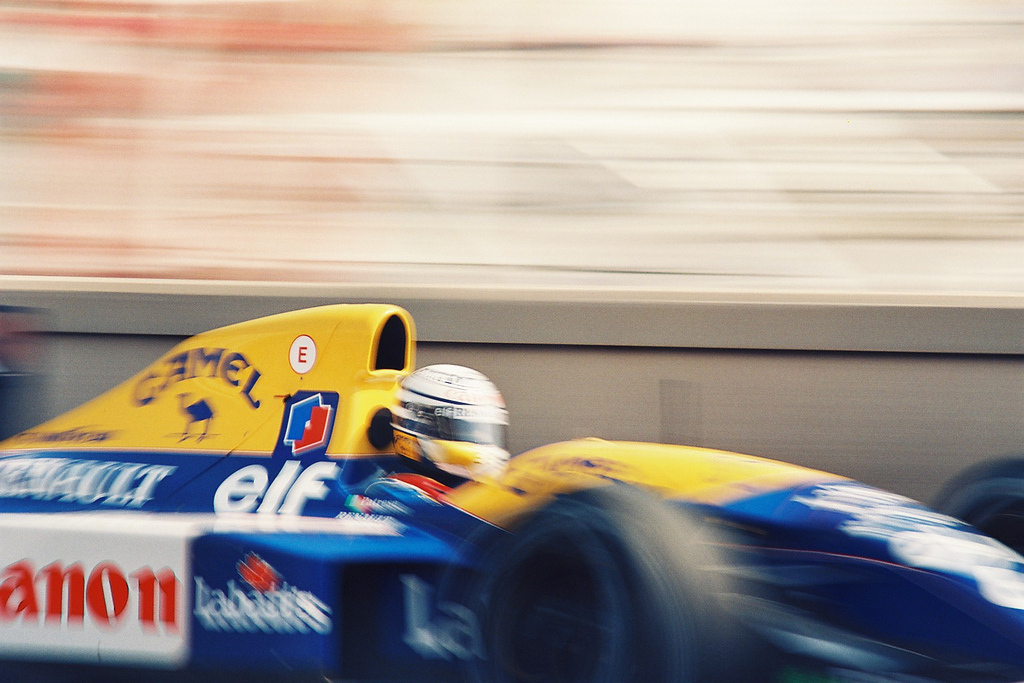
Riccardo Patrese finished Saturday qualifying second fastest despite being blocked by Bertrand Gachot in the final minutes of Saturday qualifying, resulting in a "paddock confrontation" between them.

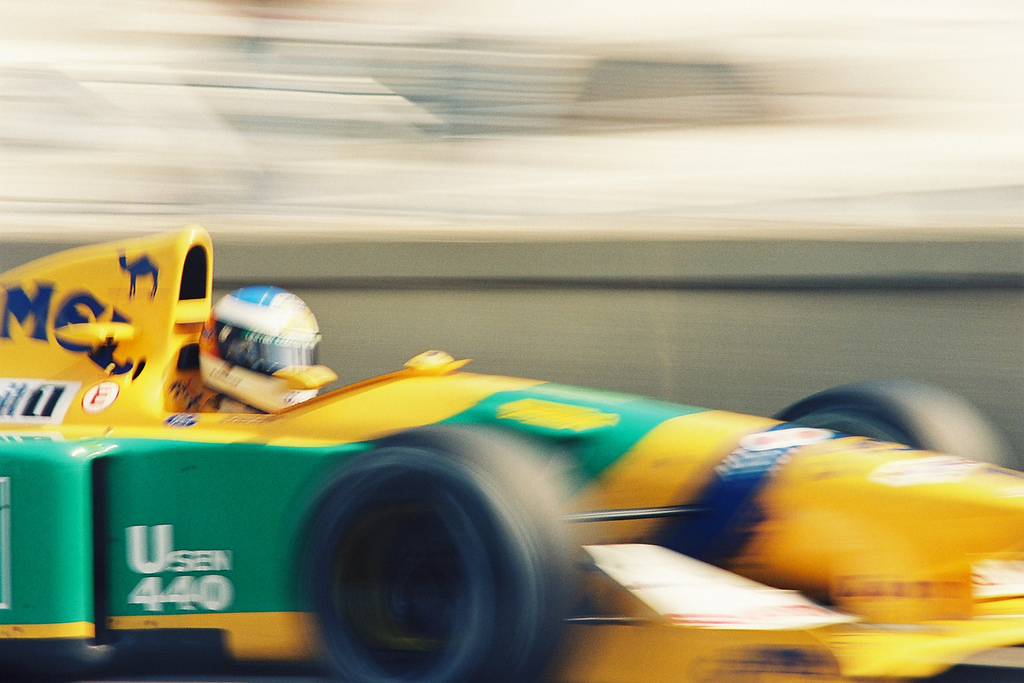
Michael Schumacher finished Saturday qualifying sixth fastest.

Nigel Mansell was fastest in the first practice session, 0.883 seconds ahead of Ayrton Senna in second, with Gerhard Berger in third and Michael Schumacher fourth. Michele Alboreto took advantage of his extra running in the earlier pre-qualifying session by finishing sixth fastest, with Andrea de Cesaris's Tyrrell in seventh and Karl Wendlinger's March eighth. Ferrari tried out a new traction control device and electronic differential on Jean Alesi's F92A car and he finished the session ninth fastest. Alesi still said the engine "needed more power and better response" though. Stefano Modena who qualified on the front row of the grid in the 1991 Monaco Grand Prix achieved the tenth fastest time and showed improvement with the Jordan 192 having previously failed to qualify for two races with Jordan in 1992. The qualifying session was split into two one-hour sessions; the first was held on Thursday afternoon with the second held on Saturday afternoon. The fastest time from either sessions counted towards their final grid position. The Thursday afternoon qualifying session was held under warm but overcast conditions. Mansell finished Thursday qualifying fastest with a 1:20.714. Senna was second fastest ahead of Riccardo Patrese in third. Berger was fourth fastest with a time of 1:22.359, but halfway through the session his McLaren's front suspension broke at Massenet causing him to crash heavily into the barriers. Berger commented:

I was really pushing hard and the car just didn't turn into the corner. I think something may have broken. It was a big shunt. I'm surprised I wasn't hurt.

Jean Alesi had a spin in the session and was forced to use the spare Ferrari F92A on used tyres, however he still finished with the fifth fastest time. Schumacher rounded out the top six with Andrea de Cesaris up in seventh place in the Tyrrell 020B. Having pre-qualified for the first time with Andrea Moda, Roberto Moreno continued to show improved speed by posting a 1:25.185 in the first twenty minutes, which put him 11th on the grid at the time despite Moreno's complaints of a "down-on-power engine". He managed no further laps in the session due to overheating problems and slipped to 20th fastest by the end of Thursday qualifying. Andrea Chiesa had an engine changed on his Fondmetal GR01 during the session and started late, finishing with a best lap time of 1:27.140, the slowest time of Thursday qualifying.

The weather conditions on Saturday were sunny and dry, but gradually became more overcast later into the afternoon. Within the first practice session on Saturday morning Pierluigi Martini crashed in the tunnel, causing damage to the barrier which took 40 minutes to repair and delayed the start of Saturday Qualifying by 30 minutes.

Mansell went even faster on Saturday with a 1:19.495 and took his sixth pole position of the season. He later described his time as a "totally clear lap". Patrese improved to qualify second fastest, however he was held up by Bertrand Gachot on one of his qualifying laps, and reacted by heading over to the Larrousse pit and trying to punch the Frenchman. Senna finished qualifying third on the grid despite spinning the rear of his car into the tyre barrier at the Mirabeau corner, damaging both his rear suspension and wing which eventually broke off in the tunnel as he returned his damaged car to the pits. Modena suffered a drive shaft failure early in the session and ran back to his pit to use the spare Jordan. In the spare car he failed to improve on his Friday time and dropped to 21st on the grid. He was the only driver who did not set a faster time in Saturday Qualifying. Following his crash in the morning Martini still took part in the afternoon session in the spare Dallara and qualified 18th fastest. Having finished 20th fastest on Thursday, Moreno only managed to improve slightly on his Thursday time with a 1:24.945 due to "a string of mechanical problems" with the S921 chassis. With the circuit proving faster on Saturday he fell to 26th place by the end of the session. Eric van de Poele set his fastest time in the final minutes of qualifying but just failed to make 26th place as he was +0.036 seconds slower than Moreno. Formula 1 journalist Joe Saward reported there was "rejoicing" in the Andrea Moda pit upon Moreno's qualification for the race.

=== Qualifying classification ===
| Pos | No | Driver | Constructor | Q1 Time | Q2 Time | Gap |
|---|---|---|---|---|---|---|
| 1 | 5 | (United Kingdom) Nigel Mansell | Williams-Renault | 1:20.714 | 1:19.495 | |
| 2 | 6 | (Italy) Riccardo Patrese | Williams-Renault | 1:22.309 | 1:20.368 | +0.873 |
| 3 | 1 | (Brazil) Ayrton Senna | McLaren-Honda | 1:21.467 | 1:20.608 | +1.113 |
| 4 | 27 | (France) Jean Alesi | Ferrari | 1:22.942 | 1:20.895 | +1.400 |
| 5 | 2 | (Austria) Gerhard Berger | McLaren-Honda | 1:22.359 | 1:21.224 | +1.729 |
| 6 | 19 | (Germany) Michael Schumacher | Benetton-Ford | 1:23.150 | 1:21.831 | +2.336 |
| 7 | 20 | (United Kingdom) Martin Brundle | Benetton-Ford | 1:23.872 | 1:22.068 | +2.573 |
| 8 | 28 | (Italy) Ivan Capelli | Ferrari | 1:23.813 | 1:22.119 | +2.624 |
| 9 | 12 | (United Kingdom) Johnny Herbert | Lotus-Ford | 1:25.979 | 1:22.579 | +3.084 |
| 10 | 4 | (Italy) Andrea de Cesaris | Tyrrell-Ilmor | 1:23.552 | 1:22.647 | +3.152 |
| 11 | 9 | (Italy) Michele Alboreto | Footwork-Mugen-Honda | 1:23.774 | 1:22.671 | +3.176 |
| 12 | 24 | (Italy) Gianni Morbidelli | Minardi-Lamborghini | 1:24.567 | 1:22.733 | +3.238 |
| 13 | 33 | (Brazil) Maurício Gugelmin | Jordan-Yamaha | 1:24.235 | 1:22.863 | +3.368 |
| 14 | 11 | (Finland) Mika Häkkinen | Lotus-Ford | 1:25.809 | 1:22.886 | +3.391 |
| 15 | 29 | (France) Bertrand Gachot | Venturi-Lamborghini | 1:23.606 | 1:23.122 | +3.627 |
| 16 | 16 | (Austria) Karl Wendlinger | March-Ilmor | 1:23.978 | 1:23.264 | +3.769 |
| 17 | 23 | (Brazil) Christian Fittipaldi | Minardi-Lamborghini | 1:25.561 | 1:23.487 | +3.992 |
| 18 | 22 | (Italy) Pierluigi Martini | Dallara-Ferrari | 1:25.665 | 1:23.508 | +4.013 |
| 19 | 10 | (Japan) Aguri Suzuki | Footwork-Mugen-Honda | 1:24.340 | 1:23.641 | +4.146 |
| 20 | 21 | (Finland) JJ Lehto | Dallara-Ferrari | 1:25.050 | 1:23.862 | +4.367 |
| 21 | 32 | (Italy) Stefano Modena | Jordan-Yamaha | 1:23.890 | 1:23.909 | +4.395 |
| 22 | 25 | (Belgium) Thierry Boutsen | Ligier-Renault | 1:25.222 | 1:23.909 | +4.414 |
| 23 | 26 | (France) Érik Comas | Ligier-Renault | 1:24.816 | 1:23.974 | +4.479 |
| 24 | 3 | (France) Olivier Grouillard | Tyrrell-Ilmor | 1:24.533 | 1:23.990 | +4.495 |
| 25 | 15 | (Italy) Gabriele Tarquini | Fondmetal-Ford | 1:25.614 | 1:24.479 | +4.984 |
| 26 | 34 | (Brazil) Roberto Moreno | Andrea Moda-Judd | 1:25.185 | 1:24.945 | +5.450 |
| 27 | 7 | (Belgium) Eric van de Poele | Brabham-Judd | 1:25.702 | 1:24.981 | +5.486 |
| 28 | 8 | (United Kingdom) Damon Hill | Brabham-Judd | 1:26.889 | 1:25.394 | +5.899 |
| 29 | 14 | (Switzerland) Andrea Chiesa | Fondmetal-Ford | 1:27.140 | 1:25.660 | +6.165 |
| 30 | 17 | (France) Paul Belmondo | March-Ilmor | 1:26.501 | 1:25.750 | +6.255 |

== Race ==
=== Race report ===
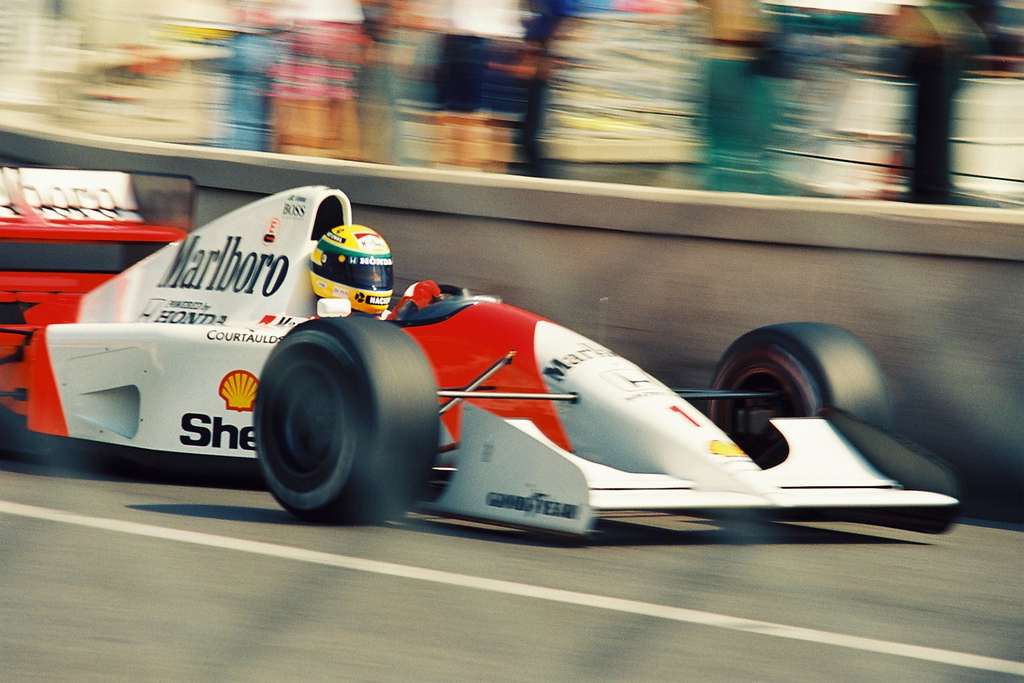
Ayrton Senna took the lead of the race on lap 70, but had to hold off a much faster Nigel Mansell after he caught up in the last three laps

The conditions for the race were overcast, but warm and dry. The drivers took to the track on Sunday morning for a 30-minute warm-up session and Williams driver Patrese finished fastest with Mansell down in fifth. Alboreto performed strongly in his Footwork to finish the session second, but his team-mate Aguri Suzuki was sent to hospital for checks after crashing his FA13 at Tabac. The Japanese driver was later pronounced fit to race.

The formation lap started at 15:30 local time. 26 cars qualified for the race, but only 25 took to the grid for the start as Gianni Morbidelli couldn't start his car during the warm-up lap and subsequently had to start from the pit lane.

At the start, Senna passed Patrese into the St. Devote corner. Schumacher also passed Berger into the first corner. Martini also experienced his second crash of the weekend within the opening lap by running into the barrier on the exit of Mirabeau. The order at the end of lap one was Mansell in first, followed by Senna, Patrese, Alesi, Schumacher and Berger. Morbidelli joined the race a couple of laps down but only managed one lap before the gearbox again caused problems and forced him to retire for good.

Moreno had moved up to nineteenth place thanks to the six earlier retirements but was forced to retire on lap 11 in the pits due to engine problems with the Judd GV V10. Patrese began to attack Senna but then began to drop back with gearbox troubles. On lap 12, Schumacher tried to pass Alesi in the Loews Hairpin and the two collided, and an electronic box was damaged in Alesi's car. Alesi continued to stay in fifth for another 16 laps with Schumacher getting ahead of him, before the damage forced him to retire on lap 28, this promoted Berger to fifth. Martin Brundle was chasing Berger, but he made an error in Nouvelle Chicane and not only suffered a puncture but also damaged the Benetton's front wing and had to pit for repairs, giving sixth place to Ivan Capelli. On lap 32 Berger had to retire when his gearbox failed.

On lap 60 Alboreto made a mistake and spun in front of Senna's McLaren-Honda, nearly causing a collision between them. In avoiding Alboreto's Footwork, Senna lost nearly 10 seconds.

Murray Walker: "Ivan Capelli. This won't of course have done his Ferrari position any good because although Luca Di Montezemolo, the Ferrari boss of both the passenger and the racing car divisions has said Capelli's position is safe; some of us doubted that statement and Capelli has gone off and out of the race, out of fifth position, out of a possible two points for the team"
James Hunt: "Some of us horrible cynics yes"

— BBC F1 Commentary

Ivan Capelli was running in fifth place despite having been lapped by Nigel Mansell, however on lap 61 he spun at Casino Square, damaging the steering arm. When he reached the swimming pool complex the damage caused him to spin and slide backwards wedging his Ferrari into barrier before Rascasse at a 45-degree angle. His retirement reminded the BBC F1 commentary team of the speculation regarding his future with Ferrari, which had been prominent before the race weekend.

Mansell led the race in his Williams FW14B-Renault up until lap 70, but then suffered a loose wheel nut and was forced into the pits, emerging behind Senna's McLaren. Mansell, on fresh tyres, set a lap record almost two seconds quicker than Senna's and closed from 5.2 to 1.9 seconds in only two laps. The pair duelled around the circuit for the final three laps but Mansell could find no way past, finishing just two-tenths of a second behind the Brazilian. It was Senna's fourth consecutive win at Monaco and fifth overall, equalling Graham Hill's record. Patrese took the final podium position after just holding off Schumacher's Benetton who finished fourth.

=== Post-race ===
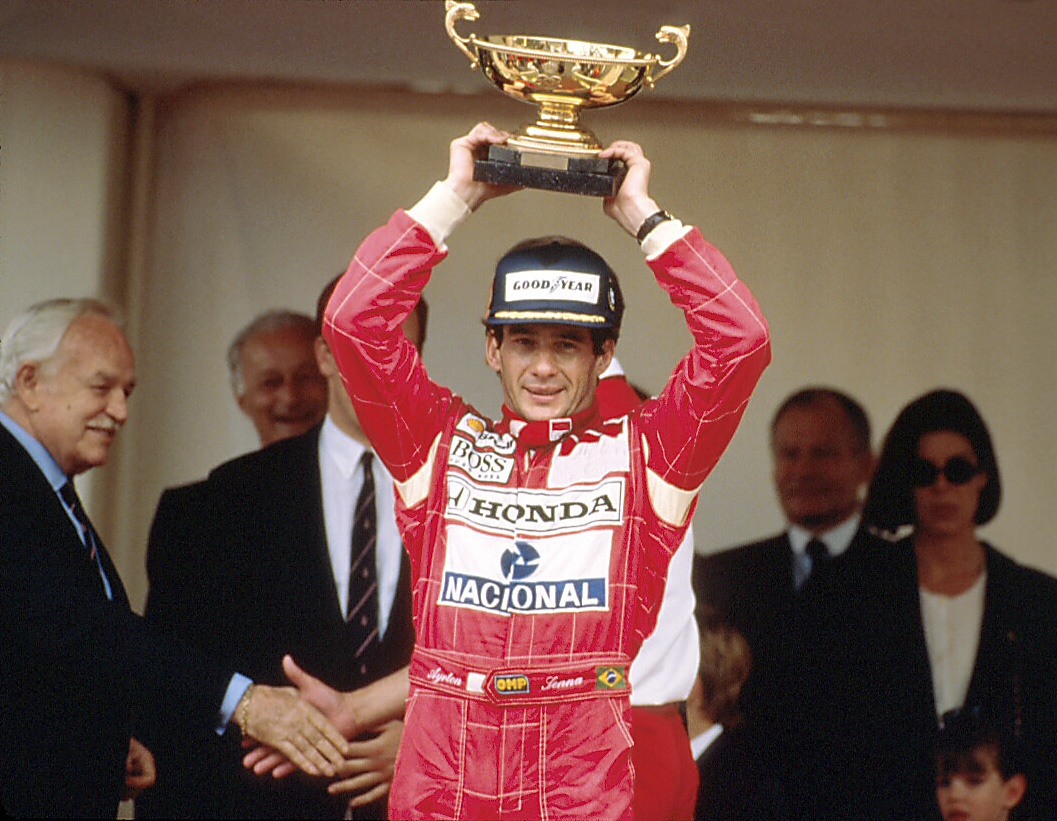
Race winner Ayrton Senna with Prince Rainier and Princess Stephanie, with Ron Dennis right behind

The top three finishers appeared in Prince Albert II of Monaco's Royal box to collect their trophies. An exhausted Mansell had to be helped up the stairs by marshals. In the subsequent press conference with Tony Jardine asking the questions, Senna admitted he knew the Williams car was "several seconds faster" than him in the last few laps and his tyres were like "driving on ice" due to having completed the whole race on the same set.

Mansell expressed his "disappointment" at not winning the race, but still described the result as the most important second place in his life and complimented Senna for his fair defensive driving:

I must compliment Ayrton because he pretty well second guessed every move I tried to do and he was very fair and he is entitled to do what he did and I think he drove fantastic and that's why he won the race I came a close second.

Mansell also described the sequence of events as a result of the suspected puncture on lap 71:

Coming into the tunnel I almost lost it, the back end just went down and I knew immediately I had picked up an instant puncture. The problem was I was halfway from the pits. So I had to drive so slowly to get to the pits. The car's brakes weren't working because I was only on three wheels. I think I lost 10–15 seconds just getting it back to the pits. We then had a longer pitstop than normal and as I came out of the pit I saw Ayrton go by, and I knew then that the race was probably lost, but as you can see from the last 10 laps we gave it everything we could and more and his car was just too wide to get past.

Despite initial reports that Mansell incurred a puncture in the tunnel on lap 71 Goodyear later denied this was the case. Williams engineer Adrian Newey later speculated the problem had "perhaps" been caused by a "loose wheel nut".

The 1992 Monaco Grand Prix turned out to be the only time the Andrea Moda team qualified for a Formula One race with Roberto Moreno retiring after 11 laps with engine problems. In an interview in 2011, Moreno declared qualifying the Andrea Moda S921 at Monaco was one of his greatest motor racing memories:

I will remember forever going out to pre-qualify the Andrea Moda in Monaco. The tyres in those days would do their best laps around the fifth or sixth laps. For us, after the fourth lap, the engine would overheat, because we didn't have cooling big enough! We could never run that long. The engine would overheat, and the oil would be too hot. I had to stop on lap 4, to not blow the engine up. So I had given it my max in pre-qualifying before I even got the best use of the tyres. It was enough to get through stage one, and the first hurdle was overcome. I got to qualifying, and I went out early in the session. In Monaco you always get the best times in the final laps, but I put the car 11th in the first twenty minutes, that was all the laps I could do. Coming into the pits, every team was out in the pits clapping at me, and that will stay in my memory forever. Suzuka 1990 was obviously a great memory, but in achievements? Qualifying an Andrea Moda is up there as well.

In a feature on the BBC's Formula 1 Website in 2009 former BBC Formula One commentator Murray Walker ranked the 1992 Monaco Grand Prix as one of the five "best ever" Formula 1 races due to what he described as the "absolute magic" battle for the lead in the last three laps between Senna and Mansell.

=== Race classification ===
| Pos | No | Driver | Constructor | Laps | Time/Retired | Grid | Points |
|---|---|---|---|---|---|---|---|
| 1 | 1 | (Brazil) Ayrton Senna | McLaren-Honda | 78 | 1:50:59.372 | 3 | 10 |
| 2 | 5 | (United Kingdom) Nigel Mansell | Williams-Renault | 78 | + 0.215 | 1 | 6 |
| 3 | 6 | (Italy) Riccardo Patrese | Williams-Renault | 78 | + 31.843 | 2 | 4 |
| 4 | 19 | (Germany) Michael Schumacher | Benetton-Ford | 78 | + 39.294 | 6 | 3 |
| 5 | 20 | (United Kingdom) Martin Brundle | Benetton-Ford | 78 | + 1:21.347 | 7 | 2 |
| 6 | 29 | (France) Bertrand Gachot | Venturi-Lamborghini | 77 | + 1 Lap | 15 | 1 |
| 7 | 9 | (Italy) Michele Alboreto | Footwork-Mugen-Honda | 77 | + 1 lap | 11 | |
| 8 | 23 | (Brazil) Christian Fittipaldi | Minardi-Lamborghini | 77 | + 1 lap | 17 | |
| 9 | 21 | (Finland) JJ Lehto | Dallara-Ferrari | 76 | + 2 laps | 20 | |
| 10 | 26 | (France) Érik Comas | Ligier-Renault | 76 | + 2 laps | 23 | |
| 11 | 10 | (Japan) Aguri Suzuki | Footwork-Mugen-Honda | 76 | + 2 laps | 19 | |
| 12 | 25 | (Belgium) Thierry Boutsen | Ligier-Renault | 75 | + 3 laps | 22 | |
| Ret | 28 | (Italy) Ivan Capelli | Ferrari | 60 | Spun off | 8 | |
| Ret | 2 | (Austria) Gerhard Berger | McLaren-Honda | 32 | Gearbox | 5 | |
| Ret | 11 | (Finland) Mika Häkkinen | Lotus-Ford | 30 | Gearbox | 14 | |
| Ret | 27 | (France) Jean Alesi | Ferrari | 28 | Gearbox | 4 | |
| Ret | 33 | (Brazil) Maurício Gugelmin | Jordan-Yamaha | 18 | Gearbox | 13 | |
| Ret | 12 | (United Kingdom) Johnny Herbert | Lotus-Ford | 17 | Spun off | 9 | |
| Ret | 34 | (Brazil) Roberto Moreno | Andrea Moda-Judd | 11 | Engine | 26 | |
| Ret | 4 | (Italy) Andrea de Cesaris | Tyrrell-Ilmor | 9 | Gearbox | 10 | |
| Ret | 15 | (Italy) Gabriele Tarquini | Fondmetal-Ford | 9 | Engine | 25 | |
| Ret | 32 | (Italy) Stefano Modena | Jordan-Yamaha | 6 | Spun off | 21 | |
| Ret | 3 | (France) Olivier Grouillard | Tyrrell-Ilmor | 4 | Transmission | 24 | |
| Ret | 16 | (Austria) Karl Wendlinger | March-Ilmor | 1 | Gearbox | 16 | |
| Ret | 24 | (Italy) Gianni Morbidelli | Minardi-Lamborghini | 1 | Gearbox | 12 | |
| Ret | 22 | (Italy) Pierluigi Martini | Dallara-Ferrari | 0 | Spun off | 18 | |
| DNQ | 7 | (Belgium) Eric van de Poele | Brabham-Judd | | | | |
| DNQ | 8 | (United Kingdom) Damon Hill | Brabham-Judd | | | | |
| DNQ | 14 | (Switzerland) Andrea Chiesa | Fondmetal-Ford | | | | |
| DNQ | 17 | (France) Paul Belmondo | March-Ilmor | | | | |
| DNPQ | 30 | (Japan) Ukyo Katayama | Venturi-Lamborghini | | | | |
| DNPQ | 35 | (United Kingdom) Perry McCarthy | Andrea Moda-Judd | | | | |

== Championship standings after the race ==
Drivers' Championship standings

| Pos | Driver | Points |
|---|---|---|
| 1 | (United Kingdom) Nigel Mansell | 56 |
| 2 | (Italy) Riccardo Patrese | 28 |
| 3 | (Germany) Michael Schumacher | 20 |
| 4 | (Brazil) Ayrton Senna | 18 |
| 5 | (Austria) Gerhard Berger | 8 |

Constructors' Championship standings

| | Pos | Constructor | Points |
|---|---|---|---|
| | 1 | (United Kingdom) Williams-Renault | 84 |
| 1 | 2 | (United Kingdom) McLaren-Honda | 26 |
| 1 | 3 | (United Kingdom) Benetton-Ford | 25 |
| | 4 | (Italy) Ferrari | 9 |
| | 5 | (United Kingdom) Footwork-Mugen-Honda | 5 |

- Note: Only the top five positions are included for both sets of standings.

| Previous race: 1992 San Marino Grand Prix | FIA Formula One World Championship; 1992 season | Next race: 1992 Canadian Grand Prix |
| Previous race: 1991 Monaco Grand Prix | Monaco Grand Prix | Next race: 1993 Monaco Grand Prix |
