= March 85B =

British open-wheel race car

March 85B March 86A
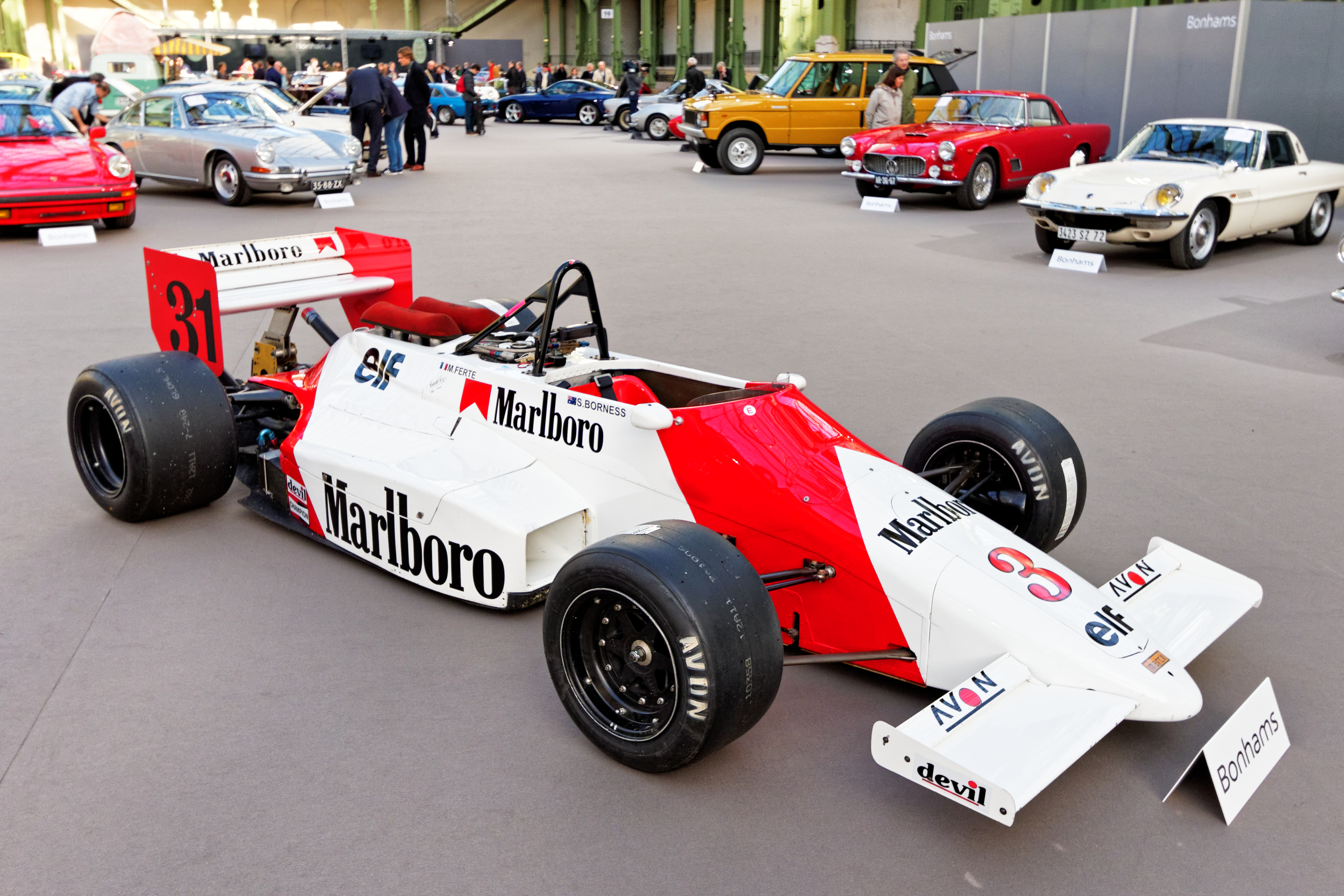
- Category: Formula 3000
- Constructor: March

Technical specifications
- Chassis: Aluminum monocoque with rear sub-frame covered in fiberglass body
- Suspension (front): Double wishbones, Coil springs over shock absorbers, Anti-roll bar
- Suspension (rear): Twin lower links, Single top links, twin trailing arms, Coil springs over shock absorbers, Anti-roll bar
- Wheelbase: 3,000 mm (118 in)
- Engine: Ford-Cosworth DFV, mid-engined, longitudinally mounted, 3.0 L (183.1 cu in), 90°, V8, DOHC, NA; Alfa Romeo, mid-engined, longitudinally mounted, 3.0 L (183.1 cu in), 60°, V6, SOHC, NA; Buick, mid-engined, longitudinally mounted, 3.5 L (213.6 cu in), 90°, V6, OHV, NA
- Transmission: Hewland 5-speed manual
- Power: 450 hp (340 kW)
- Weight: 540 kg (1,190 lb)

Competition history
- Debut: 1985

The March 85B was an open-wheel formula race car, designed, developed and built by British manufacturer March Engineering, for Formula 3000 racing categories, in 1985. A version of the car was adapted for the American Racing Series, later re-named Indy Lights. It was powered by a Buick V-6 pushrod engine.
