= Ivan Capelli =

Italian racing driver (born 1963)

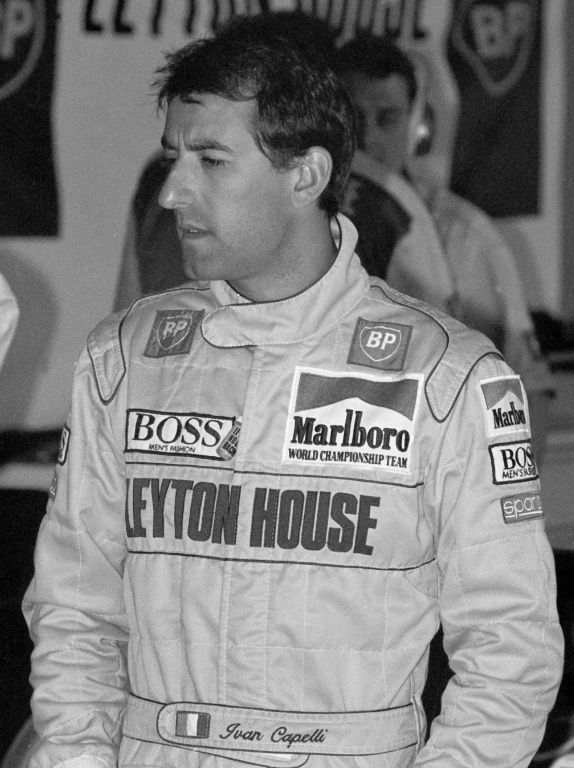
- Capelli at the 1991 United States Grand Prix
- Born: Ivan Franco Capelli; 24 May 1963 (age 63); Milan, Italy

Formula One World Championship career
- Nationality: (Italy) Italian
- Active years: 1985–1993
- Team(s): Tyrrell, AGS, March, Leyton House, Ferrari, Jordan
- Entries: 98 (93 starts)
- Championships: 0
- Wins: 0
- Podiums: 3
- Career points: 31
- Pole positions: 0
- Fastest laps: 0
- First entry: 1985 European Grand Prix
- Last entry: 1993 Brazilian Grand Prix

Awards
- 1992: Lorenzo Bandini Trophy

Ivan Franco Capelli (born 24 May 1963) is an Italian broadcaster and former racing driver, who competed in Formula One from 1985 to 1993.

Born and raised in Milan, Capelli began competitive kart racing aged 15. He was widely successful across lower formulae, winning titles in Italian Formula 3, FIA European Formula 3 and International Formula 3000. After making his Formula One debut with Tyrrell at the 1985 European Grand Prix, he made sporadic appearances for Tyrell and AGS before signing for March full-time in 1987. He participated in 98 Grands Prix, achieving three podiums.

After exiting Formula One, Capelli competed in touring car racing until 2017, becoming a race-winner in the Italian GT Championship and the Trofeo Maserati. From 1998 to 2017, he was a commentator and pundit for Rai 1.

== Early life and career ==
Ivan Franco Capelli was born on 24 May 1963 in Milan, Italy. Capelli began his career as a kart driver when he was 15 years old, and after four years he moved to the Italian Formula Three Championship.

In 1983, Capelli became Italian Formula Three champion, after dominating the series with nine victories. After that, he moved with the Coloni team to the European Formula Three Championship, and here he was the champion again in 1984.

In 1985, Capelli graduated to the European Formula 3000 Championship with a Genoa Racing March-Cosworth and won one race. After making his Formula One debut in 1985 and failing to sign a full-time contract, he contested the 1986 Formula 3000 Championship, still with Genoa Racing, and also raced a BMW in the European Touring Car Championship.

== Formula One career ==
=== Tyrrell and AGS (1985–1986) ===
In 1985, Capelli debuted in Formula One, driving a Tyrrell at the European Grand Prix, and finished fourth in Australia. Nevertheless, he was not picked up for a full-time Formula One drive in 1986.

Despite not landing a full-time contract for 1986, Capelli started several F1 races for the AGS team. Meanwhile, Cesare Gariboldi, boss of Genoa Racing, was working with Robin Herd of March to create a new Formula One outfit. Capelli was a core component in their plans. By now, Capelli and Gariboldi had an almost father-son relationship.

=== March / Leyton House (1987–1991) ===
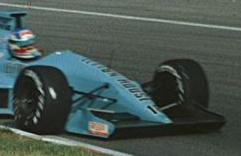
Capelli driving for March at the 1988 Canadian Grand Prix.

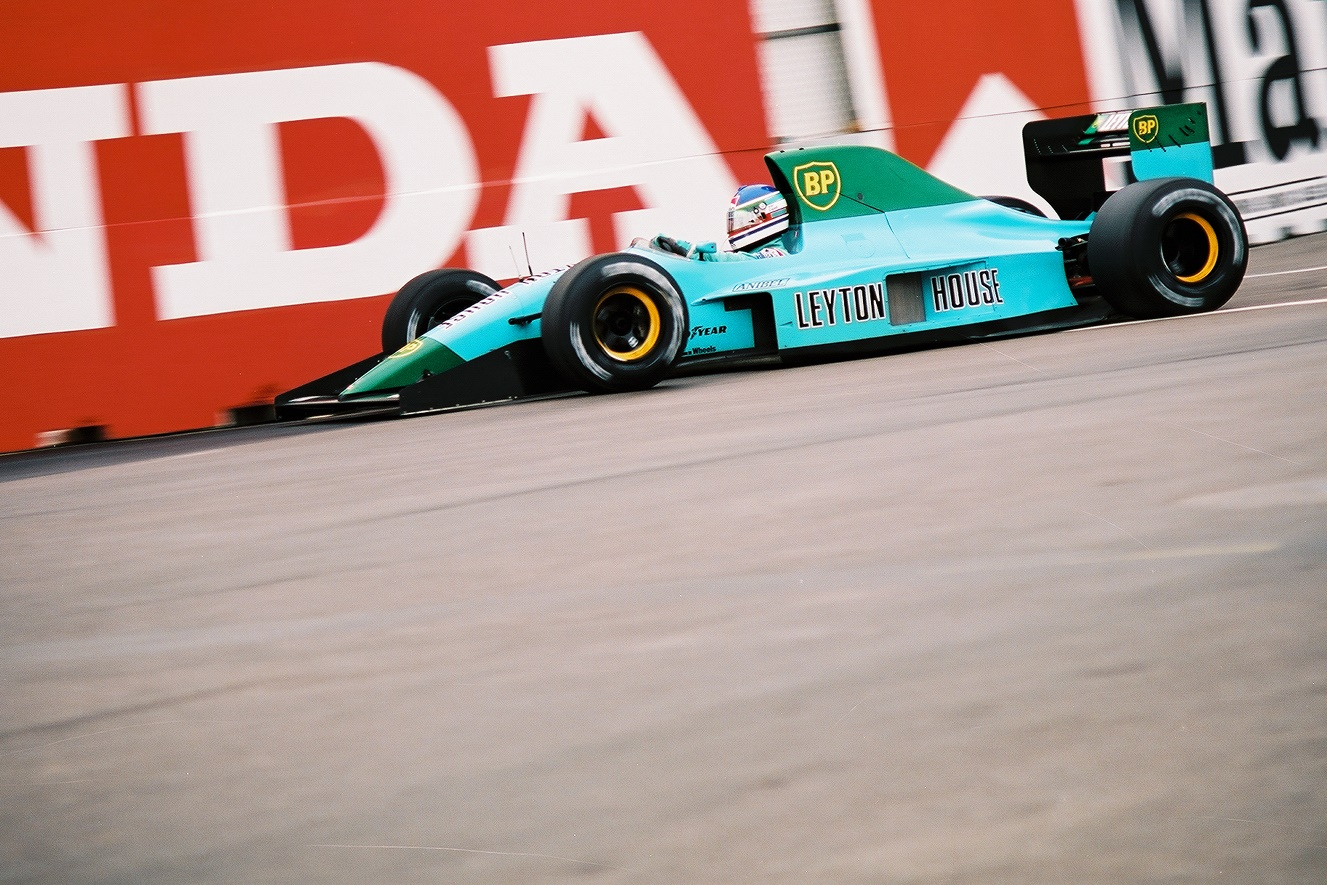
Capelli driving for Leyton House at the 1991 United States Grand Prix.

In 1987, Capelli was in Formula One full-time with the March team, led by Gariboldi and running Herd's new chassis with a Cosworth V8 normally aspirated engine. Capelli also continued with BMW touring cars for the Schnitzer team, as the March budget was tight (so much that they raced at the Belgian Grand Prix with a detuned 3.3-litre sports car engine rather than the full 3.5l Formula One unit), and the Schnitzer team had works status with BMW, allowing him to be on the German company's payroll. Capelli scored March's first point with sixth at the Monaco Grand Prix and March's return to Formula One was generally seen as competent, professional and promising for the future.

In 1988, Capelli had a March chassis designed by Adrian Newey (later a winner of multiple Constructors' Championships as a designer at Williams, McLaren and Red Bull) combined with a Judd V8 engine (derived from the Brabham-Honda CART engine and the Judd/Honda F3000 unit). March had hoped to be the favoured development partner for this engine, but they found themselves sharing it with the French Ligier team as well as the defending F1 Constructors' Champions Williams who had lost their supply of turbocharged Honda engines to McLaren. Capelli was joined in the team by the British Formula 3 Champion, Brazilian rookie Maurício Gugelmin. They made a strong team and the March 881 was the surprise of the year. At Spa-Francorchamps he scored his first podium with a third place behind Ayrton Senna's and Alain Prost's McLarens (though this was not known until after the season when the Benettons were disqualified for fuel irregularities). Capelli's best finish was second place at the Portuguese Grand Prix where he finished behind Prost. Even better was ahead for the Italian when he became the first non-turbo driver since 1983 to lead a World Championship Grand Prix. This happened on lap 16 of the Japanese Grand Prix at Suzuka when Prost missed a gear coming out of the final chicane and Capelli was able to get ahead before the start/finish line and officially lead the lap. However, Prost used Honda's superior power and was ahead before turn 1. His Judd V8 suffered an electrical failure just three laps later.

However, the momentum did not continue. March had financial problems and a sponsor, Leyton House, acquired a controlling interest. Gugelmin finished third in his home race at Jacarepaguá in 1989, but this was done in the 1988 car. The definitive 1989 Leyton House March was a disappointment, and neither driver challenged for the top in the rest of the year. Capelli in particular only finished once throughout the season (12th in Belgium) and went far enough to be classified on one further occasion (Monaco where he dropped out from 6th place near the end and was classified 11th). Despite this, he was one of only six drivers to start in all of the 16 races of the 1989 season (the others were the McLaren drivers Ayrton Senna and Alain Prost, the Williams duo Riccardo Patrese and Thierry Boutsen, and Benetton's Alessandro Nannini). Team spirit remained intact despite the death of Gariboldi in a car crash and midway through the season Capelli felt happy enough in the team to take up his option for 1990. The new decade started poorly, though. Newey's car (given the prefix CG in honour of Gariboldi) had excellent aerodynamics and exclusive use of Judd's updated V8 engine, but it was intolerant of bumps. It was so bad on the notoriously bumpy Mexico City track that neither driver could control the car and both failed to qualify. Nevertheless, in the next at Paul Ricard in France came a complete turnaround in form. Capelli led Gugelmin in a Leyton House 1–2 throughout much of the race. Gugelmin finally retired, and Capelli was overtaken near the end by the Ferrari of Prost with only three laps remaining and went on to finish second. Revisions to the car had made it more competitive (ironically Newey left the team shortly before the race to join Williams), but it was the billiard table-smooth track which allowed the result. Despite some promising showings at Silverstone and Hockenheim, it remained their best race of the season.

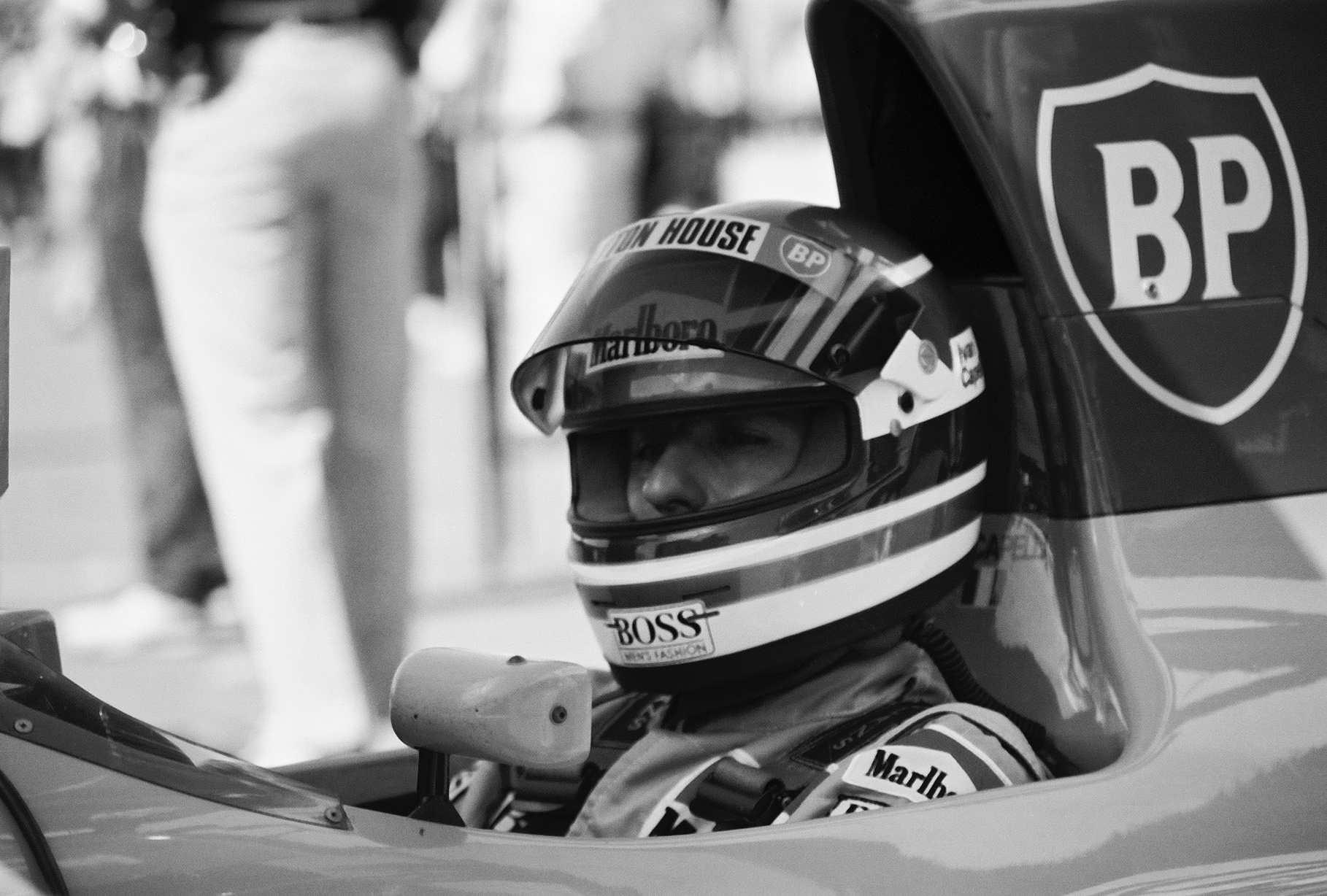
Capelli in the cockpit of his Leyton House for the 1991 United States Grand Prix.

In 1991, Leyton House was responsible not only for chassis development but also bankrolled the ambitious Ilmor V10 engine programme. With so many new ingredients, results were again sparse, although Capelli often qualified and raced well. When Leyton House's owner Akira Akagi was arrested in connection with the Fuji Bank fraud, the team was in a precarious state. Capelli had signed for Scuderia Ferrari for the '92 season, so he voluntarily stepped down, allowing pay driver Karl Wendlinger to finish the season and personally paid to attend the races he missed to offer support to the team and advice to his rookie substitute.

=== Ferrari and Jordan (1992–1993) ===
In 1992, Capelli became the first Italian with a regular drive with Ferrari since Michele Alboreto in 1988, after Gianni Morbidelli's one-off race for the team the season before. As of 2025, Capelli is still the last Italian to have a regular drive for Ferrari, with substitute appearances for Nicola Larini (1994), Luca Badoer and Giancarlo Fisichella (both 2009). The Scuderia had gone through a tough time in 1991, but with a new car, the F92A, expectations were high. The new car was not competitive and before the season began Capelli was showing his disappointment. A driver who enjoyed the convivial atmosphere of a family-type team, he struggled to integrate with the bureaucratic structure of the early 1990s Ferrari. Losing motivation, the team in turn lost confidence in him and his teammate Jean Alesi gained the upper hand. Capelli was sacked before the season's end. It was the last time until Felipe Massa in 2011 that a Ferrari driver failed to finish on the podium during a season.

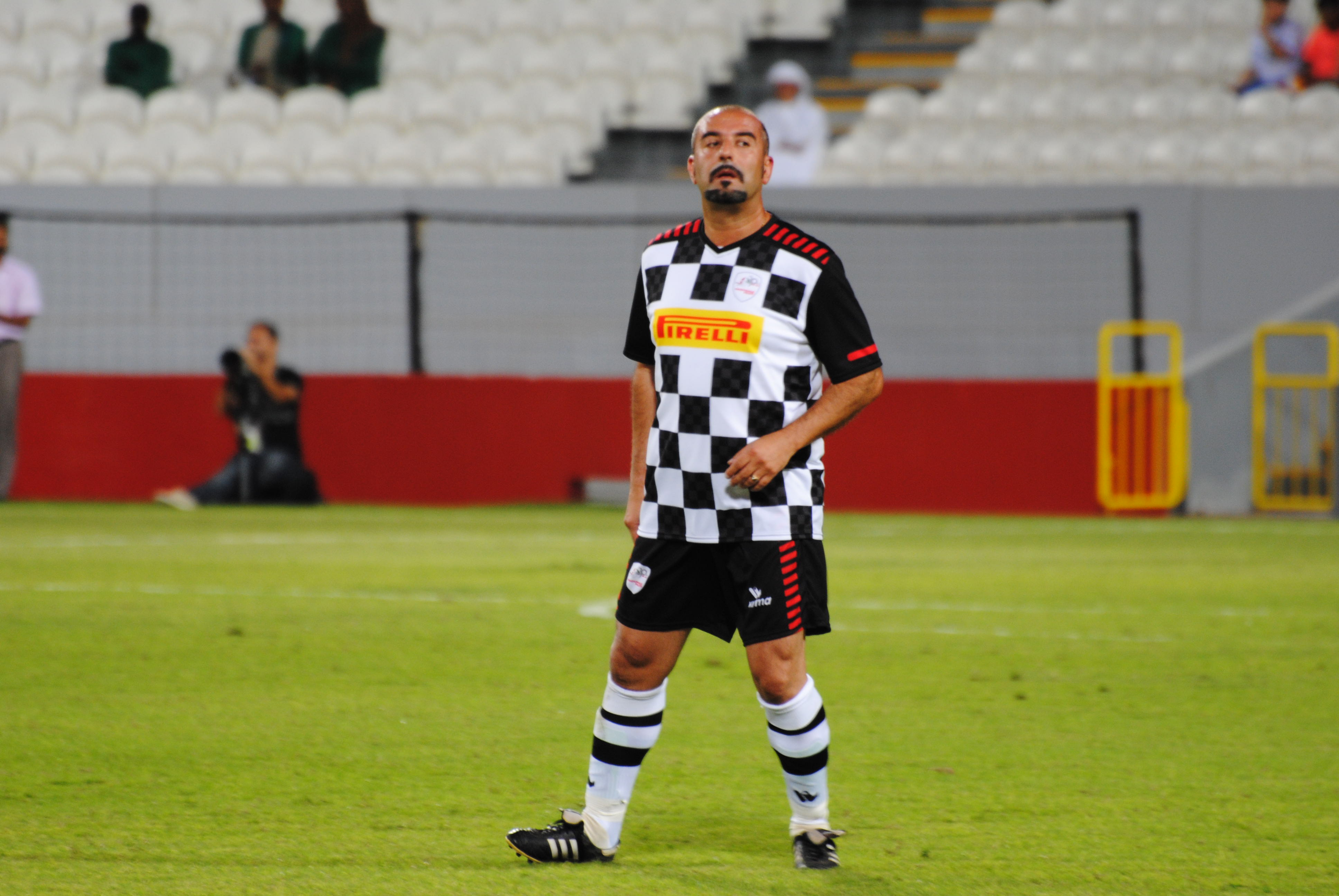
Capelli playing for Nazionale Piloti during a charity football match In Abu Dhabi

This experience seemingly broke his spirit, but those who had worked with him in March still had faith, notably Ian Phillips, then Jordan's team manager. Taking a Jordan seat for 1993 alongside young rookie Rubens Barrichello, whom the team hoped would prosper under the more experienced driver, Capelli failed to rediscover the spark that not long ago had marked him as a champion of the future. After failing to qualify for the second race in Brazil, he left the team by mutual consent, being replaced by Thierry Boutsen. He did not race in Formula One again.

== Other ventures ==
=== Touring car racing ===
Following his exit from Formula One, Capelli raced from 1994 to 1996 with a Nissan Primera with mixed results in the German Super Tourenwagen Cup for BMS Scuderia Italia and in some rounds of the Spanish Touring Car Championship in 1995 and 1996.

=== Broadcasting ===
Capelli became a Formula One commentator from 1998 until 2017 on the Italian TV station Rai 1.

== Racing record ==
=== Career summary ===
Season	Series	Team	Races	Wins	Poles	F/Laps	Podiums	Points	Position
1982	Italian Formula Three	Cesare Gariboldi	11	0	0	1	1	25.5	6th
1982	European Formula Three	Torino Corse	3	0	0	0	0	0	NC
1983	Italian Formula Three	Coloni Motorsport	12	9	10	8	10	91	**1st**
1983	European Formula Three	Coloni Motorsport	3	0	0	0	1	5	15th
1984	European Formula Three	Coloni Motorsport	12	4	2	4	9	60	**1st**
1984	Italian Formula Three	Coloni Motorsport	1	0	0	1	1	6	12th
1984	Macau Grand Prix	Marlboro Theodore Racing Team	1	0	0	0	0	N/A	5th
1985	European Formula 3000 Championship	Genoa Racing	6	1	0	1	2	13	7th
1985	Formula One	Tyrrell Racing Organisation	2	0	0	0	0	3	19th
1986	International Formula 3000 Championship	Genoa Racing	11	2	3	1	6	39	**1st**
1986	Japanese Formula Two	Leyton House Racing	3	0	0	?	2	33	7th
1986	Formula One	Jolly Club SpA	2	0	0	0	0	0	NC
1986	Macau Grand Prix	David Price Racing w/ Marlboro Theodore Racing	1	0	0	0	0	N/A	11th
1986	IMSA GT Championship	Conte Racing	1	0	0	0	0	0	NC
1987	Formula One	Leyton House March Racing Team	15	0	0	0	0	1	19th
1987	World Touring Car Championship	Schnitzer Motorsport	5	0	0	0	3	60	23rd
1987	European Touring Car Championship	Schnitzer Motorsport	1	0	0	0	0	0	NC
1988	Formula One	Leyton House March Racing Team	15	0	0	0	2	17	7th
1989	Formula One	Leyton House Racing	16	0	0	0	0	0	NC
1990	Formula One	Leyton House	14	0	0	0	1	6	10th
1991	Formula One	Leyton House	14	0	0	0	0	1	18th
1992	Formula One	Scuderia Ferrari SpA	14	0	0	0	0	3	13th
1993	Italian Superturismo Championship	Nissan Castrol Racing	6	0	0	0	0	8	20th
1993	FIA Touring Car World Cup	Nissan Castrol Racing	2	0	0	0	0	8	20th
1993	Formula One	Sasol Jordan	1	0	0	0	0	0	NC
1994	Super Tourenwagen Cup	Nissan Primera Racing	8	0	0	1	0	21	11th
1995	Super Tourenwagen Cup	Nissan Primera Racing	11	0	0	0	0	26	29th
1995	Campeonato de España de Turismos	Team Repsol Nissan	4	0	0	0	2	0	NC†
1995	24 Hours of Le Mans	Honda Motor Co. Ltd.	1	0	0	0	0	N/A	DNF
1996	Super Tourenwagen Cup	Nissan Primera Racing	8	0	0	0	0	49	25th
1996	Campeonato de España de Turismos	Team Repsol Nissan	4	0	0	0	2	0	NC†
1997	IMSA GT Championship	Target 24	1	0	0	0	0	0	NC
1997	FIA GT Championship	Konrad Motorsport	1	0	0	0	0	0	NC
2000	Grand American Road Racing Championship	Franco Scapini Motorsport	1	0	0	0	0	0	NC
2000	FIA GT Championship	Supertech erg	1	0	0	0	0	0	NC
2001	FIA Sportscar Championship	R&M	1	0	0	0	0	0	NC
2002	FIA GT Championship	Team Veloqx	1	0	0	0	0	0	NC
2003	Porsche Supercup	Porsche AG	1	0	0	0	0	0	NC†
2006	Italian GT Championship	Racing Box, Loris Kessel Racing	6	3	2	2	5	84	7th
2008	Australian GT Championship	Rod Wilson	2	0	0	0	0	0	NC
2008	Australian Tourist Trophy	Trofeo Motorsport	2	0	0	0	0	66	5th
2009	Lamborghini Super Trofeo	Automobili Lamborghini	3	0	0	0	0	6	11th
2010	Trofeo Maserati	?	2	1	2	?	1	0	NC
2012	International GTSprint Series	Kessel Racing	2	0	0	0	2	32	9th
2013	Italian Touring Car Championship	?	?	?	?	?	?	43	15th
2013	Australian GT Championship	Trofeo Motorsport	4	0	0	0	1	73	14th
2015	Italian GT Championship	Team Pellin	2	0	0	0	0	2	42nd
2017	Australian GT Championship	Trofeo Motorsport	2	0	0	0	0	0	NC†
2017	Intercontinental GT Challenge	Trofeo Motorsport	1	0	0	0	0	4	14th

^{†} As Capelli was a guest driver, he was ineligible for championship points.

=== Complete International Formula 3000 results ===
(key) (Races in bold indicate pole position; races in italics indicate fastest lap.)

Year	Entrant	Chassis	Engine	1	2	3	4	5	6	7	8	9	10	11	12	Pos.	Pts
1985	Genoa Racing	March 85B	Cosworth	SIL	THR	EST	NÜR	VAL; Ret		SPA; Ret	DIJ; Ret	PER; Ret	ÖST; 1	ZAN; DNS	DON; 3	7th	13
1985	Sanremo Racing	March 85B	Cosworth						PAU; DNS							7th	13
1986	Genoa Racing	March 86B	Cosworth	SIL; Ret	**VAL**; 1	PAU; Ret	SPA; 3	**IMO**; 2	MUG; 3	**PER**; Ret	ÖST; 1	BIR; Ret	BUG; 4	JAR; 4		**1st**	**38**

=== Complete Macau Grand Prix results ===
Year	Team	Chassis/Engine	Qualifying	Race1	Race2	Overall ranking
1984	(Hong Kong) Marlboro Theodore Racing Team	Ralt・Toyota	10th	7	5	5th
1986	(United Kingdom) David Price Racing w/ Marlboro Theodore Racing	Reynard・Alfa Romeo	16th	14	12	11th

=== Complete Formula One results ===
(key) (Races in bold indicate pole position, races in italics indicate fastest lap)

Year	Entrant	Chassis	Engine	1	2	3	4	5	6	7	8	9	10	11	12	13	14	15	16	WDC	Points
1985	Tyrrell Racing Organisation	Tyrrell 014	Renault EF4B 1.5 V6 t	BRA	POR	SMR	MON	CAN	DET	FRA	GBR	GER	AUT	NED	ITA	BEL	EUR; Ret	RSA	AUS; 4	19th	3
1986	Jolly Club SpA	AGS JH21C	Motori Moderni Tipo 615-90 1.5 V6 t	BRA	ESP	SMR	MON	BEL	CAN	DET	FRA	GBR	GER	HUN	AUT	ITA; Ret	POR; Ret	MEX	AUS	NC	0
1987	Leyton House March Racing Team	March 87P	Ford Cosworth DFZ 3.5 V8	BRA; DNS																19th	1
1987	Leyton House March Racing Team	March 871	Ford Cosworth DFZ 3.5 V8		SMR; Ret	BEL; Ret	MON; 6	DET; Ret	FRA; Ret	GBR; Ret	GER; Ret	HUN; 10	AUT; 11	ITA; 13	POR; 9	ESP; 12	MEX; Ret	JPN; Ret	AUS; Ret	19th	1
1988	Leyton House March Racing Team	March 881	Judd CV 3.5 V8	BRA; Ret	SMR; Ret	MON; 10	MEX; 16	CAN; 5	DET; DNS	FRA; 9	GBR; Ret	GER; 5	HUN; Ret	BEL; 3	ITA; 5	POR; 2	ESP; Ret	JPN; Ret	AUS; 6	7th	17
1989	Leyton House Racing	March 881	Judd CV 3.5 V8	BRA; Ret	SMR; Ret															NC	0
1989	Leyton House Racing	March CG891	Judd EV 3.5 V8			MON; 11†	MEX; Ret	USA; Ret	CAN; Ret	FRA; Ret	GBR; Ret	GER; Ret	HUN; Ret	BEL; 12	ITA; Ret	POR; Ret	ESP; Ret	JPN; Ret	AUS; Ret	NC	0
1990	Leyton House	Leyton House CG901	Judd EV 3.5 V8	USA; Ret	BRA; DNQ	SMR; Ret	MON; Ret	CAN; 10	MEX; DNQ	FRA; 2	GBR; Ret	GER; 7	HUN; Ret	BEL; 7	ITA; Ret	POR; Ret	ESP; Ret	JPN; Ret	AUS; Ret	10th	6
1991	Leyton House	Leyton House CG911	Ilmor 2175A 3.5 V10	USA; Ret	BRA; Ret	SMR; Ret	MON; Ret	CAN; Ret	MEX; Ret	FRA; Ret	GBR; Ret	GER; Ret	HUN; 6	BEL; Ret	ITA; 8	POR; 17^{†}	ESP; Ret	JPN	AUS	18th	1
1992	Scuderia Ferrari SpA	Ferrari F92A	Ferrari 038 3.5 V12	RSA; Ret	MEX; Ret	BRA; 5	ESP; 10^{†}	SMR; Ret	MON; Ret	CAN; Ret	FRA; Ret	GBR; 9	GER; Ret	HUN; 6	BEL; Ret					13th	3
1992	Scuderia Ferrari SpA	Ferrari F92AT	Ferrari 038 3.5 V12													ITA; Ret	POR; Ret	JPN	AUS	13th	3
1993	Sasol Jordan	Jordan 193	Hart 1035 3.5 V10	RSA; Ret	BRA; DNQ	EUR	SMR	ESP	MON	CAN	FRA	GBR	GER	HUN	BEL	ITA	POR	JPN	AUS	NC	0

^{†} Driver did not finish the Grand Prix but was classified as he completed over 90% of the race distance.

=== Complete Super Tourenwagen Cup results ===
(key) (Races in bold indicate pole position) (Races in italics indicate fastest lap)

Year	Team	Car	1	2	3	4	5	6	7	8	9	10	11	12	13	14	15	16	17	18	Pos.	Pts
1994	Nissan Primera Racing	Nissan Primera	AVU; Ret	WUN; 6	ZOL; Ret	ZAN; Ret	ÖST; 8	SAL; 9	SPA; 9	NÜR; 5											11th	21
1995	Nissan Primera Racing	Nissan Primera	ZOL; 1; 11	ZOL; 2 Ret	SPA; 1 Ret	SPA; 2 DNS	ÖST; 1 Ret	ÖST; 2 DNS	HOC; 1 Ret	HOC; 2 DNS	NÜR; 1 Ret	NÜR; 2; 14	SAL; 1; 22	SAL; 2; 20	AVU; 1 Ret	AVU; 2 Ret	NÜR; 1	NÜR; 2			29th	26
1996	Nissan Primera Racing	Nissan Primera	ZOL; 1; 21	ZOL; 2 DNS	ASS; 1; 14	ASS; 2; 20	HOC; 1	HOC; 2	SAC; 1	SAC; 2	WUN; 1	WUN; 2	ZWE; 1; 10	ZWE; 2 Ret	SAL; 1 Ret	SAL; 2 DNS	AVU; 1	AVU; 2	NÜR; 1; 8	NÜR; 2; 13	25th	49

=== Complete 24 Hours of Le Mans results ===
Year	Team	Co-Drivers	Car	Class	Laps	Pos.	Class Pos.
1995	(Japan) Honda Motor Co. Ltd.	(Germany) Armin Hahne (Belgium) Bertrand Gachot	Honda NSX GT1	GT1	7	DNF	DNF

=== Complete FIA GT Championship results ===
(key)

Year	Team	Class	Car	Engine	1	2	3	4	5	6	7	8	9	10	11	Pos.	Points
1997	Konrad Motorsport	GT1	Porsche 911 GT1	Porsche 3.2 L Turbo Flat-6	HOC	SIL	HEL	NÜR; Ret	SPA	A1R	SUZ	DON	MUG	SEB	LAG	NC	0
2000	Supertech erg	N-GT	Ferrari 360 Modena	Ferrari 3.6 L V8	VAL	EST	MNZ; 10	SIL	HUN	ZOL	A1R	LAU	BRN	MAG		NC	0
2002	Team Veloqx	N-GT	Ferrari 360 Modena N-GT	Ferrari 3.6 L V8	MAG	SIL	BRN	JAR	AND	OSC	SPA	PER	DON; 12	EST; Ret		NC	0

=== Complete Porsche Supercup results ===
(key) (Races in bold indicate pole position) (Races in italics indicate fastest lap)

Year	Team	Car	1	2	3	4	5	6	7	8	9	10	11	12	DC	Points	Ref
2003	Porsche AG	Porsche 996 GT3	ITA; 7	ESP	AUT	MON	GER1	FRA	GBR	GER2	HUN	ITA	USA	USA	NC‡	0‡	

‡ – Guest driver – Not eligible for points.

Sporting positions
Preceded by Enzo Coloni	Italian Formula Three Championship; Champion; 1983	Succeeded by Alessandro Santin
Preceded by Michel Ferté	Monaco Formula Three; Winner; 1984	Succeeded by Pierre-Henri Raphanel
Preceded by Pierluigi Martini	European Formula Three Championship; Champion; 1984	Succeeded by Daniel Juncadella (2012)
Preceded by Christian Danner	International Formula 3000; Champion; 1986	Succeeded by Stefano Modena
Awards
Preceded by Inaugural	Lorenzo Bandini Trophy; 1992	Succeeded by David Coulthard (1995)
